= List of military alliances =

A military alliance is a legally binding treaty between two or more parties in which the contracting parties agree to mutually protect one another militarily in case of an armed conflict. Military alliances differ from coalitions, which are formed in response to a specific crisis and last until the crisis is resolved. Military alliances can be bilateral or multilateral. Numerous forms of military and defensive alliances have existed between states since early human history. This is a comprehensive list of former and present military alliances.

== Bilateral military alliances ==
Legend
Active military alliances

Years	Name	Members
493 BC	Foedus Cassianum	Roman Republic; Latin League
215 BC	Macedonian–Carthaginian Treaty	Macedonia; Carthage
433–554	Silla–Baekje Alliance	Silla; Baekje
1123	Pactum Warmundi	Kingdom of Jerusalem; Republic of Venice
1266–1320	Byzantine–Mongol Alliance	Byzantine Empire; Golden Horde
1295–1560	Auld Alliance	Kingdom of France; Kingdom of Scotland
1373	Anglo-Portuguese Treaty of 1373 (Note: See also Anglo-Portuguese Alliance)	Kingdom of England; Kingdom of Portugal
1386	Treaty of Windsor	Kingdom of England; Kingdom of Portugal
1499	Treaty of Blois	Kingdom of France; Republic of Venice
1524–1525	Franco-Polish alliance	Crown of Poland; Kingdom of France
1528	Franco-Hungarian alliance	Kingdom of France; Kingdom of Hungary
1536–1798	Franco-Ottoman alliance	Kingdom of France; Ottoman Empire
1631–1639	Treaty of Fontainebleau	Electorate of Bavaria; Kingdom of France
1635	Treaty of Compiègne (1635)	Kingdom of France; Sweden
1654	Anglo-Swedish Alliance	England; Sweden
1654–1764	Pereiaslav Agreement	Tsardom of Russia; Cossack Hetmanate
1656	Treaty of Marienburg	Brandenburg-Prussia; Sweden
1672	Treaty of Stockholm	Kingdom of France; Sweden
1716–1731	Anglo-French Alliance	Kingdom of France; Kingdom of Great Britain
1731–1756	Anglo-Austrian Alliance	Kingdom of Great Britain; Habsburg Monarchy
1742	Convention of Turin	Archduchy of Austria; Duchy of Savoy
1756–1762	Anglo-Prussian Alliance (1756)	Kingdom of Great Britain; Kingdom of Prussia
1756–1792	Franco-Austrian Alliance	Kingdom of France; Habsburg Monarchy
1764–1788	Russo-Prussian alliance	Russian Empire; Kingdom of Prussia
1773–1810	Treaty of Tsarskoye Selo	Denmark–Norway; Russian Empire
1778–1800	Treaty of Alliance	United States; Kingdom of France
1779–1783	Treaty of Aranjuez	Kingdom of France; Kingdom of Spain
1781–1790	Austro-Russian Alliance	Russian Empire; Habsburg Monarchy
1788–1791	Anglo-Prussian Alliance (1788)	Kingdom of Great Britain; Kingdom of Prussia
1790–1792	Polish–Prussian alliance	Kingdom of Prussia; Polish–Lithuanian Commonwealth
1807	Russo-Serbian Alliance	Russian Empire; Revolutionary Serbia
1807–1812	Treaties of Tilsit	Napoleonic France; Russian Empire
1867–1868	Greek–Serbian Alliance of 1867	Kingdom of Greece; Principality of Serbia
1873	Treaty of Defensive Alliance (Bolivia–Peru)	Bolivia; Peru
1879–1918	Dual Alliance	Austria–Hungary; German Empire
1881–1908	Austro-Serbian Alliance	Austria–Hungary; Principality of Serbia
1892–1917	Franco-Russian Alliance	French Third Republic; Russian Empire
1902–1923	Anglo-Japanese Alliance	Japan; United Kingdom
1904	Entente Cordiale (Note: See also Lancaster House Treaties)	France; United Kingdom
1904	Treaty of Sofia	Principality of Bulgaria; Kingdom of Serbia
1913–1914	Greek–Serbian Alliance of 1913	Greece; Serbia
1914–1918	German–Ottoman alliance	German Empire; Ottoman Empire
1914–1918	Ottoman–Bulgarian alliance	Kingdom of Bulgaria; Ottoman Empire
1915–1918	Bulgaria–Germany treaty (1915)	Kingdom of Bulgaria; German Empire
1920–1921	Polish–Ukrainian Agreement	Poland; Ukraine
1920–1940	Franco-Polish Alliance (1921)	France; Poland
1920–1921	Georgian–Polish alliance	Georgia; Poland
1921–1939	Polish–Romanian alliance	Poland; Romania
1922–1958	Anglo-Iraqi treaties of 1922, 1930 and 1948	Iraq; United Kingdom
1930–1939/40	Finnish–Estonian defence cooperation	Estonia; Finland
1935–1939	Franco-Soviet Treaty of Mutual Assistance	France; Soviet Union
1936–1956	Anglo-Egyptian treaty of 1936	Egypt; United Kingdom
1939–1944	Anglo-Polish alliance	Poland; United Kingdom
1939–1940	Soviet–Estonian Mutual Assistance Treaty	Estonia; Soviet Union
1939–1940	Soviet–Latvian Mutual Assistance Treaty	Latvia; Soviet Union
1939–1940	Soviet–Lithuanian Mutual Assistance Treaty	Lithuania; Soviet Union
1939–1949 (Note: Effectively ended in 1943)	Pact of Friendship and Alliance between Germany and Italy or Pact of Steel	Germany; Italy
1940	Ogdensburg Agreement	Canada; United States
1941–1945	Anglo-Soviet Agreement	Soviet Union; United Kingdom
1942–1945	Twenty-Year Mutual Assistance Agreement Between the United Kingdom and the Union of Soviet Socialist Republics or Anglo-Soviet Treaty of 1942	Soviet Union; United Kingdom
1946–1948	Treaty of Alliance Between His Majesty in Respect of the United Kingdom and His Highness the Amir of Transjordan or Treaty of London (1946)	Jordan; United Kingdom
1947–1997	Treaty of Dunkirk	France; United Kingdom
1950–1979	Sino-Soviet Treaty of Friendship, Alliance and Mutual Assistance	China; Soviet Union
1951	Mutual Defense Treaty between the Republic of the Philippines and the United States of America (MDT)	Philippines; United States
1951	U.S.–Japan Alliance	Japan; United States
1952–1977	Brazil–United States Treaty	Brazil; United States
1953	Mutual Defense Treaty between the United States and the Republic of Korea	South Korea; United States
1955–1975	Simonstown Agreement	South Africa; United Kingdom
1955–1980	Mutual Defense Treaty between the United States and the Republic of China	China (Republic of China); United States
1957	North American Aerospace Defense Command (NORAD)	Canada; United States
1957–1967	Anglo-Malayan Defence Agreement (AMDA)	Malaya; United Kingdom
1958	Agreement between the Government of the United States of America and the Government of the United Kingdom of Great Britain and Northern Ireland for Cooperation on the uses of Atomic Energy for Mutual Defense Purposes or 1958 UK–US Mutual Defence Agreement	United Kingdom; United States
1961	Mutual Aid and Cooperation Friendship Treaty between The People's Republic of China and The Democratic People's Republic of Korea or Sino-North Korean Mutual Aid and Cooperation Friendship Treaty	China; North Korea
1962	Thanat–Rusk Communiqué	Thailand; United States
1975–1994	Israel–South Africa Agreement (ISSA)	Israel; South Africa
1987	Major Non-NATO Ally (MNNA) (Note: Agreement applies only between the United States and Allied States)	List: Islamic Republic of Afghanistan (2012–2022); Argentina (since 1998); Australia; Bahrain (since 2002); Brazil (since 2019); Colombia (since 2022); Egypt; Israel; Japan; Jordan (since 1996); Kenya (since 2024); Kuwait (since 2004); Morocco (since 2004); New Zealand (since 1996); Pakistan (since 2004); Peru (since 2026); Philippines (since 2003); Qatar (since 2022); Saudi Arabia (since 2025); South Korea; Taiwan (since 2003) (Note: Taiwan is treated as an MNNA without formal designation); Thailand (since 2003); Tunisia (since 2015)
1995	Split Agreement	Croatia; Republic of Bosnia and Herzegovina
2010	Agreement on Strategic Partnership and Mutual Support (Note: See also Shusha Declaration)	Azerbaijan; Turkey
2010	Lancaster House Treaties	France; United Kingdom
2019	Treaty on Franco-German Cooperation and Integration or Aachen Treaty	France; Germany
2021	Franco-Greek defence agreement	France; Greece
2024	Treaty on Comprehensive Strategic Partnership between the Russian Federation and the Democratic People's Republic of Korea	North Korea; Russia
2025	Treaty between the United Kingdom of Great Britain and Northern Ireland and the Federal Republic of Germany on Friendship and Bilateral Cooperation or Kensington Treaty	Germany; United Kingdom
2025	Strategic Mutual Defence Agreement (SMDA)	Pakistan Saudi Arabia
2025	Pukpuk Treaty	Australia Papua New Guinea
2026	Ocean of Peace Alliance	Australia Fiji

== Multilateral military alliances ==
Legend
Active military alliances

Years	Name	Members
c. 7th century–338 BC	Latin League	About 30 villages and tribes in the region of Latium
c. 6th century–366 BC	Peloponnesian League	Various city-states in the Peloponnese, dominated by Sparta
478–404 BC	Delian League	See Members of the Delian League
1167–1250	Lombard League	Numerous cities in medieval Lombardy, modern Northern Italy
1266–1320	Byzantine–Mongol Alliance	Byzantine Empire; Golden Horde
1367–1385	Confederation of Cologne	Cities of the Hanseatic League
1428–1521	Triple Alliance (Note: The Nahua Triple Alliance is also known as the Mexica, or Aztec Empire)	Mexiclo-Tenochtitlan; Tetzcoco; Tlacopan
1508–1510	League of Cambrai	Aragon; Holy Roman Empire; Kingdom of France; Papal States
1511–1513	Catholic League (Italian)	Aragon; Holy Roman Empire; Kingdom of England; Papal States; Republic of Venice
1531–1547	Schmalkaldic League	Various Protestant German States of the Holy Roman Empire
1571–1573	Holy League	Papal States; Republic of Venice; Spain among others
1596–1604	Triple Alliance (1596)	Dutch Republic; Kingdom of England; Kingdom of France
1608–1621	Protestant Union	Various Protestant German States of the Holy Roman Empire
1609–1635	Catholic League (German)	Various Catholic German States of the Holy Roman Empire
1668–1672	Triple Alliance	Dutch Republic; Kingdom of England; Sweden
1684–1699	Holy League	Holy Roman Empire; Polish–Lithuanian Commonwealth; Republic of Venice; Tsardom of Russia
1689–1713	League of Augsburg	Dutch Republic; Holy Roman Empire; Kingdom of England
1699	Treaty of Preobrazhenskoye	Denmark–Norway; Electorate of Saxony; Polish–Lithuanian Commonwealth; Tsardom of Russia
1717–1718	Triple Alliance (1717)	Dutch Republic; Kingdom of France; Kingdom of Great Britain
1747–1748	Convention of Saint Petersburg	Kingdom of Great Britain; Russian Empire; Dutch Republic
1788–1791	Triple Alliance (1788)	Kingdom of Great Britain; Kingdom of Prussia; Dutch Republic
1815–1818	The Quadruple Alliance	United Kingdom; Austrian Empire; Kingdom of Prussia; Russian Empire
1815–1825 (Note: Austro-Russian alliance broke off in 1853.)	Holy Alliance	Russian Empire; Kingdom of Prussia; Austrian Empire
1865–1872	Treaty of the Triple Alliance	Brazil; Uruguay; Argentina
1866–1868	First Balkan Alliance	Kingdom of Greece (1867); Principality of Montenegro (1866); Principality of Serbia
1873–1887	League of the Three Emperors	Russian Empire; Austria–Hungary; German Empire
1882–1914	Triple Alliance	German Empire; Austria–Hungary; Kingdom of Italy
1907–1917	Triple Entente	France; Russian Empire; United Kingdom
1912–1913	Balkan League	Kingdom of Bulgaria; Greece; Kingdom of Montenegro; Kingdom of Serbia
1914–1918	Central Powers	Austria–Hungary; Kingdom of Bulgaria (1915); German Empire; Ottoman Empire
1916–1918	Treaty of Bucharest (1916)	France; Italy; Romania; Russian Empire; United Kingdom
1920–1938	Little Entente	Czechoslovakia; Romania; Yugoslavia
1934–1938	Balkan Pact	Greece; Romania; Turkey; Yugoslavia
1934–1938	Rome Protocols	Austria; Hungary; Italy
1934–1935	Stresa Front	France; Italy; United Kingdom
1934–1940	Baltic Entente	Estonia; Latvia; Lithuania
1940–1945	Tripartite Pact or Axis powers	List: Bulgaria Croatia Germany Hungary Italy Japan Romania Slovakia Yugoslavia (Note: (Two days only))
1942–1945	Croatian–Romanian–Slovak friendship proclamation	Croatia; Romania; Slovakia
1947	Inter-American Treaty of Reciprocal Assistance (TIAR) or Rio Treaty	List: Argentina; The Bahamas (since 1982); Bolivia (1947–2014); Brazil; Chile; Colombia; Costa Rica; Cuba (1947-1962); Dominican Republic; Ecuador (1947–2016); El Salvador; Guatemala; Haiti; Honduras; Mexico (1947–2004); Nicaragua (1947–2014); Panama; Paraguay; Peru; Trinidad and Tobago (since 1967); United States; Uruguay; Venezuela (1947–2015, since 2019)
1948–1954	Western Union (WU) (Note: See also Treaty of Brussels)	Belgium; France; Luxembourg; Netherlands; United Kingdom
1949	North Atlantic Treaty Organization (NATO)	List: Albania (since 2009); Belgium; Bulgaria (since 2004); Canada; Croatia (since 2009); Czech Republic (since 1999); Denmark; Estonia (since 2004); Finland (since 2023); France; Germany (since 1955); Greece (since 1952); Hungary (since 1999); Iceland; Italy; Latvia (since 2004); Lithuania (since 2004); Luxembourg; Montenegro (since 2017); Netherlands; North Macedonia (since 2020); Norway; Poland (since 1999); Portugal; Romania (since 2004); Slovakia (since 2004); Slovenia (since 2004); Spain (since 1982); Sweden (since 2024); Turkey (since 1952); United Kingdom; United States
1951	Australia, New Zealand, United States Security Treaty (ANZUS)	Australia; New Zealand; United States
1953–1956	Agreement of Friendship and Cooperation or Balkan Pact (1953)	Greece; Turkey; Yugoslavia
1954–1977	Southeast Asia Treaty Organization (SEATO)	List: Australia; France; New Zealand; Pakistan (1954–1973); Philippines; Thailand (Note: Treaty in-force with United States); United Kingdom; United States (Note: Treaty in-force with Thailand)
1954–2011	Western European Union (WEU)	List: Belgium; France; Germany (Note: Joined as West Germany until 1990); Greece (1995); Italy; Luxembourg; Netherlands; Portugal (1990); Spain (1990); United Kingdom
1955–1979	Central Treaty Organization (CENTO), formerly Middle East Treaty Organization (METO)	Iran; Iraq (1955–1959); Pakistan; Turkey; United Kingdom
1955–1991	Warsaw Pact (WP)	List: People's Socialist Republic of Albania (1955−1968); People's Republic of Bulgaria; Czechoslovak Socialist Republic; East Germany (1955–1990); Hungarian People's Republic; Polish People's Republic; Socialist Republic of Romania; Soviet Union
1970–1974	Alcora Exercise	Portugal; Rhodesia; South Africa
1982	Regional Security System (RSS)	List: Antigua and Barbuda; Barbados; Dominica; Grenada (1985); Guyana (2022); Saint Kitts and Nevis (1983); Saint Lucia; Saint Vincent and the Grenadines
1984	Unified Military Command (called the Peninsula Shield Force from 1984 to 2021) (Note: Military wing of Gulf Cooperation Council (GCC))	List: Bahrain; Kuwait; Oman; Qatar; Saudi Arabia; United Arab Emirates
1992	Collective Security Treaty Organization (CSTO)	List: Azerbaijan (1993-1999); Armenia; Belarus (1993); Georgia (1993-1999); Kazakhstan; Kyrgyzstan; Russia; Tajikistan; Uzbekistan (1992-1999; 2006–2012)
1994	Compact of Free Association (COFA)	Federated States of Micronesia; Marshall Islands; Palau; United States
2023	Alliance of Sahel States (AES)	Burkina Faso; Mali; Niger
2024	Trilateral alliance	Algeria; Libya; Tunisia
2025	Joint Border Coordination	Libya; Chad; Niger
2026	Multinational Maritime Defense Alliance	List: Saudi Arabia; Turkey; Pakistan; Bangladesh; Egypt; Qatar; Bahrain; Kuwait; Jordan; Djibouti; Sudan; Yemen; Somalia; Comoros
2026	Mecca Defence Alliance	Pakistan; Saudi Arabia; Turkey

=== Comparison of NATO and CSTO ===
NATO and CSTO states as of December 2024

Comparison of NATO and CSTO
Indicators	North Atlantic Treaty Organization (NATO)	Collective Security Treaty Organization (CSTO)
Emblem		
Flag		
Treaty	The North Atlantic Treaty	The Collective Security Treaty
System	Collective security	Collective security
Formation	1949	1992
Depositary	The Government of the United States of America, Washington, D.C.	The CSTO Secretariat, Moscow, Russia (Note: The CSTO Secretariat is the seat of the Secretary General of the CSTO. — "CSTO Secretariat". www.en.odkb-csto.org.)
Headquarters	Brussels, Belgium	Moscow, Russia
Secretary General	Secretary General of NATO; Mark Rutte	Secretary General of the CSTO; Taalatbek Masadykov
Senior Military Leaders	Chair of the NATO Military Committee; Admiral Giuseppe Cavo Dragone; Supreme Allied Commander Europe; General Alexus Grynkewich; Supreme Allied Commander Transformation; Admiral Pierre Vandier	Chief of the Joint Staff of the Collective Security Treaty Organization; Colonel General Andrey Serdyukov
Membership	32 states List: Albania; Belgium; Bulgaria; Canada; Croatia; Czech Republic; Denmark; Estonia; Finland; France; Germany; Greece; Hungary; Iceland; Italy; Latvia; Lithuania; Luxembourg; Montenegro; Netherlands; North Macedonia; Norway; Poland; Portugal; Romania; Slovakia; Slovenia; Spain; Sweden; Turkey; United Kingdom; United States	6 states List: Armenia; Belarus; Kazakhstan; Kyrgyzstan; Russia; Tajikistan
Former members	None	Azerbaijan (1993–1999); Georgia (1993–1999); Uzbekistan (1992–1999; 2006–2012)
Area km^{2} (sq mi)	25 million km^{2} (9.68 million sq mi)	20 million km^{2} (7.72 million sq mi) (Note: aggregated data for all members)
Population	973 million	193 million
GDP (PPP)	$63.842 trillion	$7.686 trillion
GDP (nominal)	$52.394 trillion	$2.394 trillion
Defence expenditure	$1.474 trillion	$153 billion
Total military personnel	6,163,060 (3,953,060) (Note: excl. USA and CAN)	4,028,000 (3,928,000) (Note: According to the US Secretary of State Marco Rubio, 100,000 Russian soldiers died in Ukraine in 2025 alone."Marco Rubio slams Russia over Ukrainian war death count, just days after Trump calls out 'bulls–t' Vladimir Putin". www.nypost.com. 10 July 2025.)
Nuclear warheads	4,215	4,299

== See also ==
- List of intergovernmental organizations
- List of treaties
- Defense pact
