= Valery Semerikov =

Russian military commander

- Валерий Семериков

Secretary General of the CSTO
- Acting
- In office 28 April 2003 – 31 December 2019
- Preceded by: Yuri Khatchaturov
- Succeeded by: Stanislav Zas
- In office 1 January 2017 – 2 May 2017
- Preceded by: Nikolay Bordyuzha
- Succeeded by: Yuri Khatchaturov

Personal details
- Born: 28 June 1954 (age 72) Borovista, Russian SFSR, Soviet Union

Military service
- Allegiance: USSR; Russia
- Years of service: 1971–2003
- Rank: Lieutenant General
- Battles/wars: Soviet–Afghan War

Lieutenant General Valery Anatolyevich Semerikov (Russian: Валерий Анатольевич Семериков; born 28 June 1954) is a Russian politician and military commander who had served as the acting Secretary General of the Collective Security Treaty Organization in 2017 and again from 2018 to 2019.

== Biography ==
Valery Semerikov was born in Borovitsa in Kirov Oblast on 28 June 1954.

In 1971, he entered the Kiev Higher Tank Engineering School, then served in the border troops.

In 1975, he served in the military in Transbaikalia on the border of the Soviet Union and China

In 1982, he was called to serve in Afghanistan. After returning from the war, he is appointed as deputy head of the Priargunsky border detachment.

In the late 1980s, he studied at the Military Academy of Armored Forces named after Marshal R. Ya. Malinovsky, after which he was sent to work at the Main Directorate of Border Troops with honors.

In 1994, he was appointed Deputy Commander of the North-Western Border District.

In 1995, he entered the Military Academy of the General Staff, from which he graduated with honors. Then he served in the central office of the Federal Border Service in the positions of chief of staff of armaments, in which he was the deputy director of the FPS.

In 2002, he was appointed First Deputy Director of the Border Service and was responsible for the arrangement of the state border in the Caucasus.

In 2003, he retired from the army to the reserve and worked in the CSTO Secretariat as Deputy Secretary General.

From 1 January 2017 to 13 April 2017, and from 1 November 2018 to 31 December 2019, he served as Acting Secretary General of the CSTO.

== Awards ==
He was awarded the Order of Friendship in 2007.

== Family ==
He is married and has a son, who is an army officer.
