= Imangali Tasmagambetov =

Kazakh politician (born 1956)

- Иманғали Тасмағамбетов
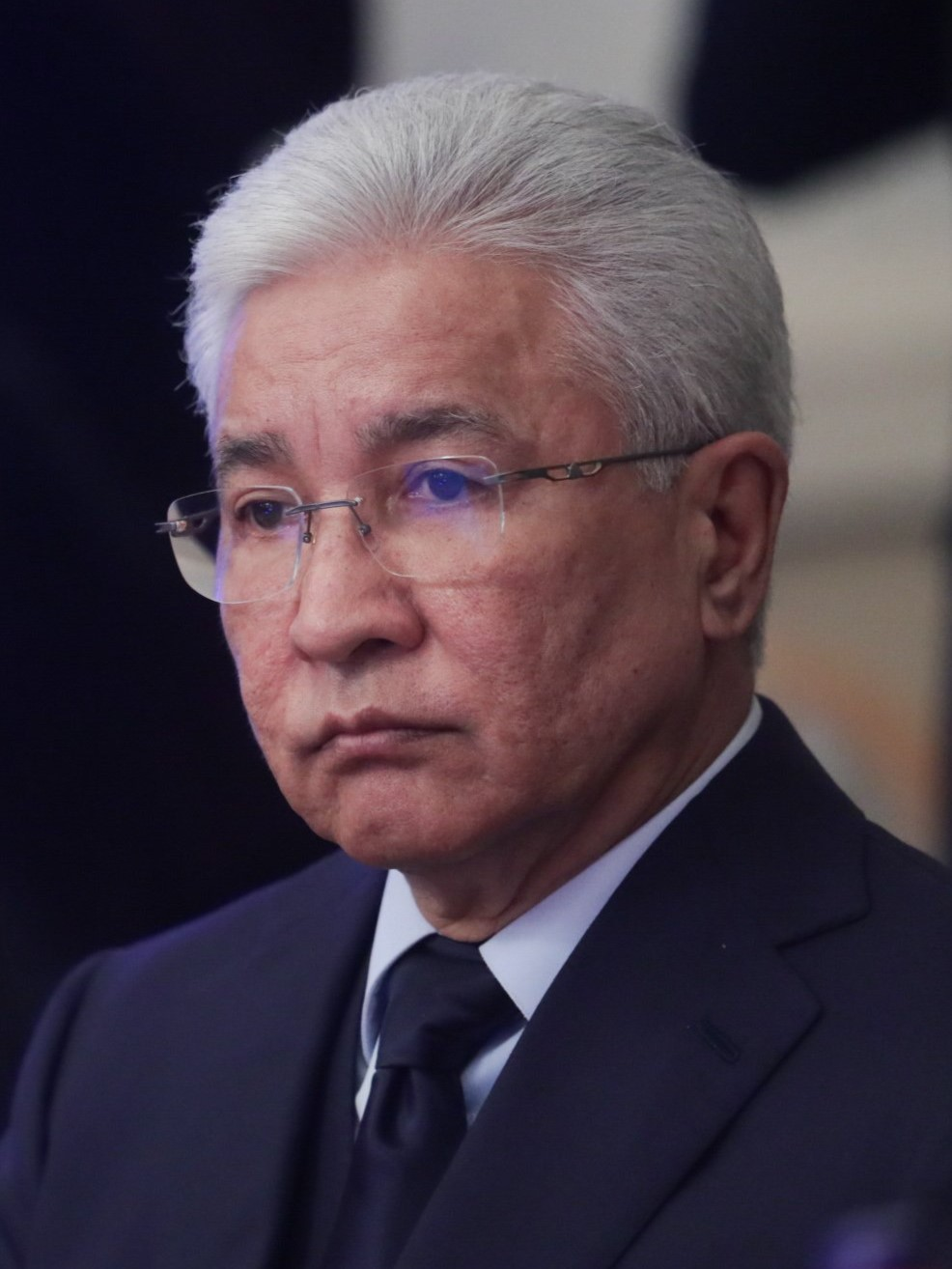
- Tasmagambetov in 2023

8th Secretary General of the CSTO
- In office 1 January 2023 – 31 December 2025
- Preceded by: Stanislav Zas
- Succeeded by: Taalatbek Masadykov

State Secretary of Kazakhstan
- In office 13 June 2003 – 9 March 2004
- President: Nursultan Nazarbayev
- Preceded by: Kassym-Jomart Tokayev
- Succeeded by: Oralbay Abdykarimov

Head of the Presidential Administration of Kazakhstan
- In office 10 March 2004 – 7 December 2004
- President: Nursultan Nazarbayev
- Preceded by: Nurtai Abykayev
- Succeeded by: Adilbek Zhaksybekov

Ambassador of Kazakhstan to Russia
- In office 3 February 2017 – 18 December 2019
- President: Nursultan Nazarbayev; Kassym-Jomart Tokayev
- Preceded by: Marat Tazhin
- Succeeded by: Ermek Kosherbaev

5th Prime Minister of Kazakhstan
- In office 28 January 2002 – 11 June 2003
- President: Nursultan Nazarbayev
- First Deputy: Aleksandr Pavlov
- Preceded by: Kassym-Jomart Tokayev
- Succeeded by: Daniyal Akhmetov

Deputy Prime Minister of Kazakhstan
- In office 12 September 2016 – 3 February 2017
- Prime Minister: Bakhytzhan Sagintayev
- In office 17 December 2000 – 28 January 2002
- Prime Minister: Kassym-Jomart Tokayev
- In office 13 March 1995 – 10 October 1999
- Prime Minister: Akezhan Kazhegeldin; Nurlan Balgimbayev; Kassym-Jomart Tokayev (Acting)

Minister of Defense
- In office 22 October 2014 – 12 September 2016
- President: Nursultan Nazarbayev
- Prime Minister: Karim Massimov; Bakhytzhan Sagintayev
- Preceded by: Serik Akhmetov
- Succeeded by: Saken Zhasuzakov

Minister of Education and Culture
- In office 17 March 1997 – 10 October 1997
- President: Nursultan Nazarbayev
- Prime Minister: Akezhan Kazhegeldin; Nurlan Balgimbayev; Kassym-Jomart Tokayev (Acting)
- Preceded by: Murat Jurynov (public education); Talgat Mamashev (culture)
- Succeeded by: Krymbek Kusherbayev (education, culture, healthcare)

6th Äkim of Astana
- In office 4 April 2008 – 22 October 2014
- Preceded by: Askar Mamin
- Succeeded by: Adilbek Zhaksybekov

Äkim of Almaty
- In office 9 December 2004 – 4 April 2008
- Preceded by: Viktor Khrapunov
- Succeeded by: Akhmetzhan Yesimov

Äkim of Atyrau Region
- In office 18 February 1999 – 16 December 2000
- Preceded by: Ravil Cherdabaev
- Succeeded by: Serikbek Daukeev

Personal details
- Born: 9 December 1956 (age 69) Novobogat, Atyrau Province, Kazakh SSR, USSR
- Party: Nur Otan
- Relations: Aselle Tasmagambetova (daughter); Kenes Rakishev (son-in-law)
- Education: West Kazakhstan State University

İmanğali Nūrğaliūly Тasmağambetov (Kazakh: Иманғали Нұрғалиұлы Тасмағамбетов, [imɑ́ɴʁɑɫí nʊrʁɑɫíjʊɫə́ tʰɑsmɑʁɑmb̥ʲétəf]; born 9 December 1956) is a Kazakh politician and diplomat, who was the Secretary-General of the Collective Security Treaty Organization from 2023 to 2025. He was the Kazakh Ambassador to Russia from 2017 to 2019. He was Deputy Prime Minister of Kazakhstan from 2016 to 2017 and Minister of Defense of Kazakhstan from 2014 to 2016. He was the akim of Astana from 2008 to 2014 and from 2004 to 2008, as akim of Almaty. Before that, from 2002 to 2003, he was the Prime Minister of Kazakhstan.

Tasmagambetov stated that he resigned as PM after finding out about the falsification of a positive vote of confidence in his administration that was taken on 19 May 2003. His resignation resulted in the dismissal of all members of his cabinet, as required by the Constitution of Kazakhstan.

President Nursultan Nazarbayev replaced Tasmagambetov with Pavlodar Region Akim Daniyal Akhmetov on 13 June 2003. Akhmetov pledged to maintain many of Tasmagambetov's policies.

Tasmagambetov was appointed as head of KazakhGolf Federation on 18 May 2022.

== Early life and career ==
Tasmagambetov was born in the village of Novobogat in Atyrau Region to Nurgali Tasmagambetov (1926–1997) and Dilda Qoqanova (1930–2019). In 1979, he graduated from the natural-geographical faculty of the West Kazakhstan State University, specializing in "teacher of geography and biology." In 1990, Tasmagambetov earned Ph.D in philosophy in his thesis "World outlook aspects of ecological problems". In 1997, he earned doctorate in political science in his dissertation “Social Policy in Transit Political Systems”.

Tasmagambetov began his career in 1973 as a boxing and wrestling trainer at a Children's and Youth Sports School in the village of Makhambet. After graduating, he worked as a teacher of geography and biology at the Makhambet Secondary School.

== Early political career ==
In 1989, Tasmagambetov was elected as the First Secretary of the Central Committee of the Komsomol in Kazakh SSR. In 1991, he became a chairman of the State Committee of the Republic of Kazakhstan on Youth Affairs.

From 1993 to 1995, Tasmagambetov worked as an assistant to the President of Kazakhstan. On 13 March 1995, he became the Deputy Prime Minister of Kazakhstan and from 17 March 1997, he served as the Minister of Education and Culture. That same year, Tasmagambetov was appointed as the Deputy Head of the Presidential Administration of Kazakhstan and the head of the Organizational and Control Department of the Presidential Administration. In 1998, he became the First Assistant to the President.

On 18 February 1999, Tasmagambetov was appointed as the akim of Atyrau Region and from 17 December 2000, he served as the Deputy Prime Minister in Tokayev Government.

== Prime Minister of Kazakhstan (2002–2003) ==
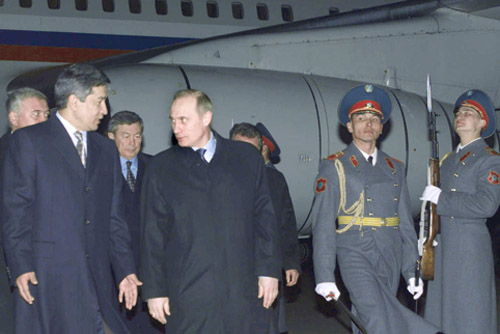
With Vladimir Putin, 28 February 2002

On 28 January 2002, Tasmagambetov was appointed as the Prime Minister of the Republic of Kazakhstan by a decree of President Nursultan Nazarbayev and subsequently received unanimous confirmation from the Parliament. His appointment occurred during a period of political consolidation, and he succeeded Kassym-Jomart Tokayev. The new government was tasked with ensuring macroeconomic stability, promoting sustainable growth, and enhancing institutional transparency.

During his tenure, Tasmagambetov introduced a strategic economic program aimed at achieving 5–7 percent annual GDP growth and reducing the national poverty rate from above 30 percent to below 20 percent. His policy priorities included the development of small and medium-sized enterprises (SMEs), the modernization of the agricultural sector, and targeted investment in downstream industrial production. He also advocated for deepened regional economic integration, notably through Kazakhstan's engagement with the Eurasian Economic Community, as part of a broader strategy to diversify the national economy.

In April 2002, Tasmagambetov publicly disclosed the existence of a previously undeclared state stabilization fund, established in 1996 from proceeds derived from the partial sale of the Tengiz oil field. With a total value of approximately US $1 billion, the fund had been utilized in 1997 to resolve pension arrears and again in 1998 to address the economic consequences of the Russian financial crisis. Under Tasmagambetov's government, the fund was incorporated into the formal legal framework of Kazakhstan's fiscal policy, marking a step toward greater transparency and institutional accountability in public financial management.

A key and controversial initiative of his premiership was the introduction of a land privatization bill to Parliament on 4 December 2002, representing the first substantial legislative move toward private ownership of agricultural land in Kazakhstan. The proposed reforms provoked significant debate within Parliament and among the public, with opponents contending that the measures favored affluent elites and undermined equitable access to land. In response to the political resistance, Tasmagambetov submitted a motion of confidence to the Mäjilis (the lower chamber of Parliament) on 19 May 2003, linking the outcome to the fate of the proposed legislation.

Subsequently, Tasmagambetov alleged that the procedural conduct of the parliamentary vote had been "falsified". On 11 June 2003, he formally submitted his letter of resignation to President Nazarbayev, leading to dissolution of the cabinet.

== Post-premiership ==
On 13 June 2003, he was appointed State Secretary of Kazakhstan, a senior advisory role within the presidential administration. He served that position until he was dismissed on 9 March 2004. The following day on 10 March, Tasmagambetov was appointed as the head of the Presidential Administration of Kazakhstan and was removed from the post on 7 December 2004.

=== Äkim of Almaty (2004–2008) ===
Tasmagambetov was appointed Äkim of Almaty on 8 December 2004, taking office during a critical period of rapid urban growth and modernization in Kazakhstan's largest city.

During his tenure, the city saw the construction of approximately 2.9 million square meters of residential housing, providing over 18,000 new apartments to meet the demands of a growing population. Significant investments were made in urban infrastructure, including the construction of 43 kilometers of new roads, ten major transport interchanges, and the renovation of 24 electrical substations to improve traffic flow and energy reliability. Under his leadership, the first Almaty Metro line's tunnels were completed, and feasibility studies for the second line were initiated, marking an important milestone in expanding the city's public transportation network.

Tasmagambetov's administration prioritized social infrastructure by commissioning 11 new schools and seven kindergartens, alongside modernizing existing educational facilities. The healthcare system was also strengthened with the commencement of construction on eight medical facilities, including an emergency hospital, several polyclinics, and a perinatal center, enhancing the accessibility and quality of health services in Almaty.

A landmark achievement of his tenure was the opening of Kazakhstan's first municipal waste recycling plant in Almaty in 2007. This facility represented a pioneering effort to address the city's environmental challenges by modernizing waste management and promoting sustainability in line with global environmental standards.

Recognizing the importance of balancing development with cultural heritage, Tasmagambetov initiated the Cultural Heritage of Almaty program between 2007 and 2009. The program included projects such as the creation of the Borolday Scythian burial mounds archaeological park and the museification of the historic site of the former Verny Fortress, preserving the city's historical identity amid modernization.

Tasmagambetov's tenure was not without controversy. In 2006, conflicts arose in residential districts such as Shanyraq and Baikai due to disputes over land rights and redevelopment plans, leading to violent unrest between local residents and municipal authorities. Additionally, the closure of the international music festival Voice of Asia in 2006 sparked public criticism. Nevertheless, a 2016 opinion survey conducted by NewTimes.kz indicated that a majority of Almaty residents—approximately 51%—approved of his policies and leadership.

=== Äkim of Astana (2008–2014) ===
From 4 April 2008, he served as the akim of Astana. While holding that post, Tasmagambetov was chosen to be the chairman of the Astana City Branch of Nur Otan on 19 May 2008.

Astana became the first place in the provision of housing to the population. The number of problem sites was reduced from 243 to two. In 2012–2013, two hospitals and two polyclinics were commissioned. The opera and ballet theater Astana Opera and the Palace of Schoolchildren were built, while the construction of the cathedral mosque Hazrat Sultan Mosque began. A locomotive plant, a plant for the production of reinforced concrete products, pipes made of polymer materials, and helicopter plant were commissioned and put into operation.

=== Defense and Deputy Minister (2014–2017) ===
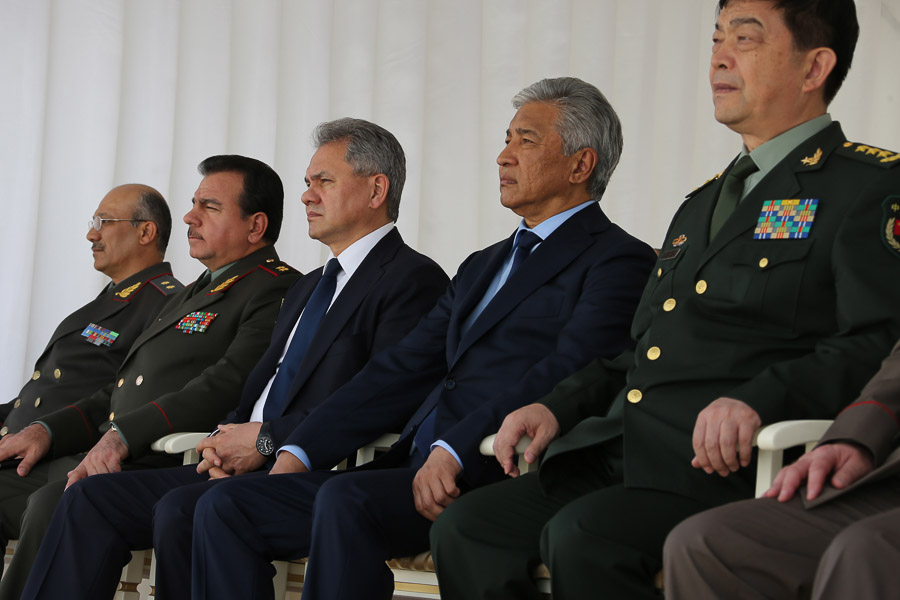
Tasmagambetov with the other Defense Ministers of the SCO during a festival of Military Massed Bands in 2015.

From 22 October 2014 to 12 September 2016, Tasmagambetov served as a Minister of Defense under Massimov. The following day on 13 September, he was appointed as a Deputy Prime Minister again in Sagintayev's cabinet.

=== Ambassador of Kazakhstan to Russia (2017–2019) ===
On 3 February 2017, Tasmagambetov became an Ambassador of Kazakhstan to Russia to where he presented his credentials to Russian President Vladimir Putin on 16 March 2017.

His sudden appointment to the position led to suspicions that Nazarbayev felt politically threatened by his ally, as the move rendered Tasmagambetov constitutionally prohibited from running for President.

He served in the role until 18 December 2019, when by the decree of President Kassym-Jomart Tokayev, Tasmagambetov was removed from his post, dismissed from public service and sent to a retirement pension.

=== Secretary General of CSTO (2023–present) ===
On 1 January 2023, Tasmagambetov assumed office as Secretary General of the CSTO, following his unanimous appointment by the CSTO Collective Security Council on 23 November 2022, replacing Belarusian Stanislav Zas and making him the first Kazakhstani person to hold the title.

During his tenure, Tasmagambetov has prioritized strengthening the CSTO's military potential and enhancing the organization's crisis response capabilities. In 2023, his leadership focused on improving decision-making procedures for the deployment of collective security forces and updating the legal frameworks governing military cooperation.

In 2024, coinciding with Kazakhstan's chairmanship of the CSTO, Tasmagambetov outlined a set of key objectives: implementing decisions adopted at the November 2023 CSTO summit, bolstering the organization's rapid response mechanisms—particularly in light of the experience from the January 2022 unrest in Kazakhstan—and deepening partnerships with international organizations such as the United Nations, the CIS, and the Shanghai Cooperation Organisation.

== Awards ==
=== Kazakhstan ===
- Order of Parasat
- Order of Nazarbayev
- Medal "10 years of Astana"
- Order of the Leopard
- Medal "20 years of Independence of the Republic of Kazakhstan"

=== Foreign ===
- Order of Friendship (Russia)
- Order of Holy Prince Daniel of Moscow (Russia)
- Order of Glory and Honor (Russia)

Political offices
Preceded by Kassym-Jomart Tokayev	Prime Minister of Kazakhstan; 2002–2003	Succeeded by Daniyal Akhmetov
