= Barak Abramov =

Israeli businessman (born 1979)

Barak Abramov (Hebrew: ברק אברמוב; born 1979) is an Israeli businessman. He rose from a franchisee to the owner of the Japanika restaurant chain and consolidated his other restaurant assets into Andorra Investments Group. He was the owner of Bnei Yehuda Tel Aviv F.C. from 2016 to 2021, winning the Israel State Cup twice but being relegated from the Israeli Premier League. The following year, he became owner of Beitar Jerusalem F.C.

== Early and personal life ==
Abramov grew up in Nahalat Yitzhak, Tel Aviv, and attended school in neighbouring Givatayim. He began working for a florist when he was 12, and served for 18 months in the Israel Defense Forces before being released with a herniated disc; he suffered subsequent back issues for decades.

In January 2023, three men were arrested for an alleged armed robbery of Abramov's Tel Aviv apartment. As of 2022, Abramov has two daughters and a son.

== Business career ==
At age 20, Abramov became a dishwasher at a Tel Aviv café and rose to be manager. He became a partner at the Japanika restaurant on Rothschild Boulevard and then a franchise holder before buying the chain outright. He consolidated his restaurant assets into Andorra Invenstments Group, which generated an estimated ₪700 million in 2022.

As owner of the football club Bnei Yehuda Tel Aviv F.C. from 2016, Abramov won the Israel State Cup in 2017 and 2019, but suffered relegation from the Israeli Premier League a year later. His Japanika chain was also the league's first sponsor, for an annual deal of ₪3.2 million, and he estimated that the publicity brought him three times that fee.

In 2018, Abramov was arrested for allegedly laundering money for organised crime. He said that his ₪25 million withdrawals from his company accounts were for his expensive personal life of holidays and parties. He was released without charge.

After selling Bnei Yehuda at the end of 2021, Abramov spent the following summer bidding for Beitar Jerusalem F.C., the team he supports. He secured the deal to buy the club from Moshe Hogeg, after former mayor of Jerusalem Nir Barkat raised ₪2 million (US$600,000) from an anonymous South African donor.
