= Nikolay Bordyuzha =

Russian colonel general and politician

- Николай Бордюжа
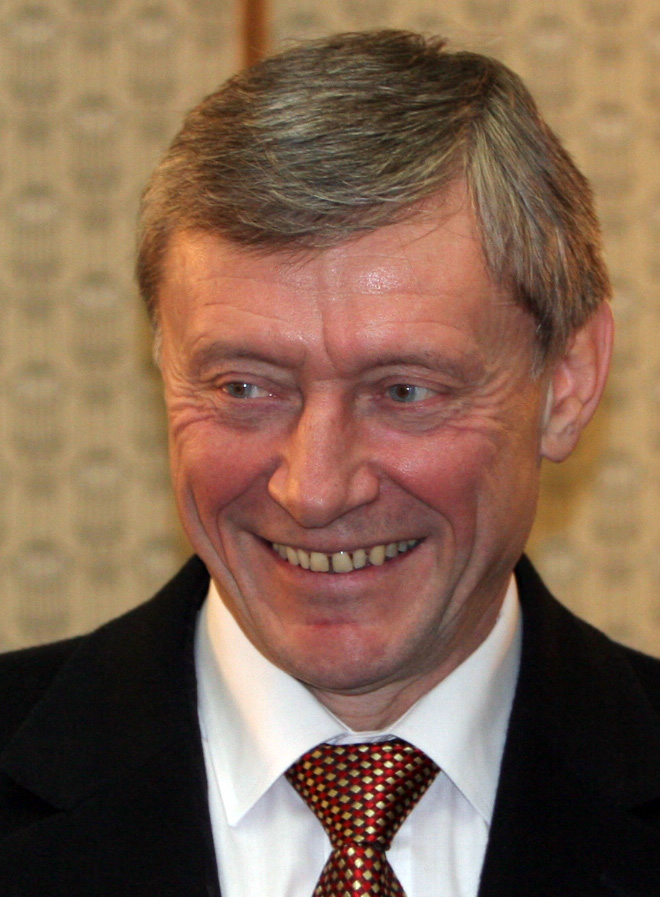
- Bordyuzha in 2007

3rd Secretary General of the CSTO
- In office 28 April 2003 – 2 May 2017
- Preceded by: Valeriy Nikolayenko
- Succeeded by: Valery Semerikov

Head of the Russian Presidential Administration
- In office 7 December 1998 – 19 March 1999
- Preceded by: Valentin Yumashev
- Succeeded by: Aleksandr Voloshin

Secretary of the Security Council of Russia
- In office 14 September 1998 – 19 March 1999
- Preceded by: Andrei Kokoshin
- Succeeded by: Vladimir Putin

Director of the Federal Border Service
- In office 26 January 1998 – 14 September 1998
- Preceded by: Andrei Nikolayev
- Succeeded by: Konstantin Totsky

Personal details
- Born: Nikolay Nikolayevich Bordyuzha; 20 October 1949 (age 77) Oryol, RSFSR, Soviet Union

Military service
- Allegiance: USSR; Russia
- Branch/service: Soviet Army; Russian Ground Forces
- Years of service: 1968–present
- Rank: Colonel-General

Nikolay Nikolayevich Bordyuzha (Russian: Николай Николаевич Бордюжа; born 20 October 1949) is a Russian general and politician.

== Biography ==
In 1972, he graduated from Perm Military School of the High Command of the Russian Strategic Rocket Forces and later attended KGB intelligence courses in Novosibirsk.

From 1989 to 1991, he was Head of KGB human resources, and from 1992 to 1998 served as First Deputy Chief and later Chief of Russia's FSB Border Service of Russia.

On 7 December 1998, he was appointed Secretary of the Security Council of Russia, and also Chief of the Russian presidential administration. He served in this position until 18 March 1999. During this period he was viewed by some analysts as a possible successor to President Boris Yeltsin.

From 1999 to 2003, Bordyuzha served as the Russian ambassador to Denmark.

On 28 April 2003, he was appointed Secretary General of the Collective Security Treaty Organization, a military pact of the Commonwealth of Independent States and held that position until December 2016.

He holds the rank of Colonel General.

== Honours and awards ==
=== Russian Federation ===
- Order For Merit to the Fatherland, 4th class
- Order of Courage
- Order of Friendship
- Medal For Distinction in Protection of the State Borders
- Medal "In Commemoration of the 850th Anniversary of Moscow"

=== Soviet Union ===
- Medals "For Distinction in Military Service" 1st and 2nd classes
- Jubilee Medal "50 Years of the Armed Forces of the USSR"
- Jubilee Medal "60 Years of the Armed Forces of the USSR"
- Jubilee Medal "70 Years of the Armed Forces of the USSR"
- Medals "For Impeccable Service" 1st, 2nd and 3rd classes

=== Foreign ===
- Order of Friendship (Kazakhstan)
- Order of Friendship of Peoples (Belarus)

== See also ==
- Commanders of the border troops USSR and RF
- Shanghai Cooperation Organisation

Preceded by Andrey Kokoshin	Secretary of the Security Council of Russia; 1998 - 1999	Succeeded by Vladimir Putin
Preceded by Valentin Yumashev	Chief of the Russian presidential administration 7 December 1998, – March 1999	Succeeded by Alexander Voloshin
