= Konstantin Totsky =

Russian diplomat (1950–2018)

- Константин Тоцкий
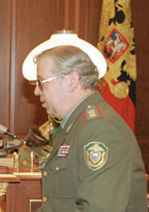
- Totsky in 2001

Permanent Representative of Russia to NATO
- In office 16 May 2003 – 9 January 2008
- Preceded by: Sergey Kislyak
- Succeeded by: Dmitry Rogozin

Director of the Federal Border Service of Russia
- In office 16 September 1998 – 11 March 2003
- Preceded by: Nikolay Bordyuzha
- Succeeded by: Vladimir Pronichev (as director of the FSB Border Service)

Personal details
- Born: 23 February 1950 Kagan, Uzbek SSR
- Died: 23 August 2018 Moscow, Russia
- Resting place: Federal Military Memorial Cemetery
- Education: KGB Moscow Higher Border Command School; Frunze Military Academy; General Staff Military Academy

Military service
- Allegiance: Soviet Union; Russia
- Branch/service: Soviet Armed Forces; Russian Armed Forces
- Years of service: 1963-2005
- Rank: Army general

Konstantin Vasilyevich Totsky (Russian: Константин Васильевич Тоцкий; February 23, 1950 – August 23, 2018) was a Russian military officer and diplomat who served as director of the Federal Border Service of Russia from 1998 to 2003 and as Permanent Representative of Russia to NATO from 2003 to 2008. He held the rank of General of the Army and the diplomatic rank of Ambassador Extraordinary and Plenipotentiary.

== Biography ==
Born on February 23, 1950 in the city of Kagan in the Uzbek SSR in the family of a military man. In 1956, the Totskikh family moved to the city of Yelets in the Lipetsk Oblast, where Totsky completed a ten-year school.

In 1967, he entered the KGB Moscow Higher Border Command School, after graduating in 1971, he was assigned to the North-Western Border District as deputy head of the Allakurtynsky border detachment. A few months later, he became head of the eighth border outpost of the Murmansk border detachment.

In 1974, he entered the border troops faculty of the Frunze Military Academy, after graduating from which he served in the Pacific Border District with the rank of senior lieutenant. From 1977 to 1980, he served as commandant of the Yuzhno-Sakhalinsk border detachment. In 1980, he served for three months as an officer in the 1st department of the headquarters of the Pacific Border District of the KGB in Vladivostok, then for a year as deputy chief of staff of the Yuzhno-Sakhalinsk border detachment. In 1981-1985, he was chief of staff of the Nakhodka border detachment.

From 1985 to 1988 he served as chief of the Khorog border detachment of the Central Asian Border District in the Tajik SSR on the border with Afghanistan. He took part in combat operations against the mujahideen in Afghanistan.

From November 1989 to 1991 he served as chief of the Lenkoran border detachment in Azerbaijan. In 1991, he was appointed deputy chief of staff of the Transcaucasian border district. In 1994, after graduating from the General Staff Military Academy, he was appointed Chief of Staff of the North-West Border District. In December of the same year, he was awarded the rank of Major General.

Since 1996 he served as Chief of the Academy of the Federal Border Service of the Russian Federation. From September 1998 to March 2003, he was Director of the Federal Border Service of the Russian Federation. Since January 2001, as Director of the Federal Border Service, he was part of the Operational Headquarters for the Management of Counter-Terrorism Activities in the North Caucasus Region, created by decree of the President of the Russian Federation. In March 2003, he was relieved of his post as Director of the Federal Border Service, which was transferred to the subordination of the Federal Security Service.

On May 16, 2003, he was appointed to the post of Permanent Representative of Russia to NATO. In accordance with decree of the President of Russia of February 5, 2007, Totsky was awarded the diplomatic rank of Ambassador Extraordinary and Plenipotentiary. On January 9, 2008, he was relieved of his duties as Permanent Representative of Russia to NATO.

In July 2009, he was appointed to the post of Deputy Head of Federal Service for Supervision of Natural Resources.

He was buried at the Federal Military Memorial Cemetery.

He was married to Nadezhda Petrovna (born 1950), an agronomist by profession. They had two daughters, Alla Konstantinovna (born 1974) and Elena Konstantinovna (born 1981), grandson: Artem Konstantinovich Totsky (born 2004).

== Awards ==
- Order "For Merit to the Fatherland" IV degree (2000)
- Order of Honour (October 24, 2007) - for a major contribution to the implementation of the foreign policy of the Russian Federation
- Order of the Red Banner (1987) - for courage shown during the provision of international assistance to the Democratic Republic of Afghanistan
- Medal "For Battle Merit" (1987)
- Medal "For Distinction in Guarding the State Border of the USSR" (1982)
- Gratitude of the President of Russia (1999, 2002)
- Certificate of Honor of the Government of the Russian Federation (February 10, 2000) - for services to the state and many years of impeccable service in the country's security agencies
- Order of Friendship of Peoples (December 30, 2002, Belarus) - for services in ensuring the security of the Union State.
- Grand Officer of the Order of the Star of Italian Solidarity (April 22, 2008)
- Medal "Dank" (June 12, 2002, Kyrgyzstan) - for services in the development of military-technical cooperation and strengthening the border service of the Kyrgyz Republic
- Honorary weapon: PSM pistols and an RSA revolver
- Certificate of the Commonwealth of Independent States (June 1, 2001) for active work to strengthen and develop the Commonwealth of Independent States
