= Aselle Tasmagambetova =

Kazakh political figure

- Әсел Тасмағамбетова
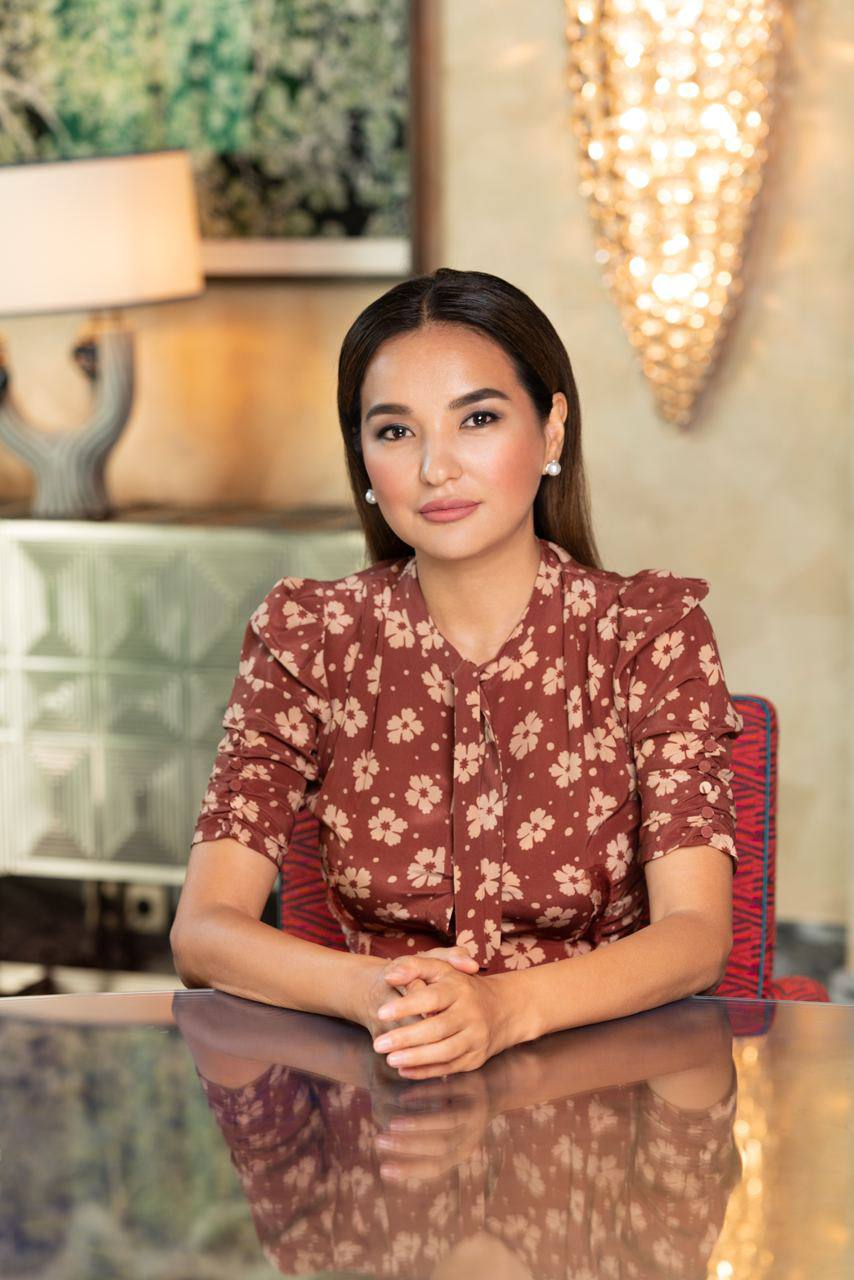
- Born: October 27, 1979 (age 46); Makhambet
- Citizenship: Kazakhstan
- Spouse: Kenes Rakishev
- Father: Imangali Tasmagambetov
- Website: aselletasmagambetova.com

Aselle Tasmagambetova (born October 27, 1979) is the daughter of former Kazakh Prime Minister Imangali Tasmagambetov. She has been married for two decades to Kenes Rakishev, a wealthy Kazakh businessperson.

== Career ==
Born October 27, 1979, she is the daughter of the Kazakh politician Imangali Tasmagambetov. She graduated from Kazakh State Law University with degree in Jurispridence in 1999, then graduated from International Independent University of Environmental and Politology in Moscow with degree in Management of the environment and natural resources in 2009.

She has taught environmental law in Al-Farabi Kazakh National University. In 2012 she established Central Asian Institute for Ecological Research. In 2019 she created the Center for Research and Rehabilitation of Caspian seal in Aktau city. She runs a charity, the "Saby" Private Charity Foundation.

== Personal life ==
Tasmagambetova is married to Kenes Rakishev.

== Awards and titles ==
- Order of Kurmet (2016)
- Honorary citizen of Semey
