= Mobli =

Former social mobile photo and video-sharing website

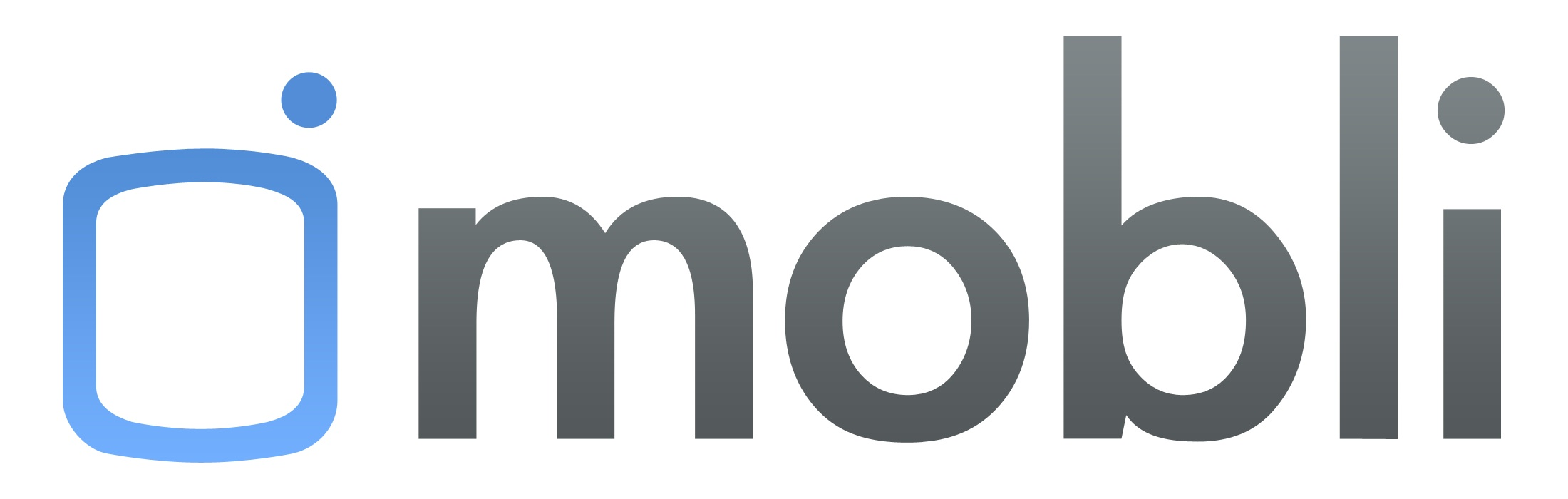

- Mobli homescreen
- Owner: Moshe Hogeg
- Website: www.mobli.com
- Launched: 2010
- Current status: Defunct

Mobli was a social mobile photo and video-sharing website founded by Israeli entrepreneurs and brothers Moshe and Oded Hogeg. In 2016, the service was shut down and the company placed into bankruptcy.

The Israel-based company had very high expectations to compete with similarly-purposed rivals Vine and Instagram. but never managed to attain a reliable user base and was shut down in mid-2016.

== Design ==
CEO and founder Moshe Hogeg said Mobli's goal is to “make it possible to see what is happening in the world through other people’s eyes.”

Mobli's mobile app allows mobile sharing of photos and video recorded on mobile devices to its website where other users can view the content. Users can browse the websites content feeds in real time by location, subject, or uploader.

Hogeg compared the service to Instagram saying, “If the substance of Instagram is effects of pictures and shares, we want to offer the option of seeing what is happening at the Eiffel Tower or at Barcelona’s Camp Nou Stadium.”

Mobli apps were initially built in HTML5 but this approach was abandoned due to poor performance. The apps were re-built in native code on iOS and Android while dropping support for BlackBerry in favor of Windows Phone. The new apps, also with a re-designed user experience, were slated to roll out in late 2012 starting with its Windows Phone app.

A stand-alone search product that emphasizes location, time and relevance was slated to launch in early 2013. The product has an "autotagging" feature that can recognize and identify certain objects from images.

Mobli's main revenue stream was on-site advertising.

== History ==
Mobli was founded in 2010 by Moshe Hogeg, Oded Hogeg, and Emmanuel Merali. Moshe Hogeg was the chief executive officer, Yossi Shemesh was Vice President - Production and Emmanuel Merali was the chief technology officer.

Francis Bea of Digital Trends said Mobli, which he called “[potentially] the YouTube of short-form video,” could succeed in debuting the next generation of Internet personalities with YouTube “beginning to sway under the weight of its own hosted talent.”

Mobli found early success in celebrity investors including American actor Leonardo DiCaprio who supposedly invested $4 million in 2011. It was later revealed that DiCaprio's investment was actually less than $10. DiCaprio's social involvement on the site attracted other celebrities.

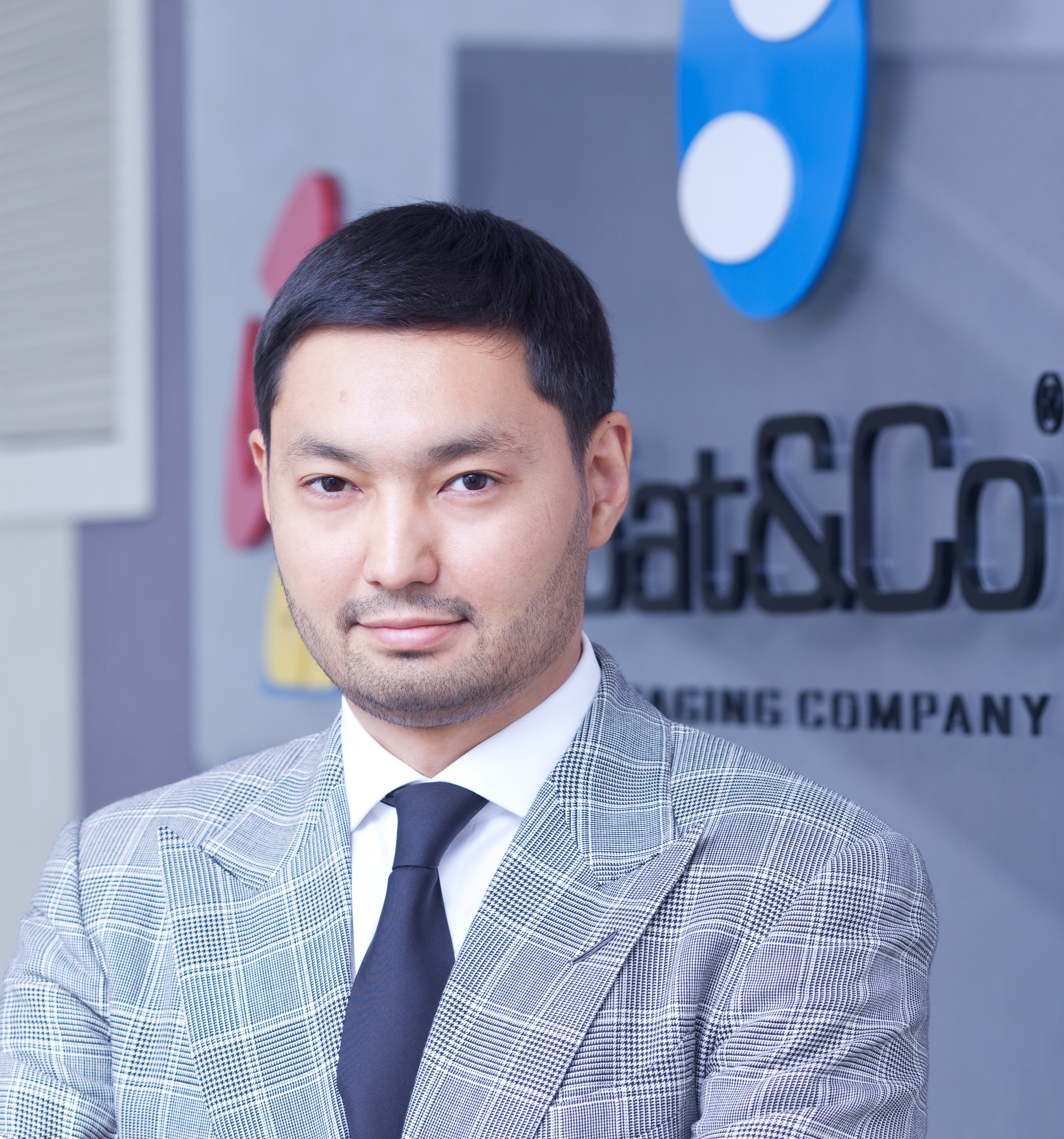
Mobli investor and board member Kenges Rakishev

In May 2012, CEO Hogeg said the company was prioritizing increasing Mobli's installed base on mobile devices from three million to 10 million before focusing on turning a profit. Hogeg planned to experiment with money-making strategies such as selling virtual goods, promoting sponsored posts and displaying targeted advertising. Mobli partnered with Tropfest to host the festival's first Micro Film Festival contest, run by Mobli investor, actor Tobey Maguire, on Mobli's TropfestMicro channel, a channel Mobli calls “a film festival in your pocket.” The contest, announced by Maguire in June at Tropfest Las Vegas, uses the designated Mobli channel as the hub for submitting and viewing short-form videos until deadline in January 2013. The best video, selected by panel, receives $10,000 in winnings and will debut at Tropfest Australia 2013.

The Canyons used Mobli in July 2012 to cast the role of Caitlin, a role that went to Lauren Schacher who was one of 125 who submitted auditions using the platform.

In July 2012, Mobli announced tennis player Serena Williams had invested an undisclosed amount in Mobli.

In September 2012, Mobli was worth an estimated $100–300 million and Mobli said shared content had tripled over the previous two months. A series B venture round of funding to develop its platform and user base brought in $22 million including $20 million from Kazakhstani businessman Kenges Rakishev. Rakishev's funding earned him a spot on Mobli's board.

In November 2012, a photo of cyclist and Mobli investor Lance Armstrong relaxing in his trophy room and posted to Mobli by Armstrong accumulated more than 320,000 views in two days making it the most trafficked Mobli post for a 48-hour period.

By November 2012, Mobli had received two different acquisition offers.

On November 6, 2013, Mobli announced that they raised 60 million dollars from América Móvil the Latin American telco giant led by billionaire Carlos Slim.

In June 2015, Mobli launched an image search engine named EyeIn. The feature was discontinued after Instagram blocked Mobli from their API.

In May 2016 Mobli laid off its remaining Israel staff, retaining only its staff at its Europe operation. Later that year the company declared bankruptcy and fully closed down.
