= Kenes Rakishev =

Kazakh investor and entrepreneur (b. 1979)

Kenges Rakishev
- Кеңес Хамытұлы Рақышев
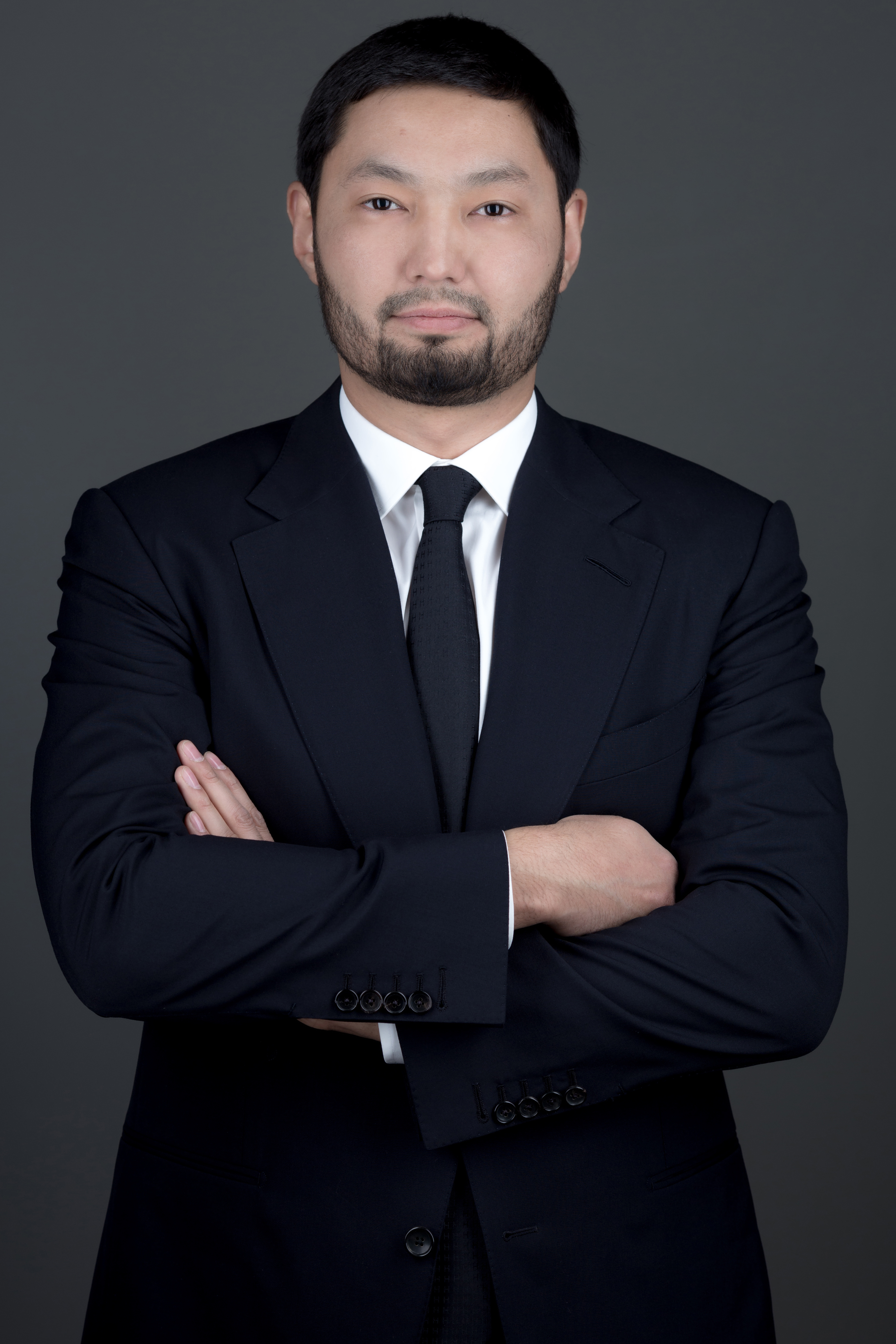
- Born: July 14, 1979 (age 47); Almaty, Kazakhstan
- Citizenship: Kazakhstan
- Education: Saïd Business School, University of Oxford
- Alma mater: Kazakh Economic University
- Employer: Fincraft Group
- Organization: Saby Foundation
- Spouse: Aselle Tasmagambetova
- Honours: Order of Kurmet
- Website: https://kengesrakishev.com

Kenges Rakishev (Kazakh: Кеңес Хамытұлы Рақышев; Russian: Кенес Хамитович Ракишев), also written Kenes, is a Kazakhstani businessperson. He is the son-in-law of former Kazakh Prime Minister, Imangali Tasmagambetov.

He is the president and main shareholder of Fincraft Resources, a company listed in the Kazakhstan Stock Exchange, and is an active investor in natural resources, mining, energy and food security, as well as in venture capital.

He has been on Forbes Kazakhstan lists since 2013. As of 2025, he occupies a position as the 23rd richest person on the list, with an estimated wealth of $435 million.

== Early career ==
Rakishev studied law at the Kazakh National Law Academy and international economics at the Kazakh Economic University.

In the late 1990s, he began his career as an advisor to the Road Safety Fund under the Ministry of Internal Affairs of the Republic of Kazakhstan. Following this role, he took on the position of manager at JSC KazTransGas in 2000. From 2000 to 2002, he worked as a specialist and later as the head of the Marketing Department of the Material and Technical Supply Department at Intergas Central Asia CJSC.

In 2002, he was appointed head of the Foreign Economic Activity Department at KazTransGas CJSC, to be later appointed First Deputy General Director for Export at KazMunaiGas Trading House LLP from January to October 2003. He would serve as Deputy General Director for Marketing at KazTransGas CJSC from 2003 to 2004. In 2004, he became the General Director of Mercury LLP.

== Investment career ==
He has been chairman of Net Element, and Fincraft Resources (formerly SAT & CO) which is listed at the Kazakhstan Stock Exchange after its new name.

=== Fincraft Resources (SAT & CO) ===
Since 2008 Rakishev has been chairman of SAT & Company JSC, an investment company within the mining industry and construction industry.

In 2008, SAT & CO successfully went public through a direct listing on KASE. During 2007 and 2008, the company expanded its reach into the metallurgical sector, acquiring strategic assets including corporations producing ferromanganese, chromium, nickel, and other minerals, as well as metallurgical plants in Kazakhstan and abroad.

In 2018, SAT & Company changed its name to Fincraft Resources JSC. By 2010, Fincraft Resources had investments in over 50 corporations involved in metallurgy, oilfields, venture investments, and mining-related activities.

The company is still listed at KASE and serves as Rakishev's main investment vehicle.

=== Kazakhstan Engineering ===
In 2014, Rakishev joined the board of directors of JSC National Company Kazakhstan Engineering, a large holding combining 27 enterprises of the defence industry and munitions factories. He left the board one year later, upon the appointment of Imangali Tasmagambetov as the new Minister of Defence.

=== BTA Bank ===
In 2014, Rakishev bought the shares of BTA Bank from the Kazakh government after Kazakh dictator Nursultan Nazarbayev forcibly nationalized it in 2009 and seized it from Mukhtar Ablyazov, accused of fraud. At the moment of Rakishev's acquisition, the bank had 640,000 private customers and 75,000 corporate clients. The main assets of the company were its claims against Ablyazov, estimated at $5 billion.

On February 6, 2014, JSC Kazkommertsbank and Rakishev reached a final agreement to acquire 46.5% of the shares of JSC BTA Bank each from JSC National Welfare Fund Samruk-Kazyna. The acquisition and subsequent merger of BTA and KKB were expected to create the largest commercial bank in the region. On February 14, 2014, Rakishev became the new chairman of BTA Bank's board of directors.

He sold his stake in BTA Bank in Kyrgyzstan in 2019, and in BTA Belarus in June 2024.

=== Kazkommertsbank ===
On January 19, 2015, Rakishev was elected as a new member of the board of directors of JSC Kazkommertsbank. In March 2015, he purchased enough shares of Kazkommertsbank to become a major shareholder.

By the beginning of August 2015, Rakishev increased his stake in Kazkommertsbank to 28.67% and then announced the preliminary agreement with Alnair Capital Holding (another large shareholder of the bank, controlling 28.08% of shares) to combine their respective shareholdings in Kazkommertsbank. As a result of the proposed transaction, Rakishev would acquire legal ownership over the parent entity of JSC Alnair Capital Holding, becoming its General Partner and effectively acquiring control over voting and other rights of Alnair's in the bank, controlling 56.75% of the bank's shares in total.

In April 2016 Rakishev significantly increased his stake in Kazkommertsbank after reaching an agreement with Nurzhan Subkhanberdin and JSC Central Asian Investment Company (CAIC). As a result, Rakishev's direct holding in KKB increased from 28.67% to 43.15%, and he directly and indirectly (through JSC Qazaq Financial Group) controls 71.23% of KKB common shares.

=== Central Asia Metals ===
In 2013, Rakishev exchanged a 40% stake in the Kounrad copper project in Kazakhstan for a 20% stake in Central Asia Metals Plc. CAML was listed in the AIM segment of the London Stock Exchange. He was then appointed a non-executive director. In 2017, CAML raised $186.6 million through an additional issue to purchase the Sasa zinc deposit in Macedonia from Lynx Resources Limited for $402.5 million.

In 2018, he sold his stake in the mining conglomerate and left the board of the company. During his time at the company, its value increased from $100 million to $500 million.

=== Petropavlovsk PLC ===
In 2018, he invested in a 22% share of Petropavlovsk, a then distressed Russian mining company. He bought the stake from Viktor Vekselberg, who exited the company after a boardroom dispute with its founders. Playing the role of activist investor, he purchased his initial shares for about five pence per share, pushing management changes after a near-collapse in 2014. He joined the board and became its majority shareholder.

Rakishev sold the stake in Petropavlovsk a year later to Roman Trotsenko. In July 2019, he exited the company at around 9.8 pence per share. Rakishev said he would invest the proceeds of his Petropavlovsk exit in a cobalt and nickel project.

=== Kaznickel ===
After divesting from Petropavlovsk Plc., Rakishev invested on Kaznickel, a nickel and cobalt company, in 2019. The company extracted nickel and cobalt in the Abai Region of Kazakhstan, materials necessary for electric vehicle batteries.

=== Mining investments ===
In December 2022, he acquired a 50% stake in the British Equus Petroleum Limited, a British company that operates in Kazakhstan through Kumkol Trans Service LLP, exploits the Sarybulak oil and gas fields in Kazakhstan.

In early 2024, his company Fincraft Resources notified KASE of the acquisition of a 50% stake in Nomad West Oil LLP, a company founded in May 2023 with exploration and production rights to the Tastobe site in Mangistau.

In September 2024, Mr. Rakishev bought 40% of the oil and gas company Beineu Petroleum Ltd, as announced in a public filing. Beineu Petroleum Limited is working to begin drilling two wells in the Beineu district of Mangistau region to explore for oil and gas deposits.

Later, with Shukhrat Ibragimov, Rakishev acquired the shares of JSC Shubarkol Premium, which runs a large coal mining operation in the Karaganda region. The company is listed on the Kazakhstan Stock Exchange.

In October 2024 he agreed to acquire 26.95% of the issued and outstanding ordinary shares of Tethys Petroleum Limited, an oil and gas company focused on Central Asia.

=== Oxus Capital ===
Rakishev founded Nasdaq-listed Oxus Acquisition Corp., a SPAC, which raised $172.5 million in 2021 through its IPO. Oxus merged in February 2024 with Borealis Foods Inc. via a business combination agreement. Borealis Foods produces instant ramen noodle meals sold in the U.S. and Canada.

== Venture capital ==
Rakishev was chairman of the board of Net Element, a Nasdaq-listed company investing in tech ventures. Net Element started at a $300 million valuation and was valued at $40 million by 2018. In 2021, Net Element merged with Mullen Automotive, an American automotive and electric vehicle manufacturer headquartered in Brea, California.

He was also a member of the board of Fastlane Ventures. He was one of the main investors behind Singulariteam, a VC fund co-founded with Moshe Hogeg that invested in a number of companies operating in Internet and mobile technologies. Rakishev invested $20 million in a social media platform for sharing photos and videos called Mobli, which shut down in 2016. In 2013 or 2014 he co-founded a company, Sirin Labs, to make secure luxury smartphones, which cost at least US $14,000 each. In 2017 it announced plans for a smartphone that would involve blockchain technology.

In 2015, Rakishev bought Sedmoi Kanal (Channel Seven), a Kazakhstan national TV channel.

In February 2024, Rakishev announced the creation of a new venture capital firm, bYb Capital, aimed at boosting technology startups in Kazakhstan towards the rest of the world.

== Personal life ==
He is married to Aselle Tasmagambetova, daughter of Imangali Tasmagambetov.

In 2014, he paid $142,300 to buy a car that was either for Hunter Biden or a company associated with him. In 2015, he went with Kazakhstan's prime minister, Karim Massimov, to a group dinner with Hunter Biden and Joe Biden, who was vice president of the United States at the time. In 2023–2024, the United States House Oversight Committee investigation into the Biden family included questions about these activities.

Rakishev was vice-president of the Asian Boxing Confederation. From 2012 to 2016, he was the President of the Kazakhstan Judo Federation. From 2019 to 2024, he was the president of the Kazakhstan Boxing Federation.

== Awards ==
- Order of Kurmet (2015)
- Order of Parasat (2025)
