= Moshe Hogeg =

Israeli businessman (born 1981)

- משה חוגג
- Born: 15 May 1981 (age 45); Beersheba, Israel
- Occupation: Businessman

Moshe Hogeg (Hebrew: משה חוגג; born 15 May 1981) is an Israeli businessman.

== Early life ==
Hogeg was born on 15 May 1981, in Beersheba, and grew up in the nearby local council of Meitar. He identifies as an Arab Jew, his father was born in Tunisia and his mother in Morocco.

== Business ventures ==
In 2010, Hogeg founded Mobli, which reportedly attracted numerous celebrity investors including Carlos Slim, Serena Williams, and Leonardo DiCaprio. One investor was Kazakh businessman Kenges Rakishev; the two later founded a venture capital firm that became known as Singulariteam, which was one of the most active firms in Israel for a time. In April 2014, he co-founded Yo app, the app was valued at between $5 and $10 million in July 2014.

Hogeg became active in cryptocurrency, donating $1.9 million to Tel Aviv University for blockchain research and founding the Alignment Blockchain Hub. In 2017 and 2018, he led three initial coin offerings (ICOs) for his companies Sirin Labs, Stx Technologies Limited, and Leadcoin, raising over $250 million combined. In June 2018, Hogeg purchased an acre of land in Kfar Shmaryahu, a suburb of Tel Aviv, for 70 million shekels (US$19.3 million). He paid 15 percent of the purchase price in Bitcoin, believed to be the first real estate transaction in Israel conducted with the cryptocurrency.

Hogeg has invested as well in several ventures including, Moonactive, StoreDot and Delek Group.

Throughout his business career, Hogeg has faced lawsuits over his ventures from investors and former employees, including former members of Singulariteam. Most were settled out of court with plaintiffs signing nondisclosure agreements.

=== Tomi Cryptocurrency ===
In September 2022, Hogeg launched the Tomi cryptocurrency project. In an interview with a local newspaper in Marrakesh, he identified himself as the CEO of Tomi and stated that all the founders invested $10 million from their private capital. By 2024, the Tomi cryptocurrency lost nearly 97% from its peak value and market cap

=== Beitar Jerusalem F.C. ===
In 2021, Hogeg acquired Beitar Jerusalem F.C..

On 15 July 2021, Hogeg announced the cancellation of a planned match between Beitar and FC Barcelona, after Barcelona refused to hold the event in the city of Jerusalem. He said that he was "a proud Jew and Israeli" and could not "betray Jerusalem". In August 2022, he sold Beitar Jerusalem to Barak Abramov.

== Arrest, investigation and criminal charges ==
Hogeg was arrested in November 2021 over alleged sexual offenses and cryptocurrency-related fraud. He was subsequently released on a $22 million bail bond to house arrest. Following the arrest, Moshe's Ferrari was repossessed by the state of Israel and soon after publicly auctioned.

In July 2022, Hogeg was re-arrested by the Israeli police for failing to fulfill his court ordered bail bond requirement.

In August 2023, the Israeli National Fraud Investigations Unit (NAU) recommended to indict Hogeg for defrauding investors of $290 million.

Also in August 2023, Israeli police announced the closure of the sexual offense case against Hogeg, stating that the investigation did not yield sufficient evidence to justify an indictment.
