= Secretary General of the CSTO =

Diplomatic head of the CSTO

Secretary General of the Collective Security Treaty Organization
- Генеральный секретарь ОДКБ
- Logo of the CSTO

- Flag of the CSTO
- Incumbent; Taalatbek Masadykov since 1 January 2026
- CSTO
- Member of: CSTO Collective Security Council
- Seat: CSTO Secretariat, Moscow, Russia
- Appointer: CSTO Collective Security Council
- Term length: Three years, renewable
- Formation: October 1996; 30 years ago
- First holder: Vladimir Zemsky

The Secretary General of the CSTO is the chief civil servant of the Collective Security Treaty Organization (CSTO), responsible for coordinating the workings of the alliance. The officeholder is one of the foremost political officials in the organization. The secretary general is elected for a three-year term. The current secretary general is Kyrgyz politician Taalatbek Masadykov, who took office on 1 January 2026.

== History ==
The CSTO countries selected the first secretary general in October 1996. Since that time, eight different military/security officials have served officially as secretary general. Five countries have been represented, with five secretaries general hailing from Russia and one each from Armenia, Belarus, Kazakhstan, and Kyrgyzstan. The position has also been occupied temporarily on two occasions by an acting secretary general between appointments.

== Secretariat ==
The Secretariat has divisions in charge of legal, financial, economic and other issues. The number of quota posts in the Secretariat is assigned to the CSTO member states in proportion to their contributions to the budget. The appointment of officials to the quota positions of the Secretariat is carried out by the Secretary General on a rotational basis every three years on the proposal of the CSTO member states.

=== Leadership ===
- CSTO Secretary General: Taalatbek Masadykov (Kyrgyzstan)
- Deputy Secretary General
  - Valery Semerikov (Russian Federation)
  - Samat Ordabaev (Kazakhstan)
  - Mirlan Turgunbekov (Kyrgyzstan)

=== Structure ===
The CSTO Secretariat includes the following main structural units:

- Department of Political Cooperation
- Department for the Management of Military Security Problems
- Department for Countering Challenges and Threats
- Case Management Department
- Organizational and Planning Department

== List of secretaries-general ==
The following have served as heads of the CSTO:

No.	Portrait	Name (born–died)	Term of office			Country	Ref.
No.	Portrait	Name (born–died)	Took office	Left office	Time in office	Country	Ref.
1		Vladimir Zemsky (1939–2004)	October 1996	March 2000	3 years, 5 months	Russia	
2		Valeriy Nikolayenko (born ?)	May 2000	28 April 2003	2 years, 11 months	Russia	
2		Nikolay Bordyuzha (born 1949)	28 April 2003	31 December 2016	13 years, 247 days	Russia	
–		Valery Semerikov (born 1954) acting	1 January 2017	2 May 2017	121 days	Russia	
3		Yuri Khatchaturov (born 1952)	2 May 2017	1 November 2018	1 year, 183 days	Armenia	
–		Valery Semerikov (born 1954) acting	1 November 2018	31 December 2019	1 year, 60 days	Russia	
3		Stanislav Zas (born 1964)	1 January 2020	31 December 2022	2 years, 364 days	Belarus	
4		Imangali Tasmagambetov (born 1956)	1 January 2023	31 December 2025	2 years, 364 days	Kazakhstan	
5		Taalatbek Masadykov (born 1961)	1 January 2026	Incumbent	297 days	Kyrgyzstan	

== See also ==
- Secretary General of NATO – North Atlantic Treaty Organization (NATO) equivalent
