= Order of Glory and Honor =

The award badge.

The Order of Glory and Honor (Russian: Орден Славы и чести) is the third most senior order of the Russian Orthodox Church. The order was established on March 23, 2004 by the decision of Patriarch Alexy II of Moscow and the Holy Synod of the Russian Orthodox Church.

The order is awarded to heads of state and government, leaders of international and intergovernmental organizations, heads of churches and denominations, and outstanding government and public figures for significant contributions to interchurch and interreligious cooperation and to strengthening peace and friendship among peoples.

== Recipients ==
- Mahmoud Abbas (2015)
- Sergey Lavrov (2020)
- Viktor Orbán (2023)
- Nikita Mikhalkov (2025)
