= Stanislav Zas =

Belarusian general and politician (born 1964)

Lieutenant General Stanislav Zas
- Станіслаў Зась
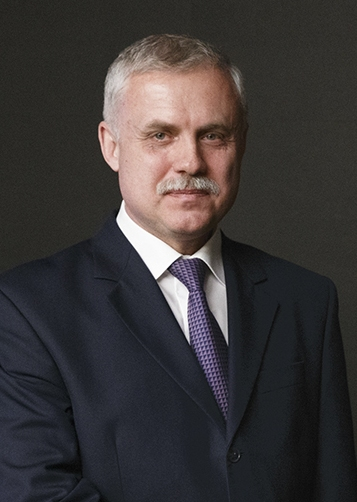
- Zas in 2020

7th Secretary General of the CSTO
- In office 1 January 2020 – 23 November 2022
- Preceded by: Yuri Khatchaturov; Valery Semerikov (acting)
- Succeeded by: Imangali Tasmagambetov

Personal details
- Born: 1964 (age 61–62) Chernihiv Oblast, Ukrainian SSR, Soviet Union

Military service
- Allegiance: USSR; Belarus
- Years of service: 1985–present
- Rank: Lieutenant General

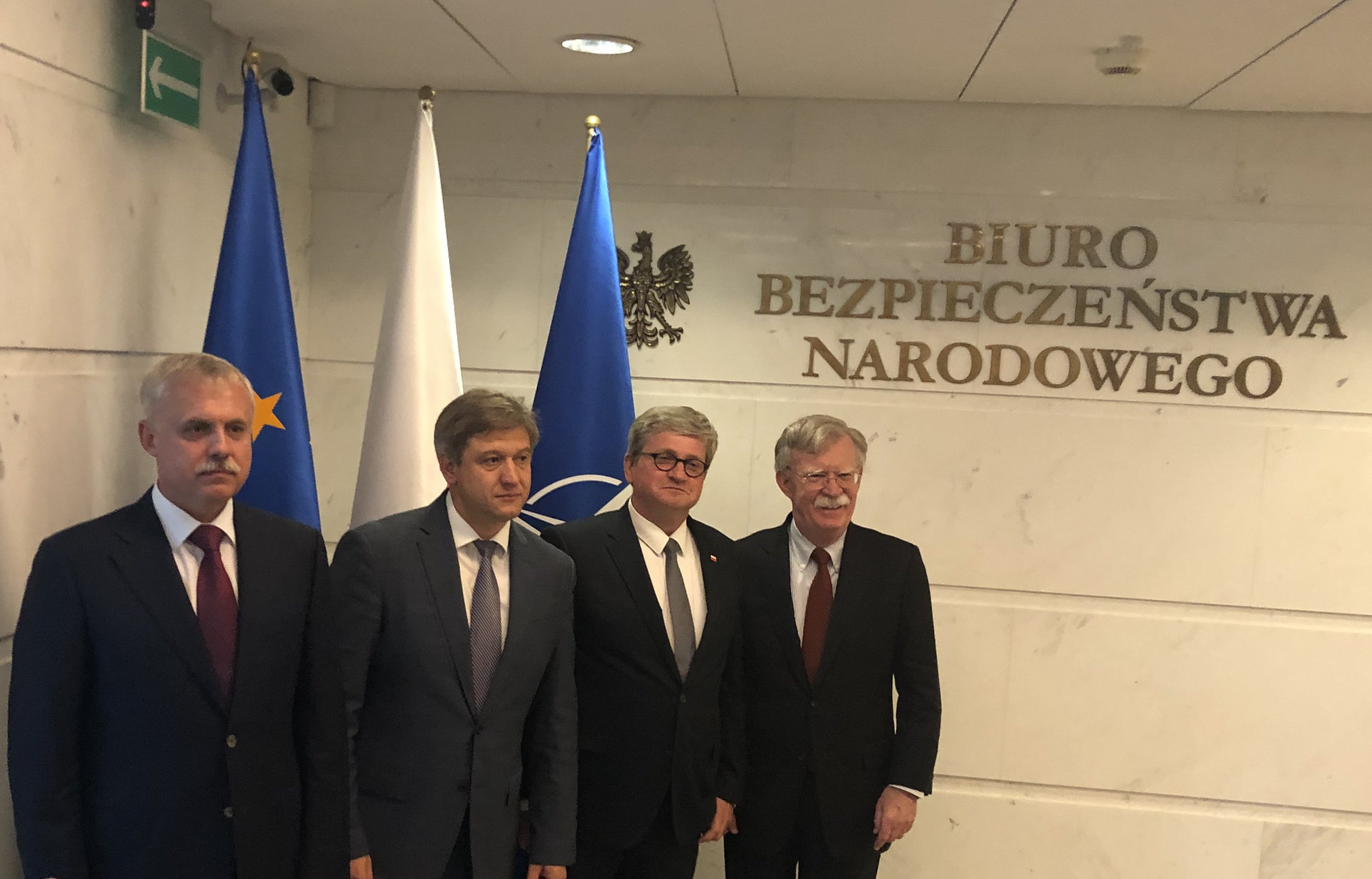
Zas with John Bolton (far right), Paweł Soloch (center right), and Oleksandr Danylyuk (center left) in Warsaw.

Lieutenant General Stanislav Vasilievich Zas (Belarusian: Станісла́ў Васі́левіч Зась, Russian: Станислав Васильевич Зась; born 1964) is a Belarusian general and politician who is a former Secretary-General of the Collective Security Treaty Organization and was formerly the State Secretary of the Security Council of Belarus.

== Early life ==
Zas was born in 1964 in Chernihiv, Ukrainian Soviet Socialist Republic. From 1982–1985, Zas was enrolled in the Baku Higher Combined Arms Command School in the capital of the Azerbaijan SSR.

== Career ==
After graduating from the Azerbaijani command school at the age of 21, he began his service in the Soviet Army, at one point acting as a commander of a motorized rifle platoon and reconnaissance platoon. For two years beginning in 1993, he was selected to study at the Combined Arms Academy of the Armed Forces of the Russian Federation, and completed his studies at age 32 in 1996 at the Military Academy of Belarus with honors and a gold medal. Zas quickly rose in the military hierarchy, serving in various positions such as head of the Main Operational Department of the General Staff of the Armed Forces of Belarus. Zas was promoted to Deputy State Secretary in August 2008. On 4 November 2015 he replaced Alexander Mezhuyev as State Secretary of the Security Council of Belarus, in accordance with a decree by President Alexander Lukashenko dating back to July of that year.

=== Secretary-General of CSTO ===
In December 2018 Lieutenant-General Zas was made a candidate for the post of Secretary General of the Collective Security Treaty Organization, succeeding Colonel-General Yuri Khachaturov from Armenia.

In May 2019, the CSTO's Foreign Ministers nominated Zas to become Secretary General, with his official appointment being on 1 January 2020.

It was under his watch that the CSTO deployed active duty troops for the first time in its 20-year history in January 2022, to quell an incipient rebellion in Kazakhstan. This commitment of peacekeeping forces was mentioned by Zas in his Statement by the CSTO Secretary General to the UN Security Council on 16 February.

Zas reaffirmed the CSTO goal of "resolution of world problems by exclusively political and diplomatic means in accordance with the provisions and goals of the UN Charter" as recently as 16 February in communication with the UN Security Council.

On 17 February 2022 Zas held an interview, his first with the Western media, in the CSTO's Moscow headquarters. He offered that the CSTO might in theory deploy some of its forces to the Donbas and that the CSTO was able to marshal a significant force if necessary. "Hypothetically you can imagine it (such a deployment) if there were goodwill from Ukraine – it is after all their territory – if there was a UN Security Council mandate, and if it was needed and such a decision was supported by all our governments." Zas opined that the only way to resolve the Russo-Ukrainian war was through negotiations.
