= Taalatbek Masadykov =

Kyrgyz politician

- Таалатбек Масадыков

5th Secretary General of the CSTO
- Incumbent
- Assumed office 1 January 2026
- Preceded by: Imangali Tasmagambetov

Deputy Secretary General of CSTO
- In office January 2024 – 31 December 2025

Deputy Chairman of the Security Council of Kyrgyzstan
- In office July 2021 – April 2022
- President: Sadyr Japarov

Personal details
- Born: 22 January 1961 (age 65) Bishkek, Kyrgyz SSR, Soviet Union
- Party: Independent

Taalatbek Shamudinovich Masadykov (Kyrgyz: Таалатбек Шамудинович Масадыков; born 22 January 1961) is a Kyrgyz politician who is currently serving as the Secretary General of the Collective Security Treaty Organisation since 1 January 2026.

== Early career ==
Taalatbek Masadykov was born in Bishkek on 22 January 1961. In 1984, Masadykov graduated from the Moscow State Institute of International Relations, received an international relations diploma.

From 1988 to 1991, he studied full-time postgraduate studies at the Institute of Asian and African Countries at the Lomonosov Moscow State University, Department of Iranian Philology and defended his PhD thesis on Afghan literature (he holds a PhD in Philology). From 2000 to 2002, he studied full-time doctoral studies at the London School of Economics and Political Science.

From 1987 to 1988, he worked in a group of Soviet advisors to the Academy of Sciences and the Ministry of Tribal and Frontier Affairs of Afghanistan.

From 1995 to 1996, Masadykov was a member of the Government of Kyrgyzstan, working as the Deputy General Director of the State Committee on Foreign Investment and Economic Assistance, and from 1997 to 1998, working as Co-Dean and Lecturer of the International Relations Department of the American University in Kyrgyzstan.

== United Nations career ==
Masadykov worked in the United Nations system for more than 12 years, from June 2002 to November 2014. In June 2002, he started working as a Political Advisor to the UN Assistance Mission in Afghanistan (UNAMA). Later, he worked as the Head of UNAMA Regional Offices in the south-eastern and southern regions of Afghanistan and then was UNAMA's Chief Political Advisor. At some point, he worked as Political Director of the UN Special Political Mission in Afghanistan.

In 2016, he served as a visiting professor at University of Tokyo in Tokyo, Japan, delivering a series of lectures on the peace process in Afghanistan and security threats to the region around Afghanistan.

He worked as an expert on international relations, regional and international security and engaged in research and analysis for independent think tanks; he provided advice to governmental and non-governmental organizations.

== Kyrgyz political career ==
In 2017, Masadykov ran for the presidency in the 2017 Kyrgyz presidential election as an Independent, but lost.

In July 2021, Masadykov was appointed Deputy Chairman of the Security Council of Kyrgyzstan. From April 2022 to December 2023, he worked as Special Representative of the President of Kyrgyzstan on special assignments. In January 2024, he was appointed the CSTO Deputy Secretary General.

== CSTO ==
He had been the Deputy Secretary General of CSTO under Kazakh Secretary General Imangali Tasmagambetov, until 31 December 2025, in which he was sworn into office the next day. At the summit, President of Belarus Alexander Lukashenko endorsed Masadykov, and is "ready for close and constructive cooperation".

== Personal life ==
Masadykov can speak Kyrgyz, Russian, English, Pashto, and Dari.
