= Collective Security Treaty Organization =

Intergovernmental military alliance

- Организация Договора о коллективной безопасности (Russian)
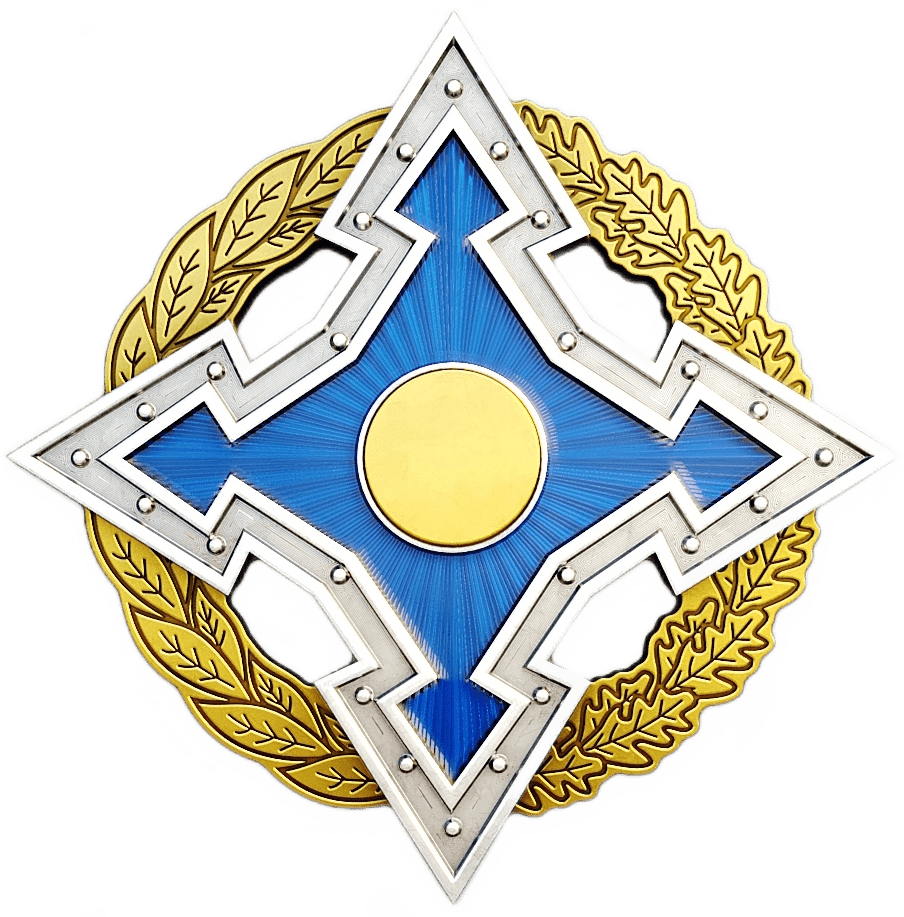
- Emblem

- Flag

- Member states; Territory occupied by member states; Observer states; States with suspended membership
- Abbreviation: CSTO, ОДКБ (ODKB)
- Formation: 14 February 1992 (as the Unified Armed Forces); 15 May 1992 (as Collective Security Treaty); 7 October 2002 (as Collective Security Treaty Organization)
- Type: Military alliance
- Headquarters: Moscow, Russia
- Location: Eurasia
- Region served: Eastern Europe, Caucasus, Central Asia, Northern Asia
- Members: Armenia (suspended) (Note: Armenia de facto "froze" its CSTO membership in February 2024. Armenia's voting rights were suspended on 11 November 2026.); Belarus; Kazakhstan; Kyrgyzstan; Russia; Tajikistan
- Official language: Russian
- Secretary General: Taalatbek Masadykov
- Chief of the Joint Staff: Andrey Serdyukov
- Website: odkb-csto.org

The Collective Security Treaty Organization (CSTO; Russian: Организация Договора о коллективной безопасности (ОДКБ), romanized: Organizatsiya dogovora o kollektivnoy bezopasnosti, ODKB) is an intergovernmental military alliance in Eurasia consisting of six post-Soviet states: Armenia, Belarus, Kazakhstan, Kyrgyzstan, Russia, and Tajikistan. The Collective Security Treaty has its origins in the Soviet Armed Forces, which was replaced in 1992 by the United Armed Forces of the Commonwealth of Independent States, and was then itself replaced by the successor armed forces of the respective independent states. Former members of the CSTO military alliance were Azerbaijan, Georgia, and Uzbekistan.

Similar to Article 5 of the North Atlantic Treaty and the Inter-American Treaty of Reciprocal Assistance, Article 4 of the Collective Security Treaty (CST) establishes that an aggression against one signatory would be perceived as an aggression against all. The 2002 CSTO charter reaffirmed the desire of all participating states to abstain from the use or threat of force. Signatories are prohibited from joining other military alliances.

== Activities ==
=== Military exercises ===
The CSTO holds yearly military command exercises for the CSTO nations to have an opportunity to improve inter-organizational cooperation. The largest of such exercises was held in Southern Russia and central Asia in 2011, consisting of more than 10,000 troops and 70 combat aircraft.

=== Operational procedures ===
Similar to NATO, the CSTO maintains a Parliamentary Assembly. CSTO employs a "rotating presidency" system in which the country leading the CSTO alternates every year. To deploy military bases of a third country in the territory of the CSTO member-states, it is necessary to obtain the official consent of all its members.

=== Peacekeeping force ===
The Collective Security Treaty Organization (CSTO) maintains a peacekeeping force that has been deployed to areas of conflict, including Tajikistan and Kyrgyzstan. The force is composed of troops from member states and is designed to provide stability and security in the region.

On 6 October 2007, CSTO members agreed to a major expansion of the organization that would create a CSTO peacekeeping force that could deploy under a United Nations mandate or without one in its member states. The expansion would also allow all members to purchase Russian weapons at the same price as Russia.

In January 2022, the CSTO deployed 2,000 of its peacekeepers to Kazakhstan to quell the local unrest.

=== Collective Rapid Reaction Force ===
On 4 February 2009, an agreement to create the Collective Rapid Reaction Force (KSOR) (Russian: Коллекти́вные си́лы операти́вного реаги́рования (КСОР)) was reached by five of the seven members, with plans finalized on 14 June. The force is intended to be used to repulse military aggression, conduct anti-terrorist operations, fight transnational crime and drug trafficking, and neutralize the effects of natural disasters.

Belarus and Uzbekistan initially refrained from signing on to the agreement. Belarus did so because of a trade dispute with Russia, and Uzbekistan due to general concerns. Belarus signed the agreement the following October, while Uzbekistan has never done so. A source in the Russian delegation said Uzbekistan would not participate in the collective force permanently but would "delegate" its detachments to take part in operations on an ad hoc basis.

On 3 August 2009, the Ministry of Foreign Affairs of Uzbekistan criticized plans by Russia to establish a military base in southern Kyrgyzstan for the CSTO rapid reaction force, stating,

The implementation of such projects on complex and unpredictable territory, where the borders of three Central Asian republics directly converge, may give impetus to the strengthening of militarization processes and initiate all kinds of nationalistic confrontations. [...] Also, it could lead to the appearance of radical extremist forces that could lead to serious destabilization in this vast region.

== History ==
=== Foundation ===
A clickable Euler diagram showing the relationships among various supranational organisations in the territory of the former Soviet Union

On 15 May 1992, six post-Soviet states belonging to the Commonwealth of Independent States — Russia, Armenia, Kazakhstan, Kyrgyzstan, Tajikistan, and Uzbekistan—signed the Collective Security Treaty (also referred to as the Tashkent Pact or Tashkent Treaty). Three other post-Soviet states—Azerbaijan, Belarus, and Georgia—acceded in 1993, and the treaty took effect in 1994. The CST was set to last for 5 years unless extended. On 2 April 1999, six of the nine—all but Azerbaijan, Georgia, and Uzbekistan—agreed to renew the treaty for five more years. At the same time, Uzbekistan joined the GUAM group, established in 1997 by Georgia, Ukraine, Azerbaijan, and Moldova, and largely seen as intending to counter Russian influence in the region.

The CSTO was founded in 2002 when the six member states agreed to create the Collective Security Treaty Organization as a military alliance. As an attempt to develop a successor alliance to the Warsaw Pact, the CSTO is comparatively weak.

=== 2003 to 2012 ===
In 2004, the CSTO was granted Observer status in the UN General Assembly. During 2005, the CSTO partners conducted some common military exercises.

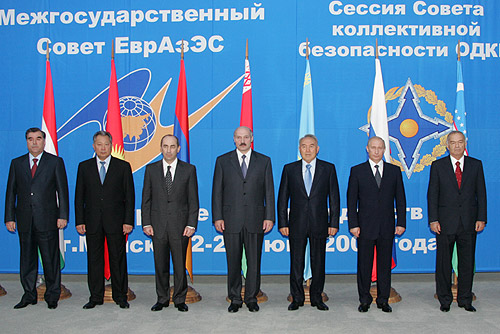
CSTO and EAEC leaders in 2006

Uzbekistan withdrew from GUAM in 2005 and joined the CSTO in 2006 as a full member, and its membership was later ratified by the Uzbek parliament on 28 March 2008.

In October 2007, the CSTO signed an agreement with the Shanghai Cooperation Organisation (SCO), in the Tajik capital of Dushanbe, to broaden cooperation on issues such as security, crime, and drug trafficking. On 6 October 2007, CSTO members agreed to a major expansion of the organization that would create a CSTO peacekeeping force that could deploy under a U.N. mandate or without one in its member states. The expansion would also allow all members to purchase Russian weapons at the same price as Russia.

On 29 August 2008, Russia announced it would seek CSTO recognition of the independence of Abkhazia and South Ossetia. Three days earlier, on 26 August, Russia recognized the independence of Georgia's breakaway regions of Abkhazia and South Ossetia.

In 2009, Belarus boycotted the CSTO summit due to its Milk War with Russia. After refusing to attend a CSTO summit in 2009, Lukashenko said: "Why should my men fight in Kazakhstan? Mothers would ask me why I sent their sons to fight so far from Belarus. For what? For a unified energy market? That is not what lives depend on. No!"

After Kurmanbek Bakiyev was ousted from office as President of Kyrgyzstan as a result of riots in Kyrgyzstan in April 2010, he was granted asylum in Belarus. Belarusian President Alexander Lukashenko expressed doubt about the future of the CSTO for failing to prevent Bakiyev's overthrow, stating: "What sort of organization is this one, if there is bloodshed in one of our member states and an anticonstitutional coup d'état takes place, and this body keeps silent?"

Lukashenko had previously accused Russia of punishing Belarus with economic sanctions after Lukashenko refused to recognize the independence of Abkhazia and South Ossetia, stating: "The economy serves as the basis for our common security. But if Belarus's closest CSTO ally is trying ... to destroy this basis and de facto put the Belarusians on their knees, how can one talk about consolidating collective security in the CSTO space?"

During a trip to Ukraine to extend Russia's lease of the Crimean port Sevastopol in return for discounted natural gas supplies, Russian President Dmitry Medvedev was asked about whether Belarus could expect a similar deal and responded: "Real partnership is one thing and a declaration of intentions is another; reaching agreement on working seriously, meeting each other halfway, helping each other is one thing and making decisions about granting permanent residence to people who have lost their job is another." The Belarusian President defended himself against this criticism by citing former Russian President Vladimir Putin's invitation of Askar Akayev to Russia after he was ousted as President of Kyrgyzstan during the 2005 Tulip Revolution.

The following month, President Medvedev ordered the CEO of Russia's natural gas monopoly Gazprom to cut gas supplies to Belarus in a dispute over outstanding debts. Subsequently, the Russian television channel NTV, run by Gazprom, aired a documentary film which compared Lukashenko to Bakiyev. Then the Russian President's foreign policy adviser Sergei Prikhodko threatened to publish the transcript of a CSTO meeting where Lukashenko said that his administration would recognize Abkhazian and South Ossetian independence.

In June 2010, ethnic clashes broke out between ethnic Kyrgyz and Uzbeks in southern Kyrgyzstan, leading interim Kyrgyz President Roza Otunbayeva to request the assistance of Russian troops to quell the disturbances. Kurmanbek Bakiyev denied charges that his supporters were behind the ethnic conflict and called on the CSTO to intervene. Askar Akayev also called for the CSTO to send troops, saying: "Our priority task right now should be to extinguish this flame of enmity. We will likely need CSTO peacekeepers to do that." The organization was considered by some a "paper tiger" since it failed to intervene.

Russian President Dmitry Medvedev said that "only in the case of a foreign intrusion and an attempt to externally seize power can we state that there is an attack against the CSTO", and that, "all the problems of Kyrgyzstan have internal roots", while CSTO Secretary General Nikolai Bordyuzha called the violence "purely a domestic affair". Later, however, Bordyuzha admitted that the CSTO response may have been inadequate and claimed that "foreign mercenaries" provoked the Kyrgyz violence against ethnic Uzbek minorities.

On 21 July 2010, interim Kyrgyz President Roza Otunbayeva called for the introduction of CSTO police units to southern Kyrgyzstan, saying: "I think it's important to introduce CSTO police forces there, since we're unable to guarantee people's rights on our own." She also added: "I'm not seeking the CSTO's embrace and I don't feel like bringing them here to stay, but the bloodletting there will continue otherwise." Only weeks later, the deputy chairman of Otubayeva's interim Kyrgyz government complained that their appeals for help from the CSTO had been ignored. The CSTO was unable to agree on providing military assistance to Kyrgyzstan at a meeting in Yerevan, Armenia, which was attended by Roza Otunbayeva as well as Alexander Lukashenko.

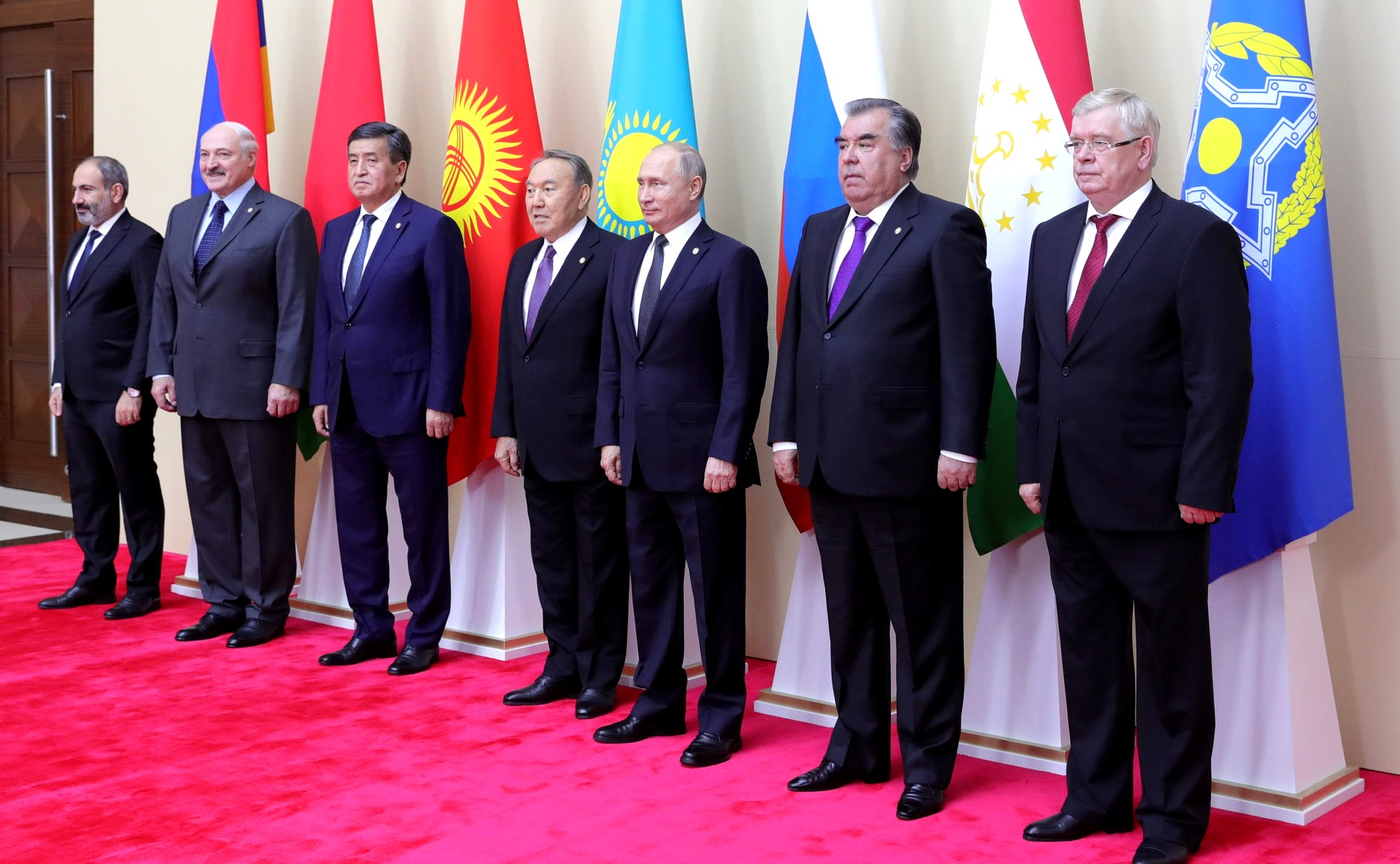
The CSTO meeting in Astana, Kazakhstan, 8 November 2018

On 10 December 2010, the member states approved a declaration establishing a CSTO peacekeeping force and a declaration of the CSTO member states, in addition to signing a package of joint documents.

Since 21 December 2011, the Treaty parties can veto the establishment of new foreign military bases in the member states of the Collective Security Treaty Organization (CSTO).

On 28 June 2012, Uzbekistan submitted a notification to the CSTO to suspend its membership. In December 2012, the CSTO Collective Security Council decided to suspend Uzbekistan.

=== 2013 to 2022 ===
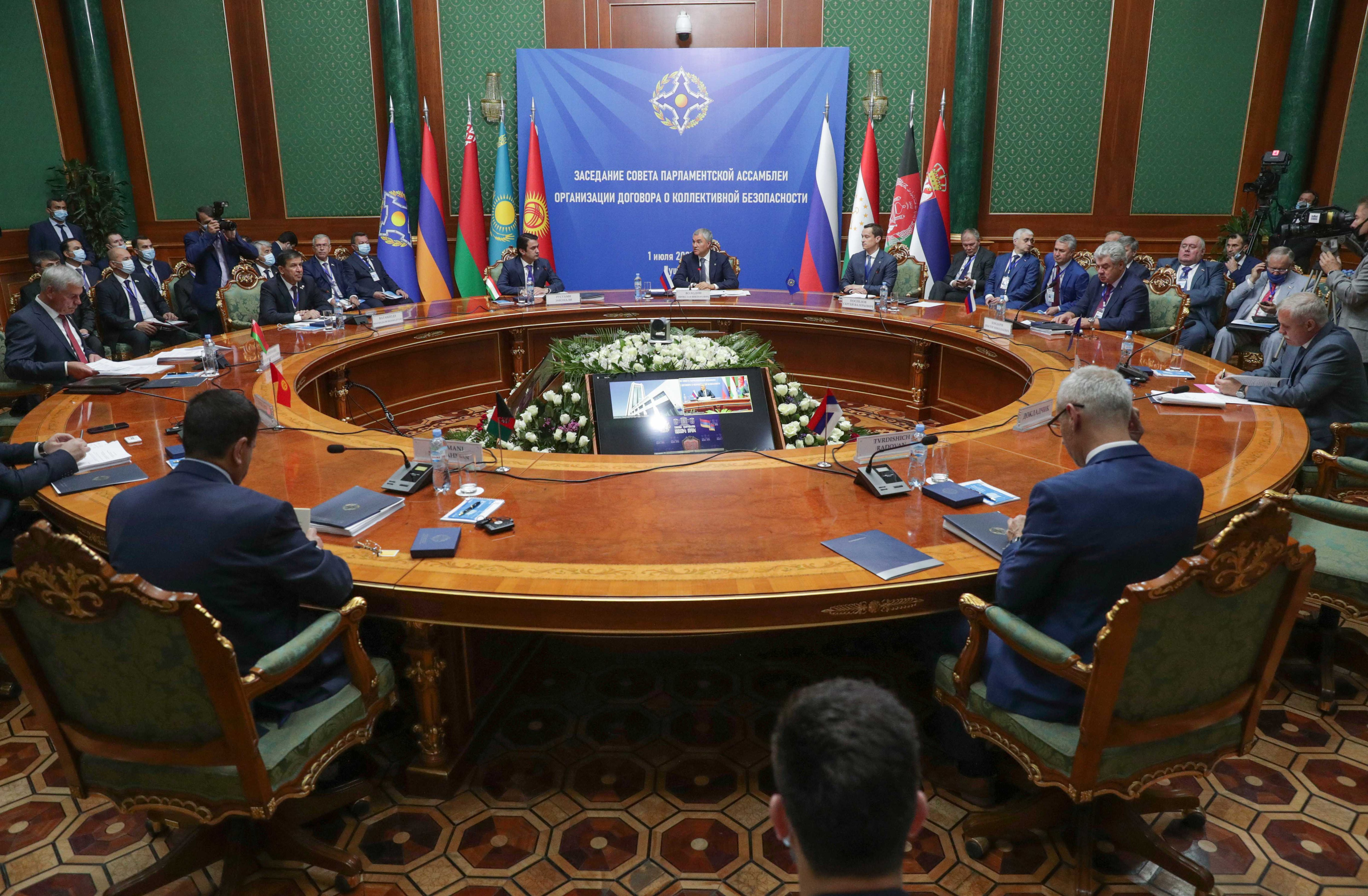
CSTO Summit 2021

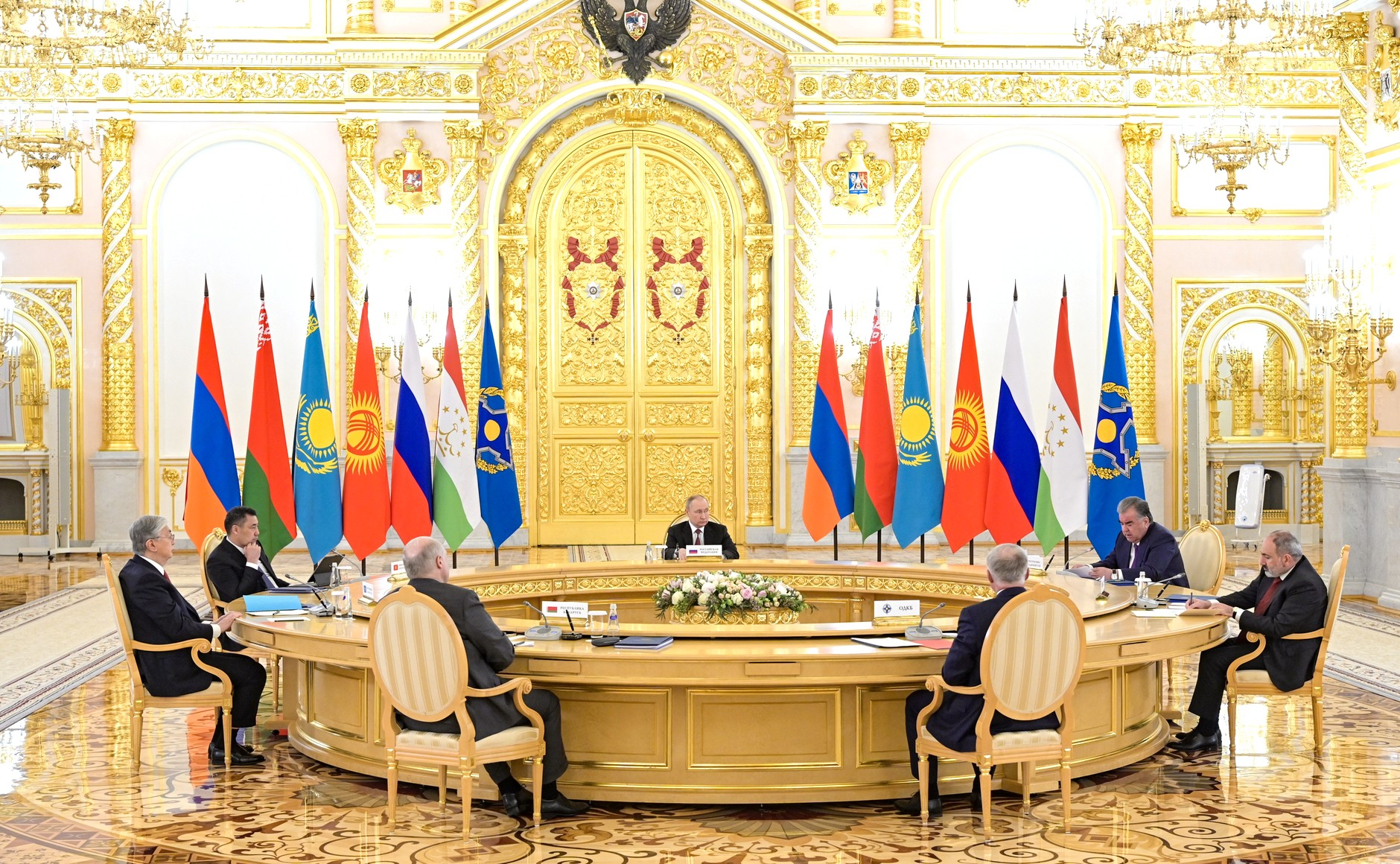
CSTO Summit 2022

In August 2014, 3,000 soldiers from the members of Armenia, Belarus, Kazakhstan, Kyrgyzstan, Russia and Tajikistan participated in psychological and cyber warfare exercises in Kazakhstan under war games managed by CSTO.

On 19 March 2015, the CSTO Secretary General Nikolai Bordyuzha offered to send a peacekeeping mission to Donbas, Ukraine. "The CSTO has a peacekeeping capacity. Our peacekeepers continuously undergo corresponding training. If such a decision is taken by the United Nations, we stand ready to provide peacekeeping units".

In July 2021, CSTO Secretary-General Stanislav Zas was criticized by Armenian politicians for calling an incursion by Azerbaijani forces onto Armenian territory a "border incident", where the CSTO remained inactive during the conflict.

In July 2021, Tajikistan appealed to members of CSTO for help in dealing with security challenges emerging from neighboring Afghanistan. Thousands of Afghans, including police and government troops, fled to Tajikistan after Taliban insurgents took control of many parts of Afghanistan.

On 5 January 2022, CSTO peacekeepers were announced to be deployed to Kazakhstan in response to anti-government unrest in the country. On 11 January the same year, CSTO forces began their withdrawal from Kazakhstan. Since the start of the Russian invasion of Ukraine in February 2022, there has been no CSTO involvement or official participation of other CSTO members in the conflict, apart from Belarus, which agreed to house Russian troops, which then attacked Ukraine from across its border. Following the 2023 Ukrainian counteroffensive, the border between Ukraine and Belarus was cleared of Russian forces.

=== 2023 to present ===
Relations between Russia and Kazakhstan have become more complicated and somewhat more distant since the Russia's invasion of Ukraine. The latter has refused to recognize the Donetsk and the Luhansk People's Republics, but they have not broken down. As of October 2026, Kazakhstan is still maintaining substantial cooperation with Russia while deliberately keeping some distance from Moscow's position on Ukraine.

After the start of renewed fighting between Armenia and former member Azerbaijan on 13 September 2022, Armenia triggered Article 4 of the treaty, and a CSTO mission including CSTO Secretary General Stanislav Zas and Anatoly Sidorov was sent to monitor the situation along the border. Similar events also took place near the Kyrgyzstan–Tajikistan border throughout 2022.

After the CSTO mission took a rather uncommitted position in the conflict, criticism towards CSTO membership inside Armenian political circles increased, with the secretary of the Security Council of Armenia, Armen Grigoryan, even stating that he saw no more hope for the CSTO. The lack of Russian support during the conflict prompted a national debate in Armenia, as an increasing percentage of the population indicated doubt as to whether it is beneficial to continue CSTO membership, calling for realignment of the state with NATO instead. This coincided with a visit from Speaker of the United States House of Representatives Nancy Pelosi to Yerevan on 17 September 2022, largely seen as an effort to reorient the security alliance structure of Armenia.

To discuss the results of the CSTO mission sent on 15 September 2022, an extraordinary session of the CSTO was held via videoconference on 28 October 2022. With the leaders of all member states and CSTO Secretary General Stanislav Zas in attendance, the meeting was chaired by Armenian Prime Minister Nikol Pashinyan, who concurred with the report presented by the Secretary General while also reiterating the importance for a clear political assessment of Azerbaijani aggression and a roadmap for the restoration of Armenian territorial integrity.

A regular Collective Security Council meeting took place on 23 November 2022, with the leaders of all CSTO members present to discuss matters of international and regional security. After Pashinyan refused to sign the joint declaration because it did not "reach a decision on a CSTO response to Azerbaijan's aggression against Armenia", speculation arose regarding the continuation of the CSTO. Secretary General Stanislas Zas indicated that, though numerous measures in the diplomatic as well as military spheres were generally agreed upon, no consensus regarding the situation on the border could be reached. On the occasion of the meeting and in the midst of the 2022 Russian invasion of Ukraine, Belarusian President Alexander Lukashenko stated that many in their countries had started to discuss the possibility that the CSTO may cease to exist if Russia loses its war in Ukraine. He later expanded on his opinion on the matter, stating that the CSTO will continue and nobody will fall, if there is unity. Meanwhile, during the meeting in Yerevan, large groups of protestors gathered and called for the withdrawal of Armenia from the CSTO and for the country to develop closer relations with the United States and the West. In the aftermath of the meeting, the US think tank The National Interest released an analysis on the current state of the CSTO, concluding that, while the alliance is in a fragile state, only few other nations could fill the void created by a possible Russian exit and step in as a power broker in the region. Economic dependencies between the member states have also increased since the start of the invasion and would dissuade the alliance from splitting up.

The diplomatic friction continued into January 2023, after Pashinyan refused to hold common military drills, because the organization did not unequivocally condemn Azerbaijan over its perceived aggression. In response, Dmitry Peskov, the Press Secretary of the President of Russia, stated that Armenia remains a very close ally and promised to continue the dialogue. To mend their ties, Sergey Lavrov offered the deployment of a CSTO mission along the Armenia-Azerbaijan border on 2 February 2023 within one or two days, "if our Armenian allies, friends are still interested in it like before".

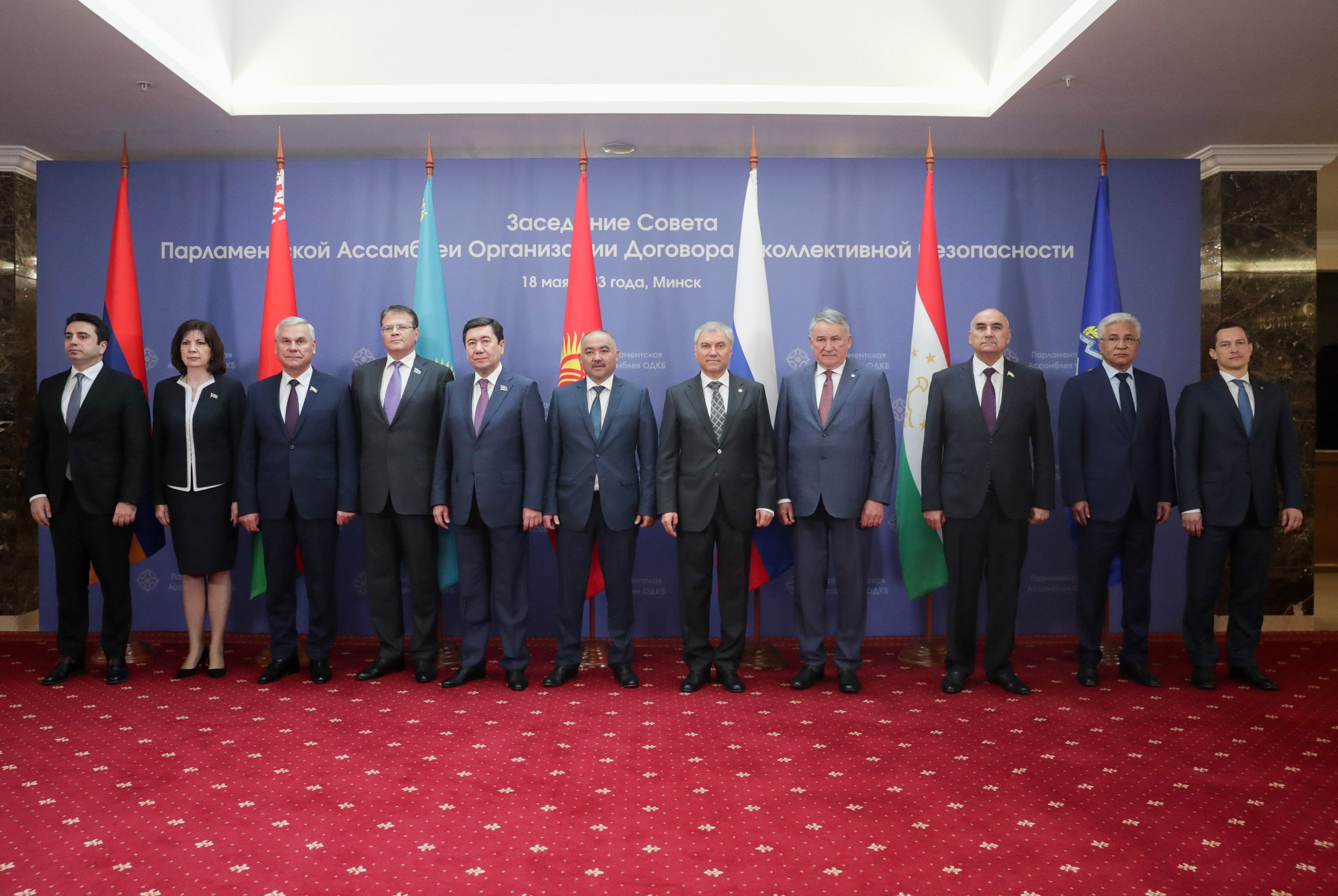
Meeting of the Council of the Parliamentary Assembly of the Collective Security Treaty Organization in Minsk (May 2023)

In May 2023, after the conflict between Armenia and Azerbaijan escalated, the Armenian Prime Minister Nikol Pashinyan said that Armenia could consider withdrawing from the treaty due to the lack of support from Russia in the conflict. In an interview with CNN broadcast on 1 June 2023, Pashinyan stated that "Armenia is not an ally of Russia in the war in Ukraine".

On 3 September 2023, during an interview, Armenian Prime Minister Nikol Pashinyan stated that it was a strategic mistake for Armenia to solely rely on Russia to guarantee its security. Pashinyan stated, "Moscow has been unable to deliver and is in the process of winding down its role in the wider South Caucasus region," and "the Russian Federation cannot meet Armenia's security needs. This example should demonstrate to us that dependence on just one partner in security matters is a strategic mistake." Pashinyan accused Russian peacekeepers deployed to uphold the ceasefire deal of failing to do their job. Pashinyan confirmed that Armenia was trying to diversify its security arrangements, most notably with the European Union and the United States.

During the September 2023 Armenian protests that began following the 2023 Azerbaijani offensive in Nagorno-Karabakh, demonstrators surrounded the Russian embassy in Yerevan, criticizing Russia's refusal to intervene in the offensive. Some protesters called for the rejection of the Alma-Ata Protocol, and Armenia's withdrawal from the CSTO.

Armenia declined participating in military exercises at the CIS summit in Kyrgyzstan in October 2023 and asked for Russian peacekeeping forces to return to Russia. The Prime Minister of Armenia, Nikol Pashinyan, went further in late October saying he saw "no advantage" in the presence of Russian troops in Armenia. as of October 2023, approximately 10,000 Russian troops were stationed in Gyumri.

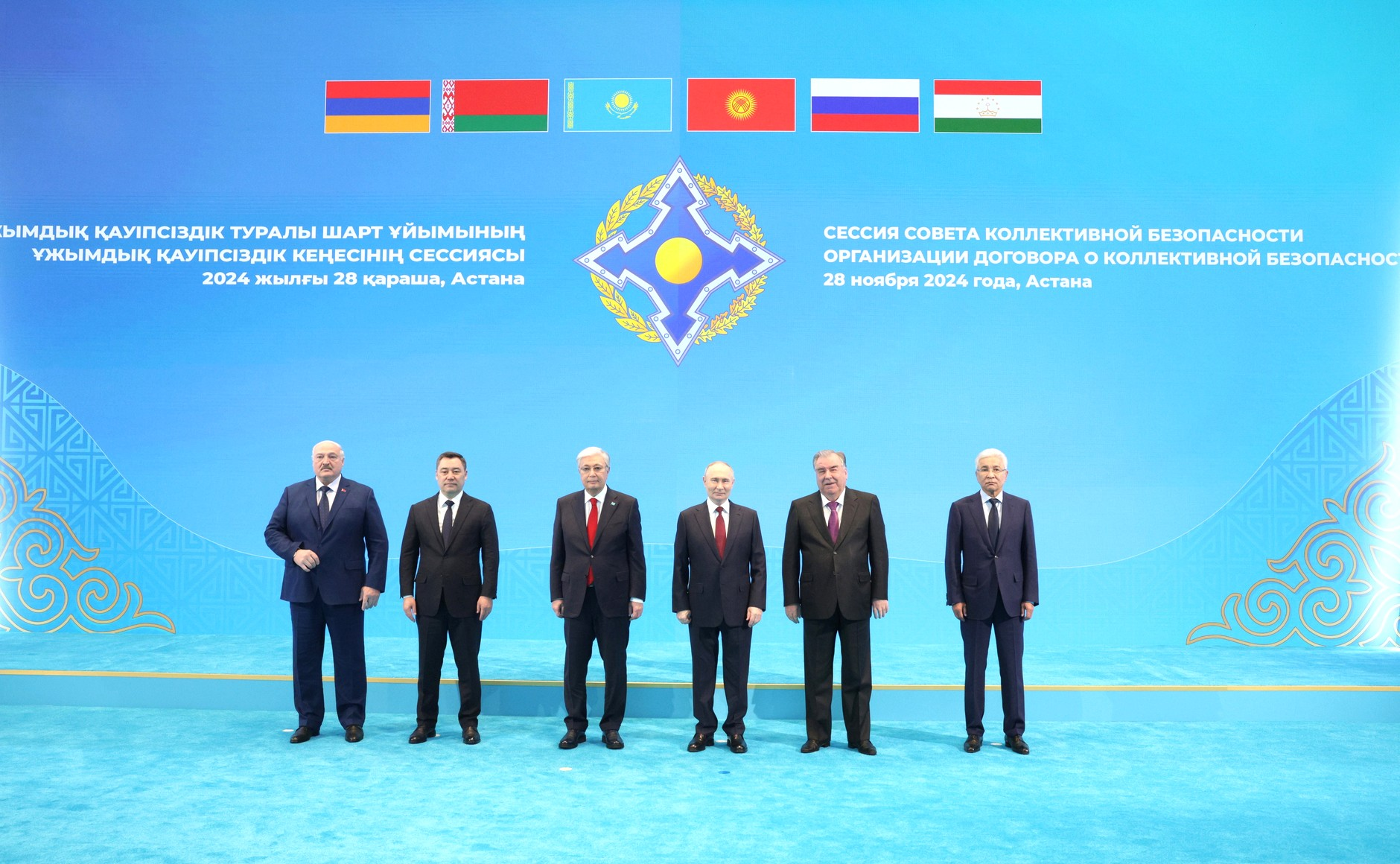
2024 CSTO Summit in Astana

On 23 February 2024, Armenian Prime Minister Nikol Pashinyan confirmed that Armenia had frozen its participation in the CSTO. Pashinyan stated, "We have now in practical terms frozen our participation in this treaty" and "membership of the CSTO was under review" during a live broadcast interview. On 28 February 2024, during a speech made in the National Assembly, Pashinyan further stated that the CSTO is "a threat to the national security of Armenia". Responding to Pashinyan's remarks, Dmitri Peskov stated that the CSTO charter does not include provisions for a "frozen membership" status. On 12 March, Pashinyan said that the CSTO needed to clarify "what constitutes Armenia's sovereign territory", as the organization had not come to Armenia's defence when requested following Azerbaijani troops crossing the border into Armenia's internationally recognized territory. Pashinyan said that if the CSTO's response did not align with Armenia's expectations, the country would officially withdraw from the organization. On 8 May 2024, Armenia announced it had stopped making financial contributions to the CSTO, leading Russia to state that it was still obligated to pay its membership dues. On 12 June 2024, Armenia announced that it would formally withdraw from the alliance at an unspecified later date, with Pashinyan stating, "We will leave. We will decide when to exit...Don't worry, we won't return".

A July 2024 Gallup opinion poll noted a 7% increase in support for Armenia's membership in NATO, with 29% of respondents believing Armenia should strive for NATO membership. Meanwhile, support for Armenia's membership in the CSTO decreased by 10%, with only 16.9% believing Armenia should maintain its membership in the CSTO.

On 6 August 2024, the Ukrainian Armed Forces launched an incursion into Russia's Kursk Oblast and clashed with the Russian Armed Forces and Russian border guard. On 17 August 2024, it was reported that CSTO countries have neither supported nor condemned the Ukrainian invasion of Russia. On 4 December 2024, during parliamentary discussions in the National Assembly, Armenian Prime Minister Nikol Pashinyan stated that "we already consider ourselves outside the CSTO" and "I believe we have crossed the point of no return" regarding Armenia's membership status in the CSTO.

On 11 November 2026, during a CSTO summit in Moscow the other CSTO members agreed to suspend Armenia's voting rights and its right to appoint representatives to key positions within CSTO. The stated reason for the suspension was Armenia's failure to fulfill membership obligations for the last few years.

== Membership ==
=== Member states ===
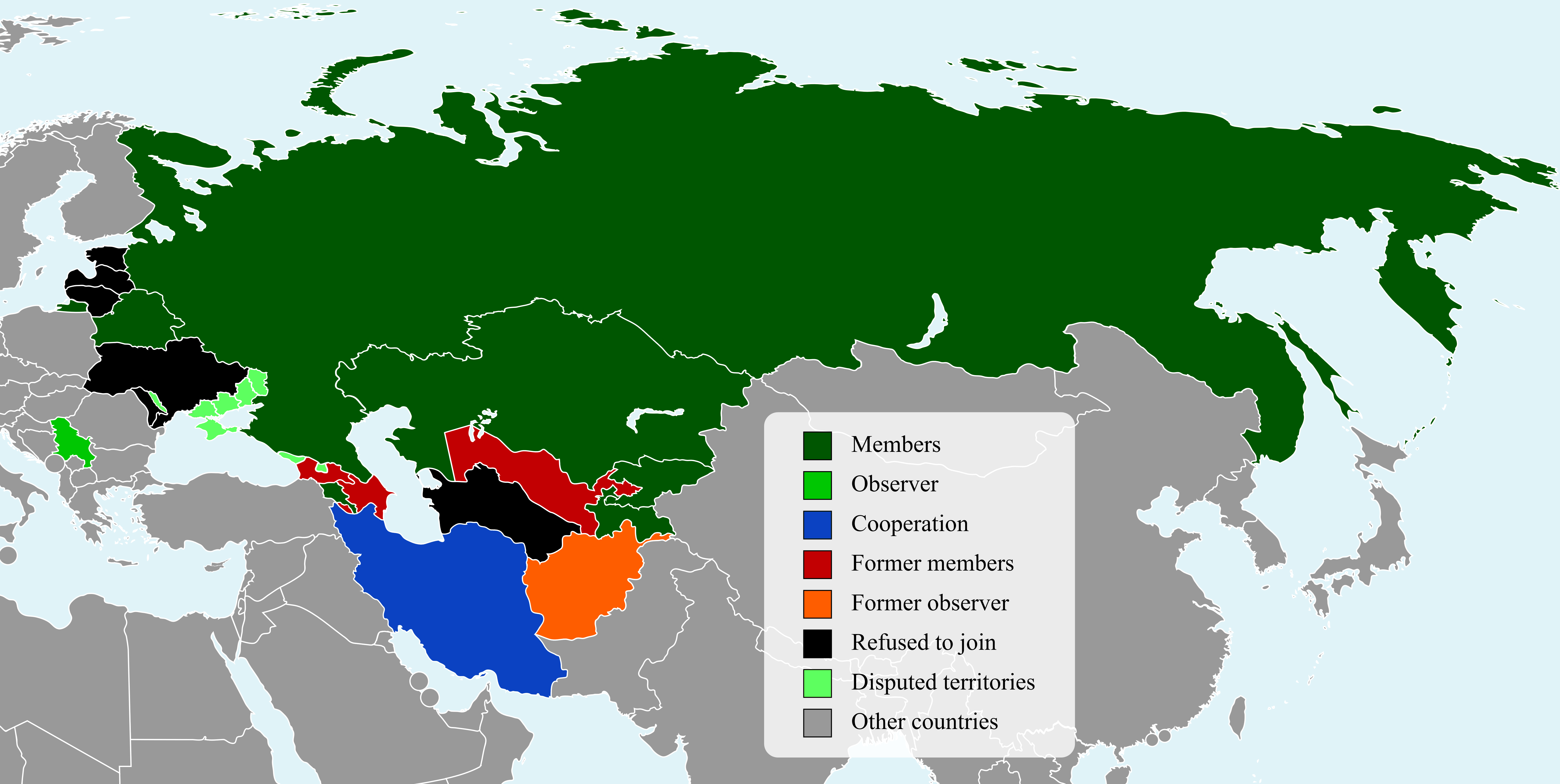

Map showing the CSTO members, observers, and associated members. Includes the Russian-occupied territories of Ukraine, the Russian-occupied territories in Georgia, and the breakaway republic Transnistria.

Member states of the Collective Security Treaty Organization:

Member country	Capital	Population	Area	Ratification of Collective Security Treaty	Ratification of the Protocol on extension of the treaty	Ratification of the CSTO charter
Armenia (suspended)	Yerevan	3,015,400	29,743 km^{2} (11,484 sq mi)	15 May 1992	2 April 1999	18 September 2003
Belarus	Minsk	9,155,000	207,595 km^{2} (80,153 sq mi)	31 December 1993 (Note: Did not sign original treaty.)	2 April 1999	18 September 2003
Kazakhstan	Astana	20,286,000	2,724,900 km^{2} (1,052,090 sq mi)	15 May 1992	2 April 1999	18 September 2003
Kyrgyzstan	Bishkek	7,213,000	200,105 km^{2} (77,261 sq mi)	15 May 1992	2 April 1999	18 September 2003
Russia	Moscow	146,150,000	17,125,191 km^{2} (6,612,073 sq mi)	15 May 1992	2 April 1999	18 September 2003
Tajikistan	Dushanbe	10,786,000	143,100 km^{2} (55,251 sq mi)	15 May 1992	2 April 1999	18 September 2003

=== Former member states ===
Former member country	Capital	Ratification of Collective Security Treaty	Withdraw from the treaty	Reasons
Azerbaijan	Baku	24 September 1993	2 April 1999	Did not sign the Protocol on extension of the Treaty
Georgia	Tbilisi	9 September 1993	2 April 1999	Did not sign the Protocol on extension of the Treaty
Uzbekistan	Tashkent	15 May 1992	2 April 1999	Did not sign the Protocol on extension of the Treaty
Uzbekistan	Tashkent	16 August 2006	19 December 2012	Membership suspended

=== Non-member observer states in the CSTO Parliamentary Assembly ===
The National Assembly of the Republic of Serbia and the Wolesi Jirga (lower house) of the National Assembly of the Islamic Republic of Afghanistan were accorded observer status in the CSTO Parliamentary Assembly in 2013, though the Islamic Republic collapsed in 2021 as the Taliban took over. Also, the Parliamentary Assembly of the Union of Belarus and Russia has observer status in the CSTO Parliamentary Assembly.

Country	Participating Body	Year of entry
Serbia	National Assembly of the Republic of Serbia	2013
(Russia) (Belarus) Union State	Parliamentary Assembly of the Union of Belarus and Russia	2010
Afghanistan	National Assembly of the Islamic Republic of Afghanistan	2013-2021

=== Potential membership ===
In May 2007, the CSTO secretary general Nikolai Bordyuzha suggested Iran could join the CSTO saying, "The CSTO is an open organization. If Iran applies in accordance with our charter, we will consider the application". If Iran joined it would be the first state outside the former Soviet Union to become a member of the organization. On December 10, 2024, the chairman of the State Duma Defense Committee Andrey Kartapolov called for looking at granting CSTO membership to Iran, saying "I think that the issue of Iran’s potential membership in the CSTO should be looked at in a more concrete way. Why not, after all? [The CSTO] is not a private club." However, Iran joining the CSTO during an active war would be a very complicated decision for Russia and the other members.

In 2021, Uzbekistan, after becoming observer to EAEU on 11 December 2020, conducted a bilateral military exercise with Russia and a trilateral military exercise with Russia and Tajikistan, while its president joined a CSTO meeting as a guest, sparking rumors about potential reentry into CSTO.

== Structure ==
The current secretary general is Kyrgyz politician and diplomat Taalatbek Masadykov, who took office on 1 January 2026.

=== Council of Ministers of Defense ===
The Council of Ministers of Defense (Russian: Совет министров обороны) is a working body in the CSTO responsible for military policy. It coordinates military cooperation of the CSTO member states, and develops military and defense policy of the CSTO. Its membership is as follows:

Country	Minister	Rank	Photo
Armenia	Suren Papikyan	N/A (Civilian)	
Belarus	Viktor Khrenin	Lieutenant general	
Kazakhstan	Dauren Qosanov	Lieutenant general	
Kyrgyzstan	Ruslan Mukambetov	Major general	
Russia	Andrey Belousov	1st class Active State Councillor of the Russian Federation	
Tajikistan	Emomali Sobirzoda	Lieutenant general	

== Policy agenda ==
=== Information technology and cyber security ===
The member states adopted measures to counter cyber security threats and information technology crimes in a Foreign Ministers Council meeting in Minsk, Belarus. Foreign Minister Abdrakhmanov put forward a proposal to establishing a Cyber Shield system.

== Military personnel ==
The following list is sourced from the 2020 edition of "The Military Balance" published annually by the International Institute for Strategic Studies.

Country	Active Military	Reserve Military	Paramilitary	Total	Per 1000 Capita (Total)	Per 1000 Capita (Active)	Notes
Armenia	70,600	210,000	4,300	284,900	93.6	23.2	(Note: The reserve military of Armenia consists mostly of ex-conscripts who have seen service within the last 15 years.)
Belarus	85,000	580,750	110,000	775,750	81.2	8.9	
Kazakhstan	108,000	132,000	30,000	270,000	13.8	5.5	
Kyrgyzstan	23,000	300,500	9,500	333,000	57.5	4	
Russia	1,320,000	2,000,000	554,000	3,874,000	27.2	9.3	(Note: The potential reserve personnel of Russia may be as high as 20 million, depending on how the figures are counted. However, an estimated 2 million have seen military service within the last five years.)
Tajikistan	9,500	600,000	7,500	617,000	72.9	1.1	

== See also ==
- Armenia–CSTO relations
- BRICS
- Commonwealth of Independent States (CIS)
- Community for Democracy and Rights of Nations
- Eurasian Economic Community (EURASEC)
- Eurasian Economic Union (EAEU)
- GUAM Organization for Democracy and Economic Development (GUAM)
- North Atlantic Treaty Organization (NATO)
- Organization for Security and Co-operation in Europe (OSCE)
- Post-Soviet states
- Shanghai Cooperation Organisation (SCO)
- Soviet Armed Forces
- Warsaw Pact
