= Demographics of Europe =

European countries by population in 2025: More than 100 million Between 30 and 100 million Between 10 and 30 million Between 3 and 10 million Between 1 and 3 million Between 0.3 and 1 million Less than 0.3 million

Population growth in 2021

Figures for the population of Europe vary according to the particular definition of Europe's boundaries. In 2018, Europe had a total population of over 745 million people. Around 448 million of them lived in the European Union and around 110 million in European Russia; Russia is the most populous country in Europe.

Europe's population growth is low, and its median age high. Most of Europe is in a mode of sub-replacement fertility, which means that each new(-born) generation is less populous than the one before. Nonetheless, most West European countries still have growing populations, mainly due to immigration within Europe and from outside Europe and some due to increases in life expectancy and population momentum. Some current and past factors in European demography have included emigration, ethnic relations, economic immigration, a declining birth rate and an ageing population.

== History ==
=== Prehistory ===
Approximately 5,000–130,000 people lived in Europe during the Last Glacial Maximum about 20,000 years ago.

According to Volker Heyd, an archaeologist at the University of Helsinki, up to 7 million people lived in Neolithic Europe in 3000 BC.

According to archaeologist Johannes Müller, the European population was about 1 million around 6500 BC, but increased to 8 million in 2000 BC.

The following table shows estimates of historical population sizes of Europe (including Central Asia, listed under "former USSR") based on Maddison (2007), in millions, with an estimated percentage of world population:

Population of Europe, in millions, by year (est.)
Year	Population (millions)	Percentage of world total
AD 1	34	15%
1000	40	15%
1500	78	18%
1600	112	20%
1700	127	21%
1820	224	21%
1913	498	28%
2000	742	13%

=== Past populations of Europe in modern national borders, AD 1–2020 ===
Population by year (in thousands)
Country/region	1	1000	1500	1600	1700	1820	1870	1913	1950	1973	1998	2020
Austria	500	705	2000	2500	2500	3369	4520	6767	6935	7586	8078	8901
Belgium	300	400	1400	1600	2000	3424	5096	7666	8640	9738	10197	11493
Denmark	180	360	600	650	700	1155	1888	2983	4269	5022	5303	5823
Finland	20	40	300	400	400	1169	1754	3027	4009	4666	5153	5536
France	5000	6500	15000	18500	21471	31246	38440	41463	41836	52118	58805	67287
Germany	3000	3500	12000	16000	15000	24905	39231	65058	68371	78956	82029	83191
Italy	7000	5000	10500	13100	13300	20176	27888	37248	47105	54751	57592	59258
Netherlands	200	300	950	1500	1900	2355	3615	6164	10114	13438	15700	17425
Norway	100	200	300	400	500	970	1735	2447	3265	3961	4432	5368
Sweden	200	400	550	760	1260	2585	4164	5621	7015	8137	8851	10379
Switzerland	300	300	650	1000	1200	1829	2664	3864	4694	6441	7130	8667
United Kingdom	800	2000	3942	6170	8565	21226	31393	45649	50363	56223	59237	67886
Portugal	500	600	1000	1100	2000	3297	4353	6004	8512	8634	9968	10305
Spain	4500	4000	6800	8240	8770	12203	16201	20263	27868	34810	39371	48692
Greece	2000	1000	1000	1500	1500	2312			7554	8929	10835	10689
13 small countries	100	113	276	358	394	657						
Total Western Europe	24700	25413	57268	73778	81460	132888	187532	261007	305060	358390	388399	419639
Albania	200	200	200	200	300	437			1215	2296	3108	2878
Bulgaria	500	800	800	1250	1250	2187		4200	7251	8621	8257	6917
Czechoslovakia	1000	1250	3000	4500	4500	7190			12393	14563	15686	16366
– Czech Rep.									10221	8930	10295	10702
– Slovakia									3463	4642	5391	5460
Hungary	300	500	1250	1250	1500	4571			9338	10432	10237	9770
Poland	450	1200	4000	5000	6000	10426			25753	33363	38666	38268
Romania	800	800	2000	2000	2500	6389		7360	16311	20828	22503	19266
Yugoslavia	1500	1750	2250	2750	2750	5215			16578	21088		
Eastern Europe	4750	6500	13500	16950	18800	36415	52182	79604	139428	173037	164513	151529
Former USSR	3900	7100	16950	20700	26550	54765	88672	156192	180050	249748	290866	299173
– Russia									102833	132434	147671	146171
– Ukraine								31142	36905	48274	50370	41902
World	230820	268273	437818	555828	603410	1041092	1270014	1791020	2524531	3913482	5907680	7800000

Percentages of world population, by year
Country/region	1	1000	1500	1600	1700	1820	1870	1913	1950	1973	1998	2018
Austria	0.2	0.3	0.5	0.4	0.4	0.3	0.4	0.4	0.3	0.2	0.1	
Belgium	0.1	0.1	0.3	0.3	0.3	0.3	0.4	0.4	0.3	0.2	0.2	
Denmark	0.1	0.1	0.1	0.1	0.1	0.1	0.1	0.2	0.2	0.1	0.1	
Finland	0.0	0.0	0.1	0.1	0.1	0.1	0.1	0.2	0.2	0.1	0.1	
France	2.2	2.4	3.4	3.3	3.6	3.0	3.0	2.3	1.7	1.3	1.0	
Germany	1.3	1.3	2.7	2.9	2.5	2.4	3.1	3.6	2.7	2.0	1.4	
Italy	3.0	1.9	2.4	2.4	2.2	1.9	2.2	2.1	1.9	1.4	1.0	
Netherlands	0.1	0.1	0.2	0.3	0.3	0.2	0.3	0.3	0.4	0.3	0.3	
Norway	0.0	0.1	0.1	0.1	0.1	0.1	0.1	0.1	0.1	0.1	0.1	
Sweden	0.1	0.1	0.1	0.1	0.2	0.2	0.3	0.3	0.3	0.2	0.1	
Switzerland	0.1	0.1	0.1	0.2	0.2	0.2	0.2	0.2	0.2	0.2	0.1	
United Kingdom	0.3	0.7	0.9	1.1	1.4	2.0	2.5	2.5	2.0	1.4	1.0	
Portugal	0.2	0.2	0.2	0.2	0.3	0.3	0.3	0.3	0.3	0.2	0.2	
Spain	1.9	1.5	1.6	1.5	1.5	1.2	1.3	1.1	1.1	0.9	0.7	
Other	0.9	0.4	0.3	0.3	0.3	0.3	0.4	0.4	0.5	0.4	0.3	
Total Western Europe	10.7	9.5	13.1	13.3	13.5	12.8	14.8	14.6	12.1	9.2	6.6	
Eastern Europe	2.1	2.4	3.1	3.0	3.1	3.5	4.1	4.4	3.5	2.8	2.0	
Former USSR	1.7	2.6	3.9	3.7	4.4	5.3	7.0	8.7	7.1	6.4	4.9	
Total Europe	14.5	14.5	20.1	20.0	21.0	21.6	25.9	27.7	22.7	18.4	13.5	9.8
World	100.0	100.0	100.0	100.0	100.0	100.0	100.0	100.0	100.0	100.0	100.0	100.0

Note: These numbers do not include the population of European countries' colonies, only the population within Europe.

== Population ==
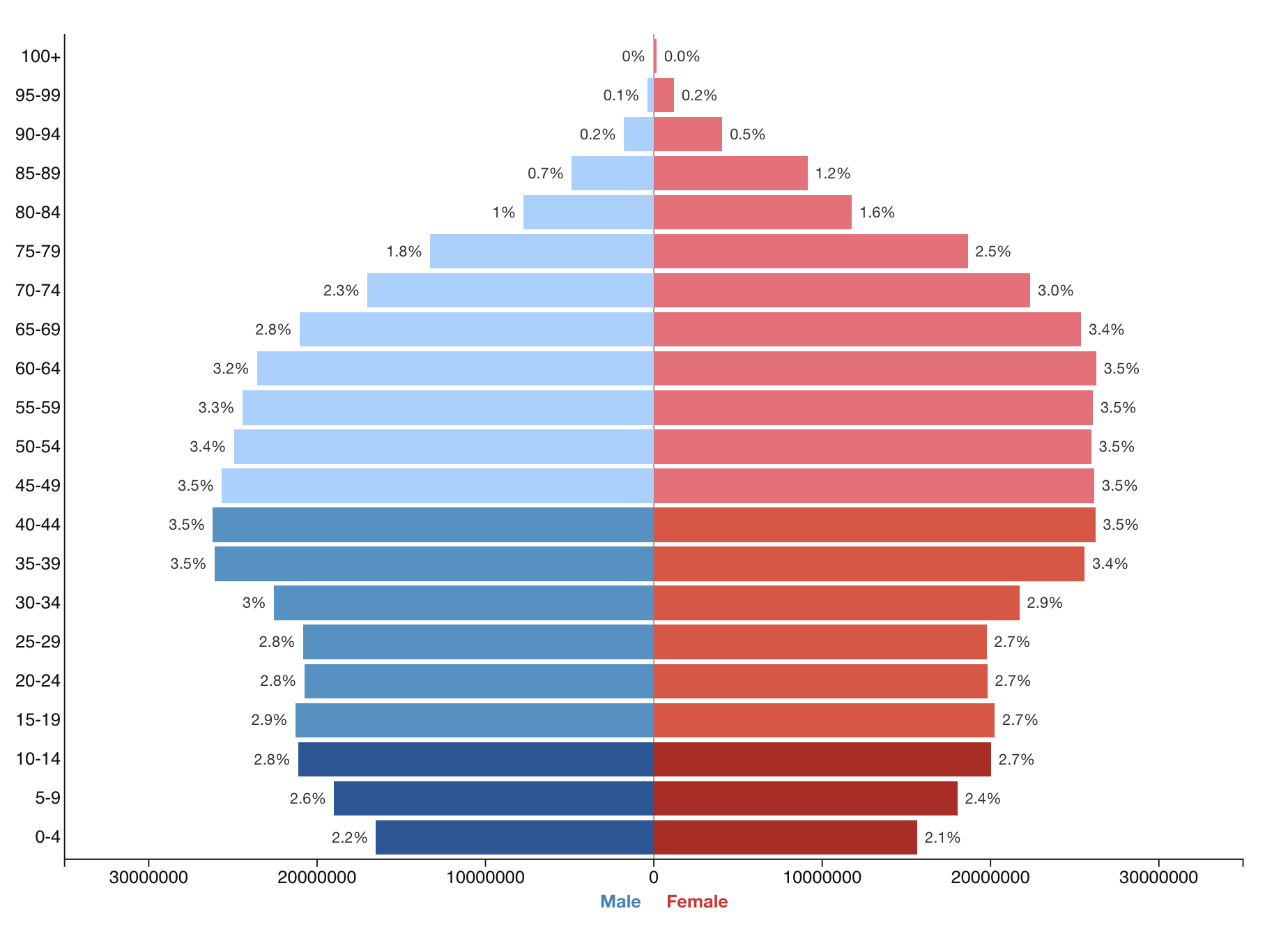
Population pyramid of Europe in 2026 based on the collective United Nations geoscheme for Europe

Europe population pyramid from 1950 to 2026

330,000,000 people lived in Europe in 1916. In 1950 there were 549,000,000. The population of Europe in 2015 was estimated to be 741 million according to the United Nations, which was slightly less than 11% of the world population. The precise figure depends on the exact definition of the geographic extent of Europe. The population of the European Union (EU) was 509 million as of 2015. Non-EU countries situated in Europe in their entirety account for another 90 million. Five transcontinental countries have a total of 247 million people, of which about half reside in Europe proper.

As it stands now, around 10% of the world's people live in Europe. If demographic trends keep their pace, its share may fall to around 7% in 2050, but still amounting to 716 million people in absolute numbers, according to the United Nations estimate. (The decline in the percentage is partly due to high fertility rates in Africa and South America.) The sub-replacement fertility and high life expectancy in most European states mean a declining and aging population.

=== Population growth ===
EU fertility has declined in the 2020s.

According to Eurostat, the average birth rate in the European Union was 1.5 children per woman in 2020. The EU countries with the highest rates were France (1.83 live births per woman), Romania (1.80) and Czechia (1.71). The lowest rates were found in Malta (1.13), Spain (1.19) and Italy (1.24).

The reasons that Italian citizens give for not having children are economic costs, fear of losing their jobs, and lack of services for families.

Eurostat says that the proportion of children born to foreign mothers, including both from other EU member states and from non-EU countries, has been increasing in the EU since 2013 and stood at 21% in 2020.

=== Age ===
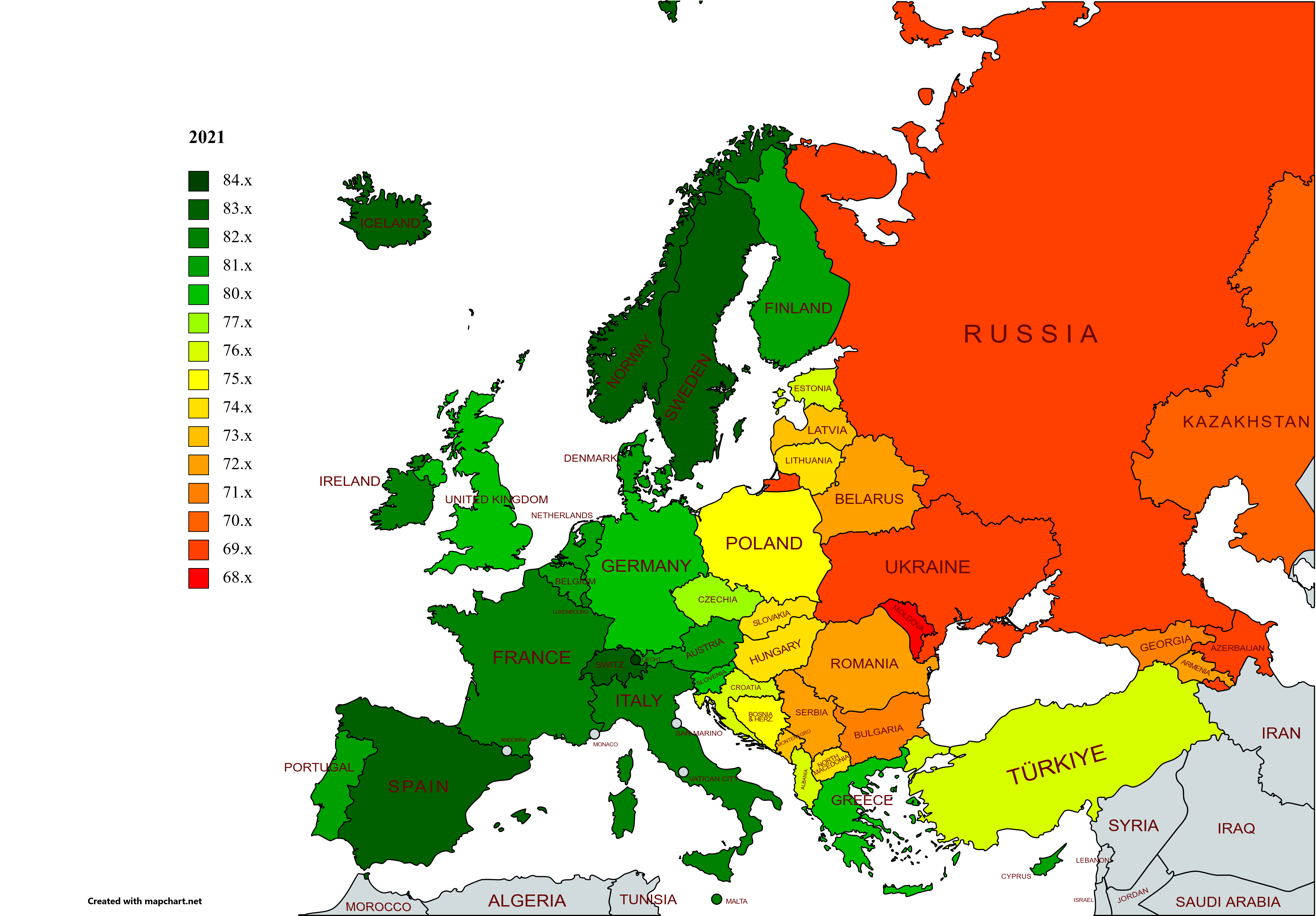
Life expectancy in Europe in 2021

Mirroring their mostly sub-replacement fertility and high life expectancy, European countries tend to have older populations overall. They had nine of the top ten highest median ages in national populations in 2005. Only Japan had an older population.

Population pyramids by country (mostly 2020 and 2023 unless stated otherwise)
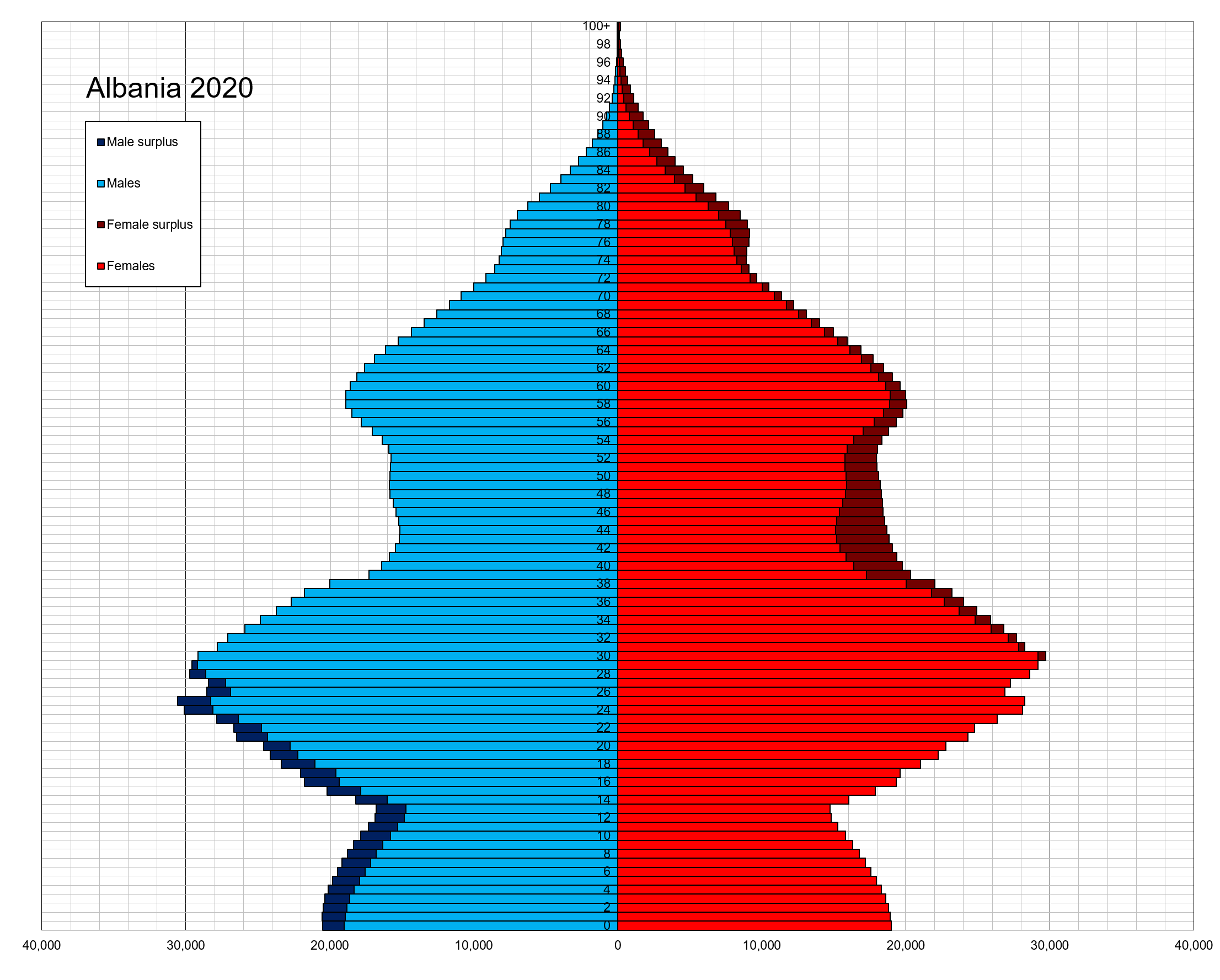
Albania

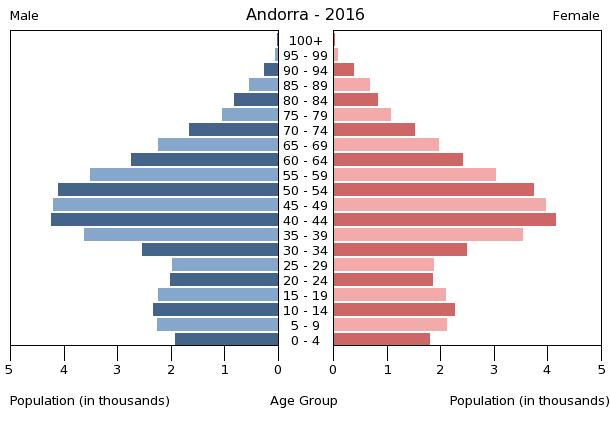
Andorra (2016)

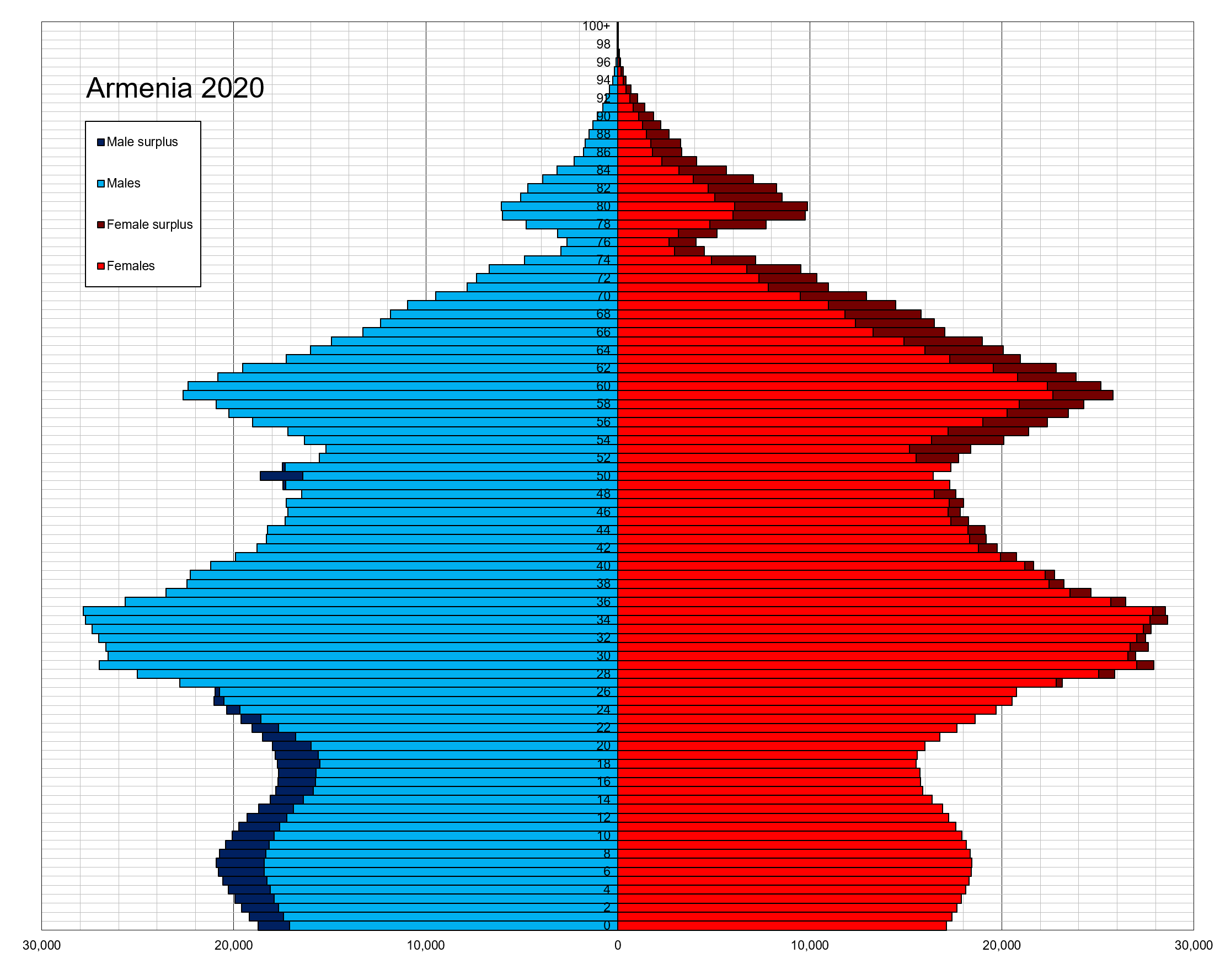
Armenia

Austria

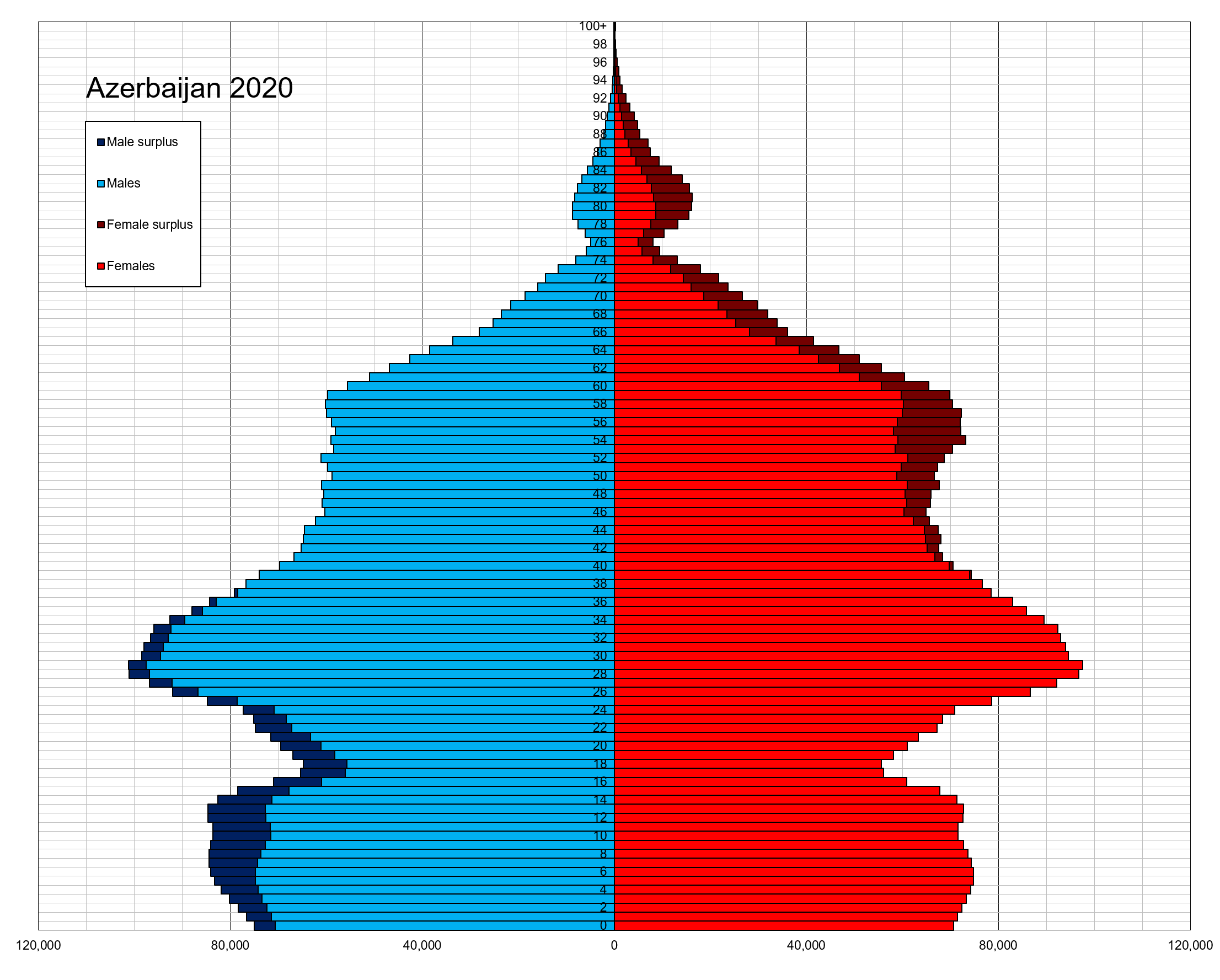
Azerbaijan

Belarus

Belgium

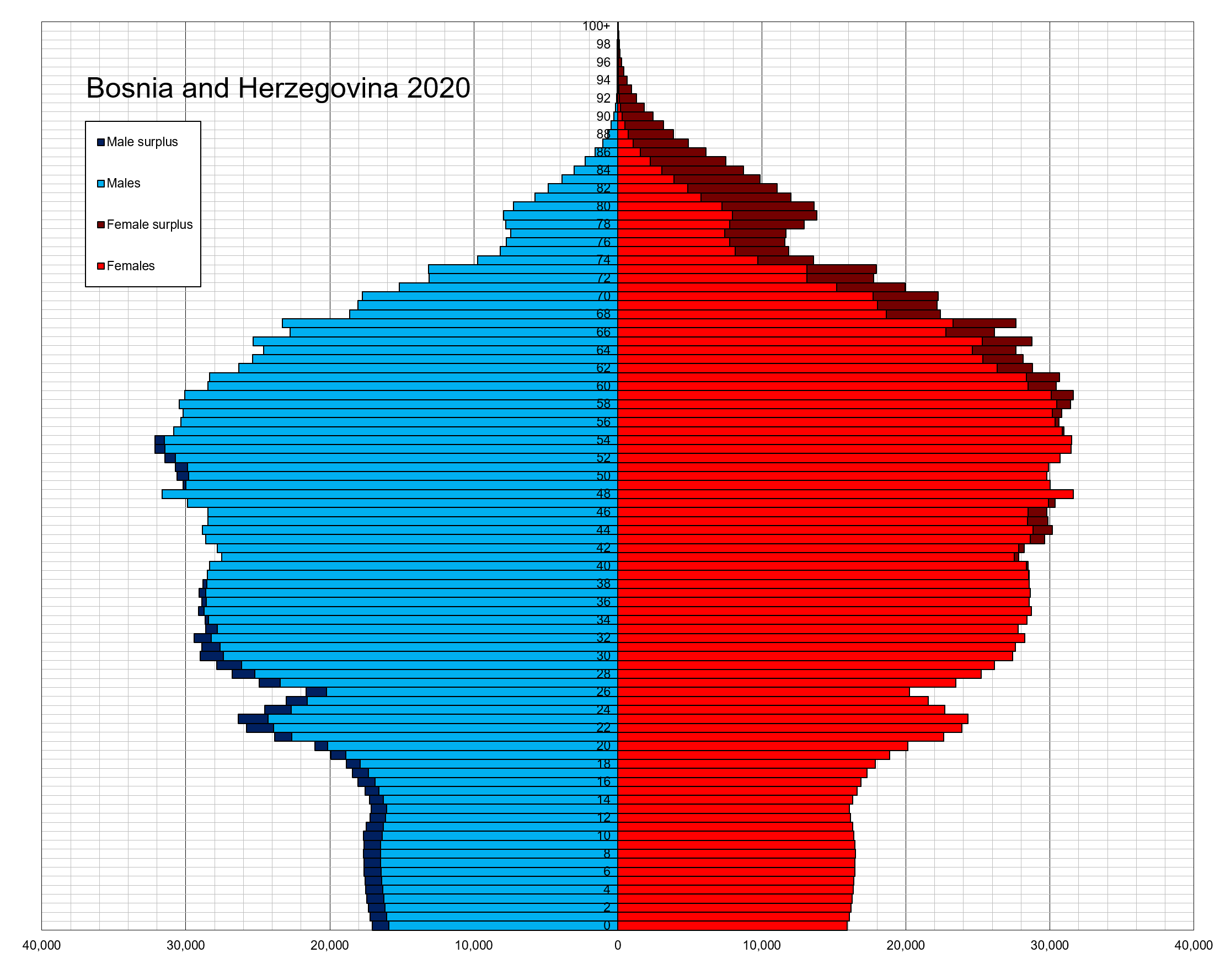
Bosnia and Herzegovina

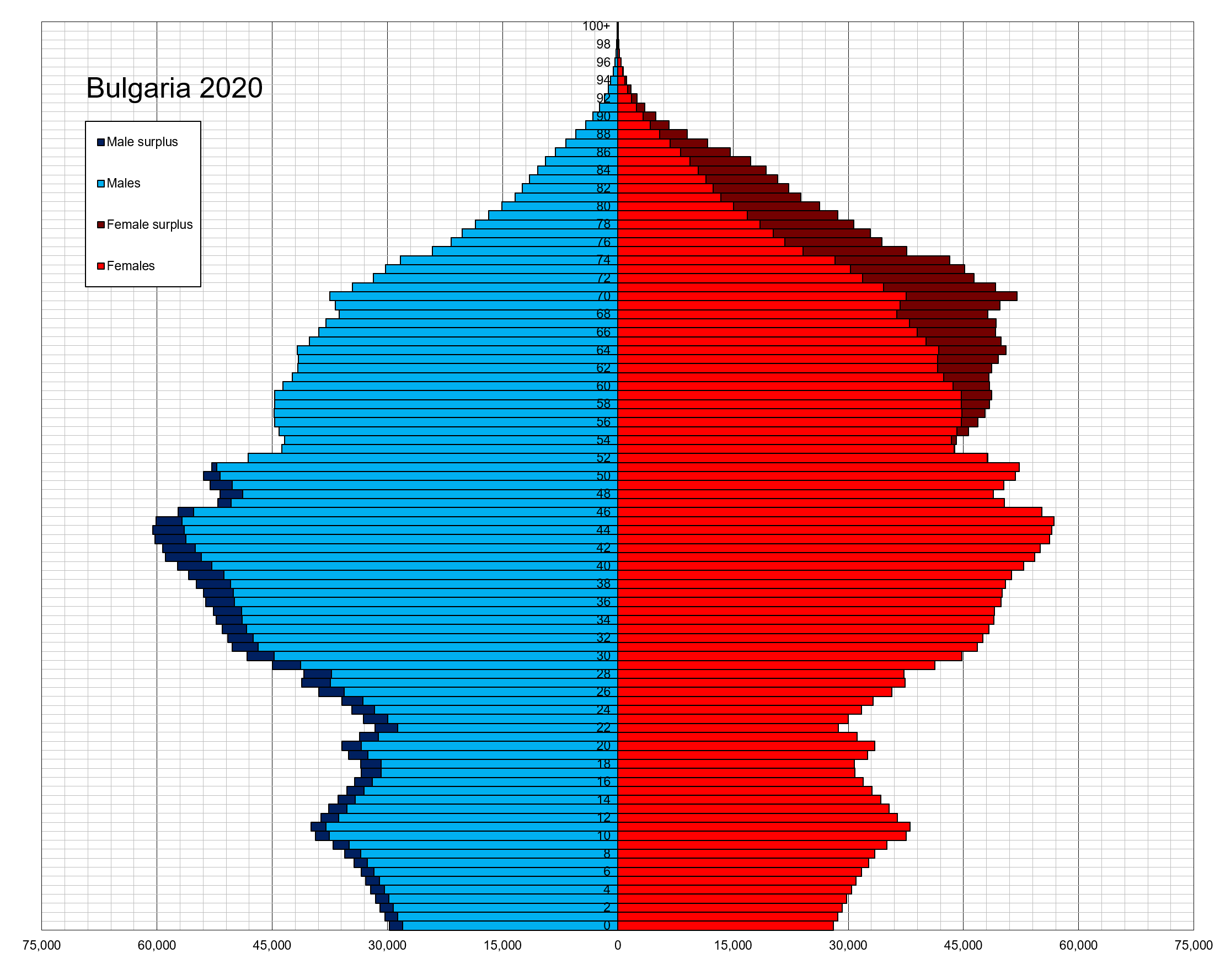
Bulgaria

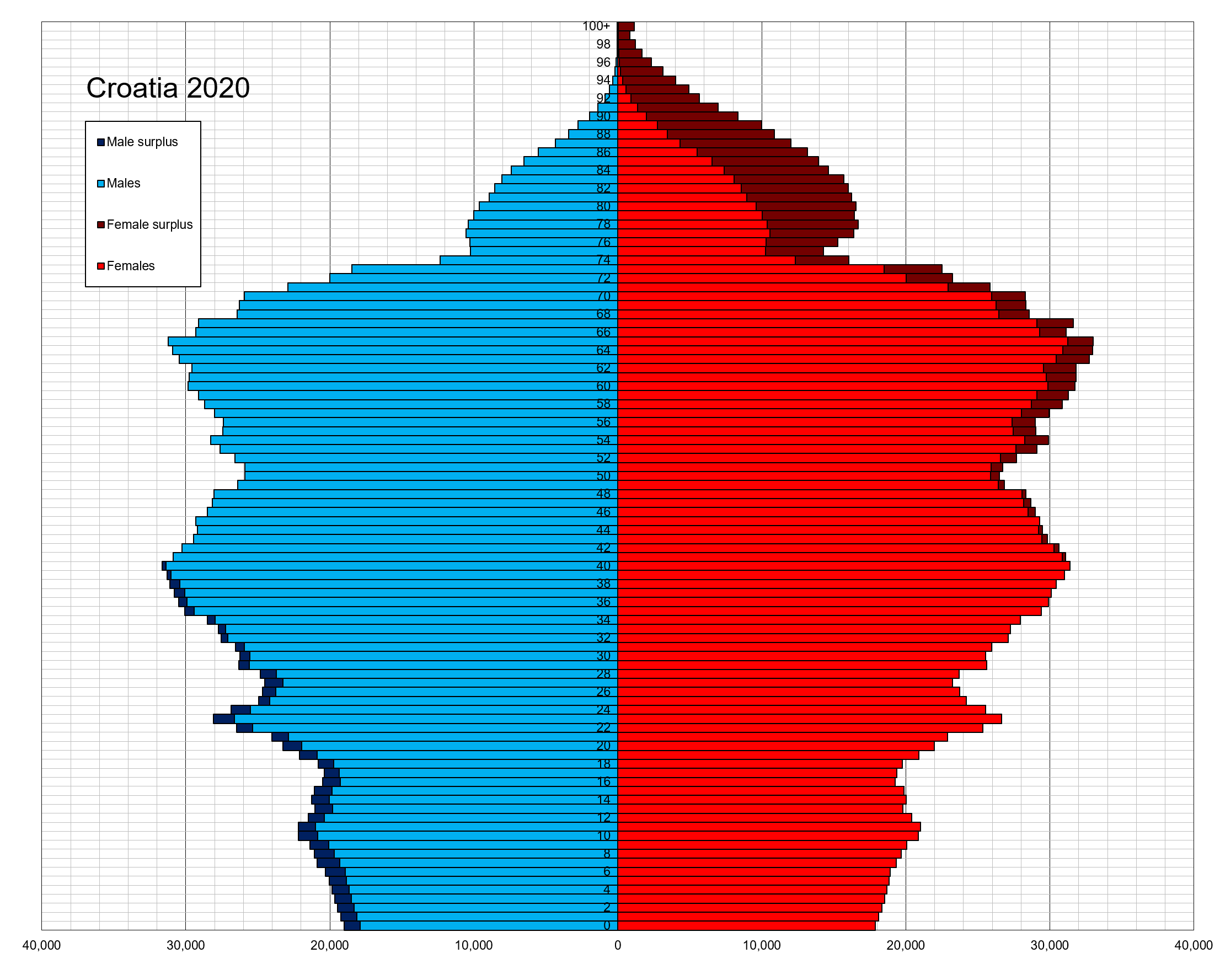
Croatia

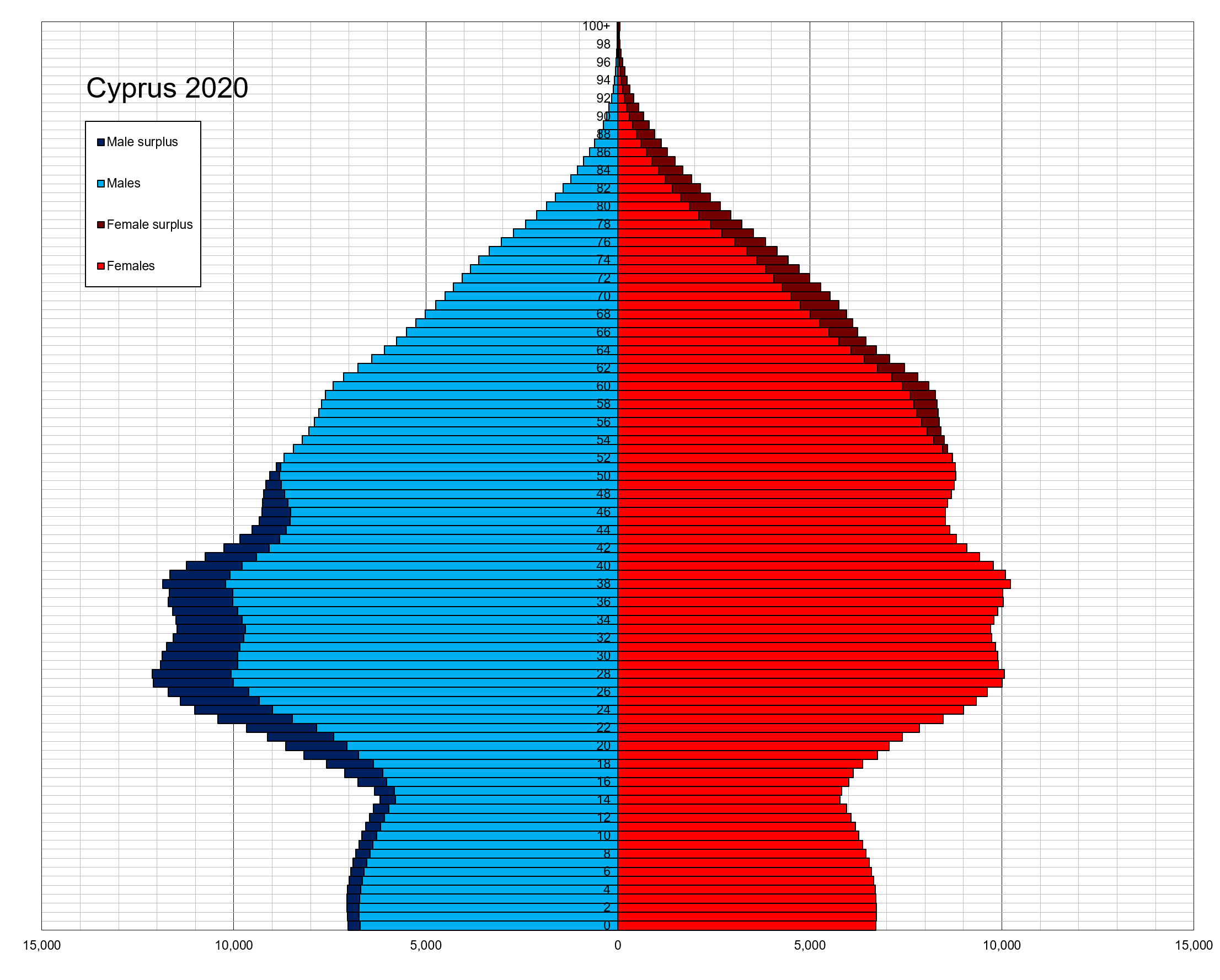
Cyprus

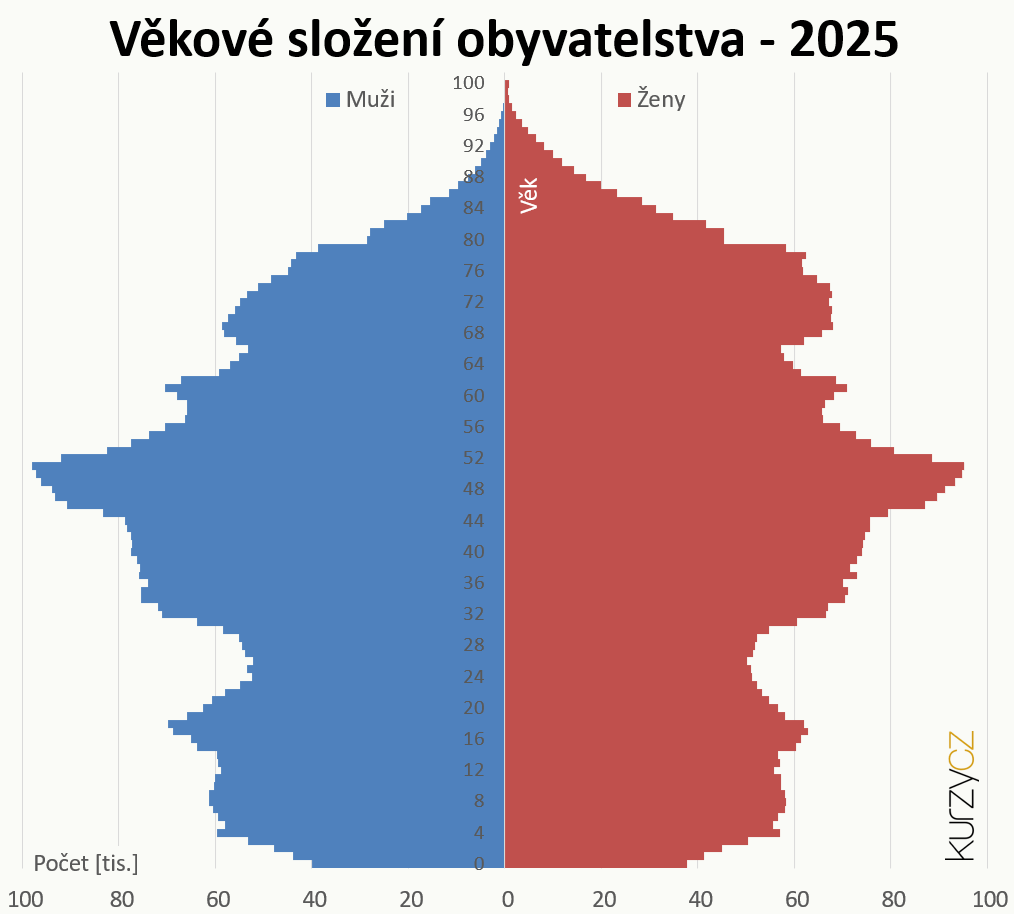
Czech Republic (2024)

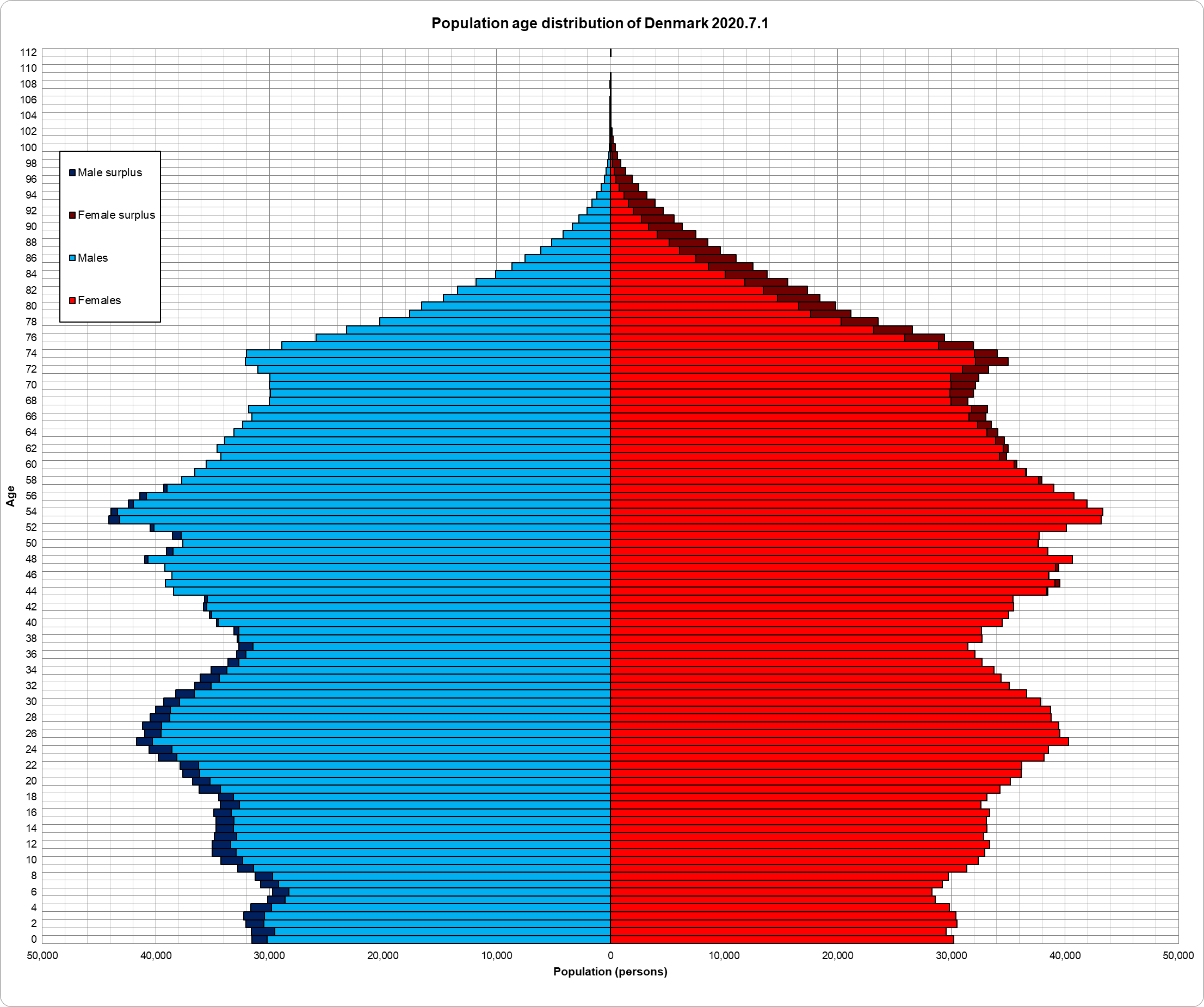
Denmark

Estonia (2021)

Finland (2020)

France (2021)

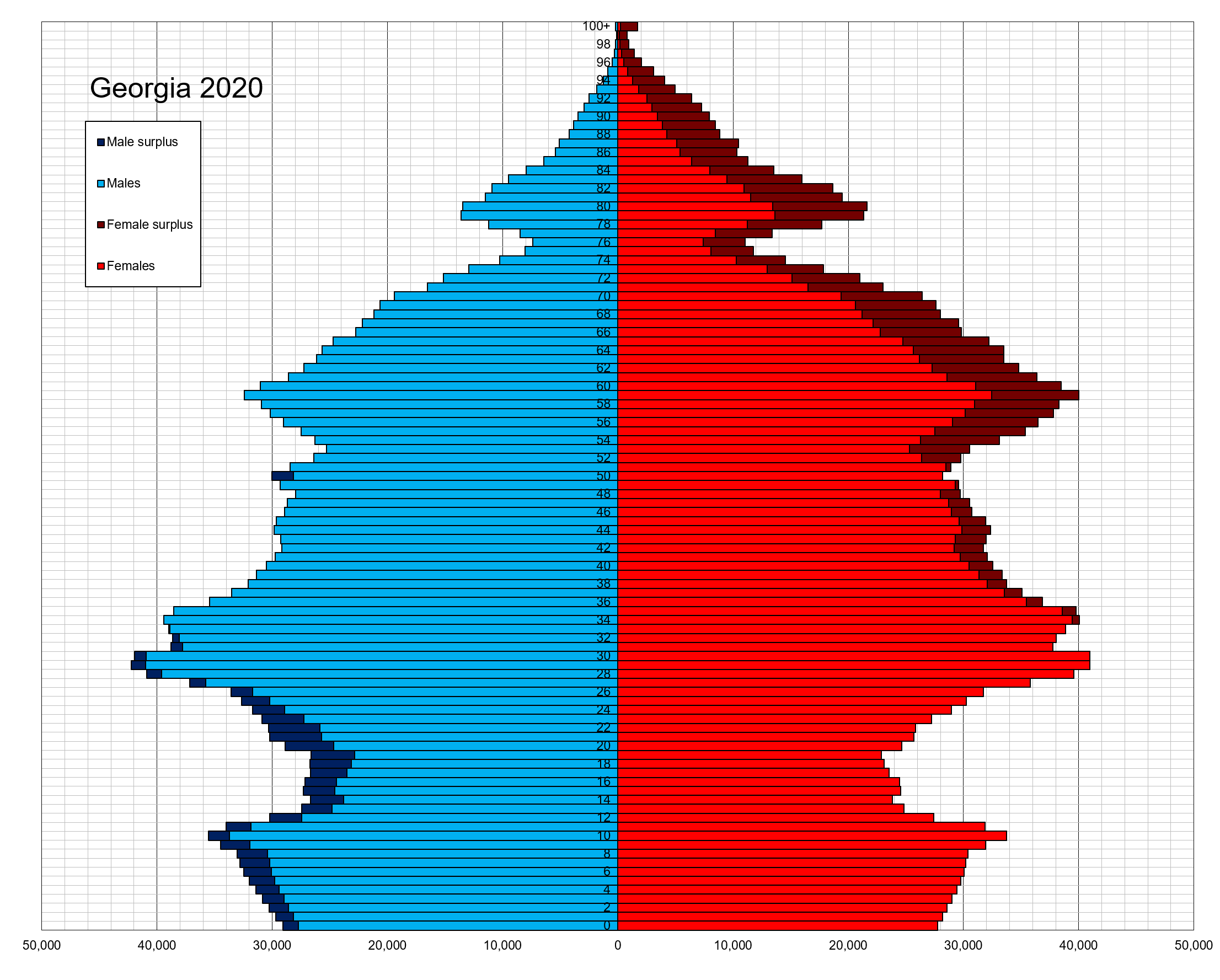
Georgia

Germany (2020)

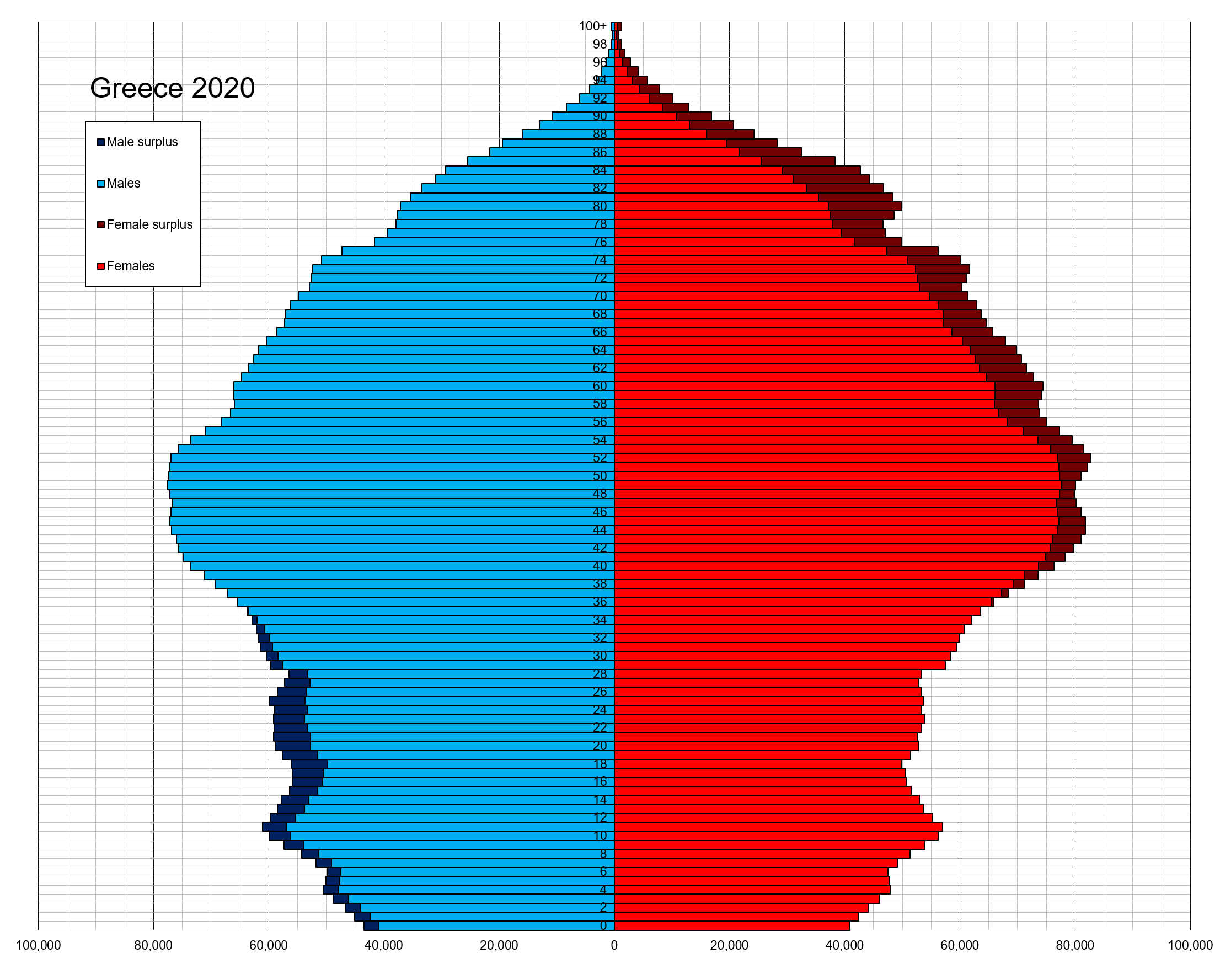
Greece

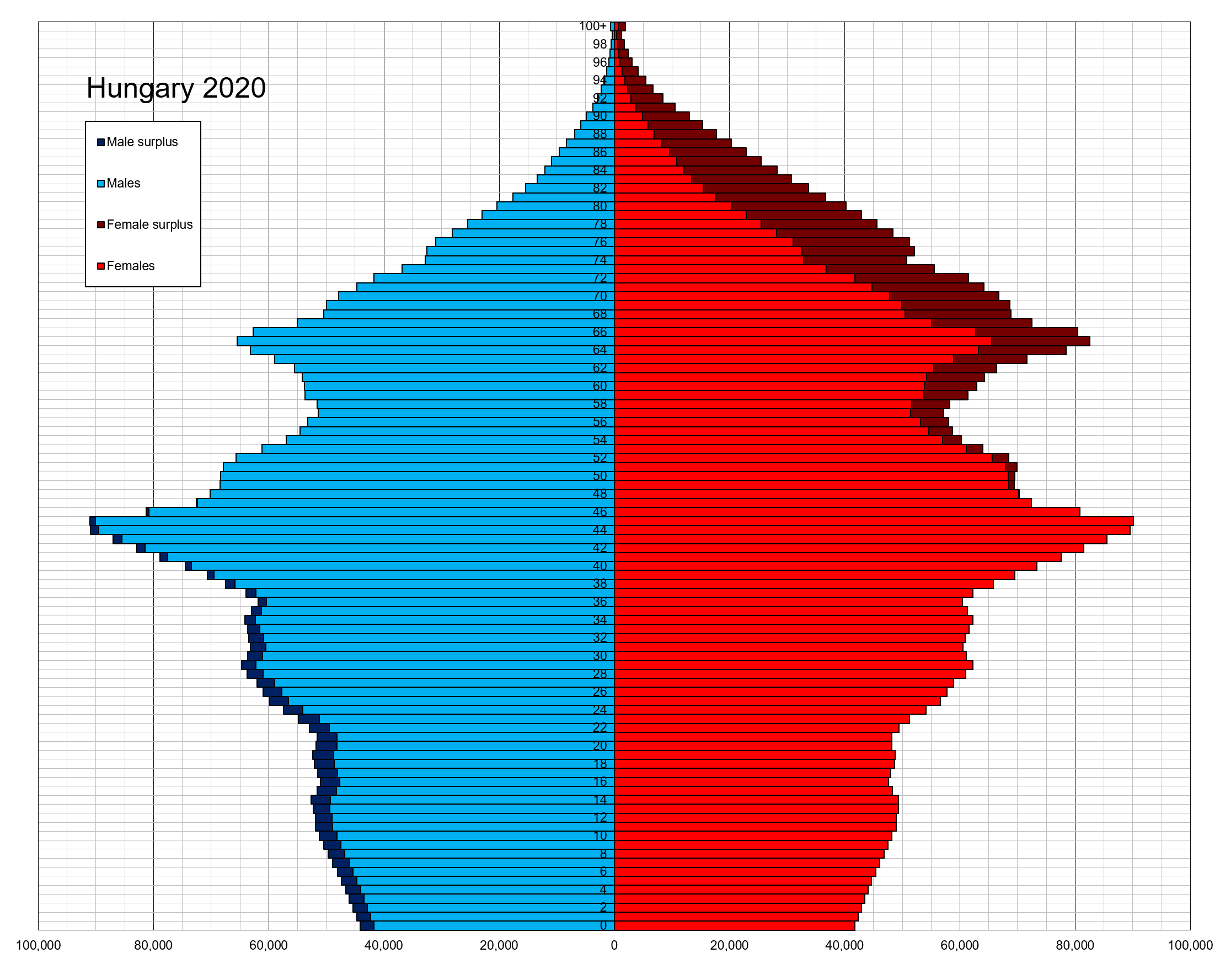
Hungary

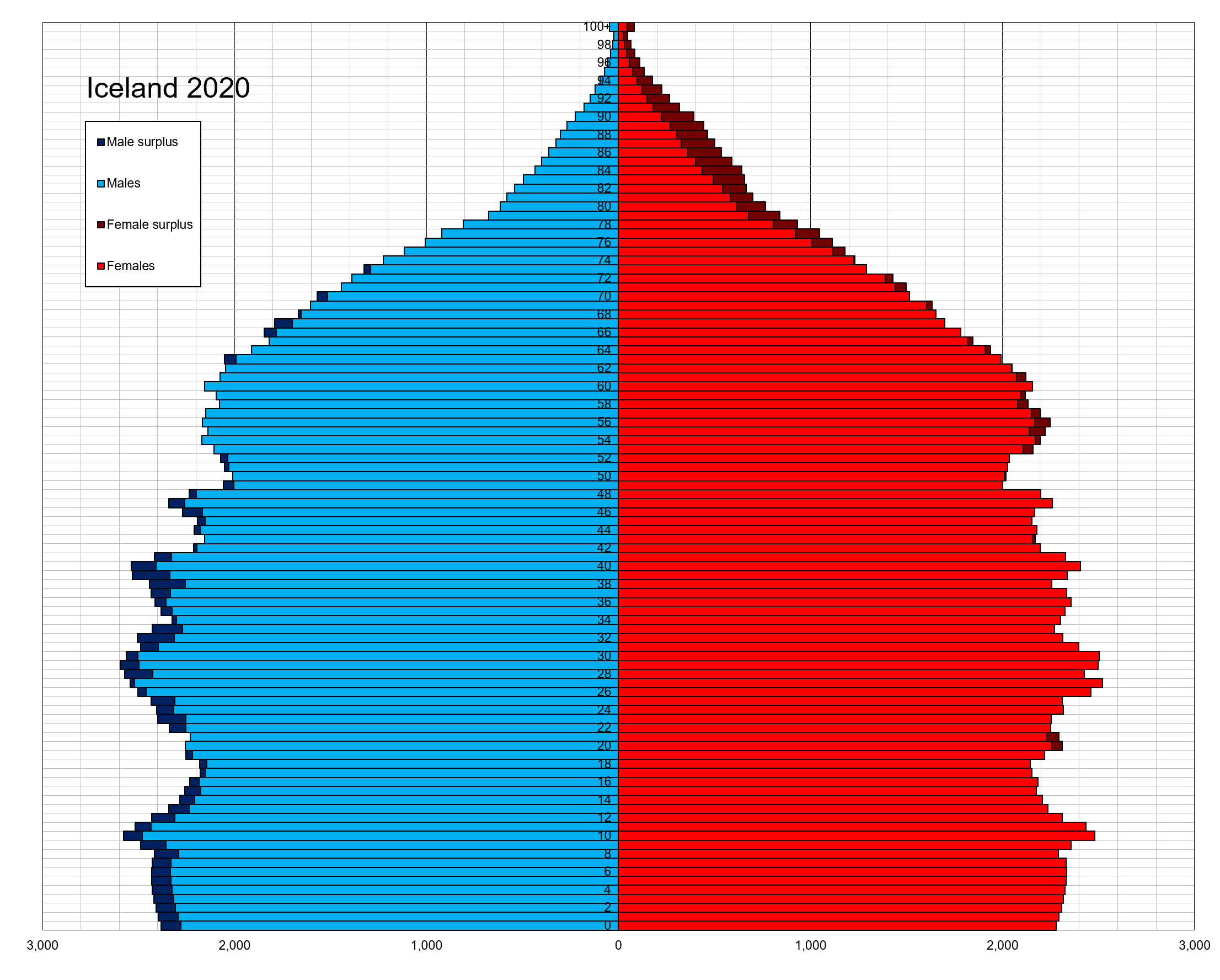
Iceland

Ireland

Italy

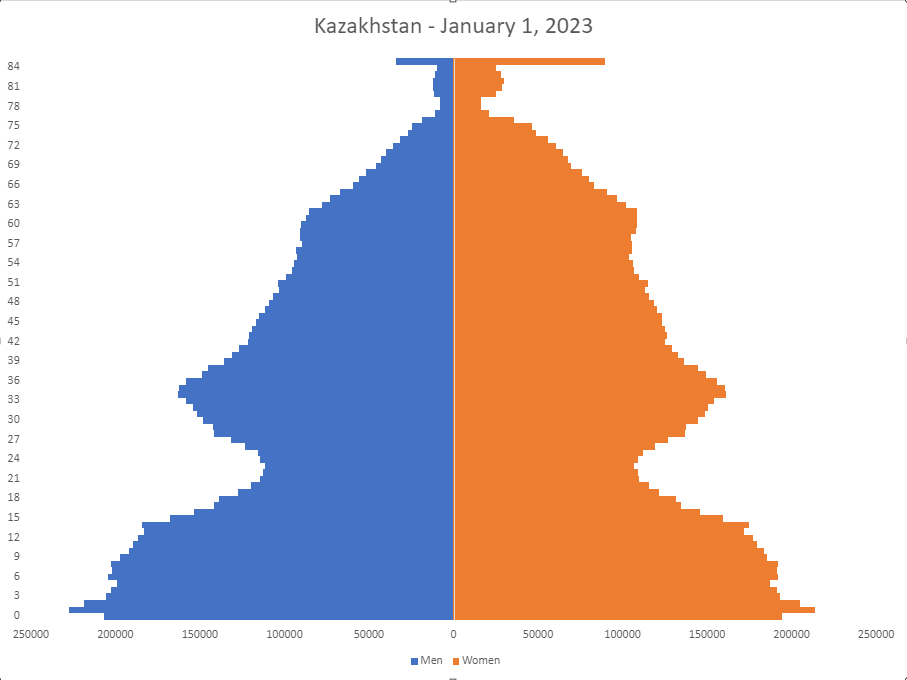
Kazakhstan

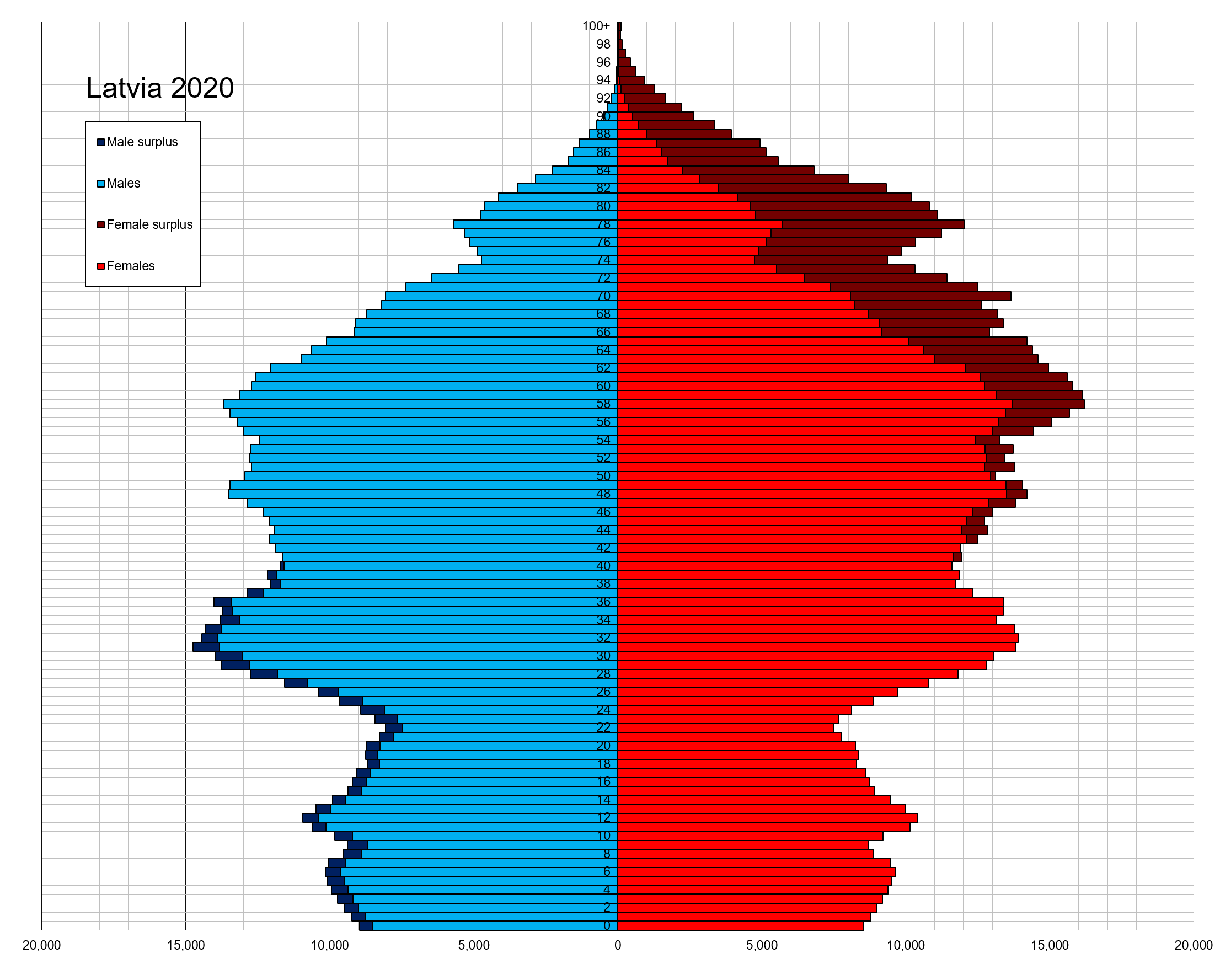
Latvia

Lithuania (2022)

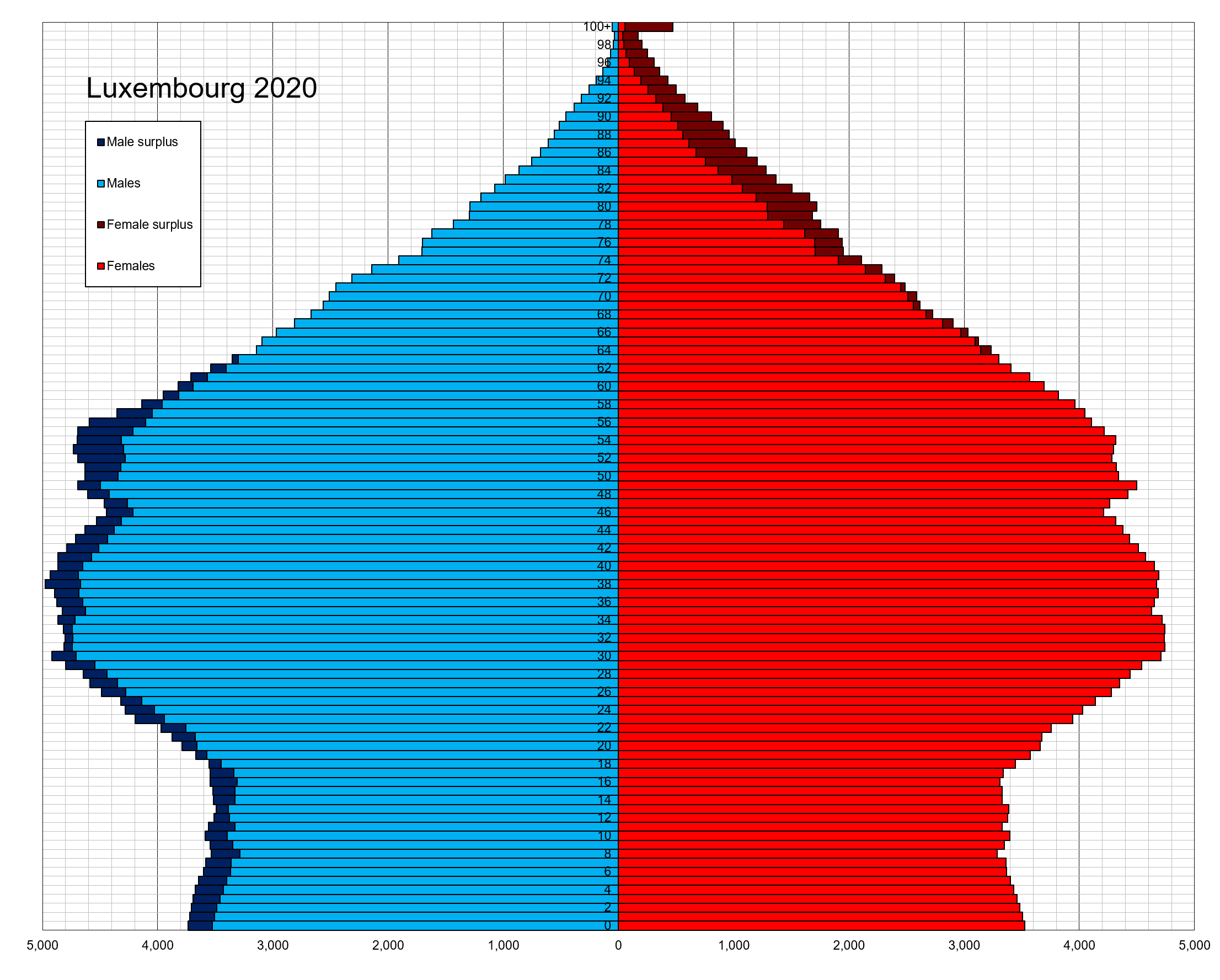
Luxembourg

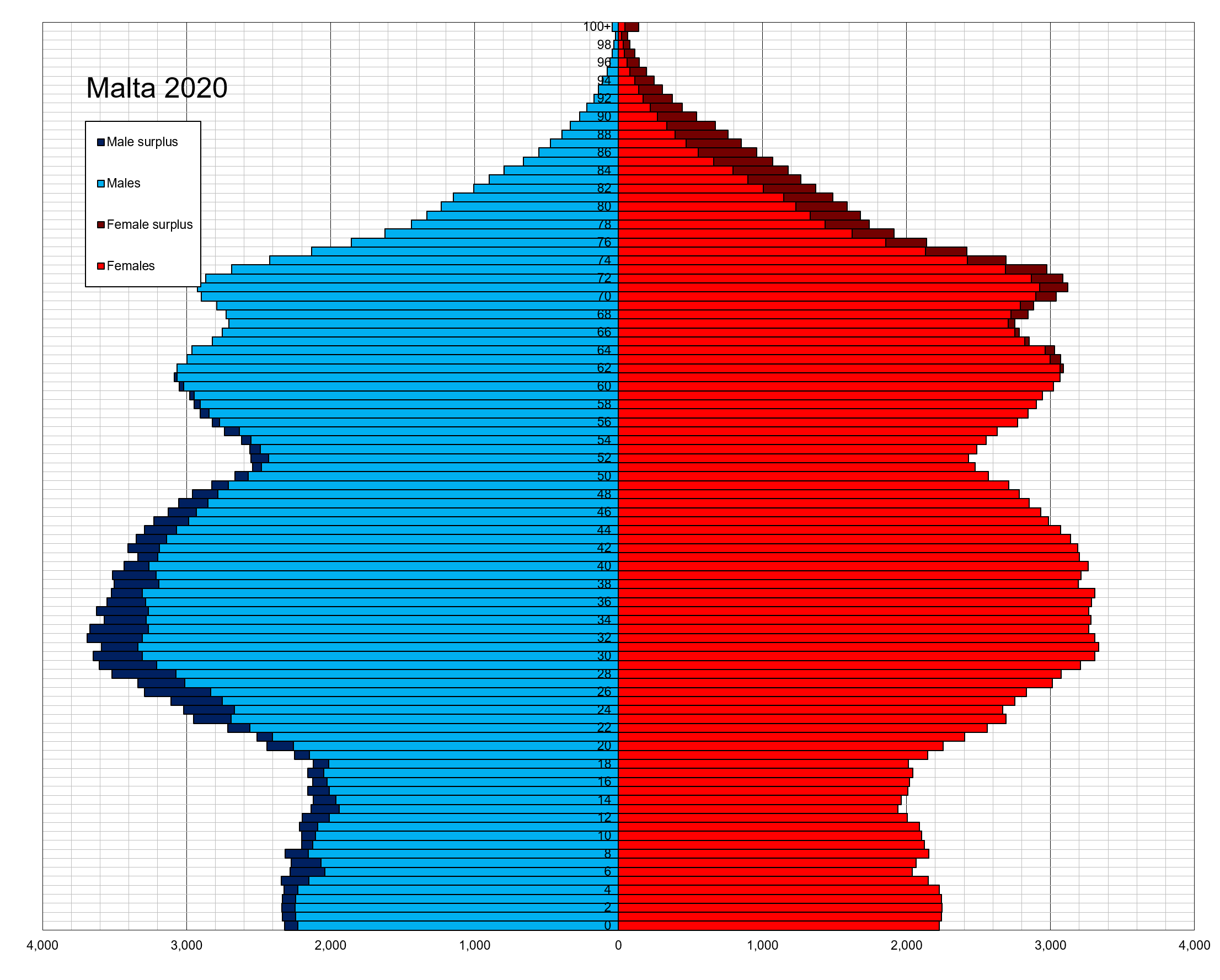
Malta

Moldova

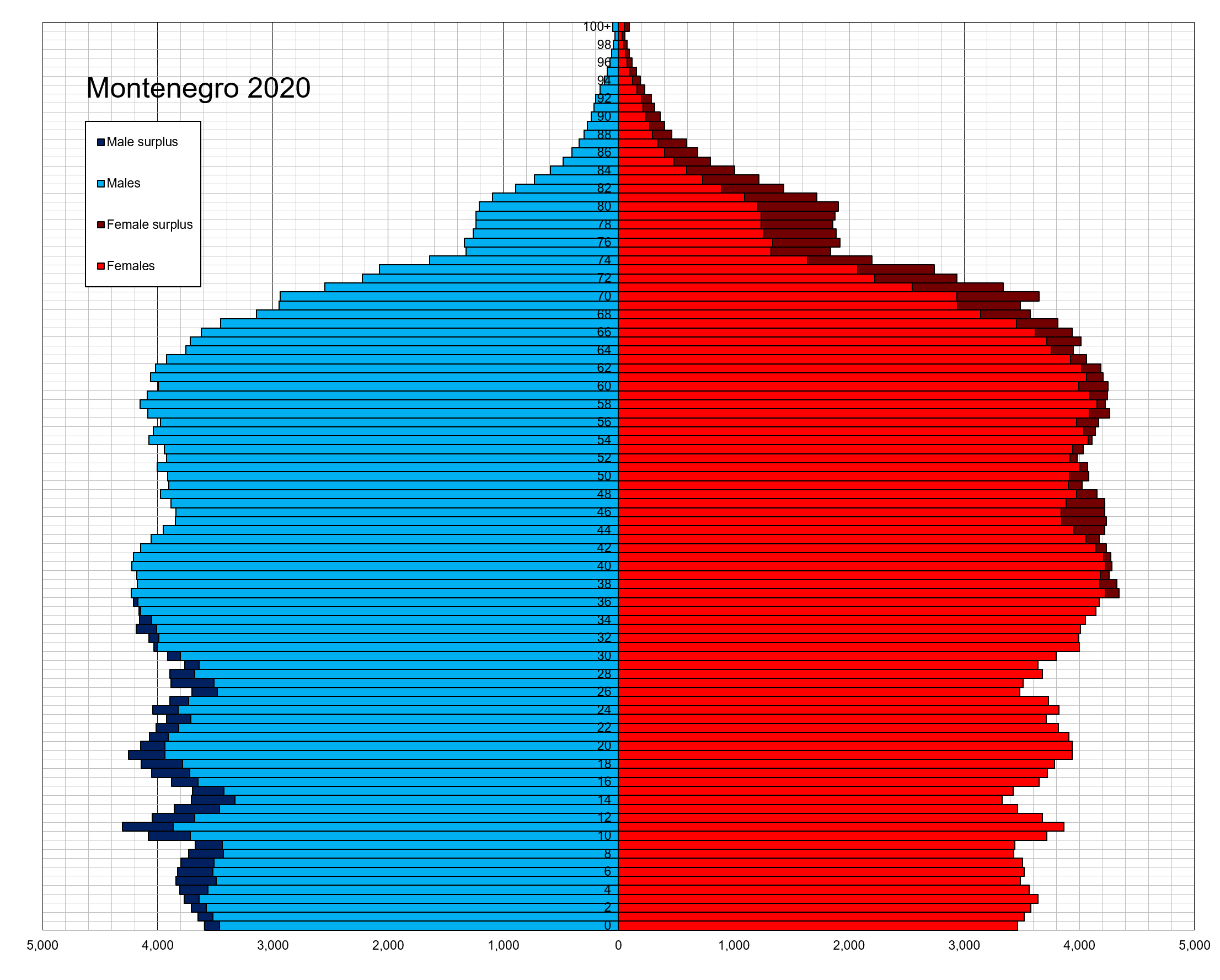
Montenegro

Netherlands

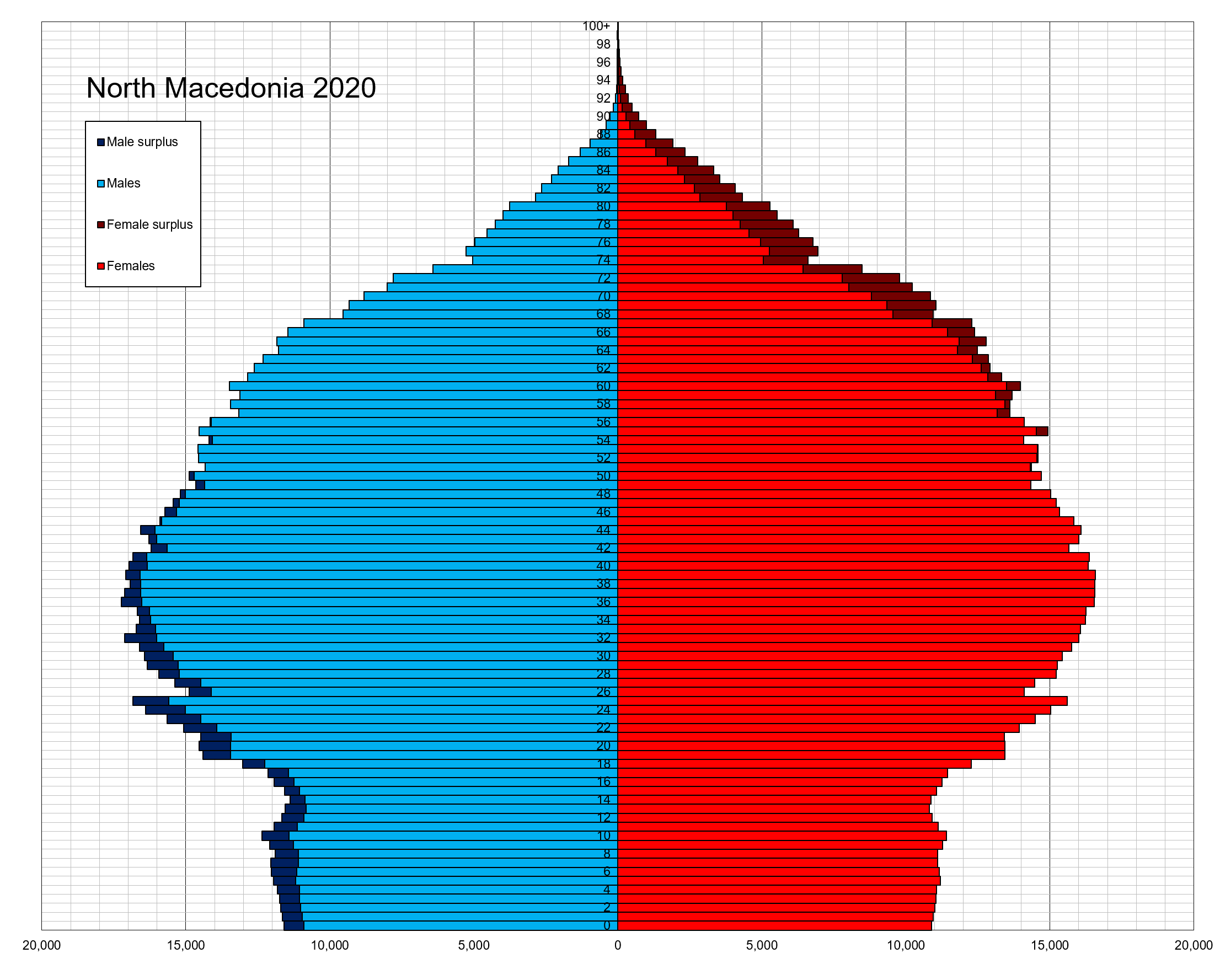
North Macedonia

Norway (2021)

Poland

Portugal (2020)

Romania

Russia

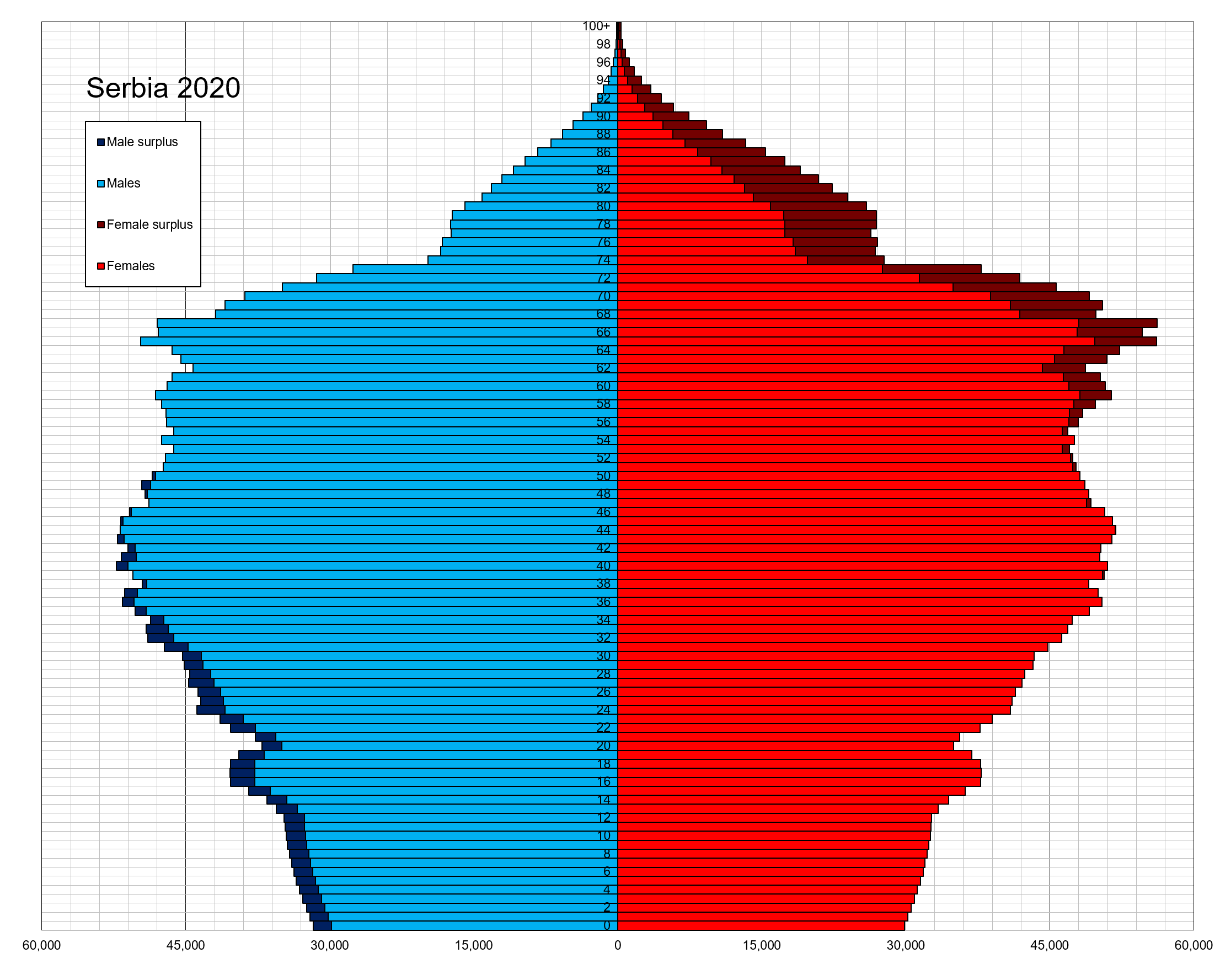
Serbia

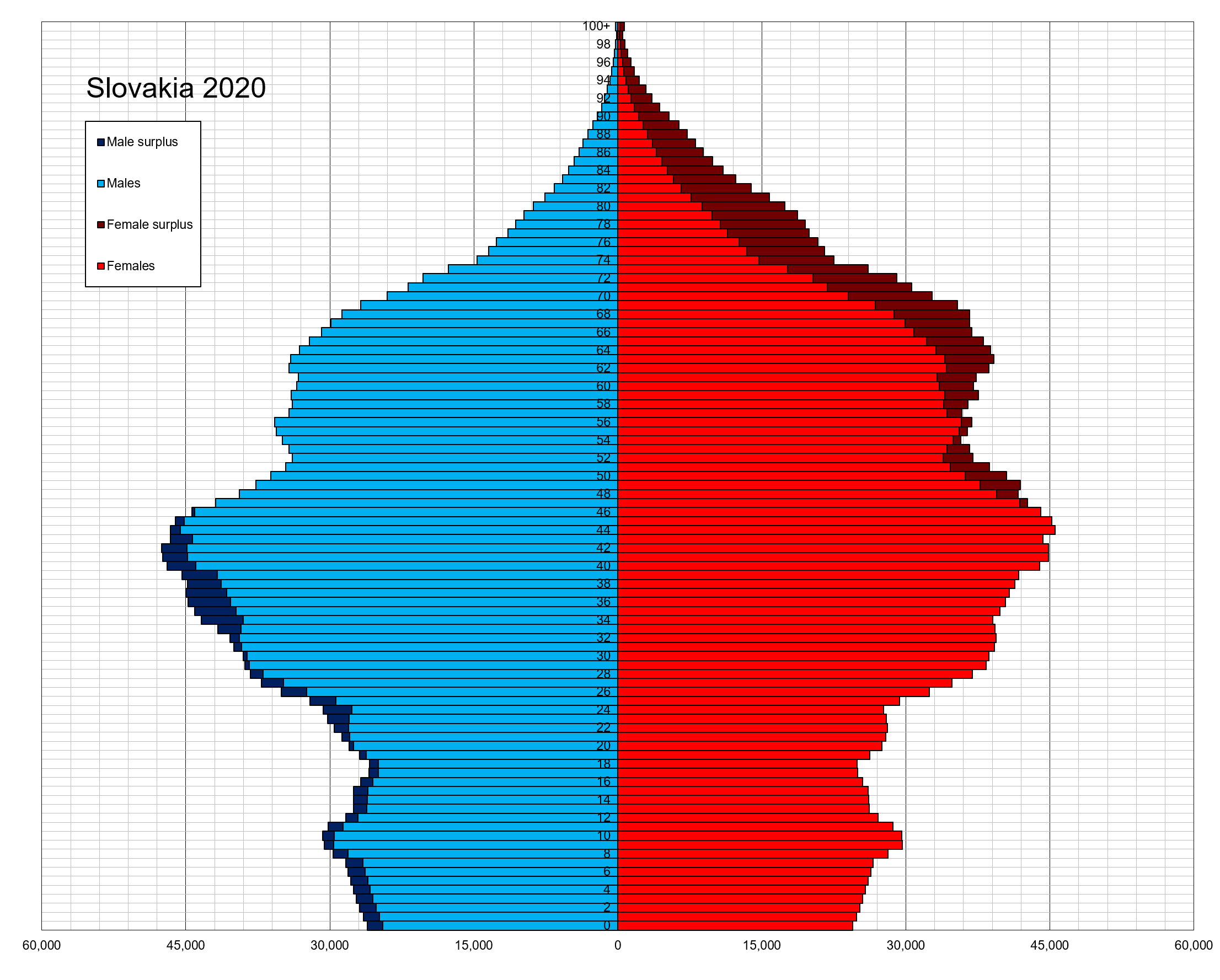
Slovakia

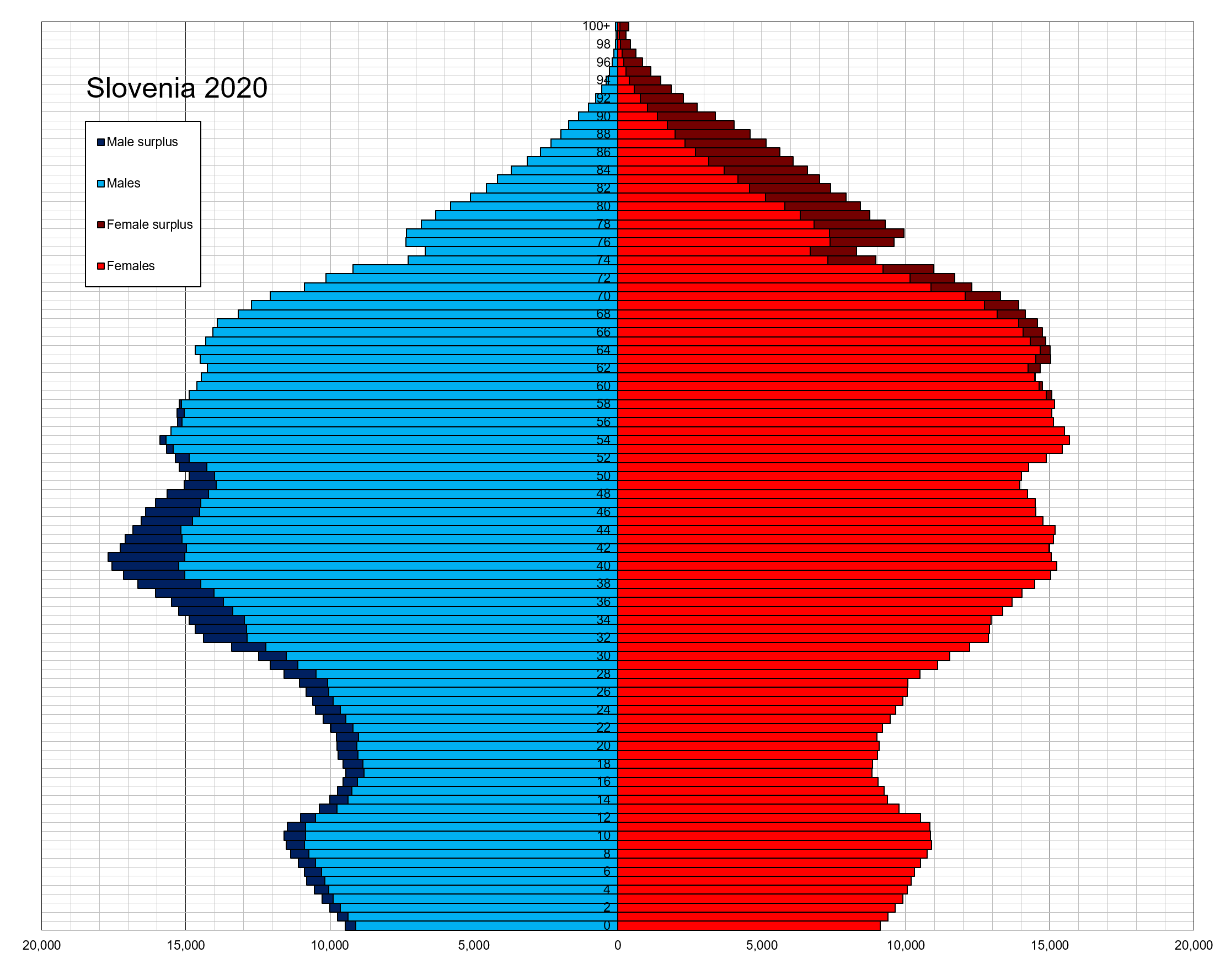
Slovenia

Spain

Sweden

Switzerland (and foreigners)

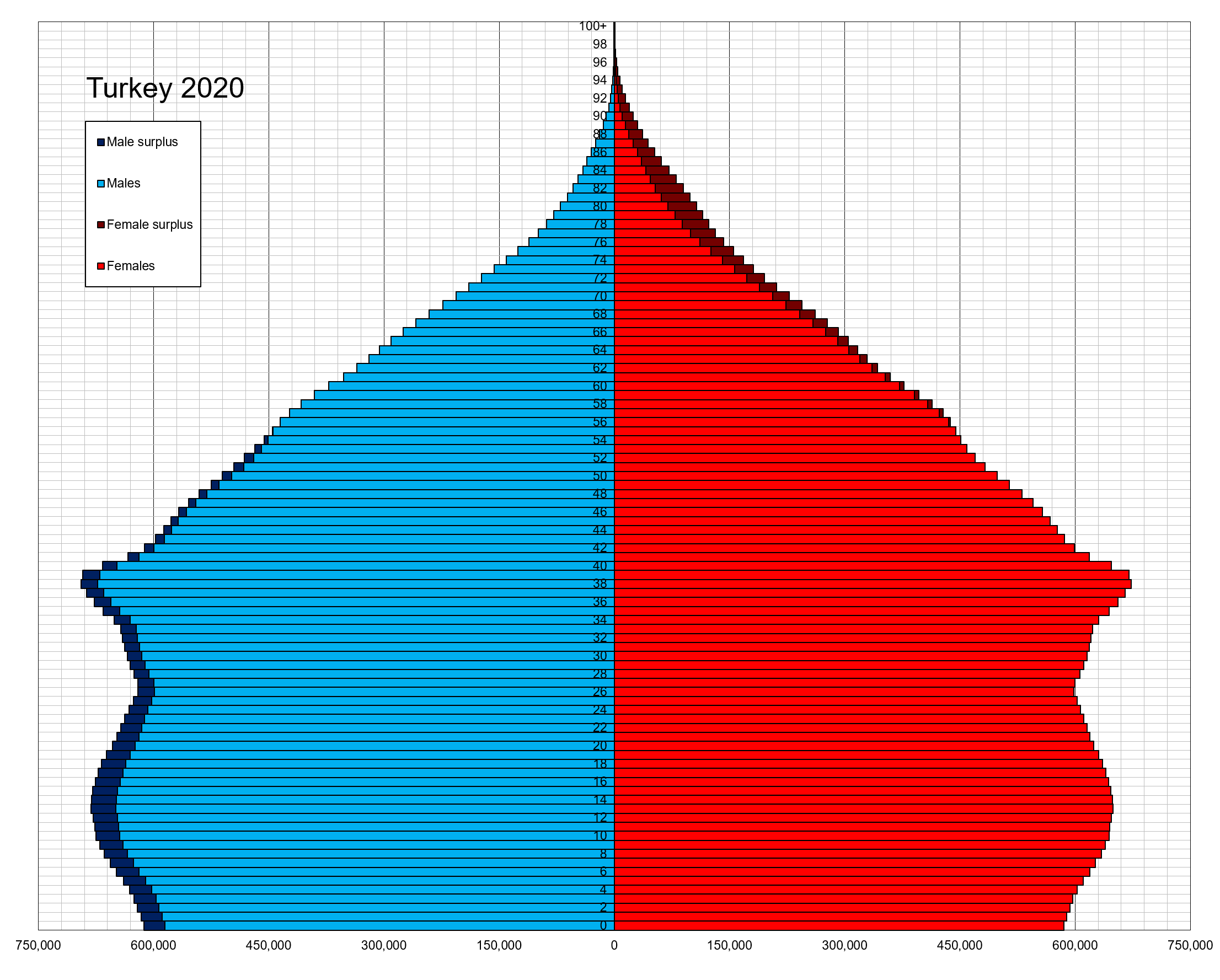
Turkey

Ukraine

United Kingdom

England

Northern Ireland

Scotland

Wales
Liechtenstein, Monaco, San Marino and Vatican City excluded due to lack of graphic

== Vital statistics ==
Birth and death rates, by year
Year	Average population	Live births	Deaths	Natural change	Crude rates (per 1000)				Total fertility rate	Life expectancy
Year	Average population	Live births	Deaths	Natural change	Births	Deaths	Natural change	Migration change	Total fertility rate	Life expectancy
1950	549,721,718	12,202,220	6,473,233	5,728,987	22.2	11.8	10.4	−1.6	2.70	62.8
1951	554,559,502	12,112,425	6,609,794	5,502,631	21.8	11.9	9.9	−0.8	2.66	62.8
1952	559,609,904	12,142,368	6,265,135	5,877,233	21.7	11.2	10.5	−0.8	2.66	64.0
1953	565,058,633	12,120,826	6,220,937	5,899,889	21.5	11.0	10.4	−0.5	2.64	64.7
1954	570,670,994	12,151,779	6,072,645	6,079,134	21.3	10.6	10.7	−0.8	2.64	65.5
1955	576,304,974	12,134,270	5,987,151	6,147,119	21.1	10.4	10.7	−0.9	2.63	66.0
1956	581,975,516	12,133,583	5,899,594	6,233,989	20.8	10.1	10.7	−0.8	2.62	66.9
1957	587,711,635	12,194,100	5,963,269	6,230,831	20.7	10.1	10.6	−0.5	2.62	66.9
1958	593,669,297	12,177,600	5,647,571	6,530,029	20.5	9.5	11.0	−0.9	2.60	68.2
1959	599,684,870	12,178,245	5,816,056	6,362,189	20.3	9.7	10.6	−0.7	2.60	68.1
1960	605,629,870	12,098,378	5,783,828	6,314,550	20.0	9.6	10.4	−0.4	2.58	68.8
1961	611,711,020	11,990,399	5,749,292	6,241,107	19.6	9.4	10.2	−0.5	2.56	69.1
1962	617,672,206	11,784,056	6,023,706	5,760,350	19.1	9.8	9.3	−0.1	2.53	68.9
1963	623,335,994	11,654,646	6,031,219	5,623,427	18.7	9.7	9.0	0	2.52	69.2
1964	628,944,878	11,467,618	5,843,514	5,624,104	18.2	9.3	8.9	−0.4	2.50	69.9
1965	634,267,606	11,141,596	6,058,752	5,082,844	17.6	9.6	8.0	−0.1	2.45	69.8
1966	639,264,461	10,950,076	6,074,808	4,875,268	17.1	9.5	7.6	0	2.42	70.0
1967	644,114,436	10,969,039	6,204,646	4,764,393	17.0	9.6	7.4	−0.4	2.42	70.0
1968	648,610,191	10,821,004	6,427,622	4,393,382	16.7	9.9	6.8	−0.4	2.38	69.9
1969	652,740,596	10,685,498	6,652,543	4,032,955	16.4	10.2	6.2	−0.4	2.33	69.6
1970	656,521,426	10,568,071	6,602,177	3,965,894	16.1	10.1	6.0	0	2.28	70.0
1971	660,476,010	10,662,541	6,675,051	3,987,490	16.1	10.1	6.0	0.5	2.27	70.1
1972	664,799,679	10,499,844	6,699,913	3,799,931	15.8	10.1	5.7	0.5	2.21	70.3
1973	668,909,022	10,322,172	6,814,598	3,507,574	15.4	10.2	5.2	0.8	2.14	70.4
1974	672,912,941	10,406,013	6,818,259	3,587,754	15.5	10.1	5.3	0.4	2.13	70.6
1975	676,770,845	10,285,047	7,009,188	3,275,859	15.2	10.4	4.8	0.5	2.07	70.5
1976	680,361,150	10,242,399	7,085,837	3,156,562	15.1	10.4	4.6	0.5	2.03	70.6
1977	683,848,710	10,171,264	7,039,667	3,131,597	14.9	10.3	4.6	0.2	1.99	70.9
1978	687,149,553	10,143,418	7,183,531	2,959,887	14.8	10.5	4.3	0.3	1.96	70.9
1979	690,287,705	10,159,933	7,268,744	2,891,189	14.7	10.5	4.2	0.4	1.95	71.0
1980	693,437,228	10,156,371	7,422,720	2,733,651	14.6	10.7	3.9	0.4	1.93	70.9
1981	696,429,190	10,053,030	7,404,116	2,648,914	14.4	10.6	3.8	0.2	1.89	71.2
1982	699,220,370	10,102,647	7,373,734	2,728,913	14.4	10.5	3.9	0.1	1.89	71.5
1983	702,014,774	10,078,184	7,562,097	2,516,087	14.4	10.8	3.6	0.4	1.87	71.5
1984	704,798,623	10,050,688	7,584,914	2,465,774	14.3	10.8	3.5	0.4	1.86	71.6
1985	707,516,287	9,969,920	7,702,883	2,267,037	14.1	10.9	3.2	0.9	1.84	71.7
1986	710,385,076	9,987,274	7,423,641	2,563,633	14.1	10.5	3.6	0.7	1.84	72.5
1987	713,465,338	9,966,304	7,407,417	2,558,887	14.0	10.4	3.6	0.6	1.84	72.7
1988	716,444,431	9,840,567	7,475,880	2,364,687	13.7	10.4	3.3	0.4	1.82	72.8
1989	719,107,883	9,495,117	7,527,904	1,967,213	13.2	10.5	2.7	0.6	1.76	72.9
1990	721,497,282	9,235,425	7,681,197	1,554,228	12.8	10.6	2.2	0.7	1.72	72.9
1991	723,602,898	8,888,909	7,796,555	1,092,354	12.3	10.8	1.5	0.8	1.66	72.9
1992	725,259,493	8,523,515	7,935,829	587,686	11.8	10.9	0.8	0.8	1.60	72.7
1993	726,441,892	8,138,793	8,412,609	−273,816	11.2	11.6	−0.4	1.4	1.53	72.1
1994	727,063,162	7,913,453	8,492,472	−579,019	10.9	11.7	−0.8	1.1	1.50	72.1
1995	727,300,408	7,663,831	8,553,348	−889,517	10.5	11.8	−1.2	1.4	1.46	72.2
1996	727,453,566	7,581,575	8,394,631	−813,056	10.4	11.5	−1.1	1.3	1.45	72.7
1997	727,566,480	7,476,674	8,240,385	−763,711	10.3	11.3	−1.0	0.8	1.43	73.2
1998	727,445,606	7,369,527	8,193,143	−823,616	10.1	11.3	−1.1	0.6	1.42	73.6
1999	727,100,016	7,264,382	8,402,774	−1,138,392	10.0	11.6	−1.6	1.4	1.40	73.4
2000	726,968,473	7,325,763	8,401,888	−1,076,125	10.1	11.6	−1.5	1.4	1.42	73.5
2001	726,878,371	7,277,594	8,364,598	−1,087,004	10.0	11.5	−1.5	1.6	1.41	73.8
2002	726,939,358	7,330,526	8,520,890	−1,190,364	10.1	11.7	−1.6	2.3	1.42	73.8
2003	727,424,988	7,442,475	8,655,471	−1,212,996	10.2	11.9	−1.7	2.7	1.45	73.8
2004	728,163,243	7,558,652	8,381,363	−822,711	10.4	11.5	−1.1	2.2	1.47	74.4
2005	728,950,486	7,568,637	8,494,391	−925,754	10.4	11.7	−1.3	2.5	1.47	74.5
2006	729,857,708	7,703,029	8,237,212	−534,183	10.6	11.3	−0.7	2.8	1.50	75.2
2007	731,393,136	7,886,129	8,187,820	−301,691	10.8	11.2	−0.4	2.9	1.54	75.6
2008	733,256,182	8,169,398	8,195,293	−25,895	11.1	11.2	0.0	2.2	1.59	75.8
2009	734,902,805	8,208,268	8,099,043	109,225	11.2	11.0	0.1	1.8	1.60	76.3
2010	736,276,813	8,227,484	8,128,387	99,097	11.2	11.0	0.1	1.7	1.61	76.5
2011	737,589,666	8,132,980	7,958,960	174,020	11.0	10.8	0.2	1.6	1.60	77.1
2012	738,907,594	8,178,804	8,078,292	100,512	11.1	10.9	0.1	1.4	1.62	77.3
2013	740,013,806	8,039,791	8,033,963	5,828	10.9	10.9	0.0	1.4	1.60	77.6
2014	741,014,147	8,067,454	7,955,740	111,714	10.9	10.7	0.2	1.3	1.62	77.9
2015	742,107,449	8,004,465	8,177,599	−173,134	10.8	11.0	−0.2	1.8	1.62	78.0
2016	743,318,582	7,950,684	8,009,194	−58,510	10.7	10.8	−0.1	1.6	1.62	78.4
2017	744,449,361	7,617,755	8,076,159	−458,404	10.2	10.8	−0.6	1.8	1.56	78.7
2018	745,359,130	7,375,157	8,112,356	−737,199	9.9	10.9	−1.0	2.1	1.53	78.8
2019	746,189,645	7,108,392	8,020,246	−911,854	9.5	10.7	−1.2	1.2	1.49	79.1
2020	746,225,356	6,938,739	9,119,281	−2,180,542	9.3	12.2	−2.9	1.5	1.47	77.7
2021	745,173,774	6,879,818	9,656,398	−2,776,580	9.2	13.0	−3.7	6.1	1.48	77.0
2022	746,964,593	6,520,637	8,811,692	−2,291,055	8.7	11.8	−3.1	1.3	1.41	78.2
2023	745,602,875	6,337,695	8,293,264	−1,955,569	8.5	11.1	−2.6	1.9	1.40	79.1
2024	745,083,824	6,345,992	8,431,000	−2,085,008	8.5	11.4	−3.0	2.1	1.40	79.5
2025(p)	744,398,832								1.41	

View source data.
View source data.
View source data.
View source data.

== Population by country ==
Population density in the European Union and the EFTA countries, along with candidate countries (2017)

According to different definitions, such as consideration of the concept of Central Europe, the following territories and regions may be subject to various other categorisations aside from geographic conventions.

Population and area of European countries/territories
Country (or territory)	Population	Area (km^{2})	Density (per km^{2})
Albania *	2,854,710	28,748	99
Andorra *	79,034	468	169
Armenia *	2,790,974	29,743	94
Austria *	8,922,082	83,871	106
Azerbaijan *	10,312,992	86,600	119
Belarus *	9,578,167	207,600	46
Belgium *	11,611,419	30,528	380
Bosnia and Herzegovina *	3,270,943	51,209	64
Bulgaria *	6,520,314	110,900	59
Croatia *	4,060,135	56,594	72
Cyprus *	1,244,188	9,251	134
Czech Republic *	10,510,751	78,866	133
Denmark *	6,032,963	43,094	140
Estonia *	1,328,701	45,227	29
Faroe Islands * (Denmark)	49,709	1,399	35.6
Finland *	5,535,992	336,852	16
France *	64,531,444	551,500	117
Georgia *	3,757,980	69,700	54
Germany *	83,408,554	357,137	234
Gibraltar * (UK)	32,669	6	5,445
Greece *	10,445,365	131,957	79
Guernsey *	65,345	63	1,037
Hungary *	9,709,786	93,026	104
Iceland *	370,335	103,000	4
Ireland *	4,986,526	69,825	71
Isle of Man *	84,263	572	147
Italy *	59,240,329	301,339	197
Jersey *	97,857	116	844
Kosovo **	1,859,203	10,887	171
Latvia *	1,873,919	64,562	29
Liechtenstein *	39,039	160	244
Lithuania *	2,786,651	65,300	43
Luxembourg *	639,321	2,586	247
Malta *	526,748	316	1,667
Moldova *	3,061,506	33,846	90
Monaco *	36,686	2	18,343
Montenegro *	627,859	13,812	45
Netherlands *	17,501,696	37,354	469
North Macedonia *	2,103,330	25,713	82
Norway *	5,403,021	323,787	17
Poland *	38,307,726	311,888	123
Portugal *	10,290,103	92,212	112
Romania *	19,328,560	238,391	81
Russia *	145,102,755	17,098,246	8
San Marino *	33,745	61	553
Serbia *	7,296,769	88,361	83
Slovakia *	5,447,622	49,036	111
Slovenia *	2,119,410	20,273	105
Spain *	47,486,935	505,992	94
Svalbard and Jan Mayen (Norway)	2,868	62,422	0
Sweden *	10,467,097	450,295	23
Switzerland *	8,691,406	41,285	211
Transnistria *	505,000	4,163	121.3
Turkey *	84,775,404	783,562	108
Ukraine *	43,531,422	603,500	72
United Kingdom *	67,281,039	242,495	277
Vatican City *	842	0.4	1,913.6
Åland (Finland)	28,666	1,580	18

* indicates link goes to article on demographics of the country (or territory), not just the country itself.

== Religion ==
Largest (non-)religious group by EU member state according to Eurobarometer survey 2019. More than 75% Catholic 50–75% Catholic Relative Catholic majority 50–75% Protestant More than 75% Orthodox 50–75% non-religious Relative non-religious majority 30% Catholic, 30% non-religious (Germany)

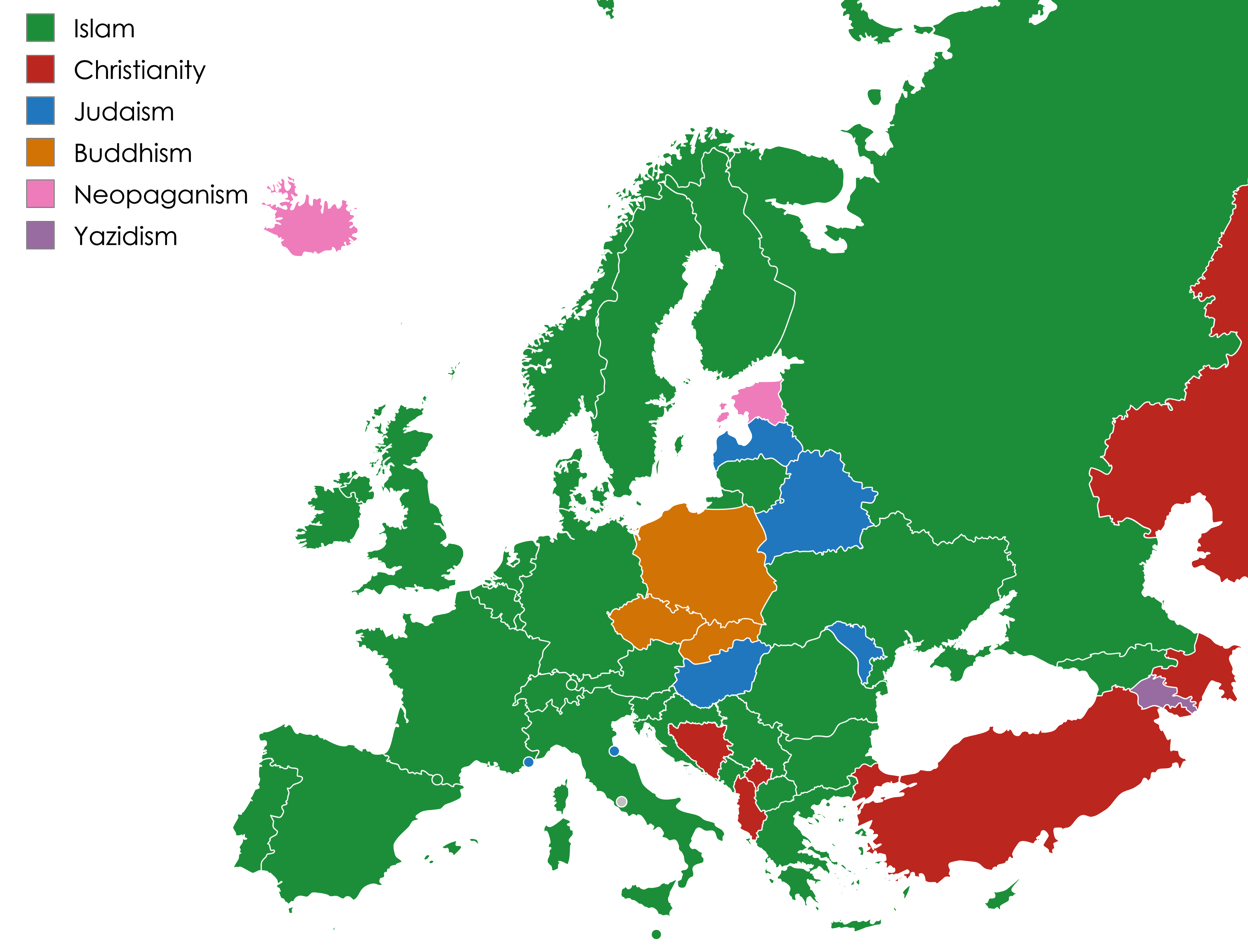
Second largest religion in European countries

Over the last several centuries, religious practice has been on the decline in a process of secularization. Several European countries have experienced a decline in church attendance as well as a decline in the number of people professing a religious belief. The 2010 Eurobarometer survey found that, on average, 51% of the citizens of the European Union that they believe there is a God, 26% believe there is some sort of spirit or life force and 20% don't believe there is any sort of spirit, God or life force. 3% declined to answer. The Eurobarometer survey must be taken with caution, however, as there are discrepancies between it and national census results. For example, in the United Kingdom, the 2001 census revealed that over 70% of the population regarded themselves as "Christians" with only 15% professing to have no religion, though the wording of the question has been criticized as "misleading" by the British Humanist Association. The 2011 census showed a dramatic reduction to less than 60% of the population regarding themselves as "Christians".

Despite its decline, Christianity is still the largest religion in Europe. According to a survey published in 2010, 76.2% of Europeans identified themselves as Christians. Catholics were the largest Christian group in Europe, accounting for more than 48% of European Christians. The second-largest Christian group in Europe was the Orthodox, who made up 32% of European Christians. And about 19% of European Christians were part of the Protestant tradition. Europe constitutes in absolute terms the world's largest Christian population. According to Scholars, in 2017, Europe's population was 77.8% Christian (up from 74.9% 1970), these changes were largely result of the collapse of Communism and switching to Christianity in the former Soviet Union and Eastern Bloc countries.

According to a 2003 study, 47% of French people declared themselves as agnostics in 2003. This situation is often called "Post-Christian Europe". A decrease in religiousness and church attendance in western Europe (especially in Belgium, the Czech Republic, Finland, France, Germany, the United Kingdom, Norway, the Netherlands and Sweden) has been noted. According to a survey published in 2012, atheists and agnostics make up about 18.2% of the European population. According to the same survey the religiously unaffiliated make up the majority of the population only in two European countries: Czech Republic (75%) and Estonia (60%).

According to another survey about Religiosity in the European Union from 2012 by Eurobarometer, Christianity was the largest religion in the Union (accounting for 72% of the total population), Catholics were with 48% the largest Christian group in the Union, Protestants made up 12%, Eastern Orthodox made up 8% and other Christians accounted for 4% of the total population. Non-believers/agnostics accounted for 16%, atheists accounted for 7% and Muslims accounted for 2%.

== Ethnicities ==
Pan and Pfeil (2004) count 87 distinct "peoples of Europe", of which 33 form the majority population in at least one sovereign state, while the remaining 54 constitute ethnic minorities. The total number of national minority populations in Europe is estimated at 105 million people, or 14% of 770 million Europeans. (including Europeans in Siberia)

The largest ethnic groups are the Russians, with 117 million, and the Germans, with 72 million. In some countries such as the United Kingdom, France and Spain, the designation of nationality may controversially take on ethnic aspects, subsuming smaller ethnic groups such as Scots, Welsh, Cornish, Northern Irish, Bretons, Catalans, and Basques, making it difficult to quantify a "British" or "French" ethnicity, for example.

There are an estimated 10 million Romani people in Europe.

== Language ==
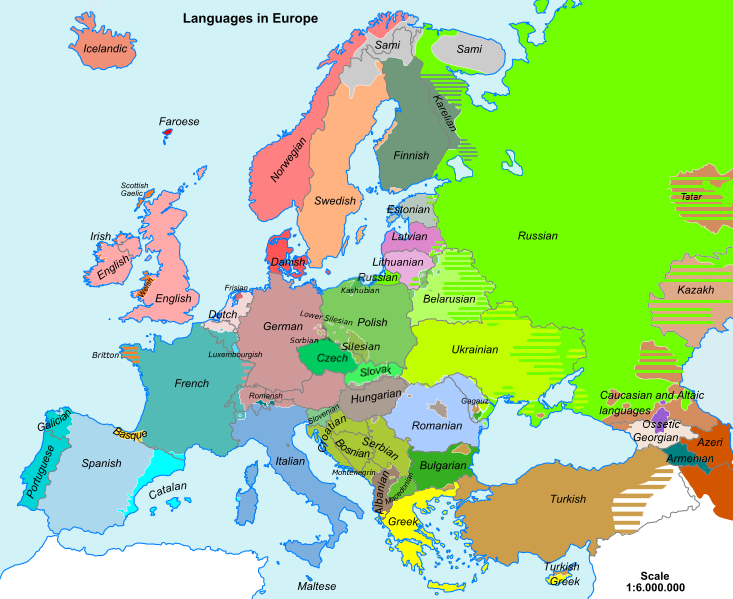
Map of Europe showing the major languages

Most of the languages of Europe belong to the Indo-European language family. This family is divided into a number of branches, including Romance, Germanic, Baltic, Slavic, Albanian, Celtic, Armenian and Greek. The Uralic languages, which include Hungarian, Finnish, Estonian, Udmurt, Mordvin and Sami also have a significant presence in Europe. The Turkic family also has several European members, while the North Caucasian and Kartvelian families which include Georgian, Circassian, Chechen and Abkhaz anong others are important in the southeastern extremity of geographical Europe. The Basque language of the western Pyrenees is an isolate unrelated to any other group, while Maltese is the only Semitic language in Europe with national language status, although Arabic, Hebrew and Neo-Aramaic dialects are spoken by migrant populations. The Kalmyk language, is a Mongolic language, spoken in Kalmykia, located directly north of the North Caucasus in Eastern Europe. The most spoken language of Europe is Russian, which belongs to the group of Slavic languages.

Languages that are not official state languages are protected in many European countries by the European Charter for Regional or Minority Languages. These can include languages spoken by relatively many people, such as Catalan and Basque in Spain, Frisian in the Netherlands, as well as languages spoken by relatively few such as Cornish, Manx and Scottish Gaelic in the United Kingdom, and Romansch in Switzerland.

== Genetic origins ==
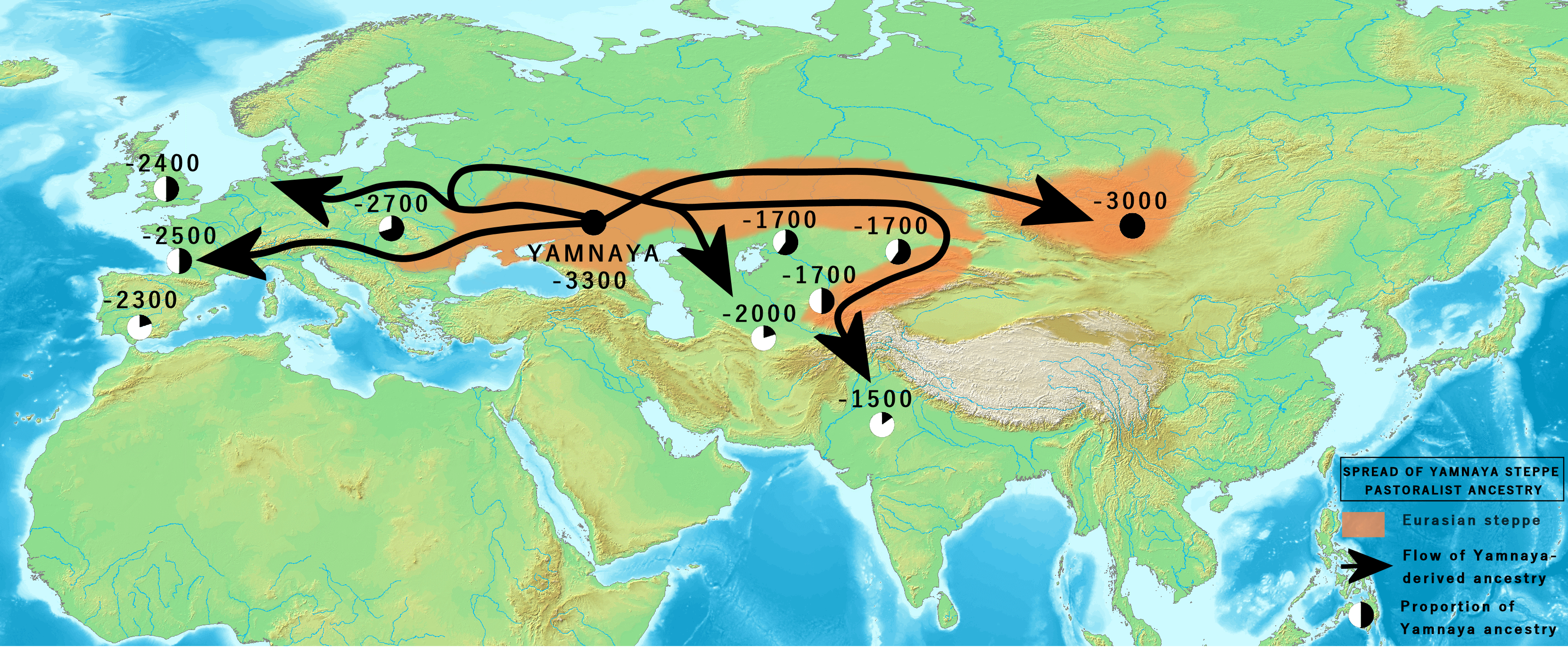
Bronze Age spread of Yamnaya Steppe pastoralist ancestry. The Yamnaya culture is identified with the late Proto-Indo-Europeans.

Homo sapiens appeared in Europe roughly 40,000 years ago, with the settlement of the Cro-Magnons, followed by European hunter-gatherers and Early European Farmers (EEF). Over the prehistoric period there was continuous settlement in Europe, notably by the immediate descendants of the Proto-Indo-Europeans who migrated west after the advent of the Neolithic Revolution.

=== Mitochondrial DNA and Y-chromosome DNA ===
Studies of mitochondrial DNA (mtDNA) have suggested substantial genetic homogeneity of European populations, with only a few geographic or linguistic isolates appearing to be genetic isolates as well. On the other hand, analyses of the Y chromosome and of autosomal diversity have shown a general gradient of genetic similarity running from the southeast to the northwest of the continent.

=== Autosomal DNA ===
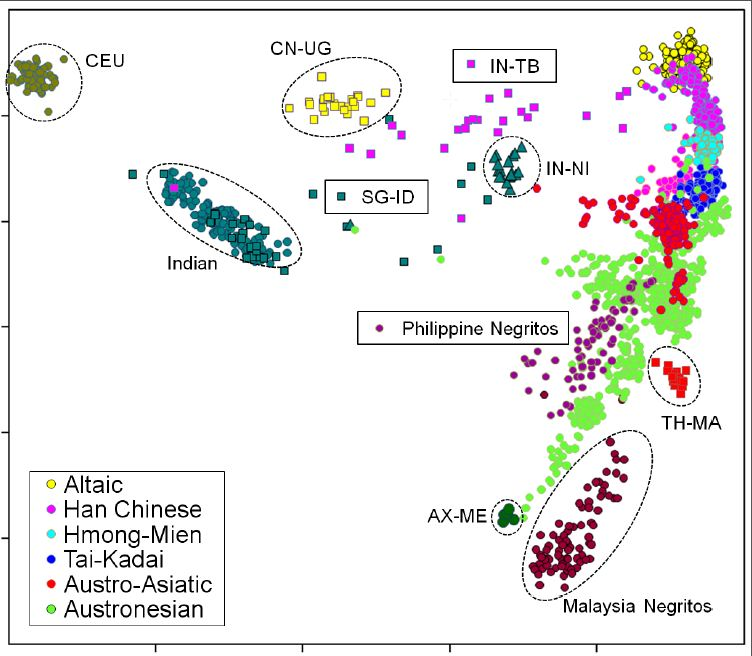
Population genomic PCA map, showing Europeans (CEU) among other sampled Eurasian populations

According to geneticist David Reich, based on ancient human genomes that his laboratory sequenced in 2016, Europeans formed from four West-Eurasian ancestral components in varying degrees: Western Hunter-Gatherers (WHG), Eastern Hunter-Gatherers (EHG), Neolithic Levant farmers and Neolithic Iranian farmers respectively.

=== Population structure ===
A study in May 2009 that examined 19 populations from Europe using 270,000 single nucleotide polymorphisms (SNPs) highlighted the genetic diversity of European populations corresponding to the northwest to southeast gradient and distinguished "several distinct regions" within Europe:

- Finland
- the Baltic states (Estonia, Latvia and Lithuania), western Russia and Poland
- Central and Western Europe
- Italy, South-Eastern Europe, Southern Russia

In this study, Fst (fixation index) was found to correlate considerably with geographic distances ranging from ≤0.0010 for neighbouring populations to 0.0230 for Southern Italy and Finland. For comparisons, pair-wise Fst of non-European samples were as follows: Europeans – Yoruba (West Africans) 0.1530; Europeans – Chinese 0.1100; Yoruba (West Africans) – Chinese 0.1900.

== See also ==
- Area and population of European countries
- Classical demography
- Demographics of the European Union
- Ethnic groups in Europe
- European diasporas
- European Union statistics
- Migration from Latin America to Europe
- List of European countries by population
- List of European countries by population growth rate
- List of European cities by population within city limits
  - List of cities in the European Union by population within city limits
- List of metropolitan areas in Europe
  - List of urban areas of the European Union
- Medieval demography
- Demographics of the world
- List of countries by fertility rate

== Notes ==
a: Continental regions as per UN categorisations/map. Depending on definitions, various territories cited below may be in one or both of Europe and Asia, or Africa.
b: Includes Transnistria, a region that has declared, and de facto achieved, independence; however, it is not recognised de jure by sovereign states.
c: Russia is considered a transcontinental country in Eastern Europe and Northern Asia. However, the population and area figures include the entire state.
d: Guernsey, the Isle of Man and Jersey are Crown Dependencies of the United Kingdom. Other Channel Islands in the Bailiwick of Guernsey include Alderney and Sark.
e: Cyprus is physiographically entirely in Western Asia, but it has strong historical and sociopolitical connections with Europe. The population and area figures refer to the entire state, including the de facto independent part Northern Cyprus.
f: Figures for Portugal include the Azores and Madeira archipelagos, both in Northern Atlantic.
g: Area figure for Serbia includes Kosovo, a province that unilaterally declared its independence from Serbia on 17 February 2008, and whose sovereign status is unclear. Population and density figures are 2010 estimates and are given without the disputed territory of Kosovo.
h: Figures for France include metropolitan France but not overseas departments and territories as they are not part of the European continent.
j: Kazakhstan is physiographically considered a transcontinental country in Central Asia (UN region) and Eastern Europe, with European territory west of the Ural Mountains and both the Ural and Emba rivers. However, area and population figures refer to the entire country.
k: Armenia is physiographically entirely in Western Asia, but it has strong historical and sociopolitical connections with Europe. The population and area figures include the entire state respectively.
m: Georgia is often considered a transcontinental country in Western Asia and Eastern Europe. However, the population and area figures include the entire state. This also includes Georgian estimates for Abkhazia and South Ossetia, two regions that have declared and de facto achieved independence. The International recognition, however, is limited.
o: The total figures for area and population includes the whole of the transcontinental countries. The precision of these figure is compromised by the ambiguous geographical extend of Europe and the lack of references for European portions of transcontinental countries.
p: Kosovo unilaterally declared its independence from Serbia on 17 February 2008. Its sovereign status is unclear. Its population is a 2007 estimate.
r: Abkhazia and South Ossetia unilaterally declared their independence from Georgia on 25 August 1990 and 28 November 1991 respectively. Their sovereign status is unclear. Population figures stated as of 2003 census and 2000 estimates respectively.
