= Demographics of Andorra =

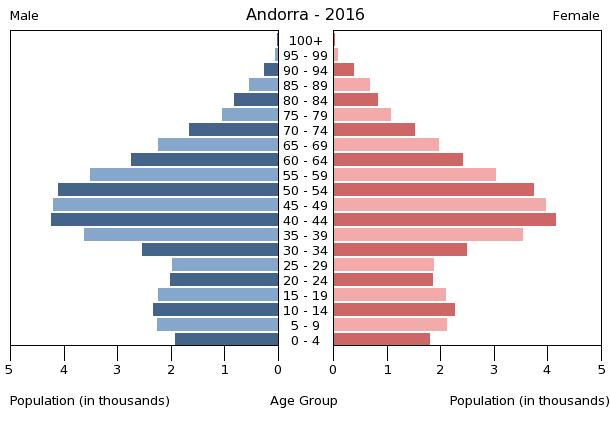
- Population pyramid of Andorra in 2016
- Population: 89,058 (2025)
- Density: 188.1/km^{2}
- Growth rate: -0.12% (2024)
- Birth rate: 6.9 births/1,000 population (2024 est.)
- Death rate: 8.1 deaths/1,000 population (2024 est.)
- Life expectancy: 83.8 years (2024 est.)
  - male: 81.6 years
  - female: 86.2 years
- Fertility rate: 1.47 children born/woman (2024 est.)
- Infant mortality: 3.3 deaths/1,000 live births (2024 est.)
- Net migration rate: 0 migrant(s)/1,000 population (2024 est.)
- Immigrant share: 59.1% (2024)

Age structure
- 0–14 years: 12%
- 15–64 years: 67.7%
- 65 and over: 20.4%

Sex ratio
- Total: 1.05 male(s)/female (2024 est.)
- At birth: 1.06 male(s)/female
- Under 15: 1.06 male(s)/female
- 15–64 years: 1.05 male(s)/female
- 65 and over: 1.03 male(s)/female

Nationality
- Nationality: Andorran
- Major ethnic: Spanish (34.3%) (2024 est., by country of birth)
- Minor ethnic: (by country of birth): 32.1% Andorrans; 10% Portuguese; 5.6% French; 18% others

Language
- Official: Catalan (44.1%) (2022 est.)
- Spoken: 40.3% Spanish; 13.5% Portuguese; 10% French; 3% English; 6.8% other

This is a demography of the population of Andorra, including population density, ethnicity, education level, health of the populace, economic status, religious affiliations and other aspects of the population.

Spaniards form the largest ethnic group in Andorra, followed by Andorrans, Portuguese, and French.

The national language of the country is Catalan, a Romance language in the Western Romance group, spoken by over 9 million people in nearby regions of Spain and France. While Catalan is the only official language, Spanish is particularly widespread, and French and Portuguese are also commonly spoken due to immigration and geographic proximity. Most residents of Andorra are multilingual, typically speaking Catalan and their native language, as a significant portion of the population was born outside the country.

The vast majority of the population lives in the seven urbanized valleys that form Andorra's political districts, the seven parròquies (parishes):

- Andorra la Vella
- Canillo
- Encamp
- Escaldes-Engordany
- La Massana
- Ordino
- Sant Julià de Lòria

55% of the population are of foreign nationality, with only 45% holding the Andorran nationality.

== Population size and structure ==
Historical populations
Year	Pop.	±% p.a.
1950	6,176	—
1960	8,392	+3.11%
1970	19,545	+8.82%
1980	35,460	+6.14%
1990	54,507	+4.39%
2000	65,844	+1.91%
2010	85,015	+2.59%
2020	82,887	−0.25%
Source: Departament d'Estadística d'Andorra

=== Population ===
The latest population figure (2026) of Andorra is 88,941.

=== Median age ===
Total: 48.8 years
Male: 48.7 years
Female: 48.8 years (2024 est.)

=== Sex ratio ===
At birth: 1.06 male(s)/female
Under 15 years: 1.06 male(s)/female
15-64 years: 1.05 male(s)/female
65 years and over: 1.03 male(s)/female
Total population: 1.05 male(s)/female (2024 est.)

=== Structure of the population ===
Population Estimates by Sex and Age Group (01.I.2021) (Population statistics are compiled from registers.):

Age group	Male	Female	Total	%
Total	39 740	38 275	78 015	100
0–4	1 315	1 235	2 550	3.27
5–9	1 816	1 789	3 605	4.62
10–14	2 146	2 029	4 175	5.35
15–19	2 100	1 973	4 073	5.22
20–24	2 314	2 005	4 319	5.54
25–29	2 464	2 174	4 638	5.95
30–34	2 654	2 513	5 167	6.62
35–39	3 012	2 962	5 974	7.66
40–44	3 384	3 418	6 802	8.72
45–49	3 717	3 645	7 362	9.44
50–54	3 555	3 323	6 878	8.82
55–59	3 293	3 045	6 338	8.12
60–64	2 544	2 354	4 898	6.28
65-69	1 860	1 745	3 605	4.62
70-74	1 442	1 402	2 844	3.65
75-79	1 024	1 028	2 052	2.63
80-84	563	740	1 303	1.67
85-89	337	508	845	1.08
90-94	158	294	452	0.58
95+	42	93	135	0.17
Age group	Male	Female	Total	Percent
0–14	5 277	5 053	10 330	13.24
15–64	29 037	27 412	56 449	72.36
65+	5 426	5 810	11 236	14.40

== Vital statistics ==
=== Births and deaths ===
From state sources:

	Average population	Live births	Deaths	Natural change	Crude birth rate (per 1000)	Crude death rate (per 1000)	Natural change (per 1000)	Fertility rate
1948	5,500	92	58	34	16.6	10.5	6.1	
1949	5,800	85	48	37	14.6	8.2	6.4	
1950	6,100	94	61	33	15.5	10.1	5.4	
1951	6,200	104	63	41	16.7	10.1	6.6	
1952	6,100	98	49	49	16.1	8.0	8.1	
1953	5,700	101	53	48	17.6	9.3	8.3	
1954	5,500	96	51	45	17.3	9.2	8.1	
1955	5,800	108	55	53	18.5	9.4	9.1	
1956	6,200	110	61	49	17.7	9.8	7.9	
1957	6,300	111	47	64	17.6	7.4	10.4	
1958	6,800	138	55	83	20.4	8.1	12.3	
1959	7,200	157	57	100	21.9	7.9	14.0	
1960	7,800	180	73	107	23.0	9.3	14.0	
1961	8,700	185	61	124	21.3	7.0	14.3	
1962	9,600	242	72	170	25.1	7.5	17.6	
1963	10,800	262	75	187	24.2	6.9	17.3	
1964	11,800	275	77	198	23.3	6.5	16.8	
1965	12,900	308	75	233	23.9	5.8	18.1	
1966	14,000	292	88	204	20.9	6.3	14.6	
1967	15,000	330	93	237	22.1	6.2	15.9	
1968	16,400	375	96	279	22.9	5.9	17.0	
1969	17,700	390	113	277	22.0	6.4	15.6	
1970	18,900	395	102	293	20.9	5.4	15.5	
1971	20,000	414	91	323	20.7	4.5	16.2	
1972	21,000	482	110	372	23.2	5.2	17.0	
1973	22,300	475	132	343	21.3	5.9	15.4	
1974	23,900	545	116	429	22.8	4.8	18.0	
1975	25,700	515	88	427	20.1	3.4	16.7	
1976	26,700	469	143	326	17.6	5.4	12.2	
1977	27,500	469	122	347	17.1	4.4	12.7	
1978	29,100	441	140	301	15.2	4.8	10.4	
1979	30,700	420	110	310	13.7	3.6	10.1	
1980	33,400	577	153	424	17.3	4.6	12.7	
1981	36,600	560	156	404	15.3	4.3	11.0	
1982	38,900	630	127	503	16.2	3.3	12.9	
1983	40,800	563	157	406	13.8	3.8	10.0	
1984	42,200	472	164	308	11.2	3.9	7.3	
1985	43,700	557	165	392	12.8	3.8	9.0	
1986	45,800	547	179	368	11.9	3.9	8.0	
1987	47,700	527	176	351	11.0	3.7	7.3	
1988	49,500	572	206	366	11.6	4.2	7.4	
1989	50,700	634	209	425	12.5	4.1	8.4	
1990	52,700	628	191	437	11.9	3.6	8.3	
1991	56,800	678	217	461	11.9	3.8	8.1	
1992	60,300	729	219	510	12.1	3.6	8.5	
1993	63,400	723	211	512	11.4	3.3	8.1	
1994	64,800	704	184	520	10.9	2.8	8.1	
1995	64,100	702	219	483	11.0	3.4	7.6	
1996	64,200	700	197	503	10.9	3.1	7.8	
1997	64,900	730	197	533	11.2	3.0	8.2	
1998	65,600	781	235	546	11.9	3.6	8.3	
1999	65,900	833	207	626	12.5	3.1	9.4	
2000	65,900	698	227	471	11.3	3.9	7.4	
2001	66,100	733	215	518	11.8	3.6	8.2	
2002	66,700	749	218	531	11.2	3.3	7.9	
2003	69,700	721	221	500	10.3	3.2	7.1	
2004	74,600	814	281	533	10.9	3.8	7.1	
2005	77,700	828	276	552	10.7	3.6	7.1	
2006	79,900	843	260	583	10.6	3.3	7.3	
2007	82,200	826	230	596	10.1	2.8	7.3	
2008	83,800	875	237	638	10.4	2.8	7.6	
2009	84,300	838	272	566	9.9	3.2	6.7	
2010	73,600	828	239	589	11.3	3.2	8.0	1.41
2011	69,772	793	275	518	11.4	3.9	7.4	1.38
2012	69,758	737	303	434	10.6	4.3	6.2	1.33
2013	69,966	637	239	398	9.1	3.4	5.7	1.18
2014	70,570	639	276	363	9.1	3.9	5.1	1.21
2015	71,732	659	282	377	9.2	3.9	5.3	1.23
2016	73,105	634	310	324	8.7	4.2	4.4	1.19
2017	74,794	588	323	265	7.9	4.3	3.5	1.13
2018	76,177	543	335	208	7.1	4.4	2.7	1.03
2019	77,543	539	301	238	7.0	3.9	3.1	1.03
2020	78,015	539	419	120	6.9	5.4	1.5	1.03
2021	79,535	503	386	117	6.3	4.9	1.4	0.97
2022	81,588	502	371	131	6.2	4.5	1.7	0.94
2023	85,101	458	357	101	5.4	4.2	1.2	0.79
2024	87,097	501	373	128	5.8	4.3	1.5	0.84
2025	89,058	508	386	122	5.7	4.3	1.4	0.83

=== Infant mortality rate ===
Total: 3.3 deaths/1,000 live births
country comparison to the world: 200
Male: 3.4 deaths/1,000 live births
Female: 3.2 deaths/1,000 live births (2024 est.)

=== Life expectancy at birth ===
Total population: 83.8 years
Country comparison to the world: 10
Male: 81.6 years
Female: 86.2 years (2024 est.)

== Ethnic groups ==
Spanish 34.3%.
Andorrans 32.1%.
Portuguese 10%.
French 5.6%.
Other 18%.
(These figures represent population by country of birth, 2024 est.)

== Languages ==
Catalan (official)
Spanish
French
Portuguese

== Religion ==
Andorra religiosity (Census 2020)
Catholic	85.5%
Other Christian	5.3%
No religion	6.9%
Others	2.3%
