= List of European countries by population growth rate =

Map of the European countries by the population growth rate in 2021 according to CIA World Factbook Growth higher than 1% Growth between 0.5% and 1% Growth between 0.0% and 0.5% Decline between 0.0% and 0.5% Decline between 0.5% and 1% Decline higher than 1% No data

The list is based on CIA World Factbook estimates for the year 2025. The list includes all members of the Council of Europe and Belarus; dependent territories and non-fully recognised states are omitted.

== List ==
Figures in the table below are based on estimates for 2025 in The World Factbook, published by the Central Intelligence Agency (CIA).

Population growth rates, 2025
World rank	Rank	Country	Annual growth (%)
20	1	Ukraine	2.42
71	2	Luxembourg	1.58
99	3	Cyprus	1.00
107	4	Iceland	0.82
110	5	Ireland	0.80
113	6	Monaco	0.76
119	7	Kosovo	0.73
122	8	Switzerland	0.72
126	9	Liechtenstein	0.68
129	10	Malta	0.65
130	11	Denmark	0.64
134	12	Faroe Islands	0.62
137	13	Norway	0.57
141	14	San Marino	0.55
145	15	Sweden	0.51
146	16	Jersey	0.51
149	17	Belgium	0.45
150	18	Isle of Man	0.41
153	19	United Kingdom	0.40
160	20	Netherlands	0.30
162	21	Austria	0.28
170	22	France	0.20
172	23	Guernsey	0.19
173	24	Gibraltar	0.16
175	25	Spain	0.12
179	26	North Macedonia	0.08
182	27	Finland	0.02
186	28	Vatican City	0.00
189	29	Czechia	-0.02
191	30	Svalbard	-0.03
193	31	Italy	-0.05
195	32	Slovakia	-0.07
200	33	Portugal	-0.11
201	34	Andorra	-0.12
202	35	Germany	-0.13
204	36	Slovenia	-0.16
206	37	Hungary	-0.29
208	38	Greece	-0.35
211	39	Belarus	-0.44
215	40	Montenegro	-0.46
216	41	Estonia	-0.47
218	42	Croatia	-0.53
219	43	Moldova	-0.57
222	44	Serbia	-0.60
223	46	Bulgaria	-0.66
224	47	Bosnia and Herzegovina	-0.67
225	48	Lithuania	-0.71
228	49	Romania	-0.86
230	50	Poland	-0.98
231	51	Albania	-1.06
234	52	Latvia	-1.27
