= Area and population of European countries =

This is a list of countries and territories in Europe by population density. Data are from the United Nations unless otherwise specified.

Azerbaijan and Georgia (along with Abkhazia and South Ossetia) are each bordered on the north by the Greater Caucasus, and have some territory north of these mountains and thus in Europe by the most common definition. These four, as well as Armenia would have more territory or all of their territory in Europe using a more expansive definition.

Some countries in the Caucasus, as well as Greenland and the geopolitical subdivisions of the island of Cyprus (Akrotiri and Dhekelia, Cyprus and Northern Cyprus) are not considered geographically European, but are listed here because of their historical and cultural connections to the continent.

There is some discussion about whether Kosovo should be recognised as a separate country. De facto it can be considered as one, but de jure recognition is not clear-cut.

== European countries and territories by population density ==
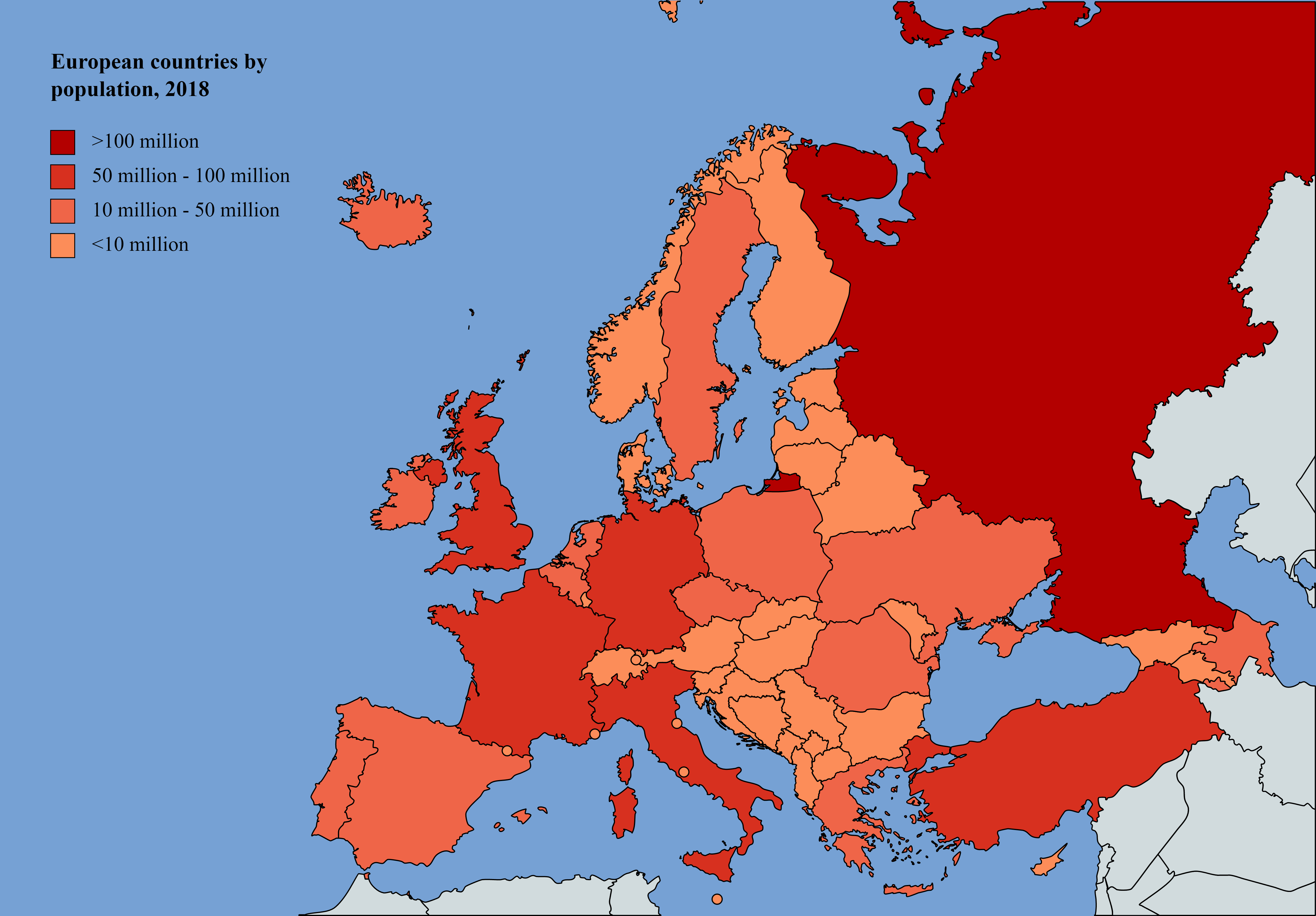
European countries by population

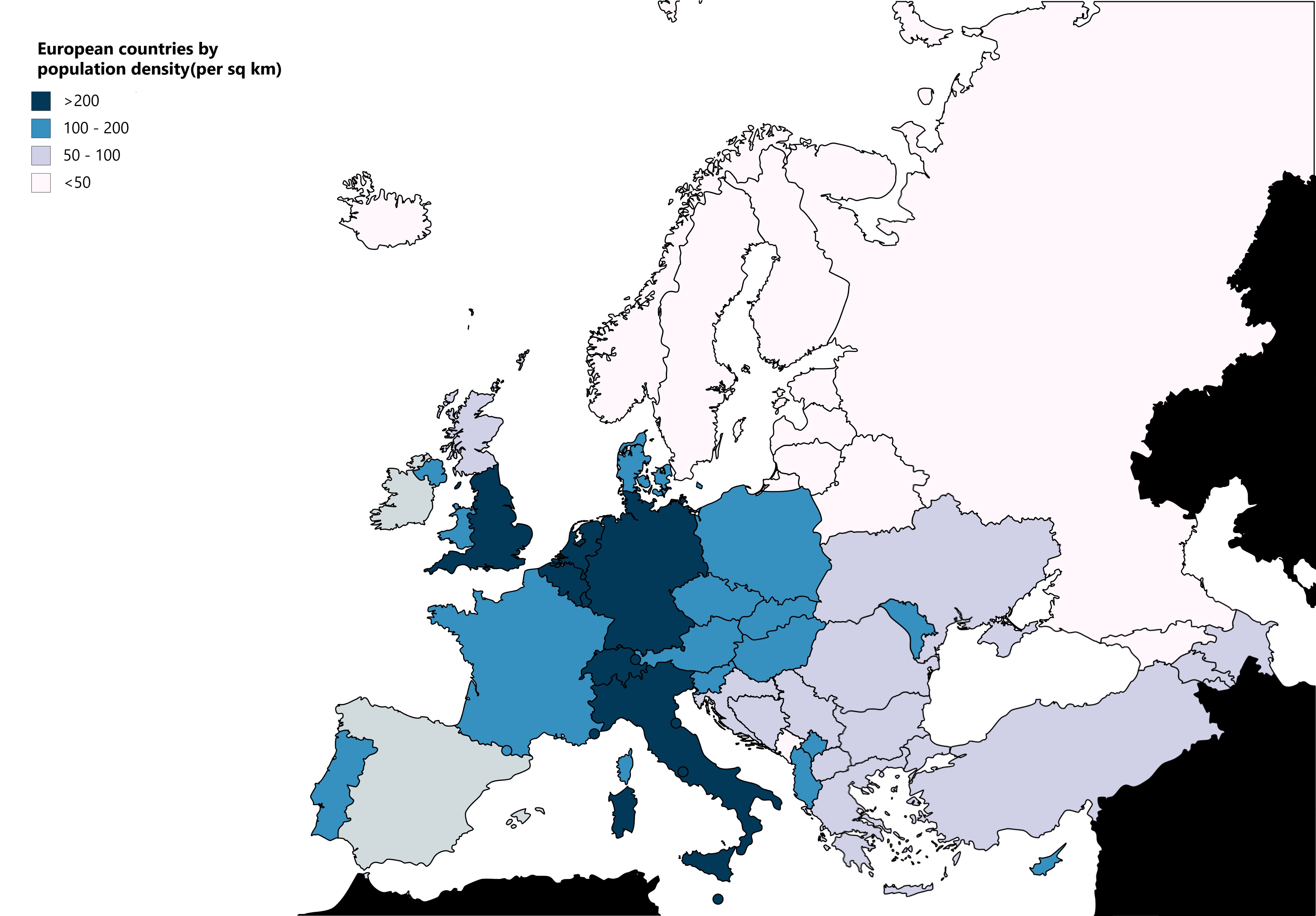
European countries by population density

- Figures are for the European portion of the given countries listed, unless given in italics. Total density and other details may be found in the associated note.

| | Country or dependency | Europe density /km^{2} | Europe population | Europe total area km^{2} | |
|---|---|---|---|---|---|
| | Europe | 72 | 724,404,000 | 10,011,000 | |
| 1 | Monaco | 18,000 | 36,298 | 2.0 | (Note: Area and population are from official figures.) |
| | Gibraltar (UK) | 4,800 | 32,688 | 6.8 | (Note: Figures are from the BBC.) |
| 2 | Malta | 1,700 | 535,065 | 315 | |
| 3 | Vatican City | 1,600 | 764 | 0.49 | (Note: Population: 764 residents regardless of citizenship, 618 citizens regardless of residence, 246 resident citizens. Area: The De Agostini Atlas Calendar listed the area of Vatican City as 0.44 km^{2} in its 1930 edition but corrected it to 0.49 km^{2} in its 1945–46 edition. The figure of 0.44 km^{2} is still widely cited by many sources despite its inaccuracy.) |
| | Jersey (UK) | 964 | 111,803 | 116 | |
| | Guernsey (UK) | 870 | 67,642 | 78 | (Note: Population estimate is from the CIA. The Bailiwick of Guernsey comprises Guernsey proper (64,037), Alderney (2,141) and Sark (562). The UN estimate of 63,544 may exclude the smaller islands.) |
| 4 | San Marino | 550 | 33,642 | 61 | |
| 5 T | Turkey | 515 | 12,231,038 | 23,757 | (Note: European Turkey or East Thrace comprises the entire provinces of Tekirdağ, Kırklareli and Edirne, as well as the portion of Istanbul Province west of the Bosporus Strait and the portion of Çanakkale Province north of the Dardanelles Strait. Overall density is 110/km^{2} when including Asia Minor or Anatolia (98/km^{2}).) |
| 6 T | Netherlands | 424 | 17,618,299 | 41,543 | (Note: Density is 422/km^{2} when including the Caribbean Netherlands (91/km^{2}).) |
| 7 | Belgium | 383 | 11,686,140 | 30,528 | |
| 8 | United Kingdom | 277 | 67,736,802 | 244,376 | (Note: Constituent countries have density 434/km^{2} (England), 141/km^{2} (Northern Ireland), 70/km^{2} (Scotland) and 150/km^{2} (Wales).) |
| 9 | Luxembourg | 253 | 654,768 | 2,586 | |
| 10 | Liechtenstein | 247 | 39,585 | 160 | |
| 11 | Germany | 233 | 83,294,633 | 357,581 | |
| 12 | Switzerland | 213 | 8,796,669 | 41,291 | |
| 13 T | Italy | 195 | 58,769,380 | 301,958 | (Note: Excluding the African islands of Pantelleria (87/km^{2}) and Lampedusa e Linosa (255/km^{2}). Including these islands, density remains at 195/km^{2}.) |
| 14 | Andorra | 171 | 80,088 | 468 | |
| | Kosovo | 153 | 1,663,595 | 10,910 | (Note: A partially recognized state also claimed by Serbia. Area is from official figures.) |
| | Isle of Man (UK) | 148 | 84,710 | 572 | |
| 15 T | Denmark | 139 | 6,001,008 | 42,947 | (Note: Excludes the Faroe Islands and Greenland. Overall density is 2.5/km^{2} when including those two.) |
| 16 | Czech Republic | 133 | 10,495,295 | 78,871 | |
| 17 | Poland | 131 | 41,026,068 | 312,679 | |
| 18 T | France | 121 | 65,823,112 | 543,941 | (Note: Mainland France (122/km^{2}) and Corsica (39/km^{2}) comprise European France or Metropolitan France. Overall density is 107/km^{2} when including Overseas departments (24/km^{2}).) |
| 19 | Slovakia | 118 | 5,795,199 | 49,035 | |
| 20 T | Portugal | 110 | 10,092,297 | 91,421 | (Note: Excluding Madeira (313/km^{2}). Overall density is 112/km^{2}.) |
| 21 | Hungary | 109 | 10,156,239 | 93,025 | |
| 22 | Austria | 107 | 8,958,961 | 83,878 | |
| 23 | Slovenia | 105 | 2,119,675 | 20,273 | |
| 24 | Moldova | 102 | 3,435,931 | 33,847 | |
| 25 | Albania | 99 | 2,832,439 | 28,748 | |
| 26 T | Spain | 98 | 49,801,559 | 498,485 | (Note: Excluding Ceuta (4,514/km^{2}), Melilla (7,013/km^{2}), and the Canary Islands (290/km^{2}). Overall density is 98/km^{2}.) |
| 27 | Serbia | 92 | 7,149,077 | 77,589 | (Note: Area is from official figures, but excluding Kosovo. UN population figure also excludes Kosovo.) |
| | Transnistria | 88 | 364,986 | 4,163 | (Note: De facto state with limited recognition. Internationally recognized as part of Moldova.) |
| 28 | Romania | 83 | 19,892,812 | 238,298 | |
| 29 | North Macedonia | 81 | 2,085,679 | 25,713 | |
| 30 | Greece | 78 | 10,341,277 | 131,957 | |
| 31 T | Azerbaijan | 78 | 543,800 | 6,960 | (Note: The Guba-Khachmaz Economic Region comprises Azerbaijan's land north of the Caucasus. Some definitions of the Europe-Asia border place more of Azerbaijan in Europe. Overall density is 117/km^{2}.) |
| 32 | Ireland | 72 | 5,056,935 | 69,825 | |
| 33 | Ukraine | 72 | 43,649,785 | 603,549 | (Note: Includes Crimea (87/km^{2}) and other territory annexed by Russia but internationally recognized as part of Ukraine.) |
| 34 | Croatia | 71 | 4,008,617 | 56,594 | |
| 35 | Bosnia and Herzegovina | 63 | 3,210,848 | 51,209 | |
| 36 | Bulgaria | 61 | 6,687,717 | 110,372 | |
| 37 | Belarus | 46 | 9,498,238 | 207,600 | |
| 38 | Montenegro | 45 | 626,485 | 13,888 | |
| 39 | Lithuania | 42 | 2,718,352 | 65,286 | |
| | Faroe Islands (Denmark) | 38 | 53,270 | 1,393 | (Note: Integral part of the Kingdom of Denmark. Classified as a territory by the ISO 3166-1.) |
| 40 | Estonia | 29 | 1,322,766 | 45,399 | |
| 41 | Latvia | 28 | 1,830,212 | 64,594 | |
| 42 T | Russia | 27 | 107,630,419 | 3,952,550 | (Note: Comprising European Russia. Excludes annexations that are internationally recognized as part of Ukraine. Overall density is 8.5/km^{2} when including North Asia (2.8/km^{2}).) |
| 43 | Sweden | 24 | 10,612,086 | 438,574 | |
| | Åland (Finland) | 19 | 30,129 | 1,583 | (Note: An integral but autonomous region of Finland. Classified as a territory by the ISO 3166-1.) |
| 44 | Norway | 17 | 5,474,360 | 323,772 | (Note: Excludes Svalbard.) |
| 45 | Finland | 16 | 5,545,475 | 336,884 | (Note: Excludes Åland.) |
| 46 T | Kazakhstan | 5.7 | 840,000 | 148,000 | (Note: European portion is about 5% of total area and 4% of total population, with the rest in Central Asia. Nine districts are entirely in Europe, but the Ural river runs through the middle of four districts (Akzhaik, Inder, Makhambet, and Atyrau). Value given is a point estimate between entirely excluding (4.8/km^{2}) or including (6.2/km^{2}) these four districts. Overall density is 7.2/km^{2}.) |
| 47 | Iceland | 3.6 | 375,319 | 103,000 | |
| | Svalbard (Norway) | 0.04 | 2,530 | 62,045 | (Note: Area figure is from the CIA. An integral part of Norway. Classified as a territory by the ISO 3166-1, which groups it with the uninhabited Jan Mayen (377 km^{2}).) |
| C | Abkhazia | 28 | (244,236) | (8,665) | (Note: An unknown portion may lie north of the Caucasus, so total figures are given. De facto state with limited recognition. Internationally recognized as part of Georgia.) |
| 48 T | Georgia | 53 | (3,728,282) | (69,700) | (Note: Approximately 3,040 km^{2} lies north of the Caucasus with an unknown population, so total figures are given. Excluding Abkhazia and South Ossetia. Some definitions place the Europe-Asia border inside of Georgia.) |
| C | South Ossetia | 14 | (56,520) | (3,900) | (Note: An unknown portion may lie north of the Caucasus, so total figures are given. De facto state with limited recognition. Internationally recognized as part of Georgia.) |
| C | Akrotiri and Dhekelia (UK) | 72 | (18,195) | (254) | (Note: Culturally but often not geographically in Europe, so total figures are given. Part of the island of Cyprus.) |
| 49 C | Armenia | 93 | (2,777,971) | (29,743) | (Note: Culturally but often not geographically in Europe, so total figures are given.) |
| 49 C | Cyprus | 99 | (918,100) | (9,251) | (Note: Culturally but often not geographically in Europe, so total figures are given. Not including Northern Cyprus or Akrotiri and Dhekelia.) |
| C | Greenland (Denmark) | 0.03 | (56,643) | (2,166,086) | (Note: Culturally tied to Europe but not a geographic part of it, so total figures are given. Integral part of the Kingdom of Denmark. Classified as a territory by the ISO 3166-1.) |
| C | Northern Cyprus | 114 | (382,836) | (3,355) | (Note: Culturally but often not geographically in Europe, so total figures are given. Part of the island of Cyprus and claimed by the state of Cyprus.) |

== See also ==
- European Union statistics
- List of countries by population density
- List of European countries by area
- List of European countries by population
