= List of European countries by area =

Below is a list of European countries and dependencies by area in Europe. As a continent, Europe's total geographical area is about 10 million square kilometres. Transcontinental countries are ranked according to the size of their European part only. Inland water is included in area numbers.

== Relative sizes ==
European countries vary in area over many orders of magnitude, ranging from Russia which covers almost 4000000 km^{2} of territory within Europe, to Vatican City, which has a total area of less than 1 km^{2}:

== List of European countries and dependencies by area ==
Figures are from the United Nations unless otherwise specified.

	Country or dependency	% total	Europe area		
	Country or dependency	% total	km^{2}	mi^{2}	
–	Europe	100%	10,014,000	3,866,000	
1 K	Russia	39.5%	3,952,550	1,526,090	(Note: Figure given is for European Russia. Excludes annexations that are internationally recognized as part of Ukraine. Total area is 17,035,650 km^{2} when including Siberia or North Asia (13,083,100 km^{2}).)
2	Ukraine	6.0%	603,549	233,032	(Note: Includes Crimea (26,945 km^{2}) and other territory annexed by Russia but internationally recognized as part of Ukraine. 115,440 km^{2} or 19% occupied by the Russian Federation as of 22 July 2025.)
3 T	France	5.4%	543,941	210,017	(Note: Mainland France (535,261 km^{2}) and Corsica (8,680 km^{2}) comprise European France or Metropolitan France. Total area is 633,109 km^{2} when including Overseas departments (89,168 km^{2}), and 672,051 km^{2} when including the Overseas Collectivities, Clipperton Island and the French Southern and Antarctic Lands (excluding Terre Adelie in Antarctica).)
4 T	Spain	5.0%	498,485	192,466	(Note: Excludes Ceuta (19 km^{2}), Melilla (12 km^{2}), and the Canary Islands (7,493 km^{2}). Total area is 506,009 km^{2}.)
5	Sweden	4.4%	438,574	169,334	
6	Norway	3.8%	385,207	148,729	(Note: Includes Svalbard and Jan Mayen.)
7	Germany	3.6%	357,581	138,063	
8	Finland	3.4%	336,884	130,072	(Note: Excludes Åland.)
9	Poland	3.1%	312,679	120,726	
10 T	Italy	3.0%	301,958	116,587	(Note: Excludes the African islands of Pantelleria (25 km^{2}) and Lampedusa e Linosa (85 km^{2}). Total area including these is 302,068 km^{2}.)
11	United Kingdom	2.4%	244,381	94,356	(Note: Areas of constituent countries are 130,462 km^{2} (England), 14,333 km^{2} (Northern Ireland), 78,803 km^{2} (Scotland) and 20,782 km^{2} (Wales). Figures may not include coastal water.)
12	Romania	2.4%	238,298	92,007	
13	Belarus	2.1%	207,600	80,200	
14 K	Kazakhstan	1.5%	148,000	57,000	(Note: European portion is about 5% of total area, with the rest in Central Asia. Nine districts are entirely in Europe, but the Ural river runs through the middle of four districts (Akzhaik, Inder, Makhambet, and Atyrau). Value given is a point estimate between entirely excluding (122,176 km^{2}) or including (174,814 km^{2}) these four districts. Overall area is 2,724,902 km^{2}.)
15 T	Greece	1.3%	131,957	50,949	(Note: Includes the islands just off the coast of Asia Minor, such as Rhodes, Kos, Samos, Chios, Lesbos, Kastellorizo, Strongyli Megistis, and Ro.)
16	Bulgaria	1.1%	110,994	42,855	
17	Iceland	1.0%	103,000	40,000	
18	Hungary	0.9%	93,025	35,917	
19 T	Portugal	0.9%	91,424	35,299	(Note: Excludes Madeira (801 km^{2}). Total area is 92,225 km^{2}.)
20	Austria	0.8%	83,878	32,385	
21	Czech Republic	0.8%	78,871	30,452	
22	Serbia	0.8%	77,589	29,957	(Note: Area is from official figures, but excludes Kosovo.)
23	Ireland	0.7%	69,825	26,960	
24	Lithuania	0.7%	65,286	25,207	
25	Latvia	0.6%	64,594	24,940	
26	Croatia	0.6%	56,594	21,851	
27	Bosnia and Herzegovina	0.5%	51,209	19,772	
28	Slovakia	0.5%	49,035	18,933	
29	Estonia	0.5%	45,399	17,529	
30 T	Denmark	0.4%	42,947	16,582	(Note: Excludes the Faroe Islands and Greenland)
31 T	Netherlands	0.4%	41,543	16,040	(Note: Area is 41,865 km^{2} when including the Caribbean Netherlands (322 km^{2}).)
32	Switzerland	0.4%	41,291	15,943	
33	Moldova	0.3%	33,847	13,068	
34	Belgium	0.3%	30,528	11,787	
35	Albania	0.3%	28,748	11,100	
36	North Macedonia	0.3%	25,713	9,928	
37 K	Turkey	0.2%	23,757	9,173	(Note: European Turkey or East Thrace comprises the entire provinces of Tekirdağ, Kırklareli and Edirne, as well as the portion of Istanbul Province west of the Bosporus Strait and the portion of Çanakkale Province north of the Dardanelles Strait. Total area is 769,734 km^{2} when including Asia Minor or Anatolia (745,978 km^{2}).)
38	Slovenia	0.2%	20,273	7,827	
39	Montenegro	0.1%	13,888	5,362	
–	Kosovo	0.1%	10,910	4,210	(Note: A partially recognized state also claimed by Serbia. Area is from official figures.)
40 K	Azerbaijan	0.08%	8,630	3,330	(Note: European Azerbaijan comprises Guba-Khachmaz Economic Region and Khizi District, which are considered as Azerbaijan's land north of the Caucasus. Some definitions of the Europe-Asia border place more of Azerbaijan in Europe. Total area is 86,600 km^{2}.)
–	Transnistria		4,163	1,607	(Note: De facto state with limited recognition. Internationally recognized as part of Moldova.)
41 K	Georgia	0.03%	3,040	1,170	(Note: The historically defined regions of Khevi, Khevsureti and Tusheti compose Georgia's area north of the Greater Caucasus. Some definitions place the Europe-Asia border inside of Georgia. Total area is 69,700 km^{2}.)
42	Luxembourg	0.03%	2,586	998	
–	Åland (Finland)	0.02%	1,583	611	(Note: An integral but autonomous region of Finland. Classified as a territory by the ISO 3166-1.)
–	Faroe Islands (Denmark)	0.01%	1,393	538	(Note: An integral part of the Kingdom of Denmark. Classified as a territory by the ISO 3166-1)
–	Isle of Man (UK)	0.006%	572	221	
43	Andorra	0.005%	468	181	
44	Malta	0.003%	315	122	
45	Liechtenstein	0.002%	160	62	
–	Jersey (UK)	0.001%	116	45	
–	Guernsey (UK)	0.001%	78	30	
46	San Marino	0.001%	61	24	
–	Gibraltar (UK)	0%	7	2.7	(Note: Figures are from the BBC.)
47	Monaco	0%	2	0.77	(Note: Area and population are from official figures.)
48	Vatican City	0%	0.49	0.19	(Note: The De Agostini Atlas Calendar listed the area of Vatican City as 0.44 km^{2} in its 1930 edition but corrected it to 0.49 km^{2} in its 1945–46 edition. The figure of 0.44 km^{2} is still widely cited by many sources despite its inaccuracy.)
– C	Greenland (Denmark)	0%	2,166,086	836,330	(Note: Culturally tied to Europe but not a geographic part of it, so total figures are given. An integral part of the Kingdom of Denmark. Classified as a territory by the ISO 3166-1)
49 C	Armenia	0%	29,743	11,484	(Note: Culturally but often not geographically in Europe, so total figures are given.)
50 C	Cyprus	0%	9,251	3,572	(Note: Culturally but often not geographically in Europe, so total figures are given. Does not include Northern Cyprus or Akrotiri and Dhekelia.)
– C	Abkhazia	0%	8,665	3,346	(Note: An unknown portion may lie north of the Caucasus, so total figures are given. De facto state with limited recognition. Internationally recognized as part of Georgia.)
– C	South Ossetia	0%	3,885	1,500	(Note: An unknown portion may lie north of the Caucasus, so total figures are given. De facto state with limited recognition. Internationally recognized as part of Georgia.)
– C	Northern Cyprus	0%	3,355	1,295	(Note: Culturally but often not geographically in Europe, so total figures are given. Part of the island of Cyprus and claimed by the state of Cyprus.)
– C	Akrotiri and Dhekelia (UK)	0%	254	98	(Note: Culturally but often not geographically in Europe, so total figures are given. Part of the island of Cyprus.)

== Definition ==
Europe and Asia are contiguous with each other; thus, the exact boundary between them is not clearly defined, and often follows historical, political, and cultural definitions, rather than geographical.

Map of Europe, showing one of the most commonly used continental boundaries (Note: The map shows one of the most commonly accepted delineations of the geographical boundaries of Europe, as used by National Geographic and Encyclopædia Britannica. Whether countries are considered in Europe or Asia can vary in sources, for example in the classification of the CIA World Factbook or that of the BBC. Certain countries in Europe, such as France, have territories lying geographically outside Europe, but which are nevertheless considered integral parts of that country.)

Legend:

Blue = Contiguous transcontinental countries
Green = Sometimes considered European due to culture, politics, economy and history, but geographically outside Europe's boundaries

== See also ==
- Area and population of European countries
- List of countries and dependencies by area
- List of European countries by population
- European microstates
