= Orlik, Atyrau Region =

Orlik Өрлік
- Village
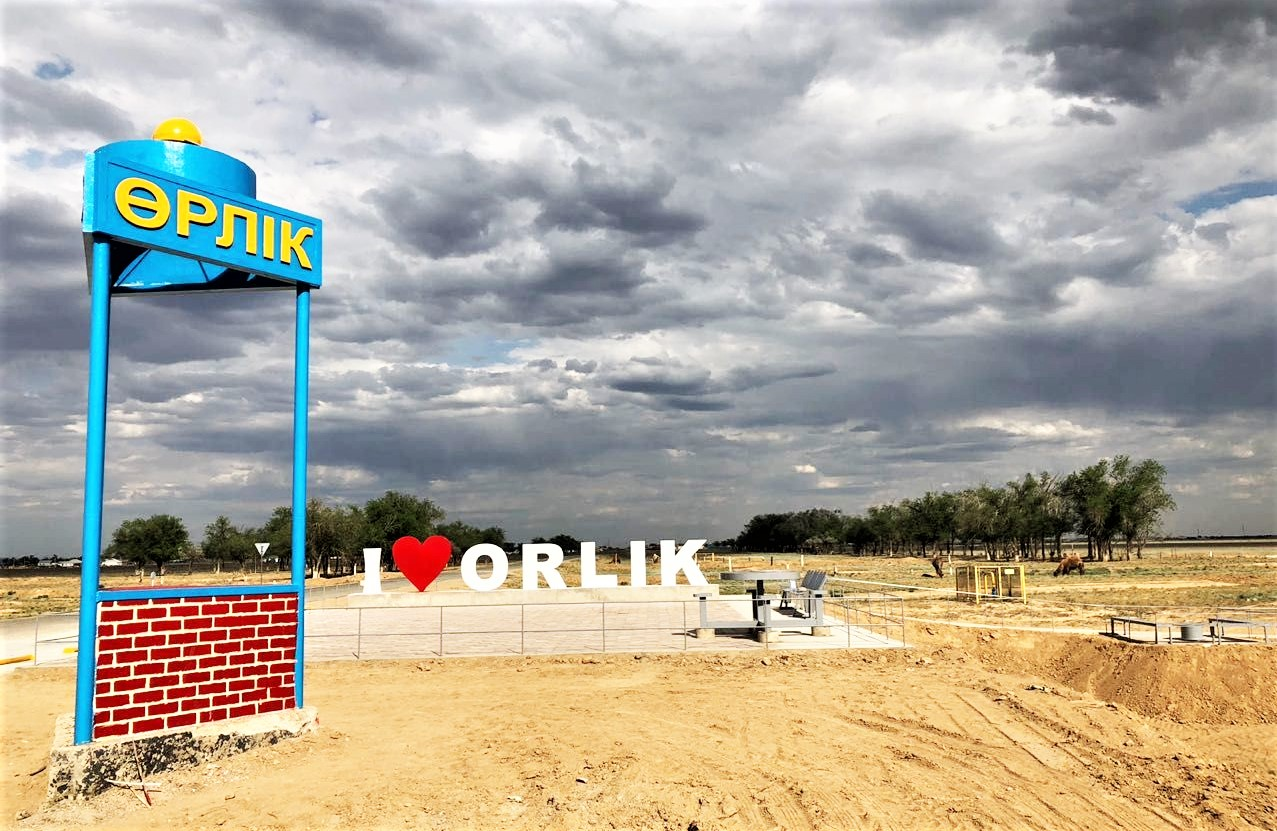

- Location within Kazakhstan
- Coordinates: 48°16′03″N 51°31′27″E
- Country: Kazakhstan
- Region: Atyrau Region
- District: Inder District

Population (2009)
  - Total: 2,741
- Time zone: UTC+5 (UTC + 5)
- Post code: 060206

Orlik (Kazakh: Өрлік), (Russian: Орлик) is a village in western Kazakhstan. It is the administrative center of Olrik Rural District (KATO code - 234047100), Inder District, Atyrau Region. Population: 2,741 (2009 census results); 2,598 (1999 census results).

== Geography ==
Olrik is located on the right bank of the Ural River. The Bagyrlai flows about 25 km (16 mi) to the west.
