= Inder (lake) =

Salt lake in Kazakhstan

- Индер
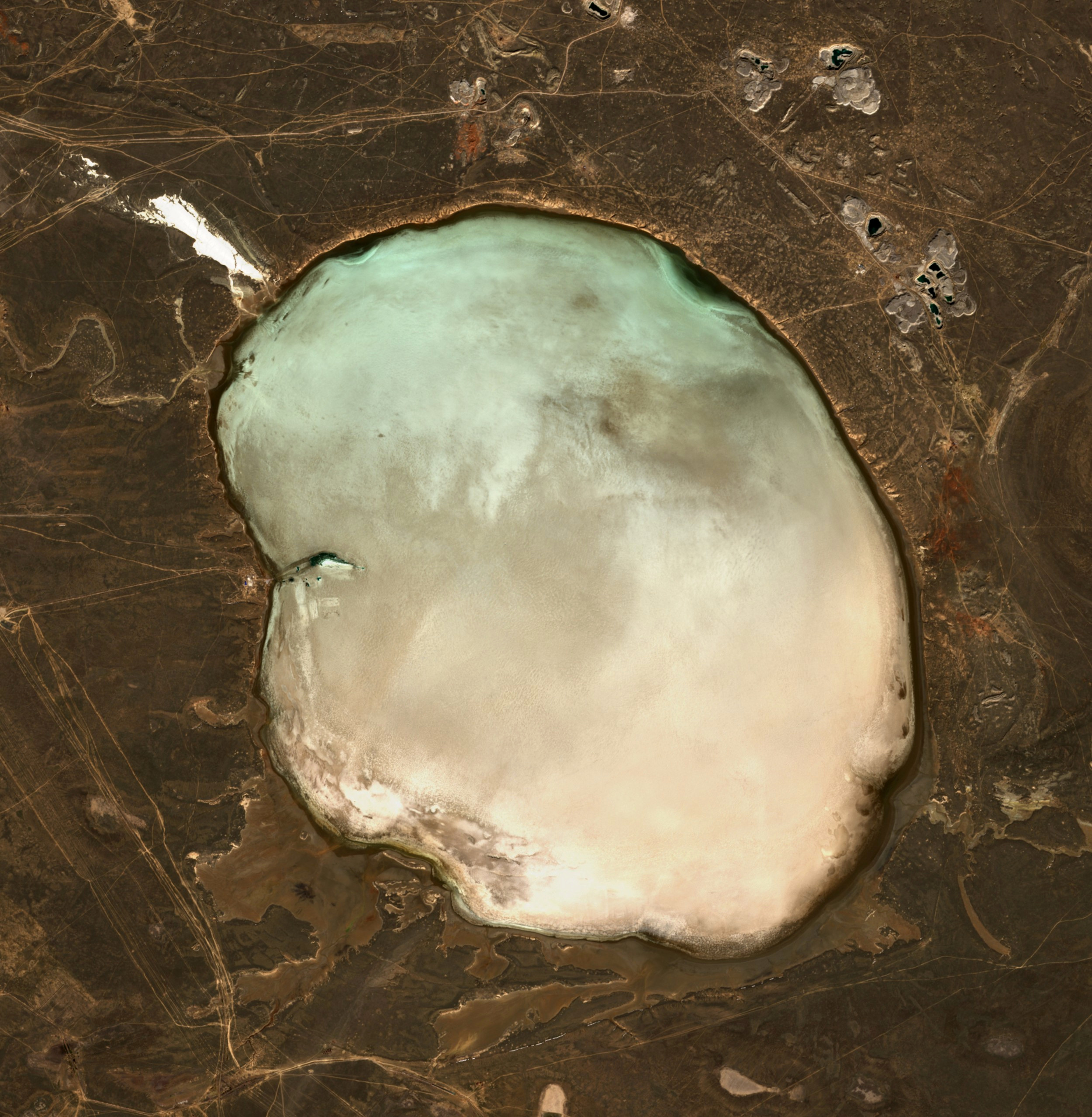
- Sentinel-2 image of the lake in 2019

- Location within Kazakhstan
- Location: Caspian Lowland
- Coordinates: 48°28′N 54°54′E
- Type: Endorheic
- Primary inflows: Underground water
- Primary outflows: None
- Catchment area: 425 square kilometers (164 sq mi)
- Basin countries: Kazakhstan
- Max. length: 13 kilometers (8.1 mi)
- Max. width: 11 kilometers (6.8 mi)
- Surface area: 110 square kilometers (42 sq mi)
- Average depth: 0.7 meters (2 ft 4 in)
- Surface elevation: −27 meters (−89 ft)
- Islands: 0

Inder (Kazakh: Индер; Russian: Индер) is a salt lake in Inder District, Atyrau Region, Kazakhstan.

The mineral Inderite and the plant Eremurus inderiensis were named after the lake.

== Geography ==
Inder an endorheic lake in the northern part of the Caspian Lowland. It is located 10,000 meters (33,000 ft) to the east of the Ural river. The southern foothills of the Inder Mountains rise above the northern and northeastern lakeshores. The lake is very shallow. Under the water surface there is a salt crust that is on average 10 meters (33 ft) to 15 meters (49 ft) thick. Inderbor town is located 10 kilometers (6.2 mi) to the northwest of the lake.

There is one river flowing into the lake, but none come out of it. Inder is fed mainly by groundwater. The salt of the lake is of high quality. It contains potassium, bromine and boron. Up to 2021 Inder lake is recognized as the Type locality for seven minerals: Hydroboracite, Inderborite, Inderite, Kurgantaite, Kurnakovite, Preobrazhenskite and Volkovskite.

== See also ==
- List of lakes of Kazakhstan
