= European Russia =

Western and most populated part of Russia

Coordinates: 55°N 40°E

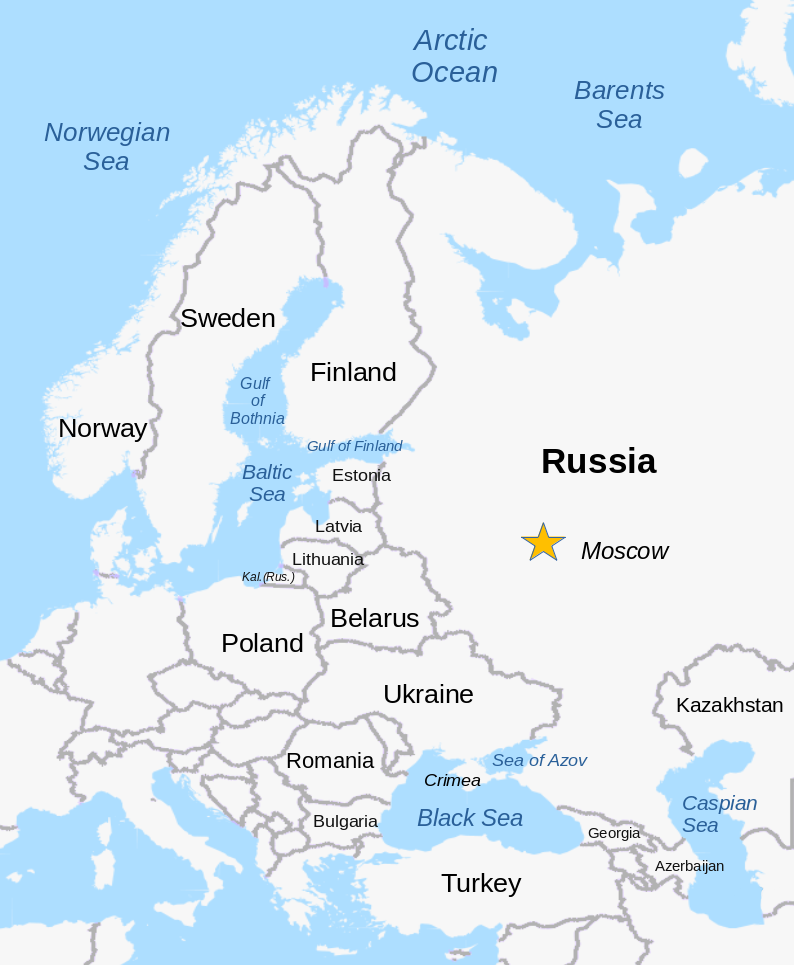
- Largest city: Moscow
- Demonym: Russian

Area
  - Total: 3,969,100 km^{2} (1,532,500 sq mi) (7th)

Population
  - 2023 estimate: 109,455,000 (13th)
  - Density: 27.5/km^{2} (71.2/sq mi) (160th)
- GDP (PPP): 2024 estimate
  - Total: ▲$5.1 trillion
  - Per capita: ▲$46,300
- GDP (nominal): 2024 estimate
  - Total: ▲$1.8 trillion
  - Per capita: ▲$16,400

European Russia (Note: Russian: Европейская Россия, romanized: Yevropeyskaya Rossiya, also Европейская часть России "European part of Russia" or Европейская территория России "European territory of Russia".) is the western and most populated part of the Russian Federation. It is geographically situated in Europe, as opposed to the country's sparsely populated and vastly larger eastern part, Siberia, which is situated in Asia, encompassing the entire northern region of the continent. The parts of Russia are divided by the Ural Mountains , the Ural River, and the Miass River, which bisect the Eurasian supercontinent. European Russia spans roughly 40% of Europe's total landmass, with over 15% of its total population, making Russia the largest and most populous country in Europe. The region is divided into six Federal districts.

== Area and demographics ==
European Russia accounts for 80% of Russia's total population. It covers an area of over 3,969,100 square kilometres (1,532,500 mi^{2}), with a population of nearly 110 million—making Russia the largest country in Europe, surpassing Ukraine, and the most populous, surpassing Germany. (Note: Turkey is only partially in Europe, in East Thrace, which has a population of about 12 million.) European Russia is the most densely populated region of Russia, with a population density of 27.5 people per km^{2} (70 per sq mi). European Russia counts for about 15% of Europe's total population.

All three federal cities of Russia lie within European Russia. These cities are Moscow, the nation's capital and largest city, which is the most populous city entirely within Europe; Saint Petersburg, the cultural capital and the second-most populous city in the country; and Sevastopol, located in Crimea, which is internationally recognized as part of Ukraine.

Of the 16 Russian cities with over 1 million inhabitants, 12 lie within European Russia: Moscow, Saint Petersburg, Kazan, Nizhny Novgorod, Samara, Ufa, Chelyabinsk, Rostov-on-Don, Krasnodar, Voronezh, Perm and Volgograd (the remaining four are Yekaterinburg, Omsk, Krasnoyarsk and Novosibirsk).

With majority of the population being Slavic, Moscow being the capital city, and Christianity being the dominating religion, Russia is mainly counted as a European country. When it comes to sports and entertainment, Russia for example plays soccer as a UEFA member and has participated in the Eurovision Song Contest as a member of the European Broadcasting Union.

== History ==
Part of Russia situated in Europe (c. 23% of the total country's territory)

The historical population of European Russia was composed of Slavic, Finno-Ugric, Germanic, Turkic, Jewish, Scythian, North Caucasian, Hunnic and Baltic peoples.

Some theories say that some early Eastern Slavs arrived in modern-day western Russia (also in Ukraine and Belarus) sometime during the middle of the first millennium AD. The Eastern Slavic tribe of the Vyatichis was native to the land around the Oka river. Finno-Ugric, Baltic and Turkic tribes were also present in the area (although large parts of the Turkic and Finno-Ugric people were absorbed by the Slavs, there are great minorities in European Russia today). The western region of Central Russia was inhabited by the Eastern Slavic tribe of the Severians.

One of the first Rus' regions according to the Sofia First Chronicle was Veliky Novgorod in 859. In late 8th and early-to-mid-9th centuries AD the Rus' Khaganate was formed in modern western Russia. The region was a place of operations for Varangians, eastern Scandinavian adventurers, merchants, and pirates. From the late 9th to the mid-13th century a large section of today's European Russia was part of Kievan Rus'. The lands of Rus' Khaganate and Kievan Rus' were important trade routes and connected Scandinavia, Byzantine Empire, Rus' people and Volga Bulgaria with Khazaria and Persia. According to old Scandinavian sources among the 12 biggest cities of Kievan Rus' or Ancient Rus' were Novgorod, Kiev, Polotsk, Smolensk, Murom and Rostov.

Through trade and cultural contact with Byzantine Empire, the Slavic culture of the Rus' adopted gradually the Eastern Orthodox religion. Many sources say that Ryazan, Kolomna, Moscow, Vladimir and Kiev were destroyed by the Mongol Empire. After the Mongol invasion the Muscovite Rus' arose, over all this time, western Russia and the various Rus' regions had strong cultural contacts with the Byzantine Empire, while the Slavic culture was cultivated all the time. The elements of East Slavic paganism and Christianity overlapped each other and sometimes produced even double faith in Muscovite Rus'.

== Economy ==
In 2022 the GRDP of European Russia was around ₽100 trillion (US$1.4 trillion).

== Alignment with administrative divisions ==
Federal districts of Russia

The following Federal districts of Russia are wholly or partly European:

Name of district	Area (km^{2})	Population (2023)	Population density	GRDP (2022)	Continent notes
Central Federal District	650,200	40,198,659	59.658	₽47.368 trillion ($692 billion)	Europe
North Caucasian Federal District	170,400	10,251,083	56.58	₽3.111 trillion ($45 billion)	Europe
Northwestern Federal District	1,687,000	13,840,352	8.25	₽18.929 trillion ($276 billion)	Europe
Southern Federal District (Note: Includes the Republic of Crimea and the city of Sevastopol, which are both de facto administrated by Russia but considered part of Ukraine by most other states.)	447,900	16,624,081	33.46	₽9.816 trillion ($143 billion)	Europe
Volga Federal District	1,037,000	28,540,832	28.63	₽19.664 trillion ($287 billion)	Predominantly Europe
Ural Federal District	1,818,500	12,262,205	6.86	₽20.073 trillion ($293 billion)	Predominantly Asia - Europe
Sum of 6 Federal Districts (Note: Does not account for the following: Volga Federal District has 4 raions entirely in Asia, one raion mostly in Asia, one raion bisected between Europe and Asia, two cities bisected between Europe and Asia and one settlement fully in Asia, which amount to 280,000 people living in 30,000 km^{2} in Asia (as defined as east of the Ural River). Ural Federal District has roughly 200,000 people living in 1,700 km^{2} in Europe (west of the Ural River).)	3,995,200	109,455,000	27.22	₽98.890 trillion ($1444 billion)	Predominantly Europe

== See also ==
- North Asia
  - Russian Far East
  - Siberia
- Kievan Rus'
- Great Russia
- White Russia
