= European Union statistics =

Demographic, economic and governmental statistics regarding EU member states

Statistics in the European Union are collected by Eurostat (European statistics body).

== Area and population ==
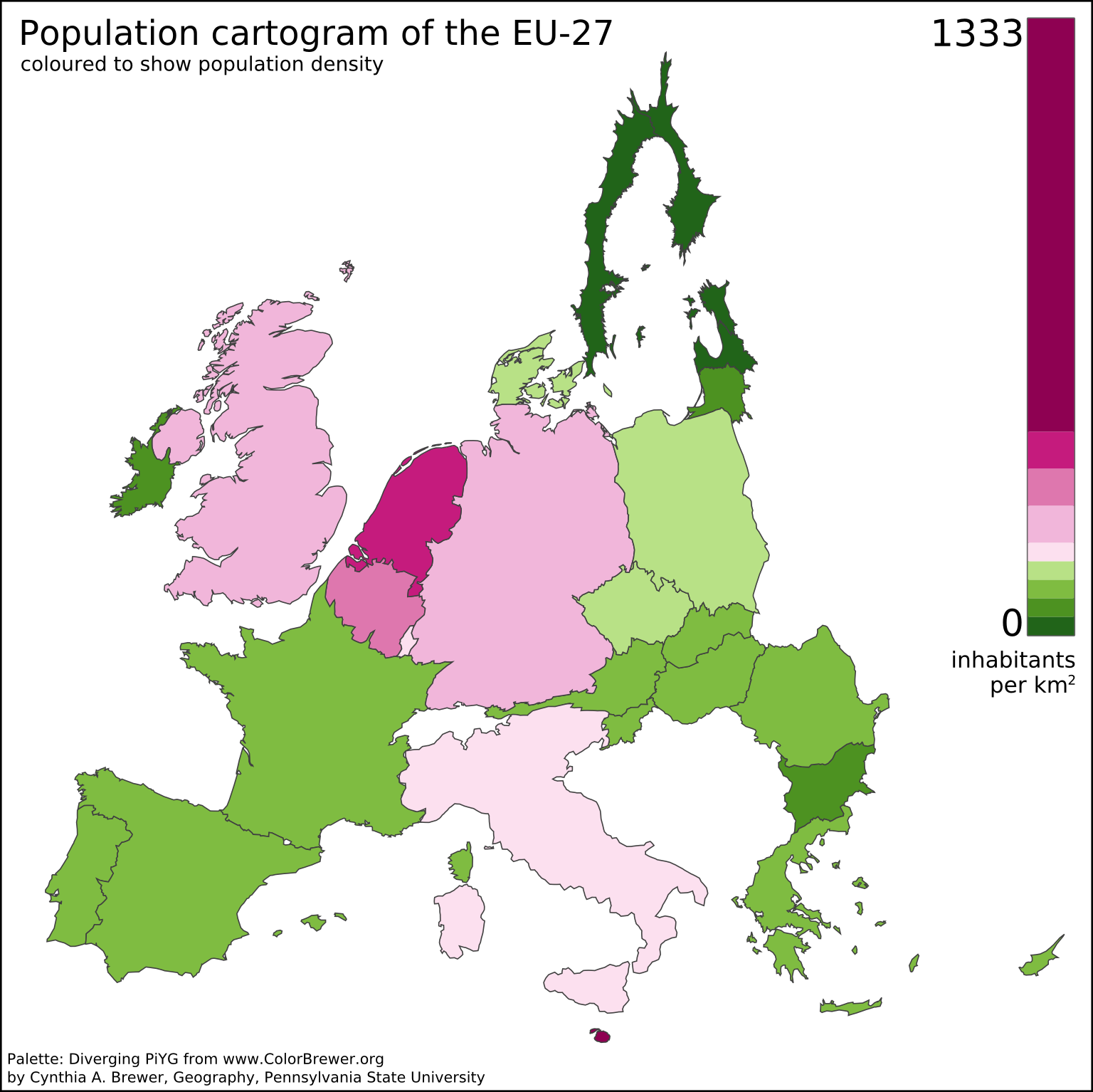
EU and UK population cartogram

As of 1 January 2006, the population of the EU was about 493 million people, although in 2020 the EU lost over 10% of its population as a result of the UK leaving the bloc. Many countries are expected to experience a decline in population over the coming decades, though this could be offset with new countries planning to join the EU within the next 20 years. The most populous member state is Germany, with an estimated 80.4 million people. France and Ireland have the highest birth-rates. The most densely populated country is the island of Malta, which is also the smallest, while the largest in area is France. The least densely populated country is Finland.

The table below uses data from Eurostat.

Member State	Population	% pop.	Area km^{2}	% area	Density /km^{2}
European Union	448,387,872	100%	4,225,134	100%	106
Austria	9,104,772	2.0%	83,878	2.0%	109
Belgium	11,754,004	2.6%	30,667	0.7%	383
Bulgaria	6,447,710	1.4%	110,996	2.6%	58
Croatia	3,850,894	0.9%	56,594	1.3%	68
Cyprus	920,701	0.2%	9,253	0.2%	100
Czech Republic	10,827,529	2.4%	78,871	1.9%	137
Denmark	5,932,654	1.3%	42,925	1.0%	138
Estonia	1,365,884	0.3%	45,336	1.1%	30
Finland	5,563,970	1.2%	338,411	8.0%	16
France	68,070,697	15.2%	638,475	15.1%	107
Germany	84,358,845	18.8%	357,569	8.5%	236
Greece	10,394,055	2.3%	131,694	3.1%	79
Hungary	9,597,085	2.1%	93,012	2.2%	103
Ireland	5,194,336	1.2%	69,947	1.7%	74
Italy	58,850,717	13.1%	302,079	7.1%	195
Latvia	1,883,008	0.4%	64,586	1.5%	29
Lithuania	2,857,279	0.6%	65,284	1.5%	44
Luxembourg	672,050	0.1%	2,586	0.1%	260
Malta	542,051	0.1%	316	0.01%	1715
Netherlands	17,811,291	4.0%	37,378	0.9%	477
Poland	36,753,736	8.2%	311,928	7.4%	118
Portugal	10,467,366	2.3%	92,227	2.2%	113
Romania	19,051,562	4.2%	238,398	5.6%	80
Slovakia	5,428,792	1.2%	49,035	1.2%	111
Slovenia	2,116,792	0.5%	20,273	0.5%	104
Spain	48,059,777	10.7%	505,983	12.0%	95
Sweden	10,521,556	2.3%	447,424	10.6%	24

== Economy ==
For statistics relating to economy, please see Economy of the European Union.

=== EU budget ===
The primary resource for funding the European Union is the contributions sought from member states. Each member state contributes to the EU budget, and receives funding back from the EU, depending on the relative wealth of the states, i.e. their ability to pay.

The table below shows the contributions as a percentage of the total budget. This takes into account the special considerations given to the United Kingdom to reduce its contribution through a rebate. Expenditure in Luxembourg, Belgium and France include items for the EU administrative centres in each of those countries.

Figures below are in Euros, where applicable. Data are for the year 2006.

Member State	Total contribution	% total	Total expenditure	% total	Net contrib.	Net contrib. per capita	Total contrib. per capita
European Union	105,259,468,772	100.00%	106,575,500,000	100.00%	-1,316,031,228	-3	213
Germany	22,218,438,941	21.11%	12,242,400,000	11.49%	9,976,038,941	124	276
France	17,303,107,859	16.44%	13,496,200,000	12.66%	3,806,907,859	59	266
Italy	14,359,479,157	13.64%	10,922,300,000	10.25%	3,437,179,157	58	244
United Kingdom	13,739,900,046	13.05%	8,294,200,000	7.78%	5,445,700,046	90	226
Spain	8,957,286,488	8.51%	12,883,000,000	12.09%	-3,925,713,512	-88	200
Netherlands	5,552,933,781	5.28%	2,190,400,000	2.06%	3,362,533,781	198	327
Belgium	4,035,286,807	3.83%	5,625,100,000	5.28%	-1,589,813,193	-151	384
Sweden	2,832,862,800	2.69%	1,573,400,000	1.48%	1,259,462,800	126	283
Austria	2,308,432,030	2.19%	1,830,100,000	1.72%	478,332,030	58	278
Denmark	2,130,860,212	2.02%	1,501,900,000	1.41%	628,960,212	116	395
Poland	2,099,087,114	1.99%	5,305,600,000	4.98%	-3,206,512,886	-84	55
Greece	1,882,611,879	1.79%	6,833,700,000	6.41%	-4,951,088,121	-446	170
Finland	1,544,832,284	1.47%	1,280,400,000	1.20%	264,432,284	50	291
Portugal	1,443,049,602	1.37%	3,634,800,000	3.41%	-2,191,750,398	-207	136
Ireland	1,341,281,313	1.27%	2,461,800,000	2.31%	-1,120,518,687	-244	292
Hungary	1,003,119,411	0.95%	1,842,200,000	1.73%	-839,080,589	-83	99
Czech Republic	932,392,859	0.89%	1,330,000,000	1.25%	-397,607,141	-39	91
Slovakia	393,148,777	0.37%	696,200,000	0.65%	-303,051,223	-56	73
Slovenia	299,993,572	0.29%	406,000,000	0.38%	-106,006,428	-53	150
Luxembourg	241,439,011	0.23%	1,194,800,000	1.12%	-953,360,989	-1,907	483
Lithuania	221,997,405	0.21%	799,800,000	0.75%	-577,802,595	-170	65
Cyprus	144,556,416	0.14%	239,600,000	0.22%	-95,043,584	-119	181
Latvia	115,205,431	0.11%	402,600,000	0.24%	-287,394,569	-125	50
Estonia	100,756,308	0.10%	300,000,000	0.28%	-199,243,692	-142	72
Malta	57,409,269	0.05%	157,000,000	0.14%	-99,590,731	-249	144
Bulgaria			360,600,000	0.34%	-360,600,000	-47	
Romania			693,100,000	0.65%	-693,100,000	-32	

== Economic and governance-related rankings ==
There are many indices available on issues such as corruption, development, and freedom. The rankings below include all EU member states, EU candidates (with the exception of Turkey, as accession negotiations have stalled since 2016) and EFTA countries.

=== Freedom of the press ===
EU Rank	Member State	Global Rank
1	Norway	1
2	Finland	2
3	Denmark	3
4	Sweden	5
5	Netherlands	6
6	Switzerland	8
7	Portugal	10
8	Germany	11
9	Belgium	12
10	Ireland	13
11	Estonia	14
12	Iceland	15
13	Luxembourg	17
14	Austria	18
15	Latvia	22
16	Cyprus	27
17	Lithuania	28

EU Rank	Member State	Global Rank
18	Spain	29
19	Slovenia	32
20	Slovakia	33
21	France	34
22	Czech Republic	40
23	Italy	41
24	Romania	48
25	Croatia	59
26	Poland	62
27	Greece	65
28	Malta	81
29	Albania	85
30	Hungary	89
31	North Macedonia	92
32	Serbia	93
33	Montenegro	105
34	Bulgaria	111

Reporters sans frontières (Reporters Without Borders) conducts an annual survey on the freedom of the press and produces scores (not shown here) for each country, resulting in the Press Freedom Index. In 2019 and 2020, Finland was proclaimed as having the freest press in the European Union, and the second in the world behind Norway. Bulgaria was ranked as having the least free press in the European Union in 2019 and 2020.

Colour Codes
Good Situation
Satisfactory Situation
Noticeable problems
Difficult situation

=== Economic freedom ===
EU Rank	Member State	Global Rank
1	Switzerland	5
2	Ireland	6
3	Denmark	8
4	Estonia	10
5	Iceland	13
6	Netherlands	14
7	Lithuania	16
8	Luxembourg	19
9	Finland	20
10	Sweden	22
11	Czech Republic	23
12	Germany	27
13	Norway	28
14	Austria	29
15	Latvia	32
16	Bulgaria	36
17	Cyprus	37

EU Rank	Member State	Global Rank
18	Romania	38
19	North Macedonia	41
20	Malta	42
21	Poland	46
22	Belgium	48
23	Slovenia	52
24	Portugal	56
25	Albania	57
26	Spain	58
27	Slovakia	60
28	Hungary	62
29	France	64
30	Serbia	65
31	Italy	74
32	Croatia	84
33	Montenegro	91
34	Greece	100

The Index of Economic Freedom, published by The Wall Street Journal and The Heritage Foundation, uses 50 different variables to compile the survey, in areas such as trade policy and government intervention.

A similar index produced by the World Economic Forum is its Global Competitiveness Index.

Colour Codes
Free
Mostly Free
Moderately Free
Moderately Unfree

=== Perception of corruption ===
Global Rank	Country	Score
1	Denmark	90
2	Finland	87
4	Norway	84
5	Sweden	83
7	Switzerland	82
8	Netherlands	80
9	Germany	79
10	Luxembourg	77
10	Ireland	77
14	Estonia	74
14	Iceland	74
18	Belgium	73
18	United Kingdom	73
21	France	72
22	Austria	71
33	Lithuania	62
33	Portugal	62
35	Spain	60
39	Latvia	59
41	Italy	56
41	Slovenia	56
41	Czech Republic	56

Global Rank	Country	Score
41	Georgia	56
45	Poland	55
49	Slovakia	53
51	Greece	52
51	Cyprus	52
54	Malta	51
57	Croatia	50
63	Romania	46
63	Armenia	46
65	Montenegro	45
72	Bulgaria	43
77	Hungary	42
84	Kosovo	41
85	North Macedonia	40
91	Moldova	39
91	Belarus	39
101	Serbia	36
101	Albania	36
101	Turkey	36
110	Bosnia and Herzegovina	34
116	Ukraine	33
137	Russia	28

Transparency International is an international NGO publishing an annual Global Corruption Report indicating the perception of corruption around the world. The rankings of the table refer to the Corruption Perceptions Index 2022 . A high ranking means low corruption.

=== Human development ===
Rank	Country	Global Rank
1	Norway	1
2	Ireland	2
3	Switzerland	2
4	Iceland	4
5	Germany	6
6	Sweden	7
7	Netherlands	8
8	Denmark	10
9	Finland	11
10	United Kingdom	13
11	Belgium	14
12	Austria	18
13	Slovenia	22
14	Luxembourg	23
15	Spain	25
16	France	26
17	Czech Republic	27
18	Malta	28
19	Estonia	29
20	Italy	29
21	Greece	32
22	Cyprus	33

Rank	Country	Global Rank
23	Lithuania	34
24	Poland	35
25	Latvia	37
26	Portugal	38
27	Slovakia	39
28	Hungary	40
29	Croatia	43
30	Montenegro	48
31	Romania	49
32	Russia	52
33	Belarus	53
34	Turkey	54
35	Bulgaria	56
36	Georgia	61
37	Serbia	64
38	Albania	69
39	Bosnia and Herzegovina	73
40	Ukraine	74
41	Armenia	81
42	North Macedonia	82
43	Azerbaijan	88
44	Moldova	90

Colour Codes
Very High Human Development
High Human Development

The Human Development Index is a measure produced by the United Nations which covers three aspects of human development:

- poverty (GDP per capita)
- education (mean years of schooling and expected years of schooling)
- health (life expectancy)

The rankings of the table refer to the UNDP Human Development Report 2019 (2018 data). The UN lists all EU member states as countries with very high human development.

=== Democracy Index ===
Global Rank	Country	Score
1	Norway	9.81
3	Iceland	9.45
4	Sweden	9.39
5	Finland	9.30
6	Denmark	9.28
7	Ireland	9.19
8	Switzerland	9.14
9	Netherlands	9.00
11	Luxembourg	8.81
12	Germany	8.80
18	Austria	8.28
19	United Kingdom	8.28
20	Greece	8.14
23	France	8.07
23	Spain	8.07
26	Czech Republic	7.97
27	Estonia	7.96
28	Malta	7.93
31	Slovenia	7.75
31	Portugal	7.75
34	Italy	7.69
36	Belgium	7.64

Global Rank	Country	Score
37	Cyprus	7.38
38	Latvia	7.38
39	Lithuania	7.31
41	Poland	7.18
44	Slovakia	7.07
50	Hungary	6.72
52	Montenegro	6.67
58	Croatia	6.50
60	Romania	6.45
62	Bulgaria	6.41
64	Serbia	6.33
66	Albania	6.28
68	Moldova	6.23
73	North Macedonia	6.03
84	Armenia	5.42
89	Georgia	5.20
91	Ukraine	5.06
94	Bosnia and Herzegovina	5.00
102	Turkey	4.33
130	Azerbaijan	2.80
144	Russia	2.22
151	Belarus	1.99

The Democracy Index is an index compiled by the Economist Intelligence Unit (EIU), the research division of the Economist Group, a UK-based private company which publishes the weekly newspaper The Economist.

== See also ==
- Enlargement of the European Union
- Largest cities of the European Union by population within city limits
- Hispanics and Latins in Europe
- List of European Union member states by population
- Largest urban areas of the European Union and Larger Urban Zones
- Organization for Security and Co-operation in Europe statistics
