= Shyngyrlau (river) =

River in Kazakhstan

Shyngyrlau Utva
- Mouth location in Kazakhstan

Physical characteristics
- Source
  - location: Shybyndy Mountain
  - elevation: 250 m (0.16 mi)
- Mouth: Ural
  - coordinates: 51°23′11″N 52°30′25″E
  - elevation: 42 m (0.026 mi)
- Length: 290 km (180 mi)
- Basin size: 6,940 km^{2} (2,680 sq mi)

Basin features
- Progression: Ural→ Caspian Sea

The Shyngyrlau (Kazakh: Шыңғырлау) or Utva (Russian: Утва) is a river in West Kazakhstan Region, Kazakhstan, a tributary of the Ural. It is 290 kilometres (180 mi) long, and has a drainage basin of 6,940 square kilometres (2,680 sq mi).
