= Kurnakovite =

Hydrated borate of magnesium

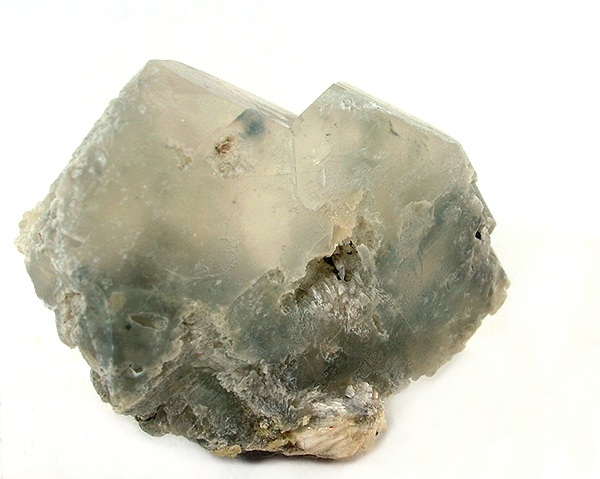
- Kurnakovite from Boron, California

General
- Category: Nesoborates
- Formula: MgB_{3}O_{3}(OH)_{5}·5H_{2}O
- IMA symbol: Kko
- Strunz classification: 6.CA.20
- Crystal system: Triclinic
- Crystal class: Pinacoidal (1̅) (same H-M symbol)
- Space group: P1̅
- Unit cell: a = 8.3479(1) b = 10.6068(1) c = 6.4447(1) [Å] α = 98.846°, β = 108.981° γ = 105.581°; Z = 2

Identification
- Color: White; colorless in transmitted light
- Crystal habit: Aggregates of prismatic crystals
- Twinning: Twinning uncommon
- Cleavage: Poor to indistinct on {010}
- Mohs scale hardness: 2 1/2 – 3
- Luster: Vitreous
- Streak: White
- Diaphaneity: Transparent to translucent
- Specific gravity: 1.847 – 1.852
- Optical properties: Biaxial (-)
- Refractive index: n_{α} = 1.488 – 1.491 n_{β} = 1.508 – 1.510 n_{γ} = 1.515 – 1.525
- Birefringence: δ = 0.027 – 0.034
- 2V angle: Measured: 60° to 80°

Kurnakovite is a hydrated borate of magnesium with the chemical composition MgB_{3}O_{3}(OH)_{5}·5H_{2}O. It is a member of the inderite group and is a triclinic dimorph of the monoclinic inderite.

== Discovery and occurrence ==
Kurnakovite, was first described by Godlevsky in 1940 for an occurrence in the Inder lake borate deposits in Atyrau Province, Kazakhstan, and is named for Russian mineralogist and chemist Nikolai Semenovich Kurnakov (1860–1941).

In addition to the type locality in Kazakhstan, kurakovite has also been reported from the Zhacang-Caka brine lake, Tibet; the Kirka borate deposit, Kiitahya Province, Turkey; the Kramer borate deposit, Boron, Kern County, California; Death Valley National Park, Inyo County, California; and the Tincalayu borax deposit, Salar del Hombre Muerto, Salta Province, Argentina.

== Properties ==
Kurnakovite has triclinic – pinacodial crystallography. It forms as rough, prismatic crystals, typically in dense aggregates. Kurnakovite has distinct cleavage and a conchoidal fracture. Its tenacity is brittle and it ranges between 2.5 – 3 on the Mohs hardness scale. It is not soluble in water, though it will start dissolving in warm acid. Kurnakovite is usually colorless or white and either transparent or translucent. It has a vitreous, pearly luster and a refractive index of between 1.488 – 1.525.
