= List of European countries by population =

European countries by population in 2025 More than 100 million Between 30 and 100 million Between 10 and 30 million Between 3 and 10 million Between 1 and 3 million Between 0.3 and 1 million Less than 0.3 million

This list of European countries by population, comprises the 51 countries and 5 territories, and dependencies in Europe broadly defined, thus including Cyprus, Kazakhstan, Turkey, and the countries of the Caucasus, even though parts or all of those could technically located in Asia.

The table below comprises the entire population of each country. For instance, the most populous European country is Russia, with a population of over 110 million in its European part (144 million overall).

Turkey, with a population of about 85 million, has most of its population living within its Asian part; though within its territory in Europe, some one-tenth of its population is situated. Excluding Turkey, Germany is the second-most populous country on the continent, with a population of about 84 million.

Kazakhstan is also a transcontinental country with a small part of it (west of the Ural river) located in Europe.

== Table ==
The ranking here is according to the national figures, which may be estimates or somewhat out of date so the ranking of countries that are very close in population is approximate. The United Nations estimates are those published in the UN's World Population Prospects, which are based on censuses, population registers, surveys, and other statistics. This list also includes the partially recognised country of Kosovo.

| | Location | UN estimate (2025) | % change | Official figure | Official date | Notes |
|---|---|---|---|---|---|---|
| | Europe | 744,398,832 | N/A | | | |
| 1 T | Russia | 143,997,393 | −0.6% | 146,150,789 | 1 Jan 2024 | (Note: Includes the disputed territories of the Republic of Crimea and the city of Sevastopol, but does not include further disputed territories annexed in 2022.) |
| 2 T | Turkey | 87,685,426 | 0.3% | 85,664,944 | 31 Dec 2024 | |
| 3 | Germany | 84,075,074 | −0.6% | 83,510,950 | 30 Jun 2024 | |
| 4 | United Kingdom | 69,551,332 | 0.6% | 68,265,209 | 30 Jun 2023 | (Note: Includes the constituent countries of England, Northern Ireland, Scotland, and Wales. Excludes the 14 Overseas Territories and 3 Crown Dependencies. Gibraltar, Jersey, the Isle of Man, and Guernsey shown separately below.) |
| 5 T | France | 66,650,804 | 0.2% | 69,082,000 | 1 Jan 2026 | (Note: Yearly national estimate. Including the integral 18 regions of France (including five overseas regions). Excluding France's five overseas collectivities: French Polynesia, Saint Barthélemy, Saint Martin, Saint Pierre and Miquelon, and Wallis and Futuna, and the sui generis collectivity of New Caledonia, which are shown separately. Clipperton Island (an uninhabited state private property of France) and the French Southern and Antarctic Lands (including several uninhabited islands and an Antarctic territorial claim hosting only government officials and research station staff) are not listed at all due to a lack of permanent population.) |
| 6 T | Italy | 59,146,260 | −0.3% | 58,974,433 | 31 Jul 2024 | |
| 7 T | Spain | 47,889,958 | 0% | 49,801,559 | 6 Aug 2026 | |
| 8 | Ukraine | 38,980,377 | −0.3% | 41,130,432 | 1 Feb 2022 | (Note: Excludes the Autonomous Republic of Crimea and City of Sevastopol, Ukraine's administrative areas on the Crimean Peninsula which are disputed with and de facto administered by Russia. However, includes the entire population of territory in the Donbas region where there are ongoing insurgencies by separatist forces, and does not include any changes due to the Russian invasion in 2022.) |
| 9 | Poland | 37,332,000 | −1.0% | 37,552,000 | 31 Jul 2024 | |
| 10 T | Kazakhstan | 20,843,754 | 1.2% | 20,201,849 | 1 Sep 2024 | |
| 11 | Romania | 18,908,650 | −0.6% | 19,064,409 | 1 Jan 2024 | |
| 12 T | Netherlands | 18,346,819 | 0.6% | 18,005,142 | 31 Aug 2024 | |
| 13 | Belgium | 11,758,603 | 0.2% | 11,763,650 | 1 Jan 2024 | |
| 14 | Sweden | 10,656,633 | 0.5% | 10,576,145 | 31 Aug 2024 | |
| 15 | Czech Republic | 10,609,240 | −1.2% | 10,909,500 | 1 Jan 2025 | |
| 16 T | Portugal | 10,411,834 | −0.1% | 11,424,031 | 31 Dec 2025 | |
| 17 T | Azerbaijan | 10,397,713 | 0.6% | 10,180,800 | 1 Jan 2024 | |
| 18 T | Greece | 9,938,844 | −1.1% | 10,248,505 | 10 Oct 2024 | |
| 19 | Hungary | 9,632,287 | −0.5% | 9,584,627 | 1 Jan 2024 | |
| 20 | Austria | 9,113,574 | −0.1% | 9,154,514 | 1 Oct 2023 | |
| 21 | Belarus | 8,997,603 | −0.7% | 9,155,978 | 1 Jan 2024 | |
| 22 | Switzerland | 8,967,408 | 0.5% | 8,931,306 | 30 Sep 2023 | |
| 23 | Bulgaria | 6,714,560 | −0.6% | 6,447,710 | 31 Dec 2022 | |
| 24 | Serbia | 6,689,039 | −0.7% | 6,641,197 | 1 Jan 2023 | (Note: Excludes Kosovo.) |
| 25 T | Denmark | 6,002,507 | 0.4% | 5,959,464 | 1 Oct 2023 | |
| 26 | Finland | 5,623,330 | 0.1% | 5,599,869 | 31 Oct 2023 | |
| 27 T | Norway | 5,618,354 | 0.8% | 5,571,634 | 1 Oct 2025 | |
| 28 | Slovakia | 5,474,881 | −0.6% | 5,426,248 | 1 Apr 2023 | |
| 29 | Ireland | 5,308,039 | 1.0% | 5,149,139 | 3 Apr 2022 | |
| 30 | Croatia | 3,848,160 | −0.7% | 3,879,074 | 31 Dec 2021 | |
| 31 T | Georgia | 3,806,671 | 0% | 3,688,600 | 1 Jan 2022 | (Note: Excludes Abkhazia (242,862, census 2011) and South Ossetia (53,559, census 2015).) |
| 32 | Bosnia and Herzegovina | 3,140,096 | −0.8% | 3,219,415 | 15 Jun 2020 | |
| 33 | Moldova | 2,996,106 | −1.3% | 2,423,300 | 1 Jan 2024 | |
| 34 C | Armenia | 2,952,364 | −0.7% | 3,075,800 | 1 Jan 2024 | |
| 35 | Lithuania | 2,830,144 | −1.0% | 2,889,888 | 1 Jan 2025 | |
| 36 | Albania | 2,771,508 | −0.7% | 2,793,592 | 1 Jan 2022 | |
| 37 | Slovenia | 2,117,072 | −0.1% | 2,107,180 | 1 Jan 2022 | |
| 38 | Latvia | 1,853,559 | −1.0% | 1,862,700 | 1 May 2024 | |
| 39 | North Macedonia | 1,813,791 | −0.5% | 1,836,713 | 15 Dec 2024 | |
| 40 | Kosovo | 1,674,125 | −0.6% | 1,602,515 | Apr 2024 | |
| 41 C | Cyprus | 1,370,754 | 0.9% | 966,400 | 31 Dec 2023 | (Note: National data only includes the Government-controlled area of Cyprus) |
| 42 | Estonia | 1,344,232 | −1.2% | 1,369,285 | 1 Jan 2025 | |
| 43 | Luxembourg | 680,454 | 1.1% | 645,397 | 1 Jan 2024 | |
| 44 | Montenegro | 632,729 | −0.9% | 617,683 | 1 Jan 2022 | |
| 45 | Malta | 545,405 | 1.1% | 520,971 | 31 Dec 2021 | |
| 46 | Iceland | 398,266 | 1.2% | 396,960 | 30 Sep 2023 | |
| | Jersey (United Kingdom) | 103,988 | 0.1% | 103,267 | 21 Mar 2021 | |
| | Isle of Man (United Kingdom) | 84,118 | 0.2% | 84,975 | Q1 2025 | |
| 47 | Andorra | 82,904 | 1.2% | 80,120 | 1 May 2022 | |
| | Guernsey (United Kingdom) | 64,476 | 0.3% | 67,642 | 1 Jul 2023 | (Note: The Bailiwick of Guernsey comprises Guernsey proper (64,037), Alderney (2,141) and Sark (562). The UN estimate of 63,544 may exclude the smaller islands.) |
| | Faroe Islands (Denmark) | 56,002 | 1.1% | 55,177 | 1 Mar 2026 | |
| 48 | Liechtenstein | 40,128 | 0.6% | 40,900 | 31 Dec 2024 | |
| | Gibraltar (United Kingdom) | 40,126 | 2.0% | 34,003 | 26 Jun 2022 | |
| 49 | Monaco | 38,341 | −0.8% | 39,150 | 31 Dec 2021 | |
| 50 | San Marino | 33,572 | 0% | 33,785 | 30 Sep 2022 | |
| 51 | Vatican City | - | - | 764 | 26 Jun 2023 | (Note: UN estimate not available. Official figure notes 764 residents regardless of citizenship, 618 citizens regardless of residence, 246 resident citizens.) |

== See also ==
- Area and population of European countries
- List of European countries by area
- List of European countries by life expectancy
- List of European countries by population growth rate
- List of European Union member states by population
- List of sovereign states and dependent territories in Europe
- List of urban areas of the European Union
