= Bagyrlai =

River in Kazakhstan

Bagyrlai Бағырлай
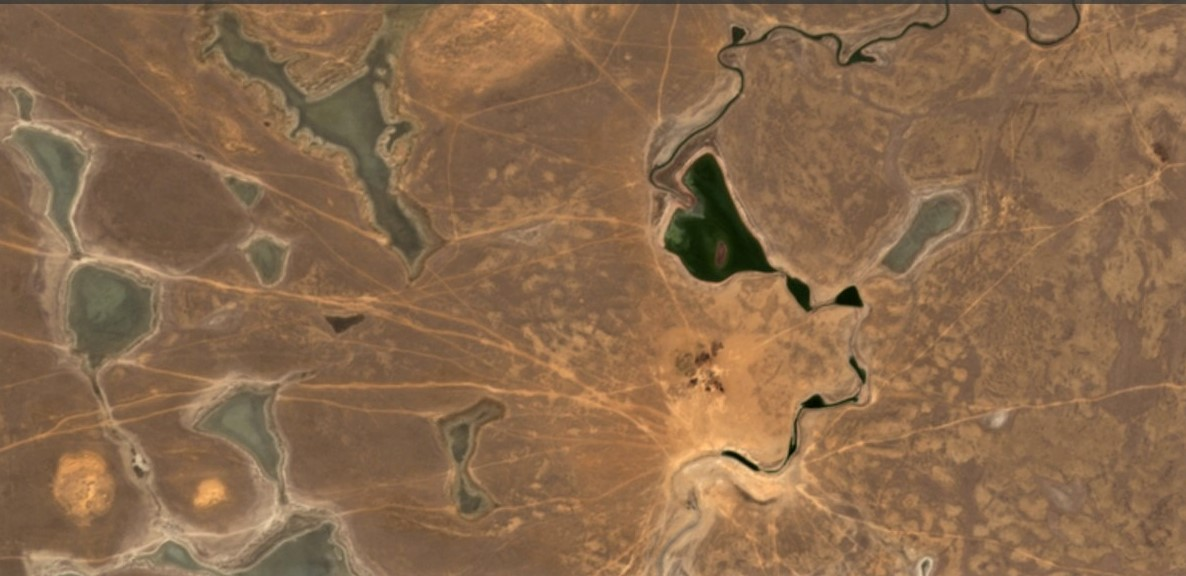
- Final stretch of river Bagyrlai Sentinel-2 image

- Mouth location in Kazakhstan

Location
- Countries: Kazakhstan

Physical characteristics
- Source: Ural near Atameken
  - coordinates: 49°24′30″N 54°42′19″E
  - elevation: −8 m (−26 ft)
- Mouth: near lake Terenkyzyl
  - coordinates: 48°10′55″N 51°14′09″E
  - elevation: −13 m (−43 ft)
- Length: 239 km (149 mi)
- Basin size: 2,000 km^{2} (770 sq mi)
- Discharge
  - average: 2.1 cubic metres per second (74 cu ft/s)

The Bagyrlai (Kazakh: Бағырлай; Russian: Багырлай) is a river in Akzhaik District, West Kazakhstan Region, and Inder District, Atyrau Region, Kazakhstan. It is a right distributary of the Ural river, with a length of 239 km (149 mi) and a drainage basin of 2,000 km^{2} (770 sq mi). The river was originally a branch of an ancient delta of the Ural.

Its water is fresh, but mostly turbid. It is used for agricultural purposes and the riverbanks are a grazing ground for local cattle.

== Course ==
The Bagyrlai begins branching off the right side of the Ural river northwest of the village of Atameken (until 1994 Antonovo), close to Bazartobe. It heads southwards parallel to the Ural, forming meanders. Its mouth is to the north of lake Terenkyzyl, where it disperses in the sand about 20 km (12 mi) WSW of Orlik, a town on the banks of the Ural river.

The Bagyrlai valley and channel are wide. The right bank is generally steep. The river freezes yearly between December and April. The Bagyrlai Dam, having a surface of 5.5 km^{2} (2.1 sq mi), was built on the middle course of the river in 1962, at the time of the Kazakh SSR. There are other small earthen dams along its course.

== See also ==
- List of rivers of Kazakhstan
