= European Azerbaijan =

Portion of Azerbaijan located in Europe

European Azerbaijan Avropa Azərbaycanı (Azerbaijani)
- Largest city: Quba
- Ethnic groups: Azerbaijanis; Lezgins; Tats
- Demonym: Azerbaijani

Districts of Azerbaijan

Area
  - Total: 8,630 km^{2} (3,330 sq mi)

Population
  - Census: ~600,000
  - Density: 69.5/km^{2} (180.0/sq mi)

European Azerbaijan (Azerbaijani: Avropa Azərbaycanı, Azərbaycanın Avropa hissəsi) comprises the territory of Azerbaijan that lies north of the Greater Caucasus mountain range. The area includes Shabran, Khachmaz, Quba, Qusar, Siyazan and Khizi districts. It is geographically situated in Europe, as opposed to the country's sparsely populated and larger southern part, which is situated in Southwest Asia. The Caucasus Mountains divides Azerbaijan into two parts, bisecting the Eurasian mainland. Quba, the capital of Guba-Khachmaz Economic Region, is the main economic hub of the European part of Azerbaijan.

Despite containing only 10% of Azerbaijan's overall territory, European Azerbaijan's area of 8,630 km^{2} makes Azerbaijan the 40th-largest country in Europe, slightly smaller than Kosovo.

== Area ==
European Azerbaijan covers an area of 8,630 square kilometres (3,330 mi^{2}), which puts Azerbaijan in 40th place in terms of territory in Europe. The European part of Azerbaijan is located in the North Caucasus. On the western and northern sides is the territory of the Russian Federation, on the eastern side it is washed by the Caspian Sea, on the south it is bordered by the Greater Caucasus mountain range. The region is also home to Qırmızı Qəsəbə, also known as the Red Village, and is widely believed to be the world's only population centre exclusively made up of Jewish people outside of Israel and the United States, and is likewise considered to be the last surviving shtetl.

== Political consequences ==
The European Union is Azerbaijan's largest economic partner, accounting for approximately 41% of its total trade, and receiving 58% of Azerbaijan's exports. Azerbaijan is also a major recipient of foreign direct investment from the EU, serving as its leading foreign investor in both the oil and non-oil sectors. EU member states contribute significantly to Azerbaijan's economic diversification, infrastructure projects, and the energy sector (notably the Southern Gas Corridor).

The presence of European territory in Azerbaijan is a strong argument in favor of its European status from a geographical point of view and potential membership in the European Union.

Azerbaijan and EU relations are currently governed by a 1999 Partnership and Cooperation Agreement (PCA), with ongoing negotiations for a new, comprehensive framework agreement since 2017. The partnership focuses heavily on energy security, with a 2022 Memorandum of Understanding aimed at doubling natural gas imports via the Southern Gas Corridor. Azerbaijan is also part of the EU's Eastern Partnership initiative.

Currently, Azerbaijan is a member of the Council of Europe, a member of the European Political Community, a member of the European Commission for Democracy through Law (Venice Commission), a member of the European Higher Education Area, a member of the European Olympic Committees, the Union of European Football Associations (UEFA), etc.

== World Heritage Sites ==
The Khinalug village was included in the Cultural Landscape of Khinalug People and "Köç Yolu" Transhumance Route UNESCO World Heritage Site in 2023.
