= Jaiyk =

God of rivers in Turkic mythology

Jaiyk, also known as Cayık or sometimes Jayık Khan (Turkish: Yayık Han), is the god of rivers in Tengrism. He is an important deity in folk beliefs.

Jaiyk was previously known as Dayık in Altai mythology. He was originally the patron god of humanity and son of Kayra, but later the influence of his cult spread throughout Central Asian cultures. He was the deity of rivers, water, and lake water.

Jaiyk is depicted as a young man with a scourge in his hand. He lives at the junction of 17 rivers. Jaiyk has all the power of water and can make storms on the water. If he becomes angry, he makes and causes by floods on the Earth. All of the rivers and lakes are in the command of Jaiyk. He sends spirits to all rivers. Every river or creek has an İye (protector spirit or deity). The Tengrist concept of the god seems to associate him both to the destructive and the purifier powers of water.

== Rivers in folklore ==
According to ancient traditions and opinions, water and rivers are a sacred phenomenon and can purify all things. The people used to be obliged to respect the water in family or in social life. In the water sits and lives a protector spirit (familiar spirit). If he is angry, then he can be harmful to humans. Because of this disrespectful behavior, water may also become dry. Therefore, Tengrist writings and oral narratives tell cautionary tales and stories of irreverence to water. The Great Law of Genghis Khan (Yassa) has serious penalties when anyone pollutes water or rivers.

== Etymology ==
Gerard Clauson (1972) traces Southwestern Turkic yayık "a churn; spread out; flood water" to root *yay- "'shaking' or the like, used metaph. for 'unstable, fickle'."

== See also ==
- Ural River, originally named Yayıq (Note: Clauson disputes Turkic origin of the Ural river's old name Yayık as the old form Δάϊκος (Daïkos) was attested as early as the 2nd century CE by Ptolemy; instead, he proposes pre-Turkic, possibly Sarmatian, origin. Also, the d /ð/ to y /j/ sound change happened late (e.g. not before Sui dynasty (561 - 618 CE))
