= Inderite =

Nesoborate mineral

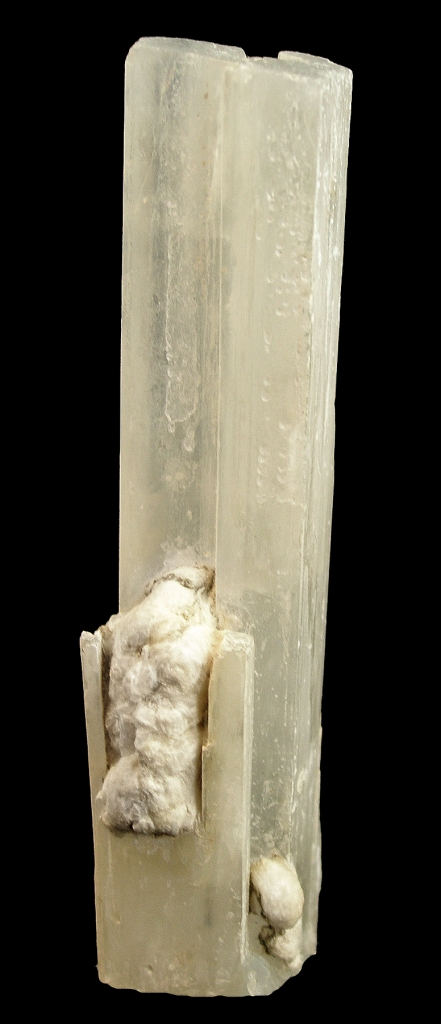

General
- Category: Minerals
- Formula: MgB_{3}O_{3}(OH)_{5} · 5H_{2}O
- IMA symbol: Idr
- Strunz classification: 6.CA.15
- Dana classification: 26.3.1.3
- Crystal system: Monoclinic
- Crystal class: Prismatic (2/m)
- Space group: P21/b
- Unit cell: 1,041.64 Å³

Identification
- Formula mass: 279.85
- Color: Colorless, white, pink; colorless in transmitted light
- Cleavage: Perfect on {010}, on {110̅} good
- Fracture: Uneven
- Mohs scale hardness: 2.5 – 3
- Luster: Vitreous, greasy, pearly, dull
- Diaphaneity: Transparent, translucent
- Density: 1.8
- Optical properties: Biaxial (+)
- Refractive index: n_{α} = 1.488 n_{β} = 1.491 n_{γ} = 1.505
- Birefringence: 0.017
- Pleochroism: None
- 2V angle: Measured 37°, calculated 52°
- Dispersion: Weak, r > v
- Ultraviolet fluorescence: None
- Solubility: Soluble in hydrochloric acid
- Other characteristics: Pearly on cleavages

Inderite, also known as lesserite, is a mineral that was named after its source, the Inder lake, near the Inder Mountains in Kazakhstan. The samples were described in English by the soviet mineralogist Boldyreva in 1937. It is a rare secondary mineral but common in salt, potassium and borate deposits.

== Crystallography ==
Inderite is a member of the inderite group, and a dimorph of kurnakovite. It contains boron, hydrogen, magnesium, and oxygen. It can form continuous layers. Deposits include Argentina, China, Italy, Kazakhstan, Russia, Turkey, and the US. It contains 8.69% magnesium, 11.59% boron, 5.40% hydrogen and 74.32% oxygen.

== Usage ==
Inderite is one of the natural borates commonly used in the chemical industry. This hydrated neotriborate is still used in iron metallurgy. It is also used in gemology despite its qualities. Since inderite is very soft, it is hard to cut, but sometimes a cabochon cut is possible. There are many cuttable sized specimens, and although there are only a few mines containing inderite, it is not considered a great rarity. After cutting, inderite's surface can become white and cloudy, hence why it needs to be dried and properly stored after cutting. It is cleaned with water after cutting as it is insoluble in water, but can be dissolved in hydrochloric acid.
