= List of European Union member states by population =

Map showing the member states of the European Union (clickable)

== Table ==
In coordination with member state national governments, Eurostat releases 1 January member state population figures every July; below are the 1 January 2025 data released in July 2025.

Country	Population (2025-01-01)	Population (% of EU)
Germany	83,577,100	18.6%
France	68,635,900	15.2%
Italy	58,934,200	13.1%
Spain	49,078,000	10.9%
Poland	36,497,500	8.1%
Romania	19,036,400	4.2%
Netherlands	18,044,000	4.0%
Belgium	11,900,100	2.6%
Czech Republic	10,909,500	2.4%
Portugal	10,749,600	2.4%
Sweden	10,587,700	2.4%
Greece	10,409,500	2.3%
Hungary	9,539,500	2.1%
Austria	9,197,200	2.0%
Bulgaria	6,437,400	1.4%
Denmark	5,992,700	1.3%
Finland	5,636,000	1.3%
Ireland	5,439,900	1.2%
Slovakia	5,419,500	1.2%
Croatia	3,874,400	0.9%
Lithuania	2,890,700	0.6%
Slovenia	2,130,900	0.5%
Latvia	1,856,900	0.4%
Estonia	1,370,000	0.3%
Cyprus	979,900	0.2%
Luxembourg	682,000	0.2%
Malta	574,300	0.1%
European Union	450,380,300	100.0%

== See also ==
- List of European Union member states by area
- List of European countries by population
