= Inderbor =

Inderbor Индербор Индерборский
- Town
- Location within Kazakhstan
- Coordinates: 48°33′26″N 51°45′04″E
- Country: Kazakhstan
- Region: Atyrau
- Elevation: 27 m (89 ft)

Population
  - Total: 13,254
- Time zone: UTC+05:00 (Kazakhstan Time)

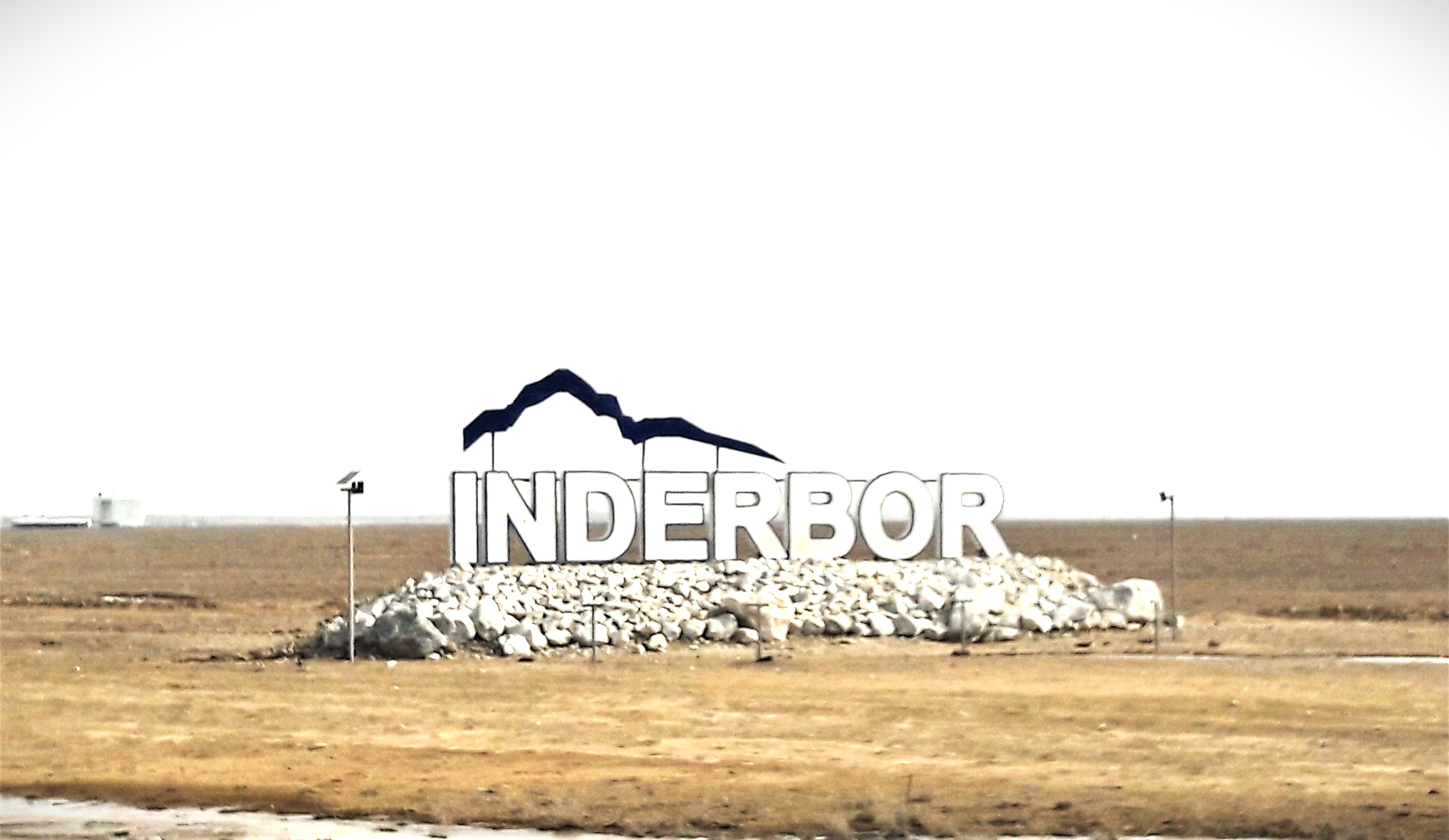
Inderborsky

Inderbor, also known as Inderborskiy, (Kazakh: Индербор, İnderbor, يندەربور; Russian: Индерборский, Inderborskiy) is a town in Atyrau Region, southwest Kazakhstan. It lies at an altitude of 27 m (89 ft) and has a population of 13,254.

== Geography ==
Inderbor is located 10 kilometers (6.2 mi) to the northwest of Inder lake.

=== Climate ===
Inderbor has a cold semi-arid climate (BSk) according to the Köppen climate classification.

Climate data for Inderbor (1991–2020)
| Month | Jan | Feb | Mar | Apr | May | Jun | Jul | Aug | Sep | Oct | Nov | Dec | Year |
|---|---|---|---|---|---|---|---|---|---|---|---|---|---|
| Mean daily maximum °C (°F) | −4.7 (23.5) | −3.2 (26.2) | 5.4 (41.7) | 17.4 (63.3) | 25.6 (78.1) | 31.3 (88.3) | 33.6 (92.5) | 32.1 (89.8) | 24.6 (76.3) | 15.2 (59.4) | 4.0 (39.2) | −2.8 (27.0) | 14.9 (58.8) |
| Daily mean °C (°F) | −8.4 (16.9) | −7.7 (18.1) | 0.2 (32.4) | 10.8 (51.4) | 18.8 (65.8) | 24.5 (76.1) | 26.9 (80.4) | 25.1 (77.2) | 17.7 (63.9) | 9.0 (48.2) | −0.1 (31.8) | −6.1 (21.0) | 9.2 (48.6) |
| Mean daily minimum °C (°F) | −11.7 (10.9) | −11.4 (11.5) | −3.8 (25.2) | 5.1 (41.2) | 12.4 (54.3) | 17.8 (64.0) | 20.1 (68.2) | 18.2 (64.8) | 11.4 (52.5) | 4.0 (39.2) | −3.2 (26.2) | −9.0 (15.8) | 4.2 (39.6) |
| Average precipitation mm (inches) | 16.4 (0.65) | 13.4 (0.53) | 16.6 (0.65) | 20.5 (0.81) | 24.0 (0.94) | 19.3 (0.76) | 13.3 (0.52) | 10.8 (0.43) | 13.4 (0.53) | 21.2 (0.83) | 17.5 (0.69) | 17.9 (0.70) | 204.3 (8.04) |
| Average precipitation days (≥ 1.0 mm) | 4.7 | 3.9 | 4.6 | 4.0 | 4.1 | 3.0 | 2.8 | 2.0 | 2.6 | 3.9 | 4.2 | 4.9 | 44.7 |
Source: NOAA
