= Inder District =

Inder
- District
- Индер ауданы
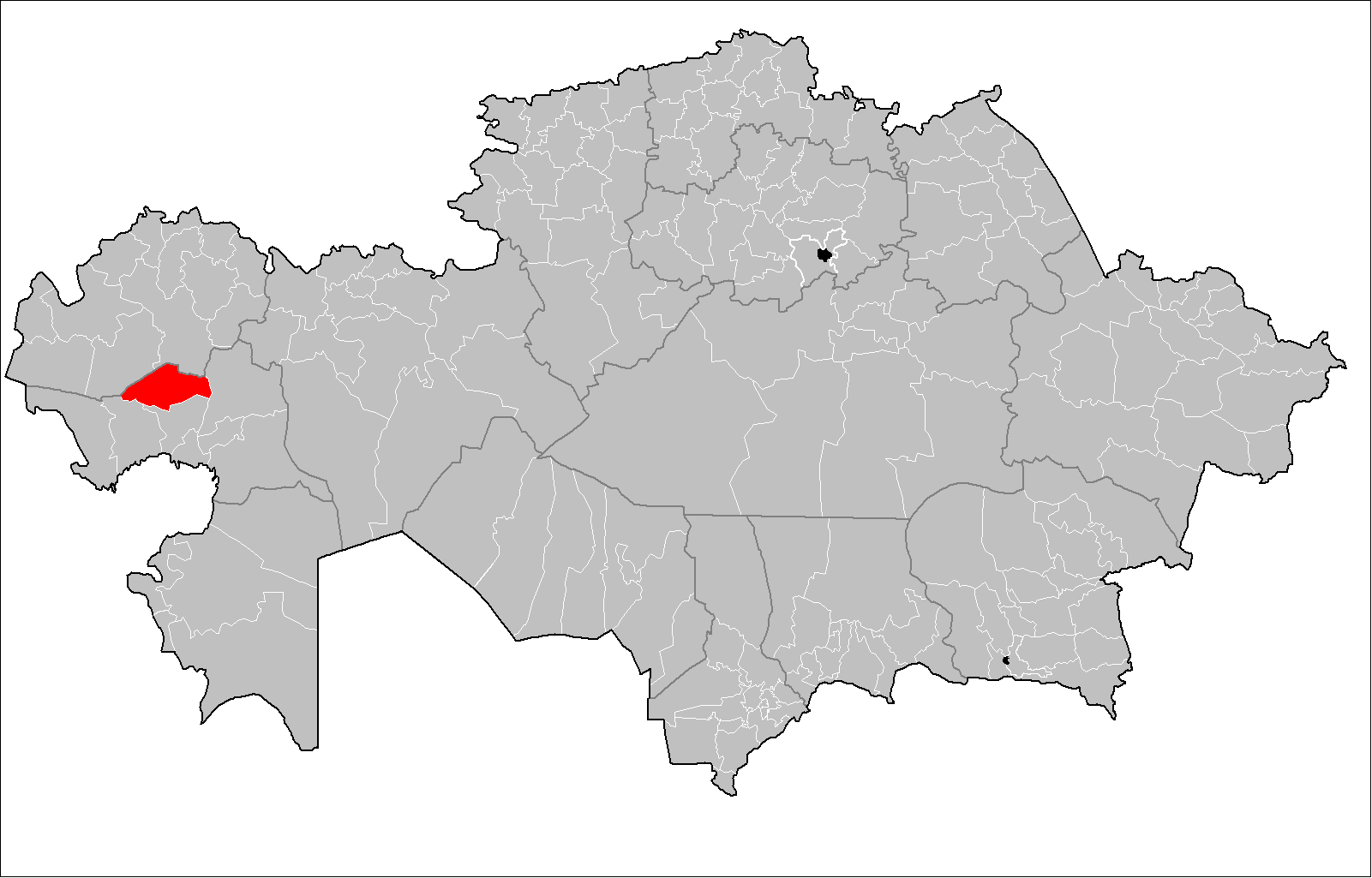
- Coordinates: 48°18′36″N 51°26′24″E
- Country: Kazakhstan
- Region: Atyrau Region
- Administrative center: Inderbor

Government
  - Akim: Shamuratov Daryn Dyusembayevich

Area
  - Total: 4,200 sq mi (10,900 km^{2})

Population (2013)
  - Total: 31,644
- Time zone: UTC+5 (West)

Inder District (Kazakh: Индер ауданы, Inder audany) is a district of Atyrau Region in Kazakhstan. The administrative center of the district is the urban-type settlement of Inderbor. Population: 31,644 (2013 estimate); 30,582 (2009 census results); 29,032 (1999 census results).

== Geography ==
Inder District lies in the Caspian Depression. The Ural river and its distributary Bagyrlai flow across the territory. Inder lake is located to the east of the Ural.
