= 2021 Atyrau regional election =

- 10 January 2021
- All 31 seats in the Atyrau Regional Mäslihat; 16 seats needed for a majority
- Turnout: 56.40%
Party	Leader	Vote %	Seats	+/–
Nur Otan	Amangeldi Abdolov	78.71%	25	New
Ak Zhol	Bektas Joldaev	8.79%	3	New
Auyl	EBauyrjan Ajğaliev	8.45%	3	New
This lists parties that won seats. See the complete results below.
Secretary before	Secretary after
Ömirzaq Zinullin; Nonpartisan	Älibek Näutiev; Nur Otan

Elections to the Atyrau Regional Mäslihat were held on 10 January 2021. Voters elected all 31 members of the Atyrau Regional Mäslihat for the first time using proportional representation system to allocate all the seats in the mäslihat.

The Nur Otan (NO) secured a majority of 25 seats while two parties Ak Zhol Democratic Party (AJ) and Auyl People's Democratic Patriotic Party (AUYL) had managed to secure to earn the certain required 7% electoral threshold to win each 3 seats.

== Background ==
Election date was set in October 2020 for all local and Mazhilis races, including the 31 seats in the Atyrau Regional Mäslihat as the 6th convocation's term was set to expire in January 2021. The new Regional Mäslihat was composed of party members elected through the newly implemented party-list proportional representation electoral system from 2018.

On 18 November 2020, the Atyrau Regional Branch of the Nur Otan party presented its list of candidates to the Regional Mäslihat as well as pre-election campaign with relation to the economy of the region.

== Parties ==
Four parties submitted their lists to the Atyrau Regional Electoral Commission which were registered by 12 December 2020.

Name		Ideology	No. 1 in party-list	No. of candidates
NO	Nur Otan	Big tent	Amangeldi Abdolov	47
AUYL	Auyl People's Democratic Patriotic Party	Agrarianism	Bektas Joldaev	6
AJ	Ak Zhol Democratic Party	Liberalism	Bauyrjan Ajğaliev	6
ADAL	Adal	Eco-socialism	Nurtas Baijanov	3

== Results ==
=== By district ===
District	Nur Otan		Ak Zhol		Auyl		Adal	
District	Votes	%	Votes	%	Votes	%	Votes	%
Atyrau	78,579	77.05%	9,018	8.84%	8,295	8.13%	6,091	5.97%
Zhylyoi	26,696	79.64%	3,077	9.18%	2,935	8.76%	812	2.42%
Inder	11,482	80.19%	1,028	7.18%	1,059	7.40%	749	5.23%
Isatay	9,172	80.36%	1,003	8.79%	1,034	9.06%	205	1.80%
Kurmangazy	20,701	79.95%	2,401	9.27%	2,300	8.88%	491	1.90%
Kyzylkoga	10,981	79.93%	1,191	8.67%	1,353	9.85%	214	1.56%
Makat	9,496	80.15%	1,030	8.69%	1,043	8.80%	279	2.35%
Makhambet	9,708	81.35%	1,007	8.44%	957	8.02%	262	2.20%
Atyrau Region	176,815	78.71%	19,755	8.79%	18,976	8.45%	9,103	4.05%

=== Overall ===
Party	Votes	%	Seats	+/–
Nur Otan	176,815	78.71	25	+25
Ak Zhol Democratic Party	19,755	8.79	3	+3
Auyl People's Democratic Patriotic Party	18,976	8.45	3	+3
Adal	9,103	4.05	0	0
Total	224,649	100.00	31	0
Valid votes	224,649	96.88		
Invalid/blank votes	7,233	3.12		
Total votes	231,882	100.00		
Registered voters/turnout	411,109	56.40		
Source: Atyrau Regional Election Commission

Popular vote
Nur Otan	78.71%
Ak Zhol	8.79%
Auyl	8.45%
Adal	4.05%

Mäslihat seats
Nur Otan	80.65%
Ak Zhol	9.68%
Auyl	9.68%
