= Taschagil =

Taschagil Тасшағыл Тасшагил تاسشاعىل
- Location within Kazakhstan
- Coordinates: 48°52′31″N 52°58′15″E
- Country: Kazakhstan
- Region: Atyrau
- Elevation: 16 m (52 ft)
- Time zone: UTC+5 (West Kazakhstan Time)
  - Summer (DST): UTC+5 (West Kazakhstan Time)

Taschagil, also known as Tasshagyl, (Kazakh: Тасшағыл, Tasşağyl, تاسشاعىل; Russian: Тасшагил, Tasshagil) is a town in Atyrau Region, west Kazakhstan. It lies at an altitude of 16 m (52 ft).
