= Dzhangil'dino =

Jangeldin Жангелдин Джангильдино جانگەلدين
- Location within Kazakhstan
- Coordinates: 48°57′29″N 53°44′10″E
- Country: Kazakhstan
- Region: Atyrau
- Elevation: 20 m (66 ft)
- Time zone: UTC+5 (West Kazakhstan Time)
  - Summer (DST): UTC+5 (West Kazakhstan Time)

Jangeldin (Kazakh: Жангелдин, جانگەلدين; Russian: Джангильдино, Dzhangil'dino) is a town in Atyrau Region, southwest Kazakhstan. It lies at an altitude of 20 m (66 ft).
