= Tangday =

Tangday Таңдай Тандай تاڭداي
- Location within Kazakhstan
- Coordinates: 47°32′58″N 51°31′01″E
- Country: Kazakhstan
- Region: Atyrau
- Elevation: −14 m (−46 ft)
- Time zone: UTC+5 (West Kazakhstan Time)
  - Summer (DST): UTC+5 (West Kazakhstan Time)

Tangday, also known as Tanday, (Kazakh: Таңдай, Tañdai, تاڭداي; Russian: Тандай, Tanday) is a town in Atyrau Region, west Kazakhstan. It lies at an altitude of 14 m (46 ft) below sea level.
