= Biikzhal =

Biikzhal Биікжал بيىكجال
- Location within Kazakhstan
- Coordinates: 46°47′54″N 54°43′07″E
- Country: Kazakhstan
- Region: Atyrau
- Elevation: 7 m (23 ft)

Population
  - Total: 828
- Time zone: UTC+5 (West Kazakhstan Time)
  - Summer (DST): UTC+5 (West Kazakhstan Time)

Biikzhal (Kazakh: Биікжал, Biıkjal, بيىكجال) is an abandoned town in Atyrau Region, southwest Kazakhstan. It lies at an altitude of 7 m (23 ft).
