= Kudryashovo =

Kudryashovo Кудряшов Кудряшово كۋدرياشوۆ
- Location within Kazakhstan
- Coordinates: 46°31′14″N 48°47′43″E
- Country: Kazakhstan
- Region: Atyrau
- Elevation: −18 m (−59 ft)
- Time zone: UTC+5 (West Kazakhstan Time)
  - Summer (DST): UTC+5 (West Kazakhstan Time)

Kudryashovo, also known as Kudryashov, (Kazakh: Кудряшов, Kudriaşov, كۋدرياشوۆ; Russian: Кудряшово, Kudryashovo) is a town in Atyrau Region, west Kazakhstan. It lies at an altitude of 18 m (59 ft) below sea level.
