= Baychunas =

Baychunas Байшонас بەيشۋناس
- Location within Kazakhstan
- Coordinates: 47°14′29″N 52°56′28″E
- Country: Kazakhstan
- Region: Atyrau
- Date of abolition: 2013
- Elevation: −24 m (−79 ft)

Population (2026)
  - Total: 0
- Time zone: UTC+5 (West Kazakhstan Time)
  - Summer (DST): UTC+5 (West Kazakhstan Time)

Baychunas (also known as Bayshonas (Kazakh: Байшонас, Baişonas, بەيشۋناس)) is a abandoned town in Atyrau Region, southwest Kazakhstan. It lies at an altitude of 24 m (79 ft) below sea level. It had a population of 1,864. It was the administrative center and the only settlement of the Baichunas rural district. Abolished in 2013.
