= Zhanbay =

Zhanbay Жанбай جانباي
- Location within Kazakhstan
- Coordinates: 47°02′17″N 50°48′27″E
- Country: Kazakhstan
- Region: Atyrau
- Elevation: −22 m (−72 ft)
- Time zone: UTC+5 (West Kazakhstan Time)
  - Summer (DST): UTC+5 (West Kazakhstan Time)

Zhanbay (Kazakh: Жанбай, Janbay, جانباي) is a town in Atyrau Region, western Kazakhstan. It lies at an altitude of 22 m (72 ft) below sea level, on the coast of the Caspian Sea.
