= Zhastalap =

Zhastalap Жасталап Jastalap جاستالاپ
- Location within Kazakhstan
- Coordinates: 46°33′52″N 48°40′56″E
- Country: Kazakhstan
- Region: Atyrau
- Elevation: 1 m (3.3 ft)
- Time zone: UTC+5 (West Kazakhstan Time)
  - Summer (DST): UTC+5 (West Kazakhstan Time)

Zhastalap (Kazakh: Жасталап, Jastalap, جاستالاپ), previously Gangyushkino (Russian: Гангюшкино, Gangyushkino), is a town in Atyrau Region, southwest Kazakhstan. It lies at an altitude of 1 m (3.3 ft).
