= Kulagino =

Kulagino Есбол Кулагино ەسبول
- Location within Kazakhstan
- Coordinates: 48°22′15″N 51°33′32″E
- Country: Kazakhstan
- Region: Atyrau
- Elevation: −7 m (−23 ft)
- Time zone: UTC+5 (West Kazakhstan Time)
  - Summer (DST): UTC+5 (West Kazakhstan Time)

Esbol (Kazakh: Есбол, Esbol, ەسبول), previously Kulagin or Kulagino (Russian: Кулагино, Kulagino) is a town in Atyrau Region, west Kazakhstan. It lies at an altitude of 7 m (23 ft) below sea level.
