= Kzyloba =

Kzyloba Кызылоба
- Location within Kazakhstan
- Coordinates: 46°37′50″N 48°53′10″E
- Country: Kazakhstan
- Region: Atyrau
- Elevation: −10 m (−33 ft)
- Time zone: UTC+5 (West Kazakhstan Time)
  - Summer (DST): UTC+5 (West Kazakhstan Time)

Kzyloba, also known as Kyzyloba, (Kazakh: Қызылоба, Qyzyloba; Russian: Кызылоба, Kyzyloba) is a town in Atyrau Region, west Kazakhstan. It lies at an altitude of 10 m (33 ft) below sea level.
