= Ashysai Settlement =

Ashysai settlement
- Interactive map of Ashysai settlement
- 47°28.789′N 51°32.289′E
- Location: Atyrau Region, Makhambet District, Kazakhstan

Ashysai is a medieval city. The monument is included in the preliminary list of objects of historical and cultural heritage of the Atyrau Region.

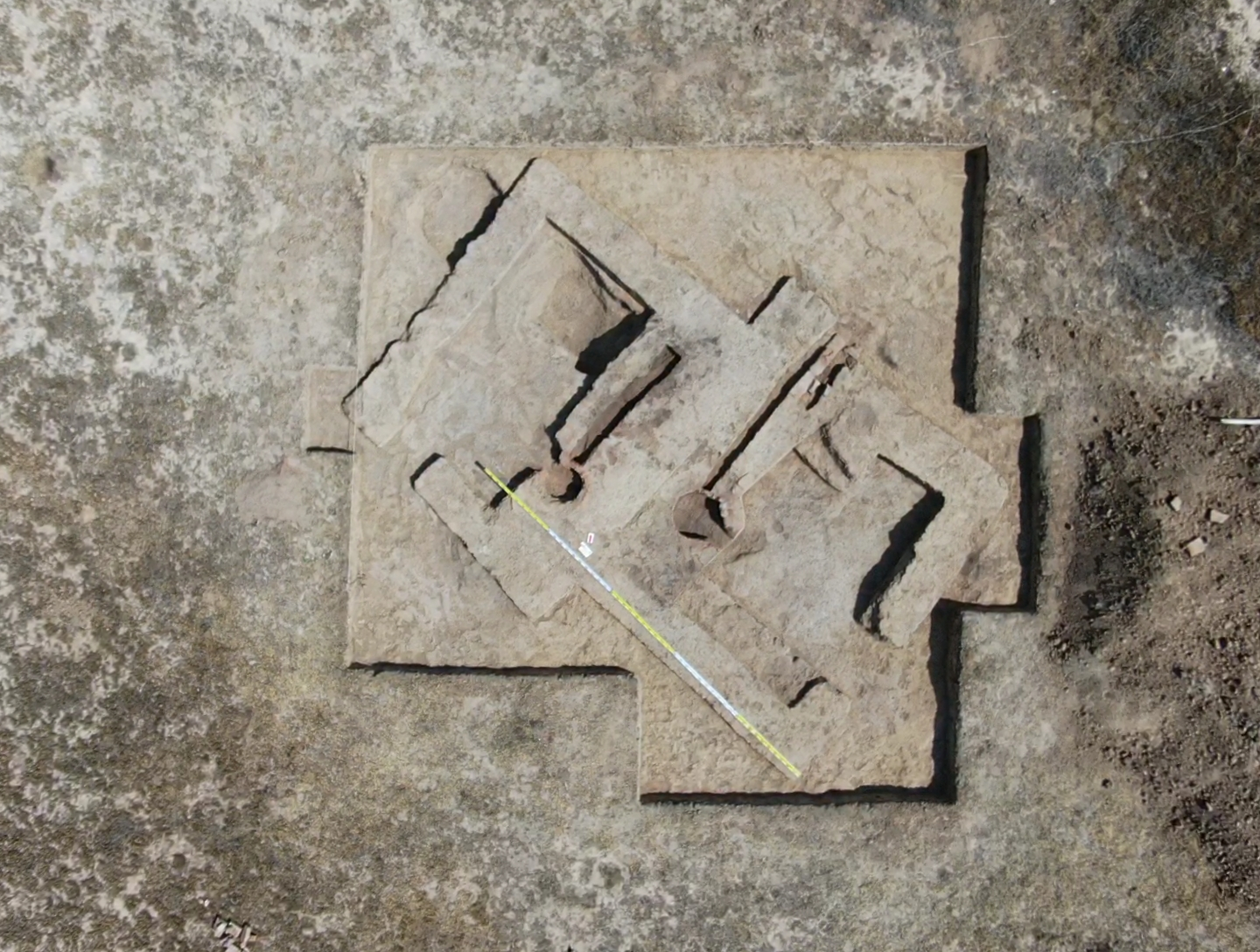
Ashysai Settlement

== Location ==
The Ashysai settlement is located in the Atyrau Region, Makhambet District, 15 km west of the village of Saraishyq, on the left bank of the Ashysai (Solyanka) channel. The monument is situated within the territory of the Baksai Rural District of Makhambet District. GPS coordinates: N 47° 28.789′; E 51° 32.289′.

== Archaeological research ==
The settlement was first identified in 2021 by an archaeological expedition of the "Saraishyq" Museum-Reserve during the implementation of the program "Golden Horde Cities, Caravan Routes and Caravanserais in Western Kazakhstan: Interdisciplinary Research (XIII-XV Centuries)".

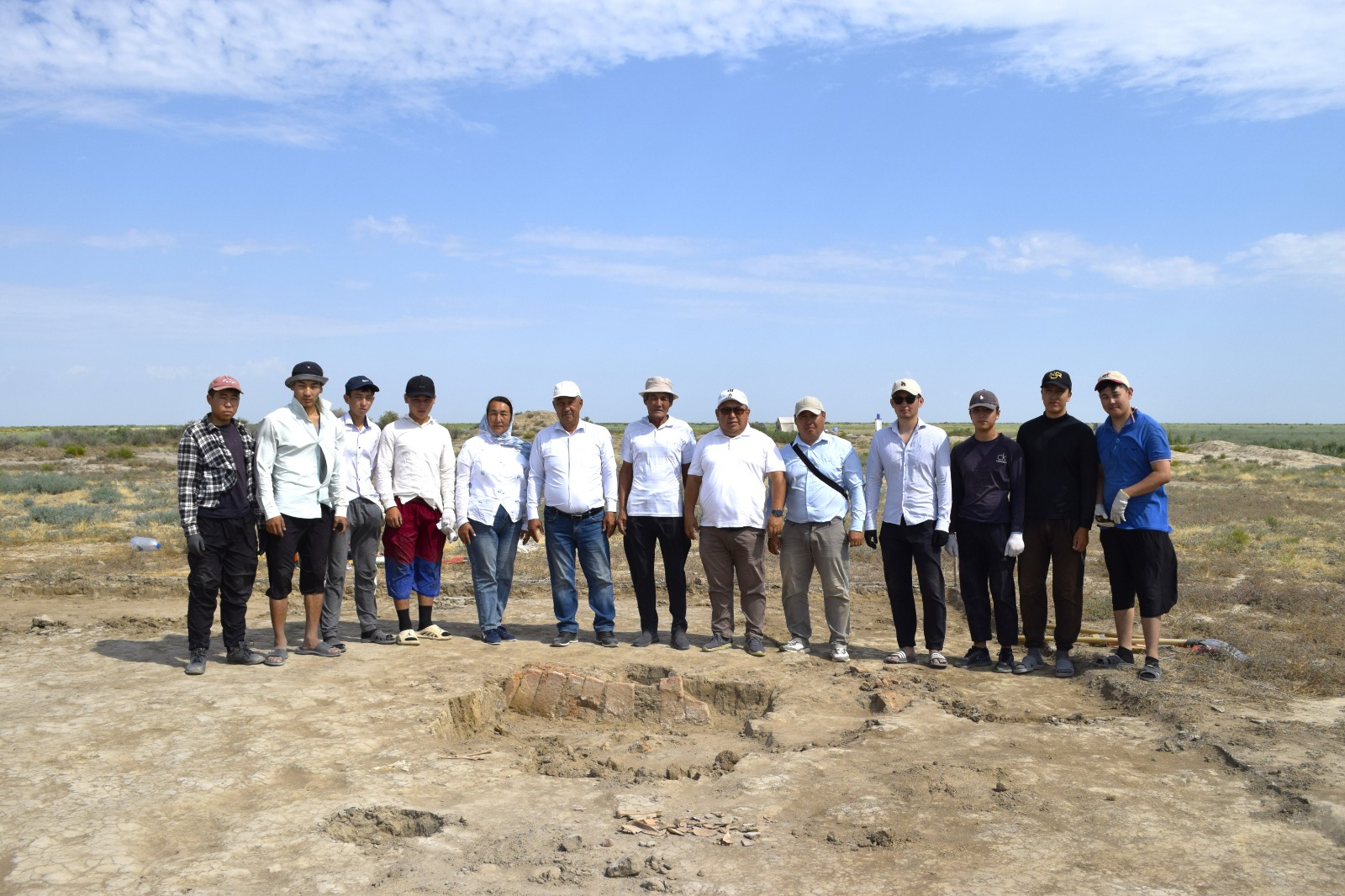
Archaeological Expedition of the State Historical and Cultural Museum-Reserve "Saraishyq" to the Ashysai Settlement, 2024

The area of the Ashysai settlement is approximately 300 × 700 m. On the surface of the monument, fragments of ceramic vessels, animal bones, and pieces of metal were recorded. Fragments of glazed ceramics are found in small quantities. Blue color was widely used on them. The ceramic vessels were made on a potter's wheel from red clay; the outer surface is decorated with rectilinear and zigzag ornamentation. Several copper coins were discovered, attributed to the mints of Uzbek Khan and Janibek Khan.

As a result of the excavations, ceramic vessels and their fragments characteristic of the Golden Horde period were found, along with coins minted by the khans of the Ulus of Jochi, glass beads, bone artifacts, and a large quantity of bones from domestic animals and fish. The regular discovery of fish bones testifies to the important role of fish in the diet of Ashysai's inhabitants. The found chigir (water-lifting device) vessels suggest that the city's population was engaged in horticulture and melon growing.

== Sources ==
- Golden Horde Sites of Saraishyq, Ushkan, Ashysai, and Karagaily in the Context of Historical and Cultural Heritage (13th–15th Centuries)
- Excavations in the Ashysai Settlement
- Kazakhstani Archaeologists Have Discovered a Sensational Find in the Atyrau Region
- Archaeologists Have Discovered a Golden Horde–Era Caravanserai in Atyrau
