= Eskene =

Eskene Ескене Искининский ەسكەنە
- Town
- Location within Kazakhstan
- Coordinates: 47°13′02″N 52°38′01″E
- Country: Kazakhstan
- Region: Atyrau
- Established: 1938
- Date of abolition: 2013
- Elevation: −30 m (−98 ft)

Population (2026)
  - Total: 0
- Time zone: UTC+5 (West Kazakhstan Time)
  - Summer (DST): UTC+5 (West Kazakhstan Time)

Eskene (Kazakh: Ескене, Eskene, ەسكەنە), also known as Iskininskiy (Russian: Искининский, Iskininskiy) is a abandoned town in Atyrau Region, southwest Kazakhstan. It lies at an altitude of 30 m (98 ft) below sea level. It was the administrative center and the only settlement of the Iskeninsky rural district. KATO code — 235237100. Abolished in 2013.
