= Shortanbay =

Shortanbay Шортанбай Шортанбай شورتانباي
- Location within Kazakhstan
- Coordinates: 46°36′37″N 48°39′19″E
- Country: Kazakhstan
- Region: Atyrau
- Elevation: −11 m (−36 ft)
- Time zone: UTC+5 (West Kazakhstan Time)
  - Summer (DST): UTC+5 (West Kazakhstan Time)

Shortanbay (Kazakh: Шортанбай, Şortanbai, شورتانباي; Russian: Шортанбай, Shortanbay) is a town in Atyrau Region, west Kazakhstan. It lies at an altitude of 11 m (36 ft) below sea level.
