= Bogatoye, Kazakhstan =

Bogatoye Богатое بوگاتوە
- Location within Kazakhstan
- Coordinates: 46°30′08″N 48°57′33″E
- Country: Kazakhstan
- Region: Atyrau
- Elevation: −32 m (−105 ft)
- Time zone: UTC+5 (West Kazakhstan Time)
  - Summer (DST): UTC+5 (West Kazakhstan Time)

Bogatoye, also known as Bogatyy, (Kazakh: Богатое, Bogatoe, بوگاتوە) is a town in Atyrau Region, southwest Kazakhstan. It lies at an altitude of 32 m (105 ft) below sea level.
