= Bolat Aqşolaqov =

Kazakh politician (born 1971)

- Болат Ақшолақов
- Aqşolaqov in 2026

Äkim of Atyrau Region
- Incumbent
- Assumed office 17 July 2026
- President: Kassym-Jomart Tokayev
- Preceded by: Serik Şapkenov

Aide to the president of Kazakhstan
- In office 4 April 2023 – 13 February 2025
- President: Kassym-Jomart Tokayev
- Succeeded by: Magzum Myrzagaliev

Minister of Energy
- In office 11 January 2022 – 4 April 2023
- President: Kassym-Jomart Tokayev
- Prime Minister: Älihan Smaiylov
- Preceded by: Magzum Myrzagaliev
- Succeeded by: Almasadam Sätqaliev

Personal details
- Born: 9 April 1971 (age 55) Guryev, Guryev Oblast, Kazakh SSR, Soviet Union

Bolat Oralūly Aqşolaqov (Note: Often transliterated as Bulat Uralovich Akchulakov through a Russified Romanization of Булат Уралович Акчулаков.) (Kazakh: Болат Оралұлы Ақшолақов, [boˈɫɑtʔ ʷɔˈrɑɫ.o̙ɫɯ ɑqʂɔˈɫɑqɯf]; born 9 April 1971) is a Kazakh politician who is currently serving as akim of Atyrau Region since 2026. Aqşolaqov used to serve as the minister of energy from 2022 to 2023 and chairman of Kazenergy from 2025 to 2026.

During the "Dialogue Organization on Asian Cooperation" seminar held on 6 October 2006, Aqşolaqov said Kazakhstan has 4.8 billion tons of oil, 3.4 trillion cubic meters of gas, and 8 billion tons of oil in the Caspian Sea. Aqşolaqov expressed his belief that by 2010, Kazakhstan's oil output to 84 million tons and its gas output to 50 billion cubic meters.

From 4 April 2023 to 13 February 2025, he was an advisor to the president of Kazakhstan.

From 14 February 2025, he was the chairman of Kazenergy.

On July 17, 2026, Bolat Aqşolaqov and Daryn Şamuratov, deputy akim of the Atyrau Region, were proposed as candidates for the post of akim of the Atyrau Region. Aqşolaqov received 83 of 101 members of local maslihat votes and by president Tokayev's decree No. 1369, he was appointed to the post.

== Awards and honors ==
Aqşolaqov's awards and honors include:

- Medal "10 Years of Astana" (2008)
- Medal "20 Years of Independence of Kazakhstan" (2011)
- Badge "For Contribution to the Development of the Oil and Gas Industry of Kazakhstan" (2013)
- Order of Kurmet by a decree of the president of Kazakhstan (2014).
