= Sorkol (village) =

Sorkol Соркөл
- Village
- Location in Kazakhstan
- Coordinates: 48°28′12″N 54°27′02″E
- Country: Kazakhstan
- Region: Atyrau Region
- District: Kyzylkoga District

Population (2009)
  - Total: 151
- Time zone: UTC+5

Sorkol (Kazakh: Соркөл) is a village in Kyzylkoga District, Atyrau Region, Kazakhstan. It is part of the Mukyr Rural District (KATO code - 234847600). Population: 151 (2009 census results); 257 (1999 census results).

== Geography ==
The village lies 65 kilometers (40 mi) to the southeast of Miyaly.
