= Mikil =

Mikil Микиль
- Location within Kazakhstan
- Coordinates: 46°37′00″N 49°19′00″E
- Country: Kazakhstan
- Region: Atyrau
- Elevation: −25 m (−82 ft)
- Time zone: UTC+5 (West Kazakhstan Time)
  - Summer (DST): UTC+5 (West Kazakhstan Time)

Mikil (Russian: Микиль, Mikil') is a town in Atyrau Region, western Kazakhstan. It lies at an altitude of 25 m (82 ft) below sea level.
