= Sarytoghay =

Sarytoghay Сарытоғай Сарытогай سارىتوعاي
- Location within Kazakhstan
- Coordinates: 47°43′07″N 51°34′36″E
- Country: Kazakhstan
- Region: Atyrau
- Elevation: −7 m (−23 ft)

Population
  - Total: 14,082
- Time zone: UTC+5 (West Kazakhstan Time)
  - Summer (DST): UTC+5 (West Kazakhstan Time)

Sarytoghay, also known as Sarytogay, (Kazakh: Сарытоғай, Sarytoğai, سارىتوعاي; Russian: Сарытогай, Sarytogay) is a town in Atyrau Region, west Kazakhstan. It lies at an altitude of 7 m (23 ft) below sea level.
