= Qaragaily settlement =

- Qaraǵaıly; Karagaily
- Interactive map of Qaragaily settlement
- 47°24.544′N 51°29.187′E
- Location: Atyrau Region, Makhambet District, Kazakhstan

Qaragaily (Qaraǵaıly or Karagaily) is a medieval city in Kazakhstan. The monument is included in the preliminary list of objects of historical and cultural heritage of the Atyrau Region.

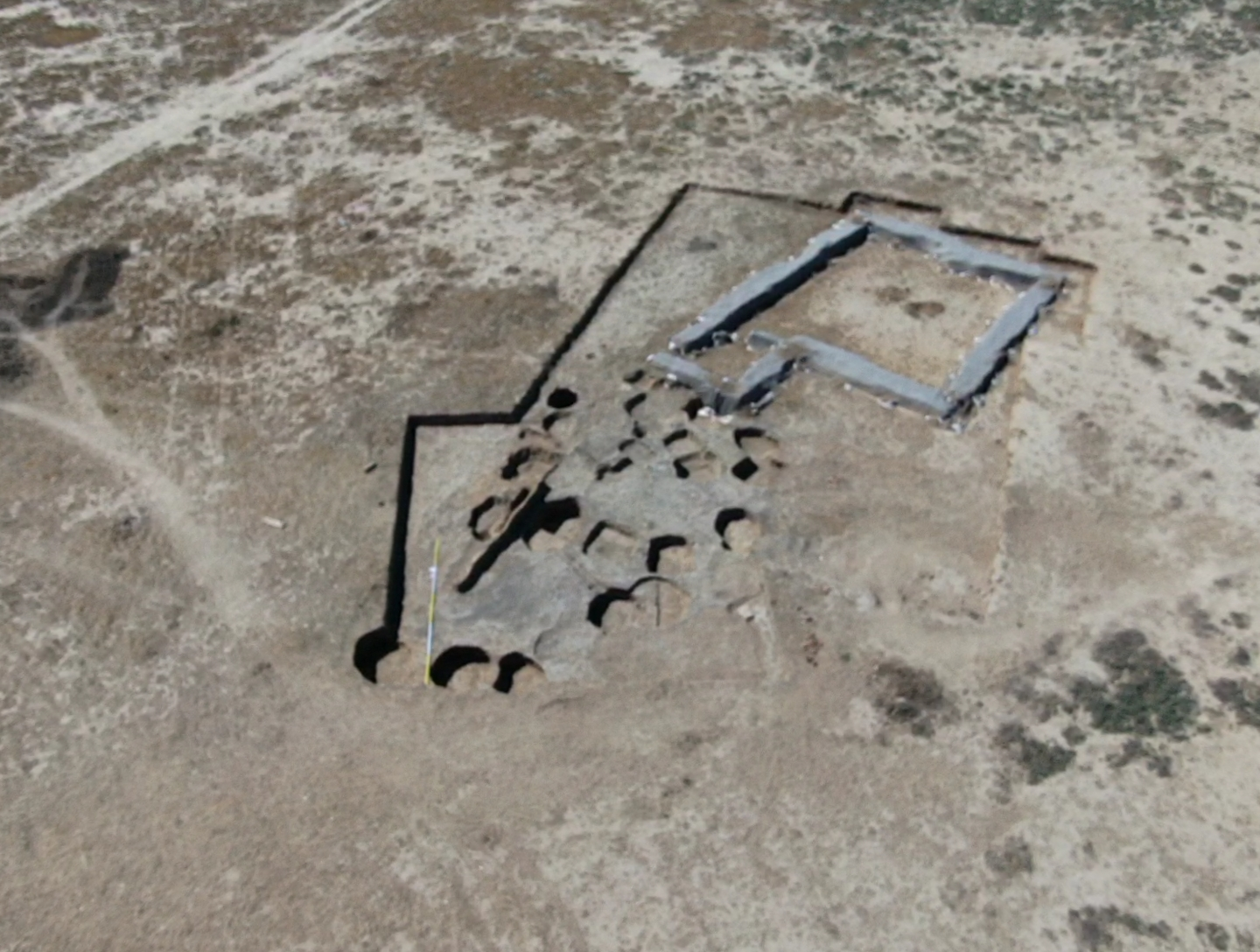
Qaragaily Settlement

== Location ==
The Qaragaily settlement is located in the Atyrau Region, Makhambet District: 20 km west of the village of Saraishyq and 15 km south of the village of Tandai, on the old riverbed of the Ashysai (Solyanka) channel. GPS coordinates: N 47°24,544′; E 51°29,187′.

The total area of the monument, considering all objects, is about 1000 × 1000 m.

== Name ==
According to local residents, the name "Qaraǵaıly" is associated with a bridge that existed here in the past, built from pine (қарағай/qaraǵaı) logs Among the people, different variants of the name for this land are heard: "Қарағай көпір/Qaraǵaı kópir" (pine bridge), "Қарағай/Qaraǵaı" (pine) or "Қарағайлы/Qaraǵaıly" (pine). The medieval name of the city has not yet been established.

== Archaeological research ==
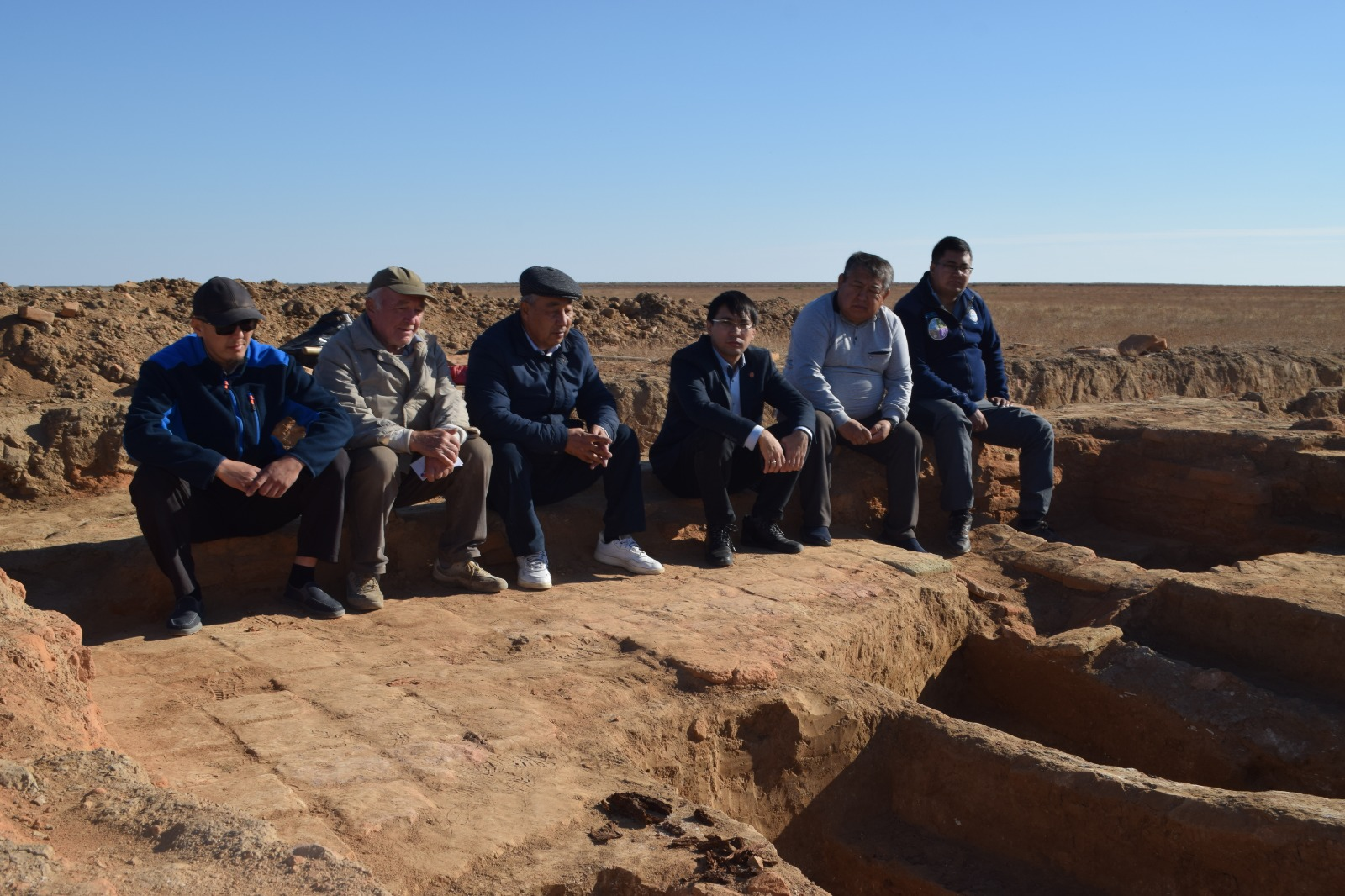
Archaeologists of the Saraishyq State Historical and Cultural Museum-Reserve during an expedition to the Qaragaily settlement, 2023

The settlement was first identified by an archaeological expedition of the Saraishyq Museum-Reserve in 2022 during exploratory work within the program "Golden Horde Cities, Caravan Routes and Caravanserais in Western Kazakhstan: Interdisciplinary Research (XIII-XV Centuries)". During the survey, decorative jade overlays and copper puls (coins) issued in the name of Uzbek Khan were discovered on the surface of the monument. The presence of copper coins indicates the city's location on a trade-caravan route, developed commodity-money relations, and the existence of a market. On both sides of the Ashysai channel, numerous fragments of ceramic tableware, pieces of metal products, and animal bones were recorded. Among the ceramics, fragments of unglazed red-clay pottery decorated with straight and zigzag lines predominate. Parts of chigir (water-lifting device) vessels were discovered, suggesting the existence of irrigated cultivation: using water-lifting devices, water from the Ashysai channel was raised to irrigate gardens and vegetable plots. Along with red-clay ceramics, glazed pottery was also used, predominantly with blue glaze. Some vessels were made from kashin (stonepaste) mass, with ornamentation executed using the "reserve" technique. Fragments of stamped pottery made from gray clay are also found. Furthermore, on the surface of the monument, alongside medieval finds, stone tools were discovered: flakes, microliths

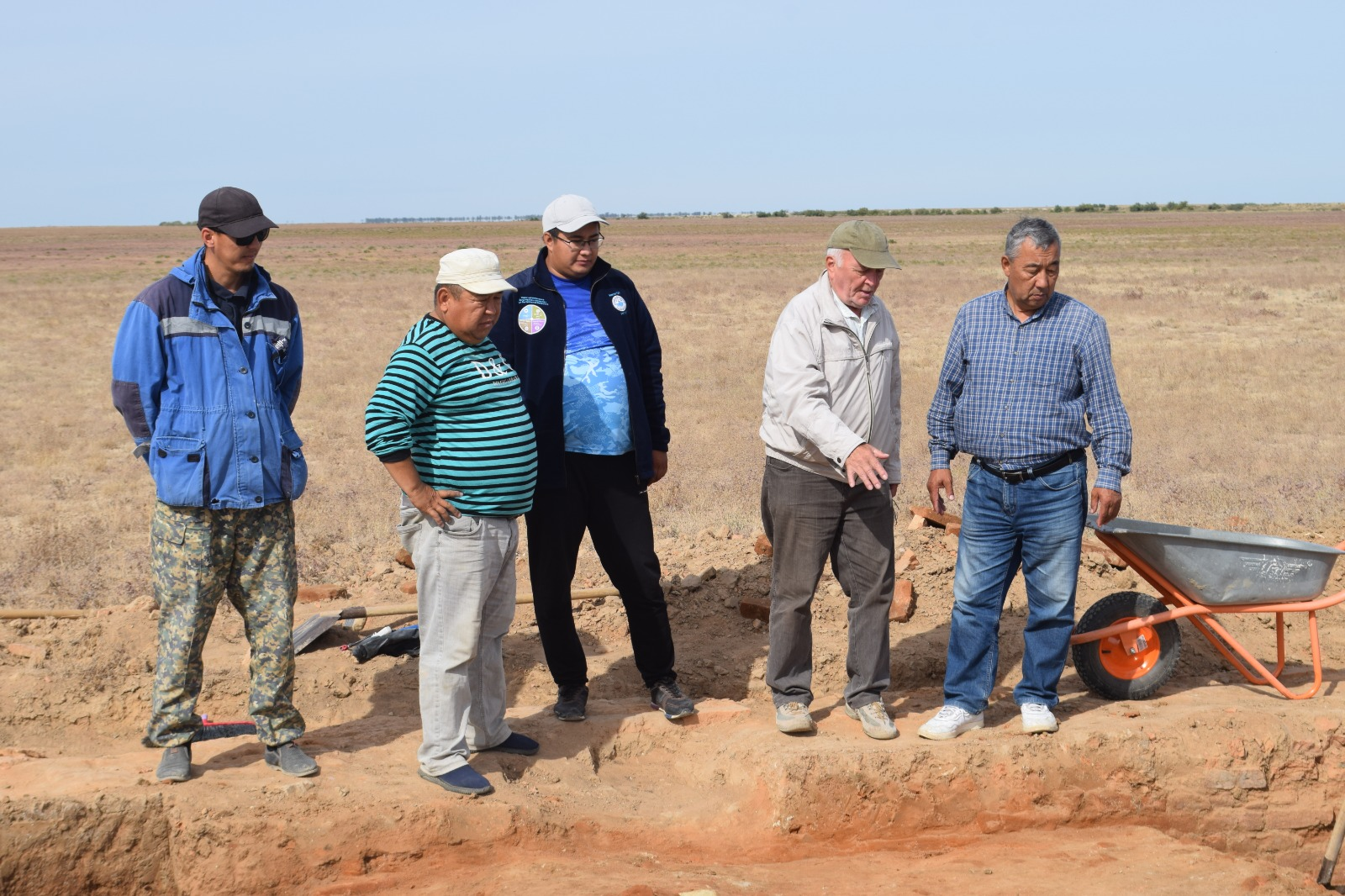
Archaeological expedition of the Saraishyq State Historical and Cultural Museum-Reserve to the Qaragaily settlement, 2023

In the western part of the settlement, there are small rounded elevations. Excavations of one such elevation, about 40 cm high, revealed the remains of a medieval mausoleum, the walls of which were built from baked and sun-dried bricks. The mausoleum consisted of two rooms. The portal is oriented to the south, and the corners are decorated with pilasters. The small entrance room (ziyaratkhana) measures 4.8 × 2.4 m, and the main room—the burial vault (gurkhana)—measures 4.8 × 4.8 m.The walls are constructed using "armor" masonry: the inner part is made of sun-dried brick, and the outer part is faced with baked brick. The floors of both rooms were paved with brick.

A total of six burials were identified in the mausoleum. In the central part of the burial vault, there were two burials—a man and a woman—conducted in a lyakhada (a grave with a niche). In the northeastern corner of the female burial, a red-clay ceramic jug was found. On the right shoulder of the female skeleton, a fragment of fabric with silver threads and gilding was preserved. Presumably, this is part of a headdress—a netted band for holding hair, made from cotton, silk threads, and gilding. Radiocarbon analysis showed that the age of the sample taken from the male burial dates to 1222–1285 AD with 95.4% probability, and the female burial to 1229–1305 AD. Thus, the mausoleum dates to the 13th century.

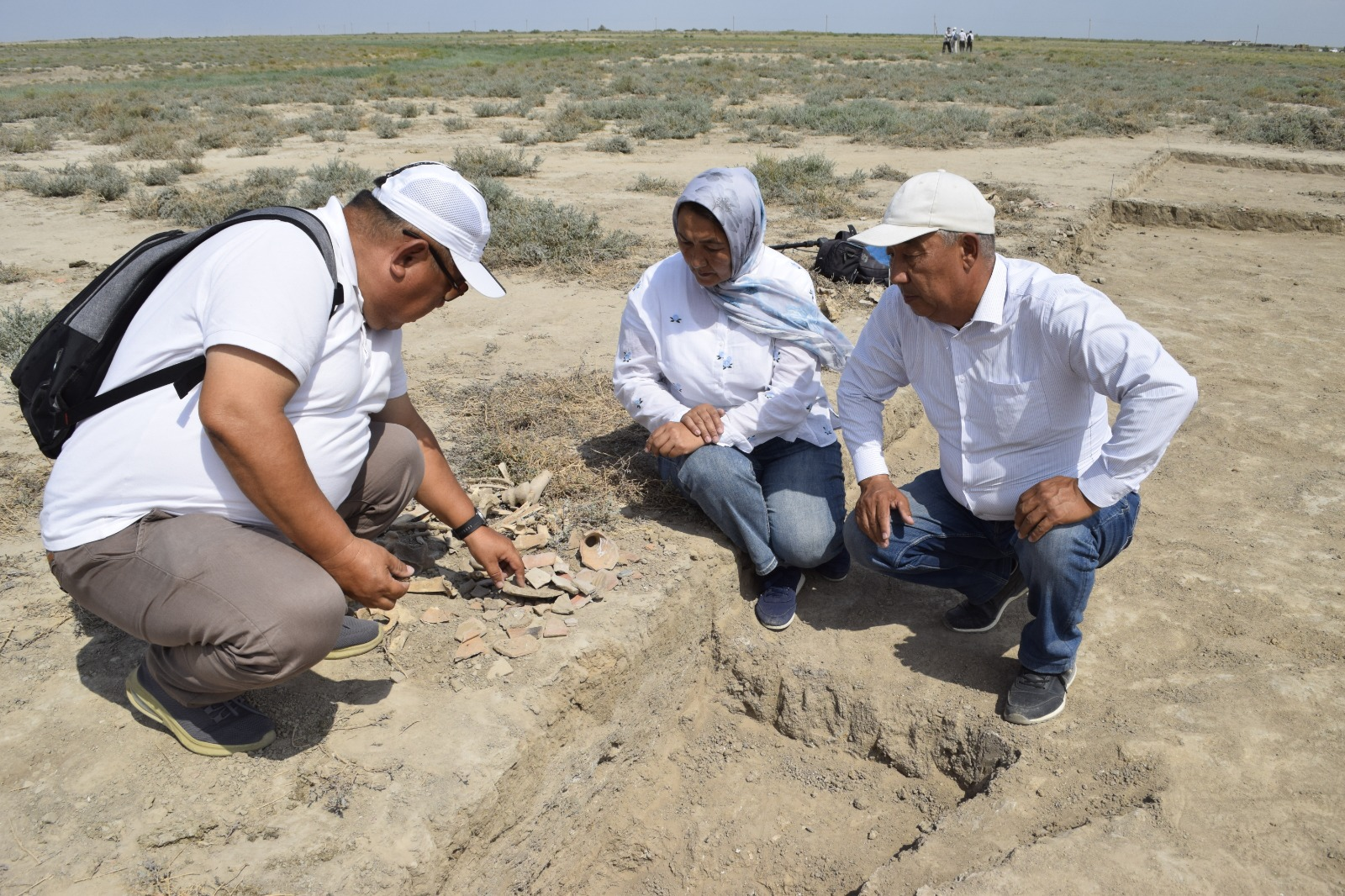
From left to right: archaeologist and expedition leader A. Turaruly, Doctor of History U. Tulegenova, Doctor of History A. Muktar. Qaragaily, 2024.

The results of stable isotope analysis indicate that the inhabitants of Qaragaily actively consumed meat and dairy products in their daily lives. The excavations also recorded a high dependence of the population on livestock products and fish from freshwater bodies, indicating the preservation of a meat-and-dairy-oriented economy in the region.

About 30 coins were found at Qaragaily, evidencing stable monetary relations.

The type of structure revealed during the excavations corresponds to the typical plan of early mosques.
