= Komsomol, Atyrau =

Komsomol Комсомол Комсомольский كومسومول
- Location within Kazakhstan
- Coordinates: 47°19′12″N 53°39′55″E
- Country: Kazakhstan
- Region: Atyrau
- Elevation: −22 m (−72 ft)
- Time zone: UTC+5 (West Kazakhstan Time)
  - Summer (DST): UTC+5 (West Kazakhstan Time)

Komsomol (Kazakh: Комсомол, Komsomol, كومسومول), also known as Komsomol'skiy, (Russian: Комсомольский, Komsomol'skiy) is a town in Atyrau Region, west Kazakhstan. It lies at an altitude of 22 m (72 ft) below sea level.
