= Suyindik =

Suyindik Сүйіндік Суюндук سۇيىندىك
- Location within Kazakhstan
- Coordinates: 48°07′55″N 47°40′07″E
- Country: Kazakhstan
- Region: Atyrau
- Elevation: −9 m (−30 ft)
- Time zone: UTC+5 (West Kazakhstan Time)
  - Summer (DST): UTC+5 (West Kazakhstan Time)

Suyindik (Kazakh: Сүйіндік, Süiındık, سۇيىندىك; Russian: Суюндук, Suyunduk) is a town in Atyrau Region, west Kazakhstan. It lies at an altitude of 9 m (30 ft) below sea level.
