= Azghyr =

Azghyr Азғыр ازعير
- Location within Kazakhstan
- Coordinates: 47°50′12″N 47°54′44″E
- Country: Kazakhstan
- Region: Atyrau
- Elevation: 4 m (13 ft)
- Time zone: UTC+5 (West Kazakhstan Time)
  - Summer (DST): UTC+5 (West Kazakhstan Time)

Azghyr, also known as Azgir, (Kazakh: Азғыр, Azğyr, ازعير) is a village in Atyrau Region, southwest Kazakhstan. It lies at an altitude of 4 m (13 ft).
