= Koschagyl =

Koschagyl Қосшағыл قوسشاعىل
- Location within Kazakhstan
- Coordinates: 46°50′45″N 53°48′17″E
- Country: Kazakhstan
- Region: Atyrau
- Elevation: −24 m (−79 ft)
- Time zone: UTC+5 (West Kazakhstan Time)
  - Summer (DST): UTC+5 (West Kazakhstan Time)

Koschagyl, also known as Qosshaghyl, (Kazakh: Қосшағыл, Qosşağyl, قوسشاعىل) is a town in Atyrau Region, southwest Kazakhstan. It lies at an altitude of 24 m (79 ft) below sea level.
