= Yerkinkala =

Yerkinkala Еркинкала ەركينكالا
- Location within Kazakhstan
- Coordinates: 47°00′00″N 51°48′00″E
- Country: Kazakhstan
- Region: Atyrau
- Elevation: −23 m (−75 ft)
- Time zone: UTC+5 (West Kazakhstan Time)
  - Summer (DST): UTC+5 (West Kazakhstan Time)

Yerkinkala (Kazakh: Еркинкала, Yerkinkala, ەركينكالا) is a town in Atyrau Region, western Kazakhstan, 2 km (1.2 mi) southwest of the regional capital of Atyrau. It lies at an altitude of 23 m (75 ft) below sea level.
