= Konystanu =

Konystanu Қоныстану Коныстану قونىستانۋ
- Location within Kazakhstan
- Coordinates: 48°50′30″N 53°20′44″E
- Country: Kazakhstan
- Region: Atyrau
- Elevation: 23 m (75 ft)
- Time zone: UTC+5 (West Kazakhstan Time)
  - Summer (DST): UTC+5 (West Kazakhstan Time)

Konystanu, also known as Qonystanu, (Kazakh: Қоныстану, Qonystanu, قونىستانۋ; Russian: Коныстану, Konystanu) is a town in Atyrau Region, west Kazakhstan. It lies at an altitude of 23 m (75 ft).
