= Tuyyq =

Tuyyq Тұйық تۇيىق
- Location within Kazakhstan
- Coordinates: 43°05′47″N 79°23′53″E
- Country: Kazakhstan
- Region: Atyrau
- Elevation: 1,938 m (6,358 ft)
- Time zone: UTC+6 (East Kazakhstan Time)
  - Summer (DST): UTC+6 (East Kazakhstan Time)

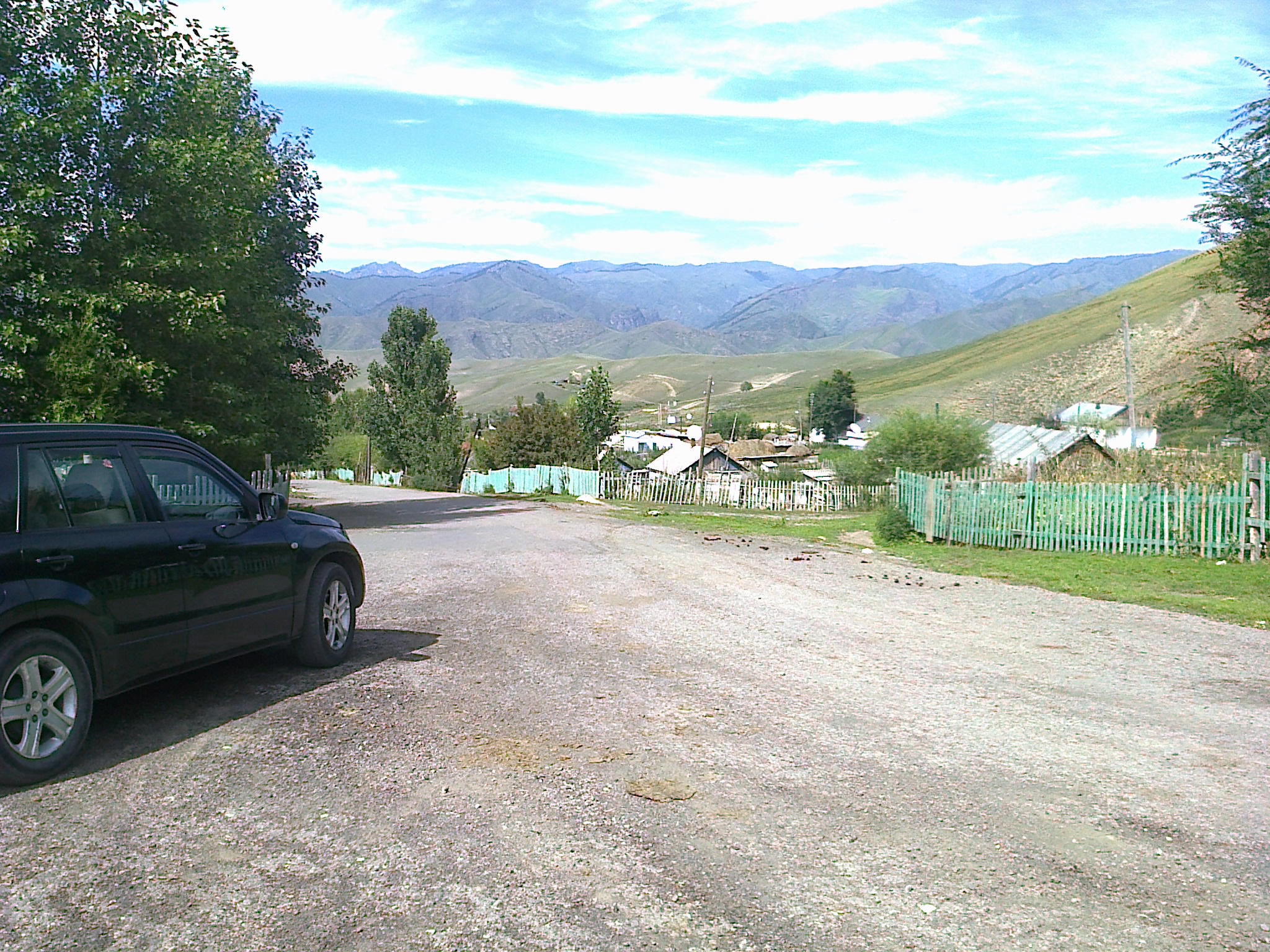

Tuyyq (Kazakh: Тұйық, Tūiyq, تۇيىق), also known as Tuyuk, is a town in Almaty Region, southeastern Kazakhstan. It lies at an altitude of 1,938 m (6,358 ft).
