= Sorkol =

Sorkol (Kazakh: Соркөл) may refer to:

- Sorkol (village), a village in Kyzylkoga District, Kazakhstan
- Sorkol (Chu basin), a lake in Sarysu District, Kazakhstan
- Sorkol, Fyodorov District, a lake in the Kostanay Region, Kazakhstan
