= Serik Şapkenov =

Kazakh politician (born 1979)

Serik Shapkenov
- Серік Шапкенов
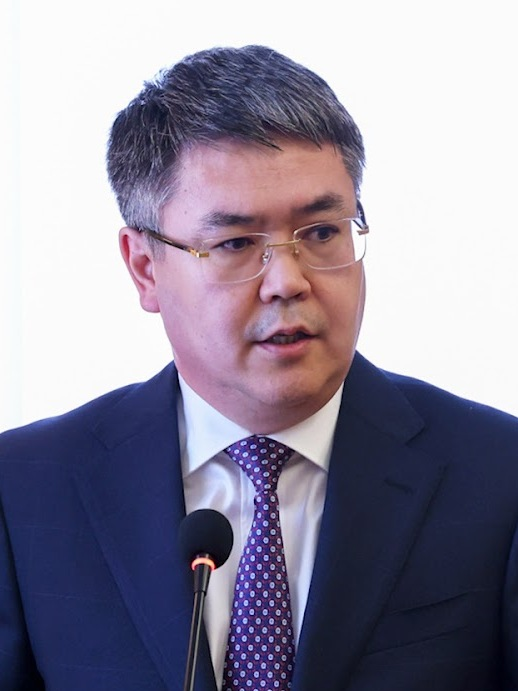
- Shapkenov in 2022

Äkim of Atyrau Region
- In office 7 April 2022 – 17 July 2026
- President: Kassym-Jomart Tokayev
- Preceded by: Mahambet Dosmuhambetov
- Succeeded by: Bolat Aqşolaqov

Minister of Labour and Social Protection of the Population
- In office 18 January 2021 – 7 April 2022
- President: Kassym-Jomart Tokayev
- Prime Minister: Askar Mamin; Älihan Smaiylov
- Preceded by: Birjan Nurymbetov
- Succeeded by: Tamara Duisenova

Äkim of Atyrau
- In office 14 July 2016 – 28 June 2018
- Preceded by: Nurlybek Ojaev
- Succeeded by: Älimuhammed Quttymuratuly

Personal details
- Born: 29 July 1979 (age 47) Karatobe, West Kazakhstan Region, Kazakh SSR, Soviet Union
- Party: Nur Otan (2005–present)
- Spouse: Jadyra Şapkenova
- Children: 2
- Education: West Kazakhstan State University

Serık Jambylūly Şapkenov (Note: Often transliterated as Serik Zhambulovich Shapkenov through a Russified Romanization of Серик Жамбулович Шапкенов.) (Kazakh: Серік Жамбылұлы Шапкенов; born 29 July 1979) is a Kazakh politician, who's served as äkim of Atyrau Region from 2022 to 2026.

== Biography ==
=== Early life and education ===
Şapkenov was born in the village of Karatobe. In 2000, he graduated from West Kazakhstan State University as an economist and mathematician and was lecturer there until 2001.

=== Career ===
From 2001, Şapkenov worked as a leading specialist of the Environmental Protection Fund and Directorate of Nature Management of the Äkimat of West Kazakhstan Region. In 2002, he became a leading and chief specialist of the Finance Department until being appointed as the head of the Department of Economics and Budget Planning, head of the Department, deputy director of the Department of Agriculture of the West Kazakhstan Region in 2006. From 2007, Şapkenov was the deputy head of the Department of Economics and Budget Planning before becoming the head again in 2009.

In January 2012, Şapkenov was appointed as the deputy äkim of West Kazakhstan Region. He served the post before becoming the first deputy äkim on 27 August 2012. From January 2015, he worked as State Inspector of the Department of State Control and Organizational and Territorial Work of the Administration of the President of the Republic of Kazakhstan until 14 July 2016, when he was appointed as the äkim of Atyrau. On 28 June 2018, Şapkenov became the first deputy äkim of Atyrau Region. He was eventually dismissed on 22 May 2020 and was subsequently appointed as Vice Minister of Labour and Social Protection of the Population on 4 June 2020.

From 2021 to 2022, he was Labour and Social Protection of the Population Minister.

On April 7, 2022, with approval Atyrau Regional Mäslihat by president Tokayev's decree Serik Şapkenov was appointed akim of Atyrau Region. On July 17, 2026 Şapkenov was relieved of that post.
