= Birlik, Atyrau Region =

Utery
- Village
- Interactive map of Utery
- Coordinates: 46°29′20″N 48°59′40″E
- Country: Kazakhstan
- Region: Atyrau Region
- Time zone: UTC+5 (Central Asia Time)

Birlik (Kazakh: Бірлік, Bırlık), before 2007 Utery, is a village in the Atyrau Region of western Kazakhstan.
