= Arshinov =

- Village
- Interactive map of Arshinov
- Coordinates: 46°35′0″N 48°52′0″E
- Country: Kazakhstan
- Region: Atyrau Region
- Time zone: UTC+5 (Central Asia Time)

Arshinov is a village in the Atyrau Region of western Kazakhstan.
