= Eastern European Summer Time =

Daylight saving time zone used in Eastern Europe (UTC+3)

- Time zone

UTC offset
- EEST: UTC+03:00

Current time
- 09:57, 20 April 2026 EET [refresh] 10:57, 20 April 2026 EEST [refresh]

Observance of DST
- This time zone is only used for DST. For the rest of the year, EET is used.

Time in Europe: Light Blue / Western European Time / Greenwich Mean Time (UTC); Blue / Western European Time / Greenwich Mean Time (UTC); Blue / Western European Summer Time / British Summer Time / Irish Standard Time (UTC+1); Red / Central European Time (UTC+1); Red / Central European Summer Time (UTC+2); Yellow / Eastern European Time / Kaliningrad Time (UTC+2); Ochre / Eastern European Time (UTC+2); Ochre / Eastern European Summer Time (UTC+3); Green / Moscow Time / Turkey Time (UTC+3); Turquoise / Armenia Time / Azerbaijan Time / Georgia Time / Samara Time (UTC+4); Pink / Kazakhstan Time / Yekaterinburg Time (UTC+5); ▉▉▉▉ Pale hues: Standard time observed all year ▉▉▉ Dark hues: Daylight saving time

Eastern European Summer Time (EEST) is one of the names of the UTC+03:00 time zone, which is 3 hours ahead of Coordinated Universal Time. It is used as a summer daylight saving time in some European and Middle Eastern countries, which makes it the same as Arabia Standard Time, East Africa Time, and Moscow Time. During the winter periods, Eastern European Time (UTC+02:00) is used.

Since 1996, European Summer Time has been applied from the last Sunday in March to the last Sunday in October. Previously, the rules were not uniform across the European Union.

== Usage ==
The following countries and territories use Eastern European Summer Time during the summer:

- Belarus, Moscow Summer Time in years 1981–89, regular EEST from 1991-2011
- Bulgaria, regular EEST since 1979
- Cyprus, regular EEST since 1979 (Northern Cyprus stopped using EEST in September 2016, but returned to EEST in March 2018)
- Egypt, in the years 1988–2010, 2014–2015 and since 2023 (see also Egypt Standard Time)
- Estonia, Moscow Summer Time in years 1981–88, regular EEST since 1989
- Finland, regular EEST since 1981
- Greece, regular EEST since 1975
- Israel, Israel Daylight Time since 1948 (which tracks EEST when the two overlap)
- Jordan, since 1985 (permanent DST since 2022)
- Latvia, Moscow Summer Time in years 1981–88, regular EEST since 1989
- Lebanon, since 1984
- Lithuania, Moscow Summer Time in years 1981–88, regular EEST since 1989, apart from in years 1998-2003 when it was Central European Summer Time
- Moldova, Moscow Summer Time in years 1932–40 and 1981–89, regular EEST since 1991
- Romania, unofficial EEST in years 1932–40, regular EEST since 1979
- Russia (Kaliningrad), Moscow Summer Time in years 1981–90, regular EEST since 1991, as standard time in 2011-2014.
- Syria, since 1983 (permanent DST since 2022)
- Ukraine, Moscow Summer Time in years 1981–89, regular EEST from 1992 to 2024.

In 1991, EEST was used also in Moscow and Samara time zones of Russia. Egypt has previously used EEST in 1957–2010 and 2014–2015. Turkey, has previously used EEST in 1970–1978, EEST and Moscow Summer Time in 1979–1983, and EEST in 1985–2016.

Colour	Legal time vs. local mean time
	1 h ± 30 m behind
	0 h ± 30 m
	1 h ± 30 m ahead
	2 h ± 30 m ahead
	3 h ± 30 m ahead

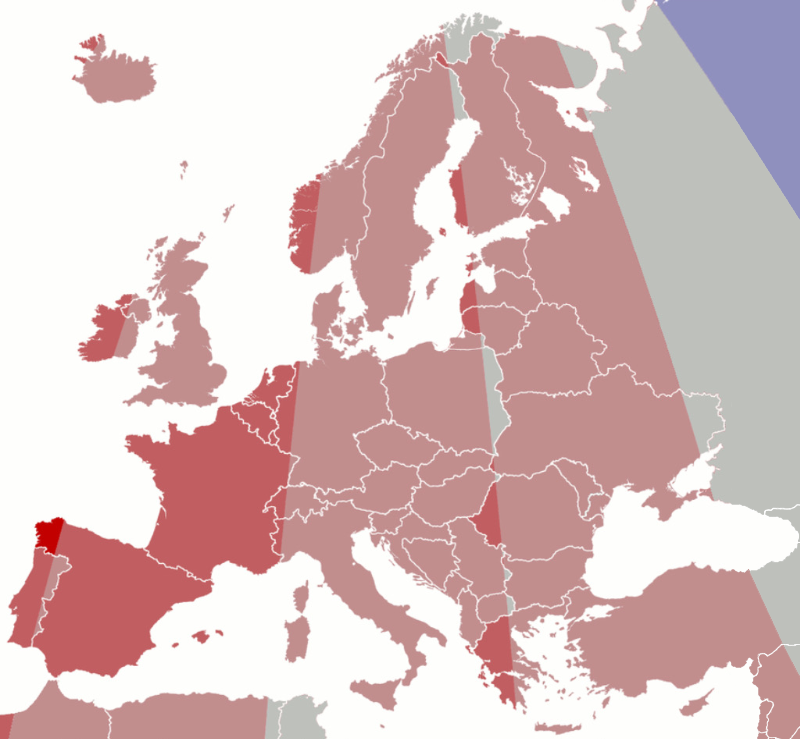
European summer

== See also ==
- European Summer Time
- UTC+03:00
