= Karabau =

- Village
- Interactive map of Karabau
- Coordinates: 48°27′0″N 52°56′0″E
- Country: Kazakhstan
- Region: Atyrau Region
- Time zone: UTC+5 (Central Asia Time)

Karabau (Kazakh: Қарабау, Qarabau) is a village in the Atyrau Region of western Kazakhstan.

== Climate ==
Climate data for Karabau (1991–2020)
Month	Jan	Feb	Mar	Apr	May	Jun	Jul	Aug	Sep	Oct	Nov	Dec	Year
Mean daily maximum °C (°F)	−4.7 (23.5)	−3.3 (26.1)	5.3 (41.5)	17.6 (63.7)	25.7 (78.3)	31.5 (88.7)	33.7 (92.7)	32.3 (90.1)	24.7 (76.5)	15.4 (59.7)	4.2 (39.6)	−2.8 (27.0)	15 (59)
Daily mean °C (°F)	−8.8 (16.2)	−8.1 (17.4)	0.0 (32.0)	10.7 (51.3)	18.4 (65.1)	24.2 (75.6)	26.5 (79.7)	24.6 (76.3)	17.1 (62.8)	8.6 (47.5)	−0.3 (31.5)	−6.5 (20.3)	8.9 (48.0)
Mean daily minimum °C (°F)	−12.3 (9.9)	−12.2 (10.0)	−4.4 (24.1)	4.5 (40.1)	11.2 (52.2)	16.4 (61.5)	18.7 (65.7)	16.7 (62.1)	10.0 (50.0)	3.1 (37.6)	−3.9 (25.0)	−9.8 (14.4)	3.2 (37.8)
Average precipitation mm (inches)	14.7 (0.58)	12.3 (0.48)	17.6 (0.69)	21.3 (0.84)	26.9 (1.06)	21.5 (0.85)	13.9 (0.55)	10.4 (0.41)	10.8 (0.43)	19.0 (0.75)	18.0 (0.71)	17.4 (0.69)	203.8 (8.02)
Average precipitation days (≥ 1.0 mm)	4.5	3.7	3.9	4.2	4.7	3.0	2.8	1.9	2.5	3.9	4.1	5.0	44.2
Source: NOAA
