= Koshkar =

- Village
- Location in Kazakhstan
- Coordinates: 47°26′N 53°27′E
- Country: Kazakhstan
- Region: Atyrau Region
- Time zone: UTC+5 (Central Asia Time)

Koshkar (Kazakh: Қошқар, Qoşqar) is a village in the Atyrau Region of western Kazakhstan.
