= Al'manbyuruk =

- Village
- Interactive map of Al'manbyuruk
- Coordinates: 46°35′0″N 48°43′0″E
- Country: Kazakhstan
- Region: Atyrau Region
- Time zone: UTC+5 (Central Asia Time)

Al'manbyuruk is a village in the Atyrau Region of western Kazakhstan.
