= Makat District =

Coordinates: 47.644°N 53.343°E

Makat
- District
- Мақат ауданы
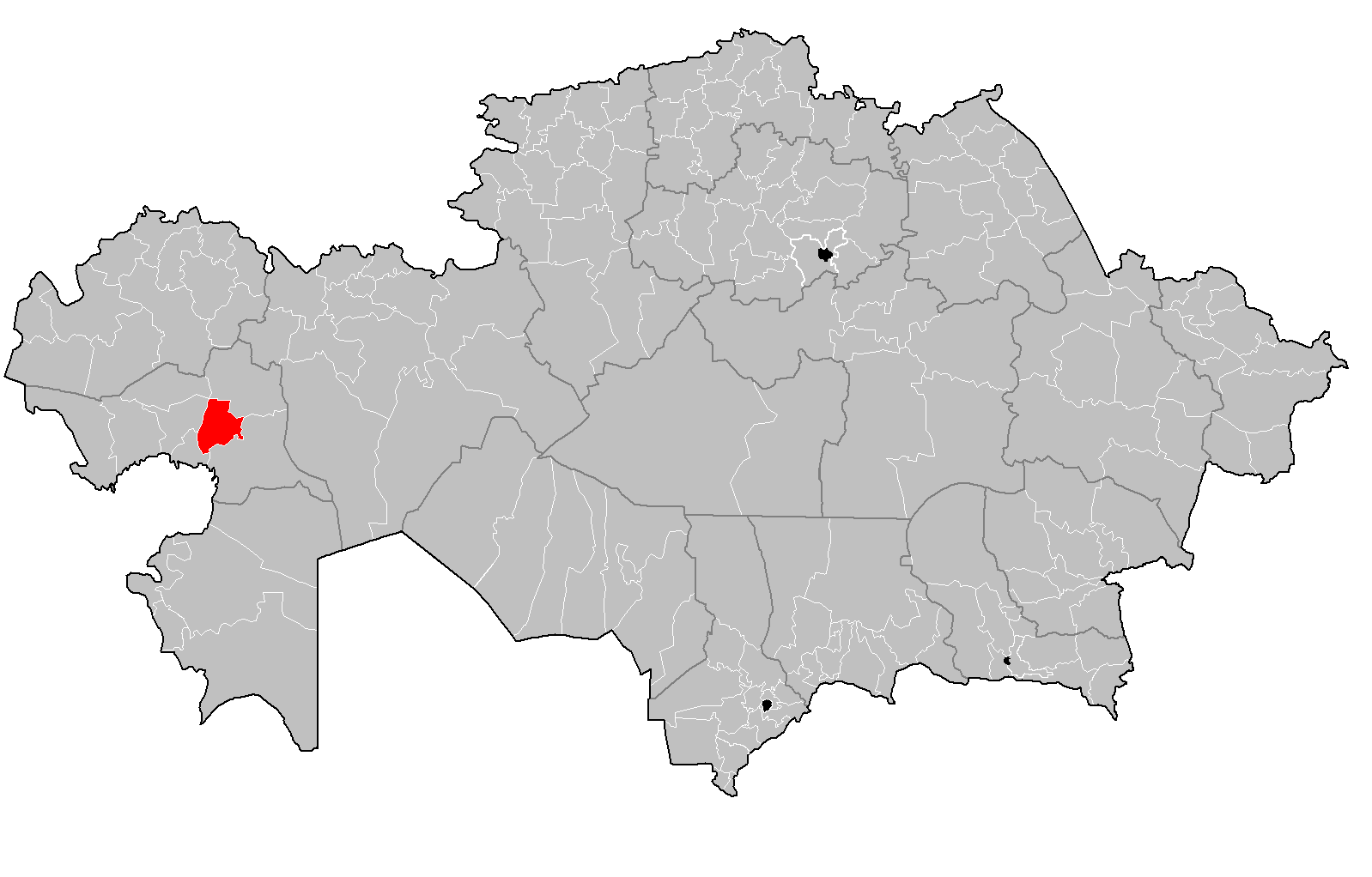
- Country: Kazakhstan
- Region: Atyrau Region
- Administrative center: Makat

Government
  - Akim: Azamat Mambetov

Area
  - Total: 1,900 sq mi (4,900 km^{2})

Population (2013)
  - Total: 29,744
- Time zone: UTC+5 (West)

Makat District (Kazakh: Мақат ауданы, Maqat audany) is a district of Atyrau Region in Kazakhstan. The administrative center of the district is the urban-type settlement of Makat. Population: 29,744 (2013 estimate); 29,269 (2009 census results); 25,193 (1999 census results).
