= Kurmangazy, Atyrau Region =

Kurmangazy Құрманғазы Qūrmanğazy
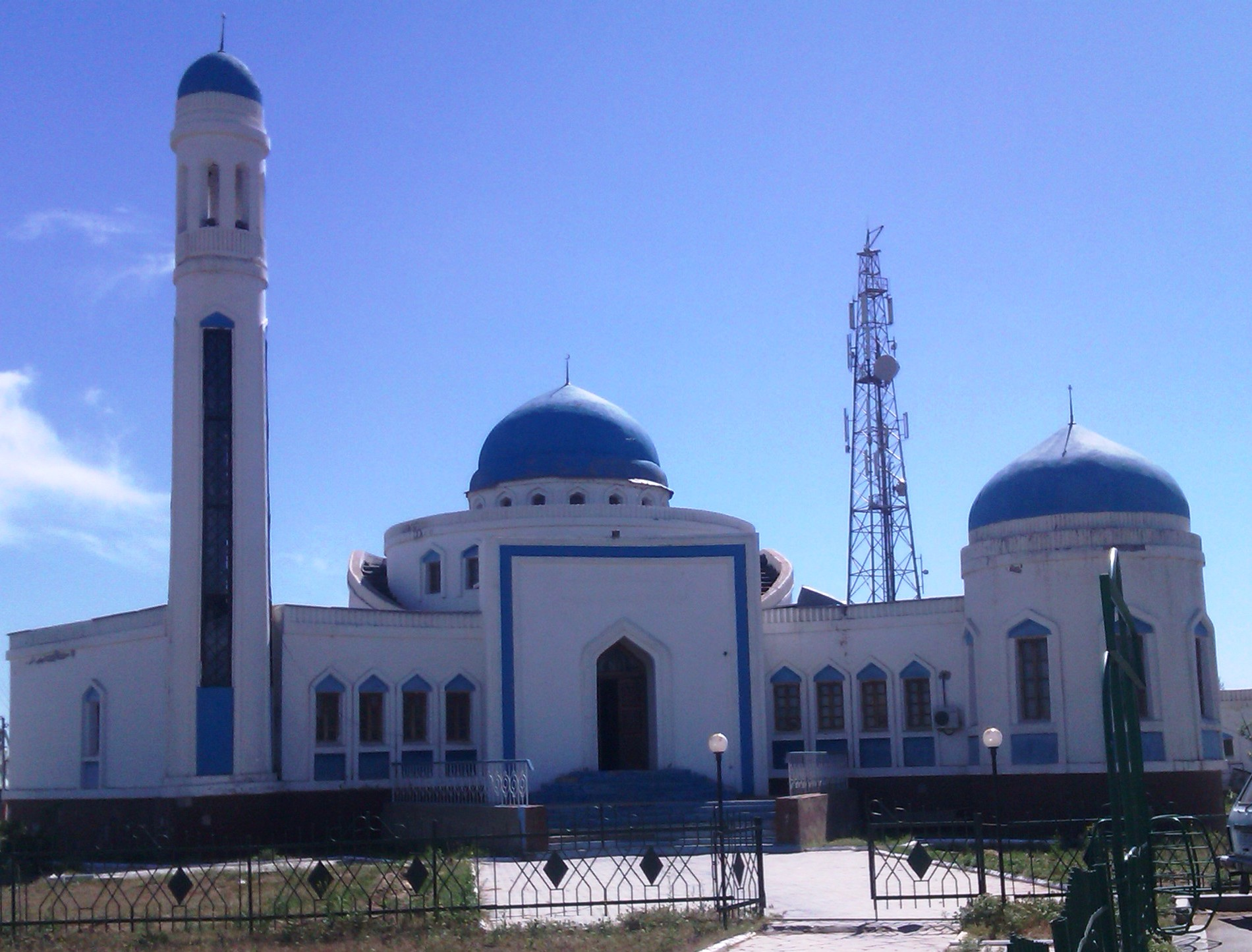
- Mosque in Kurmangazy

- Location in Kazakhstan
- Coordinates: 46°36′00″N 49°16′00″E
- Country: Kazakhstan
- Region: Atyrau Region
- Elevation: −23 m (−75 ft)

Population
  - Total: 13 400
  - Summer (DST): +5

Kurmangazy (Kazakh: Құрманғазы, romanized: Qūrmanğazy pronounced [qʊrmɑ́nɢɑzə́]), known before 2018 as Ganyushkin (Kazakh: Ганюшкин, romanized: Ganiuşkin; Russian: Ганюшкино), is the administrative center of the Kurmangazy District, Atyrau Region, Kazakhstan. Kurmangazy is situated at 46°38'N, 49°08'E with an elevation of −23 m (−75 ft). Kurmangazy is in the west of Atyrau and close to the north shore of the Caspian Sea and the Kazakhstan–Russia border. It is in the area west of the Ural River and thus in the European part of Kazakhstan. Population: 12,750 (2009 census results); 12,419 (1999 census results). It was named after Kazakh composer Qūrmanğazy Sağyrbaev.

== Climate ==
Kurmangazy has a cold desert climate (Köppen climate classification BWk) with cold winters and warm summers.

Climate data for Kurmangazy (1991–2020)
Month	Jan	Feb	Mar	Apr	May	Jun	Jul	Aug	Sep	Oct	Nov	Dec	Year
Mean daily maximum °C (°F)	−1.5 (29.3)	0.0 (32.0)	7.4 (45.3)	17.1 (62.8)	24.7 (76.5)	30.0 (86.0)	32.5 (90.5)	31.4 (88.5)	24.3 (75.7)	16.1 (61.0)	6.4 (43.5)	0.2 (32.4)	15.7 (60.3)
Daily mean °C (°F)	−5.0 (23.0)	−4.4 (24.1)	2.4 (36.3)	11.0 (51.8)	18.7 (65.7)	24.0 (75.2)	26.0 (78.8)	24.3 (75.7)	17.5 (63.5)	10.0 (50.0)	2.0 (35.6)	−3.0 (26.6)	10.3 (50.5)
Mean daily minimum °C (°F)	−7.9 (17.8)	−7.8 (18.0)	−1.5 (29.3)	5.7 (42.3)	13.3 (55.9)	18.4 (65.1)	19.8 (67.6)	17.6 (63.7)	11.5 (52.7)	5.2 (41.4)	−1.4 (29.5)	−5.8 (21.6)	5.6 (42.1)
Average precipitation mm (inches)	9.1 (0.36)	6.3 (0.25)	11.6 (0.46)	16.2 (0.64)	18.2 (0.72)	16.4 (0.65)	14.1 (0.56)	11.7 (0.46)	13.8 (0.54)	12.9 (0.51)	10.4 (0.41)	9.0 (0.35)	149.8 (5.90)
Average precipitation days (≥ 1.0 mm)	3.1	1.8	2.8	2.9	3.2	2.8	2.1	1.8	2.3	2.7	2.4	2.5	30.4
Source: NOAA
