= Akkystau =

Akkystau Аққыстау اككىستاۋ
- Location within Kazakhstan
- Coordinates: 47°13′25″N 51°00′22″E
- Country: Kazakhstan
- Region: Atyrau
- Founded: 1973
- Elevation: −8 m (−26 ft)

Population (2019)
  - Total: 8,486
- Time zone: UTC+5 (West Kazakhstan Time)
  - Summer (DST): UTC+5 (West Kazakhstan Time)
- Postal index: 060300

Akkystau, also known as Aqqystau, (Kazakh: Аққыстау, Aqqystau, اككىستاۋ) is a town in Atyrau Region, southwest Kazakhstan. It lies at an altitude of 8 m (26 ft) below sea level.
