= Miyaly =

Miyaly Миялы ميالى
- Town
- Location in Kazakhstan
- Coordinates: 48°53′06″N 53°47′31″E
- Country: Kazakhstan
- Region: Atyrau
- District: Kyzylkoga District
- Elevation: 29 m (95 ft)

Population
  - Total: 6,213
- Time zone: UTC+05:00 (Kazakhstan Time)

Miyaly (Kazakh: Миялы, Miialy, ميالى; Russian: Миялы, Miyaly) is a town in Kyzylkoga District, Atyrau Region, west Kazakhstan. It is the center of the Myaly Rural District. It lies at an altitude of 29 m (95 ft). It has a population of 6,213.
