= List of Äkims of Atyrau Region =

This is the list of äkıms of Atyrau Region that have held the position since 1992.

== List of Äkıms ==
- Sağat Tügelbaev (7 February 1992 – 14 October 1994)
- Ravil Şyrdabaev (16 October 1994 – 18 February 1999)
- İmanğali Tasmağambetov (18 February 1999 – 16 December 2000)
- Serıkbek Däukeev (18 December 2000 – 3 April 2002)
- Aslan Musin (3 April 2002 – 4 October 2006)
- Bergei Rysqaliev (4 October 2006 – 15 August 2012)
- Baqtyqoja Izmūhambetov (15 August 2012 – 24 March 2016)
- Nūrlan Noğaev (26 March 2016 – 18 December 2019)
- Mahamet Dosmūhambetov (18 December 2019 – 7 April 2022)
- Serik Şapkenov (7 April 2022 – 17 July 2026)
- Bolat Aqşolaqov (since 17 July 2026)
