= Makhambet =

Makhambet Махамбет
- Location within Kazakhstan
- Coordinates: 47°40′00″N 51°35′00″E
- Country: Kazakhstan
- Region: Atyrau
- Elevation: −8 m (−26 ft)

Population
  - Total: 8,905
- Time zone: UTC+5 (West Kazakhstan Time)
  - Summer (DST): UTC+5 (West Kazakhstan Time)

Makhambet (Kazakh: Махамбет, romanized: Mahambet, pronounced [mɑχɑmbʲét]; Russian: Махамбет) is a town in Atyrau Region, Kazakhstan. It lies at an altitude of 8 m (26 ft) below sea level. It has a population of 8,905.

== Climate ==
Makhambet has a steppe climate (Köppen: BSk), with hot summers and cold winters.

Climate data for Makhambet (1991–2020)
Month	Jan	Feb	Mar	Apr	May	Jun	Jul	Aug	Sep	Oct	Nov	Dec	Year
Mean daily maximum °C (°F)	−3.7 (25.3)	−2.0 (28.4)	6.7 (44.1)	17.8 (64.0)	25.8 (78.4)	31.7 (89.1)	34.0 (93.2)	32.5 (90.5)	24.9 (76.8)	15.9 (60.6)	5.0 (41.0)	−1.7 (28.9)	15.6 (60.1)
Daily mean °C (°F)	−7.5 (18.5)	−6.7 (19.9)	1.2 (34.2)	11.0 (51.8)	18.7 (65.7)	24.5 (76.1)	26.9 (80.4)	24.9 (76.8)	17.6 (63.7)	9.2 (48.6)	0.5 (32.9)	−5.2 (22.6)	9.6 (49.3)
Mean daily minimum °C (°F)	−10.7 (12.7)	−10.6 (12.9)	−3.2 (26.2)	5.0 (41.0)	11.9 (53.4)	17.2 (63.0)	19.5 (67.1)	17.4 (63.3)	10.8 (51.4)	3.8 (38.8)	−3.0 (26.6)	−8.2 (17.2)	4.2 (39.6)
Average precipitation mm (inches)	13.4 (0.53)	10.4 (0.41)	14.5 (0.57)	17.2 (0.68)	24.9 (0.98)	28.2 (1.11)	15.7 (0.62)	11.6 (0.46)	13.0 (0.51)	19.1 (0.75)	16.1 (0.63)	15.1 (0.59)	199.2 (7.84)
Average precipitation days (≥ 1.0 mm)	3.7	2.9	3.6	3.6	4.1	3.6	2.5	2.0	2.4	3.5	3.4	4.3	39.6
Source: NOAA
