= Isatay District =

Coordinates: 47°13′18″N 51°00′23″E

Isatay
- District
- Исатай ауданы
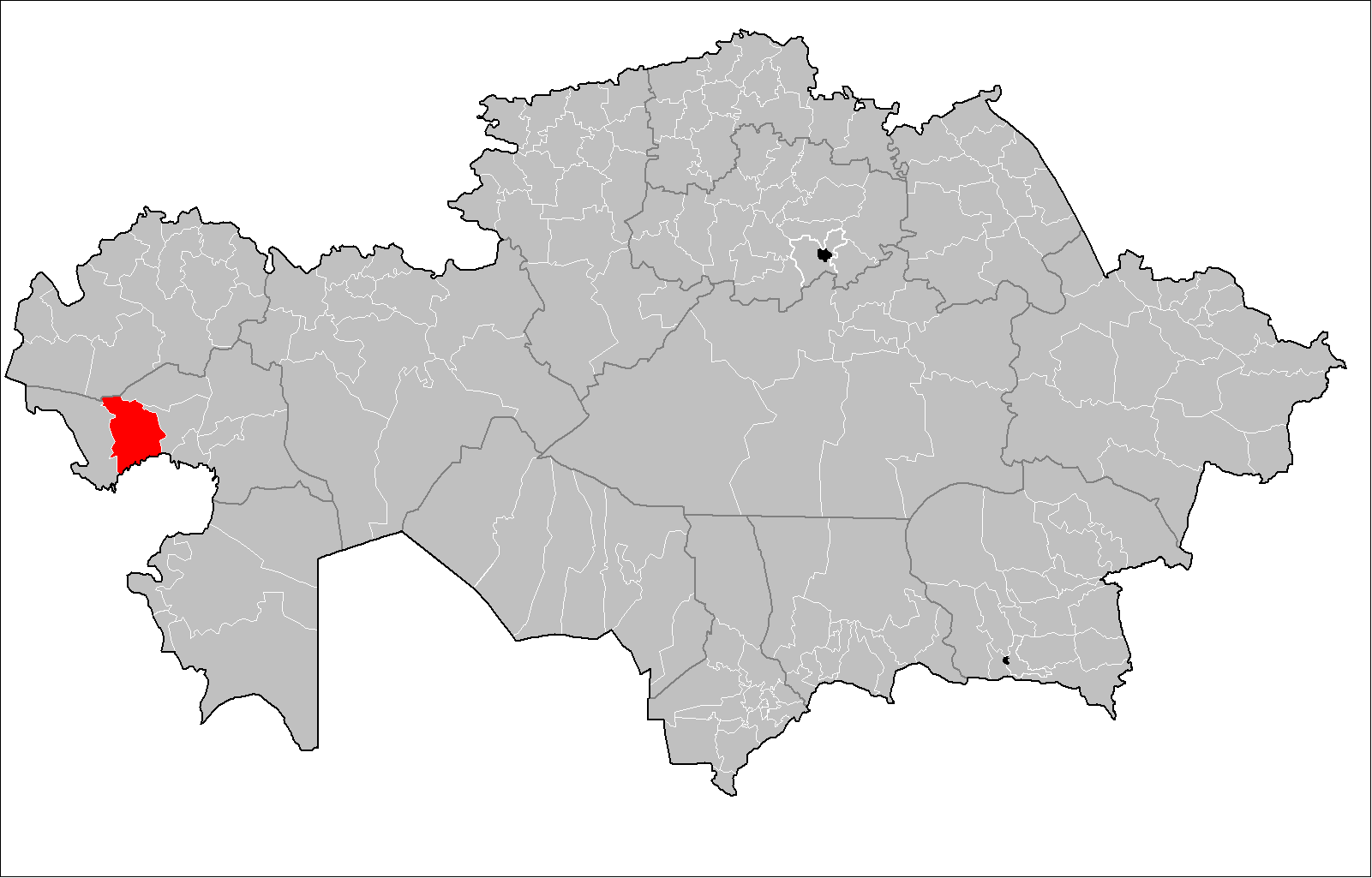
- Country: Kazakhstan
- Region: Atyrau Region
- Administrative center: Akkystau

Government
  - Akim (mayor): Nurym Musin

Area
  - Total: 5,700 sq mi (14,700 km^{2})

Population (2013)
  - Total: 25,895
- Time zone: UTC+5 (West)

Isatay District (Kazakh: Исатай ауданы, Isatai audany) is a district of Atyrau Region in Kazakhstan. Named in honor of Isatay Taymanuly, a revered 19th-century Kazakh national hero and batyr (warrior) who led an anti-colonial rebellion alongside Makhambet Uteisuly. The administrative center of the district is the selo of Akkystau.

The population is 25,895 (2013 estimate), up from 24,643 (2009 census results) and 21,711 (1999 census results).
