= Makat =

Makat Мақат Макат
- Location within Kazakhstan
- Coordinates: 47°39′00″N 53°19′00″E
- Country: Kazakhstan
- Region: Atyrau
- Elevation: −22 m (−72 ft)

Population
  - Total: 14,082
- Time zone: UTC+5 (West Kazakhstan Time)
  - Summer (DST): UTC+5 (West Kazakhstan Time)

Makat (Kazakh: Мақат, romanized: Maqat, pronounced [mɑq(χ)ɑ́t]; Russian: Макат) is a town in Atyrau Region, Kazakhstan. It lies at an altitude of 22 m (72 ft) below sea level. It has a population of 14,082.
