= Kurmangazy District =

Coordinates: 47°26′24″N 48°58′48″E

Kurmangazy
- District
- Құрманғазы ауданы
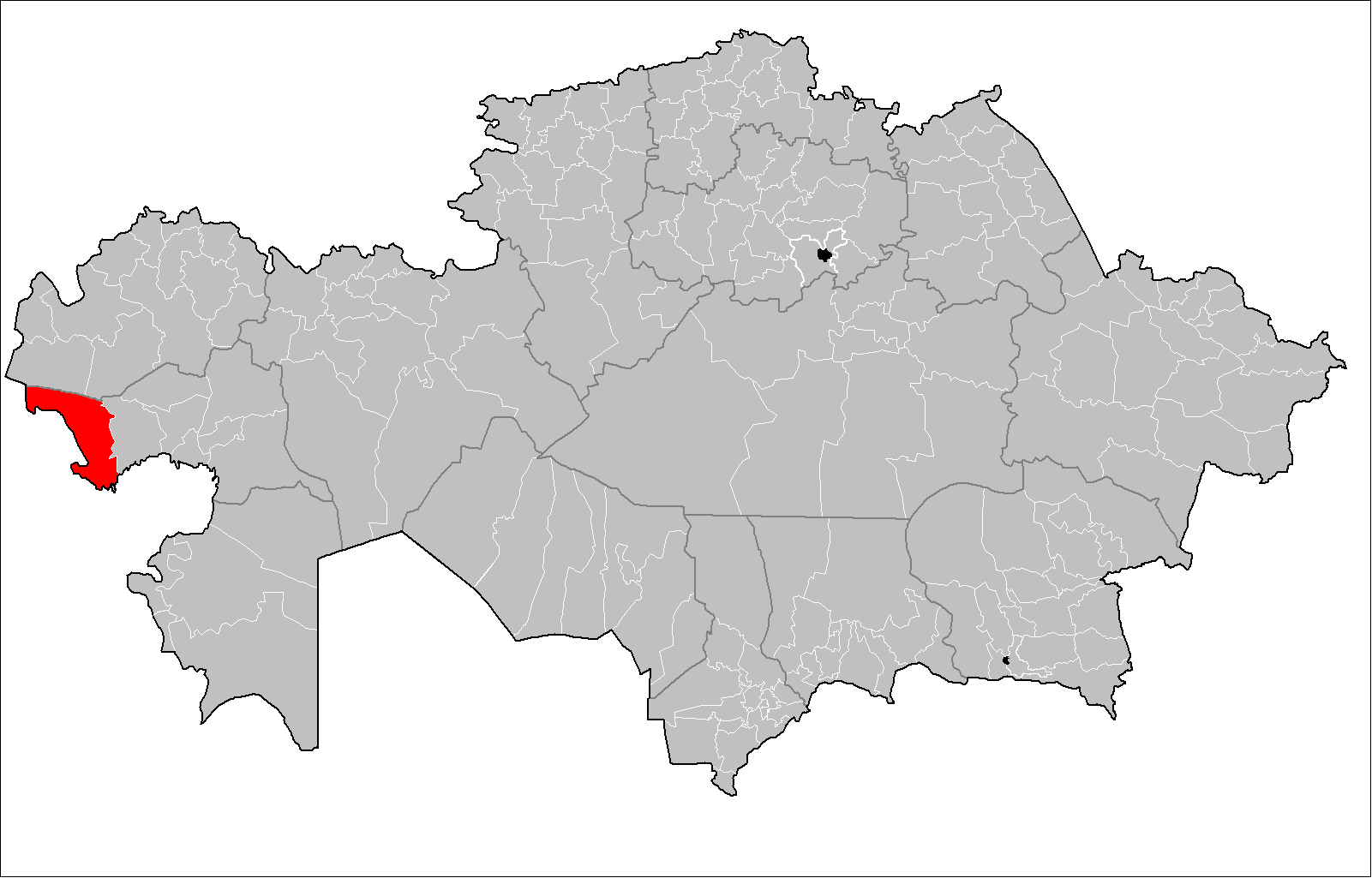
- Country: Kazakhstan
- Region: Atyrau Region
- Administrative center: Ganyushkino

Government
  - Akim: Murziev Marat Bisengalievich

Area
  - Total: 8,000 sq mi (20,800 km^{2})

Population (2013)
  - Total: 57,138
- Time zone: UTC+5 (West)

Kurmangazy District (Kazakh: Құрманғазы ауданы, Qūrmanğazy audany, قۇرمانعازى اۋدانى) is a district of Atyrau Region in Kazakhstan. The administrative center of the district is the selo of Kurmangazy. Population: 57,138 (2013 estimate); 55,502 (2009 census results); 55,579 (1999 census results).

== History ==
Bukeevskaya province (Kazakh: Бөкей губерниясы) is an administrative-territorial unit within the Russian Republic and the RSFSR. The center is the city of Urda (until 1918 - the village of Khanskaya Headquarters; in 1918-1920 - the Kirghiz steppe).

The province was formed on July 1, 1917 on the territory of the Bukey Horde, which until then had been de facto administratively subordinate to the Astrakhan province (de jure administered through the Ministry of Foreign Affairs). By 1919, it was divided into Kalmyk, Kamysh-Samar, Naryn, I Primorsky, II Primorsky, Talovsky and Torgunsky districts, as well as the region of the Volga-Caspian Kyrgyzstan.

In 1920, when the Kirghiz Autonomous Soviet Socialist Republic was formed, the Bukeev province became part of it.

In 1921, the region of the Volga-Caspian Kirghizia was abolished, and its territory became part of the 2nd Primorsky district.

In 1922, Dengiz, Dzhangalinsky, and Urdinsky uyezds were formed. Kalmyk, Kamysh-Samar, Naryn, Torgun, 1st and 2nd Primorsky counties were abolished.

June 6, 1925 Bukeevskaya province was included in the Ural province of the Kazakh ASSR.

The district was formed in 1928 under the name of Dengiz district. On September 9, 1993, it was renamed Kurmangazinsky district in honor of Kurmangazy Sagyrbayuly.
