= Atyrau Regional Mäslihat =

Unicameral local legislature of Kazakhstan

Atyrau Regional Mäslihat: Атырау облыстық мәслихаты (Kazakh); Атырауский областной маслихат (Russian)

Type
- Type: Unicameral

History
- Founded: 10 December 1993

Leadership
- Secretary: Älibek Näutiev, Nur Otan since 15 January 2021

Structure
- Seats: 31
- Political groups: Majority (25); Nur Otan (25); Opposition (6); Ak Zhol (3); Auyl (3)
- Length of term: 5 years

Elections
- Voting system: Party-list proportional representation Largest remainder method
- Last election: 10 January 2021
- Next election: 2026

The Atyrau Regional Mäslihat (Kazakh: Атырау облыстық мәслихаты, romanized: Atyrau oblystyq mäslihaty, Russian: Атырауский областной маслихат, romanized: Atyrausky oblastnoy maslikhat) is a local unicameral legislature of the Atyrau Region where it convenes in Atyrau. Founded in 1993, it currently consists of 32 members of three parties in which the Nur Otan (NO) has a supermajority of and is currently led by Secretary Älibek Näutiev (NO). The Regional Mäslihat functions as a branch in passing measures based on Kazakh laws in the region.

== History ==
The Atyrau Regional Mäslihat was established on basis of the Law 2578-XII "On local representative and executive bodies of the Republic of Kazakhstan" from 10 December 1993. Local elections, including for the Regional Mäslihat were set for 7 March 1994. Members of the Mäslihat were elected for a five-year term from their constituencies using secret ballot and were non-partisan. The electoral practice continued to be in place until 2018, when the Parliament of Kazakhstan enacted a new law which allowed for political parties to form parliamentary groups within the local legislatures.

For the first time in 2021, 31 members of the Regional Mäslihat were elected on basis of party-list proportional representation. From there, the Nur Otan took an overwhelming majority of 25 seats, following by Ak Zhol Democratic Party (AJ) and Auyl People's Democratic Patriotic Party (AUYL) whom each won three seats.

== Elections ==
Mäslihat members are generally up for re-election every 5 years and are elected on the basis of party-list proportional representation with a required 7% electoral threshold to win any seats in the legislature. If only one parties manages to bypass the electoral threshold, then the party win the second highest number of votes is granted enough seats for representation in the mäslihat regardless whether it had passed the threshold or not. A member of the mäslihat may be a citizen of Kazakhstan who has reached 20 years of age and can be a member of only one mäslihat.

== Powers and functions ==
In accordance with the Article 20 of the Constitution of Kazakhstan "On local government and self-government in the Republic of Kazakhstan"

- A member of a mäslihat expresses the will of the population of the corresponding administrative-territorial units, taking into account national interests.
- The powers of a member of a mäslihat begin from the moment of his registration as a deputy of a mäslihat by the relevant territorial election commission and terminate from the moment of termination of the powers of a mäslihat.
- The powers of a member of a mäslihat shall be terminated ahead of schedule in the following cases:
1. Election or appointment of a deputy to a position, the occupation of which, in accordance with the legislation of the Republic of Kazakhstan, is incompatible with the performance of deputy duties;
2. entry into legal force of a court decision on the recognition of a member incapacitated or partially incapacitated;
3. Termination of powers of mäslihat;
4. Death of a member by entry into force of a court declaration;
5. Termination of his citizenship of the Republic of Kazakhstan;
6. Entry into legal force of the court's conviction against the member;
7. Leaving for permanent residence outside the relevant administrative-territorial unit;
8. In connection with the personal resignation of the member;
9. Systematic failure of a member to fulfill his duties, including absence without good reason at plenary sessions of the mäslihat session or meetings of the mäslihat bodies to which he was elected, more than three times in a row;
- The decision on the early termination of the powers of a deputy is made at a session of the mäslihat by a majority of votes from the total number of present deputies upon the presentation of the relevant territorial election commission.
- Members of mäslihats who carry out their activities on a permanent or vacant basis, paid from the state budget, are not entitled to carry out entrepreneurial activities, independently participate in the management of an economic entity, engage in other paid activities, except for pedagogical, scientific or other creative.

== Current composition ==
The last election for the Atyrau Regional Mäslihat was held on 10 January 2021.

Party	Seats
Nur Otan (NO)	25 / 31
Ak Zhol Democratic Party (AJ)	3 / 31
Auyl People's Democratic Patriotic Party (AUYL)	3 / 31

== See also ==
- Mäslihat
- 2021 Atyrau regional election
