= Makhambet District =

Coordinates: 47°40′N 51°35′E

Makhambet
- District
- Махамбет ауданы
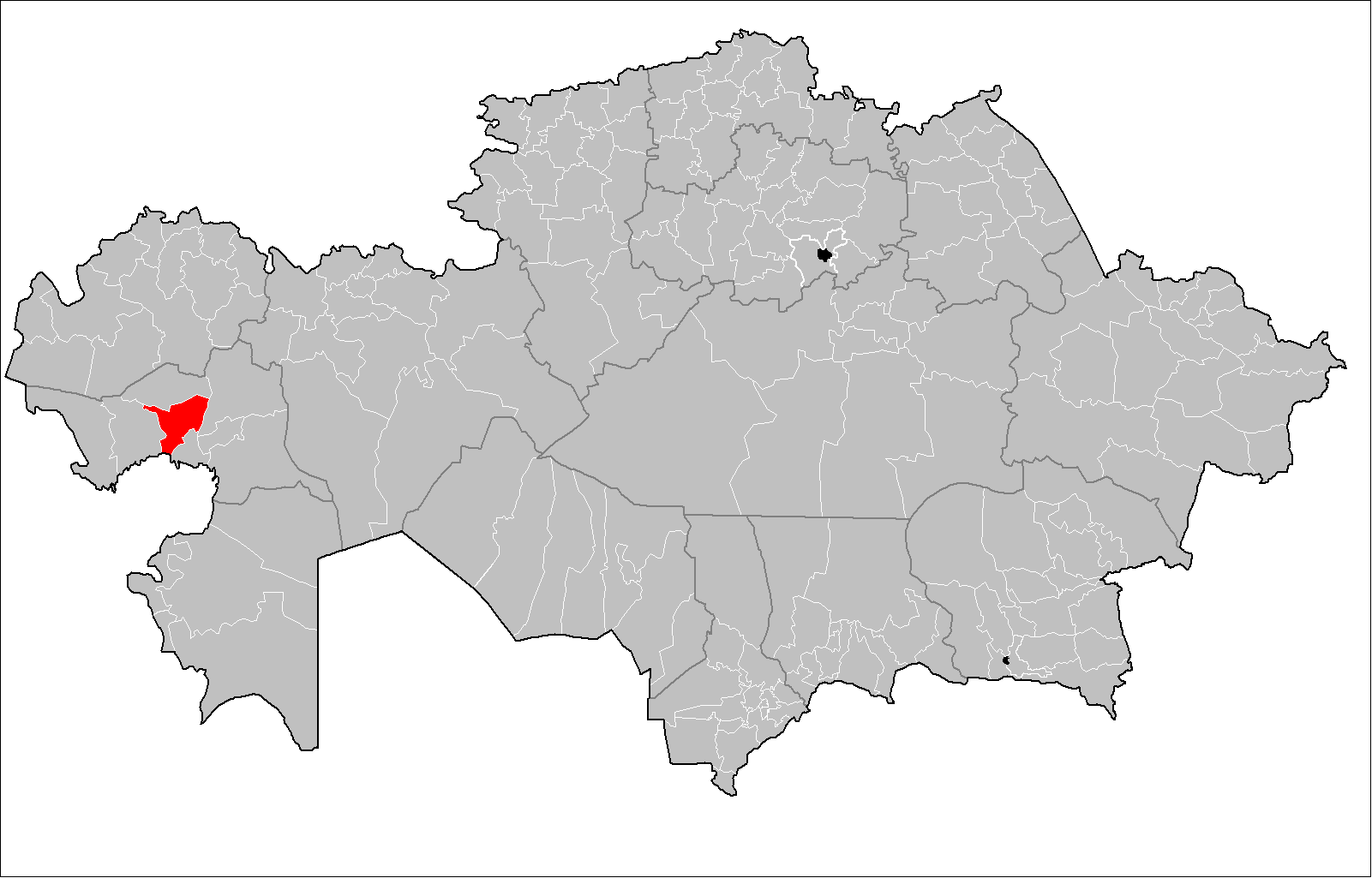
- Country: Kazakhstan
- Region: Atyrau Region
- Administrative center: Makhambet

Government
  - Akim: Kairat Nurlybaev

Area
  - Total: 3,700 sq mi (9,600 km^{2})

Population (2013)
  - Total: 32,104
- Time zone: UTC+5

Makhambet District (Kazakh: Махамбет ауданы, romanized: Mahambet audany) is a district of Atyrau Region in Kazakhstan. Named after Makhambet Otemisuly, a famous 19th-century Kazakh poet, composer, and co-leader of the national liberation uprising with Isatay Taimanuly. The administrative center of the district is Makhambet. Population: 32,104 (2013 estimate); 29,167 (2009 census results); 26,559 (1999 census results).

== Geography ==
Makhambet District is located in the central part of the Caspian Depression. The Ural river flows across it. Lake Zhaltyr is located in the district.
