= Kyzylkoga District =

Coordinates: 48°16′48″N 53°51′00″E

Kyzylkoga
- District
- Қызылқоға ауданы
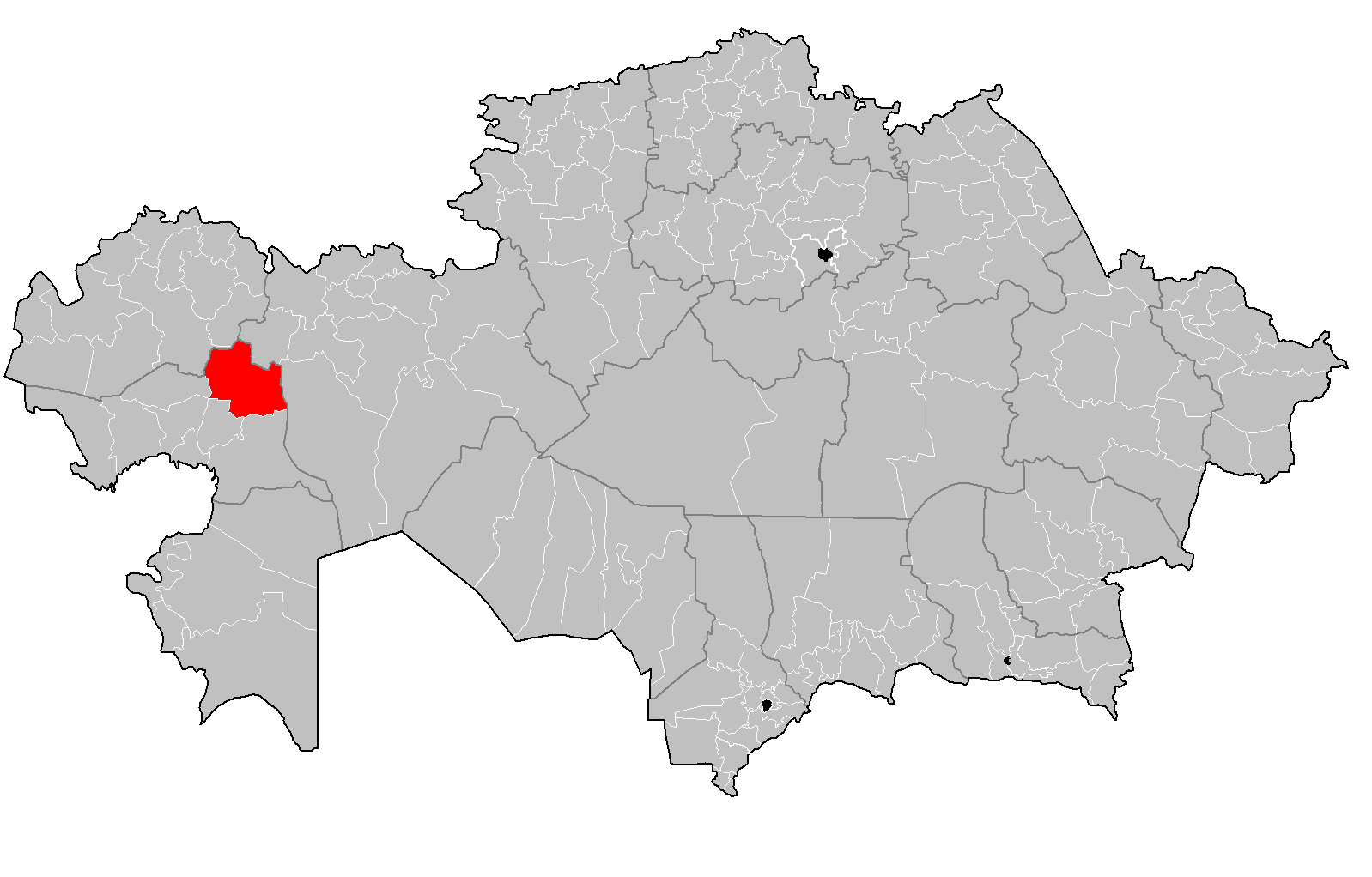
- Country: Kazakhstan
- Region: Atyrau Region
- Administrative center: Miyaly

Government
  - Akim: Bisembiev Nursultan Orakovich

Area
  - Total: 9,600 sq mi (24,900 km^{2})

Population (2013)
  - Total: 31,244
- Time zone: UTC+5 (West)

Kyzylkoga District (Kazakh: Қызылқоға ауданы, romanized: Qyzylqoğa audany) is a district of Atyrau Region in Kazakhstan. The administrative center of the district is the selo of Miyaly. Population: 31,244 (2013 estimate); 30,488 (2009 census results); 30,915 (1999 census results).
