= Time in Kazakhstan =

- Time zone
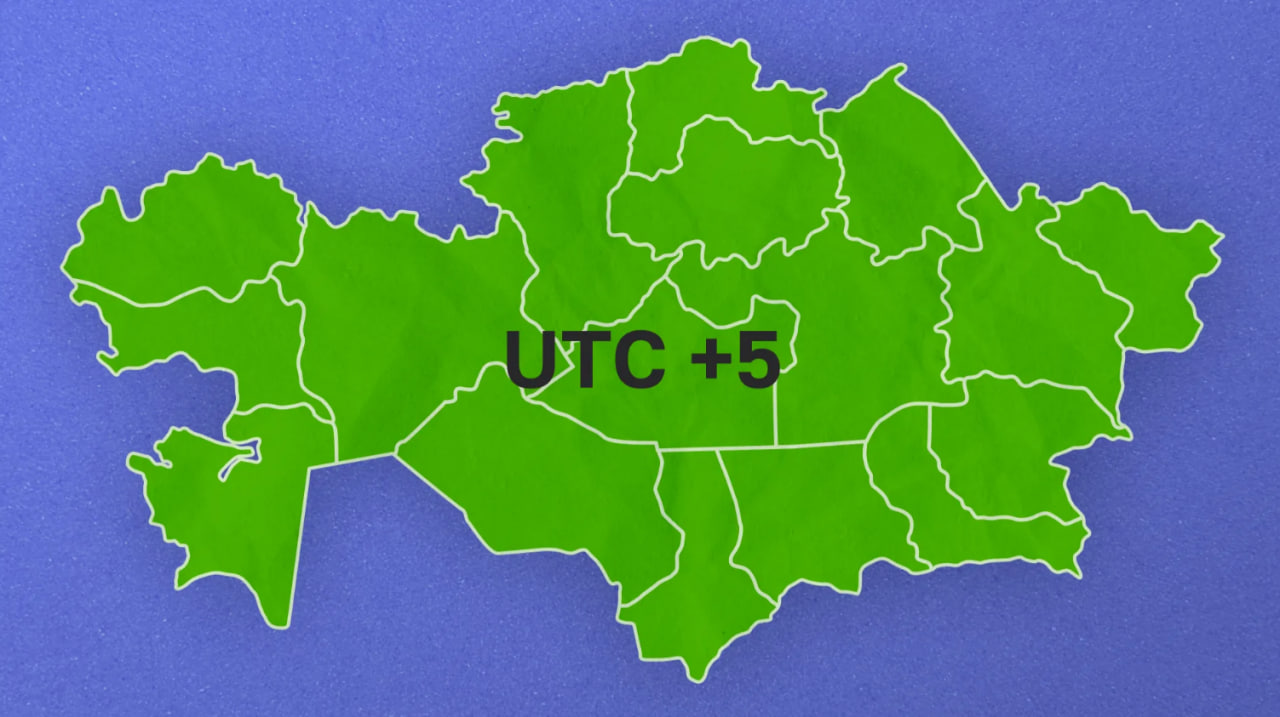
- Map of Kazakhstan time zones

UTC offset
- UTC: UTC+05:00

Current time
- 22:18, 30 March 2026 UTC+05:00 [refresh]

Observance of DST
- DST is not observed in this time zone.

Time in Kazakhstan (Note: Kazakh: Қазақстандағы уақыт, Qazaqstandağy uaqyt; Russian: Время в Казахстане) is governed by the decree "On the Procedure for Calculating Time on the Territory of the Republic of Kazakhstan", (Note: Kazakh: "Қазақстан Республикасы аумағында уақыт есептеу тәртібі туралы", "Qazaqstan Respublikasy aumağynda uaqyt esepteu tärtıbı turaly"; Russian: "О порядке исчисления времени на территории Республики Казахстан") which establishes a single time zone: UTC+05:00 (effective since 1 March 2024). Kazakhstan spans a longitudinal difference of 40°45′ between its easternmost and westernmost points, resulting in a difference in local solar time of 2 hours and 43 minutes.

Daylight saving time (DST) is no longer observed, having been abolished in 2005.

== Legislative framework ==
Between 1992 and 2023, timekeeping in Kazakhstan retained a legislative practice characteristic of the former Soviet system. Despite having formal administrative time zones (the 4th and 5th zones during this period), time was consistently calculated one hour ahead of zone time: UTC+5 was used in the 4th time zone instead of UTC+4, and UTC+6 in the 5th zone instead of UTC+5.

This practice was eliminated by a January 19, 2024 amendment to Government Decree No. 1749 "On the Procedure for Calculating Time", which repealed the relevant provision (formerly Paragraph 3 of the decree).

== History ==
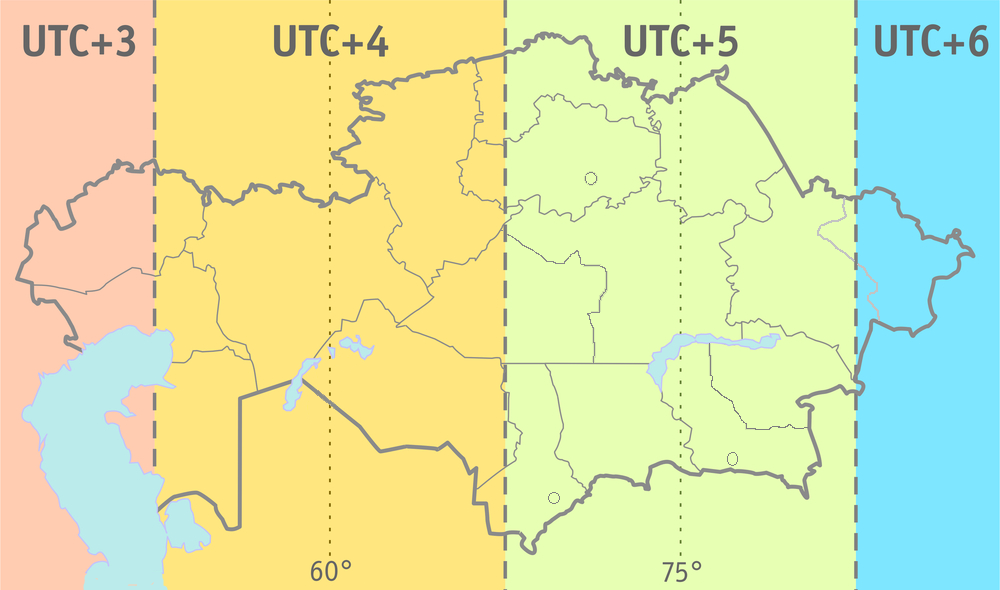
Geographical time zones on the territory of Kazakhstan

The territory of Kazakhstan was part of the USSR from 1924. During the Soviet period, a decree on 8 February 1919 established administrative time zones across the RSFSR, which included the territory of what would become the Kazakh SSR. Initially, Kazakhstan was divided into four time zones (the 3rd, 4th, 5th, and 6th), whose borders roughly corresponded to geographical lines. The implementation of these zones began on 1 July 1919 and continued over the following years; for instance, Kostanay Region (then the Kustanaysky Uyezd of the Chelyabinsk Governorate) joined the 4th time zone on 1 January 1920. In 1930–1931, the entire Soviet Union introduced Decree Time, advancing all clocks by one hour ahead of their standard zone time. This shifted Kazakhstan's offsets to UTC+4, UTC+5, UTC+6, and UTC+7.

A decision by the interdepartmental commission at the Council of Ministers of the USSR on 28 May 1956 led to a major reform effective 1 March 1957, which consolidated Kazakhstan into just two time zones. The 4th time zone now observed UTC+5, and the 5th observed UTC+6. This was achieved by advancing the clock an additional hour in the westernmost districts of the West Kazakhstan (including Uralsk) and Atyrau (including Guryev) regions, while eastern districts of the East Kazakhstan Region reverted to their standard zone time, effectively canceling Decree Time there. A 1980 government decree formalized these boundaries, dividing the regions as follows:

- 4th time zone (UTC+5): Uralsk, Guryev, Mangyshlak, Aktyubinsk, Kustanay, and Kzyl-Orda regions.
- 5th time zone (UTC+6): Tselinograd, North Kazakhstan, Kokchetav, Turgay, Karaganda, Pavlodar, Dzhezkazgan, Chimkent, Dzhambul, Alma-Ata, Taldy-Kurgan, Semipalatinsk, and East Kazakhstan regions.

Annual daylight saving time (DST) was introduced in 1981, after which the western part of Kazakhstan used UTC+6 in the summer and the eastern part used UTC+7. A notable change occurred in March 1989, when the Uralsk Region did not advance its clocks for DST (which would have been to UTC+6). As parts of the region were already on an effective "zone time plus 2 hours", this change meant that while officially remaining in the 4th zone, it began observing UTC+5 year-round, aligning with the 3rd zone's daylight time. This resulted in Kazakhstan using three different offsets during standard (winter) time:

- UTC+4: Uralsk Region
- UTC+5: Guryev, Mangyshlak, Aktyubinsk, Kustanay, and Kzyl-Orda regions
- UTC+6: All other regions

In 1991, with the impending dissolution of the USSR, Decree Time was abolished across most of the Union, including Kazakhstan (with the exception of Uralsk Region), though seasonal DST was kept. As a result, when DST began on 31 March, only Uralsk Region advanced its clocks. After the return to standard time on 29 September, Kazakhstan was left with two time zones: UTC+4 and UTC+5. (Note: Subsequent events indicate that Kyzylorda Region, although officially in the 4th time zone, was using UTC+5 on the eve of 1992. This suggests that Decree Time was not abolished in Uralsk Region in 1991 and may have been restored in Kyzylorda Region in the autumn of that year.)

After gaining independence, Kazakhstan reinstated Decree Time in 1992. According to a government decree on 13 January 1992, clocks across the country were advanced by one hour on 19 January. A government resolution also moved Kyzylorda Region to the 5th time zone, placing it on UTC+6. However, just before the switch to DST, another resolution on 27 March reversed this for two specific regions by canceling the "one-hour advance of zone time, in effect permanently throughout the year" for Uralsk and Kyzylorda while maintaining the official placement of these regions in the 4th and 5th time zones, respectively. Consequently, these two regions did not advance their clocks on 29 March. This series of changes returned Kazakhstan to the three-offset system (UTC+4, UTC+5, and UTC+6 during standard time) that had been in place from 1989 to 1990.

Further adjustments occurred in the 1990s. In September 1994, the Mangystau (former Mangyshlak) Region switched to the UTC+4 time already in effect in the West Kazakhstan (former Uralsk) Region; this was achieved during the autumn DST change by turning its clocks back two hours instead of one. From 1996, the annual return from DST was shifted a month later to the last Sunday in October, aligning with many other countries, including Russia. In 1999, Atyrau Region also moved to UTC+4; it achieved this by skipping the spring DST advance and then turning its clocks back one hour in autumn with the other regions.

=== 2004–2005 reforms and end of DST ===
On 23 November 2000, Government Decree No. 1749 was issued "in order to streamline the calculation of time on the territory of the Republic of Kazakhstan and in connection with changes in the administrative-territorial structure." This decree maintained DST and the division into two official time zones, but with three distinct time offsets in use:

- 4th zone: UTC+4 (Uralsk, Atyrau, Aktau) and UTC+5 (Aktobe, Kostanay, Kyzylorda)
- 5th zone: UTC+6 (all other regions)

This resolution also returned Kyzylorda Region to the 4th time zone, reversing the 1992 change.

The path to abolishing DST began with a confusing series of reforms in 2004. An initial amendment on 20 July 2004 proposed creating a system with a two-hour time difference across the country. The plan was for Kostanay and Kyzylorda to remain on summer time (UTC+6) in autumn 2004, while Aktobe would not observe DST in spring 2005, effectively joining UTC+4. This confusing plan, which generated public uncertainty as it did not specify exact dates for the clock changes, was amended just weeks before the autumn clock change.

This new amendment, issued on 15 October 2004, reversed this approach, aiming instead to reduce the time difference across the country to a single hour. The four western regions of Kazakhstan were to have a 1-hour difference with the time in the capital, Astana. To achieve this, the plan for Aktobe to move to UTC+4 was scrapped. It was stipulated that Uralsk, Atyrau, and Aktau would also remain on their summer time. Thus, on 31 October 2004, five regions did not turn their clocks back. Kostanay and Kyzylorda moved permanently to UTC+6, while West Kazakhstan, Atyrau, and Mangystau regions moved to UTC+5.

Finally, on 15 March 2005, the government abolished daylight saving time altogether with Government Decree No. 231. The reform had the following effects on regional centers:

- Returned to a historical winter offset: Aktau (UTC+5, as used 1931–1994), Atyrau and Uralsk (UTC+5, a "decree time + 1 hour" offset used 1957–1999 and 1957–1989, respectively).
- Retained their existing winter offset: Aktobe, Petropavl, Kokshetau, Shymkent, Taraz, Karaganda, Pavlodar, Taldykorgan, and Ust-Kamenogorsk all remained on their long-standing "zone time plus 1 hour" or standard zone time offsets.
- Switched to permanent daylight time: Kostanay and Kyzylorda adopted UTC+6, an offset two hours ahead of their standard time. (Note: In Kyzylorda, this time was in effect during the winter period from January 19 to March 29, 1992.)

=== Later reforms and unification ===
Public dissatisfaction with some decisions made during the 2004–2005 reform persisted for years afterward. For example, proposals emerged to reinstate UTC+5 in the Kostanay and Kyzylorda regions. The issue was formally raised again in 2017, when a parliamentary deputy inquired with the Prime Minister about implementing this change.

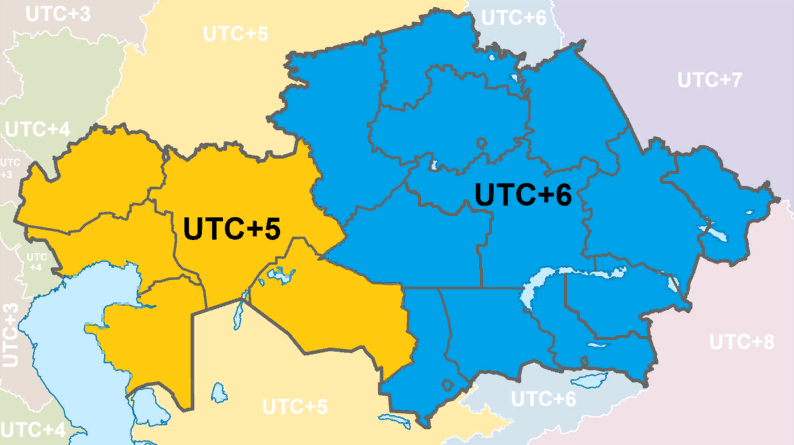
Time in Kazakhstan from 21 December 2018 to 29 February 2024

Partly in response to this, a government decree on 7 December 2018, which amended the original 2000 decree, changed the time zone boundary. Kyzylorda Region was moved into the 4th time zone, with its time changing to UTC+5. The change took effect on the night of 20–21 December 2018, when clocks in the region were turned back one hour. From that date until 29 February 2024, Kazakhstan used two time zones:

- UTC+5: West Kazakhstan, Atyrau, Mangystau, Aktobe, and Kyzylorda regions.
- UTC+6: All other regions, including Astana and Almaty.

Despite the change in Kyzylorda, residents in Kostanay continued to campaign for a similar move, again raising the issue in 2019 and 2020. A 2021 regional vote on the issue, organized by city and district public councils, showed a lack of majority support. Out of 44,486 participants, 16,135 (36.3%) voted for the change, 26,201 (58.9%) voted against, and 2,150 (4.8%) abstained. The debate continued, and in December 2022, a meeting was held in Kostanay between regional officials and an initiative group, prompted by Bolat Nurkhozhaev, a public council member from the Kyzylorda region.

The persistent debate prompted a national review. In 2021, the Ministry of Industry and Infrastructural Development began gathering opinions on a proposal, put forward by specialists from the Fesenkov Astrophysical Institute, to unify the entire country under UTC+5. It was supported by the Institute of Genetics and Physiology and the Institute of Geography and Water Security, with the latter noting the need for preliminary research into potential health and economic impacts.

In 2023, the proposal was studied by the Ministry of Ecology and Natural Resources jointly with the Ministry of Trade and Integration. That February, a working group was created, comprising deputies, representatives of central government bodies, public members, and scientific organizations. At its final meeting, the group formally endorsed the move to a single time zone, proposing the change for midnight (00:00) on 1 March 2024. In December 2023, a draft of the new decree was submitted for public discussion, but the majority of online comments were in opposition, particularly from residents of Almaty and the East Kazakhstan Region. Despite this, the decree was signed on 19 January and the change took effect on the proposed date.

In 2024, the petition "Turn the Time Back"—posted on the E-Petition.kz portal and gathering enough votes for official consideration—was reviewed by a working group under the Ministry of Trade and Integration. Following the review, the decision was made to "reject the petition". However, the group highlighted the need for further research, as well as clarifying to organizations and businesses the possibility of adjusting work schedules based on daylight hours.

=== Timeline of time changes by city ===
Below are the administrative centers and largest cities (as of 2019) of Kazakhstan's regions, showing their UTC time offsets from 1924 to present. Offsets exclude daylight saving time adjustments—asterisks (*) indicate expected offsets after autumn clock changes. Cities are ordered by longitude (west to east). Parentheses show either exact change dates or years (with exact dates detailed after the list).

- Uralsk: +3 (1924), +4 (1931), +5 (1957), +4* (26 March 1989), +5 (1992), +4* (29 March 1992), +5 (2004)
- Atyrau: +3 (1924), +4 (1931), +5 (1957), +4* (1991), +5 (1992), +4* (28 March 1999), +5 (2004)
- Aktau: +4 (1924), +5 (1931), +4* (1991), +5 (1992), +4 (25 September 1994), +5 (2004)
- Aktobe: +4 (1924), +5 (1931), +4* (1991), +5 (1992)
- Kostanay: +4 (1924), +5 (1931), +4* (1991), +5 (1992), +6 (2004), +5 (2024)
- Kyzylorda: +4 (1924), +5 (1931), +4* (1991), +5 (29 September 1991, presumably), +6 (1992), +5* (29 March 1992), +6 (2004), +5 (21 December 2018)
- Jezkazgan, Turkistan, Petropavl, Kokshetau, Shymkent, Taraz, Astana, Karaganda, Almaty, Pavlodar, Taldykorgan, Semey: +5 (1924), +6 (1931), +5* (1991), +6 (1992), +5 (2024)
- Ust-Kamenogorsk: +6 (1924), +7 (1931), +6 (1957), +5* (1991), +6 (1992), +5 (2024)

Exact change dates:

- 2 May 1924
- 9 February 1931
- 1 March 1957
- 31 March 1991
- 19 January 1992
- 31 October 2004
- 1 March 2024

== Relationship to solar time ==
The divergence between current official time and local mean solar time is measured by how much mean noon (when the sun is highest) deviates from 12:00 under the current time system. The table below shows this deviation for regional administrative centers and major cities, calculated from their geographical coordinates:

City	Mean solar noon
Aktau	13:35
Uralsk (Note: The current time is 2 hours ahead of the standard time established in 1924.)	13:35
Atyrau	13:33
Aktobe	13:11
Kostanay	12:46
Kyzylorda	12:38
Jezkazgan	12:29
Turkistan	12:27
Petropavl	12:23
Kokshetau	12:22
Shymkent	12:22
Taraz	12:15
Astana	12:14
Karaganda	12:08
Almaty	11:52
Pavlodar	11:52
Taldykorgan	11:48
Semey	11:39
Ust-Kamenogorsk (Note: The current time is 1 hour behind the standard time established in 1924.)	11:30

== IANA time zone database ==
The tz database identifies seven zones for Kazakhstan.

c.c.	Coordinates	Timezone name	Comments	UTC offset	Covered area
KZ	+4315+07657	Asia/Almaty	most of Kazakhstan	+05:00	most areas
KZ	+4448+06528	Asia/Qyzylorda	Qyzylorda/Kyzylorda/Kzyl-Orda	+05:00	Qyzylorda
KZ	+5312+06337	Asia/Qostanay	Qostanay/Kostanay/Kustanay	+05:00	Qostanai
KZ	+5017+05710	Asia/Aqtobe	Aqtöbe/Aktobe	+05:00	Aqtobe
KZ	+4431+05016	Asia/Aqtau	Mangghystaū/Mankistau	+05:00	Mangystau
KZ	+4707+05156	Asia/Atyrau	Atyraū/Atirau/Gur’yev	+05:00	Atyrau
KZ	+5113+05121	Asia/Oral	West Kazakhstan	+05:00	West Kazakhstan

According to an email on the tz mailing list, Qostanay Region could be part of Asia/Qyzylorda.
