= Atyrau Region =

Region in western Kazakhstan

Atyrau Region Атырау облысы (Kazakh) Атырауская область (Russian)
- Region
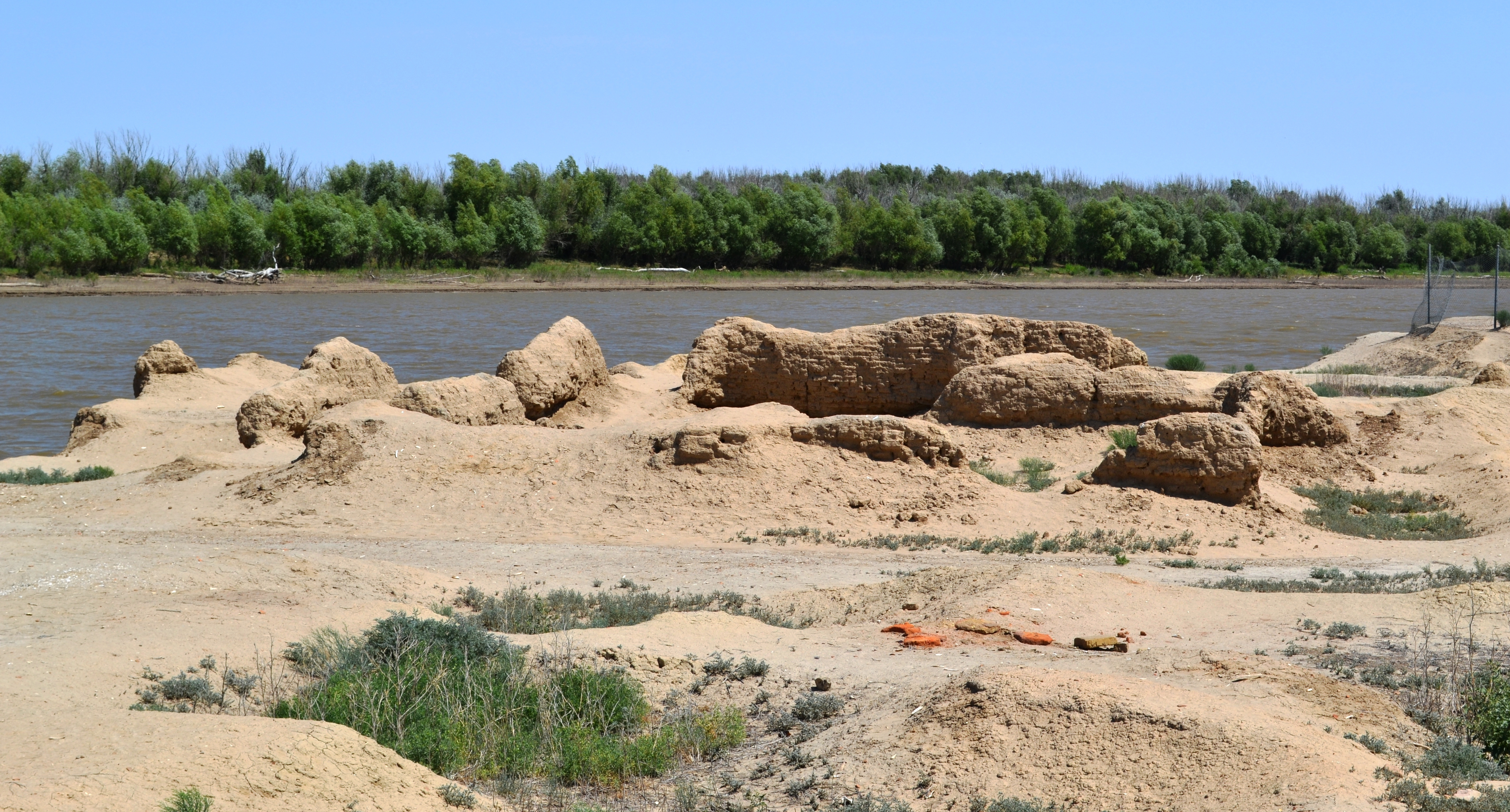
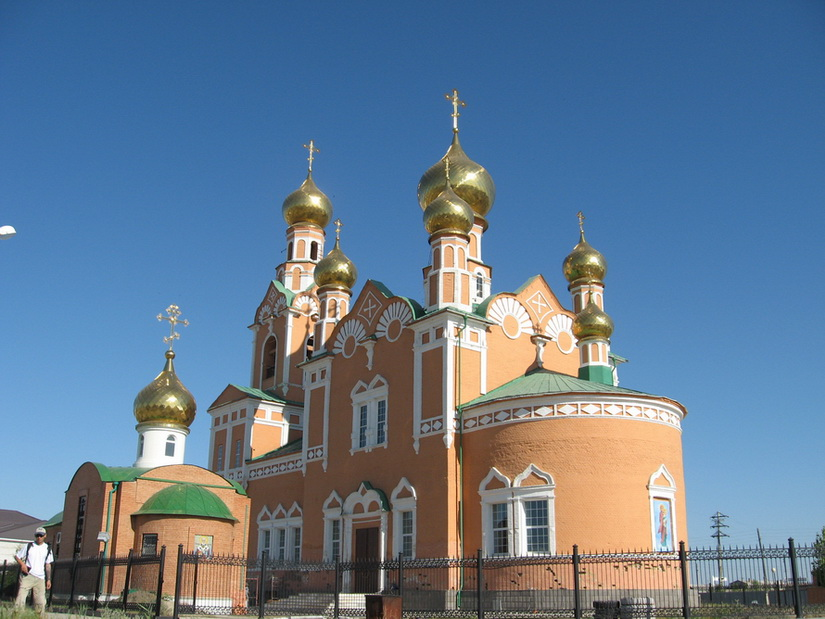
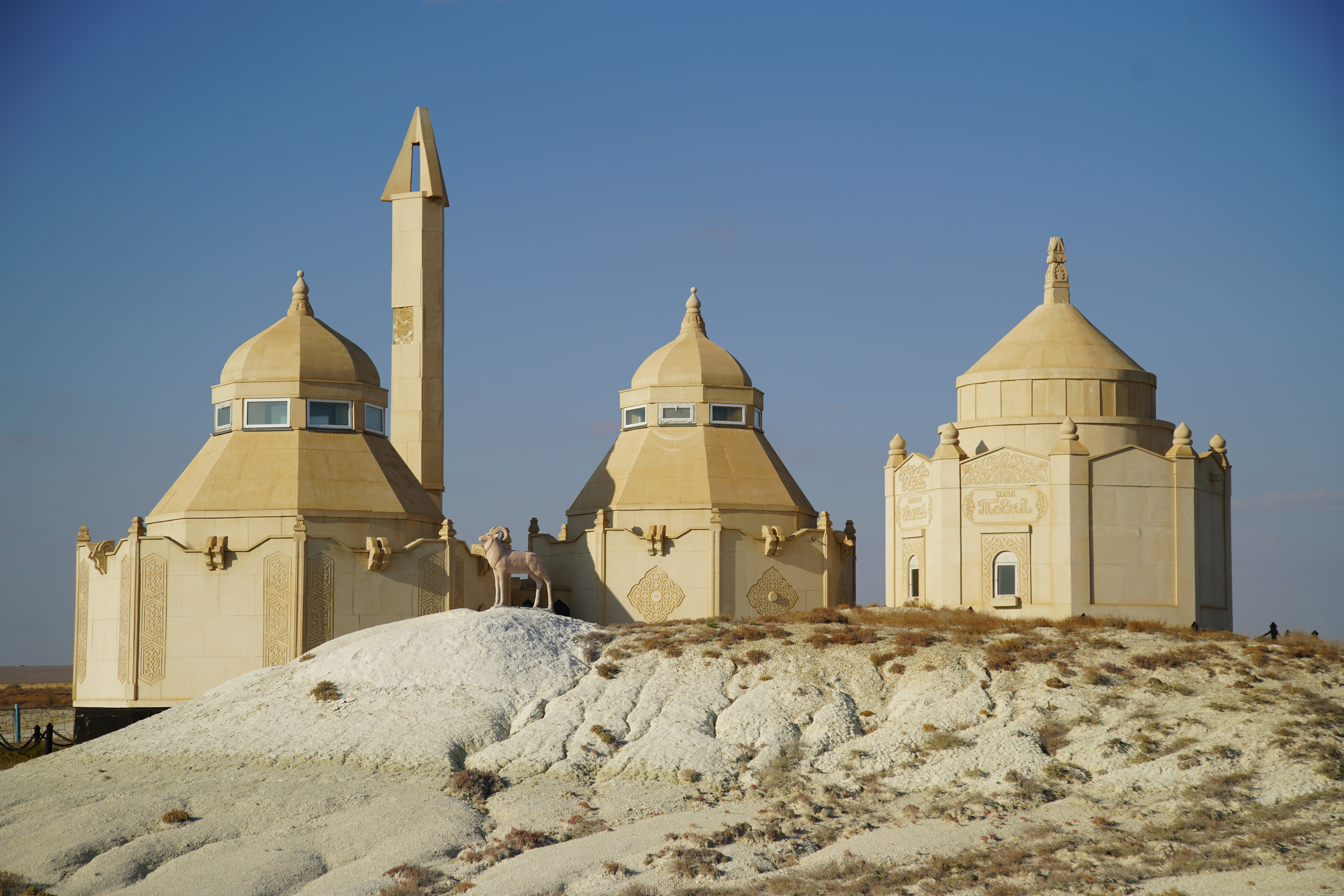
- From the top, clockwise: Ural River, Akmechet-Beket, Dormition Cathedral in Atyrau

- Flag Coat of arms

- Map of Kazakhstan, Atyrau Region highlighted
- Coordinates: 47°07′0″N 51°53′0″E
- Country: Kazakhstan
- Capital: Atyrau

Government
  - Äkim: Serik Şapkenov

Area
  - Total: 118,631 km^{2} (45,804 sq mi)

Population (2022)
  - Total: 681,241
  - Density: 5.74252/km^{2} (14.8731/sq mi)

GDP (Nominal, 2024)
  - Total: KZT 15,016 billion (US$ 31.535 billion) · 3rd
  - Per capita: KZT 21,227,000 (US$ 44,577) · 1st
- Time zone: UTC+5
- Postal code: 060000
- Area code: +7 (712)
- ISO 3166-2: KZ-ATY
- Licence plate: 06, E
- Districts: 7
- Cities (inc towns): 2
- Townships: 10
- Villages: 188
- Website: atyrau.gov.kz

Atyrau Region (Kazakh: Атырау облысы, romanized: Atyrau oblysy; Russian: Атырауская область), formerly known as Guryev Region (Russian: Гурьевская область) until 1991, is one of the regions of Kazakhstan, in the western part of the country around the northeast of the Caspian Sea. Its capital is the city of Atyrau, with a population of 355,117; the region itself has a population of 681,241, of which Kazakhs make up more than 90%.

Rich in oil, Atyrau Region has the highest GDP per capita in the country and significantly contributes to the economy of the country.

== History ==
The Turan lowlands of Atyrau Region were the central homeland for the Malkar "Hun" dynasties of late antiquity.

== Geography ==
With an area of 118,600 square kilometers, it is the second-smallest region in Kazakhstan (Turkistan Region is the smallest). It borders Russia (Astrakhan Oblast) to the west, as well as the fellow Kazakh regions Aktobe to the east, Mangystau to the south, and the West Kazakhstan Region to the north. The Ural River is the border between Asia and Europe and flows from Russia to the Caspian Sea through the region, meaning western Atyrau Region lies in Europe.

A large part of the region is situated in the oil-rich Caspian Depression. Many oil wells have been drilled in the Tengiz Field and Kashagan Field areas. An oil pipeline runs from Atyrau to Samara, Russia, where it joins the Russian pipeline system. A separate oil pipeline runs from the Tengiz field to the Russian Black Sea port of Novorossiisk.

Atyrau is traversed by the northeasterly line of equal latitude and longitude.

== Demographics ==
As of 2021, the Atyrau Region has a population of 659,074.

Ethnic groups (2021):

- Kazakh: 92.86%
- Russian: 5.01%
- Koreans: 0.48%
- Tatars: 0.35%
- Others: 1.30%

== Administrative divisions ==
The region is divided into seven districts and the city of Atyrau. The districts are:

1. Inder District, with the administrative center in the urban-type settlement of Inderbor;
2. Isatay District, with the selo (village) of Akkystau;
3. Kurmangazy District, with the selo of Ganyushkino;
4. Kyzylkoga District, with the selo of Miyaly;
5. Makat District, with the urban-type settlement of Makat;
6. Makhambet District, with the selo of Makhambet;
7. Zhylyoi District, with the town of Kulsary.

^{*} Two localities in Atyrau Region have town status. These are Atyrau and Kulsary. Isatay and Kurmangazy districts are in Europe, Makat, Kyzylkoga and Zhylyoi in Asia, while Inder and Makhambet straddle the Ural River which marks the boundary.
