= Soviet census =

Summary of censuses carried out in the Soviet Union

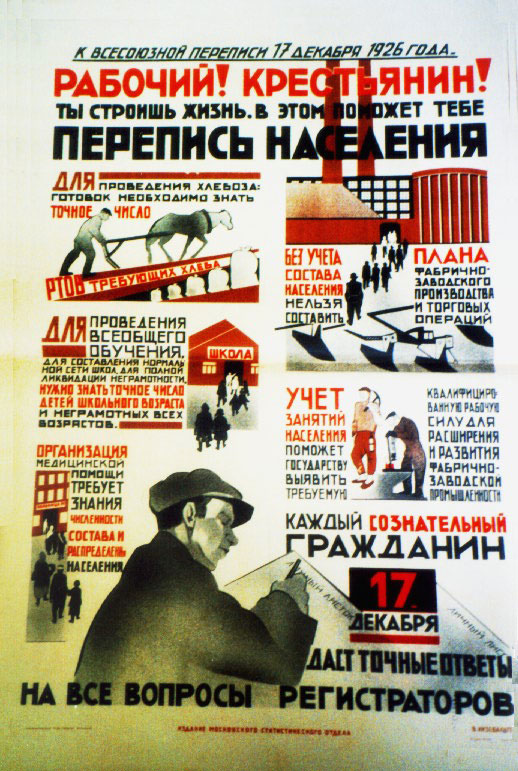
Poster for the 1926 Census in the Soviet

The following is a summary of censuses carried out in the Soviet Union:

Year	Territory (km^{2})	Total population	Rank	Density per km^{2}	Change	Urban population	Share	Males	Share	Females	Share	Largest city	Second largest city	Third largest city	Ethnic Russians	Share	Ethnic minorities	Notes
1926	21 176 187	147 027 915	3rd	▼6.94	▲7.5%	26 314 114	▲17.9%	71 043 352	▼48.3%	75 984 563	▲51.7%	Moscow (2 025 947)	Leningrad (1 590 770)	Kiev (513 637)	77 791 124	▲52.9%	Ukrainians; (31 194 976); Belarusians; (4 738 923)	(Note: The first full-scale census in the Soviet Union.)
1937	21 176 187	162 039 470	3rd	▲7.65	▲10.2%	43 729 514	▲27.0%	75 789 892	▼46.8%	84 331 656	▲53.2%	Moscow (3 798 078)	Leningrad (est. 2 814 500)	Kiev (775 850)	93 933 065	▲58.0%	Ukrainians; (26 421 212); Belarusians; (4 874 061)	(Note: Initially set to take place in 1933, but was delayed multiple times due to Joseph Stalin's policies of collectivization, forced famine and political repression. The only one-day census in the Russian history. Proclaimed defective by the Soviet government in September 1937.)
1939	21 176 187	170 557 093	4th	▲8.05	▲5.3%	56 125 139	▲32.9%	81 694 889	▲48.0%	88 862 204	▼52.0%	Moscow (4 131 633)	Leningrad (3 191 304)	Kiev (846 724)	99 591 520	▲58.4%	Ukrainians; (28 111 007); Belarusians; (5 275 393)	(Note: Took place instead of the "defective" 1937 census.)
1959	22 402 200	208 826 650	3rd	▲9.32	▲22.4%	99 977 695	▲47.9%	94 050 303	▼45.0%	114 776 347	▲55.0%	Moscow (5 045 905)	Leningrad (3 121 196)	Kiev (1 104 334)	114 113 579	▼54.6%	Ukrainians; (37 252 930); Belarusians; (7 913 488)	(Note: The population increased markedly as a result of the Soviet Union's territorial expansion by World War II.)
1970	22 402 200	241 720 134	3rd	▲10.79	▲15.7%	135 991 514	▲56.2%	111 399 377	▲46.1%	130 320 757	▼53.9%	Moscow (6 941 961)	Leningrad (3 949 501)	Kiev (1 631 908)	129 015 140	▼53.4%	Ukrainians; (40 753 246); Uzbeks; (9 195 093)	
1979	22 402 200	262 436 227	3rd	▲11.71	▲8.6%	163 585 944	▲62.3%	122 328 833	▲46.6%	140 107 394	▼53.4%	Moscow (7 830 509)	Leningrad (4 588 183)	Kiev (2 143 855)	137 397 089	▼52.3%	Ukrainians; (42 347 387); Uzbeks; (12 455 978)	
1989	22 402 200	286 730 817	3rd	▲12.80	▲9.3%	188 813 355	▲65.8%	135 360 790	▲47.2%	151 370 027	▼52.8%	Moscow (8 769 117)	Leningrad (5 023 506)	Kiev (2 587 945)	145 155 489	▼50.6%	Ukrainians; (44 186 006); Uzbeks; (16 697 825)	(Note: The last census of the Soviet Union.)

== See also ==
- Russian census
- Censuses in Ukraine
