= Censuses in Ukraine =

Censuses in Ukraine (Ukrainian: Переписи населення України, romanized: Perepysy naselennja Ukrainy) is a sporadic event that since 2001 has been conducted by the State Statistics Committee of Ukraine under the jurisdiction of the Government of Ukraine.

== History ==
=== The first steps ===
The first official census in the territory of Ukraine took place in 1818 when Western Ukraine was part of the Austrian Empire. However a modern census did not take place until 1857. Since then the next censuses took place in the dual-power state of the Austria-Hungary in 1869, 1880, 1890, 1900, 1910. Those last five censuses also included the territory of the today Zakarpattia Oblast which was part of the Kingdom of Hungary. The further censuses discontinued as the country fell apart. The rest of Ukraine which was part of Russian Empire conducted its first census as part of the 1897 Russian Census. The next national census in Russia did not take place until after World War I and the formation of the Soviet Union. A city-census of Kyiv took place in March 1919, after the Bolsheviks occupied the city. In 1920, a census was conducted only in those areas of Ukraine that were not involved in the Russian Civil War.

=== Interwar censuses ===
The next census conducted in most of the territory of Western Ukraine (Eastern Galicia) was the Polish census of 1921, while the 1921 Czechoslovakia Census took place on the territory of the Zakarpattia Oblast. In 1930 another census took place in both regions as part of their respective national censuses that were conducted in the same year. Also the area of today Chernivtsi Oblast saw its first national census in 1930 for the first time since the last one that was conducted in the Austria-Hungary in 1910, while the area of Budjak of today Odessa Oblast along with the rest of Bessarabia had the Russian demographic statistic data back from 1897. Already during the World War II one more census took place in 1941 in Hungary which previously sacked and occupied the territory of Carpatho-Ukraine (today Zakarpattia Oblast). As it was mentioned before, the first national Russian Census since 1897 took place only in 1926 as part of the First All-Union Census in the USSR. The next census in the Soviet Union took place in 1937, but it was recognized as unofficial and was never disclosed. The census was also recognized as a conspiracy against the Soviet regime. Just before the World War II in 1939, the Soviet Union conducted another census that was accepted as the official one.

=== Post-War censuses ===
After World War II, Ukraine was united in its current borders (including Crimea) and within the Soviet Union. The first Soviet census after the war took place in 1959, followed by three more in 1970, 1979 and 1989. The next planned census never took place as the Soviet Union dissolved in 1991.

=== Post-Soviet ===
The first (and so far only) national census of Ukraine took place in 2001. It was originally planned that the next one would follow in 2011, but it has been repeatedly postponed.

=== Summary ===
Year	Territory (km^{2})	Total population	Density per km^{2}	Change	Urban population	Share	Males	Share	Females	Share	Largest city	Second largest city	Ukrainian language share	Ethnic minorities	Notes
1897	518 713	23 430 407	45.17	0.0%	3 085 341	13.2%	11 780 525	50.3%	11 649 882	49.7%	Odessa (403 800)	Kiev (247 700)	72.6%	(Russia) Russians; (2 767 952); (Israel) Jews; (1 908 465)	(Note: Territory includes Ukrainian-populated governorates of the Russian Empire (Volhynia, Podolia, Kiev, Chernigov, Kharkov, Kherson, Yekaterinoslav, Taurida and Poltava). Ukrainian language labeled in the census as the Little Russian dialect of the Russian language.)
1926	451 584	29 018 187	▲64.25	▲23.8%	5 373 553	▲18.5%	14 094 592	▼48.6%	14 923 595	▲51.4%	Kiev (513 637)	Odessa (420 862)	▲77.0%	(Russia) Russians; (2 677 166); (Israel) Jews; (1 574 391)	(Note: The first census under the Soviet Union as its constituent republic.)
1937	451 584	28 387 609	▼62.93	▼2.2%	9 561 767	▲33.7%	13 117 514	▼46.2%	15 270 095	▲53.8%	Kiev (775 850}	Kharkov (759 385)	—	(Russia) Russians; (3 221 898); (Israel) Jews; (1 470 484)	(Note: Population estimate of Kiev as of 1930. Results proclaimed defective in September 1937.)
1939	451 584	30 946 218	▲68.53	▲10.5%	11 190 370	▲36.2%	14 753 566	▼47.7%	16 192 652	▲52.3%	Kiev (846 724)	Kharkov (832 913)	—	(Russia) Russians; (4 175 299); (Israel) Jews; (1 532 776)	
1959	603 700	41 869 046	▲69.35	▲35.3%	19 419 783	▲46.4%	18 575 382	▼44.4%	23 293 664	▲55.6%	Kiev (1 104 334)	Kharkov (934 136)	—	(Russia) Russians; (7 090 813); (Israel) Jews; (840 311)	(Note: Includes Volhynia, Galicia, and Transcarpathia annexed by the USSR in 1939 and assigned to it after World War II, along with Crimea, transferred to Ukraine from the Russian SFSR in 1954.)
1970	603 700	47 126 517	▲78.06	▲12.5%	25 688 560	▲54.5%	21 305 320	▲45.2%	25 821 197	▼54.8%	Kiev (1 631 908)	Kharkov (1 222 852)	—	(Russia) Russians; (9 126 331); (Israel) Jews; (775 993)	
1979	603 700	49 754 642	▲82.42	▲5.6%	30 511 530	▲61.3%	22 743 513	▲45.7%	27 011 129	▼54.3%	Kiev (2 143 855)	Kharkov (1 443 754)	—	(Russia) Russians; (10 471 602); (Israel) Jews; (632 610)	
1989	603 700	51 706 742	▲85.65	▲3.9%	34 587 662	▲66.9%	23 907 764	▲46.2%	27 798 978	▼53.8%	Kiev (2 587 945)	Kharkov (1 609 959)	▼64.3%	(Russia) Russians; (11 355 582); (Israel) Jews; (486 326)	
2001	603 700	48 457 100	▼80.27	▼6.3%	32 574 500	▲67.2%	22 441 400	▲46.3%	26 015 700	▼53.7%	Kyiv (2 615 300)	Kharkiv (1 470 902)	▲67.5%	(Russia) Russians; (8 334 141); (Moldova) Moldovans; (409 608)	(Note: The first census after Ukraine gained independence from the Soviet Union.)
1 Feb 2022 estimate	603 700	43 415 201	▼71.91	▼10.4%	29 867 569	▲68.8%	20 052 573	▼46.2%	23 362 627	▲53.8%	Kyiv (2 890 432)	Kharkiv (1 421 125)	—	—	(Note: Includes the Autonomous Republic of Crimea, Sevastopol, and parts of Donetsk and Luhansk oblasts annexed by the Russian Federation between 2014 and 2022. Data from Crimea taken as of 2014. Urban population percentage as of 2018. Male and female population percentage as of 2013. Kyiv population as of 2015. Estimate taken before the Russian invasion.)

==== Western Ukraine under Poland, 1921–1931 ====
Year	Territory (km^{2})	Total population	Density per km^{2}	Change	Urban population	Share	Males	Share	Females	Share	Largest city	Second largest city	Ukrainian language share	Ethnic minorities	Notes
1921	91 920	6 923 632	75.32	0.0%	1 235 937	17.8%	3 318 670	47.9%	3 604 962	52.1%	Lwów (219 400)	Stanisławów (51 391)	56.3%	—	(Note: Territory includes Ukrainian-populated voivodeships of interwar Poland (Volhynia, Tarnopol, Lwow and Stanislawow). Ukrainian language labeled as Ruthenian.)
1931	91 920	7 981 443	▲86.83	▲15.3%	—	—	3 861 055	▲48.4%	4 120 388	▼51.6%	Lwów (312 231)	Stanisławów (60 626)	▼40.4%	—	
