= List of Russian censuses =

Census of the population of Russia

General Population Census of the Russian Federation Всеобщая перепись населения Российской Федерации Vseobshchaya perepis' naseleniya Rossiyskoy Federatsiyi
- Frequency: Decennially (since 2010)
- Country: Russia
- Inaugurated: February 9, 1897; 129 years ago
- Most recent: October 1, 2021; 5 years ago
- Next event: 2031
- Organiser: Ministry of Internal Affairs (1897–1917); Central Statistical Directorate (1918–1987); State Committee for Statistics (1987–1991); Federal State Statistics Service (since 1991)
- Website: gks.ru

A Russian census is a census of the population of Russia. Such a census has occurred at various irregular points in the history of Russia.

Introduced in 1897 during the Russian Empire, the census took place decennially since 2010 according to the UN standards. Preparing and organizing the census is under the authority of the Federal State Statistics Service, branch of the Ministry of Economic Development since 2017.

== History ==
Year	Territory (km^{2})	Total population	Rank	Density per km^{2}	Change	Urban population	Share	Males	Share	Females	Share	Largest city	Second largest city	Ethnic Russians	Share	Ethnic minorities	Notes
1897	20 121 420	125 640 021	3rd	6.24	0.0%	16 828 395	13.4%	62 477 348	49.7%	63 162 673	50.3%	St. Petersburg (1 264 920)	Moscow (est. 1 038 625)	55 667 469	44.3%	(Ukraine) Ukrainians; (22 380 551); (Tatarstan) (Azerbaijan) (Crimean Tatars) Turks; (13 373 867)	(Note: The first census in Russian history. The first and only census of the Russian Empire. The overall territory of the Empire comprised est. 22 440 000 km^{2}, but the 1897 census excluded the Grand Duchy of Finland except the capital city Helsingfors (Helsinki). Along with the numbers presented, the census also shows 13,276 of Finland's Russian population, 13,158 abroad travelling on warships, 10,308 of the Russian population in the Protectorate of Bukhara and 3,919 in the Khanate of Khiva. Ukrainians labeled as Little Russians. Turks include the turkic peoples of Russia, i.e. Tatars, Bashkirs, Kazakhs, Turkmens, Azerbaijanis, Crimean Tatars, etc.)
1920	est. 19 651 446	est. 136 800 000	3rd	▲6.96	▲8.9%	est. 20 900 000	▲15.3%	—	—	—	—	Moscow (est. 1 028 200)	Petrograd (est. 740 000)	—	—	—	(Note: Took place during the Russian Civil War and the Soviet-Polish War. Excluded Crimea, the Far East, the Northern Caucasus and other territories.)
1926	19 651 446	100 891 244	3rd	▼5.13	▼26.2%	17 442 655	▲17.3%	48 170 635	▼47.7%	52 720 609	▲52.3%	Moscow (2 025 947)	Leningrad (1 590 770)	74 072 096	▲73.4%	(Ukraine) Ukrainians; (7 873 331); (Kazakhstan) Kazakhs; (3 851 661)	(Note: The first full-scale census in the Soviet Union.)
1937	19 651 446	103 967 924	3rd	▲5.30	▲3.0%	34 373 245	▲33.1%	48 726 033	▼46.9%	55 241 891	▲53.1%	Moscow (3 798 078)	Leningrad (2 814 474)	85 361 394	▲82.1%	(Tatarstan) Tatars; (3 607 507); (Ukraine) Ukrainians; (3 087 022)	(Note: Initially set to take place in 1933, but was delayed multiple times due to Joseph Stalin's policies of collectivization, forced famine and political repression which lowered the population drastically. The only one-day census in the Russian history. Proclaimed defective by the Soviet government in September 1937.)
1939	19 651 446	109 397 463	6th	▲5.57	▲5.2%	36 875 233	▲33.7%	51 593 770	▲47.2%	57 803 693	▼52.8%	Moscow (4 131 633)	Leningrad (3 191 304)	90 306 276	▲82.5%	(Tatarstan) Tatars; (3 901 835); (Ukraine) Ukrainians; (3 359 184)	(Note: Took place instead of the "defective" 1937 census.)
1959	17 098 246	117 534 315	6th	▲6.87	▲7.4%	62 059 783	▲52.8%	52 424 767	▼44.6%	65 109 548	▲55.4%	Moscow (5 045 905)	Leningrad (3 121 196)	97 863 579	▲83.3%	(Tatarstan) Tatars; (4 074 253); (Ukraine) Ukrainians; (3 359 083)	(Note: The population increased markedly as a result of the Soviet Union's territorial expansion by World War II.)
1970	17 098 246	130 079 210	6th	▲7.61	▲10.7%	80 981 143	▲62.2%	59 324 787	▲45.6%	70 754 423	▼54.4%	Moscow (6 941 961)	Leningrad (3 949 501)	107 747 630	▼82.8%	(Tatarstan) Tatars; (4 755 061); (Ukraine) Ukrainians; (3 345 885)	
1979	17 098 246	137 550 949	6th	▲8.04	▲5.6%	95 373 867	▲69.3%	63 482 780	▲46.1%	74 068 169	▼53.9%	Moscow (7 830 509)	Leningrad (4 588 183)	113 521 881	▼82.6%	(Tatarstan) Tatars; (5 005 757); (Ukraine) Ukrainians; (3 657 647)	
1989	17 098 246	147 021 869	6th	▲8.60	▲7%	108 425 580	▲73.7%	69 039 087	▲46.9%	78 361 450	▼53.1%	Moscow (8 769 117)	Leningrad (5 023 506)	119 865 946	▼81.5%	(Tatarstan) Tatars; (5 522 096); (Ukraine) Ukrainians; (4 362 872)	(Note: The last census of the Soviet Union.)
2002	17 098 246	145 166 731	6th	▼8.49	▼1.5%	106 429 049	▼73.3%	67 605 133	▼46.6%	77 561 598	▲53.4%	Moscow (10 382 754)	St. Petersburg (4 661 219)	115 889 107	▼79.8%	(Tatarstan) Tatars; (5 554 601); (Ukraine) Ukrainians; (2 942 961)	(Note: The first census after the breakup of the USSR indicating a marked decline after the demographic crisis of the early 1990s. Compared to the population of the Soviet Union as of 1989, Russia lost 49.4% of the population, including approximately 30 million ethnic Russians.)
2010	17 098 246	142 856 536	9th	▼8.35	▼1.6%	105 313 773	▲73.7%	66 046 579	▼46.2%	76 809 957	▲53.8%	Moscow (11 503 501)	St. Petersburg (4 879 566)	111 016 896	▼77.7%	(Tatarstan) Tatars; (5 310 649); (Ukraine) Ukrainians; (1 927 988)	(Note: The first census carried out by UN standards.)
2021	17 125 191	147 182 123	9th	▲8.59	▲3.0%	110 075 322	▲74.8%	68 431 580	▲46.5%	78 750 543	▼53.5%	Moscow (13 010 112)	St. Petersburg (5 601 911)	105 579 179	▼71.7%	(Tatarstan) Tatars; (4 713 669); (Chechnya) Chechens; (1 674 854)	(Note: Includes Crimea, occupied and illegally annexed from Ukraine in 2014. Postponed in 2020 due to the COVID-19 pandemic.)

== See also ==
- Demographics of Russia
- Revision list
