= Next Ukrainian census =

Ukrainian census

Chart of the population of Ukraine from 1950 to 2025, showing a decline from 1993 to 2025

The next Ukrainian census is planned to be conducted by the State Statistics Service of Ukraine. The 2001 census was the most recent, and the only census conducted in independent Ukraine to date. The next census was to have been held ten years later, in 2011 (censuses should be conducted every ten years, according to standards set by the United Nations). However, the next census has been regularly delayed and a date for a new census has not been set.

The 2001 census recorded the population of Ukraine as 48,457,100 people. By May 2021, that population had dropped down to 41,442,615 (excluding Crimea and Sevastopol).

== History ==
In April 2008, the second Tymoshenko government decided to conduct the next census in 2011, and in 2009 to conduct a trial population census. In July 2010, the census was postponed to 2012, and the trial census to 2010.

In January 2012, Deputy Prime Minister of Social Policy Serhiy Tihipko stated that the second All-Ukrainian population census will be carried out in 2013, and in 2012 “a population census will be carried out only for a single region, which is typical for the social composition of Ukraine".

In September 2013, the second Azarov government set the census' date for 2016. In December 2015, the second Yatsenyuk government postponed it to 2020.

In October 2019, the State Statistics Service of Ukraine confirmed that the national census was planned to be held from 10 November to 23 December 2020. But in April 2020, Minister of the Cabinet of Ministers Oleh Nemchinov said there would be no census in 2020 and probably not in 2021, because it was "an expensive endeavour".

Nemchinov stated in December 2020 that the next census was planned for 2023.

Following the 2022 Russian invasion of Ukraine the census was postponed to an unknown date after the war.

== See also ==
- Censuses in Ukraine
- Demographics of Ukraine
