= 2001 Ukrainian census =

Population census in Ukraine (2001)

2001 Ukrainian Census
- 5 December 2001
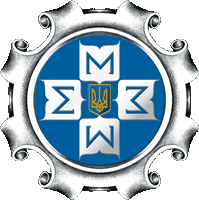
- Emblem of the State Statistics Service

- Logo of the census

General information
- Country: Ukraine
- Topics: Census topics: People and population; Urban and rural population; Gender; Age; Ethnicity and language; Education; Marital status
- Authority: State Statistics Service
- Website: 2001.ukrcensus.gov.ua

Results
- Total population: 48,457,100 (▼6.3%)
- Most populous region: Donetsk (4,841,100)
- Least populous region: Sevastopol (379,500)

The 2001 Ukrainian census (Ukrainian: Перепис населення України 2001 року, romanized: Perepys naselennya Ukrayiny 2001 roku) is to date the only census of the population of independent Ukraine. It was conducted by the State Statistics Committee of Ukraine on 5 December 2001, twelve years after the last Soviet Union census in 1989. The next Ukrainian census was planned to be held in 2011 but has been repeatedly postponed.

The total population recorded in 2001 was 48,457,100, of which the urban population was 32,574,500 (67.2%), rural: 15,882,600 (32.8%), male: 22,441,400 (46.3%), female: 26,015,700 (53.7%). The total permanent population recorded was 48,241,000.

== Settlements ==
There were 454 cities: Nine had a population over 500,000. The census recorded over 130 nationalities.

== Actual population by regions ==
Region	Population, 2001 (thousands)	Population, 1989 (thousands)	Change (percent)
Autonomous Republic of Crimea	2033.7	2063.6	99
Cherkasy Oblast	1402.9	1531.5	92
Chernihiv Oblast	1245.3	1415.9	88
Chernivtsi Oblast	922.8	938.0	98
Dnipropetrovsk Oblast	3567.6	3881.2	92
Donetsk Oblast	4841.1	5332.4	91
Ivano-Frankivsk Oblast	1409.8	1423.5	99
Kharkiv Oblast	2914.2	3195.0	91
Kherson Oblast	1175.1	1240.0	95
Khmelnytskyi Oblast	1430.8	1527.1	94
Kirovohrad Oblast	1133.1	1239.4	91
Kyiv Oblast	1827.9	1940.0	94
Luhansk Oblast	2546.2	2862.7	89
Lviv Oblast	2626.5	2747.7	94
Mykolaiv Oblast	1264.7	1330.6	95
Odesa Oblast	2469.0	2642.6	93
Poltava Oblast	1630.1	1753.0	93
Rivne Oblast	1173.3	1169.7	100
Sumy Oblast	1299.7	1432.7	91
Ternopil Oblast	1142.4	1168.9	98
Vinnytsia Oblast	1772.4	1932.6	92
Volyn Oblast	1060.7	1061.2	100
Zakarpattia Oblast	1258.3	1252.3	100
Zaporizhzhia Oblast	1929.2	2081.8	93
Zhytomyr Oblast	1389.5	1545.4	90
Kyiv (city)	2611.3	2602.8	100
Sevastopol (city)	379.5	395.0	96

Source: Total number of actual population. 2001 Ukrainian Population Census. State Statistics Committee of Ukraine

== Urban and rural population by regions ==
Region	Urban Population (thousands)	Rural Population (thousands)	Urban Population (percent)	Rural Population (percent)
Autonomous Republic of Crimea	1274.3	759.4	63	37
Cherkasy Oblast	753.6	649.3	54	46
Chernihiv Oblast	727.2	518.1	58	42
Chernivtsi Oblast	373.5	549.3	40	60
Dnipropetrovsk Oblast	2960.3	607.3	83	17
Donetsk Oblast	4363.6	477.5	90	10
Ivano-Frankivsk Oblast	593.0	816.8	42	58
Kharkiv Oblast	2288.7	625.5	79	21
Kherson Oblast	706.2	468.9	60	40
Khmelnytskyi Oblast	729.6	701.2	51	49
Kirovohrad Oblast	682.0	451.1	60	40
Kyiv Oblast	1053.5	774.4	58	42
Luhansk Oblast	2190.8	355.4	86	14
Lviv Oblast	1558.7	1067.8	59	41
Mykolaiv Oblast	838.8	425.9	66	34
Odesa Oblast	1624.6	844.4	66	34
Poltava Oblast	956.8	673.3	59	41
Rivne Oblast	549.7	623.6	47	53
Sumy Oblast	842.9	456.8	65	35
Ternopil Oblast	485.6	656.8	43	57
Vinnytsia Oblast	818.9	953.5	46	54
Volyn Oblast	533.2	527.5	50	50
Zakarpattia Oblast	466.0	792.3	37	63
Zaporizhzhia Oblast	1458.2	471.0	76	24
Zhytomyr Oblast	775.4	614.1	56	44
Kyiv (city)	2611.3	-	100	-
Sevastopol (city)	358.1	21.4	94	6

Source: Urban and rural population. 2001 Ukrainian Population Census. State Statistics Committee of Ukraine'

== Gender structure by regions ==
Region	Male (thousands)	Female (thousands)	Male (percent)	Female (percent)
Autonomous Republic of Crimea	937.6	1096.1	46	54
Cherkasy Oblast	638.8	764.2	46	54
Chernihiv Oblast	565.5	679.7	45	55
Chernivtsi Oblast	432.1	490.7	47	53
Dnipropetrovsk Oblast	1643.3	1924.3	46	54
Donetsk Oblast	2219.9	2621.2	46	54
Ivano-Frankivsk Oblast	665.2	744.5	47	53
Kharkiv Oblast	1339.5	1574.7	46	54
Kherson Oblast	548.5	626.6	47	53
Khmelnytskyi Oblast	659.9	770.8	46	54
Kirovohrad Oblast	520.8	612.2	46	54
Kyiv Oblast	845.9	982.0	46	54
Luhansk Oblast	1169.9	1376.3	46	54
Lviv Oblast	1245.1	1381.4	47	53
Mykolaiv Oblast	588.2	676.6	47	53
Odesa Oblast	1155.4	1313.6	47	53
Poltava Oblast	747.4	882.7	46	54
Rivne Oblast	555.6	617.7	47	53
Sumy Oblast	593.8	705.9	46	54
Ternopil Oblast	530.2	612.3	46	54
Vinnytsia Oblast	809.6	962.8	46	54
Volyn Oblast	500.1	560.6	47	53
Zakarpattia Oblast	605.5	652.8	48	52
Zaporizhzhia Oblast	886.6	1042.6	46	54
Zhytomyr Oblast	644.8	744.7	46	54
Kyiv (city)	1218.7	1392.7	47	53
Sevastopol (city)	173.5	206.0	46	54

Source: Gender structure of the population. 2001 Ukrainian Population Census. State Statistics Committee of Ukraine'

== National structure ==
Region	Population, 2001 (thousands)	Population, 2001 (percent)	Population, 1989 (percent)	Change (percent)
Ukrainians	37541.7	77.8	72.7	100.3
Russians	8334.1	17.3	22.1	73.4
Belarusians	275.8	0.6	0.9	62.7
Moldovans (Note: It is a matter of controversy whether Moldovans are the same as Romanians or a distinct ethnic group.)	258.6	0.5	0.6	79.7
Crimean Tatars	248.2	0.5	0	530.0
Bulgarians	204.6	0.4	0.5	87.5
Hungarians	156.6	0.3	0.4	96.0
Romanians	151.0	0.3	0.3	112.0
Poles	144.1	0.3	0.4	65.8
Jews	103.6	0.2	0.9	21.3
Armenians	99.9	0.2	0.1	180.0
Greeks	91.5	0.2	0.2	92.9
Tatars	73.3	0.2	0.2	84.4
Gypsies	47.6	0.1	0.1	99.3
Azerbaijanians	45.2	0.1	0	122.2
Georgians	34.2	0.1	0	145.3
Germans	33.3	0.1	0.1	88.0
Gagauz	31.9	0.1	0.1	99.9
Other	177.1	0.4	0.4	83.9

Source: National composition of the population. 2001 Ukrainian Population Census. State Statistics Committee of Ukraine'

=== National structure by regions ===
Note: listed are those nationalities which comprise more than 0.1% of regional population. Numbers are given in thousands.

- Autonomous Republic of Crimea - 2,024.0 (100%)
  - Russians - 1,180.4 (58.5%)
  - Ukrainians - 492.2 (24.4%)
  - Crimean Tatars - 243.4 (12.1%)
  - Belarusians - 29.2 (1.5%)
  - Tatars - 11.0 (0.5%)
  - Armenians - 8.7 (0.4%)
  - Jews - 4.5 (0.2%)
  - Poles - 3.8 (0.2%)
  - Moldovans - 3.7 (0.2%)
  - Azeris - 3.7 (0.2%)
  - Uzbeks - 2.9 (0.1%)
  - Koreans - 2.9 (0.1%)
  - Greeks - 2.8 (0.1%)
  - Germans - 2.5 (0.1%)
  - Mordvins - 2.2 (0.1%)
  - Chuvashi - 2.1 (0.1%)
- Cherkasy Oblast - 1,398.3 (100%)
  - Ukrainians - 1,301.2 (93.1%)
  - Russians - 75.6 (5.4%)
  - Belarusians - 3.9 (0.3%)
  - Armenians - 1.7 (0.1%)
  - Moldovans - 1.6 (0.1%)
  - Jews - 1.5 (0.1%)
- Chernihiv Oblast - 1,236.1 (100%)
  - Ukrainians - 1,155.4 (93.5%)
  - Russians - 62.2 (5.0%)
  - Belarusians - 7.1 (0.6%)
- Chernivtsi Oblast - 919.0 (100%)
  - Ukrainians - 689.1 (75.0%)
  - Romanians - 114.6 (12.5%)
  - Moldovans - 67.2 (7.3%)
  - Russians - 37.9 (4.1%)
  - Poles - 3.4 (0.4%)
  - Belarusians - 1.5 (0.2%)
  - Jews - 1.4 (0.2%)
- Dnipropetrovsk Oblast - 3,561.2 (100%)
  - Ukrainians - 2,825.8 (79.3%)
  - Russians - 627.5 (17.6%)
  - Belarusians - 29.5 (0.8%)
  - Jews - 13.7 (0.4%)
  - Armenians - 10.6 (0.3%)
  - Azeris - 5.6 (0.2%)
- Donetsk Oblast - 4,825.6 (100%)
  - Ukrainians - 2,744.1 (56.9%)
  - Russians - 1,844.4 (38.2%)
  - Greeks - 77.5 (1.6%)
  - Belarusians - 44.5 (0.9%)
  - Tatars - 19.2 (0.4%)
  - Armenians - 15.7 (0.3%)
  - Jews - 8.8 (0.2%)
  - Azeris - 8.1 (0.2%)
  - Georgians - 7.2 (0.2%)
  - Moldovans - 7.2 (0.2%)
- Ivano-Frankivsk Oblast - 1,406.1 (100%)
  - Ukrainians - 1,371.2 (97.5%)
  - Russians - 24.9 (1.8%)
  - Poles - 1.9 (0.2%)
  - Belarusians - 1.5 (0.2%)
- Kharkiv Oblast - 2,895.8 (100%)
  - Ukrainians - 2,048.7 (70.7%)
  - Russians - 742.0 (25.6%)
  - Belarusians - 14.7 (0.5%)
  - Jews - 11.5 (0.4%)
  - Armenians - 11.1 (0.4%)
- Kherson Oblast - 1,172.7 (100%)
  - Ukrainians - 961.6 (82.0%)
  - Russians - 165.2 (14.1%)
  - Belarusians - 8.1 (0.7%)
  - Tatars - 5.3 (0.5%)
  - Armenians - 4.5 (0.4%)
  - Moldovans - 4.1 (0.4%)
- Khmelnytskyi Oblast - 1,426.6 (100%)
  - Ukrainians - 1,339.3 (93.9%)
  - Russians - 50.7 (3.6%)
  - Poles - 23.0 (1.6%)
- Kirovohrad Oblast - 1,125.7 (100%)
  - Ukrainians - 1,014.6 (90.1%)
  - Russians - 83.9 (7.5%)
  - Moldovans - 8.2 (0.7%)
  - Belarusians - 5.5 (0.5%)
  - Armenians - 2.9 (0.3%)
- Kyiv Oblast - 1,821.1 (100%)
  - Ukrainians - 1,684.8 (92.5%)
  - Russians - 109.3 (6.0%)
  - Belarusians - 8.6 (0.5%)
- Luhansk Oblast - 2,540.2 (100%)
  - Ukrainians - 1,472.4 (58.0%)
  - Russians - 991.8 (39.0%)
  - Belarusians - 20.5 (0.8%)
  - Tatars - 8.5 (0.3%)
  - Armenians - 6.5 (0.3%)
- Lviv Oblast - 2,606.0 (100%)
  - Ukrainians - 2,471.0 (94.8%)
  - Russians - 92.6 (3.6%)
  - Poles - 18.9 (0.7%)
- Mykolaiv Oblast - 1,262.9 (100%)
  - Ukrainians - 1,034.5 (81.9%)
  - Russians - 177.5 (14.1%)
  - Moldovans - 13.1 (1.0%)
  - Belarusians - 8.3 (0.7%)
  - Bulgarians - 5.6 (0.4%)
  - Armenians - 4.2 (0.3%)
  - Jews - 3.2 (0.3%)
- Odesa Oblast - 2,455.7 (100%)
  - Ukrainians - 1,542.3 (62.8%)
  - Russians - 508.5 (20.7%)
  - Bulgarians - 150.6 (6.1%)
  - Moldovans - 123.7 (5.0%)
  - Gagauz - 27.6 (1.1%)
  - Jews - 13.3 (0.5%)
  - Belarusians - 12.7 (0.5%)
  - Armenians - 7.4 (0.3%)
- Poltava Oblast - 1,621.2 (100%)
  - Ukrainians - 1,481.1 (91.4%)
  - Russians - 117.1 (7.2%)
  - Belarusians - 6.3 (0.4%)
- Rivne Oblast - 1,171.4 (100%)
  - Ukrainians - 1,123.4 (95.9%)
  - Russians - 30.1 (2.6%)
  - Belarusians - 11.8 (1.0%)
- Sumy Oblast - 1,296.8 (100%)
  - Ukrainians - 1,152.0 (88.8%)
  - Russians - 121.7 (9.4%)
  - Belarusians - 4.3 (0.3%)
- Ternopil Oblast - 1,138.5 (100%)
  - Ukrainians - 1,113.5 (97.8%)
  - Russians - 14.2 (1.2%)
  - Poles - 3.8 (0.3%)
- Vinnytsia Oblast - 1,763.9 (100%)
  - Ukrainians - 1,674.1 (94.9%)
  - Russians - 67.5 (3.8%)
- Volyn Oblast - 1,057.2 (100%)
  - Ukrainians - 1,025.0 (96.9%)
  - Russians - 25.1 (2.4%)
  - Belarusians - 3.2 (0.3%)
- Zakarpattia Oblast - 1,254.6 (100%)
  - Ukrainians - 1,010.1 (80.5%)
  - Hungarians - 151.5 (12.1%)
  - Romanians - 32.1 (2.6%)
  - Russians - 31.0 (2.5%)
  - Gypsies - 14.0 (1.1%)
  - Slovaks - 5.6 (0.5%)
  - Germans - 3.5 (0.3%)
- Zaporizhzhia Oblast - 1,926.8 (100%)
  - Ukrainians - 1,364.1 (70.8%)
  - Russians - 476.8 (24.7%)
  - Bulgarians - 27.7 (1.4%)
  - Belarusians - 12.6 (0.7%)
  - Armenians - 6.4 (0.3%)
  - Tatars - 5.1 (0.3%)
- Zhytomyr Oblast - 1,389.3 (100%)
  - Ukrainians - 1,255.0 (90.3%)
  - Russians - 68.9 (5.0%)
  - Poles - 49.0 (3.5%)
  - Belarusians - 4.9 (0.4%)
- Kyiv - 2,567.0 (100%)
  - Ukrainians - 2,110.8 (82.2%)
  - Russians - 337.3 (13.1%)
  - Jews - 17.9 (0.7%)
  - Belarusians - 16.5 (0.6%)
  - Poles - 6.9 (0.3%)
- Sevastopol - 377.2 (100%)
  - Russians - 270.0 (71.6%)
  - Ukrainians - 84.4 (22.4%)
  - Belarusians - 5.8 (1.6%)
  - Tatars - 2.5 (0.7%)
  - Crimean Tatars - 1.8 (0.5%)
  - Armenians - 1.3 (0.3%)
  - Jews - 1.0 (0.3%)

Source: National composition of the population. 2001 Ukrainian Population Census. State Statistics Committee of Ukraine'

== Languages ==
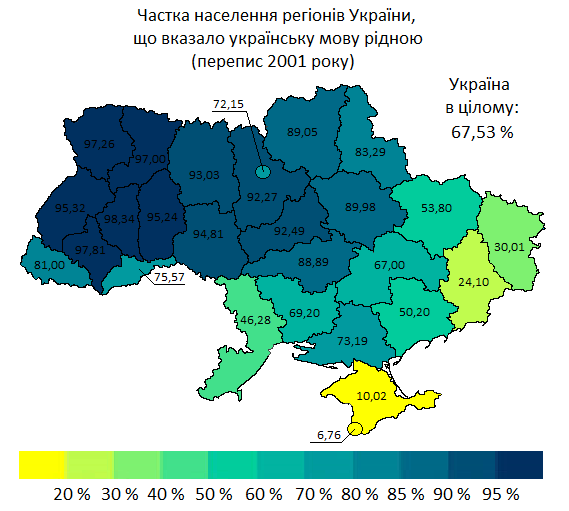
Percentage of the population of Ukraine's regions who indicated Ukrainian as their native language.

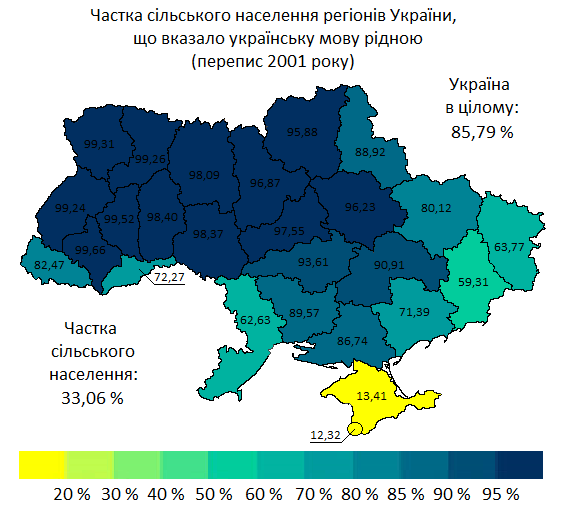
Percentage of the rural population of Ukraine's regions who indicated Ukrainian as their native language.

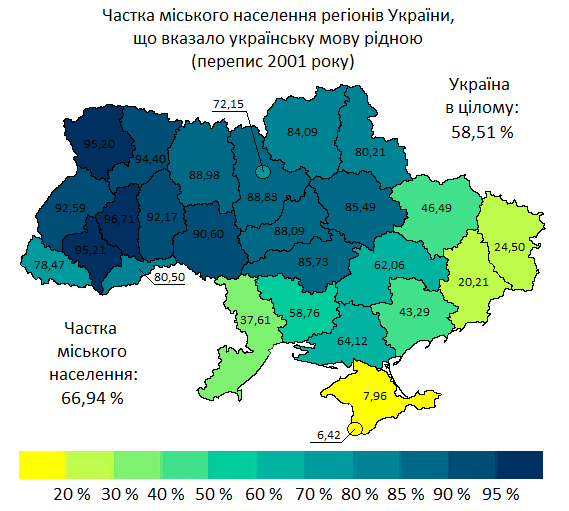
Percentage of the urban population of Ukraine's regions who indicated Ukrainian as their native language.

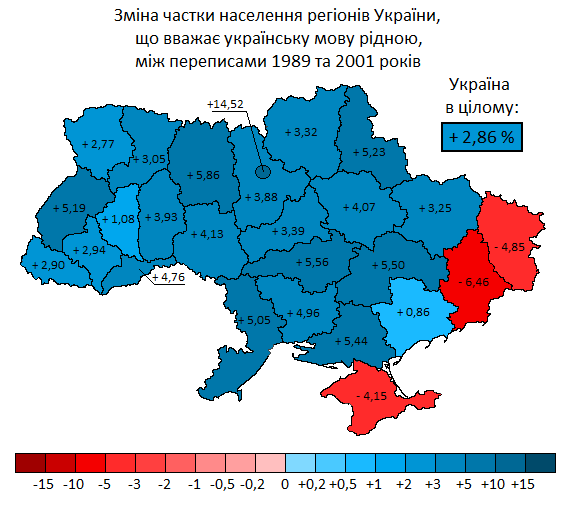
Change in the proportion of the population of Ukraine's regions who consider Ukrainian their native language between the 1989 and 2001 censuses.

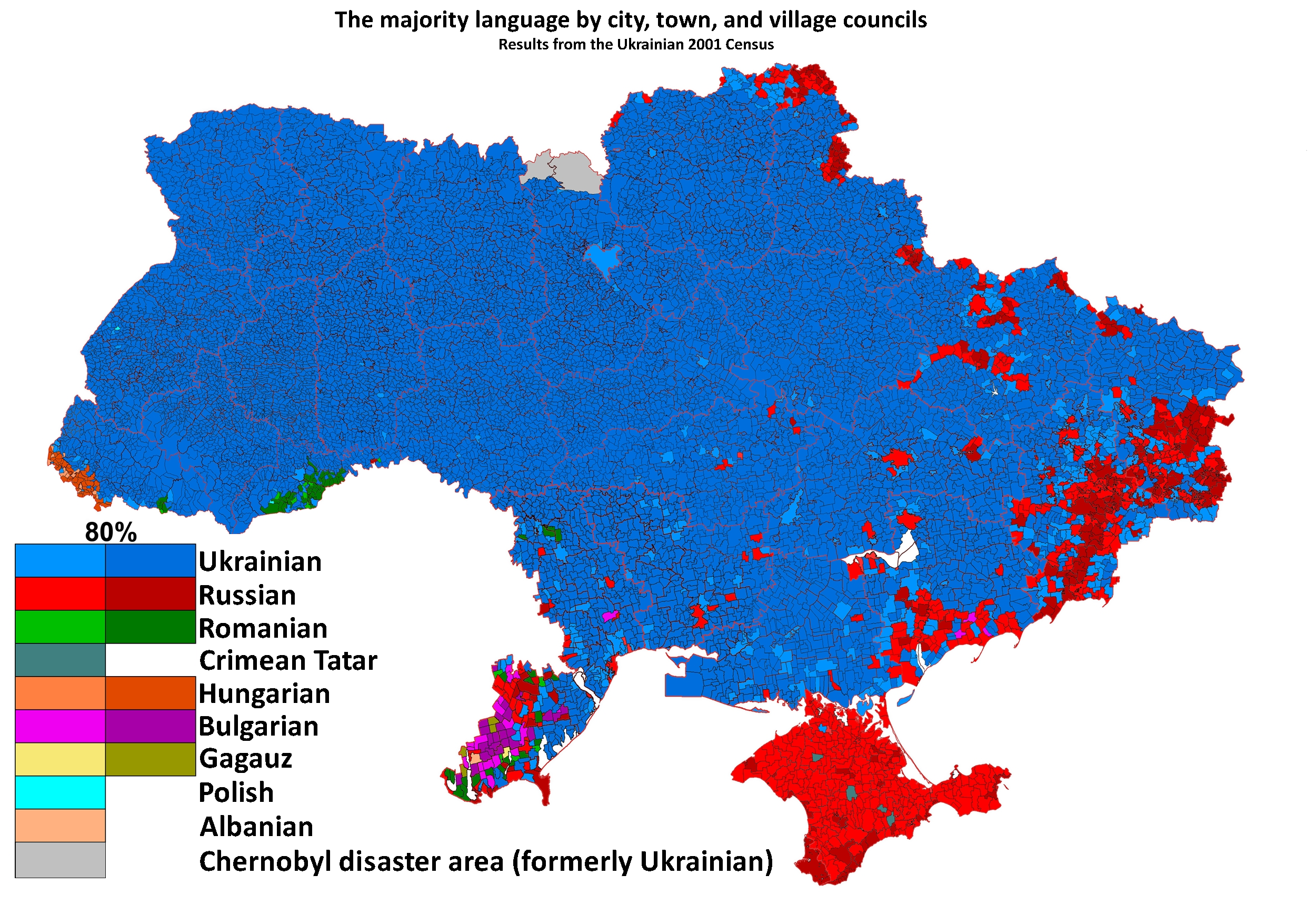
The most common native language in Ukraine's city, settlement, and village councils.

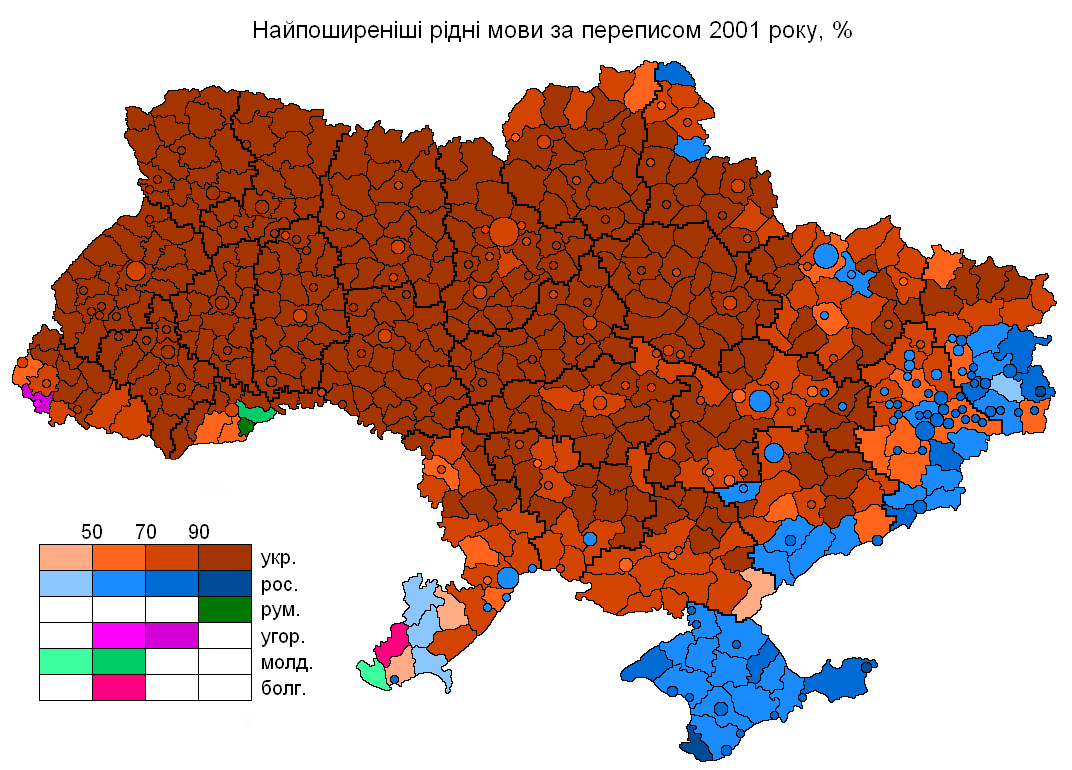
The most common native language in Ukraine's raions and cities of oblast significance.

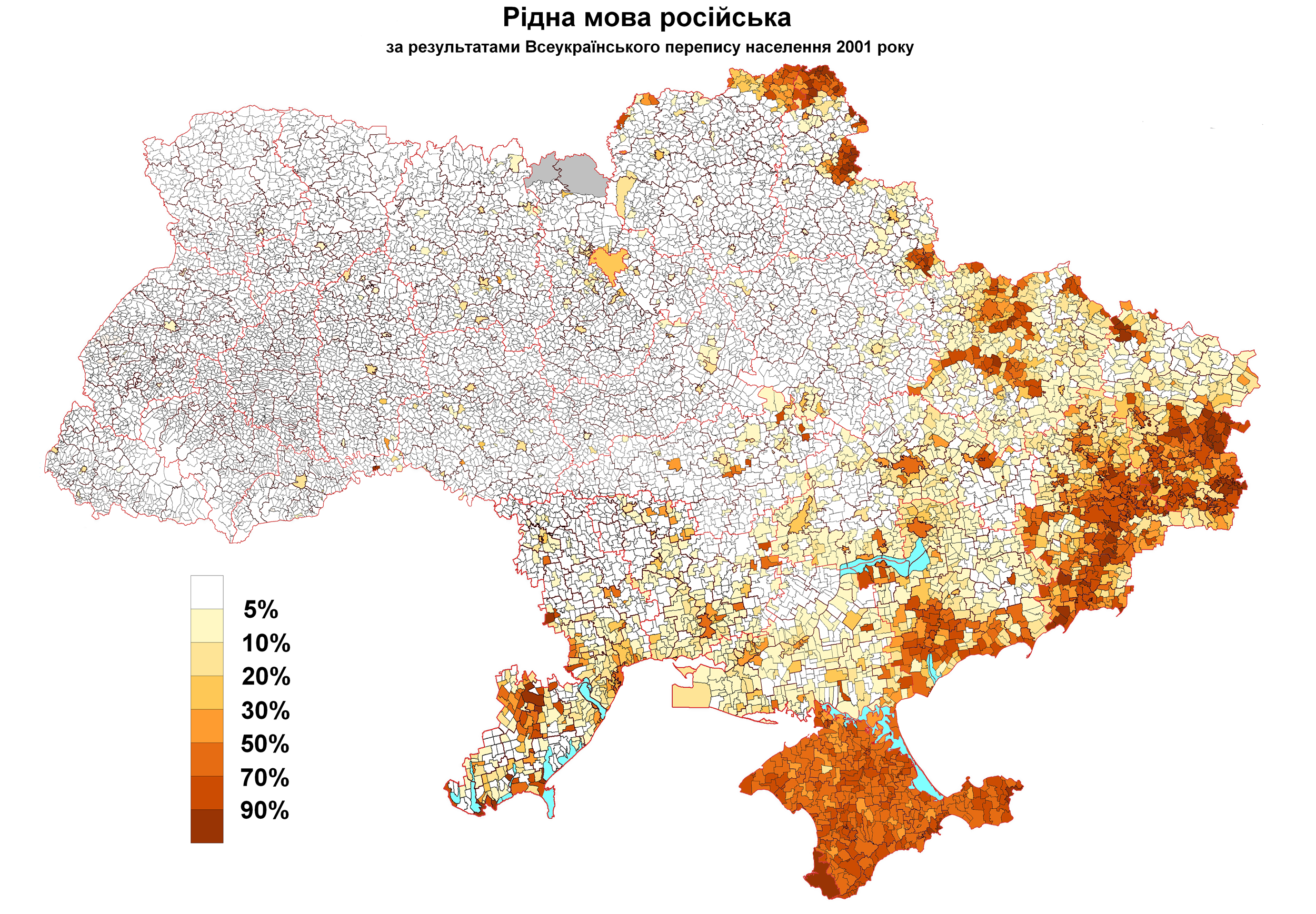
Percentage of population whose native language is Russian.

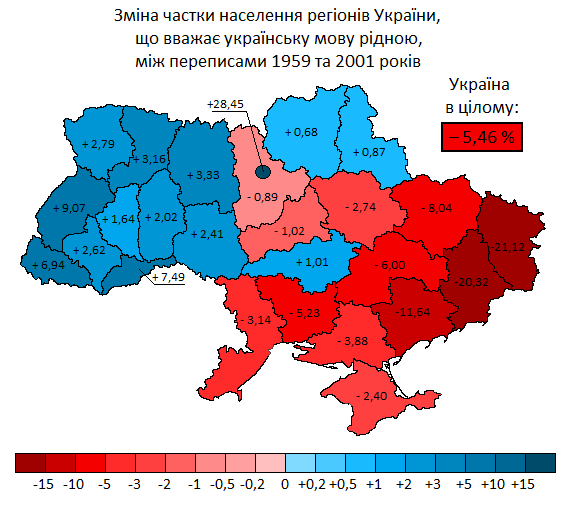
Change in the proportion of the population of Ukraine's regions who consider Ukrainian their native language between the 1959 and 2001 censuses.
