= 1989 Soviet census =

Last census to take place in the USSR

1989 All-Union Population Census
- January 12, 1989– January 19, 1989
- Soviet State Emblem

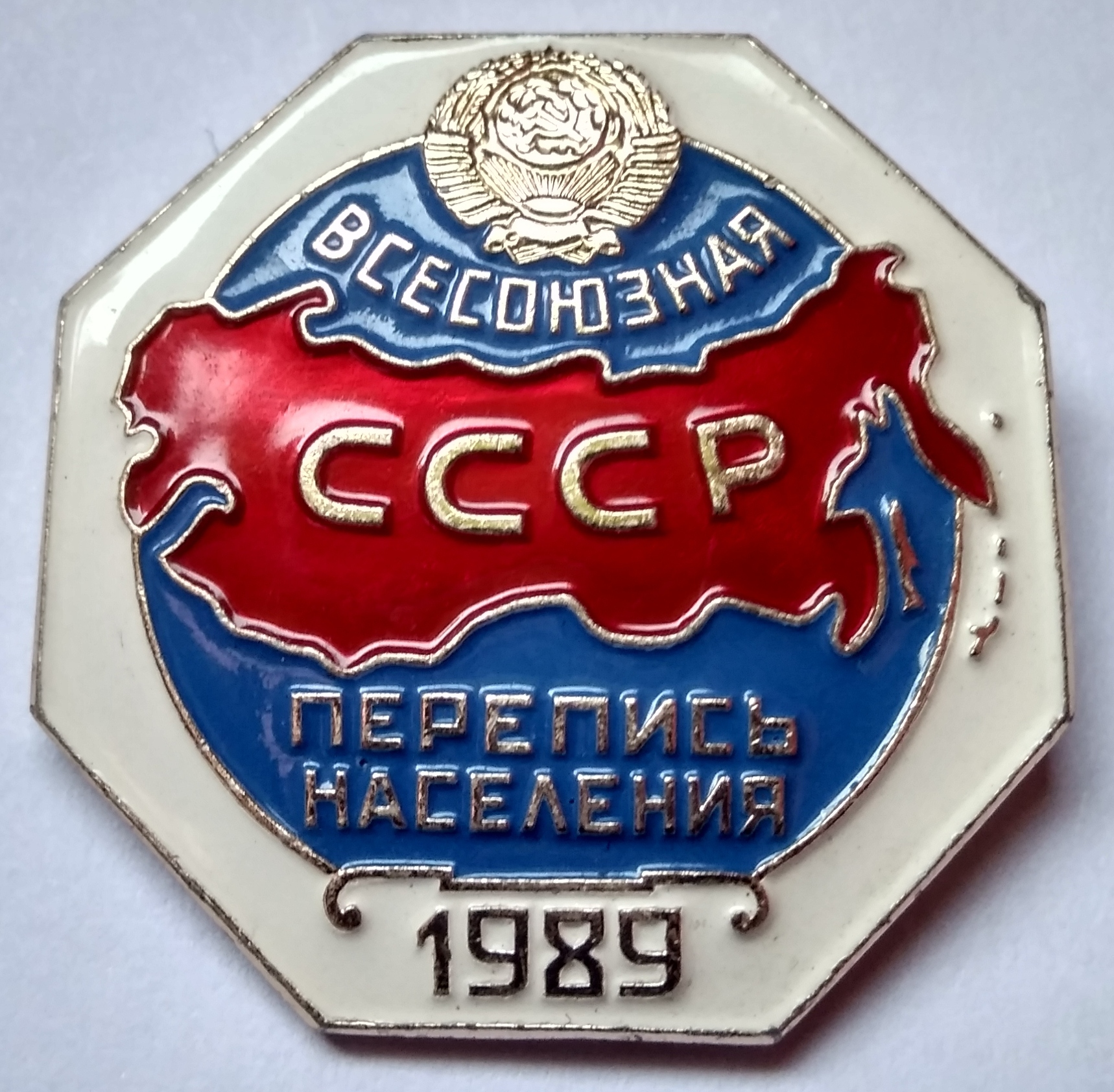
- Census Logo

General information
- Country: Soviet Union

Results
- Total population: 286,730,819 (▲9.3%)
- Most populous republic: Russian SFSR; 147,400,537
- Least populous republic: Estonian SSR; 1,572,916

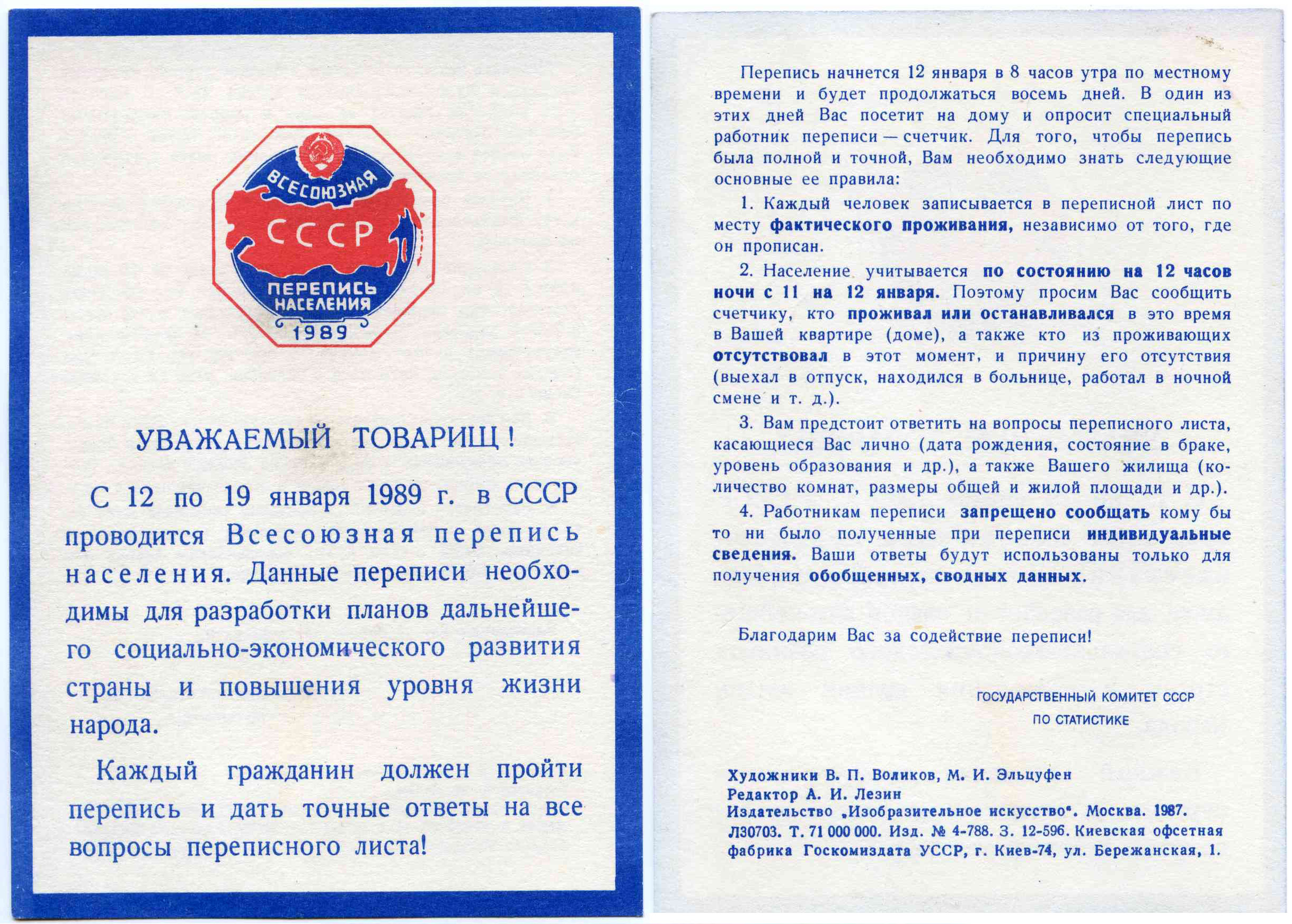
1989 Soviet census information pamphlet

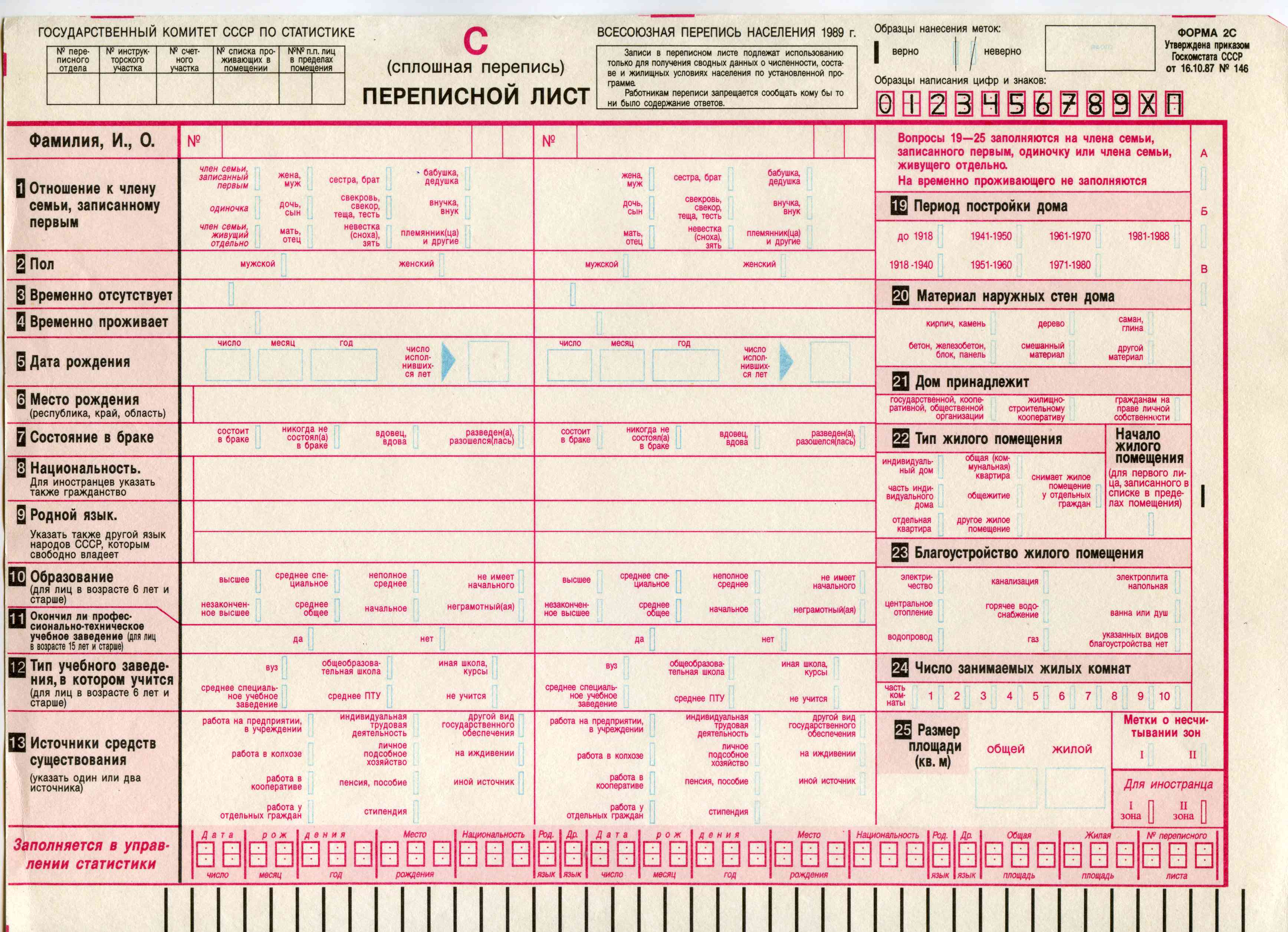
1989 census form

The 1989 Soviet census (Russian: Всесоюзная перепись населения 1989, lit. '1989 All-Union Census'), conducted between 12 and 19 January of that year, was the final census carried out in the Soviet Union. The census found the total population to be 286,730,819 inhabitants. In 1989, the Soviet Union ranked as the third most populous country in the world, above the United States (with 248,709,873 inhabitants according to the 1990 census), although it was well below China and India.

== Statistics ==
In 1989, about half of the Soviet Union's total population lived in the Russian SFSR, and approximately one-sixth (18%) of them in the Ukrainian SSR. Almost two-thirds (65.7%) of the population was urban, leaving the rural population with 34.3%. In this way, its gradual increase continued, as shown by the series represented by 47.9%, 56.3% and 62.3% of 1959, 1970 and 1979, respectively.

The last two national censuses (held in 1979 and 1989) showed that the country had been experiencing an average annual increase of about 2.5 million people, although it was a slight decrease from a figure of around 3 million per year in the previous intercensal period, 1959–1970. This post-war increase had contributed to the USSR's partial demographic recovery from the significant population loss that the USSR had suffered during the Great Patriotic War (the Eastern Front of World War II), and before it, during Stalin's Great Purge of 1936–1938. The previous postwar censuses, conducted in 1959, 1970 and 1979, had enumerated 208,826,650, 241,720,134, and 262,436,227 inhabitants, respectively.

In 1990, the Soviet Union was more populated than both the United States and Canada together, having some 40 million more inhabitants than the U.S. alone. However, after the dissolution of the Soviet Union in late 1991, the combined population of the 15 former Soviet republics stagnated at around 290 million inhabitants for the period 1995–2000.

This significant slowdown may in part be due to the remarkable socio-economic changes that followed the dissolution, that have tended to reduce even more the already decreasing birth rates (which were already showing some signs of decline since the Soviet era, in particular among the people living in the European part of the Soviet Union, beginning from 1988 to 1989).

Today the population of the 15 former Soviet republics is around 299 million, with much of this growth attributed to the Central Asian states, which have increasing fertility, and in a smaller part Azerbaijan and Russia. Estonia, Belarus, Armenia and Georgia have also recorded some positive growth in the recent years. Ukraine, Moldova, Latvia and Lithuania are in continuous decline in population since early 1990s, although Ukraine's decline seemed to stabilise in early 2010s, before the Russo-Ukrainian war. Since 2019 Lithuania seems to appear some first signs of stabilisation around 2.8 million.

Largest cities of the USSR according to the 1989 census.

=== Ukrainian SSR ===
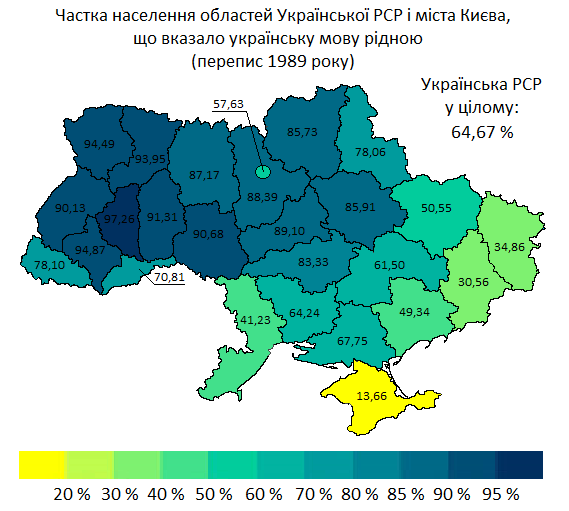
Percentage of the population of the oblasts of the Ukrainian SSR and the city of Kyiv who indicated Ukrainian as their native language.

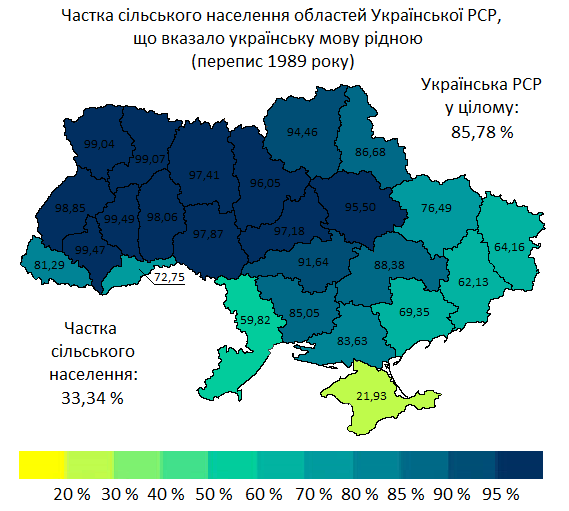
Percentage of the rural population of the oblasts of the Ukrainian SSR who indicated Ukrainian as their native language.

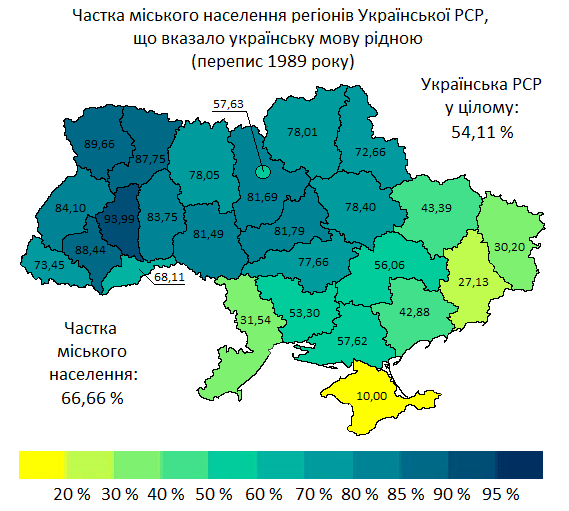
Percentage of the urban population of the regions of the Ukrainian SSR who indicated Ukrainian as their native language.

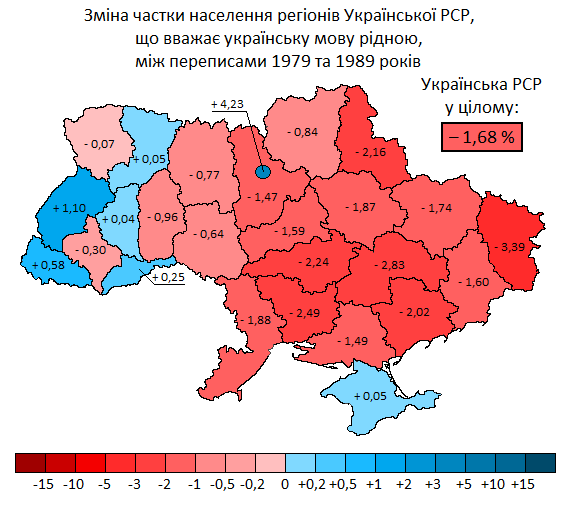
Change in the proportion of the population of the regions of the Ukrainian SSR who consider Ukrainian their native language between the 1979 and 1989 censuses.

== Ranking of Soviet republics ==
Rank	Soviet Republic	Population as of 1979 Census	Population as of 1989 Census	Change	Percent change
1	Russia	137,551,000	147,400,537	9,849,537 ▲	7.2% ▲
2	Ukraine	49,755,000	51,706,742	1,951,742 ▲	3.9% ▲
3	Uzbekistan	15,391,000	19,905,158	4,514,158 ▲	29.3% ▲
4	Kazakhstan	14,684,000	16,536,511	1,852,511 ▲	12.6% ▲
5	Byelorussia	9,560,000	10,199,709	639,709 ▲	6.7% ▲
6	Azerbaijan	6,028,000	7,037,867	1,009,867 ▲	16.8% ▲
7	Georgia	5,015,000	5,443,359	428,359 ▲	8.5% ▲
8	Tajikistan	3,801,000	5,108,576	1,307,576 ▲	34.4% ▲
9	Moldavia	3,947,000	4,337,592	390,592 ▲	9.9% ▲
10	Kyrgyzstan	3,529,000	4,290,442	761,442 ▲	21.6% ▲
11	Lithuania	3,398,000	3,689,779	291,779 ▲	8.6% ▲
12	Turkmenistan	2,759,000	3,533,925	774,925 ▲	28.1% ▲
13	Armenia	3,031,000	3,287,677	256,677 ▲	8.5% ▲
14	Latvia	2,521,000	2,680,029	159,029 ▲	6.3% ▲
15	Estonia	1,466,000	1,572,916	106,916 ▲	7.3% ▲
	Soviet Union	262,436,000	286,730,819	24,294,819	9.3%

== Ethnicities of the Soviet Union ==
Rank	Ethnicity	Population as of 1989 Census	Percentage
-	Total population	285,742,511	100%
1	Russians	145,155,489	50.8%
2	Ukrainians	44,186,006	15.5%
3	Uzbeks	16,697,825	5.8%
4	Belarusians	10,036,251	3.5%
5	Kazakhs	8,135,818	2.8%
6	Azerbaijanis	6,770,403	2.4%
7	Tatars	6,648,760	2.3%
8	Armenians	4,623,232	1.6%
9	Tajiks	4,215,372	1.5%
10	Georgians	3,981,045	1.4%
-	Others	35,292,310	12.4%

== See also ==
- Demographics of the Soviet Union
- Republics of the Soviet Union
- Soviet Census (1926)
- Soviet Census (1937)
- Soviet Census (1959)
- Soviet Census (1970)
- Soviet Census (1979)
- Soviet Union
