= State Statistics Service of Ukraine =

Ukrainian government agency responsible for collection and dissemination of statistics

- Державна служба статистики України
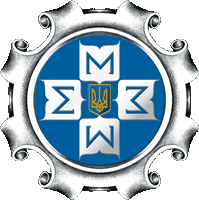
- Emblem of the State Statistics Service of Ukraine

Agency overview
- Formed: 1920
- Preceding agencies: State Statistics Committee of Ukraine (1997–2010); Ministry of Statistics of Ukraine (1991–1997)
- Jurisdiction: Ukraine
- Headquarters: 3 Shota Rustaveli Vulytsia, Kyiv, 01601
- Annual budget: UAH 1,68 bn (2024)
- Agency executives: Arsen Makarchuk, Chair; Artem Rudko, CDTO; Viktor Polishchuk, Deputy Chair
- Website: stat.gov.ua

The State Statistics Service of Ukraine (Ukrainian: Державна служба статистики України, romanized: Derzhavna Sluzhba Statystyky Ukrainy) is the Ukrainian government agency responsible for collection and dissemination of statistics in Ukraine. For brevity, it is also referred to as Derzhstat or Ukrstat. In 2010, the agency was reorganised from the State Statistics Committee of Ukraine and formed in 2010, following a national administrative reform.

== International cooperation ==
The State Statistics Service actively cooperates with international organisations to ensure compliance of Ukrainian statistics with world standards. In particular, it participates in Eurostat programs aimed at harmonising statistical data within Ukraine's European integration framework. The State Statistics Service is also a member of the UN Statistical Committee and cooperates with other international institutions, such as the World Bank and the International Monetary Fund.

In the context of Ukraine's European integration to the EU, the State Statistics Service of Ukraine is vital in ensuring harmonisation of the Ukrainian legislation with the EU. Its representatives are involved in the work under Cluster 1, Fundamentals, which is key to the negotiation process. They are included in each negotiation group, considering the importance of statistics for effective integration.

== Institutions ==
- Science and Research Institute of Statistics, keeps track of the Classification of objects of the administrative-territorial system of Ukraine

== See also ==
- Ukrainian Census (2001)
- Censuses in Ukraine
