= 1939 Soviet census =

1939 Census in the Soviet Union

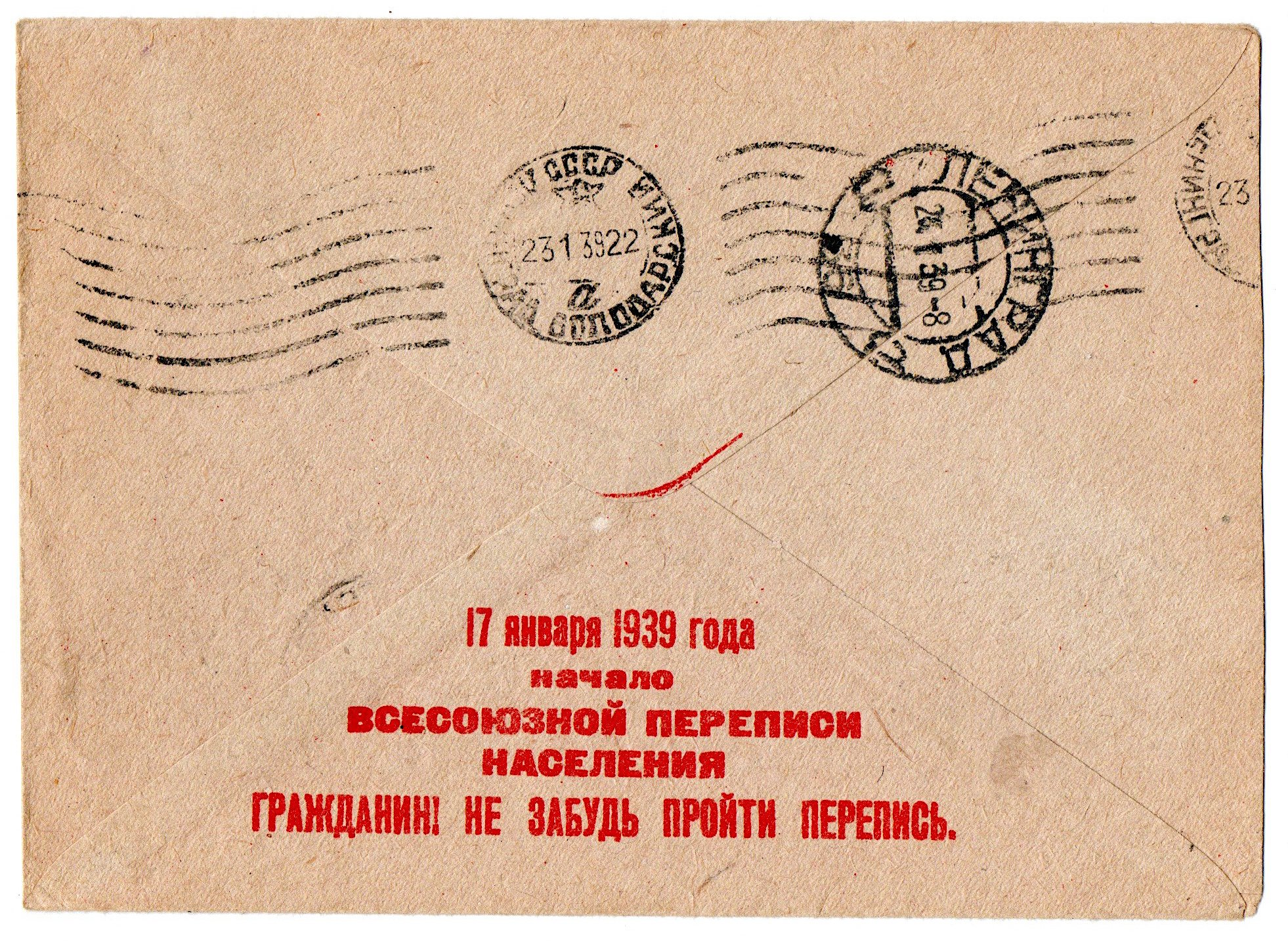
USSR reverse of a January 23rd, 1939 registered cover sent in Leningrad. The text translates as: '17 January 1939, start of the All-Union Census. Citizen! Do not forget to go through the census.'

The 1939 Soviet census (Russian: Всесоюзная перепись населения 1939, romanized: Vsesoyuznaya perepis naseleniya 1939, lit. '1939 All-Union Census'), conducted from January 17 to January 26, succeeded the 1937 Soviet census that was declared invalid. It happened only two years after the previous census, due to the failure of the preceding one. Results of 1939 census are considered unreliable, due to accidental counting issues and also intentional falsification to achieve political goals of the Joseph Stalin's regime.

== Preparation ==
The 1939 Soviet census took place after the postponement of the 1930 census to first 1935 and then 1937, followed by the failure of that census. In preparation for the 1939 census, a number of decisions were made to avoid ending with the same fate as the census of 1937. Due to the previous census showing believers in religion to form a majority among the population, the question on religion was dropped from the census entirely, and the occupation of priest was changed to "servitor of a cult" in the census forms. Additionally, as many of the people in charge of organizing the previous census had been removed from their positions, Vladimir Starovsky and Vyacheslav Molotov were put in charge of managing it.

== Census ==
The census-taking started on January 17, ending on January 23 in urban areas and January 26 in rural areas. Its form contained 16 questions and was printed in 22 languages, as well as providing, for the first and only time, a way to count both convicted criminals and political detainees. While follow-up checks and several other new tabulation methods were instituted, forms were not issued to keep track of double counting. A total of 400,000 census takers were sent to facilitate the process over the country. There were some reports of various religious communities resisting the census, which were dealt with by use of legal means.

== Aftermath ==
Within four months of it being taken, the preliminary census results were released. For unknown reasons, the full results were never made public. While initially the census was viewed inside the USSR as a "model census", it later became clear by the 1980s to the West that large-scale manipulation of the census results had taken place. Accidental over-counting and under-counting were issues, along with falsification with the goal of obscuring population loss and meeting Stalin's stated goal of the population reaching 170 million. That claim of 170 million is estimated to have been inflated by around 3 million, or 1.8%. Analysis of the results from the Kazakh SSR showed that distortions of the ethnic Kazakh population took place in an attempt to conceal population losses from the Kazakh famines of the 1920s and 30s. Historians have claimed that all the issues with fudged numbers and mistakes discredit the census as a reliable source. The Soviet leadership eventually learned from the mistakes made, and Vladimir Starovsky, head of the Central Statistical Directorate, corrected the points that led to accidental miscounts in the 1939 and 1937 censuses for the census of 1959, leading to a reliable count being taken.

== Results ==
According to the official results, the total population of the USSR was found to be at 170,467,186. Compared with 1926 figures, the urban population more than doubled, from 26.3 million to 55.9 million, while the literacy rate rose from 51.1% to 81.2% in the same time frame. Such a rapid rate of urbanization was historically unprecedented at the time.

The five largest nationalities in the USSR were found to be Russians, Ukrainians, Belarusians, Uzbeks, and Tatars.
