= 1919 Kiev city census =

1919 city-census of Kiev, Ukraine

- 1919

General information
- Region: Kiev, Ukrainian Soviet Socialist Republic
- Authority: Kiev Provincial Statistical Bureau

Results
- Total population: 544,368
- Most populous city district: Lvivska
- Least populous city district: Pushcha-Vodytsia

The 1919 Kiev city census (Ukrainian: Перепис населення м. Київа 1919 р., romanized: Perepys naselennia m. Kyiva 1919 r.; Russian: Перепись населения г. Киева 1919 г., romanized: Perepis' naseleniya g. Kieva 1919 g.) was the first census conducted in the city of Kiev following the Bolshevik occupation of the city in February 1919, taking place on March 16, 1919. The census covered the size, age, ethnic demography, and educational status of the city's population. The final report was published by D.l. Volion, head of the Kiev Provincial Statistical Bureau, in 1920.

== Census-taking process ==
As the Ukrainian Soviet Socialist Republic was officially established on 10 March 1919, 6 days prior to the taking of the census, the authority responsible for carrying it out, the Kiev Provincial Statistical Bureau, was under its administration. The main statisticians assigned to the carrying out and processing of the census were I. S. Bisk and V. S. Dvynianinov, who had also previously worked on the Kiev city census of 1917 during the rule of the Ukrainian People's Republic. There were some procedural issues with the registration of nationality, due to city-census enumerators being allowed to refuse to register people as Ukrainian. Despite this, the census showed an increase in the number of self-declared Ukrainians in Kiev from the 1917 census, as well as a decline in the number of self-declared Russians.

== Results ==
=== Population size ===
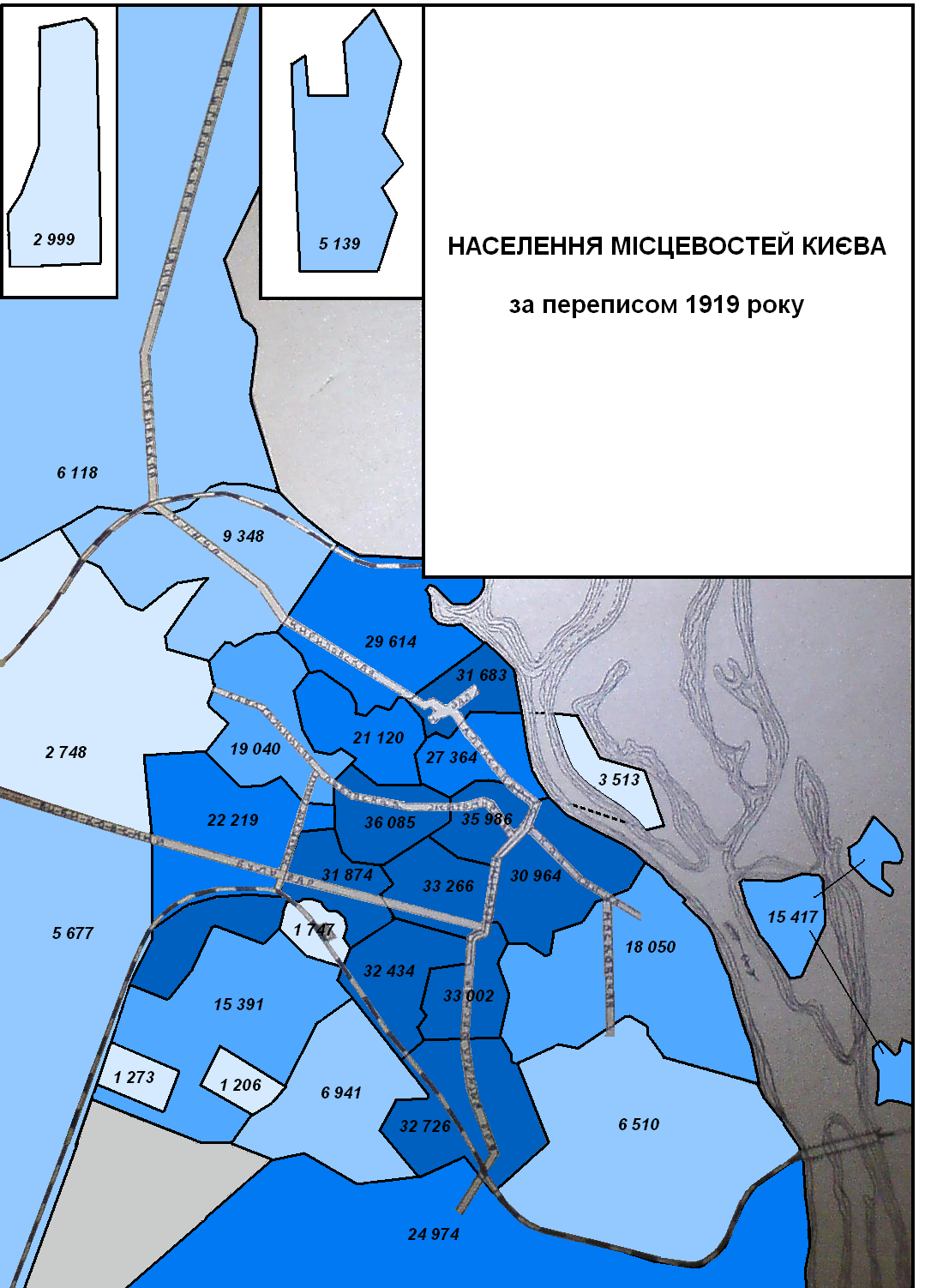
Population by district of Kiev according to the 1919 census

The total population of the city of Kiev in 1919 was found to be made up of 544,368 people. The chart below lists the population of each district of the city.

District	Population
Lvivska	36,085
Starokyivska	35,986
Fundukliivska	33,266
Troitska	33,002
Okraino-Lybidska	32,726
Tarasivska	32,434
Halytska	31,874
Podilska	31,683
Dvortsova	30,964
Hostyno-Dvirna	30,877
Ploska	29,614
Solomianska	26,558
Demiivka	24,974
Shuliavka	22,219
Hlybochytsia	21,120
Lukianivska	19,040
Pechersk	18,050
Kurenivka-Priorka	15,466
Slobidky	15,417
Syrets-Dachna	8,365
Zvirynets	6,510
Sviatoshyno	5,139
Pushcha-Vodytsia	2,999

=== National composition ===
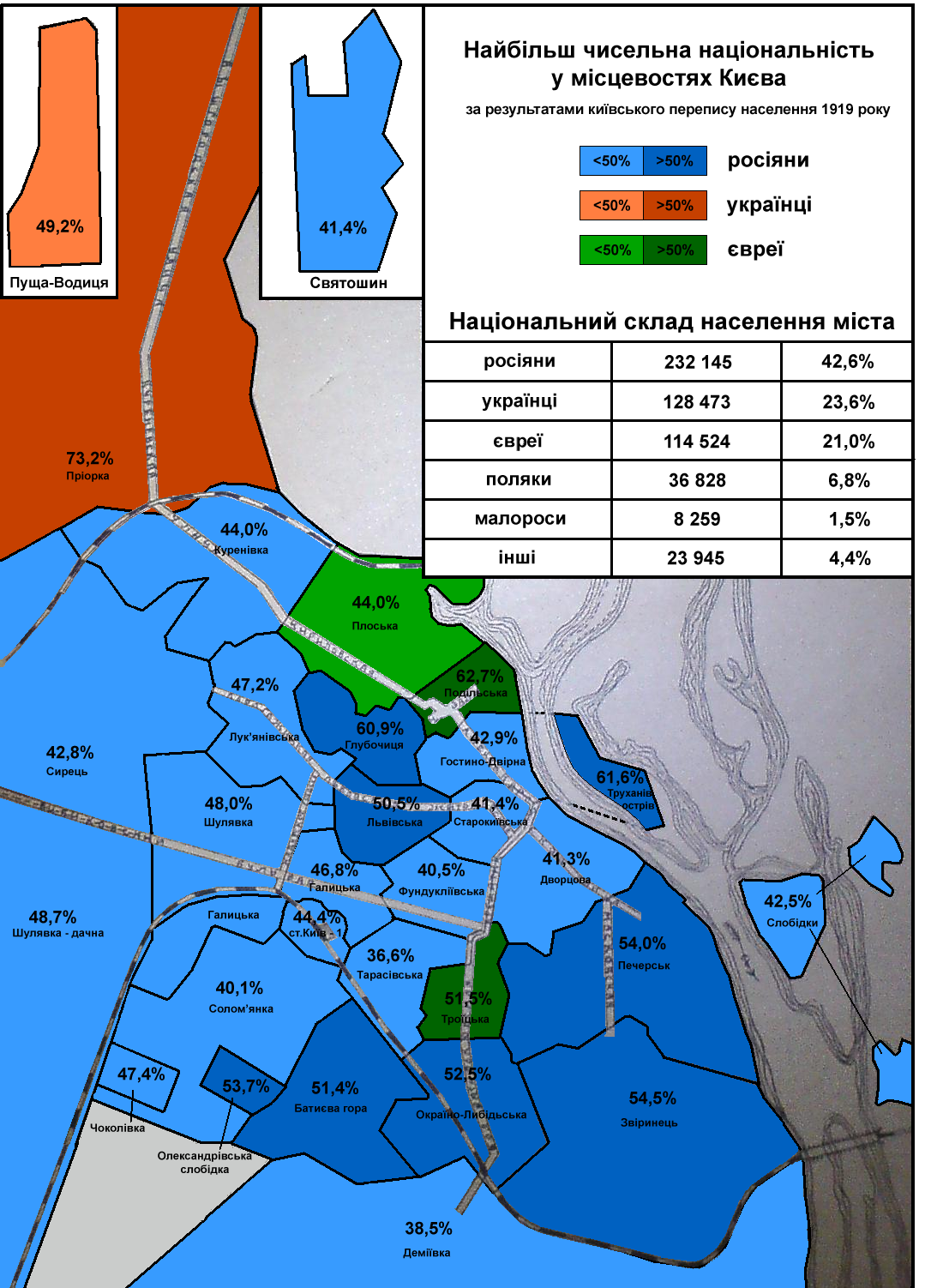
Largest nationality by district of Kiev according to the 1919 census Russian Jewish Ukrainian

The most numerous ethnic groups in the city were found to be Russians, Ukrainians, and Jews. The percentage of those identifying as Ukrainians within Kiev in 1919 increased from 12% to 24% when compared to the results of the 1917 census, while the percentage identifying as Russians fell from 50% to 42%.

Nationality	Male	Female	Total	Percentage
Russians	102,624	129,524	232,148	42.6%
Ukrainians	62,583	66,081	128,664	23.6%
Jews	55,675	58,849	114,524	21.0%
Poles	16,698	20,130	36,828	6.8%
Malorussians	3,971	4,288	8,259	1.5%
Other	11,540	8,688	20,228	3.7%
Unknown	2,169	1,549	3,718	0.7%

View source data.

=== Educational status ===
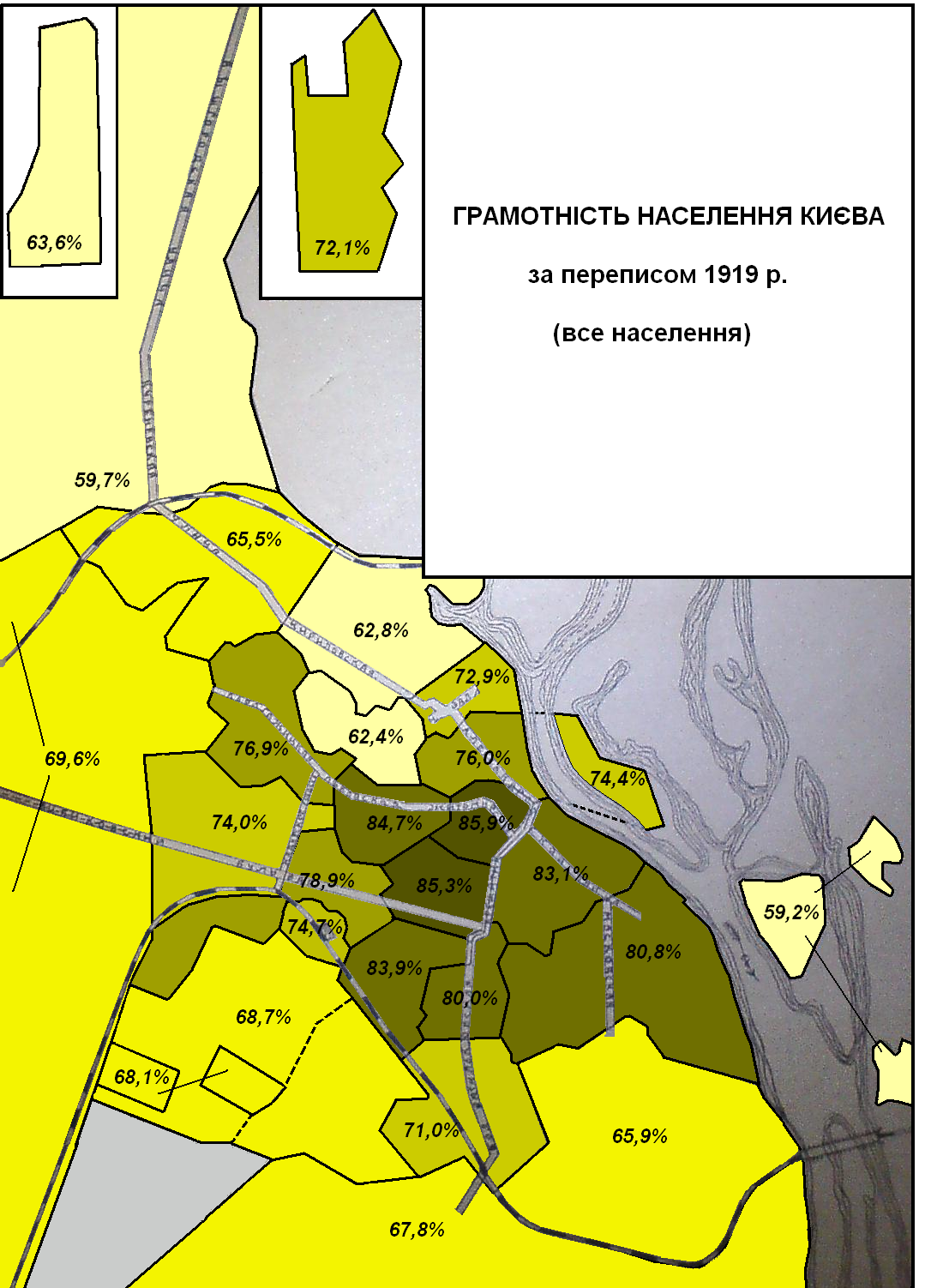
Literacy by district of Kiev according to the 1919 census

The average literacy of the population of Kiev was found to be 76.5%, 85.4% for males and 68.6% for females. Around 20% of the population was bilingually literate, being able to read and write multiple languages. Ethnically Jewish males had the highest literacy rate of any demographic, at over 90%. The district with the highest literacy was Starokyivska at 85.9%, while Slobidky had the lowest at 59.2%.

District	Literacy rate
Starokyivska	85.9%
Fundukliivska	85.3%
Lvivska	84.7%
Tarasivska	83.9%
Dvortsova	83.1%
Pechersk	80.8%
Troitska	80.0%
Halytska	78.9%
Lukianivska	76.9%
Hostyno-Dvirna	76.0%
Shuliavka	74.0%
Podilska	72.9%
Sviatoshyno	72.1%
Okraino-Lybidska	71.0%
Syrets-Dachna	69.6%
Solomianska	68.7%
Demiivka	67.8%
Zvirynets	65.9%
Kurenivka	65.5%
Pushcha-Vodytsia	63.6%
Ploska	62.8%
Hlybochytsia	62.4%
Priorka	59.7%
Slobidky	59.2%

== Aftermath ==
The census took place only 1 year before the All-Russian Agricultural Census of 1920, which covered the entire territory of the Ukrainian Soviet Socialist Republic, excluding some regions in which active combat was taking place. No census of solely the city of Kiev has taken place since the taking of the census of 1919, making it the final one.

== See also ==
1874 Kiev city census

Demographics of Kyiv
