= 1937 Soviet census =

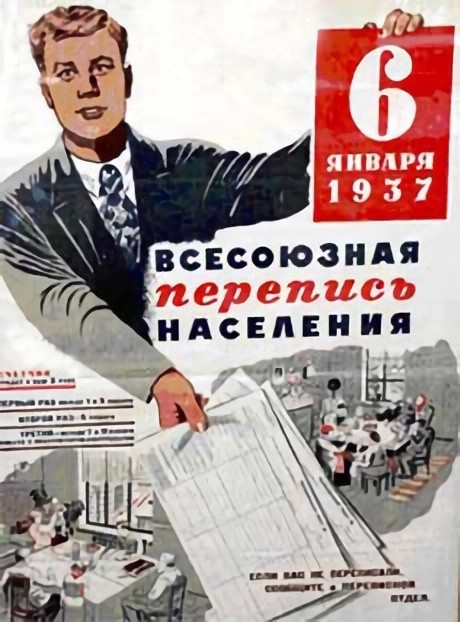
Information poster for the 1937 census

The 1937 Soviet census held on January 6, 1937, was a census taken within the Soviet Union. The census showed lower population figures than anticipated, although it still showed a population growth from the last census in 1926, from 147 million to 162 million people in 1937. After 10 days, the results of the census were announced to be "harmful" and the workers who were responsible for it were arrested and repressed.

== Delays ==
After the First All-Union Census of the Soviet Union of 1926, the next census was planned to be held in 1933. On 15 March 1932, the formal commission on census organization, chaired by Valerian Obolensky was created by the Statistical Commission (Tsentral'noye Upravleniye Narodno-Khozyaystvennogo Uchyota, TsUNKhU) of Gosplan. On 22 April 1932, Sovnarkom adopted the decision On Conducting the all-Union Census in December 1933. On 15 April 1933, Sovnarkom moved the date for the census to the beginning of 1935. On 23 June 1934, Sovnarkom further delayed the census to January 1936. On 15 June 1935, the census date was moved to December 1936. Finally, the census was conducted on 6 January 1937.

The multiple delays were most probably explained by the reluctance to show the demographic results of the famine of 1932–1933. The Soviet leadership had fanned great expectations of population growth.

== High expectations ==
On 26 January 1934, Joseph Stalin reported to the 17th Congress of the All-Union Communist Party (b) as one of the main achievements "Growth of population from 160.5 millions at the end of 1930 to the 168 millions at the end of 1933". On 1 December 1935, Joseph Stalin made a speech, on the Meeting of Kolkhozniks with the Soviet and Party leaders:

Everybody says that the material situation of workers has dramatically improved, that life has become better and more fun. It is of course true. But this has led the population to breed much faster than in the old days. The birth rate is higher, the death rate is lower and the pure population growth is far stronger. It is of course good and we welcome it. [Jolly murmurs in the auditorium.] Now every year we have a population growth of three million souls. It means that every year we grow as much as the whole of Finland. [Everybody laughs.]

Combining his reports, one could have expected to have a population of about 180 million in 1937.

Official statistics based on the registered birth and death rates implied that the 1937 census should show a population of 170–172 million. On 21 September 1935, Sovnarkom adopted a decision On the organization of registration of natural population changes (О постановке учёта естественного движения населения) most probably authored by Stalin:

The organs of registration were often used by the class enemies who had sneaked in there (priests, kulaks, Whites) and made their own counterrevolutionary saboteurs work to deliberately hide population growth by registering the same deaths multiple times.

Historian A. G. Volkov, claims that the idea that a significant number of individual deaths were double-counted is absurd, but Soviet historians claimed otherwise. On the other hand, not registering deaths, especially those who died by famine or incarceration, was common. For example, during the Holodomor, starving peasants tried (despite the official ban) to escape to the cities where they could earn or beg for food. Many of them died in the streets. In 1933, the street-cleaning service of Kiev picked up 9,472 dead bodies. Only 3,991 of them were officially counted as deaths on state records, while 5,481 were disposed of without formal registration, per instructions from the prosecutor's office.

== Preparation ==
The official commission for the preparation of the census was formed on 16 September 1935. It included:

- Vyacheslav Molotov, the Chairman of Sovnarkom,
- Lazar Kaganovich, Narkom for transport,
- Anastas Mikoyan, Narkom for the food industry,
- Nikolay Antipov, Vice Chairman of Sovnarkom,
- Nikolai Bulganin, Chairman of Mossovet,
- Emmanuil Kviring, Vice Chairman of Gosplan,
- Ivan Kraval, the chief of TsUNKhU,
- A. S. Popov, deputy to the chief of TsUNKhU.

Later the commission was joined by

- Valery Mezhlauk, the Chairman of Gosplan, who chaired the commission.

All the documents related to the census were prepared by TsUNKhU and edited personally by Joseph Stalin. A. G. Volkov speculates that never in modern history was such a routine technical matter as a census so micromanaged by such high officials.

A comparison between the two variants is shown in the table below:

Comparison between the TsUNKhU proposal and the final (by Stalin) census forms
| TsUNKhU proposal | | Stalin's edit | |
| Order | Question | Order | Question |
|---|---|---|---|
| 1 | Relations with the person that provides the main income (wife, son, aunt, foster child, etc.) | | removed |
| 2 | If temporarily absent, then: a) mention "temporarily absent" b) state the reason (vacations, business trip, visiting, etc.) c) for how long (days, months) absent | | removed |
| 3 | If lives temporarily, state "lives temporarily" | | removed |
| 4 | Sex (male – 1, female – 2) | 1 | Sex (male, female) |
| 5 | How many years since birth? For children younger than one year – months? Younger than one month – days? | 2 | How many years or months since birthday |
| 6 | Ethnicity | 3 | Nationality |
| 7 | Mother tongue | 4 | Mother tongue |
| 7 | Mother tongue | 5 | Religion |
| 8 | If foreign citizen, then of what state? | 7 | Citizen of what state? |
| 9 | Was born here? | | removed |
| 10 | If was not born here, then state: A. Where was born? a) Republic or oblast b) Uyezd? c) Raion? d) Name of the town, settlement? B. For how long lives here (in this town or settlement) | | removed |
| 11 | a) Whether able to read and write, or only read, or completely illiterate? b) If literate, then in what languages? | 8 | Whether literate? |
| 12 | Where do you study? Name of school, courses, etc. For the children going to a nursery, kindergarten, etc. state "kindergarten", "nursery", etc. | 9 | In what school do you study – primary, secondary or tertiary? |
| 12 | Where do you study? Name of school, courses, etc. For the children going to a nursery, kindergarten, etc. state "kindergarten", "nursery", etc. | 10 | What grade are you in? |
| 13 | Where have you studied? Name of the highest school (those graduated state grad., those who have not graduated state the grade or class they dropped) | 11 | Have you graduated from secondary or tertiary school? |
| 14 | Main occupation a) Type of the occupation or job, position, profession, specialization b) Award category (for workers) c) Position in the main occupation: worker, white-collar, apprentice, member of a collective farm, commune, co-operative, small business owner, etc. d) Name of the office or enterprise (kolkhoz, sovkhoz, factory, plant, shop, etc.) | 12 | Type of occupation in present |
| 14 | Main occupation a) Type of the occupation or job, position, profession, specialization b) Award category (for workers) c) Position in the main occupation: worker, white-collar, apprentice, member of a collective farm, commune, co-operative, small business owner, etc. d) Name of the office or enterprise (kolkhoz, sovkhoz, factory, plant, shop, etc.) | 14 | What social group do you belong to: workers, white collars, kolkhozniks, individual farmers, artisans, people of free professions, priests of a cult or nonworking elements? |
| 14 | Main occupation a) Type of the occupation or job, position, profession, specialization b) Award category (for workers) c) Position in the main occupation: worker, white-collar, apprentice, member of a collective farm, commune, co-operative, small business owner, etc. d) Name of the office or enterprise (kolkhoz, sovkhoz, factory, plant, shop, etc.) | 13 | Place of work (name of the enterprise, kolkhoz, office) |
| 15 | Secondary occupation a) Type b) Award category (for the workers) c) Position d) Name of the enterprise and its address | | removed |
| 16 | If you have income not from the occupation, state what type of income (pension, scholarship, rent, etc.) | | removed |
| 17 | If have no own income, then who provides for you (number of the person on the list and if not present state occupation, position and type of the enterprise) | | removed |
| 18 | If married, then for how many years? | 6 | Are you married? |

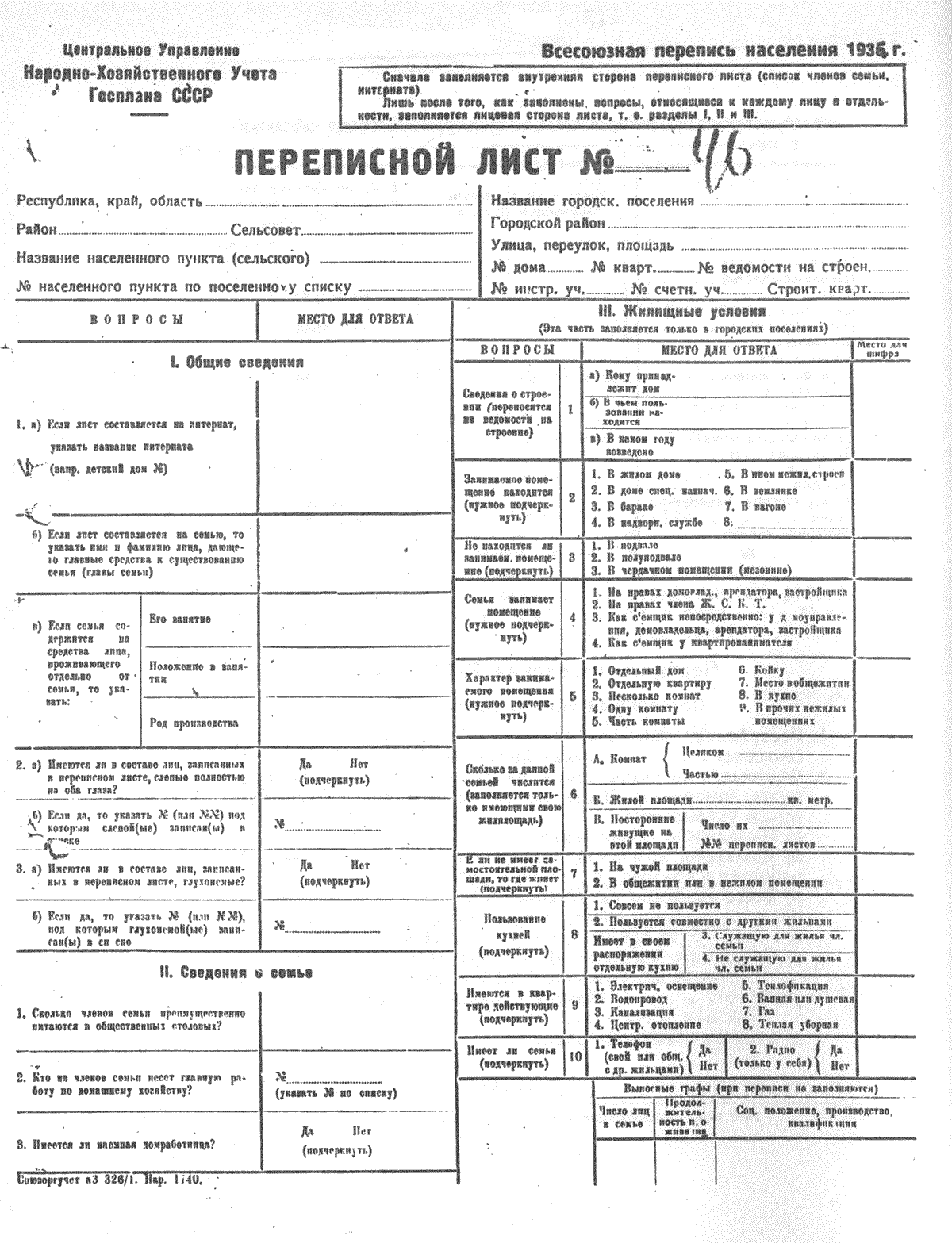
Form for the census, project TsUNKhU, common data on the family

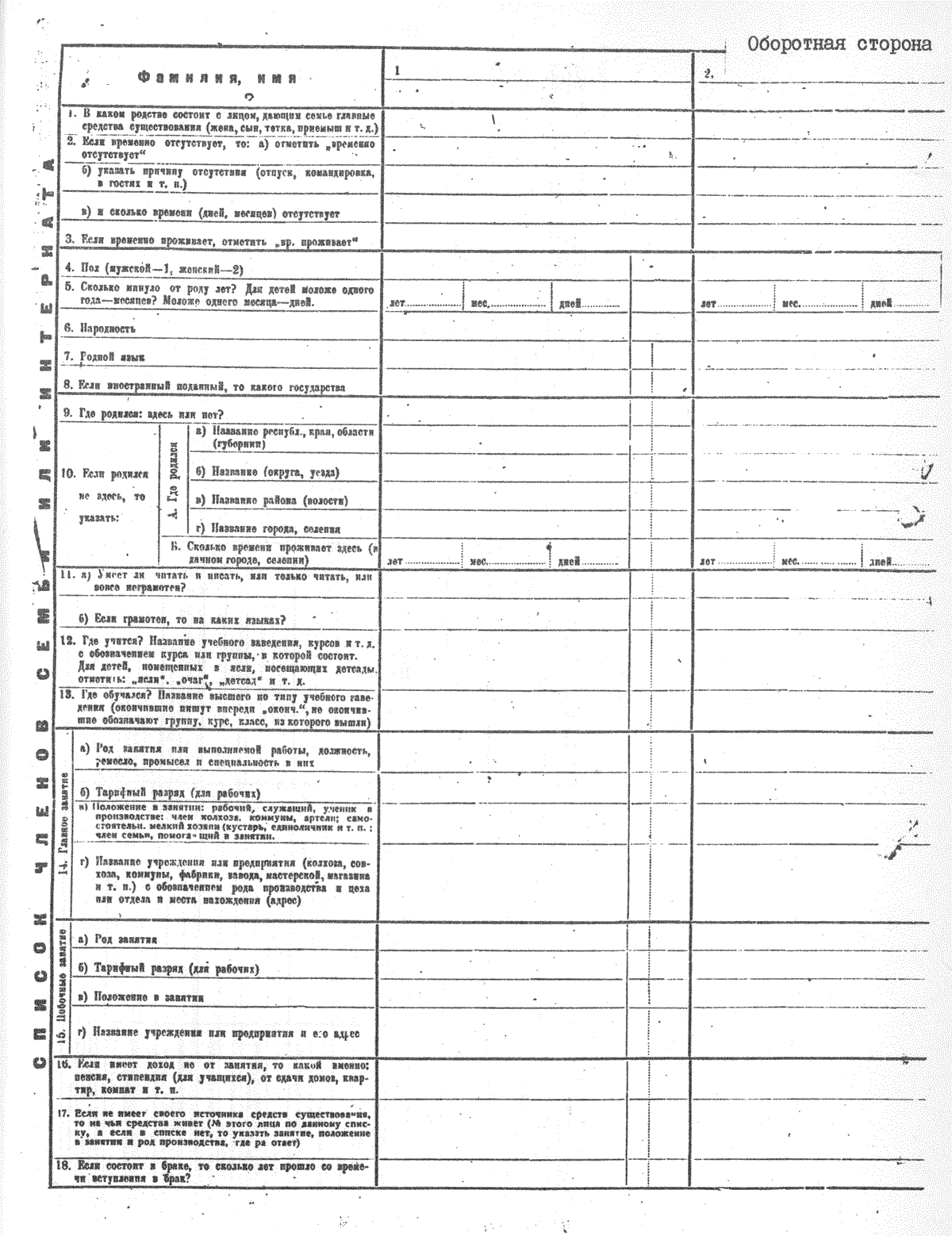
Form for the census, project TsUNKhU, data on family members

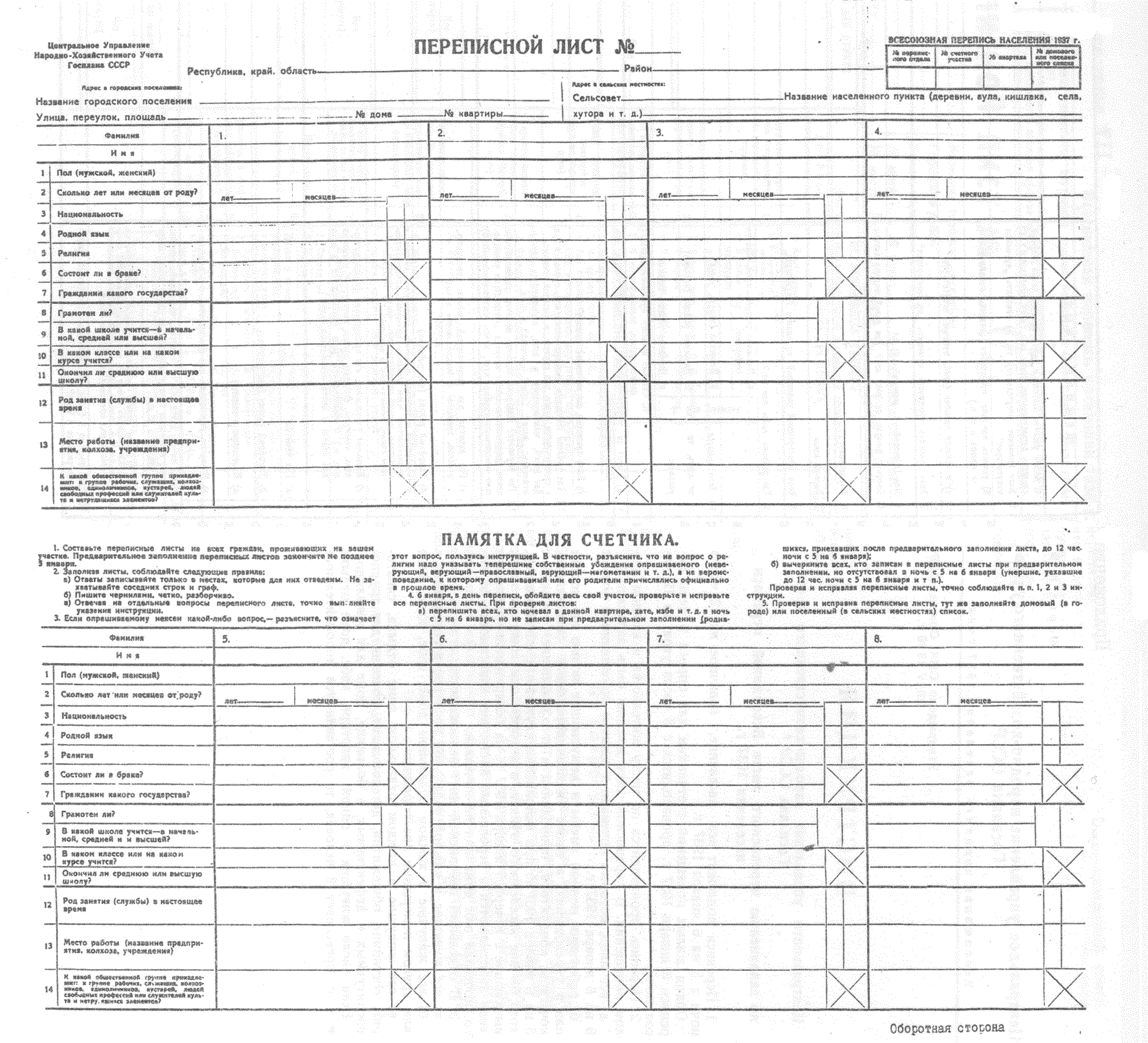
Final variant for the form

While his Soviet contemporaries praised Stalin's clarity and brevity in the design of these forms, modern scholars have observed a significant dumbing-down of the original proposals. A lot of information, e.g., about the social structures and income, and migration, could not be deduced from the new forms. Some questions (like the social category) were extremely vague and allowed different interpretations. Volkov argues that it was done deliberately. Stalin removed the double accounting (of those present at the time of the census and of those permanently living at an address), thus significantly reducing the accuracy of the calculations. It was coupled with a very maladroit time for the census: the night from 5 to 6 January – that is, the eve of Russian Orthodox Christmas, when people are extremely mobile.

The main new question introduced by Stalin was the question about religion. According to Volkov, Stalin expected the great majority of people to self-identify as atheists.

== Census ==
The census was held on 6 January 1937. In addition to the general census in the cities, towns and villages, a special census was held by the NKVD in the Gulag camps and among the border guards; by the Red Army, which took a census of military personnel; and the railroad, which took a census of passengers. When the data was first processed, it soon became obvious that the final enumeration would be little more than 162 million people. The worst disagreement between the expected and the obtained data were in Kazakhstan, Ukraine, and Southern Russia, the areas that were the strongest hit by the Holodomor famine.

On 11 January, the chief of TsUNKhU Kraval sent telegrams requesting a total recount of a whole settlement if any doubt arose that somebody might be missing there. Still, despite the total recount in 25,000 settlements, only 4,887 previously unenumerated persons were found. The preliminary result of the census, reported to Stalin in the middle of March 1937, was 162,039,470 people, much lower than the "criminally decreased" registered numbers of 170–172 million or Stalin's expectation of 180 million people.

Another serious blow was a very high percentage of people who stated that they were religious. 55.3 million, or 56.7%, of those who provided answers stated that they were religious (the question was asked only of people older than 16-years old), 42.2 million stated that they were atheists, and around 1 million refused to give an answer. Historian Valentina Zhiromskaya stated that people expected to be persecuted if they declared themselves as belonging to a religion, but considered the answer to be important: If many people would say that they are religious, the authorities would have to open the churches, was a common attitude. The Soviet authorities were so upset by the results of the census that they did not include a question on religion in any future censuses.

== Results ==
Preliminary results of the 1937 census (Note: The numbers are given according to the book, not the separate 1926 census results.)
| | 1926 census | 1937 census | Index |
|---|---|---|---|
| Russian SFSR | 93,107,746 | 103,967,924 | 111.7 |
| Ukrainian SSR | 28,925,976 | 28,387,609 | 98.1 |
| Belarusian SSR | 4,925,764 | 5,196,549 | 105.5 |
| Azerbaijani SSR | 2,301,911 | 3,056,978 | 132.8 |
| Georgian SSR | 2,652,626 | 3,376,946 | 127.3 |
| Armenian SSR | 872,775 | 1,209,253 | 138.6 |
| Uzbek SSR | 4,548,993 | 5,847,448 | 128.8 |
| Turkmen SSR | 1,026,826 | 1,168,538 | 118.8 |
| Tajik SSR | 983,812 | 1,382,168 | 134.6 |
| Kazakh SSR | 6,078,570 | 5,120,173 | 84.2 |
| Kyrgyz SSR | 998,268 | 1,369,667 | 137.2 |
| Total for the USSR | 146,413,267 | 160,083,253 | 109.3 |
| Red Army and Soviet Border Troops | 614,648 | 1,956,217 | 318.3 |
| Total | 147,027,915 | 162,039,470 | 110.2 |

== Aftermath ==
In March 1937, the four main statistical professionals working on the Census in TsUNKhU – the chief of the Sector for Population, Mikhail Kurman; chief of the Census Bureau, Olimpiy Kvitkin; his deputy, Lazar Brand; and the chief of the Sector for transportation and communication, Ivan Oblomov, were arrested and imprisoned. Soon they were joined by the Chief of TsUNKhU, Ivan Kraval, and the chiefs of most of the regional statistical centers, and executions followed. Many statisticians, newly appointed in place of those arrested, were soon arrested themselves. There is evidence that many managers appointed to lead the statistical organization tried to avoid starting their new jobs in desperate attempts to escape persecution.

On 25 September 1937, there was a special Sovnarkom decision proclaiming the census invalid and setting a new one for January 1939. A Pravda editorial stated that the "enemies of the people gave the census counters invalid instructions that led to the gross under-counting of the population, but the brave NKVD under the leadership of Nikolai Yezhov destroyed the snake's nest in the statistical bodies".

Stalin had to agree with the lower numbers of population growth. In his report to the 18th Congress of the All-Union Communist Party (bolsheviks) he said:

Some workers of the old Gosplan thought that during the second five-year plan (1933–1938) the annual growth of the population was three to four million people. It was a fantasy or worse.

The new Soviet Census (1939) showed a population figure of 170.6 million people, manipulated so as to match exactly the numbers stated by Stalin in his report to the 18th Congress of the All-Union Communist Party. No other censuses were conducted until 1959.

Today there is a consensus that the results of the 1939 census were adjusted (0.5 to 1.5 million persons were added to the reported population). Some historians consider the 1937 census the only more or less reliable source of demographic data for the period 1926–1959. However, demographers do not consider it as such. The data became influential for evaluating the number of victims of the Great Purge, World War I, and the 1930s famines, including the Holodomor.
