= Central Statistical Directorate =

Soviet socioeconomic statistics bureau

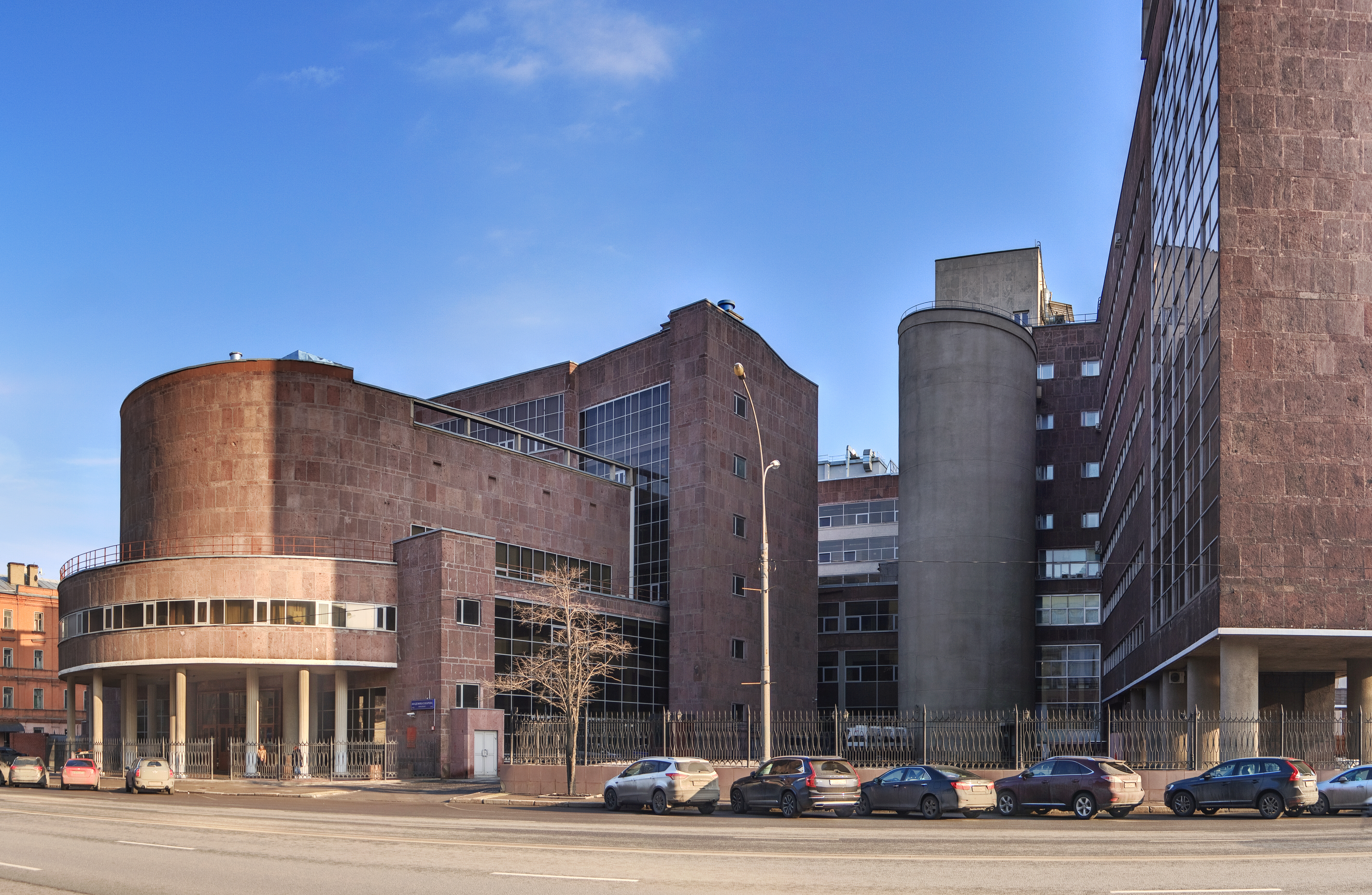
Tsentrosoyuz building

The Central Statistical Directorate (or Board or Administration, Russian: Центральное Статистическое Управление), abbreviated TsSU (Russian: ЦСУ), was the main statistical organization of the former Soviet Union; it was dissolved in 1987, replaced by Goskomstat.

The Administration had the following names:

1918–1923 — Central Statistical Administration of the RSFSR (Russian: Центральное статистическое управление РСФСР (ЦСУ РСФСР)), created by a decree of the Council of People's Commissars dated July 25, 1918
1923–1926 — Central Statistical Administration of the Council of People's Commissars of the USSR (Russian: Центральное статистическое управление при Совете Народных Комиссаров СССР)
1926–1930 — Central Statistical Administration of the USSR (Russian: Центральное статистическое управление СССР (ЦСУ СССР))
1930–1931 — Economic-Statistical Sector of Gosplan (Russian: Экономико-статистический сектор (ЭСС) Госплана СССР)
1931 — Sector of Economic Accounting of Gosplan (Russian: Сектор народно-хозяйственного учета Госплана СССР)
1931–1941 — Central Administration of Economic Accounting of Gosplan (Russian: Центральное управление народнохозяйственного учета (ЦУНХУ) Госплана СССР)
1941–1948 — Central Statistical Administration of Gosplan (Russian: Центральное статистическое управление (ЦСУ) Госплана СССР)
1948–1987 — Central Statistical Administration of the Council of Ministers of the USSR (Russian: Центральное статистическое управление (ЦСУ) при Совете Министров СССР)
