= 1970 Soviet census =

Census in the Soviet Union

A map of the Republics of the Soviet Union in 1970.

The 1970 All-Union Population Census (Russian: Всесоюзная перепись населения 1970 года, romanized: Vsesoyuznaya perepis' naseleniya 1970 goda) was the first census held in Soviet Union (USSR) in eleven years (since January 1959).

== Summary ==
The Soviet population in 1970 was recorded as being 241,720,134 people, an increase of over 15% from the 208,826,650 people recorded in the Soviet Union in the 1959 Soviet census.

While there was speculation that ethnic Russians would become a minority in the Soviet Union in 1970, the 1970 census recorded 53% (a bare majority) of the Soviet population as being ethnic Russians. In terms of total numbers, there were 129,015,140 ethnic Russians in the Soviet Union in 1970. Meanwhile, the largest ethnic minorities in the Soviet Union in 1970 were Ukrainians (40,753,246 in total), Uzbeks (9,195,093 in total), Belarusians (9,051,755 in total), Tatars (5,783,111 in total), Kazakhs (5,298,818 in total), and Azeris (4,379,937 in total).

The Jewish population in the Soviet Union unexpectedly declined (by about 5%; from about 2,279,000 to about 2,167,000) between 1959 and 1970, in part due to strong assimilation (especially in the Russian SSR and in the Ukrainian SSR, where three-fourths of all Soviet Jews lived).

The Muslim population in the Central Asian SSRs increased at a faster rate than the ethnic Russian population between 1959 and 1970 due to its higher birth rate. Indeed, the Muslim population grew by 52% between 1959 and 1970 whereas the ethnic Russian population grew by only 13% during the same time period. In addition, the number of certain ethnic minorities originally from China (especially the Uyghurs) increased in the U.S.S.R. between 1959 and 1970 due to many of them fleeing China during this time period. The ethnic Russian population in the Latvian SSR and in the Estonian SSR rapidly increased between 1959 and 1970 (in total numbers and as a percentage of their populations), while the ethnic Russian population increase in the mostly Roman Catholic Lithuanian SSR during this time period was much smaller. In addition, the ethnic German population in the Soviet Union grew by 14% between 1959 and 1970, from 1.6 million to 1.8 million.

=== Ukrainian SSR ===
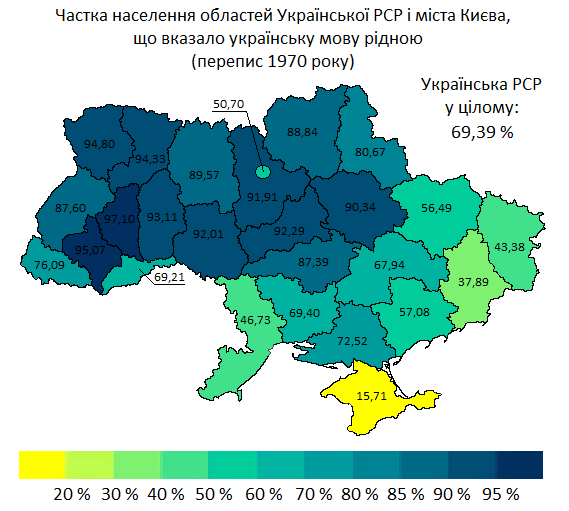
Percentage of the population of the oblasts of the Ukrainian SSR and the city of Kyiv who indicated Ukrainian as their native language.

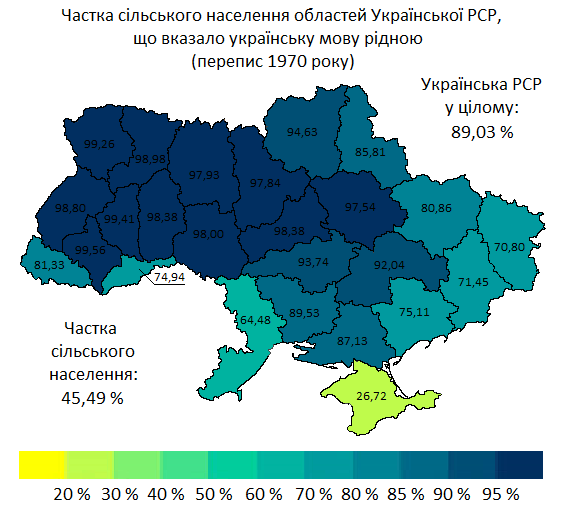
Percentage of the rural population of the oblasts of the Ukrainian SSR who indicated Ukrainian as their native language.

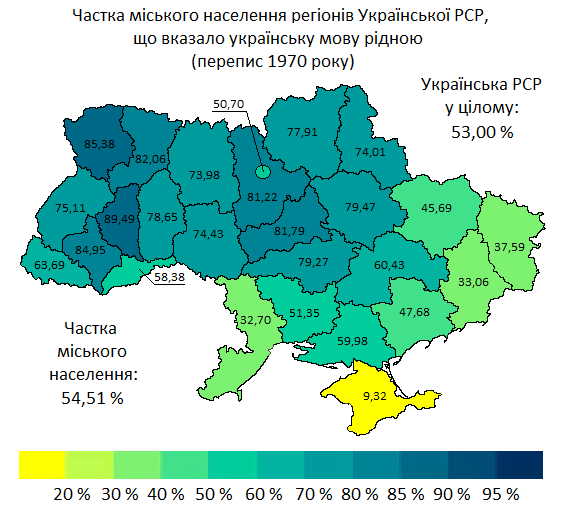
Percentage of the urban population of the regions of the Ukrainian SSR who indicated Ukrainian as their native language.

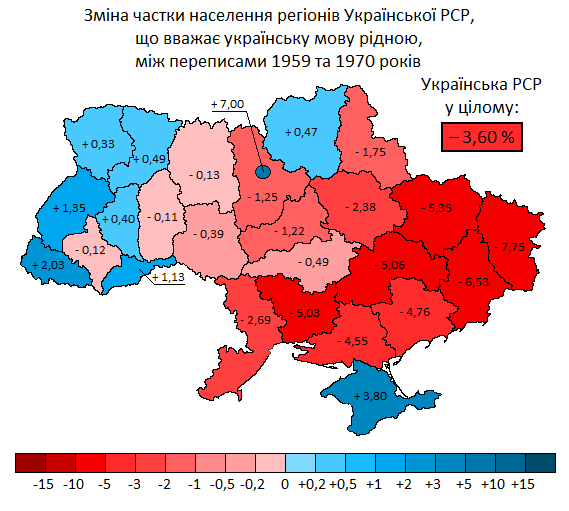
Change in the proportion of the population of the regions of the Ukrainian SSR who consider Ukrainian their native language between the 1959 and 1970 censuses.
