= 1959 Soviet census =

National census of the Soviet Union

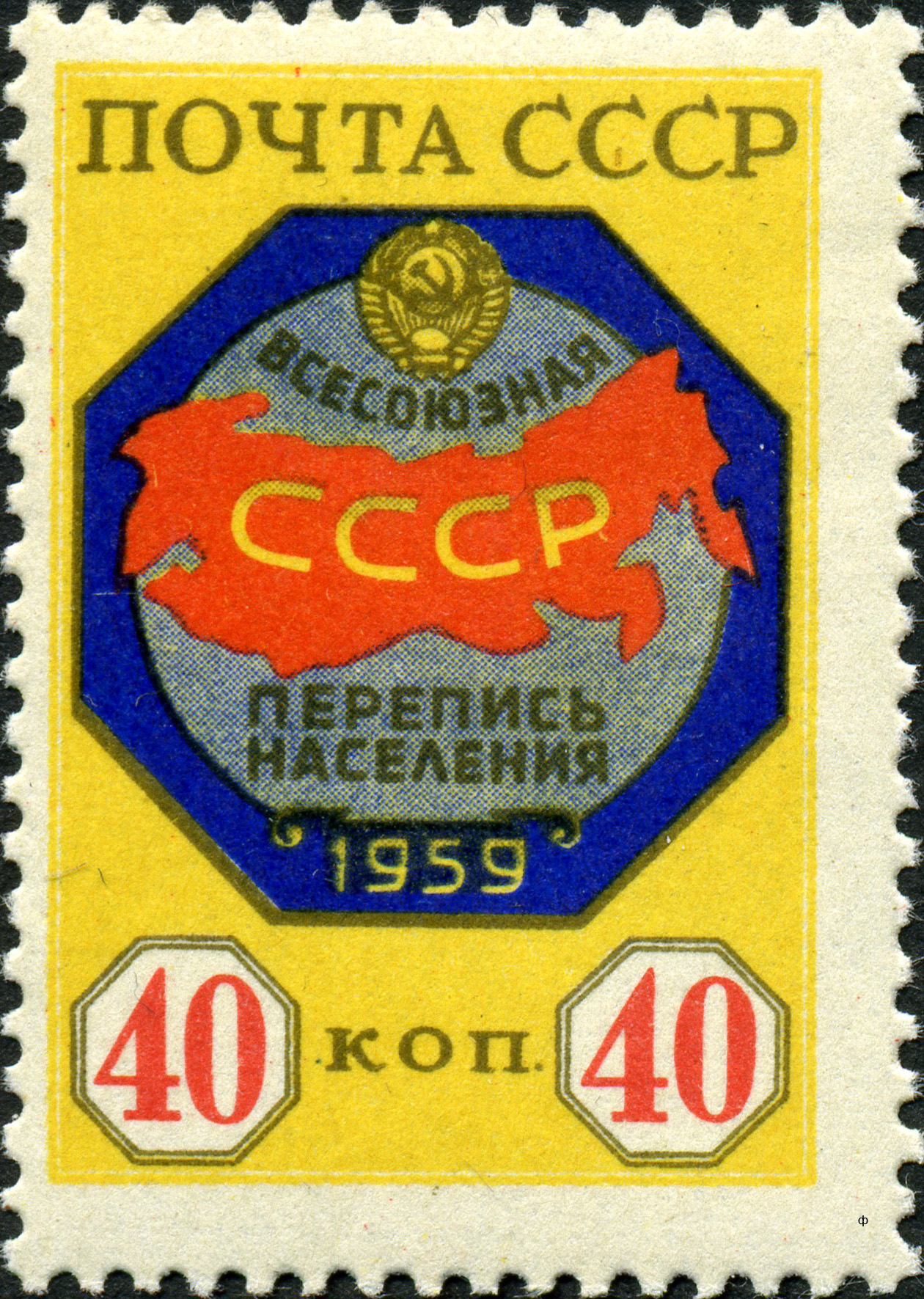
Postage stamp marking the census

The 1959 Soviet census conducted in January 1959 was the first post-World War II census held in the Soviet Union.

== Background ==
For a decade after World War II, there were no new population statistics released by the Soviet Union, and a proposal for a new Soviet census for 1949 was rejected by Soviet leader Joseph Stalin. During this time, most Western experts estimated that the population of the Soviet Union was between 215 and 220 million people, but in June 1956 (after Stalin's death), the Soviet government announced that the country's population at that point was only 200,200,000.

== Results ==
The new census announced the Soviet Union's population to be 208,826,650, an increase of almost forty million from the results of the last (disputed) census from 1939. A majority of this population increase was due to the Soviet territorial expansion of the 1939–1945 time period, rather than due to natural population growth. The deficit of men to women in the total Soviet population massively increased between 1939 and 1959, in large part due to World War II. The Soviet Union acquired some additional territories (after its 1939 census) in 1939–1945 in what is now Ukraine, Belarus, Moldova, the Baltic republics, Karelia, Tuva, and Kaliningrad Oblast. The Soviet Union was just 33% urban in 1939, but urbanized rapidly to become almost half (48%) urban in 1959.

The 1959 Soviet Union census reported populations in 126 nationality (ethnic group) categories, in comparison to only 97 categories in the 1939 census. Ethnic Russians still made up a majority of the Soviet population in 1959, but their percentage was smaller than in 1939 (again, partly due to the acquisition of mainly non-Russian territories in 1939–1945). Despite the acquisition of additional territories between these censuses, the Soviet Jewish population in 1959 (almost 2.3 million) was only about 75% of what it was in 1939, at least in large part due to the Holocaust. The populations of the Baltic Soviet Socialist Republics (which were heavily affected by World War II) did not change much between 1939 and 1959, with Lithuania actually experiencing a population decline during this time period. During the same time, the population of the Russian SFSR (which was heavily affected by World War II) increased by less than ten percent. The population increase in Ukraine and Byelorussia between 1939 and 1959 was completely or almost completely due to the Soviet territorial expansions of 1939–1940. Without these territorial expansions, Ukraine's population would have only barely increased and Belarus's population would have actually decreased between 1939 and 1959. The Central Asian and Caucasian Soviet Socialist Republics experienced large population increases between 1939 and 1959 despite the fact that they did not acquire any new territories during this time period.

This census is also noteworthy as being the first census to classify Brest Region population as Belorussians.

=== Ukrainian SSR ===
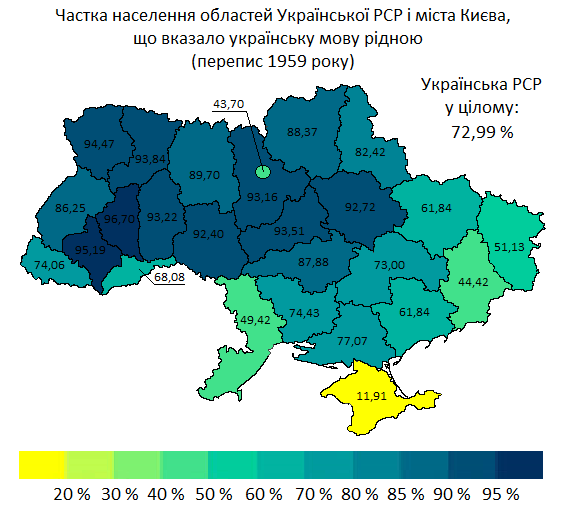
Percentage of the population of the oblasts of the Ukrainian SSR and the city of Kyiv who indicated Ukrainian as their native language.

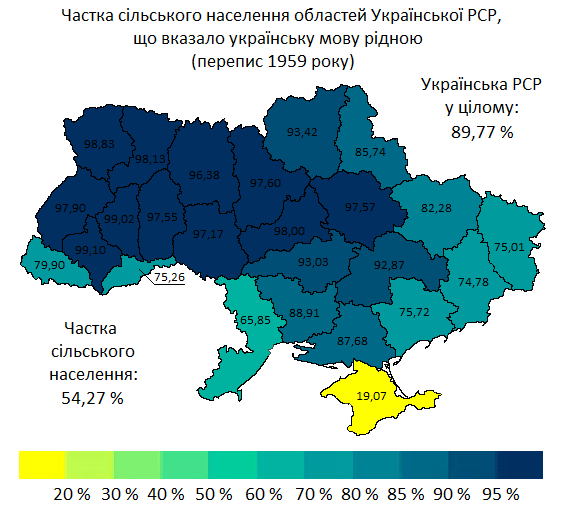
Percentage of the rural population of the oblasts of the Ukrainian SSR who indicated Ukrainian as their native language.

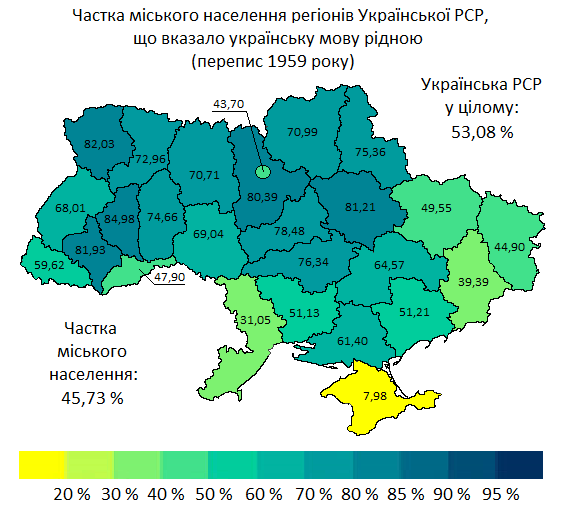
Percentage of the urban population of the regions of the Ukrainian SSR who indicated Ukrainian as their native language.

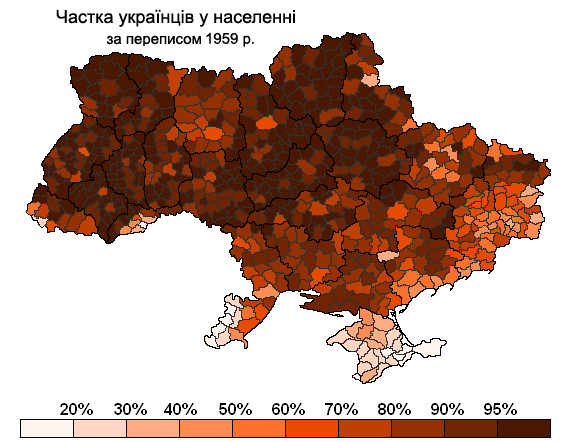
Share of ethnic Ukrainians in the raions of the Ukrainian SSR.

== City ranking ==
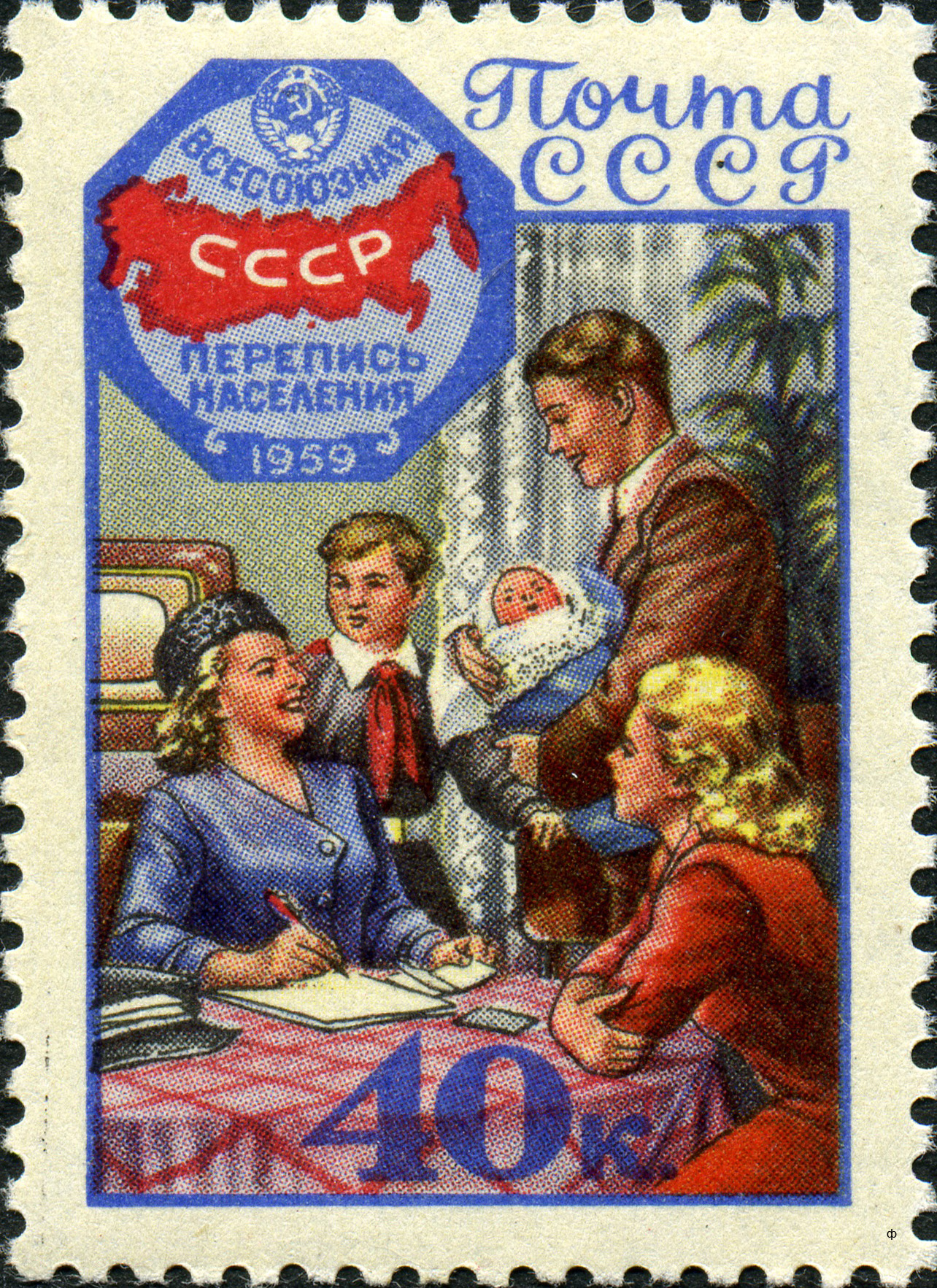
Stamp for the 1959 census

- Moscow – 5,045,905
- Leningrad – 3,321,196
- Kiev – 1,104,334
- Gor’ky – 941,962
- Kharkiv – 934,136
- Tashkent – 911,930
- Novosibirsk – 885,045
- Kuybyshev – 806,356
- Sverdlovsk – 778,602
- Stalino – 704,821
- Tbilisi – 694,664
- Chelyabinsk – 689,049
- Odessa – 667,182
- Dnepropetrovsk – 661,547
- Baku – 652,507
- Kazan – 646,806
- Perm – 629,118
- Rostov-on-Don – 599,542
- Stalingrad – 593,844
- Omsk – 581,108
- Riga – 580,423
- Ufa – 546,878
- Minsk – 509,500
- Yerevan – 509,340

== Ethnic groups ==
- Russians – 114,113,579
- Ukrainians – 37,252,930
- Byelorussians – 7,913,488
- Uzbeks – 6,015,416
- Tatars – 4,917,991
- Kazakhs – 3,621,610
- Azerbaijanis – 2,939,728
- Armenians – 2,786,912
- Georgians – 2,691,950
- Lithuanians – 2,326,094
- Jews – 2,266,334
- Moldovans – 2,214,139
- Germans – 1,619,655
- Chuvash people – 1,469,766
- Latvians – 1,399,539
- Tajiks – 1,396,939
- Poles – 1,380,282
- Mordvins – 1,285,116
- Turkmens – 1,001,585
- Bashkirs – 989,040
- Estonians – 988,616
- Kyrgyz people – 968,659
