= List of countries by population in 1989 =

Historical Demographics
Altar of Domitius Ahenobarbus
Articles
Demographic history
Historical demography
World population estimates
List of Countries by Population
| 1939 | 1989 | 2000 |

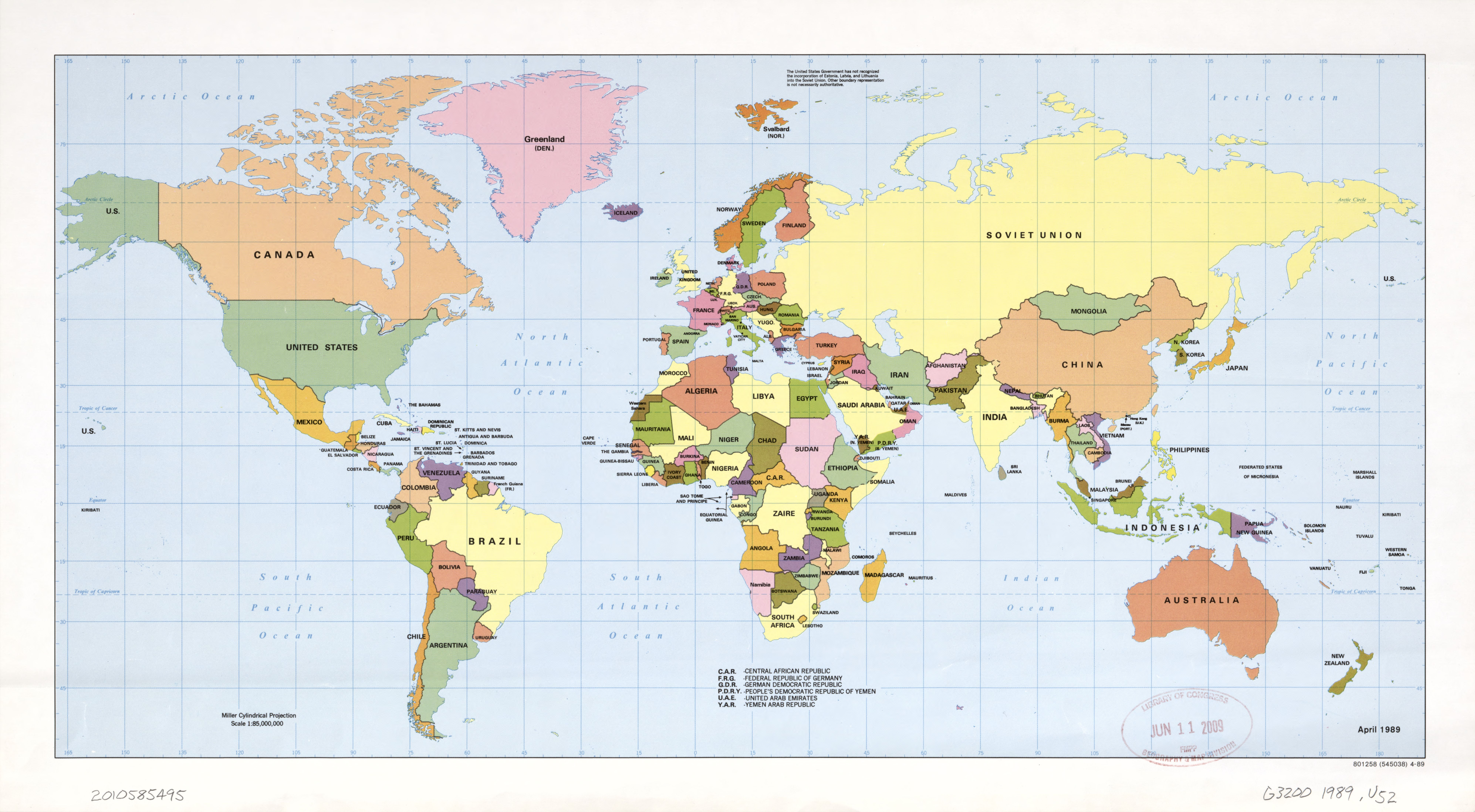
Map of countries in 1989

This is a list of countries by population in 1989, providing an overview of the world population before the fall of the Iron Curtain.

While the population data is almost exclusively dated 1989, political developments before the summer of 1990 are taken into account, including Yemeni unification and Namibian independence but not German reunification which was finalised only in October, the breakup of Yugoslavia and dissolution of the Soviet Union took place two years later, and the dissolution of Czechoslovakia three years later.

The numbers given in Aktuell '91 are fully compatible with the data given by the U.S. Census Bureau, where they can be compared, as the US Census Data refers to modern national borders instead of 1989 borders. Similar remarks apply to 1990 estimates in the List of countries by past and future population which also only apply to modern-day national borders. See also Soviet Census (1989) and 1990 United States census for comparison.

1. China 21.2%
2. India 15.5%
3. Soviet Union 5.50%
4. United States 4.70%
5. Indonesia 3.30%
6. Brazil 2.80%
7. Others 47.0%

| Rank | Country | Population 1989 estimate | Percentage of world's population |
|---|---|---|---|
| – | World population | 5,230,452,409 | |
| 1 | China | 1,110,000,000 | 21.2% |
| 2 | India | 814,000,000 | 15.5% |
| 3 | Soviet Union Republics: Russia –; Ukraine –; Uzbekistan –; Kazakhstan –; Byelorussia –; Azerbaijan –; Georgia –; Tajikistan –; Moldavia –; Kirghizia –; Lithuania –; Turkmenia –; Armenia –; Latvia –; Estonia – | 287,800,000 | 5.5% |
| 4 | United States | 250,140,000 | 4.7% |
| 5 | Indonesia | 175,000,000 | 3.3% |
| 6 | Brazil | 147,500,000 | 2.8% |
| 7 | Japan | 123,000,000 | 2.3% |
| 8 | Bangladesh | 112,800,000 | 2.1% |
| 9 | Pakistan | 107,000,000 | 2.0% |
| 10 | Nigeria | 92,800,000 | 1.8% |
| 11 | Mexico | 84,900,000 | 1.6% |
| 12 | Vietnam | 64,400,000 | 1.2% |
| 13 | United Kingdom Overseas territories: Hong Kong – 5,686,000 | 62,800,000 | 1.2% |
| 14 | West Germany | 62,000,000 | 1.1% |
| 15 | Philippines | 59,200,000 | 1.1% |
| 16 | Italy | 57,500,000 | 1.0% |
| 17 | France | 56,000,000 | 1.0% |
| 18 | Turkey | 55,400,000 | 1.0% |
| 19 | Egypt | 55,000,000 | 1.0% |
| 20 | Thailand | 55,000,000 | 1.0% |
| 21 | Iran | 55,000,000 | 1.0% |
| 22 | Ethiopia | 47,700,000 | 0.9% |
| 23 | South Korea | 42,400,000 | 0.8% |
| 24 | Myanmar | 39,900,000 | 0.7% |
| 25 | Spain | 39,200,000 | 0.7% |
| 26 | Poland | 37,900,000 | 0.7% |
| 27 | South Africa bantustans: Transkei – 2,323,000; Bophuthatswana – 1,323,600; Venda – 315,500; Ciskei – 677,800; Territory of South West Africa – 1,760,000; Lebowa – 1,700,000; Gazankulu – 514,300; QwaQwa – 157,600; KwaZulu – 3,400,000; KwaNdebele – 156,400; KaNgwane – 161,100 | 37,360,000 | 0.7% |
| 28 | Zaire | 34,000,000 | 0.6% |
| 29 | Argentina | 32,400,000 | 0.6% |
| 30 | Colombia | 32,300,000 | 0.6% |
| 31 | Canada | 26,200,000 | 0.5% |
| 32 | Morocco | 25,400,000 | 0.4% |
| 33 | Sudan | 25,000,000 | 0.4% |
| 34 | Tanzania | 24,700,000 | 0.4% |
| 35 | Algeria | 24,700,000 | 0.4% |
| 36 | Yugoslavia Republics: Serbia –; Croatia –; Bosnia and Herzegovina –; Macedonia –; Slovenia –; Montenegro – | 23,800,000 | 0.4% |
| 37 | Kenya | 23,700,000 | 0.4% |
| 38 | Romania | 23,200,000 | 0.4% |
| 39 | North Korea | 22,000,000 | 0.4% |
| 40 | Peru | 21,800,000 | 0.4% |
| 41 | Taiwan | 20,100,000 | 0.3% |
| 42 | Venezuela | 19,400,000 | 0.3% |
| 43 | Nepal | 18,800,000 | 0.3% |
| 44 | Iraq | 17,600,000 | 0.3% |
| 45 | Sri Lanka | 17,500,000 | 0.3% |
| 46 | Malaysia | 17,400,000 | 0.3% |
| 47 | Uganda | 16,800,000 | 0.3% |
| 48 | Australia | 16,800,000 | 0.3% |
| 49 | East Germany | 16,400,000 | 0.3% |
| 50 | Czechoslovakia | 15,700,000 | 0.3% |
| 51 | Afghanistan | 15,500,000 | 0.2% |
| 52 | Mozambique | 15,300,000 | 0.2% |
| 53 | Netherlands | 14,900,000 | 0.2% |
| 54 | Ghana | 14,100,000 | 0.2% |
| 55 | Saudi Arabia | 12,700,000 | 0.2% |
| 56 | Chile | 12,700,000 | 0.2% |
| 57 | Syria | 12,200,000 | 0.2% |
| 58 | Ivory Coast | 11,800,000 | 0.2% |
| 59 | Madagascar | 11,100,000 | 0.2% |
| 60 | Cameroon | 10,900,000 | 0.2% |
| 61 | Hungary | 10,600,000 | 0.2% |
| 62 | Cuba | 10,600,000 | 0.2% |
| 63 | Ecuador | 10,500,000 | 0.2% |
| 64 | Portugal Overseas territories: Macau – 337,000 | 10,300,000 | 0.19% |
| 65 | Greece | 10,000,000 | 0.19% |
| 66 | Belgium | 9,900,000 | 0.18% |
| 67 | Zimbabwe | 9,100,000 | 0.17% |
| 68 | Bulgaria | 9,000,000 | 0.17% |
| 69 | Angola | 9,000,000 | 0.17% |
| 70 | Guatemala | 8,900,000 | 0.17% |
| 71 | Somalia | 8,600,000 | 0.16% |
| 72 | Sweden | 8,500,000 | 0.16% |
| 73 | North Yemen | 8,500,000 | 0.16% |
| 74 | Mali | 8,500,000 | 0.16% |
| 75 | Malawi | 8,100,000 | 0.15% |
| 76 | Tunisia | 8,000,000 | 0.15% |
| 77 | Cambodia | 7,900,000 | 0.15% |
| 78 | Zambia | 7,800,000 | 0.14% |
| 79 | Senegal | 7,700,000 | 0.14% |
| 80 | Burkina Faso | 7,700,000 | 0.14% |
| 81 | Austria | 7,600,000 | 0.14% |
| 82 | Niger | 7,400,000 | 0.14% |
| 83 | Rwanda | 7,300,000 | 0.13% |
| 84 | Dominican Republic | 7,300,000 | 0.13% |
| 85 | Bolivia | 7,000,000 | 0.13% |
| 86 | Switzerland | 6,700,000 | 0.12% |
| 87 | Haiti | 6,200,000 | 0.11% |
| 88 | Guinea | 6,100,000 | 0.11% |
| 89 | Chad | 5,700,000 | 0.10% |
| 90 | El Salvador | 5,500,000 | 0.10% |
| 91 | Burundi | 5,200,000 | 0.099% |
| 92 | Honduras | 5,100,000 | 0.097% |
| 93 | Denmark | 5,100,000 | 0.097% |
| 94 | Finland | 4,970,000 | 0.095% |
| 95 | People's Republic of Benin | 4,600,000 | 0.087% |
| 96 | Sierra Leone | 4,300,000 | 0.082% |
| 97 | Libya | 4,300,000 | 0.082% |
| 98 | Norway | 4,200,000 | 0.080% |
| 99 | Paraguay | 4,000,000 | 0.076% |
| 100 | Laos | 3,900,000 | 0.074% |
| 101 | Jordan | 3,900,000 | 0.074% |
| 102 | Nicaragua | 3,700,000 | 0.070% |
| 103 | Ireland | 3,700,000 | 0.070% |
| 104 | Papua New Guinea | 3,600,000 | 0.068% |
| 105 | New Zealand | 3,400,000 | 0.065% |
| 106 | Togo | 3,200,000 | 0.061% |
| 107 | Albania | 3,200,000 | 0.061% |
| 108 | Central African Republic | 3,000,000 | 0.057% |
| 109 | Uruguay | 3,000,000 | 0.057% |
| 110 | Lebanon | 2,900,000 | 0.055% |
| 111 | Costa Rica | 2,900,000 | 0.055% |
| 112 | Singapore | 2,650,000 | 0.050% |
| 113 | Liberia | 2,500,000 | 0.047% |
| 114 | Israel | 2,500,000 | 0.047% |
| 115 | South Yemen | 2,500,000 | |
| 116 | Jamaica | 2,400,000 | 0.045% |
| 117 | Panama | 2,300,000 | 0.043% |
| 118 | Mongolia | 2,100,000 | 0.040% |
| 119 | Palestine | 2,000,000 | 0.038% |
| 120 | People's Republic of the Congo | 2,000,000 | 0.038% |
| 121 | Kuwait | 1,970,000 | 0.037% |
| 122 | Mauritania | 1,800,000 | 0.034% |
| 123 | Lesotho | 1,700,000 | 0.032% |
| 124 | United Arab Emirates | 1,500,000 | 0.028% |
| 125 | Bhutan | 1,500,000 | 0.028% |
| 126 | Oman | 1,400,000 | 0.026% |
| 127 | Trinidad and Tobago | 1,300,000 | 0.024% |
| 128 | Botswana | 1,200,000 | 0.022% |
| 129 | Gabon | 1,100,000 | 0.021% |
| 130 | Mauritius | 1,050,000 | 0.020% |
| 131 | Guinea-Bissau | 929,000 | 0.017% |
| 132 | The Gambia | 840,000 | 0.016% |
| 133 | Fiji | 758,000 | 0.014% |
| 134 | Swaziland | 757,000 | 0.014% |
| 135 | Guyana | 730,000 | 0.014% |
| 136 | Cyprus | 696,000 | 0.013% |
| 137 | Bahrain | 483,000 | 0.0092% |
| 138 | Comoros | 460,000 | 0.0087% |
| 139 | Suriname | 400,000 | 0.0076% |
| 140 | Equatorial Guinea | 389,000 | 0.0074% |
| 141 | Djibouti | 383,000 | 0.0073% |
| 142 | Luxembourg | 377,000 | 0.0072% |
| 143 | Malta | 358,000 | 0.0068% |
| 144 | Qatar | 342,000 | 0.0065% |
| 145 | Cape Verde | 337,000 | 0.0064% |
| 146 | Solomon Islands | 314,000 | 0.0060% |
| 147 | Brunei | 267,000 | 0.0051% |
| 148 | Barbados | 256,000 | 0.0048% |
| 149 | Iceland | 251,000 | 0.0047% |
| 150 | Bahamas | 247,000 | 0.0047% |
| 151 | Maldives | 202,000 | 0.0038% |
| 152 | Belize | 180,000 | 0.0034% |
| 153 | Samoa | 169,000 | 0.0032% |
| # | Sahrawi Arab Democratic Republic | 169,000 | 0.0032% |
| 154 | Vanuatu | 150,000 | 0.0028% |
| 155 | Saint Lucia | 128,000 | 0.0024% |
| 156 | São Tomé and Príncipe | 114,000 | 0.0021% |
| 157 | Tonga | 108,000 | 0.0020% |
| 158 | Saint Vincent and the Grenadines | 108,000 | 0.0020% |
| 159 | Grenada | 100,000 | 0.0019% |
| 160 | Antigua and Barbuda | 86,000 | 0.0016% |
| 161 | Dominica | 76,000 | 0.0014% |
| 162 | Seychelles | 70,000 | 0.0013% |
| 163 | Kiribati | 67,000 | 0.0012% |
| 164 | Andorra | 49,000 | 0.00093% |
| 165 | Saint Kitts and Nevis | 40,000 | 0.00076% |
| 166 | Liechtenstein | 30,000 | 0.00057% |
| 167 | Monaco | 29,000 | 0.00055% |
| 168 | San Marino | 23,000 | 0.00043% |
| 169 | Tuvalu | 9,000 | 0.00017% |
| 170 | Nauru | 8,100 | 0.00015% |

== See also ==
- List of countries
- List of countries by area
- List of countries by past and future population
- List of countries by population
- List of countries by population in 1900
- List of countries by population in 2000
- List of countries by population in 2005
- List of countries by population in 2010
- List of continents by population
- List of religious populations
- World population
- Human geography
- United Nations
