= List of countries by population in 1939 =

Historical Demographics
Altar of Domitius Ahenobarbus
Articles
Demographic history
Historical demography
World population estimates
List of countries by population
1900	1939	1989

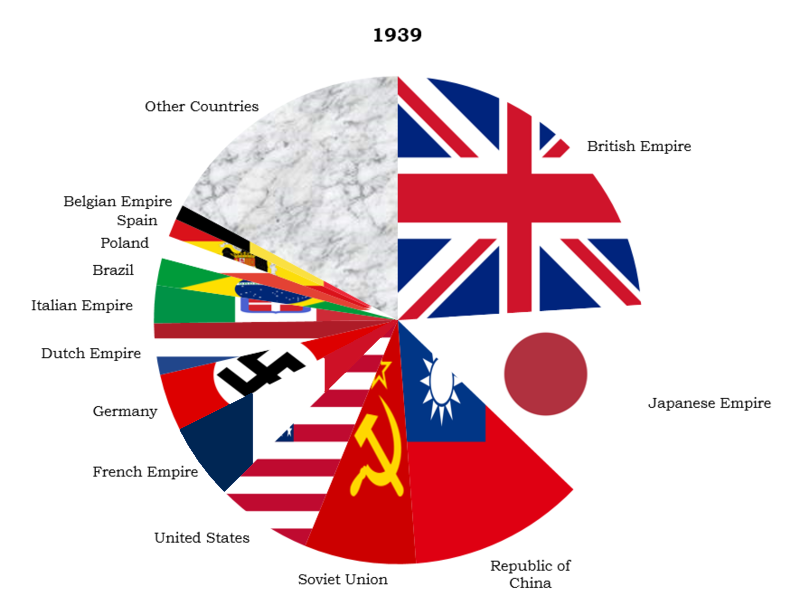

This is a list of countries by population in 1939 (including any dependent, occupied or colonized territories for empires), providing an approximate overview of the world population before World War II.

Estimate numbers are from the beginning of the year, and exact population figures are for countries that were having a census in the year 1939 (which were on various dates in that year).

== Map ==
World map of 1938 showing countries, colonies and sea routes

== List ==
Rank	Country/territory	Population c. 1939	Percentage of world's population
	World	2,300,000,000	–
1	British Empire subdivisions: United Kingdom – 47,760,000; India – 377,800,000; British Africa – 80,235,225 constituents; Nigeria – 19,753,000; Anglo-Egyptian Sudan – 6,342,500; Tanganyika – 5,372,812; Kenya – 4,500,000; Uganda – 3,747,200; Gold Coast – 3,700,300; Sierra Leone – 1,974,700; Nyasaland – 1,680,000; Southern Rhodesia – 1,400,000; Northern Rhodesia – 1,390,000; British Cameroons – 1,024,425; Basutoland – 622,000; Mauritius – 422,000; British Somaliland – 350,000; Bechuanaland Protectorate – 275,000; Gambia – 205,000; Swaziland – 158,000; Zanzibar – 150,088; Seychelles – 31,500; Burma – 16,119,000; Australia (Note: Although a dominion, Australia had limited sovereignty until the adoption of the Statute of Westminster Adoption Act 1942.) – 6,968,000 territories; Papua and New Guinea – 1,292,000; Nauru (Note: Nauru was administered by Australia with New Zealand and the UK as co-trustees.) – 3,400; Norfolk Island – 1,100; Malaya – 5,386,300 constituents; Federated Malay States — 2,145,000; Unfederated Malay States — 1,871,000; Straits Settlements — 1,370,300; British West Indies – 2,410,600 constituents; Jamaica – 1,178,600; British Honduras – 55,000; Trinidad and Tobago – 476,000; British Guiana – 339,000; Windward Islands – 216,100 constituents; Grenada – 89,000; Saint Lucia – 69,100; Saint Vincent and the Grenadines – 58,000; Barbados – 177,000; Leeward Islands – 142,400 constituents; Dominica – 50,600; Saint Christopher-Nevis-Anguilla – 37,600; Antigua and Barbuda – 34,100; Montserrat – 13,700; British Virgin Islands – 6,400; The Bahamas – 67,000; Bermuda – 30,500; New Zealand (Note: Although a dominion, New Zealand had limited sovereigntiy until it adopted the Statute of Westminster Adoption Act 1947) – 1,628,500 territories; Trust Territory of Western Samoa — 59,600; Cook Islands — 13,800; Niue-Fekai — 4,000; Union Islands — 1,300; Mandatory Palestine – 1,466,500; Hong Kong — 1,282,000; Aden (Note: The population of the Crown Colony of Aden was derived by taking the population ratio between North and South Yemen in 1975 (see reference) and applying that same distribution to both Yemens in 1939.) – 994,000; Jordan — 991,000; Sarawak — 460,000; British Western Pacific Territories – 420,520 constituents; Fiji — 210,500; Solomon Islands — 95,000; New Hebrides — 43,000; Tonga — 35,000; Gilbert and Ellice Islands — 33,400; Pitcairn Islands – 220; Cyprus — 393,000; Muscat and Oman — 386,000; Newfoundland – 314,900; North Borneo — 300,000; Malta – 269,000; Trucial States — 110,000; Maldives — 87,000; Kuwait — 50,000; Brunei – 38,000; Gibraltar – 19,000; Saint Helena – 4,700; Falkland Islands – 2,400	548,145,445	23.8%
2	Japanese Empire subdivisions: Japan – 71,900,000; Recently occupied China – 200,000,000 including; Reformed Government of the Republic of China; Provisional Government of the Republic of China; Mengjiang; Manchukuo – 50,000,000; Korea – 24,326,000; Formosa – 6,586,000; South Pacific Mandate – 127,000	304,119,000	13.2%
3	China	267,568,000	11.6%
4	Soviet Union subdivisions: Russian SFSR – 108,377,000; Ukrainian SSR – 32,425,000; Uzbek SSR – 6,271,269; Kazakh SSR – 6,081,000; Byelorussian SSR – 5,568,994; Georgian SSR – 3,540,023; Azerbaijan SSR – 3,205,000; Kirghiz SSR – 1,458,213; Tajik SSR – 1,458,091; Armenian SSR – 1,282,338; Turkmen SSR – 1,251,883	170,918,811	7.4%
5	United States subdivisions: United States – 131,028,000; Hawaii – 422,770; Alaska – 59,278; Puerto Rico – 1,543,913; Philippines – 16,000,303; Guam – 22,800	138,499,069	6.0%
6	French Empire subdivisions: France – 42,000,000; French Indochina – 24,664,000; French North Africa (Note: According to the preceding reference, French Morocco contained 90% of the Moroccan population in 1955. This ratio was used for the Moroccan population of 1939. Please update if more accurate information is available.) – 16,920,000 constituents; French Algeria – 7,517,000; French Morocco – 6,622,200; French Tunisia – 2,781,000; French West Africa – 13,393,200 constituents; French Sudan – 3,635,100; French Upper Volta – 3,308,000; French Guinea – 2,065,500; Colony of Niger – 1,809,600; French Dahomey – 1,532,000; French Togoland – 1,043,000; French Equatorial Africa – 4,421,000 constituents; French Congo – 2,400,000; French Chad – 2,021,000; French Madagascar – 3,900,000; Syria – 2,516,000; French Cameroons – 2,381,272; Lebanon – 1,168,000; French Comoros – 137,000; French Polynesia – 51,200; French Guiana – 24,000	111,524,472	4.8%
7	Germany subdivisions: Germany – 69,314,000; Protectorate of Bohemia and Moravia – 7,380,000; Austria – 6,658,000; Sudetenland – 3,261,636; Memel – 141,645	86,755,281	3.8%
8	Dutch Empire subdivisions: Netherlands – 8,729,000; Dutch East Indies – 69,435,000; Dutch Guyana – 173,100; Aruba – 29,200; Curaçao and Dependencies – ?; Sint Maarten – ?	78,366,300	3.4%
9	Italian Empire subdivisions: Italy – 43,400,000; Italian East Africa – 12,100,000; Albania – 1,063,893; Italian Libya – 893,774; Italian Islands of the Aegean – 132,489; Italian concession of Tientsin – 6,261	57,596,517	2.5%
10	Brazil	40,289,000	1.8%
11	Poland	34,849,000	1.5%
12	Spanish Empire subdivisions: Spain – 25,637,000; Spanish Morocco (Note: Population distribution according to first reference was 10% in Spanish Morocco and 90% for French Morocco in 1955. This ratio was used to divide the 1939 total Moroccan population figures. Please update if more accurate information is found.) – 735,800; Spanish Sahara– 450,000	26,822,800	1.2%
13	Belgian Empire subdivisions: Belgium – 8,387,000; Belgian Congo – 10,304,100; Ruanda-Urundi – 3,800,000	22,491,000	1.0%
14	Romania	19,933,800	0.9%
15	Mexico	19,320,000	0.8%
16	Portuguese Empire subdivisions: Portugal – 7,627,000; Mozambique – 5,086,500; Angola – 3,740,800; Portuguese India – 624,100 constituents; Goa – 583,700; Dadra and Nagar Haveli – 40,400; Portuguese Timor – 480,000; Portuguese Guinea – 420,000; Macau – 374,700; Cape Verde – 181,300; São Tomé and Príncipe – 61,000	18,595,400	0.8%
17	Turkey	17,370,000	0.8%
18	Egypt	16,492,000	0.7%
19	Yugoslavia	15,490,000	0.7%
20	Thailand	15,023,000	0.7%
21	Persia	14,340,000	0.6%
22	Argentina	13,948,000	0.6%
23	Canada (Note: semi-independent British dominion) (Semi-independent British dominion)	11,267,000	0.5%
24	Union of South Africa (Note: Semi-independent British dominion) (Semi-independent British dominion)	10,160,000	0.4%
25	Hungary	9,129,000	0.4%
26	Colombia	8,896,000	0.4%
27	Greece	7,222,000	0.3%
28	Afghanistan	6,970,000	0.3%
29	Peru	6,572,000	0.3%
30	Bulgaria	6,458,000	0.3%
31	Sweden	6,341,000	0.3%
32	Nepal	6,087,000	0.3%
33	Chile	4,914,000	0.2%
34	Cuba	4,235,000	0.18%
35	Switzerland	4,210,000	0.18%
36	Denmark (including colonies) subdivisions: Denmark – 3,795,000; Faroe Islands – 26,900; Greenland – 18,400	3,840,300	0.17%
37	Finland	3,700,000	0.16%
38	Iraq (semi-independent British protectorate)	3,698,000	0.16%
39	Venezuela	3,628,000	0.16%
40	Ireland	2,960,000	0.13%
41	Norway	2,945,000	0.13%
42	Yemen (Note: The population of the Mutawakkilite Kingdom of Yemen was derived by taking the population ratio between North and South Yemen in 1975 (see reference) and applying that same distribution to both Yemeni states in 1939)	2,775,000	0.12%
43	Haiti	2,707,000	0.12%
44	Saudi Arabia	2,670,000	0.12%
45	Bolivia	2,659,000	0.12%
46	Slovakia (semi-independent German protectorate)	2,655,000	0.12%
47	Lithuania	2,575,000	0.11%
48	Ecuador	2,412,000	0.10%
49	Guatemala	2,150,000	0.093%
50	Latvia	1,994,500	0.087%
51	Uruguay	1,953,000	0.085%
52	Dominican Republic	1,634,000	0.071%
53	El Salvador	1,459,600	0.063%
54	Estonia	1,134,000	0.049%
55	Honduras	1,096,950	0.048%
56	Albania	1,073,000	0.047%
57	Tibet	1,000,000	0.043%
58	Paraguay	931,800	0.041%
59	Mongolia	819,000	0.036%
60	Nicaragua	806,000	0.035%
61	Liberia	780,000	0.034%
62	Costa Rica	623,400	0.027%
63	Panama	605,000	0.026%
64	Bhutan (semi-independent British protectorate)	470,000	0.020%
65	Danzig (Note: The figures for Danzig are from 1929.)	408,000	0.018%
66	Luxembourg	295,000	0.013%
67	Iceland	118,900	0.0052%
68	Monaco	24,000	0.0010%
69	San Marino	14,500	0.00063%
70	Liechtenstein	13,000	0.00057%
71	Andorra	6,000	0.00026%
72	Vatican City	1,000	0.000046%

== See also ==
- List of countries by population
- List of countries by population in 1900
- List of countries by population in 1989
- List of countries by population in 2000
- List of countries by population in 2005
- List of territories occupied by the United Kingdom
- List of territories occupied by Imperial Japan
