= List of countries by population in 2000 =

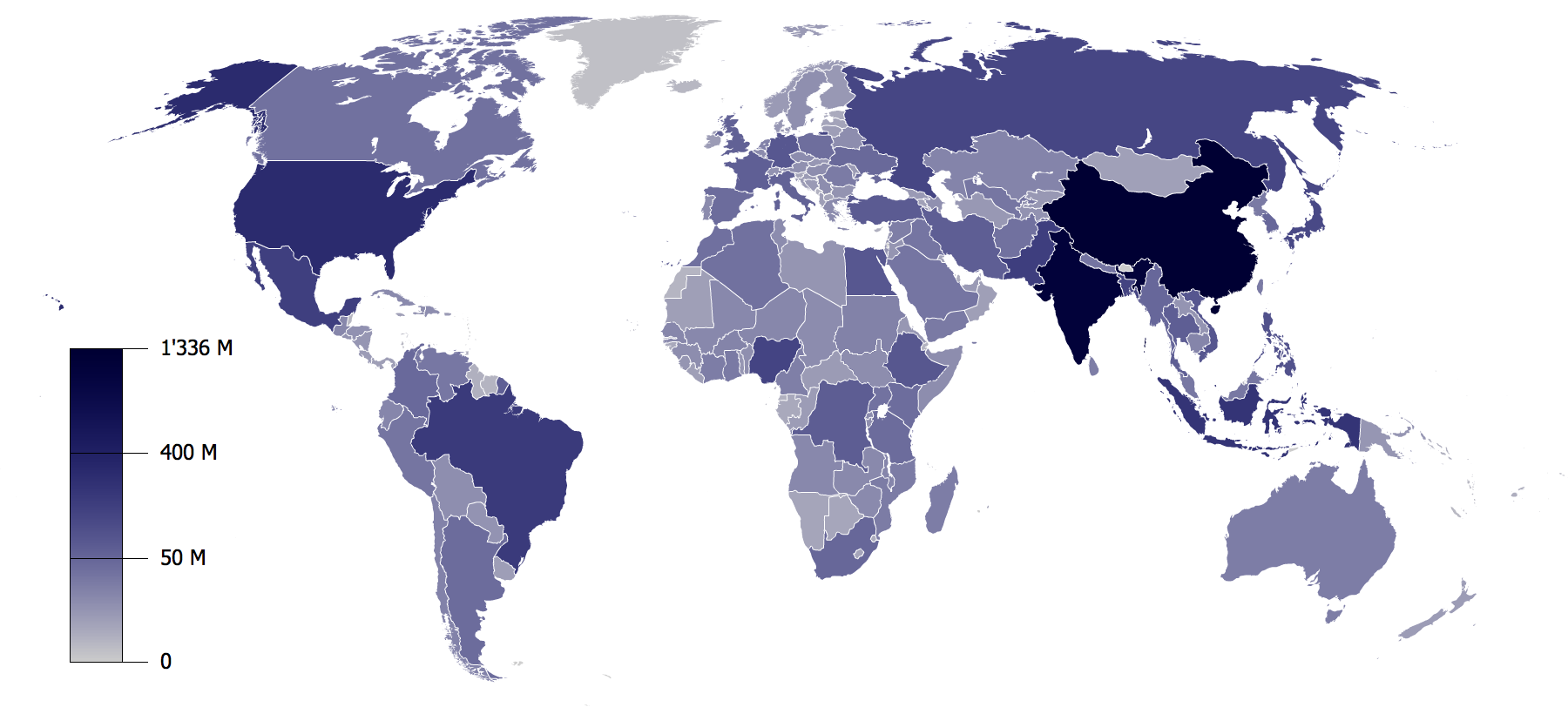
Map of countries by population for the year 2000 (U.N. source)

This is a list of countries by population in 2000. It is a list of all the countries and dependent territories in the world by their estimated population in the year 2000.

Because the table contains data only for the 230 nations and territories existing at the start of 2000, there are no entries for nations that became independent in 2000 or in later years.

This list adopts definitions of "country" on a case-by-case basis. The United Kingdom is considered as a single country while constituent countries of the Kingdom of the Netherlands are regarded separately.

Historical Demographics
Altar of Domitius Ahenobarbus
Articles
Demographic history
Historical demography
World population estimates
List of Countries by Population
1989	2000	2005

Rank	Country/Territory	Population 2000 estimate
–	World population	6,080,671,215
1	China	1,261,832,482
2	India	1,040,000,000
3	United States	275,562,673
4	Indonesia	224,784,210
5	Brazil	172,860,370
6	Russia	146,001,176
7	Pakistan	141,553,775
8	Bangladesh	129,194,224
9	Japan	126,549,976
10	Nigeria	123,337,822
11	Mexico	100,349,766
12	Germany	82,797,408
13	Philippines	81,159,644
14	Vietnam	78,773,873
15	Egypt	68,359,979
16	Turkey	65,666,677
17	Iran	65,619,636
18	Ethiopia	64,117,452
19	Thailand	61,230,874
20	United Kingdom	59,511,464
21	France	59,329,691
22	Italy	57,634,327
23	Democratic Republic of the Congo	51,964,999
24	Ukraine	49,429,800
25	South Korea	47,470,969
26	South Africa	43,421,021
27	Myanmar	41,734,853
28	Spain	39,996,671
29	Colombia	39,685,655
30	Poland	38,646,023
31	Argentina	36,955,182
32	Tanzania	35,306,126
33	Sudan	35,079,814
34	Canada	31,281,092
35	Algeria	31,193,917
36	Kenya	30,339,770
37	Morocco	30,122,350
38	Peru	27,012,899
39	Afghanistan	25,838,797
40	Uzbekistan	24,755,519
41	Nepal	24,702,119
42	Venezuela	23,542,649
43	Uganda	23,317,560
44	Iraq	22,675,617
45	Romania	22,411,121
46	Taiwan	22,191,087
47	Saudi Arabia	22,023,506
48	Malaysia	21,793,293
49	North Korea	21,687,550
50	Ghana	19,533,560
51	Sri Lanka	19,238,575
52	Australia	19,169,083
53	Mozambique	19,104,696
54	Madagascar	18,606,000
55	Yemen	17,479,206
56	Kazakhstan	16,733,227
57	Syria	16,305,659
58	Ivory Coast	15,980,950
59	Netherlands	15,892,237
60	Cameroon	15,421,937
61	Chile	15,153,797
62	Ecuador	12,920,092
63	Guatemala	12,639,939
64	Cambodia	12,212,306
65	Burkina Faso	11,946,065
66	Zimbabwe	11,342,521
67	Cuba	11,141,997
68	Mali	10,685,948
69	Greece	10,601,527
70	FR Yugoslavia	10,400,000
71	Malawi	10,385,849
72	Belarus	10,366,719
73	Czech Republic	10,272,179
74	Belgium	10,241,506
75	Angola	10,145,267
76	Hungary	10,138,844
77	Niger	10,075,511
78	Portugal	10,048,232
79	Senegal	9,987,494
80	Tunisia	9,593,402
81	Zambia	9,582,418
82	Sweden	8,873,052
83	Dominican Republic	8,442,533
84	Chad	8,424,504
85	Bolivia	8,152,620
86	Austria	8,131,111
87	Bulgaria	7,796,694
88	Azerbaijan	7,748,163
89	Guinea	7,466,200
90	Switzerland	7,262,372
91	Somalia	7,253,137
92	Rwanda	7,229,129
93	Hong Kong (PR China)	7,116,302
94	Haiti	6,867,995
95	Tajikistan	6,440,732
96	Benin	6,395,919
97	Honduras	6,249,598
98	El Salvador	6,122,515
99	Burundi	6,054,714
100	Israel	5,842,454
101	Paraguay	5,585,828
102	Laos	5,497,459
103	Slovakia	5,407,956
104	Denmark	5,336,394
105	Sierra Leone	5,232,624
106	Finland	5,167,486 (Note: Includes Åland.)
107	Libya	5,115,450
108	Georgia	5,019,538
109	Togo	5,018,502
110	Jordan	4,998,564
111	Papua New Guinea	4,926,984
112	Nicaragua	4,812,569
113	Kyrgyzstan	4,685,230
114	Turkmenistan	4,518,268
115	Norway	4,481,162 (Note: Includes Svalbard and Jan Mayen Island.)
116	Moldova	4,430,654
117	Croatia	4,282,216
118	Singapore	4,151,264
119	Eritrea	4,135,933
120	Puerto Rico (US)	3,915,798
121	Bosnia and Herzegovina	3,835,777
122	New Zealand	3,819,762
123	Ireland	3,797,257
124	Costa Rica	3,710,558
125	Lithuania	3,620,756
126	Lebanon	3,578,036
127	Central African Republic	3,512,751
128	Albania	3,490,435
129	Armenia	3,344,336
130	Uruguay	3,334,074
131	Liberia	3,164,156
132	Palestinian territories	3,152,361 (West Bank 2,020,298, Gaza Strip 1,132,063)
133	Republic of the Congo	2,830,961
134	Panama	2,808,268
135	Mauritania	2,667,859
136	Jamaica	2,652,689
137	Mongolia	2,650,952
138	Oman	2,533,389
139	Latvia	2,404,926
140	United Arab Emirates	2,369,153
141	Bhutan	2,163,000
142	Lesotho	2,143,141
143	Macedonia	2,041,467
144	Kuwait	1,973,572
145	Slovenia	1,927,593
146	Namibia	1,771,327
147	Botswana	1,576,470
148	Estonia	1,431,471
149	The Gambia	1,367,124
150	Guinea-Bissau	1,285,715
152	Gabon	1,208,436
151	Mauritius	1,179,368 (Note: Includes Agalega, Rodrigues and St. Brandon.)
153	Trinidad and Tobago	1,175,523
154	Swaziland	1,083,289
155	(United Nations) East Timor	947,000
156	Fiji	832,494
157	Cyprus	758,363 (Note: Estimated total population of both Greek and Turkish controlled areas.)
158	Qatar	744,483
159	Réunion (France)	720,934
160	Guyana	697,286
161	Bahrain	634,137
162	Comoros	578,400
163	Equatorial Guinea	474,214
164	Solomon Islands	466,194
165	Djibouti	451,442
166	Macau (PR China)	445,594
167	Luxembourg	437,389
168	Suriname	431,303
169	Guadeloupe (France)	426,493
170	Martinique (France)	414,516
171	Cape Verde	401,343
172	Malta	391,670
173	Brunei	336,376
174	Maldives	301,475
175	The Bahamas	294,982
176	Iceland	276,365
177	Barbados	274,540
178	Belize	249,183
179	French Polynesia (France)	249,110
180	Western Sahara	244,943
181	Netherlands Antilles (Netherlands)	210,134
182	New Caledonia (France)	201,816
183	Vanuatu	189,618
184	Samoa	179,466
185	French Guiana (France)	172,605
186	São Tomé and Príncipe	159,883
187	Saint Lucia	156,260
188	Mayotte (France)	155,911
189	Guam (US)	154,623
190	Channel Islands (UK)	149,000
191	Federated States of Micronesia	133,144
192	U.S. Virgin Islands (US)	120,917
193	Saint Vincent and the Grenadines	115,461
194	Tonga	102,321
195	Kiribati	91,985
196	Grenada	89,018
197	Seychelles	79,326
198	Isle of Man (UK)	73,117
199	Northern Mariana Islands (US)	71,912
200	Dominica	71,540
201	Aruba (Netherlands)	69,539
202	Marshall Islands	68,126
203	Andorra	66,824
204	Antigua and Barbuda	66,422
205	American Samoa (US)	65,446
206	Bermuda (UK)	62,997
207	Greenland (Denmark)	56,309
208	Faroe Islands (Denmark)	45,296
209	Saint Kitts and Nevis	38,819
210	Cayman Islands (UK)	34,763
211	Liechtenstein	32,207
212	Monaco	31,693
213	Gibraltar (UK)	29,481
214	San Marino	26,937
215	Cook Islands (Self-governing in free association with New Zealand)	20,407
216	British Virgin Islands (UK)	19,615
217	Palau	18,766
218	Turks and Caicos Islands (UK)	17,502
219	Wallis and Futuna (France)	15,283
220	Nauru	11,845
221	Anguilla (UK)	11,797
222	Tuvalu	10,838
223	Saint Helena (UK)	7,212 (Note: Includes Ascension and Tristan da Cunha.)
224	Saint-Pierre and Miquelon (France)	6,896
225	Montserrat (UK)	6,409
226	Falkland Islands (UK)	2,826
227	Niue (Self-governing in free association with New Zealand)	2,113
228	Tokelau (NZ)	1,458
229	Vatican City	880
230	Pitcairn Islands (UK)	54

== See also ==
- List of countries
- List of countries by area
- List of countries by past and future population
- List of countries by population
- List of countries by population in 1900
- List of countries by population in 2005
- List of countries by population in 2010
- List of continents by population
- List of religious populations
- World population
- Human geography
