= List of countries by population in 2005 =

Historical Demographics
Altar of Domitius Ahenobarbus
Articles
Demographic history
Historical demography
World population estimates
List of Countries by Population
2000	2005	2010

This is a list of sovereign states and other territories by population, with population figures estimated for 1 July 2005 (rounded to the nearest 1,000). The figures are estimates for the year 2005 from the U.N. World Population Prospects (2004 revision) using the medium fertility variant.

The list includes all sovereign states and dependent territories recognized by the United Nations, plus the territory under the effective control of the Republic of China (Taiwan).

This list adopts definitions of "country" on a case-by-case basis. The "United Kingdom" is considered as a single country while constituent countries of the Kingdom of the Netherlands are regarded separately.

Rank	Country / Territory	Population July 2005 UN estimate	Change from 2000*
—	World	6,464,750,000	Steady
1	China	1,307,593,000	Steady
2	India	1,103,371,000	Steady
3	United States	295,520,000	Steady
4	Indonesia	222,781,000	Steady
5	Brazil	186,405,000	Steady
6	Pakistan	157,935,000	▲1
7	Russia	143,202,000	▼1
8	Bangladesh	141,822,000	Steady
9	Nigeria	131,530,000	▲1
10	Japan	128,085,000	▼1
11	Mexico	107,029,000	Steady
12	Philippines	85,599,000	▲2
13	Vietnam	84,238,000	▲1
14	Germany	82,689,000	▼2
15	Ethiopia	77,431,000	▲1
16	Egypt	74,033,000	▼1
17	Turkey	73,193,000	▲1
18	Iran	69,515,000	▼1
19	France	65,446,000	▲1
20	Thailand	64,233,000	▼1
21	United Kingdom	59,668,000	Steady
22	Italy	58,093,000	Steady
23	Democratic Republic of the Congo	57,549,000	Steady
24	Myanmar	50,519,000	Steady
25	South Korea	50,000,000	▲1
26	South Africa	48,432,000	▲1
27	Ukraine	46,481,000	▼2
28	Colombia	45,600,000	Steady
29	Spain	43,064,000	Steady
30	Argentina	38,747,000	Steady
31	Poland	38,530,000	Steady
32	Tanzania	38,329,000	Steady
33	Sudan	36,233,000	Steady
34	Kenya	34,256,000	Steady
35	Algeria	32,854,000	Steady
36	Canada	32,268,000	Steady
37	Morocco	31,478,000	Steady
38	Afghanistan	29,863,000	Steady
39	Uganda	28,816,000	Steady
40	Iraq	28,807,000	Steady
41	Peru	27,968,000	Steady
42	Nepal	27,133,000	Steady
43	Venezuela	26,749,000	Steady
44	Uzbekistan	26,593,000	Steady
45	Malaysia	25,347,000	Steady
46	Saudi Arabia	24,573,000	Steady
47	North Korea	22,894,384	Steady
48	Taiwan	22,488,000	Steady
49	Ghana	22,113,000	Steady
50	Romania	21,711,000	Steady
51	Yemen	20,975,000	▲1
52	Sri Lanka	20,743,000	▲1
53	Australia	20,155,000	▼2
54	Syria	19,792,000	Steady
55	Mozambique	19,043,000	Steady
56	Madagascar	18,606,000	Steady
57	Côte d'Ivoire	18,154,000	Steady
58	Cameroon	16,322,000	Steady
59	Netherlands	16,299,000	Steady
60	Chile	16,295,000	Steady
61	Angola	15,941,000	Steady
62	Kazakhstan	14,825,000	Steady
63	Cambodia	14,071,000	Steady
64	Niger	13,957,000	Steady
65	Mali	13,518,000	Steady
66	Ecuador	13,228,000	Steady
67	Burkina Faso	13,228,000	Steady
68	Zimbabwe	13,010,000	Steady
69	Guatemala	12,884,000	Steady
70	Malawi	12,599,000	Steady
71	Zambia	11,668,000	Steady
72	Senegal	11,658,000	Steady
73	Cuba	11,269,000	Steady
74	Greece	11,120,000	Steady
75	Belgium	10,495,000	Steady
76	Portugal	10,419,000	Steady
77	Czech Republic	10,220,000	Steady
78	Tunisia	10,102,000	Steady
79	Hungary	10,098,000	Steady
80	Serbia	9,778,991	Steady
81	Chad	9,755,000	Steady
82	Belarus	9,749,000	Steady
83	Guinea	9,402,000	Steady
84	Bolivia	9,182,000	Steady
85	Sweden	9,041,000	Steady
86	Rwanda	9,038,000	Steady
87	Dominican Republic	8,895,000	Steady
88	Haiti	8,528,000	Steady
89	Benin	8,439,000	Steady
90	Azerbaijan	8,411,000	Steady
91	Somalia	8,228,000	Steady
92	Austria	8,189,000	Steady
93	Bulgaria	7,726,000	Steady
94	Burundi	7,548,000	Steady
95	Switzerland	7,252,000	Steady
96	Honduras	7,205,000	Steady
97	Hong Kong (PR China)	7,041,000	Steady
98	El Salvador	6,881,000	Steady
99	Israel	6,725,000	Steady
100	Tajikistan	6,507,000	Steady
101	Paraguay	6,158,000	Steady
102	Togo	6,145,000	Steady
103	Laos	5,924,000	Steady
104	Papua New Guinea	5,887,000	Steady
105	Libya	5,853,000	Steady
106	Jordan	5,703,000	Steady
107	Tibet (PR China)	5,700,000	Steady
108	Sierra Leone	5,525,000	Steady
109	Nicaragua	5,487,000	Steady
110	Denmark	5,431,000	Steady
111	Slovakia	5,401,000	Steady
112	Kyrgyzstan	5,264,000	Steady
113	Finland	5,249,000	Steady
114	Turkmenistan	4,833,000	Steady
115	Norway	4,620,000	Steady
116	Croatia	4,551,000	Steady
117	United Arab Emirates	4,496,000	Steady
118	Georgia	4,474,000	Steady
119	Eritrea	4,401,000	Steady
120	Costa Rica	4,327,000	Steady
121	Singapore	4,326,000	Steady
122	Moldova	4,206,000	Steady
123	Ireland	4,148,000	Steady
123	Central African Republic	4,038,000	Steady
124	New Zealand	4,028,000	Steady
125	Republic of the Congo	3,999,000	Steady
126	Puerto Rico (US)	3,955,000	Steady
127	Bosnia and Herzegovina	3,907,000	Steady
128	Palestinian territories	3,702,000	Steady
129	Lebanon	3,577,000	Steady
130	Uruguay	3,463,000	Steady
131	Lithuania	3,431,000	Steady
132	Liberia	3,283,000	Steady
133	Panama	3,232,000	Steady
134	Albania	3,130,000	Steady
135	Mauritania	3,069,000	Steady
136	Armenia	3,016,000	Steady
137	Kuwait	2,687,000	Steady
138	Jamaica	2,651,000	Steady
139	Mongolia	2,646,000	Steady
140	Oman	2,567,000	Steady
141	Latvia	2,307,000	Steady
142	Bhutan	2,163,000	Steady
143	Republic of Macedonia	2,034,000	Steady
144	Namibia	2,031,000	Steady
145	Slovenia	1,967,000	Steady
146	Lesotho	1,795,000	Steady
147	Botswana	1,765,000	Steady
148	Guinea-Bissau	1,586,000	Steady
149	The Gambia	1,517,000	Steady
150	Gabon	1,384,000	Steady
151	Estonia	1,330,000	Steady
152	Trinidad and Tobago	1,305,000	Steady
153	Mauritius	1,245,000	Steady
154	Swaziland	1,032,000	Steady
155	East Timor	947,000	Steady
156	Fiji	848,000	Steady
157	Cyprus	835,000	Steady
158	Qatar	813,000	Steady
159	Comoros	798,000	Steady
160	Djibouti	793,000	Steady
161	Réunion (France)	785,000	Steady
162	Guyana	751,000	Steady
163	Bahrain	727,000	Steady
164	Montenegro	620,145	Steady
165	Cape Verde	507,000	Steady
166	Equatorial Guinea	504,000	Steady
167	Solomon Islands	478,000	Steady
168	Luxembourg	465,000	Steady
169	Macau (PR China)	460,000	Steady
170	Suriname	449,000	Steady
171	Guadeloupe (France)	448,000	Steady
172	Malta	402,000	Steady
173	Martinique (France)	396,000	Steady
174	Brunei	374,000	Steady
175	Western Sahara	341,000	Steady
176	Maldives	329,000	Steady
177	The Bahamas	323,000	Steady
178	Iceland	295,000	Steady
179	Belize	270,000	Steady
180	Barbados	270,000	Steady
181	French Polynesia (France)	257,000	Steady
182	New Caledonia (France)	237,000	Steady
183	Vanuatu	211,000	Steady
184	French Guiana (France)	187,000	Steady
185	Samoa	185,000	Steady
186	Netherlands Antilles (Netherlands)	183,000	Steady
187	Guam (US)	170,000	Steady
188	Saint Lucia	161,000	Steady
189	São Tomé and Príncipe	157,000	Steady
190	Channel Islands (UK)	149,000	Steady
191	Saint Vincent and the Grenadines	119,000	Steady
192	U.S. Virgin Islands (US)	112,000	Steady
193	Federated States of Micronesia	110,000	Steady
194	Grenada	103,000	Steady
195	Tonga	102,000	Steady
196	Aruba (Netherlands)	99,000	Steady
197	Kiribati	99,000	Steady
198	Antigua and Barbuda	81,000	Steady
199	Northern Mariana Islands (US)	81,000	Steady
200	Seychelles	81,000	Steady
201	Dominica	79,000	Steady
202	Isle of Man	77,000	Steady
203	Andorra	67,000	Steady
204	American Samoa (US)	65,000	Steady
205	Bermuda (UK)	64,000	Steady
206	Marshall Islands	62,000	Steady
207	Greenland (Denmark)	57,000	Steady
208	Faroe Islands (Denmark)	47,000	Steady
209	Cayman Islands (UK)	45,000	Steady
210	Saint Kitts and Nevis	43,000	Steady
211	Monaco	35,000	Steady
212	Liechtenstein	35,000	Steady
213	San Marino	28,000	Steady
214	Gibraltar (UK)	28,000	Steady
215	Turks and Caicos Islands (UK)	26,000	Steady
216	British Virgin Islands (UK)	22,000	Steady
217	Palau	20,000	Steady
218	Cook Islands (NZ)	18,000	Steady
219	Wallis and Futuna (France)	15,000	Steady
220	Nauru	14,000	Steady
221	Anguilla (UK)	12,000	Steady
222	Tuvalu	10,000	Steady
223	Saint-Pierre and Miquelon (France)	6,000	Steady
224	Saint Helena (UK)	5,000	Steady
225	Montserrat (UK)	4,000	Steady
226	Falkland Islands (UK)	3,000	Steady
227	Niue (NZ)	1,000	Steady
228	Tokelau (NZ)	1,000	Steady
229	Vatican City	783	Steady
230	Pitcairn Islands (UK)	67	Steady

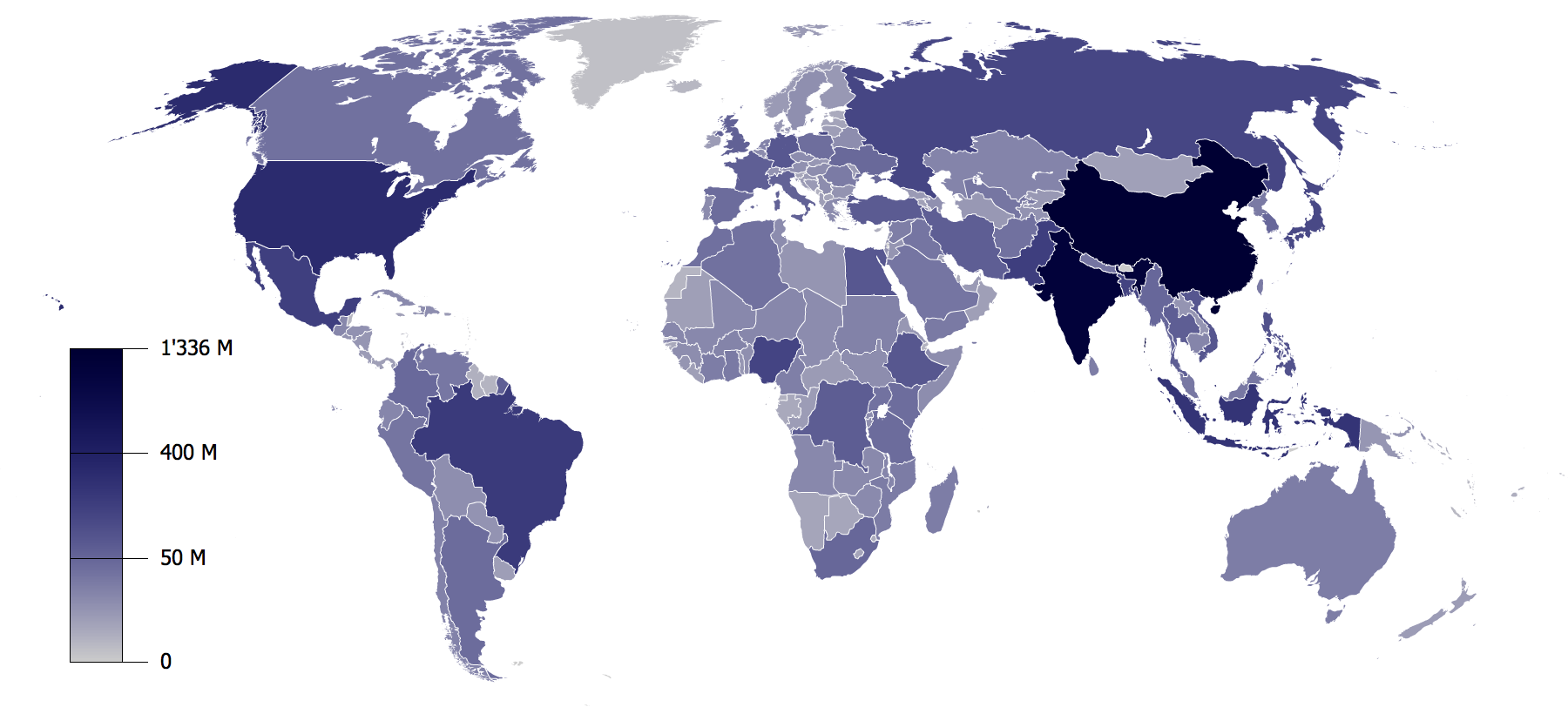
Map of countries by population for the year 2005 (U.N. source)

== See also ==
- List of countries
- List of countries by area
- List of countries by past and future population
- List of countries by population
- List of countries by population in 1900
- List of countries by population in 2000
- List of countries by population in 2010
- List of continents by population
- List of religious populations
- World population
- Human geography
