= List of countries by population in 2010 =

Historical demographics
Scene during a census
Articles
Demographic history
Historical demography
World population estimates
List of Countries by Population
2005	2010	2015

Political world map in 2010

This is a list of sovereign states and other territories by population, with population figures estimated for 2010 (rounded to the nearest 1,000). The figures are estimates for the Organization for Economic Cooperation and Development (OECD) "2010 annual statistics", which lists countries and territories with population over 100,000.

Some figures for population density and for area have not yet been added to the table.

The list includes all sovereign states and dependent territories recognized by the United Nations plus the territory under the effective control of the Republic of China (Taiwan).

This list adopts definitions of "country" on a case-by-case basis. The United Kingdom is considered as a single country while constituent countries of the Kingdom of the Netherlands are regarded separately.

Rank	Country / territory	Population 2010 (OECD estimate)	Change from 2005*	Area (km^{2})	Population density (people per km^{2})
—	World	6,843,522,711	Steady		
1	China	1,339,724,852	Steady	9,596,961	140
2	India	1,182,105,564	Steady	3,287,263	360
3	United States	309,349,689	Steady	9,833,520	31
4	Indonesia	237,641,326	Steady	1,904,569	125
5	Brazil	193,252,604	Steady	8,515,767	23
6	Pakistan	173,510,000	Steady	881,913	197
7	Nigeria	158,258,917	▲2	923,768	171
8	Bangladesh	148,600,000	Steady	147,570	1007
9	Russia	142,849,472	▼2	17,075,200	8
10	Japan	128,056,000	Steady	377,972	339
11	Mexico	112,336,538	Steady	1,972,550	57
12	Philippines	92,337,852	Steady	343,448	269
13	Vietnam	86,932,500	▼1	331,230.8	262
14	Ethiopia	83,483,000	▲1	1,104,300	76
15	Germany	81,802,257	▼1	357,168	229
16	Egypt	78,728,000	Steady	1,010,408	78
17	Iran	74,733,230	▲1	1,648,195	45
18	Turkey	73,722,988	▼1	783,356	94
19	Democratic Republic of the Congo	67,827,496	▲4	2,345,409	29
20	Thailand	63,878,267	Steady	513,120	124
21	France	62,791,013	▼2	640,679	98
22	United Kingdom	62,026,962	▼1	242,495	256
23	Italy	60,340,328	▼1	301,338	200
24	Myanmar	59,780,000	Steady	676,578	198
25	South Africa	49,991,300	▲1	1,221,037	41
26	South Korea	49,410,366	▼1	100,210	493
27	Spain	45,989,016	▲2	505,990	91
28	Ukraine	45,782,592	▼1	603,628	76
29	Colombia	45,508,205	▲1	1,141,748	40
30	Tanzania	43,187,823	▲2	947,303	46
31	Sudan	42,338,426	▲2	1,886,068	22
32	Kenya	40,862,900	▲2	580,367	70
33	Argentina	40,518,951	▼3	2,780,400	15
34	Poland	38,167,329	▼3	312,679	122
35	Algeria	35,978,000	Steady	2,381,741	15
36	Canada	34,108,752	Steady	9,984,670	3
37	Iraq	32,481,000	▲3	437,072	74
38	Morocco	31,894,000	▼1	710,850	45
39	Uganda	31,784,600	Steady	241,038	132
40	Peru	29,461,933	▲1	1,285,216	0
41	Venezuela	28,833,845	▲2	716,445	0
42	Malaysia	28,334,135	▲3	330,803	0
43	Nepal	28,043,744	▼1	147,181	0
44	Uzbekistan	28,001,400	Steady	448,978	0
45	Saudi Arabia	27,136,977	▲1	2,149,690	0
46	Afghanistan	24,485,600	▼8	652,864	0
47	North Korea	24,325,701	Steady	120,540	0
48	Ghana	24,223,431	▲1	239,567	0
49	Taiwan	23,162,120	▼1	36,197	0
50	Yemen	23,153,982	▲1	527,968	0
51	Mozambique	22,416,881	▲4	801,590	0
52	Australia	22,299,800	▲1	7,692,024	0
53	Cote d'Ivoire	21,570,746	▲4	322,463	0
54	Romania	21,462,186	▼4	238,397	0
55	Sri Lanka	20,653,000	▼3	65,610	0
56	Syria	20,619,000	▼2	185,180	0
57	Madagascar	20,146,442	▼1	587,041	0
58	Cameroon	19,958,352	Steady	475,442	0
59	Angola	18,992,708	▲2	1,246,700	0
60	Chile	17,094,270	Steady	756,096	0
61	Netherlands	16,574,989	▼2	41,543	0
62	Kazakhstan	16,442,000	Steady	2,724,900	0
63	Burkina Faso	15,730,977	▲4	274,200	0
64	Mali	15,370,000	▲1	1,240,192	0
65	Niger	15,203,822	▼1	1,267,000	0
66	Ecuador	14,483,499	Steady	283,561	0
67	Guatemala	14,361,666	▲2	108,889	0
68	Cambodia	14,302,779	▼5	181,035	0
69	Malawi	13,947,592	▲1	118,484	0
70	Zambia	13,257,269	▼1	752,618	0
71	Zimbabwe	12,644,041	▼3	390,757	0
72	Senegal	12,509,434	Steady	196,712	0
73	Chad	11,714,904	▲8	1,284,000	0
74	Greece	11,305,118	Steady	131,957	0
75	Cuba	11,241,161	▼2	109,884	0
76	Belgium	10,839,905	▼1	30,528	0
77	Portugal	10,637,713	▲1	92,212	0
78	Tunisia	10,547,100	Steady	163,610	0
79	Czechia	10,506,813	▼2	78,866	0
80	Bolivia	10,426,154	▲4	1,098,581	0
81	Rwanda	10,412,820	▲5	26,338	0
82	Guinea	10,323,755	▲1	245,836	0
83	Hungary	10,014,324	▼4	93,030	0
84	Dominican Republic	9,884,371	▲3	48,315	0
85	Haiti	9,855,000	▲3	27,750	0
86	Belarus	9,480,178	▼4	207,595	0
87	Somalia	9,358,602	▲4	637,657	0
88	Sweden	9,340,682	▼3	450,295	0
89	Benin	9,211,741	Steady	114,763	0
90	Azerbaijan	8,997,586	Steady	86,600	0
91	Burundi	8,518,862	▲3	27,834	0
92	Austria	8,375,290	Steady	83,879	0
93	United Arab Emirates	8,264,070	▲24	83,600	0
94	Honduras	8,045,990	▲2	112,492	0
95	Switzerland	7,785,806	Steady	41,285	0
96	Israel	7,623,600	▲3	22,072	0
97	Tajikistan	7,616,400	▲3	143,100	0
98	Bulgaria	7,563,710	▼5	110,993.6	0
99	Serbia	7,291,436	▼19	77,474	0
100	Hong Kong	7,024,200	▼3	2,755	0
101	Papua New Guinea	6,744,955	▲3	462,840	0
102	Libya	6,545,619	▲3	1,759,541	0
103	Paraguay	6,459,727	▼2	406,752	0
104	Laos	6,230,200	▼1	237,955	0
105	El Salvador	6,194,126	▼7	21,041	0
106	Togo	6,191,155	▼4	56,785	0
107	Jordan	6,113,000	▼1	89,341	0
108	Sierra Leone	5,835,664	Steady	71,740	0
109	Nicaragua	5,822,265	Steady	130,375	0
110	Denmark	5,534,738	Steady	42,931	0
111	Turkmenistan	5,479,800	▲3	491,210	0
112	Slovakia	5,424,925	▼1	49,035	0
113	Kyrgyzstan	5,418,300	▼1	199,951	0
114	Finland	5,351,427	▲1	338,424	0
115	Eritrea	5,223,994	▲4	117,600	0
116	Singapore	5,076,700	▲5	721.5	7036
117	Norway	4,858,199	▼2	385,203	0
118	Costa Rica	4,563,539	▲2	51,180	0
119	Central African Republic	4,505,945	▲4	622,984	0
120	Ireland	4,467,854	▲3	70,273	0
121	Georgia	4,436,391	▼3	69,700	0
122	Croatia	4,425,747	▼6	56,594	0
123	New Zealand	4,367,800	▲1	268,021	0
124	Liberia	4,101,767	▲8	111,369	0
125	Palestine	4,048,403	▲3	6,020	0
126	Bosnia and Herzegovina	3,844,046	▲1	51,129	0
127	Lebanon	3,785,655	▲2	10,452	0
128	Republic of the Congo	3,758,678	▼3	342,000	0
129	Puerto Rico	3,721,978	▼3	9,104	0
130	Kuwait	3,566,437	▲7	17,818	0
131	Moldova	3,563,695		33,846	0
132	Panama	3,504,483		75,417	0
133	Uruguay	3,356,584		176,215	0
134	Lithuania	3,329,039		65,300	0
135	Armenia	3,249,482		29,743	0
136	Mauritania	3,217,383		1,030,000	0
137	Albania	3,195,000		28,748	0
138	Mongolia	2,780,800		1,566,000	0
139	Oman	2,773,479		309,500	0
140	Jamaica	2,701,200		10,991	0
141	Latvia	2,248,374		64,589	0
142	Namibia	2,212,037		825,615	0
143	Kosovo	2,208,107		10,908	0
144	Macedonia	2,052,722		25,713	0
145	Slovenia	2,046,976		20,273	0
146	Botswana	2,029,307		581,730	0
147	Lesotho	1,891,830		30,355	0
148	Gambia	1,750,732		10,689	0
149	Qatar	1,699,435		11,581	0
150	Guinea-Bissau	1,647,380		36,125	0
151	Gabon	1,501,266		267,667	0
152	Estonia	1,340,127		45,227	0
153	Trinidad and Tobago	1,317,714		5,131	0
154	Equatorial Guinea	1,313,000		28,050	0
155	Mauritius	1,283,415		2,040	0
156	Bahrain	1,234,571		765.3	0
157	Timor-Leste	1,149,028			0
158	Cyprus	1,102,677			0
159	Swaziland	1,055,506			0
160	Djibouti	879,053			0
161	Fiji	850,700			0
162	Réunion	828,054			0
163	Guyana	761,442			0
164	Bhutan	695,822			0
165	Comoros	675,000			0
166	Montenegro	616,411			0
167	Macau	552,300			0
168	Suriname	531,170			0
169	Solomon Islands	530,669			0
170	Western Sahara	530,000			0
171	Cape Verde	512,582			0
172	Luxembourg	502,066			0
173	Brunei	414,400			0
174	Malta	414,372			0
175	Guadeloupe	404,394			0
176	Martinique	399,637			0
177	Bahamas	353,658			0
178	Maldives	319,738			0
179	Iceland	317,630			0
180	Belize	312,971			0
181	Barbados	276,300			0
182	French Polynesia	267,000			0
183	New Caledonia	248,000			0
184	Vanuatu	245,036			0
185	French Guiana	232,223			0
186	Mayotte	202,000			0
187	Samoa	183,123			0
188	Guam	180,865			0
189	Saint Lucia	174,000			0
190	São Tomé and Príncipe	165,397			0
191	Curacao	142,180			0
192	Grenada	109,553			0
193	Saint Vincent and the Grenadines	109,284			0
194	U.S. Virgin Islands	106,267			0
195	Tonga	103,365			0
196	Micronesia	102,624			0
197	Aruba	101,484			0
198	Kiribati	100,835			0

* Change in position from 2005
