= List of continents and continental subregions by population =

This is a list of continental landmasses, continents, and continental subregions by population. For statistical convenience, the populations of continental landmasses also include the populations of their associated islands.

World population by continent, 2021
1. Asia (59.4%)
2. Africa (17.6%)
3. Europe (9.40%)
4. North America (7.50%)
5. South America (5.50%)
6. Oceania (0.60%)
7. Antarctica (0.00%)

== Distribution of populations by continental landmass ==
Continental landmass	Population (2021)	% (world)	±% p.a. (2010–2013)	Sovereign states (2025)	De facto states (2025)	Non-self-governing territories (2025)	Other area(s) (2025)
World	7,909,295,151	100%	1.17%	197	8	17	34
Afro-Eurasia	6,833,426,385	86.4%	1.25%	146	8	3	12
America	1,030,037,584	13%	0.96%	35	0	8	14
Oceania (Note: Comprising Australasia (mainland Australia, New Zealand, and Tasmania), Melanesia (the Aru Islands, Island Melanesia, and New Guinea), Micronesia, and Polynesia.)	44,491,724	0.6%	1.47%	16	0	6	7
Antarctica	0	0%	0%	0	0	0	1

== Distribution of populations by continent ==
Continent	Population (2021)	% (world)	±% p.a. (2010–2013)	Sovereign states (2025)	De facto states (2025)	Non-self-governing territory(ies) (2025)	Other area(s) (2025)
World	7,909,295,151	100%	1.17%	197	8	17	34
Asia	4,694,576,167	59.4%	1.04%	48	4	0	2
Africa	1,393,676,444	17.6%	2.57%	54	2	2	4
Europe	745,173,774	9.4%	0.08%	44	2	1	6
North America	595,783,465	7.5%	0.96%	23	0	7	11
South America	434,254,119	5.5%	1.06%	12	0	1	3
Oceania (Note: Comprising the continent of Australia-New Guinea (the Aru Islands, Australia, the mainland regions of Papua New Guinea, and Western New Guinea), the East Melanesian Islands (the Islands Region of Papua New Guinea, Solomon Islands, and Vanuatu), Fiji, Micronesia, Polynesia, and the submerged continent of Zealandia (New Caledonia, New Zealand, and Norfolk Island).)	44,491,724	0.6%	1.47%	16	0	6	7
Antarctica	0	0%	0%	0	0	0	1

== Distribution of populations by continental subregion ==
Continental subregion	Population (2021)	% (world)	±% p.a. (2010–2013)	Sovereign states (2025)	De facto state(s) (2025)	Non-self-governing territory(ies) (2025)	Other area(s) (2025)
World	7,909,295,151	100%	1.17%	197	8	17	34
Southern Asia (Note: The UN geoscheme includes Afghanistan and Iran in Southern Asia.)	1,989,452,478	25.2%	1.32%	9	0	0	0
Eastern Asia	1,663,696,923	21.0%	0.57%	5	1	0	2
Sub-Saharan Africa (Note: Consisting of Eastern Africa, Middle Africa, Southern Africa, and Western Africa.)	1,137,938,708	14.4%	N/A	48	1	1	4
South-eastern Asia	675,796,065	8.5%	1.20%	11	0	0	0
Latin America and the Caribbean (Note: Consisting of the Caribbean, Central America, and South America.)	656,098,097	8.30%	N/A	33	0	7	12
Eastern Africa (Note: The UN geoscheme includes the British Indian Ocean Territory (Chagos Archipelago), the Comoros, the French Southern Territories, Madagascar, Malawi, Mauritius, Mayotte, Mozambique, Réunion, Zambia, and Zimbabwe in Eastern Africa.)	461,141,845	5.8%	2.89%	18	1	0	4
South America (Note: The UN geoscheme includes Bouvet Island in South America.)	434,254,119	5.5%	1.06%	12	0	1	3
Western Africa (Note: The UN geoscheme includes Saint Helena, Ascension and Tristan da Cunha in Western Africa.)	418,544,337	5.3%	2.78%	16	0	1	0
Northern America	375,278,947	4.7%	0.85%	2	0	1	2
Eastern Europe (Note: The UN geoscheme includes Bulgaria, Czechia, Hungary, Poland, Romania, and Slovakia, as well as Siberia (Northern Asia) in Eastern Europe.)	291,464,162	3.7%	0.23%	10	1	0	0
Western Asia (Note: The UN geoscheme includes the South Caucasian countries of Armenia, Azerbaijan, and Georgia, as well as Cyprus and Turkey in Western Asia.)	289,733,123	3.7%	1.98%	18	3	0	0
Northern Africa (Note: The UN geoscheme includes Western Sahara in Northern Africa.)	255,737,736	3.2%	1.70%	6	1	1	0
Western Europe (Note: The UN geoscheme includes the DACH countries and Liechtenstein in Western Europe.)	195,381,649	2.5%	0.25%	9	0	0	0
Middle Africa (Note: The UN geoscheme includes Angola in Middle Africa.)	190,267,973	2.4%	2.79%	9	0	0	0
Central America (Note: The UN geoscheme includes Mexico in Central America.)	177,661,929	2.2%	1.40%	8	0	0	0
Southern Europe	152,130,606	1.9%	0.24%	15	1	1	0
Northern Europe (Note: The UN geoscheme includes the Baltic states, the British Isles, and the Channel Islands in Northern Europe.)	106,197,357	1.3%	0.54%	10	0	0	6
Central Asia	75,897,577	1.0%	1.43%	5	0	0	0
Southern Africa	67,984,554	0.9%	0.91%	5	0	0	0
Caribbean	44,182,048	0.6%	0.71%	13	0	6	9
Australia and New Zealand (Note: The UN geoscheme includes Heard Island and McDonald Islands in Australia and New Zealand.)	31,050,816	0.4%	N/A	2	0	0	4
Melanesia (Note: The UN geoscheme includes Papua New Guinea in Melanesia.)	12,188,834	0.2%	N/A	4	0	1	0
Polynesia	717,467	0.009%	N/A	5	0	4	1
Micronesia (Note: The UN geoscheme includes the United States Minor Outlying Islands in Micronesia.)	534,606	0.007%	N/A	5	0	1	2
Antarctica	0	0%	0%	0	0	0	1

== Global, continental, and subregional totals from 1950 to 2021 ==
=== Africa ===
Eastern Africa
Year	Pop.	±% p.a.
1950	66,923,000	—
1960	84,305,000	+2.34%
1970	110,428,000	+2.74%
1980	147,512,000	+2.94%
1990	198,232,000	+3.00%
2000	259,373,000	+2.72%
2010	342,743,000	+2.83%
2021	461,141,845	+2.73%

Middle Africa
Year	Pop.	±% p.a.
1950	26,401,000	—
1960	32,216,000	+2.01%
1970	40,846,000	+2.40%
1980	53,135,000	+2.67%
1990	70,886,000	+2.92%
2000	96,113,000	+3.09%
2010	130,598,000	+3.11%
2021	190,267,973	+3.48%

Northern Africa
Year	Pop.	±% p.a.
1950	49,222,000	—
1960	63,697,000	+2.61%
1970	82,883,000	+2.67%
1980	106,908,000	+2.58%
1990	140,117,000	+2.74%
2000	171,891,000	+2.06%
2010	203,717,000	+1.71%
2021	255,737,736	+2.09%

Southern Africa
Year	Pop.	±% p.a.
1950	15,588,000	—
1960	19,724,000	+2.38%
1970	25,454,000	+2.58%
1980	32,997,000	+2.63%
1990	42,049,000	+2.45%
2000	51,451,000	+2.04%
2010	59,067,000	+1.39%
2021	67,984,554	+1.29%

Western Africa
Year	Pop.	±% p.a.
1950	70,769,000	—
1960	84,946,000	+1.84%
1970	106,015,000	+2.24%
1980	137,414,000	+2.63%
1990	180,331,000	+2.76%
2000	235,235,000	+2.69%
2010	307,982,000	+2.73%
2021	418,544,337	+2.83%

Total Africa
Year	Pop.	±% p.a.
1950	228,902,000	—
1960	284,887,000	+2.21%
1970	365,626,000	+2.53%
1980	477,965,000	+2.72%
1990	631,614,000	+2.83%
2000	814,063,000	+2.57%
2010	1,044,107,000	+2.52%
2021	1,393,676,444	+2.66%

=== Americas ===
Total Americas
Year	Pop.	±% p.a.
1950	340,459,000	—
1960	425,357,000	+2.25%
1970	519,522,000	+2.02%
1980	619,252,000	+1.77%
1990	727,522,000	+1.62%
2000	840,614,000	+1.46%
2010	943,952,000	+1.17%
2021	1,031,377,044	+0.81%

==== North America ====
Caribbean
Year	Pop.	±% p.a.
1950	17,076,000	—
1960	20,724,000	+1.96%
1970	25,306,000	+2.02%
1980	29,748,000	+1.63%
1990	34,198,000	+1.40%
2000	38,314,000	+1.14%
2010	41,621,000	+0.83%
2021	44,182,048	+0.54%

Central America
Year	Pop.	±% p.a.
1950	38,029,000	—
1960	51,400,000	+3.06%
1970	69,702,000	+3.09%
1980	92,425,000	+2.86%
1990	114,823,000	+2.19%
2000	138,780,000	+1.91%
2010	161,117,000	+1.50%
2021	177,661,929	+0.89%

Northern America
Year	Pop.	±% p.a.
1950	171,615,000	—
1960	204,167,000	+1.75%
1970	231,029,000	+1.24%
1980	254,217,000	+0.96%
1990	280,633,000	+0.99%
2000	313,724,000	+1.12%
2010	344,129,000	+0.93%
2021	375,278,947	+0.79%

Total North America
Year	Pop.	±% p.a.
1950	226,719,000	—
1960	276,291,000	+2.00%
1970	326,036,000	+1.67%
1980	376,390,000	+1.45%
1990	429,653,000	+1.33%
2000	490,818,000	+1.34%
2010	546,867,000	+1.09%
2021	597,122,924	+0.80%

==== South America ====
Total South America
Year	Pop.	±% p.a.
1950	113,739,000	—
1960	149,066,000	+2.74%
1970	193,486,000	+2.64%
1980	242,862,000	+2.30%
1990	297,869,000	+2.06%
2000	349,796,000	+1.62%
2010	397,085,000	+1.28%
2021	434,254,119	+0.82%

=== Asia ===
Central Asia
Year	Pop.	±% p.a.
1950	18,131,000	—
1960	24,616,000	+3.10%
1970	33,156,000	+3.02%
1980	41,277,000	+2.21%
1990	50,407,929	+2.02%
2000	55,117,000	+0.90%
2010	62,139,000	+1.21%
2021	75,897,577	+1.83%

Eastern Asia
Year	Pop.	±% p.a.
1950	666,586,000	—
1960	788,145,000	+1.69%
1970	978,113,000	+2.18%
1980	1,173,372,000	+1.84%
1990	1,368,592,000	+1.55%
2000	1,496,284,000	+0.90%
2010	1,575,320,000	+0.52%
2021	1,663,696,923	+0.50%

South-eastern Asia
Year	Pop.	±% p.a.
1950	164,900,000	—
1960	213,838,000	+2.63%
1970	281,521,000	+2.79%
1980	358,106,000	+2.44%
1990	445,665,000	+2.21%
2000	526,179,000	+1.67%
2010	596,708,000	+1.27%
2021	675,796,065	+1.14%

Southern Asia
Year	Pop.	±% p.a.
1950	493,443,000	—
1960	593,943,000	+1.87%
1970	741,603,000	+2.25%
1980	939,043,000	+2.39%
1990	1,189,261,000	+2.39%
2000	1,451,933,000	+2.02%
2010	1,702,969,000	+1.61%
2021	1,989,452,478	+1.42%

Western Asia
Year	Pop.	±% p.a.
1950	50,957,000	—
1960	66,156,000	+2.64%
1970	86,037,000	+2.66%
1980	113,786,000	+2.83%
1990	148,552,000	+2.70%
2000	184,957,000	+2.22%
2010	232,703,000	+2.32%
2021	289,733,123	+2.01%

Total Asia
Year	Pop.	±% p.a.
1950	1,394,018,000	—
1960	1,686,698,000	+1.92%
1970	2,120,430,000	+2.31%
1980	2,625,584,000	+2.16%
1990	3,202,475,000	+2.01%
2000	3,714,470,000	+1.49%
2010	4,169,850,000	+1.16%
2021	4,694,576,167	+1.08%

=== Europe ===
Eastern Europe
Year	Pop.	±% p.a.
1950	220,171,000	—
1960	253,630,000	+1.42%
1970	276,396,000	+0.86%
1980	295,042,000	+0.65%
1990	310,027,000	+0.50%
2000	303,789,000	−0.20%
2010	294,591,000	−0.31%
2021	291,464,162	−0.10%

Northern Europe
Year	Pop.	±% p.a.
1950	78,030,000	—
1960	81,790,000	+0.47%
1970	87,305,000	+0.65%
1980	89,833,000	+0.29%
1990	92,040,000	+0.24%
2000	94,397,000	+0.25%
2010	99,682,000	+0.55%
2021	106,197,357	+0.58%

Southern Europe
Year	Pop.	±% p.a.
1950	108,633,000	—
1960	117,879,000	+0.82%
1970	127,617,000	+0.80%
1980	138,495,000	+0.82%
1990	143,404,000	+0.35%
2000	145,058,000	+0.11%
2010	153,360,000	+0.56%
2021	152,130,606	−0.07%

Western Europe
Year	Pop.	±% p.a.
1950	142,256,000	—
1960	152,320,000	+0.69%
1970	165,903,000	+0.86%
1980	170,489,000	+0.27%
1990	175,615,000	+0.30%
2000	183,163,000	+0.42%
2010	187,762,000	+0.25%
2021	195,381,649	+0.36%

Total Europe
Year	Pop.	±% p.a.
1950	549,089,000	—
1960	605,619,000	+0.98%
1970	657,221,000	+0.82%
1980	693,859,000	+0.54%
1990	721,086,000	+0.39%
2000	726,407,000	+0.07%
2010	735,395,000	+0.12%
2021	745,173,774	+0.12%

=== Oceania ===
Total Oceania
Year	Pop.	±% p.a.
1950	12,682,000	—
1960	15,784,000	+2.21%
1970	19,688,000	+2.23%
1980	22,972,000	+1.55%
1990	26,971,000	+1.62%
2000	31,068,000	+1.42%
2010	36,411,000	+1.60%
2016	39,901,000	+1.54%
2021	44,491,724	+2.20%

=== World ===
Total World
Year	Pop.	±% p.a.
1950	2,525,149,000	—
1960	3,018,344,000	+1.80%
1970	3,682,488,000	+2.01%
1980	4,439,632,000	+1.89%
1990	5,309,668,000	+1.81%
2000	6,126,622,000	+1.44%
2010	6,929,725,000	+1.24%
2021	7,909,295,151	+1.21%

== See also ==
- Human geography
- List of countries and dependencies by area
- List of countries and dependencies by population
- List of countries and dependencies by population density
- List of countries by past and projected future population
- List of countries by population in 1900
- List of countries by population in 2005
- List of countries by population in 2010
- List of population concern organizations
- List of religious populations
- List of sovereign states
- World population

== Sources ==
- All figures come from the 2015 Revision of the United Nations World Population Prospects.
