= Louis Henry (historian) =

French historian

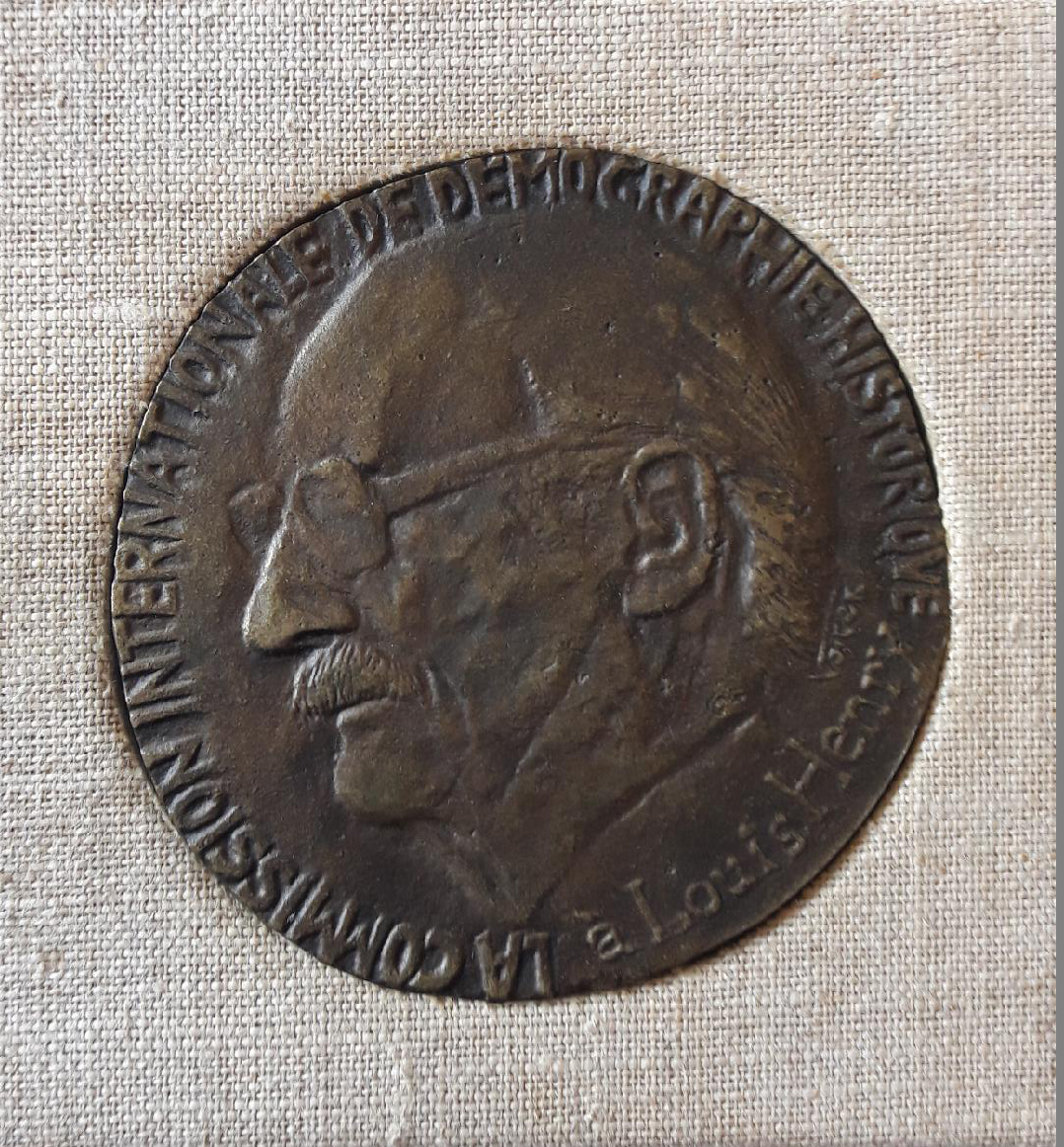
Medal of the International Commission on Historical Demography to Louis Henry

Louis Henry (1911 – 1991) was a French historian. He was the founder of the historical demography and one-place study fields. His 1956 book co-written with Michel Fleury, Des registres paroissiaux à l'histoire de la population. Manuel de dépouillement et d'exploitation de l'état civil ancien laid the foundation for studies in those areas.

Henry proposed that it was possible to reconstruct the population of France from 1670 to 1829. He devised more advanced methods and extracted data from records in order to correct bias and indicate which family histories could be used for different kinds of statistical analyses.

Henry is also responsible for the concept of natural fertility, which guided the way demographers have come to understand the idea of fertility control.

== Biography ==
After graduating from the École polytechnique in 1933 (class of 1931), Louis Henry became an artillery officer. In 1946, he was recruited to the National Institute for Demographic Studies (INED) by its first director, Alfred Sauvy. There, he was “trained in statistics and demography by Paul Vincent.”

Secretary General of the International Union for the Scientific Study of Population (IUSSP) from 1957 to 1961, he taught at the Institute of Demography at the University of Paris (IDUP) and at the School for Advanced Studies in the Social Sciences (EHESS).

For a long time, he wrote various columns for the journal Population, including one on “the demographic situation in France.”

In addition to numerous books and articles, Louis Henry is credited with developing the concepts of natural fertility and probability of family expansion, the technique of family reconstruction, and historical demography.This specialty, at the intersection of demography and history, drawing on Parish register, will make it possible to “write full pages of history of the entire population” rather than limiting oneself to the biographies of famous people.

In 1956, he co-authored Des registres paroissiaux à l'histoire de la population. Manuel de dépouillement et d'exploitation de l'état civil ancien (From Parish Registers to Population History: A Manual for Analyzing and Using Old Civil Status Records) with Michel Fleury. Henry proposed reconstructing the French population from 1670 to 1829 based on a study of parish records from Crulai (Normandy). Over the next 20 years, this manual was “reprinted, translated, and used in 22 countries, almost all of those with the necessary equipment.”

In the 1980s, Jean-Noël Biraben continued these historical demographic studies, and a new series of analyses was undertaken in 2022.

== Bibliography ==
- Paul-André Rosental, The Novelty of an Old Genre: Louis Henry and the Founding of Historical Demography, Population (English edition), Volume 58 –2003/1
