= List of countries by population in 1900 =

Historical demographics
Altar of Domitius Ahenobarbus
Articles
Demographic history
Historical demography Classical · Medieval
World population estimates
List of countries by population
1800	1900	1939

This is a list of countries by population in 1900, with colonial possessions being counted towards the ruling country's total (such as Poland counting towards Russia and Cuba counting as part of the United States).

Estimate numbers are from the beginning of the year and exact population figures are for countries that held a census on various dates in the year 1900.

== Map ==
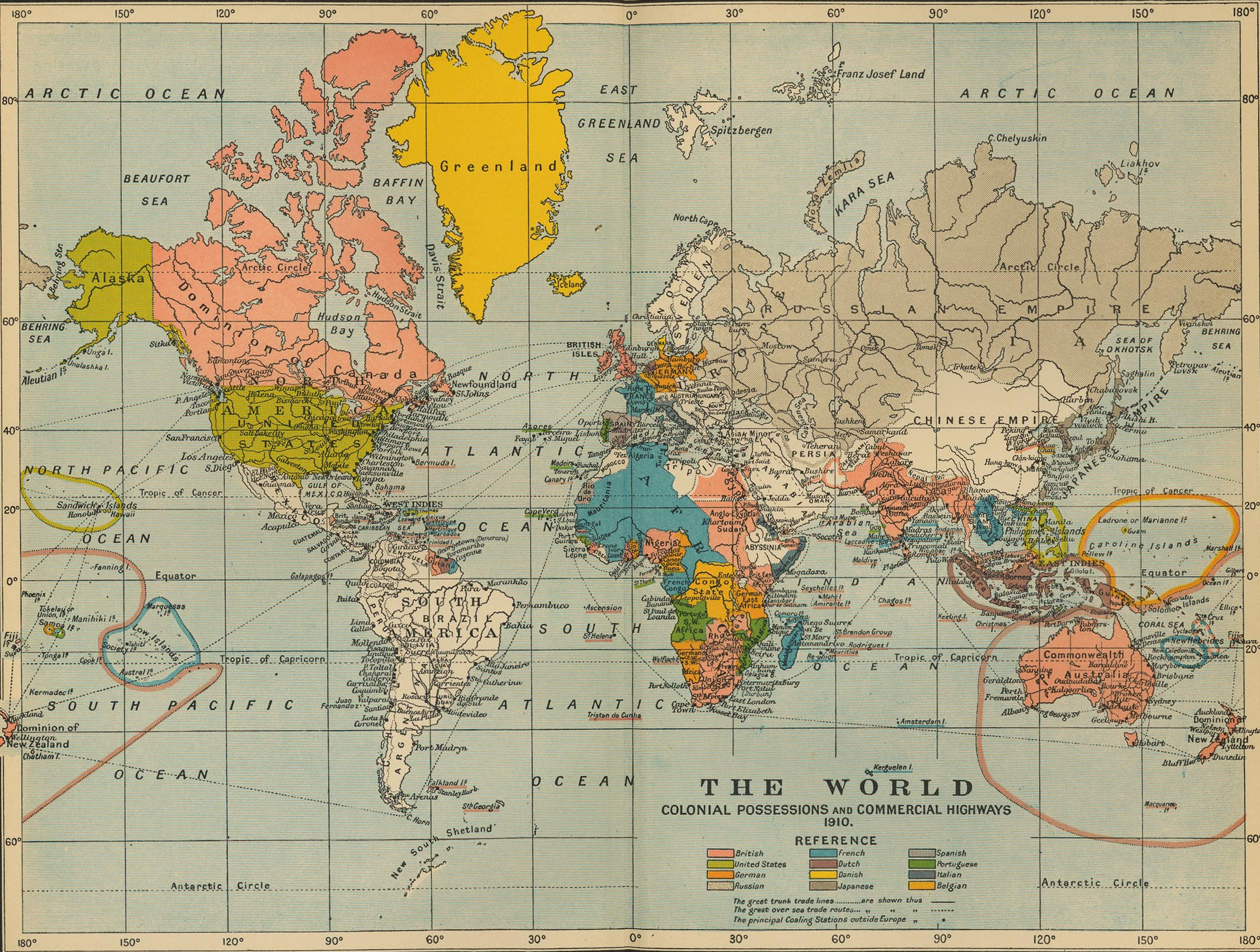
World map of 1910 showing colonial possessions and commercial highways

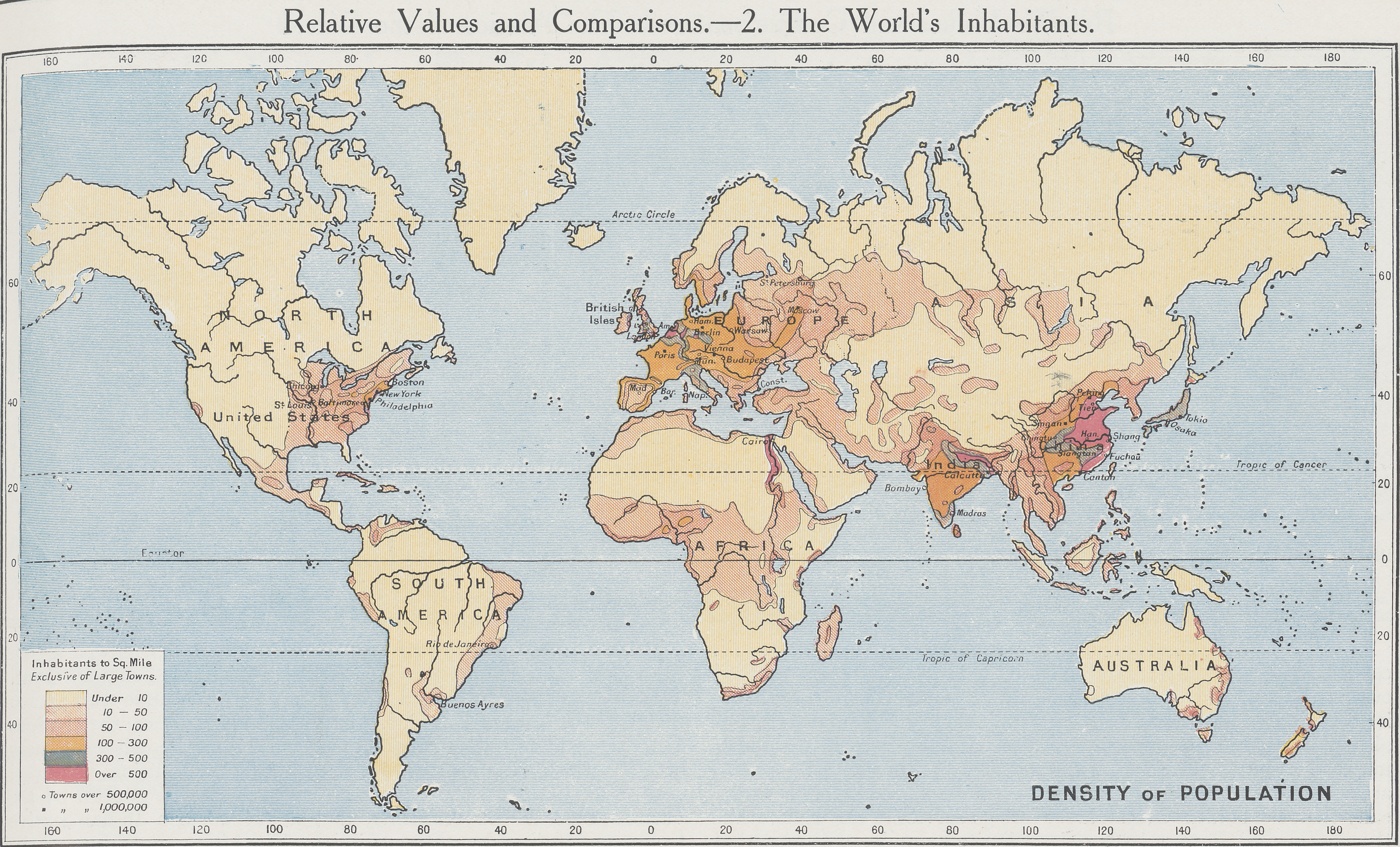
Map from The Harmsworth Atlas and Gazetter showing the world's population density in 1908

== List ==
1. British Empire 23.5%
2. Qing China 23.5%
3. Russian Empire 8.00%
4. United States 4.60%
5. French Empire 4.60%
6. German Empire 4.00%
7. Others 31.8%

Rank	Country/Territory	Population c. 1900 estimate	Percentage of world population
—	World	1,700,100,000	100%
1	British Empire constituents: British Asia – 311,041,000 constituents; (British Raj) India – 241,000,000; (British Raj) Bangladesh – 30,000,000; (British Raj) Pakistan – 23,000,000; (British Raj) Burma – 8,000,000; (British Ceylon) Ceylon – 3,912,000; British Malaya – 900,000; Straits Settlements – 550,000; Sarawak – 500,000; British Hong Kong – 325,000; North Borneo – 300,000; Cyprus – 240,000; Bahrain – 70,000; Trucial Oman – 70,000; Maldives – 57,000; Aden Protectorate – 45,000; Sheikhdom of Kuwait – 40,000; Brunei – 22,000; Qatar – 11,000; British Africa – 44,587,195 constituents; Egypt – 10,000,000; Northern Nigeria – 8,500,000; Southern Nigeria – 7,500,000; (Egypt) Anglo-Egyptian Sudan – 5,588,000; Cape Colony – 2,500,000; Uganda – 1,649,000; Gold Coast – 1,486,400; Kenya – 1,352,000; Sierra Leone (including protectorate) – 1,027,000; Colony of Natal – 925,100; Northern Rhodesia – 770,000; Nyasaland – 717,000; Southern Rhodesia – 692,000; Basutoland – 383,000; Mauritius– 375,000; Somaliland – 300,000; Zanzibar (UK and Oman) – 250,000; Gambia – 165,000; Bechuanaland – 90,000; Swaziland – 90,000; Seychelles – 22,000; Witu Sultanate – 15,000; Saint Helena – 4,500; Ascension Island – 100; Tristan da Cunha – 95; United Kingdom – 44,498,900; Canada – 5,301,000; Australia – 3,765,700 constituents; Territory of Papua – 400,000; British West Indies – 1,685,000 constituents; Jamaica – 720,000; Trinidad and Tobago – 320,000; Barbados – 182,000; Grenada – 70,000; Bahamas – 55,000; Saint Lucia – 50,000; Saint Vincent and the Grenadines – 49,000; British Honduras – 45,000; Saint Kitts and Nevis – 45,000; Antigua and Barbuda – 35,000; Dominica – 32,000; Bermuda – 20,000; Montserrat – 12,000; Turks and Caicos Islands – 5,500; British Virgin Islands – 5,000; Cayman Islands – 5,000; Anguilla – 4,500; New Zealand – 802,200; British Guiana – 300,000; Newfoundland – 230,000; Western Pacific Territories – 375,689 constituents; Solomon Islands – 135,000; Fiji – 125,000; New Hebrides – 50,000; Gilbert Islands – 30,000; Tonga – 21,000; Cook Islands – 6,000; Niue – 4,000; Ellice Islands – 2,400; Christmas Island – 900; Cocos Islands – 650; Tokelau Islands – 500; Pitcairn Islands – 170; Phoenix Islands – 69; Malta – 195,000; Gibraltar – 29,000; Falkland Islands – 2,300	412,000,000	23.51%
2	Qing China	400,000,000	23.5%
3	Russian Empire constituents: Russia proper – 73,000,000; Poland – 14,103,766; Grand Duchy of Finland – 2,655,900; Emirate of Bukhara - 1,250,000; Khanate of Khiva - 400,000	136,305,900	8.0%
4	United States constituents: Contiguous United States – 75,994,575; (United States) Cuba – 1,600,000; Puerto Rico – 986,000; Hawaii – 154,000; Alaska – 63,592; Guam – 12,000; American Samoa – 6,000	78,816,167	4.6%
5	French Empire constituents: (France) French Third Republic – 38,900,000; French Indochina – 15,164,500 constituents; Tonkin – 6,000,000; Annam – 4,620,000; French Cochinchina – 2,968,500; Cambodia – 1,103,000; Protectorate of Laos – 473,000; French West Africa – 11,439,000 constituents; French Sudan – 2,672,000; Upper Volta – 2,222,000; Colony of Niger – 1,459,000; French Guinea – 1,459,000; Ivory Coast – 1,355,000; Senegal – 1,200,000; Colony of Dahomey and Dependencies – 570,000; Colony of Mauritania – 502,000; French North Africa – 5,575,000 constituents; French Algeria – 4,675,000; French protectorate of Tunisia – 1,900,000; Colony of Madagascar and Dependencies – 2,539,500 constituents; French Madagascar – 2,249,500; Réunion – 178,000; Comoros – 112,000; French Equatorial Africa – 1,825,000 constituents; Territory of Chad – 675,000; Ubangi-Shari – 630,000; French Congo – 280,000; Gabon – 240,000; French India – 280,000; French West Indies – 375,000 constituents; Guadeloupe – 190,000; Martinique – 185,000; Leased Territory of Guangzhouwan – 185,000; New Caledonia – 54,000; French Somaliland – 50,000; New Hebrides – 50,000; French Polynesia – 30,000; French Guiana – 24,000; Wallis and Futuna – 6,000; Saint Pierre and Miquelon – 5,000	78,790,700	4.6%
6	German Empire constituents: Germany – 56,367,178; (German Empire) Kamerun – 3,500,000; (German Empire) German East Africa – 3,500,000; (German Empire) Ruanda-Urundi – 2,700,000; (German Empire) Togoland – 920,000; (German Empire) German South West Africa – 210,000; German New Guinea – 188,000; (German Empire) Kiaochow – 60,000; (German Empire) German Solomon Islands – 50,000; (German Empire) German Samoa – 37,000; (German Empire) Caroline Islands – 36,000; (German Empire) Micronesia – 15,000; (German Empire) Marshall Islands – 15,000; (German Empire) Palau – 4,000; Neutral Moresnet – 3,000; (German Empire) Mariana Islands – 2,500; (German Empire) Nauru – 1,500	67,609,178	4.0%
7	Austria-Hungary constituents: Hungary – 6,800,000; Austria – 6,000,000; Bohemia – 6,000,000; Galicia – 5,300,000; Moravia – 3,000,000; Slovakia – 2,700,000; Croatia-Slavonia – 2,100,000; Transylvania – 2,100,000; Bosnia – 1,600,000; Dalmatia – 1,300,000; (Slovenia) Carniola – 1,200,000; Südtirol – 500,000	48,300,000	2.8%
8	Dutch Empire constituents: Dutch East Indies – 42,746,000; Netherlands – 5,104,100; (Netherlands) Surinam – 86,000; Netherlands Antilles – 44,000	47,980,100	2.8%
9	Empire of Japan constituents: Japan – 43,847,000; Taiwan - 2,759,453	46,606,000	2.7%
10	Kingdom of Italy constituents: Kingdom of Italy – 32,475,000; (Italy) Italian Somaliland - 400,000; (Italy) Italian Eritrea - 220,000	33,095,000	1.9%
11	Ottoman Empire (Note: The Ottoman empire was highly centralized, so certain subdivisions (such as the Cretan State) are listed separately. This total also doesn't include the tributary states of Egypt, Bulgaria, East Rumelia, Samos, or Thasos) constituents: Turkey – 14,000,000; Yemen – 2,500,000; Kosovo – 1,600,000; (Ottoman Empire) Aleppo – 1,500,000; (Ottoman Empire) Salonica – 1,300,000; (Ottoman Empire) Manastir – 1,000,000; (Ottoman Empire) Damascus – 1,000,000; Eastern Rumelia – 900,000; (Ottoman Empire) Baghdad – 800,000; (Ottoman Empire) Hejaz – 600,000; (Ottoman Empire) Beirut – 530,000; Tripoli – 500,000; (Ottoman Empire) Scutari – 350,000; Cretan State – 310,000; (Ottoman Empire) Mosul – 300,000; (Ottoman Empire) Basra – 200,000; (Ottoman Empire) Zor – 100,000	31,706,300	1.9%
12	Sokoto Caliphate	10,000,000–20,000,000 (Note: 1837 estimate)	0.6-1.1%
13	Spanish Empire constituents: Spain – 18,594,000; (Spain) Spanish Guinea – 150,000; (Spain) Río de Oro – 40,000; (Spain) Fernando Po – 25,000; (Spain) Spanish Morocco – 22,000; (Spain) Elobey, Annobón, and Corisco – 3,000	18,834,000	1.1%
14	Brazil	17,984,000	1.1%
15	Korean Empire	17,082,000	1.0%
16	Belgian colonial empire constituents: Congo Free State – 8,730,000; Belgium – 6,693,500; Neutral Moresnet – 3,000	15,426,500	0.9%
17	Mexico	13,607,000	0.8%
18	Portuguese Empire constituents: Portugal – 5,450,000; (Portugal) Portuguese Angola – 4,790,000; (Portugal) Portuguese Mozambique – 2,239,000; (Portugal) Portuguese India – 475,000; (Portugal) Portuguese Timor – 300,000; (Portugal) Azores – 260,000; (Portugal) Portuguese Guinea – 200,000; (Portugal) Madeira – 160,000; (Portugal) Cape Verde – 140,000; (Portugal) Portuguese Macau – 80,000; (Portugal) São Tomé and Príncipe – 61,000	12,434,000	0.7%
19	(Ethiopia) Ethiopian Empire	12,180,600	0.7%
20	Qajar Iran	9,860,000	0.6%
21	(Thailand) Siam	8,131,247	0.5%
22	Philippines	7,409,000	0.4%
23	Union between Sweden and Norway constituents: Sweden – 5,136,400; Norway – 2,218,000	7,354,400	0.4%
24	Morocco	7,000,000	0.4%
25	Romania	6,000,000	0.4%
26	Afghanistan	4,550,000	0.3%
27	Argentina	4,542,000	0.3%
28	Jabal Shammar (Note: Includes all of modern-day Saudi Arabia)	~4,218,000	~0.2%
29	Colombia (Note: Includes modern-day Panama)	4,157,000	0.2%
30	Bulgaria	3,744,300	0.2%
31	Kingdom of Nepal (Note: Nominally independent British protectorate)	3,599,000	0.2%
32	Switzerland	3,315,400	0.2%
33	Chile	3,110,100	0.18%
34	Peru	3,000,000	0.18%
35	Serbia	2,579,800 (Note: 1902 figure)	0.15%
36	Danish Empire constituents: Denmark – 2,430,000; Iceland – 82,000; Danish Virgin Islands – 28,000; Faroe Islands – 17,000; Greenland – 13,000	2,569,000	0.15%
37	Venezuela	2,445,000	0.14%
38	Bolivia	1,766,000	0.1%
39	South African Republic	1,400,000	
40	Ecuador	1,271,900	
41	Haiti	~1,000,000 (Note: 1899 estimate)	
42	Uruguay	943,000	
43	Guatemala	885,000	
44	El Salvador	801,000	
45	Liberia	641,000	
46	Paraguay	635,600	
47	Dominican Republic	600,000	
48	Honduras	543,700	
49	Muscat and Oman	500,000	
50	Nicaragua	429,300	
51	Orange Free State	400,000	
52	Costa Rica	341,600	
53	Montenegro	320,000	
54	Bhutan (Note: Nominally independent British protectorate)	280,000	
55	Luxembourg	252,000	
56	Monaco	19,000	
57	San Marino	11,000	
58	Liechtenstein	10,000	
59	Andorra	6,000	
