= Historical demography =

Quantitative study of human population in the past

Historical demography is the quantitative study of human population in the past. It is concerned with population size, with the three basic components of population change (fertility, mortality, and migration), and with population characteristics related to those components, such as marriage, socioeconomic status, and the configuration of families.

== Sources ==
The sources of historical demography vary according to the period and topics of the study.

For the recent period — beginning in the early nineteenth century in most European countries, and later in the rest of the world — historical demographers make use of data collected by governments, including censuses and vital statistics.

In the early modern period, historical demographers rely heavily on ecclesiastical records of baptisms, marriages, and burials, using methods developed by French historian Louis Henry, as well as hearth and poll tax records. In 1749 the first population census covering the whole country was conducted in the kingdom of Sweden, including today's Finland.

For population size, sources can also include the size of cities and towns, the size and density of smaller settlements, relying on field survey techniques, the presence or absence of agriculture on marginal land, and inferences from historical records. For population health and life expectancy, paleodemography, based on the study of skeletal remains, is another important approach for populations that precede the modern era, as is the study of ages of death recorded on funerary monuments.

The PUMS (Public User Microdata Samples) data set allows researchers to analyze contemporary and historical data sets.

== Development of techniques ==
Historical analysis has played a central role in the study of population, from Thomas Malthus in the eighteenth century to major twentieth-century demographers such as Ansley Coale and Samuel H. Preston. The French historian Louis Henry (1911-1991) was chiefly responsible for the development of historical demography as a distinct subfield of demography. In recent years, new research in historical demography has proliferated owing to the development of massive new population data collections, including the Demographic Data Base in Umeå, Sweden, the Historical Sample of the Netherlands, and the Integrated Public Use Microdata Series (IPUMS).

According to Willigan and Lynch, the main sources used by demographic historians include archaeological methods, parish registers starting about 1500 in Europe, civil registration records, enumerations, national census beginning about 1800, genealogies and family reconstruction studies, population registers, and organizational and institutional records. Statistical methods have included model life tables, time series analysis, event history analysis, causal model building and hypothesis testing, as well as theories of the demographic transition and the epidemiological transition.

== See also ==
- Classical demography
- Medieval demography
- Early modern demography
