= Estimates of historical world population =

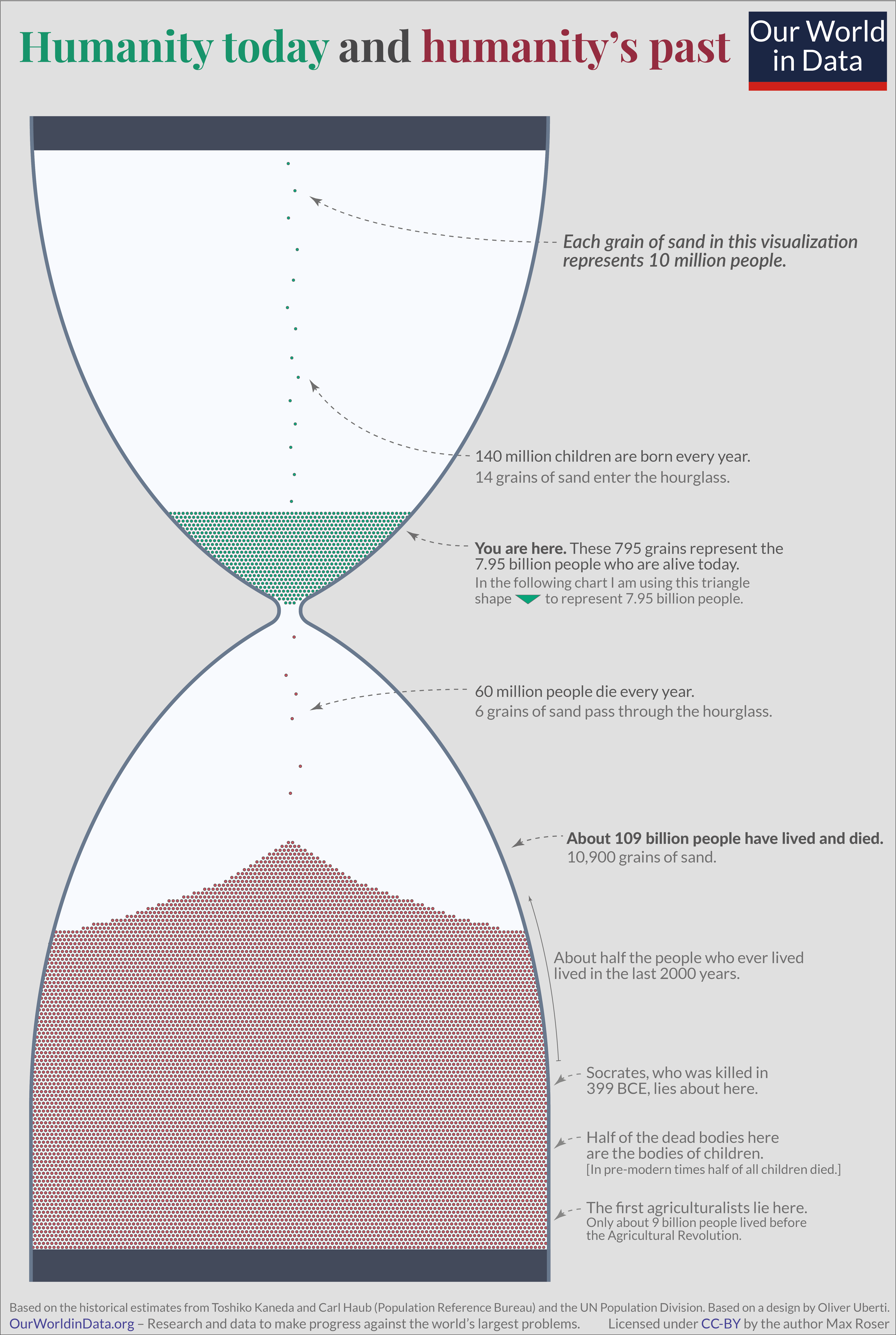
Comparison of humans living today with all previous generations

This article lists current estimates of the world population in history. In summary, estimates for the progression of world population since the Late Middle Ages are in the following ranges:

Year	1400	1500	1600	1700	1800	1900	2000	2100
population (in millions)	350M–400M	430M–500M	500M–580M	600M–680M	890M–980M	1,560M–1,710M	6,060M–6,150M	c. 10,000M–13,000M
average annual growth	<0.1%	<0.12%	0.15%–0.3%	0.1%–0.15%	0.3%–0.5%	0.5%–0.6%	1.3%–1.4%	0.7%–0.8%

Estimates for pre-modern times are necessarily fraught with great uncertainties, and few of the published estimates have confidence intervals; in the absence of a straightforward means to assess the error of such estimates, a rough idea of expert consensus can be gained by comparing the values given in independent publications. Population estimates cannot be considered accurate to more than two decimal digits; for example, the world population for the year 2012 was estimated at 7.02, 7.06, and 7.08 billion by the United States Census Bureau, the Population Reference Bureau, and the United Nations Department of Economic and Social Affairs, respectively, corresponding to a spread of estimates of the order of 0.8%.

== Deep prehistory ==
Graph of world population over the past 12,000 years (Holocene)

As a general rule, the confidence of estimates on historical world population decreases for the more distant past. Robust population data exist only for the last two or three centuries. Until the late 18th century, few governments had ever performed an accurate census. In many early attempts, such as in Ancient Egypt and the Persian Empire, the focus was on counting merely a subset of the population for purposes of taxation or military service. Published estimates for the 1st century ("AD 1") suggest uncertainty of the order of 50% (estimates range between 150 and 330 million). Some estimates extend their timeline into deep prehistory, to "10,000 BC", i.e., the early Holocene, when world population estimates range roughly between 1 and 10 million (with an uncertainty of up to an order of magnitude).

Estimates for yet deeper prehistory, into the Paleolithic, are of a different nature. At this time, human populations consisted entirely of non-sedentary hunter-gatherer populations, with anatomically modern humans existing alongside archaic human varieties, some of which are still ancestral to the modern human population due to interbreeding with modern humans during the Upper Paleolithic. Estimates of the size of these populations are a topic of paleoanthropology. A late human population bottleneck is postulated by some scholars at approximately 70,000 years ago, during the Toba catastrophe, when Homo sapiens population may have dropped to as low as between 1,000 and 10,000 individuals. For the time of speciation of Homo sapiens, some 200,000 years ago, an effective population size of the order of 10,000 to 30,000 individuals has been estimated, with an actual "census population" of early Homo sapiens of roughly 100,000 to 300,000 individuals.

Estimates regarding the questions of "how many people have ever lived?" or "what percentage of people who have ever lived are alive today?" can be traced to the 1970s. The more dramatic phrasing of "the living outnumber the dead" also dates to the 1970s, a time of population explosion and growing fears of human overpopulation in the wake of decolonization and before the adoption of China's one-child policy. The claim that "the living outnumber the dead" was never accurate. Arthur C. Clarke in 2001: A Space Odyssey (1968) has the claim that "Behind every man now alive stand 30 ghosts, for that is the ratio by which the dead outnumber the living", which was roughly accurate at the time of writing.

Recent estimates of the "total number of people who have ever lived" are in the order of 100 billion. The answer depends on the definition of "people", i.e., whether only Homo sapiens are to be counted, or all of the genus Homo; due to the small population sizes in the Lower Paleolithic, however, the order of magnitude of the estimate is not affected by the choice of cut-off date substantially more than by the uncertainty of estimates throughout the Neolithic to Iron Age. Importantly, the estimate is also affected by the estimate of infant mortalities vs. stillborn infants, due to the very high rate of infant mortality throughout the pre-modern period. An estimate on the "total number of people who have ever lived" as of 1995 was calculated by Haub (1995) at "about 105 billion births since the dawn of the human race" with a cut-off date at 50,000 BC (beginning of the Upper Paleolithic), and inclusion of a high infant mortality rate throughout pre-modern history.

== Historical population ==
=== Before 1950 ===
The following table uses astronomical year numbering for dates, negative numbers corresponding roughly to the corresponding year BC (strictly speaking, for example, −8,000 = 8,001 BC, etc.). The table starts counting approximately 10,000 years before present, or around 8,000 BC, during the middle Greenlandian, about 1,700 years after the end of the Younger Dryas and 1,800 years before the 8.2-kiloyear event.

From the beginning of the early modern period until the 20th century, world population has been characterized by a rapid growth. For the period of Classical antiquity to the Middle Ages, roughly 500 BC to AD 1500, there was also a general tendency of growth (estimated at a factor 4 to 5 over the 2,000-year period), but not strictly monotonic: A noticeable dip in world population is assumed due to the Black Death in the mid-14th century.

Year	PRB (1973–2016)	UN (2015)	Maddison (2010 and 2023)	HYDE (2010)	Biraben (1980)	McEvedy & Jones (1978)	Thomlinson (1975)	Durand (1974)	Clark (1967)	Gapminder
−10000				2M		4M	1–10M			4M
−9000				4M						
−8000	5M			5M				5–10M		
−7000	7M			8M						
−6000	14M			11M						
−5000	27M			18M		5M	5–20M			5M
−4000	50M			28M		7M				7M
−3000	100M			45M		14M				14M
−2000				72M		27M				27M
−1000	100M			115M		50M				50M
−500	150M									
−200	227M					150M				150M
1	300M	300M	226M	188M	255M	170M	226M	270–330M	256M	170M
100				195M						
200				202M	256M	190M				190M
300				205M						
350									254M	
400				209M	206M	190M				190M
500	280M			210M	206M	190M				190M
600				213M	206M	200M			237M	200M
700				226M	207M	210M				207M
800				240M	224M	220M			261M	224M
900				269M	226M	240M				226M
1000	400M	310M	267M	295M	254M	265M		275–345M	280M	254M
1100	450M			353M	301M	320M				301M
1200	500M			393M	400M	360M			384M	400M
1250		400M			416M					416M
1300	500M			392M	432M	360M	400M			432M
1340					443M				378M	443M
1400	500M			390M	374M	350M				374M
1500	600M	500M	438M	461M	425M			440–540M	427M	460M
1600	600M		556M	554M	579M	545M			498M	579M
1650	(<700M)					545M	500M		516M	579M
1700	660M		603M	603M	1079M	1010M	1000M		1041M	679M
1750		791M		814M			700M			770M
1800	1,000M	978M		989M			900M			985M
1820			1,042M							1,093M
1850	1,265M	1,262M	1,189M	1,263M	1,241M	1,200M	1,200M			1,278M
1870			1,272M							1,347M
1875						1,325M				1,383M
1900	1,656M	1,650M	1,547M	1,654M	1,633M	1,625M	1,600M	1,650–1,710M	1,668M	1,645M
1910		1,750M		1,777M						1,790M
1913			1,793M							1,829M
1920		1,860M	1,935M	1,912M					1,968M	1,924M
1925	2,000M					2,000M				2,007M
1930		2,070M		2,092M					2,145M	2,100M
1940		2,300M	2,240M	2,307M					2,340M	2,324M

=== 1950 to 2016 ===
After World War II, demographic data of some accuracy becomes available for a significant number of countries, and population estimates are often given as grand totals of numbers (typically given by country) of widely diverging accuracies. Some sources give these numbers rounded to the nearest million or the nearest thousand, while others give them without any rounding.

Taking these numbers at face value would be false precision; in spite of being stated to four, seven, or even ten digits, they should not be interpreted as accurate to more than three digits at best (estimates by the United States Census Bureau and by the United Nations differ by about 0.5–1.5%).

Year	United States Census Bureau (2017)	Population Reference Bureau (1973–2016)	United Nations Department of Economic and Social Affairs (2015)	Maddison (2023)	HYDE (2007)	Biraben (1980)	McEvedy & Jones (1978)	Thomlinson (1975)	Durand (1974)	Clark (1967)
1950	2,557,628,654	2,516,000,000	2,525,149,000	2,518,196,000	2,527,960,000	2,527,000,000	2,500,000,000	2,400,000,000		2,486,000,000
1951	2,594,939,877		2,572,850,917	2,571,663,000						
1952	2,636,772,306		2,619,292,068	2,617,949,000						
1953	2,682,053,389		2,665,865,392	2,665,959,000						
1954	2,730,228,104		2,713,172,027	2,716,927,000						
1955	2,782,098,943		2,761,650,981	2,769,074,000						
1956	2,835,299,673		2,811,572,031	2,822,502,000						
1957	2,891,349,717		2,863,042,795	2,879,934,000						
1958	2,948,137,248		2,916,030,167	2,939,254,000						
1959	3,000,716,593		2,970,395,814	2,995,909,000						
1960	3,043,001,508		3,026,002,942	3,028,866,000	3,042,000,000					
1961	3,083,966,929		3,082,830,266	3,082,161,000						
1962	3,140,093,217		3,141,071,531	3,135,787,000						3,036,000,000
1963	3,209,827,882		3,201,178,277	3,201,354,000						
1964	3,281,201,306		3,263,738,832	3,266,477,000						
1965	3,350,425,793		3,329,122,479	3,333,138,000						
1966	3,420,677,923		3,397,475,247	3,402,224,000						3,288,000,000
1967	3,490,333,715		3,468,521,724	3,471,464,000						
1968	3,562,313,822		3,541,674,891	3,543,086,000						
1969	3,637,159,050		3,616,108,749	3,615,743,000						
1970	3,712,697,742		3,691,172,616	3,674,961,000	3,710,000,000	3,637,000,000		3,600,000,000	3,600,000,000– 3,700,000,000	3,632,000,000
1971	3,790,326,948		3,766,754,345	3,769,818,000						
1972	3,866,568,653		3,842,873,611	3,846,499,000						
1973	3,942,096,442		3,919,182,332	3,905,392,000	3,923,000,000					3,860,000,000
1974	4,016,608,813		3,995,304,922	3,979,893,000						
1975	4,089,083,233		4,071,020,434	4,052,545,000			3,900,000,000	4,000,000,000		
1976	4,160,185,010		4,146,135,850	4,122,922,000						
1977	4,232,084,578		4,220,816,737	4,194,663,000						
1978	4,304,105,753		4,295,664,825	4,266,854,000						
1979	4,379,013,942		4,371,527,871	4,343,592,000						
1980	4,451,362,735		4,449,048,798	4,417,980,000	4,461,000,000					
1981	4,534,410,125		4,528,234,634	4,492,770,000						
1982	4,614,566,561		4,608,962,418	4,564,600,000						
1983	4,695,736,743		4,691,559,840	4,652,722,000						
1984	4,774,569,391		4,776,392,828	4,732,182,000						
1985	4,856,462,699		4,863,601,517	4,812,663,000						
1986	4,940,571,232		4,953,376,710	4,895,197,000						
1987	5,027,200,492		5,045,315,871	4,980,227,000						
1988	5,114,557,167		5,138,214,688	5,066,394,000						
1989	5,201,440,110		5,230,000,000	5,153,239,000						
1990	5,288,955,934		5,320,816,667	5,240,990,000	5,308,000,000					
1991	5,371,585,922		5,408,908,724	5,327,230,000						
1992	5,456,136,278		5,494,899,570	5,412,406,000						
1993	5,538,268,316		5,578,865,109	5,489,405,000						
1994	5,618,682,132		5,661,086,346	5,569,286,000						
1995	5,699,202,985	5,760,000,000	5,741,822,412	5,650,382,000						
1996	5,779,440,593		5,821,016,750	5,731,639,000						
1997	5,857,972,543	5,840,000,000	5,898,688,337	5,811,891,000						
1998	5,935,213,248		5,975,303,657	5,890,722,000						
1999	6,012,074,922		6,051,478,010	5,969,267,000						
2000	6,088,571,383	6,067,000,000	6,127,700,428	6,047,911,000	6,145,000,000		5,750,000,000			
2001	6,165,219,247	6,137,000,000	6,204,147,026	6,125,941,000						
2002	6,242,016,348	6,215,000,000	6,280,853,817	6,204,528,000						
2003	6,318,590,956	6,314,000,000	6,357,991,749	6,282,870,000						
2004	6,395,699,509	6,396,000,000	6,435,705,595	6,361,171,000						
2005	6,473,044,732	6,477,000,000	6,514,094,605	6,439,565,000						
2006	6,551,263,534	6,555,000,000	6,593,227,977	6,518,903,000						
2007	6,629,913,759	6,625,000,000	6,673,105,937	6,599,686,000						
2008	6,709,049,780	6,705,000,000	6,753,649,228	6,681,610,000						
2009	6,788,214,394	6,809,972,000	6,834,721,933	6,763,350,000						
2010	6,858,584,755	6,892,319,000	6,916,183,482	6,844,270,000						
2011	6,935,999,491	6,986,951,000	6,997,998,760	6,926,423,000						
2012	7,013,871,313	7,057,075,000	7,080,072,417	7,010,582,000						
2013	7,092,128,094	7,136,796,000	7,162,119,434	7,093,643,000						
2014	7,169,968,185	7,238,184,000	7,243,784,000	7,181,310,000						
2015	7,247,892,788	7,336,435,000	7,349,472,000	7,263,546,000						
2016	7,325,996,709	7,418,151,841		7,346,251,000						

== Historical estimates by region and country ==
=== By region ===
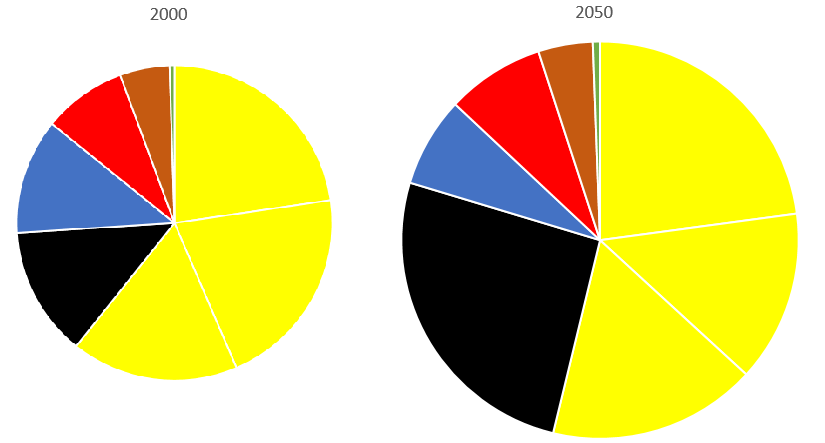
UN estimates (as of 2017) for world population by continent in 2000 and in 2050 (pie chart size to scale) Asia Africa Europe Central/South America North America Oceania

The regional makeup of the world's has changed dramatically in the past two thousand years. In 1 CE, population in Asia was more than 4 times the European population, and the combined population of Sub-Saharan Africa and Latin America totaled roughly 6 percent of the world's population. The total population of the "Western Offshoots"--the former British colonies of Canada, Australia, New Zealand, and the United States--made up less than 0.5% of the total. The distribution of population by region in 2022 looks very different: Latin America and Sub-Saharan Africa are home to nearly a quarter of the people in the world, and more than 5% live in the four "Western Offshoots" nations.

The rate of growth of the world's population changed dramatically as well, rising more than a hundred-fold from an average population growth of less than a tenth of a percent per year from 1-1000 CE to 1.9% average annual growth between 1950 and 1975. Growth has slowed substantially in the years since, averaging 1.1% annual growth between 2000 and 2022.

Population estimates by region, 1-2022 CE
Region	1	1000	1500	1600	1700	1820	1870	1900	1950	1975	2000	2022
East Asia	62.6M	66.5M	118.4M	178.5M	165.0M	427.8M	409.2M	457.1M	670.4M	1,099.5M	1,483.7M	1,634.8M
South Asia and Southeast Asia	77.8M	80.2M	120.7M	146.7M	178.1M	255.7M	327.7M	366.0M	652.0M	1,127.7M	1,889.9M	2,545.7M
Eastern Europe	8.7M	13.6M	30.4M	37.7M	45.3M	91.2M	142.2M	195.5M	266.9M	366.4M	407.5M	407.2M
Western Europe	24.8M	25.3M	57.8M	74.4M	83.0M	139.5M	191.9M	236.9M	304.9M	361.9M	390.2M	430.0M
Sub-Saharan Africa	8.3M	21.8M	38.3M	44.3M	51.8M	63.3M	70.0M	86.0M	178.9M	327.9M	652.5M	1,174.7M
Middle East and North Africa	21.7M	24.0M	19.6M	25.1M	23.7M	35.9M	45.8M	56.0M	103.8M	198.8M	375.7M	560.4M
Latin America	5.6M	11.4M	17.5M	8.6M	12.1M	20.7M	39.0M	62.7M	164.2M	320.1M	512.7M	647.2M
Western Offshoots	1.1M	1.9M	2.8M	2.3M	1.8M	11.2M	46.1M	86.4M	176.5M	256.1M	335.7M	403.0M
World	225.8M	267.3M	438.4M	556.1M	603.5M	1,042.0M	1,272.0M	1,546.5M	2,518.2M	4,052.5M	6,047.9M	7,802.0M
World population growth per year		+0.0%	+0.1%	+0.2%	+0.1%	+0.5%	+0.4%	+0.7%	+1.0%	+1.9%	+1.6%	+1.1%

=== By country ===
The historical population for many countries in the world is difficult to estimate before the past several hundred years due to incomplete recordkeeping or insufficient archaeological evidence. However, the Maddison Project has been able to estimate the populations of 43 countries back to 1 AD. They show that the two countries with the largest populations in 2022, India and China, were also the world's most populous countries more than two thousand years ago. Western European populations generally grew slowly until the late 18th century, when the Industrial Revolution caused both standards of living and populations to rise rapidly.

Population estimates, selected countries (in millions), by region, 1–2022 AD
Country/Region	1	1000	1500	1600	1700	1820	1870	1900	1950	1975	2000	2022
East Asia
China	59.6M	59.0M	103.0M	160.0M	138.0M	381.0M	358.0M	400.0M	546.8M	916.4M	1,258.7M	1,401.7M
Japan	3.0M	7.5M	15.4M	18.5M	27.0M	31.0M	34.4M	44.1M	83.8M	111.6M	126.8M	124.8M
Eastern Europe
Albania	0.2M	0.2M	0.2M	0.2M	0.3M	0.4M	0.6M	0.8M	1.2M	2.4M	3.1M	2.8M
Bulgaria	0.5M	0.8M	0.8M	1.3M	1.3M	2.2M	2.6M	4.0M	7.3M	8.7M	8.1M	6.7M
Czechoslovakia (former)	1.0M	1.3M	3.0M	4.5M	4.5M	7.7M	10.2M	12.1M	12.4M	14.8M	15.6M	16.1M
Hungary	0.3M	0.5M	1.3M	1.3M	1.5M	4.1M	5.9M	7.1M	9.3M	10.5M	10.2M	9.7M
Poland	0.5M	1.2M	4.0M	5.0M	6.0M	10.4M	16.9M	24.8M	24.8M	34.0M	38.3M	37.9M
Romania	0.8M	0.8M	2.0M	2.0M	2.5M	6.4M	9.2M	11.0M	16.3M	21.2M	22.3M	19.3M
USSR (former)	3.9M	7.1M	17.0M	20.7M	26.6M	54.8M	88.7M	124.5M	179.6M	254.5M	288.7M	294.4M
Yugoslavia (former)	1.5M	1.8M	2.3M	2.8M	2.8M	5.2M	8.3M	11.2M	16.3M	20.7M	22.5M	20.9M
Latin America
Mexico	2.2M	4.5M	7.5M	2.5M	4.5M	6.6M	9.2M	13.6M	28.5M	60.7M	98.4M	125.2M
Middle East and North Africa
Algeria	2.0M	2.0M	1.5M	2.3M	1.8M	2.7M	3.8M	5.5M	8.9M	16.1M	30.5M	44.1M
Egypt	4.5M	5.0M	4.0M	5.0M	4.5M	4.2M	7.1M	12.1M	21.2M	37.0M	67.4M	110.6M
Iran	4.0M	4.5M	4.0M	5.0M	5.0M	6.6M	8.4M	11.0M	16.4M	33.3M	65.4M	85.1M
Iraq	1.0M	2.0M	1.0M	1.3M	1.0M	1.1M	1.6M	2.6M	5.2M	11.1M	22.7M	40.4M
Libya	0.4M	0.5M	0.5M	0.5M	0.5M	0.5M			1.0M	2.6M	5.1M	7.2M
Morocco	1.0M	2.0M	1.5M	2.3M	1.8M	2.7M	3.8M	5.1M	9.3M	17.7M	28.7M	37.1M
Tunisia	0.8M	1.0M	0.8M	1.0M	0.8M	0.9M	1.2M	1.9M	3.5M	5.7M	9.5M	11.9M
Turkey	8.0M	7.0M	6.3M	7.9M	8.4M	10.1M	11.8M	15.0M	21.1M	40.5M	65.9M	87.2M
South and South East Asia
India	75.0M	75.0M	110.0M	135.0M	165.0M	209.0M	253.0M	284.5M	359.0M	607.0M	1,018.7M	1,349.1M
Indonesia	2.8M	5.2M	10.7M	11.7M	13.1M	17.9M	32.7M	45.1M	82.6M	131.2M	211.4M	273.4M
Sub-Saharan Africa
Ethiopia	0.5M	1.0M	2.0M	2.3M	2.5M	3.2M			20.6M	33.8M	65.2M	117.9M
Mozambique	0.1M	0.3M	1.0M	1.3M	1.5M	2.1M			6.3M	10.4M	16.8M	28.9M
South Africa	0.1M	0.3M	0.6M	0.7M	1.0M	1.6M	2.5M	6.2M	13.6M	25.8M	47.0M	63.4M
Sudan (former)	2.0M	3.0M	4.0M	4.2M	4.4M	5.2M			6.3M	12.5M	26.8M	46.5M
Western Europe
Austria	0.5M	0.7M	2.0M	2.5M	2.5M	3.4M	4.5M	6.0M	6.9M	7.6M	8.1M	9.1M
Belgium	0.3M	0.4M	1.4M	1.6M	2.0M	3.4M	5.1M	6.7M	8.6M	9.8M	10.3M	11.7M
Denmark	0.2M	0.4M	0.6M	0.7M	0.7M	1.2M	1.9M	2.6M	4.3M	5.1M	5.4M	5.9M
Finland	0.0M	0.0M	0.3M	0.4M	0.4M	1.2M	1.8M	2.6M	4.0M	5.2M	5.6M	5.2M
France	5.0M	6.5M	15.0M	18.5M	21.5M	31.3M	38.4M	40.6M	42.5M	54.0M	60.8M	68.3M
Germany	3.0M	3.5M	12.0M	16.0M	15.0M	24.9M	39.2M	54.4M	68.4M	78.7M	81.5M	83.8M
Greece	2.0M	1.0M	1.0M	1.5M	1.5M	2.3M	3.7M	5.0M	7.6M	9.1M	10.7M	10.4M
Italy	8.0M	5.0M	10.5M	13.1M	13.3M	20.2M	27.9M	33.7M	47.1M	55.6M	57.0M	59.0M
Netherlands	0.2M	0.3M	1.0M	1.5M	1.9M	2.3M	3.6M	5.1M	10.1M	13.7M	15.9M	17.7M
Norway	0.1M	0.2M	0.3M	0.4M	0.5M	1.0M	1.7M	2.2M	3.3M	4.0M	4.5M	5.5M
Portugal	0.4M	0.6M	1.0M	1.1M	2.0M	3.3M	4.3M	5.4M	8.4M	9.4M	10.2M	10.2M
Spain	3.8M	4.0M	6.8M	8.2M	8.8M	12.2M	16.2M	18.6M	28.1M	35.6M	40.6M	47.6M
Sweden	0.2M	0.4M	0.6M	0.8M	1.3M	2.5M	4.2M	5.1M	7.0M	8.2M	8.9M	10.5M
Switzerland	0.3M	0.3M	0.7M	1.0M	1.2M	2.0M	2.7M	3.3M	4.7M	6.4M	7.3M	8.8M
United Kingdom	0.8M	2.0M	3.9M	6.2M	8.6M	21.2M	31.4M	41.2M	50.1M	56.2M	59.2M	68.1M
Western Offshoots
Australia	0.4M	0.4M	0.5M	0.5M	0.5M	0.3M	1.8M	3.7M	8.3M	13.8M	18.9M	25.8M
Canada	0.1M	0.2M	0.3M	0.3M	0.2M	0.8M	3.8M	5.5M	14.0M	23.2M	30.8M	38.7M
United States	0.7M	1.3M	2.0M	1.5M	1.0M	10.0M	40.2M	76.3M	152.3M	216.0M	282.2M	333.3M
