= List of countries and dependencies by population (United Nations) =

UN list of countries and territories by population

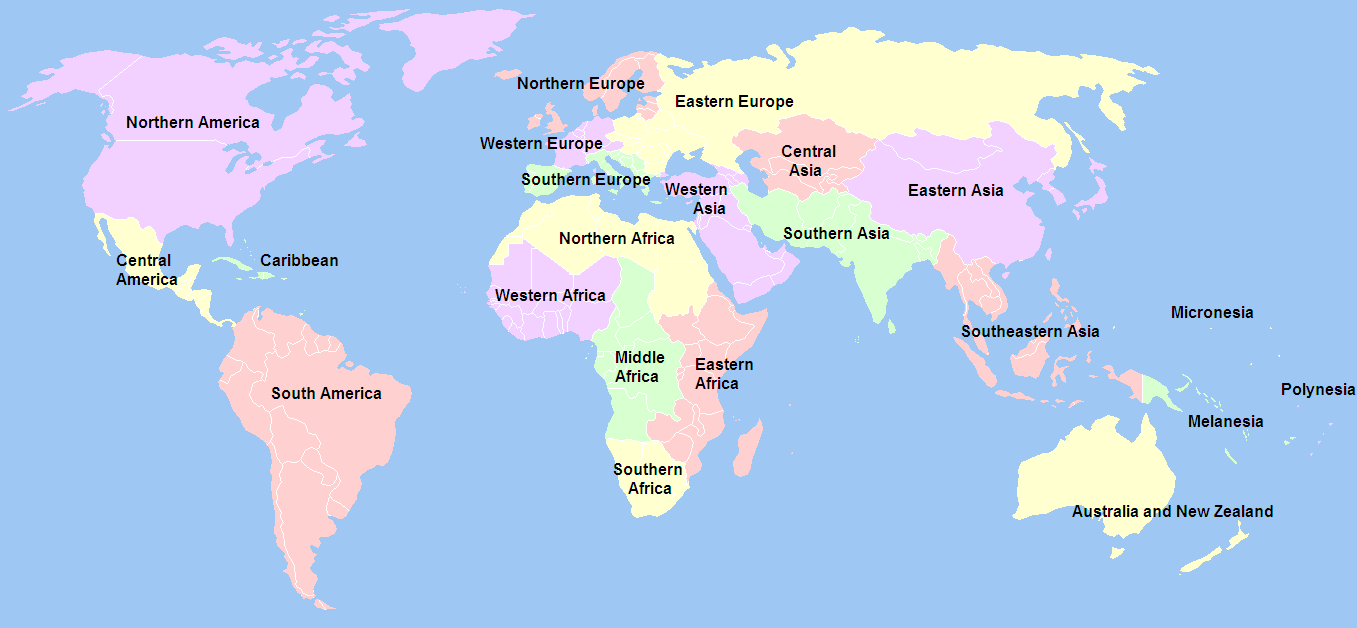
Statistical subregions as defined by the United Nations Statistics Division

This is a list of countries and other inhabited territories of the world by estimated total population. It is based on estimates published by the United Nations in the 2024 revision of World Population Prospects. It presents population estimates from 1950 to the present.

== List ==
Data are mid-year estimates from the United Nations and are for 2022 and 2023.

List of countries and inhabited territories by total population. United Nations
Country or territory	Population (1 July 2022)	Population (1 July 2023)	Change (%)	UN continental region	UN statistical subregion
World	8,021,407,192	8,091,734,930	+0.88%	–	–
India	1,425,423,212	1,438,069,596	+0.89%	Asia	Southern Asia
China (Note: Refers to mainland China only. The UN source document states: "For statistical purposes, the data for China do not include special administrative regions (SAR) of China (Hong Kong and Macau) and Taiwan.")	1,425,179,569	1,422,584,933	−0.18%	Asia	Eastern Asia
United States	341,534,046	343,477,335	+0.57%	Americas	Northern America
Indonesia	278,830,529	281,190,067	+0.85%	Asia	South-eastern Asia
Pakistan	243,700,667	247,504,495	+1.56%	Asia	Southern Asia
Nigeria	223,150,896	227,882,945	+2.12%	Africa	Western Africa
Brazil	210,306,415	211,140,729	+0.40%	Americas	South America
Bangladesh	169,384,897	171,466,990	+1.23%	Asia	Southern Asia
Russia	145,579,899	145,440,500	−0.10%	Europe	Eastern Europe
Mexico	128,613,117	129,739,759	+0.88%	Americas	Central America
Ethiopia	125,384,287	128,691,692	+2.64%	Africa	Eastern Africa
Japan	124,997,578	124,370,947	−0.50%	Asia	Eastern Asia
Philippines	113,964,338	114,891,199	+0.81%	Asia	South-eastern Asia
Egypt	112,618,250	114,535,772	+1.70%	Africa	Northern Africa
DR Congo	102,396,968	105,789,731	+3.31%	Africa	Middle Africa
Vietnam	99,680,655	100,352,192	+0.67%	Asia	South-eastern Asia
Iran	89,524,246	90,608,707	+1.21%	Asia	Southern Asia
Turkey	87,058,473	87,270,501	+0.24%	Asia	Western Asia
Germany	84,086,227	84,548,231	+0.55%	Europe	Western Europe
Thailand	71,735,329	71,702,435	−0.05%	Asia	South-eastern Asia
United Kingdom	68,179,315	68,682,962	+0.74%	Europe	Northern Europe
Tanzania (Note: Including Zanzibar.)	64,711,821	66,617,606	+2.95%	Africa	Eastern Africa
France (Note: Refers to Metropolitan France only.)	66,277,409	66,438,822	+0.24%	Europe	Western Europe
South Africa	62,378,410	63,212,384	+1.34%	Africa	Southern Africa
Italy	59,619,115	59,499,453	−0.20%	Europe	Southern Europe
Kenya	54,252,461	55,339,003	+2.00%	Africa	Eastern Africa
Myanmar	53,756,787	54,133,798	+0.70%	Asia	South-eastern Asia
Colombia	51,737,944	52,321,152	+1.13%	Americas	South America
South Korea	51,782,512	51,748,739	−0.07%	Asia	Eastern Asia
Sudan	49,383,346	50,042,791	+1.34%	Africa	Northern Africa
Uganda	47,312,719	48,656,601	+2.84%	Africa	Eastern Africa
Spain (Note: Including the Canary Islands, Ceuta, and Melilla.)	47,828,382	47,911,579	+0.17%	Europe	Southern Europe
Algeria	45,477,389	46,164,219	+1.51%	Africa	Northern Africa
Argentina	45,407,904	45,538,401	+0.29%	Americas	South America
Iraq	44,070,551	45,074,049	+2.28%	Asia	Western Asia
Afghanistan	40,578,842	41,454,761	+2.16%	Asia	Southern Asia
Yemen	38,222,876	39,390,799	+3.06%	Asia	Western Asia
Canada	38,821,259	39,299,105	+1.23%	Americas	Northern America
Poland	38,385,739	38,762,844	+0.98%	Europe	Eastern Europe
Ukraine (Note: IncludingCrimea, theDonetsk People's Republic, theLuhansk People's Republic, andSevastopol.)	41,048,766	37,732,836	−8.08%	Europe	Eastern Europe
Morocco	37,329,064	37,712,505	+1.03%	Africa	Northern Africa
Angola	35,635,029	36,749,906	+3.13%	Africa	Middle Africa
Uzbekistan	34,938,955	35,652,307	+2.04%	Asia	Central Asia
Malaysia	34,695,493	35,126,298	+1.24%	Asia	South-eastern Asia
Peru	33,475,438	33,845,617	+1.11%	Americas	South America
Ghana	33,149,152	33,787,914	+1.93%	Africa	Western Africa
Mozambique	32,656,246	33,635,160	+3.00%	Africa	Eastern Africa
Saudi Arabia	32,175,352	32,264,292	+0.28%	Asia	Western Asia
Madagascar	30,437,261	31,195,932	+2.49%	Africa	Eastern Africa
Ivory Coast	30,395,002	31,165,654	+2.54%	Africa	Western Africa
Nepal	29,715,436	29,964,614	+0.84%	Asia	Southern Asia
Cameroon	27,632,771	28,372,687	+2.68%	Africa	Middle Africa
Venezuela	28,213,017	28,300,854	+0.31%	Americas	South America
Australia (Note: Including Christmas Island, the Cocos (Keeling) Islands, and Norfolk Island.)	26,200,984	26,451,124	+0.95%	Oceania	Australia and New Zealand
North Korea	26,329,845	26,418,204	+0.34%	Asia	Eastern Asia
Niger	25,311,973	26,159,867	+3.35%	Africa	Western Africa
Mali	23,072,640	23,769,127	+3.02%	Africa	Western Africa
Syria	22,462,173	23,594,623	+5.04%	Asia	Western Asia
Taiwan (Note: Listed as China, Taiwan Province of China.)	23,420,111	23,317,145	−0.44%	Asia	Eastern Asia
Burkina Faso	22,509,038	23,025,776	+2.30%	Africa	Western Africa
Sri Lanka	22,834,965	22,971,617	+0.60%	Asia	Southern Asia
Malawi	20,568,728	21,104,482	+2.60%	Africa	Eastern Africa
Zambia	20,152,938	20,723,965	+2.83%	Africa	Eastern Africa
Kazakhstan	20,034,609	20,330,104	+1.47%	Asia	Central Asia
Chile	19,553,036	19,658,835	+0.54%	Americas	South America
Chad	18,455,316	19,319,064	+4.68%	Africa	Middle Africa
Romania	19,166,772	19,118,479	−0.25%	Europe	Eastern Europe
Somalia (Note: Including Somaliland.)	17,801,897	18,358,615	+3.13%	Africa	Eastern Africa
Guatemala	17,847,877	18,124,838	+1.55%	Americas	Central America
Senegal	17,651,103	18,077,573	+2.42%	Africa	Western Africa
Netherlands (Note: Refers to the European Netherlands only.)	17,904,421	18,092,524	+1.05%	Europe	Western Europe
Ecuador	17,823,897	17,980,083	+0.88%	Americas	South America
Cambodia	17,201,724	17,423,880	+1.29%	Asia	South-eastern Asia
Zimbabwe	16,069,056	16,340,822	+1.69%	Africa	Eastern Africa
Guinea	14,055,137	14,405,465	+2.49%	Africa	Western Africa
Benin	13,759,501	14,111,034	+2.55%	Africa	Western Africa
Rwanda	13,651,030	13,954,471	+2.22%	Africa	Eastern Africa
Burundi	13,321,097	13,689,450	+2.77%	Africa	Eastern Africa
Bolivia	12,077,154	12,244,159	+1.38%	Americas	South America
Tunisia	12,119,334	12,200,431	+0.67%	Africa	Northern Africa
Belgium	11,641,820	11,712,893	+0.61%	Europe	Western Europe
Haiti	11,503,606	11,637,398	+1.16%	Americas	Caribbean
South Sudan	11,021,177	11,483,374	+4.19%	Africa	Eastern Africa
Jordan	11,256,263	11,439,213	+1.63%	Asia	Western Asia
Dominican Republic	11,230,734	11,331,265	+0.90%	Americas	Caribbean
Cuba	11,059,820	11,019,931	−0.36%	Americas	Caribbean
Czechia	10,673,213	10,809,716	+1.28%	Europe	Eastern Europe
Honduras	10,463,872	10,644,851	+1.73%	Americas	Central America
United Arab Emirates	10,242,086	10,642,081	+3.91%	Asia	Western Asia
Sweden	10,487,338	10,551,494	+0.61%	Europe	Northern Europe
Portugal (Note: Including the Azores and Madeira.)	10,417,073	10,430,738	+0.13%	Europe	Southern Europe
Tajikistan	10,182,222	10,389,799	+2.04%	Asia	Central Asia
Papua New Guinea	10,203,169	10,389,635	+1.83%	Oceania	Melanesia
Azerbaijan	10,295,304	10,318,207	+0.22%	Asia	Western Asia
Greece	10,412,480	10,242,908	−1.63%	Europe	Southern Europe
Hungary	9,964,306	9,686,463	−2.79%	Europe	Eastern Europe
Togo	9,089,738	9,304,337	+2.36%	Africa	Western Africa
Israel	9,103,151	9,256,314	+1.68%	Asia	Western Asia
Austria	9,064,677	9,130,429	+0.73%	Europe	Western Europe
Belarus	9,173,237	9,115,680	−0.63%	Europe	Eastern Europe
Switzerland	8,792,182	8,870,561	+0.89%	Europe	Western Europe
Sierra Leone	8,276,807	8,460,512	+2.22%	Africa	Western Africa
Laos	7,559,007	7,664,993	+1.40%	Asia	South-eastern Asia
Hong Kong (China) (Note: Listed as China, Hong Kong SAR.)	7,465,915	7,442,734	−0.31%	Asia	Eastern Asia
Turkmenistan	7,230,193	7,364,438	+1.86%	Asia	Central Asia
Libya	7,223,805	7,305,659	+1.13%	Africa	Northern Africa
Kyrgyzstan	6,955,788	7,073,516	+1.69%	Asia	Central Asia
Paraguay	6,760,464	6,844,146	+1.24%	Americas	South America
Nicaragua	6,730,654	6,823,613	+1.38%	Americas	Central America
Bulgaria	6,825,864	6,795,803	−0.44%	Europe	Eastern Europe
Serbia (Note: Excluding Kosovo.)	6,791,213	6,773,201	−0.27%	Europe	Southern Europe
El Salvador	6,280,319	6,309,624	+0.47%	Americas	Central America
Congo	6,035,104	6,182,885	+2.45%	Africa	Middle Africa
Denmark	5,902,904	5,948,136	+0.77%	Europe	Northern Europe
Singapore	5,649,885	5,789,090	+2.46%	Asia	South-eastern Asia
Lebanon	5,744,489	5,733,493	−0.19%	Asia	Western Asia
Finland (Note: Including Åland.)	5,569,299	5,601,185	+0.57%	Europe	Northern Europe
Norway (Note: Including Svalbard and Jan Mayen.)	5,457,801	5,519,167	+1.12%	Europe	Northern Europe
Slovakia	5,473,197	5,518,055	+0.82%	Europe	Eastern Europe
Liberia	5,373,294	5,493,031	+2.23%	Africa	Western Africa
Palestine (Note: Including East Jerusalem.)	5,305,270	5,409,202	+1.96%	Asia	Western Asia
Ireland	5,110,016	5,196,630	+1.69%	Europe	Northern Europe
New Zealand	5,131,734	5,172,836	+0.80%	Oceania	Australia and New Zealand
Central African Republic	5,098,039	5,152,421	+1.07%	Africa	Middle Africa
Costa Rica	5,081,765	5,105,525	+0.47%	Americas	Central America
Oman	4,730,226	5,049,269	+6.74%	Asia	Western Asia
Mauritania	4,875,637	5,022,441	+3.01%	Africa	Western Africa
Kuwait	4,589,511	4,838,782	+5.43%	Asia	Western Asia
Panama	4,400,773	4,458,759	+1.32%	Americas	Central America
Croatia	3,907,027	3,896,023	−0.28%	Europe	Southern Europe
Georgia (Note: Including Abkhazia and South Ossetia.)	3,794,784	3,807,492	+0.33%	Asia	Western Asia
Eritrea	3,409,447	3,470,390	+1.79%	Africa	Eastern Africa
Mongolia	3,386,015	3,431,932	+1.36%	Asia	Eastern Asia
Uruguay	3,390,913	3,388,081	−0.08%	Americas	South America
Puerto Rico (United States)	3,240,968	3,242,023	+0.03%	Americas	Caribbean
Bosnia and Herzegovina	3,204,802	3,185,073	−0.62%	Europe	Southern Europe
Moldova (Note: Including Transnistria.)	3,039,985	3,067,070	+0.89%	Europe	Eastern Europe
Qatar	2,892,455	2,979,082	+2.99%	Asia	Western Asia
Namibia	2,889,662	2,963,095	+2.54%	Africa	Southern Africa
Armenia	2,880,874	2,943,393	+2.17%	Asia	Western Asia
Lithuania	2,816,919	2,854,099	+1.32%	Europe	Northern Europe
Jamaica	2,839,144	2,839,786	+0.02%	Americas	Caribbean
Albania	2,827,608	2,811,655	−0.56%	Europe	Southern Europe
Gambia	2,636,470	2,697,845	+2.33%	Africa	Western Africa
Gabon	2,430,747	2,484,789	+2.22%	Africa	Middle Africa
Botswana	2,439,892	2,480,244	+1.65%	Africa	Southern Africa
Lesotho	2,286,110	2,311,472	+1.11%	Africa	Southern Africa
Guinea-Bissau	2,105,529	2,153,339	+2.27%	Africa	Western Africa
Slovenia	2,115,228	2,118,396	+0.15%	Europe	Southern Europe
Latvia	1,881,063	1,882,396	+0.07%	Europe	Northern Europe
Equatorial Guinea	1,803,545	1,847,549	+2.44%	Africa	Middle Africa
North Macedonia	1,840,233	1,831,802	−0.46%	Europe	Southern Europe
Kosovo (Note: Listed as Kosovo (under UNSC res. 1244).)	1,717,946	1,700,031	−1.04%	Europe	Southern Europe
Bahrain	1,533,459	1,569,666	+2.36%	Asia	Western Asia
Trinidad and Tobago	1,495,921	1,502,932	+0.47%	Americas	Caribbean
Timor-Leste	1,369,295	1,384,286	+1.09%	Asia	South-eastern Asia
Estonia	1,350,091	1,367,196	+1.27%	Europe	Northern Europe
Cyprus (Note: Including Northern Cyprus.)	1,331,370	1,344,976	+1.02%	Asia	Western Asia
Mauritius	1,276,130	1,273,588	−0.20%	Africa	Eastern Africa
Eswatini	1,218,917	1,230,506	+0.95%	Africa	Southern Africa
Djibouti	1,137,096	1,152,944	+1.39%	Africa	Eastern Africa
Fiji	919,422	924,145	+0.51%	Oceania	Melanesia
Réunion (France)	871,540	874,883	+0.38%	Africa	Eastern Africa
Comoros	834,188	850,387	+1.94%	Africa	Eastern Africa
Guyana	821,637	826,353	+0.57%	Americas	South America
Solomon Islands	781,066	800,005	+2.42%	Oceania	Melanesia
Bhutan	780,914	786,385	+0.70%	Asia	Southern Asia
Macao (China) (Note: Listed as China, Macao SAR.)	704,356	713,912	+1.36%	Asia	Eastern Asia
Luxembourg	653,313	665,098	+1.80%	Europe	Western Europe
Montenegro	614,648	633,552	+3.08%	Europe	Southern Europe
Suriname	623,164	628,886	+0.92%	Americas	South America
Western Sahara (disputed)	568,739	579,729	+1.93%	Africa	Northern Africa
Malta	528,192	532,956	+0.90%	Europe	Southern Europe
Maldives	524,106	525,994	+0.36%	Asia	Southern Asia
Cape Verde	519,741	522,331	+0.50%	Africa	Western Africa
Brunei	455,370	458,949	+0.79%	Asia	South-eastern Asia
Belize	402,733	411,106	+2.08%	Americas	Central America
Bahamas	397,538	399,440	+0.48%	Americas	Caribbean
Iceland	380,356	387,558	+1.89%	Europe	Northern Europe
Guadeloupe (France)	384,697	376,517	−2.13%	Americas	Caribbean
Martinique (France)	349,459	346,002	−0.99%	Americas	Caribbean
Vanuatu	313,046	320,409	+2.35%	Oceania	Melanesia
Mayotte (France)	305,269	316,015	+3.52%	Africa	Eastern Africa
French Guiana (France)	298,306	303,402	+1.71%	Americas	South America
New Caledonia (France)	287,123	289,870	+0.96%	Oceania	Melanesia
Barbados	288,318	282,336	−2.07%	Americas	Caribbean
French Polynesia (France)	280,378	281,118	+0.26%	Oceania	Polynesia
São Tomé and Príncipe	226,305	230,871	+2.02%	Africa	Middle Africa
Samoa	215,261	216,663	+0.65%	Oceania	Polynesia
Curaçao (Netherlands)	185,345	185,427	+0.04%	Americas	Caribbean
Saint Lucia	178,781	179,285	+0.28%	Americas	Caribbean
Guam (United States)	165,180	166,506	+0.80%	Oceania	Micronesia
Kiribati	130,469	132,530	+1.58%	Oceania	Micronesia
Seychelles	125,522	127,951	+1.94%	Africa	Eastern Africa
Grenada	116,913	117,081	+0.14%	Americas	Caribbean
Federated States of Micronesia	112,114	112,630	+0.46%	Oceania	Micronesia
Tonga	105,042	104,597	−0.42%	Oceania	Polynesia
Aruba (Netherlands)	107,782	107,939	+0.15%	Americas	Caribbean
Jersey (United Kingdom)	103,490	103,674	+0.18%	Europe	Northern Europe
Saint Vincent and the Grenadines	102,046	101,323	−0.71%	Americas	Caribbean
Antigua and Barbuda	92,840	93,316	+0.51%	Americas	Caribbean
U.S. Virgin Islands (United States)	86,507	85,701	−0.93%	Americas	Caribbean
Isle of Man (United Kingdom)	84,132	84,165	+0.04%	Europe	Northern Europe
Andorra	79,705	80,856	+1.44%	Europe	Southern Europe
Cayman Islands (United Kingdom)	71,591	73,038	+2.02%	Americas	Caribbean
Dominica	66,826	66,510	−0.47%	Americas	Caribbean
Bermuda (United Kingdom)	64,749	64,698	−0.08%	Americas	Northern America
Guernsey (United Kingdom)	63,725	64,017	+0.46%	Europe	Northern Europe
Greenland (Denmark)	54,990	55,922	+1.69%	Americas	Northern America
Faroe Islands (Denmark)	54,011	54,714	+1.30%	Europe	Northern Europe
American Samoa (United States)	48,342	47,521	−1.70%	Oceania	Polynesia
Saint Kitts and Nevis	46,709	46,758	+0.10%	Americas	Caribbean
Turks and Caicos Islands (United Kingdom)	45,847	46,198	+0.77%	Americas	Caribbean
Northern Mariana Islands (United States)	46,078	45,143	−2.03%	Oceania	Micronesia
Sint Maarten (Netherlands)	42,139	42,749	+1.45%	Americas	Caribbean
Liechtenstein	39,317	39,598	+0.71%	Europe	Western Europe
British Virgin Islands (United Kingdom)	38,319	38,985	+1.74%	Americas	Caribbean
Monaco	38,931	38,956	+0.06%	Europe	Western Europe
Gibraltar (United Kingdom)	37,609	38,471	+2.29%	Europe	Southern Europe
Marshall Islands	40,077	38,827	−3.12%	Oceania	Micronesia
San Marino	34,090	33,733	−1.05%	Europe	Southern Europe
Caribbean Netherlands (Netherlands) (Note: Listed as Bonaire, Sint Eustatius and Saba.)	28,627	29,898	+4.44%	Americas	Caribbean
Saint Martin (France)	28,870	27,515	−4.69%	Americas	Caribbean
Palau	17,759	17,727	−0.18%	Oceania	Micronesia
Anguilla (United Kingdom)	14,180	14,410	+1.62%	Americas	Caribbean
Cook Islands	14,723	14,222	−3.40%	Oceania	Polynesia
Nauru	11,801	11,875	+0.63%	Oceania	Micronesia
Wallis and Futuna (France)	11,478	11,370	−0.94%	Oceania	Polynesia
Saint Barthélemy (France)	10,920	11,085	+1.51%	Americas	Caribbean
Tuvalu	9,992	9,816	−1.76%	Oceania	Polynesia
Saint Pierre and Miquelon (France)	5,732	5,681	−0.89%	Americas	Northern America
Saint Helena (United Kingdom) (Note: Including Saint Helena, Ascension, and Tristan da Cunha.)	5,343	5,289	−1.01%	Africa	Western Africa
Montserrat (United Kingdom)	4,453	4,420	−0.74%	Americas	Caribbean
Falkland Islands (United Kingdom)	3,490	3,477	−0.37%	Americas	South America
Tokelau (New Zealand)	2,290	2,397	+4.67%	Oceania	Polynesia
Niue	1,821	1,817	−0.22%	Oceania	Polynesia
Vatican City (Note: Listed as Holy See.)	505	496	−1.78%	Europe	Southern Europe

== See also ==
=== World ===
- List of countries and dependencies by population
- List of countries by past and projected future population
  - List of countries by population in 1000
  - List of countries by population in 1500
  - List of countries by population in 1600
  - List of countries by population in 1700
  - List of countries by population in 1800
  - List of countries by population in 1900
  - List of countries by population in 1939
  - List of countries by population in 1989
  - List of countries by population in 2000
  - List of countries by population in 2005
  - List of countries by population in 2010
  - List of countries by population in 2015
- World population

=== Continental ===
- Demographics of Antarctica
- List of African countries by population
- List of Asian countries by population
- List of European countries by population
  - List of European countries by population growth rate
- List of North American countries by population
- List of Oceanian countries by population
- List of South American countries by population

=== Transcontinental ===
- List of Arab League countries by population
- List of countries in the Americas by population
  - List of Latin American countries by population
- List of Eurasian countries by population
- List of Middle Eastern countries by population

=== Subregional ===
- List of Caribbean countries by population

=== Others ===
- List of European Union member states by population
- List of member states of the Commonwealth of Nations by population
- List of population concern organizations
