= List of states by population in 1 CE =

Historical Demographics
Altar of Domitius Ahenobarbus
Articles
Demographic history
Historical demography
World population estimates
List of Countries by Population
500 BC	1	1000

This is a list of states by population in 1 C.E.

1. Han dynasty (22.6%)
2. Roman Empire (21.2%)
3. Satavahana dynasty (7.84%)
4. Parthian Empire (7.84%)
5. Xiongnu (0.78%)
6. Dacia (0.78%)
7. Mauretania (0.59%)
8. Kush (0.45%)
9. Maya (0.78%)
10. Bactria (0.39%)

Country/Territory	Population c. 1 C.E. estimate	Percentage of World Population
World	255,000,000	-
Han dynasty	57,671,400	22.62%
Roman Empire subdivisions: Egypt - 7,000,000; Syria - 4,300,000	54,000,000	21.18%
Satavahana dynasty	20,000,000	7.84%
Parthian Empire subdivisions: Iranian Plateau - 4,000,000; Seleucia - 600,000	20,000,000	7.84%
Xiongnu	2,000,000	0.78%
Dacia	2,000,000	0.78%
Kingdom of Mauretania	1,500,000	0.59%
Kingdom of Meroe (Kush)	1,150,000	0.45%
Mayan Polity subdivisions: El Mirador - 2,000,000	2,000,000	0.78%
Bactria subdivisions: Balkh - 100,000	1,000,000	0.39%

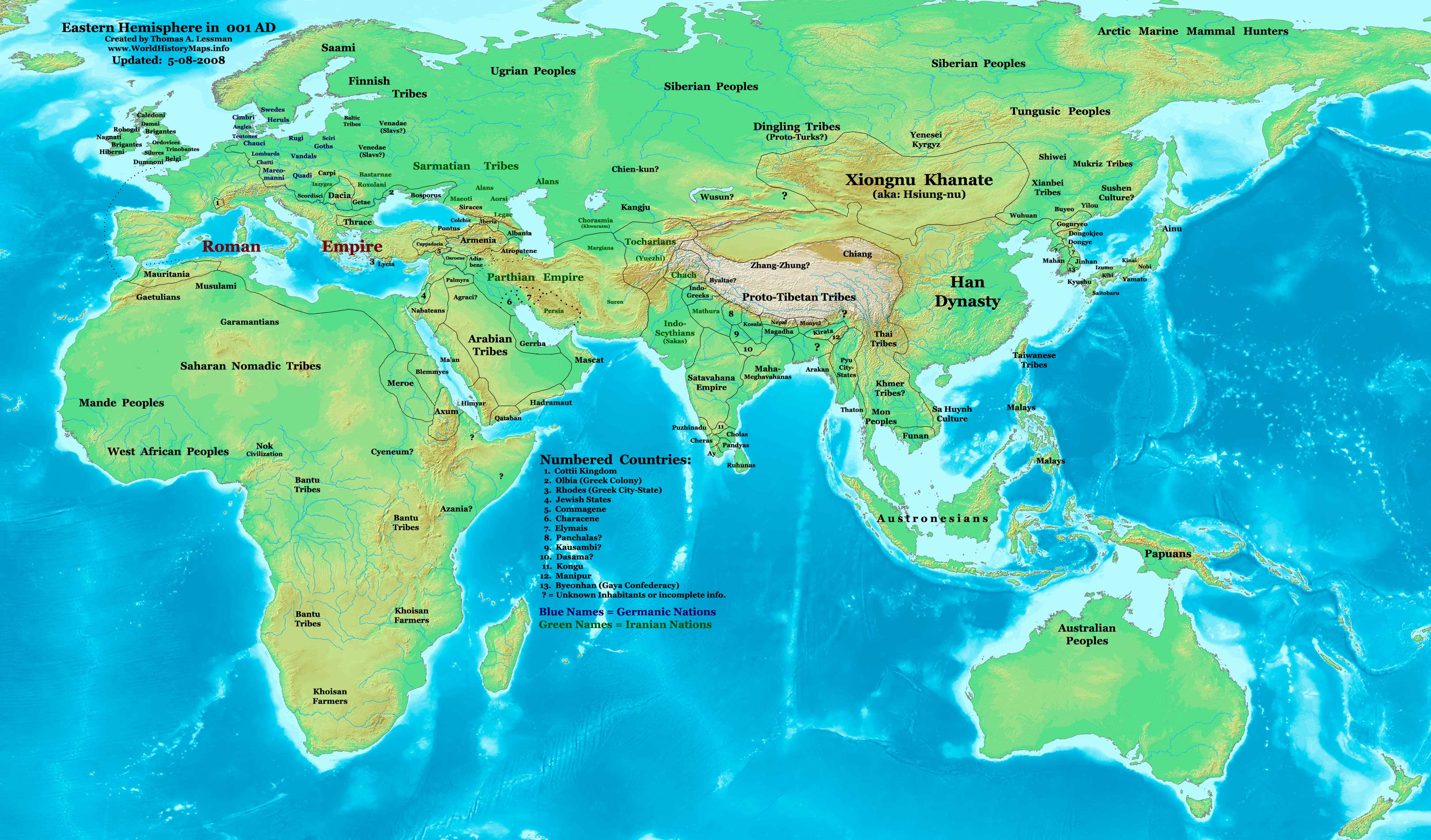

== Alternative Estimates of the Regional Components of World Population, 1 C.E. ==
	Europe (Including area of the former USSR)	Americas	Asia (including Australasia)	Africa	World
Clark	44,500,000	3,000,000	185,000,000	23,000,000	225,500,000
Durand	42,500,000	12,000,000	207,000,000	35,000,000	296,500,000
Biraben	43,000,000	12,000,000	171,000,000	26,000,000	252,000,000
Mc Evedy and Jones	32,800,000	4,500,000	114,200,000	16,500,000	168,700,000
Maddison	33,350,000	6,320,000	174,650,000	16,500,000	230,820,000

== See also ==
- List of countries by population
- List of countries by population in 1000
- List of countries by population in 1500
- List of countries by population in 1600
- List of countries by population in 1700
- List of countries by population in 1800
- List of political entities in the 1st century
