= List of countries by population in 1500 =

Historical demographics
Altar of Domitius Ahenobarbus
Articles
Demographic history
Historical demography Classical · Medieval
World population estimates
List of countries by population
1000	1500	1600

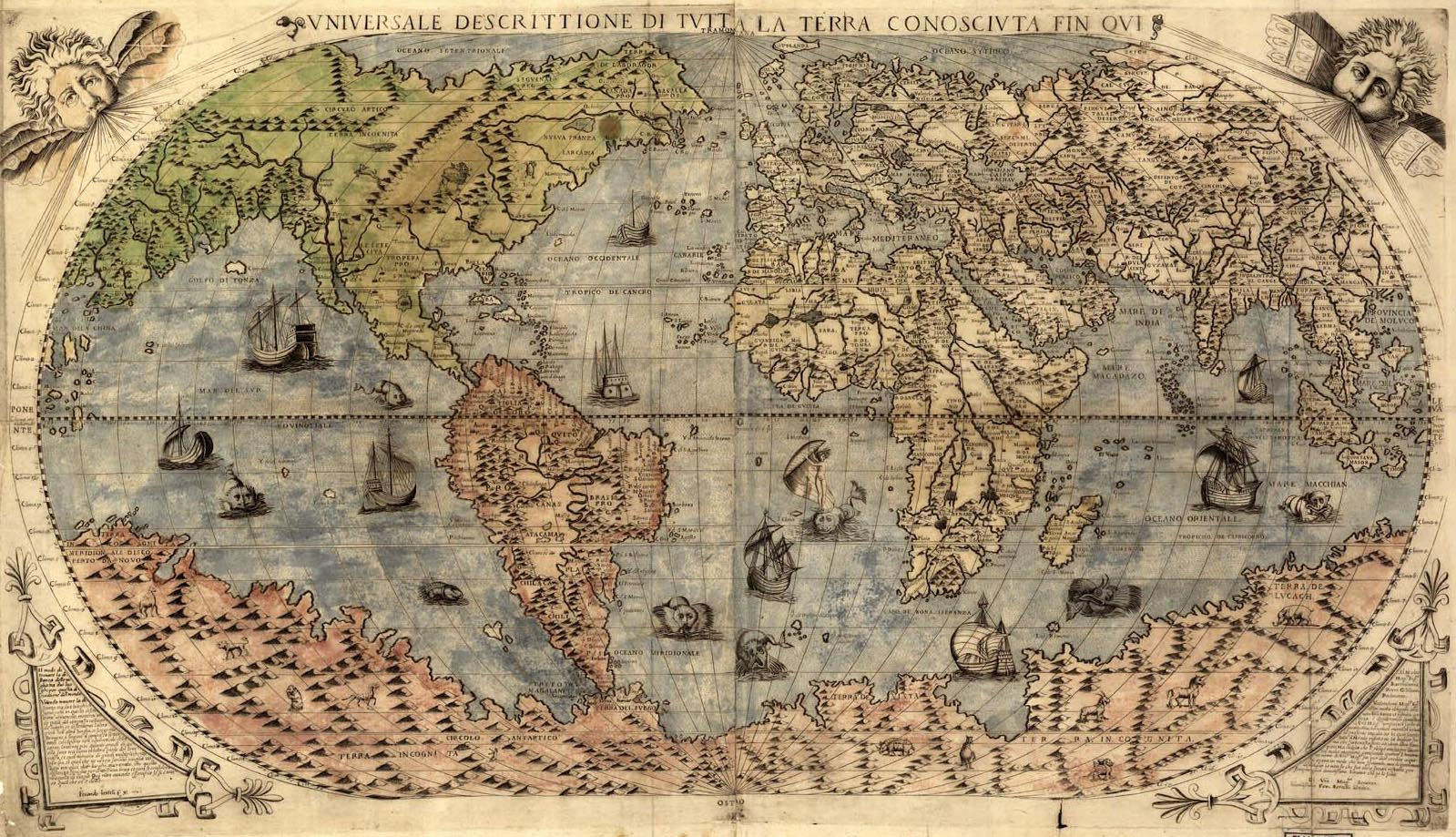
World map from 1565

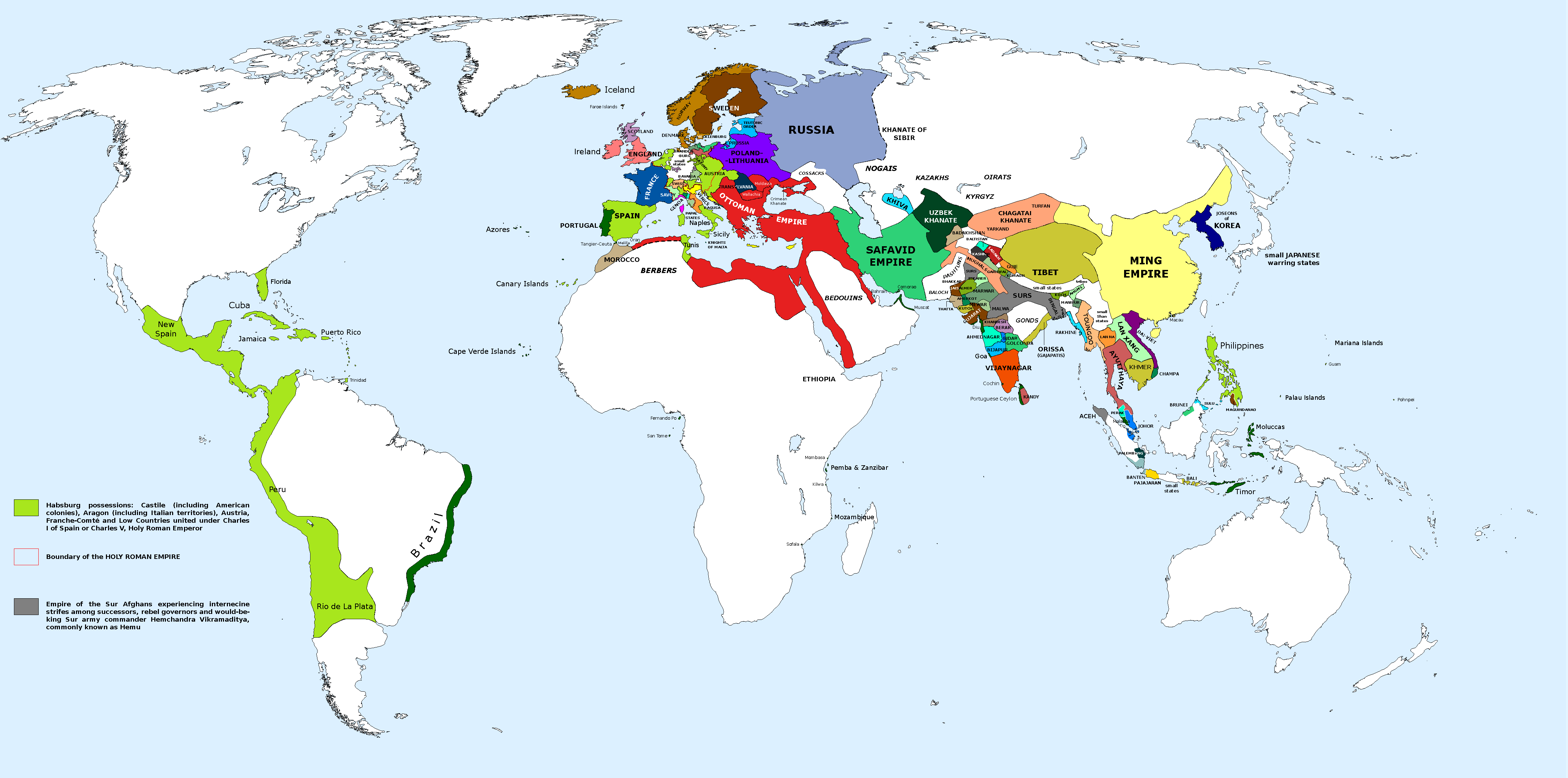
World map depicting 1555–1556

This is a list of countries by population in 1500. Estimate numbers are from the beginning of the year, and exact population figures are for countries that held a census on various dates in that year. The bulk of these numbers are sourced from Alexander V. Avakov's Two Thousand Years of Economic Statistics, Volume 1, pages 12 to 14, which cover population figures from the year 1500 divided into modern borders. Avakov, in turn, cites a variety of sources, mostly Angus Maddison.

== List ==
1. Ming China (23.5%)
2. Delhi Sultanate (12.6%)
3. Holy Roman Empire (5.30%)
4. Vijayanagara Empire (4.10%)
5. Kingdom of France (3.70%)
6. Ottoman Empire (2.80%)
7. Inca Empire (4.60%)
8. Bengal Sultanate (2.40%)
9. Ashikaga Japan (2.20%)
10. Joseon (2.10%)
11. Spanish Empire (2.00%)

Rank	Country/Territory	Population c. 1500 estimate	Percentage of world population
–	World	438,000,000	–
1	Ming China Subdivisions: Liaodong Regional Military Commission – ?; Dokham Regional Military Commission – ?; Hami Prefecture – ?; Sichuan Province Tusi – ?; Guizhou Province Tusi – ?; Guangxi Province Tusi – ?; Yunnan Province Tusi – ?; Chinese Shan States – ?	60,000,000–103,000,000	23.5%
2	Delhi Sultanate: Lodi dynasty	~55,000,000	~12.6%
3	Holy Roman Empire Subdivisions: Habsburg Netherlands – 2,400,000+; Bohemian Crown – 2,160,000; Archduchy of Austria and related territories – 2,000,000; Duchy of Milan – 1,250,000; Savoy – ?; Republic of Florence – 750,000; Republic of the Swiss – 745,000; Duchy of Bavaria – ~400,000; Duchy of Württemberg – ~350,000; Margraviate of Brandenburg – ~300,000; Saxony – ?; Margraviate of Baden – ?; Thuringian states – ?; Duchy of Carniola – 208,000; Landgraviate of Hesse – ?; Duchy of Mecklenburg-Schwerin – ?; County of Nassau – ?; Bishopric of Würzburg – ?; County of Oldenburg – ?; Duchy of Luxemburg – ?; Vogtland – ?; Principality of Lippe – ?; Mecklenburg – ?; Anhalt-Dessau – ?; Prince-Bishopric of Münster – ?; Anhalt-Dessau – ?; Anhalt-Köthen – ?; County of Schaumburg – ?; Liechtenstein – ?; Archbishopric of Salzburg- ?; Principality of Calenberg – ?; Electorate of Mainz – ?; Electorate of Trier – ?; Electorate of Cologne – ?; Electoral Palatinate – ?; Duchy of Brunswick-Luneburg – ?; Saxe-Lauenburg – ?; Archbishopric of Magdeburg – ?; Hamburg – ?; Lübeck – ?; Schleswig – ?; Holstein – ?; Bishopric of Lübeck – ?; Bishopric of Trent – ?; East Frisia – ?; Duchy of Pomerania – ?; Episcopal principality of Utrecht – ?; Principality of Ansbach – ?; Mixed Imperial City of Augsburg – ?; Duchy of Cleves – ?; Guelders – ?; Prince-Bishopric of Liège – ?	23,000,000+	5.3%
4	Vijayanagara Empire	18,000,000	4.1%
5	France and possessions Subdivisions: Kingdom of France – 15,000,000; Duchy of Milan – 1,250,000; Andorra – ?	16,250,000	3.7%
6	Ottoman Empire Subdivisions: Anatolia and East Thrace – 6,300,000; Serbia – 990,000; Bulgaria – 800,000; Bosnia Eyalet – 367,000; Albania – 200,000; Vassal states: Principality of Wallachia – 350,000; Crimean Khanate - 187,000 (17th century estimate)	12,640,000	2.8%
7	Inca Empire	12-32,000,000	−4.6%
8	Bengal Sultanate	10,526,000	2.4%
9	Ashikaga Japan	9,800,000	2.2%
10	Joseon	9,100,000-9,700,000; 9,412,000	2.1%
11	Spain and possessions Subdivisions: Crown of Castile – 7,000,000; Crown of Aragon - 950,000; Kingdom of Sicily – 600,000; Andorra – ?; Santo Domingo – 139,000	8,900,000	2.0%
12	Polish–Lithuanian Union Subdivisions: Kingdom of Poland – 3,900,000; Grand Duchy of Lithuania – ?; State of the Teutonic Order – ?	7,500,000	1.7%
13	Grand Duchy of Moscow	6,000,000	1.4%
14	Aztec Empire	6,000,000	1.4%
15	Mamluk Sultanate of Egypt Subdivisions: Mamluk Egypt – 4,000,000; Syria – 1,206,000; Palestine – 366,000; Lebanon – 299,000; Jordan – 196,000; Hejaz – ?; Libya – ?	5,867,000	1.3%
16	Lê dynasty (Đại Việt)	5,625,400	1.3%
17	Aq Qoyunlu Iran	~4,000,000	0.9%
18	Majapahit Empire (Note: Combined 17th-century population of Bali (600,000), half of Java (2,000,000), half of Borneo (200,000), one-third of Sumatra (223,000), and half of the Lesser Sunda Islands (300,000), plus several other minor islands and exclaves.)	Less than 4,000,000	0.9%
19	Union of Kingdom of Hungary and Kingdom of Croatia | Kingdom of Hungary | Kingdom of Croatia, without medieval Slavonia	3,000,000; 500,000	0.9%*
20	Morocco Wattasid dynasty	3,500,000	0.8%
21	Portugal and possessions Subdivisions: Kingdom of Portugal – 3,000,000; Ceuta – ?; Ksar es-Seghir – ?; Asilah – ?; El Jadida – ?; Portuguese Tangier – ?; Ouadane – ?; Safi – ?; Graciosa fortress – ?; Arguin – ?; Portuguese Cape Verde – ?; São Tomé Island – ?; Príncipe – ?; Annobón – ?; Bioko – ?; Elmina – ?; Portuguese Gold Coast – ?; Lakshadweep – ?; Madeira – ?; Azores – ?	3,000,000+	0.7%+
22	Northern Yuan	~2,760,000	0.6%
23	England and possessions Subdivisions: Kingdom of England – 2,100,000; Lordship of Ireland – 250,000 (Note: Only about 1/3 of Ireland was under the English Crown in 1500 (through direct control by the crown, such as The Pale, or through the Anglo-Irish Lords).); Wales – 400,000; Pale of Calais – ?	2,750,000	0.6%
24	Champa	2,500,000 (Note: At its height)	0.6%
25	Ayutthaya Kingdom (Siam)	2,000,000	0.5%
26	Muisca Confederation	2,000,000	0.5%
27	Papal States	2,000,000	0.5%
28	Ethiopian Empire	1,870,000	0.4%
29	Kalmar Union Subdivisions: Kingdom of Denmark – 600,000; Kingdom of Sweden – 550,000; Kingdom of Norway – 240,000; Finland – 300,000; Iceland- ?; Greenland – ?	1,690,000	0.4%
30	Republic of Venice Subdivisions: Venetian Italy – ?; Venetian Dalmatia – ?; Istria – ?; Venetian Albania – ?; Tinos – ?; Kingdom of Candia – ?; Duchy of the Archipelago; Ionian Islands under Venetian rule – ?; Venetian Cyprus – ?	1,500,000	0.3%
31	Kingdom of Tlemcen	1,500,000	0.3%
32	Cambodia	1,224,000	0.3%
33	Hafsid dynasty	800,000	0.2%
34	Republic of Florence	750,000	0.2%
35	Kingdom of Scotland	500,000	0.1%
36	Lan Xang	400,000	0.1%
37	Principality of Moldavia	400,000	0.1%
38	Malacca Sultanate (Note: Population was estimated to be between 65,000 – 200,000.)	135,000	0.03%
38	Republic of Ragusa	90,000	0.02%
39	Nan Madol (Saudeleur dynasty)	25,000	0.004%

== See also ==
- List of countries by population
- List of sovereign states in 1500
- List of countries by population in 1600
- List of countries by population in 1700

== Sources ==
- Li, Tana (1998). Nguyen Cochinchina: Southern Vietnam in the Seventeenth and Eighteenth Centuries. Cornell University Press. ISBN 9781501732577.
- Kurt Witthauer. Bevölkerung der Erde (1958)
- Calendario Atlante de Agostini, anno 99 (2003)
- The Columbia Gazetteer of the World (1998)
- Britannica Book of the Year: World Data (1997)
