= List of countries by population in 1000 =

Historical demographics
Altar of Domitius Ahenobarbus
Articles
Demographic history
Historical demography Classical · Medieval
World population estimates
List of Countries by Population
| 1 | 1000 | 1500 |

This is a list of countries by population in 1000. The bulk of these numbers are sourced from Alexander V. Avakov's Two Thousand Years of Economic Statistics, Volume 1, pages 12 to 14, which cover population figures from the year 1000 divided into modern borders. Avakov, in turn, cites a variety of sources, mostly Angus Maddison.

| Country/Territory | Population c. 1000 estimate | Percentage of World Population |
| World | 390,000,000 (Note: Estimates range from 250,000,000 to 400,000,000) | – |
|---|---|---|
| Song China | 32,500,000–80,000,000 | 19.23% |
| Chola Empire subdivisions: Chola Dynasty: Possibly between 3-4,000,000 (Total Indian continent accounted for 75M). Mandalams in the realm: *Cholamandalam; Jayankondacholamandalam; Kongumandalam; Parkavanmandalam; Pandyamandalam; Gangapadi; Tadigaipadi; Nulambapadi; Marayapadi; Mummudicholamandalam; Naduvilmandalam; Cities like Thanjavur had around 88,000 inhabitants | 4,000,000– 20,000,000 | 1.03%-5.13% |
| Pala Empire | Less than 16,000,000–17,000,000 | 4.10%-4.36% |
| Holy Roman Empire subdivisions: Kingdom of Germany – 5,900,000 constituents; Germany – 3,800,000; Duchy of Lower Lorraine – 900,000; Duchy of Carinthia – 800,000; Switzerland – 400,000; Kingdom of Italy – 5,400,000 | 11,300,000–12,700,000 | 3.26% |
| Fatimid Caliphate subdivisions: Egypt – 5,000,000; Syria-Palestine – 2,100,000; Algeria – 2,000,000; Tunisia – 1,500,000; Emirate of Sicily – 750,000; Libya – 500,000; Najd – ? | 12,500,000 | 3.21% |
| Roman Empire subdivisions: Anatolia – 7,100,000; Greece – 1,100,000; Catepanate of Ras – 630,000; Constantinople – 300,000; Cyprus – 150,000 | 12,000,000 | 3.08% |
| Western Chalukya Empire subordinate dynasties: Hoysala and Malenadu: est. 1,000,000 – 2,000,000; Seuna: est. 2,000,000 – 3,000,000; Kakatiya: est. 2,000,000 – 3,000,000; Alupas: est. around 500,000 | 9,000,000–10,000,000 | 2.44% |
| Buyid Persia subdivisions: Iran: 4,500,000; Iraq: 2,000,000 – 4,000,000 | 6,500,000–8,500,000 | 2.18% |
| Khitan Liao | 5,250,000–7,750,000 | 1.99% |
| Kingdom of France | 7,200,000 | 1.8% |
| Japan | 7,000,000 | 1.79% |
| Al-Andalus subdivisions: Spain – 4,500,000; Morocco – 2,500,000 | Less than 7,000,000 | 1.79% |
| Gurjara-Pratihara empire subdivisions: Gurjaras in Hindustan Possibly between 6-7,000,000 (Total Indian continent accounted for 75M); Cities; Chunar (Within Gurjara-Pratihara kingdom towards its end) – 66,000; Kannauj (Under Gurjara-Pratihara) – 72,000; Anhilvada (Under Solankis) – 100,000 | 6,000,000–7,000,000 | 1.79% |
| Kievan Rus' | 5,400,000 | 1.38% |
| Goryeo | 3,000,000–5,000,000 | 0.77%-1.28% |
| Toltec Empire subdivisions: Central Mexico – 4,500,000 | 4,500,000 | 1.15% |
| Khmer Empire (Note: Figures are for the areas of modern Laos and Cambodia. None of modern south Thailand is included.) subdivisions: Angkor – 761,663 | 4,000,000 | 1.0% |
| Wari Empire subdivisions: Peru – 3,000,000 | 3,000,000 | 0.77% |
| Bulgarian Empire subdivisions: Approximately present day: Bulgaria (Northern Bulgaria and Western Bulgaria accounting for around 2/3 of the country) – 500,000; Kosovo – 82,000; Macedonia – 132,000; Serbia – 630,000; Albania – 200,000; Montenegro – 43,000; Romania (Northern Dobruja, Wallachia and Moldavia accounting for around 2/3 of the country) – 500,000 | 2,087,000 | 0.54% |
| Makuria subdivisions: Northern Sudan – 2,000,000 | 2,000,000 | 0.51% |
| Pagan Kingdom | 1,500,000-2,000,000 | 0.38%-0.51% |
| Muisca Confederation | 1,300,000 | 0.33% |
| Principality of Hungary | 1,250,000 | 0.32% |
| Kingdom of England | 1,250,000 | 0.32% |
| Đại Cồ Việt | 1,200,000 | 0.31% |
| Poland | 1,000,000 | 0.26% |
| Alodia subdivisions: Central and Southern Sudan – 1,000,000 | 1,000,000 | 0.26% |
| Zagwe Kingdom subdivisions: Ethiopia – 1,000,000 | 1,000,000 | 0.26% |
| Duchy of Bohemia | 900,000 | 0.23% |
| High Kingship of Ireland | 630,000 | 0.15% |
| Kingdom of Denmark | 620,000 | 0.13% |
| Kingdom of Croatia | 412,000 | 0.11% |
| Kingdom of Sweden | 400,000 | 0.10% |
| Kingdom of Scotland | 300,000 | 0.08% |
| Duchy of Bosnia | 286,000 | 0.07% |
| Kingdom of Norway | 200,000 | 0.05% |
| Republic of Venice | 60,000 | 0.02% |

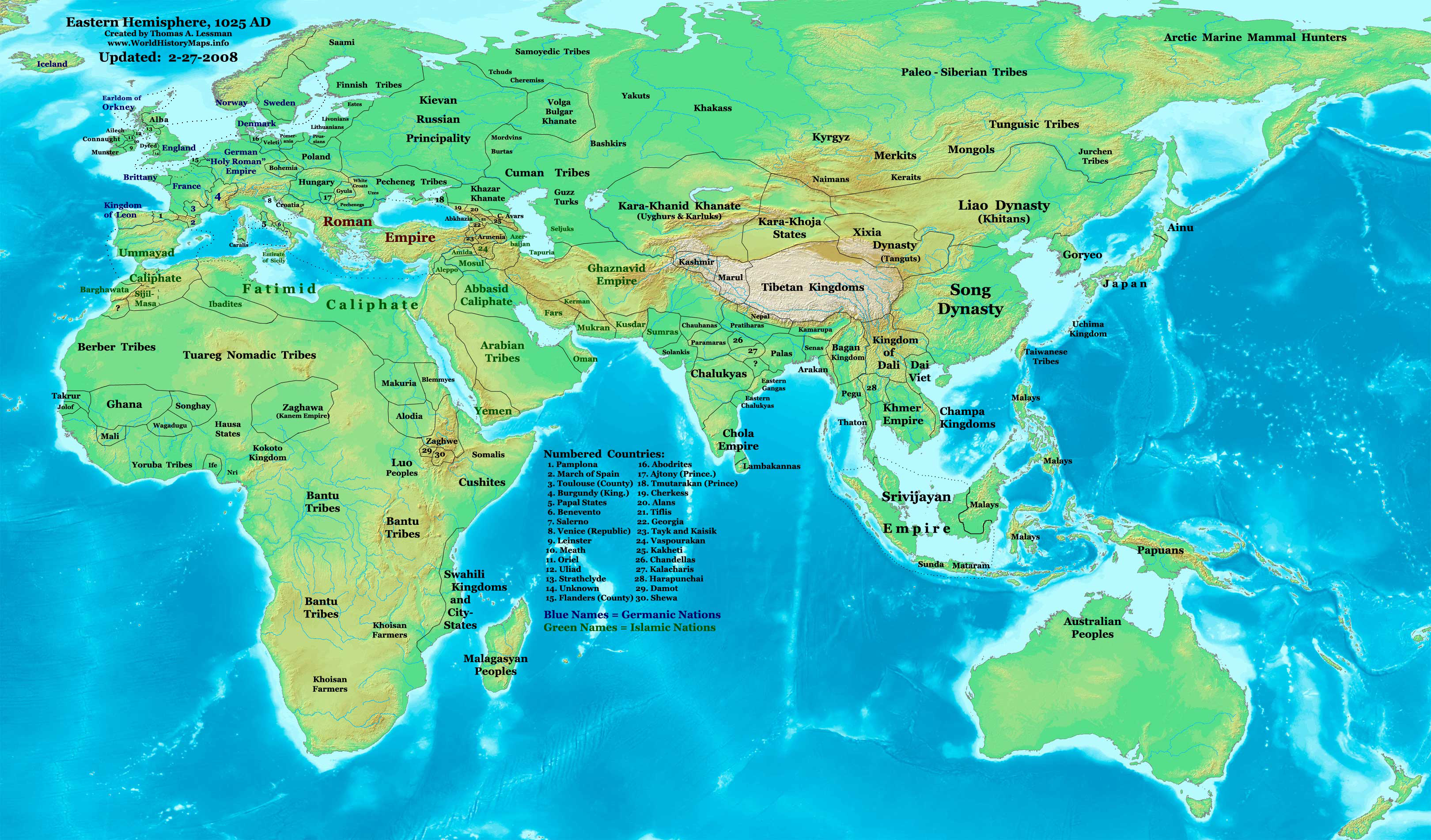
Eastern Hemisphere Map at 1025 CE

== See also ==
- List of countries by population
- List of countries by population in 1500
- List of countries by population in 1600
- List of political entities in the 10th century

== Bibliography ==
- Buringh, Eltjo (2010). Medieval Manuscript Production in the Latin West. Brill Publishers. ISBN 978-9004175198.
- Herlihy, David (1989), "Medieval Demography", in Strayer, Joseph R. (ed.), Dictionary of the Middle Ages, vol. 4, New York: Scribner, ISBN 0-684-17024-8.
- Kiernan, Ben (2019). Việt Nam: a history from earliest time to the present. Oxford University Press. ISBN 9780190053796.
- Bolt, Jutta, Robert Inklaar, Herman de Jong and Jan Luiten van Zanden (2018). "Maddison Project Database, version 2018".
- Urlanis, B T︠S︡ (1941). Rost naselenii︠a︡ v Evrope : opyt ischislenii︠a︡ [Population growth in Europe] (in Russian). Moskva: OGIZ-Gospolitizdat. OCLC 42379320.
