= List of countries by population in 1600 =

Historical demographics
Altar of Domitius Ahenobarbus
Articles
Demographic history
Historical demography Classical · Medieval
World population estimates
List of countries by population
1500	1600	1700

This is a list of countries by population in 1600. Estimate numbers are from the beginning of the year, and exact population figures are for countries that held a census on various dates in that year. The bulk of these numbers are sourced from Alexander V. Avakov's Two Thousand Years of Economic Statistics, Volume 1, pages 15 to 17, which cover population figures from the year 1600 divided into modern borders. Avakov, in turn, cites a variety of sources, mostly Angus Maddison. More specific numbers are given by other sources, and are noted as such in the citations.

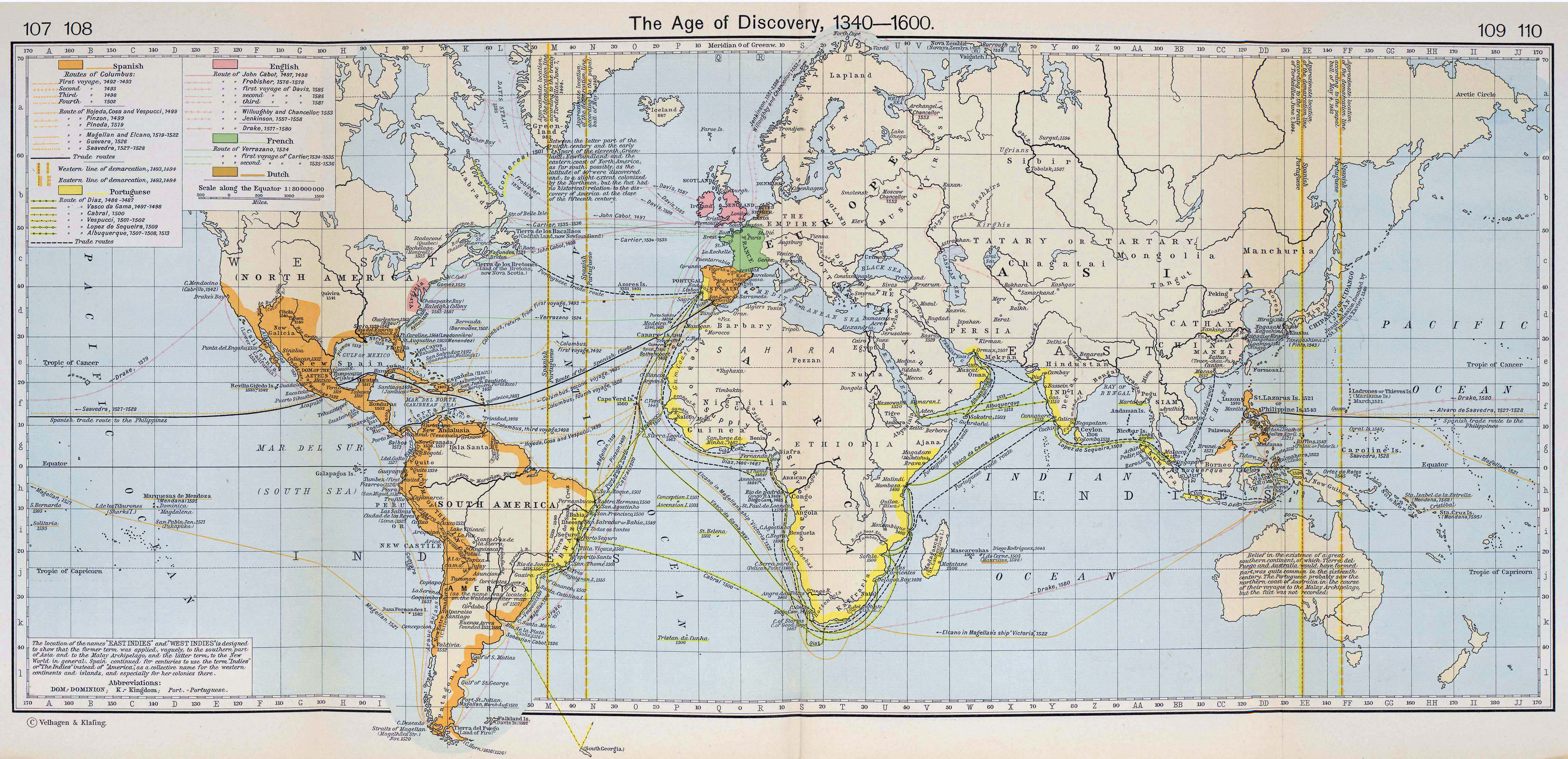

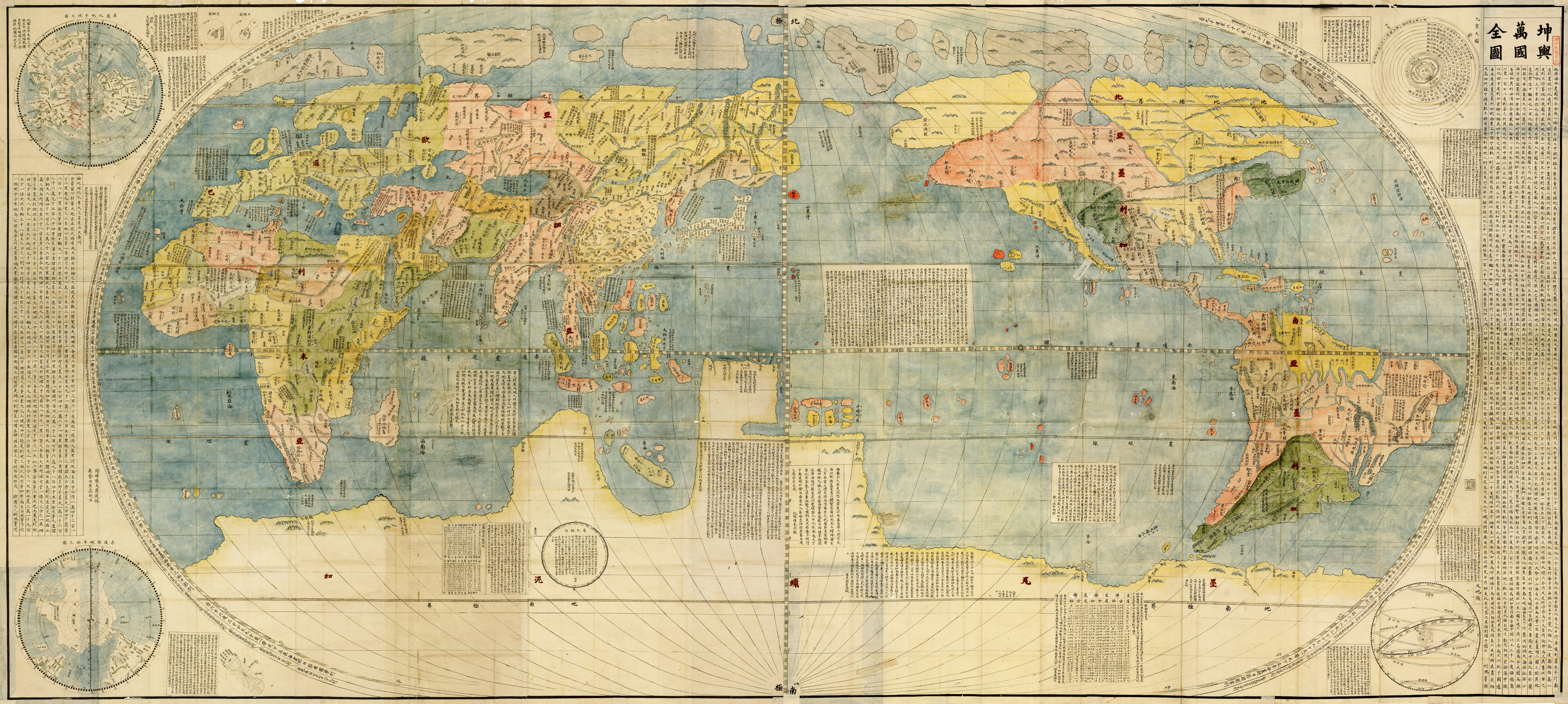

1. Ming dynasty 27.6%
2. Mughal Empire 19.9%
3. Holy Roman Empire 5.20%
4. Iberian Union 5.00%
5. Ottoman Empire 3.80%
6. Kingdom of France 3.30%
7. Others 35.2%

Country/Territory	Population c. 1600 estimate	Percentage of World Population
World	579,000,000	–
Ming Dynasty Subdivisions: Liaodong Regional Military Commission – ?; Dokham Regional Military Commission – ?; Sichuan Province Tusi – ?; Guizhou Province Tusi – ?; Guangxi Province Tusi – ?; Yunnan Province Tusi – ?; Chinese Shan States – ?	60,000,000–150,000,000	27.6%
Mughal Empire (Note: In 1600 the Mughals ruled roughly 50% of India, which had a population of 113 million at the time according to Avakov.) Subdivisions: Jaisalmer – ?; Bikaner – ?; Marwar – ?; Mewar – ?; Amber – ?; Dungarpur – ?; Kotah – ?; Gondi states – ?	~56,000,000	9.7%
Holy Roman Empire (Note: Combining Avakov's listed populations for Germany (16m), Austria (2.5m), Czechia (3.242m), Belgium (1.6m), Switzerland (1m), Slovenia (0.248m), and a third of Italy (4.3m) yields 28.9 million inhabitants; Avakov p. 15. This total does not include the Empire's various now-French territories such as Franche-Comté (6,300 square miles, ruled by the Spanish Habsburgs), the départements of Nord and Pas-de-Calais (4,800 square miles together, ruled by the Spanish Habsburgs as part of the Spanish Netherlands), Alsace (3,200 square miles), or the County of Nice (1,500 square miles, ruled by the Savoyards). While still claimed by the Emperor, this total also does not count the independent Dutch Republic. An estimate by the Austrian War Archives in the first decade of the 18th century (most scholars agree that the areas of the Empire covered had a similar population in both the early 17th and early 18th centuries) gives a population of 28 million for the German lands, Bohemia, and the Spanish Netherlands, which would add up to 33.5 million for the whole Empire in the early 17th century, excluding said now-French territories (Italian and Swiss populations listed below for their individual states). However, Benecke considers the Austrian War Archives figure to be "overgenerous." Yet another source gives a population of 20 million for "Germany, Austria, and Bohemia." Adding to that figure the already-listed ones for the Spanish Netherlands, Switzerland, and Italy equals a population of about 27 million, plus the French territories.) subdivisions: Bohemian Crown – 2,950,000; Archduchy of Austria (and related territories) – 2,500,000; Spanish Netherlands – 1,600,000+; Duchy of Milan – 1,350,000; Savoy – 1,200,000 (Note: A figure of 800,000 is given by Smith for "Savoy in Italy", with no clarification as to whether that refers to the whole Savoyard state or just its Italian territories of Piedmont and the Aosta Valley (thus excluding Savoy proper and the County of Nice). However another source gives early 17th century Piedmont's population as 700,000, and Savoy proper's as 400,000, with no numbers given for Aosta or Nice; indicating that Smith's use of "Savoy in Italy" does indeed only refer to Piedmont and Aosta.); Electorate of Saxony – 1,200,000; Republic of the Swiss – 1,000,000; Electorate of Bavaria – ~800,000; Republic of Genoa – 650,000; Grand Duchy of Tuscany – 648,000; Electoral Palatinate – ~600,000; Margraviate of Brandenburg- ~350,000; Duchy of Württemberg – ?; Duchy of Modena and Reggio – ~250,000; Duchy of Parma – ~250,000; Margraviate of Baden – ?; (Thuringia) Thuringian states – ?; Duchy of Carniola – 248,000; Landgraviate of Hesse-Kassel 230,000; Duchy of Holstein – 185,000; Republic of Lucca – 110,000; Landgraviate of Hesse-Darmstadt – 50,000; Duchy of Mecklenburg-Schwerin – ?; Nassau-Weilburg – ?; Prince-Bishopric of Würzburg – ?; County of Oldenburg – ?; (Luxembourg) Duchy of Luxemburg – ?; Imperial County of Reuss – ?; Principality of Lippe – ?; Duchy of Mecklenburg-Strelitz – ?; Anhalt-Dessau – ?; Arenberg – ?; Anhalt-Bernburg – ?; Anhalt-Köthen – ?; County of Schaumburg – ?; Liechtenstein – ?; Prince-Archbishopric of Salzburg- ?; Principality of Calenberg – ?; Electorate of Mainz – 100,000+; Franche-Comté – ?; Electorate of Trier – 100,000+; Electorate of Cologne – 100,000+; Duchy of Brunswick-Luneburg – ?; Saxe-Lauenburg – ?; Prince-Bishopric of Münster – ?; Archbishopric of Magdeburg – ?; Hamburg – ~20,000; Free City of Lübeck – ?; Duchy of Schleswig – ?; Prince-bishopric of Lübeck – ?; Prince-Bishopric of Trent – ?; Principality of Ansbach – ?	27,000,000+ – 34,000,000+	5.2%
Iberian Union and possessions subdivisions: Spanish America – c. 9,745,000; Kingdom of Spain – 8,240,000; Kingdom of Naples – 3,000,000; Spanish Netherlands (Belgium) – 1,600,000+; Duchy of Milan – 1,350,000; Kingdom of Portugal – 1,100,000; Kingdom of Sicily – 1,100,000; Captaincy General of the Philippines – 791,000; Franche-Comté – ?; (Kingdom of Portugal) Goa state – 250,000; (Kingdom of Portugal) Diu – ?; Viceroyalty of Sardinia – 300,000; (Kingdom of Portugal) Malacca – ~195,000; (Kingdom of Portugal) Viceroyalty of Brazil – 45,000; Bahrain – 54,000; Duchy of Luxemburg – ?; Andorra – ?	28,745,000+	5.0%
Ottoman Empire subdivisions: Anatolia and East Thrace – 7,275,000; Egypt Eyalet – 5,000,000; Regency of Algiers – 2,250,000; Greece – 1,500,000; Bulgaria – 1,250,000; Syria – 1,175,000; Iraq- 1,070,000; Serbia – 1,057,000; Beylik of Tunis – 1,000,000; Ottoman Hungary – 900,000; Regency of Tripoli – 500,000; Bosnia Eyalet – 449,000; Sidon Eyalet – 292,000; Palestine – 352,000; Cyprus – 98,000; Habesh Eyalet – ?; Ottoman Albania – 200,000; vassal states: Principality of Transylvania – 965,000; Principality of Moldavia - 440,000; Principality of Wallachia - 300,000; Crimean Khanate - 187,000; Sultanate of Aceh - ?	22,000,000	3.8%
Kingdom of France subdivisions: Kingdom of Navarre – ?; Andorra; Viscounty of Béarn	19,000,000	3.3%
Kingdom of Morocco and possessions (Note: The Songhai kingdom ruled roughly 1,400,000 sq km of land, or 540,543.022 sq miles in the 15th and 16th centuries. Around the same time, West Africa's population density was 20 persons per sq mile, an average between the estimates of Manning and Niane.) subdivisions: Pashalik of Timbuktu – 10,810,860; Morocco – 2,250,000	13,060,860	2.3%
Tokugawa Japan	12,000,000	2.1%
Joseon	11,722,000	~2.0%
Polish-Lithuanian Commonwealth subdivisions: Royal Prussia – ?; Duchy of Courland and Semigallia – ?; Duchy of Livonia – ?	~10,000,000	1.7%
Tsardom of Russia	9,000,000	1.6%
Habsburg Monarchy subdivisions: Bohemian Crown – 2,950,000; Archduchy of Austria – 2,100,000; Kingdom of Hungary – 1,800,000; Kingdom of Croatia – est. 647,000; Duchy of Carniola – 290,000	7,800,000	1.3%
Safavid Iran	Under 5,000,000 to near 10,000,000	1.3%
England and possessions subdivisions: Kingdom of England – 4,150,000; Kingdom of Ireland – 1,200,000; Wales – 250,000; Channel Islands – 20,000; Isle of Man – 5,000	5,600,000	1.0%
Lê dynasty (Đại Việt)	5,500,000	0.9%
Taungoo dynasty (Burma) (Note: (Lieberman 1984: 18): No large-scale censuses of any kind were conducted. Extant censuses from the period cover just four corridors of settlement in Lower Burma: Bassein-Myaungmya in the western delta; Martaban-Moulmein littoral; Myan Aung to Danubyu in the eastern delta; Pegu-Syriam-Dagon—capital region. (Lieberman 1984: 21–22): In 1581, a regional census of the 16 leading townships of Lower Burma showed a combined population of less than 28,000 households (~200,000 people). (Lieberman 1984: 20): The first-ever Irrawaddy valley-wide census was conducted only in 1638, and the results did not survive. Estimates above of the population of the empire point to over 6 million. In 1600, the most populous region of the erstwhile empire was Upper Burma (1.5 million), followed by the Shan high lands (1 million) and Lower Burma (0.5 million)—for a total of at least 5.5 million. Estimates for Lan Na, Lan Xang and Manipur are not known. The size of the population of the empire before the devastating wars of 1584–99 was probably over 6 million. The population of the Pegu capital region, according to a 1581 census, was only about 200,000.) subdivisions: Shan States – ?	3,500,000	0.6%
Ahom kingdom	2,000,000-3,000,000	0.3%-0.5%
Northern Yuan	~2,760,000	0.5%
Malla	2,750,000	0.5%
Ayutthaya Kingdom (Siam)	~2,500,000	0.4%
Ethiopian Empire	2,104,000	0.4%
Republic of Venice	2,000,000	0.3%
Kingdom of Kongo	2,000,000	0.3%
Jianzhou Jurchen Confederation	<2,000,000	0.3%
Papal States	1,704,500	0.3%
Dutch Republic	1,500,000	0.3%
Cambodia	1,419,000	0.2%
Sweden subdivisions: Kingdom of Sweden – 760,000; Grand Duchy of Finland- 500,000; Duchy of Estonia- 101,000	1,361,000	0.2%
Denmark–Norway subdivisions: Denmark – 650,000; Norway- 400,000; Iceland- 50,000; Greenland – ?	1,180,000	0.2%
Kingdom of Scotland	800,000	0.14%
Republic of Genoa	650,000	0.11%
Kingdom of Lan Xang	319,000	0.055%
Malay Sultanates of Johor, Kedah, Pattani, and Perak	<200,000 (together)	0.133%
Duchy of Urbino	150,000	0.100%
Kingdom of Mrauk U	160,000+ (Note: Southeast Asian polities were traditionally centered on the capital. The capital, Mrauk U, had a population of 160,000 in 1635.)	0.107%
Republic of Ragusa	60,000	0.010%
Arab Emirates	35,000	0.006%
Nan Madol (Saudeleur dynasty)	25,000	0.004%
Rapa Nui (Easter Island)	15,000	0.003%

The source used here calculates the said nations population by modern day borders, so the estimates are likely inaccurate.

== See also ==
- List of countries by population
- List of countries by population in 1000
- List of countries by population in 1500
- List of countries by population in 1700
- List of countries by population in 1800
- List of countries by population in 1900
