= List of member states of the Commonwealth of Nations by population =

This is a list of member states of the Commonwealth of Nations by population, which is sorted by the 2015 mid-year normalized demographic projections.

== Table ==
Rank	Country (or dependent territory)	July 1, 2015 projection	% of pop.	Average relative annual growth (%)	Average absolute annual growth	Estimated doubling time (Years)	Official figure (where available)	Date of last figure	Source
1	India	1,299,499,000	55.12	1.64	20,998,000	43	1,420,500,000	October 11, 2025	Official population clock
2	Pakistan	191,785,000	8.14	2.00	3,765,000	35	243,317,000	October 11, 2025	Official population clock
3	Nigeria	184,264,000	7.82	2.91	5,205,000	24	174,000,000	2013	Official estimate
4	Bangladesh	158,762,000	6.73	1.37	2,139,000	51	179,725,000	October 11, 2025	Official population clock
5	United Kingdom	65,093,000	2.76	0.77	495,000	91	64,596,800	June 30, 2014	Official estimate
6	South Africa	54,957,000	2.33	1.61	873,000	43	54,956,900	July 1, 2015	Official estimate
7	Tanzania	48,829,000	2.07	2.97	1,407,000	24	47,421,786	2014	Official estimate
8	Kenya	44,234,000	1.88	2.87	1,234,000	24	43,000,000	2014	Official estimate
9	Canada	35,819,000	1.52	0.79	279,000	89	42,698,700	October 11, 2025	Official estimate
10	Uganda	35,760,000	1.52	3.09	1,071,000	23	34,856,813	August 28, 2014	Preliminary 2014 census result
11	Malaysia	31,032,000	1.32	1.84	561,000	38	34,932,400	October 11, 2025	Official population clock
12	Ghana	27,714,000	1.18	2.48	671,000	28	27,043,093	2014	Official estimate
13	Mozambique	25,728,000	1.09	2.74	686,000	26	25,727,911	2015	Official estimate
14	Australia	23,792,000	1.01	1.42	333,000	49	28,082,100	October 11, 2025	Official population clock
15	Cameroon	21,918,000	0.93	2.65	565,000	27	21,917,602	2015	Official estimate
16	Sri Lanka	20,869,000	0.89	0.94	194,000	74	20,771,000	July 1, 2014	Official estimate
17	Malawi	16,307,000	0.69	3.18	502,000	22	16,832,900	July 1, 2016	Official estimate
18	Zambia	15,474,000	0.66	3.00	451,000	23	15,473,905	2015	Official estimate
19	Rwanda	11,324,000	0.48	2.61	288,000	27	10,515,973	August 15, 2012	Final 2012 census result
20	Papua New Guinea	8,219,000	0.35	3.11	248,000	23	7,744,700	2015	Official estimate
21	Sierra Leone	6,513,000	0.28	2.57	163,000	27	6,348,350	2014	Official estimate
22	Singapore	5,541,000	0.24	1.30	71,000	54	5,535,000	July 1, 2015	Official estimate
23	New Zealand	4,579,000	0.19	1.53	69,000	46	5,333,380	October 11, 2025	Official population clock
24	Jamaica	2,729,000	0.12	0.26	7,000	270	2,723,246	December 31, 2014	Official estimate
25	Namibia	2,281,000	0.10	2.01	45,000	35	2,280,700	July 1, 2015	Official estimate
26	Botswana	2,176,000	0.09	1.92	41,000	36	2,024,904	August 22, 2011	Final 2011 census result
27	Gambia	2,022,000		3.27	64,000	22	2,101,000	July 1, 2017	UN projection
28	Lesotho	1,908,000	0.08	0.21	4,000	330	1,894,194	2011	Official estimate
29	Trinidad and Tobago	1,357,000	0.06	0.52	7,000	134	1,349,667	2015	Official estimate
30	Mauritius	1,263,000	0.05	0.16	2,000	437	1,261,208	July 1, 2014	Official estimate
31	Eswatini (Swaziland)	1,119,000	0.05	1.18	13,000	59	1,119,375	2015	Official estimate
32	Fiji	867,000	0.04	0.46	4,000	150	867,000	2015	Official estimate
33	Cyprus	846,000	0.04	-0.94	-8,000	-	858,000	December 31, 2013	Official estimate
34	Guyana	747,000	0.03	0.00	0	-	747,884	September 15, 2012	Preliminary 2012 census result
35	Solomon Islands	587,000	0.02	2.26	13,000	31	642,000	2015	Official estimate
36	Malta	425,000	0.02	0.47	2,000	147	417,432	November 20, 2011	2011 census result
37	Brunei	421,000	0.02	1.69	7,000	41	393,162	June 20, 2011	Preliminary 2011 census result
38	Bahamas	379,000	0.02	1.34	5,000	52	369,670	2015	Official estimate
39	Belize	369,000	0.02	2.50	9,000	28	368,310	June 2015	Official estimate
40	Barbados	283,000	0.01	0.35	1,000	196	277,821	May 1, 2010	2010 census result
41	Vanuatu	278,000	0.01	2.58	7,000	27	277,600	2015	Official estimate
42	Samoa	193,000	0.01	0.52	1,000	133	194,899	2016	Official estimate
43	Saint Lucia	172,000	0.01	0.58	1,000	119	166,526	May 10, 2010	Preliminary 2010 census result
44	Kiribati	113,000	0.00	1.80	2,000	39	113,400	2015	Official estimate
45	Saint Vincent and the Grenadines	110,000	0.00	0.00	0	-	109,434	2014	Official estimate
46	Grenada	104,000	0.00	0.00	0	-	103,328	May 12, 2011	Preliminary 2011 census result
47	Tonga	104,000	0.00	0.00	0	-	103,300	2015	Official estimate
48	Seychelles	97,000	0.00	1.04	1,000	67	90,945	August 26, 2010	Final 2010 census result
49	Antigua and Barbuda	89,000	0.00	1.14	1,000	61	85,567	May 27, 2011	Final 2011 census result
50	Dominica	71,000	0.00	0.00	0	-	71,293	May 14, 2011	Preliminary 2011 census result
51	Saint Kitts and Nevis	46,000	0.00	0.00	0	-	46,204	May 15, 2011	2011 census result
52	Tuvalu	11,000	0.00	0.00	0	-	11,300	2015	Official estimate
53	Nauru	10,000	0.00	0.00	0	-	10,900	2015	Official estimate
	Total	2,357,512,000	100.00	1.37	42,433,000	64			

== See also ==
- List of countries by population
- List of countries by past and future population
