= List of countries by population in 1700 =

Historical demographics
Altar of Domitius Ahenobarbus
Articles
Demographic history
Historical demography Classical · Medieval
World population estimates
List of countries by population
1600	1700	1800

This is a list of countries by population in 1700. Estimated numbers are from the beginning of the year and exact population figures are for countries that held a census on various dates in the 1700s. The bulk of these numbers are sourced from Alexander V. Avakov's Two Thousand Years of Economic Statistics, Volume 1, pages 18 to 20, which cover population figures from the year 1700 divided into modern borders. Avakov, in turn, cites a variety of sources, primarily Angus Maddison.

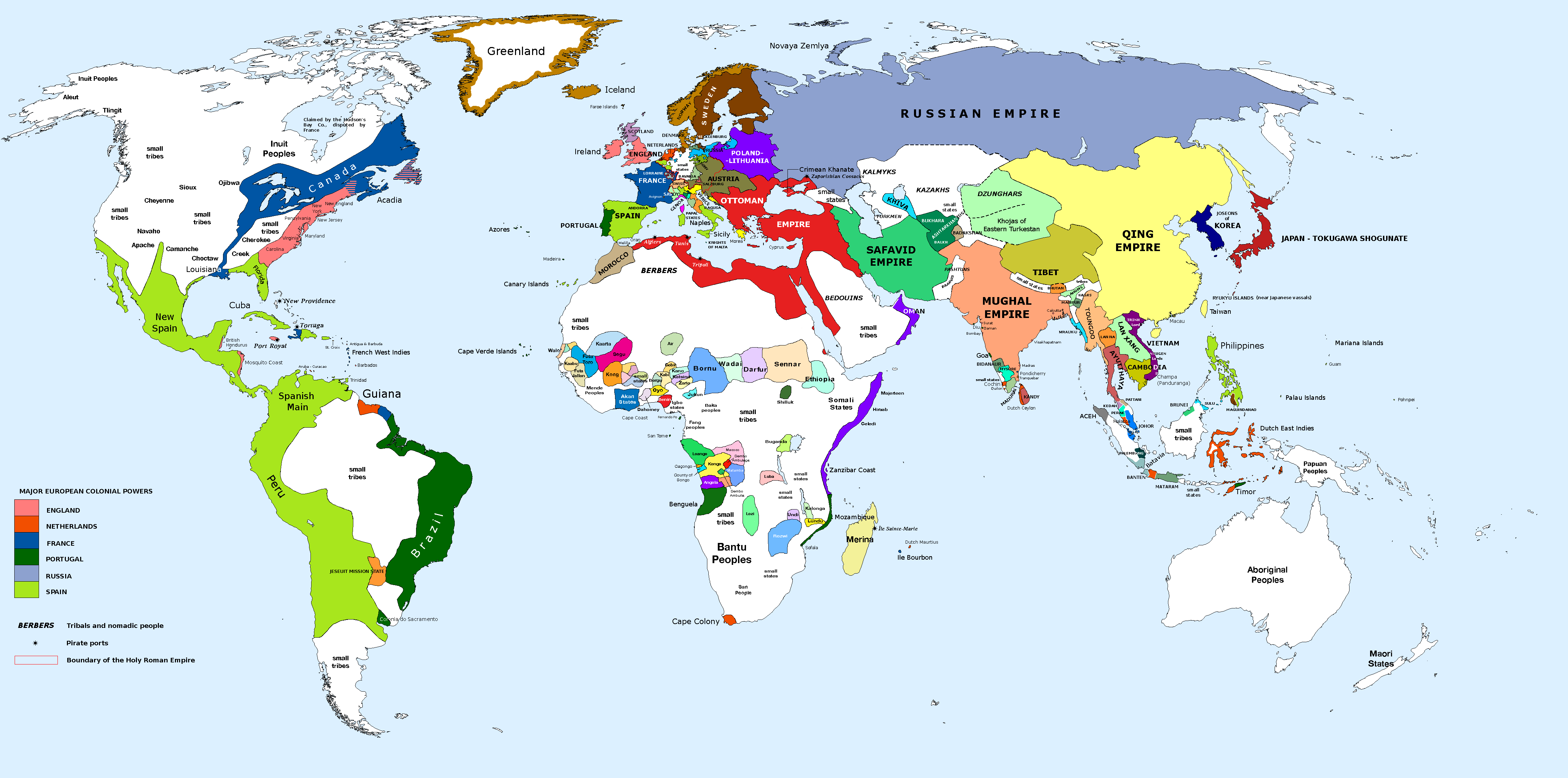

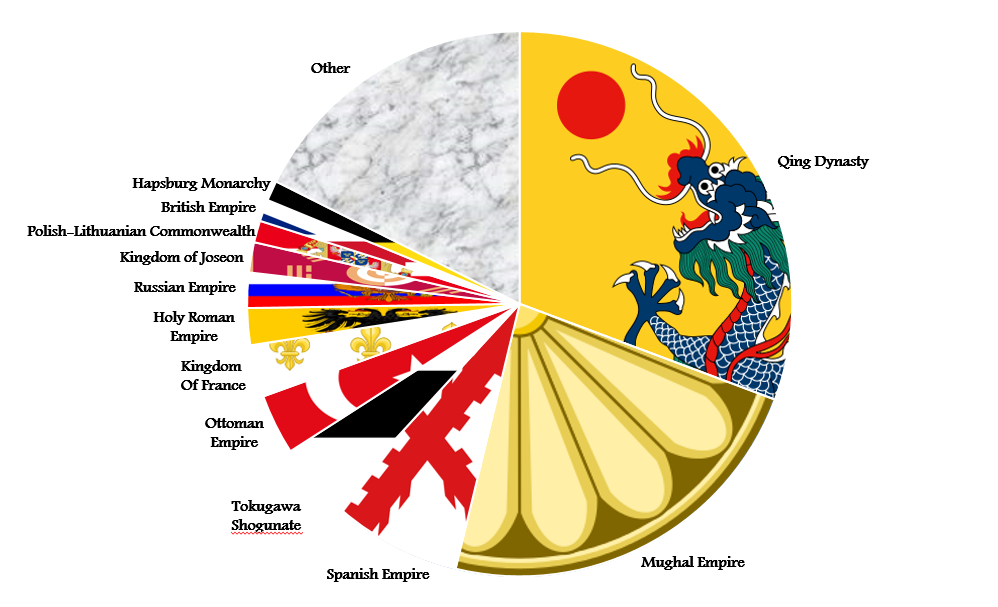

Country/Territory	Population estimate c. 1700	Percentage of World Population
World	682,300,000	–
Mughal Empire Subdivisions: Bengal Subah; Jaisalmer – ?; Bikaner – ?; Marwar – ?; Mewar – ?; Amber – ?; Dungarpur – ?; Kotah – ?; Gondi states – ?	158,400,000	23%
Qing Empire Subdivisions: Outer Mongolia Governorate – 619,000; Kumul Khanate – ?; Sichuan Province Tusi – ?; Guizhou Province Tusi – ?; Guangxi Province Tusi – ?; Yunnan Province Tusi – ?; Taiwan – ?	100,000,000–150,000,000	22%
Ottoman Empire subdivisions: Anatolia – 8,400,000; Ottoman Egypt – 5,400,000; vassal states: Principality of Wallachia – 600,000; Principality of Moldavia - 480,000; Crimean Khanate - 187,000 (mid-17th century estimate)	27,519,000	4.0%
Holy Roman Empire subdivisions: (Kingdom of Bohemia) Bohemian Crown – 3,242,000; Spanish Netherlands – 2,000,000+; Archduchy of Austria – 2,500,000; Saxony – 2,000,000; Savoyard state – 1,396,000; Electorate of Bavaria – 1,000,000; Margraviate of Brandenburg – ~1,000,000; Grand Duchy of Tuscany – ~1,000,000; Duchy of Milan – ?; Duchy of Württemberg – 340,000; Margraviate of Baden – ?; Thuringian states – ?; Hesse-Darmstadt – ?; Duchy of Mecklenburg-Schwerin – ?; Nassau – ?; Bishopric of Würzburg – ?; County of Oldenburg – ?; Luxembourg – ?; Reuss Elder Line – ?; Principality of Lippe – ?; Duchy of Mecklenburg-Strelitz – ?; Anhalt-Dessau – ?; Arenberg – ?; Anhalt-Bernburg – ?; Anhalt-Köthen – ?; Principality of Schaumburg-Lippe – ?; Liechtenstein – ?; Archbishopric of Salzburg- ?; Electorate of Hanover – ?; Mainz – ?; Trier – ?; Cologne – 39,000; Electoral Palatinate – ?; Brunswick-Luneburg – 350,000; Saxe-Lauenburg – ?; Münster – ?; Magdeburg – ?; Hamburg – 70,000; Hesse-Homburg – ?; Lübeck – ?; Schleswig – ?; Holstein – ?; Bishopric of Lübeck – ?; Principality of Ansbach – ?	27,400,000	4.0%
Tokugawa Japan	27,000,000	4.0%
Spain and possessions subdivisions: Kingdom of Spain – 8,770,000; (Spanish Empire) New Spain – 4,500,000; Spanish Netherlands – 2,000,000+; Kingdom of Naples – 3,300,000; New Granada – 1,500,000; (Spanish Empire) Peru – 1,300,000; (Spanish Empire) Chile – 800,000; Kingdom of Sicily – 700,000; Río de la Plata – 450,000; Philippines – 400,000; (Spanish Empire) Provincias Internas – 300,000; Louisiana – 250,000; Cuba – 200,000; Guatemala – 150,000; (Spanish Empire) Yucatán – 100,000; Puerto Rico – 80,000	24,530,000	3.6%
France	21,471,000	3.1%
Tsardom of Russia	13,616,000	2.0%
Joseon	13,500,000	2.0%
Safavid Iran	10,000,000	1.5%
Habsburg monarchy subdivisions: Kingdom of Hungary – 4,000,000; Kingdom of Bohemia – 3,242,000; Archduchy of Austria – 2,500,000; Principality of Transylvania – 800,000; Kingdom of Croatia – 647,000; Duchy of Carinthia – 248,000; Kingdom of Slavonia – ?	9,989,000	1.5%
England, Scotland, and possessions subdivisions: Kingdom of England – 5,108,500; Kingdom of Ireland – 2,060,051; Kingdom of Scotland – 1,200,000; Wales – 366,500; British America – 250,888 constituents; Colony of Virginia – 58,560; Province of Massachusetts Bay – 55,941; Province of Maryland – 29,604; Connecticut Colony – 25,970; Province of New York – 19,107; Province of Pennsylvania – 17,950; Province of Carolina – 16,424; East Jersey and West Jersey – 14,010; Colony of Rhode Island and Providence Plantations – 5,894; Province of New Hampshire – 4,958; Delaware Colony – 2,470; Bermuda – ?; Newfoundland Colony – ?; Rupert's Land – ?; British West Indies – 145,300 constituents; Barbados – 65,500; Colony of Jamaica – 49,300; Leeward Islands – 30,500; British East India Company; Madras Presidency - 400,000	9,531,239	1.4%
Polish–Lithuanian Commonwealth	9,000,000	1.3%
Lê dynasty (Đại Việt)	8,000,000	1.2%
Morocco and possessions subdivisions: Pashalik of Timbuktu – ?	4,000,000	0.5%
Portuguese Empire subdivisions: Portugal – 2,000,000; (Portuguese Empire) Portuguese East Africa – 1,500,000; Colonial Brazil – 300,000; (Portuguese Empire) State of Maranhão – ?; (Portuguese Empire) Portuguese North Africa – ? (Note: El Jadida, Portuguese Cape Verde); (Portuguese Empire) Portuguese West Africa – ? (Note: São Tomé Island, Príncipe, Annobón Province, Bioko, Portuguese Angola, Cacheu, Ziguinchor, Ouidah, Bissau); (Portuguese Empire) Portuguese India – ?; (Portuguese Empire) Portuguese Macau – ?; (Portuguese Empire) Portuguese Timor – ?; (Portuguese Empire) Colonia del Sacramento – ?	3,800,000+	0.6%+
Nepal	3,064,000	0.4%
Ahom kingdom	2,000,000-3,000,000	0.3%-0.4%
Sweden subdivisions: Kingdom of Sweden – 1,700,000; Finland- 600,000; Estonia- 160,000; Bremen-Verden – 50,000; Karelia – 100,000; Ingria – 30,000; Livonia – 200,000; Riga – 60,000; Western Pomerania – 100,000	3,000,000	0.4%
Ayutthaya Kingdom (Siam)	2,500,000	0.4%
Ethiopian Empire	2,338,000	0.3%
Brandenburg-Prussia subdivisions: Duchy of Prussia – ?; Margraviate of Brandenburg- ?	1,500,000	0.2%
Dutch Republic subdivisions: Dutch Republic – 1,794,000; Dutch East India Company- ?; Dutch West India Company- ?	1,794,000	0.3%
Cambodia	1,650,000	0.2%
Savoyard state subdivisions: Piedmont – 950,000; Savoy – 300,000; Aosta – 70,000; Nice – 60,000; Oneglia – 16,000	1,396,000	0.2%
Denmark–Norway subdivisions: Denmark – 745,000; Norway – 540,000; Iceland – 50,400; Danish India – 15,000; Greenland – 5,000	1,300,400	0.2%
Swiss Confederacy	1,260,000	0.2%
Rozvi Empire	1,000,000+	0.1%
Dzungaria	1,000,000	0.1%
Grand Duchy of Tuscany	~1,000,000	0.1%
Kingdom of Kongo	790,000	0.12%
Lan Xang	371,000	0.05%
Ryukyu Kingdom	141,187	0.02%
Hospitaller Malta	50,000	0.01%
Rapa Nui (Easter Island)	3,000-4,000	0.0004%-0.001%

== See also ==
- List of countries by population
- List of countries by population in 1300
- List of countries by population in 1400
- List of countries by population in 1500
- List of countries by population in 1600
- List of countries by population in 1700
- List of countries by population in 1800
- List of countries by population in 1900
