= List of sovereign states in 1500 =

== Sovereign states ==
=== A ===
- Abazinia – Abazinia
- Aceh – Aceh Sultanate
  Capital: Kutaraja
- Adal – Adal Sultanate
  Capital: Dakkar
- Ahmadnagar – Ahmadnagar Sultanate
  Capital: Ahmadnagar
- Ahom – Ahom Kingdom
- Airgíalla
- Ailech
- Aïr – Terene Sultanate of Aïr (to 1500)
  Capital: Agadez
- Ajuran – Ajuran Sultanate
  Capital: Mareeg
- Ağ Qoyunlu – Ağ Qoyunlu Confederation
  Capital: Tabriz
- Alodia – Alodia
  Capital: Soba
- Andorra – Principality of Andorra
  Capital: Andorra la Vella
- Astrakhan – Khanate of Astrakhan
  Capital: Xacitarxan
- Ava – Kingdom of Ava
  Capital: Ava
- Avar – Avar Khanate
  Capital: Khunzah
- Ayutthaya – Ayutthaya Kingdom
  Capital: Ayutthaya (city)
- Aztec – Aztec Empire
  Capital: Tenochtitlan
  - Tenochtitlan
  - Texcoco
  - Tlacopan

=== B ===
- Bamum – Kingdom of Bamum
  Capital: Fumban
- Banu Sulaym
- Bahmani – Bahmani Kingdom (undergoing breakup)
  Capital: Bidar
- Bastar – Bastar State
  Capital: Jagdalpur
- Benin – Benin Empire
  Capital: Edo
- Bengal – Sultanate of Bengal
  Capital: Gaur
- Berar – Berar Sultanate
  Capital: Ellichpur
- Bidar – Bidar Sultanate
  Capital: Bidar
- Bijapur – Adil Shahi dynasty of the Bijapur Sultanate
  Capital: Bijapur
- Bikaner
  Capital: Bikaner
- Bonoman
  Capital: Begho
- Borgu – Kingdom of Borgu
  Capital: New Bussa
- Bornu – Bornu Empire
  Capital: Ngazargamu
- Brunei – Bruneian Sultanate
  Capital: Bandar Seri Begawan
- Buganda – Kingdom of Buganda
  Capital: Mengo
- Bundi – Bundi State
- Butua – Kingdom of Butua
  Capital: Khami
- Butuan – Rajahnate of Butuan
  Capital: Butuan
- Bunyoro – Kingdom of Bunyoro-Kitara

=== C ===
- Caboloan
  Capital: Binalatongan
- Cambodia
  Capital: Chaktomuk
- Chamba
  Capital: Chamba
- Champa – Chăm Pa
  Capital: Panduranga
- China – Great Ming
  Capital: Nanjing
  Capital: Jingshi
- Chutiya – Chutiya Kingdom
  Capital: Sadiya
- Circassia
  Capital: Sochi
- Clandeboye
- Cospaia - Republic of Cospaia
  Capital: Cospaia
- Cutch – Cutch State
  Capital: Lakhiarviro

=== D ===
- Damot – Kingdom of Damot
- Đại Việt
  Capital: Dong Kinh
- Dawro – Kingdom of Dawro
- Delhi – Delhi Sultanate
  Capital: Delhi
- Demak – Sultanate of Demak
  Capital: Bintara
- Denkyira
  Capital: Dunkwa-on-Offin
- Desmond – Kingdom of Desmond
  Capital: Cahersiveen
- Denmark – Kingdom of Denmark
  Capital: Copenhagen
- Dizak – Principality of Dizak
- Dulkadirids – Beylik of Dulkadir
  Capital: Maraş

=== E ===
- England – Kingdom of England
  Capital: London
- Ethiopia – Ethiopian Empire

=== F ===
- Fermanagh
  Capital: Lisnaskea
- France – Kingdom of France
  Capital: Paris

=== G ===
- Gajapati – Gajapati dynasty, Odisha
  Capital: Cuttack
- Garhwal – Kingdom of Garhwal
  Capital: Devalgarh
- Genoa – Republic of Genoa
  Capital: Genoa
- Gowa – Sultanate of Gowa
  Capital: Sungguminasa
- Great Fulo – Empire of Great Fulo
  Capital: Anyam-Godo
- Golden Horde – Golden Horde
  Capital: Sarai Batu
- Gujarat – Gujarat Sultanate
  Capital: Muhammadabad

=== H ===
- Hanthawaddy – Hanthawaddy Kingdom
  Capital: Hanthawaddy
- Hausa Kingdoms
- Hawwara
- Holy Roman Empire (high decentralized limited elective monarchy)
- Hungary – Kingdom of Hungary
  Capital: Buda

=== I ===
- Igala – Kingdom of Igala
  Capital: Idah
- Imereti – Kingdom of Imereti
  Capital: Kutaisi
- Inca – Inca Empire
  Capital: Cusco
- Iroquois – Iroquois Confederacy
  Capital: Onondaga

=== J ===
- Jaffna – Kingdom of Jaffna
  Capital: Nallur
- Jailolo – Sultanate of Jailolo
  Capital: Jailolo
- Jaintia – Kingdom of Jaintia
  Capital: Jaintia Rajbari
- Jaisalmer – Kingdom of Jaisalmer
  Capital: Jaisalmer
- Janjero – Kingdom of Janjero
  Capital: Fofa
- Japan – Ashikaga Shogunate
  Capital: Kyoto
- Jolof – Jolof Empire
  Capital: Linguère
- Joseon – Kingdom of Great Joseon
  Capital: Hanseong
- Jumla – Kingdom of Jumla

=== K ===
- Kabardia – Princedom of Kabardia
  Capital: Nalchik
- Kachari – Kingdom of Kachari
  Capital: Maibang
- Kaffa – Kingdom of Kaffa
  Capital: Anderaccha
- Kakheti – Kingdom of Kakheti
  Capital: Gremi
- Kakongo – Kingdom of Kakongo
  Capital: Kinguele
- Kalahandi – Kalahandi State
  Capital: Bhawanipatna
- Kamata – Kingdom of Kamata
- Kandy – Kingdom of Kandy
  Capital: Kandy
- Kangleipak – Kangleipak State
- Kangra – Kingdom of Kangra
- Kanker – Kanker State
  Capital: Kanker
- Kartli – Kingdom of Kartli
  Capital: Tbilisi
- Kashmir – Shah Mir Dynasty of Kashmir
- Kazakh – Kazakh Khanate
  Capital: Turkistan
- Kazan – Khanate of Kazan
  Capital: Kazan
- Khachen – Principality of Khachen
  Capital: Haterk
- Kilwa – Kilwa Sultanate
- Knights Hospitaller – Order of Saint John
  Capital: Rhodes
- Kongo – Kingdom of Kongo
  Capital: M'banza-Kongo
- Kotte – Kingdom of Kotte
  Capital: Sri Jayawardenepura Kotte
- Kumaon – Kingdom of Kumaon
  Capital: Champawat
- Kutai – Kutai Kartanegara Sultanate
  Capital: Pemarangan
- Kwararafa – Kwararafa Confederacy
  Capital: Wukari

=== L ===
- Ladakh – Namgyal dynasty of Ladakh
- Lan Na – Lanna Kingdom
  Capital: Chiang Mai
- Lan Xang
  Capital: Luang Prabang
- Lithuania – Grand Duchy of Lithuania
  Capital: Vilnius
- Luwu – Kingdom of Luwu
  Capital: Wara

=== M ===
- Madja-as – Confederation of Madja-as
  Capital: Irong-Irong
- Magh Luirg
- Majapahit – Majapahit Empire
  Capital: Majapahit
- Malacca – Malay Sultanate of Malacca
  Capital: Malacca
- Maldives – Sultanate of the Maldives
  Capital: Malé
- Mali – Mali Empire
  Capital: Niani
- Malla – Malla Confederacy (divided into three kingdoms since 1482)
- Malwa – Malwa Sultanate
  Capital: Mandu
- Mamluk – Mamluk Sultanate of Cairo
  Capital: Cairo
- Mandara – Kingdom of Mandara
- Mankessim – Kingdom of Mankessim
  Capital: Mankessim
- Maravi – Kingdom of Maravi
  Capital: Manthimba
- Marwar – Kingdom of Marwar
  Capital: Jodhpur
- Mayas – Maya civilization
- Maynila – Kingdom of Maynila
- Medri Bahri – Land of the Sea
  Capital: Debarwa
- Mewar – Mewar Kingdom
  Capital: Chittor
- Mewat – Mewat State
  Capital: Alwar
- Moghulistan
  Capital: Almaliq
- Morocco – Wattasid dynasty of Morocco
  Capital: Fes
- Mossi Kingdoms
- Mrauk U – Kingdom of Mrauk U
  Capital: Mrauk U
- Muisca Confederation
- Muscovy – Grand Duchy of Muscovy
  Capital: Moscow
- Mustang – Kingdom of Mustang
  Capital: Lo Manthang
- Mutapa – Kingdom of Mutapa
  Capital: Zvongombe

=== N ===
- Namayan - Kingdom of Namayan
  Capital: Sapa
- Naples – Kingdom of Naples
  Capital: Naples
- Navarre – Kingdom of Navarre
  Capital: Pamplona
- Nogai – Nogai Horde
  Capital: Saray-Jük
- Noli – Republic of Noli
  Capital: Noli
- Nri – Kingdom of Nri
  Capital: Igbo-Ukwu
- Nupe – Kingdom of Nupe
  Capital: Bida

=== O ===
- Oirat – Four Oirat
- Oman – Imamate of Oman
  Capital: Nizwa
- Osraige
  Capital: Kilkenny
- Ottoman Empire
  Capital: Constantinople
- Oyo – Oyo Empire
  Capital: Oyo-Ile

=== P ===
- Pagaruyung – Kingdom of Pagaruyung
  Capital: Pagaruyung
- Papal States - State of the Church
  Capital: Rome
- Patna – Patna State
  Capital: Balangir
- Poland – Kingdom of Poland
  Capital: Kraków
- Portugal – Kingdom of Portugal
  Capital: Lisbon
- Prome – Kingdom of Prome
  Capital: Pyay
- Pskov – Republic of Pskov
  Capital: Pskov

=== R ===
- Ragusa – Republic of Ragusa
  Capital: Ragusa
- Ramazanids – Emirate of Ramadan
  Capital: Adana
- Rapa Nui – Kingdom of Rapa Nui
  Capital: Te Peu
- Rwanda – Kingdom of Rwanda
  Capital: Nyanza
- Ryazan – Principality of Ryazan
  Capital: Ryazan
- (Ryukyu Kingdom) Ryukyu – Ryukyu Kingdom
  Capital: Shuri

=== S ===
- Saloum – Kingdom of Saloum
  Capital: Kahone
- Samtskhe – Samtskhe Atabegate
  Capital: Akhaltsikhe
- Samudera Pasai – Samudera Pasai Sultanate
  Capital: Pasai
- San Marino – Republic of San Marino
  Capital: City of San Marino
- Saudeleur – Saudeleur dynasty
  Capital: Nan Madol
- Scotland – Kingdom of Scotland
  Capital: Edinburgh
- Senarica – Senarica Republic
  Capital: Senarica
- Shan States (minor kingdoms of Burma)
- Shewa – Sultanate of Shewa
  Capital: Tegulat
- Shaybanid Uzbek State (Khanate of Bukhara)
  Capital: Samarkand
- Shilluk – Shilluk Kingdom
- Sibir – Khanate of Sibir
  Capital: Qashliq
- Sindh – Samma dynasty of Sindh
  Capital: Thatta
- Songhai – Songhai Empire
  Capital: Gao
- Suket – Suket State
  Capital: Sundar Nagar
- Sunda – Kingdom of Sunda
  Capital: Pakuan Pajajaran
- Sweden – Kingdom of Sweden
  Capital: Stockholm

=== T ===
- Tarascan state
  Capital: Tzintzuntzan (Mesoamerican site)
- Ternate – Sultanate of Ternate
  Capital: Ternate
- Teutonic Knights – State of the Teutonic Order
  Capital: Königsberg
- Thomond – Kingdom of Thomond
- Tibet, Phagmodrupa – Phagmodrupa dynasty of Tibet
  Capital: Nêdong
- Tibet, Rinpungpa – Rinpungpa dynasty of Tibet
  Capital: Shigatse
- Tidore – Sultanate of Tidore
  Capital: Tidore
- Timurid Empire
  Capital: Herat
- Tlaxcala – Confederacy of Tlaxcala
  Capital: Tlaxcala
- Tlemcen – Zayyanid Kingdom of Tlemcen
  Capital: Tlemcen
- Tondo – Tundun
  Capital: Tondo
- Tonga – Tuʻi Tonga Empire
  Capital: Muʻa (Tongatapu)
- Tunjurs – Tunjur Kingdom
  Capital: Uri
- Tunis – Sultanate of Tunis
  Capital: Tunis
- Tyrconnell
  Capital: Kilmacrennan
  Capital: Donegal Castle
- Tyrone
- Twipra – Kingdom of Twipra
  Capital: Khorongma

=== U ===
- Uí Maine
- Usfurids – Usfurid dynasty

=== V ===
- Venice – Most Serene Republic of Venice
  Capital: Venice
- Vijayanagara – Vijayanagara Empire
  Capital: Vijayanagara

=== W ===
- Warsangali – Warsangali Sultanate
  Capital: Las Khorey
- Wehali – Sultanate of Wehali
- Welayta – Kingdom of Welayta

=== Y ===
- Yemen – Tahirid dynasty of Yemen
  Capital: Zabid
- Yuan – Northern Yuan

=== Z ===
- Zapotec – Zapotec Empire
  Capital: Mitla

== Holy Roman Empire ==
The Holy Roman Empire was a highly decentralized collection of polities. A comprehensive list of all of its anachronistic components has been made at List of states in the Holy Roman Empire, and would be much too large to fit here.

- Austria – Archduchy of Austria
  Capital: Vienna
- Bavaria – Duchy of Bavaria
  Capital: Regensburg
- Bohemia – Kingdom of Bohemia
  Capital: Prague
- Brandenburg – Margraviate of Brandenburg
  Capital: Berlin
- Electoral Palatinate – County Palatine of the Rhine
  Capital: Heidelberg
- Florence – Republic of Florence
  Capital: Florence
- Lorraine – Duchy of Lorraine
  Capital: Nancy
- Savoy – Duchy of Savoy
  Capital: Chambéry
- Saxony – Electorate of Saxony
  Capital: Wittenberg
- Switzerland – Swiss Confederacy

== Crowns and Unions ==
Crowns were composite monarchies composed of multiple countries under one ruler.

- Kalmar Union
- Kingdom of Denmark
- Norway
- Kingdom of Sweden
- Polish–Lithuanian union (federal union)
- Kingdom of Poland
- Grand Duchy of Lithuania
- Spain (dynastic union)
  - Aragon – Crown of Aragon
    - Kingdom of Aragon
    - Principality of Catalonia
    - Kingdom of Valencia
    - Kingdom of Majorca
    - Kingdom of Sardinia
    - Kingdom of Sicily
    - Kingdom of Naples
  - Castile – Crown of Castile
- Kingdom of Castile
- Kingdom of Leon

== Non-sovereign territories ==
=== England ===
- Wales (client state) – Principality of Wales
  Capital: Cardiff

=== Gujarat ===
- Khandesh – Faruqi dynasty of the Khandesh Sultanate (vassal)
  Capital: Burhanpur

=== Imereti ===
- Guria (client state) – Principality of Guria
  Capital: Ozurgeti
- Svaneti (subject) – Principality of Svaneti

=== Ottoman Empire ===
- Crimean Khanate – Crimean Khanate (vassal)
  Capital: Bakhchysarai
- Wallachia – Principality of Wallachia (vassal)
  Capital: Târgoviște

=== Poland ===
- Moldavia – Principality of Moldavia (fief)
  Capital: Suceava

=== Portugal ===
- Azores (possession)
- Brazil (colony)
- Ceuta (possession; Moroccan city captured in 1415)
- Portuguese Gold Coast (colony)
  Capital: São Jorge da Mina
- Portuguese Mozambique (colony)
  Capital: Lourenço Marques
- Príncipe (colony)
- São Tomé (colony)
- Tangier (possession)

=== Spain (Crown of Castile and Crown of Aragon) ===
- Canary Islands – Kingdom of the Canary Islands
  Capital: Teguise (municipality)
- Mellila – Mellila (Moroccan city seized in 1497)

=== Sunda ===
- Cirebon – Sultanate of Cirebon (vassal)
  Capital: Cirebon

=== Vijayanagara ===
- Calicut – Kingdom of Kozhikode (vassal)
  Capital: Kozhikode
- Mysore – Kingdom of Mysore (vassal)
  Capital: Mysore
