= List of countries by population in 1800 =

Historical demographics
Altar of Domitius Ahenobarbus
Articles
Demographic history
Historical demography Classical · Medieval
World population estimates
List of countries by population
1700	1800	1900

This is a list of countries by population in 1800. Estimate numbers are from the beginning of the year, and exact population figures are for countries that were having a census in the year 1800 (which were on various dates in that year). The bulk of these numbers are sourced from Alexander V. Avakov's Two Thousand Years of Economic Statistics, Volume 1, pages 21 to 24, which cover population figures from the year 1820 divided into modern borders. Avakov, in turn, cites a variety of sources, mostly Angus Maddison. Italian sub figures are derived from elsewhere. Other figures come from Jan Lahmeyer's website, which in turn is based on a variety of sources.

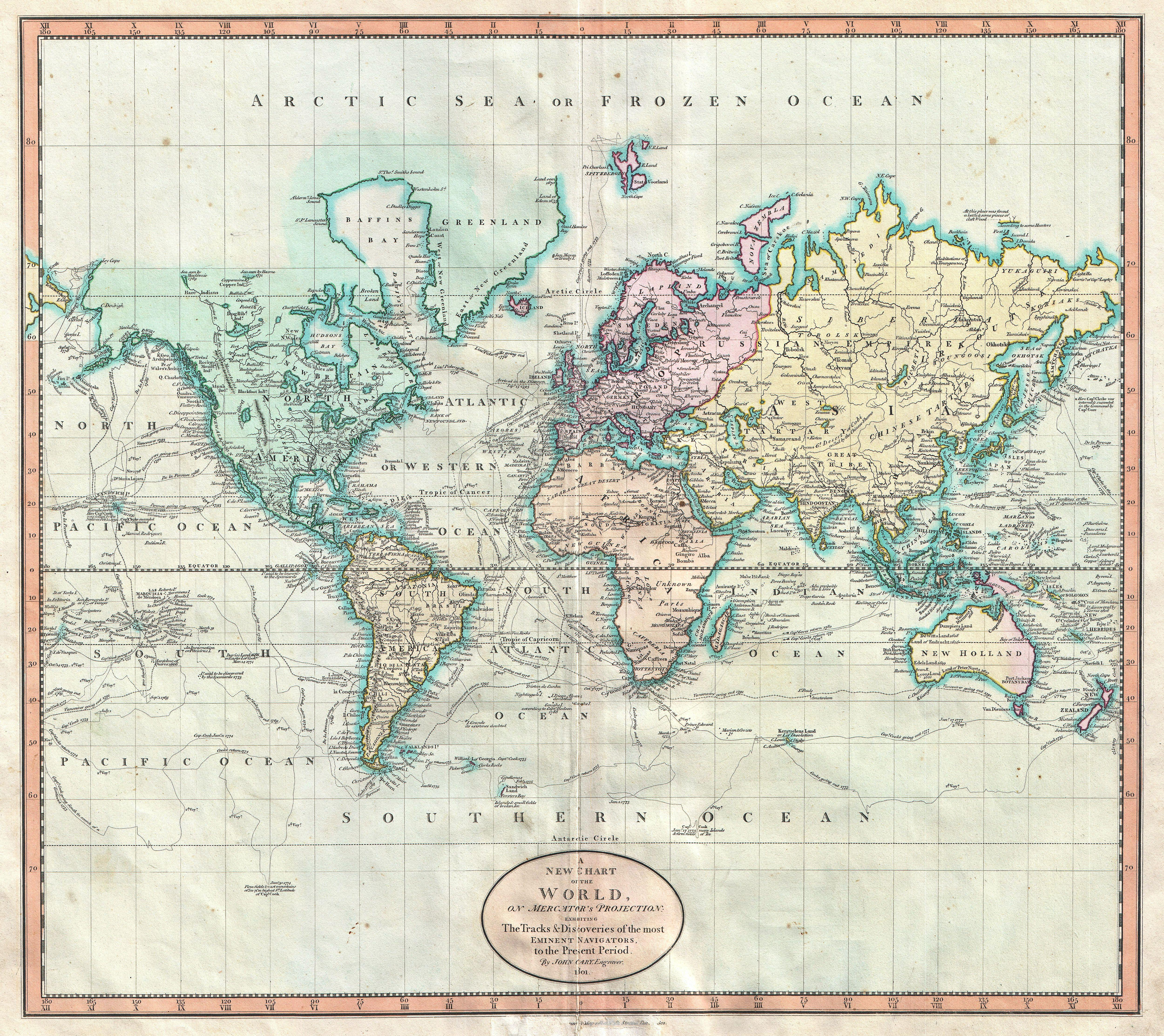

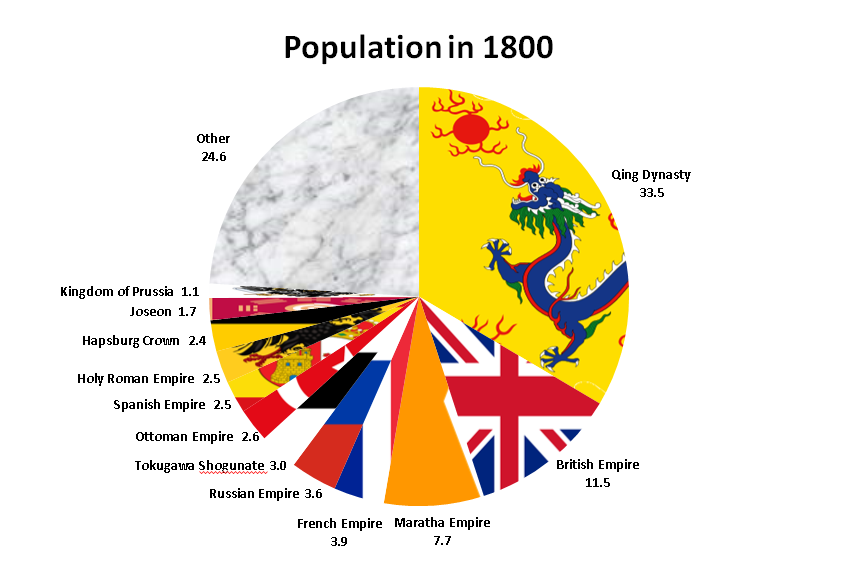

== List ==
Rank	Country/Territory	Population c. 1800	Percentage of World Population
–	World	985,000,000	–
1	Qing China subdivisions: China Proper – ~330,000,000; Taiwan – 2,000,000; Mongolia – 619,000; Xinjiang – 475,000; Hong Kong – 20,000	~330,000,000	33.5%
2	Maratha Confederacy (Note: In 1800 the Maratha Confederacy controlled roughly 2,500,000 km^{2} of land, or 56% of the Indian subcontinent, which had a population of 207 million at the time according to Mahalanobis and Bhattacharya.)	~116,000,000	11.8%
3	Britain and possessions (Note: Several territories were under the rule of the British East India Company rather than being directly controlled by the British government. London would not directly manage the Indian princely states until 1858) subdivisions: Kingdom of Great Britain – 10,481,401; British East India Company – 30,765,640 constituents; Bengal Presidency – 28,796,640; Northern Circars – ?; Kingdom of Mysore – 1,969,000; Hyderabad State – ?; Kingdom of Ireland – 5,200,000; Cape Colony (occupied by British forces) – 1,550,000; British Caribbean – 436,643 constituents; Jamaica – 250,000; Barbados – 81,000; Guyana – 50,000; Grenada – 20,000; Trinidad & Tobago – 17,643; The Bahamas – 8,000; Canada (Upper & Lower) – 300,000; Surinam (occupied by British forces) – 54,000; Belize – 15,000; Gibraltar – 5,339; Australia – 5,200 (Note: This estimation of population excludes Aboriginal Australians who were not included in estimations of populations until 1967.); Bermuda – 4,000; Hannover – ~16,470	~49,907,000	~5.0%
4	Holy Roman Empire subdivisions: Bohemian Crown – 5,516,000; Archduchy of Austria and related territories – 3,370,000; Electorate of Bavaria – 3,200,000; Margraviate of Brandenburg – 1,500,000; Duchy of Württemberg – 1,350,000; Duchy of Milan – 1,100,000; Electorate of Saxony – 1,050,000; Grand Duchy of Tuscany – 1,000,000; Margraviate of Baden – 912,000; Duchy of Styria – 912,000; Hanover – 777,000; Thuringian states – 612,000; County of Tyrol – 610,000; Landgraviate of Hesse-Darmstadt – 520,000; Duchy of Parma – 500,000; Duchy of Carniola – 400,000; Duchy of Modena and Reggio – 350,000; Duchy of Holstein – 350,000; Prince-Bishopric of Münster – 350,000; Electorate of Mainz – 336,000; Duchy of Mecklenburg-Schwerin – 318,000; Duchy of Mecklenburg-Schwerin – 300,000; Nassau – 270,000; Duchy of Magdeburg – 269,000; Austrian Silesia – 250,000; Bishopric of Würzburg – 250,000; Electorate of Trier – 240,000; Electorate of Cologne – 238,000; Electoral Palatinate – 228,000; Archbishopric of Salzburg- 220,000; Principality of Ansbach – 215,000; Duchy of Oldenburg – 159,000; Hamburg – 150,000; Principality of Reuss Elder Line – 76,308; Principality of Lippe – 70,540; Duchy of Mecklenburg-Strelitz – 70,000; Anhalt-Dessau – 52,000; Arenberg – 48,000; Free City of Lübeck – 45,000; Imperial Free City of Trieste – 40,000; Anhalt-Bernburg – 35,000; Anhalt-Köthen – 33,000; Principality of Schaumburg-Lippe – 20,132; Liechtenstein – 5,400; Duchy of Brunswick-Luneburg – ?; Saxe-Lauenburg – ?; Hesse-Homburg – ?; Bishopric of Lübeck – ?	~41,050,000	~4.2%
5	(French First Republic) France and possessions subdivisions: (France) French Republic – 26,758,000; (France) Belgium – 4,000,000; Subalpine Republic – 2,661,000; Ligurian Republic – 2,011,000; Helvetic Republic – 1,600,000; Cisalpine Republic – 1,300,000; (France) Saint-Domingue – 657,000; (France) French India – 175,000; Luxembourg – 140,000; (France) Mauritius – 70,000; (France) Malta – 60,000; Louisiana – 44,116; French Guiana – 14,500; Principality of Andorra – 5,000; Saint Pierre and Miquelon – ?	~39,600,000	~4.0%
6	Russian Empire subdivisions: Russia – 21,248,000; Ukraine (Note: Left-bank Ukraine and Right-bank Ukraine included.) – 7,800,000; Belarus – ?; Russian Poland – 3,200,000; Governorate of Livonia and Courland Governorate – 725,000; Governorate of Estonia – 650,000; Grand Duchy of Lithuania – 600,000; Septinsular Republic – 120,000; Kingdom of Kartli-Kakheti – 320,000	35,005,000	3.4%
7	Tokugawa Japan	29,000,000	2.9%
8	Spain and possessions subdivisions: Kingdom of Spain – 10,541,000; New Spain – 5,945,000; New Granada – 2,300,000; Río de la Plata – 2,082,000; Philippines – 1,800,000; Peru – 1,400,000; Chile – 800,000; Guatemala – 425,000; Cuba – 300,000; Puerto Rico – 136,000; Louisiana – 44,116; Yucatán – ?; Provincias Internas – ?	26,500,000	2.7%
9	Ottoman Empire subdivisions: (Ottoman Empire) Anatolia – 8,400,000; Egypt Eyalet – ~4,000,000 - 4,394,000; Beylik of Tunis – ?; (Ottoman Empire) Ottoman Algeria – 3,000,000; (Ottoman Empire) Bulgaria – 2,700,000; Ottoman Tripolitania – ?; (Ottoman Empire) Iraq- ?; (Ottoman Empire) Greece – 500,000; (Ottoman Empire) Habesh Eyalet – ?; (Ottoman Empire) Serbia – ?; Syria – ?; Sidon Eyalet – ?; (Ottoman Empire) Albania – ?; Palestine – 250,000; Cyprus – ?; (Ottoman Empire) Bosnia – ?; (Ottoman Empire) Crete – ?; Childir Eyalet – ?; vassal states: Principality of Wallachia – 1,000,000; Principality of Moldavia - 900,000; Kingdom of Imereti – 200,000; Principality of Mingrelia – 110,000; Principality of Abkhazia – 65,000; Principality of Guria – 30,000; Septinsular Republic – ?	26,000,000	2.6%
10	Habsburg monarchy subdivisions: Archduchy of Austria – 1,820,000; Kingdom of Hungary – 6,300,000; Kingdom of Galicia and Lodomeria – 3,900,000; Kingdom of Bohemia – 2,810,000; Venetian Province – 1,845,000; Principality of Transylvania – 1,500,000; Margraviate of Moravia – 1,260,000; Duchy of Styria – 800,000; County of Tyrol – 610,000; Military Frontier – 565,000; Kingdom of Croatia – 400,000; Duchy of Carniola – 400,000; Duchy of Carinthia – 300,000; Dalmatia – 300,000; Austrian Silesia – 250,000; Duchy of Bukovina – 130,000; Imperial Free City of Trieste – 40,000; Kingdom of Slavonia – 285,000; County of Gorizia and Gradisca – 120,000	23,145,000	2.3%
11	Joseon	~18,500,000	~1.9%
12	Sikh Empire	12,000,000	1.2%
13	Kingdom of Prussia subdivisions: Margraviate of Brandenburg – 1,500,000	8,700,000	0.9%
14	Carnatic Sultanate	10,000,000	1%
15	Durrani Empire	9,780,000	0.9%
16	Portuguese Empire subdivisions: Kingdom of Portugal – 2,970,000; Viceroyalty of Brazil – 3,600,000; Mozambique – 1,250,000; Angola – 1,010,000; Timor – 300,000; Portuguese India – 210,000 constituents; Goa – ?; Dadra and Nagar Haveli – ?; Cape Verde – ?; Guinea – ?; Portuguese Macau – ?	~9,400,000	~0.9%
17	Tây Sơn dynasty (Đại Việt)	7,291,000	0.7%
18	Kingdom of Naples subdivisions: Kingdom of Naples – 5,000,000; Kingdom of Sicily – 1,700,000	7,000,000	0.7%
19	Batavian Republic subdivisions: Batavian Republic – 1,850,000; Dutch East Indies – 4,200,000; Dutch Gold Coast – ?; Curaçao and Dependencies – ?; Aruba – ?; Dutch Bengal – ?; Dutch Suratte – ?; Dutch Coromandel – ?	~6,050,000	~0.6%
20	Qajar Iran	6,010,000	0.6%
21	United States of America	5,509,879	0.5%
22	Morocco	5,000,000	0.3%
23	Konbaung dynasty (Burma)	4,200,000	0.4%
24	Rattanakosin Kingdom (Siam)	4,050,000 (Note: 1800 (Lieberman)/Early 19th century (Baker-Phongpaichit).)	0.1%-0.4%
25	Talpur Sindh	4,000,000	0.4%
26	Sweden	3,347,000	0.3%
27	Kazakh Khanate	2,985,000	0.3%
28	Ethiopian Empire	2,950,000	0.3%
29	Kingdom of Sardinia	2,900,000	0.30%
30	Papal States	2,300,000	0.2%
31	Oyo Empire (Note: In 2021, the Yoruba population was estimated to make up 17.9% of the Nigerian population. In 1800, the population of Nigeria was 12.1 million, and 17.9% of that rounds to 2,175,016.)	~2,175,016	0.2%
32	Emirate of Diriyah subdivisions: Trucial Sheiks – 41,000	2,132,000	0.2%
33	Denmark–Norway subdivisions: Denmark – 929,000; Norway- 883,000; Schleswig – 240,000; Iceland- 46,000; Danish West Indies – 40,000; Greenland – 5,000; Danish India – ?	2,100,000	~0.2%
34	Cambodia	2,090,000	0.2%
35	Southern Vietnam under Nguyễn Ánh	1,770,000	0.2%
36	Grand Duchy of Tuscany	1,224,000	0.13%
37	Emirate of Bukhara	1,200,000	0.12%
38	Parma	415,000	0.042%
39	Sultanate of Oman subdivisions: Oman – 300,000; Bahrain – 63,000	363,000	0.037%
40	Aro Confederacy (Note: In 2006, the Aro population was estimated to make up 2.9% of the Nigerian population. In 1800, the population of Nigeria was 12.1 million, and 2.9% of that rounds to 349,081.)	~349,081	0.035%
41	Ankole (Note: Today, the Ankole population is estimated to make up 9.8% of the Ugandan population. In 1800, the population of Uganda was 2.1 million, and 9.8% of that is 205,800.)	205,800	0.021%
42	Ryukyu Kingdom (Japanese vassal)	155,650	0.016%
43	Hawaiian Kingdom (Note: Hawaii adopted the British Red Ensign as an independent nation from 1793 to 1800.)	145,000 (est.) (Note: 1819 estimate)	0.015%
44	Republic of Lucca	120,000	0.012%
45	Republic of Ragusa	30,000	0.012%
46	Dendi Kingdom (Note: Today, the Dendi population is estimated to make up 0.02% of the African population. In 1800, the population of Africa was 85,589,000, and 9.8% of that rounds to 17,243.)	~17,243	0.0018%
47	Kingdom of Tahiti (Note: Tahiti did not have a national flag until 1822.)	16,000 (Note: 1797 estimate)	0.0016%
48	Qatar	14,000	0.0014%
49	Liechtenstein	5,800	0.00059%
50	San Marino	5,490	0.00056%
51	Andorra	2,650	0.00027%

== Note ==
The aggregate populations will exceed the total population because some states existed in multiple entities. For example, the Kingdom of Prussia and the Habsburg monarchy had holdings that were also part of the Holy Roman Empire (though not all of the Prussian and Habsburg territories shared this aspect). In another case, the province of Wallachia was a vassal of the Ottoman sultan, but also a tributary of the Russian Empire.

== See also ==
- List of countries by population
- List of countries by population in 1700
- List of countries by population in 1900
- List of countries by population in 2000
- List of countries by population in 2005
