= Classical demography =

Study of the human population in Antiquity

Classical demography refers to the study of human demography in the Classical period. It often focuses on the absolute number of people who were alive in civilizations around the Mediterranean Sea between the Bronze Age and the fall of the Western Roman Empire, but in recent decades historians have been more interested in trying to analyse demographic processes such as the birth and death rates or the sex ratio of ancient populations. The period was characterized by an explosion in population with the rise of the Greek and Roman civilizations followed by a steep decline caused by economic and social disruption, migrations, and a return to primarily subsistence agriculture. Demographic questions play an important role in determining the size and structure of the economy of Ancient Greece and the Roman economy.

== Ancient Greece and Greek colonies ==
From around 800 BC, Greek city-states began colonizing the Mediterranean and Black Sea coasts. Suggested reasons for this dramatic expansion include overpopulation, severe droughts, or an escape for vanquished people (or a combination). The population of the areas of Greek settlement from the western Mediterranean to Asia Minor and the Black Sea in the 4th century BC has been estimated at up to 10 million.

=== Greece proper ===
The geographical definition of Greece has fluctuated over time. While today the ancient kingdom of Macedonia is always considered part of the Greek world, in the Classical period it was a distinct entity and even though the Macedonian language was part of the Greek dialect continuum it was not considered as a part of Greece by some Athenian writers. Similarly, almost all modern residents of historical Ionia, now part of Turkey, speak the Turkish language, although from the 1st millennium BC Ionia was densely populated by Greek-speaking people and an important part of Greek culture.

Estimates of the Greek-speaking population on the coast and islands of the Aegean Sea during the 5th century BC vary from 800,000 to more than 3,000,000. In Athens and Attica in the 5th century BC there were up to 150,000 Athenians of the citizen class, around 30,000 aliens and 100,000 slaves, most residing outside the city and port., though precise numbers remain unknown and estimates vary widely.

=== Other Greek colonization ===
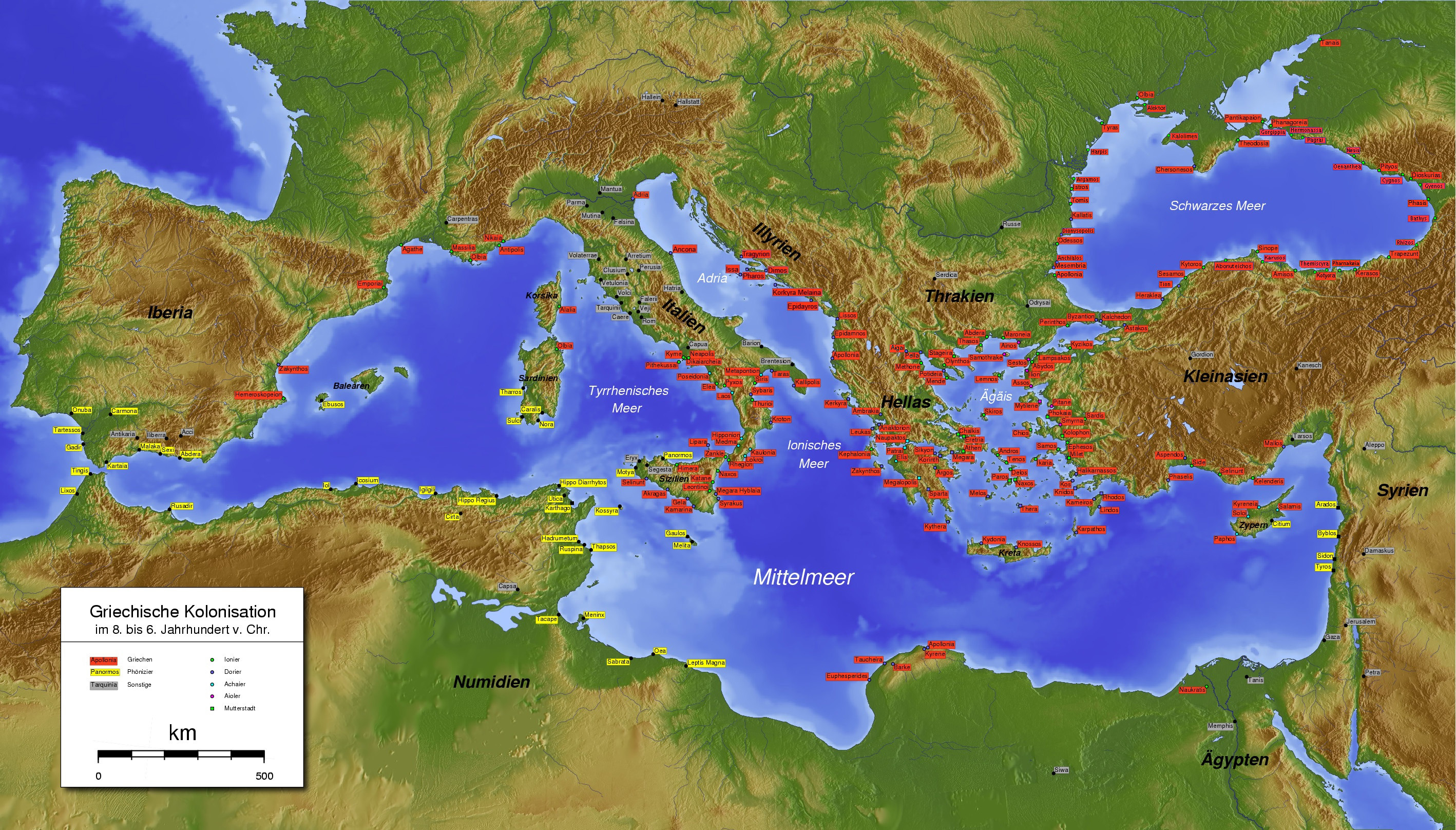
Map of Phoenician (in yellow) and Greek colonies (in red) around 8th to 6th century BC

The ancient Roman province of Cyrenaica in the eastern region of present-day Libya was home to a Greek, Latin and native population in the hundreds of thousands. Originally settled by Greek colonists, five important settlements (Cyrene, Barca, Euesperides, Apollonia, and Tauchira) formed a pentapolis. The fertility of the land, the exportation of silphium, and its location between Carthage and Alexandria made it a magnet for settlement. Massalia (Marseille) was colonized in 600 BCE by Ionian Greeks from Phokaia, Anatolia and further Greek colonies were established across the southern coast of Gual west towards the Iberian Peninsula to Emporion and Hemeroscopium.

== Ancient Phoenicia and Phoenician colonies ==
Phoenicia (as named by the Greeks) also established colonies along the Mediterranean, including Carthage founded 814 BCE. The Phoenicians were a civilization known for their seafaring expertise, trading, exploring (Hanno the Navigator, Hamlico) and colonization. Their alphabet is the at the root basis for the Greek, Latin and even the English lettering and went with their wide travels. In Canaan in what is now Lebanon they founded the famous ancient independent city-states of Gubla-later called Byblos, Tyre, Sidon, Berytus (present-day Beirut), and Arwad (Tartus, Syria) and from Canaan across the Great Sea (the Mediterranean) and beyond the Pillars of Hercules. The Phoenicians traded from Egypt and Persia to Rome, from Canaan to Gades. Tin from Britania, wine from across the region, Tyrian Purple Dye, Lapis Lazuli from the Hind Kush, glass, amphora and much more. Both the Greeks and Romans were influenced by their colonization. The Phoenicians established colonies and trading posts across North Africa and through the Pillars of Hercules (Straits of Gibraltar) into the Sea of Atlas (the Atlantic Ocean) and include Hippo Regius, Icosium, Hadrumetum, Utica, Lixus, Tingis, Oea (Tripoli) Gades (Cadiz) Leptis Magna, Sabratha, Pharos Island (Alexandria), many of the mediterranean islands Sis (Palermo) Motya and Soluntum on Sicily; Kitiya (Kition) Crete, the Balearic Islands, Karaly (Cagliari) Sardinia and if not full colonies, trading posts in Porto (at the Douro River), Lisbon (at the Tagus River), Arambys (Mogador Island-Essaouira, Morocco). Due to many factors, the Punic Wars being a primary one, there are few writings in Punic (the Roman term for Phoenician). Archaeologists are shedding more light on this important ancient Mediterranean culture and much of what we do have of their history was primarily scribed by Greek, Roman and other early scholars.

== Demography of the Hellenistic kingdoms ==
The major Hellenistic kingdoms in c. 301 BC

When urbanization began to take place, it was Pella which became the largest city. The Kingdom of Macedonia had 4 million people after the Wars of the Diadochi.

=== Ptolemaic Egypt ===
Greek historian Diodorus Siculus estimated that 7,000,000 inhabitants resided in Egypt during his lifetime before its annexation by the Roman Empire. Of this, he states that 300,000 citizens lived within the city of Alexandria. Later historians have queried whether the country could have supported such high numbers.

=== Seleucid Empire ===
The population of the vast Seleucid Empire has been estimated to have been higher than 30 million., though others indicate as few as 20 million inhabitants in the whole of Alexander's earlier empire of which it had been a part.

== Demography of the Roman Empire ==
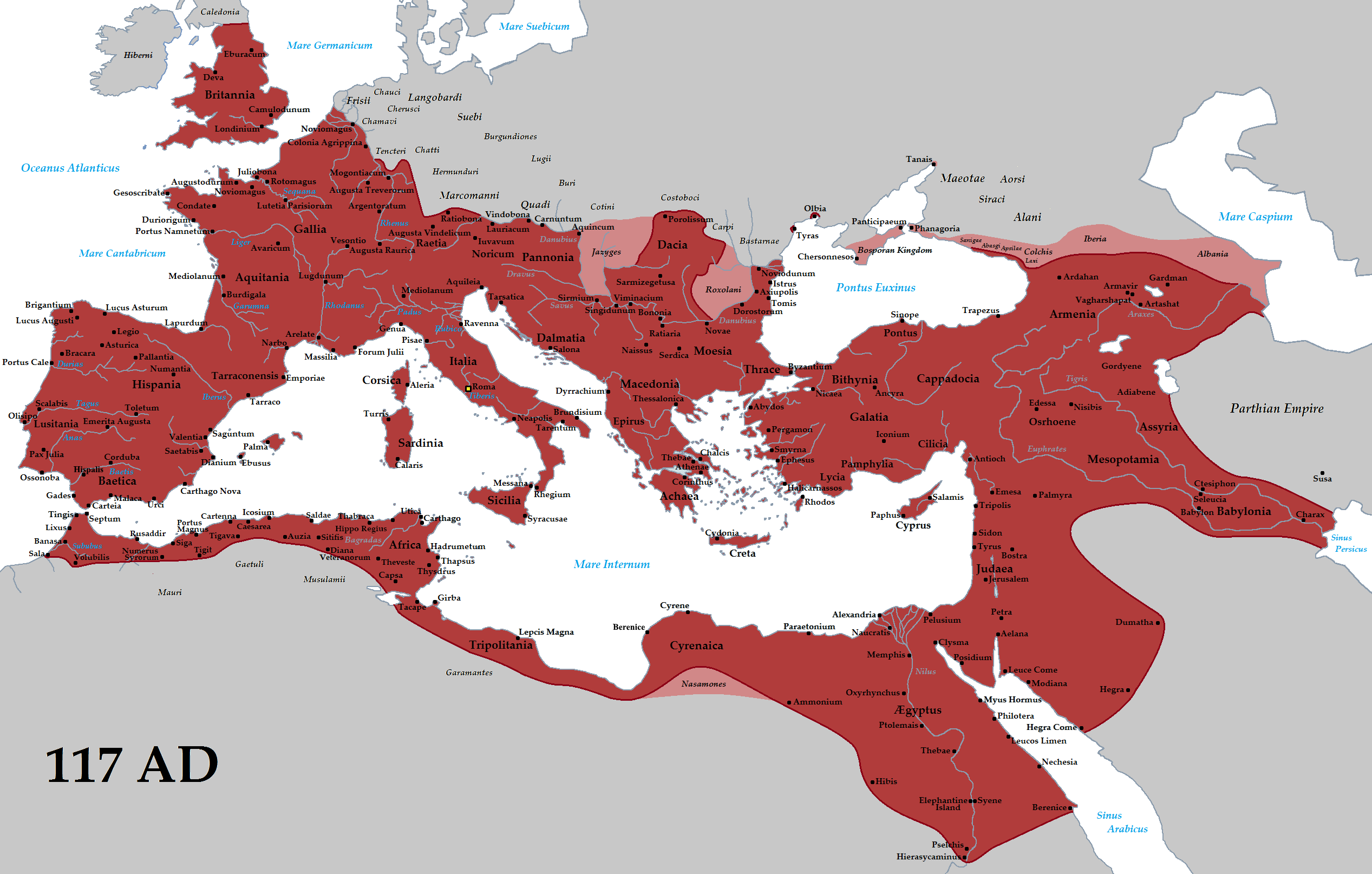
The Roman Empire at its greatest extent, in the reign of Trajan, 117 AD

There are many estimates of the population for the Roman Empire, that range from 45 million to 120 million with 59–76 million as the most accepted range. The population likely peaked just before the Antonine Plague.

An estimated population of the empire during the reign of Augustus:

Beloch's 1886 estimate for the population of the empire during the reign of Augustus:

Region	Population (in millions)
Total Empire	54
European part	23
Asian part	19.5
North African part	11.5

Russell's 1958 estimate for the population of the empire in 1 AD:

Region	Population (in millions)
Total Empire	46.9
European part	25
Asian part	13.2
North African part	8.7
European areas outside the Empire	7.9

Russell's 1958 estimate for the population of the empire in 350 AD:

Region	Population (in millions)
Total Empire	39.3
European part	18.3
Asian part	16
North African part	5
European areas outside the Empire	8.3

=== Roman Italy ===
The Romans carried out a regular census of citizens eligible for military service (Polybius 2.23), but for the population of the rest of Italy at this time we have to rely on a single report of the military strength of Rome's allies in 227 BC – and guess the numbers of those who were opposed to Rome at this time. The citizen count in the 2nd century BC hovered between 250 and 325,000 presumably males over the age of 13.

The census of 70/69 BC records 910,000 presumably due to the extension of citizenship to the allies after the Social War of 91–87 BC. Still, even if only males this seems like an undercount. For the 1st and 2nd centuries BC, historians have developed two radically different accounts, resting on different interpretations of the figures of 4,036,000 recorded for the census carried out by Augustus in 28 BC, 4,233,000 in 8 BC, and 4,937,000 in 14 AD and almost 6 million during the reign of Claudius, not all of whom lived in Italy. Does the census record only adult males, all adult citizens or all citizen. Many lived in Spain, Gaul and other parts of the Empire. If 4,063,000 only represents adult male citizens there were 13 million Romans, if all adults 6.5 million (or some subset of adult male citizens those over age 13 as the census traditionally did not count children until they were formally enrolled as citizens early in puberty), then the population of Italy must have been around 10 million, not including slaves and foreigners, which was a striking, sustained increase despite the Romans' losses in the almost constant wars over the previous two centuries. However losses were not great all the time; and there was an economic boom from 175 BC; and the Po Valley region was spared the Social War and civil wars on the Peninsula. The Po Valley may have contributed half the increase in the number of citizens, Latins and Allies from 3.2 million in 225 BC to 4.8 million and 2.3 million in the Valley. Also, the censuses undercounted by at least 10%. Others find the high side of 13 million entirely incredible, and argue that the census must now be counting all citizens, male and female over the age of 13 – in which case the population had declined slightly, something which can readily be attributed to war casualties and to the crisis of the Italian peasantry. The majority of historians favour the latter interpretation as being more demographically plausible, but the issue remains contentious. The low count of 4.063 million – 4.5 million with 10% added for the undercount – is also contested since it includes Cisalpine inhabitants except for some tribes who were not yet citizens. The number of Po valley is not known, but if the Romans, Latins and Allies numbered 3.2 million and the Cispalines 1 million in 225 BC it means only 300,000 increase in 200 years which is highly implausible.

Estimates for the population of mainland Italia, including Gallia Cisalpina, at the beginning of the 1st century AD range from 6,000,000 according to Beloch in 1886, 6,830,000 according to Russell in 1958, less than 10,000,000 according to Hin in 2007, and 14,000,000 according to Lo Cascio in 2009.

Evidence for the population of Rome itself or of the other cities of Roman Italy is equally scarce. For the capital, estimates have been based on the number of houses listed in 4th-century AD guidebooks, on the size of the built-up area, and on the volume of the water supply, all of which are problematic; the best guess is based on the number of recipients of the grain dole under Augustus, 200,000, implying a population of around 800,000–1,200,000. Italy had numerous urban centres – over 400 are listed by Pliny the Elder – but the majority were small, with populations of just a few thousand. As much as 40% of the population might have lived in towns (25% if the city of Rome is excluded), on the face of it an astonishingly high level of urbanisation for a pre-industrial society. However, studies of later periods would not count the smallest centres as 'urban'; if only cities of 10,000+ are counted, Italy's level of urbanisation was a more realistic but still impressive 25% (11% excluding Rome).

== See also ==
- Historical demography
- Medieval demography
- Colonies in antiquity
- Roman agriculture
- Deforestation during the Roman period
- List of states by population in 1 CE
- Pre-modern human migration
