= Ojstrica Castle =

Coordinates: 46°12′27.70″N 14°58′59.96″E

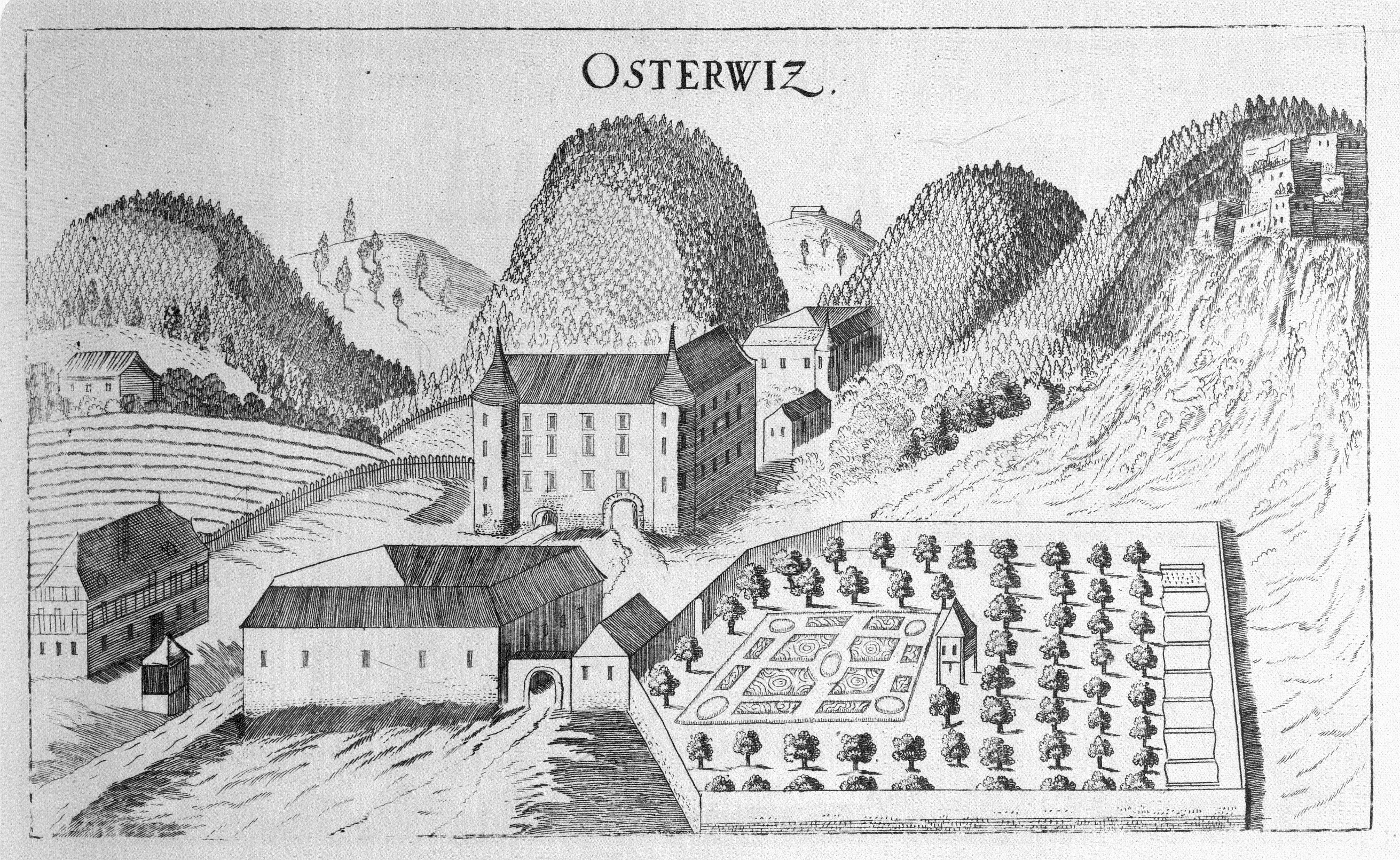
Ojstrica Castle, Georg Matthäus Vischer, Topographia Ducatus Stiriae (1681)

Ojstrica Castle (Slovene: Grad Ojstrica, German: Osterwitz, Osterwiz, Osterbitz) was a castle above the settlement of Loke in the Municipality of Tabor in central Slovenia. Today only a ruin remains of the castle on a hill locally known as Stari Grad (Old Castle) southwest of the settlement core.

It was originally built in the 13th century and belonged to the Counts of Celje. It was abandoned in the 16th century after it was attacked during a peasant revolt in 1535. By the early 17th century it was already a ruin. Today all that remains are parts of the fortifications.

Ojstrica Castle was historically believed to be the site where Veronika of Desenice was imprisoned and eventually murdered.
