= Kapla, Tabor =

Kapla
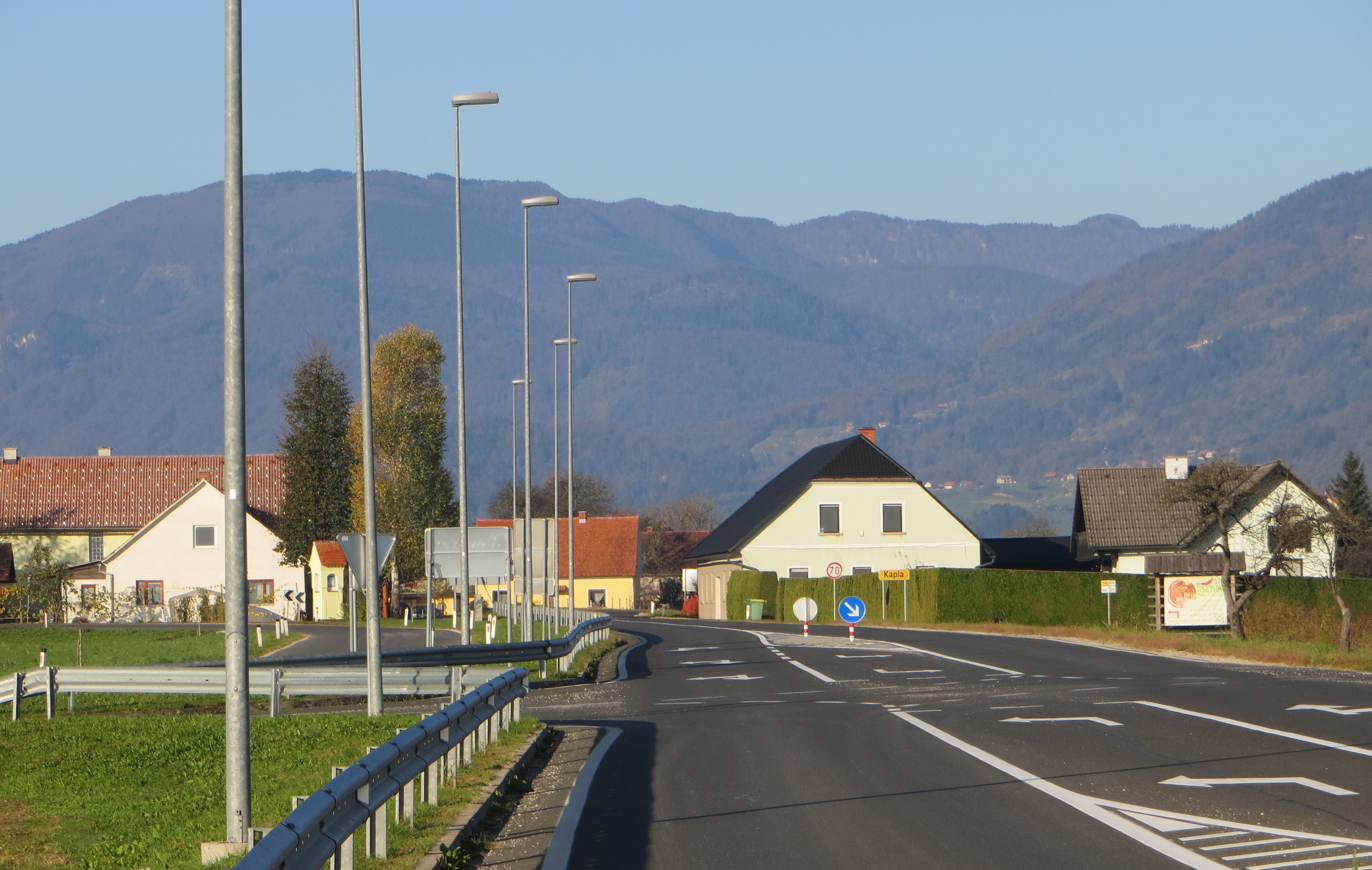

- Location in Slovenia
- Coordinates: 46°14′49.76″N 15°1′11.91″E
- Country: Slovenia
- Traditional region: Styria
- Statistical region: Savinja
- Municipality: Tabor

Area
  - Total: 3.16 km^{2} (1.22 sq mi)
- Elevation: 303 m (994 ft)

Population (2002)
  - Total: 255

Kapla (pronounced [ˈkaːpla]; in older sources also Kaplja, German: Kappel) is a village in the Municipality of Tabor in central Slovenia. The Slovenian A1 motorway runs along the northern edge of the territory belonging to the village. The area is part of the traditional region of Styria. The municipality is now included in the Savinja Statistical Region.

== Church ==
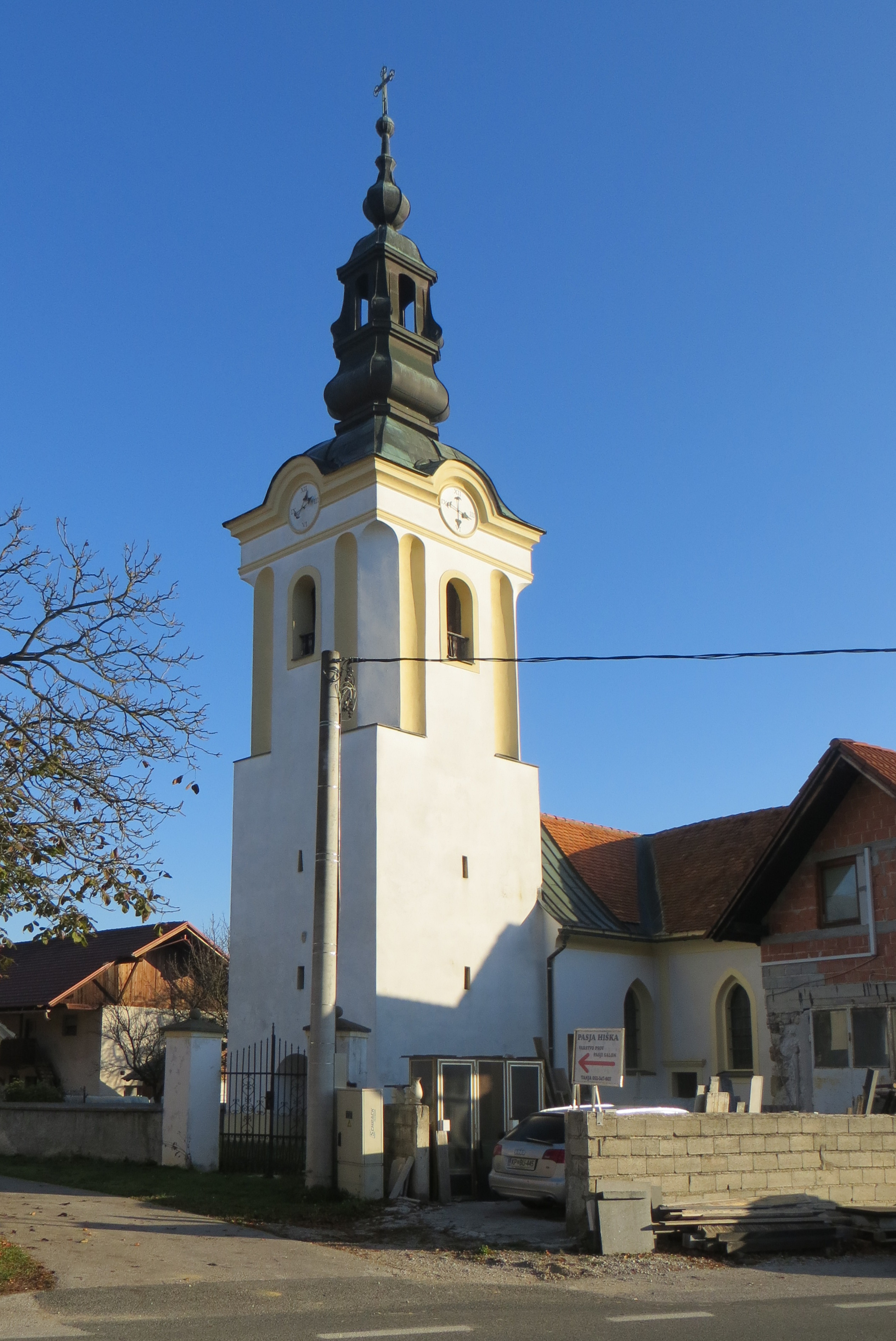
Saint Radegund's Church

The local church is dedicated to Saint Radegund and belongs to the Parish of Sveti Jurij ob Taboru. It has a Gothic core with major 19th-century rebuilding and a belfry dating to 1669.
