= Sveti Miklavž =

Sveti Miklavž may refer to several places in Slovenia:

- Miklavž na Dravskem Polju, a settlement in the Municipality of Miklavž na Dravskem Polju, known as Sveti Miklavž until 1955
- Miklavž pri Ormožu, a settlement in the Municipality of Ormož, known as Sveti Miklavž pri Ormožu until 1955
- Miklavž pri Taboru, a settlement in the Municipality of Tabor, known as Sveti Miklavž pri Taboru until 1955
