= Loke, Tabor =

Loke
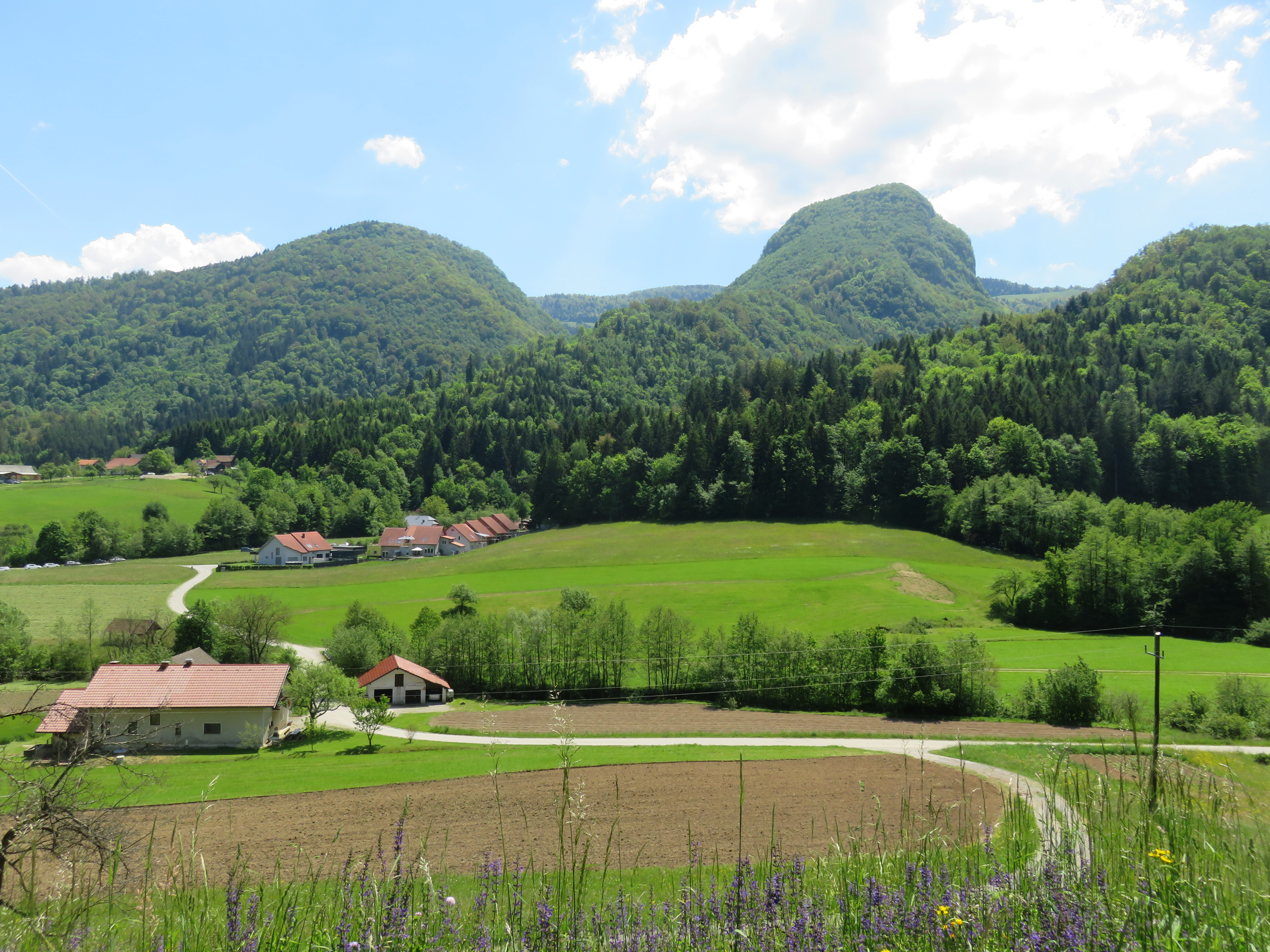

- Location in Slovenia
- Coordinates: 46°13′21.02″N 15°0′29.41″E
- Country: Slovenia
- Traditional region: Styria
- Statistical region: Savinja
- Municipality: Tabor

Area
  - Total: 6.27 km^{2} (2.42 sq mi)
- Elevation: 357.7 m (1,174 ft)

Population (2002)
  - Total: 169

Loke (pronounced [ˈloːkɛ]; German: Lakdorf) is a dispersed settlement in the Municipality of Tabor in central Slovenia. It lies in the valleys of Ojstrica Creek and Konjščica Creek and the surrounding hills. The area is part of the traditional region of Styria. The municipality is now included in the Savinja Statistical Region.

== Castle ==
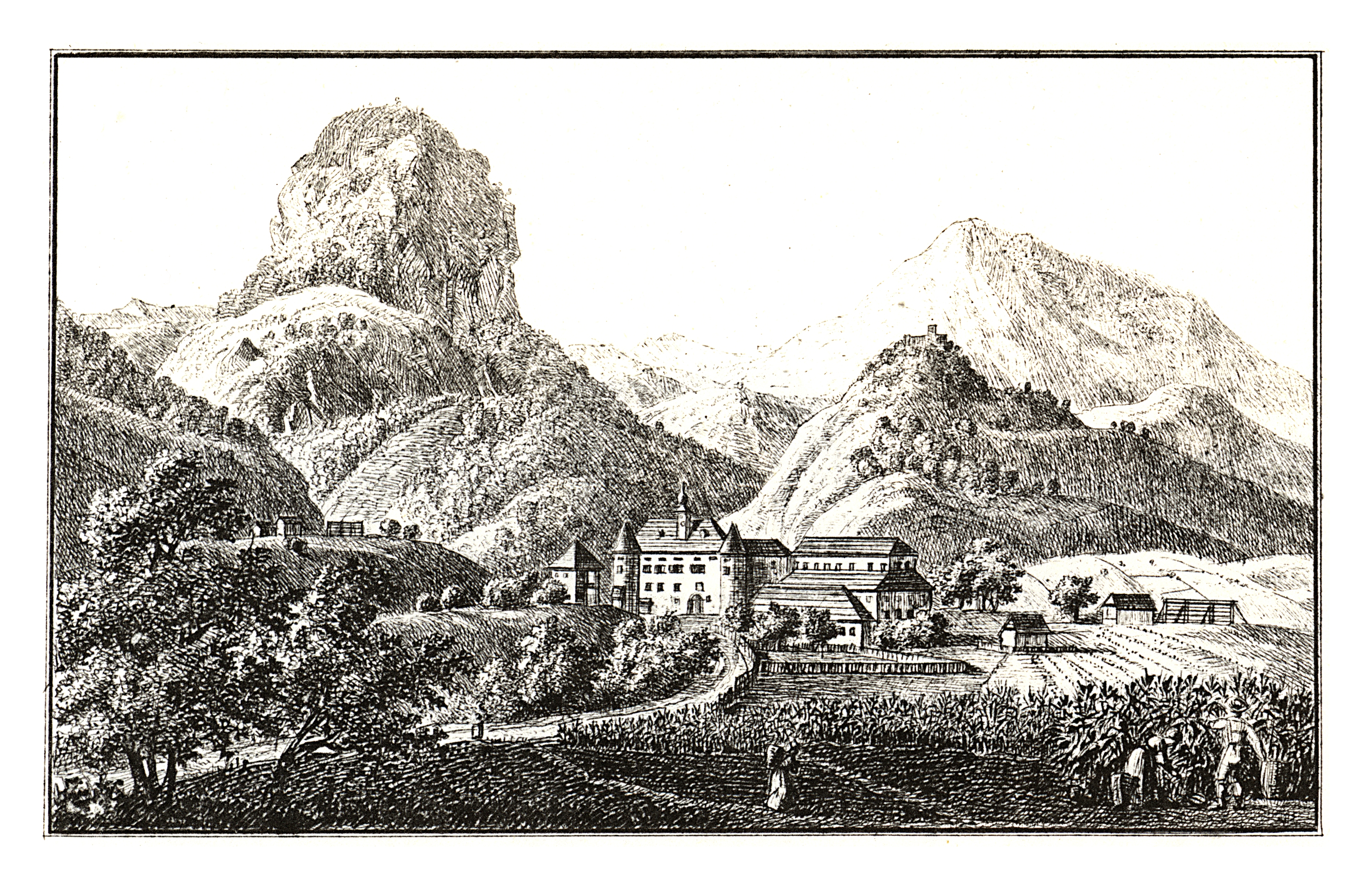
Osterwitz Castle (lithograph, 1830)

A hill near the settlement was the site of Ojstrica Castle (German: Osterwitz), a 13th-century castle originally belonging to the Counts of Celje. It was abandoned in the 16th century after it was attacked during a peasant revolt in 1535. By the early 17th century it was already a ruin. Today all that remains are parts of the fortifications.
