= Medieval demography =

Human demography in Europe and the Mediterranean during the Middle Ages

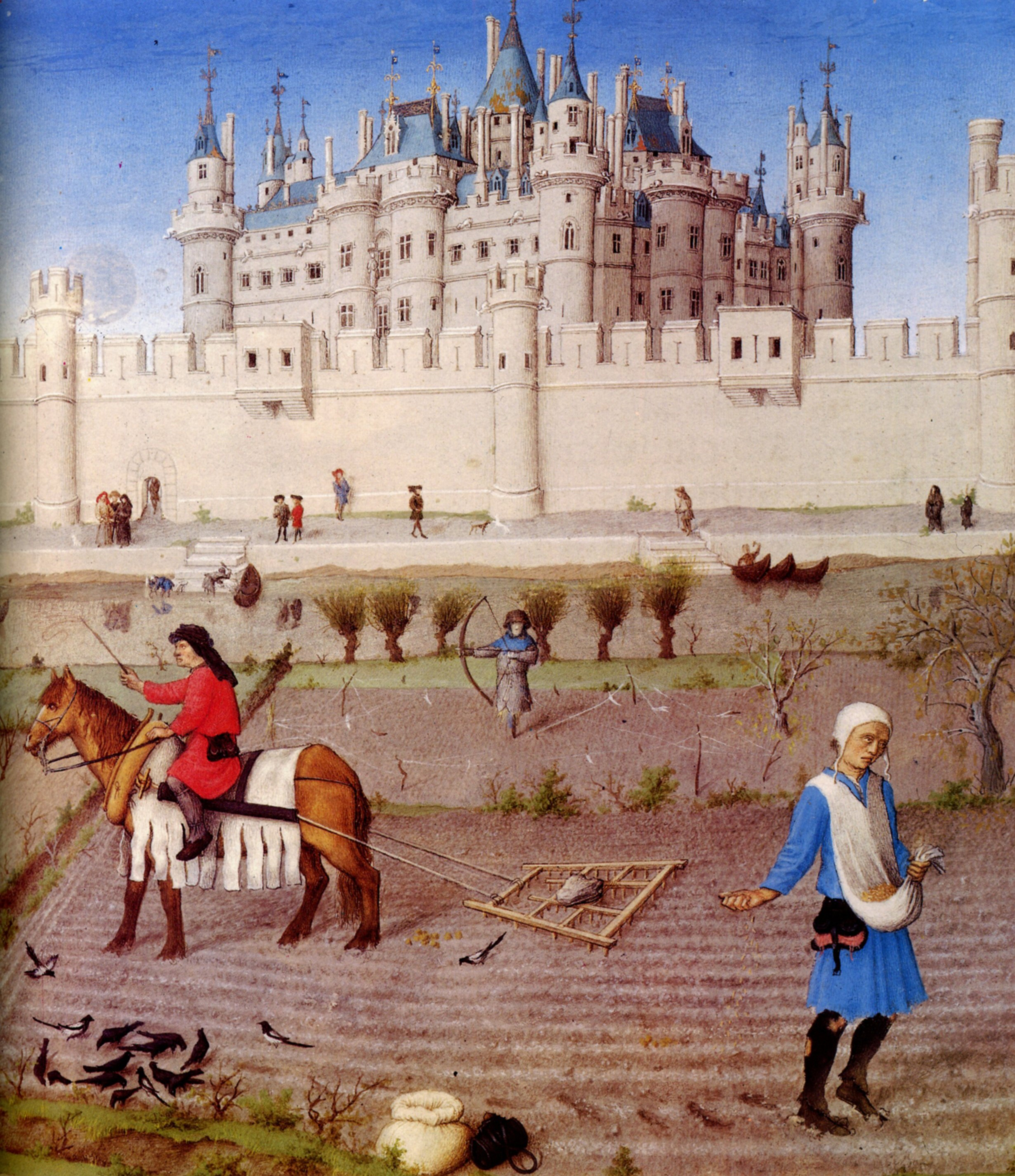
Peasants preparing the fields next to the medieval Louvre Castle for the winter with a harrow and sowing for the winter grain, from The Very Rich Hours of the Duke of Berry, c. 1410

Medieval demography is the study of human demography in Europe and the Mediterranean during the Middle Ages. It estimates and seeks to explain the number of people who were alive during the Medieval period, population trends, life expectancy, family structure, and related issues. Demography is considered a crucial element of historical change throughout the Middle Ages.

The population of Europe remained at a low level in the Early Middle Ages, boomed during the High Middle Ages and reached a peak around 1300, then a number of calamities caused a steep decline, the nature of which historians have debated. Population levels began to recover around the late 15th century, gaining momentum in the early 16th century.

The science of medieval demography relies on various lines of evidence, such as administrative records, wills and other types of records, archaeological field data, economic data, and written histories. Because the data are often incomplete and/or ambiguous, there can be significant disagreement among medieval demographers.

== Demographic history of Europe ==
The population levels of Europe during the Middle Ages can be roughly categorized:

- 400–600 (Late Antiquity): population decline
- 600–1000 (Early Middle Ages): stable at a low level, with intermittent growth.
- 1000–1250 (High Middle Ages): population boom and expansion.
- 1250–1348 (Late Middle Ages): stable or intermittently rising at a high level, with fall in 1315–17 in most of Europe.
- 1348–1420 (Late Middle Ages): steep decline in England and France, growth in East Central Europe.
- 1420–1470 (Late Middle Ages): stable or intermittently falling to a low level in Western Europe, growth in East Central Europe.
- 1470–onward: slow expansion gaining momentum in the early 16th century.

=== Late Antiquity ===
Late Antiquity saw various indicators of Roman civilization beginning to decline, including urbanization, seaborne commerce, and total population. Only 40% as many Mediterranean shipwrecks have been found for the 3rd century as for the 1st. During the period from 150 to 400, with the intermittent appearance of plague, the population of the Roman Empire ranged from a high of 70 to a low of 50 million, followed by a fairly good recovery if not to the previous highs of the Early Empire. Serious gradual depopulation began in the West only in the 5th century, and in the East due to the appearance of bubonic plague in 541. This followed 250 years of economic growth, which began after the troubles which afflicted the empire from the 250s to 270s. Proximate causes of the population decrease include the Antonine Plague (165–180), the Plague of Cyprian (250 to c. 260), and the Crisis of the Third Century. European population probably reached a minimum during the extreme weather events of 535–536 and the ensuing Plague of Justinian (541–542). Some have connected this demographic transition to the Migration Period Pessimum, when a decrease in global temperatures impaired agricultural yields.

=== Early Middle Ages ===
A major plague epidemic struck the Mediterranean, and much of Europe, in the 6th century.

The Early Middle Ages saw relatively little population growth with urbanization well below its Roman peak, reflecting a low technological level, limited trade and political, social and economic dislocation exacerbated by the impact of Viking expansion in the north, Arab expansion in the south and the movement of Slavs and Bulgarians, and later the Magyars in the east. This rural, uncertain life spurred the development of feudalism and the Christianization of Europe. Estimates of the total population of Europe are speculative, but at the time of Charlemagne it is thought to have been between 25 and 30 million, of which perhaps half were in the Carolingian Empire that covered modern France, the Low Countries, western Germany, Austria, Slovenia, northern Italy and part of northern Spain. Most medieval settlements remained small, with agricultural land and large zones of unpopulated and lawless wilderness in between (Geographers estimate that around 800, as much as three-quarters of Europe was still forested). Population density was only two to five persons per square kilometer in Britain, similarly in Germany, and somewhat higher in France.

Manorial surveys and some allusions to provincial hearth taxes suggest a population of 5 million for Carolingian France. Presumed densities of settlement support estimates of 4 million for Italy and a similar number for Iberia, as well as German lands (including Scandinavia); 6 million for Slavic lands and perhaps 2 million for Greece and southern Balkans; 1.5 million people for the entire British Isles.

=== High Middle Ages ===
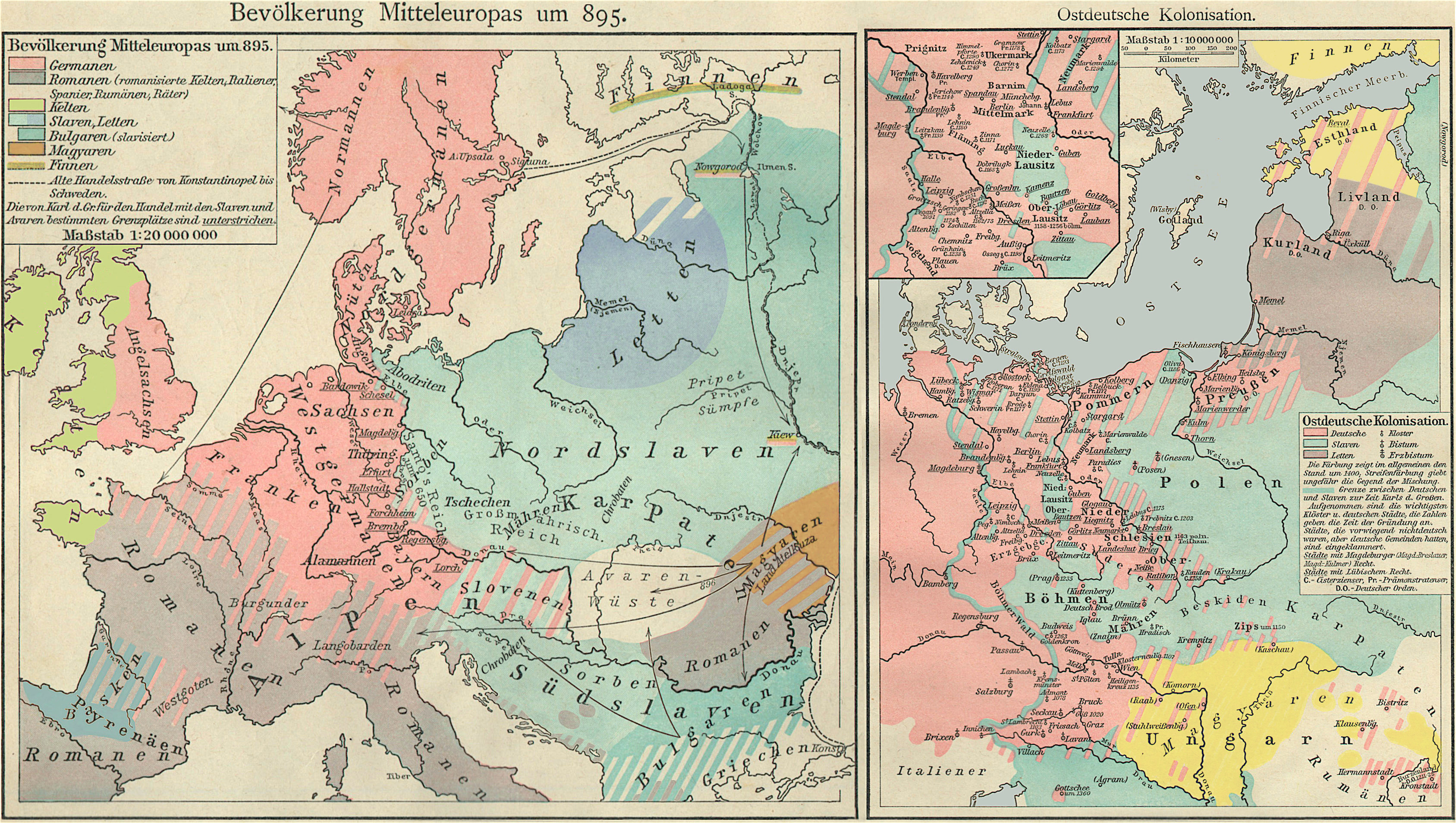
German eastward expansion, 895—1400

In the 10th–13th centuries, agriculture expanded into the wilderness, in what has been termed the "great clearances". During the High Middle Ages, many forests and marshes were cleared and cultivated. At the same time, during the Ostsiedlung, Germans resettled east of the Elbe and Saale rivers, in regions previously only sparsely populated by Polabian Slavs. Crusaders expanded to the Crusader states, parts of the Iberian Peninsula were reconquered from the Moors, and the Normans colonized England and southern Italy. These movements and conquests are part of a larger pattern of population expansion and resettlement that occurred in Europe at this time.

Reasons for this expansion and colonization include an improving climate known as the Medieval warm period, which resulted in longer and more productive growing seasons; the end of the raids by Vikings, Arabs, and Magyars, resulting in greater political stability; advancements in medieval technology allowing more land to be farmed; 11th-century reforms of the Church that further increased social stability; and the rise of Feudalism, which also brought a measure of social stability. Towns and trade revived, and the rise of a money economy began to weaken the bonds of serfdom that tied peasants to the land. Land was at first plentiful while labour to clear and work the land was scarce; lords who owned the land found new ways to attract and keep labour. Urban centres were able to attract serfs with the promise of freedom. As new regions were settled, both internally and externally, population naturally increased.

Overall, European population tripled between the years 1000 to 1348 and is estimated to have reached a peak of 73.5 million to as high as 100 million, which is substantially higher than the population of the Roman Empire at its peak.

- England – The population of England, between 1.25 and 2 million in 1086, is estimated to have grown to somewhere between 3.7 million and 5–7 million, although the 14th-century estimates derive from sources after the first plague epidemics, and the estimates for pre-plague population depends on assumed plague mortality, the proportion of children and the rate of omissions in returns of taxable population.
- Germany/Scandinavia – The population in Germany and Scandinavia rose from 4 million in 1000, to 11.5 million by 1340.
- Italy – Italy's population around 1300 has been variously estimated at between 10 and 13 million. The two largest cities in Italy, Venice and Florence, had about 100,000 persons each. The larger cities constituted as high as twenty percent of Italy's population. By 1300, the population of the entire province of Tuscany may have then surpassed 2 million people — a level the region would not reach again until after 1850.
- Denmark – Danish population reached a peak of 1 million by 13th century, estimated from a survey partially preserved in Waldemar's Land Book (1231).
- France – In 1328, France is believed to have supported between 15 and 17 million people (in a smaller geographical area than today's) and 20 million people (in the present-day area), the latter not reached again until the early modern period.
- Kingdom of Hungary – The population of the Carpathian Basin probably did not exceed 1 million at the beginning of the 12th century and it may have been between one and two million before the Mongol (Tatar) invasion of 1240. The extent of destruction is reflected in low population growth in the subsequent period. Even in the early 14th century the population was only slightly higher, between 1.4 and 2.3 million. In the fourteenth century, under Angevin dynasty (1308-1386), the population of the Kingdom reached around 3 million, before the Plague. Transylvania, in the eastern part of the Kingdom, had around 550.000 people by 1300.
- Wallachia – The region in the Southern part of modern Romania had a population of around 400,000 in the fifteenth century.
- Bulgaria – The population of the territories forming modern Bulgaria grew from around 1.1 million in the year 700 to 2.6 million in 1365.
- Constantinople – In 1203 the population of Constantinople stood 400,000 to 500,000; when the Byzantines reclaimed the city in 1261 there were only about 35,000 inhabitants left. The population of the city stood between 40,000 and 50,000 by the 1450s. The number of people captured by the Ottomans after the fall of the city was around 33,000.
- Kievan Rus – the population of Kievan Rus is estimated to be between 4.5 million and 8 million, in the absence of historical sources these estimates are based on the assumed population density.

=== Late Middle Ages ===
Citizens of Tournai bury plague victims.

By the 14th century, the frontiers of settled cultivation had ceased to expand and internal colonization was coming to an end, but population levels remained high. Then a series of events—sometimes called the Crisis of the Late Middle Ages—collectively killed millions. Starting with the Great Famine in 1315 and the Black Death from 1348, the population of Europe fell abruptly. The period between 1348 and 1420 saw the heaviest loss. In parts of Germany, about 40% of the named inhabitants disappeared. The population of Provence was reportedly halved and in some parts of Tuscany, 70% were lost during this period.

Historians have struggled to explain why so many died. Some have questioned the long-standing theory that the decline in population was caused only by infectious disease (see further discussions at Black Death) and so historians have examined other social factors, as follows.

A classic Malthusian argument has been put forward that Europe was overpopulated: even in good times it was barely able to feed its population. Grain yields in the 14th century were between 2:1 and 7:1 (2:1 means for every seed planted, 2 are harvested. Modern grain yields are 30:1 or more.) Malnutrition developed gradually over decades, lowering resistance to disease, and competition for resources meant more warfare, and then finally crop yields were pushed down by the Little Ice Age.

An alternative theory is that competition for resources exacerbated the imbalance between property-owners and workers, and that the money supply ceased to keep up with fixed increased economic activity (being commodity money based principally on silver) so that wages sank while rents rose, leading to demographic stagnation. The economic conditions of the poor also aggravated the calamities of the plague because they had no recourse, such as fleeing to a villa in the country in the manner of the nobles in the Decameron. The poor lived in crowded conditions and could not isolate the sick, and had weaker immunities from a deficient diet, difficult living and working conditions and poor sanitation. After the plague and other exogenous causes of population decline lowered the labor supply, wages increased. This increased the mobility of labour and led to a redistribution of wealth, although property-owners' attempts to resist change through wage freezes and price controls contributed to popular uprisings such as the Peasants' Revolt of 1381. By 1450, the total population of Europe was substantially below that of 150 years earlier, but all classes overall had a higher standard of living.

=== The Brenner Debate ===
Another theory, as introduced by Robert Paul Brenner in a 1976 paper, is that the economic system of the High Middle Ages limited population growth. Feudal lords and landlords controlled most of Europe's land; they could charge high enough rents or demand a large enough percentage of peasants' profit that peasants on these lands were forced to survive at subsistence levels. With any surplus of food, labor, and income absorbed by the landowners, the peasants did not have enough capital to invest in their farms or enough incentive to increase the productivity of their land.

In addition, the small size of most peasants' farms inhibited centralized and more efficient cultivation of land on larger fields. In regions of Europe where primogeniture was less widely practiced, peasant lands were subdivided and re-subdivided with each generation of heirs; Brenner writes that consequently: "This too naturally reduced the general level of peasant income, the surplus available for potential investment in agriculture, and the slim hope of agricultural innovation."

As a result, according to Brenner, on account of the social and economic system, the size of Europe's population was limited; the existing agricultural system and medieval technology could not support a population beyond a certain size. When the population of Europe surpassed the threshold that the existing economic structure permitted: population loss, social instability, and famine could result. Only through modifying the existing social structure of land ownership and distribution could Europe's population surpass early 14th century levels.

Regardless of the cause, populations continued to fall into the 15th century and remained low into the 16th because the plague returned in cycles over the course of the fourteenth and fifteenth centuries, although subsequent plagues, such as the "children's plagues" of the 1360s were less virulent than the Great Plague of 1347–1348.

== Science and art of medieval demography ==
Sources traditionally used by modern demographers, such as marriage, birth and death records, are often not available for this period, so scholars rely on other sources, such as archaeological surveys, and written records when available.

Examples of field data include the physical size of a settlement, and how it grows over time, and the appearance, or disappearance, of settlements. For example, after the Black Death the archaeological record shows the abandonment of upwards of 25% of all villages in Spain. However, archaeological data are often difficult to interpret. It is often difficult to assign a precise age to discoveries. Also, some of the largest and most important sites are still occupied and cannot be investigated. Available archaeological records may be concentrated on the more peripheral regions, for example early Middle Ages Anglo–Saxon burials at Sutton Hoo, in East Anglia in England, for which otherwise no records exist.

Because of these limitations, much of our knowledge comes from written records: descriptive and administrative accounts. Descriptive accounts include those of chroniclers who wrote about the size of armies, victims of war or famine, participants in an oath. However these cannot be relied on as accurate, and are most useful as supporting evidence rather than being taken factually on their own.

The most important written accounts are those contained in administrative records. These accounts are more objective and accurate because the motivation for writing them was not to influence others. These records can be divided into two categories: surveys and serial documents. Surveys cover an estate or region on a particular date, rather like a modern inventory. Manorial surveys were very common throughout the Middle Ages, in particular in France and England, but faded as serfdom gave way to a money economy. Fiscal surveys came with the rise of the money economy, the most famous and earliest being the Domesday Book in 1086. The Book of Hearths from Italy in 1244 is another example. The largest fiscal survey was of France in 1328. As kings continued to look for new ways to raise money, these fiscal surveys increased in number and scope over time. Surveys have limitations, because they are only a snapshot in time; they do not show long-term trends, and they tend to exclude elements of society.

Serial records come in different forms. The earliest are from the 8th century and are land conveyances, such as sales, exchanges, donations, and leases. Other types of serial records include death records from religious institutions and baptismal registrations. Other helpful records include heriots, court records, food prices and rent prices, from which inferences can be made.

== Demographic tables of Europe's population ==
The tables below are estimated by Urlanis 1941, pp. 91, 414.

European population dynamics, years 1000–1500
Year	Total European population, millions	Absolute growth per period, millions	Average growth per year, thousands	Absolute growth per century, %	Average growth per year, %
1000	56.4	—	—	—	—
1100	62.1	5.7	57	10.1	0.10
1200	68.0	5.9	59	9.5	0.09
1250	72.9	4.9	98	15.7	0.14
1300	78.7	5.8	116	15.7	0.15
1350	70.7	−8.0	−160	−0.8	−0.21
1400	78.1	7.4	148	−0.8	0.20
1450	83.0	4.9	98	16.1	0.12
1500	90.7	7.7	154	16.1	0.18

European population by country or region in millions, years 1000–1500
Country/Region	1000	1100	1200	1250	1300	1350	1400	1450	1500
German Empire (Note: As of 1914.)	5.4	6.4	7.3	8	9.1	8.5	9.6	10.2	10.8
France	9	11	13	15	17	15	14	14	15.5
England and Wales	1.6	1.8	2.3	2.6	3	2.4	3	3.3	3.6
Scotland	0.3	0.3	0.3	0.4	0.4	0.3	0.4	0.5	0.6
Ireland	0.6	0.6	0.6	0.7	0.7	0.6	0.7	0.7	0.8
Italy	7	7.5	8	9	10	8	10	10.5	11
Spain and Portugal	9	8	7	6.5	6	5	6	7	8.5
Austria-Hungary (Note: As of 1914 (including the Czech Republic, Slovakia, Slovenia, Croatia, Bosnia-Herzegovina, Galicia-Lodomeria, Vojvodina, Transylvania).)	5.4	6.2	7.2	8	9	8	9	10	11.5
The Balkans (Note: Romania, Bulgaria, Greece, North Macedonia, Albania, Montenegro, Serbia, Turkish Thrace.)	7	7.5	8	8	8	7	8	8	8
Denmark	0.5	0.5	0.6	0.6	0.7	0.6	0.6	0.6	0.6
Sweden	0.4	0.4	0.4	0.5	0.5	0.4	0.5	0.6	0.65
Norway	0.2	0.2	0.2	0.2	0.3	0.3	0.3	0.3	0.3
Switzerland	0.4	0.4	0.5	0.6	0.7	0.6	0.7	0.7	0.75
Belgium	0.6	0.7	0.9	1	1.2	1	1.2	1.3	1.5
Netherlands	0.5	0.6	0.7	0.8	0.9	0.8	0.9	1.1	1.3
North-Eastern Europe (Note: European Russia, Belarus, Ukraine, Moldova, Poland, the Baltics, Finland.)	8.5	10	11	11	11	12	13	14	15.1
Others (Note: Iceland, Luxembourg, Liechtenstein, Monaco, San Marino, Andorra, Malta.)	<0.1	<0.1	<0.1	<0.1	0.2	0.2	0.2	0.2	0.2
Total	56.4	62.1	68	72.9	78.7	70.7	78.1	83	90.7

== Major scholars on medieval demography ==
- Thomas Robert Malthus – founder of demography centered the Malthusian model of economic history.
- Michael Postan – prominent scholar of the Malthusian model of medieval demographics.
- Robert Brenner – prominent scholar of the Marxist model of medieval demographics, centered on social class and economic structure instead of population growth alone.
- Karl Julius Beloch
- Fernand Braudel

== See also ==
- Historical demography
- Classical demography
- Early modern demography
- Crisis of the Late Middle Ages
- Dark Ages (historiography)
- Life expectancy
- List of famines
- List of disasters
- Little Ice Age
- Medieval household
- Migration Period
- Slavery in medieval Europe

== Bibliography ==
- Herlihy, David (1982), "Medieval Demography", in Strayer, Joseph R. (ed.), Dictionary of the Middle Ages, vol. 4, New York: Scribner, pp. 136–148, ISBN 0-684-17024-8.
- Duby, Georges (September 1977), Histoire de la France, Paris: Larousse, p. 190, ISBN 2030799513
- Urlanis, B T︠S︡ (1941). Rost naselenii︠a︡ v Evrope : opyt ischislenii︠a︡ [Population growth in Europe] (in Russian). Moskva: OGIZ-Gospolitizdat. OCLC 42379320.
