= Črni Vrh, Tabor =

Črni Vrh
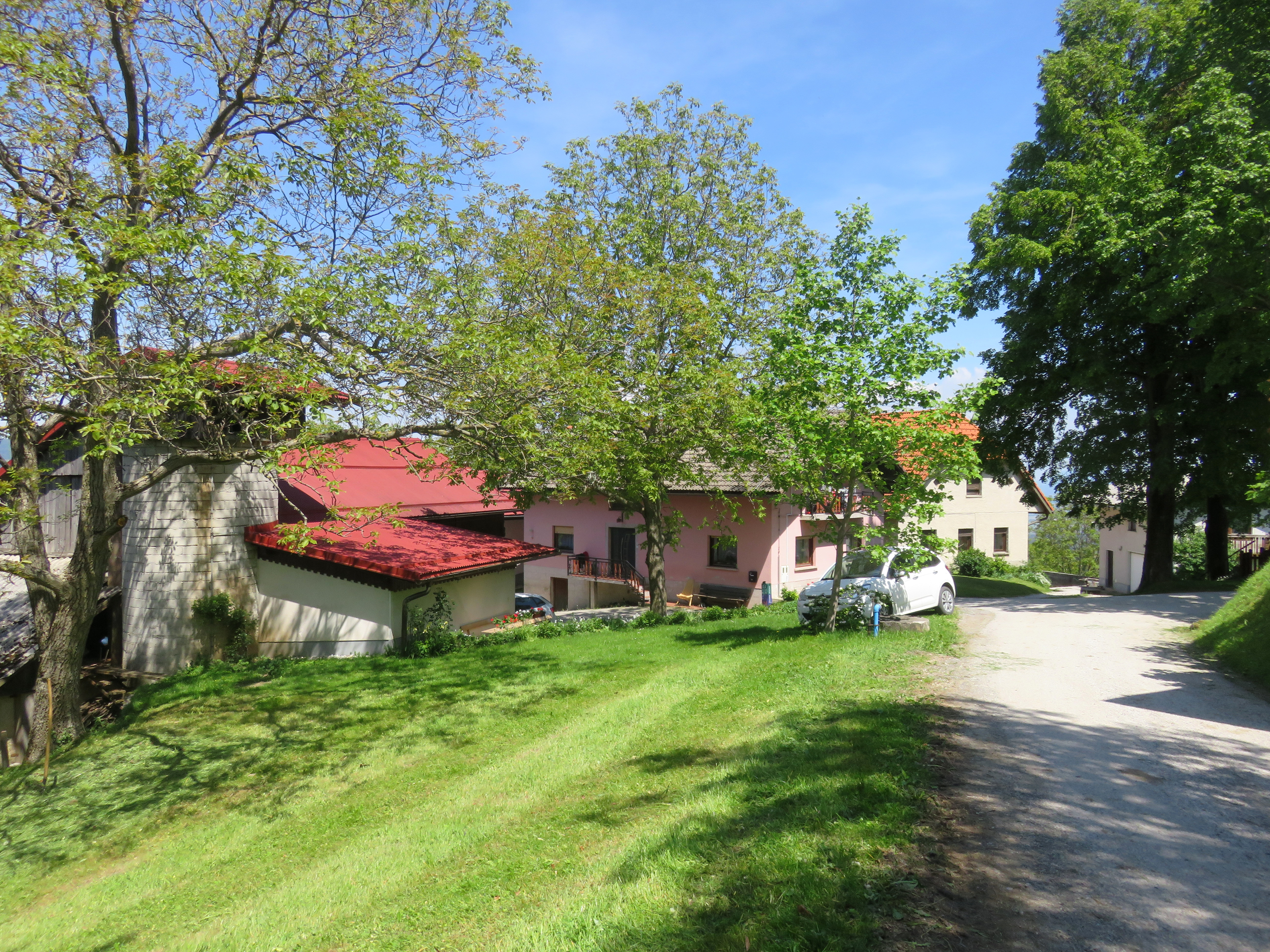

- Location in Slovenia
- Coordinates: 46°13′5.14″N 14°58′36.95″E
- Country: Slovenia
- Traditional region: Styria
- Statistical region: Savinja
- Municipality: Tabor

Area
  - Total: 7.55 km^{2} (2.92 sq mi)
- Elevation: 582.7 m (1,912 ft)

Population (2002)
  - Total: 164

Črni Vrh (pronounced [ˈtʃəɾni ˈʋəɾx]; German: Schwarzenberg) is a dispersed settlement in the Municipality of Tabor in central Slovenia. The area is part of the traditional region of Styria. The municipality is now included in the Savinja Statistical Region.
