= Pondor =

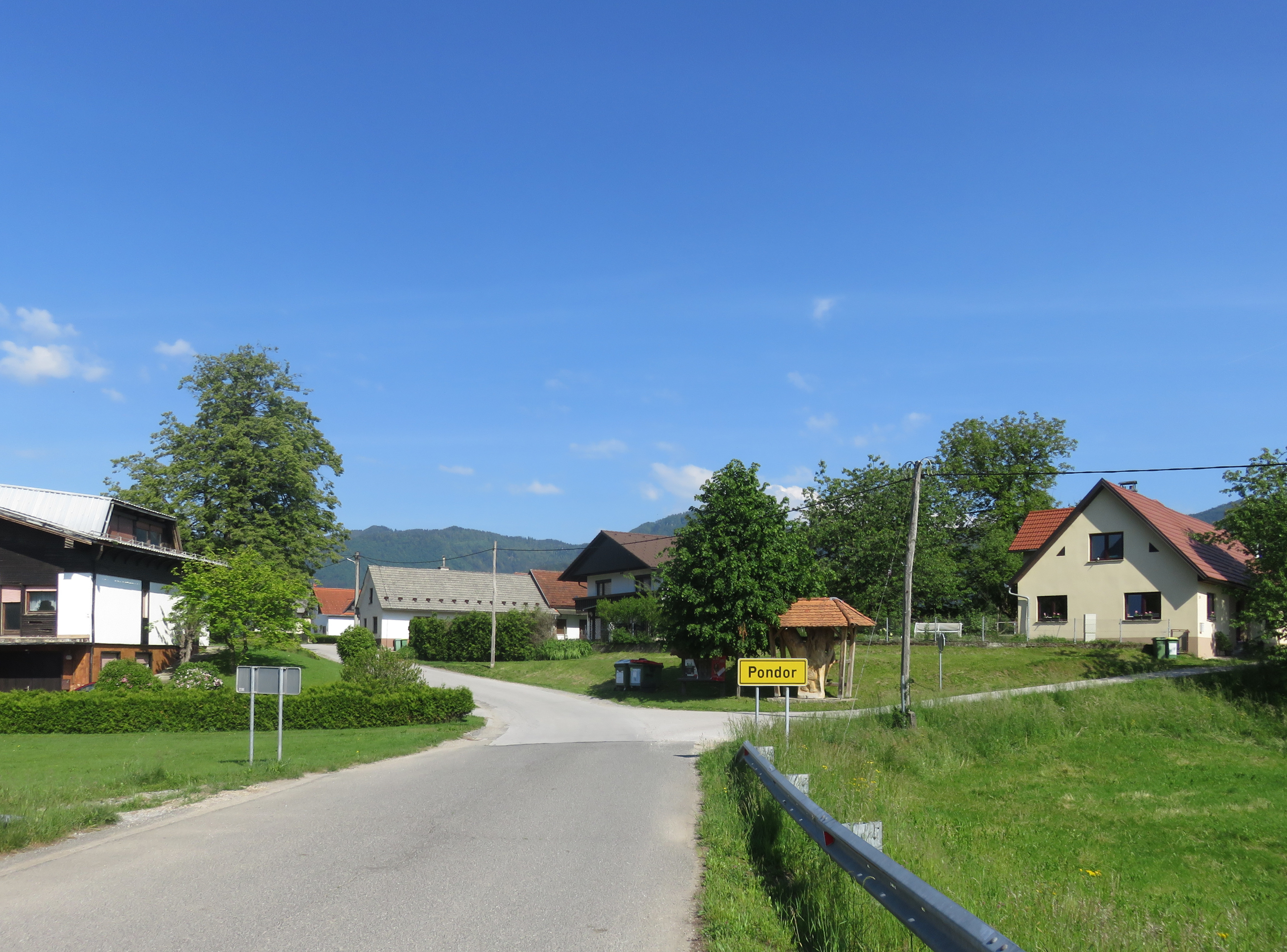

- Location in Slovenia
- Coordinates: 46°14′38.11″N 15°0′3.28″E
- Country: Slovenia
- Traditional region: Styria
- Statistical region: Savinja
- Municipality: Tabor

Area
  - Total: 1.31 km^{2} (0.51 sq mi)
- Elevation: 311 m (1,020 ft)

Population (2002)
  - Total: 157

Pondor (pronounced [pɔnˈdoːɾ]; German: Opendorf) is a small village in the Municipality of Tabor in central Slovenia. It lies on the edge of the Savinja Valley, just off the regional road from Vransko to Šempeter v Savinjski Dolini. The area is part of the traditional region of Styria. The municipality is now included in the Savinja Statistical Region.
