= Ojstriška Vas =

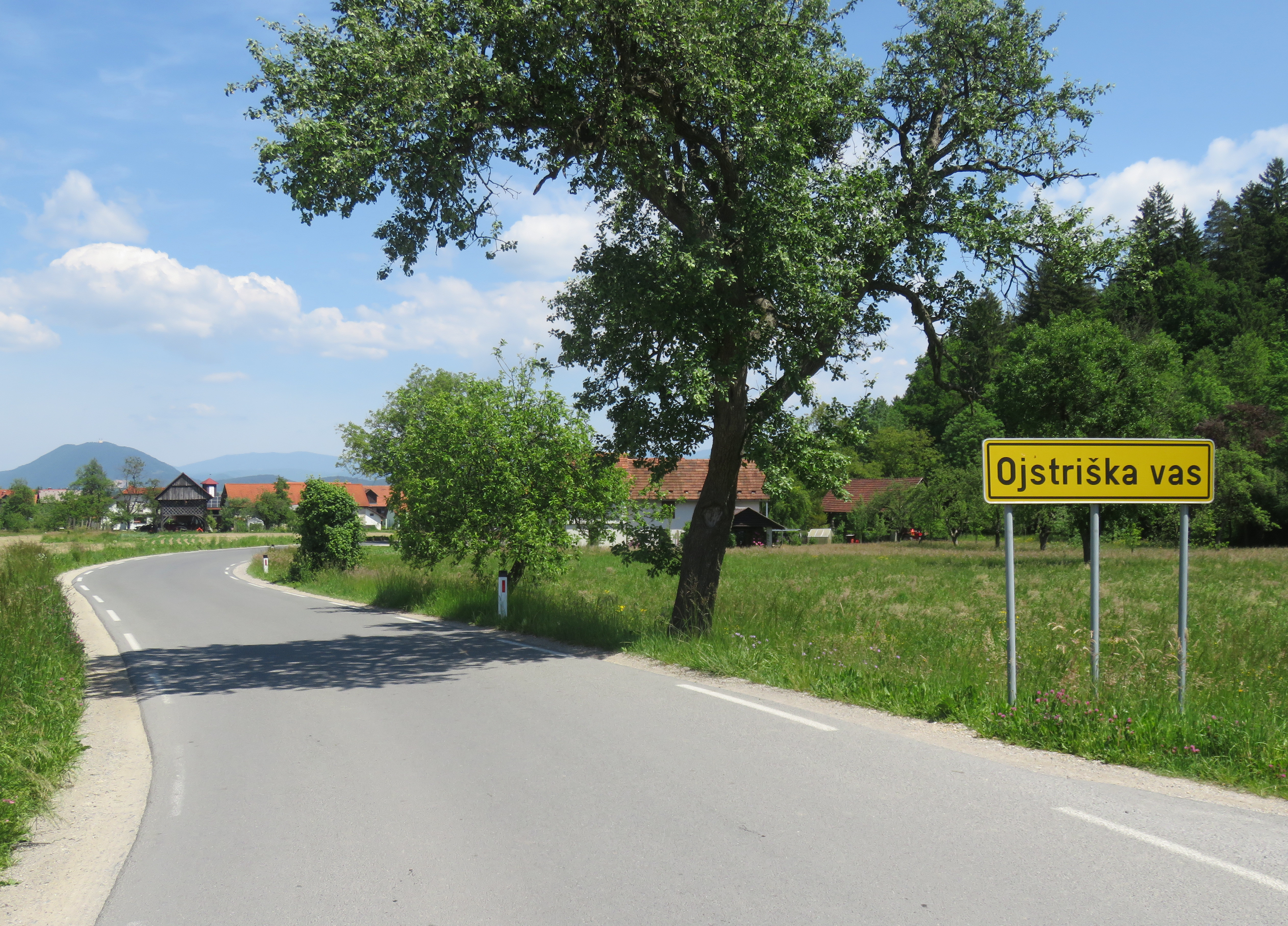

- Location in Slovenia
- Coordinates: 46°14′25.47″N 15°1′13.77″E
- Country: Slovenia
- Traditional region: Styria
- Statistical region: Savinja
- Municipality: Tabor

Area
  - Total: 1.3 km^{2} (0.50 sq mi)
- Elevation: 313.8 m (1,030 ft)

Population (2002)
  - Total: 256

Ojstriška Vas (pronounced [ˈoːi̯striʃka ˈʋaːs]; Slovene: Ojstriška vas; German: Osterwitzdorf) is a village in the Municipality of Tabor in central Slovenia. The area is part of the traditional region of Styria and is now included in the Savinja Statistical Region.
