= Municipality of Tabor =

Municipality of Slovenia

Municipality of Tabor Občina Tabor
- Municipality
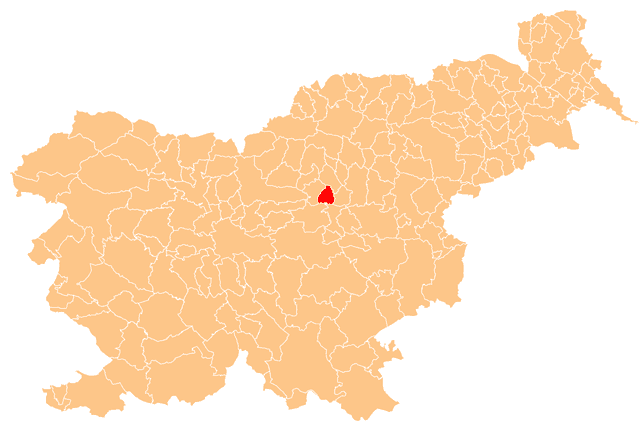
- Location of the Municipality of Tabor in Slovenia
- Coordinates: 46°13′21″N 15°0′29″E
- Country: Slovenia

Government
  - Mayor: Marko Semprimožnik

Area
  - Total: 34.8 km^{2} (13.4 sq mi)

Population (2020)
  - Total: 1,669
  - Density: 48.0/km^{2} (124/sq mi)
- Time zone: UTC+01 (CET)
  - Summer (DST): UTC+02 (CEST)
- Website: www.obcina-tabor.si

The Municipality of Tabor (pronounced [ˈtaːbɔɾ]; Slovene: Občina Tabor) is a municipality in central Slovenia. The seat of the municipality is the village of Tabor. It lies on the edge of the Lower Savinja Valley at the northern edge of the Sava Hills. The area is part of the traditional region of Styria. It is now included in the Savinja Statistical Region.

== Settlements ==
In addition to the municipal seat of Tabor, the municipality also includes the following settlements:

- Črni Vrh
- Kapla
- Loke
- Miklavž pri Taboru
- Ojstriška Vas
- Pondor
