= Miklavž pri Taboru =

Miklavž pri Taboru Sveti Miklavž pri Taboru (until 1955)
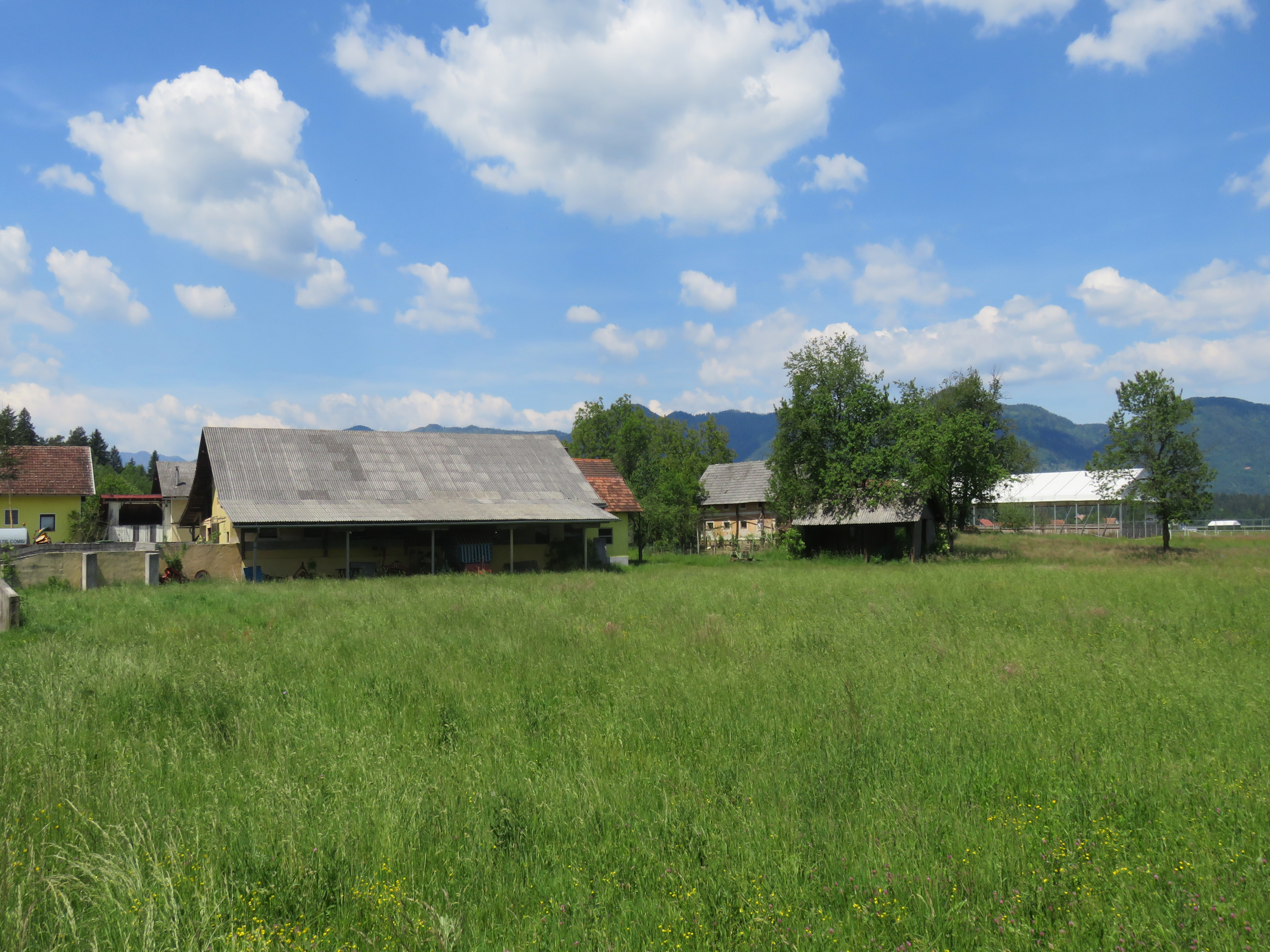
- The hamlet of Trnje in Miklavž pri Taboru

- Location in Slovenia
- Coordinates: 46°13′26.83″N 15°2′2.74″E
- Country: Slovenia
- Traditional region: Styria
- Statistical region: Savinja
- Municipality: Tabor

Area
  - Total: 12.87 km^{2} (4.97 sq mi)
- Elevation: 431.7 m (1,416 ft)

Population (2002)
  - Total: 160

Miklavž pri Taboru (pronounced [miˈklaːu̯ʃ pɾi ˈtaːbɔɾju]) is a dispersed settlement in the Municipality of Tabor in central Slovenia. The area is part of the traditional region of Styria. The municipality is now included in the Savinja Statistical Region.

== Name ==
The name of the settlement was changed from Sveti Miklavž pri Taboru (literally, 'Saint Nicholas near Tabor') to Miklavž pri Taboru (literally, 'Nicholas near Tabor') in 1955. The name was changed on the basis of the 1948 Law on Names of Settlements and Designations of Squares, Streets, and Buildings as part of efforts by Slovenia's postwar communist government to remove religious elements from toponyms.

== Church ==
The local church from which the settlement gets its name is dedicated to Saint Nicholas (Slovene: sveti Miklavž) and belongs to the Parish of Sveti Jurij ob Taboru. It is a 15th-century church that was greatly rebuilt in the 19th century.
