= Great Famine of 1315–1317 =

Famine of medieval Europe

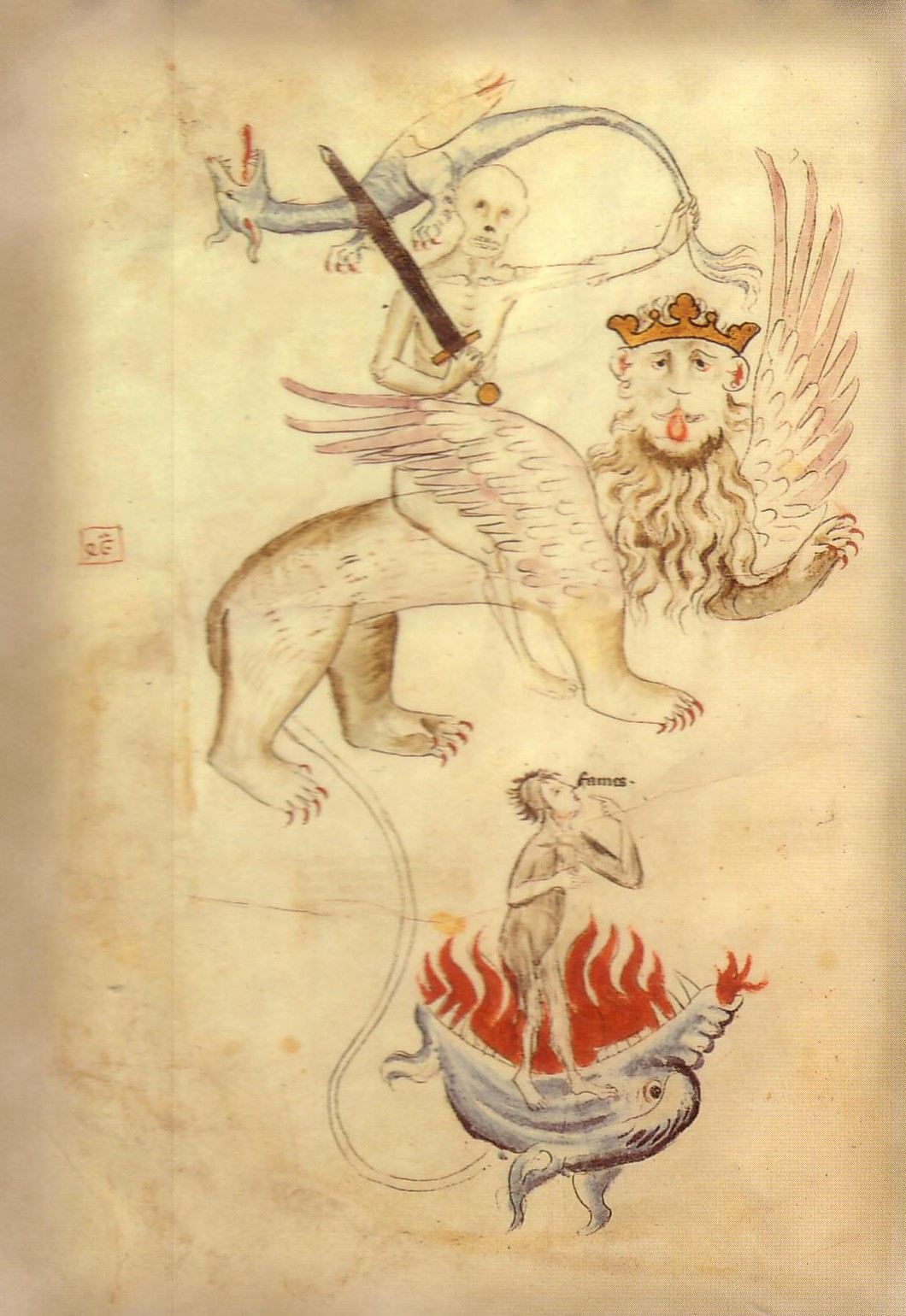
From the Apocalypse in a Biblia Pauperum, illuminated at Erfurt around the time of the Great Famine. Death sits astride a manticore whose long tail ends in a ball of flame (Hell). Famine points to her hungry mouth.

The Great Famine of 1315–1317 (occasionally dated 1315–1322) was the first of a series of large-scale crises that struck parts of Europe early in the 14th century. Most of Europe (extending east to Poland and south to the Alps) was affected. The famine caused widespread population loss over an extended number of years, marking a clear end to the period of growth and prosperity from the 11th to the 13th centuries.

The Great Famine started with bad weather in spring 1315. Crop failures lasted through 1316 until the summer harvest in 1317, and Europe did not fully recover until 1322. Crop failures were not the only problem; weakened cattle were susceptible to disease and the resulting Great Bovine Pestilence caused sheep and cattle numbers to fall as much as 80 per cent. The period was marked by extreme levels of crime, disease, mass death, and even cannibalism and infanticide. The crisis had consequences for the Church, state, European society, and for future calamities to follow in the 14th century.

== Background ==
Famines were familiar occurrences in medieval Europe. For example, localised famines occurred in the Kingdom of France during the 14th century in 1304, 1305, 1310, 1315–1317 (the Great Famine), 1330–1334, 1349–1351, 1358–1360, 1371, 1374–1375 and 1390. In the Kingdom of England, the most prosperous kingdom affected by the Great Famine, there were additional famines in 1321, 1351 and 1369. According to official records about the English royal family, an example of the best off in society, for whom records were kept, the average life expectancy at birth in 1276 was 35.28 years. Between 1301 and 1325, during the Great Famine it was 29.84 years, but between 1348 and 1375 during the Plague, it was only 17.33 years. The average life expectancy figures are skewed by child mortality rates, which were naturally high even during non-famine years. However, this demonstrates the steep population drop between 1348 and 1375 of about 42%.

During the Medieval Warm Period (10th to 13th centuries), the population of Europe rapidly increased compared to prior eras and reached levels that were not matched again in some places until the 19th century. Indeed, parts of rural France are still less populous than in the early 14th century. The yield ratios of wheat (the number of seeds one could harvest and consume per seed planted) had been dropping since 1280, and food prices had been increasing. After favourable harvests, the ratio could be as high as 7:1, but after unfavourable harvests it was as low as 2:1—that is, for every seed planted, two seeds were harvested, one for next year's seed, and one for food. By comparison, modern farming has ratios of 30:1 or more (see agricultural productivity).

The onset of the Great Famine followed the end of the Medieval Warm Period. Between 1310 and 1330, Northern Europe saw some of the worst and most sustained periods of bad weather in the Middle Ages, characterized by severe winters and rainy and cold summers. The Great Famine may have been precipitated by a volcanic event and occurred during the Little Ice Age. Changing weather patterns, the ineffectiveness of medieval governments in dealing with crises, and population level at a historical high made it a time with little margin for error in food production.

== Great Famine ==
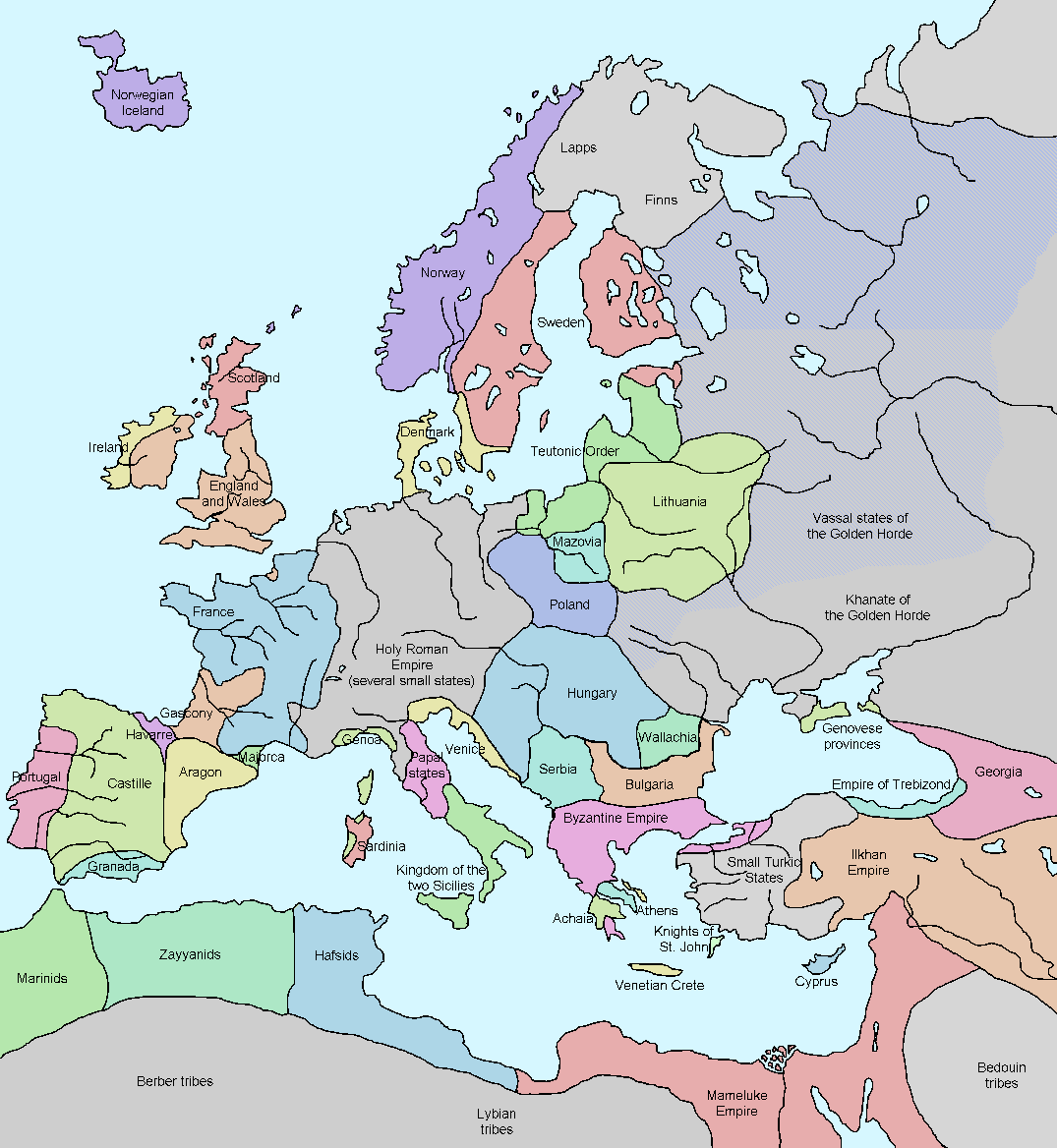
Europe in 1328

In the spring of 1315, unusually heavy rain began in much of Europe. Throughout the spring and the summer, it continued to rain, and the temperature remained cool. Under such conditions, grain could not ripen, leading to widespread crop failures. Grains were brought indoors in urns and pots to keep dry. The straw and hay for the animals could not be cured, so there was no fodder for the livestock. The soil became extremely moist from the heavy rain, making it impossible to plow the fields ready for planting. In England, lowlands in Yorkshire and Nottingham were flooded, while stew ponds on the River Foss in Yorkshire were washed away.

The price of food began to rise. Prices in England doubled between spring and midsummer. Salt, the only way to cure and preserve meat, was difficult to obtain because brine could not be effectively evaporated in wet weather. As a result, its price increased from 30 to 40 shillings. In Lorraine, wheat prices rose by 320%, making bread unaffordable to peasants. Stores of grain for long-term emergencies were limited to royalty, lords, nobles, wealthy merchants and the Church. Because of the general increased population pressures, even lower-than-average harvests meant some people would go hungry; there was little margin for failure. People began to harvest wild edible roots, grasses, nuts and bark in the forests.

A number of documented incidents show the extent of the famine. Edward II of England stopped at St Albans on 10 August 1315 and had difficulty finding bread for himself and his entourage; it was a rare occasion on which the king of England was unable to eat. In Bristol, the city's chronicles reported that in 1315 there was "a great Famine of Dearth with such mortality that the living could scarce suffice to bury the dead, horse flesh and dogs flesh was accounted good meat, and some eat their own children. The thieves that were in Prison did pluck and tear in pieces, such as were newly put into prison and devoured them half alive."

In spring 1316, it continued to rain on a European population deprived of energy and reserves to sustain itself. All segments of society from nobles to peasants were affected but especially the peasants, who represented 95% of the population and who had no reserve food supplies. To provide some measure of relief, the future was mortgaged by slaughtering the draft animals, eating the seed grain, abandoning children to fend for themselves (such as in the folk tale "Hansel and Gretel") and, among old people, voluntary starvation so that the younger generation could continue to work the fields. The chroniclers of the time noted many incidents of cannibalism. It was reported that during the famine, people would open the graves of the newly dead and claim them as food.

The height of the famine was in 1317, as the wet weather continued. In that summer, the weather returned to normal patterns. By then, people were so weakened by diseases such as pneumonia, bronchitis and tuberculosis, and so much of the seed stock had been eaten, that it was not until 1325 that the food supply returned to relatively normal levels and the population began to increase. Historians debate the toll, but it is estimated that 10–25% of the population of many cities and towns died. Though the Black Death (1347–1351) would kill more people, it often swept through an area in a matter of months, whereas the Great Famine lingered for years, prolonging the suffering of the populace.

Jean-Pierre Leguay noted the Great Famine "produced wholesale slaughter in a world that was already overcrowded, especially in the towns, which were natural outlets for rural overpopulation". Estimates of death rates vary by place, but some examples include a loss of 10–15% in the south of England. Northern France lost about 10% of its population.

=== Geography and hydroclimate context ===
The Great Famine was restricted to Northern Europe, including the British Isles, Northern France, the Low Countries, Scandinavia, Germany, and western Poland. It also affected some of the Baltic states except for the far eastern Baltic, which was affected only indirectly. The famine was bounded to the south by the Alps and the Pyrenees.

The 1314–1316 period was the fifth-wettest three-year interval in Europe from 1300 to 2012. Of the four wetter periods, three occurred after 1710 when agricultural technology was much more productive, while one occurred after the Black Death when population size had already been reduced. The Great Famine's exceptional severity was due to extreme precipitation coinciding with peak medieval population and pre-industrial agriculture, creating an extreme vulnerability to sustained adverse weather.

== Consequences ==
The Great Famine is noteworthy for the number of people who died, the vast geographic area that was affected, its length, and its lasting consequences.

=== Church ===
When God saw that the world was so over proud,
He sent a dearth on earth, and made it full hard.
A bushel of wheat was at four shillings or more,
Of which men might have had a quarter before ...
And then they turned pale who had laughed so loud,
And they became all docile who before were so proud.
A man's heart might bleed for to hear the cry
Of poor men who called out, "Alas! For hunger I die ...!"

— Poem on the Evil Times of Edward II, c. 1321

Nearly all European societies at that time attributed natural disasters as divine retribution for their apparent misdeeds, and religion was regarded as final recourse for nearly all problems. However, no amount of prayer seemed effective against the root causes of the famine. This undermined the institutional authority of the Catholic Church, which established the limits of accepted faith. This weakening of the Church's authority subsequently contributed to the emergence and spreading of movements that were deemed heretical by the Church, as they opposed the papacy and blamed the perceived failure of prayer upon corruption and doctrinal errors within the Church itself.

=== Culture ===
Medieval Europe in the 14th century had already experienced widespread social violence, and even acts then punishable by death such as rape and murder were demonstrably far more common (especially relative to the population size), compared with modern times.

The famine led to a stark increase in crime, even among those not normally inclined to criminal activity, because people would resort to any means to feed themselves or their families. For the next several decades after the famine, Europe took on a tougher and more violent edge. It became an even less amicable place than during the 12th and the 13th centuries. This could be seen across all segments of society, perhaps most strikingly in the way warfare was conducted in the 14th century during the Hundred Years' War, when chivalry ended, as opposed to the 12th and the 13th centuries when nobles were more likely to die by accident in tournament games than on the field of battle.

The famine undermined confidence in medieval governments, due to their failure to deal with its resulting crises. This had particularly dire consequences for Edward II, who was already an unpopular monarch. While the famine was seen as divine retribution both in England and on the Continent, the English were more inclined to blame their misfortune on the perceived misrule and immorality of the king as opposed to alleged misconduct within the Church. This contributed to his downfall in 1327.

=== Population ===
The Great Famine ended an era of unprecedented population growth that had started circa 1050. Although some believe growth had already been slowing down for several decades, the famine brought this period to an undisputed conclusion. The Great Famine's impacts also affected future events in the 14th century, such as the Black Death, when an already weakened population would suffer an additional calamity.

== See also ==
- List of incidents of cannibalism
- List of famines
- Popular revolts in late medieval Europe
