= Crisis of the late Middle Ages =

Instability in 14th–15th century Europe

- c. 1300 – c. 1500
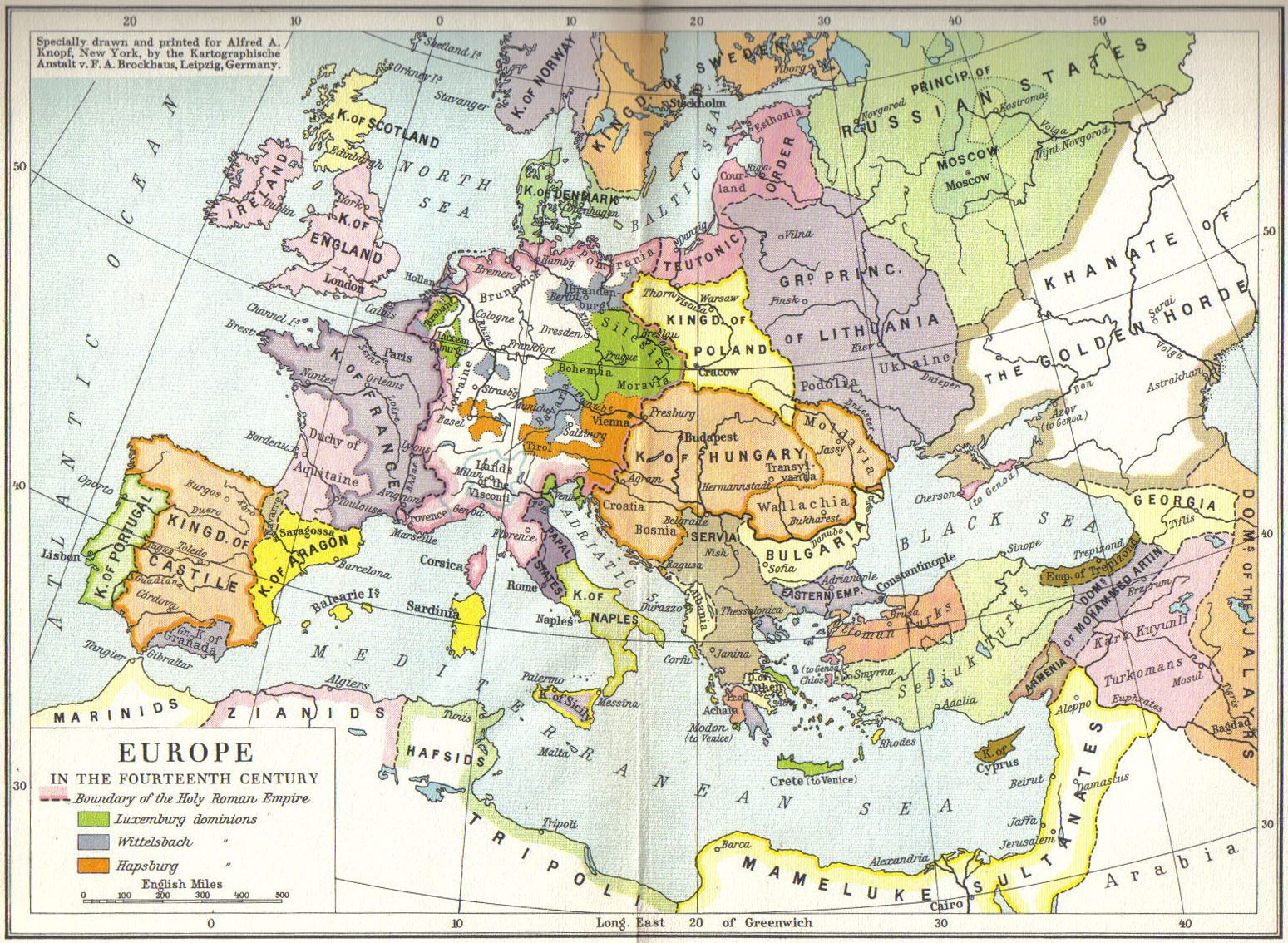
- Europe and the surrounding areas in the 14th century
- Key events: Great Famine of 1315–1317; Black Death; Western Schism; Popular revolts in late medieval Europe; Hundred Years' War; Great Bullion Famine

The crisis of the late Middle Ages was a series of events across Europe during the late Middle Ages. These events involved extensive demographic collapse, political instability, and religious upheaval. Collectively, they marked the end of a centuries-long period of relative stability in Europe, and reshaped regional societies. This crisis period coincides with a shift in the regional climate from the Medieval Warm Period to the Little Ice Age.

The events of the crisis include the Great Famine of 1315–1317 and the Black Death of 1347–1351, which caused very high mortality across the region. The population did not increase to pre-crisis levels until about 1500.

Warfare and popular revolts proliferated across the continent, including the English Wars of the Roses, the French Armagnac–Burgundian Civil War, the Hundred Years' War, the Byzantine–Ottoman wars, and the Bulgarian–Ottoman wars. The Catholic Church underwent the Western Schism, and the Holy Roman Empire lost much of its central authority following the Great Interregnum (1247–1273), to the advantage of the German princes.

== Historiography ==
The expression "crisis of the late Middle Ages" is commonly used in western European historiography, especially in English and German, and somewhat less by other western European scholars, to refer to the array of crises besetting Europe in the 14th and 15th centuries. The expression often carries a specification such as the urban crisis of the late Middle Ages, or the cultural, monastic, religious, social, economic, intellectual, or agrarian crisis, or a regional focus such as the Catalan or French crisis.

By 1929, French historian Marc Bloch was already writing about the effects of the crisis, and by mid-century there were academic debates being held about it. In his 1981 article "Late Middle Age Agrarian Crisis or Crisis of Feudalism?", Peter Kriedte reprises some of the early works in the field by historians writing in the 1930s, including Marc Bloch, Henri Pirenne, Wilhelm Abel, and Michael Postan. Referring to the crisis in Italy as the "Crisis of the 14th Century", Giovanni Cherubini alluded to the debate that had already been going on "for several decades" in 1974, in French, British, American, and German historiography.

Arno Borst (1992) states that "it is a given that fourteenth-century Latin Christianity was in a crisis". He goes on to say that the intellectual aspects, as well as how universities were affected by the crisis, have hitherto been underrepresented in academic debate and works ("When we discuss the crisis of the late Middle Ages, we consider intellectual movements beside religious, social, and economic ones"), and gives some examples.

Some scholars question whether "crisis" is the correct expression for the period at the end of the Middle Ages and the transition to modernity. In his article "The End of the Middle Ages: Decline, Crisis or Transformation?" (1981), Donald Sullivan addresses this question. He claims that scholars have neglected the period, viewing it largely as a precursor to subsequent climactic events such as the Renaissance and Reformation.

In his "Introduction to the History of the Middle Ages in Europe", Mitre Fernández wrote in 2004: "To talk about a general crisis of the late Middle Ages is already a commonplace in the study of mediaeval history."

In his book on the religious crisis of the late Middle Ages (2012), Heribert Müller discussed whether the term itself was in crisis:

No doubt the thesis of the crisis of the late Middle Ages has itself been in crisis for some time now, and hardly anyone considered an expert in the field would still profess it without some ifs and buts, and especially so in the case of German Medieval historians.

In his historiographical article about the crisis in the Middle Ages (2014), Peter Schuster quotes the historian Léopold Genicot's 1971 article "Crisis: From the Middle Ages to Modern Times": "Crisis is the word which comes immediately to the historian's mind when he thinks of the fourteenth and the fifteenth centuries."

== Demography ==
The Medieval Warm Period ended at some time towards the end of the 13th century. This marked the start of the Little Ice Age, which resulted in harsher winters with reduced harvests. In Northern Europe, new technological innovations such as the heavy plough and the three-field system were not as effective in clearing new fields for harvest as they were in the Mediterranean because the north had poor, clay-like soil. Food shortages and rapidly inflating prices were a fact of life for as much as a century before the plague. Wheat, oats, hay and consequently livestock were all in short supply.

Their scarcity resulted in malnutrition, which increased susceptibility to infections due to weakened immune systems. In the autumn of 1314, heavy rains began to fall, which were the start of several years of cold and wet winters. The already weak harvests of the north suffered, and a seven-year famine ensued. Between 1315 and 1317, a catastrophic famine, known as the Great Famine, struck much of North-West Europe. It was arguably the worst in European history, possibly reducing the population by more than 10%.

Most governments instituted measures that prohibited exports of foodstuffs, condemned black market speculators, set price controls on grain and outlawed large-scale fishing. At best these regulations proved mostly unenforceable, and at worst they contributed to a continent-wide downward spiral. The hardest-hit lands, like England, were unable to buy grain from France because of the prohibition, or from most of the rest of the grain producers because of crop failures due to labour shortage. All grain that could be shipped was eventually taken by pirates or looters to be sold on the black market.

Meanwhile, many of the largest countries, most notably England and Scotland, had been at war. This resulted in their using up much of their treasury and creating inflation. In 1337, on the eve of the first wave of the Black Death, England and France went to war in what became known as the Hundred Years' War. This situation further deteriorated when landowners and monarchs such as Edward III of England (r. 1327–1377) and Philip VI of France (r. 1328–1350) increased their tenants' fines and rents due to fear that their comparatively high standard of living would decline.

When a typhoid epidemic emerged, many thousands died in populated urban centres, most significantly Ypres (now in Belgium). In 1318, a pestilence of unknown origin, which some contemporary scholars now identify as anthrax, targeted the animals of Europe. Sheep and cattle were particularly affected, further reducing the food supply and income of the peasantry.

== Little Ice Age and the Great Famine ==
As Europe moved out of the Medieval Warm Period and into the Little Ice Age, a decrease in temperature and a great number of devastating floods disrupted harvests and caused mass famine. The cold and the rain proved to be particularly disastrous from 1315 to 1317, when bad weather disrupted the maturation of many grains and beans, and flooding turned fields rocky and barren. The scarcity of grain caused price inflation, as described in one account of grain prices in Europe in which the price of wheat doubled from twenty shillings per quarter in 1315 to forty shillings per quarter by June of the following year. Grape harvests also suffered, which reduced wine production throughout Europe. The wine production from the vineyards surrounding the Abbey of Saint-Arnould in France decreased as much as 80% by 1317.

During this climatic change and subsequent famine, Europe's cattle were struck with The Great Bovine Pestilence, a pathogen of unknown identity. The pathogen spread throughout Europe from Eastern Asia in 1315 and reached the British Isles by 1319. Manorial accounts of cattle populations in the year 1319–20 mention a 62% loss in England and Wales alone. In these countries, some correlation can be found between the places where bad weather reduced crop harvests and those where the bovine population was particularly negatively affected. It is hypothesised that low temperatures and lack of nutrition alike were responsible for decreasing the cattle populations' immune systems, making them vulnerable to disease. The mass illness and subsequent deaths of cattle drastically affected dairy production, and the output did not return to its pre-pestilence amount until 1331. Much of the medieval peasants' protein was obtained from dairy produce, and milk shortages probably caused nutritional deficiencies in the European population. Famine and pestilence, exacerbated by the prevalence of war during this time, resulted in the death of an estimated 10% to 15% of Europe's population.

== Climate change and plague pandemic correlation ==
The Black Death was a particularly devastating epidemic in Europe during this time, and is remarkable due to the number of people who succumbed to the disease within the few years when the disease was active. It was fatal to an estimated 30% to 60% of the population where the disease was present. While there is some question of whether it was a particularly deadly strain of Yersinia pestis that caused the Black Death, research indicates no significant difference in bacterial phenotype. Environmental stressors are therefore considered when hypothesising the deadliness of the Black Plague, such as crop failures due to changes in weather, the subsequent famine, and an influx of host rats into Europe from China.

== Popular revolt ==
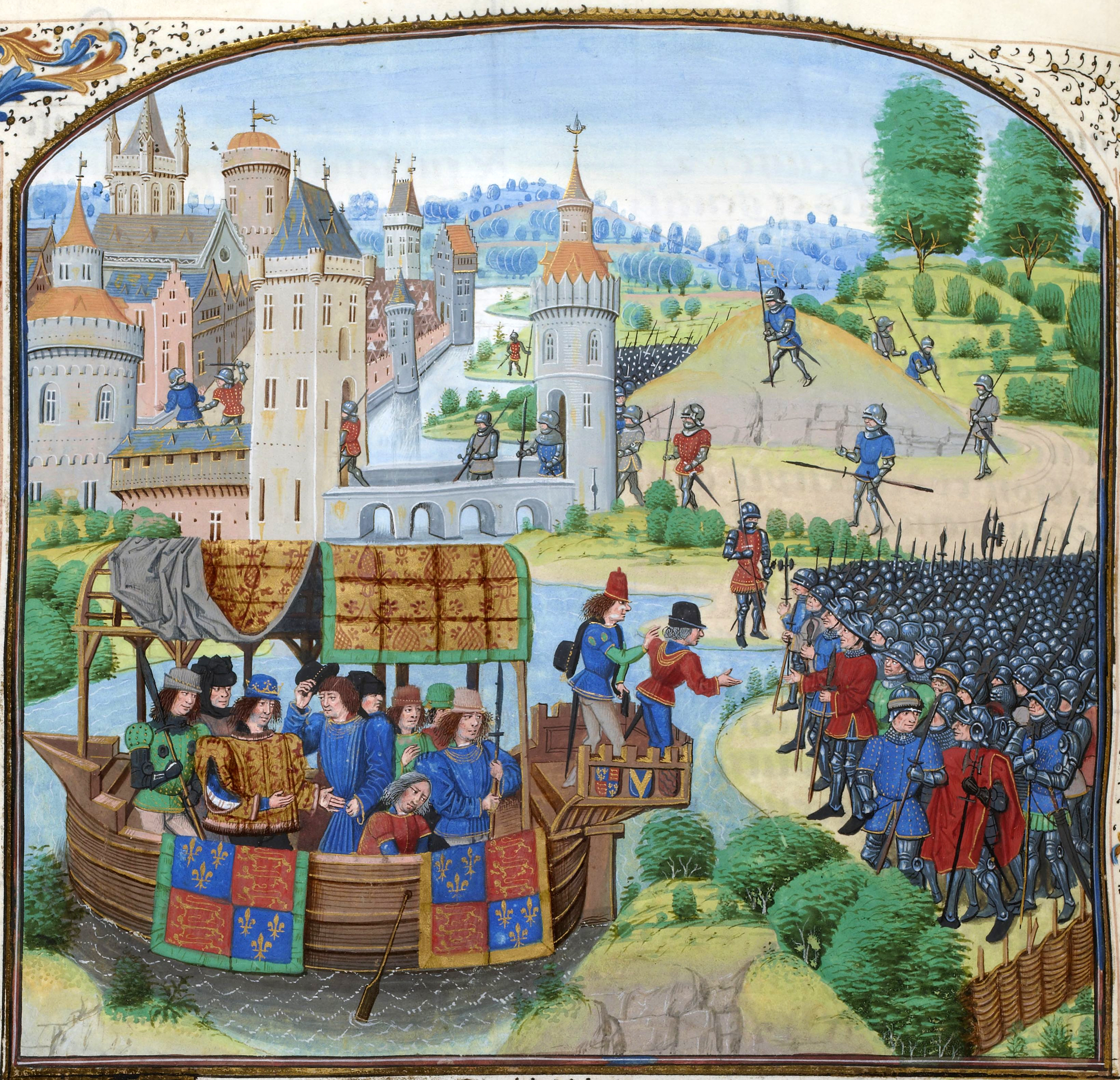
Richard II of England meets the rebels of the Peasants' Revolt of 1381.

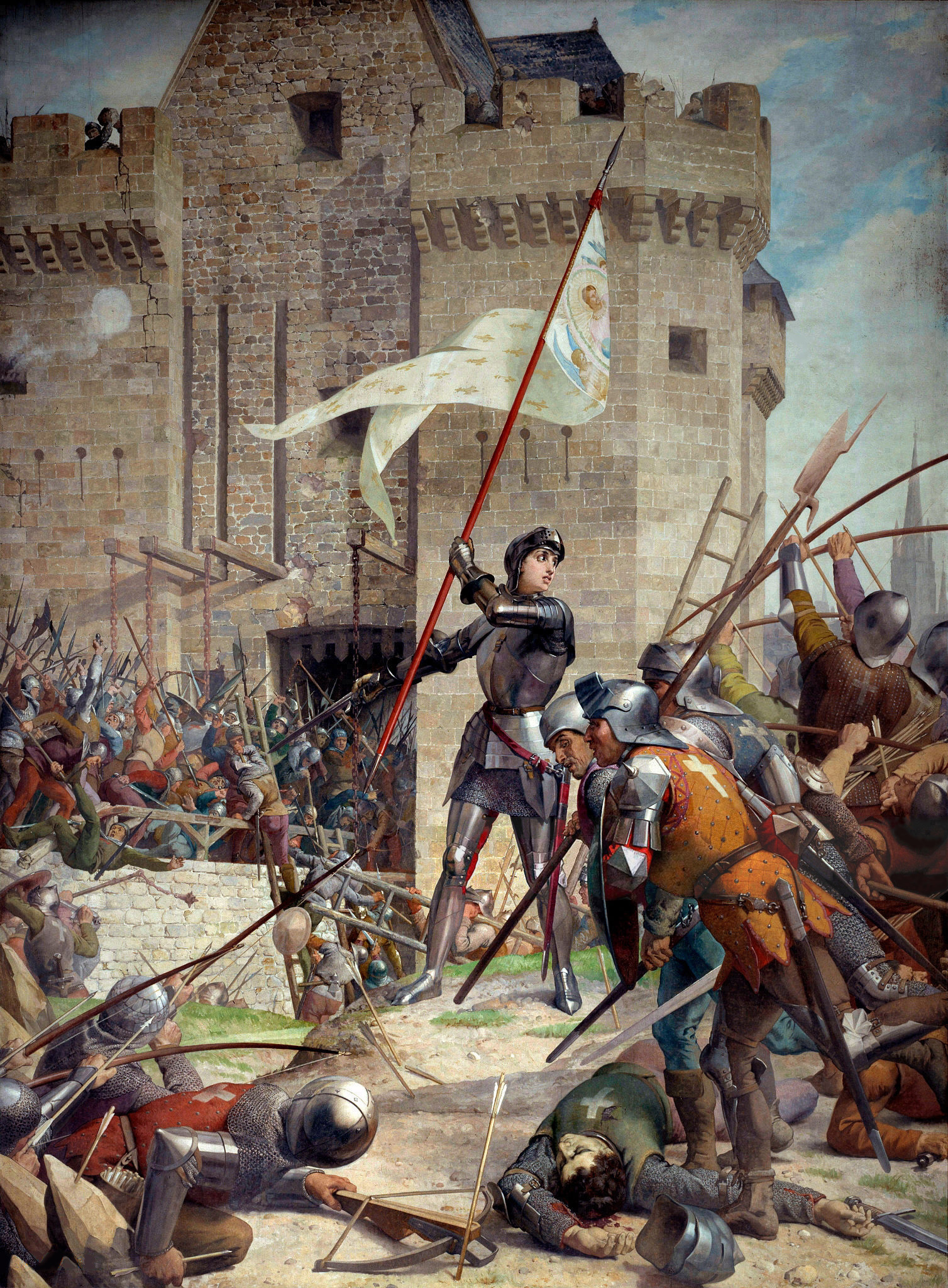
Joan of Arc during the Siege of Orléans (1428–1429)

There were some popular uprisings in Europe before the 14th century, but these were local in scope, for example uprisings at a manor house against an unpleasant overlord. This changed in the 14th and 15th centuries when new downward pressures on the poor resulted in mass movements and popular uprisings across Europe. To indicate how common and widespread these movements became, there were no fewer than 60 phases of militant peasant unrest in Germany between 1336 and 1525.

== Malthusian hypothesis ==
Scholars such as David Herlihy and Michael Postan use the term Malthusian limit to explain some calamities as the result of overpopulation. In Essay on the Principle of Population (1798), Thomas Malthus asserted that exponential population growth will invariably exceed available resources, making mass death inevitable. In his book The Black Death and the Transformation of the West, David Herlihy explores whether the plague was an inevitable result of overpopulation and insufficient resources.

Herlihy also examined the arguments against the Malthusian crisis, stating "if the Black Death was a response to excessive human numbers it should have arrived several decades earlier" in consequence of the population growth before the Black Death. Herlihy also mentions other, biological factors that argue against the plague as a "reckoning" by arguing "the role of famines in affecting population movements is also problematic. The many famines preceding the Black Death, even the 'great hunger' of 1315 to 1317, did not result in any appreciable reduction in population levels". Herlihy concludes as follows: "The medieval experience shows us not a Malthusian crisis but a stalemate, in the sense that the community was maintaining at stable levels very large numbers over a lengthy period", and stating that the phenomenon should be referred to as more of a deadlock, rather than a crisis, to describe Europe before the epidemics.

== See also ==
- A Distant Mirror: The Calamitous 14th Century
- Crisis of the Third Century
- History of science in the Middle Ages
- Renaissance of the 12th century
- The Autumn of the Middle Ages
- The General Crisis

== Bibliography ==
- Abel, Wilhelm (1934). "Bevölkerungsgang u. Landwirtschaft im ausgehenden Mittealter im Lichte der Preis- u. Lohnbewegung" [Population and Agriculture in the late Middle Ages in the light of price and wage fluctuations]. Schmollers Jahrbuch für Gesetzgebung, Verwaltung und Volkswirtschaft im Deutschen Reiche (in German). Berlin: Duncker & Humblot. pp. 33–43. OCLC 224602624.
- Bloch, Marc; Dauvergne, Robert Marie (1960) [1st pub. Oslo 1931]. Les caractères originaux de l'histoire rurale française (in French). Armand Colin. OCLC 925568328.
- Merrill, Robert (1987). Sir Thomas Malory and the Cultural Crisis of the Late Middle Ages. American University Studies. Series 4. New York: Peter Lang Publishing. ISBN 978-0-8204-0303-8.
- Merton, Thomas (29 November 1999). Mystics and Zen Masters. New York: Farrar, Straus and Giroux. p. 188. ISBN 978-1-4299-4400-7. OCLC 643880738.
- Phythian-Adams, Charles (27 June 2002) [1st pub. 1979]. Desolation of a City: Coventry and the Urban Crisis of the Late Middle Ages. Past and present publications. Cambridge University Press. ISBN 978-0-521-52500-8. OCLC 49784573.
- Pirenne, Henri (1969) [1st pub. 1933 in Gustave Glotz, ed., Histoire général, vol. 3, Histoire du Moyen-Age (Paris)]. Histoire Économique Et Sociale Du Moyen Âge (in French). Paris: Presses Univ. de France. OCLC 1024502195.
- Postan, Michael M. (1939). "Revisions in Economic History: IX.-The Fifteenth Century". Economic History Review. 9 (2): 160–167. doi:10.2307/2590221. JSTOR 2590221.
- James L. Goldsmith (1995). "The Crises of the Late Middle Ages: The Case of France". French History. 9 (4): 417–50. doi:10.1093/fh/9.4.417.
- Borst, Arno (1992). Medieval Worlds: Barbarians, Heretics and Artists in the Middle Ages. University of Chicago Press. p. 167. ISBN 978-0-226-06656-1.
- Institut d'Estudis Catalans (2013). Crisis frumentàries, iniciatives privades i polítiques públiques de proveïment a les ciutats catalanes durant la baixa edat mitjana: Coordinació a cura d'Antoni Riera i Melis [Crises in grain production, private initiatives and public supply policies to Catalan cities during the Late Middle Ages: Coordination under the care of Antoni Riera i Melis]. Barcelona: Institut d'Estudis Catalans. p. 13. ISBN 978-84-9965-180-4. OCLC 870100518.
