= Great Bovine Pestilence =

14th century bovine disease outbreak in England and Wales

The Great Bovine Pestilence was an epizootic infectious disease outbreak in England and Wales, peaking in 1319–20, and responsible for the death of nearly two-thirds of all bovine animals in the country. The outbreak caused significant drops in the availability of beef and dairy, but also impacted arable production due to the reliance of farms on oxen for ploughing.

It is also referred to as the Great Cattle Pestilence or simply the Cattle Pestilence.

== Description ==
The pestilence was an outbreak of a pathogen, starting in 1318 and peaking in 1319–20, which resulted in the death of an estimated 62% of the bovine stock of England and Wales.

The outbreak came soon after the Great Famine of 1315–1317 where crop yields had plummeted, and this led to a situation where livestock were likely to be malnourished and prone to infection.

== Pathogen ==
The sources describe almost all bovines affected by the disease dying from it (~100% mortality), and onset to death being quick, but that not all animals in some herds would be (seemingly) infected.

Some sources indicate that the outbreak was likely to be rinderpest, but other suggestions have included anthrax, foot-and-mouth disease, and contagious bovine pleuropneumonia.

== Impact ==
The outbreak caused a serious drop in protein availability, with a fall not only in bovine meat, but in milk and dairy products. There was also a drop in arable output due to the widespread use of oxen for ploughing at this time.

The fall in availability of oxen seems to have hastened a switch to draft horses to undertake agricultural tasks, meaning that yields per-acre did not drop as much as might have been expected given the loss of draft animals.
