= Popular revolts in late medieval Europe =

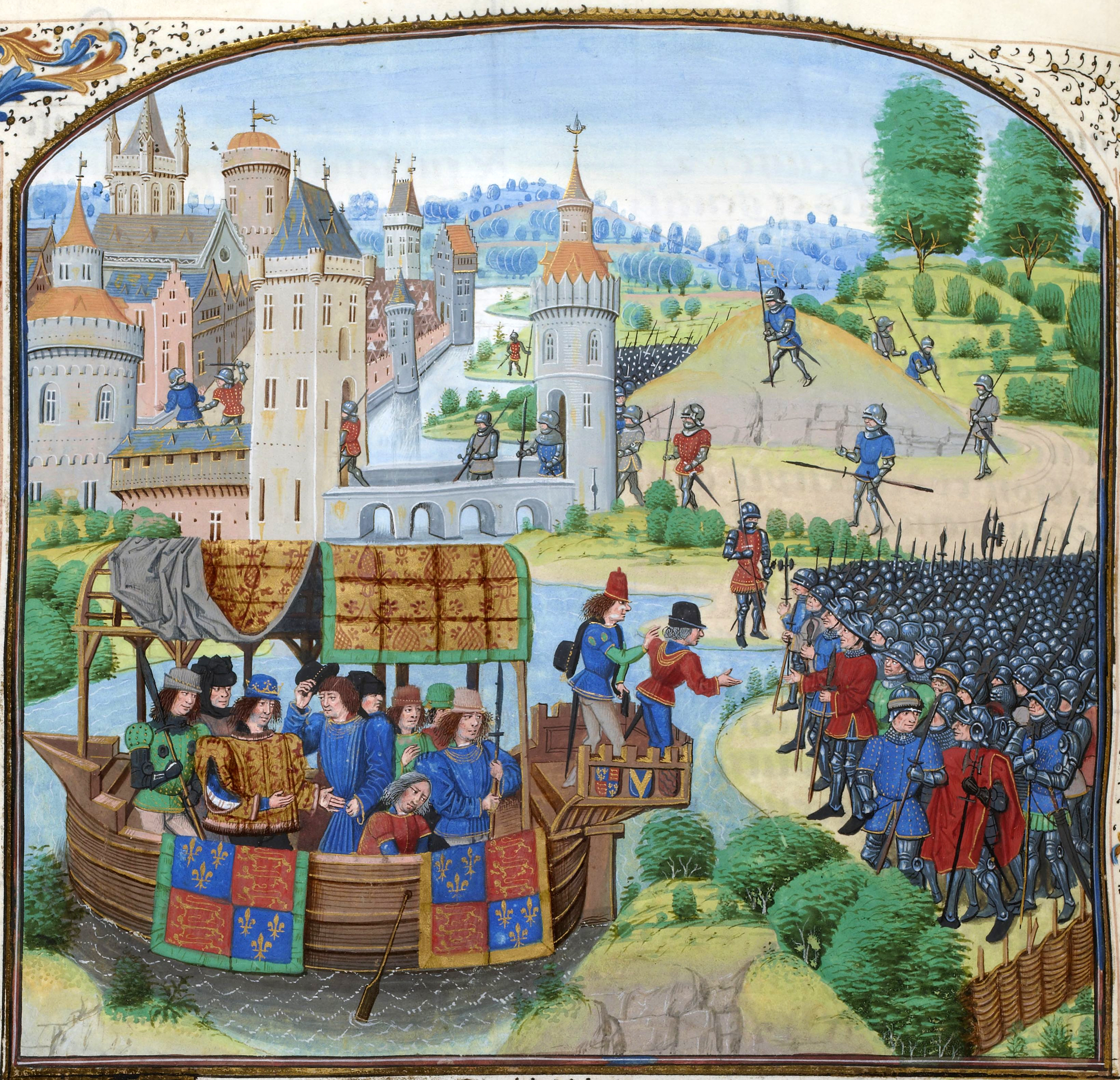
Richard II of England meets the rebels of the Peasants' Revolt

Medieval Europe saw uprisings and rebellions by peasants in the countryside, or the burgesses in towns, against nobles, abbots and kings during the upheavals between 1300 and 1500, part of a larger crisis of the Late Middle Ages. Although sometimes known as 'peasant revolts', the phenomenon of popular uprisings was of broad scope and not just restricted to peasants. In Central Europe and the Balkan region, these rebellions expressed, and helped cause, a political and social disunity paving the way for the expansion of the Ottoman Empire.

== Background ==
Before the 14th century, popular uprisings (such as uprisings at a manor house against an unpleasant overlord), though not unknown, tended to operate on a local scale. This changed in the 14th and 15th centuries when new downward pressures on the poor resulted in mass movements of popular uprisings across Europe. For example, Germany between 1336 and 1525 witnessed no fewer than sixty instances of militant peasant unrest.

Most of the revolts expressed the desire of those below to share in the wealth, status, and well-being of those more fortunate. In the end, they were almost always defeated by the nobles. A new attitude emerged in Europe, that "peasant" was a pejorative concept, it was something separate, and seen in a negative light, from those who had wealth and status. This was an entirely new social stratification from earlier times when society had been based on the three orders, those who work, those who pray, and those who fight, when being a peasant meant being next to God, just like the other orders.

== Causes ==
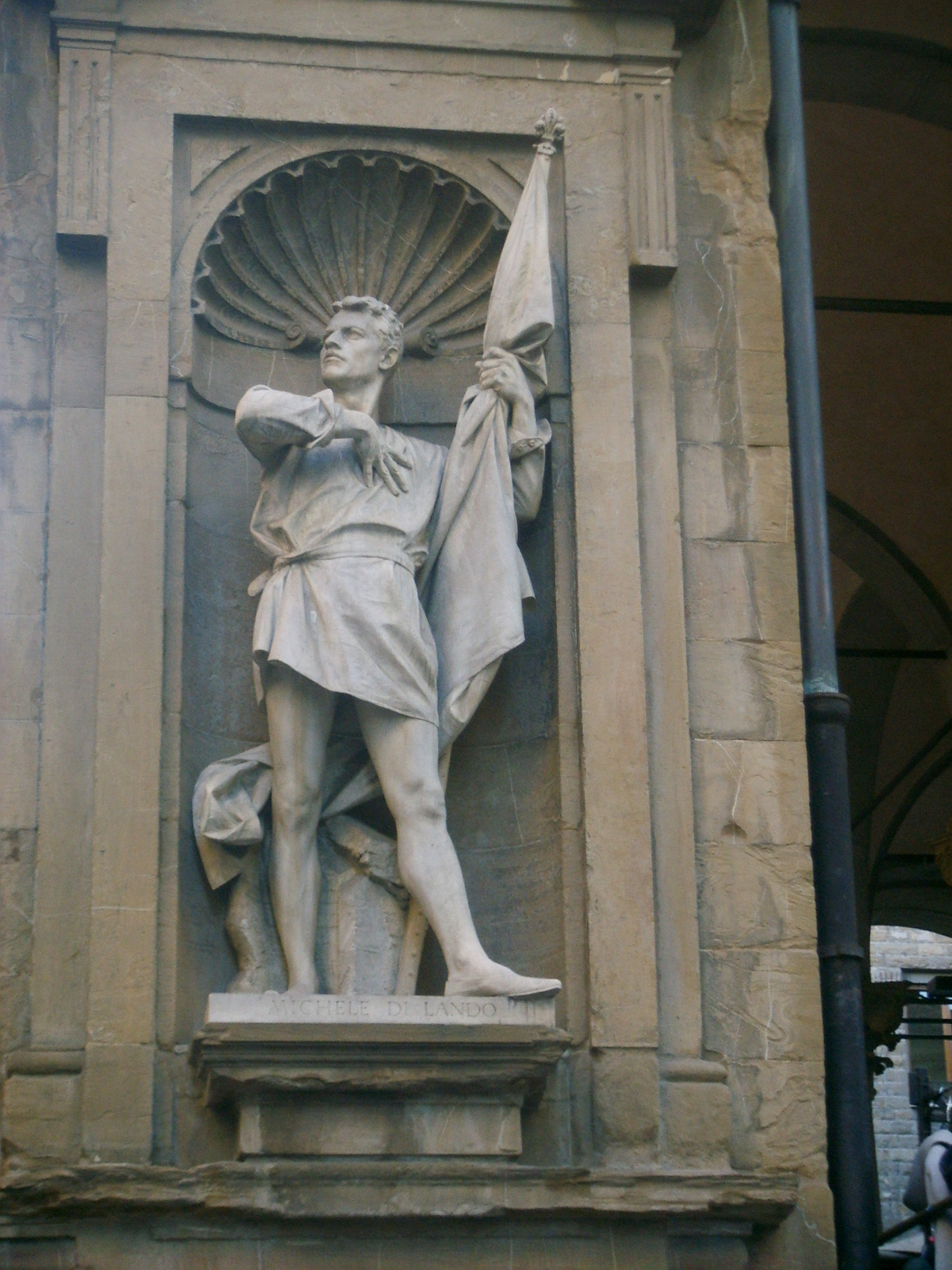
Michele di Lando, placed in the office of gonfaloniere of Florence by the revolt of the Guild-less Ciompi

The main reasons cited for these mass uprisings are: an increasing gap between the wealthy and poor, declining incomes of the poor, rising inflation, taxation, the external crises of famine, plague, war, and religious conflict.

The social gap between rich and poor had become more extreme, the origins of this change can be traced to the 12th century and the rise of the concept of nobility. Dress, behaviour, courtesy, speech, diet, education – all became part of the noble class, making them distinct from others. By the 14th century the nobles had indeed become very different in their behaviour, appearance and values from those "beneath".

The nobles however also faced a crisis of declining income. By 1285 inflation had become rampant (in part due to population pressures) and some nobles charged rent based on customary fixed rates, based on the feudal system, so as the price of goods and services rose from inflation, the income of those nobles remained stagnant, effectively dropping. To make matters worse, the nobles had become accustomed to a more luxurious lifestyle that required more money. To address this, nobles illegally raised rents, cheated, stole, and sometimes resorted to outright violence to maintain this lifestyle.

Kings who needed money to finance wars resorted to devaluing currency by cutting silver and gold coins with less precious metal, which resulted in increased inflation and, in the end, increased tax rates.

The 14th century crises of famine, plague, and war put additional pressures on those at the bottom. The plague in particular drastically reduced the numbers of people who were workers and producing the wealth.

Finally, layered on top of this was a popular ideological view of the time that property, wealth and inequality were against the teachings of God, as expressed through the teachings of the Franciscans. The sentiment of the time was probably best expressed by preacher John Ball during the English Peasant Revolt when he said, "When Adam delved and Eve span, who was then the gentleman?", criticizing economic inequality as human-made rather than a creation of God.

== Notable rural revolts ==
- The 1323–1328 Flemish revolt. Beginning as a series of scattered rural riots in late 1323, peasant insurrection escalated into a full-scale rebellion that dominated public affairs in Flanders for nearly five years.
- The Saint George's Night Uprising of 1343–1345 in Estonia.
- Battle of Warns, 1345
- The Jacquerie was a peasant revolt that took place in northern France in 1356–1358, during the Hundred Years' War.
- The Tuchin revolt 1378–1384
- The English Peasants' Revolt or Great Rising of 1381 is a major event in the history of England. It is the best documented among the revolts of this period.
- 1401–1409 Samogitian uprisings
- 1419–1434 Hussite Wars
- The Irmandiño revolts in Galicia in 1431 and 1467.
- The Engelbrekt rebellion of 1434–1436 in Sweden.
- 1437–1438 Transylvanian peasant revolt
- Jack Cade's Rebellion of 1450 led by Jack Cade.
- The Morea revolt of 1453–1454
- The War of the Remences in Old Catalonia in 1462–1486.
- 1478 Carinthian Peasant Revolt
- The Cornish Rebellion of 1497.
- 1500 Battle of Hemmingstedt in Dithmarschen
- The 1514 Rebellion of György Dózsa
- The German Peasants' War of 1525
- The Peasant's uprising of 1573 in parts of Croatia and Slovenia

== Notable urban revolts ==
- The Matins of Bruges in 1301
- The Zealots of Thessalonica, Byzantine Empire, 1342–1350.
- The revolt of Cola di Rienzo in central Italy in 1347.
- The Ciompi Revolt in 1378 in Florence.
- The Harelle in Rouen and Paris in 1382.
- The Hvar rebellion on the Dalmatian island of Hvar, Republic of Venice, 1510–1514.

== Terminology ==
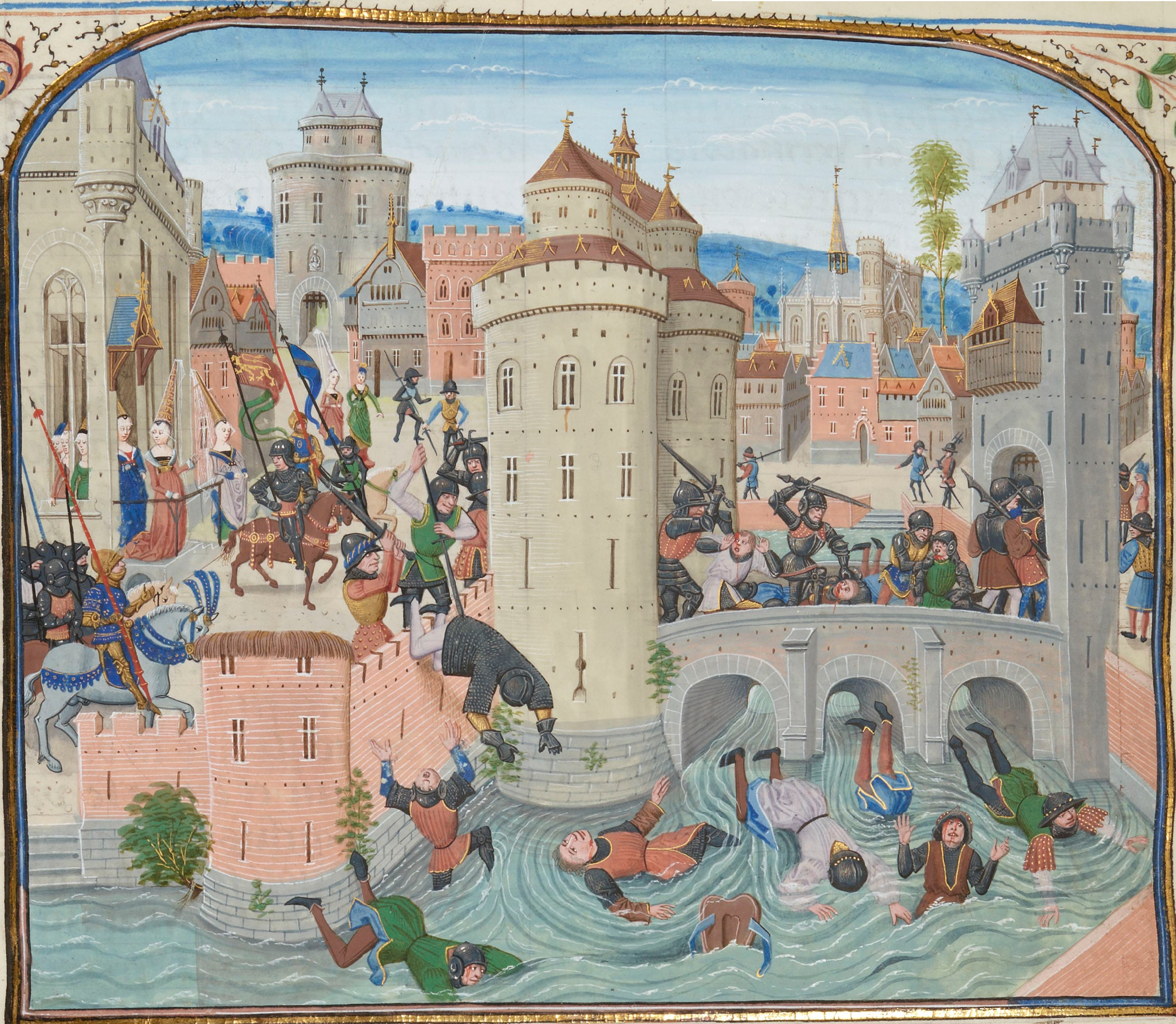
Defeat of the Jacquerie

Different historians will use different terms to describe these events. The word peasant, since the 14th century, has had a pejorative meaning. However, it was not always that way; peasants were once viewed as pious and seen with respect and pride. As nobles increasingly lived better quality lives, there arose a new consciousness of those on top and those below, and the sense that being a peasant was not a position of equality. This new consciousness coincided with the popular uprisings of the 14th century.

Research by Rodney Hilton in the 1970s showed that the Peasants' Revolt (or Great Rising) was led not by peasants, but by those who would be the most affected by increased taxation: the merchants who were not wealthy, but not poor either. Indeed, these revolts were often accompanied by landless knights, excommunicated clerics and other members of society who might find gain or have reason to rebel. Although these were popular revolts, they were often organized and led by people who would not have considered themselves peasants.

Peasants is typically a term used to denote the rural agrarian poor, while many uprisings involved tradesmen and occurred within towns and cities, thus the term does not fully encompass events as a whole for the period.

For historical writing purposes, many modern historians will use the word peasant with care and respect, choosing other phrases such as "Popular" or "from below" or "grassroots", although in some countries in central and eastern Europe where serfdom continued up to the 19th century in places, the word peasant is still used by some historians as the main description of these events.

== See also ==
- List of peasant revolts
