= Tabor, Tabor =

Locality of Slovenia

Tabor
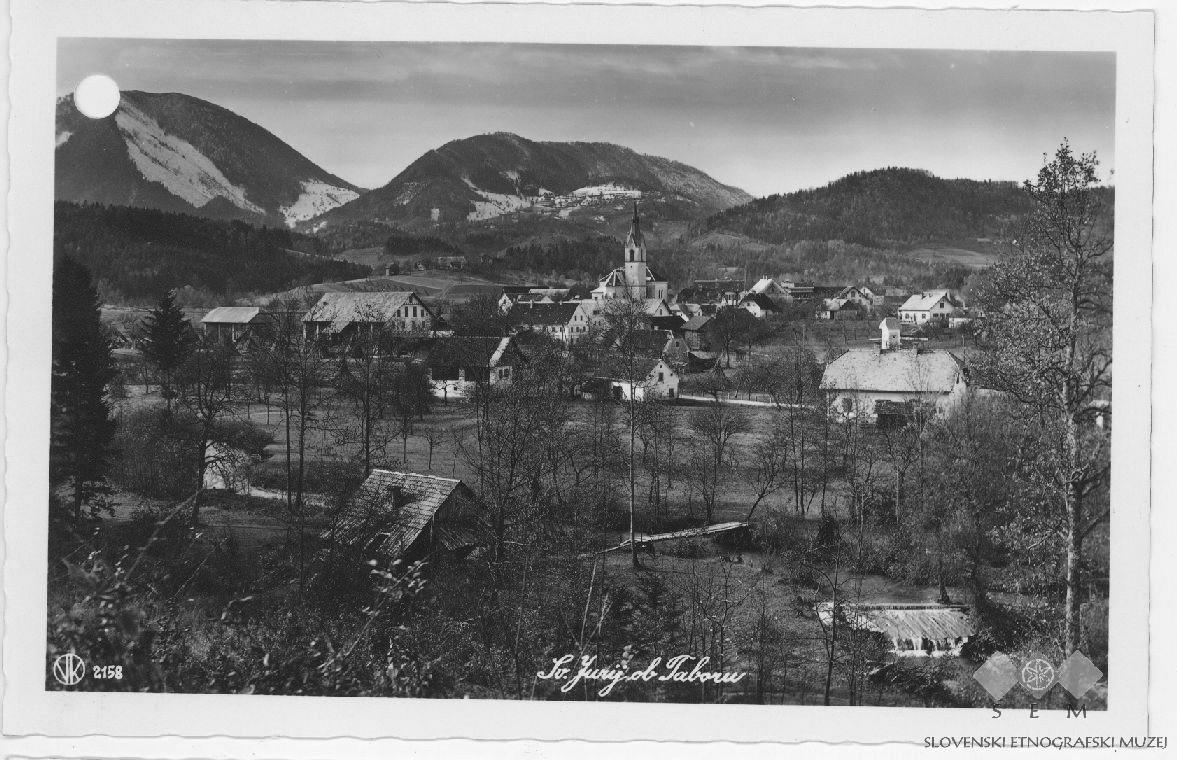
- Postcard of Tabor

- Location in Slovenia
- Coordinates: 46°12′39″N 15°0′17″E
- Country: Slovenia
- Traditional region: Styria
- Statistical region: Savinja
- Municipality: Tabor

Area
  - Total: 2.36 km^{2} (0.91 sq mi)
- Elevation: 323.2 m (1,060 ft)

Population (2023)
  - Total: 557

Tabor (pronounced [ˈtaːbɔɾ]) is a settlement in the Municipality of Tabor in central Slovenia. It lies on the edge of the Lower Savinja Valley at the northern edge of the Sava Hills. The area is part of the traditional region of Styria. It is now included in the Savinja Statistical Region.

== Church ==
The parish church in the settlement is dedicated to Saint George and belongs to the Roman Catholic Diocese of Celje. It was first mentioned in written documents dating to 1391. The original Gothic sanctuary was preserved when a new nave was built in 1900.

== Notable people ==
Notable people that were born or lived in Tabor include:

- Angelos Baš (1926–2008), ethnologist
