= Pakistan =

Country in South Asia

Islamic Republic of Pakistan: اسلامی جمہوریہ پاكستان (Urdu); Islāmī Jumhūriyah Pākistān
- Flag State emblem
- Motto: Īmān, Ittihād, Nazam (Urdu); ایمان، اتحاد، نظم; "Faith, Unity, Discipline"
- Anthem: Qaumī Tarānah (Urdu); قَومی ترانہ; "The National Anthem"
- Territory controlled by Pakistan Territory claimed but not controlled (Kashmir, Junagadh, and Sir Creek)
- Capital: Islamabad; 33°41′30″N 73°3′0″E
- Largest city: Karachi; 24°51′36″N 67°0′36″E
- Official languages: Urdu; English (Note: Article 251 of the Constitution of Pakistan)
- Native languages: Over 77 languages
- Religion (2023): 96.3% Islam (official) (Note: The Constitution designates Islam as the state religion.); 2.2% Hinduism; 1.4% Christianity; 0.1% other
- Demonym: Pakistani
- Government: Federal parliamentary Islamic republic
  - President: Asif Ali Zardari
  - Prime Minister: Shehbaz Sharif
- Legislature: Parliament
  - Upper house: Senate
  - Lower house: National Assembly

Independence from the United Kingdom
  - Declaration: 23 March 1940
  - Recognised dominion: 14 August 1947
  - Republic: 23 March 1956
  - Last territory's acquisition: 8 December 1958
  - Eastern territory withdrawn: 16 December 1971
  - Current constitution: 14 August 1973

Area
  - Total: 881,913 km^{2} (340,509 sq mi) (Note: "Includes data for Pakistani territories of Kashmir; Azad Kashmir (13,297 km^{2} or 5,134 sq mi) and Gilgit–Baltistan (72,520 km^{2} or 28,000 sq mi). Excluding these territories would produce an area figure of 796,095 km^{2} (307,374 sq mi).") (33rd)
  - Water (%): 2.86

Population
  - 2023 census: ▲241,499,431 (Note: "This figure does not include data for Pakistan-administered areas of Kashmir; Azad Kashmir and Gilgit-Baltistan, which, according to 2017 Pakistani census, had a population of 4,045,367 and 1,492,924 respectively.") (5th)
  - Density: 273.8/km^{2} (709.1/sq mi) (56th)
- GDP (PPP): 2026 estimate
  - Total: ▲$1.81 trillion (26th)
  - Per capita: ▲$7,370 (150th)
- GDP (nominal): 2026 estimate
  - Total: ▲$450.13 billion (42nd)
  - Per capita: ▲$1,840 (162nd)
- Gini (2018): ▼29.6 low inequality
- HDI (2023): ▲0.544 low (168th)
- Currency: Pakistani rupee (₨) (PKR)
- Time zone: UTC+5 (PKT)
- Date format: dd-mm-yyyy (Note: See Date and time notation in Pakistan.)
- Calling code: +92
- ISO 3166 code: PK
- Internet TLD: .pk; پاکستان.
- Website www.pakistan.gov.pk

Pakistan, (Note: Urdu: پَاکِسْتَان, Urdu pronunciation: [ˈpɑːkɪstɑːn]; Pronounced variably in English as /ˈpækɪstæn/, /ˈpɑːkɪstɑːn/, /ˌpækɪˈstæn/, and /ˌpɑːkɪˈstɑːn/.) officially the Islamic Republic of Pakistan, (Note: ISO: اِسْلامی جُمْہُورِیَہ پَاکِسْتَان, Islāmi Jumhūriyāh Pākistān) is a country in South Asia. It is the fifth-most populous country, with a population of over 241.5 million, having the second-largest Muslim population in the world as of 2023. Islamabad is the nation's capital, while Karachi is its largest city and financial centre. Pakistan is the 33rd-largest country by area. Bounded by the Arabian Sea on the south, the Gulf of Oman on the southwest, and the Sir Creek on the southeast, it shares land borders with India to the east; Afghanistan to the west; Iran to the southwest; and China to the northeast. It shares a maritime border with Oman in the Gulf of Oman, and is separated from Tajikistan in the northwest by Afghanistan's narrow Wakhan Corridor.

Pakistan is the site of several ancient cultures, including the 8,500-year-old Neolithic site of Mehrgarh in Balochistan, the Indus Valley Civilisation of the Bronze Age, and the ancient Gandhara civilisation. The regions that compose the modern state of Pakistan were the realm of multiple empires and dynasties, including the Achaemenid, the Maurya, the Kushan, the Gupta; the Umayyad Caliphate in its southern regions, the Hindu Shahis, the Ghaznavids, the Delhi Sultanate, the Samma, the Shah Miris, the Mughals, and finally, the British Raj from 1858 to 1947.

Spurred by the Pakistan Movement, which sought a homeland for the Muslims of British India, and election victories in 1946 by the All-India Muslim League, Pakistan gained independence in 1947 after the partition of British India, which awarded separate statehood to its Muslim-majority regions and was accompanied by an unparalleled mass migration and loss of life. Initially a dominion of the British Commonwealth, Pakistan adopted a republican constitution in 1956 and became an Islamic republic with two geographically separate provinces, East Pakistan and West Pakistan. East Pakistan seceded as the new country of Bangladesh in 1971 after a nine-month-long civil war. In the following four decades, Pakistan has been ruled by governments that alternated between civilian and military, democratic and authoritarian, relatively secular and Islamist.

Pakistan is considered a middle power and is a declared nuclear-weapon state, with the world's seventh-largest standing armed forces. The Pakistani economy is ranked amongst the world's emerging and growth-leading economies, with a large and rapidly growing middle class. Pakistan's political history since independence has been characterised by periods of significant economic and military growth as well as those of political and economic instability. It is an ethnically and linguistically diverse country, with similarly diverse geography and wildlife. The country continues to face poverty, illiteracy, corruption, and terrorism. Pakistan is a member of the United Nations, the Shanghai Cooperation Organisation, the Organisation of Islamic Cooperation, the Commonwealth of Nations, the South Asian Association for Regional Cooperation, and the Islamic Military Counter-Terrorism Coalition, and is designated as a major non-NATO ally by the United States.

== Etymology ==
The name Pakistan was coined by Choudhry Rahmat Ali, a Pakistan Movement activist, who in January 1933 first published it (originally as "Pakstan") in a pamphlet Now or Never, using it as an acronym. Rahmat Ali explained: "It is composed of letters taken from the names of all our homelands, Indian and Asian, Panjab, Afghania, Kashmir, Sindh, and Baluchistan." He added, "Pakistan is both a Persian and Urdu word... It means the land of the Paks, the spiritually pure and clean." Etymologists note that پاک pāk, is 'pure' in Persian and Pashto and the Persian suffix ـستان -stan means 'land' or 'place of'.

Rahmat Ali's concept of Pakistan only related to the northwestern area of the Indian subcontinent. He also proposed the name "Banglastan" for the Muslim areas of Bengal and "Osmanistan" for Hyderabad State, as well as a political federation between the three.

== History ==
=== Prehistory and antiquity ===
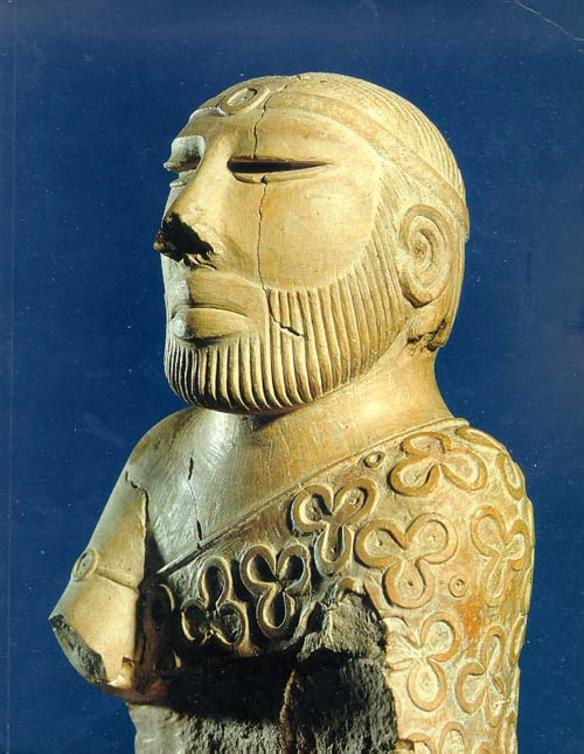
Priest-King from Mohenjo-daro (c. 2500 BCE)

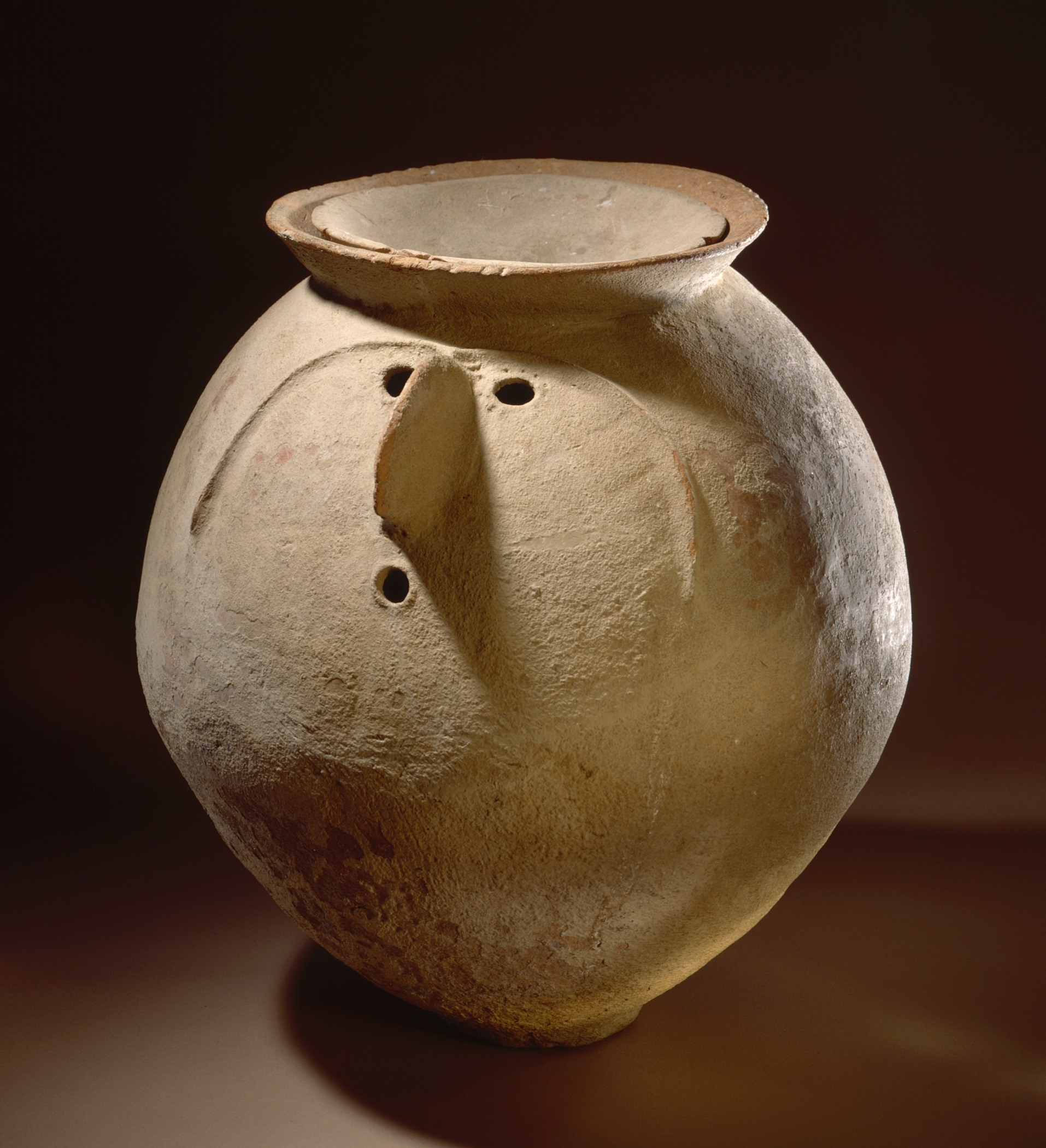
Cremation urn, Gandhara grave culture, Swat Valley (c. 1200 BCE)

Some of the earliest ancient human civilisations in South Asia originated from areas encompassing contemporary Pakistan. The earliest known stone tools in the region, dating to the Lower Palaeolithic (~2 million years ago), were discovered in the Soan Valley of northern Pakistan. The Indus plain region, which covers most of the present-day Pakistan, was the site of several successive ancient cultures including the Neolithic (7000–4300 BCE) site of Mehrgarh, and the 5,000-year history of urban life in South Asia to the various sites of the Indus Valley Civilisation, including Mohenjo-daro and Harappa.

Following the decline of the Indus Valley Civilisation, semi-nomadic Indo-European Aryans migrated into the Indian subcontinent around 2000 BCE, perhaps by way of the Khyber Pass. They fused with the indigenous Harappan culture of the Indus Valley, and elements of the pre-Aryan spiritual traditions were assimilated into the developing Vedic tradition. This cultural milieu shaped the Gandhara Civilisation, which flourished at the crossroads of India, Central Asia, and the Middle East, connecting trade routes and absorbing cultural influences from diverse civilisations. By the early Vedic period, parts of the Indus region in present-day Pakistan were populated by numerous tribes that were beginning to coalesce into chieftain-led clans and early kingdoms.

=== Classical period ===
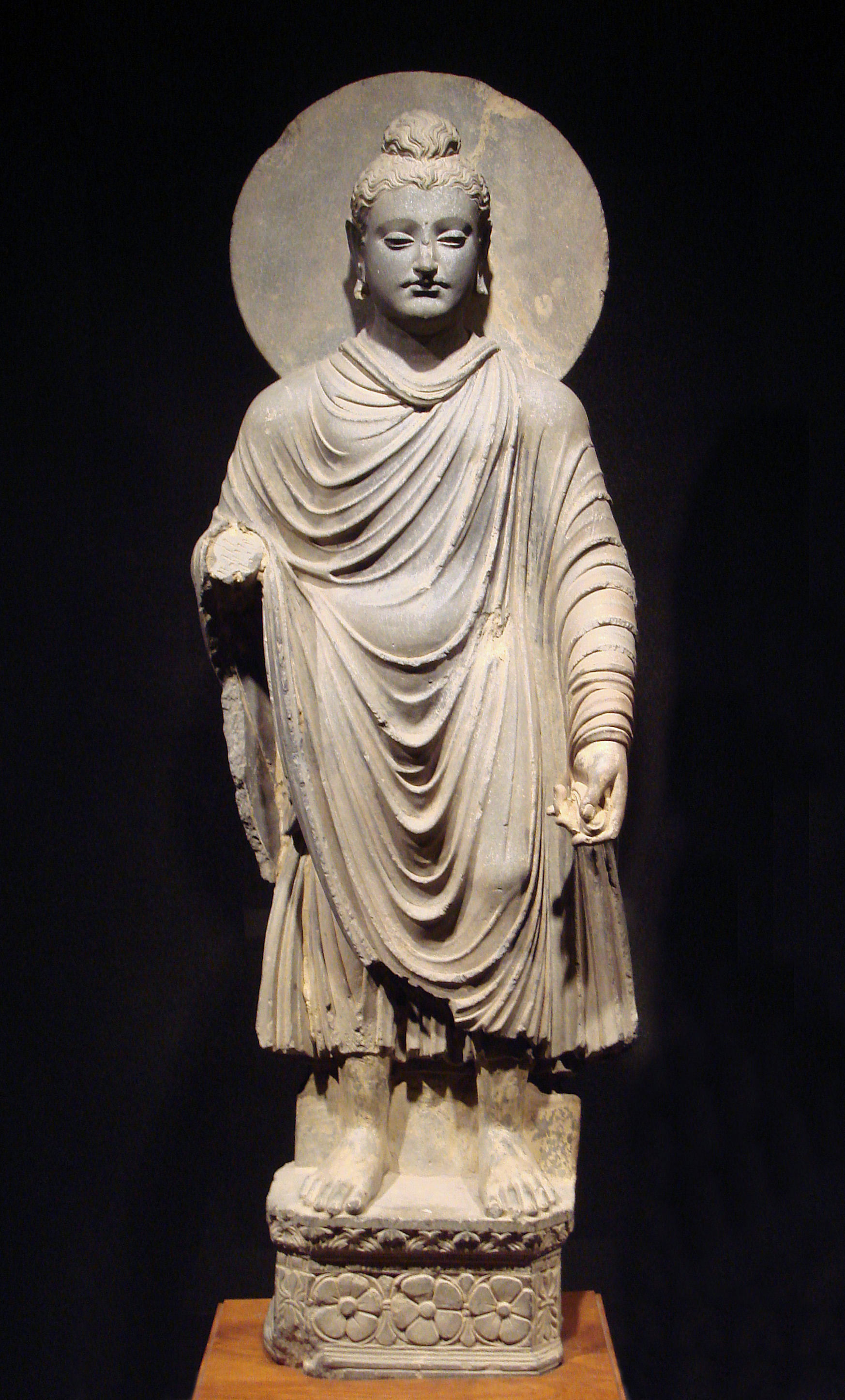
Standing Buddha from Gandhara (1st–2nd century CE)

The western regions of Pakistan became a part of the Achaemenid Empire around 517 BCE. In 326 BCE, Alexander the Great conquered the region by defeating various local rulers, most notably, King Porus, at Jhelum. The Mauryas ruled from 322 BCE to 185 BCE, during which Ashoka introduced Buddhism to the region. The Indo-Greek Kingdom founded by Demetrius of Bactria (180–165 BCE) included Gandhara and Punjab and reached its greatest extent under Menander (165–150 BCE), under whom the Greco-Buddhist culture flourished in the region. Taxila had one of the earliest universities and centres of higher education in the world, which was established during the late Vedic period in the 6th century BCE. University of ancient Taxila was documented by the invading forces of Alexander the Great and recorded by Chinese pilgrims in the 4th or 5th century CE. (Note: Needham (1994) "When the men of Alexander the Great came to Taxila in India in the fourth century BCE they found a university there the like of which had not been seen in Greece, a university which taught the three Vedas and the eighteen accomplishments and was still existing when the Chinese pilgrim Fa-Hsien went there about CE 400.") (Note: Kulke & Rothermund (2016) "In the early centuries the centre of Buddhist scholarship was the University of Taxila.") At its zenith, the Rai dynasty (489–632 CE) ruled Sindh and the surrounding territories.

=== Medieval period ===
Makran came under Muslim rule in the 7th century CE when it was conquered and a garrison was established under Mu'awiya I (r. 661–680). The Arab general Muhammad ibn Qasim conquered Sindh and some regions of Punjab in 711 CE. The Pakistani government's official chronology claims this as the time when the foundation of Pakistan was laid. The early medieval period (642–1219 CE) witnessed the spread of Islam in the region. Before the arrival of Islam beginning in the 8th century, the region of Pakistan was home to a diverse plethora of faiths, including Hinduism, Buddhism, Jainism and Zoroastrianism. During this period, Sufi missionaries played a pivotal role in converting a majority of the regional population to Islam. Upon the defeat of the Turk and Hindu Shahi dynasties which governed the Kabul Valley, Gandhara, and western Punjab in the 7th to 11th centuries CE, several successive Muslim empires ruled over the region, including the Ghaznavid Empire (975–1187 CE), the Ghorid Empire, and the Delhi Sultanate (1206–1526 CE). The Lodi dynasty, the last of the Delhi Sultanate, was replaced by the Mughal Empire (1526–1857 CE).

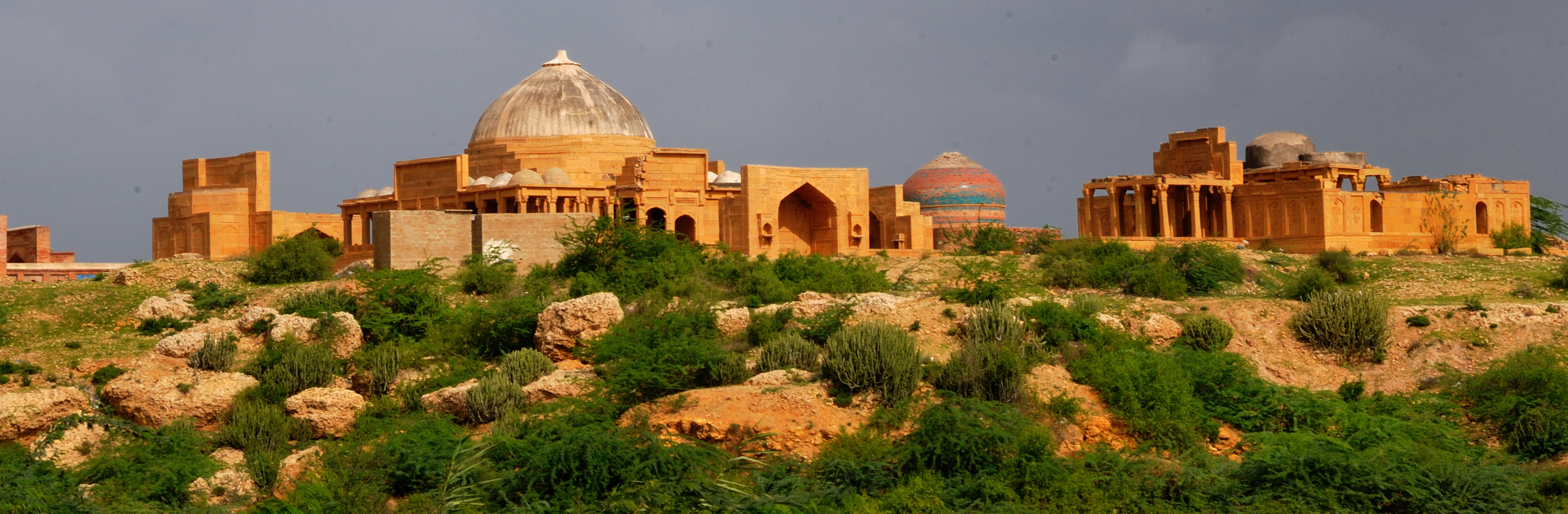
Makli Necropolis, a UNESCO World Heritage Site, rose to prominence as a major funerary site during the Samma dynasty.

From the early 16th century onwards, the region of modern-day Pakistan remained under the Mughal Empire. Key urban centres during the Mughal period in the region were Multan, Lahore, Peshawar and Thatta, which were chosen as the site of impressive Mughal monuments. In the 18th century, the slow disintegration of the Mughal Empire was hastened by the emergence of the rival powers like the Maratha Empire and later the Sikh Empire, as well as invasions by Nader Shah from Iran in 1739, and the Durrani Empire of Afghanistan in 1748. The growing political power of the British in Bengal had not yet reached the territories of modern Pakistan.

=== Colonial rule ===
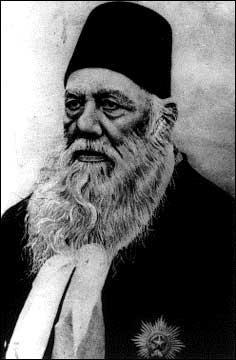
Sir Syed Ahmad Khan (1817–1898), whose vision formed the basis of Pakistan

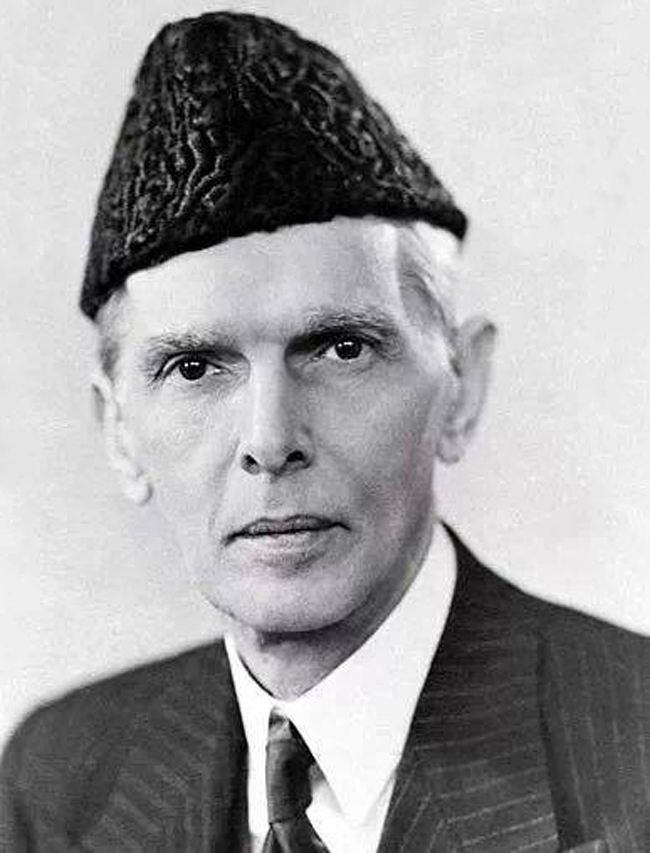
Muhammad Ali Jinnah (1876–1948), Pakistan's first Governor-General and the leader of the Pakistan Movement

No part of modern Pakistan was under British rule until 1839 when Karachi, a small fishing village governed by Talpurs of Sindh with a mud fort guarding the harbour, was taken, and used as an enclave with a port and military base for the First Afghan War that ensued. The remainder of Sindh was annexed in 1843, and subsequently, through a series of wars and treaties, the East India Company, and later, after the Sepoy Mutiny (1857–1858), direct rule by Queen Victoria of the British Empire, conquered most of the region. Key conflicts included those against the Baloch Talpur dynasty, concluding in the Battle of Miani (1843) in Sindh, the Anglo-Sikh Wars (1845–1849), and the Anglo-Afghan Wars (1839–1919). By 1893, modern Pakistan was part of the British Indian Empire, and remained so until independence in 1947.

An important uprising against the British in the region was the Indian Rebellion of 1857, known at the time as the Sepoy Mutiny. Divergence in the relationship between Hinduism and Islam resulted in significant tension in British India, leading to religious violence. The language controversy further exacerbated tensions between Hindus and Muslims. A Muslim intellectual movement, led by Sir Syed Ahmed Khan to counter the Hindu renaissance, advocated for the two-nation theory and led to the establishment of the All-India Muslim League in 1906.

In March 1929, in response to the Nehru Report, Muhammad Ali Jinnah, the founder of Pakistan, issued his fourteen points, which included proposals to safeguard the interests of the Muslim minority in a united India. These proposals were rejected. In his 29 December 1930 address, Allama Iqbal advocated the amalgamation of Muslim-majority states in North-West India, including Punjab, North-West Frontier Province, Sind, and Baluchistan. (Note: Iqbal (two-nation theory): multiple sources: N. Khan (2012); Basu & Miroshnik (2023) "Mohammed Iqbal was credited with coming up with the two-nation theory in his speech at Allahabad in 1930 to the Muslim League in a very formal way by saying: "I would like to see the Punjab, North-West Frontier Province, Sind, and Baluchistan amalgamated into a single State. Self-government within the British Empire or without the British Empire, the formation of a consolidated North-West Indian Moslem State appears to me to be the final destiny of the Moslems, at least of NorthWest India" (Zaidi, 1993; Ahmed, 1970)."; Hussain (2018) "After repeated demands for stronger constitutional safeguards to protect the rights of minorities, Iqbal eventually opted for a separate Islamic Republic instead. As opposed to putting the free and rational individual at the centre of his democratic theory, Iqbal's republic primarily required Muslims endowed with a specific character and smelted together by a peculiar vision of individuality. Like a number of his contemporaries, Iqbal warmed up to the two nation-theory. Unlike the mainstream view, however, which read an eternal struggle of Hindus and Muslims back into Indian history, Iqbal's concept of the Muslim nation was something to be striven towards, not something to be replanted from the past. Iqbal believed that the best way to actualize this national sentiment in the present, was through individual political action.") The perception that Congress-led British provincial governments neglected the Muslim League from 1937 to 1939 motivated Jinnah and other Muslim League leaders to embrace the two-nation theory. This led to the adoption of the Lahore Resolution of 1940, presented by Sher-e-Bangla A.K. Fazlul Haque, also known as the Pakistan Resolution.

By 1942, Britain faced considerable strain during World War II, with India directly threatened by Japanese forces. Britain had pledged voluntary independence for India in exchange for support during the war. However, this pledge included a clause stating that no part of British India would be compelled to join the resulting dominion, which could be interpreted as support for an independent Muslim nation. Congress under the leadership of Mahatma Gandhi launched the Quit India Movement, demanding an immediate end to British rule. In contrast, the Muslim League chose to support the UK's war efforts, thereby nurturing the possibility of establishing a Muslim nation.

=== Independence ===
The partition of India: green regions were all part of Pakistan by 1948, and orange ones part of India. The darker-shaded regions represent the Punjab and Bengal provinces partitioned by the Radcliffe Line. The grey areas represent some of the key princely states that were eventually integrated into India or Pakistan.

The 1946 elections saw the Muslim League secure 90 percent of the Muslim seats, supported by the landowners of Sindh and Punjab. This forced the Indian National Congress, initially skeptical of the League's representation of Indian Muslims, to acknowledge its significance. Jinnah's emergence as the voice of the Indian Muslims, compelled the British to consider their stance, despite their reluctance to partition India. In a final attempt to prevent partition, they proposed the Cabinet Mission Plan.

As the Cabinet Mission failed, the British announced their intention to end rule by June 1948. Following rigorous discussions involving Viceroy of India, Lord Mountbatten of Burma, Muhammad Ali Jinnah of the All-India Muslim League, and Jawaharlal Nehru of Congress, the formal declaration to partition British India into two independent dominions—namely Pakistan and India—was issued by Mountbatten on the evening of 3 June 1947. In Mountbatten's oval office, the prime ministers of around a dozen major princely states gathered to receive their copies of the plan before its worldwide broadcast. At 7:00 p.m., All India Radio transmitted the public announcement, starting with the viceroy's address, followed by individual speeches from Nehru and Jinnah. The founder of Pakistan Muhammad Ali Jinnah concluded his address with the slogan Pakistan Zindabad (Long Live Pakistan).

As the United Kingdom agreed to the partitioning of India, the modern state of Pakistan was established on 14 August 1947. (Note: 14 August 1947 was the 27th of Ramadan in 1366 of the Islamic calendar, a holy time regarded as auspicious and noted for its religious importance.) This new nation amalgamated the Muslim-majority eastern and northwestern regions of British India, comprising the provinces of Baluchistan, East Bengal, the North-West Frontier Province, West Punjab, and Sind, as well as several semi-autonomous princely states.

In the riots that accompanied the partition in Punjab Province, between 200,000 and 2,000,000 people were killed in what some have described as a retributive genocide between the religions. (Note: Casualties/Genocide: multiple sources: Sikand (2004); Butalia (2000); Isaacs (1975) "2,000,000 killed in the Hindu-Muslim holocaust during the partition of British-India and the creation of India and Pakistan"; Basrur (2008) "An estimated 12–15 million people were displaced, and some 2 million died. The legacy of Partition (never without a capital P) remains strong today ..."; D'Costa (2011) "Estimates of the dead vary from 200,000 (the contemporary British figure) to 2 million (a subsequent Indian speculation). Today, however, it is widely accepted that nearly a million people died during Partition (Butalia, 1997)."; Brass (2003) "In the event, largely but not exclusively as a consequence of their efforts, the entire Muslim population of the eastern Punjab districts migrated to West Punjab and the entire Sikh and Hindu populations moved to East Punjab in the midst of widespread intimidation, terror, violence, abduction, rape, and murder.") Around 50,000 Muslim women were abducted and raped by Hindu and Sikh men, while 33,000 Hindu and Sikh women experienced the same fate at the hands of Muslims. (Note: Rape figures: multiple sources: Visweswaran (2011); Daiya (2011) "The official estimate of the number of abducted women during Partition was placed at 33,000 non-Muslim (Hindu or Sikh predominantly) women in Pakistan, and 50,000 Muslim women in India."; Abraham (2002) "In addition thousands of women on both sides of the newly formed borders (estimated range from 29,000 to 50,000 Muslim women and 15,000 to 35,000 Hindu and Sikh women) were abducted, raped, forced to convert, forced into marriage, forced back into what the two States defined as 'their proper homes', torn apart from their families once during partition by those who abducted them, and again, after partition, by the State which tried to 'recover' and 'rehabilitate' them."; Singh, Iyer & Gairola (2016) "The horrific statistics that surround women refugees-between 75,000–100,000 Hindu, Muslim and Sikh women who were abducted by men of the other communities, subjected to multiple rapes, mutilations, and, for some, forced marriages and conversions-is matched by the treatment of the abducted women in the hands of the nation-state. In the Constituent Assembly in 1949 it was recorded that of the 50,000 Muslim women abducted in India, 8,000 of then were recovered, and of the 33,000 Hindu and Sikh women abducted, 12,000 were recovered.") Around 6.5 million Muslims moved from India to West Pakistan and 4.7 million Hindus and Sikhs moved from West Pakistan to India. It was the largest mass migration in human history. A subsequent dispute over the princely state of Jammu and Kashmir eventually sparked the Indo-Pakistani War of 1947–1948.

=== Post-independence ===
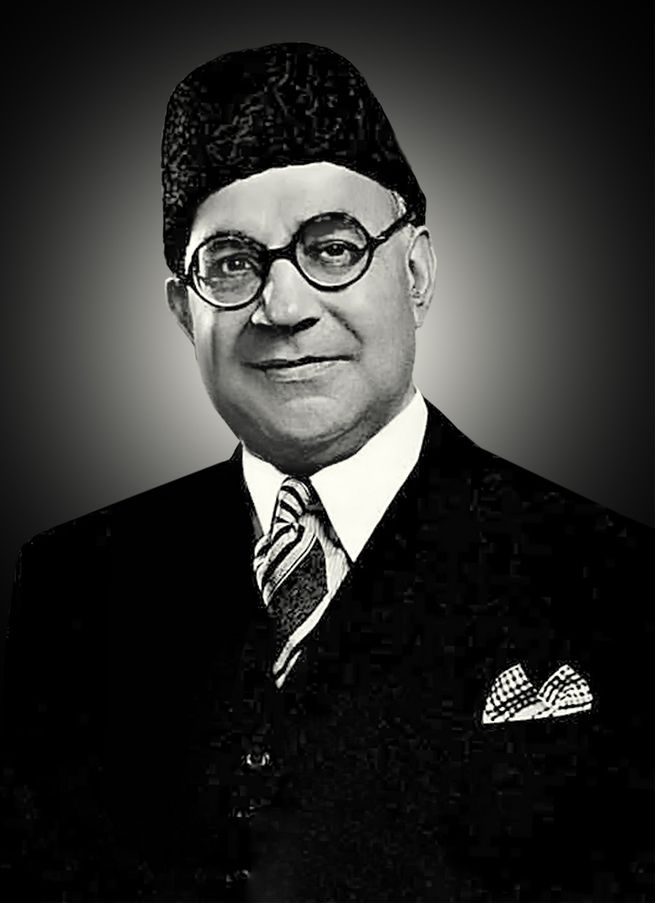
Liaquat Ali Khan was elected the first prime minister of Pakistan.

After independence in 1947, Jinnah, the president of the Muslim League, became Pakistan's first governor-general and the first President-Speaker of the Parliament, but he died of tuberculosis on 11 September 1948. Meanwhile, Pakistan's founding fathers agreed to appoint Liaquat Ali Khan, the secretary-general of the party, as the nation's first prime minister. From 1947 to 1956, Pakistan was a monarchy within the Commonwealth of Nations, and had two monarchs before it became a republic.

The creation of Pakistan was never fully accepted by many British leaders, including Lord Mountbatten. Mountbatten expressed his lack of support and faith in the Muslim League's idea of Pakistan. Jinnah refused Mountbatten's offer to serve as Governor-General of Pakistan. When Mountbatten was asked by Collins and Lapierre if he would have sabotaged Pakistan had he known that Jinnah was dying of tuberculosis, he replied 'most probably'.

The American CIA film on Pakistan, made in 1950, examines the history and geography of Pakistan.

"You are free; you are free to go to your temples, you are free to go to your mosques or to any other place of worship in this State of Pakistan. You may belong to any religion or caste or creed – that has nothing to do with the business of the State."

— Muhammad Ali Jinnah's first speech to the Constituent Assembly of Pakistan.

Maulana Shabbir Ahmad Usmani, a respected Deobandi alim (scholar) who held the position of Shaykh al-Islam in Pakistan in 1949, and Maulana Mawdudi of Jamaat-i-Islami played key roles in advocating for an Islamic constitution. Mawdudi insisted that the Constituent Assembly declare the "supreme sovereignty of God" and the supremacy of the shariah in Pakistan.

The efforts of Jamaat-i-Islami and the ulama led to the passage of the Objectives Resolution in March 1949. This resolution, described by Liaquat Ali Khan as the second most significant step in Pakistan's history, affirmed that "sovereignty over the entire universe belongs to God Almighty alone and the authority which He has delegated to the State of Pakistan through its people for being exercised within the limits prescribed by Him is a sacred trust". It was later included as a preamble to the constitutions of 1956, 1962, and 1973.

Democracy faced setbacks due to the martial law imposed by President Iskander Mirza, who was succeeded by General Ayub Khan. After adopting a presidential system in 1962, Pakistan witnessed significant growth until the second war with India in 1965, resulting in an economic downturn and widespread public discontent in 1967. In 1969, President Yahya Khan consolidated control, but the following year, East Pakistan was struck by the devastating Bhola cyclone, which resulted in 500,000 deaths.

In 1970, Pakistan conducted its first democratic elections since independence, intending to transition from military rule to democracy. However, after the East Pakistani Awami League emerged victorious over the Pakistan Peoples Party (PPP), Yahya Khan and the military refused to transfer power. This led to Operation Searchlight, a military crackdown, and eventually sparked the war of liberation by Bengali Mukti Bahini forces in East Pakistan, described in West Pakistan as a civil war rather than a liberation struggle.

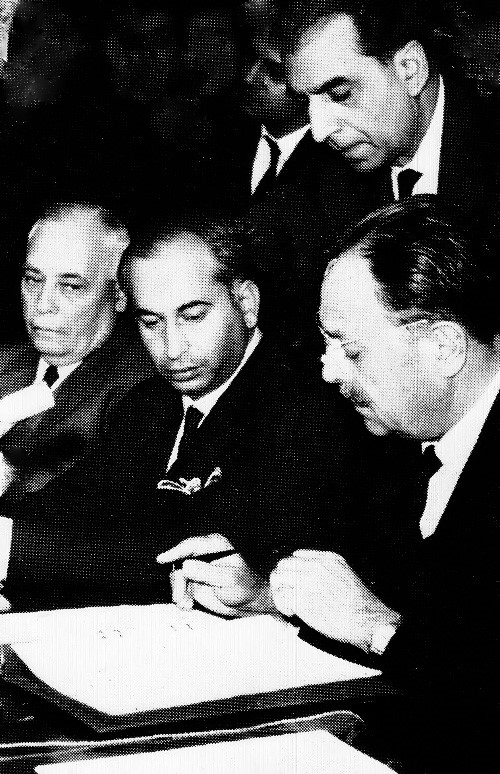
Signing of the Tashkent Declaration to end hostilities with India in 1965 in Tashkent, USSR, by President Ayub alongside Bhutto (centre) and Aziz Ahmed (left)

Independent researchers estimate that between 300,000 and 500,000 civilians died during this period while the Bangladesh government puts the number of dead at three million, a figure now nearly universally regarded as excessively inflated. Some academics such as Rudolph Rummel and Rounaq Jahan say both sides committed genocide; others such as Richard Sisson and Leo E. Rose believe there was no genocide. In response to India's support for the insurgency in East Pakistan, preemptive strikes on India by Pakistan's air force, navy, and marines sparked a conventional war in 1971 that resulted in an Indian victory and East Pakistan gaining independence as Bangladesh.

Yahya Khan was replaced by Zulfikar Ali Bhutto as president; the country worked towards promulgating its constitution and putting the country on the road to democracy. In 1972 Pakistan embarked on an ambitious plan to develop its nuclear deterrence capability with the goal of preventing any foreign invasion; the country's first nuclear power plant was inaugurated in that same year. India's first nuclear test in 1974 gave Pakistan additional justification to accelerate its nuclear program.

Democracy ended with a military coup in 1977 against the leftist PPP, which saw General Zia-ul-Haq become the president in 1978. From 1977 to 1988, President Zia's corporatisation and economic Islamisation initiatives led to Pakistan becoming one of the fastest-growing economies in South Asia. While building up the country's nuclear program, increasing Islamisation, and the rise of a homegrown conservative philosophy, Pakistan helped subsidise and distribute US resources to factions of the mujahideen against the USSR's intervention in communist Afghanistan. Pakistan's North-West Frontier Province became a base for the anti-Soviet Afghan fighters, with the province's influential Deobandi ulama playing a significant role in encouraging and organising the 'jihad'.

President Zia died in a plane crash in 1988, and Benazir Bhutto, daughter of Zulfikar Ali Bhutto, was elected as the country's first female Prime Minister. The PPP was followed by conservative Pakistan Muslim League (N) (PML (N)), and over the next decade the leaders of the two parties fought for power, alternating in office. This period is marked by prolonged stagflation, political instability, corruption, misgovernment, geopolitical rivalry with India, and the clash between left-wing and right-wing ideologies. As PML (N) secured a supermajority in elections in 1997, Nawaz Sharif authorised nuclear testings, as a retaliation to the second nuclear tests conducted by India in May 1998.

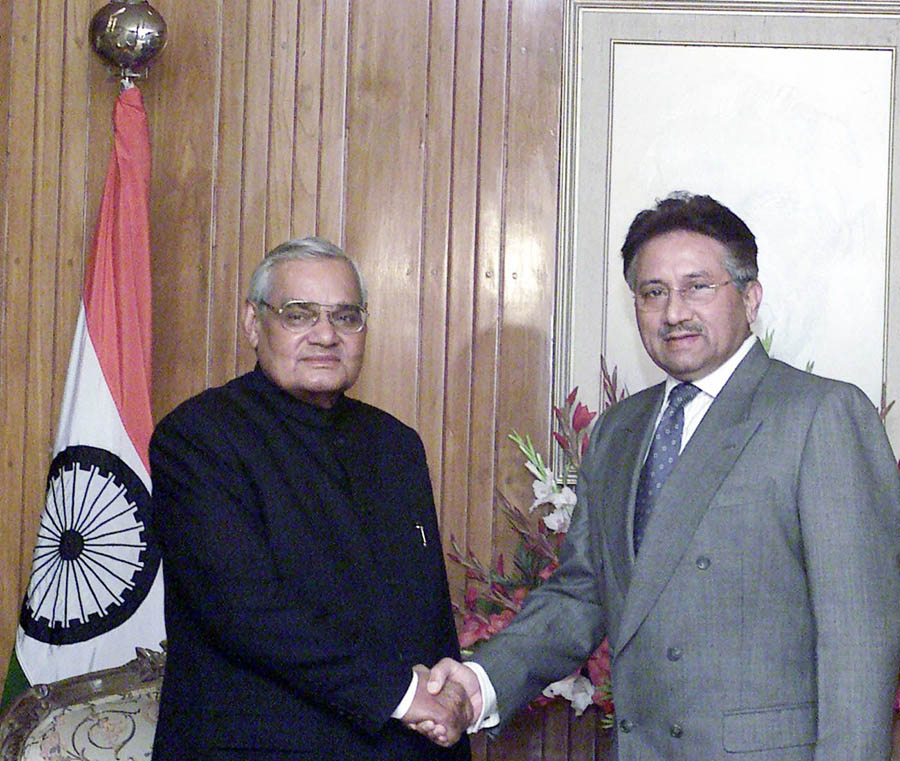
President Musharraf meets with Indian Prime Minister Vajpayee in Islamabad at the sidelines of the 12th SAARC summit in 2004.

Military tension between the two countries in the Kargil district led to the Kargil War of 1999, and turmoil in civil-military relations allowed General Pervez Musharraf to take over through a bloodless coup d'état. Musharraf governed Pakistan as chief executive from 1999 to 2002 and as president from 2001 to 2008—a period of enlightenment, social liberalism, extensive economic reforms, and direct involvement in the US-led war on terrorism. By its own financial calculations, Pakistan's involvement in the war on terrorism has cost up to $118 billion, over eighty one thousand casualties, and more than 1.8 million displaced civilians.

The National Assembly historically completed its first full five-year term on 15 November 2007. After the assassination of Benazir Bhutto in 2007, the PPP secured the most votes in the elections of 2008, appointing party member Yusuf Raza Gilani as Prime Minister. Threatened with impeachment, President Musharraf resigned on 18 August 2008, and was succeeded by Asif Ali Zardari. Clashes with the judicature prompted Gilani's disqualification from the Parliament and as the prime minister in June 2012. The general election held in 2013 saw the PML (N) achieve victory, following which Nawaz Sharif was elected as Prime Minister for the third time. In 2018, PTI won the general election and Imran Khan became the 22nd Prime Minister. In April 2022, Shehbaz Sharif was elected as prime minister, after Imran Khan lost a no-confidence vote. During 2024 general election, PTI-backed independents became the largest bloc, but Shehbaz Sharif was elected prime minister for a second term, as a result of a coalition between PML (N) and PPP.

== Geography ==
Köppen climate classification of Pakistan

Pakistan's diverse geography and climate host a wide array of wildlife. Covering 881,913 km^{2} (340,509 sq mi), Pakistan ranks as the 33rd-largest nation by total area, but this varies based on Kashmir's disputed status. Pakistan boasts a 1,046 km (650 mi) coastline along the Arabian Sea and the Gulf of Oman, and shares land borders totalling 6,774 km (4,209 mi), including 2,430 km (1,510 mi) with Afghanistan, 523 km (325 mi) with China, 2,912 km (1,809 mi) with India, and 909 km (565 mi) with Iran. It has a maritime border with Oman and is separated from Tajikistan via the narrow strip of the Wakhan Corridor. Situated at the crossroads of South Asia, the Middle East, and Central Asia, Pakistan's location is geopolitically significant. Geologically, Pakistan lies at the interaction of the Indian and Eurasian tectonic plates within the Indus–Tsangpo Suture Zone, a region of high seismic activity. The collision between these two plates occurs in northwest Pakistan, particularly in Khyber Pakhtunkhwa. Sindh and Punjab are located on the north-western corner of the Indian Plate, while Balochistan and much of Khyber Pakhtunkhwa lie along its north-western margin. Northern areas of Pakistan, including Azad Kashmir, lie along the northern edge of the Indian Plate and are prone to powerful earthquakes. (Note: Geology: multiple sources: Khan & Clyde (2013); DeVivo et al. (2021); Alisibramulisi et al. (2022); Britannica (Azad Kashmir) (2024))

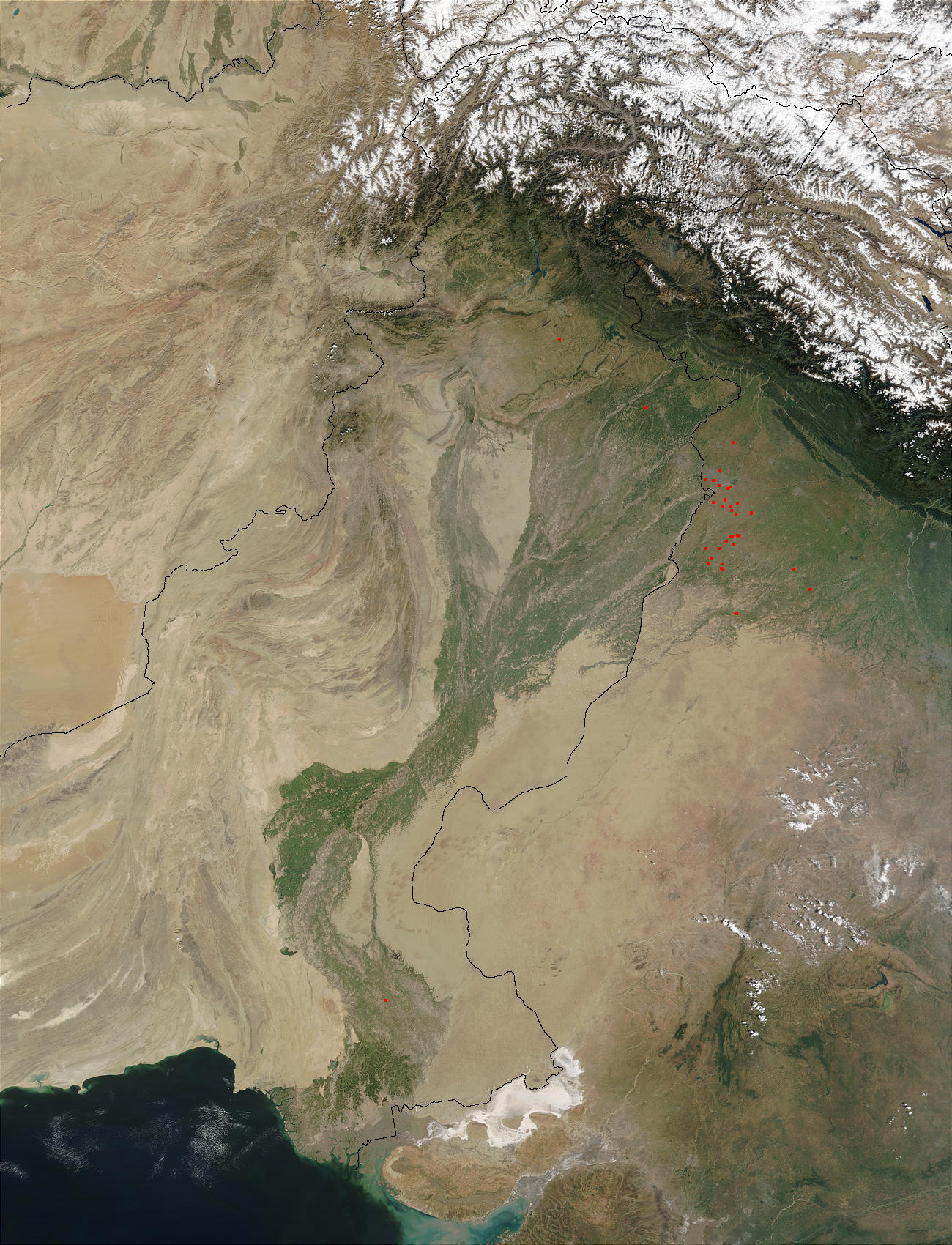
A satellite image showing the topography of Pakistan

Pakistan's landscapes vary from coastal plains to glaciated mountains, offering deserts, forests, hills, and plateaus. Pakistan is divided into three major geographic areas: the northern highlands, the Indus River plain, and the Balochistan Plateau. The northern highlands feature the Karakoram, Hindu Kush, and Pamir mountain ranges, hosting some of the world's highest peaks, including five of the fourteen eight-thousanders (mountain peaks over 8,000 metres or 26,250 feet), notably K2 (8,611 m or 28,251 ft) and Nanga Parbat (8,126 m or 26,660 ft). The Balochistan Plateau lies in the west and the Thar Desert in the east. The 1,609 km (1,000 mi) Indus River and its tributaries traverse the nation from Kashmir to the Arabian Sea, sustaining alluvial plains along the Punjab and Sindh regions.

The climate varies from tropical to temperate, with arid conditions in the coastal south. There is a monsoon season with frequent flooding due to heavy rainfall, and a dry season with significantly less rainfall or none at all. Pakistan experiences four distinct seasons: a cool, dry winter from December through February; a hot, dry spring from March through May; the summer rainy season, or southwest monsoon period, from June through September; and the retreating monsoon period of October and November. Rainfall varies greatly from year to year, with patterns of alternate flooding and drought common.

=== Flora and fauna ===
The diverse landscape and climate in Pakistan support a wide range of trees and plants. From coniferous alpine and subalpine trees like spruce, pine, and deodar cedar in the northern mountains to deciduous trees like shisham in the Sulaiman Mountains, and palms such as coconut and date in the southern regions. The western hills boast juniper, tamarisk, coarse grasses, and scrub plants. Mangrove forests dominate the coastal wetlands in the south. Coniferous forests span altitudes from 1,000 to 4,000 metres (3,300 to 13,100 feet) in most northern and northwestern highlands. In Balochistan's xeric regions, date palms and Ephedra are prevalent. In Punjab and Sindh's Indus plains, tropical and subtropical dry and moist broadleaf forests as well as tropical and xeric shrublands thrive. Approximately 4.8% or 36,845.6 square kilometres (3,684,560 ha) of Pakistan was forested in 2021. (Note: The World Bank data lists the total area of Pakistan as 770,880 km², excluding Gilgit-Baltistan, Azad Kashmir, and water areas.)

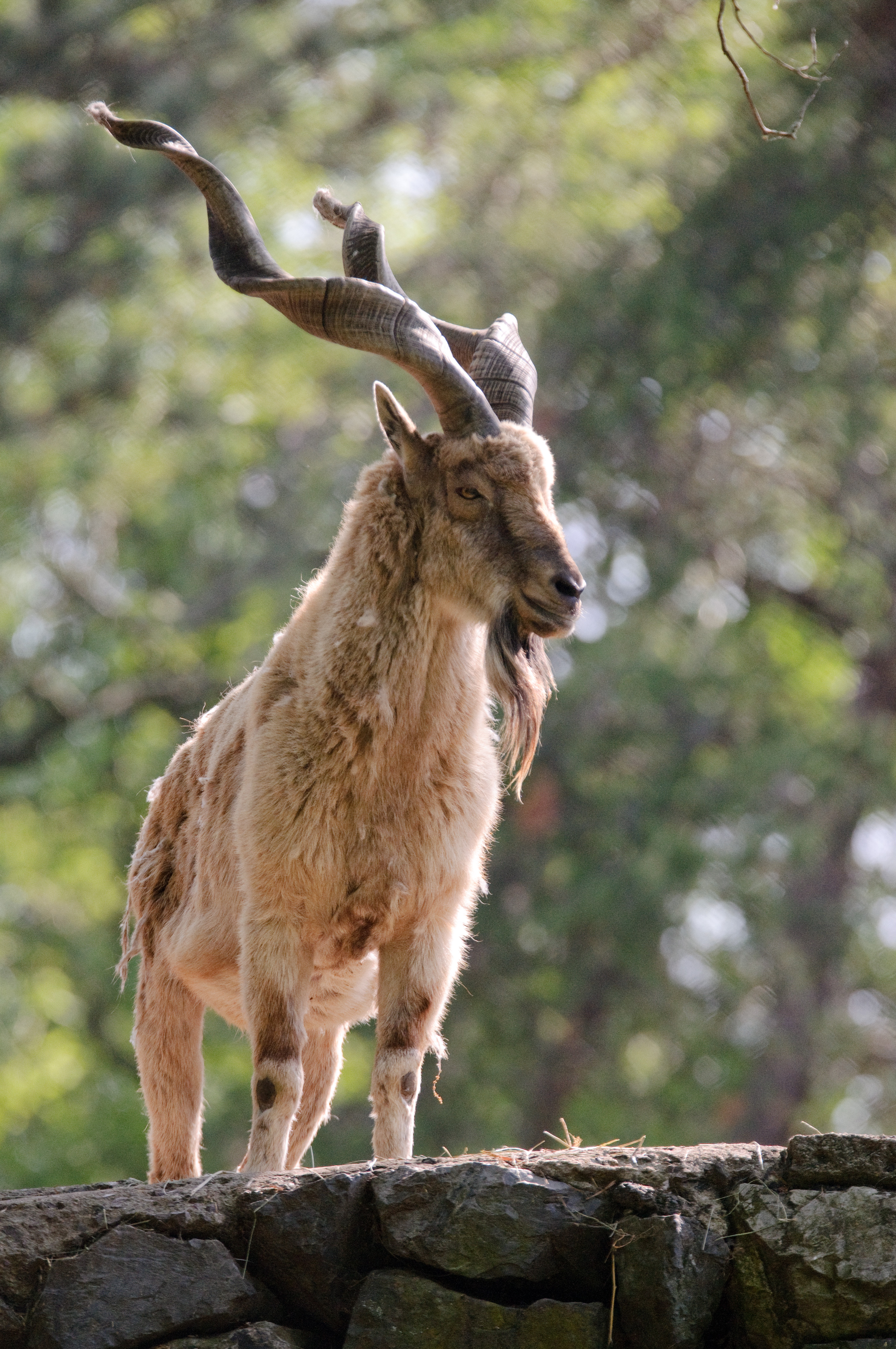
Markhor is the national animal of Pakistan.

Pakistan's fauna mirrors its diverse climate. The country boasts around 668 bird species, including crows, sparrows, mynas, hawks, falcons, and eagles. Palas, Kohistan, is home to the western tragopan, with many migratory birds visiting from Europe, Central Asia, and India. The southern plains harbor mongooses, small Indian civet, hares, the Asiatic jackal, the Indian pangolin, the jungle cat, and the sand cat. Indus is home to mugger crocodiles, while surrounding areas host wild boars, deer, and porcupines. Central Pakistan's sandy scrublands shelter Asiatic jackals, striped hyenas, wildcats, and leopards. The mountainous north hosts a variety of animals like the Marco Polo sheep, urial, markhor goat, ibex goat, Asian black bear, and Himalayan brown bear.

The lack of vegetative cover, severe climate, and grazing impact on deserts have endangered wild animals. The chinkara is the only animal found in significant numbers in Cholistan, with a few nilgai along the Pakistan–India border and in some parts of Cholistan. Rare animals include the snow leopard and the blind Indus river dolphin, of which there are believed to be about 1,816 remaining, protected at the Indus Dolphin Reserve in Sindh. In total, 174 species of mammals, 177 species of reptiles, 22 species of amphibians, 198 species of freshwater fish, 668 species of birds, over 5,000 species of insects, and over 5,700 species of plants have been recorded in Pakistan. Pakistan faces deforestation, hunting, and pollution, with a 2019 Forest Landscape Integrity Index mean score of 7.42/10, ranking 41st globally out of 172 countries.

== Government and politics ==
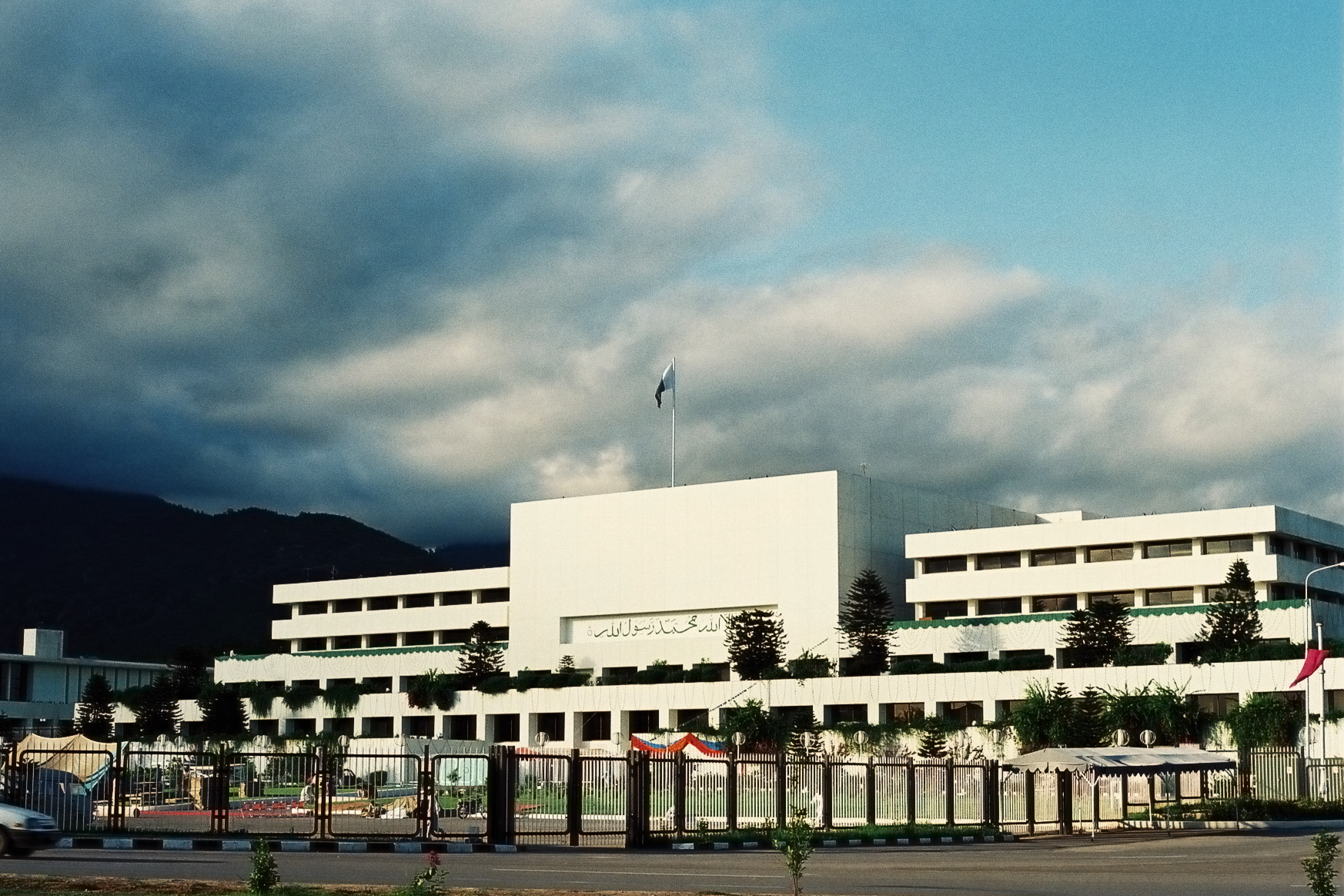
Parliament House

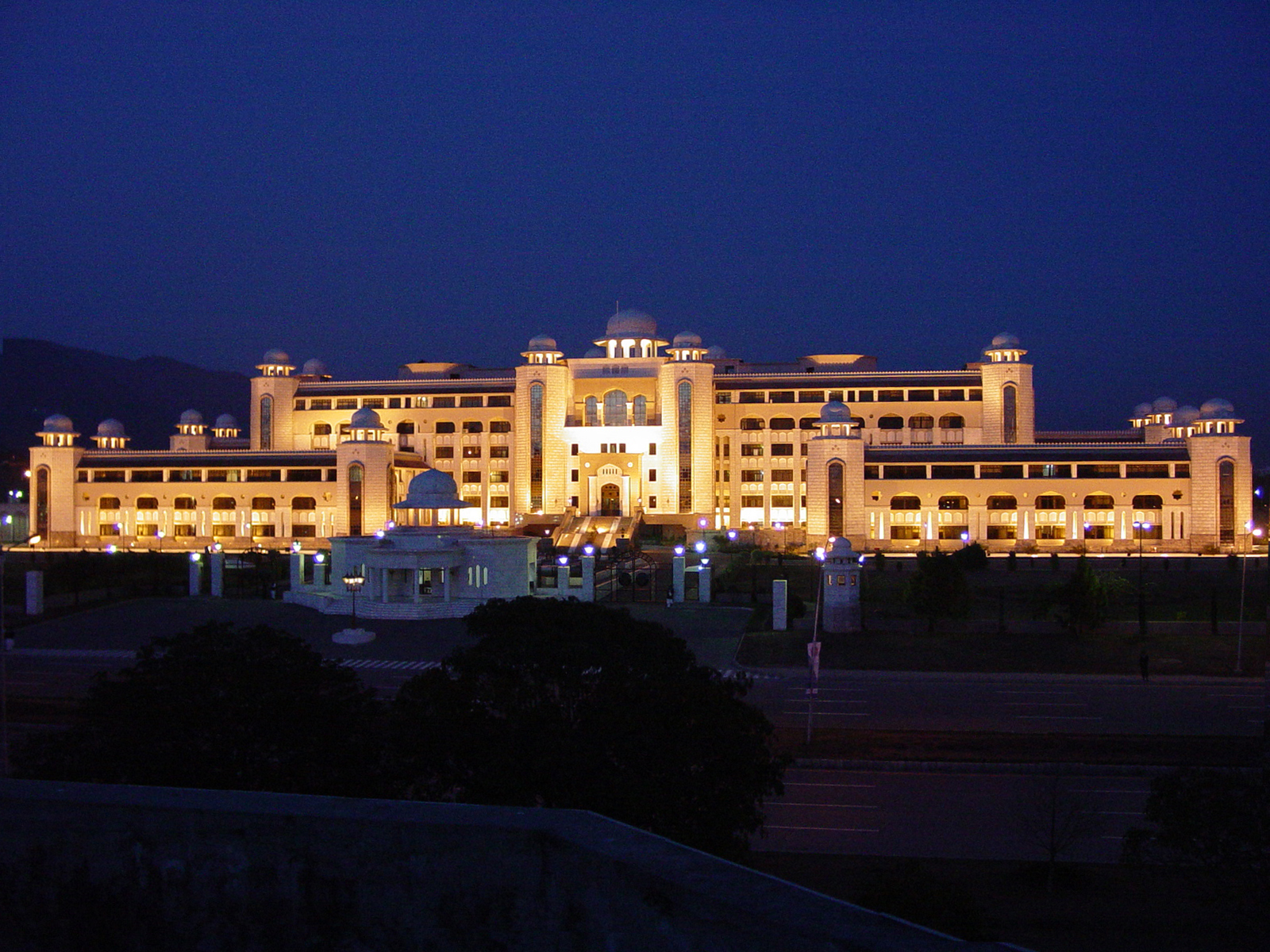
Prime Minister's Office

Supreme Court of Pakistan

Pakistan operates as a democratic parliamentary federal republic, with Islam designated as the state religion. The military's influence in mainstream politics has been significant throughout Pakistan's history. Initially adopting a constitution in 1956, Pakistan saw it suspended by Ayub Khan in 1958, replaced by a second constitution in 1962. Under the leadership of Zulfikar Ali Bhutto, the 1973 constitution established a parliamentary system, but it was suspended under Zia-ul-Haq's martial law in 1977 and restored, with amendments, in 1985. The eras of 1958–1971, 1977–1988, and 1999–2008 witnessed military coups, leading to martial law and military leaders governing de facto as presidents.

Presently, Pakistan operates a multi-party parliamentary system, with distinct checks and balances among government branches. The first successful democratic transition occurred in May 2013. Pakistani politics revolve around a blend of socialism, conservatism, and the third way, with the three main political parties being the conservative Pakistan Muslim League (N), socialist Pakistani People's Party, and centrist Pakistan Tehreek-e-Insaf. Constitutional amendments in 2010 curtailed presidential powers, enhancing the role of the prime minister.

- Head of State: The ceremonial head of the state and civilian commander-in-chief of the Pakistan Armed Forces is the President, elected by an Electoral College. The prime minister advises the president on key appointments, including military and judicial positions, and the president is constitutionally bound to act on this advice. The president also holds powers to pardon and grant clemency.
- Legislative: The bicameral legislature includes a 96-member Senate (upper house) and a 336-member National Assembly (lower house). National Assembly members are elected via first-past-the-post under universal adult suffrage, representing National Assembly constituencies. The constitution reserves 70 seats for women and religious minorities, allocated to political parties based on proportional representation. Senate members are elected by provincial legislators, ensuring equal representation across all provinces.
- Executive: The prime minister, typically the leader of the majority rule party or coalition in the National Assembly (the lower house), serves as the country's chief executive and head of government. Responsibilities include forming a cabinet, making executive decisions, and appointing senior civil servants, subject to executive confirmation.
- Provincial governments: Each of the four provinces follows a similar governance system, with a directly elected choosing the Chief Minister, usually from the largest party or coalition. Chief Ministers lead the provincial cabinet and oversee provincial governance. The Chief Secretary, appointed by the prime minister, heads the provincial bureaucracy. Provincial assemblies legislate and approve the provincial budget, typically presented by the provincial finance minister annually. Ceremonial heads of provinces, the Provincial Governors, are appointed by the president based on the binding advice of the prime minister.
- Judicature: The judiciary in Pakistan has two classes: the superior and subordinate judiciary. The superior judiciary includes the Supreme Court of Pakistan, Federal Shariat Court, and five high courts, with the Supreme Court at the top. It's responsible for safeguarding the constitution. Azad Kashmir and Gilgit-Baltistan have their own court systems.

=== Role of Islam ===
Pakistan, the only country established in the name of Islam, had overwhelming support among Muslims, especially in provinces like the United Provinces, where Muslims were a minority. This idea, articulated by the Muslim League, the Islamic clergy, and Jinnah, envisioned an Islamic state. Jinnah, closely associated with the ulama, was described upon his death by Maulana Shabbir Ahmad Usmani as the greatest Muslim after Aurangzeb, aspiring to unite Muslims worldwide under Islam.

The Objectives Resolution of March 1949 marked the initial step towards this goal, affirming God as the sole sovereign. Muslim League leader Chaudhry Khaliquzzaman asserted that Pakistan could only truly become an Islamic state after bringing all believers of Islam into a single political unit. Keith Callard observed that Pakistanis believed in the essential unity of purpose and outlook in the Muslim world, expecting similar views on religion and nationality from Muslims worldwide.

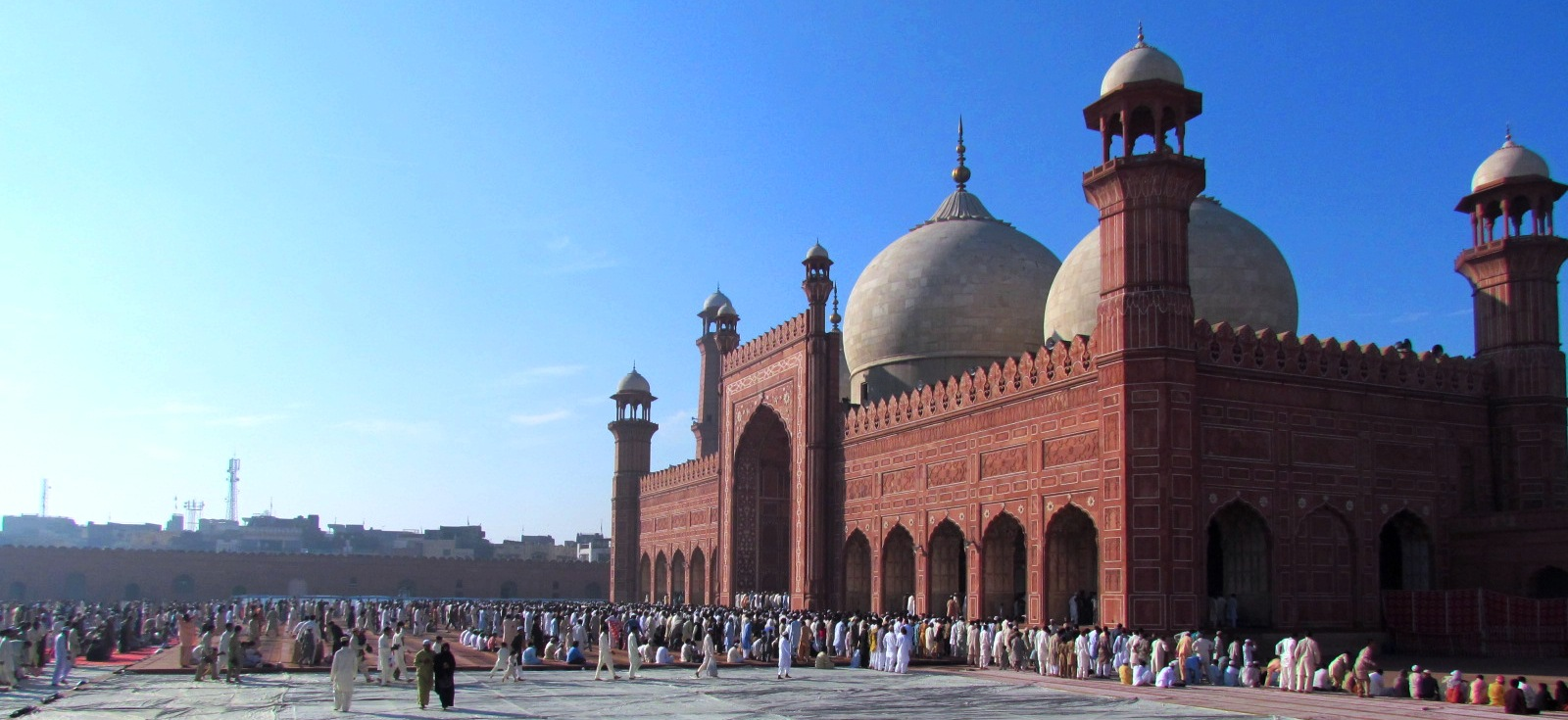
Eid prayers at the Badshahi Mosque in Lahore

Pakistan's desire for a united Islamic bloc, called Islamistan, wasn't supported by other Muslim governments, though figures like the Grand Mufti of Palestine, Al-Haj Amin al-Husseini, and leaders of the Muslim Brotherhood were drawn to the country. Pakistan's desire for an international organisation of Muslim countries was fulfilled in the 1970s when the Organisation of Islamic Conference (OIC) was formed. In East Pakistan, Bengali Muslims increasingly prioritised Bengali ethno-nationalism over religious nationalism. The Islamist party Jamaat-e-Islami backed an Islamic state and opposed Bengali nationalism.

After the 1970 general elections, the Parliament crafted the 1973 Constitution. It declared Pakistan an Islamic Republic, with Islam as the state religion, and mandated laws to comply with Islamic teachings laid down in the Quran and Sunnah and that no law repugnant to such injunctions could be enacted. Additionally, it established institutions like the Shariat Court and the Council of Islamic Ideology to interpret and apply Islam.

Zulfikar Ali Bhutto faced opposition under the banner of Nizam-e-Mustafa ("Rule of the Prophet"), advocating an Islamic state. Bhutto conceded to some Islamist demands before being ousted in a coup.

General Zia-ul-Haq, after seizing power, committed to establishing an Islamic state and enforcing sharia law. He instituted Shariat judicial courts, and court benches, to adjudicate using Islamic doctrine. Zia aligned with Deobandi institutions, exacerbating sectarian tensions with anti-Shia policies.

Most Pakistanis, according to a Pew Research Center (PEW) poll, favour Sharia law as the official law, and 94 percent of them identify more with religion than nationality compared to Muslims in other nations.

=== Administrative units ===
Administrative unit	Capital	Population
Balochistan	Quetta	14,894,402
Punjab	Lahore	127,688,922
Sindh	Karachi	55,696,147
Khyber Pakhtunkhwa	Peshawar	40,856,097
Gilgit-Baltistan	Gilgit	1,492,924
Azad Kashmir	Muzaffarabad	4,179,428
Islamabad Capital Territory	Islamabad	2,363,863

Pakistan, a federal parliamentary republic, consists of four provinces: Punjab, Khyber Pakhtunkhwa, Sindh, and Balochistan, along with three territories: Islamabad Capital Territory, Gilgit-Baltistan, and Azad Kashmir. The Government of Pakistan governs the western parts of the Kashmir Region, organised into separate political entities, Azad Kashmir and Gilgit-Baltistan. In 2009, the constitutional assignment (the Gilgit–Baltistan Empowerment and Self-Governance Order) granted Gilgit-Baltistan semi-provincial status, providing it with self-government.

The local government system consists of districts, tehsils, and union councils, with an elected body at each tier.

Clickable map of the four provinces and three federal territories of Pakistan.

A clickable map of Pakistan exhibiting its administrative units.

=== Foreign relations ===
Since independence, Pakistan has aimed to maintain an independent foreign policy. Pakistan's foreign policy and geostrategy focus on the economy, security, national identity, and territorial integrity, as well as building close ties with other Muslim nations. According to foreign policy expert Hasan Askari Rizvi, "Pakistan highlights sovereign equality of states, bilateralism, mutuality of interests, and non-interference in each other's domestic affairs as the cardinal features of its foreign policy."

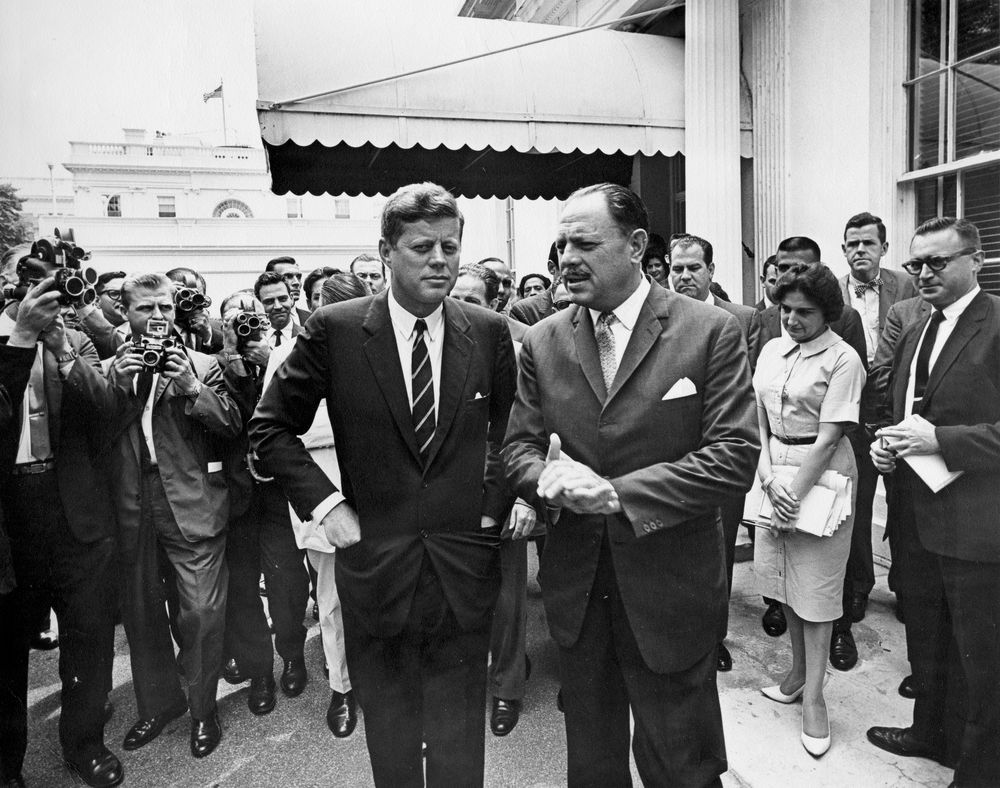
President Ayub Khan meeting with U.S. President John F. Kennedy in 1961

The Kashmir conflict remains a major issue between Pakistan and India, with three of their four wars fought over it. Due partly to strained relations with India, Pakistan has close ties with Turkey and Iran, both focal points in its foreign policy. Saudi Arabia also holds importance in Pakistan's foreign relations.

As a non-signatory of the Treaty on Nuclear Non-Proliferation, Pakistan holds influence in the IAEA. For years, Pakistan has blocked an international treaty to limit fissile material, arguing that its stockpile does not meet its long-term needs. Pakistan's nuclear program in the 20th century aimed to counter India's nuclear ambitions in the region, and reciprocal nuclear tests ensued after India's nuclear tests, solidifying Pakistan as a nuclear power. Pakistan maintains a policy of Full spectrum deterrence, considering its nuclear program vital for deterring foreign aggression.

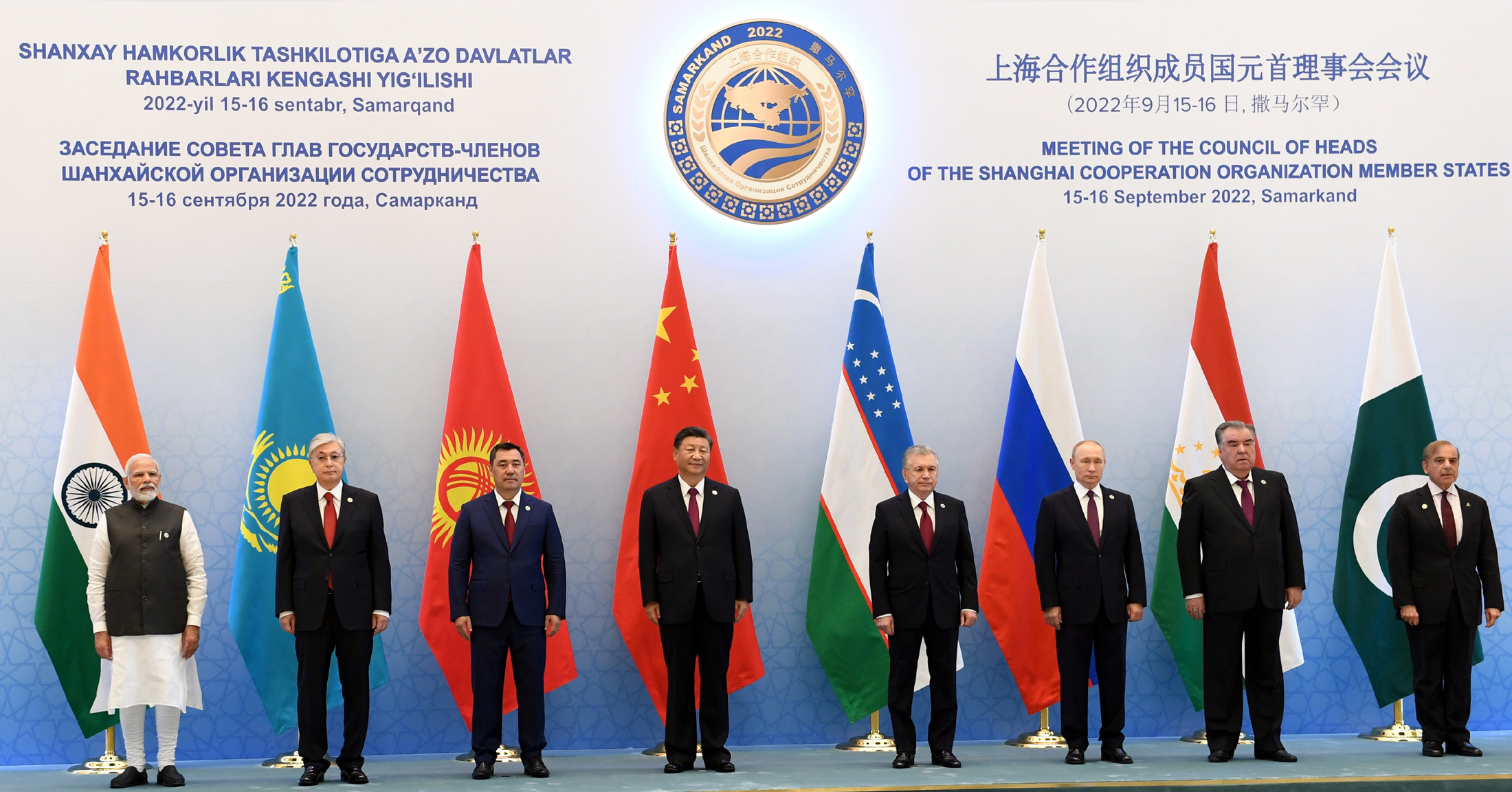
Prime Minister Shehbaz Sharif at the 2022 Shanghai Cooperation Organisation summit

Located strategically in the world's major maritime oil supply lines and communication fiber optic corridors, Pakistan also enjoys proximity to the natural resources of Central Asian countries. Pakistan actively participates in the United Nations with a Permanent Representative representing its positions in international politics. It has advocated for the concept of "enlightened moderation" in the Muslim world. Pakistan is a member of the Commonwealth of Nations, SAARC, ECO, and the G20 developing nations.

Pakistan is designated as an "Iron Brother" by China, emphasising the significance of their close and supportive relationship. In the 1950s, Pakistan opposed the Soviet Union for geopolitical reasons. During the Soviet–Afghan War in the 1980s, it was a close ally of the United States. Relations with Russia have improved since the end of the Cold War, but Pakistan's relationship with the United States has been "on-and-off". Initially a close ally during the Cold War, Pakistan's relations with the US soured in the 1990s due to sanctions over its secretive nuclear program. Since 9/11, Pakistan has been a US ally on counterterrorism, but their relationship has been strained due to diverging interests and mistrust during the 20-year war and terrorism issues. Although Pakistan was granted major non-NATO ally status by the U.S. in 2004, it faced accusations of supporting the Taliban insurgents in Afghanistan.

Pakistan does not have formal diplomatic relations with Israel; nonetheless, an exchange occurred between the two countries in 2005, with Turkey acting as an intermediary.

==== Relations with China ====
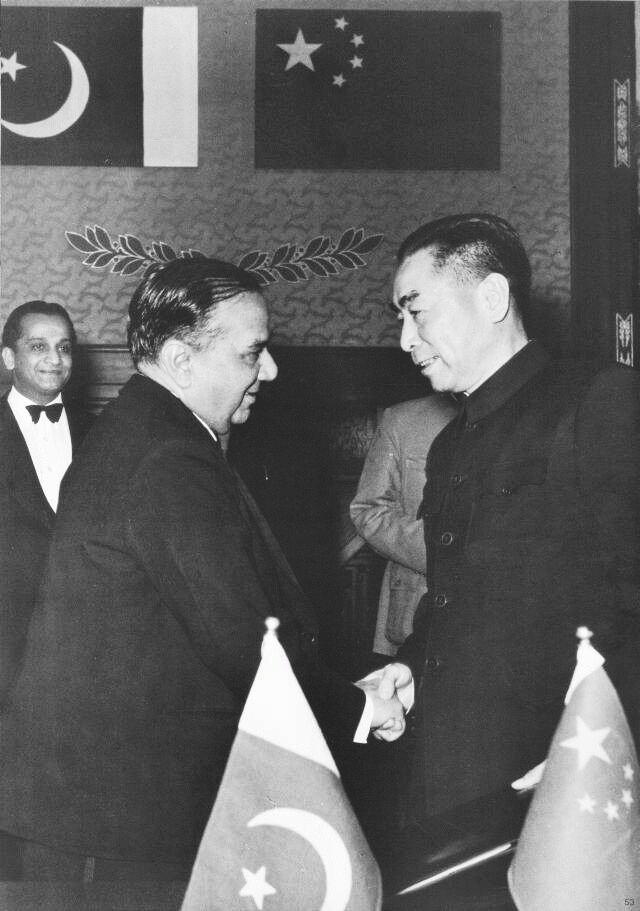
Pakistani Prime Minister Huseyn Shaheed Suhrawardy with Chinese Premier Zhou Enlai signing the Treaty of Friendship Between China and Pakistan. Pakistan is host to China's largest embassy.

Pakistan was among the first nations to establish formal diplomatic ties with China, forging a strong relationship since China's 1962 conflict with India, culminating in a special bond. During the 1970s, Pakistan acted as an intermediary in U.S.-China rapprochement, facilitating US President Richard Nixon's historic visit to China. Despite changes in Pakistani governance and regional/global dynamics, China's influence in Pakistan remains paramount. In reciprocation, China stands as Pakistan's largest trading partner, with substantial investment in Pakistani infrastructure, notably the Gwadar port. In 2015 alone, they inked 51 agreements and Memorandums of Understanding (MoUs) for cooperative efforts. Both nations signed a Free Trade Agreement in 2006, with China making its largest investment in Pakistan's history through CPEC. Pakistan acts as China's liaison to the Muslim world, and both nations support each other on sensitive issues like Kashmir, Taiwan, Xinjiang, and more.

==== Relations with the Muslim world ====
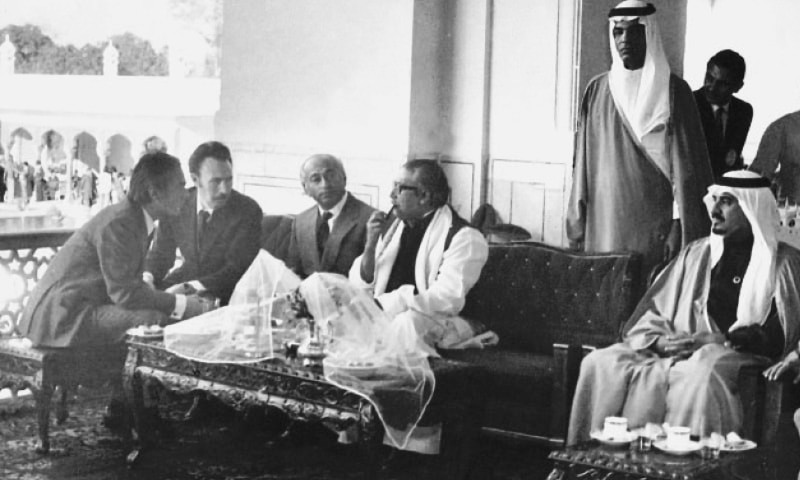
Pakistani Prime Minister Zulfikar Ali Bhutto with leaders from Algeria, Bangladesh, and Saudi Arabia in Lahore, February 1974. That year, Pakistan hosted 36 Muslim countries at the Second Islamic Summit of the Organisation of Islamic Cooperation.

After Independence, Pakistan vigorously pursued bilateral relations with other Muslim countries. The Ali brothers sought to project Pakistan as the natural leader of the Islamic world, partly due to its significant manpower and military strength. Khaliquzzaman, a prominent Muslim League leader, declared Pakistan's ambition to unite all Muslim countries into Islamistan, a pan-Islamic entity.

These developments, alongside Pakistan's creation, didn't receive approval from the United States, with British Prime Minister Clement Attlee expressing a hope for India and Pakistan to reunite. However, due to a nationalist awakening in the Arab world at that time, there was little interest in Pakistan's Pan-Islamic aspirations. Some Arab countries perceived the 'Islamistan' project as Pakistan's bid to dominate other Muslim states.

Pakistan's founder, Muhammad Ali Jinnah, consistently advocated for the Palestinian cause, shaping Pakistan's foreign policy to support Palestinian rights within the broader framework of Muslim solidarity. During the 1967 Arab-Israel war, Pakistan supported the Arab states and played a key role in securing Iran's backing for the Arab cause both within the U.N. and beyond.

Pakistan's relations with Iran have been strained by sectarian tensions, with both Iran and Saudi Arabia using Pakistan as a battleground for their proxy sectarian war. Since the early days of the Iran–Iraq war, President Zia-ul-Haq played an important mediatory role, with Pakistan actively engaging in efforts to end the conflict. Pakistan provided support to Saudi Arabia during the Gulf War. Pakistan chose to remain neutral during Operation Decisive Storm, refraining from sending military support to Saudi Arabia in its offensive against Yemen. Instead, Pakistan aimed to play a proactive diplomatic role in resolving the crisis, which led to tensions between the two countries. In 2016, Pakistan mediated between Saudi Arabia and Iran following the execution of Shia cleric Nimr al-Nimr, with visits to both countries by then Prime Minister Nawaz Sharif and the Chief of Army Staff, Raheel Sharif.

Pakistan provided refuge to millions of displaced Afghans after the Soviet invasion and supported the Afghan mujahideen in their efforts to expel Soviet forces from Afghanistan. After the Soviets withdrew, infighting erupted among Mujahideen factions over control of Afghanistan. Pakistan facilitated peace talks to help end the conflict. After four years of unresolved conflict between rival Mujahideen groups, Pakistan helped establish the Taliban as a stabilising force. Pakistan's support for the Sunni Taliban in Afghanistan challenged Shia-led Iran, which opposed a Taliban-controlled Afghanistan.

Pakistan vigorously advocated for self-determination among Muslims globally. Its efforts in supporting independence movements in countries like Indonesia, Algeria, Tunisia, Morocco, and Eritrea fostered strong ties. Due to its support for Azerbaijan in the Nagorno-Karabakh conflict, Pakistan has not established diplomatic relations with Armenia.

Pakistan and Bangladesh have experienced strained relations, particularly under the Awami League governments led by Sheikh Hasina, driven by her pro-India stance and historical grievances.

Pakistan, a prominent member of the Organisation of Islamic Cooperation (OIC), prioritises maintaining cultural, political, social, and economic relations with Arab and other Muslim-majority nations in its foreign policy.

In September 2025, Pakistan and Saudi Arabia signed a Strategic Mutual Defence Agreement under which any aggression against one country is considered an aggression against both, formalising a defensive commitment that also extends Pakistan's nuclear umbrella to Saudi Arabia.

=== Kashmir conflict ===
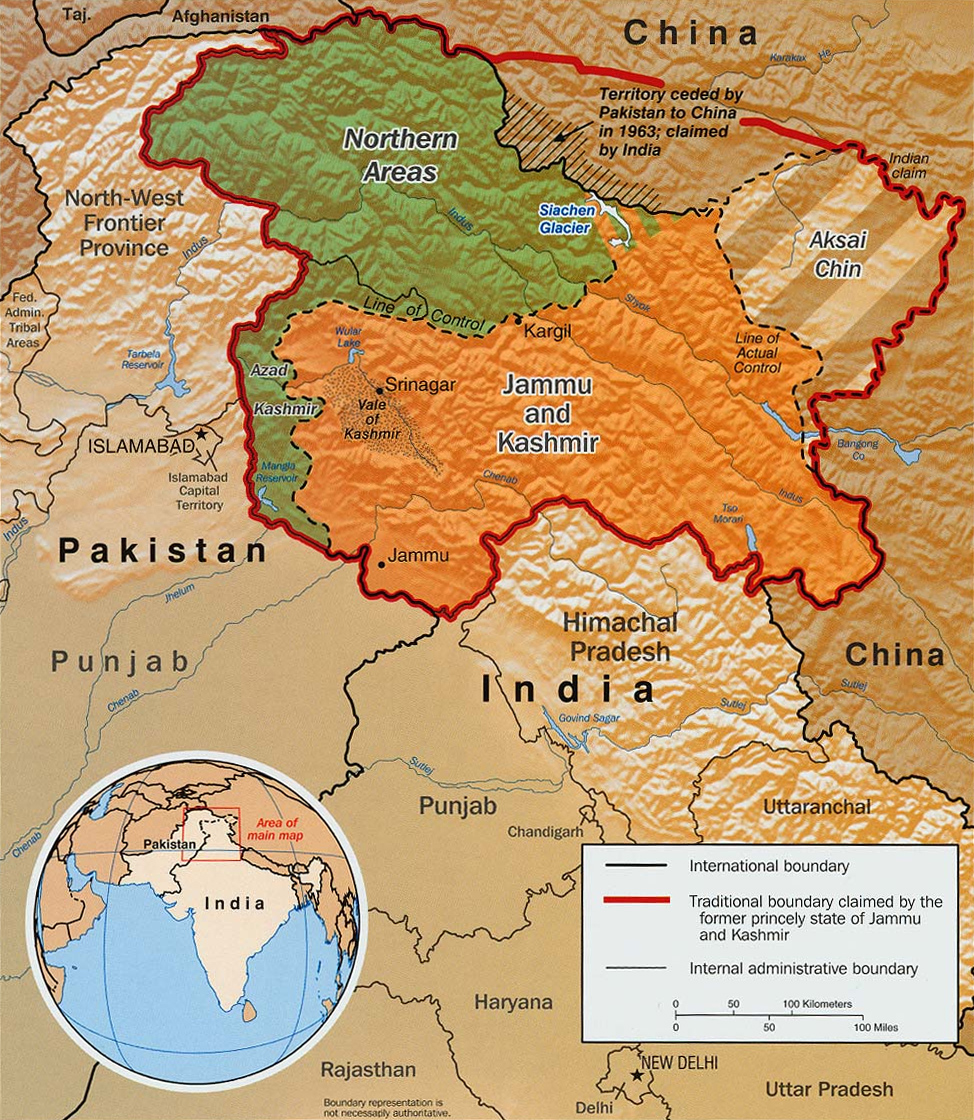
The areas shown in green are the Pakistani-controlled areas.

Kashmir, a Himalayan region at the northern tip of the Indian subcontinent, was governed as the autonomous princely state of Jammu and Kashmir during the British Raj before the Partition of India in August 1947. This sparked a major territorial dispute between India and Pakistan, resulting in several conflicts over the region. India controls about 45.1% of Kashmir, including Jammu and Kashmir and Ladakh, while Pakistan controls roughly 38.2%, comprising Azad Jammu and Kashmir and Gilgit−Baltistan. Additionally, about 20% of the region, known as Aksai Chin and the Shaksgam Valley, is under Chinese control. India claims the entire Kashmir region based on the Instrument of Accession signed by the princely state's ruler, Maharaja Hari Singh, while Pakistan argues for its Muslim-majority population, and geographical proximity to Pakistan. The United Nations was involved in resolving the conflict, leading to a ceasefire in 1949 and the establishment of the Line of Control (LoC) as a de facto border. India, fearing Kashmir's secession, did not hold the promised plebiscite, as it believed Kashmiris would vote to join Pakistan.

Pakistan claims that its position is for the right of the Kashmiri people to determine their future through impartial elections as mandated by the United Nations, while India has stated that Kashmir is an "integral part" of India, referring to the 1972 Simla Agreement and to the fact that regional elections take place regularly. Certain Kashmiri independence groups believe that Kashmir should be independent of both India and Pakistan.

=== Military ===
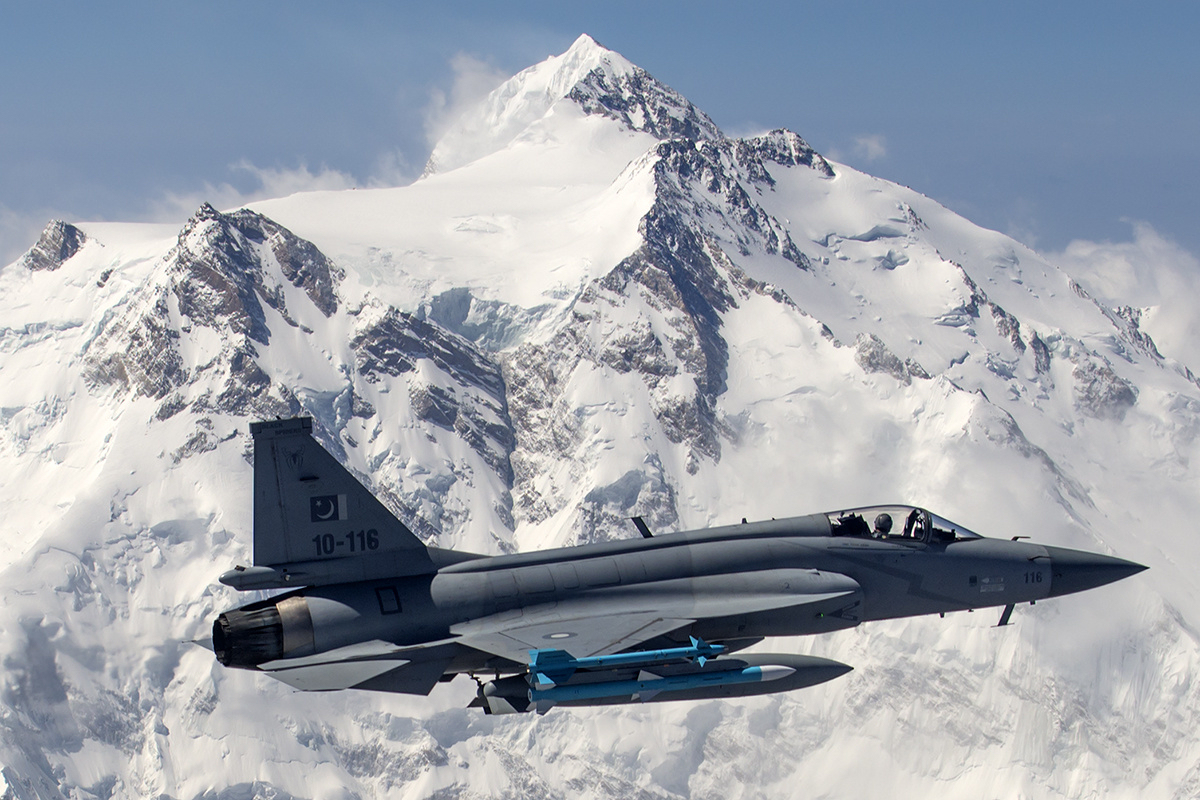
Pakistan Air Force's JF-17 Thunder flying in front of the 8,130-metre-high (26,660-foot) Nanga Parbat

Pakistan is considered a middle power nation, (Note: Middle power: multiple sources: Buzan (2004); Solomon (1997); Rajagopalan (2011); Buzan & Waever (2003); Paul (2012, p. 11) "The regional powers such as Israel or Pakistan are not simple bystanders of great power politics in their regions; they attempt to asymmetrically influence the major power system often in their own distinct ways."; Vandamme (2014, p. 14) "Countries like Saudi Arabia and Pakistan have enough influence to not be considered small, but not enough to be major powers. Within the limits of their regions, they play a significant political role. Thus instinctively, they would qualify as middle powers. While it is not the objective here to question the characteristics of Jordan's definition of middle powers, we argue that Pakistan is in fact a middle power despite its being nuclear-armed. When looking at the numbers, for instance, it appears that Saudi Arabia and Pakistan can be classified as middle powers.") (Note: In the framework of their regional security complex theory (RSCT), Barry Buzan and Ole Waever differentiate between superpowers and great powers which act and influence the global level (or system level) and regional powers whose influence may be large in their regions but have less effect at the global level. This category of regional powers includes Brazil, Egypt, India, Iran, Iraq, Israel, Nigeria, Pakistan, Saudi Arabia, South Africa and Turkey.) with the world's seventh-largest standing armed forces in terms of personnel size, comprising approximately 660,000 active-duty troops and 291,000 paramilitary personnel as of 2024. Established in 1947, the armed forces of Pakistan wielded significant influence over national politics. The main branches include the Army, Navy, and Air Force, supported by numerous paramilitaries.

The Chairman of the Joint Chiefs of Staff Committee (CJCSC) is the highest-ranking military officer, advising the civilian government. However, they lack direct command over the branches and serve as intermediaries, ensuring communication between the military and civilian leadership. Overseeing the Joint Staff Headquarters, they coordinate inter-service cooperation and joint military missions.

Command and control over Pakistan's strategic arsenal development and employment is vested in the National Command Authority, overseeing work on nuclear doctrine to maintain Full spectrum deterrence.

The United States, Turkey, and China maintain close military relations with Pakistan Armed Forces, regularly exporting military equipment and technology transfer. (Note: Military relations: multiple sources: Yadav (2024); Lalwani (2023); Kronstadt (2023); Bruno & Bajoria (2008)) Pakistan was the 5th-largest recipient and importer of arms between 2019 and 2023.

==== Military history ====
Since 1947, Pakistan has been involved in four conventional wars with India. The first conflict took place in Kashmir and ended in a United Nations-mediated ceasefire, with Pakistan gaining control of one-third of the region. Territorial disputes led to another war in 1965. In 1971, India and Pakistan fought another war over East Pakistan, with Indian forces aiding its independence, leading to the creation of Bangladesh. Tensions in Kargil brought the two countries to the brink of war.

Pakistan's primary intelligence agency, the Inter-Services Intelligence (ISI), was established within a year of Pakistan's independence in 1947. During the Soviet–Afghan War, Pakistan's intelligence community, mostly the ISI, coordinated US resources to support Afghan mujahideen and foreign fighters against Soviet presence. The PAF engaged with Soviet and Afghan Air Forces during the conflict. Pakistan has been an active participant in UN peacekeeping missions, playing a major role in operations like the rescue mission in Mogadishu, Somalia, in 1993. According to a 2023 UN report, the Pakistani military was the fifth largest troop contributor to UN peacekeeping missions.

Pakistan has deployed its military in some Arab countries, providing defense, training, and advisory roles. The PAF's fighter pilots participated in missions against Israel during the Six-Day War and the Yom Kippur War. Pakistani special forces assisted Saudi forces in Mecca during the Grand Mosque Seizure. (Note: Miller (2015) "Not since the tenth century had such a maverick crew occupied Islam's holiest sanctuary, and for nearly two weeks Saudi Special Forces assisted by Pakistani and French commandos fought pitched battles to reclaim the compound.") Pakistan also sent 5,000 troops as part of a US-led coalition for the defense of Saudi Arabia during the Gulf War.

Despite the UN arms embargo on Bosnia, the ISI under General Javed Nasir airlifted anti-tank weapons and missiles to Bosnian mujahideen, shifting the tide in favour of Bosnian Muslims. ISI, under Nasir's leadership, supported Chinese Muslims in Xinjiang, rebel groups in the Philippines, and religious groups in Central Asia.

Since 2001, the Pakistan military has been engaged in counterinsurgency and internal security operations in the Khyber Pakhtunkhwa province, primarily targeting Tehrik-e-Taliban Pakistan and associated militant groups. Major military operations conducted during this period include Operation Enduring Freedom, Operation al-Mizan, Operation Zalzala, Operation Sherdil, Operation Rah-e-Haq, Operation Rah-e-Rast, and Operation Rah-e-Nijat.

=== Law enforcement ===
Law enforcement in Pakistan consists of federal and provincial police agencies. Each of the four provinces (Punjab, Sindh, Khyber Pakhtunkhwa, and Balochistan) has its own police force, while the Islamabad Capital Territory (ICT) has the Islamabad Police. Provincial police forces are led by an Inspector-General of Police (IGP), who is appointed from the federally recruited and trained Police Service of Pakistan (PSP) through a consultative process between the federal and provincial governments. All positions above the Assistant Superintendent level are filled from the PSP, ensuring national standards across provincial forces.

Specialised Units:

- National Highways & Motorway Police (NHMP): Enforces traffic laws and ensures safety on Pakistan's inter-provincial motorway network.
- Specialised Rapid Response Units: Specialised counter-terrorism units, such as the Punjab Elite Police Force, have been trained by army commandos and exist in every province to respond to hostage situations and neutralise armed groups.

The Civil Armed Forces (CAF) assist local law enforcement agencies and participate in border security and internal security operations, particularly in conflict-affected regions.

In 2021, the National Intelligence Coordination Committee was established to improve coordination among Pakistan's intelligence agencies. The inaugural meeting was attended by the heads of the ISI, IB, and FIA.

=== Crime ===
According to the 2025 Global Organized Crime Index, Pakistan had a criminality score of 6.32 out of 10, ranking 45th among 193 countries, and a resilience score ranking 131st among 193 countries, with the latter measuring the country's capacity to withstand and respond to organized crime.

According to the Federal Investigation Agency's annual report, the agency received more than 73,000 cybercrime complaints in 2024, of which 1,604 were registered as cases, with financial fraud accounting for nearly half of all complaints. In 2025, the National Cyber Crimes Investigation Agency estimated that cybercrime had increased by about 35% compared with the previous year. A 2025 survey conducted on behalf of Visa Inc. found that 55% of respondents in Pakistan had fallen victim to an online scam in 2024, while 20% reported having been victims more than once.

Pakistan scored 27 out of 100 on the Corruption Perceptions Index in 2024, ranking 135th out of 180 countries in the assessment of perceived public-sector corruption.

=== Human rights ===
In Pakistan, all sexual activity outside of marriage is illegal. The punishment for sex outside marriage (zina) ranges from up to five years' imprisonment for minors to 100 lashes for unmarried adults and stoning to death for married adults, depending on marital status, age, sanity, and whether strict evidentiary requirements for a hadd punishment—such as four adult male Muslim witnesses or a confession—are met; however, no one has been stoned to death under the law to date. Male homosexuality is illegal in Pakistan and is punishable by up to ten years in prison, corporal punishment such as whipping, and, under Islamic law since 1990, potentially even stoning.

Honour killings, locally referred to as karo-kari in parts of Pakistan, involve the killing of women and, less frequently, men by family or community members over alleged extramarital relationships or perceived violations of honour. Human rights organisations report that hundreds of women are killed each year, with many cases unreported. Pakistan also has a high number of reported acid attacks, with about 200 incidents annually as of 2023, most victims being women. According to Masarrat Misbah, founder of the Depilex Smileagain Foundation, women have been targeted for rejecting marriage proposals, giving birth to daughters instead of sons, or insufficient dowry. The 2011 Acid and Burn Crime Bill criminalised acid attacks, making them punishable by lengthy imprisonment and fines.

In parts of Pakistan, girls are given in marriage to settle disputes or crimes between families in a customary practice called Vani. Girls married through this practice are often treated as compensation for a dispute, which places them in a vulnerable social position within the family they marry into. In 2021, the Federal Shariat Court declared the practice un-Islamic and unconstitutional, reaffirming earlier Supreme Court jurisprudence.

UN Women reported in 2024 that around one in six girls in Pakistan are married during childhood, with the country home to nearly 19 million child brides. In 2025, Pakistan enacted a law setting the minimum legal age for marriage at 18 and introducing penalties for arranging underage marriages; the law is limited to the Islamabad Capital Territory and does not apply nationwide.

== Economy ==
Economic indicators
GDP (PPP)	$1.81 trillion (2026)
GDP (PPP) per capita	$7,370 (2026)
GDP (nominal)	$450.13 billion (2026)
GDP (nominal) per capita	$1,840 (2026)
Real GDP growth	3.6% (2026)
CPI inflation	4.5% (2025)
Unemployment	8% (2025)
Labour force participation rate	53% (2024)
Gini	29.6 (2018)
HDI	0.544 (2023)
Total external debt	$131 billion (2023)
National wealth	$678 billion (2022)

Pakistan's economy ranks 26th globally by purchasing power parity (PPP) and 42nd by nominal GDP. Historically, Pakistan was part of the wealthiest region in the first millennium CE, but lost ground to regions like China and Western Europe by the 18th century. Pakistan is a developing country, and part of the Next Eleven, poised to become one of the world's largest economies in the 21st century, alongside the BRIC countries. The semi-industrialised economy is heavily dependent on agriculture, and industrial growth in Pakistan benefits significantly from agricultural expansion. Pakistan's economy has shifted from agriculture to trade and services, with agriculture contributing about one-fifth of GDP and manufacturing one-sixth, while trade and services form the largest share. In 2023, Pakistan was the 66th-largest export economy, with a trade deficit of US$21.3 billion.

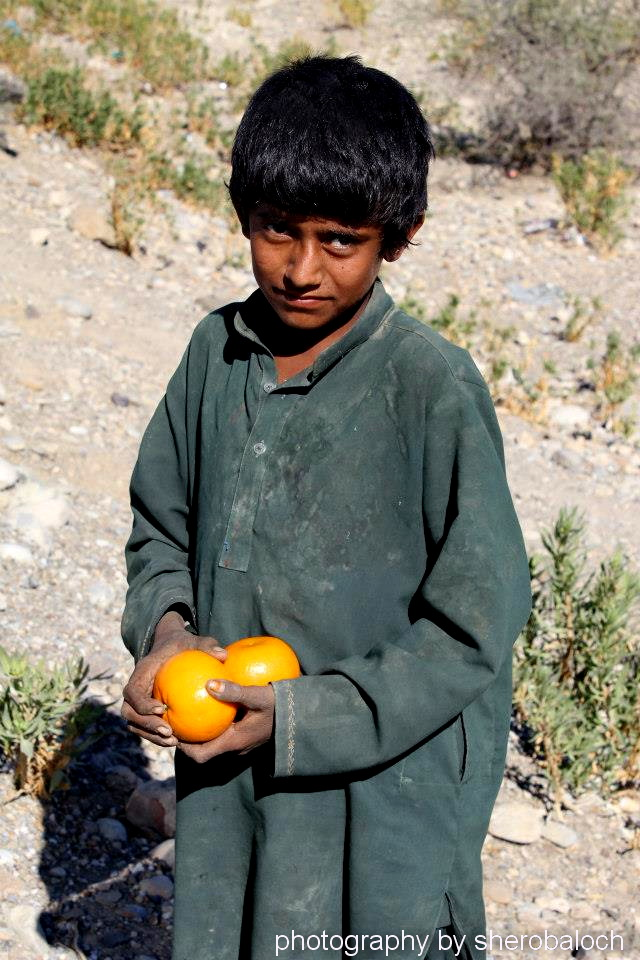
A poor boy in Balochistan, around 44.7% of the population live below the international poverty line in Pakistan

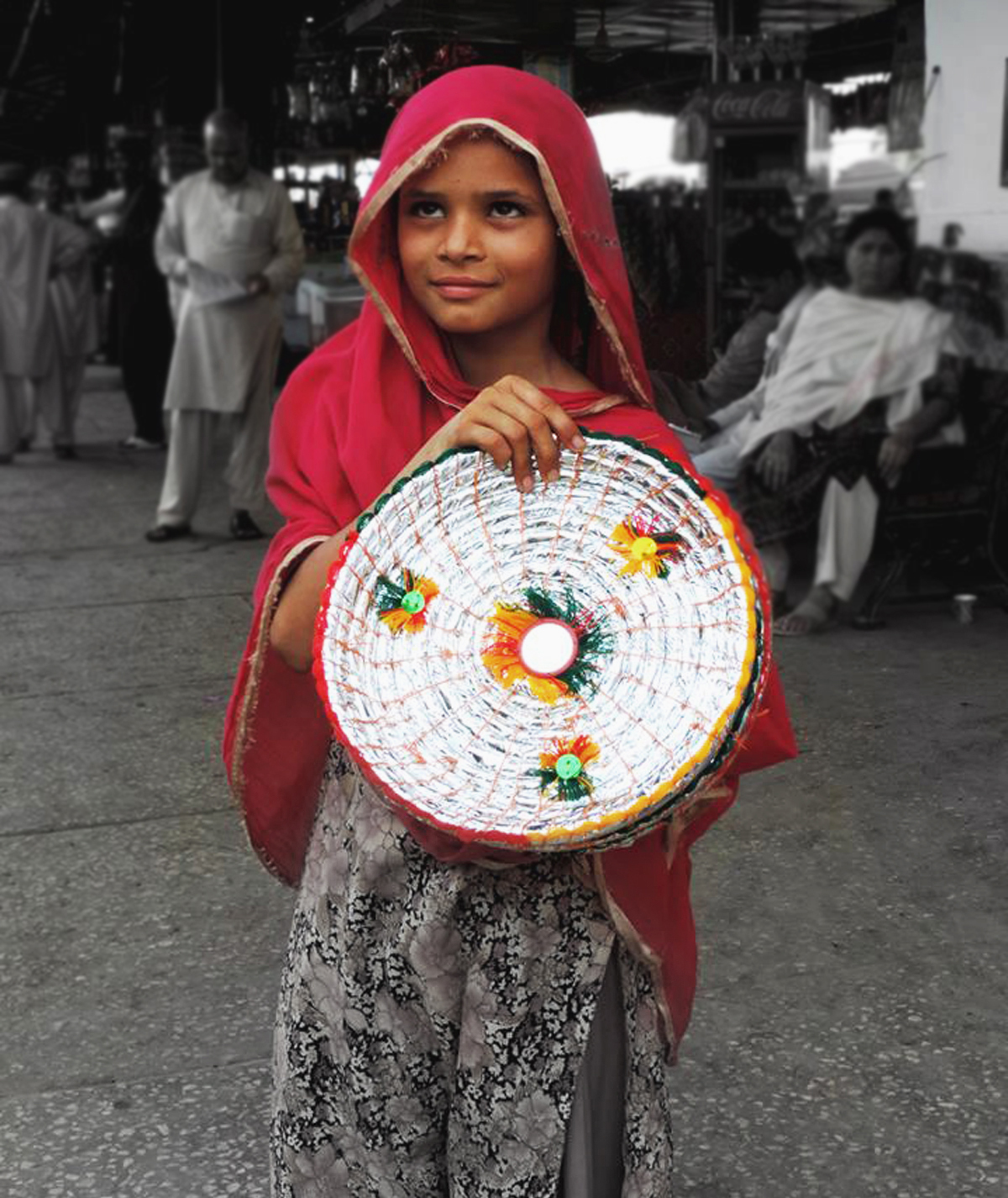
Handcrafts seller girl in Sindh, 16.5% of Pakistani population live in extreme poverty on less than US$3 a day

As of 2026, Pakistan's nominal GDP stood at US$450.13 billion, while GDP (PPP) was US$1.81 trillion. The nominal per capita GDP was US$1,840, and the GDP (PPP)/capita amounted to US$7,370 (international dollars). Around 44.7% of the population live below the international poverty line of US$4.20 a day, 16.5% live in extreme poverty on less than US$3 a day, 8% of the total labour force is unemployed, and CPI inflation in 2025 was 4.5%. Pakistan ranks near the bottom globally on the Global Gender Gap Index's economic participation and opportunity sub-index for women, reflecting very low female labour force participation and limited representation of women in senior economic roles. Pakistan's middle class is estimated to be around 40–50 million people, representing 15–20 per cent of the population. Among South Asian countries, Pakistan's GDP growth rate of 2.5% in 2024 was the second lowest after Afghanistan.

Pakistan has strong potential to produce diverse food commodities due to its vast natural resource base across varied ecological and climatic zones. It has the world's 7th-largest labour force, and its diaspora of around 10 million, sent US$38.3 billion in remittances in fiscal year 2024–25, as reported by the Special Investment Facilitation Council. Pakistan's share of global exports averaged 0.14% between 1990 and 2023 and was 0.12% in 2023.

=== Services ===
As of 2025–26, the services sector was the largest contributor to Pakistan's GDP, accounting for 58.42% of GDP. The sector accounted for 41.6% of total employment in 2024–25. In the International Telecommunication Union's ICT Development Index, Pakistan's score increased from 56.4 in 2025 to 67.7 in 2026, an increase of 20% from 2025. Approximately 57% of Pakistan's population used the Internet in 2024. In fiscal year 2023–24, Pakistan's ICT exports rose to a record $2.6 billion. Pakistan ranks among the world's top five freelancing markets, with an estimated three million freelancers. During the first ten months of fiscal year 2025–26, freelancers earned more than US$950 million in foreign exchange.

=== Agriculture ===
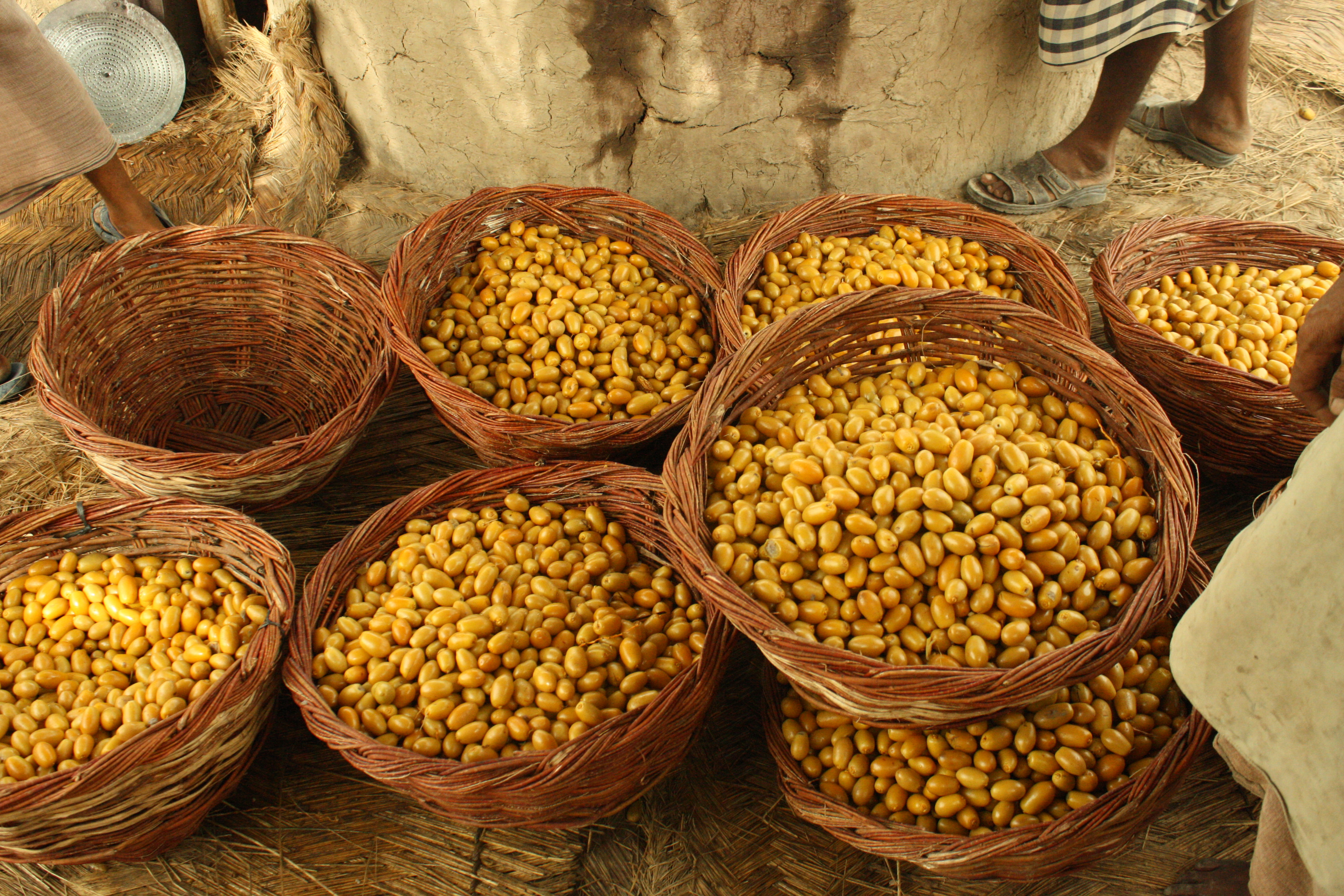
Pakistan is the 6th largest producer of dates in the world.

The agriculture sector employs 43.5% of the labour force and is a major source of foreign exchange. Pakistan produced 28.98 million metric tons of wheat in 2025/2026 (3% of global output), ranking 7th globally. Pakistan ranks fourth in cotton production, fifth in sugar production, and is the fourth-largest milk producer globally. Though land and water resources haven't increased proportionately, productivity gains, especially from the Green Revolution in the late 1960s and 1970s, significantly boosted wheat and rice yields. Private tube wells and High Yielding Varieties (HYVs) further augmented crop yields. Meat industry accounts for 1.4 percent of overall GDP.

=== Industry ===
Industry, constituting 19.74% of GDP and 24% of total employment, is the second-largest sector. Large-scale manufacturing (LSM) dominates, representing 12.2% of GDP, with cement production thriving due to demand from Afghanistan and the domestic real estate sector. In 2013, Pakistan exported 7,708,557 metric tons of cement, with an installed capacity of 44,768,250 metric tons. The textile industry, a key player in Pakistan's manufacturing, contributes 9.5% to GDP and employs around 15 million people. As of 2022, Pakistan ranks seventh globally in cotton production, with substantial spinning capacity, making it a major exporter of textile products in Asia. China has been a significant buyer of Pakistani textiles, importing US$1.527 billion worth of textiles in 2012.

=== Tourism ===
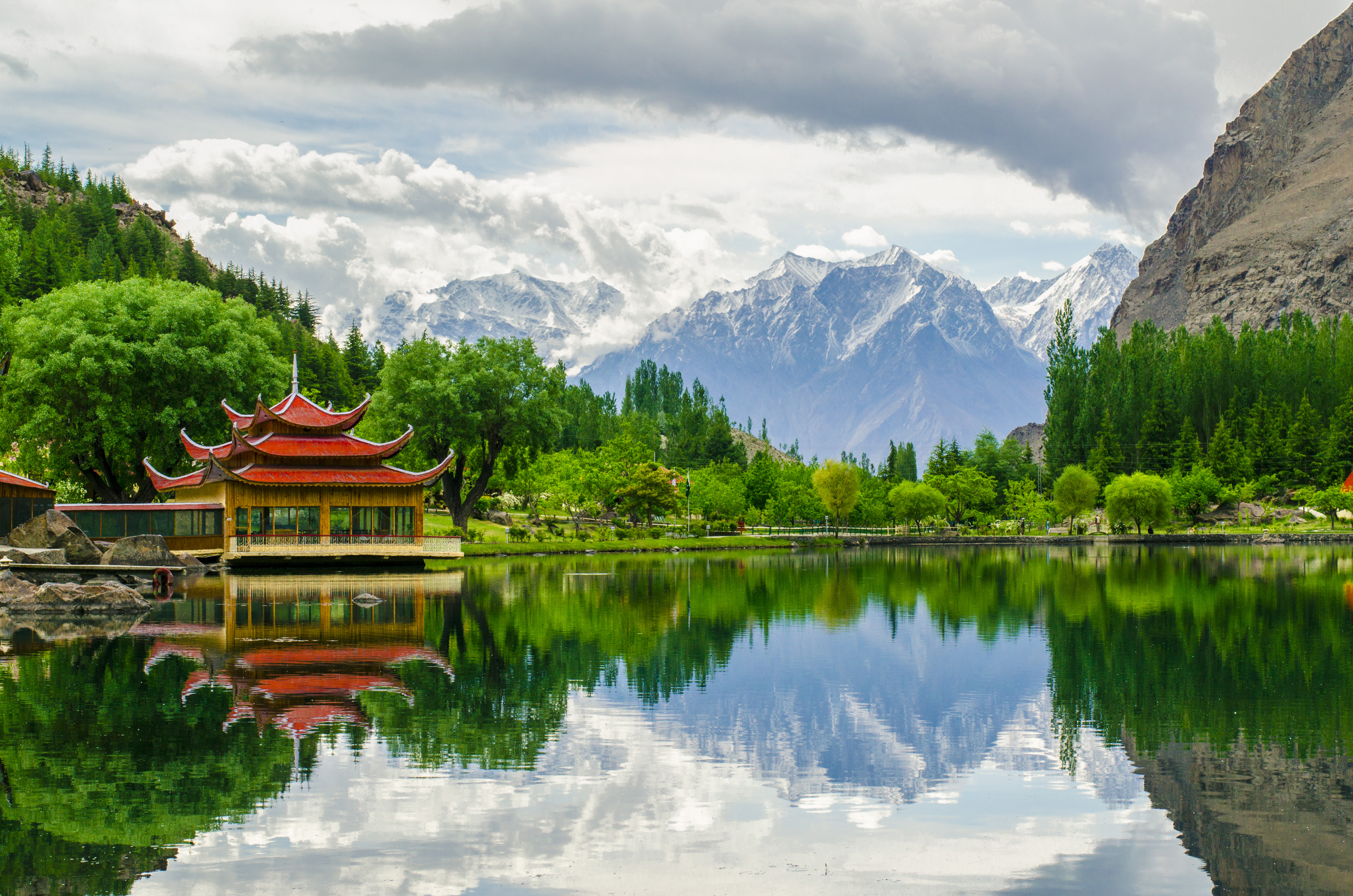
Shangrila Lake and adjoining resort in Skardu, Gilgit-Baltistan

Pakistan drew around 6.6 million foreign tourists in 2018. Pakistan boasts attractions from mangroves in the south to Himalayan hill stations in the northeast, including ancient Buddhist ruins of Takht-i-Bahi and Taxila, the 5,000-year-old Indus Valley civilisation sites such as Mohenjo-daro and Harappa, and numerous mountain peaks over 7,000 metres (23,000 feet). The northern part of Pakistan boasts numerous old fortresses, showcasing ancient architecture. It encompasses the Hunza and Chitral valleys, where the small pre-Islamic Kalasha community resides, claiming descent from Alexander the Great. Lahore, Pakistan's cultural capital, contains lots of Mughal architecture, including the Badshahi Masjid, the Shalimar Gardens, the Tomb of Jahangir, and the Lahore Fort. Following the 2005 Kashmir earthquake, The Guardian highlighted "The top five tourist sites in Pakistan" to boost tourism, featuring destinations like Taxila, Lahore, the Karakoram Highway, Karimabad, and Lake Saiful Muluk. Festivals and government initiatives aim to promote Pakistan's cultural heritage. In 2015, the World Economic Forum ranked Pakistan 125th out of 141 countries in its Travel & Tourism Competitiveness Report.

=== Natural resources ===
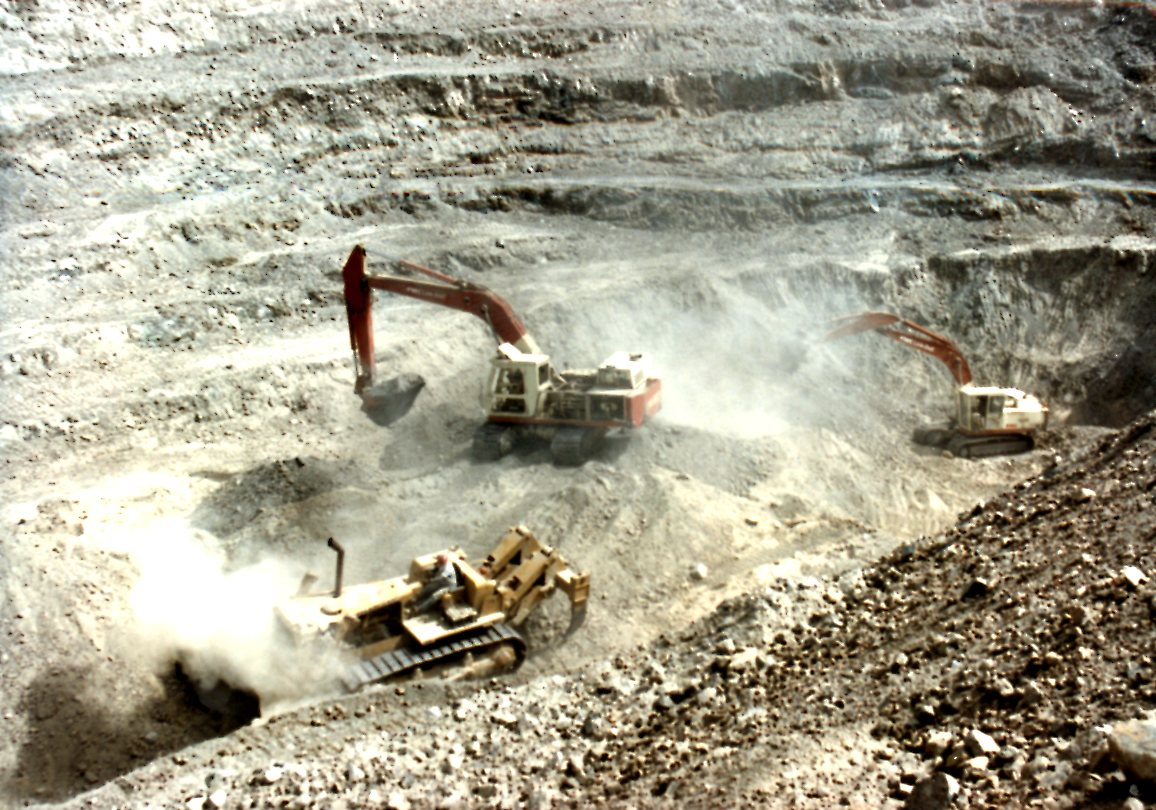
Surface mining in Sindh

Pakistan's untapped coal reserves have been estimated as the fifth largest in the world and equivalent to about 400 billion barrels of oil, exceeding the combined oil reserves of Saudi Arabia and Iran. Daniel Fitzgerald Runde wrote in Forbes in 2016 that Pakistan "could be the 'Saudi Arabia of Coal'."

The Reko Diq Mine has one of the world's largest undeveloped copper deposits, with an estimated 15 million tonnes in reserves, and is expected to become the world's fifth largest copper mine upon completion; a feasibility study also estimates that it could produce approximately 17.9 million ounces of gold over its projected 37-year mine life, with total copper and gold reserves valued at over $60 billion at prevailing prices.

== Infrastructure ==
Pakistan was lauded as the top nation for infrastructure development in South Asia during the 2016 annual meetings of the IMF and World Bank.

=== Power and energy ===
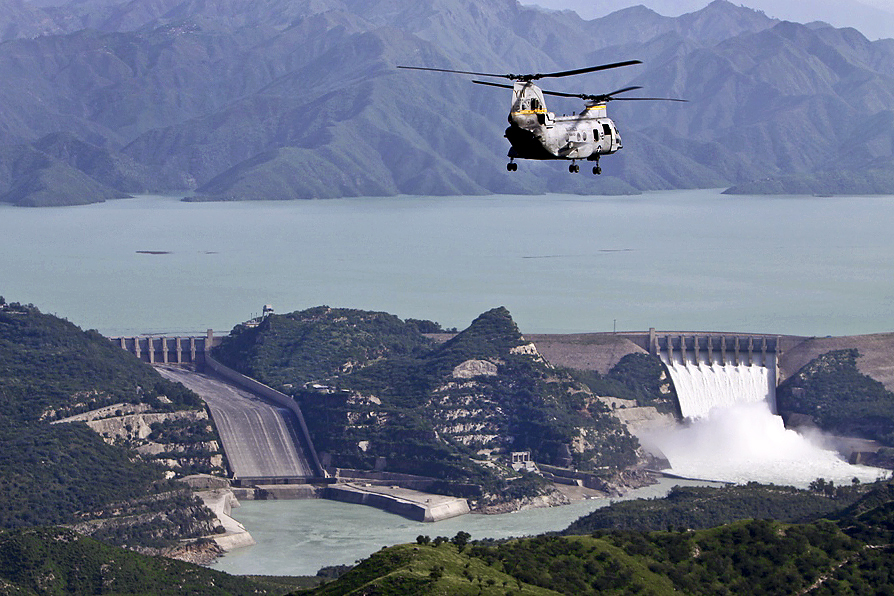
Tarbela Dam, the largest earth filled dam in the world, was constructed in 1968.

As of May 2021, Pakistan operates six licensed commercial nuclear power plants. The Pakistan Atomic Energy Commission (PAEC) oversees these plants, while the Pakistan Nuclear Regulatory Authority ensures their safe operation. These plants contribute approximately 5.8% to Pakistan's electricity supply, while fossil fuels (crude oil and natural gas) provide 64.2%, hydroelectric power provides 29.9%, and coal contributes 0.1%. The KANUPP-I, Pakistan's first commercial nuclear power plant, was supplied by Canada in 1971. Sino-Pakistani nuclear cooperation began in the 1980s, leading to the establishment of CHASNUPP-I. In 2005, both countries proposed a joint energy security plan, aiming for a generation capacity exceeding 160,000 MWe by 2030. Pakistan's Nuclear Energy Vision 2050 targets a capacity of 40,000 MWe, with 8,900 MWe expected by 2030.

In June 2008, the nuclear complex at Chashma in Punjab Province expanded with the installation of Chashma-III and Chashma–IV reactors, each with 325–340 MWe, costing ₨129 billion, with ₨80 billion from international sources, mainly China. Another agreement for China's assistance was signed in October 2008, seen as a response to the US–India agreement. The project's cost was then US$1.7 billion, with a foreign loan of US$1.07 billion. In 2013, Pakistan established a second nuclear complex in Karachi with plans for additional reactors, similar to Chashma. Electrical energy in Pakistan is generated by various corporations and distributed evenly among the four provinces by the National Electric Power Regulatory Authority (NEPRA). However, Karachi-based K-Electric and Water and Power Development Authority (WAPDA) generate much of the electricity used in Pakistan and collect revenue nationwide. In 2023, Pakistan's installed electricity generation capacity was ~45,885 MWt. Pakistan produced 1,135 megawatts of renewable energy for the month of October 2016. Pakistan expects to produce 10,000 megawatts of renewable energy by 2025.

=== Transport ===
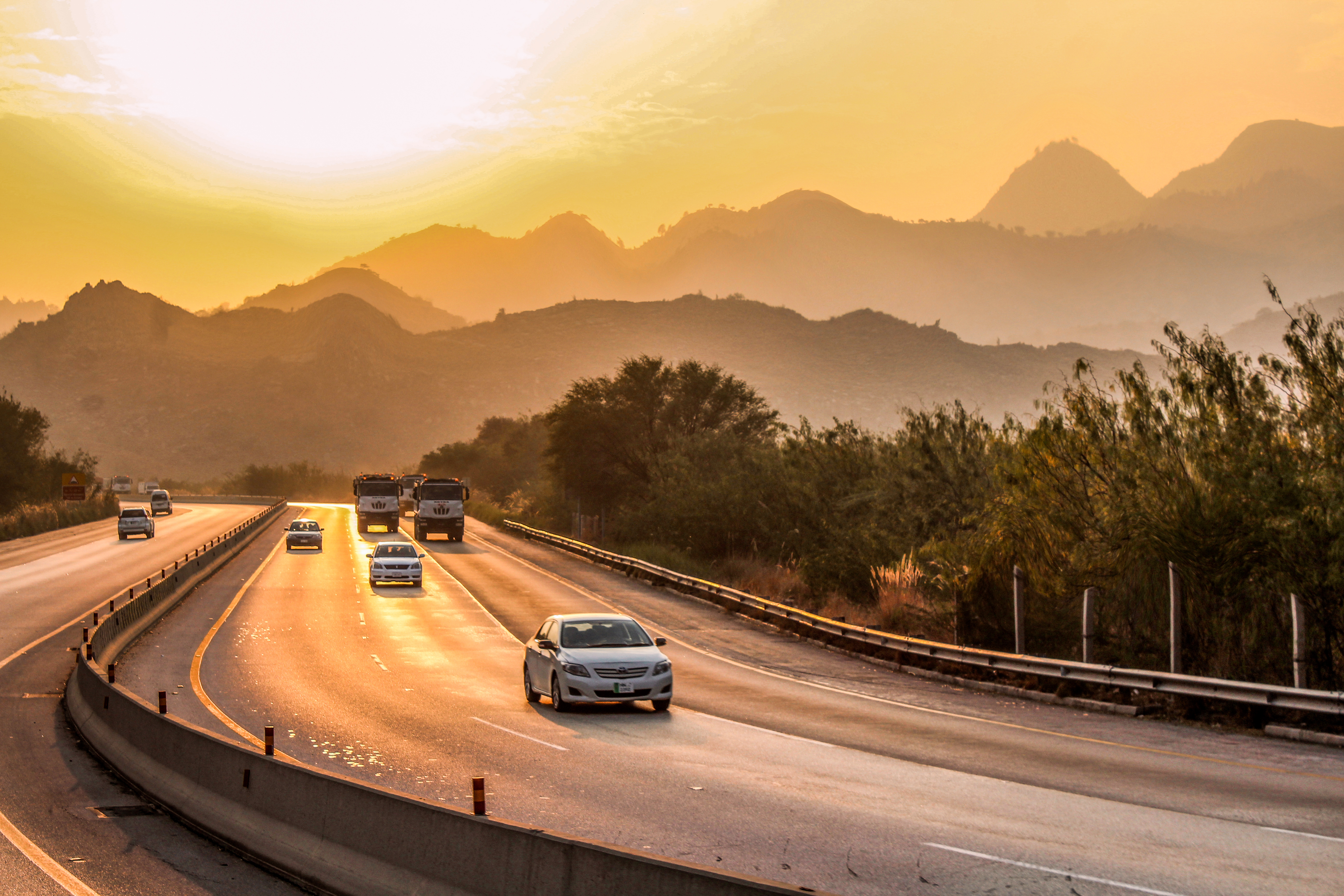
The motorway passes through the Salt Range mountains.

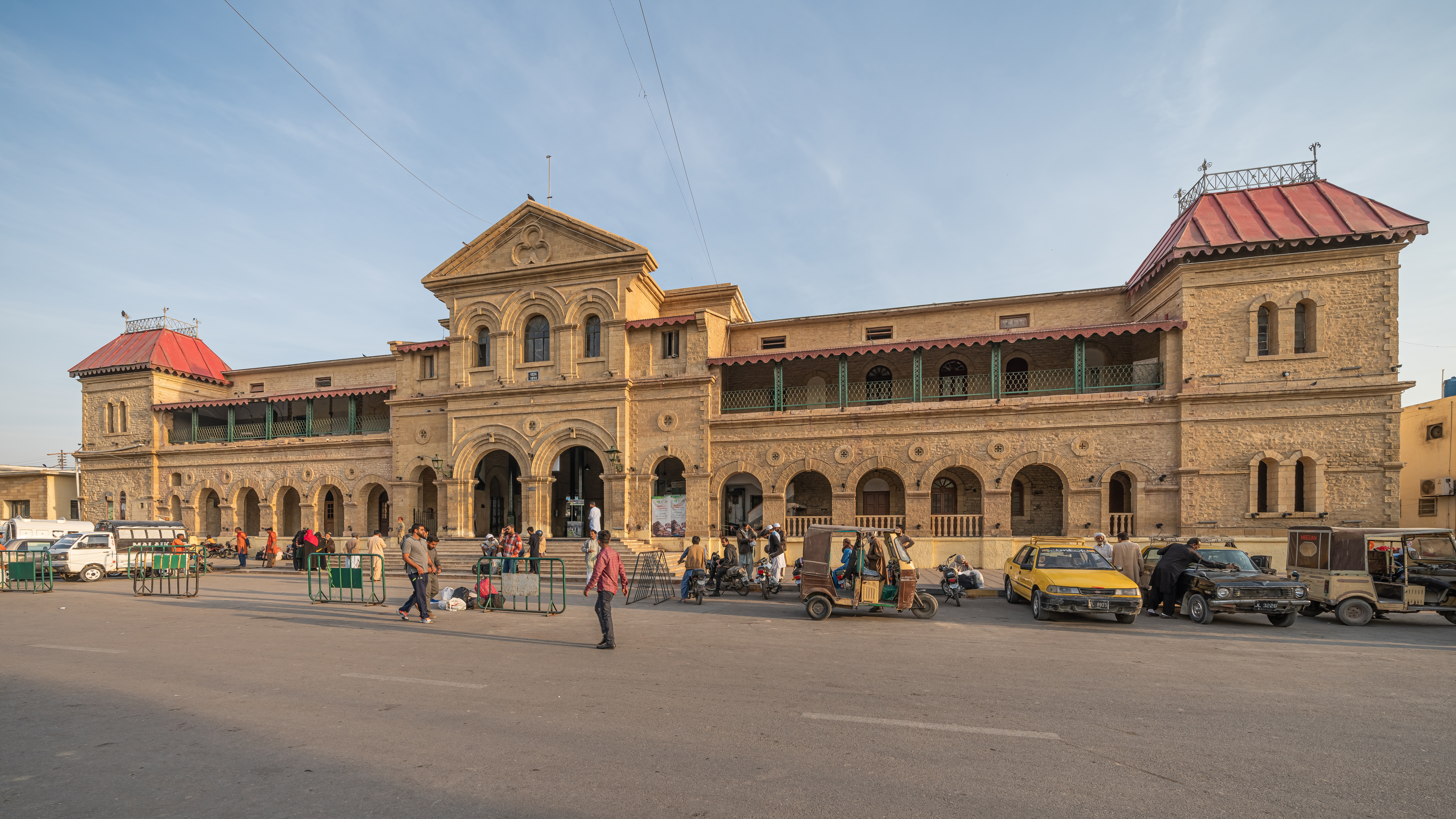
Karachi Cantonment railway station

Pakistan boasts 2567 km of motorways and approximately 263,942 km of highways, which handle 92% of passengers and 96% of freight traffic. Despite constituting only 4.6% of the total road length, these north–south links manage 85% of the nation's traffic. They connect southern seaports such as Karachi port and Port Qasim in Sindh, along with Gwadar Port and Port of Pasni in Balochistan, to populous provinces like Punjab and Khyber Pakhtunkhwa domestically, and neighbouring countries like Afghanistan, Central Asia, and China through the China Pakistan Economic Corridor. According to the WEF's Global Competitiveness Report, Pakistan's port infrastructure quality ratings rose from 3.7 to 4.1 between 2007 and 2016. The railway's share of inland traffic is reduced to below 8% for passengers and 4% for freight. This shift led to a decrease in total rail track from 8,775 kilometres (5,453 miles) in 1990–91 to 7,791 kilometres (4,841 miles) in 2011.

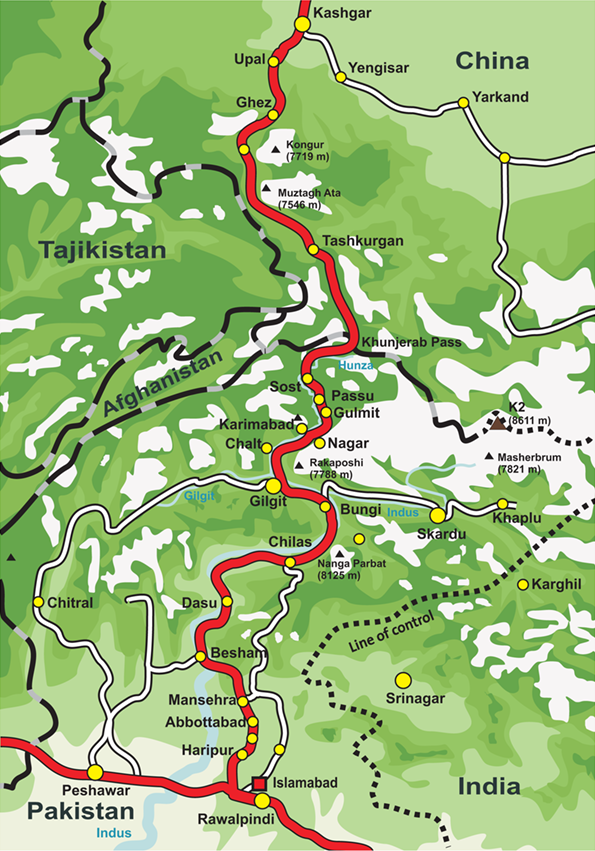
Karakoram Highway, connecting Pakistan to China, is one of the highest paved roads in the world.

The transport landscape of Pakistan features various modern transit systems. The Orange Line Metro Train in Lahore, inaugurated in 2020, spans 27.1 km (16.8 mi), and includes both elevated and underground sections, accommodating over 250,000 passengers daily. Lahore also boasts the Lahore Metrobus, the first of its kind in Pakistan, operational since February 2013. The Rawalpindi-Islamabad Metrobus, stretching 48.1 km, commenced its first phase in June 2015, with subsequent extensions, and employs e-ticketing and an Intelligent Transportation System. Multan Metrobus, inaugurated in January 2017, serves Multan with its rapid transit services. Peshawar's Bus Rapid Transit, inaugurated in August 2020, marks the fourth BRT system in Pakistan. Karachi's Green Line Metrobus, operational since December 2021, is part of a larger metrobus project financed by the Government of Pakistan and initiated in February 2016. Meanwhile, Faisalabad awaits its proposed rapid transit project, the Faisalabad Metrobus. Karachi Circular Railway, partially revived in November 2020, offers public transit services in the Karachi metropolitan area. Additionally, plans are underway to resurrect Karachi's tramway service, which ceased operations in 1975, in collaboration with Austrian experts.

As of 2013, Pakistan boasts approximately 151 airports and airfields, encompassing both military and civilian installations. Despite Jinnah International Airport serving as the primary international gateway, significant international traffic also flows through Lahore, Islamabad, Peshawar, Quetta, Faisalabad, Sialkot, and Multan airports. The civil aviation industry, deregulated in 1993, operates with a blend of public and private entities while state-owned Pakistan International Airlines (PIA) dominates, carrying 73% of domestic passengers and all domestic freight.

=== Science and technology ===
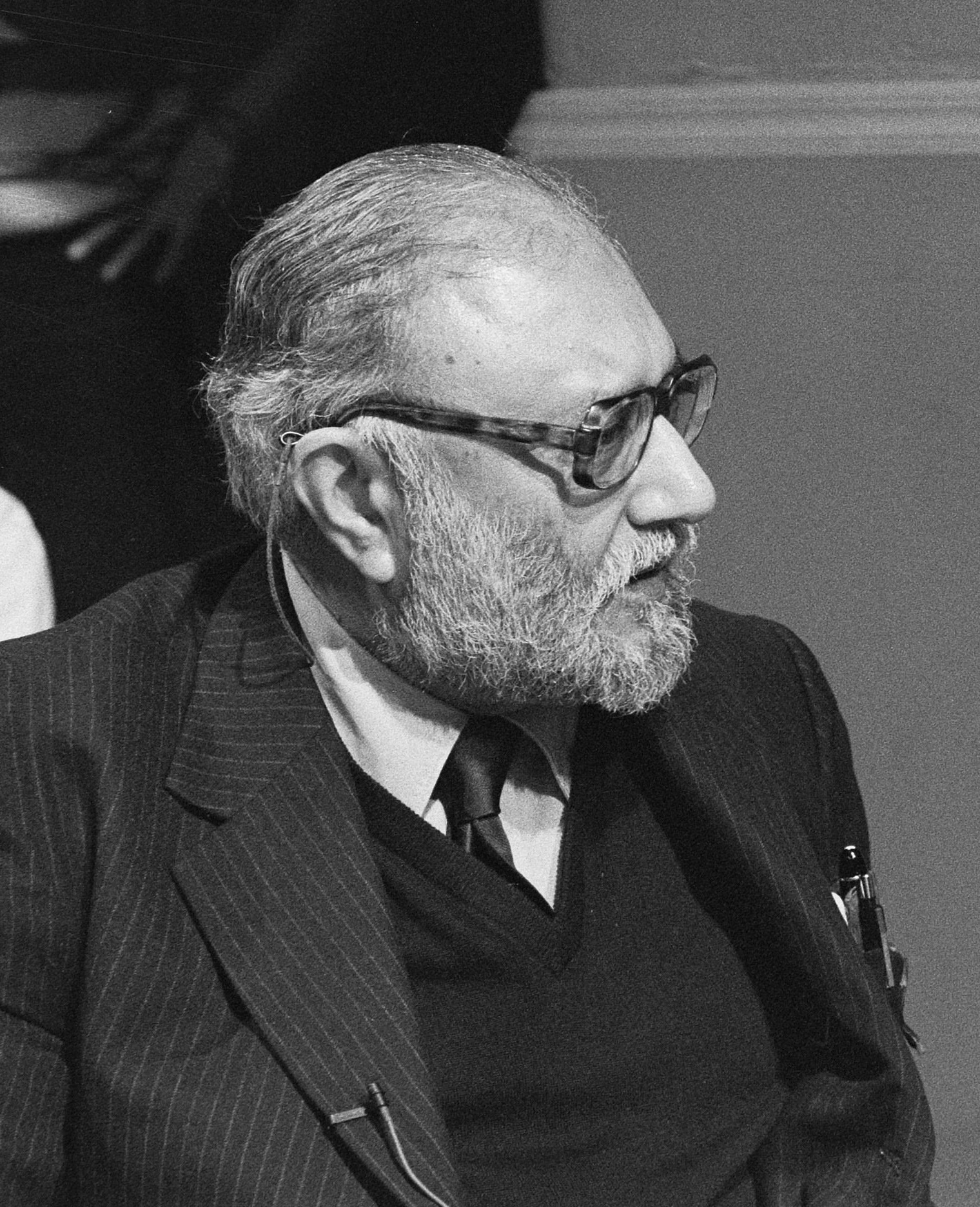
Abdus Salam won the 1979 Nobel Prize in Physics for his contribution to electroweak interaction. He was the first Muslim to win a Nobel prize in science.

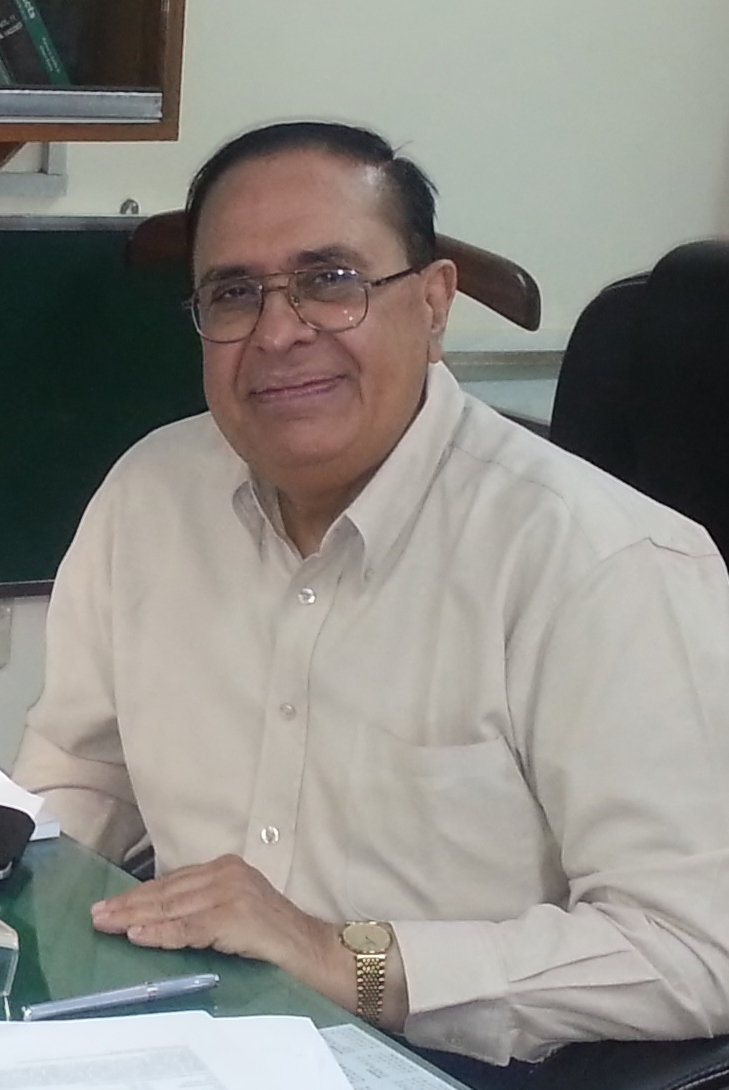
Atta-ur-Rahman won the UNESCO Science Prize for pioneering contributions in chemistry in 1999, the first Muslim to win it.

Developments in science and technology have played a significant role in Pakistan's infrastructure, linking the nation to the global community. Each year, the Pakistan Academy of Sciences and the government invite scientists worldwide to the International Nathiagali Summer College on Physics. In 2005, Pakistan hosted an international seminar on "Physics in Developing Countries" for the International Year of Physics. Pakistani theoretical physicist Abdus Salam won a Nobel Prize in Physics for his work on the electroweak interaction. Pakistani scientists have made notable contributions in mathematics, biology, economics, computer science, and genetics.

In chemistry, Salimuzzaman Siddiqui identified the medicinal properties of the neem tree's components. Ayub K. Ommaya developed the Ommaya reservoir for treating brain conditions. Scientific research is integral to Pakistani universities, national laboratories, science parks, and the industry. Abdul Qadeer Khan spearheaded Pakistan's HEU-based gas-centrifuge uranium enrichment program for its atomic bomb project. He established the Kahuta Research Laboratories (KRL) in 1976, serving as both its senior scientist and the Director-General until his retirement in 2001. Besides atomic bomb project, he made significant contributions in molecular morphology, physical martensite, and their applications in condensed and material physics.

In 2023, Pakistan ranked 26th globally in published scientific papers. The influential Pakistan Academy of Sciences guides the government on science policies. Pakistan was ranked 99th in the Global Innovation Index by 2025.

The 1960s marked the rise of Pakistan's space program, led by SUPARCO, yielding advancements in rocketry, electronics, and aeronomy. Notably, Pakistan launched its first rocket into space, pioneering South Asia's space exploration. In 1990, it successfully launched its first satellite, becoming the first Muslim nation and second in South Asia to achieve this milestone.

Pakistan witnessed a fourfold increase in its scientific productivity in the past decade surging from approximately 2,000 articles per year in 2006 to more than 9,000 articles in 2015. Making Pakistan's cited article's higher than the BRIC countries put together.

— Thomson Reuters's Another BRIC in the Wall 2016 report

Following the 1971 war with India, Pakistan hastily developed atomic weapons to deter foreign intervention and entered the atomic age. Tensions with India led to Pakistan's 1998 underground nuclear tests, making it the seventh country to possess such weapons.

Pakistan is the sole Muslim nation active in Antarctica research, maintaining its Jinnah Antarctic Research Station since 1992. The government invests heavily in information technology projects, focusing on e-government and infrastructure.

== Demographics ==
Population Density per square kilometre of each Pakistani District as of the 2017 Pakistan Census

Population of each Pakistani District as of the 2017 Pakistan Census

Pakistan had a population of 247,541,947 according to the final results of the 2023 Pakistani census. The country is characterized by a highly diverse, multi-ethnic, and multilingual society, reflecting its historical position at the crossroads of Central, South, and Western Asia, along ancient trade and invasion routes. Pakistan is the world's fifth–most populous country and has the second-largest Muslim population as of 2023. Between 1951 and 2023, Pakistan's population expanded over sevenfold, going from 33.7 million to 247.5 million. The country has a relatively high, although declining, growth rate supported by high birth rates and low death rates. Between 1998 and 2017, the average annual population growth rate stood at +2.40%.

Dramatic social changes have led to urbanization and the emergence of two megacities: Karachi and Lahore. The country's urban population more than tripled between 1981 and 2017 (from 23.8 million to 75.7 million), as Pakistan's urbanisation rate rose from 28.2% to 36.4%. Even with this, the nation's urbanisation rate remains one of the lowest in the world, and in 2017, over 130 million Pakistanis (making up nearly 65% of the population) lived in rural areas.

Due to a high fertility rate, which was estimated at 3.5 in 2022, Pakistan has one of the world's youngest populations. The 2017 census recorded that 40.3% of the country's population was under the age of 15, while only 3.7% of Pakistanis were aged 65 or more. The median age of the country was 19, while its sex ratio was recorded to be 105 males per 100 females. Pakistan ranked last (148th of 148 countries) on the Global Gender Gap Index, with a gender parity score of 56.7%, reflecting one of the lowest levels of gender equality globally.

The demographic history of Pakistan from the ancient Indus Valley civilization to the modern era includes the arrival and settlement of many cultures and ethnic groups in the modern region of Pakistan from Eurasia and the nearby Middle East. Because of this, Pakistan has a multicultural, multilinguistic, and multiethnic society. Pakistan is also thought to have the world's fourth-largest refugee population, estimated at 1.4 million in mid-2021 by the UNHCR.

=== Urbanisation ===
Since independence due to the partition of India, urbanisation has surged for various reasons. In the south, Karachi stands as the most populous commercial hub along the Indus River. In the east, west, and north, a dense population arc spans cities like Lahore, Faisalabad, Rawalpindi, Islamabad, Sargodha, Gujranwala, Sialkot, Gujrat, Jhelum, Sheikhupura, Nowshera, Mardan, and Peshawar. By 1990–2008, city dwellers constituted 36% of Pakistan's population, making it South Asia's most urbanised nation, with over 50% living in towns of 5,000+ inhabitants. Immigration, both domestic and international, significantly fuels urban growth. Migration from India, especially to Karachi, the largest metropolis, and from nearby countries, accelerates urbanisation, posing new political and socio-economic challenges. Economic shifts like the green revolution and political developments also play crucial roles.

Largest cities or towns in Pakistan According to the 2023 Census
Rank	Name	Province	Pop.	Rank	Name	Province	Pop.
1	Karachi	Sindh	18,868,021	11	Sargodha	Punjab	975,886
2	Lahore	Punjab	13,004,135	12	Sialkot	Punjab	911,817
3	Faisalabad	Punjab	3,691,999	13	Bahawalpur	Punjab	903,795
4	Rawalpindi	Punjab	3,357,612	14	Jhang	Punjab	606,533
5	Gujranwala	Punjab	2,668,047	15	Sheikhupura	Punjab	591,424
6	Multan	Punjab	2,215,381	16	Gujrat	Punjab	574,240
7	Hyderabad	Sindh	1,921,275	17	Sukkur	Sindh	563,851
8	Peshawar	Khyber Pakhtunkhwa	1,905,975	18	Larkana	Sindh	551,716
9	Quetta	Balochistan	1,565,546	19	Sahiwal	Punjab	538,344
10	Islamabad	Capital Territory	1,108,872	20	Okara	Punjab	533,693

=== Ethnicity and languages ===
Pakistan is a diverse society with estimates suggesting it has between 75 and 85 languages. Urdu and English serve as the official languages, with Urdu being the country's lingua franca and a unifying force among over 75% of Pakistanis. According to the 2023 national census, the largest languages include Punjabi (36.98%), Pashto (18.15%), Sindhi (14.31%), Saraiki (12%), Urdu (9.25%), Balochi (3.38%), Hindko (2.32%), and Brahui (1.16%). The remaining population consists of various minority languages such as Kashmiri, Khowar, Shina, Kohistani, Mewati, Hazargi, Kalasha, Burushaski and Balti. The Pakistani diaspora, numbering over seven million, is the sixth largest in the world.

=== Immigration ===
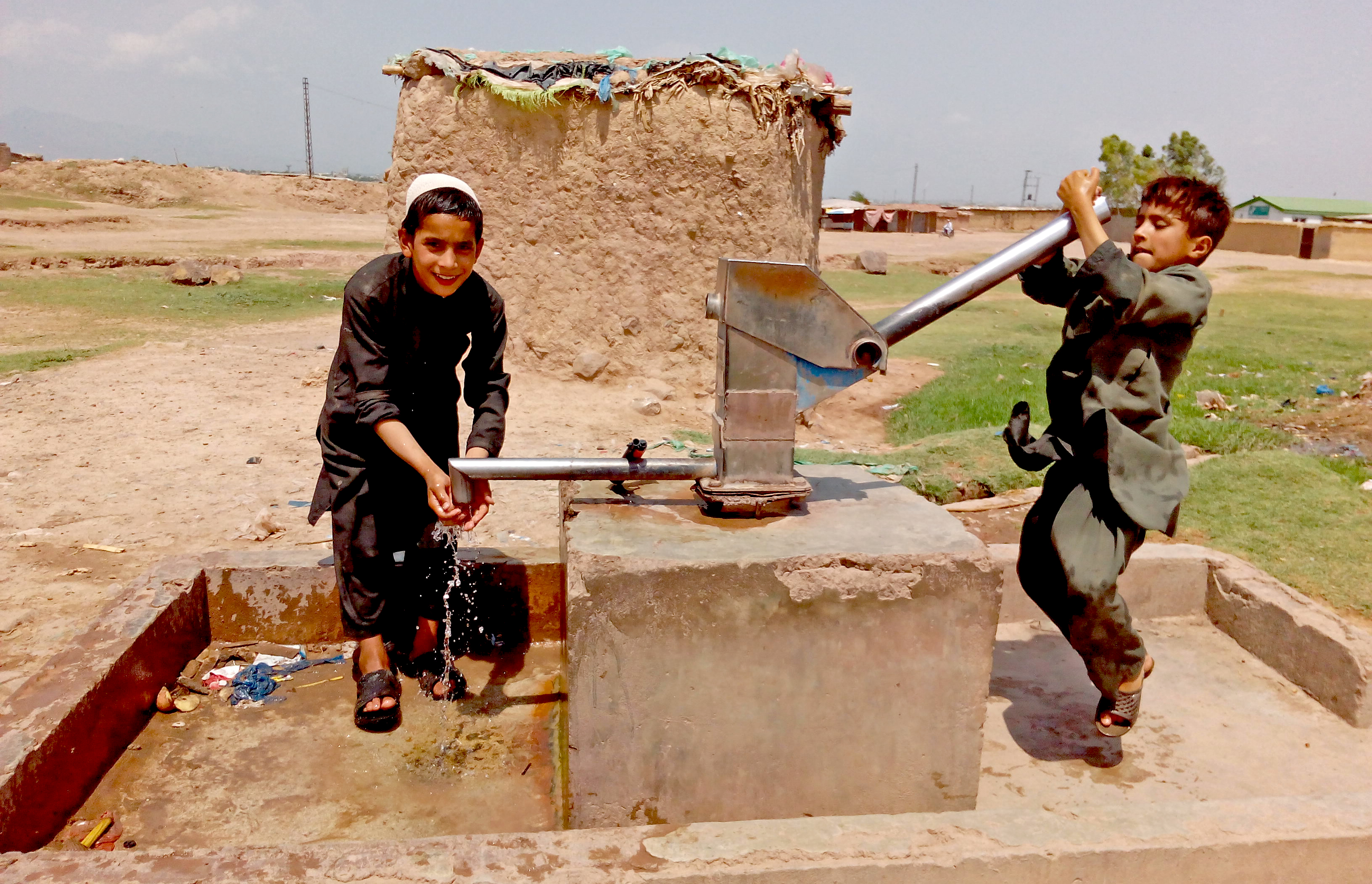
Afghan children near Islamabad fetching water from water pump. Pakistan once held the second largest refugee population globally after Turkey.

Even after the 1947 partition, the Muslims from India kept migrating to Pakistan, especially Karachi and Sindh province. Wars in neighbouring Afghanistan in the 1980s and 1990s pushed millions of Afghan refugees into Pakistan, mainly in Khyber-Pakhtunkhwa and tribal areas, with some in Karachi and Quetta. Pakistan hosts one of the world's largest refugee populations. Additionally, around 2 million Bengalis and half a million undocumented individuals, purportedly from Myanmar, reside in Pakistan. Pakistan ordered the mass expulsion of undocumented Afghans in October 2023, citing national security risks.

Migration of Bengalis and Rohingya to Pakistan started in the 1980s and continued till 1998. Karachi hosts a significant number of Bengali settlements, and large Rohingya migration made it one of their largest populations outside Myanmar. Karachi's Burmese community resides in various slums across the city.

According to BBC, thousands of Uyghur Muslims live in Gilgit-Baltistan, some left Xinjiang, China and the thriving trading town of Kashgar in 1949, while others are later arrivals, claiming to escape political oppression. Since 1989, thousands of Kashmiri Muslim refugees fled to Pakistan, alleging rape and forced displacement by Indian soldiers.

=== Diaspora ===
According to the UN Department of Economic and Social Affairs, Pakistan has the sixth-largest diaspora globally. Approximately 7 million Pakistanis reside abroad, mainly in the Middle East, Europe, and North America. Pakistan ranks 10th globally for remittances sent home. Saudi Arabia is the largest source of remittances, contributing $5.9 billion as of 2016. The term Overseas Pakistani is officially recognised by the Government of Pakistan, with the Ministry of Overseas Pakistanis and Human Resource Development addressing their needs, welfare, and issues. Overseas Pakistanis constitute the second-largest source of foreign exchange remittances to Pakistan, with remittances increasing by over 100% from US$8.9 billion in 2009–10 to US$19.9 billion in 2015–16.

=== Religion ===
Religions in Pakistan (2023 census)
Religions	Percent
Islam	96.3%
Hinduism	2.2%
Christianity	1.4%
others	0.1%

Islam is the state religion, with freedom of religion guaranteed by the constitution. The majority are Muslims (96.35%), followed by Hindus (2.17%) and Christians (1.37%). Other minorities include Sikhs, Buddhists, Jains, Zoroastrians (Parsi), and the unique Kalash people who practice animism. In 2012, 2% of the population identified as atheist in a Gallup survey.

==== Islam ====
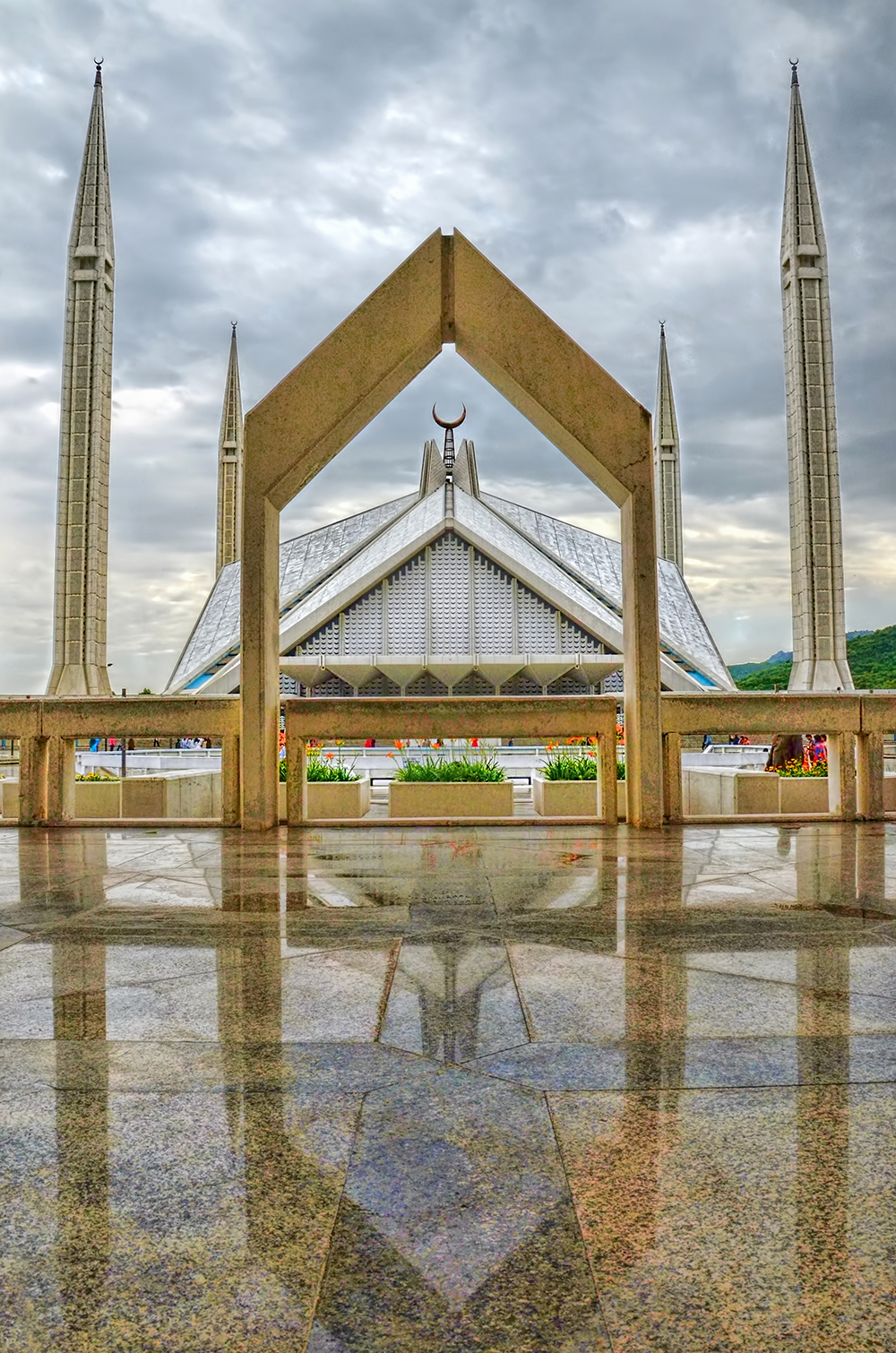
Faisal Mosque, built in 1986 by Turkish architect Vedat Dalokay on behalf of King Faisal bin Abdul-Aziz of Saudi Arabia

Islam dominates in Pakistan, with about 96.35% of the population being Muslim. Pakistan ranks second globally in Muslim population, and is home to 10.5% of the world's Muslims. Karachi is the largest Muslim city in the world.

The majority follow Sunni Islam, with a significant presence of Sufism, while Shia Muslims constitute a minority. Shias represent between 5–25%. The Shia population in Pakistan was estimated at 42 million in 2019. As of 2012, 12% of Pakistani Muslims self-identify as non-denominational Muslims.

The Ahmadis are a minority, officially considered non-Muslims. Ahmadis face persecution, banned from calling themselves Muslims since 1974.

==== Hinduism ====
Hindu proportion of each Pakistani District in 2017 according to the Pakistan Bureau of Statistics

Hinduism is the second-largest religion, followed by 2.17% of the population according to the census in 2023. Pakistan had the fifth-largest Hindu population globally in 2010. In 2023, Hindus numbered 5,217,216. (Note: This number includes population of the Hindu (Jati) and the scheduled castes.) They reside across Pakistan but are concentrated in Sindh, where they make up 8.81% of the population. Umerkot district of the province is the only Hindu majority area. Tharparkar district hosts the largest Hindu population. Four districts – Umerkot, Tharparkar, Mirpurkhas, and Sanghar – have over half of Pakistan's Hindus.

At Pakistan's inception, the 'hostage theory' suggested fair treatment of Hindus to safeguard Muslims in India. However, some Pakistani Hindus felt marginalised, leading to emigration to India. In the aftermath of the Babri Masjid demolition they faced violence.

==== Christianity and other religions ====
Christian proportion of each Pakistani District in 2017 according to the Pakistan Bureau of Statistics

Christians are the next largest religious minority after Hindus, constituting 1.37% of the population. They are concentrated in Lahore District (5%) and Islamabad Capital Territory (over 4%). Karachi hosts a historic Roman Catholic community established by Goan and Tamil migrants during British colonial rule.

Following Christianity, the Bahá'í Faith had 30,000 followers in 2008, followed by Sikhism, Buddhism, and Zoroastrianism, each with around 20,000 adherents in 2008, alongside a small Jain community.

=== Education ===
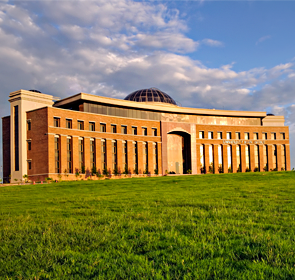
NUST in Islamabad is a top-ranked engineering university.

Pakistan's constitution mandates free primary and secondary education, with public universities established in each province, including Punjab University, Sindh University, Peshawar University, Karachi University, and Balochistan University. The country's educational landscape encompasses both public and private universities, fostering collaboration to enhance research and higher education opportunities, albeit with concerns regarding teaching quality in newer institutions. Technical and vocational institutions in Pakistan number approximately 3,193, complemented by madrassahs providing free Islamic education to students, with government efforts to regulate and monitor their quality amidst concerns over extremists recruitment. Education is divided into six main levels, including nursery, primary, middle, matriculation, intermediate, and university programs. Additionally, private schools offer a parallel secondary education system based on the curriculum set by the Cambridge International Examinations, with 439 international schools reported in Pakistan.

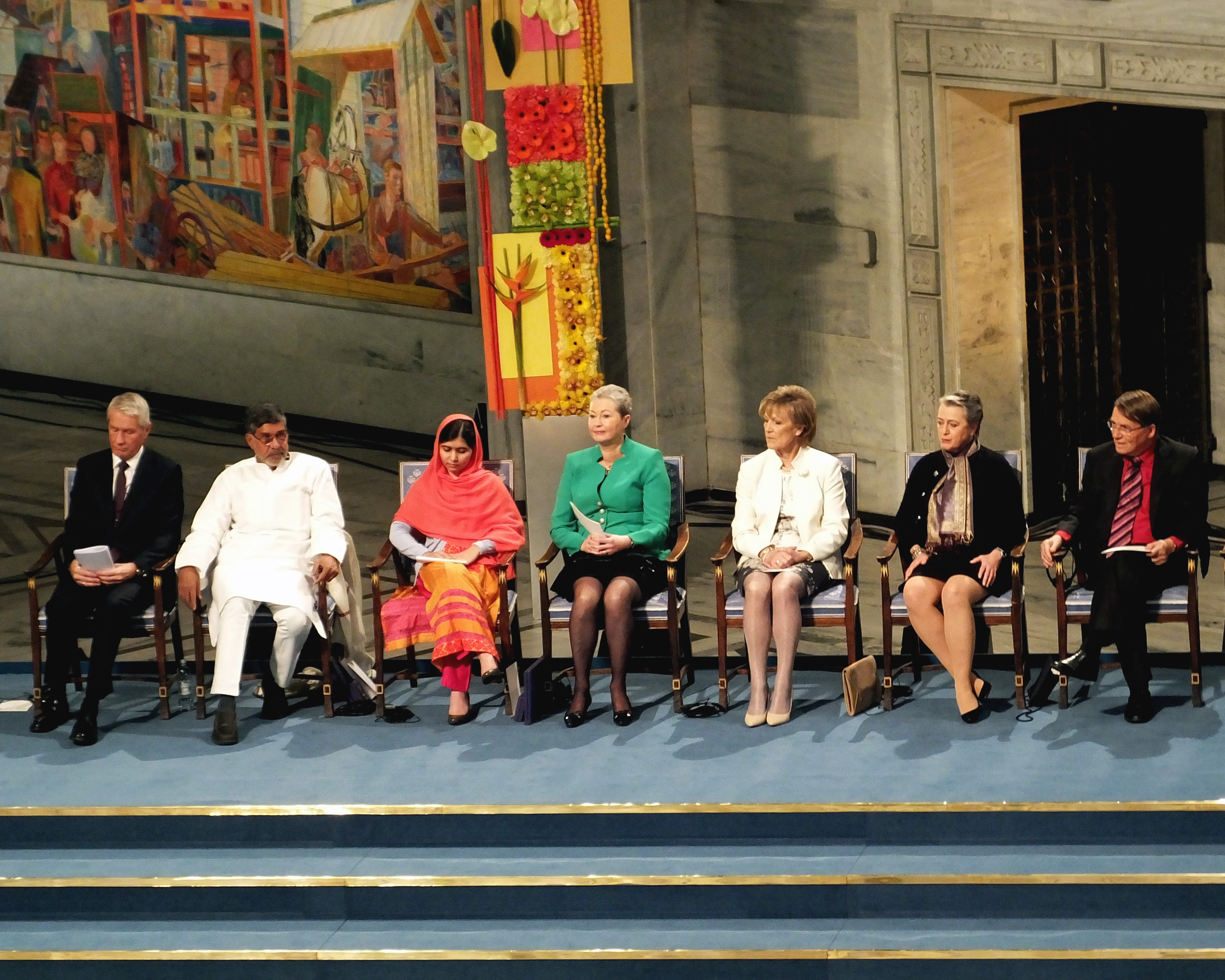
Malala Yousafzai was awarded the Nobel Peace Prize in 2014, alongside Kailash Satyarthi of India, for her advocacy of educational initiatives, particularly girls' education worldwide.

Initiatives since 2007 made English medium education mandatory nationwide. Following a 2012 attack on activist Malala Yousafzai by the Taliban, she became the youngest Nobel laureate for her education advocacy. Reforms in 2013 mandated Chinese language courses in Sindh, reflecting China's growing influence. As of 2018, Pakistan's literacy rate stands at 62.3%, with significant regional and gender disparities. Government initiatives, including computer literacy since 1995, aim to eradicate illiteracy, targeting 100% enrollment among primary school-age children and an ~86% literacy rate by 2015. Pakistan allocates 2.3% of its GDP to education, among the lowest in South Asia.

== Culture ==
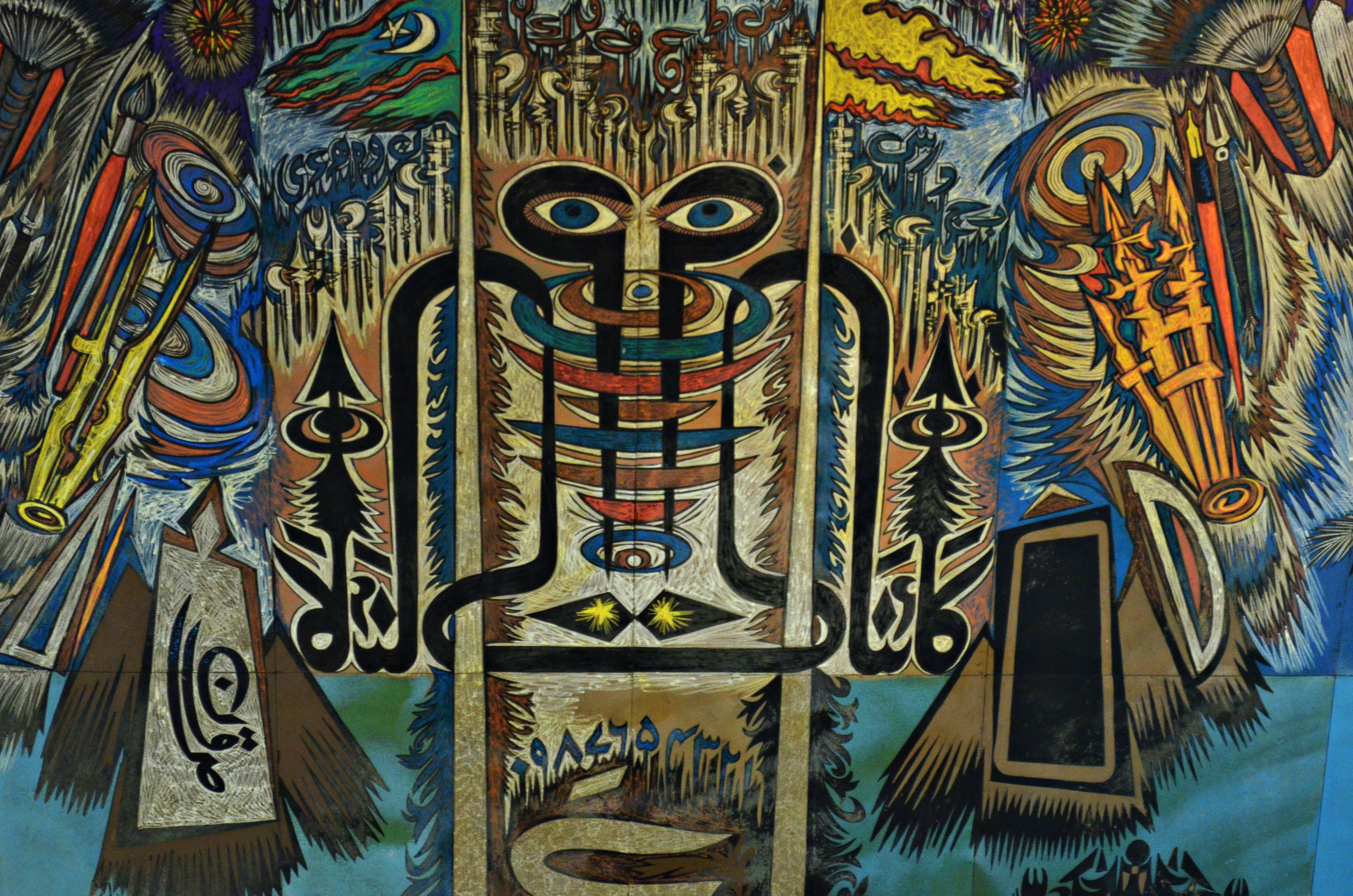
Artwork by Sadequain on the ceiling of Frere Hall. Having painted around 15,000 paintings, Sadequain is considered one of the finest painters and calligraphers Pakistan has ever produced.

Civil society in Pakistan is hierarchical, emphasising local cultural etiquette and traditional Islamic values. The primary family unit is the extended family, but there's a rising trend towards nuclear families due to socio-economic factors. Both men and women typically wear Shalwar Kameez; men also favour trousers, jeans, and shirts. The middle class has grown to about 35 million, with another 17 million in the upper and upper-middle classes, leading to a shift in power from rural landowners to urban elites. Festivals like Eid ul-Fitr, Eid ul-Azha, Ramadan, Christmas, Easter, Holi, and Diwali are primarily religious. Pakistan ranked 56th on the 2006 A.T. Kearney/FP Globalization Index due to increasing globalisation.

=== Architecture ===
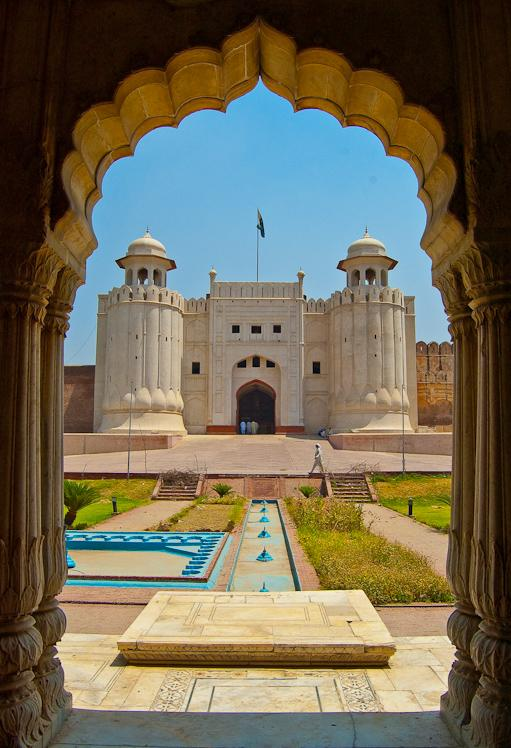
The Lahore Fort, a landmark built during the Mughal era, is a UNESCO World Heritage Site.

Four periods define Pakistani architecture: pre-Islamic, Islamic, colonial, and post-colonial. The onset of the Indus civilisation around the mid-3rd millennium BCE heralded an urban culture, evidenced by surviving large structures. Notable pre-Islamic settlements include Mohenjo-daro, Harappa, and Kot Diji. The fusion of Buddhism and Greek influences birthed a distinctive Greco-Buddhist style from the 1st century CE, exemplified by the renowned Gandhara style. Notable Buddhist architectural remnants include the Takht-i-Bahi monastery in Khyber Pakhtunkhwa.

The advent of Islam in present-day Pakistan marked the cessation of Buddhist architecture, ushering in Islamic architecture. The notable Indo-Islamic structure, the tomb of Shah Rukn-i-Alam in Multan, remains significant. During the Mughal era, Persian-Islamic design merged with Hindustani art, seen in Lahore's architectural gems like the Badshahi Mosque and the Lahore Fort with the iconic Alamgiri Gate. Lahore also boasts the vibrant Wazir Khan Mosque, and the lush Shalimar Gardens. In the British colonial period, Indo-European buildings emerged, blending European and Indian-Islamic styles. Post-colonial identity shines through modern landmarks like the Faisal Mosque, Minar-e-Pakistan, and Mazar-e-Quaid. British architectural influence persists in structures across Lahore, Peshawar, and Karachi.

=== Clothing, arts, and fashion ===
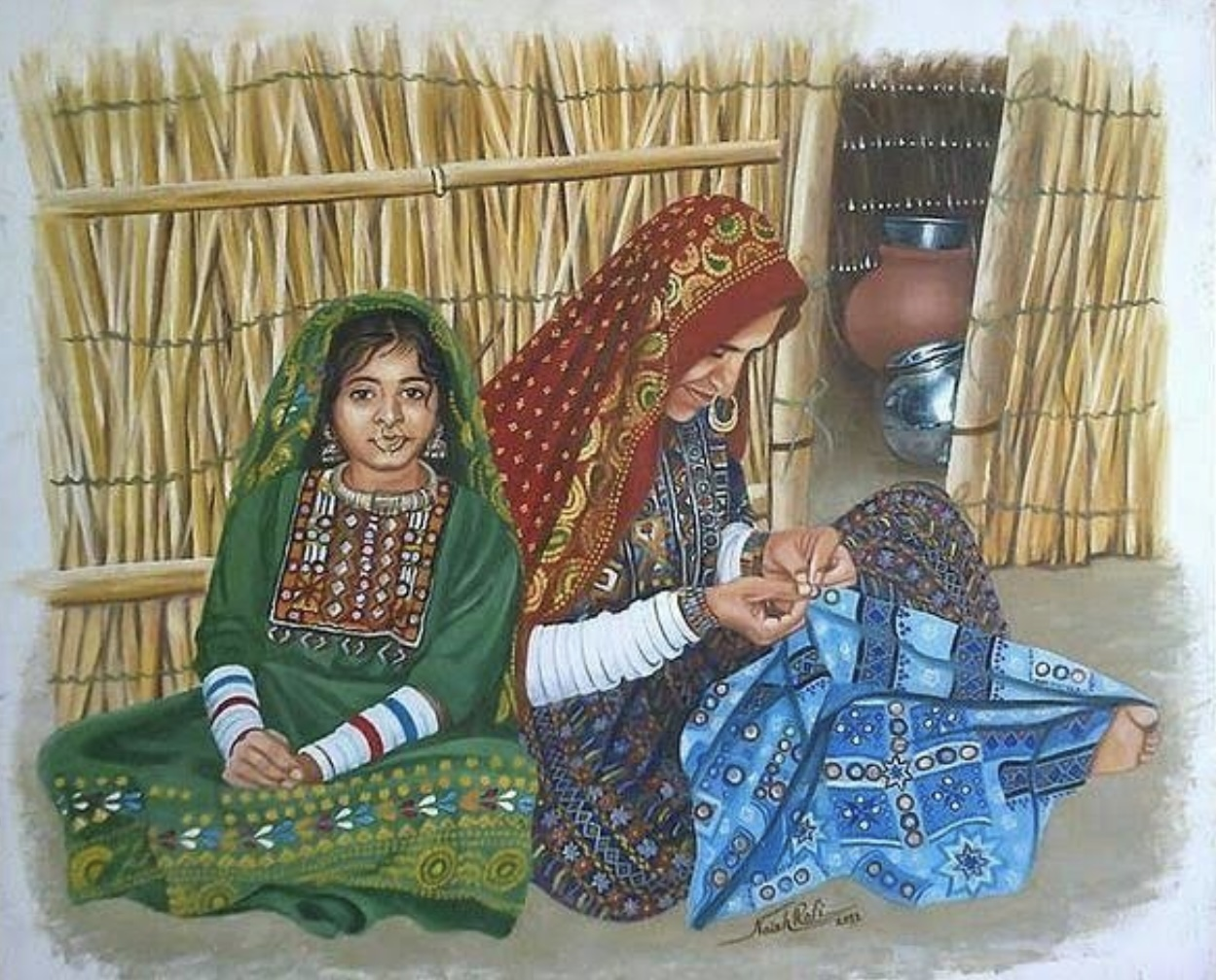
A depiction of traditional clothing of women from Sindh

The Shalwar kameez is Pakistan's national dress, worn in all provinces: Punjab, Sindh, Balochistan, Khyber Pakhtunkhwa, and Azad Kashmir. Each province has its own style. Pakistanis wear a variety of fabrics like silk, chiffon, and cotton. In addition to the national dress, men often wear domestically tailored suits and neckties, especially in offices, schools, and social gatherings.

Pakistan's fashion industry has thrived, blending traditional and modern styles to create a unique cultural identity. Regional and traditional dress remain significant symbols of native tradition, evolving into both modern and purer forms. Organisations like the Pakistan Fashion Design Council in Lahore and the Fashion Pakistan Council in Karachi host events like PFDC Fashion Week and Fashion Pakistan Week. Pakistan's inaugural fashion week took place in November 2009.

=== Literature and philosophy ===
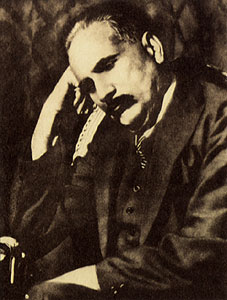
Muhammad Iqbal, Pakistan's national poet who conceived the idea of Pakistan

Pakistan boasts literature in various languages including Urdu, Sindhi, Punjabi, Pashto, Baluchi, Persian, English, and more. The Pakistan Academy of Letters actively promotes literature and poetry both domestically and internationally. National Library contributes to literary dissemination. Historically, Pakistani literature consisted mainly of lyric, religious, and folkloric works, later diversifying under colonial influence into prose fiction, now widely embraced.

The national poet of Pakistan, Muhammad Iqbal, wrote influential poetry in Urdu and Persian, advocating for Islamic civilisational revival. Notable figures in contemporary Urdu literature include Josh Malihabadi, Faiz Ahmed Faiz, and Saadat Hasan Manto. Popular Sufi poets like Shah Abdul Latif and Bulleh Shah are revered. Mirza Kalich Beg is hailed as the father of modern Sindhi prose. Pakistani philosophy has been shaped by influences from British and American philosophy, with notable figures like M. M. Sharif contributing to its development. After 1971, Marxist thought gained prominence in Pakistani philosophy through figures like Jalaludin Abdur Rahim.

=== Media and entertainment ===
The private print media, state-owned Pakistan Television Corporation (PTV), and Pakistan Broadcasting Corporation (PBC) dominated media until the 21st century. Pakistan now boasts a vast network of domestic, privately owned 24-hour electronic news media and cable television channels. The Reporters Without Borders has indicated pressure faced by Pakistani reporters, particularly when reporting against the military or government. The BBC describes Pakistani media as "among the most outspoken in South Asia". Pakistani media has been instrumental in exposing corruption. In 2025, Pakistan ranked 158 out of 180 countries in the Press Freedom Index by Reporters Without Borders, highlighting restrictions on freedom of the press. According to the journalist Raza Rumi, in 2023, TV channels in Pakistan faced suspensions and legal threats for airing content critical of the government or military, while online platforms also experienced temporary takedowns. According to a 2025 report, some newspapers have faced financial pressure—such as withdrawal of government advertisements—for publishing content critical of government policies. Both military and civilian governments have historically used such tactics. Freedom House rated Pakistan's Internet freedom as "Not Free" in 2024.

The Lollywood, Punjabi, and Pashto film industry is centered in Karachi, Lahore, and Peshawar. Although Bollywood films were banned from public cinemas from 1965 to 2008, they remained influential in Pakistani popular culture. However, in 2019, the screening of Bollywood movies faced an indefinite ban. Despite challenges faced by the Pakistani film industry, Urdu televised dramas and theatrical performances remain popular, frequently broadcast by many entertainment media outlets. Urdu dramas dominate the television entertainment industry, renowned for their quality since the 1990s. Pakistani music encompasses diverse forms, from provincial folk music and traditional styles like Qawwali and Ghazal Gayaki to modern fusions of traditional and western music. Pakistan boasts numerous renowned folk singers, and the arrival of Afghan refugees in western provinces has sparked interest in Pashto music, despite occasional intolerance.

=== Cuisine ===
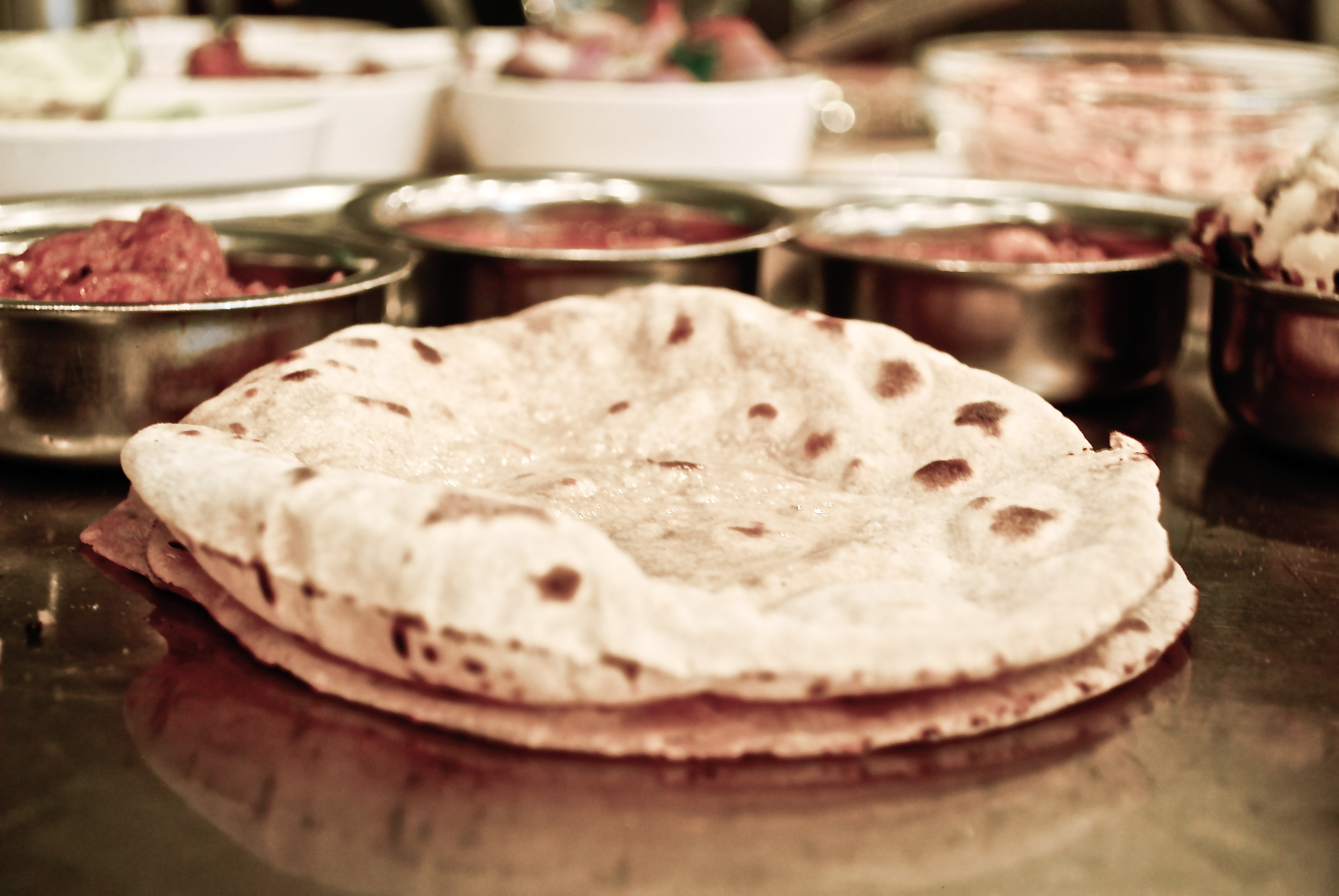
Roti, served with various side dishes, is considered a staple food in Pakistan.

Pakistani cuisine, rooted in the royal kitchens of 16th-century Mughal emperors, blends influences from British, Indian, Central Asian, and Middle Eastern culinary traditions. Unlike Middle Eastern fare, Pakistani dishes are heavily spiced with garlic, ginger, turmeric, chilli, and garam masala. Roti, a wheat-based flatbread, accompanies most meals, alongside curry, meat, vegetables, and lentils. Rice is also common, served plain, spiced, or in sweet dishes. Lassi, a traditional drink from the Punjab region, and black tea with milk and sugar are popular beverages enjoyed nationwide. Sohan halwa, a beloved sweet dish from southern Punjab, is savoured across Pakistan.

=== Sports ===
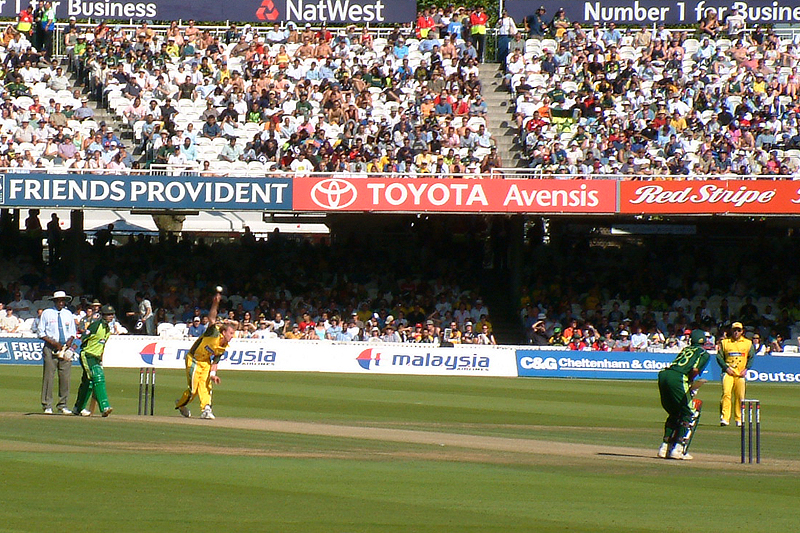
A cricket match between Pakistan and Australia at Lord's

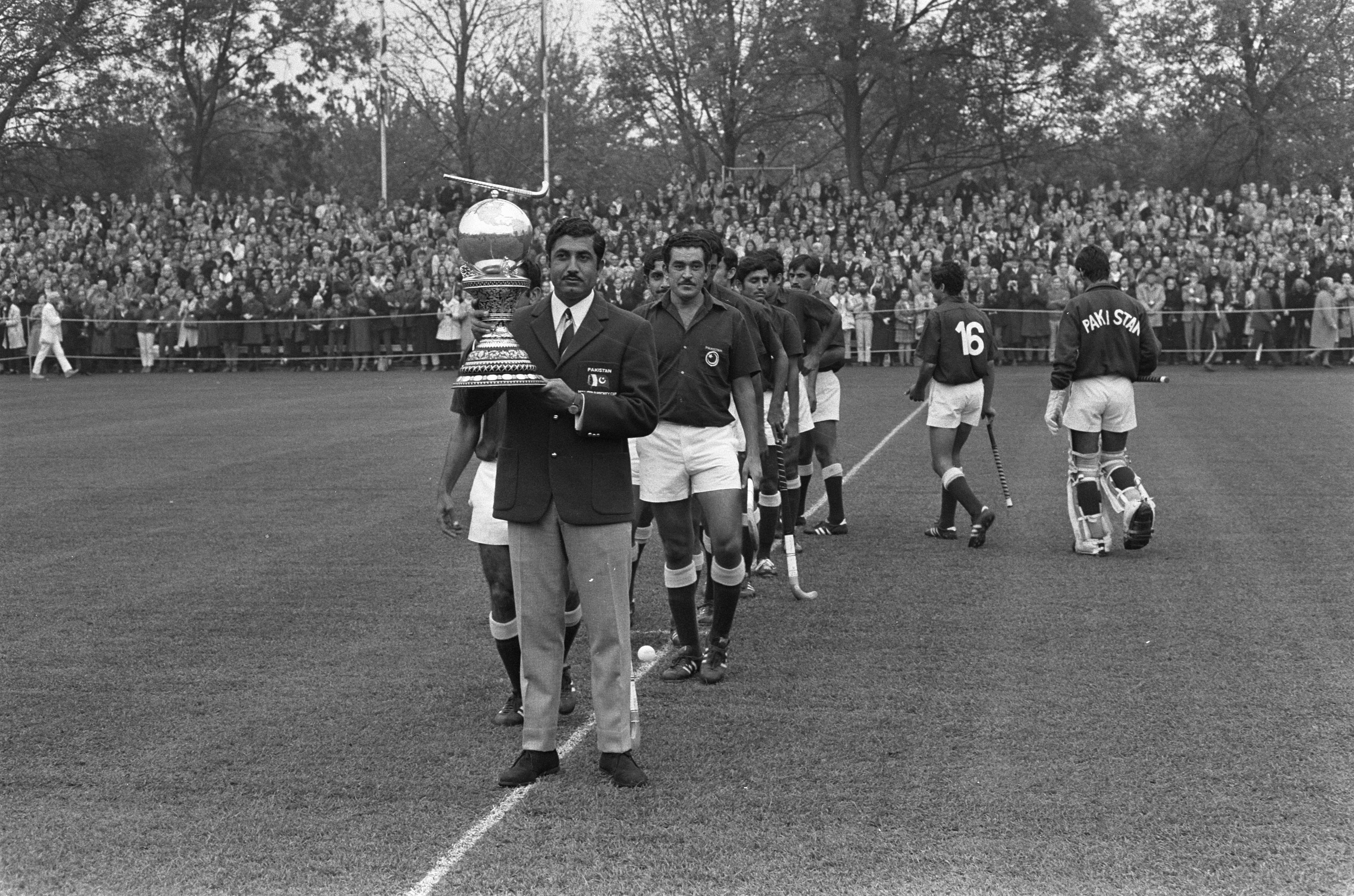
The Pakistan national hockey team with the 1971 Hockey World Cup trophy

Cricket is the most popular sport in Pakistan, followed by football. Field hockey is the national sport. Other sports like squash, polo, and traditional games are also enjoyed.

In cricket, Pakistan holds victories in all major ICC tournaments, including the ICC Cricket World Cup, ICC World Twenty20, and ICC Champions Trophy. The Pakistan Super League ranks among the top T20 leagues globally.

In football, Pakistan established the Pakistan Football Federation soon after its creation, and it is known for producing FIFA World Cup balls.

In field hockey, Pakistan holds four Hockey World Cup wins, eight Asian Games gold medals, and three Olympic gold medals. Squash player Jahangir Khan holds the record for the longest winning streak in professional sport history, winning 555 consecutive matches. Pakistan has hosted various international events, including Cricket and Hockey World Cups and Asian Games.

== See also ==
- Outline of Pakistan
- Government of Pakistan
- Administrative units of Pakistan

== Bibliography ==
=== Overview ===
- Ayres, Alyssa (23 July 2009). Speaking Like a State: Language and Nationalism in Pakistan. Cambridge University Press. p. 38. ISBN 978-0-521-51931-1.
- Badian, Ernst (1987). "Alexander at Peucelaotis". The Classical Quarterly. 37 (1): 117–128. doi:10.1017/S0009838800031712. JSTOR 639350. S2CID 246878679.
- Baqir, Fayyaz (6 August 2018). Poverty Alleviation and Poverty of Aid: Pakistan. Taylor & Francis. ISBN 978-0-429-87153-5.
- Bhandari, Medani P. (September 2022). Getting the Climate Science Facts Right: The Role of the IPCC. River Publishers. ISBN 978-1-000-79720-6.
- Copland, Ian (2001). India, 1885–1947: The Unmaking of an Empire. Seminar Studies in History. Longman. ISBN 978-0-582-38173-5.
- Cornwall, Andrea; Edwards, Jenny, eds. (13 March 2014). Feminisms, Empowerment and Development: Changing Women's Lives. Zed Books. ISBN 978-1-78032-586-6.
- Eberhard, David M.; Simons, Gary F.; Fennig, Charles D., eds. (2022). "Pakistan". Ethnologue: Languages of the World (25 ed.). Dallas, Texas: SIL International. Archived from the original on 9 March 2023.
- Haleem, Safia (May 2013). "1, 7". Pakistan – Culture Smart!: The Essential Guide to Customs & Culture. Kuperard. ISBN 978-1-85733-678-8.
- James, Orpha (22 December 2022). Faith Restored: "A Pakistani Women's Journey from Land of Islam to a Nation Under God' a Christian Perspective. WestBow Press. ISBN 978-1-6642-8702-0.
- Mathew Joseph C. (2016). Understanding Pakistan: Emerging Voices from India. Taylor & Francis. p. 337. ISBN 978-1-351-99725-6. OCLC 958566633.
- Metcalf, Barbara D.; Metcalf, Thomas R. (2006). A Concise History of Modern India. Cambridge University Press. p. 221. ISBN 978-1-139-45887-0.
- Minahan, James (2009). The Complete Guide to National Symbols and Emblems [2 volumes]. ABC-CLIO. p. 141. ISBN 978-0-313-34497-8.
- Rais, Rasul Bakhsh (30 August 2017). Imagining Pakistan: Modernism, State, and the Politics of Islamic Revival. Lexington Books. p. 191. ISBN 978-1-4985-5396-4.
- SATP (2024). "Pakistan: Assessment-2024". South Asian Terrorism Portal.
- Spuler, Bertold (1969). The Muslim World: a Historical Survey. Leiden, Netherlands: E.J. Brill. ISBN 978-90-04-02104-4.
- Talbot, Ian (2016). A History of Modern South Asia: Politics, States, Diasporas. Yale University Press. pp. 227–240. ISBN 978-0-300-21659-2.
- Wright, Rita P. (26 October 2009). The Ancient Indus: Urbanism, Economy, and Society. Cambridge University Press. pp. 1–2. ISBN 978-0-521-57219-4.
- Wynbrandt, James (2009). A Brief History of Pakistan. Infobase Publishing. ISBN 978-0-8160-6184-6.
- Zia, Nadeem; Burton, Bruce (24 October 2023). Corporate Governance Challenges in Pakistan: Perceptions and Potential Routes Forward. De Gruyter. ISBN 978-3-11-077306-4.

=== Etymology ===
- Anand, Sugam (1991). Modern Indian Historiography: From Pillai to Azad. MG Publishers. p. 178. ISBN 978-81-85532-09-7.
- Aziz, Khursheed Kamal (1987). Rahmat Ali: A Biography. Vanguard. p. 88. ISBN 978-3-515-05051-7.
- Lahiri, Ashok (23 January 2023). India in Search of Glory: Political Calculus and Economy. Penguin Random House India Private Limited. ISBN 978-93-5492-837-6.
- Saqib, Muhammad Amjad; Malik, Aneeqa (21 September 2018). Integral Finance – Akhuwat: A Case Study of the Solidarity Economy. Taylor & Francis. ISBN 978-1-351-72767-9.
- Tummala, Krishna K. (1996). Public Administration in India. Allied Publishers (P) Limited. p. 42. ISBN 978-81-7023-590-3.

=== History ===
- Abid, Maryam (2023). Jamaat-e-Islami's influence on the Muslim Identity of Pakistanis through legislative amendments and their social consequences (Master of Arts thesis). Lawrence, Kansas: University of Kansas. Archived from the original on 24 August 2025.
- Abraham, Taisha (2002). Women and the Politics of Violence. Har-Anand Publications. p. 131. ISBN 978-81-241-0847-5.
- Afzal, Madiha (29 February 2024). "Pakistan's surprising and marred 2024 election, and what comes next". Brookings Institution.
- Ahmad, Samir (23 November 2023). Track Two Diplomacy Between India and Pakistan: Peace Negotiations and Initiatives. Taylor & Francis. ISBN 978-1-000-99914-3.
- Ahmed, Akbar S. (1997). Jinnah, Pakistan and Islamic Identity: The Search for Saladin. Psychology Press. p. 136. ISBN 978-0-415-14966-2.
- Akbar, M. J. (8 February 2018). India: The Siege Within. Roli Books. ISBN 978-81-936009-7-9.
- Allchin, Bridget; Allchin, Raymond (1982). The Rise of Civilization in India and Pakistan. Cambridge University Press. p. 131. ISBN 978-0-521-28550-6.
- Allchin, Bridget; Petraglia, Michael D., eds. (22 May 2007). The Evolution and History of Human Populations in South Asia: Inter-disciplinary Studies in Archaeology, Biological Anthropology, Linguistics and Genetics. Springer Netherlands. p. 5. ISBN 978-1-4020-5562-1.
- Banerjee, Kanchan (20 May 2022). The Crash Of A Civilization. Prabhat Prakashan. ISBN 978-93-5521-240-5.
- Basrur, Rajesh M. (2008). South Asia's Cold War: Nuclear Weapons and Conflict in Comparative Perspective. Routledge. p. 36. ISBN 978-1-134-16531-5.
- Basu, Dipak; Miroshnik, Victoria (16 August 2017). India as an Organization: Volume One: A Strategic Risk Analysis of Ideals, Heritage and Vision · Volume 1. Springer International Publishing. p. 158. ISBN 978-3-319-53371-1.
- Basu, Dipak; Miroshnik, Victoria W. (9 January 2023). How Pakistan Was Formed: The Economic Rationale for Partition. Lexington Books. p. 125. ISBN 978-1-6669-1745-1.
- Beachler, Donald W. (14 August 2011). The Genocide Debate: Politicians, Academics, and Victims. Palgrave Macmillan. p. 16. ISBN 978-0-230-33763-3.
- Behrendt, Kurt A. (November 2003). The Buddhist Architecture of Gandhāra. Brill Publishers. p. 39. ISBN 978-90-474-1257-1.
- Behrendt, Kurt A. (2007). The Art of Gandhara in the Metropolitan Museum of Art. New York City: Metropolitan Museum of Art. pp. 4–5, 91. ISBN 978-1-58839-224-4.
- Bhaumik, Subir (1996). Insurgent Crossfire: North-East India. Lancer Publishers. p. 6. ISBN 978-1-897829-12-7.
- Bose, Sarmila (2005). "Anatomy of Violence: Analysis of Civil War in East Pakistan in 1971". Economic and Political Weekly. 40 (41): 4463–4471. ISSN 2349-8846. JSTOR 4417267.
- Brass, Paul R. (2003). "The partition of India and retributive genocide in the Punjab, 1946–47: means, methods, and purposes" (PDF). Journal of Genocide Research. 5 (1). Taylor and Francis: 81–82. doi:10.1080/14623520305657. Archived from the original (PDF) on 14 April 2015.
- Burnett, M. Troy, ed. (4 August 2020). Nationalism Today: Extreme Political Movements Around the World [2 Volumes]. ABC-CLIO. p. 566. ISBN 978-1-4408-5000-4.
- Burrison, John A. (16 June 2017). Global Clay: Themes in World Ceramic Traditions. Indiana University Press. p. 110. ISBN 978-0-253-03189-1.
- Busch, Nathan E. (17 October 2014). No End in Sight: The Continuing Menace of Nuclear Proliferation. University Press of Kentucky. p. 184. ISBN 978-0-8131-5662-0.
- Butalia, Urvashi (2000). The Other Side of Silence: Voices From the Partition of British India. Duke University Press. ISBN 978-0-8223-2494-2.
- Cavendish, Marshall (September 2006). World and Its Peoples: Volume 1. Marshall Cavendish Corporation. ISBN 978-0-7614-7571-2.
- Central Intelligence Agency (20 June 2023). The CIA World Factbook 2023-2024. Skyhorse Publishing. ISBN 978-1-5107-7593-0.
- Chakma, Bhumitra (17 December 2014). South Asia's Nuclear Security. Taylor & Francis. ISBN 978-1-317-58688-3.
- Chandra, Anjana Motihar (15 July 2008). India Condensed. Marshall Cavendish. p. 71. ISBN 978-981-261-975-4.
- Chandra, Satish (2005). Medieval India: From Sultanat to the Mughals Part II. Har-Anand Publications. p. 365. ISBN 978-81-241-1066-9.
- Chapman, Graham P. (6 February 2018). The Geopolitics of South Asia: From Early Empires to India, Pakistan and Bangladesh. Taylor & Francis. ISBN 978-1-351-73468-4.
- Chowdhury, Anis; Mahmud, Wahiduddin (2008). Handbook on the South Asian economies. Edward Elgar Publishing. pp. 72–75. ISBN 978-1-84376-988-0.
- Cohen, Stephen Philip (2004). The idea of Pakistan (1st pbk. ed.). Washington, DC: Brookings Institution Press. ISBN 978-0-8157-9761-6.
- Coll, Steve (2004). Ghost Wars: The Secret History of the CIA, Afghanistan, and Bin Laden, from the Soviet Invasion to September 10, 2001 (23 February 2004 ed.). Penguin Press HC. p. 720. ISBN 978-1-59420-007-6.
- Coningham, Robin; Young, Ruth (31 August 2015). The Archaeology of South Asia: From the Indus to Asoka, c. 6500 BCE – 200 CE. Cambridge University Press. p. 138. ISBN 978-0-521-84697-4.
- Consiglio, Cyprian (7 January 2015). Spirit, Soul, Body: Toward an Integral Christian Spirituality. Liturgical Press. p. 27. ISBN 978-0-8146-3582-7.
- Cook, Hugh C. B. (1975). The Sikh Wars: The British Army in the Punjab, 1845-1849. L. Cooper. ISBN 978-0-85052-164-1.
- Daiya, Kavita (2011). Violent Belongings: Partition, Gender, and National Culture in Postcolonial India. Temple University Press. p. 75. ISBN 978-1-59213-744-2.
- Dales, George; Kenoyer, Jonathan Mark; Alcock, Leslie (1986). Excavations at Mohenjo Daro, Pakistan: The Pottery, with an Account of the Pottery from the 1950 Excavations of Sir Mortimer Wheeler. UPenn Museum of Archaeology. p. 4. ISBN 978-0-934718-52-3.
- Dandamaev, M. A. (20 October 2023). A Political History of the Achaemenid Empire. Brill. p. 147. ISBN 978-90-04-66763-1.
- D'Costa, Bina (2011). Nationbuilding, Gender and War Crimes in South Asia. Routledge. p. 53. ISBN 978-0-415-56566-0.
- Dede, Kadir; Sadioglu, Ugur, eds. (20 June 2016). Comparative Studies and Regionally-Focused Cases Examining Local Governments. IGI Global. p. 270. ISBN 978-1-5225-0321-7.
- Dyson, Tim (2018). A Population History of India: From the First Modern People to the Present Day. Oxford University Press. p. 29. ISBN 978-0-19-882905-8.
- Fair, C. Christine (2014). Fighting to the End: The Pakistan Army's Way of War. Oxford University Press. p. 78. ISBN 978-0-19-989270-9.
- Faroqhi, Suraiya (8 August 2019). The Ottoman and Mughal Empires Social History in the Early Modern World. Bloomsbury Publishing. ISBN 978-1-78831-872-3.
- Fisher, Michael H. (2018). An Environmental History of India: From Earliest Times to the Twenty-First Century. Cambridge University Press. p. 33. ISBN 978-1-107-11162-2.
- Fitzpatrick, Mark (2007). Nuclear Black Markets: Pakistan, A.Q. Khan and the Rise of Proliferation Networks : a Net Assessment. International Institute for Strategic Studies. pp. 115–116. ISBN 978-0-86079-201-7.
- Flood, Gavin, ed. (23 May 2022). The Wiley Blackwell Companion to Hinduism. Wiley. p. 421. ISBN 978-1-119-14486-1.
- Gayer, Laurent (2014). Karachi: Ordered Disorder and the Struggle for the City. Oxford University Press. p. 42. ISBN 978-0-19-935444-3.
- Gwillim Law (1999). Administrative Subdivisions of Countries: A Comprehensive World Reference, 1900 Through 1998. McFarland, Incorporated, Publishers. p. 276. ISBN 978-1-4766-0447-3.
- Hajari, Nisid (9 June 2015). Midnight's Furies: The Deadly Legacy of India's Partition. Houghton Mifflin Harcourt. ISBN 978-0-547-66924-3.
- Hakeem, Abdul (2 June 2014). Paradise on Fire: Syed Ali Geelani and the Struggle for Freedom in Kashmir. Kube Publishing Limited. ISBN 978-0-9536768-6-6.
- Hali, Khvajah Altaf Husain; Akhtar, Saleem (1993). Ḥayāt-i jāved. Lāhore: Sang-i Mīl Publications. ISBN 978-969-35-0186-5.
- Hardy, Peter (7 December 1972). The Muslims of British India. Cambridge University Press. p. 213. ISBN 978-0-521-08488-8.
- Harjani, Dayal N. (19 July 2018). Sindhi Roots & Rituals - Part 1. Notion Press. ISBN 978-1-64249-289-7.
- Haroon, Sana (2008). "The Rise of Deobandi Islam in the North-West Frontier Province and Its Implications in Colonial India and Pakistan 1914–1996". Journal of the Royal Asiatic Society. 18 (1). Cambridge University Press: 66–67. doi:10.1017/S1356186307007778. JSTOR 27755911. S2CID 154959326.
- Hasan, Arif; Raza, Mansoor (2009). Migration and Small Towns in Pakistan. Human Settlements Programme, International Institute for Environment and Development. pp. 10–12. ISBN 978-1-84369-734-3.
- Hiro, Dilip (2015). The Longest August: The Unflinching Rivalry Between India and Pakistan. Nation Books. p. 216. ISBN 978-1-56858-503-1.
- Holt, Andrew; Curta, Florin, eds. (28 November 2016). Great Events in Religion: An Encyclopedia of Pivotal Events in Religious History [3 Volumes]. Bloomsbury Publishing. ISBN 979-8-216-09187-5.
- Hoodbhoy, Pervez (23 January 2011). "Pakistan's nuclear bayonet". The Herald. Archived from the original on 18 February 2011.
- Hoodbhoy, Pervez (2023). Pakistan: Origins, Identity and Future. Taylor & Francis. ISBN 978-1-000-85667-5.
- Husain, Ishrat (25 March 2010). "The Role of Politics in Pakistan's Economy". Journal of International Affairs. 63 (1). Columbia University: 1–18. ISSN 0022-197X. JSTOR 24384169.
- Hussain, Adeel (8 November 2018). "Muhammad Iqbal's constitutionalism". Indian Law Review. 2 (2). Taylor & Francis: 135–158. doi:10.1080/24730580.2018.1544023. hdl:1887/79342. ISSN 2473-0599.
- Hussain, Rizwan (2008). "Pakistan". The Oxford Encyclopedia of the Islamic World. Archived from the original on 21 November 2008.
- Hussain, Shafqat (2015). Remoteness and Modernity: Transformation and Continuity in Northern Pakistan. Yale University Press. p. 112. ISBN 978-0-300-20555-8.
- Isaacs, Harold Robert (1975). Idols of the Tribe: Group Identity and Political Change. Harvard University Press. p. 3. ISBN 978-0-674-44315-0.
- Jaffrelot, Christophe (2015). The Pakistan Paradox: Instability and Resilience. Oxford University Press. ISBN 978-0-19-023518-5.
- Junejo, Rabela (August 2020). Architectural Encounters at Makli Necropolis (14th–18th Centuries) (PDF). History of Architecture (Doctor of Philosophy thesis). Middle East Technical University. pp. iv, 2. Archived from the original (PDF) on 30 August 2025.
- Kapoor, Deepak (2009). Pentagon's South Asia Defence and Strategic Year Book 2009. Pentagon Press. p. 3. ISBN 978-81-8274-399-1.
- Kathpalia, Pran Nath (1986). Mission with a Difference: The Exploits of 71 Mountain Brigade. Lancer International. p. 17. ISBN 978-81-7062-069-3.
- Kazmi, Muhammad Raza (2003). Liaquat Ali Khan: His Life and Work. Oxford University Press. ISBN 978-0-19-579788-6.
- Kennedy, Kerry J., ed. (22 July 2021). Social Studies Education in South and South East Asian Contexts. Taylor & Francis. ISBN 978-1-000-39426-9.
- Khan, Asghar (23 August 2022). Mainstreaming the Tribal Areas (ex-FATA) of Pakistan Bordering Afghanistan: Challenges and Prospects. Springer Nature Singapore. pp. 114, 119. ISBN 978-981-19-1794-3.
- Khan, Feroz (7 November 2012). Eating Grass: The Making of the Pakistani Bomb. Stanford University Press. ISBN 978-0-8047-8480-1.
- Khan, Gohar Ayub (29 August 2008). Glimpses Into the Corridors of Power. Oxford University Press. p. 184. ISBN 978-0-19-547354-4.
- Khan, M. H. (September 2016). Memoir of M. H. Khan: Turbulence in the Indian Subcontinent. Mereo Books. p. 17. ISBN 978-1-86151-569-8.
- Khanna, Sushil (April 2002). "The Crisis in the Pakistan Economy". Revolutionary Democracy. 8 (1).
- Khan, Naveeda (22 May 2012). Muslim Becoming: Aspiration and Skepticism in Pakistan. Duke University Press. p. 58. ISBN 978-0-8223-5231-0.
- Khoja-Moolji, Shenila (15 June 2021). Sovereign Attachments: Masculinity, Muslimness, and Affective Politics in Pakistan. University of California Press. p. 32. ISBN 978-0-520-97439-5.
- Koumar, Shaupaun (16 January 2023). Naturocracy. Zorba Books. ISBN 978-93-952172-0-0.
- Krasno, Jean; LaPides, Sean (7 July 2015). Personality, Political Leadership, and Decision Making: A Global Perspective. Bloomsbury Publishing. ISBN 979-8-216-12791-8.
- Kubica, Olga (14 April 2023). Greco-Buddhist Relations in the Hellenistic Far East: Sources and Contexts. Taylor & Francis. p. 153. ISBN 978-1-000-86852-4.
- Kulke, Hermann; Rothermund, Dietmar (27 May 2016). A History of India. Taylor & Francis. ISBN 978-1-317-24212-3.
- Kumarasingham, Harshan (2013). "The 'Tropical Dominions': The Appeal of Dominion Status in the Decolonisation of India, Pakistan, and Ceylon, vol. 23". Transactions of the Royal Historical Society. 23. Cambridge University Press: 223–245. doi:10.1017/S0080440113000108. JSTOR 23726109.
- Lapidus, Ira M. (13 October 2014). A History of Islamic Societies. Cambridge University Press. p. 274. ISBN 978-0-521-73297-0.
- Lapierre, Dominique; Collins, Larry, eds. (2015). Mountbatten and the Partition of India. Wide Canvas. p. 57. ISBN 978-93-259-8601-5.
- Lewis, David (2011). Bangladesh. Cambridge University Press. p. 70. ISBN 978-0-521-71377-1.
- MacDonald, Myra (2017). Defeat is an Orphan: How Pakistan Lost the Great South Asian War. C. Hurst & Co. p. 85. ISBN 978-1-84904-858-3.
- Malik, Iftikhar Haider (2006). Culture and Customs of Pakistan. Greenwood Publishing Group. ISBN 978-0-313-33126-8.
- Mansbach, Richard W.; Pirro, Ellen B.; Taylor, Kirsten L. (10 November 2017). Introduction to Global Politics. Taylor & Francis. ISBN 978-1-315-30181-5.
- Markovits, Claude, ed. (2012). History of Modern India. Orient Blackswan. p. 350. ISBN 978-1-316-16517-1.
- Martini, Alice; Ford, Kieran; Jackson, Richard, eds. (18 August 2020). Encountering Extremism: Theoretical Issues and Local Challenges. Manchester University Press. ISBN 978-1-5261-3663-3.
- Mazari, Shireen M. (2003). The Kargil Conflict, 1999: Separating Fact from Fiction. Institute of Strategic Studies Islamabad. ISBN 978-969-8772-00-0.
- McGrath, Allen (1996). The Destruction of Pakistan's Democracy. Oxford University Press. p. 38. ISBN 978-0-19-577583-9.
- Mohiuddin, Yasmin Niaz (2007). Pakistan: A Global Studies Handbook. ABC-CLIO. ISBN 978-1-85109-801-9.
- Mookerji, Radhakumud (1989). Ancient Indian Education: Brahmanical and Buddhist. Motilal Banarsidass. pp. 478–479. ISBN 978-81-208-0423-4.
- Mufti, Shahan (2013). The Faithful Scribe: A Story of Islam, Pakistan, Family and War. Other Press. p. 124. ISBN 978-1-59051-505-1.
- Muniapan, Balakrishnan; Shaikh, Junaid M. (February 2007). "Lessons in corporate governance from Kautilya's Arthashastra in ancient India". World Review of Entrepreneurship, Management and Sustainable Development. 3 (1): 50. doi:10.1504/WREMSD.2007.012130.
- "Why Pakistan's Independence Day Is Before India's: Story Behind The Dates". NDTV. 14 August 2025.
- Needham, Joseph (1994). A selection from the writings of Joseph Needham. McFarland & Company. p. 24. ISBN 978-0-89950-903-7.
- Nyrop, Richard F. (1975). Area Handbook for Pakistan. U.S. Government Printing Office.
- Oldenburg, Philip (13 September 2010). India, Pakistan, and Democracy: Solving the Puzzle of Divergent Paths. Taylor & Francis. p. 226. ISBN 978-1-136-93930-3.
- Pandeya, Visva Mohana (2003). Historiography of India's Partition: An Analysis of Imperialist Writings. Atlantic Publishers & Distributors. p. 37. ISBN 978-81-269-0314-6.
- Parker, Philip (3 October 2017). World History: From the Ancient World to the Information Age. DK. p. 75. ISBN 978-0-7440-3345-8.
- Paxton, John, ed. (22 December 2016). The Statesman's Year-Book 1986-87. Palgrave Macmillan. p. 949. ISBN 978-0-230-27115-9.
- Pirbhai, M. Reza (2009). Reconsidering Islam in a South Asian Context. Brill Publishers. ISBN 978-90-04-17758-1.
- Pollitt, Jerome Jordan (12 June 1986). Art in the Hellenistic Age. Cambridge University Press. p. 285. ISBN 978-0-521-27672-6.
- Qassem, Ahmad Shayeq (16 March 2016). Afghanistan's Political Stability: A Dream Unrealised. Taylor & Francis. ISBN 978-1-317-18459-1.
- Quintanilla, Sonya Rhie (15 March 2007). History of Early Stone Sculpture at Mathura, Ca. 150 BCE - 100 CE. Brill. p. 9. ISBN 978-90-474-1930-3.
- Rendell, H. M.; Dennell, Robin W. (June 1985). "Dated Lower Palaeolithic Artefacts From Northern Pakistan". Current Anthropology. 26 (3). The University of Chicago Press Journals: 495–498. Bibcode:1985CurrA..26..393R. doi:10.1086/203287. ISSN 0011-3204. JSTOR 2743470.
- Riggs, Erin P. (2024). A Contemporary Archaeology of Post-Displacement Resettlement: Delhi's 1947 Partition Refugee Homescapes. Routledge. ISBN 978-1-003-24714-2.
- Ruhland, Heike (2019). Peacebuilding in Pakistan: A Study on the Religious Minorities and Initiatives for Interfaith Harmony. Waxmann Verlag GmbH. p. 49. ISBN 978-3-8309-9121-2.
- Rummel, Rudolph J. (1998). Statistics of Democide: Genocide and Mass Murder Since 1900. LIT Verlag. p. 153. ISBN 978-3-8258-4010-5.
- Rustomji, Behram Sohrab H. J. (1952). Karachi, 1839-1947 (a Short History of the Foundation and Growth of Karachi). Excelsior Electric Printing Works.
- Sadasivan, Balaji (2011). The Dancing Girl: A History of Early India. Institute of Southeast Asian Studies. ISBN 978-981-4311-67-0.
- Samad, Rafi U. (2011). The Grandeur of Gandhara: The Ancient Buddhist Civilization of the Swat, Peshawar, Kabul and Indus Valleys. Algora Pib. p. 275. ISBN 978-0-87586-860-8.
- Sengupta, Hindol (December 2023). Soul and Sword: The Endless Battle Over Political Hinduism. Rowman & Littlefield Publishers. p. 53. ISBN 978-1-5381-2684-4.
- Sharma, Anamika; D'Angelo, James; Giri, Ram Ashish, eds. (14 September 2020). Functional Variations in English: Theoretical Considerations and Practical Challenges. Springer International Publishing. p. 130. ISBN 978-3-030-52225-4.
- Sikand, Yoginder (2004). Muslims in India Since 1947: Islamic Perspectives on Inter-Faith Relations. Routledge. p. 5. ISBN 978-1-134-37825-8.
- Simpson, Andrew (30 August 2007). Language and National Identity in Asia. OUP Oxford. p. 102. ISBN 978-0-19-153308-2.
- Singh, Amritjit; Iyer, Nalini; Gairola, Rahul K. (2016). Revisiting India's Partition: New Essays on Memory, Culture, and Politics. Lexington Books. p. 14. ISBN 978-1-4985-3105-4.
- Singh, Gurharpal; Shani, Giorgio (25 November 2021). Sikh Nationalism. Cambridge University Press. p. 75. ISBN 978-1-009-21344-8.
- Stonard, John-Paul (16 October 2017). Creation: A Fully Illustrated, Panoramic World History of Art from Ancient Civilisation to the Present Day. Bloomsbury Publishing. ISBN 978-1-4088-7966-5.
- Stubbs, John H.; Thomson, Robert G. (10 November 2016). Architectural Conservation in Asia: National Experiences and Practice. Taylor & Francis. p. 427. ISBN 978-1-317-40619-8.
- Sunkara, Bhaskar; Walter, Jonah; Rojas, René, eds. (17 January 2024). The Good Die Young: The Verdict on Henry Kissinger. Verso Books. p. 113. ISBN 978-1-78873-030-3.
- Tariq, Shrouq; Stenson, Joe (3 March 2024). "Shehbaz Sharif Voted In As Pakistan's Prime Minister For Second Time". Barron's.
- Totten, Samuel, ed. (September 2000). Teaching about Genocide: Issues, Approaches, and Resources. Information Age Publishing. pp. 147–148. ISBN 978-1-60752-968-2.
- Tucker, Spencer C., ed. (14 December 2015). U.S. Conflicts in the 21st Century: Afghanistan War, Iraq War, and the War on Terror [3 Volumes]. Bloomsbury Publishing. ISBN 979-8-216-15822-6.
- Tucker, Spencer C. (17 April 2017). Modern Conflict in the Greater Middle East: A Country-by-Country Guide. Bloomsbury Publishing. p. 241. ISBN 979-8-216-11844-2.
- Tucker, Spencer C. (2020). The Cold War [5 volumes]: The Definitive Encyclopedia and Document Collection [5 volumes]. Bloomsbury Publishing. p. 1567. ISBN 979-8-216-06249-3.
- United States Senate Committee on Foreign Relations (2008). U.S. Policy Options in Post-election Pakistan: Hearing Before the Committee on Foreign Relations, United States Senate, One Hundred Tenth Congress, Second Session, February 28, 2008 · Volume 4. United States Government Printing Office. p. 54. ISBN 978-0-16-082307-7.
- Visweswaran, Kamala, ed. (6 May 2011). Perspectives on Modern South Asia: A Reader in Culture, History, and Representation. Wiley. p. 125. ISBN 978-1-4051-0062-5.
- Walbridge, Linda (12 October 2012). The Christians of Pakistan: The Passion of Bishop John Joseph. Taylor & Francis. p. 177. ISBN 978-1-136-13186-8.
- Waseem, Mohammad (April 2022). Political Conflict in Pakistan. Oxford University Press. ISBN 978-0-19-765426-2.
- Westad, Odd Arne (2005). The global Cold War: third world interventions and the making of our times. Cambridge University Press. pp. 348–358. ISBN 978-0-521-85364-4.
- Westmoreland, Perry L. (9 December 2019). Life's Wonders. Dorrance Publishing Company, Incorporated. ISBN 978-1-64426-834-6.
- Wilson, John, ed. (2009). Pakistan: The Struggle Within. Longman. p. 93. ISBN 978-81-317-2504-7.
- Wink, André (2002). Early Medieval India and the Expansion of Islam: 7th–11th Centuries, Volume 1. Al-Hind: the Making of the Indo-Islamic World. Brill Publishers. p. 129. ISBN 978-0-391-04173-8.
- Wolpert, Stanley A. (1984). Jinnah of Pakistan. Oxford University Press. ISBN 978-0-19-503412-7.
- Wolpert, Stanley A. (2009). Shameful Flight: The Last Years of the British Empire in India. Oxford University Press. p. 163. ISBN 978-0-19-974504-3.
- Wuthnow, Robert, ed. (4 December 2013). The Encyclopedia of Politics and Religion: 2-volume Set. Taylor & Francis. p. 427. ISBN 978-1-136-28493-9.
- Yap, Po Jen; Abeyratne, Rehan, eds. (24 March 2023). Routledge Handbook of Asian Parliaments. Taylor & Francis. ISBN 978-1-000-85060-4.
- Yarbakhsh, Elisabeth (9 October 2019). The Middle East and South Asia 2019-2020. Rowman & Littlefield. p. 270. ISBN 978-1-4758-5217-2.

=== Geography ===
- Abul-Soad, Adel Ahmed (2011), Date Palm in Pakistan, Current Status and Prospective (PDF), United States Agency for International Development, archived from the original (PDF) on 7 August 2015
- Agarwal, Aakash; Ahmad, Alaaeldin Azmi, eds. (27 January 2021). Early Onset Scoliosis: Guidelines for Management in Resource-Limited Settings. CRC Press. ISBN 978-1-000-29866-6.
- Ahmad, Aijazuddin (2009). Geography of the South Asian Subcontinent: A Critical Approach. Concept Publishing Company. p. 24. ISBN 978-81-8069-568-1.
- Akhtar, Rubina; Mirza, Sarwat Naz (January–June 2006). "Arid steppes of Balochistan (Pakistan)" (PDF). Science et changements planétaires / Sécheresse. 17 (1). John Libbey: 203–209. ISSN 1777-5922. Archived from the original (PDF) on 30 October 2023.
- Alisibramulisi, Anizahyati; Che Ibrahim, Che Khairil Izam; Mansor, Hazrina; Billah, Muntasir; Belayutham, Sheila, eds. (6 April 2022). Proceedings of the 5th International Conference on Sustainable Civil Engineering Structures and Construction Materials: SCESCM 2020. Singapore: Springer Nature. p. 207. ISBN 978-981-16-7924-7.
- Banerjee, Gautam (2 April 2019). China's Great Leap Forward-II: The China Pakistan Economic Corridorand Strategic Reshaping of Indian Neighbourhood. Lancer Publishers. ISBN 978-1-940988-43-6.
- Blood, Peter R. (December 1996). Pakistan: A Country Study. DIANE Publishing Company. ISBN 978-0-7881-3631-3.
- Bright, Michael (24 October 2017). 1001 Natural Wonders You Must See Before You Die. Book Sales. p. 681. ISBN 978-0-7858-3583-7.
- Azad Kashmir. Encyclopedia Britannica. 13 May 2024.
- Gulf of Oman. Encyclopedia Britannica. 13 April 2024.
- "Pakistan: Fourth National Report" (PDF), Government of Pakistan (Ministry of Environment), Convention on Biological Diversity, 2009
- Chandrappa, Ramesha W.; Gupta, Sushil; Kulshrestha, Umesh Chandra (17 June 2011). Coping with Climate Change: Principles and Asian Context. Springer Berlin Heidelberg. p. 347. ISBN 978-3-642-19674-4.
- Cheng, Gong; Wang, Sibao; Zhou, Xiao-Nong; Guo, Xiao-kui; Feng, Xinyu, eds. (23 December 2022). Needs and potential application of one health approach in the control of vector-borne and zoonotic infectious disease. Frontiers Media. p. 81. ISBN 978-2-8325-0956-2.
- "Geography: The borders of Pakistan". Dawn. 17 October 2009.
- Descals, Adrià; Wich, Serge; Szantoi, Zoltan; Struebig, Matthew J.; Dennis, Rona; Hatton, Zoe; Ariffin, Thina; Unus, Nabillah; Gaveau, David L. A.; Meijaard, Erik (8 September 2023). "High-resolution global map of closed-canopy coconut palm" (PDF). Earth System Science Data. 15 (9): 3991–4010. Bibcode:2023ESSD...15.3991D. doi:10.5194/essd-15-3991-2023. ISSN 1866-3516.
- Descloitres, Jacques (26 October 2002). "Indus River, Pakistan". MODIS Rapid Response Team, NASA/GSFC. NASA Visible Earth.
- DeVivo, Benedetto; Laor, Efraim; Panza, Giuliano; Kossobokov, Vladimir G., eds. (21 May 2021). Earthquakes and Sustainable Infrastructure: Neodeterministic (NDSHA) Approach Guarantees Prevention Rather Than Cure. Elsevier Science. pp. 546–547. ISBN 978-0-12-823541-6.
- DeVotta, Neil, ed. (23 October 2015). An Introduction to South Asian Politics. Taylor & Francis. p. 37. ISBN 978-1-317-36973-8.
- El-Esawi, Mohamed, ed. (11 December 2019). Legume Crops: Characterization and Breeding for Improved Food Security. IntechOpen. p. 24. ISBN 978-1-83968-086-1.
- Faridah-Hanum, I.; Hakeem, Khalid Rehman; Öztürk, Münir; Efe, Recep, eds. (5 May 2015). Climate Change Impacts on High-Altitude Ecosystems. Springer International Publishing. pp. 461–462. ISBN 978-3-319-12859-7.
- Fatima, Naz (30 June 2020). "Some Interesting facts about National Animal of Pakistan". MARKHOR (The Journal of Zoology). 1 (1): 02. doi:10.54393/mjz.v1i1.13. ISSN 2790-4385. S2CID 246708061.
- Flux, John E. C.; Chapman, Joseph A., eds. (1990). Rabbits, Hares and Pikas: Status Survey and Conservation Action Plan. International Union for Conservation of Nature and Natural Resources. p. 82. ISBN 978-2-8317-0019-9.
- Grantham, H. S.; et al. (2020). "Anthropogenic modification of forests means only 40% of remaining forests have high ecosystem integrity – Supplementary Material". Nature Communications. 11 (1): 5978. Bibcode:2020NatCo..11.5978G. doi:10.1038/s41467-020-19493-3. ISSN 2041-1723. PMC 7723057. PMID 33293507.
- Grimmett, Richard; Inskipp, Tim (7 January 2021). Birds of Pakistan. Bloomsbury Publishing. ISBN 978-1-4729-9031-0.
- Haque, Jameel (2002). Pakistan. Gareth Stevens. p. 6. ISBN 978-0-8368-2352-3.
- Hunter, Luke (2018). Carnivores of the World: Second Edition. Princeton University Press. p. 56. ISBN 978-0-691-18295-7.
- Jiwani, Azam H. (19 August 2021). Humanizing Medicine: Making Health Tangible: Memoirs of Engagement with a Global Development Network. FriesenPress. p. 54. ISBN 978-1-0391-0908-7.
- Karaman, Igor V. (2012). Dispute Resolution in the Law of the Sea. Martinus Nijhoff Publishers. p. 346. ISBN 978-90-04-21202-2.
- Khan, Intizar H.; Clyde, William C. (29 July 2013). "Lower Paleogene Tectonostratigraphy of Balochistan: Evidence for Time-Transgressive Late Paleocene-Early Eocene Uplift". Geosciences. 3 (3). MDPI: 466–501. Bibcode:2013Geosc...3..466K. doi:10.3390/geosciences3030466. ISSN 2076-3263.
- Kreft, Heinrich (2007), The Geopolitical Importance of Pakistan (PDF), ETH Zurich
- Lane, Alexander; Norton, Michael; Ryan, Sandra (13 July 2017). Water Resources: A New Water Architecture. Wiley. ISBN 978-1-118-79407-4.
- Mallon, David P.; Kingswood, Steven Charles, eds. (2001). Antelopes: North Africa, the Middle East, and Asia. International Union for Conservation of Nature. p. 124. ISBN 978-2-8317-0594-1.
- Mordi, Chima; Adisa, Toyin Ajibade, eds. (16 May 2022). HRM in the Global South: A Critical Perspective. Springer International Publishing. p. 292. ISBN 978-3-030-98309-3.
- "National Environment Report" (PDF), Geomatic Center for Climate Change & Sustainable Development, Pakistan Environmental Protection Agency (Ministry of Climate Change), p. 18, 2016, archived (PDF) from the original on 28 May 2024
- Roze, Uldis (28 September 2012). Porcupines: The Animal Answer Guide. Johns Hopkins University Press. p. 132. ISBN 978-1-4214-0735-7.
- Samuel, Paul S., ed. (24 February 2016). Meteorology and Energy Security: Simulations, Projections, and Management. Apple Academic Press. p. 129. ISBN 978-1-77188-387-0.
- Sandhu, Parvinder Singh (2010). Environmental Science and Technology. Research Publishing Services. ISBN 978-981-08-5716-5.
- San, Emmanuel Do Linh; Belant, Jerrold L.; Sato, Jun J.; Somers, Michael, eds. (25 October 2021). Small Carnivores: Evolution, Ecology, Behaviour and Conservation. Wiley. p. 263. ISBN 978-1-118-94328-1.
- Somerville, Keith (18 March 2021). Humans and Hyenas: Monster Or Misunderstood. Taylor & Francis. ISBN 978-1-000-36056-1.
- Spate, O. H. K.; Learmonth, A. T. A. (7 April 2017). India and Pakistan: A General and Regional Geography. Taylor & Francis. ISBN 978-1-351-96898-0.
- Srinivasulu, Chelmala (3 September 2018). South Asian Mammals: An Updated Checklist and Their Scientific Names. CRC Press. ISBN 978-0-429-88089-6.
- Srinivasulu, Chelmala; Srinivasulu, Bhargavi, eds. (19 May 2012). South Asian Mammals: Their Diversity, Distribution, and Status. Springer New York. p. 305. ISBN 978-1-4614-3449-8.
- Stoneman, Richard (8 June 2021). The Greek Experience of India: From Alexander to the Indo-Greeks. Princeton University Press. p. 26. ISBN 978-0-691-21747-5.
- Sunquist, Fiona; Sunquist, Mel (2 October 2014). The Wild Cat Book: Everything You Ever Wanted to Know about Cats. University of Chicago Press. p. 239. ISBN 978-0-226-78026-9.
- Sunquist, Mel; Sunquist, Fiona (15 May 2017). Wild Cats of the World. University of Chicago Press. p. 72. ISBN 978-0-226-51823-7.
- Tisdell, C. A. (22 October 2013). Wild Pigs: Environmental Pest Or Economic Resource?. Elsevier Science. p. 20. ISBN 978-1-4831-8225-4.
- UNEP-WCMC (2024). "East Afghan Montane Conifer Forests". One Earth.
- Waseem, Muhammad; Khan, Barkatullah; Mahmood, Tariq; Hussain, Hafiz Sajid; Aziz, Rizwana; Akrim, Faraz; Ahmad, Tariq; Nazir, Rabia; Ali, Mirza Wajid; Awan, Muhammad Naeem (September 2020). "Occupancy, habitat suitability and habitat preference of endangered indian pangolin (Manis crassicaudata) in Potohar Plateau and Azad Jammu and Kashmir, Pakistan". Global Ecology and Conservation. 23 e01135. Elsevier B.V. Bibcode:2020GEcoC..2301135W. doi:10.1016/j.gecco.2020.e01135. ISSN 2351-9894.
- Woods, Charles Arthur; Mufti, Shahzad Ahmad; Hasan, Syed Azhar, eds. (1997). Biodiversity of Pakistan. Pakistan Museum of Natural History. p. 533. ISBN 978-0-9660913-0-4.
- "Forest area (% of land area) - Pakistan". World Bank. Food and Agriculture Organization. 2024.
- "Indus River Dolphin". WWF. 2024.

=== Government and politics ===
- Abbas, Hassan (2015). Pakistan's Drift Into Extremism: Allah, the Army, and America's War on Terror. Routledge. p. 148. ISBN 978-1-317-46328-3.
- Adibelli, Barış; Gülbaş, Elif; Keskin, Ghulam Faroq; Ünlü, Hayati; Türkmen, Hediye Gamze; Şahin, H. Hilal; Ansari, Mohammed Javed; Islam, Nazmul; Aslan, Ömer (15 December 2022). South Asia Country Analyses: Afghanistan, Bangladesh, Bhutan, India, Maldives, Nepal, Pakistan, Sri Lanka. South Asia Strategic Research Center. pp. 131–132. ISBN 978-605-72072-1-0.
- Afridi, Jamal; Bajoria, Jayshree (6 July 2010). "China-Pakistan Relations". Council on Foreign Relations.
- Aftab, Zara (June 2022). Pakistan's Terror: Identification and Awareness Regarding the Harmful Cultural Practice of Swara (PDF). Department of Legal Studies (Master of Arts in Human Rights thesis). Vienna: Central European University.
- Ahmad, Dawood; Asif, Aizaz (June 2007), "A Guide to Understanding the Budget in Pakistan" (PDF), Parliament of Pakistan, p. 12
- Ahmed, Zahid Shahab; Zahoor, Musharaf (17 February 2019). "Bangladesh-Pakistan relations: hostage to a traumatic past". Commonwealth & Comparative Politics. 57 (1). Taylor & Francis: 31–51. doi:10.1080/14662043.2019.1575032. ISSN 0306-3631.
- Anwar, Muhammad (27 November 2006). Friends Near Home: Pakistan's Strategic Security Options. Islamabad: AuthorHouse UK. ISBN 978-1-4670-1541-7.
- Arora, Ranjana; Grover, Verinder, eds. (1995). Political System in Pakistan: The Islamic state of Pakistan: role of religion in politics. Deep & Deep. p. 189. ISBN 978-81-7100-737-0.
- Asia Watch Committee (U.S.) (1992). Double Jeopardy: Police Abuse of Women in Pakistan. Human Rights Watch. p. 17. ISBN 978-1-56432-063-6.
- Aziz, Sadaf (11 January 2018). The Constitution of Pakistan: A Contextual Analysis. Bloomsbury Publishing. pp. 94–95. ISBN 978-1-5099-1912-3.
- Babayev, Azer; Schoch, Bruno; Spanger, Hans-Joachim, eds. (2 May 2019). The Nagorno-Karabakh Deadlock: Insights from Successful Conflict Settlements. Springer Fachmedien Wiesbaden. p. 286. ISBN 978-3-658-25199-4.
- Baderin, Mashood A., ed. (2 March 2017). Islamic Law in Practice: Volume III. Taylor & Francis. ISBN 978-1-351-92593-8.
- Bartholomees, J. Boone, ed. (2008). U.S. Army War College Guide to National Security Issues: National security policy and strategy. Strategic Studies Institute. p. 247. ISBN 978-1-58487-357-0.
- Basharat, Iqra (17 December 2023), "Diplomatic Evolution: Pakistan's Transition from Neutrality to Mediation in the Saudi-Iran Rivalry [2015-2023] Section: BSIR-A", International Islamic University
- Berg, Eiki; Kursani, Shpend (21 December 2021). De Facto States and Land-for-Peace Agreements: Territory and Recognition at Odds?. Taylor & Francis. ISBN 978-1-000-51859-7.
- Berman, Evan M.; Sabharwal, Meghna, eds. (25 September 2017). Public Administration in South Asia: India, Bangladesh, and Pakistan. Taylor & Francis. p. 424. ISBN 978-1-351-55266-0.
- Bhattacharyya, Rituparna, ed. (7 July 2023). Genocides and Xenophobia in South Asia and Beyond: A Transdisciplinary Perspective on Known, Lesser-known and Unknown Crime of Crimes. Taylor & Francis. ISBN 978-1-000-90434-5.
- Bloor, Kevin (9 March 2023). Global Politics. AuthorHouse UK. ISBN 979-8-8230-8099-6.
- Bruno, Greg; Bajoria, Jayshree (26 June 2008). "U.S-Pakistan Military Cooperation". Council on Foreign Relations.
- Buzan, Barry (2004). The United States and the great powers: world politics in the twenty-first century. Polity. pp. 71, 99. ISBN 978-0-7456-3374-9.
- Buzan, Barry; Waever, Ole (2003). Regions and Powers: The Structure of International Security. Cambridge University Press. p. 55. ISBN 978-0-521-89111-0.
- Center for Preventive Action (9 April 2024). "Conflict Between India and Pakistan". Council on Foreign Relations.
- Chakma, Bhumitra (12 October 2012). Pakistan's Nuclear Weapons. Taylor & Francis. ISBN 978-1-134-13254-6.
- Chakma, Bhumitra, ed. (25 June 2014). South Asia in Transition: Democracy, Political Economy and Security. Palgrave Macmillan. p. 270. ISBN 978-1-137-35664-2.
- Chengappa, Bidanda M. (January–March 2002). "Pakistan: Impact of Islamic Socialism". Strategic Analysis. 26 (1). Taylor & Francis: 27–47. doi:10.1080/09700160208450024. ISSN 0970-0161.
- Chengappa, Bidanda M. (2004). Pakistan, Islamisation, Army and Foreign Policy. APH Publishing. p. 42. ISBN 978-81-7648-548-7.
- United States Central Intelligence Agency (1988). India--Pakistan Border Kashmir Area (map). Central Intelligence Agency.
- Clary, Christopher (31 October 2022). "Russia–Pakistan Relations and the Constraints of Geoeconomics". Asian Survey. 62 (5–6). University of California Press: 838–865. doi:10.1525/as.2022.1801312. ISSN 0004-4687.
- Cohen, Stephen P. (October 2011). The Future of Pakistan. Brookings Institution Press. p. 123. ISBN 978-0-8157-2181-9.
- Cordesman, Anthony H. (1987). Western Strategic Interests in Saudi Arabia. Croom Helm. pp. 139–140. ISBN 978-81-8069-568-1.
- "Corruption Perceptions Index – Pakistan". Transparency International. August 2025.
- "Pakistan's Domestic Political Setting", Congressional Research Service, 2 November 2023
- Davis, Alexander E. (12 May 2023). The Geopolitics of Melting Mountains: An International Political Ecology of the Himalaya. Singapore: Springer Nature. p. 83. ISBN 978-981-9916-81-8.
- de Coning, Cedric; Aoi, Chiyuki; Karlsrud, John, eds. (20 February 2017). UN Peacekeeping Doctrine in a New Era: Adapting to Stabilisation, Protection and New Threats. Taylor & Francis. pp. 157–158. ISBN 978-1-315-39693-4.
- DeRouen, Karl R.; Heo, Uk, eds. (2005). Defense and Security: A Compendium of National Armed Forces and Security Policies. ABC-Clio. p. 579. ISBN 978-1-85109-786-9.
- Dhulipala, Venkat (2015). Creating a New Medina: State Power, Islam, and the Quest for Pakistan in Late Colonial North India. Cambridge University Press. ISBN 978-1-316-25838-5.
- Diamantides, Marinos; Gearey, Adam, eds. (8 August 2011). Islam, Law and Identity. Routledge. pp. 196–198. ISBN 978-1-136-67565-2.
- Dorsey, James M. (19 July 2018). China and the Middle East: Venturing Into the Maelstrom. Springer International Publishing. p. 180. ISBN 978-3-319-64355-7.
- Dowding, Keith; Dumont, Patrick, eds. (13 August 2014). The Selection of Ministers Around the World. Taylor & Francis. p. 120. ISBN 978-1-317-63445-4.
- Ejaz, Noor (2022). "The Gilgit Baltistan Constitutional Crisis". Research Society of International Law.
- "Press Release on the 2022 annual summit of the Shangai Cooperation Organisation". Embassy of the Russian Federation to the Republic of Malta. 19 September 2022.
- Endrst, Jeff (8 September 1965). "Kashmir Old Headache For U.N." The Pittsburgh Press.
- Esposito, John L., ed. (15 May 2003). The Oxford Dictionary of Islam. Oxford University Press. p. 242. ISBN 978-0-19-975726-8.
- "A Manual on Appointment, Promotion and Transfer" (PDF), Establishment Division, 2013, archived from the original (PDF) on 26 August 2024
- "Civil Service of Pakistan (Composition and Cadre) Rules, 1954" (PDF), Establishment Division, 2021
- Faruqui, Ahmad (14 June 2019). Rethinking the National Security of Pakistan: The Price of Strategic Myopia. Taylor & Francis. ISBN 978-1-351-76157-4.
- Fischer-Tahir, Andrea; Naumann, Matthias, eds. (12 January 2013). Peripheralization: The Making of Spatial Dependencies and Social Injustice. Springer Fachmedien Wiesbaden. p. 79. ISBN 978-3-531-19018-1.
- Gabol, Imran; Ali, Imtiaz (6 March 2025). "Pakistan human rights commission alarmed at government withholding ads from some publications". Asia News Network.
- Ganguly, A. K. (16 May 2019). Kashmir: An Affair of Continued Existence. Vij Books India Private Limited. ISBN 978-93-88161-42-8.
- Gates, Scott; Roy, Kaushik (17 February 2016). Unconventional Warfare in South Asia: Shadow Warriors and Counterinsurgency. Taylor & Francis. p. 89. ISBN 978-1-317-00541-4.
- Gerber, Paula, ed. (26 January 2021). Worldwide Perspectives on Lesbians, Gays, and Bisexuals [3 Volumes]. Bloomsbury Publishing. ISBN 979-8-216-16895-9.
- Global Organized Crime Index: Pakistan (Report). Global Initiative Against Transnational Organized Crime. 2025.
- Halladay, Carolyn; Matei, Florina Cristiana; Bruneau, Thomas C., eds. (November 2021). The Routledge Handbook of Civil-Military Relations. Taylor & Francis. p. 53. ISBN 978-1-000-47155-7.
- Hamid, Mairaj ul; Aquil, Saira; Mubarakzeb; Khan, Salman; Zaman, Faisal; Hamza (2023). "Pakistan's Foreign Policy: An Abridgement Of Internal And External Determinants". Journal of Positive School Psychology. 7 (4): 1089–1098. ISSN 2717-7564.
- Haqqani, Husain (2010). Pakistan: Between Mosque and Military. Carnegie Endowment. ISBN 978-0-87003-285-1.
- Haqqani, Husain (5 November 2013). Magnificent Delusions: Pakistan, the United States, and an Epic History of Misunderstanding. PublicAffairs. pp. 20–22. ISBN 978-1-61039-317-1.
- He, Baogang; Breen, Michael G.; Allison-Reumann, Laura (23 June 2023). Comparative Federalism in Asia: Democracy, Ethnicity and Religion. Taylor & Francis. ISBN 978-1-000-90105-4.
- Hoekman, Bernard M.; Kostecki, M. M. (2009). The Political Economy of the World Trading System: The WTO and Beyond. Oxford University Press. p. 285. ISBN 978-0-19-955377-8.
- Hunter, Shireen T. (20 May 2010). Iran's Foreign Policy in the Post-Soviet Era: Resisting the New International Order. Bloomsbury Academic. p. 144. ISBN 978-0-313-38194-2.
- Hussain, Bilal (22 October 2025). "Cybercrime surges 35% in Pakistan in 2025 amid govt's push for cryptocurrency legalisation". Business Recorder.
- Hussain, Faqir (May 2015), "The Judicial System of Pakistan" (PDF), Supreme Court of Pakistan, p. 8
- Hussain, Syed Asif (2020), "Azad Jammu & Kashmir at a Glance – 2020" (PDF), Bureau of Statistics, Planning and Development Department, Government of Azad Kashmir, p. 3
- "Provincial Assemblies" (PDF), International Foundation for Electoral Systems, 27 March 2013
- International Institute for Strategic Studies (13 February 2024). The Military Balance 2024. Taylor & Francis. pp. 16, 158, 218, 301–305. ISBN 978-1-032-78004-7.
- Imam, Syed Kaleem; Fatima, Samza (2021). "Significance of Road Safety: Challenges and Prospects" (PDF). Pakistan Journal of Criminology. 13 (4): 92–109. ISSN 2074-2738. Archived from the original (PDF) on 16 July 2025.
- Inter-Parliamentary Union (1973). Constitutional and Parliamentary Information: Volumes 93–104. Association of Secretaries General of Parliaments. p. 122.
- Iqbal, Khurshid (10 September 2009). The Right to Development in International Law: The Case of Pakistan. Routledge. p. 189. ISBN 978-1-134-01999-1.
- Pakistan. Internet Society Pulse (Report). Internet Society. 2026.
- Izuyama, Marie; Ogawa, Shinichi (March 2003), "The Nuclear Policy of India and Pakistan" (PDF), National Institute for Defense Studies, Japan
- Jafri, Mubashar Hasan; Sultana, Summer; Ijaz, Sabir (29 March 2021). "Muhammad Ali Jinnah's Views on Palestine and Question of Recognizing Israel". Pakistan Journal of International Affairs. 4 (1). Karachi, Pakistan: Society for Social Sciences & Research Association: 727–739. doi:10.58575/pjia.v4i1.164 (inactive 13 July 2026). ISSN 2664-360X.
- Jaishankar, K., ed. (August 2019). Routledge Handbook of South Asian Criminology. Taylor & Francis. ISBN 978-1-000-30088-8.
- Jan, Faizullah (12 November 2015). The Muslim Extremist Discourse: Constructing Us Versus Them. Lexington Books. p. 30. ISBN 978-1-4985-2038-6.
- Jha, U.C. (15 August 2016). Pakistan Army: Legislator, Judge and Executioner. KW Publishers. ISBN 978-93-86288-30-1.
- Kahwaji, Riad (22 September 2025). "Saudi-Pakistan defense pact brings new nuclear player to region". Breaking Defense.
- Karat, Prakash (2007). Subordinate Ally: The Nuclear Deal and India-US Strategic Relations. LeftWord Books. p. 10. ISBN 978-81-87496-73-1.
- Kemal, A.R. (February 2004). "Exploring Pakistan's Regional Economic Cooperation Potential" (PDF). The Pakistan Development Review. 43 (4). Islamabad: Pakistan Institute of Development Economics: 313–334. doi:10.30541/v43i4Ipp.313-334. ISSN 0030-9729. JSTOR 41260693.
- Kepel, Gilles (2006). Jihad: The Trail of Political Islam. Bloomsbury Publishing. pp. 100–101. ISBN 978-1-84511-257-8.
- Khan, Zahid Ali (2012). "Military operations in FATA and PATA: implications for Pakistan" (PDF). Strategic Studies. 31/32 (4/1). Islamabad: Institute of Strategic Studies Islamabad: 129–146. ISSN 1029-0990. JSTOR 48527641.
- Khurshid, Tooba (2016). "United Nations Security Council Resolutions: Status of the People of Jammu and Kashmir" (PDF). Strategic Studies. 36 (4). Institute of Strategic Studies Islamabad: 100–122. ISSN 1811-9557. JSTOR 48535976.
- Kmentt, Alexander (17 May 2021). The Treaty Prohibiting Nuclear Weapons: How it was Achieved and Why it Matters. Taylor & Francis. ISBN 978-1-000-39348-4.
- Kronstadt, K. Alan (22 May 2023). "Pakistan and U.S.-Pakistan Relations". Congressional Research Service.
- Kudaisya, Gyanesh; Yong, Tan Tai (March 2004). The Aftermath of Partition in South Asia. Taylor & Francis. p. 217. ISBN 978-1-134-44048-1.
- Kumar, Raksha (3 October 2023). "As Pakistan approaches a crucial election, its media watchdog bans critical voices from TV". Reuters Institute for the Study of Journalism.
- Kureshi, Yasser; Waseem, Zoha (9 October 2024). "The politics of policing in Pakistan: decentralisation of power in a federalised political landscape". Commonwealth & Comparative Politics. 62 (3). Taylor & Francis: 315–338. doi:10.1080/14662043.2024.2397851. ISSN 1743-9094.
- Lalwani, Sameer P. (March 2023). A Threshold Alliance: The China-Pakistan Military Relationship (PDF). United States Institute of Peace (Report). Special Report. Archived from the original (PDF) on 7 March 2025.
- Lansford, Tom; Muller, Tom, eds. (2 April 2012). Political Handbook of the World 2012. Sage Publishing. p. 1102. ISBN 978-1-60871-995-2.
- Lintner, Bertil (19–22 August 2002). Religious Extremism and Nationalism in Bangladesh (PDF). Religion & Security in South Asia – An International Workshop. Asia-Pacific Center for Security Studies. Honolulu, Hawaii. p. 418.
- Lodhi, Maleeha (2 May 2022). "Independent foreign policy?". Dawn.
- Lord, Winston; Mastro, Oriana Skylar; Naftali, Timothy; Brinkley, Douglas G. (25 February 2022). President Nixon's Trip to China: Fifty Years Later. Lessons from History. Council on Foreign Relations.
- Mahmood, Shaukat (1965). The Constitution of Pakistan. Pakistan Law Times Publications. p. 132.
- Mahmood, Sohail (2007). Good Governance Reform Agenda in Pakistan: Current Challenges. Nova Science Publishers. p. 77. ISBN 978-1-60021-418-9.
- Maizland, Lindsay (19 January 2023). "Pakistan's Role in the Afghanistan War's Outcome". Council on Foreign Relations.
- Marès, Blanche (14 May 2025). "World Press Freedom Index 2025: Over half of world's population in "red zones"". Reporters Without Borders.
- Mazzetti, Mark (9 April 2013). The Way of the Knife: The CIA, a Secret Army, and a War at the Ends of the Earth. Penguin Random House. ISBN 978-1-101-61794-6.
- Miller, Flagg (2015). The Audacious Ascetic: What the Bin Laden Tapes Reveal About Al-Qa'ida. Oxford University Press. ISBN 978-0-19-061339-6.
- Mubashar, Laiba; Mir, Muhammad Wasay (7 September 2023). "Acid Attacks: Pakistan's Worst Social Epidemic". Pulitzer Center.
- Munir, Muhammad (1975). Constitution of the Islamic Republic of Pakistan: Being a Commentary on the Constitution of Pakistan, 1973. Law Publishing Company. p. 78.
- Nasr, Seyyed Vali Reza (1996). Mawdudi and the Making of Islamic Revivalism. Oxford University Press. pp. 45–46. ISBN 978-0-19-535711-0.
- Nazrul Islam, Md; Saidul Islam, Md (3 March 2018). "Islam, Politics and Secularism in Bangladesh: Contesting the Dominant Narratives". Social Sciences. 7 (3) 37. MDPI. doi:10.3390/socsci7030037. ISSN 2076-0760.
- Nee, Patrick (12 March 2013). Key Facts on Pakistan: Essential Information on Pakistan. CreateSpace Independent Publishing Platform. ISBN 978-1-4827-5470-4.
- Noor, Sitara (1 October 2023). "Pakistan's Evolving Nuclear Doctrine". Arms Control Today. 53 (8). Arms Control Association: 26–32. ISSN 0196-125X.
- Oberst, Robert C. (19 April 2018). Government and Politics in South Asia. Taylor & Francis. ISBN 978-0-429-97484-7.
- Oetzel, John G.; Ting-Toomey, Stella (18 January 2006). The SAGE Handbook of Conflict Communication: Integrating Theory, Research, and Practice. SAGE Publishers. p. 506. ISBN 978-1-4522-6163-8.
- Oldenburg, Philip, ed. (8 April 2019). India Briefing, 1991. Taylor & Francis. ISBN 978-0-429-72264-6.
- Panda, Ankit (February 2019). Pakistan's Approach to Navigating the Saudi-Iranian Split (PDF). United States Institute of Peace (Report). Special Report. p. 12. Archived from the original (PDF) on 11 March 2019.
- Pande, Aparna (16 March 2011). Explaining Pakistan's Foreign Policy: Escaping India. Taylor & Francis. ISBN 978-1-136-81894-3.
- Pant, Harsh V. (6 October 2011). China's Rising Global Profile: The Great Power Tradition. Liverpool University Press. p. 31. ISBN 978-1-83624-059-4.
- Pasha, Sayed Abdul Muneem (2005). Islam in Pakistan's Foreign Policy. Global Media Publications. pp. 225–226. ISBN 978-81-88869-15-2.
- Paul, T. V. (2012). International Relations Theory and Regional Transformation. Cambridge University Press. p. 11. ISBN 978-1-107-02021-4.
- Table 1: Households, Population, Household Size and Annual Growth Rate (PDF), Pakistan Bureau of Statistics, 2023
- Perito, Robert; Parvez, Tariq (August 2024). A Counterterrorism Role for Pakistan's Police Stations (PDF) (Report). Special Report. United States Institute of Peace. p. 9. ISBN 978-1-60127-233-1.
- Picone, Louis L. (4 February 2020). The President Is Dead!: The Extraordinary Stories of Presidential Deaths, Final Days, Burials, and Beyond. Skyhorse. p. 10. ISBN 978-1-5107-5454-6.
- "Chapter 2. How Muslims and Westerners View Each Other". Pew Research Center. 21 July 2011.
- Qingyan, Li (8 September 2021). "China–Pakistan "Iron Brotherhood": 70 Years Hand in Hand". China Institute of International Studies.
- Rafiq, Adnan; Ahmad, Ishtiaq, eds. (3 November 2016). Pakistan's Democratic Transition: Change and Persistence. Taylor & Francis. p. 174. ISBN 978-1-317-23595-8.
- Raghavan, V.R., ed. (9 May 2012). Conflicts in Jammu and Kashmir: Impact on Polity, Society and Economy. Vij Books India Private Limited. p. 83. ISBN 978-93-82573-33-3.
- Rajagopalan, Rajesh (2011). "Pakistan: regional power, global problem?". In Nadine Godehardt; Dirk Nabers (eds.). Regional Orders and Regional Powers. Routledge. pp. 193–208. ISBN 978-1-136-71891-5.
- Raju, Adluri Subramanyam, ed. (5 October 2021). South Asia and China: Engagement in the Twenty-First Century. Taylor & Francis. ISBN 978-1-000-45953-1.
- Riedel, Bruce (20 May 2010). "Pakistan's Role in the Afghanistan War's Outcome". Brookings Institution.
- Rimmer, Peter J. (27 November 2020). China's Global Vision and Actions: Reactions to Belt, Road and Beyond. Edward Elgar Publishing. p. 61. ISBN 978-1-78897-897-2.
- Rizvi, Hasan Askari (15 January 1993). Pakistan and the Geostrategic Environment: A Study of Foreign Policy. Palgrave Macmillan UK. p. 84. ISBN 978-0-230-37984-8.
- Rizvi, Hasan Askari (April 2004), Pakistan's Foreign Policy:An Overview 1947–2004 (PDF), Pakistan Institute of Legislative Development and Transparency, pp. 10–12, 20, archived from the original (PDF) on 6 August 2024
- Roberts, Jeffery (30 December 2003). The Origins of Conflict in Afghanistan. Bloomsbury Academic. p. 134. ISBN 978-0-275-97878-5.
- Roos, Dave (22 February 2024). "How Nixon's 1972 Visit to China Changed the Balance of Cold War Power". History Channel.
- Rose, Leo E.; Husain, Noor A., eds. (1985). United States-Pakistan Relations. Institute of East Asian Studies, University of California. p. 209. ISBN 978-0-912966-78-6.
- Rupert, James (Fall 1989). "Afghanistan's Slide toward Civil War". World Policy Journal. 6 (4). Duke University Press: 759–785. ISSN 0740-2775. JSTOR 40209132.
- Saeed, Aamir (24 June 2021). "Experts divided over effectiveness of Pakistan's new intelligence coordination committee". Arab News.
- Schuurmans, Laura (2023). Azaadi, Freedom and Change in Kashmir. Arena Books. ISBN 978-1-914390-10-4.
- Schwinghammer, Torsten (24 April 2018). Warfare Since the Second World War. Taylor & Francis. ISBN 978-1-351-28970-2.
- "The Constitution of The Islamic Republic of Pakistan" (PDF), Senate of Pakistan, p. 57, 31 May 2018, archived from the original (PDF) on 10 July 2024
- Shah, Mehtab Ali (31 December 1997). The Foreign Policy of Pakistan: Ethnic Impacts on Diplomacy, 1971–94. Bloomsbury Academic. ISBN 978-1-86064-169-5.
- Shih, Chih-yu (April 2022). Post-Chineseness: Cultural Politics and International Relations. State University of New York Press. ISBN 978-1-4384-8772-4.
- Singh, Harshita; Lee, Jae-Seung; Roh, Myunghoon; Dhamija, Somesh; Yadav, Tarun Pratap, eds. (2 December 2024). Global Law, Human Rights, and Intersections with Honor Killing. IGI Global. p. 85. ISBN 979-8-3693-9598-1.
- Solomon, Hussein (May 1997). "South African Foreign Policy and Middle Power Leadership". Archived from the original on 24 June 2002.
- Sprague, Stanley B. (12 November 2020). Pakistan Since Independence: A History, 1947 to Today. McFarland, Incorporated, Publishers. p. 29. ISBN 978-1-4766-8151-1.
- Stewart, Richard W. (2002). "The United States Army in Somalia, 1992–1994". U.S. Army Center of Military History. p. 19. CMH Pub 70-81-1. Archived from the original on 14 December 2007.
- Stewart-Ingersoll, Robert; Frazier, Derrick (23 May 2012). Regional Powers and Security Orders: A Theoretical Framework. Taylor & Francis. p. 217. ISBN 978-1-136-64497-9.
- Stone, Lester B. (February 2017). War and the Market Economy. Vij Books India Private Limited. ISBN 978-93-86834-41-6.
- Syed, Jawad; Pio, Edwina; Kamran, Tahir; Zaidi, Abbas, eds. (2016). Faith-Based Violence and Deobandi Militancy in Pakistan. Springer Publishing. ISBN 978-1-349-94966-3.
- Talbot, Ian (28 December 2020). The History of British Diplomacy in Pakistan. Taylor & Francis. ISBN 978-1-000-32670-3.
- Tertrais, Bruno; Sokolski, Henry D., eds. (2013). Nuclear Weapons Security Crises: What Does History Teach?. Strategic Studies Institute and U. S. Army War College Press. pp. 145–188. ISBN 978-1-58487-574-1.
- Tin, Louis-Georges, ed. (November 2008). The Dictionary of Homophobia: A Global History of Gay & Lesbian Experience. Translated by Redburn, Marek. Arsenal Pulp Press. ISBN 978-1-55152-314-9.
- Turner, B., ed. (28 December 2016). The Statesman's Yearbook 2000. Palgrave Macmillan UK. p. 1236. ISBN 978-0-230-27128-9.
- "Uniformed Personnel Contributing Countries by Ranking" (PDF), United Nations Peacekeeping, 4 April 2023
- UN Women (13 November 2024). "Breaking tradition to end child marriage in Pakistan's remote village". UN Women.
- Vandamme, Dorothee (August 2014). ""Pakistan and Saudi Arabia: Towards Greater Independence in their Afghan Foreign Policy"". Université catholique de Louvain.
- van Tonder, Gerry (30 July 2018). Sino-Indian War: Border Clash: October–November 1962. Pen & Sword Books. ISBN 978-1-5267-2838-8.
- Visoka, Gëzim; Richmond, Oliver P., eds. (21 June 2022). The Palgrave Encyclopedia of Peace and Conflict Studies. Springer International Publishing. p. 305. ISBN 978-3-030-77954-2.
- Walk Free (13 June 2025). "Pakistan takes step to end child marriage as calls grow for national reform". Walk Free.
- Wasi, Nausheen (July 2005). "Pakistan and the United Nations". Pakistan Horizon. 58 (3). Karachi: Pakistan Institute of International Affairs: 89–100. ISSN 0030-980X. JSTOR 41394104.
- Wasti, Tahir (28 February 2009). The Application of Islamic Criminal Law in Pakistan: Sharia in Practice. Brill Publishers. p. 248. ISBN 978-90-474-2572-4.
- Wezeman, Pieter D.; Djokic, Katarina; George, Mathew; Hussain, Zain; Wezeman, Siemon T. (March 2024), "Trends in International Arms Transfers, 2023" (PDF), SIPRI
- Wiebes, Cees (2003). Intelligence and the War in Bosnia, 1992–1995: Volume 1 of Studies in intelligence history. LIT Verlag. p. 195. ISBN 978-3-8258-6347-0.
- Withington, Thomas (Autumn 2005). "The Experiences of the Soviet Air Force in Afghanistan 1979-1989". Air and Space Power Review. 8 (1). Royal Air Force: 115–128. ISSN 2634-0976.
- Wolf, Siegfried O. (20 June 2019). The China-Pakistan Economic Corridor of the Belt and Road Initiative: Concept, Context and Assessment. Springer International Publishing. p. 214. ISBN 978-3-030-16198-9.
- Wu, Chin-en; Bandyopadhyay, Kaustuv Kanti; Lee, Sook Jong, eds. (11 January 2021). Populism in Asian Democracies: Features, Structures, and Impacts. Brill Publishers. p. 82. ISBN 978-90-04-44446-1.
- Yadav, Abhishek (9 February 2024). "Turkiye–Pakistan Defence Cooperation: Evolving Dynamics". Manohar Parrikar Institute for Defence Studies and Analyses.
- Yousafzai, Zafar Iqbal (7 December 2021). The Troubled Triangle: US-Pakistan Relations Under the Taliban's Shadow. Taylor & Francis. ISBN 978-1-000-51596-1.
- Zahoor, Bilal; Rumi, Raza, eds. (23 September 2020). Rethinking Pakistan: A 21st Century Perspective. Anthem Press. p. 221. ISBN 978-1-78527-493-0.
- Zahra, Abiha; Bouckaert, Geert; Jadoon, Muhammad Zafar Iqbal; Jabeen, Nasira, eds. (10 June 2022). Public Sector Reforms in Pakistan: Hierarchies, Markets and Networks. Springer International Publishing. p. 43. ISBN 978-3-030-96825-0.
- Zaidi, Syed Muhammad Saad; Ahmad, Azhar (12 April 2021). "From friend to foe: Post-9/11 Pakistan–US relations; a realist perspective". Asian Journal of Comparative Politics. 7 (4). Sage Journals: 727–743. doi:10.1177/20578911211007936. ISSN 2057-8911.
- Zelnick, Robert (September 2013). Israel's Unilateralism: Beyond Gaza. Hoover Institution Press. p. 126. ISBN 978-0-8179-4773-6.
- Ziegfeld, Adam (19 February 2016). Why Regional Parties?: Clientelism, Elites, and the Indian Party System. Cambridge University Press. ISBN 978-1-316-53900-2.
- Zierke, Niklas; Stockmann, Reinhard; Meyer, Wolfgang, eds. (21 November 2023). The Institutionalisation of Evaluation in Asia-Pacific. Springer International Publishing. p. 274. ISBN 978-3-031-36918-6.
- Zreik, Mohamad, ed. (2024). Soft Power and Diplomatic Strategies in Asia and the Middle East. IGI Global. p. 209. ISBN 979-8-3693-2445-5.

=== Economy ===
- Abbas, Waheed (26 January 2026). "Pakistanis in UAE can continue using their home country SIMs without blocking". Khaleej Times.
- "Economic forecasts for Pakistan". Asian Development Bank. September 2025.
- "ADB Approves Financing for Transformative Reko Diq Copper Mining Project in Pakistan". Asian Development Bank. 22 August 2025.
- Ahmad, Mansoor (5 October 2024). "From leader to laggard: The decline of Pakistan's middle class". The News International.
- Akın, Songül; Gürsoy, Songül, eds. (19 June 2024). Best Crop Management and Processing Practices for Sustainable Cotton Production. IntechOpen. p. 109. ISBN 978-0-85014-009-5.
- Burki, Shahid Javed; Teekah, Ethan; Ziring, Lawrence (25 May 2026). "Economy of Pakistan". Britannica.com.
- Comim, Flavio; Anand, P. B.; Fennell, Shailaja, eds. (2021). Handbook of BRICS and Emerging Economies. Oxford University Press. p. 1080. ISBN 978-0-19-882753-5.
- Conte, Niccolo (17 October 2025). "Ranked: The World's 20 Largest Labor Forces, by Country". Visual Capitalist.
- "Initiating Thar coal project". Dawn. 25 August 2009.
- "Pakistani freelancers outearn regional rivals". Dawn. 30 May 2026.
- Henneberry, Shida Rastegari; Khan, Muhhamad Ehsan; Piewthongngam, Kullapapruk (2000). "An analysis of industrial–agricultural interactions: A case study in Pakistan" (PDF). Agricultural Economics. 22: 17–27. doi:10.1016/S0169-5150(99)00041-9 (inactive 13 July 2026). ISSN 0169-5150.
- Pakistan: Request for a Stand-by Arrangement-Press Release; Staff Report; Staff Statement; and Statement by the Executive Director for Pakistan. International Monetary Fund. 18 July 2023. p. 54. ISBN 979-8-4002-4851-1.
- "Pakistan: Datasets". IMF. International Monetary Fund. April 2026.
- "GDP, current prices Billions of U.S. dollars". IMF. International Monetary Fund. October 2026.
- "GDP per capita, current prices U.S. dollars per capita". IMF. International Monetary Fund. October 2026.
- "GDP, current prices Purchasing power parity; billions of international dollars". IMF. International Monetary Fund. October 2026.
- "GDP per capita, current prices Purchasing power parity; international dollars per capita". IMF. International Monetary Fund. October 2026.
- Iqbal, Nasir (June 2025). The Poverty Illusion: When Numbers Distort Reality (Report). PIDE Knowledge Brief. Pakistan Institute of Development Economics.
- Measuring digital development: The ICT Development Index 2026 (PDF) (Report). International Telecommunication Union. 2026. ISBN 978-92-61-42541-8.
- Jahanzaib, Muhammad (2026). The Interplay of Geo-Politics and Geo-Economics in Pakistan's Foreign Policy. Singapore: Springer Nature. p. 99. ISBN 978-981-9574-69-8.
- Kader, Adel A.; Siddiq, Muhammad; Aleid, Salah M., eds. (2013). Dates: Postharvest Science, Processing Technology and Health Benefits. John Wiley & Sons. ISBN 978-1-118-29244-0.
- Khan, Iqrar Ahmad; Khan, Muhammad Sarwar (17 April 2018). Developing Sustainable Agriculture in Pakistan. CRC Press. p. 854. ISBN 978-1-351-20822-2.
- Khan, Naimat (26 September 2025). "Pakistan's freelance economy could top $1 billion annually with stronger support — association". Arab News.
- Kiani, Khaleeq (26 March 2025). "Study confirms over $60bn copper and gold reserves at Reko Diq". Dawn.
- Maddison, Angus (18 September 2006). Development Centre Studies The World Economy: Volume 1: A Millennial Perspective and Volume 2: Historical Statistics. OECD Publishing. pp. 241, 261. ISBN 978-92-64-02261-4.
- "Barrick warns of 'significant increases' to budget, timeline for Pakistan copper project". Mining.com. 2 April 2026.
- Pakistan Economic Survey 2025–26 (PDF) (Report). Ministry of Finance. June 2026.
- "Pakistan". Observatory of Economic Complexity. Datawheel. 2023.
- Pasillas, Marcela Ramírez; Brundin, Ethel; Markowska, Magdalena, eds. (31 March 2017). Contextualizing Entrepreneurship in Emerging Economies and Developing Countries. Edward Elgar Publishing. p. 133. ISBN 978-1-78536-753-3.
- Pakistan Employment Trend Report 2025 (PDF). Pakistan Bureau of Statistics (Report). March 2026.
- Runde, Daniel (1 March 2016). "How U.S. Higher Education Partnerships Can Promote Development In Pakistan". Forbes.
- Saeed, Farhan; Suleria, Hafiz Ansar Rasul; Bader Ul Ain, Huma; Tufail, Tabussam, eds. (2026). Importance of Plant Based Byproducts: Nutritional and Functional Properties. Switzerland: Springer Nature. p. 289. ISBN 978-3-032-03503-5.
- Sharif, Shahzad; Javed, M. Siddique; Abbas, Azhar; Hassan, Sarfraz (Winter 2008). "Impact of WTO's Trade Liberalisation on Selected Food Crops in Pakistan" (PDF). The Pakistan Development Review. 47 (4, Part II). Islamabad: Pakistan Institute of Development Economics: 547–563. doi:10.30541/v47i4IIpp.547-563. ISSN 0030-9729. JSTOR 41261240.
- Shorrocks, Anthony; Davies, James B.; Lluberas, Rodrigo; Waldenström, Daniel (2023). Global Wealth Databook 2023 (Report). Credit Suisse Research Institute. p. 23.
- "PM pleased as remittances rise by 26.6pc to hit record $38.3bn in FY25". Special Investment Facilitation Council. 9 July 2025.
- The Global Economy (2023). "Pakistan: Percent of world exports". The Global Economy.
- "Human Development Insights". United Nations Development Programme. 2025.
- "Production - Wheat". United States Department of Agriculture, Foreign Agricultural Service. 2026.
- Global Gender Gap Report 2025 (PDF) (Report). Insight Report. World Economic Forum. June 2025. ISBN 978-2-940631-89-6.
- "Labor force participation rate, total (% of total population ages 15+) (modeled ILO estimate) - Pakistan". World Bank Data. World Bank. 2025.
- "International Debt Statistics". World Bank Data. World Bank. 2024.
- "Pakistan Trade Summary 2023 Data". World Bank. 2025.
