= List of countries by population in 2015 =

Historical demographics
Scene during a census
Articles
Demographic history
Historical demography
World population estimates
List of Countries by Population
2010	2015	2020

Political map of the Earth as of January 2015

This is a list of sovereign states and other territories by population, with population figures estimated for 2015 (rounded to the nearest 1,000). The figures are estimates for the United Nations (UN) "2015 annual statistics", which lists more than 100,000 population by country and territory.

The list includes all sovereign states and dependent territories recognized by the United Nations plus the territory under the effective control of the Republic of China (Taiwan).

This list adopts definitions of "country" on a case-by-case basis. The United Kingdom is considered as a single country while constituent countries of the Kingdom of the Netherlands are regarded separately.

Rank	Country / territory	Population 2015 (UN estimate)	Change from 2010*	Area (km^{2})	Population density
–	World	7,379,797,139	Steady		
1	China	1,376,048,943	Steady	9,596,961	143.4
2	India	1,311,050,527	Steady	3,287,263	398.8
3	United States	321,418,820	Steady	9,833,520	32.7
4	Indonesia	257,563,815	Steady	1,904,569	135.2
5	Brazil	207,847,528	Steady	8,515,767	24.4
6	Pakistan	188,924,874	Steady	881,913	214.2
7	Nigeria	182,201,962	Steady	923,768	197.2
8	Bangladesh	160,995,642	Steady	147,570	1091
9	Russia	143,456,918	Steady	17,075,200	8.4
10	Mexico	127,017,224	▲1	1,972,550	64.4
11	Japan	126,573,481	▼1	377,972	334.9
12	Philippines	100,981,437	Steady	343,448	294
13	Ethiopia	99,390,750	▲1	1,104,300	90
14	Vietnam	91,508,084	▼1	331,230.8	276.3
15	Egypt	83,483,000	▲1	1,010,408	82.6
16	Iran	79,109,272	Steady	1,648,195	48
17	Germany	78,728,000	▼1	357,168	220.4
18	Turkey	77,266,814	Steady	783,356	98.6
19	Democratic Republic of the Congo	76,244,544	Steady	2,345,409	32.5
20	Thailand	67,959,359	Steady	513,120	132.4
21	United Kingdom	64,715,810	▲1	242,495	266.9
22	France	64,395,345	▼1	640,679	100.5
23	Italy	60,340,328	▼1	301,338	200.2
24	Myanmar	59,780,000	Steady	676,578	88.4
25	South Africa	49,991,300	▲1	1,221,037	40.9
26	South Korea	49,410,366	▼1	100,210	493.1
27	Spain	45,989,016	▲2	505,990	90.9
28	Ukraine	45,782,592	▼1	603,628	75.8
29	Colombia	45,508,205	▲1	1,141,748	39.9
30	Tanzania	43,187,823	▲2	947,303	45.6
31	Sudan	42,338,426	▲2	1,886,068	22.4
32	Kenya	40,862,900	▲2	580,367	70.4
33	Argentina	40,518,951	▼3	2,780,400	14.6
34	Poland	38,167,329	▼3	312,679	122.1
35	Algeria	35,978,000	Steady	2,381,741	15.1
36	Canada	34,108,752	Steady	9,984,670	3.4
37	Iraq	32,481,000	▲3	437,072	74.3
38	Morocco	31,894,000	▼1	710,850	44.9
39	Uganda	31,784,600	Steady	241,038	131.9
40	Peru	29,461,933	▲1	1,285,216	22.9
41	Venezuela	28,833,845	▲2	716,445	40.2
42	Malaysia	28,334,135	▲3	330,803	85.7
43	Nepal	28,043,744	▼1	147,181	190.5
44	Uzbekistan	28,001,400	Steady	448,978	62.4
45	Saudi Arabia	27,136,977	▲1	2,149,690	12.6
46	Afghanistan	24,485,600	▼8	652,864	37.5
47	North Korea	24,325,701	Steady	120,540	201.8
48	Ghana	24,223,431	▲1	239,567	101.1
49	Taiwan	23,162,120	▼1	36,197	639.9
50	Yemen	23,153,982	▲1	527,968	43.9
51	Mozambique	22,416,881	▲4	801,590	28
52	Australia	22,299,800	▲1	7,692,024	2.9
53	Cote d'Ivoire	21,570,746	▲4	322,463	66.9
54	Romania	21,462,186	▼4	238,397	90
55	Sri Lanka	20,653,000	▼3	65,610	314.8
56	Syria	20,619,000	▼2	185,180	111.3
57	Madagascar	20,146,442	▼1	587,041	34.3
58	Cameroon	19,958,352	Steady	475,442	42
59	Angola	18,992,708	▲2	1,246,700	15.2
60	Chile	17,094,270	Steady	756,096	22.6
61	Netherlands	16,574,989	▼2	41,543	399
62	Kazakhstan	16,442,000	Steady	2,724,900	6
63	Burkina Faso	15,730,977	▲4	274,200	57.4
64	Mali	15,370,000	▲1	1,240,192	12.4
65	Niger	15,203,822	▼1	1,267,000	12
66	Ecuador	14,483,499	Steady	283,561	51.1
67	Guatemala	14,361,666	▲2	108,889	131.9
68	Cambodia	14,302,779	▼5	181,035	79
69	Malawi	13,947,592	▲1	118,484	117.7
70	Zambia	13,257,269	▼1	752,618	17.6
71	Zimbabwe	12,644,041	▼3	390,757	32.4
72	Senegal	12,509,434	Steady	196,712	63.6
73	Chad	11,714,904	▲8	1,284,000	9.1
74	Greece	11,305,118	Steady	131,957	85.7
75	Cuba	11,241,161	▼2	109,884	102.3
76	Belgium	10,839,905	▼1	30,528	355.1
77	Portugal	10,637,713	▲1	92,212	115.4
78	Tunisia	10,547,100	Steady	163,610	64.5
79	Czech Republic	10,506,813	▼2	78,866	133.2
80	Bolivia	10,426,154	▲4	1,098,581	9.5
81	Rwanda	10,412,820	▲5	26,338	395.4
82	Guinea	10,323,755	▲1	245,836	42
83	Hungary	10,014,324	▼4	93,030	107.6
84	Dominican Republic	9,884,371	▲3	48,315	204.6
85	Haiti	9,855,000	▲3	27,750	355.1
86	Belarus	9,480,178	▼4	207,595	45.7
87	Somalia	9,358,602	▲4	637,657	14.7
88	Sweden	9,340,682	▼3	450,295	20.7
89	Benin	9,211,741	Steady	114,763	80.3
90	Azerbaijan	8,997,586	Steady	86,600	103.9
91	Burundi	8,518,862	▲3	27,834	306.1
92	Austria	8,375,290	Steady	83,879	99.8
93	United Arab Emirates	8,264,070	▲24	83,600	98.9
94	Honduras	8,045,990	▲2	112,492	71.5
95	Switzerland	7,785,806	Steady	41,285	188.6
96	Israel	7,623,600	▲3	22,072	345.4
97	Tajikistan	7,616,400	▲3	143,100	53.2
98	Bulgaria	7,563,710	▼5	110,993.6	68.1
99	Serbia	7,291,436	▼19	77,474	94.1
100	Hong Kong	7,024,200	▼3	2,755	2549.6
101	Papua New Guinea	6,744,955	▲3	462,840	0
102	Libya	6,545,619	▲3	1,759,541	0
103	Paraguay	6,459,727	▼2	406,752	0
104	Laos	6,230,200	▼1	237,955	0
105	El Salvador	6,194,126	▼7	21,041	0
106	Togo	6,191,155	▼4	56,785	0
107	Jordan	6,113,000	▼1	89,341	0
108	Sierra Leone	5,835,664	Steady	71,740	0
109	Nicaragua	5,822,265	Steady	130,375	0
110	Denmark	5,534,738	Steady	42,931	0
111	Turkmenistan	5,479,800	▲3	491,210	0
112	Slovakia	5,424,925	▼1	49,035	0
113	Kyrgyzstan	5,418,300	▼1	199,951	0
114	Finland	5,351,427	▲1	338,424	0
115	Eritrea	5,223,994	▲4	117,600	0
116	Singapore	5,076,700	▲5	721.5	0
117	Norway	4,858,199	▼2	385,203	0
118	Costa Rica	4,563,539	▲2	51,180	0
119	Central African Republic	4,505,945	▲4	622,984	0
120	Ireland	4,467,854	▲3	70,273	0
121	Georgia	4,436,391	▼3	69,700	0
122	Croatia	4,425,747	▼6	56,594	0
123	New Zealand	4,367,800	▲1	268,021	0
124	Liberia	4,101,767	▲8	111,369	0
125	Palestine	4,048,403	▲3	6,020	0
126	Bosnia and Herzegovina	3,844,046	▲1	51,129	0
127	Lebanon	3,785,655	▲2	10,452	0
128	Republic of the Congo	3,758,678	▼3	342,000	0
129	Puerto Rico	3,721,978	▼3	9,104	0
130	Kuwait	3,566,437	▲7	17,818	0
131	Moldova	3,563,695		33,846	0
132	Panama	3,504,483		75,417	0
133	Uruguay	3,356,584		176,215	0
134	Lithuania	3,329,039		65,300	0
135	Armenia	3,249,482		29,743	0
136	Mauritania	3,217,383		1,030,000	0
137	Albania	3,195,000		28,748	0
138	Mongolia	2,780,800		1,566,000	0
139	Oman	2,773,479		309,500	0
140	Jamaica	2,701,200		10,991	0
141	Latvia	2,248,374		64,589	0
142	Namibia	2,212,037		825,615	0
143	Kosovo	2,208,107		10,908	0
144	Macedonia	2,052,722		25,713	0
145	Slovenia	2,046,976		20,273	0
146	Botswana	2,029,307		581,730	0
147	Lesotho	1,891,830		30,355	0
148	Gambia	1,750,732		10,689	0
149	Qatar	1,699,435		11,581	0
150	Guinea-Bissau	1,647,380		36,125	0
151	Gabon	1,501,266		267,667	0
152	Estonia	1,340,127		45,227	0
153	Trinidad and Tobago	1,317,714		5,131	0
154	Equatorial Guinea	1,313,000		28,050	0
155	Mauritius	1,283,415		2,040	0
156	Bahrain	1,234,571		765.3	0
157	Timor-Leste	1,149,028			0
158	Cyprus	1,102,677			0
159	Swaziland	1,055,506			0
160	Djibouti	879,053			0
161	Fiji	850,700			0
162	Réunion	828,054			0
163	Guyana	761,442			0
164	Bhutan	695,822			0
165	Comoros	675,000			0
166	Montenegro	616,411			0
167	Macau	552,300			0
168	Suriname	531,170			0
169	Solomon Islands	530,669			0
170	Western Sahara	530,000			0
171	Cape Verde	512,582			0
172	Luxembourg	502,066			0
173	Brunei	414,400			0
174	Malta	414,372			0
175	Guadeloupe	404,394			0
176	Martinique	399,637			0
177	Bahamas	353,658			0
178	Maldives	319,738			0
179	Iceland	317,630			0
180	Belize	312,971			0
181	Barbados	276,300			0
182	French Polynesia	267,000			0
183	New Caledonia	248,000			0
184	Vanuatu	245,036			0
185	French Guiana	232,223			0
186	Mayotte	202,000			0
187	Samoa	183,123			0
188	Guam	180,865			0
189	Saint Lucia	174,000			0
190	São Tomé and Príncipe	165,397			0
191	Curacao	142,180			0
192	Grenada	109,553			0
193	Saint Vincent and the Grenadines	109,284			0
194	U.S. Virgin Islands	106,267			0
195	Tonga	103,365			0
196	Micronesia	102,624			0
197	Aruba	101,484			0
198	Kiribati	100,835			0
*Change position from the list of countries by population in 2010

== See also ==
- List of sovereign states
- List of countries and dependencies by area
- List of countries and dependencies by population
- List of countries by past and projected future population
- List of countries by population in 1900
- List of countries by population in 2000
- List of countries by population in 2005
- List of continents and continental subregions by population
- List of religious populations
- World population
- Human geography
- United Nations
