= List of countries by population in 2020 =

Historical demographics
Scene during a census
Articles
Demographic history
Historical demography
World population estimates
List of countries by population
2015	2020	2025

This is a list of sovereign states and other territories by population in 2020.

The list includes all sovereign states and dependent territories recognized by the United Nations, plus the territory under the effective control of the Republic of China (Taiwan).

This list adopts definitions of "country" on a case-by-case basis. The "United Kingdom" is considered as a single country while constituent countries of the Kingdom of the Netherlands are regarded separately.

A numbered rank is assigned to the 193 member states of the United Nations, plus the two observer states to the United Nations General Assembly. Dependent territories and constituent countries that are parts of sovereign states are not assigned a numbered rank. In addition, sovereign states with limited recognition are also included, but not assigned a numbered rank.

List of countries and territories by total population
Country / territory	Population 2020 (UN estimate)	Notes
World	7,887,001,291	
China	1,426,106,093	(Note: Figure is for Mainland China only.)
India	1,402,617,696	
United States	339,436,159	
Indonesia	274,814,866	
Pakistan	235,001,746	
Nigeria	213,996,818	
Brazil	208,660,843	
Bangladesh	166,298,024	
Russia	146,371,299	
Mexico	126,799,055	
Japan	126,304,543	
Ethiopia	118,917,672	
Philippines	112,081,264	
Egypt	109,315,124	
Vietnam	98,079,191	
Democratic Republic of the Congo	95,989,998	
Iran	87,723,443	
Turkey	86,091,692	
Germany	83,628,709	
Thailand	71,641,484	
United Kingdom	67,351,862	
France	65,905,728	
Tanzania	60,927,789	
South Africa	60,562,381	
Italy	59,912,769	
Myanmar	53,016,522	
Kenya	52,217,334	
South Korea	51,858,482	
Colombia	50,629,998	
Spain	47,679,489	
Sudan	46,789,231	
Argentina	45,191,965	
Ukraine	44,680,015	
Uganda	44,457,153	
Algeria	44,042,091	
Iraq	42,116,605	
Afghanistan	39,068,979	
Canada	38,171,902	
Poland	38,171,012	
Morocco	36,584,208	
Yemen	36,134,864	
Malaysia	33,889,559	
Uzbekistan	33,586,372	
Angola	33,451,133	
Peru	32,858,580	
Ghana	31,887,809	
Saudi Arabia	30,991,207	
Mozambique	30,783,688	
Nepal	28,966,575	
Madagascar	28,953,557	
Ivory Coast	28,915,450	
Venezuela	28,444,078	
Cameroon	26,210,558	
North Korea	26,136,312	
Australia	25,743,791	
Niger	23,717,614	
Taiwan	23,663,459	
Sri Lanka	22,561,807	
Mali	21,713,838	
Burkina Faso	21,478,690	
Syria	21,049,929	
Malawi	19,533,888	
Kazakhstan	19,482,117	
Romania	19,392,469	
Chile	19,370,624	
Zambia	19,059,395	
Netherlands	17,663,184	(Note: Core state and constituent country within the Kingdom of the Netherlands. Figure includes the populations of the three special municipalities in the Caribbean: Bonaire, Sint Eustatius and Saba.)
Ecuador	17,546,045	
Guatemala	17,357,326	
Chad	17,224,679	
Senegal	16,789,220	
Cambodia	16,725,474	
Somalia	16,651,191	
Zimbabwe	15,526,889	
Guinea	13,371,183	
Benin	13,070,169	
Rwanda	13,065,837	
Burundi	12,617,036	
Tunisia	11,914,057	
Bolivia	11,860,300	
Belgium	11,540,107	
Haiti	11,243,848	
Cuba	11,376,540	
Dominican Republic	11,008,300	
Jordan	10,865,229	
Greece	10,699,369	
South Sudan	10,698,467	
Czech Republic	10,550,130	
Portugal	10,370,519	
Sweden	10,353,867	
Azerbaijan	10,181,730	
Honduras	10,119,641	
Papua New Guinea	9,815,746	
Hungary	9,749,467	
Tajikistan	9,749,311	
United Arab Emirates	9,448,524	
Belarus	9,350,949	
Austria	8,921,485	
Israel	8,800,376	
Togo	8,669,721	
Switzerland	8,640,582	
Sierra Leone	7,912,558	
Hong Kong (China)	7,490,236	(Note: Special administrative region of China.)
Laos	7,346,553	
Libya	7,045,399	
Turkmenistan	6,949,912	
Bulgaria	6,933,652	
Serbia	6,907,812	
Kyrgyzstan	6,664,107	
Paraguay	6,603,740	
Nicaragua	6,565,267	
El Salvador	6,234,674	
Denmark	5,831,530	
Republic of the Congo	5,752,791	
Lebanon	5,792,398	
Singapore	5,620,121	
Finland	5,529,612	
Slovakia	5,455,204	
Norway	5,379,279	
Liberia	5,149,464	
New Zealand	5,069,895	
Palestine	5,069,692	
Costa Rica	5,034,320	
Central African Republic	5,026,629	
Ireland	4,982,607	
Mauritania	4,600,131	
Oman	4,522,597	
Kuwait	4,400,144	
Panama	4,293,621	
Croatia	3,953,958	
Georgia	3,795,618	
Uruguay	3,396,968	
Bosnia and Herzegovina	3,299,350	
Eritrea	3,291,271	
Mongolia	3,290,786	
Puerto Rico (US)	3,275,805	(Note: Unincorporated U.S. territory.)
Moldova	3,069,131	
Armenia	2,890,893	
Albania	2,871,954	
Jamaica	2,830,739	
Qatar	2,803,375	
Lithuania	2,795,765	
Namibia	2,728,762	
The Gambia	2,515,734	
Botswana	2,365,894	
Gabon	2,322,539	
Lesotho	2,235,727	
Slovenia	2,102,420	
Guinea-Bissau	2,013,235	
Latvia	1,901,124	
North Macedonia	1,872,016	
Kosovo	1,751,417	
Equatorial Guinea	1,716,469	
Bahrain	1,483,077	
Trinidad and Tobago	1,481,024	
Estonia	1,329,670	
Timor-Leste	1,326,604	
Cyprus	1,302,248	
Mauritius	1,283,223	
Eswatini	1,192,730	
Djibouti	1,105,189	
Fiji	914,963	
Réunion (France)	861,446	(Note: Overseas department and region of France.)
Guyana	807,482	
Comoros	802,164	
Bhutan	770,006	
Solomon Islands	744,489	
Macau (China)	683,067	
Luxembourg	630,597	
Suriname	612,317	
Montenegro	607,935	
Western Sahara (disputed)	549,365	
Malta	518,207	
Cabo Verde	514,680	
Maldives	502,119	
Brunei	447,404	
Guadeloupe (France)	407,394	
The Bahamas	395,804	
Belize	390,812	
Iceland	366,614	
Martinique (France)	356,615	
Vanuatu	298,859	
French Guiana (France)	289,056	
Mayotte (France)	284,371	
New Caledonia (France)	284,177	(Note: Sui generis collectivity of France.)
Barbados	281,698	
French Polynesia (France)	279,209	(Note: Overseas country and collectivity of France.)
São Tomé and Príncipe	217,435	
Samoa	211,944	
Curaçao (Netherlands)	185,015	(Note: Constituent country within the Kingdom of the Netherlands.)
Saint Lucia	178,251	
Guam (US)	162,158	
Kiribati	126,099	
Seychelles	120,291	
Grenada	116,341	
Micronesia	110,917	
Aruba (Netherlands)	107,941	
Tonga	105,704	
Saint Vincent and the Grenadines	103,526	
Jersey (UK)	103,130	(Note: Self-governing British Crown Dependency.)
Antigua and Barbuda	91,846	
U.S. Virgin Islands (US)	87,707	
Isle of Man (UK)	84,064	
Andorra	77,380	
Cayman Islands (UK)	68,684	(Note: British Overseas Territory.)
Dominica	67,573	
Bermuda (UK)	64,382	
Guernsey (UK)	63,106	
Greenland (Denmark)	56,080	(Note: Autonomous territory within the Danish Realm.)
Faroe Islands (Denmark)	52,586	
American Samoa (US)	49,761	
Northern Mariana Islands (US)	47,528	
Saint Kitts and Nevis	46,870	
Turks and Caicos Islands (UK)	44,386	
Marshall Islands	42,706	
Sint Maarten (Netherlands)	41,008	
Liechtenstein	38,767	
Monaco	38,051	
British Virgin Islands (UK)	37,135	
Gibraltar (UK)	36,173	
San Marino	34,769	
Saint Martin (France)	31,786	(Note: Overseas collectivity of France.)
Palau	17,792	
Cook Islands (New Zealand)	15,643	(Note: Self-governing associated state of New Zealand.)
Anguilla (UK)	14,843	
Nauru	11,643	
Wallis and Futuna Islands (France)	11,616	
Saint Barthélemy (France)	10,543	
Tuvalu	10,400	
Saint Pierre and Miquelon (France)	5,827	
Saint Helena, Ascension and Tristan da Cunha (UK)	5,430	
Montserrat (UK)	4,508	
Falkland Islands (UK)	3,506	
Tokelau (New Zealand)	2,128	
Niue (New Zealand)	1,798	(Note: Dependent territory of New Zealand.)
Vatican City	528	

== See also ==
- List of sovereign states
- World population
