= List of countries by past and projected future population =

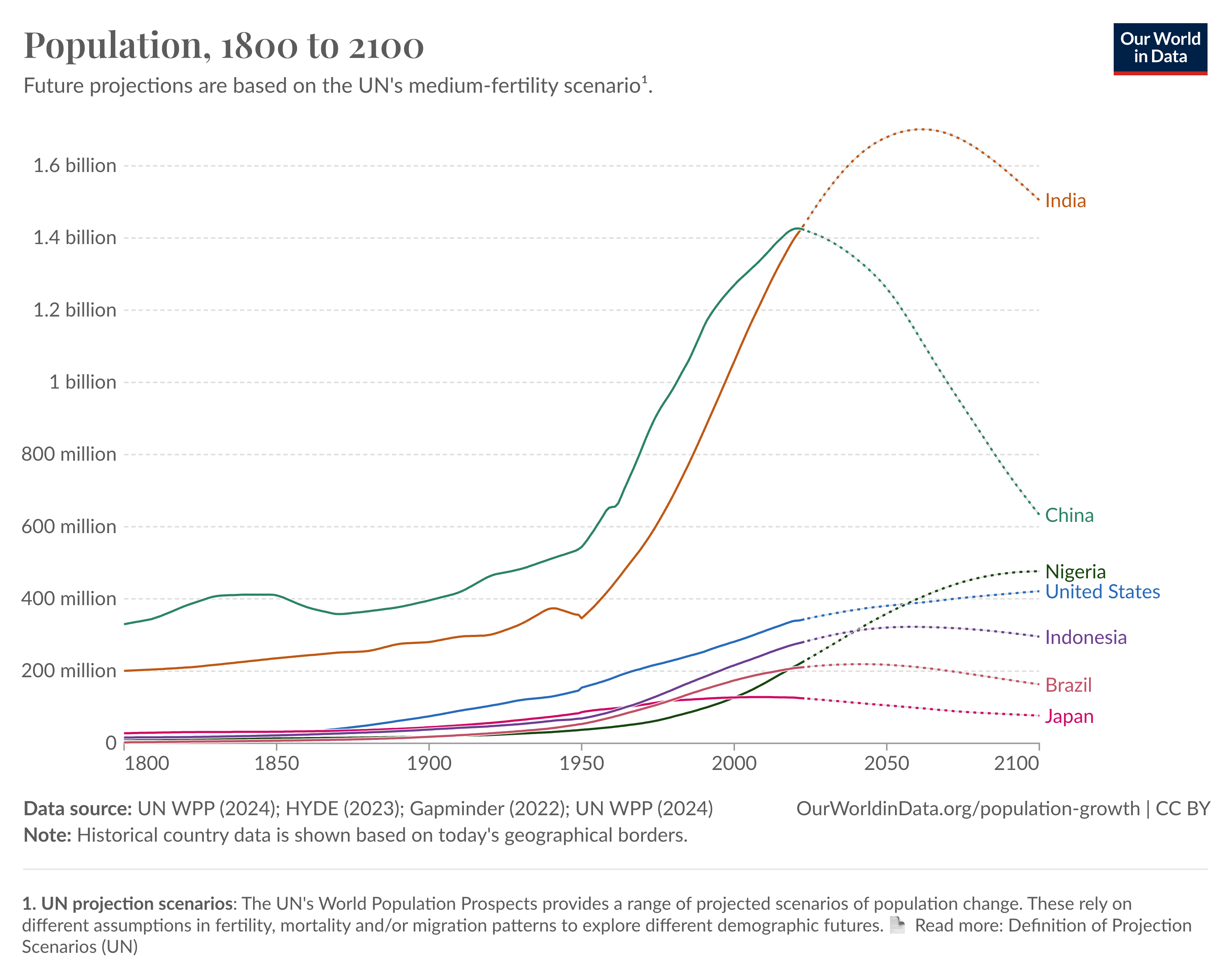
Population of the present-day top seven most-populous countries, 1800 to 2100. Future projections are based on the 2024 UN's medium-fertility scenario. Chart created by Our World In Data in 2024.

This article contains a list of countries by past and projected future population. This assumes that countries stay constant in the unforeseeable future, and does not take into account possible border changes.

== Overview ==
All the figures shown here have been sourced from the International Database (IDB) Division of the United States Census Bureau. Every individual value has been rounded to the nearest thousand, to assure data coherence, particularly when adding up (sub)totals. Although data from specific statistical offices may be more accurate, the information provided here has the advantage of being homogeneous.

Population estimates, as long as they are based on recent censuses, can be more easily projected into the near future than many macroeconomic indicators, such as GDP, which are much more sensitive to political and/or economic crises. This means that demographic estimates for the next five (or even ten) years can be more accurate than the projected evolution of GDP over the same time period (which may also be distorted by inflation).

However, no projected population figures can be considered exact. As the IDB states, "figures beyond the years 2020–2025 should be taken with caution", as the "census way towards those years has yet to be paved". Thus projections can be said to be looking through a kind of "cloudy glass" or a "misty window": realistically, the projections are "guesstimates".

To make matters more complicated, not all countries carry out censuses regularly, especially some of the poorer, faster-growing sub-Saharan African nations (whose evolution may be more interesting, from a demographer's point of view, than the "stagnated" populations of countries like Germany or Italy). The populations of many of these countries, as well as other primarily conservative, Islamic nations like Egypt, Iraq, and Pakistan, are growing much faster due to their high fertility rates than in the aging European nations or Japan.

On the other hand, some other countries, like the small Asian state of Bhutan, have only recently had a thorough census for the first time: In Bhutan's case in particular, before its national 2005 population survey, the IDB estimated its population at over 2 million; this was drastically reduced when the new census results proved to be 672,000.

Further, the IDB usually takes some time before including new data, as happened in the case of Indonesia. That country was reported by the IDB to have an inflated population of some 242 million by mid-2005, because it had not still processed the final results of the 2000 Indonesian census. There was a similar discrepancy with the relatively recent Ethiopian 2007 census, which gave a preliminary result of "only" 73,918,505 inhabitants.

The largest absolute potential discrepancies are naturally related to the most populous nations. However, smaller states, such as Tuvalu, can have large relative discrepancies. For instance, the 2002 census in that Oceanian island, which gave a final population of 9,561 shows that IDB estimates can be significantly off.

== Preliminary notes ==
The national 1 July, mid-year population estimates (usually based on past national censuses) supplied in these tables are given in thousands.

The retrospective figures use the present-day names and world political division: for example, the table gives data for each of the 15 republics of the former Soviet Union, as if they had already been independent in 1950. The opposite is the case for Germany, which had been divided since the end of the Second World War but was reunified on October 3, 1990.

Other issues concerning some countries or territories are as follows:

- Burma is the traditional English name for (the Union of) Myanmar, as used by the United States Census Bureau.
- The Democratic Republic of the Congo, formerly known as Zaire from 1971 to 1997, is referred to as Congo (Kinshasa) in the IDB database (to differentiate it from the Republic of the Congo whose capital is the city of Brazzaville).
- The population figures for France include the five overseas departments of French Guiana, Guadeloupe, Martinique, Mayotte, and Réunion, but exclude Saint Barthélemy and the French part of Saint Martin, which split from Guadeloupe in 2007.
- The former British colony of Hong Kong and former Portuguese colony of Macau continue to have their own figures, even though they returned to Chinese sovereignty in 1997 and 1999 respectively. The Chinese government considers both these present-day Special Administrative Regions (SARs) as separate entities from a statistical point of view, and their censuses are still carried out on different dates from mainland China.
- About half the population of the British Caribbean colony of Montserrat (in the Lesser Antilles) was evacuated in 1995, following a volcanic eruption that severely damaged its capital, the town of Plymouth.
- (Palestine) Although no figures are given for the Palestinian territories as a whole, data is supplied for both the Gaza Strip and the West Bank.
- (Serbia) The Serbian population refers only to that of the "residual" Yugoslav republic under that name, after secession of Montenegro (Crna Gora) and, more recently, Kosovo (the latter being recognized as an independent state by the United States government on 18 February 2008, the U.S. Census Bureau reflects the resulting demographic change; nevertheless, many countries have not recognized this declaration of independence).

Finally, the Eastern and Western Europe subtotals follow the former Cold War's Iron Curtain division of Europe.

== Formulas used to calculate demographic growth ==
To the right of each year column (except for the initial 1950 one), a percentage figure is shown, which gives the average annual growth for the previous five-year period. Thus, the figures after the 1960 column show the percentage annual growth for the 1955-60 period; the figures after the 1980 column calculate the same value for 1975–80; and so on.

The formulas used for the annual growth rates are the standard ones, used both by the United Nations Statistics Division and by National Census Offices worldwide. They are compound growth rates, and have the general form:

$\left ( \sqrt[y_f-y_i]{\frac{p_f}{p_i}} -1 \right ) \times 100$

where $p_i$ and $p_f$ stand for the initial and final population, respectively, within a stated time period. Similarly $y_i$ and $y_f$ are the dates of the initial and final years.

In the calculations shown here, all periods are of five years, so y_{i} + 5 = y_{f} and the formula simplifies to:

$\left ( \sqrt[5]{\frac{p_f}{p_i}} -1 \right ) \times 100$.

== UN Forecast 2024 ==
World Population Share Projections (2024): 1. India (17.8%); 2. China (17.6%); 3. United States (4.21%); 4. Indonesia (3.45%); 5. Pakistan (3.02%); 6. Nigeria (2.82%); 7. Brazil (2.68%); 8. Bangladesh (2.15%); 9. Other (46.4%)	World Population Share Projections (2030): 1. India (17.7%); 2. China (16.6%); 3. United States (4.12%); 4. Indonesia (3.42%); 5. Pakistan (3.21%); 6. Nigeria (3.07%); 7. Brazil (2.62%); 8. Bangladesh (2.16%); 9. Other (47.1%)	World Population Share Projections (2050): 1. India (17.2%); 2. China (13.5%); 3. Nigeria (3.89%); 4. United States (3.87%); 5. Pakistan (3.79%); 6. Indonesia (3.27%); 7. Brazil (2.38%); 8. DR Congo (2.24%); 9. Other (49.8%)	World Population Share Projections (2100): 1. India (14.8%); 2. China (6.12%); 3. Nigeria (5.28%); 4. Pakistan (4.71%); 5. DR Congo (4.18%); 6. United States (3.81%); 7. Ethiopia (3.13%); 8. Indonesia (2.87%); 9. Other (55.1%)

Below is a list of countries and regions of the world with their projected population, as estimated by the UN Department of Economic and Social Affairs, as of July 11, 2022. The Medium variant of the forecast for July 1, 2024, July 1, 2030, July 1, 2050 and July 1, 2100 is given.

Country (or dependent territory)	2024	2030	2050	2100
World	8,118,836,000	8,546,141,000	9,709,492,000	10,349,323,000
Asia	4,785,060,000	4,958,807,000	5,292,948,000	4,674,249,000
Africa	1,494,994,000	1,710,666,000	2,485,136,000	3,924,421,000
Sub-Saharan Africa	1,226,534,000	1,417,346,000	2,111,548,000	3,442,347,000
Central Asia and South Asia	2,128,585,000	2,258,687,000	2,580,042,000	2,559,659,000
South Asia	2,049,313,000	2,173,354,000	2,475,947,000	2,433,583,000
East Asia and Southeast Asia	2,354,122,000	2,372,658,000	2,312,468,000	1,652,016,000
North Africa and Western Asia	570,814,000	620,782,000	774,025,000	944,647,000
East Asia	1,661,450,000	1,647,994,000	1,522,820,000	911,277,000
Southeast Asia	692,671,000	724,664,000	789,648,000	740,740,000
Latin America and the Caribbean	669,973,000	697,585,000	749,169,000	647,400,000
Europe	741,652,000	736,574,000	703,007,000	586,515,000
North Africa	268,460,000	293,321,000	373,587,000	482,073,000
Western Asia	302,354,000	327,462,000	400,437,000	462,574,000
North America	381,048,000	393,297,000	421,398,000	448,026,000
South America	442,861,000	460,220,000	491,079,000	425,794,000
Central America	182,236,000	191,252,000	210,341,000	181,688,000
Central Asia	79,271,000	85,333,000	104,095,000	126,077,000
Oceania	46,109,000	49,212,000	57,834,000	68,712,000
Caribbean	44,876,000	46,113,000	47,749,000	39,917,000
Oceania (excluding Australia and New Zealand)	14,140,000	15,514,000	19,693,000	24,553,000
Afghanistan	42,647,492	50,039,402	76,885,134	130,216,739
Albania	2,791,765	2,671,885	2,240,166	1,184,997
Algeria	46,814,308	50,154,166	59,565,554	64,487,527
American Samoa	46,765	42,958	37,545	32,293
Andorra	81,938	85,682	82,195	47,222
Angola	37,885,849	45,160,458	74,295,394	150,045,574
Anguilla	14,598	14,977	14,552	9,309
Antigua and Barbuda	93,772	96,000	95,055	67,975
Argentina	45,696,159	46,585,022	48,308,944	38,255,990
Armenia	2,973,840	2,851,291	2,495,207	1,692,198
Aruba	108,066	107,864	100,002	75,170
Australia	26,713,205	28,188,539	32,506,969	43,143,685
Austria	9,120,813	9,080,346	8,724,332	7,399,328
Azerbaijan	10,336,578	10,665,380	11,224,923	10,021,320
Bahamas	401,283	410,266	424,265	384,955
Bangladesh	174,701,211	184,424,144	203,904,900	176,366,038
Barbados	282,309	283,082	267,788	203,022
Bahrain	1,607,049	1,765,209	2,139,464	3,090,323
Belize	416,656	450,428	538,838	562,797
Belarus	9,455,037	9,206,170	8,409,632	6,469,457
Belgium	11,715,774	11,873,460	12,090,657	11,521,156
Benin	14,080,072	16,393,827	25,264,035	46,617,384
Bermuda	63,935	62,806	56,041	36,985
Bolivia	12,567,336	13,625,507	16,609,854	18,861,521
Bonaire	27,272	27,904	28,735	28,971
Bulgaria	6,618,615	6,290,166	5,187,392	2,943,542
Bosnia and Herzegovina	3,194,378	3,111,789	2,739,014	1,739,032
Botswana	2,719,694	2,972,271	3,679,340	4,177,614
Brazil	217,637,297	223,908,968	230,885,725	184,547,593
British Virgin Islands	31,763	32,995	34,768	31,668
Brunei	455,858	473,312	498,373	404,521
Burkina Faso	23,840,247	27,523,563	40,541,548	61,539,300
Burundi	13,591,657	15,800,530	24,208,671	39,388,467
Bhutan	792,382	821,498	874,294	654,430
United Kingdom	67,961,439	69,175,770	71,684,966	70,485,072
Hungary	9,994,993	9,642,912	8,817,396	6,929,830
United States Virgin Islands	98,055	93,419	77,519	37,962
Gabon	2,484,557	2,774,523	3,757,053	5,268,088
Haiti	11,867,030	12,700,006	15,087,520	16,109,408
Guyana	819,594	848,033	878,746	632,627
Gambia	2,841,803	3,263,651	4,673,743	6,667,396
Ghana	34,777,522	38,775,850	52,231,785	72,826,468
Guadeloupe	396,346	399,728	388,861	318,692
Guatemala	18,358,430	20,003,638	24,600,727	26,170,739
Guinea-Bissau	2,197,149	2,484,863	3,445,289	4,765,962
Guinea	14,528,770	16,622,388	23,711,700	34,178,283
Germany	83,252,474	82,762,675	78,932,228	68,936,102
Guernsey	63,788	65,141	66,496	56,453
Gibraltar	32,718	32,771	31,356	23,865
Honduras	10,759,406	11,724,522	14,258,514	15,166,663
Palestine	5,494,963	6,256,949	8,861,747	12,805,184
Grenada	126,887	130,367	136,253	115,630
Greenland	56,789	57,152	53,997	40,586
Greece	10,302,720	10,059,703	9,144,951	6,380,722
Georgia	3,717,425	3,657,494	3,384,660	2,366,909
Guam	174,114	180,746	195,673	183,221
Denmark	5,939,695	6,104,474	6,445,109	7,093,770
Jersey	112,843	119,047	135,441	161,397
Djibouti	1,152,329	1,247,129	1,502,575	1,676,909
Dominica	73,368	74,988	74,167	52,912
Dominican Republic	11,434,005	11,982,523	13,180,541	11,908,081
Egypt	114,484,252	125,151,725	160,339,889	205,225,076
Western Sahara	598,385	662,726	851,067	1,121,874
Israel	9,311,652	10,134,951	12,991,790	18,410,403
India	1,441,719,852	1,514,994,080	1,670,490,596	1,529,850,119
Indonesia	279,798,049	292,150,100	317,225,213	296,623,475
Jordan	11,384,922	11,933,395	15,005,941	17,625,253
Iraq	46,523,657	52,800,825	74,515,140	111,503,537
Iran	89,809,781	92,921,017	99,007,204	79,906,390
Ireland	5,089,478	5,266,881	5,724,686	5,722,314
Iceland	377,689	390,338	408,783	368,486
Spain	47,473,373	47,076,573	44,219,565	30,880,752
Italy	58,697,744	57,544,258	52,250,484	36,874,247
North Korea	26,244,582	26,569,401	25,807,197	20,473,590
Cape Verde	604,461	638,840	727,457	667,365
Kazakhstan	19,828,165	21,128,221	25,609,978	34,093,330
Cayman Islands	69,885	72,865	77,633	78,712
Cambodia	17,121,847	18,084,248	20,258,435	19,118,804
Cameroon	29,394,433	34,051,103	51,279,560	87,093,219
Canada	39,107,046	41,008,596	45,890,819	53,903,779
Qatar	2,737,061	2,855,291	3,358,454	4,379,295
Kenya	56,203,030	63,103,942	85,211,739	112,525,079
Cyprus	1,268,467	1,311,784	1,391,785	1,337,053
Kiribati	135,763	148,720	188,570	238,673
Hong Kong	7,496,681	7,485,887	6,975,391	4,852,441
Macau	713,082	763,371	881,666	1,031,184
China	1,425,178,782	1,415,605,906	1,312,636,325	633,368,108
Colombia	52,340,774	54,129,764	56,987,651	45,837,096
Comoros	867,605	959,412	1,246,207	1,570,166
Democratic Republic of the Congo	105,625,114	127,582,053	217,494,003	432,378,400
Republic of the Congo	6,244,547	7,114,987	10,378,912	17,181,630
Kosovo	1,667,483	1,690,888	1,669,913	944,539
Costa Rica	5,246,714	5,432,243	5,702,525	4,533,000
Ivory Coast	29,603,302	34,211,272	51,358,243	89,366,995
Cuba	11,174,587	11,016,041	10,028,085	6,478,341
Kuwait	4,349,380	4,564,570	5,155,414	4,895,806
Kyrgyzstan	6,839,606	7,435,378	9,426,858	11,975,365
Curaçao	192,965	197,829	204,084	193,807
Lao People's Democratic Republic	7,736,681	8,321,287	9,775,552	9,694,234
Latvia	1,810,240	1,701,338	1,433,728	954,183
Lesotho	2,356,083	2,501,946	2,898,369	2,967,268
Liberia	5,536,949	6,282,074	8,890,700	13,226,140
Lebanon	5,219,044	4,714,240	4,937,579	4,745,074
Libya	6,964,197	7,394,813	8,539,976	8,473,050
Lithuania	2,692,798	2,558,928	2,187,550	1,503,077
Liechtenstein	39,822	41,030	42,287	41,474
Luxembourg	661,594	697,086	781,910	879,481
Mauritius	1,301,978	1,305,425	1,226,235	846,900
Mauritania	4,993,922	5,830,563	8,914,673	15,450,985
Madagascar	31,056,610	35,604,443	51,592,965	83,316,557
Mayotte	345,996	407,579	664,141	1,356,379
Malawi	21,475,962	24,944,243	37,159,300	58,521,719
Malaysia	34,671,895	36,687,569	41,032,433	39,474,474
Mali	24,015,789	28,712,294	47,439,802	87,079,523
Maldives	517,887	512,683	569,909	469,441
Malta	536,740	543,425	522,737	386,365
Morocco	38,211,459	40,226,395	45,044,990	43,933,296
Martinique	366,416	362,472	330,121	230,357
Marshall Islands	42,415	44,733	51,211	50,977
Mexico	129,388,467	134,534,107	143,772,364	115,626,629
Mozambique	34,858,402	40,920,707	63,044,497	106,196,946
Republic of Moldova	3,329,865	3,174,727	2,997,532	2,457,142
Monaco	36,157	35,862	37,664	50,858
Mongolia	3,493,629	3,736,327	4,518,856	5,257,218
Montserrat	4,372	4,301	3,781	2,575
Burma	54,964,694	56,987,625	59,929,399	52,417,687
Namibia	2,645,805	2,910,056	3,779,918	5,018,497
Nauru	12,884	13,358	14,695	12,380
Nepal	31,240,315	33,133,395	37,401,365	33,769,507
Niger	28,238,972	35,217,942	67,043,296	167,008,298
Nigeria	229,152,217	262,580,426	377,459,883	546,091,662
Netherlands	17,671,125	17,943,803	17,897,025	16,580,142
Nicaragua	7,142,529	7,688,686	9,094,641	9,138,044
Niue	1,935	1,948	2,096	2,225
New Zealand	5,269,939	5,495,670	5,949,002	6,069,341
New Caledonia	295,966	312,529	353,191	366,575
Norway	5,514,477	5,748,397	6,367,559	7,219,859
United Arab Emirates	9,591,853	10,004,319	11,449,471	14,089,004
Oman	4,713,553	5,093,376	6,328,978	7,838,991
Isle of Man	84,904	85,798	86,680	88,338
Cook Islands	17,072	17,253	17,674	16,764
Wallis and Futuna	11,439	11,229	11,349	9,887
Pakistan	245,209,815	274,029,836	367,808,468	487,017,405
Palau	18,051	17,919	16,689	14,005
Panama	4,527,961	4,864,126	5,736,121	6,206,167
Papua New Guinea	10,515,788	11,615,322	14,910,369	18,548,056
Paraguay	6,947,270	7,425,448	8,591,486	8,605,016
Peru	34,683,444	36,702,393	42,022,554	42,102,154
Poland	40,221,726	38,700,518	34,932,339	23,082,363
Portugal	10,223,349	10,062,183	9,261,305	6,885,463
Puerto Rico	3,268,802	3,259,722	2,727,624	1,274,146
South Korea	51,741,963	51,290,214	45,770,874	24,102,932
Réunion	989,350	1,031,822	1,127,252	1,113,971
Russia	143,957,079	141,432,741	133,133,035	112,068,747
Rwanda	14,414,910	16,375,704	23,030,046	33,811,630
Romania	19,618,996	19,023,383	17,457,213	13,105,206
United States	341,814,420	352,162,301	375,391,963	394,041,155
El Salvador	6,396,289	6,554,224	6,636,854	4,284,249
Samoa	228,966	248,627	320,016	441,188
San Marino	33,614	33,458	32,044	26,093
São Tomé and Príncipe	236,381	265,036	366,663	531,758
Saint Lucia	180,805	183,274	177,856	121,531
Saudi Arabia	37,473,929	40,461,368	48,374,543	50,468,334
Saint Helena, Ascension and Tristan da Cunha	5,253	4,895	3,874	2,803
Saint Barthélemy	11,019	11,113	10,210	5,153
Saint Vincent and the Grenadines	103,683	104,322	101,691	72,701
Saint Martin	32,337	33,508	35,453	34,465
Vatican City	526	561	731	1,237
North Macedonia	2,082,706	2,072,256	1,909,309	1,209,753
Northern Mariana Islands	50,025	51,178	50,050	41,446
Seychelles	108,263	111,317	116,644	103,654
Senegal	18,221,567	21,125,872	32,562,869	62,054,836
Saint Kitts and Nevis	47,847	48,247	46,882	35,941
Saint Pierre and Miquelon	5,815	5,651	5,165	3,615
Serbia	7,097,028	6,832,604	5,777,806	3,266,060
Singapore	6,052,709	6,251,988	6,337,235	5,446,430
Sint Maarten	44,309	44,946	38,947	26,082
Syria	24,348,053	29,824,735	38,306,374	43,472,700
Slovakia	5,702,832	5,555,114	5,186,967	3,854,319
Slovenia	2,118,965	2,105,945	2,003,258	1,666,113
Solomon Islands	756,673	856,264	1,225,407	2,003,495
Somalia	18,706,922	22,316,857	36,462,830	66,335,733
Sudan	49,358,228	56,997,099	84,494,269	141,996,160
Suriname	628,785	659,508	725,519	705,343
Sierra Leone	8,977,972	10,105,188	13,595,023	16,965,728
Tajikistan	10,331,513	11,421,430	15,200,989	20,398,913
Thailand	71,885,799	72,060,018	67,880,083	44,570,978
Republic of China	23,950,214	24,027,999	22,445,526	15,241,961
Tanzania	69,419,073	81,885,304	129,931,520	244,819,886
Timor-Leste	1,379,883	1,495,081	1,806,869	1,804,542
Togo	9,260,864	10,558,178	15,478,883	26,980,350
Tokelau	1,915	2,046	2,430	2,805
Tonga	108,683	114,124	131,225	129,891
Trinidad and Tobago	1,538,200	1,547,690	1,485,139	1,055,540
Tuvalu	11,478	11,917	13,211	14,207
Tunisia	12,564,689	13,100,768	14,315,779	13,530,731
Turks and Caicos Islands	46,431	48,538	52,865	55,676
Turkmenistan	6,598,071	7,034,758	8,263,833	8,814,388
Turkey	86,260,417	88,879,698	95,829,258	82,549,012
Uganda	49,924,252	58,380,262	87,622,081	132,127,044
Uzbekistan	35,673,804	38,313,228	45,593,149	50,794,586
Ukraine	37,937,821	38,295,429	32,867,719	20,432,787
Uruguay	3,423,316	3,423,372	3,337,143	2,409,371
Faroe Islands	53,444	54,583	59,444	68,513
Federated States of Micronesia	116,300	122,704	135,457	115,353
Fiji	943,072	986,172	1,094,174	1,048,164
Philippines	119,106,224	129,453,321	157,891,622	180,147,660
Finland	5,549,886	5,565,475	5,460,917	5,023,926
Falkland Islands	3,803	3,869	3,779	2,773
France	64,881,830	65,543,452	65,827,072	60,851,673
French Guiana	319,796	366,669	532,459	928,830
French Polynesia	311,383	324,860	346,933	281,829
Croatia	3,986,627	3,850,140	3,333,425	2,113,899
Central African Republic	5,915,627	7,104,274	11,533,423	18,793,631
Chad	18,847,148	22,460,393	36,452,035	65,152,512
Montenegro	626,102	621,696	586,385	429,267
Czech Republic	10,503,734	10,515,199	10,577,126	11,172,303
Chile	19,658,839	19,933,769	20,675,378	16,798,533
Switzerland	8,851,431	9,143,698	9,753,753	10,439,548
Sweden	10,673,669	11,007,228	11,902,033	13,187,841
Sri Lanka	21,949,268	22,186,970	21,814,985	14,694,772
Ecuador	18,377,367	19,486,952	22,269,779	21,448,228
Equatorial Guinea	1,754,993	1,999,678	2,790,533	3,855,777
Eritrea	3,817,651	4,283,355	5,964,021	8,575,294
Eswatini	1,222,075	1,305,985	1,655,121	1,992,790
Estonia	1,319,041	1,289,441	1,171,695	835,708
Ethiopia	129,719,719	149,296,378	214,812,309	323,741,600
South Africa	61,020,221	64,659,278	73,529,753	74,559,590
South Sudan	11,277,092	12,570,402	17,460,846	23,720,027
Japan	122,631,432	118,514,802	103,784,357	73,644,064
Jamaica	2,824,738	2,804,356	2,493,823	897,072
Vanuatu	342,325	391,135	578,567	1,019,379
Venezuela	29,395,334	32,027,461	35,937,404	35,353,213
Vietnam	99,497,680	102,699,905	107,012,939	91,036,732
Yemen	35,219,853	39,923,245	55,296,331	74,176,034
Zambia	21,314,956	25,024,901	38,083,385	64,473,916
Zimbabwe	16,634,373	18,610,348	25,866,385	37,166,572

0.

== Estimates between 1950 and 1980 (in thousands) ==
Country (or dependent territory)	1950	1955	%	1960	%	1965	%	1970	%	1975	%	1980	%
Afghanistan	8,151	8,892	1.76	9,830	2.03	10,998	2.27	12,431	2.48	14,133	2.60	15,045	1.26
Albania	1,228	1,393	2.56	1,624	3.12	1,884	3.02	2,157	2.74	2,402	2.17	2,672	2.16
Algeria	8,893	9,842	2.05	10,910	2.08	11,964	1.86	13,932	3.09	16,141	2.99	18,807	3.10
American Samoa	20	20	0.72	21	0.20	25	4.23	28	2.08	30	1.68	33	1.80
Andorra	7	7	0.04	9	6.28	14	10.17	20	7.49	27	6.32	34	4.81
Angola	4,118	4,424	1.44	4,798	1.64	5,135	1.37	5,606	1.77	6,051	1.54	7,206	3.56
Anguilla	6	6	0.80	6	0.79	6	0.75	7	0.80	7	0.68	7	0.64
Antigua and Barbuda	46	52	2.19	55	1.32	60	1.70	66	2.05	69	0.73	69	0.15
Argentina	17,151	18,928	1.99	20,617	1.72	22,284	1.57	23,963	1.46	26,082	1.71	28,370	1.70
Armenia	1,356	1,566	2.92	1,869	3.61	2,206	3.37	2,520	2.70	2,835	2.38	3,134	2.03
Aruba	50	54	1.62	58	1.21	60	0.63	60	0.01	60	0.06	60	0.23
Australia	8,268	9,278	2.33	10,362	2.24	11,440	2.00	12,661	2.05	13,772	1.70	14,616	1.20
Austria	6,936	6,947	0.03	7,048	0.29	7,271	0.63	7,468	0.53	7,579	0.30	7,550	-0.08
Azerbaijan	2,886	3,314	2.81	3,882	3.21	4,567	3.31	5,169	2.51	5,697	1.96	6,199	1.70
Bahamas	71	88	4.33	113	5.19	140	4.40	171	4.12	190	2.12	210	2.09
Bahrain	115	131	2.55	157	3.76	192	4.09	220	2.78	259	3.34	348	6.08
Bangladesh	45,646	49,589	1.67	54,593	1.94	60,285	2.00	67,332	2.24	76,153	2.49	87,938	2.92
Barbados	211	228	1.53	233	0.44	235	0.23	239	0.32	248	0.69	252	0.39
Belarus	7,723	7,781	0.15	8,168	0.98	8,591	1.01	9,028	1.00	9,361	0.73	9,644	0.60
Belgium	8,640	8,869	0.52	9,119	0.56	9,449	0.71	9,638	0.40	9,795	0.32	9,847	0.11
Belize	66	77	3.17	92	3.62	107	3.09	123	2.68	136	2.13	145	1.27
Benin	1,673	1,847	1.99	2,056	2.17	2,311	2.37	2,620	2.54	2,996	2.72	3,459	2.91
Bermuda	39	42	1.30	45	1.36	49	2.01	53	1.43	54	0.46	55	0.33
Bhutan	164	187	2.61	213	2.63	255	3.69	310	4.01	373	3.80	447	3.66
Bolivia	2,767	3,075	2.14	3,435	2.24	3,854	2.33	4,347	2.44	4,915	2.49	5,442	2.06
Bosnia and Herzegovina	2,663	2,975	2.24	3,241	1.73	3,494	1.52	3,704	1.17	3,981	1.45	4,093	0.56
Botswana	431	462	1.39	497	1.50	539	1.61	584	1.65	705	3.83	901	5.03
Brazil	53,444	61,652	2.90	71,412	2.98	82,602	2.95	94,931	2.82	107,328	2.49	121,064	2.44
British Virgin Islands	7	7	1.13	8	2.26	9	2.64	10	3.17	11	1.40	11	0.87
Brunei	45	61	6.28	84	6.37	103	4.28	128	4.49	157	4.14	186	3.46
Bulgaria	7,251	7,500	0.68	7,868	0.96	8,202	0.84	8,490	0.69	8,721	0.54	8,844	0.28
Burkina Faso	4,377	4,615	1.07	4,866	1.07	5,032	0.67	5,304	1.06	5,674	1.36	6,319	2.18
Burundi	2,363	2,577	1.75	2,816	1.79	3,171	2.41	3,522	2.12	3,677	0.86	4,298	3.17
Cambodia	4,472	5,049	2.46	5,762	2.68	6,602	2.76	7,395	2.29	7,500	0.28	6,889	-1.69
Cameroon	4,888	5,211	1.29	5,609	1.48	6,104	1.71	6,727	1.96	7,522	2.26	8,756	3.09
Canada	14,012	16,051	2.75	18,267	2.62	20,072	1.90	21,750	1.62	23,210	1.31	24,594	1.17
Cape Verde	147	170	2.93	197	3.07	232	3.32	269	3.02	281	0.85	297	1.12
Cayman Islands	7	7	2.04	8	1.95	9	2.37	11	3.17	15	7.03	18	3.85
Central African Republic	1,260	1,349	1.37	1,468	1.71	1,628	2.09	1,840	2.48	2,058	2.27	2,349	2.68
Chad	2,608	2,806	1.47	3,043	1.64	3,345	1.91	3,728	2.19	4,145	2.14	4,523	1.76
Chile	6,091	6,744	2.06	7,586	2.38	8,510	2.33	9,369	1.94	10,208	1.73	10,999	1.50
China	562,580	607,047	1.53	651,340	1.42	716,667	1.93	822,116	2.78	920,295	2.28	987,822	1.43
Colombia	11,592	13,589	3.23	15,953	3.26	18,647	3.17	21,430	2.82	24,125	2.40	26,632	2.00
Comoros	149	164	2.03	183	2.24	207	2.44	237	2.81	276	3.07	340	4.27
Cook Islands	15	17	2.18	18	1.95	20	1.30	21	1.78	20	-1.58	19	-1.30
Costa Rica	867	1,032	3.54	1,249	3.88	1,488	3.57	1,736	3.13	1,992	2.79	2,300	2.91
Croatia	3,838	3,956	0.61	4,037	0.40	4,134	0.48	4,206	0.35	4,256	0.23	4,384	0.59
Cuba	5,785	6,382	1.98	7,028	1.95	7,810	2.13	8,543	1.81	9,291	1.69	9,653	0.77
Curaçao	102	112	2.04	124	2.04	134	1.59	145	1.56	150	0.60	148	-0.16
Cyprus	495	533	1.52	579	1.68	601	0.72	628	0.90	627	-0.03	631	0.12
Czech Republic	8,926	9,366	0.97	9,660	0.62	9,777	0.24	9,796	0.04	10,043	0.50	10,289	0.49
Democratic Republic of the Congo	13,569	14,953	1.96	16,611	2.13	18,856	2.57	21,781	2.93	25,033	2.82	29,011	2.99
Denmark	4,272	4,440	0.77	4,582	0.63	4,759	0.76	4,929	0.71	5,060	0.53	5,124	0.25
Djibouti	80	91	2.67	112	4.26	143	5.00	180	4.83	227	4.72	327	7.61
Dominica	52	57	1.93	60	1.13	64	1.29	70	1.81	74	1.16	74	-0.01
Dominican Republic	2,353	2,738	3.07	3,232	3.38	3,806	3.33	4,423	3.05	5,049	2.68	5,697	2.45
Ecuador	3,370	3,843	2.66	4,416	2.82	5,118	2.99	5,940	3.02	6,872	2.96	7,921	2.88
Egypt	21,198	23,856	2.39	26,847	2.39	30,266	2.43	33,575	2.10	36,953	1.94	42,635	2.90
El Salvador	1,940	2,222	2.75	2,582	3.05	3,018	3.17	3,604	3.61	4,073	2.48	4,571	2.33
Equatorial Guinea	212	226	1.35	244	1.54	253	0.72	271	1.36	214	-4.64	257	3.72
Eritrea	1,403	1,499	1.34	1,615	1.50	1,747	1.58	2,161	4.35	2,422	2.30	2,569	1.19
Estonia	1,096	1,155	1.05	1,211	0.96	1,288	1.24	1,364	1.14	1,433	0.99	1,483	0.69
Eswatini	278	312	2.34	352	2.48	400	2.57	456	2.64	521	2.73	612	3.26
Ethiopia	20,175	21,991	1.74	24,169	1.91	26,741	2.04	29,469	1.96	32,976	2.27	36,037	1.79
Faroe Islands	32	33	0.69	35	1.26	38	1.29	39	0.85	41	1.13	44	1.26
Federated States of Micronesia	31	36	3.12	42	3.12	49	3.12	57	3.12	67	3.11	78	3.08
Fiji	288	333	2.94	394	3.44	464	3.33	522	2.37	577	2.03	635	1.95
Finland	4,009	4,235	1.10	4,430	0.90	4,564	0.60	4,607	0.19	4,712	0.45	4,780	0.29
France	42,540	44,243	0.79	46,612	1.05	49,834	1.35	51,955	0.84	53,998	0.77	55,164	0.43
French Polynesia	63	72	2.97	82	2.44	95	3.15	115	3.78	134	3.15	151	2.54
Gabon	416	429	0.62	447	0.79	475	1.24	515	1.64	648	4.70	714	1.97
Gambia	272	307	2.46	352	2.81	412	3.20	485	3.30	566	3.14	653	2.90
Georgia	3,516	3,828	1.71	4,147	1.62	4,465	1.49	4,695	1.01	4,898	0.85	5,046	0.60
Germany	68,375	70,196	0.53	72,481	0.64	75,639	0.86	77,784	0.56	78,683	0.23	78,298	-0.10
Ghana	5,298	6,049	2.69	6,959	2.84	8,010	2.85	8,789	1.87	10,100	2.82	11,153	2.00
Gibraltar	23	24	0.58	25	0.49	26	0.88	27	0.72	30	2.05	29	-0.15
Greece	7,567	7,966	1.03	8,328	0.89	8,551	0.53	8,793	0.56	9,047	0.57	9,643	1.28
Greenland	23	27	3.59	33	4.09	40	3.83	47	3.44	50	1.32	51	0.25
Grenada	76	85	2.22	91	1.27	94	0.69	96	0.45	96	0.09	91	-1.21
Guam	60	69	2.78	67	-0.53	75	2.07	87	3.14	103	3.38	107	0.92
Guatemala	2,969	3,488	3.27	4,100	3.29	4,746	2.97	5,265	2.10	5,911	2.34	6,650	2.38
Guernsey	46	47	0.36	47	0.33	51	1.31	54	1.25	54	0.16	54	-0.13
Guinea	2,586	2,787	1.51	3,027	1.66	3,314	1.83	3,644	1.91	4,019	1.98	4,448	2.05
Guinea-Bissau	574	592	0.64	617	0.82	604	-0.42	621	0.53	681	1.89	789	2.99
Guyana	428	492	2.79	572	3.06	641	2.31	715	2.23	768	1.45	760	-0.23
Haiti	3,098	3,365	1.67	3,697	1.90	4,094	2.06	4,541	2.09	4,974	1.84	5,508	2.06
Honduras	1,432	1,663	3.03	1,952	3.26	2,330	3.60	2,761	3.46	2,858	0.69	3,403	3.55
Hong Kong	2,238	2,491	2.17	3,076	4.31	3,598	3.19	3,960	1.93	4,396	2.12	5,064	2.87
Hungary	9,339	9,826	1.02	9,984	0.32	10,153	0.34	10,338	0.36	10,532	0.37	10,712	0.34
Iceland	143	159	2.03	176	2.16	193	1.80	205	1.20	219	1.33	229	0.91
India	369,881	404,268	1.79	445,394	1.96	494,964	2.13	553,889	2.28	618,923	2.25	684,888	2.05
Indonesia	82,979	90,255	1.70	100,146	2.10	110,754	2.03	122,292	2.00	135,214	2.03	150,322	2.14
Iran	16,358	18,739	2.76	21,600	2.88	25,040	3.00	28,995	2.98	33,468	2.91	39,709	3.48
Iraq	5,164	5,904	2.71	6,823	2.94	7,971	3.16	9,414	3.38	11,118	3.38	13,233	3.54
Ireland	2,964	2,917	-0.32	2,833	-0.58	2,877	0.31	2,951	0.51	3,178	1.49	3,402	1.37
Isle of Man	55	52	-1.40	48	-1.34	49	0.52	53	1.43	60	2.44	65	1.54
Israel	1,287	1,771	6.60	2,139	3.84	2,573	3.77	2,895	2.39	3,342	2.91	3,721	2.17
Italy	47,106	48,634	0.64	50,198	0.64	51,988	0.70	53,662	0.64	55,572	0.70	56,452	0.31
Ivory Coast	2,861	3,165	2.04	3,577	2.48	4,357	4.03	5,580	5.07	7,031	4.73	8,594	4.09
Jamaica	1,385	1,489	1.46	1,632	1.85	1,778	1.72	1,944	1.81	2,105	1.61	2,229	1.15
Japan	83,806	89,816	1.39	94,092	0.93	98,883	1.00	104,345	1.08	111,574	1.35	116,808	0.92
Jersey	57	60	1.04	63	1.02	67	1.04	70	0.80	73	0.94	76	0.88
Jordan	562	689	4.17	853	4.36	1,069	4.62	1,516	7.25	1,822	3.75	2,190	3.75
Kazakhstan	6,694	7,977	3.57	9,983	4.59	11,903	3.58	13,107	1.95	14,158	1.55	15,000	1.16
Kenya	6,122	7,034	2.82	8,157	3.01	9,550	3.20	11,248	3.33	13,434	3.62	16,331	3.98
Kiribati	34	37	1.99	41	1.99	45	1.90	49	1.78	54	1.71	58	1.57
Kosovo	762	854	2.32	947	2.10	1,079	2.63	1,220	2.49	1,370	2.35	1,522	2.13
Kuwait	145	187	5.21	293	9.38	477	10.26	748	9.44	1,007	6.14	1,370	6.35
Kyrgyzstan	1,739	1,902	1.80	2,172	2.69	2,574	3.45	2,964	2.87	3,301	2.18	3,632	1.93
Laos	1,886	2,078	1.95	2,310	2.14	2,566	2.12	2,845	2.09	3,162	2.13	3,294	0.82
Latvia	1,937	2,003	0.67	2,116	1.10	2,254	1.28	2,362	0.94	2,462	0.84	2,525	0.51
Lebanon	1,365	1,561	2.73	1,787	2.73	2,058	2.87	2,384	2.98	2,693	2.47	2,902	1.51
Lesotho	727	787	1.60	859	1.78	953	2.10	1,068	2.30	1,196	2.30	1,359	2.59
Liberia	824	929	2.41	1,055	2.59	1,209	2.76	1,397	2.93	1,617	2.97	1,858	2.81
Libya	962	1,123	3.15	1,338	3.57	1,624	3.95	2,000	4.25	2,569	5.14	3,061	3.57
Liechtenstein	14	15	1.72	17	2.25	19	2.65	22	2.42	24	2.10	26	1.38
Lithuania	2,554	2,615	0.47	2,765	1.13	2,960	1.37	3,138	1.18	3,306	1.05	3,436	0.78
Luxembourg	296	305	0.61	314	0.60	332	1.09	340	0.46	359	1.14	365	0.30
Macau	206	193	-1.27	187	-0.70	224	3.77	262	3.15	255	-0.54	256	0.11
Madagascar	4,621	5,003	1.60	5,482	1.85	6,071	2.06	6,766	2.19	7,604	2.36	8,692	2.71
Malawi	2,817	3,089	1.86	3,451	2.24	3,915	2.55	4,509	2.87	5,318	3.36	6,258	3.31
Malaysia	6,434	7,312	2.59	8,429	2.88	9,648	2.74	10,911	2.49	12,131	2.14	13,461	2.10
Maldives	80	81	0.21	93	2.86	98	1.17	115	3.22	133	2.97	153	2.88
Mali	3,688	4,072	2.00	4,495	2.00	4,978	2.06	5,547	2.19	6,218	2.31	6,869	2.01
Malta	312	315	0.15	329	0.88	320	-0.58	326	0.40	328	0.14	365	2.11
Marshall Islands	11	13	3.32	16	3.32	18	3.32	22	4.05	27	4.00	31	3.03
Mauritania	1,006	1,054	0.93	1,118	1.19	1,196	1.35	1,290	1.53	1,405	1.72	1,545	1.93
Mauritius	482	572	3.50	664	3.02	756	2.64	830	1.89	886	1.31	964	1.71
Mexico	28,486	32,930	2.94	38,579	3.22	45,143	3.19	52,776	3.17	60,679	2.83	68,348	2.41
Moldova	2,337	2,623	2.34	2,999	2.72	3,334	2.14	3,595	1.52	3,847	1.36	3,997	0.77
Monaco	19	19	0.17	21	2.57	23	1.59	24	1.12	26	1.13	27	1.11
Mongolia	779	845	1.63	955	2.49	1,091	2.69	1,248	2.73	1,446	2.99	1,656	2.75
Montenegro	396	432	1.76	462	1.35	492	1.25	515	0.94	550	1.31	561	0.40
Montserrat	14	13	-1.08	13	-0.99	12	-0.62	12	-0.32	13	0.90	12	-0.59
Morocco	9,344	10,782	2.90	12,424	2.88	14,067	2.51	15,910	2.49	17,688	2.14	19,488	1.96
Mozambique	6,251	6,782	1.64	7,473	1.96	8,302	2.13	9,305	2.31	10,433	2.32	12,103	3.01
Myanmar	19,488	21,050	1.55	22,840	1.64	24,938	1.77	27,393	1.90	30,330	2.06	33,337	1.91
Namibia	464	522	2.39	591	2.51	671	2.58	765	2.65	916	3.66	1,059	2.94
Nauru	4	4	1.38	5	4.01	6	4.44	7	3.80	8	1.17	8	1.66
Nepal	8,990	9,480	1.07	10,035	1.15	10,863	1.60	11,919	1.87	13,156	1.99	14,666	2.20
Netherlands	10,121	10,759	1.23	11,494	1.33	12,302	1.37	13,043	1.18	13,665	0.94	14,156	0.71
New Caledonia	56	65	3.36	79	3.94	91	2.77	113	4.39	134	3.50	140	0.94
New Zealand	1,909	2,137	2.28	2,372	2.11	2,641	2.17	2,829	1.38	3,118	1.97	3,171	0.33
Nicaragua	1,098	1,278	3.07	1,493	3.17	1,751	3.24	2,053	3.24	2,395	3.13	2,804	3.20
Niger	3,272	3,560	1.70	3,913	1.91	4,344	2.11	4,841	2.19	5,420	2.28	6,094	2.37
Nigeria	31,797	35,955	2.49	41,551	2.94	48,068	2.96	55,591	2.95	64,428	2.99	74,829	3.04
North Korea	9,472	8,864	-1.32	10,448	3.34	11,965	2.75	14,062	3.28	16,015	2.63	17,391	1.66
North Macedonia	1,225	1,341	1.82	1,367	0.39	1,470	1.47	1,575	1.39	1,685	1.35	1,793	1.25
Northern Mariana Islands	7	8	3.52	9	3.47	11	3.38	13	3.38	15	3.86	17	2.49
Norway	3,266	3,428	0.97	3,582	0.88	3,724	0.78	3,878	0.82	4,008	0.66	4,086	0.39
Oman	489	540	2.02	602	2.17	682	2.55	784	2.81	921	3.28	1,186	5.20
Pakistan	40,383	45,536	2.43	51,719	2.58	59,047	2.69	67,492	2.71	76,457	2.53	85,220	2.19
Palau	8	9	2.72	10	2.72	11	2.72	13	2.06	13	1.35	14	0.73
Palestine	1,018	1,055	0.72	1,115	1.11	1,212	1.68	1,033	-3.15	1,201	3.06	1,361	2.53
Panama	893	1,011	2.52	1,148	2.57	1,326	2.93	1,532	2.92	1,750	2.70	1,960	2.30
Papua New Guinea	1,413	1,546	1.81	1,719	2.15	1,941	2.46	2,214	2.67	2,505	2.50	2,847	2.60
Paraguay	1,476	1,684	2.67	1,910	2.55	2,171	2.59	2,477	2.68	2,849	2.83	3,172	2.17
Peru	7,633	8,672	2.59	9,932	2.75	11,468	2.92	13,193	2.84	15,162	2.82	17,296	2.67
Philippines	21,132	24,336	2.86	28,026	2.86	32,391	2.94	37,253	2.84	42,406	2.63	48,290	2.63
Poland	24,825	27,221	1.86	29,590	1.68	31,263	1.11	32,527	0.80	33,970	0.87	35,579	0.93
Portugal	8,443	8,693	0.58	9,037	0.78	9,129	0.20	9,045	-0.19	9,412	0.80	9,778	0.77
Puerto Rico	2,219	2,251	0.29	2,359	0.94	2,597	1.95	2,722	0.94	2,936	1.52	3,210	1.80
Qatar	26	36	6.94	46	5.13	71	9.21	113	9.99	165	7.85	230	6.85
Republic of the Congo	827	904	1.81	1,003	2.09	1,124	2.32	1,273	2.52	1,456	2.72	1,676	2.86
Romania	16,312	17,326	1.21	18,404	1.22	19,028	0.67	20,253	1.26	21,246	0.96	22,131	0.82
Russia	101,937	111,126	1.74	119,632	1.49	126,542	1.13	130,246	0.58	134,294	0.61	139,039	0.70
Rwanda	2,440	2,699	2.04	3,032	2.36	3,265	1.49	3,770	2.92	4,357	2.94	5,140	3.36
Saint Barthélemy	3	3	0.62	3	0.63	3	1.12	3	1.00	3	1.05	3	2.90
Saint Helena, Ascension and Tristan da Cunha	6	6	0.05	6	0.21	6	0.24	6	1.07	7	1.33	7	1.30
Saint Kitts and Nevis	45	50	2.31	52	0.56	49	-0.87	47	-1.17	45	-0.62	44	-0.51
Saint Lucia	80	86	1.66	88	0.43	95	1.42	103	1.77	113	1.82	123	1.73
Saint Martin	3	4	4.07	5	4.08	5	2.50	6	2.40	7	2.91	8	3.80
Saint Pierre and Miquelon	5	5	0.40	5	0.98	6	0.63	6	1.52	6	1.41	6	0.40
Saint Vincent and the Grenadines	67	76	2.58	82	1.43	86	0.98	88	0.57	93	1.06	99	1.25
Samoa	82	94	2.77	111	3.23	128	2.93	143	2.28	151	1.17	160	1.06
San Marino	13	14	1.59	16	2.19	18	2.49	20	1.96	20	0.57	22	1.69
São Tomé and Príncipe	60	61	0.17	64	1.03	69	1.62	74	1.40	82	2.08	95	2.88
Saudi Arabia	3,860	4,244	1.91	4,719	2.15	5,328	2.46	6,110	2.78	7,208	3.36	10,022	6.81
Senegal	2,654	2,927	1.98	3,270	2.24	3,744	2.75	4,318	2.89	4,990	2.93	5,612	2.38
Serbia	5,957	6,314	1.17	6,659	1.07	6,959	0.88	7,249	0.82	7,432	0.50	7,588	0.42
Seychelles	33	36	1.74	42	3.04	48	2.78	55	2.52	60	1.96	64	1.41
Sierra Leone	2,088	2,233	1.36	2,397	1.43	2,582	1.50	2,790	1.56	3,031	1.67	3,336	1.93
Singapore	1,023	1,306	5.02	1,647	4.75	1,887	2.76	2,075	1.91	2,263	1.75	2,414	1.30
Sint Maarten	3	3	1.73	3	1.72	5	8.64	7	9.63	11	9.89	13	3.64
Slovakia	3,464	3,727	1.48	3,995	1.40	4,370	1.81	4,524	0.69	4,730	0.89	4,966	0.98
Slovenia	1,468	1,518	0.67	1,558	0.53	1,621	0.79	1,676	0.68	1,723	0.55	1,834	1.26
Solomon Islands	107	115	1.43	127	1.99	144	2.50	164	2.65	194	3.44	231	3.64
Somalia	2,438	2,674	1.86	2,956	2.03	3,283	2.12	3,667	2.24	4,128	2.40	5,794	7.02
South Africa	13,596	15,369	2.48	17,417	2.53	19,899	2.70	22,740	2.71	25,816	2.57	29,252	2.53
South Korea	20,846	21,552	0.67	24,785	2.83	28,706	2.98	32,242	2.35	35,282	1.82	38,125	1.56
South Sudan	2,707	2,757	0.37	2,809	0.37	2,862	0.37	2,915	0.37	3,396	3.10	4,668	6.57
Spain	28,063	29,319	0.88	30,642	0.89	32,085	0.92	33,877	1.09	35,564	0.98	37,489	1.06
Sri Lanka	7,534	8,694	2.91	9,914	2.66	11,261	2.58	12,619	2.30	13,780	1.78	15,056	1.79
Sudan	6,468	7,391	2.71	8,447	2.71	9,653	2.71	11,031	2.71	12,708	2.87	14,784	3.07
Suriname	209	241	2.93	285	3.41	337	3.42	373	2.06	363	-0.52	355	-0.48
Sweden	7,015	7,263	0.70	7,481	0.59	7,734	0.67	8,043	0.79	8,193	0.37	8,311	0.29
Switzerland	4,695	4,981	1.19	5,363	1.49	5,944	2.08	6,268	1.07	6,404	0.43	6,386	-0.06
Syria	3,496	3,938	2.41	4,531	2.84	5,323	3.27	6,253	3.27	7,398	3.42	8,740	3.39
Taiwan	7,982	9,486	3.51	11,210	3.39	12,978	2.97	14,599	2.38	16,123	2.01	17,849	2.06
Tajikistan	1,531	1,781	3.08	2,081	3.16	2,511	3.83	2,939	3.20	3,449	3.25	3,967	2.84
Tanzania	7,935	8,971	2.48	10,260	2.72	11,871	2.96	13,807	3.07	16,148	3.18	18,654	2.93
Thailand	20,042	23,452	3.19	27,513	3.25	32,062	3.11	37,091	2.96	42,273	2.65	47,026	2.15
Timor-Leste	436	473	1.63	509	1.51	554	1.69	598	1.55	677	2.51	558	-3.81
Togo	1,172	1,299	2.07	1,456	2.32	1,648	2.51	1,965	3.57	2,267	2.91	2,626	2.98
Tonga	46	55	3.55	64	3.19	75	3.08	84	2.30	90	1.43	92	0.58
Trinidad and Tobago	633	721	2.66	842	3.14	940	2.23	956	0.33	1,007	1.06	1,091	1.61
Tunisia	3,518	3,847	1.80	4,150	1.53	4,566	1.93	5,099	2.23	5,704	2.27	6,444	2.47
Turkey	21,122	24,145	2.71	28,218	3.17	31,951	2.52	35,759	2.28	40,530	2.54	45,048	2.14
Turkmenistan	1,205	1,348	2.28	1,585	3.29	1,883	3.50	2,182	2.99	2,524	2.96	2,876	2.64
Turks and Caicos Islands	6	6	0.49	6	2.10	6	0.15	6	-0.53	7	2.86	8	2.91
Tuvalu	5	5	1.19	6	1.19	6	1.14	6	0.86	7	1.33	8	3.72
Uganda	5,522	6,318	2.73	7,262	2.83	8,390	2.93	9,716	2.98	10,761	2.06	12,020	2.24
Ukraine	36,775	39,369	1.37	42,645	1.61	45,235	1.19	47,236	0.87	48,974	0.73	50,047	0.43
United Arab Emirates	72	83	2.95	104	4.49	144	6.89	250	11.64	523	15.95	1,001	13.87
United Kingdom	50,128	50,947	0.32	52,373	0.55	54,351	0.74	55,633	0.47	56,216	0.21	56,315	0.04
United States	151,869	165,070	1.68	179,980	1.74	193,527	1.46	203,985	1.06	215,466	1.10	227,225	1.07
United States Virgin Islands	27	28	0.52	33	3.32	44	6.00	64	7.85	95	8.28	100	1.07
Uruguay	2,195	2,354	1.41	2,531	1.47	2,694	1.25	2,824	0.95	2,844	0.14	2,931	0.60
Uzbekistan	6,293	7,233	2.82	8,532	3.36	10,206	3.65	11,941	3.19	13,988	3.22	15,994	2.72
Vanuatu	53	59	2.43	67	2.43	75	2.34	86	2.85	100	3.14	117	3.22
Venezuela	5,010	6,171	4.26	7,557	4.14	9,068	3.71	10,759	3.48	12,675	3.33	14,768	3.10
Vietnam	25,349	27,739	1.82	31,657	2.68	37,259	3.31	42,577	2.70	48,076	2.46	53,716	2.24
Wallis and Futuna	7	8	1.26	8	1.26	9	1.02	9	0.95	9	0.23	11	4.18
Western Sahara	10	16	11.87	28	11.87	50	12.33	90	12.38	73	-4.16	125	11.47
Yemen	4,778	5,266	1.97	5,872	2.20	6,511	2.09	7,099	1.74	7,935	2.25	9,133	2.85
Zambia	2,554	2,870	2.36	3,255	2.55	3,695	2.57	4,241	2.80	4,849	2.71	5,541	2.71
Zimbabwe	2,854	3,410	3.62	4,011	3.31	4,686	3.16	5,515	3.31	6,342	2.83	7,170	2.49
World	2,557,629	2,782,099	1.70	3,043,002	1.81	3,350,426	1.94	3,712,698	2.07	4,089,084	1.95	4,451,363	1.71

== Estimates between 1985 and 2015 (in thousands) ==
Country (or dependent territory)	1985	%	1990	%	1995	%	2000	%	2005	%	2010	%	2015	%
Afghanistan	13,120	-2.70	13,569	0.67	19,446	7.46	22,462	2.93	26,335	3.23	29,121	2.03	32,565	2.26
Albania	2,957	2.05	3,245	1.88	3,159	-0.54	3,159	0.00	3,025	-0.86	2,987	-0.25	3,030	0.28
Algeria	22,009	3.19	25,191	2.74	28,322	2.37	30,639	1.58	32,918	1.45	35,950	1.78	39,543	1.92
American Samoa	39	3.57	48	4.09	54	2.69	58	1.39	57	-0.28	56	-0.53	55	-0.41
Andorra	45	5.84	53	3.41	64	3.70	66	0.58	77	3.18	85	2.12	86	0.25
Angola	8,390	3.09	9,486	2.48	11,000	3.01	12,683	2.89	14,770	3.09	17,043	2.90	19,626	2.86
Anguilla	7	1.35	9	3.84	10	3.20	12	3.02	14	2.80	15	2.40	17	2.14
Antigua and Barbuda	65	-1.24	65	-0.07	69	1.38	76	1.86	82	1.53	87	1.31	93	1.28
Argentina	30,290	1.57	33,036	1.50	35,274	1.32	37,336	1.14	39,182	0.97	41,344	1.08	43,432	0.99
Armenia	3,465	2.02	3,530	0.37	3,131	-2.37	3,101	-0.19	3,085	-0.10	3,072	-0.08	3,057	-0.10
Australia	15,696	1.44	16,957	1.56	17,976	1.17	19,054	1.17	20,233	1.21	21,516	1.24	22,752	1.12
Austria	7,560	0.03	7,723	0.43	8,048	0.83	8,114	0.16	8,315	0.49	8,448	0.32	8,666	0.51
Azerbaijan	6,846	2.00	7,498	1.84	8,051	1.43	8,464	1.00	8,826	0.84	9,302	1.06	9,781	1.01
Bahamas	229	1.70	246	1.44	266	1.59	283	1.28	297	0.98	311	0.91	325	0.90
Bahrain	424	4.02	506	3.62	583	2.85	655	2.38	916	6.94	1,181	5.20	1,347	2.68
Bangladesh	102,309	3.07	112,213	1.87	121,443	1.59	132,151	1.70	144,139	1.75	156,119	1.61	168,958	1.59
Barbados	258	0.42	263	0.39	268	0.41	274	0.45	281	0.46	286	0.40	291	0.34
Belarus	9,982	0.69	10,201	0.43	10,205	0.01	10,034	-0.34	9,807	-0.46	9,681	-0.26	9,590	-0.19
Belgium	9,859	0.02	9,970	0.22	10,156	0.37	10,264	0.21	10,470	0.40	10,866	0.75	11,324	0.83
Belize	166	2.77	191	2.89	218	2.62	249	2.69	282	2.55	315	2.26	348	2.01
Benin	4,031	3.11	4,706	3.15	5,647	3.71	6,620	3.23	7,778	3.28	9,057	3.09	10,449	2.90
Bermuda	57	0.53	58	0.56	61	0.86	64	0.90	66	0.89	69	0.70	71	0.56
Bhutan	530	3.48	615	3.04	567	-1.63	606	1.36	655	1.57	700	1.34	742	1.17
Bolivia	5,935	1.75	6,574	2.07	7,375	2.33	8,196	2.13	9,073	2.06	9,948	1.86	10,801	1.66
Bosnia and Herzegovina	4,227	0.65	4,315	0.41	3,547	-3.85	3,806	1.42	3,894	0.46	3,885	-0.04	3,868	-0.09
Botswana	1,080	3.70	1,265	3.21	1,478	3.16	1,680	2.60	1,841	1.84	2,030	1.98	2,183	1.47
Brazil	135,734	2.31	149,410	1.94	161,912	1.62	174,316	1.49	186,021	1.31	195,835	1.03	204,260	0.85
British Virgin Islands	14	3.69	16	3.54	20	3.97	23	3.38	26	2.82	30	2.76	34	2.45
Brunei	218	3.30	253	3.03	288	2.63	326	2.47	362	2.11	396	1.81	430	1.69
Bulgaria	8,944	0.23	8,895	-0.11	8,285	-1.41	7,909	-0.92	7,612	-0.76	7,392	-0.58	7,187	-0.56
Burkina Faso	7,171	2.56	8,362	3.12	9,903	3.44	11,588	3.19	13,904	3.71	16,242	3.16	18,932	3.11
Burundi	4,915	2.72	5,509	2.31	5,800	1.03	6,716	2.98	7,789	3.01	9,121	3.21	10,743	3.33
Cambodia	7,842	2.62	9,368	3.62	11,235	3.70	12,352	1.91	13,298	1.49	14,454	1.68	15,709	1.68
Cameroon	10,227	3.15	11,984	3.22	13,828	2.90	15,818	2.73	18,132	2.77	20,823	2.81	23,740	2.66
Canada	25,942	1.07	27,791	1.39	29,691	1.33	31,100	0.93	32,387	0.81	33,760	0.83	35,100	0.78
Cape Verde	317	1.34	340	1.40	386	2.55	431	2.22	471	1.81	509	1.57	546	1.43
Cayman Islands	21	4.06	27	4.80	33	4.27	39	3.42	45	2.90	51	2.52	57	2.24
Central African Republic	2,715	2.93	3,085	2.59	3,545	2.82	3,980	2.34	4,364	1.86	4,845	2.12	5,392	2.16
Chad	5,067	2.30	5,842	2.89	6,770	2.99	7,943	3.25	9,401	3.43	10,544	2.32	11,632	1.98
Chile	11,953	1.68	13,008	1.71	14,173	1.73	15,175	1.38	15,980	1.04	16,760	0.96	17,509	0.88
China	1,061,876	1.46	1,153,164	1.66	1,221,056	1.15	1,268,302	0.76	1,302,285	0.53	1,336,681	0.52	1,367,486	0.46
Colombia	29,748	2.24	33,148	2.19	36,532	1.96	38,911	1.27	41,488	1.29	44,206	1.28	46,737	1.12
Comoros	383	2.42	431	2.37	483	2.32	546	2.46	624	2.71	707	2.53	781	2.04
Cook Islands	18	-0.58	19	1.01	19	-0.09	17	-2.29	14	-3.57	12	-3.31	10	-3.05
Costa Rica	2,645	2.84	3,024	2.71	3,445	2.64	3,883	2.42	4,209	1.63	4,517	1.42	4,815	1.29
Croatia	4,458	0.34	4,509	0.23	4,497	-0.05	4,411	-0.38	4,496	0.38	4,487	-0.04	4,465	-0.10
Cuba	10,065	0.84	10,507	0.86	10,848	0.64	11,072	0.41	11,199	0.23	11,099	-0.18	11,032	-0.12
Curaçao	154	0.77	146	-1.10	142	-0.53	134	-1.10	137	0.31	144	1.06	149	0.69
Cyprus	680	1.51	746	1.87	848	2.61	920	1.65	1,011	1.91	1,103	1.76	1,190	1.52
Czech Republic	10,311	0.04	10,310	0.00	10,324	0.03	10,269	-0.11	10,267	0.00	10,551	0.55	10,645	0.18
Democratic Republic of the Congo	33,348	2.83	39,152	3.26	46,705	3.59	52,446	2.35	60,699	2.97	69,852	2.85	79,376	2.59
Denmark	5,114	-0.04	5,141	0.11	5,233	0.35	5,338	0.40	5,433	0.35	5,516	0.30	5,582	0.24
Djibouti	383	3.18	500	5.49	554	2.07	670	3.89	667	-0.09	741	2.13	829	2.27
Dominica	74	-0.21	71	-0.86	72	0.40	71	-0.17	73	0.37	73	0.19	74	0.22
Dominican Republic	6,379	2.29	7,084	2.12	7,759	1.84	8,469	1.77	9,165	1.59	9,824	1.40	10,479	1.301
Ecuador	9,062	2.73	10,319	2.63	11,266	1.77	12,446	2.01	13,663	1.88	14,791	1.60	15,869	1.42
Egypt	50,053	3.26	54,908	1.87	58,946	1.43	65,159	2.02	72,544	2.17	80,472	2.10	88,488	1.92
El Salvador	4,672	0.44	5,110	1.81	5,480	1.41	5,850	1.32	5,957	0.36	6,053	0.32	6,142	0.29
Equatorial Guinea	326	4.90	372	2.68	427	2.81	492	2.89	568	2.91	651	2.78	741	2.63
Eritrea	2,942	2.75	3,138	1.30	3,566	2.58	4,198	3.32	5,070	3.85	5,793	2.70	6,528	2.42
Estonia	1,539	0.74	1,570	0.40	1,447	-1.62	1,380	-0.94	1,332	-0.71	1,303	-0.44	1,266	-0.58
Eswatini	722	3.37	882	4.09	1,004	2.63	1,144	2.65	1,259	1.94	1,355	1.47	1,436	1.18
Ethiopia	40,684	2.46	47,555	3.17	55,726	3.22	64,366	2.92	74,355	2.93	86,043	2.96	99,466	2.94
Faroe Islands	46	0.96	48	0.81	44	-1.70	46	1.02	49	1.07	50	0.31	51	0.46
Federated States of Micronesia	91	3.29	109	3.68	106	-0.49	108	0.33	109	0.07	108	-0.17	106	-0.36
Fiji	699	1.95	740	1.14	773	0.87	805	0.83	837	0.77	876	0.93	910	0.75
Finland	4,902	0.51	4,987	0.34	5,105	0.47	5,169	0.25	5,239	0.27	5,355	0.44	5,477	0.45
France	56,561	0.50	58,256	0.59	59,824	0.53	61,256	0.47	63,060	0.58	64,941	0.59	66,554	0.49
French Polynesia	176	3.06	200	2.61	217	1.68	236	1.70	254	1.47	269	1.16	283	1.01
Gabon	834	3.14	939	2.40	1,070	2.65	1,237	2.95	1,396	2.45	1,546	2.06	1,706	1.99
Gambia	773	3.44	952	4.25	1,162	4.08	1,357	3.15	1,548	2.67	1,756	2.55	1,968	2.31
Georgia	5,193	0.58	5,432	0.90	5,042	-1.48	4,819	-0.90	4,791	-0.12	4,903	0.47	4,932	0.12
Germany	77,685	-0.16	79,381	0.43	81,654	0.57	82,184	0.13	82,440	0.06	81,645	-0.19	80,855	-0.19
Ghana	13,573	4.01	15,549	2.76	17,322	2.18	18,982	1.85	21,107	2.15	23,572	2.23	26,328	2.24
Gibraltar	29	-0.13	30	0.32	27	-1.66	28	0.38	29	0.86	29	0.29	30	0.26
Greece	9,924	0.58	10,130	0.41	10,458	0.64	10,560	0.19	10,669	0.21	10,750	0.15	10,776	0.05
Greenland	54	1.15	56	0.92	57	0.20	57	0.25	58	0.31	58	-0.05	58	0.03
Grenada	94	0.63	95	0.24	98	0.74	102	0.78	105	0.58	108	0.61	111	0.53
Guam	121	2.45	135	2.15	145	1.46	156	1.50	159	0.39	160	0.13	162	0.29
Guatemala	7,581	2.66	8,966	3.41	10,028	2.26	11,086	2.02	12,183	1.91	13,551	2.15	14,919	1.94
Guernsey	56	0.67	63	2.57	61	-0.53	62	0.32	64	0.38	65	0.51	67	0.40
Guinea	5,227	3.28	6,119	3.20	7,446	4.00	8,351	2.32	9,154	1.85	10,325	2.44	11,781	2.67
Guinea-Bissau	886	2.33	996	2.39	1,144	2.80	1,279	2.27	1,415	2.03	1,566	2.05	1,727	1.98
Guyana	763	0.08	772	0.24	769	-0.07	785	0.41	775	-0.26	746	-0.76	736	-0.29
Haiti	6,120	2.13	6,798	2.12	7,571	2.18	8,413	2.13	9,205	1.82	9,649	0.95	10,111	0.94
Honduras	4,078	3.69	4,795	3.29	5,551	2.97	6,360	2.76	7,194	2.49	7,990	2.12	8,747	1.83
Hong Kong	5,457	1.51	5,688	0.84	6,223	1.81	6,656	1.36	6,905	0.74	7,030	0.36	7,142	0.32
Hungary	10,649	-0.12	10,372	-0.53	10,281	-0.18	10,148	-0.26	10,058	-0.18	9,993	-0.13	9,898	-0.19
Iceland	242	1.13	255	1.08	268	0.99	282	0.99	297	1.09	318	1.39	332	0.87
India	759,613	2.09	838,159	1.99	920,585	1.89	1,006,301	1.80	1,090,974	1.63	1,173,109	1.46	1,251,696	1.31
Indonesia	166,070	2.01	181,600	1.80	197,604	1.70	214,091	1.62	229,245	1.38	243,423	1.21	255,994	1.01
Iran	48,619	4.13	58,101	3.63	64,218	2.02	68,632	1.34	72,283	1.04	76,924	1.25	81,825	1.24
Iraq	15,694	3.47	18,140	2.94	19,658	1.62	23,129	3.30	27,538	3.55	30,527	2.08	37,057	3.95
Ireland	3,541	0.80	3,509	-0.18	3,614	0.60	3,823	1.13	4,200	1.90	4,623	1.94	4,893	1.14
Isle of Man	65	0.10	69	1.34	73	1.01	76	0.92	80	1.01	84	1.05	88	0.86
Israel	4,050	1.71	4,460	1.95	5,335	3.65	6,098	2.71	6,726	1.98	7,369	1.84	8,050	1.78
Italy	56,719	0.09	56,714	0.00	57,295	0.20	57,785	0.17	59,038	0.43	60,749	0.57	61,856	0.36
Ivory Coast	10,332	3.75	12,491	3.87	14,846	3.51	16,885	2.61	18,921	2.30	21,059	2.16	23,296	2.04
Jamaica	2,319	0.79	2,348	0.25	2,470	1.02	2,616	1.16	2,737	0.91	2,848	0.80	2,951	0.71
Japan	120,755	0.67	123,538	0.46	125,328	0.29	126,776	0.23	127,716	0.15	127,580	-0.02	126,920	-0.10
Jersey	80	1.05	84	0.99	85	0.33	88	0.56	89	0.25	94	1.08	98	0.83
Jordan	2,669	4.04	3,321	4.47	4,249	5.05	4,786	2.40	5,363	2.31	6,501	3.92	8,118	4.54
Kazakhstan	15,999	1.30	16,776	0.95	16,390	-0.46	15,688	-0.87	16,123	0.55	17,085	1.17	18,158	1.22
Kenya	19,763	3.89	23,361	3.40	27,164	3.06	30,606	2.42	35,247	2.86	40,844	2.99	45,926	2.37
Kiribati	63	1.52	72	2.82	77	1.43	86	2.15	93	1.70	100	1.45	106	1.22
Kosovo	1,683	2.03	1,862	2.05	2,029	1.73	1,701	-3.47	1,768	0.78	1,816	0.53	1,871	0.61
Kuwait	1,733	4.81	2,132	4.23	1,665	-4.82	1,973	3.45	2,257	2.73	2,544	2.42	2,789	1.86
Kyrgyzstan	4,062	2.27	4,484	2.00	4,621	0.60	4,938	1.34	5,165	0.90	5,411	0.94	5,665	0.92
Laos	3,658	2.12	4,211	2.86	4,847	2.85	5,398	2.18	5,837	1.58	6,369	1.76	6,912	1.65
Latvia	2,607	0.64	2,664	0.43	2,481	-1.41	2,369	-0.92	2,259	-0.94	2,116	-1.31	1,987	-1.25
Lebanon	3,177	1.83	3,452	1.67	3,673	1.25	3,835	0.87	4,139	1.54	4,493	1.65	6,185	6.60
Lesotho	1,552	2.69	1,704	1.88	1,848	1.64	1,917	0.73	1,923	0.06	1,920	-0.03	1,948	0.29
Liberia	2,162	3.08	2,139	-0.22	1,901	-2.34	2,601	6.48	2,931	2.41	3,686	4.69	4,196	2.63
Libya	3,661	3.64	4,099	2.29	4,584	2.26	5,025	1.85	5,571	2.08	6,111	1.87	6,412	0.97
Liechtenstein	27	1.40	29	1.39	31	1.41	33	1.18	35	1.27	37	0.71	38	0.81
Lithuania	3,588	0.87	3,684	0.53	3,510	-0.96	3,490	-0.12	3,327	-0.95	3,089	-1.47	2,885	-1.36
Luxembourg	368	0.15	383	0.85	410	1.35	439	1.37	468	1.29	510	1.73	571	2.29
Macau	306	3.64	352	2.84	402	2.67	432	1.47	475	1.89	568	3.68	593	0.86
Madagascar	10,029	2.90	11,633	3.01	13,533	3.07	15,713	3.03	18,132	2.91	20,847	2.83	23,813	2.70
Malawi	7,321	3.19	9,360	5.04	9,809	0.94	11,130	2.56	12,864	2.94	15,183	3.37	17,965	3.42
Malaysia	15,650	3.06	17,883	2.70	20,340	2.61	23,152	2.62	25,969	2.32	28,275	1.72	30,514	1.54
Maldives	178	3.01	217	4.09	261	3.77	300	2.86	337	2.31	396	3.31	394	-0.12
Mali	7,623	2.11	8,487	2.17	9,489	2.26	10,788	2.60	12,528	3.04	14,583	3.09	16,956	3.06
Malta	348	-0.95	360	0.69	377	0.97	390	0.68	399	0.44	407	0.41	414	0.35
Marshall Islands	39	4.50	46	3.69	50	1.61	54	1.35	60	2.17	66	2.19	73	1.85
Mauritania	1,724	2.21	1,925	2.24	2,235	3.03	2,501	2.28	2,838	2.56	3,206	2.46	3,597	2.33
Mauritius	1,021	1.15	1,062	0.79	1,124	1.13	1,186	1.09	1,243	0.94	1,295	0.81	1,340	0.70
Mexico	76,601	2.31	84,635	2.01	92,584	1.81	99,776	1.51	106,577	1.33	114,062	1.37	121,737	1.31
Moldova	4,149	0.75	4,375	1.07	4,356	-0.09	4,181	-0.82	3,949	-1.14	3,732	-1.12	3,547	-1.01
Monaco	29	1.20	30	1.24	31	0.62	32	0.60	32	-0.48	31	-0.33	31	-0.03
Mongolia	1,860	2.35	2,122	2.67	2,307	1.69	2,461	1.30	2,603	1.13	2,784	1.35	2,993	1.46
Montenegro	561	0.02	584	0.80	671	2.83	733	1.78	700	-0.92	667	-0.95	648	-0.60
Montserrat	12	-0.77	11	-1.07	11	-0.87	4	-17.39	5	2.77	6	2.47	6	0.48
Morocco	21,644	2.12	24,000	2.09	26,148	1.73	28,114	1.46	29,901	1.24	31,628	1.13	33,323	1.05
Mozambique	13,294	1.89	12,990	-0.46	15,889	4.11	17,997	2.52	20,069	2.20	22,418	2.24	25,304	2.45
Myanmar	36,766	1.98	40,464	1.94	43,994	1.69	47,439	1.52	50,573	1.29	53,415	1.10	56,321	1.07
Namibia	1,205	2.62	1,471	4.08	1,682	2.72	1,894	2.40	2,029	1.39	2,129	0.97	2,213	0.78
Nauru	9	2.01	10	2.18	10	0.69	10	0.08	11	0.31	10	-1.54	10	0.58
Nepal	16,570	2.47	18,919	2.69	21,877	2.95	24,819	2.56	27,094	1.77	28,952	1.34	31,552	1.73
Netherlands	14,505	0.49	14,966	0.63	15,477	0.67	15,931	0.58	16,300	0.46	16,574	0.33	16,948	0.45
New Caledonia	153	1.82	169	2.05	192	2.57	212	1.95	233	1.93	253	1.66	272	1.48
New Zealand	3,324	0.95	3,414	0.53	3,643	1.30	3,803	0.86	4,049	1.26	4,253	0.99	4,439	0.86
Nicaragua	3,181	2.56	3,644	2.76	4,402	3.85	4,867	2.03	5,268	1.60	5,605	1.25	5,908	1.06
Niger	6,870	2.43	7,826	2.64	9,111	3.09	10,726	3.32	12,783	3.57	15,271	3.62	18,046	3.40
Nigeria	84,898	2.56	96,685	2.63	109,753	2.57	123,946	2.46	141,190	2.64	160,342	2.58	181,563	2.52
North Korea	18,831	1.60	20,452	1.67	22,108	1.57	22,785	0.61	23,621	0.72	24,326	0.59	24,984	0.53
North Macedonia	1,845	0.58	1,862	0.18	1,955	0.98	2,015	0.61	2,046	0.30	2,073	0.26	2,097	0.23
Northern Mariana Islands	22	4.83	45	15.54	58	5.38	70	4.02	71	0.27	54	-5.40	53	-0.44
Norway	4,153	0.32	4,243	0.43	4,360	0.55	4,493	0.60	4,625	0.58	4,892	1.13	5,208	1.26
Oman	1,498	4.78	1,795	3.69	2,139	3.57	2,433	2.61	2,697	2.09	2,968	1.93	3,287	2.06
Pakistan	102,079	3.68	118,817	3.08	134,186	2.46	152,430	2.58	169,279	2.12	184,405	1.73	199,086	1.54
Palau	14	0.73	16	1.95	18	2.61	20	2.41	21	0.84	21	0.54	22	0.37
Palestine	1,578	3.00	1,899	3.77	2,508	5.72	3,111	4.40	3,599	2.96	4,120	2.74	4,656	2.48
Panama	2,168	2.04	2,394	2.00	2,639	1.97	2,900	1.91	3,156	1.70	3,411	1.57	3,658	1.40
Papua New Guinea	3,229	2.55	3,683	2.67	4,216	2.74	4,813	2.68	5,440	2.48	6,065	2.20	6,673	1.93
Paraguay	3,634	2.76	4,201	2.94	4,826	2.81	5,419	2.34	5,926	1.81	6,376	1.48	6,784	1.25
Peru	19,380	2.30	21,565	2.16	23,864	2.05	25,797	1.57	27,443	1.24	28,948	1.07	30,445	1.01
Philippines	54,589	2.48	61,481	2.41	68,472	2.18	76,452	2.23	84,965	2.13	93,137	1.85	100,999	1.63
Poland	37,226	0.91	38,120	0.48	38,601	0.25	38,655	0.03	38,557	-0.05	38,617	0.03	38,563	-0.03
Portugal	9,898	0.24	9,923	0.05	10,066	0.29	10,336	0.53	10,567	0.44	10,736	0.32	10,826	0.17
Puerto Rico	3,383	1.05	3,537	0.90	3,684	0.81	3,811	0.68	3,822	0.06	3,722	-0.53	3,599	-0.67
Qatar	343	8.37	434	4.83	510	3.30	640	4.65	973	8.73	1,720	12.07	2,195	5.00
Republic of the Congo	1,927	2.83	2,221	2.89	2,570	2.95	2,940	2.73	3,473	3.39	4,238	4.06	4,756	2.33
Romania	22,522	0.35	22,866	0.30	22,688	-0.16	22,448	-0.21	22,198	-0.22	21,960	-0.22	21,667	-0.27
Russia	143,938	0.69	147,973	0.55	148,759	0.11	147,054	-0.23	143,320	-0.51	142,527	-0.11	142,424	-0.01
Rwanda	5,987	3.10	7,000	3.18	5,473	-4.80	8,399	8.94	9,612	2.73	11,056	2.84	12,662	2.75
Saint Barthélemy	4	6.17	6	5.11	7	4.02	8	2.99	8	1.26	8	-0.47	8	-0.46
Saint Helena, Ascension and Tristan da Cunha	8	4.19	7	-3.40	7	0.78	8	0.80	8	0.68	8	0.51	8	0.32
Saint Kitts and Nevis	43	-0.30	42	-0.60	44	0.70	46	1.14	48	0.97	50	0.82	52	0.80
Saint Lucia	132	1.36	138	0.98	147	1.27	154	0.91	158	0.53	161	0.45	164	0.37
Saint Martin	16	15.22	31	14.31	33	1.72	29	-2.80	28	-0.34	31	1.62	32	0.99
Saint Pierre and Miquelon	7	0.56	7	0.52	7	0.26	7	0.02	7	-0.66	6	-0.84	6	-0.98
Saint Vincent and the Grenadines	104	1.14	108	0.67	109	0.26	108	-0.17	107	-0.33	105	-0.35	103	-0.31
Samoa	161	0.21	163	0.26	169	0.73	177	0.85	185	0.92	193	0.80	198	0.59
San Marino	23	1.03	24	0.77	25	1.18	28	1.71	30	1.80	32	1.23	34	0.96
São Tomé and Príncipe	105	2.06	116	2.16	128	1.86	141	2.05	158	2.29	176	2.22	195	1.99
Saudi Arabia	13,331	5.87	16,061	3.80	18,756	3.15	21,312	2.59	23,643	2.10	25,732	1.71	27,753	1.52
Senegal	6,379	2.60	7,348	2.87	8,379	2.66	9,470	2.48	10,805	2.67	12,324	2.67	13,976	2.55
Serbia	7,720	0.35	7,787	0.17	7,692	-0.25	7,605	-0.23	7,503	-0.27	7,345	-0.42	7,177	-0.46
Seychelles	68	0.99	71	1.06	75	1.14	80	1.10	84	1.17	89	1.04	93	0.91
Sierra Leone	3,704	2.12	4,229	2.69	3,882	-1.70	3,810	-0.38	4,709	4.33	5,246	2.19	5,880	2.31
Singapore	2,750	2.64	3,048	2.07	3,567	3.20	4,064	2.64	4,606	2.54	5,141	2.22	5,675	2.00
Sint Maarten	20	9.24	30	8.68	32	1.74	31	-0.73	34	1.81	38	2.38	41	1.54
Slovakia	5,145	0.71	5,263	0.45	5,362	0.37	5,401	0.14	5,408	0.03	5,427	0.07	5,446	0.07
Slovenia	1,915	0.87	1,992	0.79	2,003	0.12	2,011	0.08	2,012	0.01	2,004	-0.08	1,984	-0.20
Solomon Islands	273	3.41	322	3.31	376	3.15	434	2.95	496	2.71	560	2.44	623	2.17
Somalia	6,459	2.20	6,693	0.71	6,401	-0.89	7,501	3.22	8,791	3.22	9,768	2.13	10,617	1.68
South Africa	34,255	3.21	38,504	2.37	42,148	1.82	44,914	1.28	48,105	1.38	51,123	1.22	53,676	0.98
South Korea	40,807	1.37	42,870	0.99	45,106	1.02	46,839	0.76	48,006	0.49	48,637	0.26	49,116	0.20
South Sudan	5,320	2.65	4,960	-1.39	5,193	0.92	6,297	3.93	7,634	3.93	9,585	4.66	12,043	4.67
Spain	38,535	0.55	39,351	0.42	39,765	0.21	40,590	0.41	43,705	1.49	46,506	1.25	48,147	0.70
Sri Lanka	15,848	1.03	16,862	1.25	17,942	1.25	19,042	1.20	20,103	1.09	21,084	0.96	22,054	0.90
Sudan	17,507	3.44	21,130	3.83	24,517	3.02	27,068	2.00	29,884	2.00	32,997	2.00	36,109	1.82
Suriname	395	2.18	417	1.07	428	0.55	465	1.64	504	1.65	546	1.62	580	1.21
Sweden	8,357	0.11	8,601	0.58	8,878	0.64	8,925	0.10	9,083	0.35	9,433	0.76	9,802	0.77
Switzerland	6,568	0.56	6,844	0.83	7,165	0.92	7,278	0.31	7,449	0.47	7,770	0.85	8,122	0.89
Syria	10,479	3.70	12,534	3.65	14,487	2.94	16,515	2.65	18,615	2.42	21,766	3.18	17,065	-4.75
Taiwan	19,338	1.62	20,279	0.95	21,291	0.98	22,185	0.83	22,728	0.48	23,127	0.35	23,416	0.25
Tajikistan	4,569	2.87	5,273	2.91	5,679	1.49	6,230	1.87	6,815	1.81	7,488	1.90	8,192	1.81
Tanzania	21,485	2.87	24,805	2.92	29,065	3.22	33,194	2.69	38,487	3.00	44,289	2.85	51,046	2.88
Thailand	51,759	1.94	56,097	1.62	59,818	1.29	62,902	1.01	65,113	0.69	66,721	0.49	67,977	0.37
Timor-Leste	649	3.09	740	2.66	868	3.24	768	-2.43	985	5.11	1,088	2.02	1,232	2.5
Togo	3,130	3.57	3,721	3.52	4,203	2.47	4,992	3.50	5,715	2.74	6,588	2.88	7,553	2.77
Tonga	95	0.55	97	0.39	98	0.24	101	0.55	104	0.63	106	0.45	107	0.16
Trinidad and Tobago	1,190	1.74	1,256	1.09	1,265	0.14	1,252	-0.20	1,237	-0.24	1,229	-0.13	1,223	-0.10
Tunisia	7,364	2.71	8,208	2.19	8,947	1.74	9,508	1.22	10,013	1.04	10,526	1.00	11,038	0.95
Turkey	50,989	2.51	56,545	2.09	61,296	1.63	65,970	1.48	70,465	1.33	74,687	1.17	79,415	1.24
Turkmenistan	3,241	2.42	3,659	2.46	4,079	2.20	4,386	1.46	4,665	1.24	4,941	1.16	5,232	1.15
Turks and Caicos Islands	10	4.53	12	4.33	15	5.35	20	5.22	28	7.44	44	9.39	51	3.08
Tuvalu	9	1.81	10	2.37	10	1.22	11	0.59	11	0.26	11	0.59	11	0.75
Uganda	13,811	2.82	16,549	3.68	19,641	3.48	22,917	3.13	26,917	3.27	31,508	3.20	37,102	3.32
Ukraine	50,945	0.36	51,623	0.26	51,248	-0.15	49,014	-0.89	47,003	-0.83	45,769	-0.53	44,430	-0.59
United Arab Emirates	1,364	6.39	1,827	6.02	2,458	6.12	3,220	5.54	4,087	4.89	4,976	4.02	5,780	3.04
United Kingdom	56,585	0.10	57,411	0.29	58,187	0.27	59,140	0.33	60,488	0.45	62,349	0.61	64,089	0.55
United States	237,924	0.92	249,623	0.96	266,279	1.30	282,163	1.17	295,517	0.93	309,348	0.92	321,369	0.77
United States Virgin Islands	101	0.22	104	0.63	108	0.73	109	0.15	108	-0.14	107	-0.30	104	-0.51
Uruguay	3,019	0.60	3,086	0.44	3,151	0.42	3,220	0.44	3,265	0.28	3,302	0.22	3,342	0.25
Uzbekistan	18,216	2.64	20,531	2.42	23,068	2.36	25,042	1.66	26,540	1.17	27,866	0.98	29,200	0.94
Vanuatu	135	2.90	154	2.69	173	2.31	192	2.10	218	2.62	246	2.40	273	2.11
Venezuela	16,998	2.85	19,326	2.60	21,550	2.20	23,493	1.74	25,270	1.47	27,224	1.50	29,276	1.46
Vietnam	60,094	2.27	67,259	2.28	73,784	1.87	79,178	1.42	84,425	1.29	89,572	1.19	94,349	1.04
Wallis and Futuna	14	3.78	14	0.72	15	0.79	15	0.91	16	0.58	16	0.33	16	0.35
Western Sahara	180	7.65	218	3.92	264	3.95	337	4.97	416	4.32	492	3.42	571	3.04
Yemen	10,540	2.91	12,417	3.33	14,832	3.62	17,236	3.05	20,003	3.02	23,210	3.02	26,738	2.87
Zambia	6,536	3.36	7,604	3.07	8,691	2.71	9,984	2.81	11,373	2.64	13,042	2.78	15,067	2.93
Zimbabwe	8,561	3.61	10,157	3.48	11,160	1.90	11,821	1.16	11,640	-0.31	11,652	0.02	14,230	4.08
World	4,856,463	1.76	5,288,956	1.72	5,699,203	1.51	6,088,572	1.33	6,473,045	1.23	6,866,333	1.19	7,256,491	1.11

== Estimates between 2020 and 2050 (in thousands) ==
Country (or dependent territory)	2020	%	2025	%	2030	%	2035	%	2040	%	2045	%	2050	%
Afghanistan	36,644	2.39	41,118	2.33	45,665	2.12	50,195	1.91	54,717	1.74	59,256	1.61	63,796	1.49
Albania	3,075	0.30	3,105	0.20	3,103	-0.01	3,063	-0.26	2,994	-0.45	2,913	-0.55	2,825	-0.61
Algeria	42,973	1.68	45,842	1.30	48,149	0.99	50,118	0.80	52,030	0.75	53,894	0.71	55,445	0.57
American Samoa	54	-0.21	54	-0.17	53	-0.32	52	-0.45	51	-0.45	50	-0.29	50	-0.06
Andorra	86	0.01	86	-0.12	85	-0.21	83	-0.30	82	-0.46	79	-0.69	75	-0.93
Angola	22,485	2.76	25,674	2.69	29,155	2.58	32,910	2.45	36,948	2.34	41,280	2.24	45,889	2.14
Anguilla	19	1.96	20	1.77	22	1.58	23	1.41	25	1.24	26	1.09	27	0.96
Antigua and Barbuda	99	1.21	104	1.13	110	0.99	114	0.82	118	0.65	121	0.52	123	0.41
Argentina	45,379	0.88	47,165	0.77	48,796	0.68	50,273	0.60	51,574	0.51	52,663	0.42	53,512	0.32
Armenia	3,022	-0.23	2,962	-0.40	2,884	-0.53	2,796	-0.62	2,699	-0.71	2,590	-0.82	2,469	-0.95
Aruba	120	1.26	127	1.10	133	0.93	138	0.80	143	0.69	147	0.61	151	0.55
Australia	23,939	1.02	25,054	0.91	26,056	0.79	26,932	0.66	27,702	0.57	28,390	0.49	29,013	0.44
Austria	8,860	0.44	8,988	0.29	9,075	0.19	9,121	0.10	9,136	0.03	9,129	-0.01	9,108	-0.05
Azerbaijan	10,206	0.85	10,534	0.63	10,782	0.47	10,974	0.35	11,118	0.26	11,201	0.15	11,210	0.02
Bahamas	338	0.80	350	0.67	359	0.51	365	0.36	369	0.23	372	0.12	372	0.01
Bahrain	1,506	2.25	1,580	0.98	1,639	0.73	1,701	0.74	1,759	0.67	1,806	0.54	1,848	0.45
Bangladesh	169,778	1.12	178,312	1.09	185,605	0.96	191,616	0.81	196,224	0.66	199,442	0.45	201,249	0.17
Barbados	295	0.27	298	0.17	298	0.04	297	-0.09	294	-0.22	289	-0.34	283	-0.44
Belarus	9,478	-0.23	9,326	-0.32	9,145	-0.39	8,957	-0.41	8,768	-0.43	8,567	-0.46	8,340	-0.53
Belgium	11,721	0.69	12,038	0.54	12,268	0.38	12,439	0.28	12,583	0.23	12,695	0.18	12,773	0.12
Belize	380	1.79	412	1.60	441	1.42	470	1.25	496	1.11	521	0.98	544	0.87
Benin	11,957	2.73	13,565	2.56	15,249	2.37	16,971	2.16	18,703	1.96	20,425	1.78	22,119	1.61
Bermuda	72	0.44	73	0.31	74	0.14	74	-0.03	73	-0.19	72	-0.33	70	-0.43
Bhutan	783	1.07	821	0.95	855	0.83	886	0.71	912	0.59	935	0.49	952	0.37
Bolivia	11,640	1.51	12,464	1.38	13,263	1.25	14,025	1.12	14,740	1.00	15,401	0.88	16,004	0.77
Bosnia and Herzegovina	3,836	-0.16	3,788	-0.25	3,717	-0.38	3,619	-0.53	3,498	-0.68	3,362	-0.79	3,217	-0.88
Botswana	2,313	1.16	2,426	0.96	2,520	0.77	2,606	0.67	2,691	0.65	2,780	0.65	2,872	0.65
Brazil	216,016	0.72	223,028	0.61	228,720	0.51	233,068	0.39	236,077	0.27	237,826	0.18	238,390	0.11
British Virgin Islands	38	2.24	42	2.03	46	1.80	49	1.60	53	1.44	57	1.32	60	1.23
Brunei	465	1.57	499	1.43	532	1.28	562	1.11	590	0.96	615	0.85	639	0.76
Bulgaria	6,967	-0.62	6,729	-0.70	6,482	-0.74	6,238	-0.76	6,001	-0.77	5,768	-0.79	5,532	-0.83
Burkina Faso	21,978	3.03	25,385	2.92	29,154	2.81	33,271	2.68	37,715	2.54	42,448	2.39	47,430	2.24
Burundi	12,632	3.29	14,792	3.21	17,246	3.12	20,029	3.04	23,154	2.94	26,615	2.83	30,392	2.69
Cambodia	16,927	1.51	18,038	1.28	19,031	1.08	19,945	0.94	20,810	0.85	21,618	0.77	22,339	0.66
Cameroon	26,970	2.58	30,509	2.50	34,353	2.40	38,465	2.29	42,797	2.16	47,292	2.02	51,913	1.88
Canada	36,388	0.72	37,559	0.64	38,565	0.53	39,396	0.43	40,071	0.34	40,636	0.28	41,136	0.25
Cape Verde	584	1.33	620	1.20	652	1.03	681	0.86	705	0.71	726	0.57	742	0.45
Cayman Islands	62	2.00	68	1.78	74	1.56	79	1.34	83	1.17	88	1.02	92	0.90
Central African Republic	5,991	2.13	6,638	2.07	7,326	1.99	8,046	1.89	8,792	1.79	9,558	1.69	10,339	1.58
Chad	12,756	1.86	13,915	1.75	15,115	1.67	16,362	1.60	17,659	1.54	19,007	1.48	20,474	1.50
Chile	18,187	0.76	18,765	0.63	19,204	0.46	19,499	0.31	19,669	0.17	19,731	0.06	19,689	-0.04
China	1,397,026	0.42	1,410,807	0.61	1,419,019	0.54	1,424,558	0.49	1,428,383	0.44	1,433,211	0.41	1,437,978	0.36
Colombia	49,085	0.99	51,195	0.85	52,965	0.68	54,345	0.52	55,335	0.36	55,956	0.22	56,228	0.10
Comoros	847	1.62	906	1.36	964	1.25	1,022	1.19	1,079	1.08	1,128	0.91	1,170	0.73
Cook Islands	9	-2.71	8	-2.33	7	-1.96	7	-1.64	6	-1.35	6	-1.02	6	-0.65
Costa Rica	5,098	1.15	5,354	0.98	5,572	0.80	5,750	0.63	5,892	0.49	5,998	0.36	6,066	0.23
Croatia	4,428	-0.17	4,375	-0.24	4,301	-0.34	4,210	-0.43	4,104	-0.51	3,989	-0.57	3,865	-0.63
Cuba	10,932	-0.18	10,785	-0.27	10,575	-0.39	10,298	-0.53	9,962	-0.66	9,579	-0.78	9,162	-0.89
Curaçao	152	0.39	154	0.28	155	0.14	155	0.00	154	-0.12	153	-0.20	151	-0.26
Cyprus	1,267	1.27	1,330	0.98	1,375	0.67	1,402	0.39	1,414	0.16	1,410	-0.04	1,393	-0.26
Czech Republic	10,703	0.11	10,697	-0.01	10,628	-0.13	10,529	-0.19	10,433	-0.18	10,332	-0.19	10,210	-0.24
Democratic Republic of the Congo	89,250	2.37	99,163	2.13	108,872	1.89	118,299	1.67	127,440	1.50	136,285	1.35	144,806	1.22
Denmark	5,643	0.22	5,698	0.20	5,731	0.11	5,728	-0.01	5,691	-0.13	5,635	-0.20	5,576	-0.21
Djibouti	922	2.16	1,017	1.98	1,110	1.75	1,195	1.49	1,271	1.24	1,338	1.04	1,396	0.86
Dominica	75	0.17	75	0.04	74	-0.17	73	-0.38	71	-0.56	68	-0.73	65	-0.92
Dominican Republic	11,110	1.18	11,703	1.05	12,240	0.90	12,705	0.75	13,097	0.61	13,425	0.49	13,691	0.39
Ecuador	16,905	1.27	17,868	1.11	18,744	0.96	19,514	0.81	20,165	0.66	20,695	0.52	21,103	0.39
Egypt	99,667	1.76	107,653	1.55	111,058	1.37	118,256	1.26	125,242	1.15	131,823	1.03	137,873	0.90
El Salvador	6,218	0.25	6,289	0.23	6,341	0.16	6,354	0.04	6,324	-0.09	6,263	-0.20	6,182	-0.26
Equatorial Guinea	837	2.45	936	2.27	1,037	2.08	1,139	1.88	1,238	1.69	1,335	1.52	1,429	1.36
Eritrea	7,260	2.15	7,988	1.93	8,710	1.75	9,421	1.58	10,109	1.42	10,765	1.27	11,382	1.12
Estonia	1,229	-0.59	1,183	-0.76	1,132	-0.89	1,080	-0.94	1,029	-0.96	978	-1.02	924	-1.13
Eswatini	1,514	1.06	1,586	0.94	1,651	0.81	1,708	0.68	1,757	0.56	1,798	0.46	1,835	0.40
Ethiopia	114,641	2.88	131,261	2.74	149,123	2.58	168,007	2.41	187,611	2.23	207,685	2.05	228,067	1.89
Faroe Islands	52	0.56	54	0.60	55	0.51	56	0.35	57	0.23	57	0.17	58	0.16
Federated States of Micronesia	103	-0.53	99	-0.69	95	-0.84	91	-0.99	86	-1.13	80	-1.27	75	-1.41
Fiji	936	0.58	957	0.42	973	0.33	986	0.28	999	0.25	1,008	0.19	1,014	0.12
Finland	5,572	0.34	5,631	0.21	5,646	0.05	5,623	-0.08	5,580	-0.15	5,530	-0.18	5,476	-0.19
France	67,849	0.39	68,861	0.30	69,604	0.21	70,051	0.13	70,154	0.03	69,936	-0.06	69,485	-0.13
French Polynesia	296	0.86	306	0.69	314	0.52	320	0.37	324	0.23	325	0.11	325	-0.01
Gabon	1,877	1.93	2,064	1.91	2,267	1.89	2,484	1.85	2,717	1.81	2,965	1.77	3,230	1.73
Gambia	2,174	2.01	2,370	1.74	2,555	1.51	2,731	1.34	2,900	1.21	3,060	1.08	3,211	0.97
Georgia	4,931	0.00	4,930	0.00	4,905	-0.10	4,869	-0.15	4,829	-0.16	4,781	-0.20	4,715	-0.28
Germany	82,983	-0.15	80,025	-0.21	78,022	-0.31	76,590	-0.37	74,984	-0.42	73,277	-0.46	71,542	-0.48
Ghana	29,341	2.19	32,611	2.14	36,120	2.07	39,872	2.00	43,862	1.93	48,058	1.84	52,416	1.75
Gibraltar	30	0.22	30	0.12	30	-0.02	30	-0.14	30	-0.21	29	-0.24	29	-0.30
Greece	10,743	-0.06	10,671	-0.13	10,584	-0.16	10,485	-0.19	10,367	-0.23	10,218	-0.29	10,036	-0.36
Greenland	58	-0.04	58	-0.15	57	-0.32	55	-0.49	54	-0.62	52	-0.72	50	-0.78
Grenada	114	0.43	115	0.29	116	0.14	116	0.02	116	-0.04	115	-0.08	115	-0.13
Guam	169	0.80	177	0.98	185	0.83	191	0.66	196	0.51	199	0.37	202	0.27
Guatemala	16,265	1.74	17,565	1.55	18,798	1.37	19,960	1.21	21,049	1.07	22,062	0.94	22,996	0.83
Guernsey	68	0.29	68	0.20	69	0.09	68	-0.01	68	-0.09	68	-0.15	67	-0.19
Guinea	13,420	2.64	15,241	2.58	17,226	2.48	19,354	2.36	21,609	2.23	23,966	2.09	26,408	1.96
Guinea-Bissau	1,893	1.86	2,062	1.72	2,231	1.59	2,400	1.47	2,568	1.36	2,733	1.25	2,895	1.16
Guyana	751	0.40	782	0.81	813	0.78	840	0.65	859	0.45	871	0.28	879	0.18
Haiti	10,693	1.13	11,253	1.03	11,784	0.93	12,267	0.81	12,690	0.68	13,049	0.56	13,353	0.46
Honduras	9,466	1.59	10,144	1.39	10,786	1.23	11,389	1.10	11,951	0.97	12,469	0.85	12,949	0.76
Hong Kong	7,250	0.30	7,297	0.13	7,276	-0.06	7,185	-0.25	7,033	-0.43	6,841	-0.55	6,624	-0.64
Hungary	9,772	-0.26	9,616	-0.32	9,426	-0.40	9,121	-0.46	8,983	-0.50	8,743	-0.54	8,490	-0.58
Iceland	358	1.12	387	0.91	391	0.69	393	0.50	397	0.40	403	0.31	407	0.22
India	1,326,094	1.16	1,396,047	1.03	1,460,744	0.91	1,519,491	0.79	1,571,716	0.68	1,617,238	0.57	1,656,554	0.48
Indonesia	279,080	1.88	288,429	1.74	296,450	1.60	305,653	1.47	314,085	1.33	321,524	1.24	327,282	0.91
Iran	86,544	1.18	89,145	0.99	92,447	0.84	95,163	0.72	98,385	0.60	99,459	0.48	100,972	0.40
Iraq	42,213	2.64	47,657	2.46	53,387	2.30	59,262	2.11	65,148	1.91	70,924	1.71	76,520	1.53
Ireland	5,177	1.14	5,418	0.92	5,632	0.78	5,833	0.70	6,023	0.64	6,195	0.56	6,334	0.45
Isle of Man	91	0.67	93	0.46	94	0.27	95	0.12	95	0.00	94	-0.11	93	-0.22
Israel	9,178	1.51	9,449	1.45	10,041	1.36	10,588	1.26	11,223	1.17	11,819	1.04	12,365	0.91
Italy	62,403	0.18	62,592	0.06	62,623	0.01	62,531	-0.03	62,139	-0.07	61,957	-0.12	61,416	-0.18
Ivory Coast	25,504	1.83	27,652	1.63	29,724	1.46	31,712	1.30	33,610	1.17	35,412	1.05	37,112	0.94
Jamaica	3,052	0.67	3,152	0.65	3,246	0.59	3,332	0.52	3,411	0.47	3,484	0.43	3,555	0.40
Japan	126,138	-0.21	123,366	-0.35	120,752	-0.43	117,747	-0.50	114,449	-0.57	110,907	-0.63	107,210	-0.68
Jersey	102	0.77	105	0.60	107	0.38	108	0.20	108	0.06	108	0.01	108	0.00
Jordan	7,690	-1.08	8,321	1.59	8,989	1.56	9,638	1.40	10,263	1.27	10,857	1.13	11,412	1.00
Kazakhstan	19,092	1.01	19,810	0.74	20,379	0.57	20,887	0.49	21,401	0.49	21,878	0.44	22,238	0.33
Kenya	49,859	2.26	56,197	2.10	63,553	2.01	70,244	1.87	76,059	1.64	83,608	1.48	89,756	1.33
Kiribati	112	1.13	118	1.05	124	0.94	129	0.81	133	0.66	137	0.55	140	0.47
Kosovo	1,933	0.65	2,000	0.68	2,066	0.65	2,123	0.55	2,169	0.43	2,203	0.31	2,223	0.18
Kuwait	2,994	1.43	3,170	1.15	3,331	1.00	3,482	0.89	3,624	0.80	3,751	0.70	3,864	0.59
Kyrgyzstan	5,965	1.04	6,219	0.84	6,432	0.67	6,624	0.59	6,803	0.54	6,956	0.45	7,064	0.31
Laos	7,448	1.50	7,972	1.37	8,473	1.23	8,933	1.06	9,349	0.91	9,727	0.79	10,069	0.69
Latvia	1,882	-1.09	1,773	-1.18	1,662	-1.29	1,553	-1.34	1,450	-1.38	1,349	-1.43	1,250	-1.51
Lebanon	5,470	-2.43	5,397	-0.27	5,528	0.48	5,624	0.35	5,677	0.19	5,674	-0.01	5,622	-0.19
Lesotho	1,970	0.22	1,971	0.01	1,952	-0.19	1,927	-0.26	1,907	-0.20	1,905	-0.02	1,921	0.16
Liberia	4,728	2.41	5,284	2.25	5,862	2.10	6,452	1.94	7,043	1.77	7,625	1.60	8,193	1.45
Libya	6,943	1.60	7,375	1.21	7,773	1.06	8,138	0.92	8,466	0.79	8,747	0.66	8,971	0.51
Liechtenstein	40	0.79	41	0.69	42	0.56	43	0.41	44	0.26	44	0.16	44	0.10
Lithuania	2,732	-1.08	2,574	-1.18	2,413	-1.29	2,253	-1.36	2,099	-1.41	1,949	-1.48	1,802	-1.56
Luxembourg	629	1.96	681	1.61	725	1.27	764	1.04	800	0.92	833	0.82	865	0.75
Macau	615	0.72	631	0.51	640	0.30	644	0.11	642	-0.07	634	-0.24	621	-0.42
Madagascar	26,956	2.51	30,183	2.29	33,418	2.06	36,615	1.84	39,759	1.66	42,834	1.50	45,808	1.35
Malawi	21,197	3.36	24,958	3.32	29,275	3.24	34,155	3.13	39,573	2.99	45,478	2.82	51,781	2.63
Malaysia	32,653	1.36	34,684	1.21	36,619	1.09	38,448	0.98	40,124	0.86	41,620	0.73	42,929	0.62
Maldives	392	-0.07	389	-0.17	402	0.64	416	0.69	427	0.56	437	0.46	445	0.34
Mali	19,714	2.98	22,534	2.80	25,619	2.60	28,805	2.37	32,027	2.14	35,238	1.93	38,396	1.73
Malta	420	0.25	422	0.10	420	-0.07	416	-0.20	410	-0.29	403	-0.33	396	-0.37
Marshall Islands	78	1.54	84	1.32	89	1.18	93	1.04	98	0.88	101	0.69	104	0.51
Mauritania	4,006	2.18	4,426	2.01	4,851	1.85	5,280	1.71	5,707	1.57	6,128	1.43	6,537	1.30
Mauritius	1,380	0.58	1,413	0.47	1,437	0.34	1,452	0.20	1,457	0.07	1,453	-0.06	1,442	-0.15
Mexico	128,650	1.11	134,829	0.94	140,063	0.76	144,287	0.60	147,495	0.44	149,612	0.29	150,568	0.13
Moldova	3,365	-1.05	3,177	-1.14	2,985	-1.24	2,794	-1.32	2,609	-1.36	2,432	-1.39	2,262	-1.44
Monaco	31	0.26	32	0.49	33	0.42	33	0.10	33	-0.24	32	-0.60	30	-0.92
Mongolia	3,169	1.14	3,302	0.83	3,403	0.61	3,490	0.51	3,570	0.45	3,633	0.35	3,670	0.20
Montenegro	640	-0.24	636	-0.12	629	-0.21	621	-0.28	610	-0.36	596	-0.47	578	-0.59
Montserrat	6	0.50	6	0.57	6	0.56	6	0.34	6	0.07	6	-0.11	6	-0.23
Morocco	37,956	1.96	38,854	1.86	40,520	1.76	42,302	1.66	43,704	1.47	44,957	1.17	46,028	0.64
Mozambique	28,604	2.48	32,307	2.46	36,622	2.54	41,434	2.50	46,746	2.44	52,586	2.38	58,999	2.33
Myanmar	59,126	0.98	61,748	0.87	64,103	0.75	66,155	0.63	67,928	0.53	69,445	0.44	70,674	0.35
Namibia	2,263	0.45	2,284	0.19	2,281	-0.03	2,258	-0.20	2,223	-0.31	2,185	-0.34	2,150	-0.32
Nauru	10	0.51	11	0.45	11	0.51	11	0.65	12	0.78	12	0.84	12	0.85
Nepal	34,209	1.63	36,623	1.37	38,886	1.21	40,940	1.03	42,777	0.88	44,447	0.77	45,985	0.68
Netherlands	17,281	0.39	17,573	0.34	17,797	0.25	17,935	0.15	17,982	0.05	17,960	-0.02	17,907	-0.06
New Caledonia	291	1.32	308	1.17	324	1.02	338	0.87	351	0.73	362	0.61	371	0.50
New Zealand	4,715	0.79	4,776	0.69	4,914	0.57	5,023	0.44	5,106	0.33	5,164	0.23	5,199	0.14
Nicaragua	6,204	0.98	6,494	0.92	6,754	0.79	6,957	0.59	7,101	0.41	7,192	0.25	7,234	0.12
Niger	21,152	3.23	24,619	3.08	28,382	2.89	32,319	2.63	36,318	2.36	40,298	2.10	44,222	1.88
Nigeria	204,950	2.47	241,581	2.42	285,894	2.39	301,935	2.35	322,187	2.21	364,465	2.04	402,224	1.98
North Korea	25,644	0.52	26,243	0.46	26,689	0.34	26,956	0.20	27,074	0.09	27,074	0.00	26,970	-0.08
North Macedonia	2,113	0.16	2,120	0.06	2,114	-0.05	2,097	-0.17	2,069	-0.26	2,034	-0.34	1,991	-0.42
Northern Mariana Islands	58	1.95	62	1.46	66	1.14	70	1.03	73	0.98	76	0.84	78	0.59
Norway	5,468	0.98	5,683	0.77	5,870	0.65	6,026	0.52	6,155	0.43	6,267	0.36	6,365	0.31
Oman	3,635	2.03	3,982	1.84	4,305	1.57	4,601	1.34	4,880	1.18	5,147	1.07	5,402	0.97
Pakistan	233,431	2.04	257,047	1.82	280,266	1.64	303,044	1.48	325,198	1.34	346,445	1.19	366,570	1.1
Palau	22	0.39	23	0.38	23	0.35	23	0.29	23	0.15	24	0.03	23	-0.11
Palestine	5,181	2.16	5,680	1.86	6,153	1.61	6,606	1.43	7,034	1.26	7,426	1.09	7,770	0.91
Panama	3,895	1.26	4,118	1.12	4,323	0.98	4,503	0.82	4,654	0.66	4,773	0.51	4,860	0.36
Papua New Guinea	7,260	1.70	7,824	1.51	8,359	1.33	8,859	1.17	9,318	1.01	9,733	0.88	10,111	0.76
Paraguay	7,192	1.18	7,603	1.12	7,975	0.96	8,280	0.75	8,517	0.57	8,700	0.42	8,841	0.31
Peru	31,915	0.95	33,284	0.84	34,445	0.69	35,376	0.54	36,096	0.41	36,929	0.38	37,834	0.34
Philippines	109,181	1.57	117,446	1.47	125,685	1.37	133,729	1.25	141,428	1.13	148,672	1.00	155,381	0.89
Poland	38,283	-0.15	37,754	-0.28	36,985	-0.41	36,052	-0.51	35,028	-0.57	33,926	-0.64	32,739	-0.71
Portugal	10,843	0.03	10,807	-0.07	10,732	-0.14	10,616	-0.22	10,448	-0.32	10,220	-0.44	9,934	-0.57
Puerto Rico	3,520	-0.44	3,477	-0.25	3,415	-0.36	3,330	-0.50	3,226	-0.63	3,109	-0.74	2,985	-0.81
Qatar	2,445	2.18	2,563	0.95	2,596	0.26	2,575	-0.17	2,550	-0.19	2,548	-0.02	2,559	0.09
Republic of the Congo	5,294	2.17	5,948	2.36	6,674	2.33	7,475	2.29	8,343	2.22	9,259	2.11	10,202	1.96
Romania	21,303	-0.34	20,873	-0.41	20,387	-0.47	19,870	-0.51	19,313	-0.57	18,712	-0.63	18,061	-0.71
Russia	145,723	-0.08	141,120	-0.20	139,525	-0.28	137,232	-0.28	135,676	-0.27	133,880	-0.31	131,773	-0.38
Rwanda	14,328	2.50	16,081	2.34	17,984	2.26	20,081	2.23	22,379	2.19	24,859	2.12	27,507	2.04
Saint Barthélemy	8	-0.32	8	-0.19	8	-0.16	7	-0.25	7	-0.34	7	-0.40	7	-0.41
Saint Helena, Ascension and Tristan da Cunha	8	0.17	8	0.07	8	-0.04	8	-0.17	8	-0.31	8	-0.46	8	-0.58
Saint Kitts and Nevis	54	0.72	56	0.58	57	0.42	58	0.23	58	0.05	58	-0.11	57	-0.25
Saint Lucia	167	0.31	169	0.24	170	0.14	170	0.01	169	-0.13	167	-0.29	163	-0.47
Saint Martin	33	0.50	34	0.30	34	0.24	34	0.23	35	0.20	35	0.15	35	0.10
Saint Pierre and Miquelon	6	-1.12	6	-1.21	5	-1.29	5	-1.37	5	-1.44	4	-1.51	4	-1.49
Saint Vincent and the Grenadines	102	-0.24	101	-0.19	100	-0.19	99	-0.23	97	-0.29	96	-0.34	94	-0.37
Samoa	204	0.60	211	0.64	218	0.67	225	0.65	232	0.60	239	0.56	246	0.57
San Marino	35	0.72	36	0.56	36	0.40	37	0.21	37	0.00	36	-0.21	36	-0.42
São Tomé and Príncipe	212	1.71	228	1.50	244	1.39	260	1.31	277	1.24	294	1.17	310	1.09
Saudi Arabia	29,819	1.45	31,878	1.34	33,826	1.19	35,615	1.04	37,250	0.90	38,782	0.81	40,251	0.75
Senegal	15,737	2.40	17,581	2.24	19,486	2.08	21,430	1.92	23,390	1.77	25,337	1.61	27,245	1.46
Serbia	7,013	-0.46	6,846	-0.48	6,673	-0.51	6,487	-0.56	6,288	-0.62	6,080	-0.67	5,870	-0.70
Seychelles	96	0.76	99	0.59	101	0.41	103	0.24	103	0.07	102	-0.11	101	-0.30
Sierra Leone	6,625	2.42	7,501	2.51	8,501	2.54	9,611	2.48	10,831	2.42	12,161	2.34	13,594	2.25
Singapore	6,210	1.82	6,733	1.63	7,223	1.41	7,661	1.18	8,036	0.96	8,351	0.77	8,610	0.61
Sint Maarten	44	1.41	47	1.21	49	0.94	51	0.68	52	0.47	53	0.31	54	0.20
Slovakia	5,441	-0.02	5,406	-0.13	5,335	-0.26	5,238	-0.37	5,125	-0.44	4,997	-0.51	4,851	-0.59
Slovenia	1,952	-0.33	1,908	-0.45	1,856	-0.55	1,798	-0.63	1,736	-0.70	1,669	-0.79	1,597	-0.87
Solomon Islands	686	1.94	748	1.75	808	1.57	866	1.40	921	1.23	971	1.07	1,016	0.91
Somalia	11,758	2.06	13,275	2.46	15,041	2.53	16,883	2.34	18,769	2.14	20,684	1.96	22,627	1.81
South Africa	56,464	1.02	59,109	0.92	61,496	0.80	63,603	0.68	65,494	0.59	67,163	0.50	68,529	0.40
South Korea	49,362	0.10	49,373	0.00	49,003	-0.15	48,173	-0.34	46,912	-0.53	45,284	-0.70	43,369	-0.86
South Sudan	14,559	3.87	16,616	2.68	18,682	2.37	20,784	2.15	22,866	1.93	24,892	1.71	26,844	1.52
Spain	50,016	0.76	51,416	0.55	52,446	0.40	53,139	0.26	53,451	0.12	53,271	-0.07	52,491	-0.29
Sri Lanka	22,890	0.75	23,564	0.58	24,120	0.47	24,584	0.38	24,935	0.28	25,133	0.16	25,167	0.03
Sudan	41,131	1.76	42,942	1.70	46,338	1.63	49,857	1.47	53,188	1.30	56,279	1.14	59,130	0.99
Suriname	610	1.01	637	0.88	662	0.76	683	0.64	700	0.48	712	0.33	718	0.19
Sweden	10,203	0.80	10,588	0.74	10,914	0.61	11,190	0.50	11,458	0.47	11,734	0.48	12,012	0.47
Switzerland	8,404	0.69	8,666	0.61	8,894	0.52	9,085	0.43	9,248	0.36	9,398	0.32	9,540	0.30
Syria	22,347	5.54	24,538	1.89	26,090	1.23	27,563	1.10	28,938	0.98	30,173	0.84	31,226	0.69
Taiwan	23,604	0.16	23,643	0.03	23,508	-0.11	23,149	-0.31	22,550	-0.52	21,759	-0.71	20,835	-0.86
Tajikistan	8,874	1.61	9,511	1.40	10,104	1.22	10,668	1.09	11,203	0.98	11,697	0.87	12,133	0.73
Tanzania	58,553	2.80	68,905	2.71	76,071	2.60	85,946	2.47	96,400	2.32	107,301	2.17	118,587	2.02
Thailand	68,978	0.29	69,589	0.18	69,751	0.05	69,447	-0.09	68,696	-0.22	67,546	-0.34	66,064	-0.44
Timor-Leste	1,384	2.36	1,540	2.15	1,690	1.88	1,829	1.60	1,958	1.37	2,079	1.20	2,192	1.07
Togo	8,609	2.65	9,742	2.50	10,953	2.37	12,246	2.26	13,622	2.15	15,074	2.05	16,584	1.93
Tonga	107	-0.08	105	-0.27	103	-0.47	99	-0.71	94	-1.03	88	-1.44	79	-1.93
Trinidad and Tobago	1,209	-0.22	1,184	-0.42	1,152	-0.55	1,118	-0.60	1,086	-0.58	1,055	-0.58	1,024	-0.59
Tunisia	11,495	0.81	11,850	0.61	12,087	0.40	12,223	0.22	12,285	0.10	12,277	-0.01	12,181	-0.16
Turkey	82,018	0.65	84,545	0.61	86,671	0.50	88,279	0.37	89,283	0.23	89,626	0.08	89,291	-0.07
Turkmenistan	5,929	1.13	6,011	0.98	6,027	0.77	6,210	0.60	6,364	0.49	6,498	0.42	6,608	0.34
Turks and Caicos Islands	56	2.15	62	1.85	67	1.61	72	1.43	76	1.28	81	1.13	85	0.95
Tuvalu	12	0.86	12	0.83	13	0.68	13	0.54	13	0.47	14	0.44	14	0.42
Uganda	43,518	3.24	50,693	3.10	58,489	2.90	66,782	2.69	75,460	2.47	84,402	2.27	93,477	2.06
Ukraine	43,923	-0.23	42,888	-0.48	41,699	-0.56	40,538	-0.56	39,428	-0.55	38,325	-0.57	37,149	-0.62
United Arab Emirates	6,496	2.36	7,064	1.69	7,484	1.16	7,773	0.76	7,949	0.45	8,025	0.19	8,019	-0.01
United Kingdom	65,762	0.52	67,244	0.45	68,451	0.36	69,394	0.27	70,149	0.22	70,743	0.17	71,154	0.12
United States	334,504	0.80	347,335	0.76	359,403	0.69	370,339	0.60	380,220	0.53	389,395	0.48	398,329	0.45
United States Virgin Islands	101	-0.67	96	-0.86	91	-1.07	86	-1.25	80	-1.37	75	-1.44	69	-1.43
Uruguay	3,388	0.27	3,432	0.26	3,467	0.20	3,486	0.11	3,501	0.09	3,504	0.02	3,496	-0.05
Uzbekistan	30,566	0.92	31,824	0.81	32,855	0.64	33,653	0.48	34,279	0.37	34,768	0.28	35,117	0.20
Vanuatu	299	1.85	324	1.63	348	1.46	372	1.31	394	1.17	415	1.02	433	0.88
Venezuela	31,276	1.33	33,189	1.19	34,958	1.04	36,544	0.89	37,942	0.75	39,174	0.64	40,256	0.55
Vietnam	98,722	0.91	102,459	0.75	105,478	0.58	107,843	0.44	109,602	0.32	110,718	0.20	111,174	0.08
Wallis and Futuna	16	0.31	17	0.21	17	0.08	17	-0.06	16	-0.15	16	-0.19	16	-0.22
Western Sahara	653	2.70	736	2.44	822	2.23	909	2.04	998	1.87	1,086	1.71	1,174	1.57
Yemen	29,885	2.25	32,823	1.89	35,660	1.67	38,437	1.51	41,142	1.37	43,710	1.22	46,081	1.06
Zambia	17,427	2.95	20,105	2.90	23,137	2.85	26,546	2.79	30,339	2.71	34,497	2.60	38,993	2.48
Zimbabwe	15,832	2.16	17,371	1.87	18,820	1.62	20,282	1.51	21,840	1.49	23,492	1.47	25,199	1.41
World	7,643,403	1.04	8,006,581	0.93	8,340,607	0.82	8,646,305	0.72	8,925,950	0.64	9,180,224	0.54	9,408,142	0.49

- United States Census Bureau - International Data Base (IDB), July 2015 edition (retrieved on October 20, 2015). The current version of the International Data Base website gives updated population estimates for the years 1950-2100 for all countries (except the United States: 1950-2060), as well as the World total for the years 1950-2060.

== See also ==
- Population and housing censuses by country
- List of countries and dependencies by population
- List of countries by past and projected GDP (PPP)
- List of states by population in 1 CE
- List of countries by population in 1000
- List of countries by population in 1500
- List of countries by population in 1600
- List of countries by population in 1700
- List of countries by population in 1800
- List of countries by population in 1900
- List of countries by population in 1939
- List of countries by population in 1989
- List of countries by population in 2000
- List of countries by population in 2005
- List of countries by population in 2010
- List of countries by population in 2015
- List of largest empires by share of world population
- World population
- Estimates of historical world population
- Human population projections
