= Demographics of Pakistan =

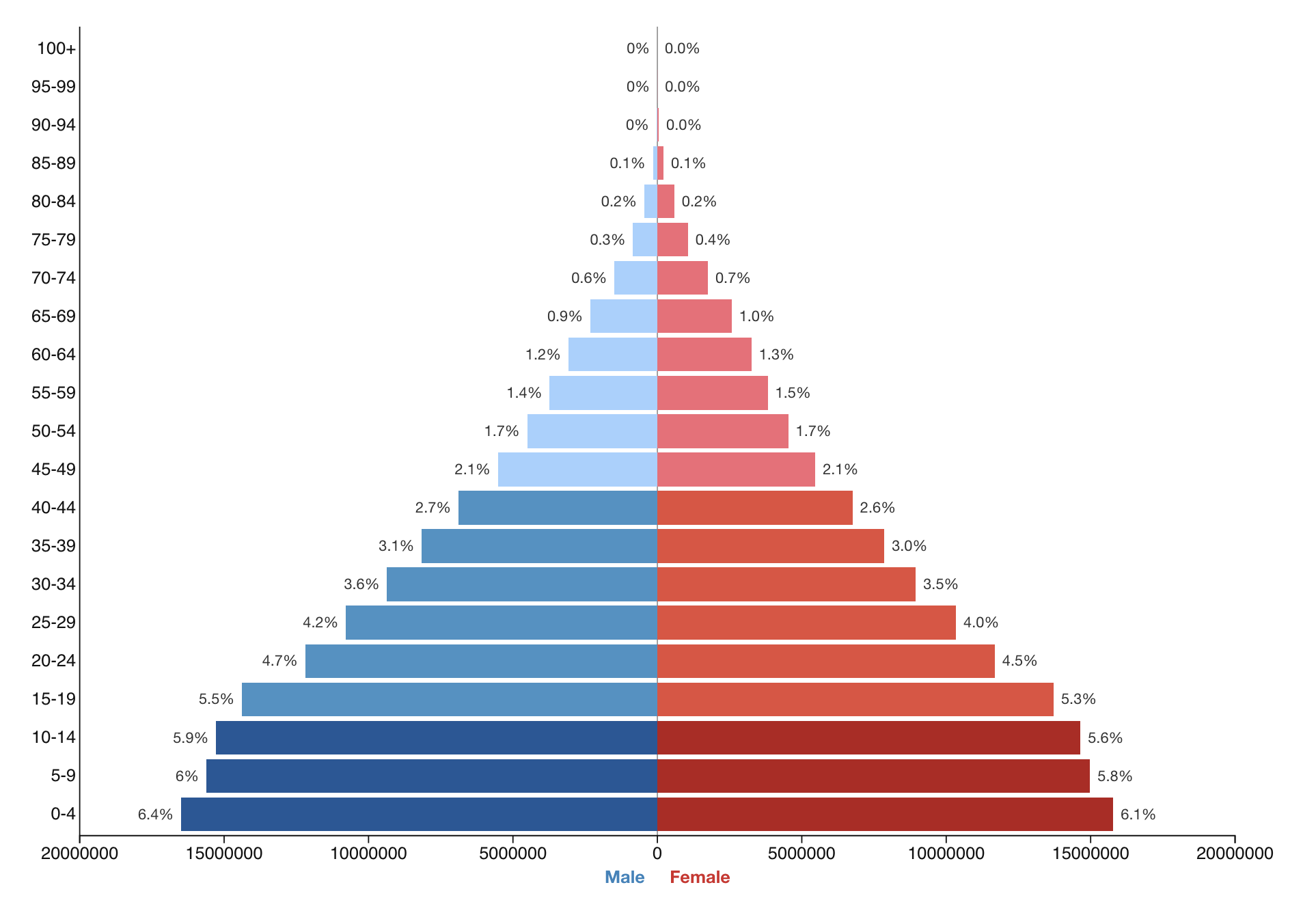
- Population pyramid of Pakistan, as of 2026
- Population: 247,541,947 (2023 census)
- Density: 260.8/km^{2} (675/sq mi); 248.9/km^{2} (645/sq mi) (including AJK and GB)
- Growth rate: ▲1.85% (2021 est.)
- Birth rate: 22.5 births / 1,000 population (2023 est.)
- Death rate: 7.2 deaths / 1,000 population (2021 est.)
- Life expectancy: 69.1 years (2022 est.)
  - male: 66.8 years (2022 est.)
  - female: 71.6 years (2022 est.)
- Fertility rate: 3.50 children born / woman (2025 est.)
- Net migration rate: −2.0 migrants / 1,000 population (2021 est.)
- Immigrant share: 1.7% (2024)

Age structure
- 0–14 years: 37.2% (2020)
- 15–64 years: 58.6% (2020)
- 65 and over: 4.2% (2020)

Nationality
- Nationality: noun: Pakistani
- Major ethnic: See Ethnic groups in Pakistan

Language
- Spoken: See Languages of Pakistan

Pakistan had a population of 247,541,947 according to the final results of the 2023 Pakistani census. The country is characterized by a highly diverse, multi-ethnic, and multilingual society, reflecting its historical position at the crossroads of Central, South, and Western Asia, along ancient trade and invasion routes. Pakistan is the world's fifth–most populous country and has the second-largest Muslim population as of 2023. Between 1951 and 2023, Pakistan's population expanded over sevenfold, going from 33.7 million to 247.5 million. The country has a relatively high, although declining, growth rate supported by high birth rates and low death rates. Between 1998 and 2017, the average annual population growth rate stood at +2.40%.

Dramatic social changes have led to urbanization and the emergence of two megacities: Karachi and Lahore. The country's urban population more than tripled between 1981 and 2017 (from 23.8 million to 75.7 million), as Pakistan's urbanisation rate rose from 28.2% to 36.4%. Even with this, the nation's urbanisation rate remains one of the lowest in the world, and in 2017, over 130 million Pakistanis (making up nearly 65% of the population) lived in rural areas.

Due to a high fertility rate, which was estimated at 3.5 in 2022, Pakistan has one of the world's youngest populations. The 2017 census recorded that 40.3% of the country's population was under the age of 15, while only 3.7% of Pakistanis were aged 65 or more. The median age of the country was 19, while its sex ratio was recorded to be 105 males per 100 females. Pakistan ranked last (148th of 148 countries) on the Global Gender Gap Index, with a gender parity score of 56.7%, reflecting one of the lowest levels of gender equality globally.

The demographic history of Pakistan from the ancient Indus Valley civilization to the modern era includes the arrival and settlement of many cultures and ethnic groups in the modern region of Pakistan from Eurasia and the nearby Middle East. Because of this, Pakistan has a multicultural, multilinguistic, and multiethnic society. Pakistan is also thought to have the world's fourth-largest refugee population, estimated at 1.4 million in mid-2021 by the UNHCR.

== Population ==
Historical Population of Pakistan (four provinces and Islamabad)
Year	Pop.	±% p.a.
1951	33,740,167	—
1961	42,880,378	+2.43%
1972	65,309,340	+3.90%
1981	84,253,644	+2.87%
1998	132,352,279	+2.69%
2017	207,684,626	+2.40%
2023	241,499,431	+2.55%

The 2017 census recorded a population of 207,684,626 living in Pakistan's four provinces and the Islamabad Capital Territory. The census also reported that Azad Kashmir's population stood at 4,045,367 and Gilgit-Baltistan's population was 1,492,924. This meant that the total population of Pakistan in 2017 was 213,222,917.

The statistics in the graphs below were created by the United Nations in July 2022, and are covered in more detail in the following section. This data includes Azad Kashmir and Gilgit-Baltistan. For years, the country with a population exceeding 230 million has been grappling to achieve economic stability. The people of Pakistan are living in a precarious situation, with an uncertain future in the country.

View source data.
View source data.
View source data.
View source data.

Population Density per square kilometre of each Pakistani District as of the 2017 Pakistan Census

Population of each Pakistani District as of the 2017 Pakistan Census

=== Estimates from the United Nations ===
In July 2022, the United Nations published its 2022 World Population Prospects, a bi annually-updated database where key demographic indicators are estimated and projected worldwide down to the country level. They prepared estimates of Pakistan's population for every year from 1950 to 2021, as well as projections for future decades. This data includes Azad Kashmir and Gilgit-Baltistan.

Projections are highlighted in light yellow, and future figures are taken from the medium fertility variant.

Year	Population	% Population aged 0 to 14	% Population aged 15 to 64	% Population aged 65 or more
1950	37,696,264	40.5%	54.0%	5.5%
1955		40.3%	55.3%	4.4%
1960	45,954,226	40.6%	55.6%	3.7%
1965	51,841,626	42.3%	54.4%	3.4%
1970	59,290,872	43.7%	53.0%	3.3%
1975	68,126,999	43.9%	52.8%	3.4%
1980	80,624,057	43.0%	53.5%	3.4%
1985	97,121,552	43.0%	53.5%	3.5%
1990	115,414,069	43.7%	52.8%	3.5%
1995	133,117,476	44.4%	52.1%	3.5%
2000	154,369,924	42.9%	53.6%	3.5%
2005	174,372,098	41.1%	55.4%	3.5%
2010	194,454,498	39.2%	57.0%	3.7%
2015	210,969,298	38.4%	57.7%	3.9%
2020	227,196,741	37.3%	58.6%	4.2%
2025	249,948,885	35.3%	60.2%	4.5%
2030	274,029,836	33.2%	61.9%	4.9%
2035	298,432,780	31.7%	63.1%	5.2%
2040	322,595,767	29.5%	64.8%	5.7%
2045	345,818,945	28.1%	65.8%	6.2%
2050	367,808,468	26.6%	66.5%	6.9%

=== Structure of population ===
Median Age of each Pakistani District as of the 2017 Pakistani Census

The table below shows Pakistan's population structure by five-year age group and sex using data from the 2023 census. The country's population structure is relatively young, with a median age of 19. With low death rates and a declining birth rate, the country is in the third stage of its Demographic transition. In 2017, Pakistan's sex ratio stood at 105 males per 100 females, which is much more balanced than South Asia as a whole.

The statistics below do not contain Azad Kashmir or Gilgit-Baltistan, which disseminate their census data separately from Pakistan's four provinces and Islamabad.

Age group	Male	Female	Total	Sex ratio	Percent
Total	123,824,681	116,613,077	240,458,089	106.12	100.0%
0 – 4	18,744,989	17,726,432	36,471,421	105.1	14.0%
5 – 9	16,566,852	15,705,284	32,272,136	108.8	14.5%
10 – 14	14,971,914	13,817,137	28,790,182	111.8	11.8%
15 – 19	12,581,753	11,569,893	24,154,118	108.0	10.3%
20 – 24	10,323,755	10,141,864	20,468,713	100.0	8.9%
25 – 29	8,946,770	9,016,962	17,967,161	98.8	7.9%
30 – 34	7,730,953	8,026,004	15,759,670	96.4	6.8%
35 – 39	7,313,967	7,047,727	14,364,278	102.2	5.8%
40 – 44	6,471,820	6,063,242	12,536,758	101.5	4.6%
45 – 49	5,095,175	4,624,839	9,721,110	104.9	3.8%
50 – 54	4,219,234	3,827,003	8,047,113	110.4	3.3%
55 – 59	3,455,455	2,933,026	6,388,995	113.8	2.4%
60 – 64	2,247,341	2,063,695	4,311,861	108.9	2.1%
65 – 69	1,557,733	1,393,718	2,952,013	111.8	1.4%
70 – 74	1,131,916	1,001,805	2,134,220	113.0	1.0%
75 or more	1,338,251	1,287,621	2,626,523	103.9	1.26%
Age group	Male	Female	Total	Sex ratio	Percent
0 – 14	43,533,720	40,182,776	83 716 496	108.3	40.3%
15 – 64	58,778,374	57,478,712	116,257,086	102.3	56.0%
65+	4,027,900	3,683,144	7,711,044	109.4	3.7%

=== Population distribution ===
Pakistan's population is distributed unevenly, with over half of the country's people living in the Punjab province. On the other hand, Balochistan, which is geographically Pakistan's largest province, is the least-populated. The population is mainly clustered around the most agriculturally fertile areas (which is the reason Punjab has the highest population as it is agriculturally fertile), particularly the Indus River and its tributaries. Most of the country's people live in rural areas, but two large and growing megacities exist: the coastal Karachi and Lahore in eastern Punjab. Numerous smaller cities (such as Faisalabad, Rawalpindi, Peshawar, Gujranwala and the capital Islamabad) dot the rest of the country.

==== By province ====
The table below shows Pakistan's provinces and territories by their historical population. While every one of Pakistan's administrative units currently has a growing population, the pace of growth is uneven throughout the country due to differing levels of fertility, mortality, as well as domestic and international migration. Populations pertaining to the modern borders of provinces are shown.

Province or Territory	1951	1961	1972	1981	1998	2017	2023
Punjab	20,540,762	25,463,974	37,607,423	47,292,441	73,691,290	109,989,655	127,688,922
Sindh	6,047,748	8,367,065	14,155,909	19,028,666	30,439,893	47,854,510	55,696,147
Khyber Pakhtunkhwa	5,888,550	7,578,186	10,879,781	13,259,875	20,919,976	35,501,964	40,856,097
Balochistan	1,167,167	1,353,484	2,428,678	4,332,376	6,565,885	12,335,129	14,894,402
ICT	—	117,669	237,549	340,286	805,235	2,003,368	2,363,863
Four Provinces and ICT	33,740,167	42,880,378	65,309,340	84,253,644	132,352,279	207,684,626	241,499,431
Azad Kashmir	886,000	1,065,000	1,573,000	1,983,465	2,972,501	4,045,367	4,333,467
Gilgit-Baltistan	—	—	—	—	884,000	1,492,924	1,709,049
Total Pakistan	—	—	—	—	136,208,780	213,222,917	247,541,947

==== Urbanization ====
The following table shows how Pakistan has urbanised. As is true with population growth, urbanisation is an uneven and nonlinear process. With an urbanisation rate of 54% as of 2023, Sindh is the country's most urbanised province, just after Punjab. This is largely fuelled by the growth of Karachi, which economically dominates the province and attracts migrants from the rest of the province. On the other hand, the northwestern province of Khyber Pakhtunkhwa and the territory of Gilgit-Baltistan both share very low urbanisation rates.

Province or Territory	1951	1961	1972	1981	1998	2017	2023
Punjab	17.3%	21.5%	24.4%	27.6%	31.3%	36.9%	40.7%
Sindh	29.2%	37.9%	40.4%	43.3%	48.8%	51.9%	54.0%
Khyber Pakhtunkhwa	8.6%	10.3%	11.1%	12.6%	14.3%	16.5%	15.0%
Balochistan	12.4%	16.9%	16.5%	15.6%	23.9%	27.6%	30.1%
ICT	0.0%	0.0%	32.3%	60.1%	65.7%	50.4%	46.9%
Four Provinces and ICT	17.7%	22.5%	25.4%	28.3%	32.5%	36.4%	38.9%
Azad Kashmir	—	—	—	8.1%	12.5%	17.4%	
Gilgit-Baltistan	—	—	—	—	16.8%	16.5%	

==== Largest cities ====
As urbanisation has progressed and owing to the country's large population, Pakistan today has many very large urban centers which act as hubs for commerce and culture. The nation has two megacities, Karachi and Lahore. With populations of 18.9 million and 13 million respectively (as of 2023), they are among the world's largest metropolises. The country also has eight more cities with more than 1 million residents each: Faisalabad, Rawalpindi, Gujranwala, Multan, Hyderabad, Peshawar, Quetta, and Islamabad. All of them play a significant role in the country, housing nearly 19 million people altogether.

Below a list showing Pakistan's cities with a population over 500,000 as of the 2023 census can be found, which not only shows the current populations of the cities, but also their growth rates and locations. The full list can be found on the main article: List of cities in Pakistan by population.

All city population figures below include adjacent cantonments.

City Name	Province or Territory	2023 Population	Avg. Annual Growth Rate (2017–2023)	2017 Population	Avg. Annual Growth Rate (1998-2017)	1998 Population
Karachi	Sindh	18,868,021	▲4.05%	14,884,402	▲2.48%	9,339,023
Lahore	Punjab	13,004,135	▲2.65%	11,119,985	▲4.06%	5,209,088
Faisalabad	Punjab	3,691,999	▲2.37%	3,210,158	▲2.49%	2,008,861
Rawalpindi	Punjab	3,357,612	▲8.18%	2,097,824	▲2.11%	1,409,768
Gujranwala	Punjab	2,668,047	▲3.55%	2,028,421	▲3.11%	1,132,509
Multan	Punjab	2,215,381	▲2.85%	1,872,641	▲2.38%	1,197,384
Hyderabad	Sindh	1,921,275	▲1.53%	1,733,622	▲2.10%	1,166,894
Peshawar	KPK	1,905,975	▼ −0.55%	1,969,823	▲3.72%	982,816
Quetta	Balochistan	1,565,546	▲7.79%	999,385	▲3.04%	565,137
Islamabad	ICT	1,108,872	▲1.59%	1,009,003	▲3.45%	529,180
Sargodha	Punjab	975,886	▲6.81%	658,208	▲1.92%	458,440
Sialkot	Punjab	911,817	▲5.64%	656,730	▲2.36%	421,502
Bahawalpur	Punjab	903,795	▲2.88%	762,774	▲3.34%	408,395
Jhang	Punjab	606,533	▲6.58%	414,309	▲1.83%	293,366
Sheikhupura	Punjab	591,424	▲3.80%	472,269	▲2.79%	280,263
Gujrat	Punjab	574,240	▲6.65%	390,758	▲2.34%	251,792
Sukkur	Sindh	563,851	▲2.02%	500,401	▲2.12%	335,551
Larkana	Sindh	551,716	▲2.07%	488,006	▲3.15%	270,283
Sahiwal	Punjab	538,344	▲5.59%	388,795		
Okara	Punjab	533,693	▲6.90%	358,146		
Rahim Yar Khan	Punjab	519,261	▲3.57%	420,963	▲3.14%	233,537
Kasur	Punjab	510,875	▲6.11%	358,296		
DG khan	Punjab	494,464	▲3.64%	399,064	▲3.97%	190,542

== Vital statistics ==
As Pakistan lacks a national vital statistics system that publicly disseminates data, all of the following information is made from estimates, which are constantly being revised. The United Nations estimated that in February 2021, only 42% of births in Pakistan were officially registered, making it the world's most populous country where more than half of births remained unregistered. The United Nations was unable to estimate how many deaths were officially registered.

=== Demographic and Health Surveys ===
Surveys taken by the Pakistani government or intergovernmental organisations are seen as the most reliable method of keeping tabs on birth, death, fertility, and infant mortality rates in a country without a reliable vital registration system. The data recorded in these surveys is used by the United Nations in order to estimate historical and future fertility and mortality figures for Pakistan in the World Population Prospects.

Survey	Crude birth rate	Crude death rate	Infant mortality rate	Total fertility rate			Life expectancy	
Survey	Crude birth rate	Crude death rate	Infant mortality rate	Urban	Rural	Total	Male	Female
DHS 2006–07	30.7	—	78	3.30	4.49	4.08	—	—
PSLM 2007–08	—	—	69	3.13	4.41	3.95	—	—
PSLM 2011–12	—	—	63	3.26	4.35	3.95	—	—
DHS 2012–13	—	—	74	3.16	4.20	3.84	—	—
PSLM 2013–14	—	—	65	3.24	4.35	3.95	—	—
DHS 2017–18	29	—	62	2.93	3.94	3.56	—	—
PSLM 2018–19	—	—	60	3.01	4.21	3.75	—	—
PMMS 2019	—	—	—	—	—	—	64.3	66.5
PDS 2020	27	6.7	56	3.07	4.11	3.72	64.5	65.5

==== Regional fertility rates ====
Many of the surveys above also recorded fertility rate data broken down by each of Pakistan's administrative units, while many more surveys have been taken explicitly focusing on a specific province or territory. The fertility rate data recorded in these surveys is displayed in the table below.

Survey	Punjab	Sindh	KPK	Balochistan	ICT	AJK	G-B	Pakistan
DHS 2006–07	3.9	4.3	4.3	4.1	—	—	—	4.08
MICS Punjab 2011	3.6	—	—	—	—	—	—	—
DHS 2012–13	3.8	3.9	3.9	4.2	3.0	—	3.8	3.84
MICS Punjab 2014	3.5	—	—	—	—	—	—	—
MICS Sindh 2014	—	4.0	—	—	—	—	—	—
MICS KPK 2016–17	—	—	4.0	—	—	—	—	—
MICS G-B 2016–17	—	—	—	—	—	—	4.6	—
DHS 2017–18	3.4	3.6	4.1	4.0	3.0	3.5	4.7	3.56
MICS Punjab 2017–18	3.7	—	—	—	—	—	—	—
MICS Sindh 2018–19	—	3.7	—	—	—	—	—	—
MICS KPK 2019	—	—	4.0	—	—	—	—	—
MICS Balochistan 2019-20	—	—	—	4.0	—	—	—	—
MICS AJK 2020–21	—	—	—	—	—	3.4	—	—

The MICS surveys above also provide data on the district level, although they come with a far higher margin of error. This margin of error is lessened for larger districts from where larger sample sizes were utilised. In the chart below, the latest fertility rate data for each Pakistani district with a population of over 2 million as of the 2017 census can be found. Although the table is originally ranked by district population size, clicking the headers will allow the reader to sort the table.

District	Province	Total fertility rate	Margin of error	Year of survey	2017 Population
Lahore	Punjab	3.1	±0.2	2017–18	11,119,985
Faisalabad	Punjab	3.3	±0.2	2017–18	7,882,444
Rawalpindi	Punjab	3.2	±0.2	2017–18	5,402,380
Gujranwala	Punjab	3.4	±0.2	2017–18	5,011,066
Rahim Yar Khan	Punjab	4.6	±0.4	2017–18	4,807,762
Multan	Punjab	3.6	±0.3	2017–18	4,746,166
Peshawar	KPK	4.0	±0.5	2019	4,331,959
Muzaffargarh	Punjab	4.7	±0.3	2017–18	4,328,549
Karachi West	Sindh	2.2	±0.3	2018–19	3,907,065
Sialkot	Punjab	3.5	±0.3	2017–18	3,894,938
Sargodha	Punjab	3.6	±0.3	2017–18	3,696,212
Bahawalpur	Punjab	3.9	±0.4	2017–18	3,669,176
Sheikhupura	Punjab	3.7	±0.3	2017–18	3,460,004
Qasur	Punjab	4.3	±0.3	2017–18	3,454,881
Okara	Punjab	4.3	±0.4	2017–18	3,040,826
Bahawalnagar	Punjab	3.7	±0.3	2017–18	2,975,656
Karachi Central	Sindh	2.2	±0.3	2018–19	2,971,382
Khanewal	Punjab	4.0	±0.4	2017–18	2,920,233
Vehari	Punjab	3.8	±0.3	2017–18	2,902,081
Karachi East	Sindh	3.2	±0.4	2018–19	2,875,315
Dera Ghazi Khan	Punjab	5.4	±0.5	2017–18	2,872,631
Gujrat	Punjab	3.1	±0.2	2017–18	2,756,289
Jhang	Punjab	4.3	±0.4	2017–18	2,742,633
Korangi	Sindh	2.5	±0.3	2018–19	2,577,556
Sahiwal	Punjab	3.6	±0.4	2017–18	2,513,011
Khairpur	Sindh	4.8	±0.8	2018–19	2,405,190
Mardan	KPK	4.0	±0.3	2019	2,373,399
Swat	KPK	4.5	±0.5	2019	2,308,624
Quetta	Balochistan	4.7	±0.3	2019-20	2,269,473
Hyderabad	Sindh	3.0	±0.4	2018–19	2,199,928
Toba Tek Singh	Punjab	3.5	±0.3	2017–18	2,191,495
Sanghar	Sindh	4.2	±0.4	2018–19	2,049,873
Islamabad	ICT	3.0	±0.3	2017–18	2,003,368

=== Estimates from the United Nations ===
In July 2022, the United Nations published its 2022 World Population Prospects, a biennially-updated database where key demographic indicators are estimated and projected worldwide down to the country level. They prepared the following estimates of demographic indicators in Pakistan for every year from 1950 to 2021, as well as projections for future decades. This data includes Azad Kashmir and Gilgit-Baltistan.

Year	Mid-year population	Live births	Deaths	Annual natural increase	CBR	CDR	RNC	Crude migration rate (per 1,000)	IMR	TFR	Life expectancy (Male)	Life expectancy (Female)
1950	37,696,264	1,647,739	1,173,219	474,520	43.7	31.1	12.6		263.4	6.80	36.2	33.4
1951	38,215,785	1,686,378	1,121,858	564,520	44.1	29.4	14.8	−1.0	252.9	6.80	37.5	34.6
1952	38,816,777	1,727,288	1,089,817	637,471	44.5	28.1	16.4	−0.7	243.3	6.80	38.6	35.8
1953	39,488,228	1,768,524	1,063,098	705,426	44.8	26.9	17.9	−0.6	234.1	6.80	39.8	36.9
1954	40,224,090	1,810,574	1,044,277	766,297	45.0	26.0	19.0	−0.4	225.6	6.80	40.7	37.9
1955	41,023,128	1,853,944	1,022,153	831,791	45.2	24.9	20.3	−0.4	217.4	6.80	41.8	39.0
1956	41,884,995	1,900,510	1,008,574	891,936	45.4	24.1	21.3	−0.3	209.6	6.80	42.7	39.8
1957	42,808,511	1,948,801	993,703	955,098	45.5	23.2	22.3	−0.3	202.2	6.80	43.7	40.7
1958	43,794,993	1,999,584	981,704	1,017,880	45.6	22.4	23.2	−0.2	195.2	6.80	44.6	41.6
1959	44,843,639	2,049,555	970,149	1,079,406	45.7	21.6	24.1	−0.2	188.7	6.80	45.5	42.5
1960	45,954,226	2,102,786	961,020	1,141,766	45.7	20.9	24.8	0	182.6	6.80	46.3	43.4
1961	47,060,915	2,157,005	951,411	1,205,594	45.8	20.2	25.6	−1.5	176.7	6.80	47.2	44.2
1962	48,161,841	2,201,790	939,942	1,261,848	45.6	19.5	26.2	−2.8	171.2	6.80	48.0	45.0
1963	49,325,050	2,247,761	922,383	1,325,378	45.5	18.7	26.8	−2.6	166.0	6.80	48.8	46.3
1964	50,552,592	2,293,167	907,551	1,385,616	45.3	17.9	27.4	−2.5	161.2	6.80	49.7	47.4
1965	51,841,626	2,340,733	897,333	1,443,400	45.1	17.3	27.8	−2.3	157.5	6.80	50.3	48.5
1966	53,199,414	2,388,085	869,523	1,518,562	44.8	16.3	28.5	−2.3	153.2	6.80	51.6	50.0
1967	54,629,793	2,438,389	854,112	1,584,277	44.6	15.6	29.0	−2.1	149.9	6.80	52.6	51.2
1968	56,124,743	2,483,692	840,624	1,643,068	44.2	15.0	29.2	−1.8	147.0	6.80	53.5	52.3
1969	57,676,805	2,524,648	831,202	1,693,446	43.7	14.4	29.3	−1.6	144.5	6.80	54.2	53.3
1970	59,290,872	2,584,996	818,806	1,766,190	43.5	13.8	29.8	−1.8	142.1	6.80	55.0	54.6
1971	60,878,781	2,648,206	985,142	1,663,064	43.4	16.2	27.3	−0.5	145.5	6.80	49.0	52.2
1972	62,509,565	2,712,779	838,978	1,873,801	43.3	13.4	29.9	−3.1	137.9	6.81	55.4	55.1
1973	64,285,624	2,785,335	852,459	1,932,876	43.3	13.2	30.0	−1.6	136.0	6.81	55.5	55.5
1974	66,149,169	2,853,960	874,080	1,979,880	43.1	13.2	29.9	−0.9	134.3	6.81	55.4	55.6
1975	68,126,999	2,931,237	882,423	2,048,814	43.0	13.0	30.1	−0.2	132.5	6.81	55.8	56.2
1976	70,230,923	3,015,342	900,018	2,115,324	42.9	12.8	30.1	0.8	131.0	6.81	55.9	56.5
1977	72,451,105	3,116,181	922,294	2,193,887	43.0	12.7	30.3	1.3	129.6	6.80	55.8	56.9
1978	74,789,330	3,223,019	934,553	2,288,466	43.1	12.5	30.6	1.7	128.1	6.78	56.3	57.4
1979	77,407,341	3,337,688	950,235	2,387,453	43.2	12.3	30.9	4.1	126.6	6.76	56.5	58.1
1980	80,624,057	3,487,787	970,044	2,517,743	43.5	12.1	31.4	10.2	125.1	6.73	56.8	58.6
1981	84,270,202	3,700,274	1,001,060	2,699,214	44.2	11.9	32.2	13.0	123.6	6.70	57.1	59.3
1982	87,828,198	3,903,191	1,035,663	2,867,528	44.6	11.8	32.7	9.5	122.1	6.67	57.4	59.8
1983	91,080,372	4,067,866	1,057,064	3,010,802	44.7	11.6	33.1	3.9	120.5	6.64	57.7	60.5
1984	94,003,867	4,188,905	1,075,240	3,113,665	44.5	11.4	33.1	−1.0	118.8	6.62	58.0	61.0
1985	97,121,552	4,291,612	1,100,992	3,190,620	44.2	11.4	32.9	0.3	117.0	6.59	58.5	60.4
1986	100,618,523	4,453,073	1,131,849	3,321,224	44.3	11.3	33.0	3.0	115.2	6.55	58.8	60.3
1987	104,251,093	4,602,418	1,185,062	3,417,356	44.2	11.4	32.8	3.3	113.3	6.52	58.5	59.8
1988	107,967,838	4,749,506	1,208,574	3,540,932	44.0	11.2	32.8	2.9	111.5	6.48	58.5	60.4
1989	111,670,386	4,877,528	1,229,672	3,647,856	43.7	11.0	32.7	1.6	109.6	6.43	58.7	60.7
1990	115,414,069	4,979,805	1,238,482	3,741,323	43.1	10.7	32.4	1.1	107.8	6.36	59.0	61.4
1991	119,203,569	5,070,548	1,256,930	3,813,618	42.5	10.5	32.0	0.8	105.9	6.29	59.4	61.3
1992	122,375,179	5,146,942	1,290,628	3,856,314	41.8	10.5	31.3	−4.7	103.9	6.21	59.6	60.7
1993	125,546,615	5,116,844	1,309,418	3,807,426	40.8	10.4	30.3	−4.4	101.7	6.11	59.6	60.4
1994	129,245,139	5,188,381	1,321,834	3,866,547	40.1	10.2	29.9	−0.4	99.5	6.01	59.7	60.6
1995	133,117,476	5,214,150	1,355,586	3,858,564	39.2	10.2	29.0	1.0	97.2	5.89	59.5	60.4
1996	137,234,810	5,283,367	1,351,457	3,931,910	38.5	9.9	28.7	2.2	94.7	5.77	59.9	61.1
1997	141,330,267	5,323,160	1,363,688	3,959,472	37.7	9.7	28.0	1.8	92.3	5.64	59.9	61.5
1998	145,476,106	5,391,873	1,360,060	4,031,813	37.1	9.4	27.7	1.6	89.9	5.51	60.2	62.1
1999	149,694,462	5,457,820	1,350,165	4,107,655	36.5	9.0	27.5	1.5	87.5	5.39	60.8	62.8
2000	154,369,924	5,503,880	1,349,760	4,154,120	35.8	8.8	27.0	4.2	85.3	5.26	61.2	63.1
2001	159,217,727	5,621,718	1,365,265	4,256,453	35.3	8.6	26.8	4.6	83.3	5.12	61.4	63.6
2002	163,262,807	5,707,878	1,383,913	4,323,965	34.9	8.5	26.4	−1.0	81.5	5.01	61.7	63.7
2003	166,876,680	5,705,869	1,389,323	4,316,546	34.1	8.3	25.8	−3.7	79.8	4.89	61.9	64.0
2004	170,648,620	5,728,041	1,397,637	4,330,404	33.5	8.2	25.3	−2.7	78.4	4.69	61.9	64.4
2005	174,372,098	5,741,665	1,467,794	4,273,871	32.9	8.4	24.5	−2.7	77.9	4.59	61.2	64.0
2006	178,069,984	5,780,328	1,397,071	4,383,257	33.2	7.9	25.3	−3.4	75.7	4.59	62.1	65.7
2007	181,924,521	5,939,254	1,421,100	4,518,154	33.3	7.8	25.4	−3.2	74.5	4.55	61.9	66.1
2008	185,931,955	6,026,112	1,440,035	4,586,077	33.6	7.8	25.8	−2.6	73.1	4.52	61.9	66.5
2009	190,123,222	6,126,953	1,466,094	4,660,859	33.6	7.7	25.9	−2.0	71.8	4.47	62.1	66.5
2010	194,454,498	6,251,649	1,479,575	4,772,074	33.5	7.7	25.8	−1.7	70.5	4.40	62.3	66.9
2011	198,602,738	6,344,791	1,497,860	4,846,931	33.0	7.6	25.5	−3.0	68.8	4.31	62.5	67.1
2012	202,205,861	6,416,601	1,518,663	4,897,938	32.5	7.5	25.0	−6.0	67.1	4.20	62.7	67.2
2013	205,337,562	6,432,644	1,512,911	4,919,733	31.9	7.4	24.5	−8.3	65.5	4.12	63.0	67.6
2014	208,251,628	6,374,716	1,522,217	4,852,499	31.3	7.3	24.0	−9.0	63.8	4.06	63.1	67.7
2015	210,969,298	6,297,466	1,504,820	4,792,646	30.7	7.2	23.5	−9.6	62.1	3.99	63.5	68.2
2016	213,524,840	6,291,208	1,510,500	4,780,708	30.0	7.0	22.9	−10.2	60.4	3.90	63.7	68.3
2017	216,379,655	6,289,965	1,496,276	4,793,689	29.7	6.9	22.8	−8.7	58.8	3.90	64.0	68.8
2018	219,731,479	6,302,081	1,508,129	4,793,952	29.3	6.9	22.5	−6.3	57.1	3.86	64.2	69.0
2019	223,293,280	6,689,991	1,562,917	5,127,074	29.0	6.8	22.2	−5.3	55.5	3.81	64.6	69.1
2020	227,196,741	6,726,852	1,715,724	5,011,128	28.6	7.3	21.3	−3.4	53.9	3.77	63.9	68.8
2021	231,402,117	6,797,293	1,731,352	5,065,941	28.4	7.2	21.2	−1.9	52.3	3.72	63.8	68.6
2022		6,855,375	1,587,284	5,268,091	28.1	6.5	21.6			3.66		
2023		6,882,058	1,600,313	5,281,745	27.8	6.5	21.3			3.61		
2024		6,887,798	1,619,471	5,268,327	27.4	6.4	21.0			3.55		
2025		6,909,545	1,640,577	5,268,968	27.1	6.4	20.6			3.50		

Life expectancy in Pakistan since 1921

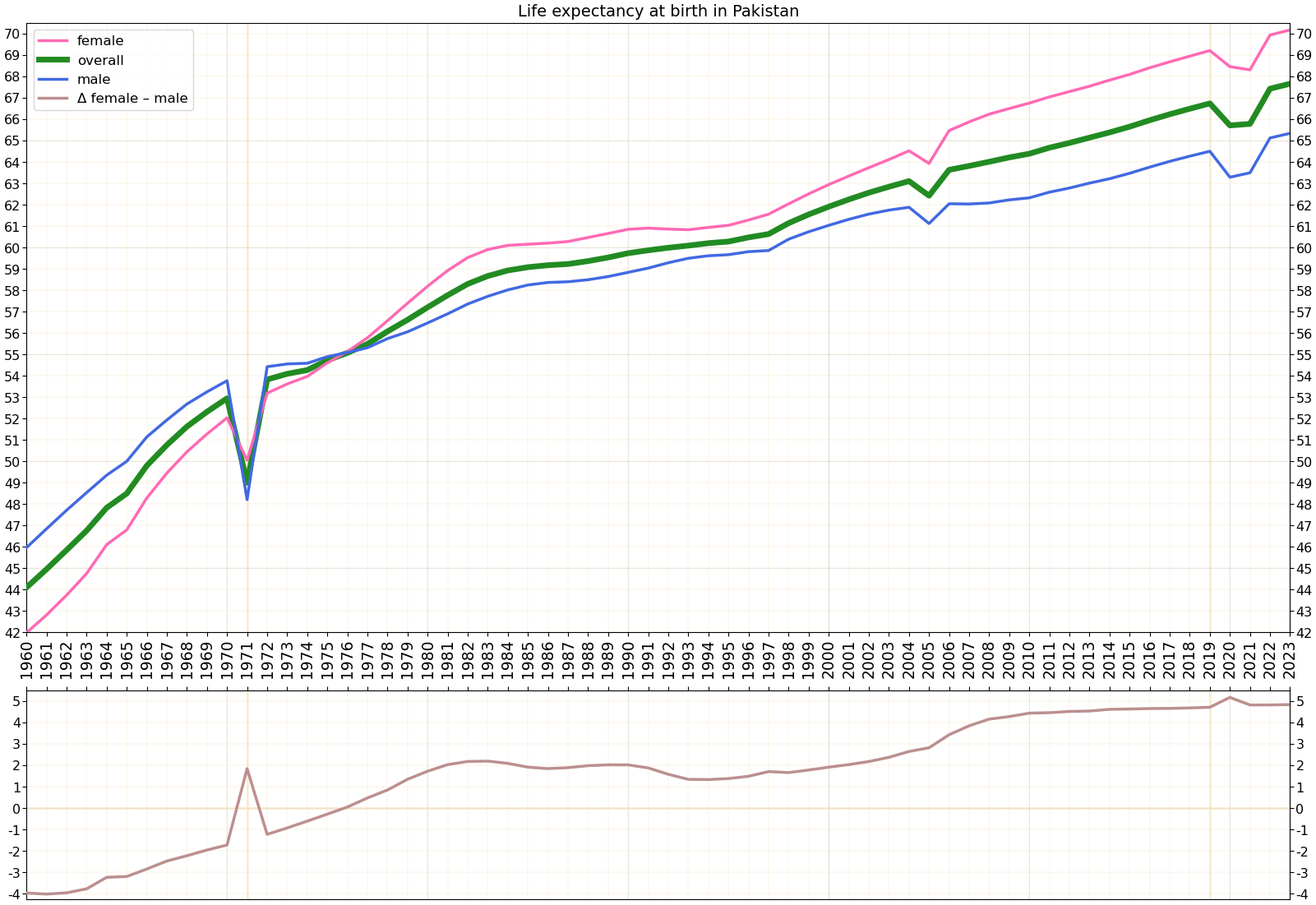
Life expectancy in Pakistan since 1960 by gender

==== TFR before 1950 ====
Years	1925	1926	1927	1928	1929	1930	1931	1932	1933	1934
Total Fertility Rate in Pakistan	6.59	6.59	6.59	6.59	6.59	6.59	6.59	6.59	6.59	6.59

Years	1935	1936	1937	1938	1939	1940	1941	1942	1943	1944
Total Fertility Rate in Pakistan	6.59	6.59	6.59	6.60	6.60	6.60	6.60	6.60	6.60	6.60

Years	1945	1946	1947	1948	1949
Total Fertility Rate in Pakistan	6.60	6.60	6.60	6.60	6.60

== Human development ==
=== Human Development Index ===
Pakistan's Human Development Index (HDI) value for 2018 is in the medium human development category with a score of 0.560 (152nd rank out of 189 countries and territories) compared to 0.614 (135th rank) for Bangladesh and 0.647 (129th rank) for India. From 1990 to 2018, Pakistan's HDI increased 38.6% from 0.404 to 0.560.

2018 Information on Pakistani provinces/regions, compared to other countries, estimated at three decimal places is provided below:

Rank	Region	HDI (2018)
Medium human development
1	Islamabad Capital Territory	0.875 ▼
2	Azad Jammu & Kashmir	0.611 ▼
3	Gilgit-Baltistan	0.593 ▲
4	Punjab	0.567 ▲
–	Pakistan (average)	0.561 ▲
Low human development
5	Sindh	0.533 ▼
6	Khyber Pakhtunkhwa	0.529 ▼
7	Balochistan	0.477 ▲
8	FATA	0.466 ▼

=== Literacy ===
Definition: A person who can read a newspaper and write a simple letter in any language with understanding and can make simple calculation is treated as literate. Literacy rates for the population over 10 years old as of 2023 are below.

Total population	62.85%
Urban	77.09%
Rural	55.56%

=== Educational institutions by kind ===
- Primary schools: 156,592
- Middle schools: 46,218
- High schools: 23,964
- College of Arts and Sciences: 3,213
- Degree colleges: 1,202
- Technical and vocational institutions: 3,125
- Universities: 197

== Nationality, ethnicity, and language ==
=== Ethnic groups ===
Pakistan ethnic composition (2025)
1. Punjabis (44.7%)
2. Pashtuns (15.4%)
3. Sindhis (14.1%)
4. Saraikis (8.40%)
5. Muhajirs (7.60%)
6. Baloch (3.60%)
7. Others (6.30%)

The major ethnolinguistic groups of Pakistan include Punjabis, Pashtuns, Sindhis, Saraikis, Muhajirs, Balochs, Hindkowans/Hazarewals, Meos, and Kohistanis (Note: Ethnolinguistic groups with a population of more than a million each.) with significant numbers of Shina, Baltis, Kashmiris, Paharis, Chitralis, Hazaras, Burusho and other various minorities.

Pakistan's census does not include the 1.7 million Afghans in Pakistan, who have been ordered to leave the country or face deportation. Majority of them were born in Pakistan within the last four decades and are ethnically Pashtuns, Tajiks, Uzbeks and others.

=== Foreign-born population in Pakistan ===
After the independence of Pakistan in 1947, millions of Muslims from India migrated to Pakistan and they are the largest group of foreign-born residents. This group is dwindling because of its age. The second-largest group of foreign-born residents consists of Afghans who have been ordered to leave Pakistan or face deportation. There are also smaller groups of Muslim immigrants from countries such as Burma, Bangladesh, Iraq, Somalia, Iran, Tajikistan, and Uzbekistan, among others.

Year	Population	Foreign born	Percentage foreign born
1960	46,259,000	6,350,296	13.73%
1970	59,565,000	5,105,556	8.57%
1980	79,297,000	5,012,524	6.32%
1990	111,698,000	6,555,782	5.87%
2000	142,648,000	4,242,689	2.97%
2005	157,935,000	3,254,112	2.06%

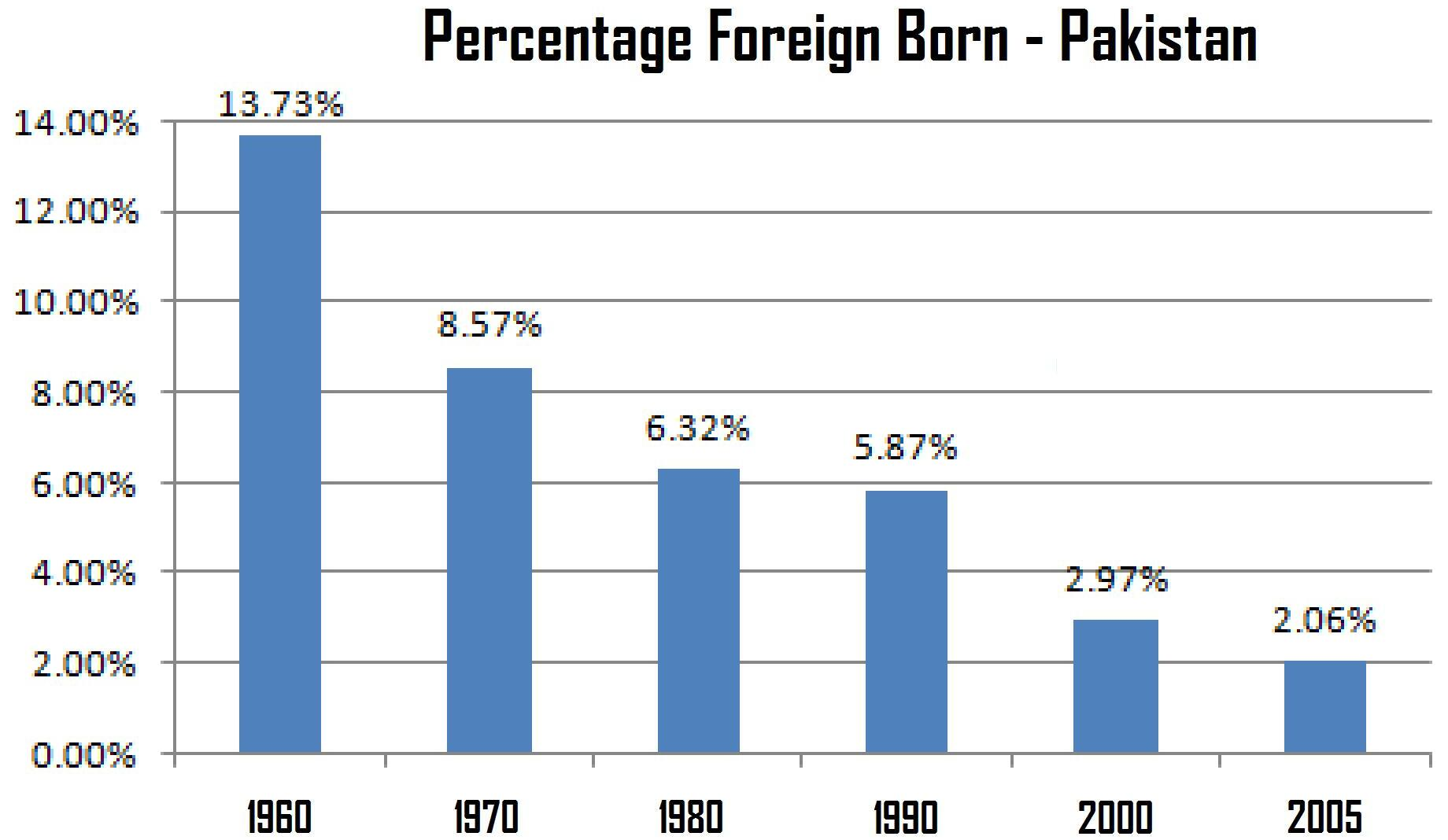

Mostly those born before 1947

https://2009-2017.state.gov/j/drl/rls/irf/2004/35519.htm

=== Languages ===
Languages of Pakistan (2023 census)
1. Punjabi (37.0%)
2. Pashto (18.1%)
3. Sindhi (14.3%)
4. Saraiki (12.0%)
5. Urdu (9.25%)
6. Balochi (3.38%)
7. Hindko (2.32%)
8. Brahui (1.16%)
9. Mewati (0.46%)
10. Kohistani (0.43%)
11. Kashmiri (0.11%)
12. Shina (0.05%)
13. Balti (0.02%)
14. Kalasha (0.00%)
15. Others (1.38%)

Pakistan is a multilingual country with dozens of regional languages spoken as first languages by various ethnolinguistic groups. The majority Pakistan's languages belong to the Indo-Iranian group of the Indo-European language family.

Urdu is the national language and the lingua franca of Pakistan, and while sharing official status with English, it is the preferred and dominant language used for communication between different ethnic groups. Despite Urdu being the country's lingua franca, estimates on how many languages are spoken in the country range from 75 to 85, and in 2023, the country's three largest languages were Punjabi (being spoken by up to 36.98% of the total population), Pashto (18.15%), and Sindhi (14.31%). Languages with more than a million speakers each include Punjabi, Pashto, Sindhi, Saraiki, Urdu, Balochi, Hindko, Brahui, Mewati and Kohistani.

Ethnologue lists 74 languages in Pakistan. Of these, 66 are indigenous and 8 are non-indigenous. In terms of their vitality, 7 are classified as 'institutional', 17 are 'developing', 37 are 'vigorous', 10 are 'in trouble', and 3 are 'dying'.

== Religion ==
Religion in Pakistan (2023 census)
1. Islam (96.3%)
2. Hinduism (2.17%)
3. Christianity (1.37%)
4. Others (0.11%)

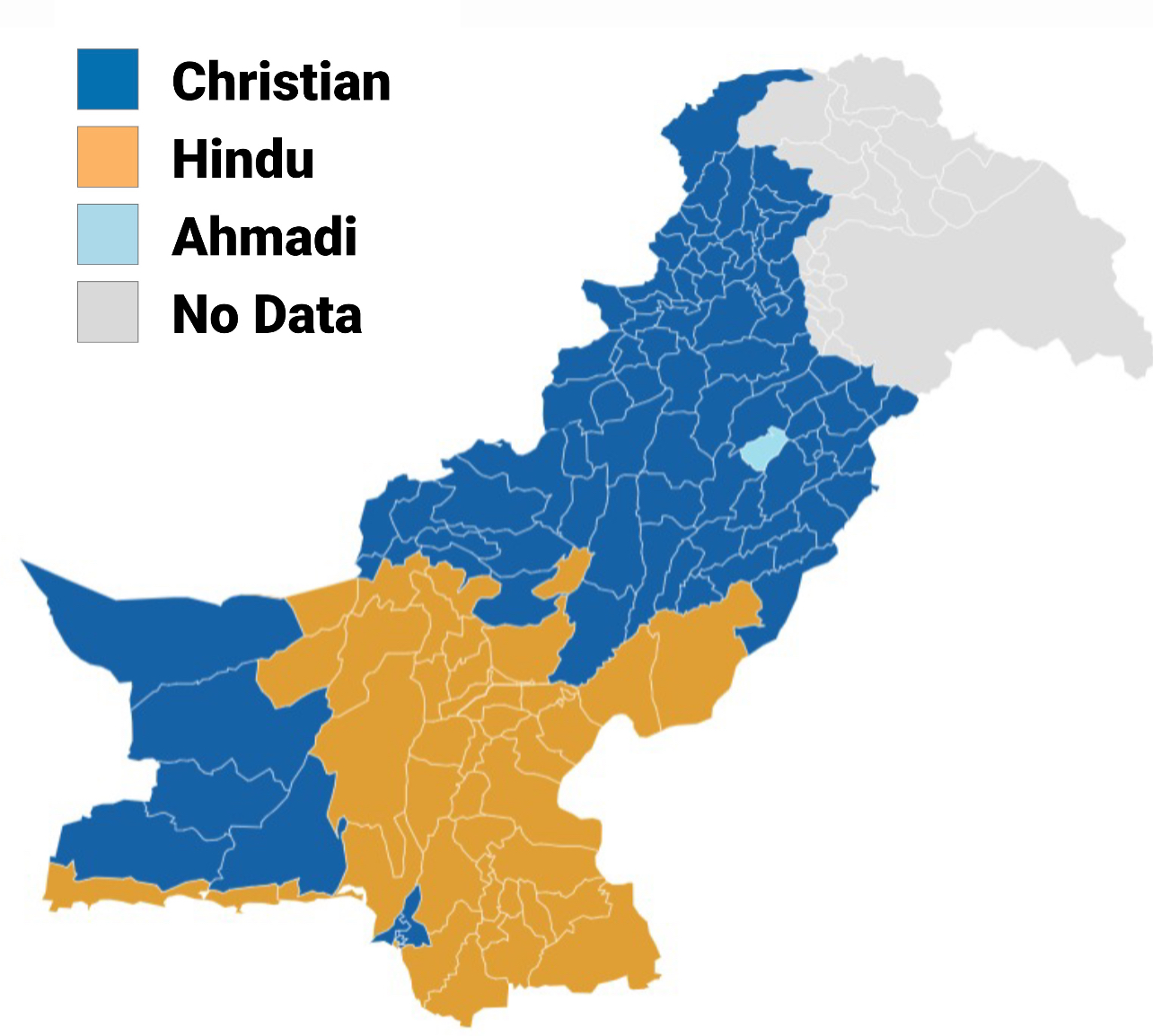
Largest Enumerated Non-Muslim Religious Community in Pakistan as of the 2023 Census

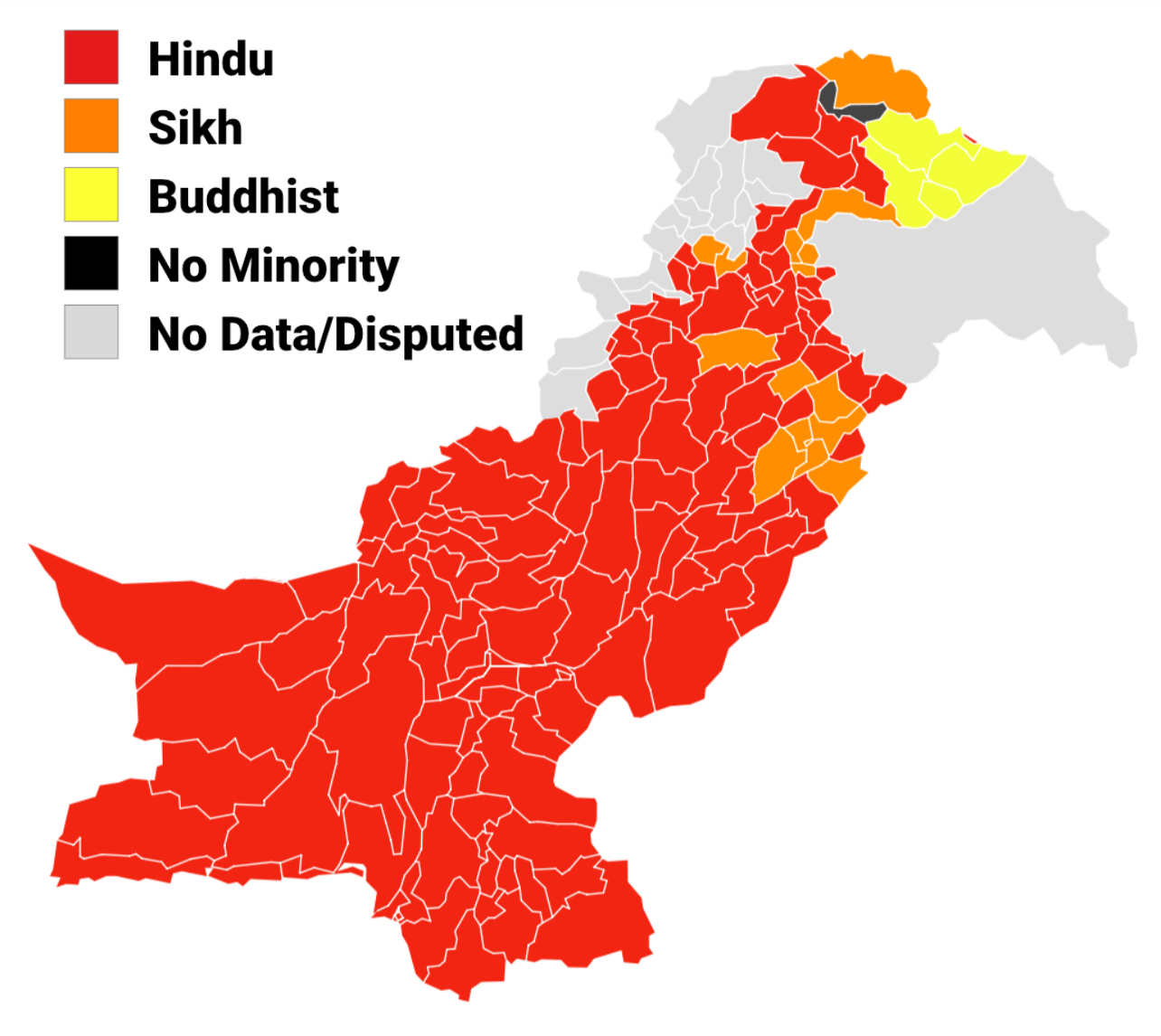
Largest Religious Community other than Muslim in Modern Day Pakistan as of the 1941 Census

According to the World Factbook, Library of Congress, Oxford University, over 96% of the population of Pakistan is Muslim and the remaining 4% is Hindu, Christian, and others. Majority of the Muslims practice Sunni with a significant minority of Shi'as.

Nearly all Pakistani Sunni Muslims belong to the Hanafi school, although there are some Hanbalis and Ahl-e-Hadees. The majority of Shia Muslims belong to the Ithnā'Ashariyyah branch, while a smaller number practice Ismailism. There are small non-Muslim religious groups, including Christians, Ahmadis, Hindus, Buddhists, Sikhs, Baháʼís and Zoroastrians (Parsis),

Religious groups in Pakistan (2023)
Religious group	Pakistan		Punjab		Sindh		Khyber Pakhtunkhwa		Balochistan		ICT		AJK		Gilgit- Baltistan	
Religious group	Total Population	Percentage	Pop.	%	Pop.	%	Pop.	%	Pop.	%	Pop.	%	Pop.	%	Pop.	%
Islam	231,686,709	96.35%	124,462,897	97.75%	50,126,428	90.09%	40,486,153	99.62%	14,429,568	99.09%	2,181,663	95.55%	—N/a	—N/a	—N/a	—N/a
Hinduism	5,217,216	2.17%	249,716	0.2%	4,901,407	8.81%	6,102	0.02%	59,107	0.41%	884	0.04%	—N/a	—N/a	—N/a	—N/a
Christianity	3,300,788	1.37%	2,458,924	1.93%	546,968	0.98%	134,884	0.33%	62,731	0.43%	97,281	4.26%	—N/a	—N/a	—N/a	—N/a
Ahmadiyya	162,684	0.07%	140,512	0.11%	18,266	0.03%	951	0%	557	0%	2,398	0.11%	—N/a	—N/a	—N/a	—N/a
Sikhism	15,998	0.01%	5,649	0%	5,182	0.01%	4,050	0.01%	1,057	0.01%	60	0%	—N/a	—N/a	—N/a	—N/a
Zoroastrianism	2,348	0.001%	358	0%	1,763	0%	36	0%	181	0%	10	0%	—N/a	—N/a	—N/a	—N/a
Others (inc. Kalashas, Baháʼís, Buddhists, Jews)	72,346	0.03%	15,249	0.01%	38,395	0.07%	8,944	0.02%	8,810	0.06%	948	0.04%	—N/a	—N/a	—N/a	—N/a
Total responses	240,458,089	99.57%	127,333,305	99.72%	55,638,409	99.9%	40,641,120	99.47%	14,562,011	97.77%	2,283,244	96.59%	—N/a	—N/a	—N/a	—N/a
Total population	241,499,431	100%	127,688,922	100%	55,696,147	100%	40,856,097	100%	14,894,402	100%	2,363,863	100%	—N/a	—N/a	—N/a	—N/a

=== Recent changes and detailed demographic data ===
Pakistan Bureau of Statistics released religious data of Pakistan Census 2017 on 19 May 2021. 96.47% are Muslims, followed by 2.174% Hindus, 1.27% Christians, 0.09% Ahmadis and 0.02% others.

The 2017 census showed marginal increase in the share of Hindus.The census also recorded Pakistan's first Hindu-majority district, called Umerkot District.

On the other hand, Christianity in Pakistan, while increasing in raw numbers, has fallen significantly in percentage terms since the last census. Christians are concentrated in the most developed parts of Pakistan, Lahore District (over 5% Christian), Islamabad Capital Territory (over 4% Christian), and Northern Punjab.

The Ahmadiyya movement shrunk in size (both raw numbers and percentage) between 1998 and 2017, while remaining concentrated in Lalian Tehsil, Chiniot District, where approximately 13% of the population is Ahmadiyya.

Here are some maps of Pakistan's religious minority groups as of the 2017 census by district:

Hindu Proportion of each Pakistani District of each Pakistani District as of the 2017 Pakistani Census

Ahmadiyya Proportion of each Pakistani District of each Pakistani District as of the 2017 Pakistani Census

Christian Proportion of each Pakistani District of each Pakistani District as of the 2017 Pakistani Census

Virtually all people not belonging to one of these minority groups were Sunni or Shia Muslim, with the most religiously homogeneous areas found in Khyber Pakhtunkhwa.

== Pakistanis around the world ==
Saudi Arabia	4,000,000
United Arab Emirates	1,600,000
United Kingdom	1,200,000
United States	687,942
Canada	215,000
Kuwait	190,000
South Africa	180,000
Oman	385,000
Australia	61,913
Germany	179,668
Qatar	52,500
France	50,000
Norway	39,257
Denmark	21,000
New Zealand	10,000
Ireland	9,501
Japan	22,118

== See also ==
- Family planning in Pakistan
- Minorities in Pakistan
- Ethnic groups of Pakistan
- Languages of Pakistan
- List of districts of Pakistan by literacy rate
- List of districts of Pakistan by types of households
- Demographics
  - Demographics of Punjab, Pakistan
  - Demographics of Sindh
  - Demographics of Balochistan, Pakistan
  - Demographics of Khyber Pakhtunkhwa
  - Demographics of Azad Kashmir
  - Demographics of Gilgit-Baltistan
