= Demographic history of Pakistan =

This article presents the demographic history of Pakistan mainly through the census results. See Demographics of Pakistan for a more detailed overview of the country's present-day demographics.

== Indus Valley Civilization ==
At its peak, the Indus Valley civilization, that covered mainly modern Pakistan as well as parts of Afghanistan and India, was mostly fertile land that may have had a population of over five million. The Indus cities are noted for their urban planning, baked brick houses, elaborate drainage systems, water supply systems, and clusters of large non-residential buildings.

== Independence and transfer of population ==
After Partition of India in 1947, two-thirds of the Muslims resided in Pakistan (both east and West Pakistan) but a third resided in India. According to 1951 census, Dominion of Pakistan (both East and West Pakistan) had a population of 75 million population, in which West Pakistan had a population of 33.7 million and East Pakistan (now Bangladesh) had a population of 42 million. This exchange of population had different impact within Pakistan itself. The migration of Hindus and Sikh from Khyber Pakhtunkhwa and Punjab to India and the settlement of Muslim Punjabis from India in Punjab created homogeneity in Khyber Pakhtunkhwa and Punjab. Balochistan remained unaffected but exchange of population shook the demographic balance in Sindh. Approximately 0.77 million Sindhi Hindus left for India and 1.2 million mainly Urdu speaking North Indian Muslims settled mainly in urban Sindh. In 1954, Urdu speakers constituted 20% of the population of Sindh. Unlike the migrants settling in Punjab who spoke the same language and shared the same lifestyles the North Indian Muslims settling in Sindh were socially, linguistically, culturally, politically and economically different from Sindhis.

== Post Independence ==
The Intercensal growth rates between 1951 and 1981 indicated a rise in the population growth rate in the 1960s and 1970s largely attributed to the sharp declines in mortality seen in the 1950s and 1960s, which were not followed by any decline in fertility in those decades. Intercensal growth rates actually peaked in the 1961-72 period and continued at fairly high levels in 1972-81 after which they began to decline. The 1981-98 period records a decline to 2.6 indicating that growth rates in the last few years of the 17 years intercensal period are likely to have been lower. Pakistan’s fertility decline is a consequence of the rising age at marriage (for women, this increased from 16 to 23 between 1961 and 2007) and the “widespread recourse” to abortions.

=== Yearly population ===
Pakistan's yearly population from 1950 to 2014.

Year	Population	Absolute increase	Percentage increase
1950	40,381,000		
1951	41,347,000	965,000	2.39
1952	42,342,000	995,000	2.41
1953	45,372,000	2,030,000	2.43
1954	44,434,000	-1,062,000	-4.45
1955	45,536,000	1,102,000	2.48
1956	46,680,000	1,144,000	2.51
1957	47,869,000	1,189,000	2.55
1958	49,104,000	1,235,000	2.58
1959	50,387,000	1,283,000	2.61
1960	51,719,000	1,332,000	2.64
1961	53,101,000	1,382,000	2.67
1962	54,524,000	1,423,000	2.68
1963	55,988,000	1,464,000	2.69
1964	57,495,000	1,507,000	2.69
1965	59,046,000	1,551,000	2.70
1966	60,642,000	1,596,000	2.70
1967	62,282,000	1,640,000	2.70
1968	63,970,000	1,688,000	2.71
1969	65,706,000	1,736,000	2.71
1970	67,491,000	1,785,000	2.72
1971	69,326,000	1,835,000	2.72
1972	71,121,000	1,795,000	2.59
1973	72,912,000	1,791,000	2.52
1974	74,712,000	1,800,000	2.47
1975	76,456,000	1,744,000	2.33
1976	78,153,000	1,697,000	2.22
1977	80,051,000	1,898,000	2.43
1978	82,374,000	2,323,000	2.90
1979	85,219,000	2,845,000	3.45
1980	88,097,000	2,878,000	3.38
1981	90,975,000	2,878,000	3.27
1982	94,096,000	3,121,000	3.43
1983	96,881,000	2,785,000	2.96
1984	99,354,000	2,473,000	2.55
1985	102,079,000	2,725,000	2.74
1986	105,240,000	3,161,000	3.10
1987	108,584,000	3,344,000	3.18
1988	112,021,000	3,437,000	3.17
1989	115,419,000	3,398,000	3.03
1990	118,816,000	3,397,000	2.94
1991	122,248,000	3,432,000	2.89
1992	124,962,000	2,714,000	2.22
1993	127,563,000	2,601,000	2.08
1994	130,746,000	3,183,000	2.50
1995	134,185,000	3,439,000	2.63
1996	137,911,000	3,726,000	2.78
1997	141,445,000	3,534,000	2.56
1998	144,885,000	3,440,000	2.43
1999	148,379,000	3,494,000	2.41
2000	152,429,000	4,050,000	2.73
2001	156,795,000	4,366,000	2.86
2002	160,269,000	3,474,000	2.22
2003	163,166,000	2,897,000	1.81
2004	166,224,000	3,058,000	1.87
2005	169,279,000	3,055,000	1.84
2006	172,382,000	3,103,000	1.83
2007	175,495,000	3,113,000	1.81
2008	178,479,000	2,984,000	1.70
2009	181,457,000	2,978,000	1.67
2010	184,405,000	2,948,000	1.62
2011	187,343,000	2,938,000	1.59
2012	190,284,285	2,941,285	1.57
2013	193,271,748	2,987,463	1.55
2014	196,228,805	2,957,057	1.53

== See also ==
- Census in Pakistan
- 1998 Pakistan Census
