= 2023 Pakistani census =

7th national census of Pakistan

2023 Census of Pakistan
- 1 March – 30 May 2023

General information
- Country: Pakistan
- Topics: Census topics: People and population; Families and living arrangements; Nationality; Language; Religion; Education; Economic Characteristics; Housing
- Authority: Pakistan Bureau of Statistics
- Website: census23.pbos.gov.pk

Results
- Total population: 247,541,947 (▲13.3%)
- Most populous province: Punjab (127,688,922)
- Least populous province: Gilgit-Baltistan (1,709,049)
- Literacy rate: 60.7% (▲1.8%)

The 2023 Census of Pakistan was the seventh national census and detailed enumeration of the Pakistani population. It was conducted by the Pakistan Bureau of Statistics. It was also the first ever digital census to be held in Pakistan, and the first in South Asia. It is the most recent census in Pakistan.

The census was initially held from 1 March 2023 to 1 April 2023. However, enumeration was later extended several times until 30 May 2023, because of incomplete enumeration in large cities such as Karachi, Lahore and Faisalabad, where people are more mobile and therefore harder to count, and in remote and rural Balochistan. The extension was also used by PBS officials and census takers for quality reviews, to check if all households and people were properly counted in each area. The 2023 census recorded a total population throughout the country of 247,541,947.

== Background ==
The Constitution of Pakistan requires that a population census be held every ten years. The results of censuses in Pakistan are used for resource allocation, sampling frames, constituency delimitation, apportionment and for policy planning in the future.

After the independence of Pakistan in 1947, censuses were held in the years 1951, 1961, 1972 (delayed one year due to the war in 1971) and 1981. However, the next censuses following were delayed until 1998 and 2017 due to politicization and instability. The 2017 census was the last census completed in the country, which recorded a total population of 213.2 million. (Note: The population of the four provinces and Islamabad Capital Territory being 207,684,626, the population of Azad Jammu & Kashmir being 4,045,367, and the population of Gilgit-Baltistan being 1,492,924.)

Most international organizations and demographers were projecting Pakistan's largest city, Karachi, to have a population between 17 million and 25 million prior to the census, but the results of the census showed Karachi's population at 14.9 million. Because of this, the results of the 2017 Census were controversial and were immediately contested by the Government of Sindh and many major Sindhi political parties, namely the Pakistan People's Party, Jamaat-e-Islami Pakistan, the Muttahida Qaumi Movement, and the Pak Sarzameen Party, all of which refused to accept the final results and requested a recount. They cited studies conducted by intergovernmental organizations such as UNICEF, national identity card statistics, and voter rolls to support their claim, as well as taking note of the issue that no post-enumeration survey was held after the 2017 census. The Chief Minister of Sindh Murad Ali Shah claimed that the population of Sindh stood at 61 million (compared to the enumerated count of 48 million).

Due to Sindhi opposition to the 2017 census results, the publication of the final results was held back for years by the Council of Common Interests (CCI), where Sindh repeatedly expressed its objections. Finally, in April 2021, the CCI pushed through and approved the final results of the 2017 census under the condition that Pakistan would hold another census before the ten-year deadline, and the results of that census would be used for the delineation of constituencies in the 2023 general election.

By February 2022, a timetable for the conduction of the census had been prepared based around the enumeration occurring in August 2022, but in early April, the Pakistan Bureau of Statistics faced a major roadblock, as a delay occurred in the procurement of equipment for the exercise. This delayed the census date by several months from the original plan, as the pilot census and training could not occur in a timely manner.

While originally, the plan was shifted for the census to occur from 15 October to 15 November, another delay occurred, pushing the census to the last week of December, while the results of the census would be submitted to the Election Commission of Pakistan by March 2023. Then, in early November a further postponement of three months occurred, as fieldwork was set to begin 1 February 2023 and to end 4 March 2023. This delay was largely attributable to the devastating floods that had ravaged the country that year.

The pilot phase of the census successfully began on 20 July 2022 throughout 429 census blocks of 83 tehsils across the entire country. The National Database and Registration Authority (NADRA) deployed its technology to ensure accuracy, accountability and transparency and inaugurated the software that would later be used for the census. The pilot census completed on 3 August, and NADRA was directed to prepare a detailed summary to present to the Federal Minister of Planning and Development.

According To OpenData Pakistan Report: Pakistan has 6,445 cities, towns, villages and administrative units divided among 1,972 postal codes. This is the most accurate and complete dataset of the country.

== Design ==
The Planning and Development Minister of Pakistan Asad Umar stated that the military would take charge of security but would not partake in data collection. Pakistanis would be counted on the basis of where they lived in the last six months, on an "as is, where is basis". The exercise was also Pakistan's first digital census, with Umar stating that "98 percent of the process" was to be conducted digitally, and geo-fencing and GIS mapping to be used to monitor the operation.

The 2023 Census of Pakistan involved two questionnaires: a housing questionnaire and an individual questionnaire. Each question in both forms was deliberated on and improved by a twelve-member Questionnaire committee, headed by Demographer Dr. G.M. Arif. On 15 July 2021, the committee held a meeting where they finalized both questionnaires unanimously after a comprehensive study.

On the individual form, the religion question saw an expansion. The number of religious identifications Pakistanis could go by in the 2017 census was six (Muslim, Christian, Hindu, Ahmadiyya, Scheduled Castes and Other), but this has increased to eight as of 2023 with the addition of the Sikh and Parsi categories. This change came after significant campaigning by Pakistani Sikhs for recognition as a religion in 2017. The change also had been mandated by a Pakistani chief justice ruling in October 2018 that in the next census, a separate category for Sikhs would be provided under the religion question.

The question asking for respondents' mother tongue also saw its number of categories increase. Whereas in 2017, only ten categories were listed (Urdu, Punjabi, Sindhi, Pashto, Balochi, Kashmiri, Saraiki, Hindko, Brahui and Other), the form for the 2023 census has 14 choices. Shina, Balti, Kalasha and Kohistani are recognized in the 2023 form as valid options to select in the language question.

The nationality question also saw an improvement, going from a binary option asking respondents whether they were Pakistani or not, to giving respondents more options. The 2023 form includes five choices Pakistani, Afghan, Bangladeshi, Chinese, or other.

From December 2022 to January 2023, trainers and enumerators prepared for the census. On 6 December 2022, the training of master trainers began with an inauguration ceremony. By 19 December, 2,875 trainers at the divisional level began their training and preparation across the country. Finally, on 7 January, a group of 121,000 field staff at the tehsil level are expected to begin their training.

== Enumeration ==
As of 15 April 2023, out of 156 districts, 100% work had been completed in 122 districts – while over 90% work had been completed in the remaining districts. Census work would continue in cities including Karachi, Lahore and Faisalabad, while the date had been extended in 20 more districts including Sindh's Jacobabad, as well as the Baluchistan province.

As of 22 April 2023, over 235 million people had been enumerated – up by more than 10% from the 2017 census, or by about 22.2 million people. Census enumeration was then extended again until 30 April 2023, with a pause between 21 and 25 April, because of the Eid holidays. Most of the remaining enumeration would focus on Karachi, Hyderabad and Quetta. On 28 April, the enumeration was once again extended until 15 May.

Until 6 May 2023, a total of 241,831,019 people were counted all over Pakistan, or 28.6 million more than during the 2017 Census. Later on 12 May 2023, a total of 238,659,411 people had been counted (a number that included Islamabad Capital Territory, but excluded Gilgit-Baltistan and Azad Jammu and Kashmir).

On 22 May 2023, the enumeration concluded all over Pakistan although several areas in the mountainous north continued to be enumerated until 30 May 2023 because of heavy snowfall in the areas and security concerns. Additionally, people who were not enumerated were able to call the Pakistan Bureau of Statistics until 30 May and still be counted.

== Results ==
On 5 August 2023, the Council of Common Interests (CCI) "unanimously" approved the results of the 2023 digital census. The population of four provinces and ICT increased to 241.49 million with an annual growth rate of 2.55%, according to the census results; the total national population including Gilgit-Baltistan and Azad Kashmir was 247.54 million. The rural population was 61.18 percent of the total population in Pakistan while the urban population 38.82 percent. For certain sensitive areas and some collective residences, totalling to 1,041,342 people, only population, gender and urban/rural population could be determined, leaving the population counted for other tables to be 240,458,089.

Administrative Unit	Population (2017)	Population (2023)	Annualized Growth
Khyber Pakthunkhwa	35,501,964	40,856,097	▲2.38%
Punjab	109,989,655	127,688,922	▲2.53%
Sindh	47,854,510	55,696,147	▲2.57%
Balochistan	12,335,129	14,894,402	▲3.20%
ICT	2,003,368	2,363,863	▲2.80%
Azad Kashmir	4,045,367	4,333,467	
Gilgit-Baltistan	1,492,924	1,709,049	
Four provinces and ICT	207,684,626	241,499,431	▲2.55%
Total Pakistan	213,222,917	247,541,947	

=== Religious demographics ===
Religious groups in Pakistan (2023)
Religious group	Pakistan		Punjab		Sindh		Khyber Pakhtunkhwa		Balochistan		ICT		AJK		Gilgit– Baltistan	
Religious group	Total Population	Percentage	Pop.	%	Pop.	%	Pop.	%	Pop.	%	Pop.	%	Pop.	%	Pop.	%
Islam	231,686,709	96.35%	124,462,897	97.75%	50,126,428	90.09%	40,486,153	99.62%	14,429,568	99.09%	2,181,663	95.55%	—N/a	—N/a	—N/a	—N/a
Hinduism	5,217,216	2.17%	249,716	0.2%	4,901,407	8.81%	6,102	0.02%	59,107	0.41%	884	0.04%	—N/a	—N/a	—N/a	—N/a
Christianity	3,300,788	1.37%	2,458,924	1.93%	546,968	0.98%	134,884	0.33%	62,731	0.43%	97,281	4.26%	—N/a	—N/a	—N/a	—N/a
Ahmadiyya	162,684	0.07%	140,512	0.11%	18,266	0.03%	951	0%	557	0%	2,398	0.11%	—N/a	—N/a	—N/a	—N/a
Sikhism	15,998	0.01%	5,649	0%	5,182	0.01%	4,050	0.01%	1,057	0.01%	60	0%	—N/a	—N/a	—N/a	—N/a
Zoroastrianism	2,348	0.001%	358	0%	1,763	0%	36	0%	181	0%	10	0%	—N/a	—N/a	—N/a	—N/a
Others (inc. Kalashas, Baháʼís, Buddhists, Jews)	72,346	0.03%	15,249	0.01%	38,395	0.07%	8,944	0.02%	8,810	0.06%	948	0.04%	—N/a	—N/a	—N/a	—N/a
Total responses	240,458,089	99.57%	127,333,305	99.72%	55,638,409	99.9%	40,641,120	99.47%	14,562,011	97.77%	2,283,244	96.59%	—N/a	—N/a	—N/a	—N/a
Total population	241,499,431	100%	127,688,922	100%	55,696,147	100%	40,856,097	100%	14,894,402	100%	2,363,863	100%	—N/a	—N/a	—N/a	—N/a

=== Language demographics ===
Languages of Pakistan (2023)
1. Punjabi (37.0%)
2. Pashto (18.1%)
3. Sindhi (14.3%)
4. Saraiki (12.0%)
5. Urdu (9.25%)
6. Balochi (3.38%)
7. Hindko (2.32%)
8. Brahui (1.16%)
9. Mewati (0.46%)
10. Kohistani (0.43%)
11. Kashmiri (0.11%)
12. Shina (0.05%)
13. Balti (0.02%)
14. Kalasha (0.00%)
15. Others (1.38%)

Compared to the previous census, the number of Urdu speaking people increased the most to nearly 9.3%. Balochi language increased slightly from 3% to 3.4%. However, Punjabi speaking population reduced to 37%. Sindhi, Pashto and Saraiki speaking population remained relatively stable. The question asking for respondents mother tongue also saw its number of categories increase including Shina, Balti, Kalasha, Kohistani and Mewati. Pakistan Bureau of Statistics released language results of the 2023 census on 19 July 2024, excluding data from Gilgit-Baltistan and Azad Kashmir, therefore Shina and Balti population might not be exact.

== Timeline ==
- 23 February 2022: The National Census Coordination Centre (NCCC) was inaugurated in preparation for the census. It will monitor live census data and information.
- 20 July 2022: Pilot phase of census begins as information technology deployed across 429 census blocks.
- 3 August 2022: Pilot phase of census ends successfully.
- 20 February 2023: Self enumeration portal is inaugurated for citizens to fill in data by themselves online.
- 1 March 2023 to 30 May 2023: More than 121,000 trained field staff are physically visiting people all over Pakistan & collecting data on their allocated tablets.
- 19 July 2024: Release of preliminary results.

== See also ==
- Census in Pakistan
- Demographics of Pakistan
- Self-enumeration Portal
