= Ministry of Statistics =

Ministry of Statistics may refer to:

- Ministry of Statistics (Pakistan), Pakistan
- Ministry of Statistics & Analysis (Minstat), Republic of Belarus
- Ministry of Statistics and Programme Implementation (India)
- Statistical Committee of Armenia
