= Deh 25 A Jamrao =

Village in Sanghar District, Pakistan

Coordinates: 26°07′44″N 68°46′35″E

Deh 25 A Jamrao, also known as Daaney Waali 25, is a small village in the Sanghar District of Pakistan. It is located 12 miles west of Sanghar, and 28 miles east of Nawabshah on Nawabshah-Sanghar road. The primary industry of the village is agriculture. According to the 1998 census of Pakistan, the village had a population 3000, of which 2% were living in the urban centers.

== Amenities ==
Deh 25 A Jamrao has a mosque, a few shops and a digital telephone exchange and primary schools for girls and boys. The two major schools in the village are the Government Boys High School and the Government Girls Primary School in the village. The Government High School is situated on Nawabshah Road.
