= Self-enumeration Portal =

Platform for the digital census in Pakistan

Self Enumeration Portal
- Website type: Web portal
- Headquarters: Islamabad, Pakistan
- Owner: Government of Pakistan
- Website: https://self.pbs.gov.pk/welcome
- Registration: Required
- Launched: February 2023
- Current status: Active

Self-enumeration Portal (SEP) is a nation-wide digital census's data collection process and management platform initially launched by the Government of Pakistan. Self-enumeration Portal is the first digital initiative taken by the Pakistan Bureau of Statistics (PBS) to make it possible for Pakistani residents to take part in the digital census from the convenience of their own homes. Pakistan become the first nation in South Asia to provide the option of self-enumeration after it reaches this milestone.

== History ==
The portal is a joint accomplishment of Pakistan Bureau of Statistics (PBS), National Database and Registration Authority (NADRA), Pakistan Space & Upper Atmosphere Research Commission (SUPARCO), Pakistani provincial governments, the military forces of Pakistan, and the National Telecom Corporation (NTC). The Self-enumeration Portal for the population and housing census 2023, was launched by Federal Minister of Information Technology and Telecommunications (IT & Telecom) Syed Aminul Haque in February 2023.

== See also ==
- Pakistan Citizen's Portal
- 2023 Census of Pakistan
