= Urbanization by sovereign state =

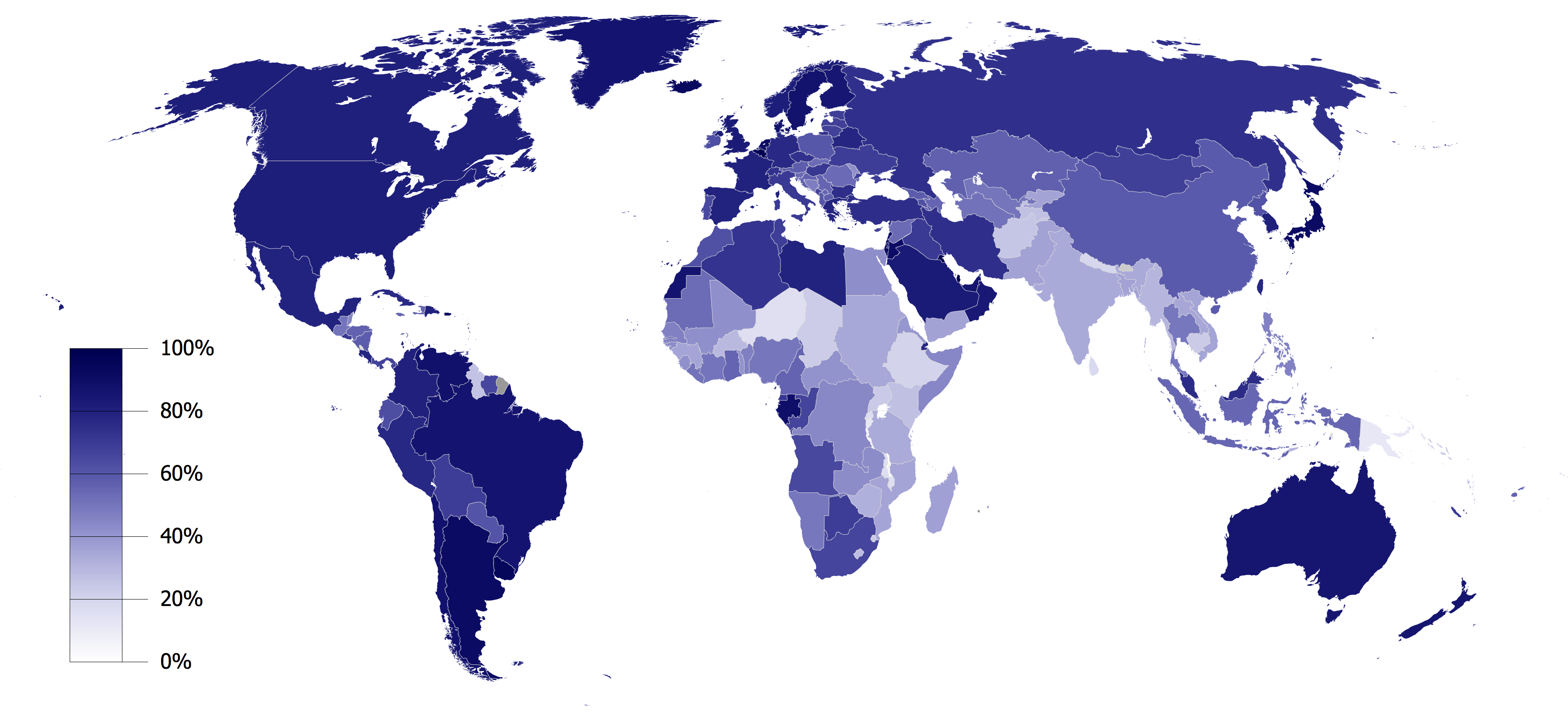
The percentage of urbanized population by country (2018 data)

This is a list of countries by urbanization.

== Methodology ==
There are two measures of the degree of urbanization of a population. The first, urban population, describes the percentage of the total population living in urban areas, as defined by the country.

The second measure, rate of urbanization, describes the projected average rate of change of the size of the urban population over the given period of time.

As of 2022, countries with more than 80% of people living in urban areas include the United States, Canada, Mexico, Brazil, Argentina, Chile, Japan, Australia, the United Kingdom, France, Finland, Denmark, Israel, Spain and South Korea.

193 United Nations member states plus the Vatican are given a number, other entries are italicized and unnumbered.

== List ==
| Country or territory | Urban population (2022) | % of total population (2023) | % change in urbanization rate from 2020–2025 | Rural population (Estimated) |
|---|---|---|---|---|
| Kuwait | 4,268,870 | 100.0 | 1.35 | 0 |
| Monaco | 36,470 | 100.0 | 0.50 | 0 |
| Nauru | 12,670 | 100.0 | 0.18 | 0 |
| Singapore | 5,637,020 | 100.0 | 0.74 | 0 |
| Vatican City | - | 100.0 | 0.00 | - |
| Anguilla (UK) | - | 100.0 | 0.47 | - |
| Bermuda (UK) | 63,530 | 100.0 | –0.20 | 0 |
| Cayman Islands (UK) | 68,710 | 100.0 | 1.13 | 0 |
| Gibraltar (UK) | 32,650 | 100.0 | 0.45 | 0 |
| Hong Kong (China) | 7,346,100 | 100.0 | 0.58 | 0 |
| Macau (China) | 695,170 | 100.0 | 1.46 | 0 |
| Sint Maarten (Netherlands) | 42,850 | 100.0 | 1.16 | 0 |
| Qatar | 2,676,740 | 99.4 | 1.66 | 16,157 |
| Belgium | 11,469,980 | 98.2 | 0.38 | 210,244 |
| San Marino | 32,900 | 97.8 | 0.41 | 740 |
| U.S. Virgin Islands (US) | 101,340 | 96.2 | –0.11 | 4,001 |
| Uruguay | 3,275,200 | 95.8 | 0.40 | 143,589 |
| Guam (US) | 163,340 | 95.2 | 0.84 | 8,236 |
| Malta | 503,890 | 94.9 | 0.28 | 27,078 |
| Turks and Caicos Islands (UK) | 42,980 | 94.2 | 1.46 | 2,646 |
| Iceland | 359,050 | 94.0 | 0.74 | 22,918 |
| Puerto Rico (US) | 3,015,920 | 93.6 | −0.12 | 206,217 |
| Netherlands | 16,441,730 | 93.2 | 0.59 | 1,199,611 |
| Israel | 8,865,820 | 92.9 | 1.51 | 677,665 |
| Argentina | 42,696,480 | 92.5 | 0.97 | 3,461,877 |
| Luxembourg | 600,080 | 92.1 | 1.43 | 51,473 |
| Northern Mariana Islands (US) | 45,580 | 92.1 | 0.36 | 3,909 |
| Japan | 115,058,680 | 92.0 | −0.25 | 10,005,103 |
| Jordan | 10,363,480 | 92.0 | 0.98 | 901,172 |
| Gabon | 2,167,650 | 91.0 | 2.27 | 214,383 |
| Saint Pierre and Miquelon (France) | - | 90.1 | 0.75 | - |
| Bahrain | 1,321,230 | 89.9 | 1.99 | 148,425 |
| Lebanon | 4,900,250 | 89.4 | –1.23 | 581,014 |
| Curaçao (Netherlands) | 133,530 | 89.0 | 0.57 | 16,504 |
| Sweden | 9,280,100 | 88.7 | 0.89 | 1,182,335 |
| Denmark | 5,216,340 | 88.5 | 0.54 | 677,830 |
| Oman | 4,015,700 | 88.4 | 2.32 | 526,947 |
| Venezuela | 25,012,470 | 88.4 | 1.16 | 3,282,180 |
| Chile | 17,234,030 | 88.0 | 0.78 | 2,350,095 |
| Greenland (Denmark) | 49,710 | 87.9 | 0.41 | 6,843 |
| Andorra | 70,090 | 87.8 | 0.11 | 9,739 |
| Brazil | 188,517,730 | 87.8 | 0.87 | 26,199,507 |
| United Arab Emirates | 8,265,050 | 87.8 | 1.50 | 1,148,447 |
| American Samoa (US) | 38,600 | 87.2 | 0.26 | 5,666 |
| New Zealand | 4,452,020 | 87.0 | 0.92 | 665,244 |
| Australia | 22,491,670 | 86.6 | 1.27 | 3,480,235 |
| Finland | 4,760,530 | 85.8 | 0.42 | 787,873 |
| Saudi Arabia | 30,848,830 | 85.0 | 1.69 | 5,443,911 |
| United Kingdom | 56,522,520 | 84.6 | 0.80 | 10,288,541 |
| Dominican Republic | 9,415,140 | 84.4 | 1.64 | 1,740,240 |
| Norway | 4,565,650 | 84.0 | 1.32 | 869,648 |
| Bahamas | 342,300 | 83.6 | 1.02 | 67,150 |
| United States | 276,908,630 | 83.3 | 0.96 | 55,514,635 |
| Costa Rica | 4,250,460 | 82.6 | 1.50 | 895,375 |
| Colombia | 42,562,640 | 82.4 | 1.01 | 9,091,049 |
| Palau | 14,800 | 82.4 | 1.59 | 3,161 |
| Canada | 31,825,970 | 81.9 | 0.95 | 7,033,260 |
| France | 55,402,740 | 81.8 | 0.67 | 12,324,817 |
| Libya | 5,538,570 | 81.6 | 1.45 | 1,248,893 |
| Mexico | 103,660,850 | 81.6 | 1.40 | 23,374,505 |
| Spain | 38,845,700 | 81.6 | 0.24 | 8,759,325 |
| South Korea | 42,039,230 | 81.5 | 0.31 | 9,542,645 |
| Belarus | 7,412,540 | 80.7 | 0.28 | 1,772,519 |
| Greece | 8,378,760 | 80.7 | 0.11 | 2,003,571 |
| Taiwan | - | 80.1 | 0.65 | - |
| Falkland Islands (UK) | - | 79.7 | 0.53 | - |
| Brunei | 354,060 | 79.1 | 1.44 | 93,556 |
| Marshall Islands | 32,640 | 78.9 | 0.61 | 8,728 |
| Peru | 26,799,750 | 78.9 | 1.33 | 7,166,472 |
| Malaysia | 26,544,440 | 78.7 | 1.87 | 7,184,188 |
| Djibouti | 878,520 | 78.6 | 1.56 | 239,189 |
| Germany | 65,067,460 | 77.8 | 0.13 | 18,566,782 |
| Palestine | 3,898,260 | 77.6 | 2.85 | 1,125,271 |
| Cuba | 8,678,350 | 77.5 | 0.19 | 2,519,521 |
| Turkey | 65,453,230 | 77.5 | 1.11 | 19,002,551 |
| Iran | 68,013,040 | 77.3 | 1.32 | 19,972,773 |
| Bulgaria | 4,936,940 | 76.7 | −0.28 | 1,500,004 |
| São Tomé and Príncipe | 172,250 | 76.4 | 2.96 | 53,208 |
| Cook Islands (New Zealand) | - | 76.2 | 0.52 | - |
| El Salvador | 4,737,530 | 75.4 | 1.33 | 1,545,985 |
| Algeria | 33,575,040 | 75.3 | 1.99 | 11,013,678 |
| Russia | 108,359,440 | 75.3 | 0.11 | 35,548,976 |
| Czech Republic | 7,937,600 | 74.6 | 0.20 | 2,702,943 |
| Equatorial Guinea | 1,239,600 | 74.4 | 3.62 | 426,529 |
| Switzerland | 6,502,140 | 74.2 | 0.79 | 2,260,852 |
| Botswana | 1,899,700 | 72.9 | 2.47 | 706,200 |
| Hungary | 6,996,220 | 72.9 | 0.05 | 2,600,795 |
| New Caledonia (France) | 194,710 | 72.7 | 1.72 | 73,115 |
| Dominica | 52,150 | 72.0 | 0.84 | 20,281 |
| Italy | 42,234,940 | 72.0 | 0.27 | 16,424,699 |
| Iraq | 31,749,760 | 71.6 | 2.91 | 12,593,480 |
| Bolivia | 8,658,340 | 71.2 | 1.87 | 3,502,250 |
| Tunisia | 8,675,720 | 70.5 | 1.34 | 3,630,266 |
| Ukraine | 26,569,220 | 70.1 | −0.27 | 11,332,674 |
| Estonia | 938,910 | 69.8 | -0.03 | 406,177 |
| Panama | 3,048,140 | 69.5 | 1.92 | 1,337,673 |
| Congo | 4,103,830 | 69.2 | 3.19 | 1,826,265 |
| Mongolia | 2,342,490 | 69.1 | 1.40 | 1,047,515 |
| South Africa | 40,928,490 | 68.8 | 1.72 | 18,560,594 |
| Angola | 24,229,340 | 68.7 | 4.04 | 11,041,135 |
| Latvia | 1,288,130 | 68.7 | −0.68 | 586,881 |
| Lithuania | 1,938,680 | 68.7 | −0.12 | 883,278 |
| Montenegro | 420,720 | 68.5 | 0.45 | 193,470 |
| Cape Verde | 400,640 | 68.0 | 1.83 | 188,536 |
| Portugal | 7,014,160 | 67.9 | 0.44 | 3,315,924 |
| Cyprus | 837,380 | 67.0 | 0.76 | 412,441 |
| Suriname | 409,800 | 66.4 | 0.88 | 207,369 |
| Tuvalu | 7,410 | 66.2 | 2.08 | 3,783 |
| Morocco | 24,196,350 | 65.1 | 1.88 | 12,971,607 |
| Ecuador | 11,623,250 | 64.8 | 1.62 | 6,313,864 |
| Albania | 1,772,140 | 64.6 | 1.29 | 971,114 |
| China | 897,578,430 | 64.6 | 1.78 | 491,861,245 |
| Gambia | 1,727,830 | 64.5 | 3.75 | 951,038 |
| Ireland | 3,290,770 | 64.5 | 1.15 | 1,811,200 |
| Armenia | 1,767,630 | 63.7 | 0.23 | 1,007,249 |
| North Korea | 16,401,830 | 63.2 | 0.85 | 9,549,167 |
| Paraguay | 4,259,530 | 63.1 | 1.64 | 2,490,757 |
| French Polynesia (France) | 190,410 | 62.3 | 0.65 | 115,223 |
| Serbia | 4,093,405 | 62.1 | 0.04 | 2,497,938 |
| Georgia | 2,238,530 | 60.7 | 0.35 | 1,449,602 |
| Honduras | 6,217,980 | 60.2 | 2.48 | 4,110,957 |
| Poland | 22,142,390 | 60.2 | −0.16 | 14,639,188 |
| Nicaragua | 4,138,180 | 59.8 | 1.45 | 2,781,720 |
| Haiti | 6,814,300 | 59.7 | 2.47 | 4,599,576 |
| Austria | 5,357,840 | 59.5 | 0.68 | 3,646,933 |
| North Macedonia | 1,216,460 | 59.5 | 0.61 | 828,044 |
| Cameroon | 16,395,040 | 59.3 | 3.43 | 11,252,574 |
| Ghana | 19,621,880 | 59.2 | 3.06 | 13,522,648 |
| Seychelles | 70,000 | 58.8 | 0.99 | 49,048 |
| Fiji | 541,390 | 58.7 | 1.37 | 380,871 |
| Croatia | 2,244,690 | 58.6 | 0.05 | 1,585,821 |
| Indonesia | 159,608,950 | 58.6 | 1.99 | 112,764,651 |
| Kazakhstan | 11,378,780 | 58.2 | 1.19 | 8,172,317 |
| Kiribati | 74,880 | 57.8 | 2.77 | 54,670 |
| Mauritania | 2,695,950 | 57.7 | 3.84 | 1,975,890 |
| Azerbaijan | 5,798,040 | 57.6 | 1.38 | 4,268,002 |
| World | 4,522,994,900 | 57.5 | 1.73 | 3,343,083,187 |
| Jamaica | 1,611,830 | 57.4 | 0.79 | 1,196,197 |
| Syria | 12,560,280 | 57.4 | 5.38 | 9,321,811 |
| Slovenia | 1,177,450 | 56.1 | 0.54 | 921,396 |
| Namibia | 1,385,060 | 54.9 | 3.64 | 1,137,845 |
| Romania | 10,378,520 | 54.7 | –0.15 | 8,594,832 |
| Nigeria | 116,965,440 | 54.3 | 3.92 | 98,432,608 |
| Saint Vincent and the Grenadines | 56,000 | 54.3 | 0.94 | 47,127 |
| Slovakia | 2,928,200 | 54.0 | 0.17 | 2,494,393 |
| Turkmenistan | 3,440,080 | 54.0 | 2.23 | 2,930,439 |
| Liberia | 2,813,870 | 53.6 | 3.41 | 2,435,888 |
| Thailand | 37,919,840 | 53.6 | 1.43 | 32,826,130 |
| Isle of Man (UK) | 45,020 | 53.5 | 0.97 | 39,129 |
| Trinidad and Tobago | 816,660 | 53.4 | 0.23 | 712,652 |
| Ivory Coast | 14,829,620 | 53.1 | 3.38 | 13,097,761 |
| Guatemala | 9,141,700 | 53.1 | 2.59 | 8,074,834 |
| Uzbekistan | 17,990,170 | 50.5 | 1.25 | 17,633,929 |
| Bosnia and Herzegovina | 1,611,620 | 50.3 | 0.61 | 1,592,396 |
| Kosovo | 1,585,566 | 50.2 | - | 1,572,929 |
| Benin | 6,614,210 | 50.1 | 3.74 | 6,587,806 |
| British Virgin Islands (UK) | 15,440 | 49.7 | 1.73 | 15,626 |
| Senegal | 8,499,950 | 49.6 | 3.59 | 8,637,046 |
| Philippines | 55,441,750 | 48.3 | 2.04 | 59,343,991 |
| Niue (New Zealand) | - | 48.2 | 1.43 | - |
| Somalia | 8,327,850 | 47.9 | 4.20 | 9,058,111 |
| DR Congo | 46,373,410 | 47.4 | 4.33 | 51,460,329 |
| Belize | 188,030 | 46.6 | 2.30 | 215,468 |
| Zambia | 9,160,290 | 46.3 | 4.15 | 10,624,310 |
| Mali | 10,265,850 | 46.2 | 4.57 | 11,954,583 |
| Guinea-Bissau | 948,370 | 45.5 | 3.22 | 1,135,959 |
| Togo | 3,886,440 | 44.5 | 3.60 | 4,846,804 |
| Bhutan | 341,820 | 44.4 | 2.52 | 428,045 |
| Aruba (Netherlands) | 46,890 | 44.3 | 0.77 | 58,955 |
| Sierra Leone | 3,771,970 | 44.3 | 3.02 | 4,742,427 |
| Central African Republic | 2,405,730 | 43.6 | 3.32 | 3,111,953 |
| Moldova | 1,096,120 | 43.4 | 0.09 | 1,429,539 |
| Eritrea | 1,570,320 | 43.3 | 3.67 | 2,056,193 |
| Egypt | 47,689,120 | 43.1 | 1.90 | 62,959,045 |
| Faroe Islands (Denmark) | 22,710 | 43.0 | 0.89 | 30,104 |
| Maldives | 217,560 | 42.0 | 2.34 | 300,440 |
| Mauritius | 515,240 | 40.9 | 0.28 | 744,481 |
| Saint Helena, Ascension and Tristan da Cunha (UK) | - | 40.7 | 0.98 | - |
| Madagascar | 11,809,740 | 40.6 | 4.26 | 17,278,338 |
| Bangladesh | 67,979,820 | 40.5 | 2.88 | 99,871,585 |
| Yemen | 13,205,030 | 39.8 | 3.71 | 19,971,442 |
| Vietnam | 38,063,120 | 39.5 | 2.70 | 58,299,462 |
| Mozambique | 12,590,070 | 38.8 | 4.24 | 19,858,461 |
| Laos | 2,830,480 | 38.2 | 2.99 | 4,579,143 |
| Guinea | 5,220,540 | 38.1 | 3.64 | 8,482,716 |
| Pakistan | 88,979,080 | 38.0 | 2.10 | 145,176,394 |
| Kyrgyzstan | 2,612,870 | 37.8 | 2.05 | 4,300,593 |
| Tanzania | 24,025,880 | 37.4 | 4.89 | 40,214,580 |
| Grenada | 46,250 | 37.1 | 0.86 | 78,416 |
| India | 508,368,360 | 36.4 | 2.33 | 888,270,723 |
| Sudan | 16,854,090 | 36.3 | 3.43 | 29,576,014 |
| Zimbabwe | 5,287,040 | 32.5 | 2.41 | 10,980,775 |
| Burkina Faso | 7,227,720 | 32.5 | 4.75 | 15,011,418 |
| Timor-Leste | 430,210 | 32.5 | 3.31 | 893,513 |
| Myanmar | 17,213,310 | 32.1 | 1.85 | 36,405,671 |
| Barbados | 88,220 | 31.4 | 0.46 | 192,761 |
| Guernsey (UK) | - | 31.2 | 0.68 | - |
| Jersey (UK) | - | 31.2 | 0.68 | - |
| Saint Kitts and Nevis | 14,770 | 31.1 | 1.06 | 32,731 |
| Lesotho | 690,430 | 30.4 | 2.77 | 1,580,458 |
| Comoros | 249,890 | 30.1 | 2.97 | 580,311 |
| Kenya | 15,669,050 | 29.5 | 4.09 | 37,446,170 |
| Tajikistan | 2,783,590 | 28.2 | 2.73 | 7,086,634 |
| Guyana | 218,530 | 27.2 | 1.01 | 584,874 |
| Afghanistan | 10,946,830 | 26.9 | 3.34 | 29,742,752 |
| Uganda | 12,360,020 | 26.8 | 5.41 | 33,757,666 |
| Solomon Islands | 185,300 | 26.0 | 3.57 | 527,392 |
| Vanuatu | 84,350 | 26.0 | 2.55 | 240,073 |
| Cambodia | 4,211,080 | 25.6 | 3.06 | 12,238,451 |
| Eswatini | 295,320 | 24.8 | 2.42 | 895,649 |
| Chad | 4,264,760 | 24.4 | 4.10 | 13,211,887 |
| Antigua and Barbuda | 22,830 | 24.3 | 0.87 | 71,123 |
| Federated States of Micronesia | 26,500 | 23.4 | 1.52 | 86,752 |
| Ethiopia | 27,959,130 | 23.2 | 4.40 | 92,554,361 |
| Tonga | 24,710 | 23.2 | 0.99 | 81,799 |
| Nepal | 6,552,760 | 21.9 | 3.09 | 23,371,114 |
| South Sudan | 2,274,960 | 21.2 | 4.12 | 8,455,040 |
| Saint Lucia | 34,260 | 19.2 | 0.98 | 144,178 |
| Sri Lanka | 4,220,160 | 19.2 | 1.22 | 17,759,840 |
| Malawi | 3,668,880 | 18.3 | 4.41 | 16,379,489 |
| Rwanda | 2,441,370 | 17.9 | 3.07 | 11,198,397 |
| Samoa | 39,170 | 17.5 | −0.03 | 184,659 |
| Niger | 4,427,580 | 17.1 | 4.72 | 21,465,491 |
| Burundi | 1,858,290 | 14.8 | 5.43 | 10,698,244 |
| Liechtenstein | 5,720 | 14.6 | 1.15 | 33,456 |
| Papua New Guinea | 1,377,570 | 13.7 | 2.91 | 8,678,613 |
| Montserrat (UK) | - | 9.3 | 0.94 | - |
| Tokelau (New Zealand) | - | 0.0 | 0.00 | - |
| Wallis and Futuna (France) | - | 0.0 | 0.00 | - |

== See also ==
- List of Brazilian federative units by urbanization rate
