= Pakistan Citizen's Portal =

Pakistani government agency

- Abbreviation: PCP
- Formation: 28 October 2018
- Headquarters: Islamabad, Pakistan
- Owner: Government of Pakistan
- Headed by: Prime Minister of Pakistan
- Parent organization: PM's Performance Delivery Unit (PMDU)
- Website: https://citizenportal.gov.pk

The Pakistan Citizen's Portal (PCP) is a Pakistani government agency. It began as a government-owned mobile application for the citizens of Pakistan through which they can lodge their complaints with the government.

== History ==
The Prime Minister of Pakistan, Imran Khan, launched Pakistan Citizen's Portal (PCP) in October 2018.

== Functioning ==
The Pakistan Citizen's Portal operates under the Prime Minister's Performance Delivery Unit (PMDU).

== Other platforms ==
- The Pakistan Citizen's Portal launched its web-based services and helpline on 28 September 2020.
- In October 2020, manual complaint lodging facility was provided at the dashboards of government offices for illiterate and physically challenged people.

== Achievements ==
- The Pakistan Citizen's Portal was ranked as the second best government app in the World Government Summit held in Dubai, out of a total 4,646 mobile applications by 87 countries.

== See also ==
- Self-enumeration Portal
