= Census in Pakistan =

Decennial census

Pakistan Census مردم شماری پاکستان
- Frequency: Decennially (every 10 years)
- Locations: Plot No. 21, Mauve Area, G-9/1, Islamabad; Pakistan 44080
- Country: Pakistan
- Inaugurated: 1951; 75 years ago
- Previous event: May 2023; 3 years ago
- People: Asif Bajwa; Chief Statistician/Chief Census Commissioner
- Website: www.pbs.gov.pk

The Census in Pakistan is a legally decennial census and a descriptive count of Pakistan's population on Census Day, and of their dwellings, conducted and supervised by the Pakistan Bureau of Statistics. The most recent census was the 2023 Pakistani census.

== Overview ==
A national census is mandated by the Constitution of Pakistan to be held every ten years. After the independence of Pakistan in 1947, the first census took place in 1951 under Finance Minister Sir Malik Ghulam, serving under Prime Minister Liaquat Ali Khan. Since 1951, there have been 7 nationwide censuses (1961, 1972, 1981, 1998, 2017 and 2023). The censuses have often faced delays and postponements due to politicization. For example, the 6th national census after 1998 (which itself faced a delay of 7 years) was scheduled to take place in 2001, later being postponed to 2008, and then again to 2010. There were multiple census counts completed in April 2012, but were subsequently thrown out as being "unreliable". It was ultimately conducted in 2017. The most recent census in 2023 recorded a total population throughout the country of 241,499,431 (excluding Gilgit-Baltistan and Azad Kashmir).

== Census ==
=== 1951 ===
According to 1951 census, the Dominion of Pakistan (both West and East Pakistan) had a population of 75.7 million, in which West Pakistan had a population of 33.7 million and East Pakistan (today Bangladesh) had a population of 42 million. In 1951, minorities constituted 14.4% of the Pakistani population (this includes East Pakistan, today Bangladesh). Breaking down between East and West Pakistan, the population of West Pakistan was 3.44% non-Muslim (1.16 million out of 33.7 million), while East Pakistan (today Bangladesh) was 23.20% non-Muslim (9.744 million out of 42 million). Total non-Muslim population on both sides added up to 10.90 million.

=== 1961 ===
According to the 1961 census, the population of Pakistan was 93 million, with 42.8 million residing in West Pakistan and 50 million residing in East Pakistan. The literacy was 19.2%, in which East Pakistan had a literacy rate of 21.5% while West Pakistan had a literacy rate of 16.9%. Hindus in East Pakistan were 18.4%.

=== 1972 ===
The scheduled 1971 census was postponed due to the political crisis of 1970 followed by the India-Pakistan war of 1971 and subsequent loss of East Pakistan through the independence of Bangladesh. In 1970, the population was 65 million in the East Pakistan (Bangladesh) and 58 million in West Pakistan.

According to the 1972 census, the population of Pakistan was 65.3 million. After 1972, the Census Organization was merged into the Ministry of Interior.

=== 1981 ===
According to the 1981 census, the population of Pakistan was 83.783 million.

=== 1998 ===
The 1998 Census of Pakistan was the fifth Pakistani national census. It provided a detailed enumeration of the population of Pakistan at the time it was conducted under the authority of the Pakistan Bureau of Statistics, an agency of the Government of Pakistan. According to the 1998 census, the population of Pakistan proper (excluding disputed territories) stood at 130,857,717 people. With the inclusion of the population of Azad Jammu & Kashmir and Gilgit-Baltistan, the population stood at 134,714,017 people. Despite being mandated by the Constitution of Pakistan to be held every 10 years, this was the first census to take place in Pakistan after the 1981 census that took place 17 years earlier, and the next census would not be held for another 19 years, until 2017. The inconsistencies in Pakistan's national elections are due in part to political turmoil and instability within the country.

A UN led census was to be conducted with staff training and GPS digitisation after 1998. As of 2015, the population of Pakistan was estimated at 191.71 million. As of 2016, the population of religious minorities in Pakistan was estimated to have increased to 3 million.

=== 2017 ===
The 2017 Census of Pakistan was a detailed enumeration of the Pakistani population which began on 15 March 2017 and ended on 25 May 2017. It was the first census taken in the country in the 21st century, nineteen years after the previous one in 1998, and it was carried out by the Pakistan Bureau of Statistics.

The census recorded a total population throughout the country of 213,222,917. (Note: The population of the four provinces and the Islamabad Capital Territory being 207,684,626, the population of Azad Jammu & Kashmir being 4,045,367, and the population of Gilgit-Baltistan being 1,492,924.) The results showed a massive population increase having occurred between 1998 and 2017 of 77.0 million people, or an increase of +56.5%. (Note: In 1998, the population of the four provinces and Islamabad Capital Territory being 132,352,279, the population of Azad Jammu & Kashmir being 2,972,501, and the population of Gilgit-Baltistan being 884,000. This is a total of 136,208,780.) The results also marked a significantly higher result compared to estimations made of the Pakistani population before the census, which had previously estimated the Pakistani population in 2017 to be between 195 million and 200 million.

Controversies regarding this census, focused around the populations of Pakistan's largest city, Karachi and the province of Sindh, resulted in another census being scheduled early in the year 2023. The results of that census will be used to delimitate constituencies for the 2023 Pakistani general election.

=== 2023 ===
The 2023 Census of Pakistan was the seventh national census and detailed enumeration of the Pakistani population. It was conducted by the Pakistan Bureau of Statistics. It was also the first ever digital census to be held in Pakistan, and the first in South Asia. It is the most recent census in Pakistan.

The census was initially held from 1 March 2023 to 1 April 2023. However, enumeration was later extended several times until 30 May 2023, because of incomplete enumeration in large cities such as Karachi, Lahore and Faisalabad, where people are more mobile and therefore harder to count, and in remote and rural Balochistan. The extension was also used by PBS officials and census takers for quality reviews, to check if all households and people were properly counted in each area. The 2023 census recorded a total population throughout the country of 247,541,947.

== See also ==
- Family planning in Pakistan
