= List of Brazilian federative units by urbanization rate =

This is a list of federative units in Brazil by Urban and Rural rate, the numbers are 2010 census of the IBGE

Rank	Federative unit	Urban Rate	Rural Rate
1	Rio de Janeiro	96.71	3.29
2	Federal District	96.62	3.38
3	São Paulo	95.88	4.12
4	Goiás	90.29	9.71
5	Amapá	89.81	10.19
6	Mato Grosso do Sul	85.64	14.36
7	Paraná	85.31	14.49
8	Espírito Santo	85.29	14.51
9	Rio Grande do Sul	85.10	14.90
10	Santa Catarina	83.99	16.01
11	Minas Gerais	83.38	16.62
12	Mato Grosso	81.90	18.10
13	Pernambuco	80.15	19.85
14	Amazonas	79.17	20.83
15	Tocantins	78.81	21.19
16	Rio Grande do Norte	77.82	22.18
17	Roraima	76.41	23.59
18	Paraíba	75.37	24.63
19	Ceará	75.09	24.91
20	Alagoas	73.64	26.36
21	Sergipe	73.51	26.49
22	Rondônia	73.22	26.78
23	Acre	72.61	27.39
24	Bahia	72.07	27.93
25	Pará	68.49	31.51
26	Piauí	65.77	34.23
27	Maranhão	63.07	36.93
