= 1998 Pakistani census =

5th Pakistani national census

Fifth National Census of Pakistan
| ← 1981 | 1998 | 2017 → |

General information
- Country: Pakistan
- Authority: Pakistan Bureau of Statistics

Results
- Total population: 132,352,000 (▲)
- Most populous province/territory: Punjab
- Least populous province/territory: Islamabad Capital Territory

The 1998 Census of Pakistan was the fifth Pakistani national census. It provided a detailed enumeration of the population of Pakistan at the time it was conducted under the authority of the Pakistan Bureau of Statistics, an agency of the Government of Pakistan. According to the 1998 census, the population of Pakistan proper (excluding disputed territories) stood at 130,857,717 people. With the inclusion of the population of Azad Jammu & Kashmir and Gilgit-Baltistan, the population stood at 134,714,017 people. Despite being mandated by the Constitution of Pakistan to be held every 10 years, this was the first census to take place in Pakistan after the 1981 census that took place 17 years earlier, and the next census would not be held for another 19 years, until 2017. The inconsistencies in Pakistan's national elections are due in part to political turmoil and instability within the country.

== City Results ==
This is the list of population of cities of Pakistan in 1998 census vs 2017 census.

| Rank | City | Population (1998 census) | Population (2017 census) | Province |
|---|---|---|---|---|
| 1 | Karachi | 9,339,023 | 14,910,352 | Sindh |
| 2 | Lahore | 5,143,495 | 11,126,285 | Punjab |
| 3 | Faisalabad | 1,977,246 | 3,203,846 | Punjab |
| 4 | Rawalpindi | 1,406,214 | 2,098,231 | Punjab |
| 5 | Peshawar | 1,405,150 | 1,970,042 | Khyber Pakhtunkhwa |
| 6 | Multan | 1,182,441 | 1,197,384 | Punjab |
| 7 | Hyderabad | 1,151,274 | 1,732,693 | Sindh |
| 8 | Gujranwala | 1,124,799 | 2,027,001 | Punjab |
| 9 | Quetta | 565,514 | 1,001,205 | Balochistan |
| 10 | Islamabad | 529,180 | 1,014,825 | Islamabad Capital Territory |

== See also ==
- Census in Pakistan
