= Pakistan Bureau of Statistics =

Pakistan's principal government institution in charge of statistics and census data

- پاکستان ادارہ شماریات
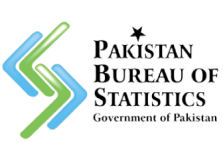

Agency overview
- Formed: July 14, 1950; 76 years ago
- Preceding agencies: Central Statistical Office; Federal Bureau of Statistics
- Headquarters: 21, Mauve Area, G-9/1, Islamabad Pakistan 44080
- Agency executives: Chief Statistician of Pakistan; Dr. Naeem Uz Zaffar
- Website: pbs.gov.pk

The Pakistan Bureau of Statistics (PBS) (Urdu: پاکستان ادارہ شماریات) is a federal agency under the Government of Pakistan. It is an attached department of the Ministry of Planning, Development & Special Initiatives. It works for collecting statistics in the country.

== History ==
In 1947, the Central Statistical Office (CSO) was set up by the government of Prime Minister Liaquat Ali Khan. In 1950, CSO became an attached department of the Economic Affairs Division. In 1972, on the recommendation of IBRD Mission, Prime Minister Zulfikar Ali Bhutto upgraded the Central Statistical Office to a full-fledged government division. In 1981, the bureau was reorganized and its technical wing (CSO) was converted into the then Federal Bureau of Statistics. Former Finance Minister Dr. Mahbub ul Haq further reorganized the bureau.

== See also ==
- Government of Pakistan
- Politics of Pakistan
- Statistics
