= England in the Middle Ages =

Period of English history from the 5th–15th centuries

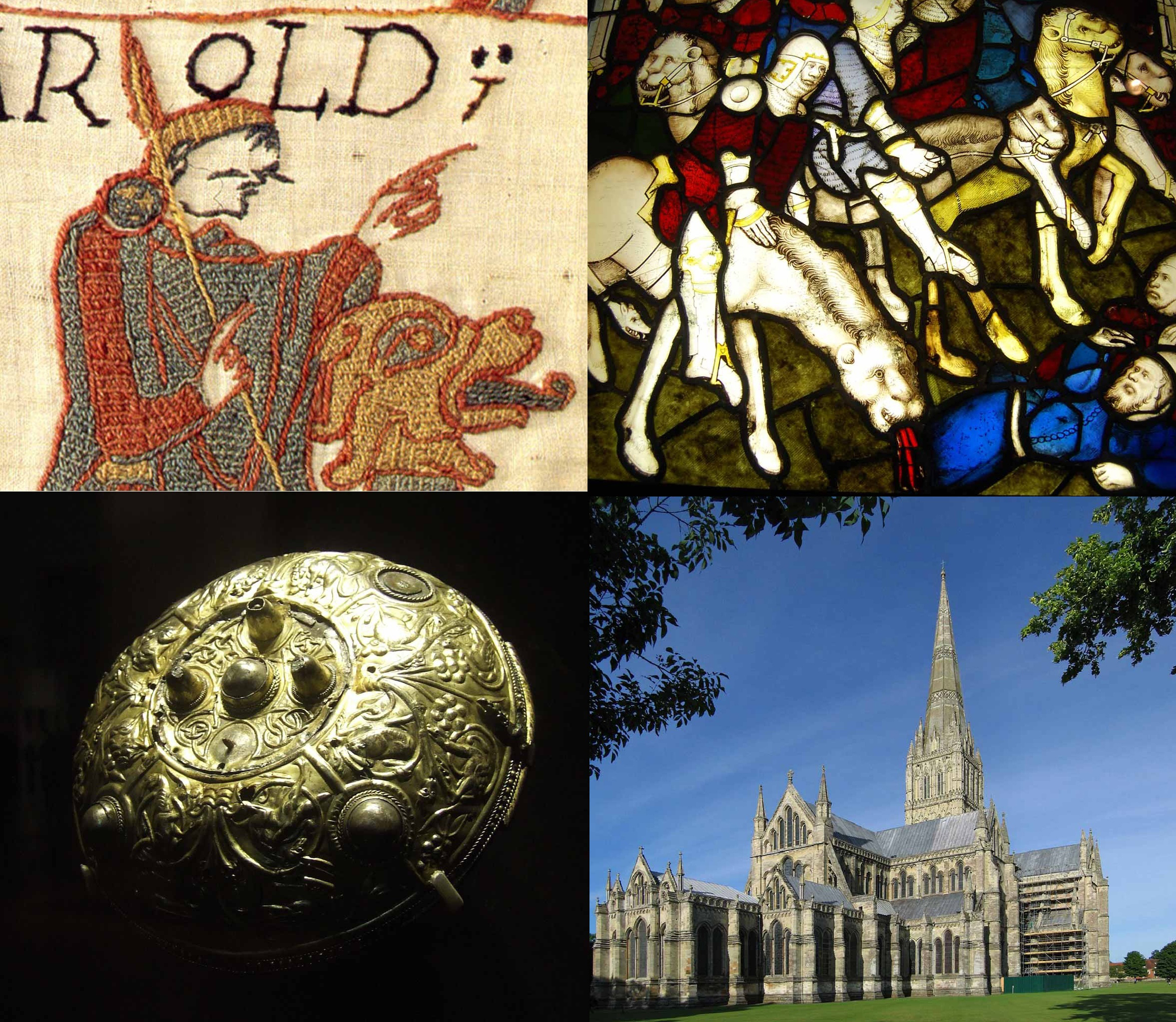
Clockwise, from top left: Detail of the 11th-century Bayeux Tapestry, showing Harold Godwinson; 15th-century stained glass from York Minster, showing a scene from the Apocalypse; Salisbury Cathedral, built in the 13th century; the 9th century Ormside Bowl.

England in the Middle Ages concerns the history of England during the medieval period, from the end of the 5th century through to the start of the early modern period in 1485. When England emerged from the collapse of the Western Roman Empire, the economy was in tatters and many of the towns abandoned. After several centuries of Germanic immigration, new identities and cultures began to emerge, developing into kingdoms that competed for power. A rich artistic culture flourished under the Anglo-Saxons, producing epic poems such as Beowulf and sophisticated metalwork. The Anglo-Saxons converted to Christianity in the 7th century, and a network of monasteries and convents were built across England. In the 8th and 9th centuries, England faced fierce Viking attacks, and the fighting lasted for many decades. Eventually, Wessex was established as the most powerful kingdom and promoted the growth of an English identity, culminating in the founding of the Kingdom of England in 927. Although England was ruled by Danes between 1016 and 1042, by the 1060s England was a powerful, centralised state with a strong military and successful economy.

The Norman invasion of England in 1066 led to the defeat and replacement of the Anglo-Saxon elite with Norman and French nobles and their supporters. William the Conqueror and his successors took over the existing state system, repressing local revolts and controlling the population through a network of castles. The new rulers introduced a feudal approach to governing England, eradicating the practice of slavery, but creating a much wider body of unfree labourers called serfs. The position of women in society changed as laws regarding land and lordship shifted. England's population more than doubled during the 12th and 13th centuries, fueling an expansion of the towns, cities, and trade, helped by warmer temperatures across Northern Europe. A new wave of monasteries and friaries was established while ecclesiastical reforms led to tensions between successive kings and archbishops. Despite developments in England's governance and legal system, infighting between the Anglo-Norman elite resulted in multiple civil wars and the loss of Normandy.

The 14th century in England saw the Great Famine and the Black Death, catastrophic events that killed around half of England's population, throwing the economy into chaos, and undermining the old political order. Social unrest followed, resulting in the Peasants' Revolt of 1381, while the changes in the economy resulted in the emergence of a new class of gentry, and the nobility began to exercise power through a system termed bastard feudalism. Nearly 1,500 villages were deserted by their inhabitants and many men and women sought new opportunities in the towns and cities. New technologies were introduced, and England produced some of the great medieval philosophers and natural scientists. English kings in the 14th and 15th centuries laid claim to the French throne, resulting in the Hundred Years' War. At times, England enjoyed huge military success, with the economy buoyed by profits from the international wool and cloth trade. However, by 1450, England was in crisis; the country was facing military failure in France as well as an ongoing recession. More social unrest broke out, followed by the Wars of the Roses, fought between rival factions of the English nobility. Henry VII's victory in 1485 over Richard III at the Battle of Bosworth Field conventionally marks the end of the Middle Ages in England and the start of the Early Modern period.

== Political history ==
=== Early Middle Ages (600–1066) ===
At the start of the Middle Ages, England was a part of Britannia, a former province of the Roman Empire. The local economy had once been dominated by imperial Roman spending on a large military establishment, which in turn helped to support a complex network of towns, roads, and villas. At the end of the 4th century, however, Roman forces had been largely withdrawn, and this economy collapsed. Germanic settlers began to arrive in increasing numbers during the 5th and 6th centuries, establishing small farms and settlements, and their language, Old English, swiftly spread as more settlers arrived and those of the previous inhabitants who had not moved west or to Brittany switched from Common Brittonic and British Latin to the migrants' language. New political and social identities emerged, including an Anglian culture in the east of England and a Saxon culture in the south, with local groups establishing regiones, small polities ruled over by powerful families and individuals. By the 7th century, some rulers, including those of Wessex, East Anglia, Essex, and Kent, had begun to term themselves kings, living in villae regales, royal centres, and collecting tribute from the surrounding regiones; these kingdoms are often referred to as the Heptarchy.

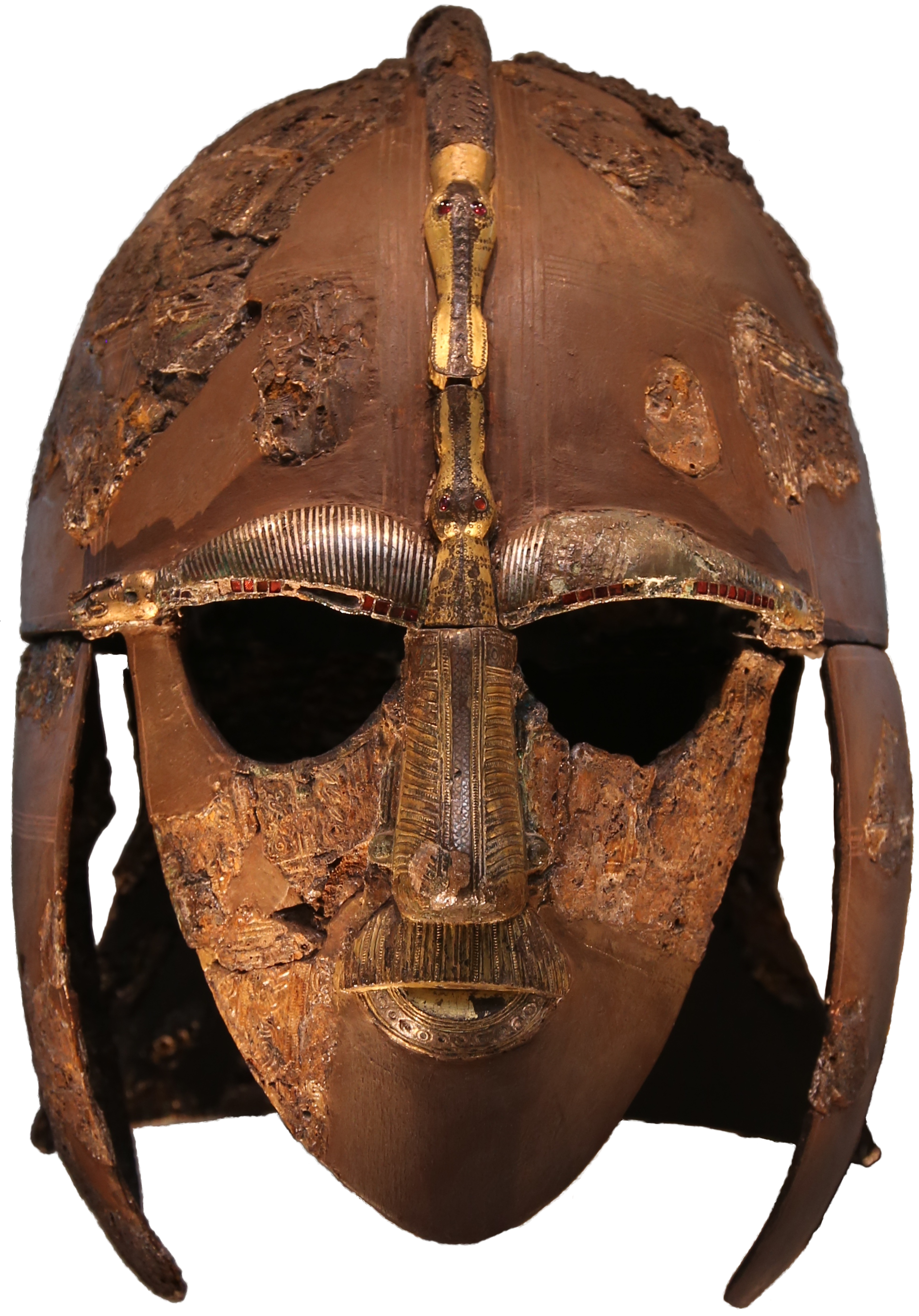
Ceremonial Anglo-Saxon helmet from the Sutton Hoo burial, 7th century

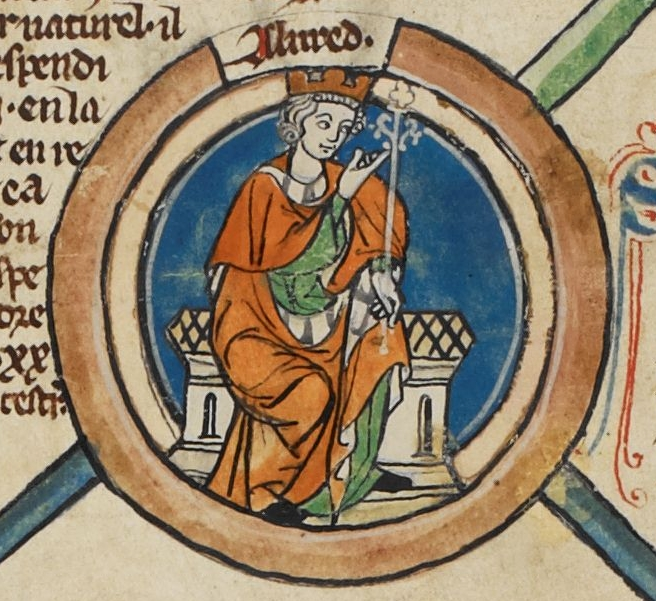
King Alfred the Great of Wessex (847-899) - the king who laid the foundation of the Kingdom of England in the 10th century

In the 7th century, the Kingdom of Mercia rose to prominence under the leadership of King Penda. Mercia invaded neighbouring lands until it loosely controlled around 50 regiones covering much of England. Mercia and the remaining kingdoms, led by their warrior elites, continued to compete for territory throughout the 8th century. Massive earthworks, such as the defensive dyke built by Offa of Mercia, helped to defend key frontiers and towns. In 789, however, the first Scandinavian raids on England began; these Viking attacks grew in number and scale until in 865 the Danish micel here or Great Army, invaded England, captured York and defeated the kingdom of East Anglia. Mercia and Northumbria fell in 875 and 876, and Alfred of Wessex was driven into internal exile in 878.

However, in the same year Alfred won a decisive victory against the Danes at the Battle of Edington, and he exploited the fear of the Viking threat to raise large numbers of men and using a network of defended towns called burhs to defend his territory and mobilise royal resources. Suppressing internal opposition to his rule, Alfred contained the invaders within a region known as the Danelaw. Under his son, Edward the Elder, and his grandson, Æthelstan, Wessex expanded further north into Mercia and the Danelaw, and by the 950s and the reigns of Eadred and Edgar, York was finally permanently retaken from the Vikings. The West Saxon rulers were now kings of the Angelcynn, that is of the whole English folk.

With the death of Edgar, however, the royal succession became problematic. Æthelred took power in 978 following the murder of his brother Edward, but England was then invaded by Sweyn Forkbeard, the son of a Danish king. Attempts to bribe Sweyn not to attack using danegeld payments failed, and he took the throne in 1013. Swein's son, Cnut, liquidated many of the older English families following his seizure of power in 1016. Æthelred's son, Edward the Confessor, had survived in exile in Normandy and returned to claim the throne in 1042. Edward was childless, and the succession again became a concern. England became dominated by the Godwin family, who had taken advantage of the Danish killings to acquire huge wealth. When Edward died in 1066, Harold Godwinson claimed the throne, defeating his rival Norwegian claimant, Harald Hardrada, at the battle of Stamford Bridge.

=== High Middle Ages (1066–1272) ===
In 1066, William, Duke of Normandy, took advantage of the English succession crisis to begin the Norman Conquest. With an army of Norman followers and mercenaries, he defeated Harold at the Battle of Hastings on 14 October 1066 and rapidly occupied the south of England. William used a network of castles to control the major centres of power, granting extensive lands to his main Norman followers and co-opting or eliminating the former Anglo-Saxon elite. Major revolts followed, which William suppressed before intervening in the north-east of England, establishing Norman control of York and devastating the region. Some Norman lords used England as a launching point for attacks into South and North Wales, spreading up the valleys to create new Marcher territories. By the time of William's death in 1087, England formed the largest part of an Anglo-Norman empire, ruled over by a network of nobles with landholdings across England, Normandy, and Wales. England's growing wealth was critical in allowing the Norman kings to project power across the region, including funding campaigns along the frontiers of Normandy.

Norman rule, however, proved unstable; successions to the throne were contested, leading to violent conflicts between the claimants and their noble supporters. William II inherited the throne but faced revolts attempting to replace him with his older brother Robert or his cousin Stephen of Aumale. In 1100, William II died while hunting. Despite Robert's rival claims, his younger brother Henry I immediately seized power. War broke out, ending in Robert's defeat at Tinchebrai and his subsequent life imprisonment. Robert's son Clito remained free, however, and formed the focus for fresh revolts until his death in 1128. Henry's only legitimate son, William, died aboard the White Ship disaster of 1120, sparking a fresh succession crisis: Henry's nephew, Stephen of Blois, claimed the throne in 1135, but this was disputed by the Empress Matilda, Henry's daughter. (Note: At the time of the succession crisis, Matilda was married to Count Geoffrey of Anjou, but she still used the title of Empress from her first marriage to Henry V, the Holy Roman Emperor.) Civil war broke out across England and Normandy, resulting in a long period of warfare later termed the Anarchy. Matilda's son, Henry, finally agreed to a peace settlement at Winchester and succeeded as king in 1154.

Henry II was the first of the Angevin rulers of England, so-called because he was also the Count of Anjou in Northern France. Henry had also acquired the huge duchy of Aquitaine by marriage, and England became a key part of a loose-knit assemblage of lands spread across Western Europe, later termed the Angevin Empire. Henry reasserted royal authority and rebuilt the royal finances, intervening to claim power in Ireland and promoting the Anglo-Norman colonisation of the country. Henry strengthened England's borders with Wales and Scotland, and used the country's wealth to fund a long-running war with his rivals in France, but arrangements for his succession once again proved problematic. Several revolts broke out, led by Henry's children who were eager to acquire power and lands, sometimes backed by France, Scotland and the Welsh princes. After a final confrontation with Henry, his son Richard I succeeded to the throne in 1189.

Richard spent his reign focused on protecting his possessions in France and fighting in the Third Crusade; his brother, John, inherited England in 1199 but lost Normandy and most of Aquitaine after several years of war with France. John fought successive, increasingly expensive, campaigns in a bid to regain these possessions. John's efforts to raise revenues, combined with his fractious relationships with many of the English barons, led to confrontation in 1215, an attempt to restore peace through the signing of Magna Carta, and finally the outbreak of the First Barons' War. John died having fought the rebel barons and their French backers to a stalemate, and royal power was re-established by barons loyal to the young Henry III. England's power structures remained unstable and the outbreak of the Second Barons' War in 1264 resulted in the king's capture by Simon de Montfort. Henry's son, Edward, defeated the rebel factions between 1265 and 1267, restoring his father to power.

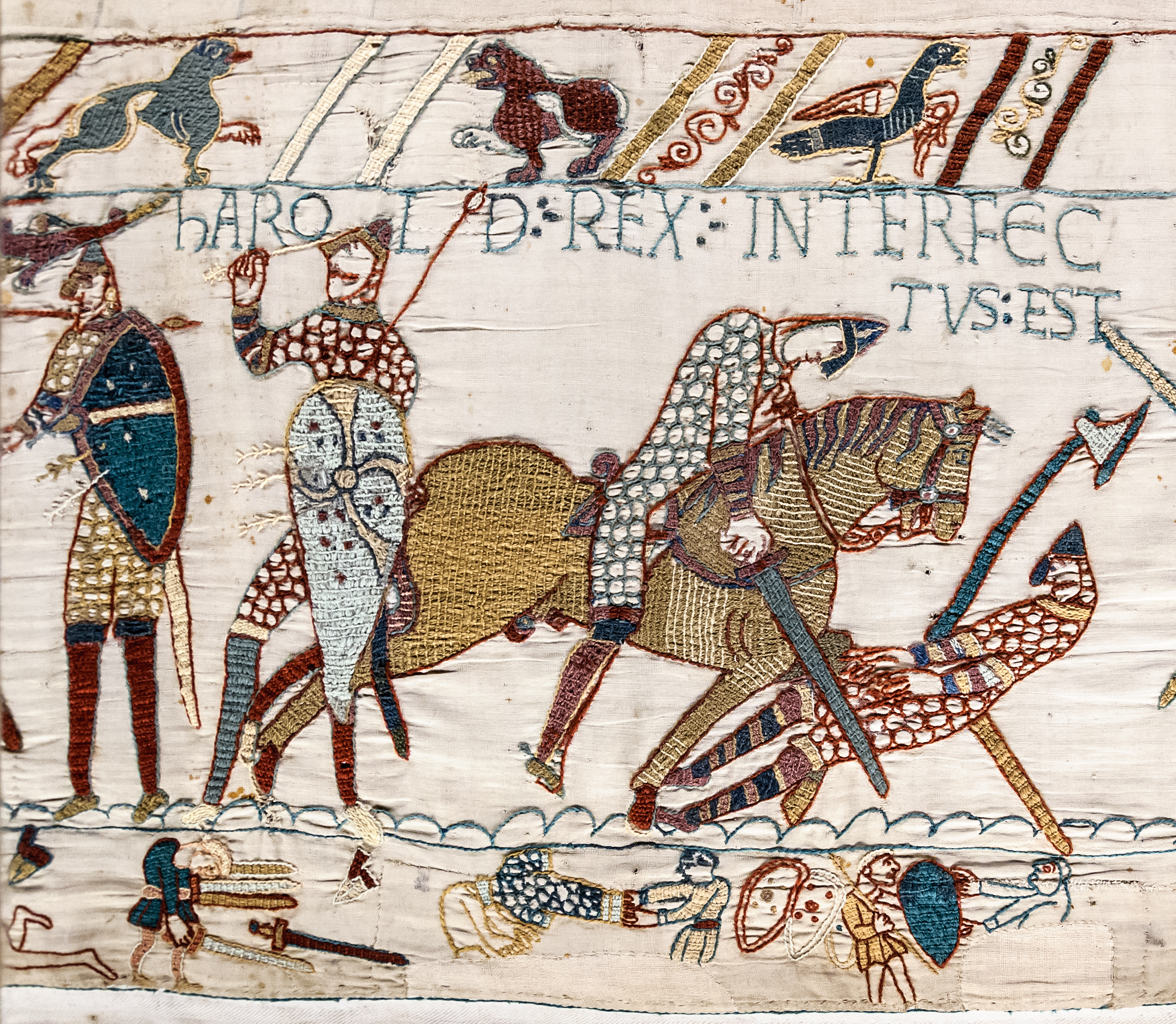
Section of the Bayeux Tapestry showing the final stages of the Battle of Hastings

=== Late Middle Ages (1272–1485) ===
On becoming king, Edward I rebuilt the status of the monarchy, restoring and extending key castles that had fallen into disrepair. Uprisings by the princes of North Wales led to Edward mobilising a huge army, defeating the native Welsh and undertaking a programme of English colonisation and castle building across the region. Further wars were conducted in Flanders and Aquitaine. Edward also fought campaigns in Scotland, but was unable to achieve strategic victory, and the costs created tensions that nearly led to civil war. Edward II inherited the war with Scotland and faced growing opposition to his rule as a result of his royal favourites and military failures. The Despenser War of 1321–22 was followed by instability and the subsequent overthrow, and possible murder, of Edward in 1327 at the hands of his French wife, Isabella, and a rebel baron, Roger Mortimer. (Note: Academics have discussed the fate of Edward II at length. The majority opinion is that Edward died in 1327 at Berkeley Castle, possibly murdered; a minority opinion holds that Edward was either released or escaped, and lived on elsewhere in Europe for many years.) Isabella and Mortimer's regime lasted only a few years before falling to a coup, led by Isabella's son Edward III, in 1330.

Like his grandfather, Edward III took steps to restore royal power, but during the 1340s the Black Death arrived in England. The losses from the epidemic, and the recurring plagues that followed it, significantly affected events in England for many years to come. Meanwhile, Edward, under pressure from France in Aquitaine, made a challenge for the French throne. Over the next century, English forces fought many campaigns in a long-running conflict that became known as the Hundred Years' War. Despite the challenges involved in raising the revenues to pay for the war, Edward's military successes brought an influx of plundered wealth to many parts of England and enabled substantial building work by the king. Many members of the English elite, including Edward's son the Black Prince, were heavily involved in campaigning in France and administering the new continental territories.

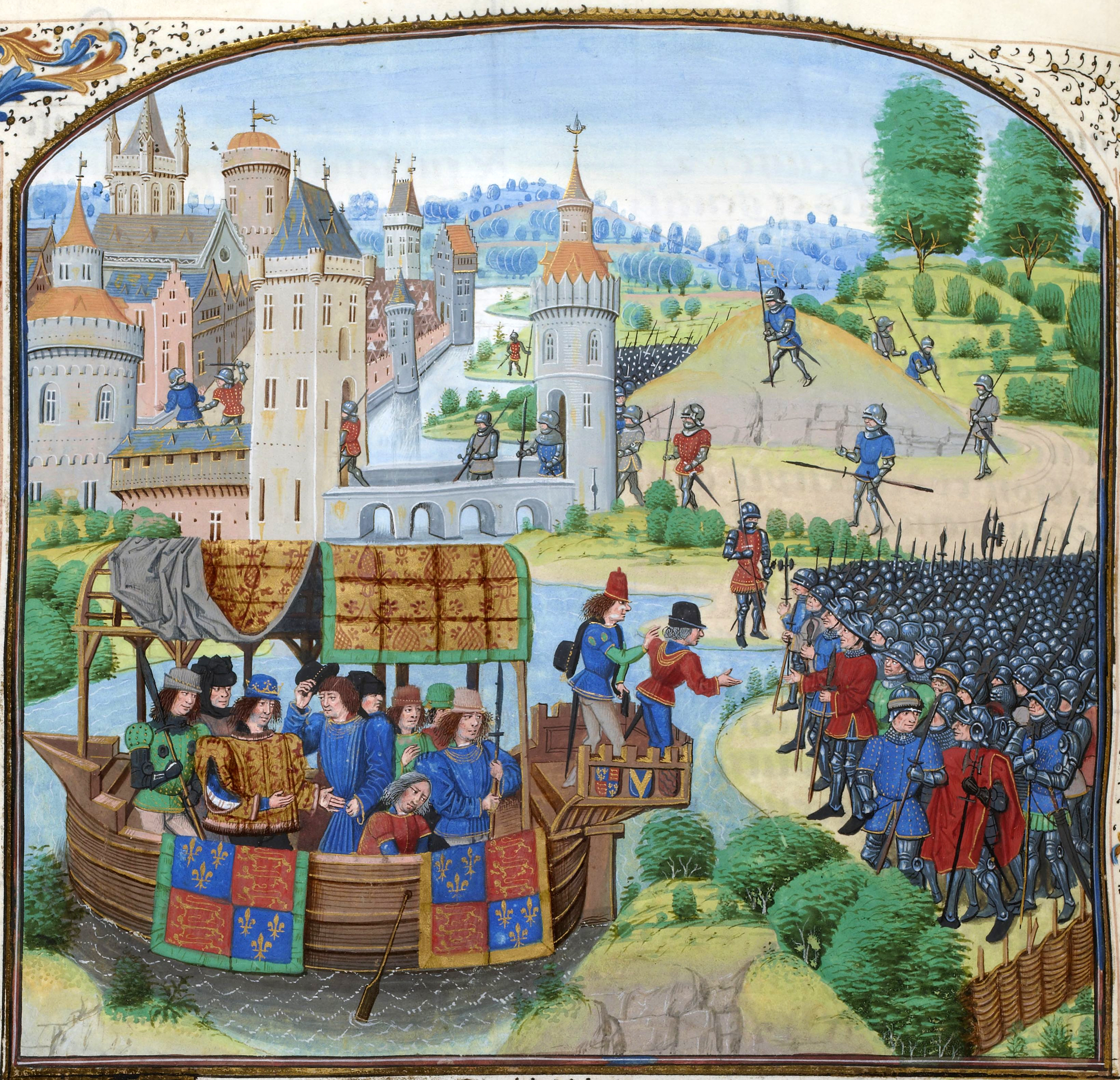
Richard II meets the rebels calling for economic and political reform during the Peasants' Revolt of 1381

Edward's grandson, the young Richard II, faced political and economic problems, many resulting from the Black Death, including the Peasants' Revolt that broke out across the south of England in 1381. Over the coming decades, Richard and groups of nobles vied for power and control of policy towards France until Henry of Bolingbroke seized the throne with the support of parliament in 1399. Ruling as Henry IV, he exercised power through a royal council and parliament, while attempting to enforce political and religious conformity. His son, Henry V, reinvigorated the war with France and came close to achieving strategic success shortly before his death in 1422. Henry VI became king at the age of only nine months and both the English political system and the military situation in France began to unravel.

A sequence of bloody civil wars, later termed the Wars of the Roses, finally broke out in 1455; these wars were spurred on by an economic crisis and a widespread perception of poor government. Edward IV, leading a faction known as the Yorkists, removed Henry from power in 1461 but by 1469 fighting recommenced as Edward, Henry, and Edward's brother George, backed by leading nobles and powerful French supporters, vied for power. By 1471 Edward was triumphant and most of his rivals were dead. On his death, power passed to his brother Richard of Gloucester, who initially ruled on behalf of the young Edward V before seizing the throne himself as Richard III. The future Henry VII, aided by French and Scottish troops, returned to England and defeated Richard at the battle of Bosworth in 1485, bringing an end to the majority of the fighting, although lesser rebellions against his Tudor dynasty would continue for several years afterwards.

== Government and society ==
=== Governance and social structures ===
==== Early Middle Ages (600–1066) ====
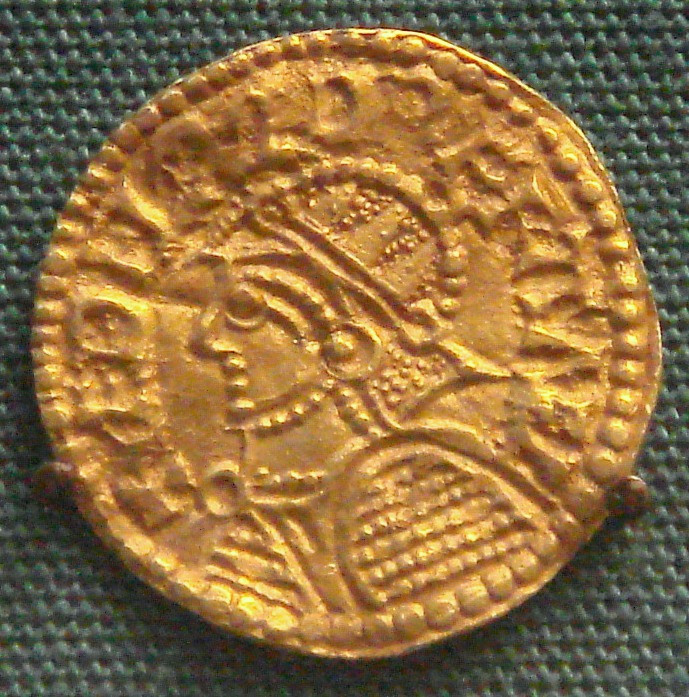
An Anglo-Saxon mancus, showing the face of Æthelred the Unready

The Anglo-Saxon kingdoms were hierarchical societies, each based on ties of allegiance between powerful lords and their immediate followers. At the top of the social structure was the king, who stood above many of the normal processes of Anglo-Saxon life and whose household had special privileges and protection. Beneath the king were thegns, nobles, the more powerful of which maintained their own courts and were termed ealdormen. The relationship between kings and their nobles was bound up with military symbolism and the ritual exchange of weapons and armour. Freemen, called churls, formed the next level of society, often holding land in their own right or controlling businesses in the towns. Geburs, peasants who worked land belonging to a thegn, formed a lower class still. The very lowest class were slaves, who could be bought and sold and who held only minimal rights.

The balance of power between these different groups changed over time. Early in the period, kings were elected by members of the late king's council, but primogeniture rapidly became the norm for succession. The kings further bolstered their status by adopting Christian ceremonies and nomenclature, introducing ecclesiastical coronations during the 8th century and terming themselves "Christ's deputy" by the 11th century. Huge estates were initially built up by the king, bishops, monasteries and thegns, but in the 9th and 10th centuries these were slowly broken up as a consequence of inheritance arrangements, marriage settlements and church purchases. In the 11th century, the royal position worsened further, as the ealdormen rapidly built up huge new estates, making them collectively much more powerful than the king—this contributed to the political instability of the final Anglo-Saxon years. As time went by, the position of the churls deteriorated, as their rights were slowly eroded and their duties to their lords increased.

The kingdom of Wessex, which eventually laid claim to England as a whole, evolved a centralised royal administration. One part of this was the king's council, the witenagemot, comprising the senior clergy, ealdormen, and some of the more important thegns; the council met to advise the king on policy and legal issues. The royal household included officials, thegns and a secretariat of clergy which travelled with the king, conducting the affairs of government as it went. Under the Danish kings, a bodyguard of housecarls also accompanied the court. At a regional level, ealdormen played an important part in government, defence and taxation, and the post of sheriff emerged in the 10th century, administering local shires on behalf of an ealdorman. Anglo-Saxon mints were tightly controlled by the kings, providing a high-quality currency, and the whole country was taxed using a system called hidage.

The Anglo-Saxon kings built up a set of written laws, issued either as statutes or codes, but these laws were never written down in their entirety and were always supplemented by an extensive oral tradition of customary law. In the early part of the period local assemblies called moots were gathered to apply the laws to particular cases; in the 10th century these were replaced by hundred courts, serving local areas, and shire moots dealing with larger regions of the kingdom. Many churchmen and thegns were also given permission by the king to hold their own local courts. The legal system depended on a system of oaths in which the value of different individuals swearing on behalf of the plaintiff or defendant varied according to their social status – the word of a companion of the king, for example, was worth twelve times that of a churl. If fines were imposed, their size similarly varied accord to the oath-value of the individual. The Anglo-Saxon authorities struggled to deal with the bloodfeuds between families that emerged following violent killings, attempting to use a system of weregild, a payment of blood money, as a way of providing an alternative to long-running vendettas.

==== High Middle Ages (1066–1272) ====
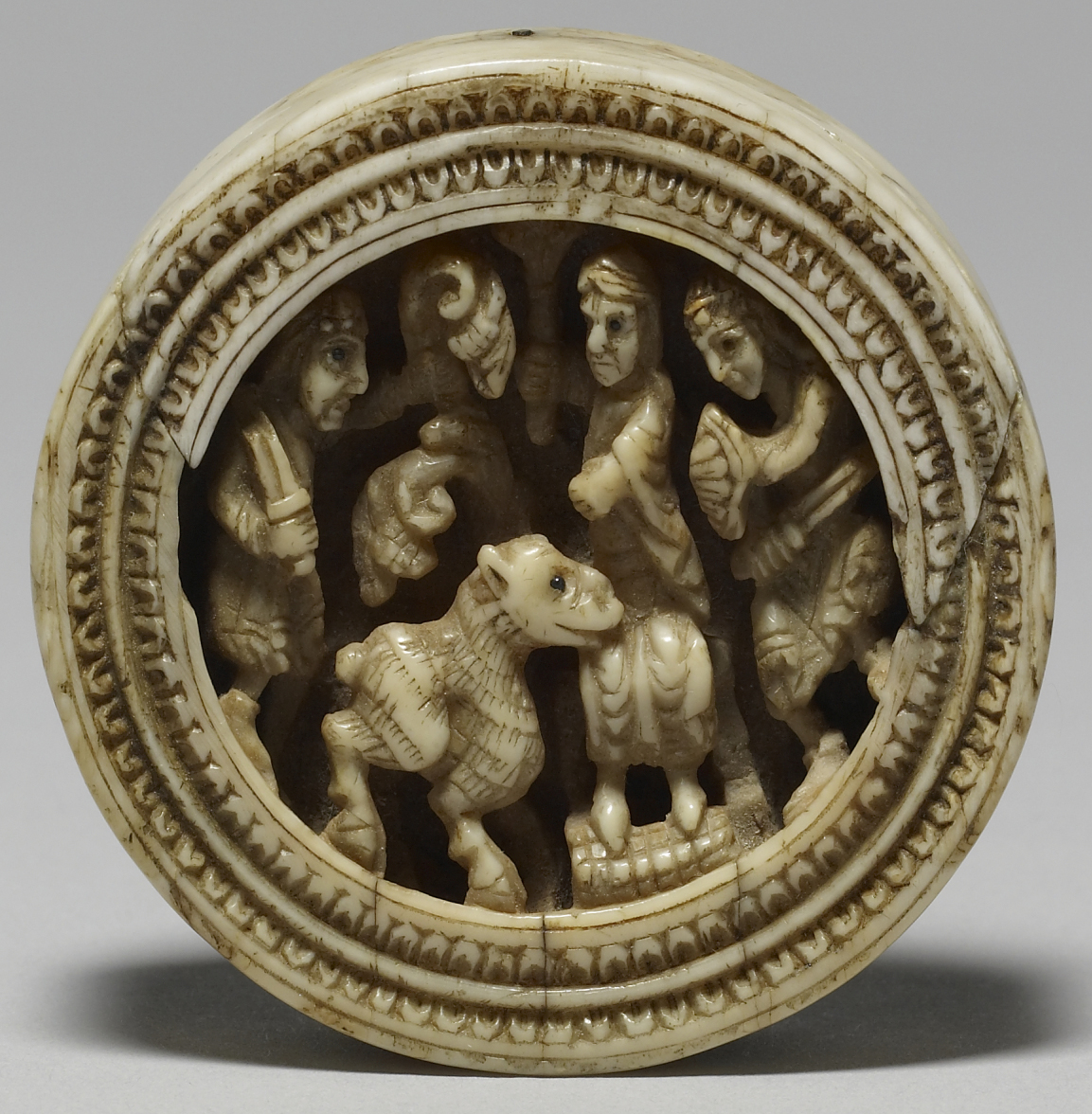
Anglo-Norman 12th-century gaming piece, illustrating soldiers presenting a sheep to a figure seated on a throne. Walters Art Museum, Baltimore.

Within twenty years of the Norman conquest, the former Anglo-Saxon elite were replaced by a new class of Norman nobility, with around 8,000 Normans and French settling in England. The new earls (successors to the ealdermen), sheriffs and church seniors were all drawn from their ranks. In many areas of society there was continuity, as the Normans adopted many of the Anglo-Saxon governmental institutions, including the tax system, mints and the centralisation of law-making and some judicial matters; initially sheriffs and the hundred courts continued to function as before. The existing tax liabilities were captured in the Domesday Book, produced in 1086.

Changes in other areas soon began to be felt. The method of government after the conquest can be described as a feudal system, in that the new nobles held their lands on behalf of the king; in return for promising to provide military support and taking an oath of allegiance, called homage, they were granted lands termed a fief or an honour. (Note: The term feudalism is controversial in current academic debate on the medieval period; depending on the definition used, feudalism may have pre-dated the Conquest instead of being imported by the Normans, and some academics consider the term unreliable altogether.) Major nobles in turn granted lands to smaller landowners in return for homage and further military support, and eventually the peasantry held land in return for local labour services, creating a web of loyalties and resources enforced in part by new honorial courts. This system had been used in Normandy and concentrated more power in the king and the upper elite than the former Anglo-Saxon system of government. The practice of slavery declined in the years after the conquest, as the Normans considered the practice backward and contrary to the teachings of the church. The more prosperous peasants, however, lost influence and power as the Normans made holding land more dependent on providing labour services to the local lord. They sank down the economic hierarchy, swelling the numbers of unfree villeins or serfs, forbidden to leave their manor or seek alternative employment.

At the centre of power, the kings employed a succession of clergy as chancellors, responsible for running the royal chancery, while the familia regis, the military household, emerged to act as a bodyguard and military staff. England's bishops continued to form an important part in local administration, alongside the nobility. Henry I and Henry II both implemented significant legal reforms, extending and widening the scope of centralised, royal law; by the 1180s, the basis for the future English common law had largely been established, with a standing law court in Westminster—an early Common Bench—and travelling judges conducting eyres around the country. King John extended the royal role in delivering justice, and the extent of appropriate royal intervention was one of the issues addressed in the Magna Carta of 1215. The emerging legal system reinvigorated the institution of serfdom in the 13th century by drawing an increasingly sharp distinction between freemen and villeins.

Many tensions existed within the system of government. Royal landownings and wealth stretched across England, and placed the king in a privileged position above even the most powerful of the noble elite. Successive kings, though, still needed more resources to pay for military campaigns, conduct building programmes or to reward their followers, and this meant exercising their feudal rights to interfere in the land-holdings of nobles. This was contentious and a frequent issue of complaint, as there was a growing belief that land should be held by hereditary right, not through the favour of the king. Property and wealth became increasingly focused in the hands of a subset of the nobility, the great magnates, at the expense of the wider baronage, encouraging the breakdown of some aspects of local feudalism. As time went by, the Norman nobility intermarried with many of the great Anglo-Saxon families, and the links with the Duchy began to weaken. By the late 12th century, mobilising the English barons to fight on the continent was proving difficult, and John's attempts to do so ended in civil war. Civil strife re-emerged under Henry III, with the rebel barons in 1258–59 demanding widespread reforms, and an early version of Parliament was summoned in 1265 to represent the rebel interests.

==== Late Middle Ages (1272–1485) ====
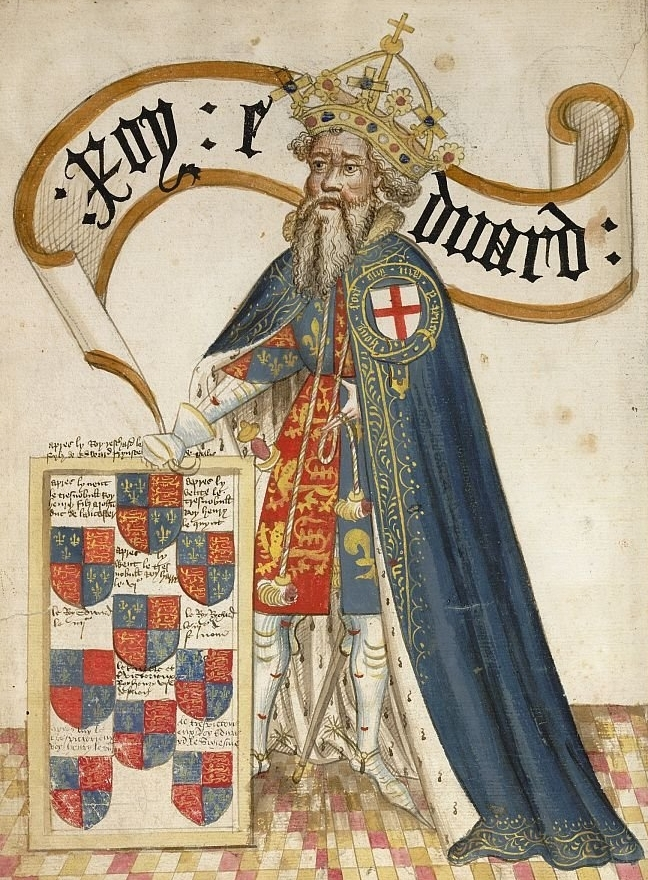
Early 15th-century depiction of Edward III, shown wearing the chivalric symbols of the Order of the Garter

On becoming king in 1272, Edward I reestablished royal power, overhauling the royal finances and appealing to the broader English elite by using Parliament to authorise the raising of new taxes and to hear petitions concerning abuses of local governance. This political balance collapsed under Edward II and savage civil wars broke out during the 1320s. Edward III restored order once more with the help of a majority of the nobility, exercising power through the exchequer, the common bench and the royal household. This government was better organised and on a larger scale than ever before, and by the 14th century the king's formerly peripatetic chancery had to take up permanent residence in Westminster. Edward used Parliament even more than his predecessors to handle general administration, to legislate and to raise the necessary taxes to pay for the wars in France. The royal lands—and incomes from them—had diminished over the years, and increasingly frequent taxation was required to support royal initiatives. Edward held elaborate chivalric events in an effort to unite his supporters around the symbols of knighthood. The ideal of chivalry continued to develop throughout the 14th century, reflected in the growth of knightly orders (including the Order of the Garter), grand tournaments and round table events.

Society and government in England in the early 14th century were challenged by the Great Famine and the Black Death. The economic and demographic crisis created a sudden surplus of land, undermining the ability of landowners to exert their feudal rights and causing a collapse in incomes from rented lands. Wages soared, as employers competed for a scarce workforce. Statute of Labourers 1351 was introduced to limit wages and to prevent the consumption of luxury goods by the lower classes, with prosecutions coming to take up most of the legal system's energy and time. A poll tax was introduced in 1377 that spread the costs of the war in France more widely across the whole population. The tensions spilled over into violence in the summer of 1381 in the form of the Peasants' Revolt; a violent retribution followed, with as many as 7,000 alleged rebels executed. A new class of gentry emerged as a result of these changes, renting land from the major nobility to farm out at a profit. The legal system continued to expand during the 14th century, dealing with an ever-wider set of complex problems.

By the time that Richard II was deposed in 1399, the power of the major noble magnates had grown considerably; powerful rulers such as Henry IV would contain them, but during the minority of Henry VI they controlled the country. The magnates depended upon their income from rent and trade to allow them to maintain groups of paid, armed retainers, often sporting controversial livery, and buy support amongst the wider gentry; this system has been dubbed bastard feudalism. (Note: The utility of the term bastard feudalism has been extensively discussed by historians, with many different conclusions being drawn.) Their influence was exerted both through the House of Lords at Parliament and through the king's council. The gentry and wealthier townsmen exercised increasing influence through the House of Commons, opposing raising taxes to pay for the French wars. By the 1430s and 1440s the English government was in major financial difficulties, leading to the crisis of 1450 and a popular revolt under the leadership of Jack Cade. Law and order deteriorated, and the crown was unable to intervene in the factional fighting between different nobles and their followers. The resulting Wars of the Roses saw a savage escalation of violence between the noble leaderships of both sides: captured enemies were executed and family lands attainted. By the time that Henry VII took the throne in 1485, England's governmental and social structures had been substantially weakened, with whole noble lines extinguished.

=== Women in society ===
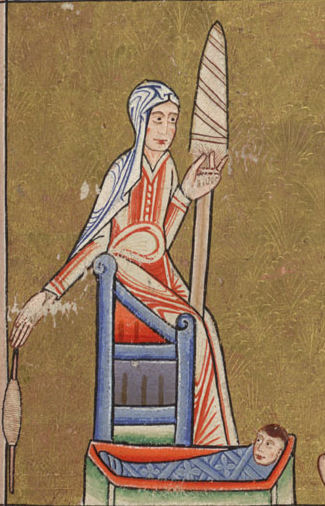
A depiction of an English woman c. 1170 using a spindle and distaff, while caring for a young child

Medieval England was a patriarchal society and the lives of women were heavily influenced by contemporary beliefs about gender and authority. However, the position of women varied considerably according to various factors, including their social class; whether they were unmarried, married, widowed or remarried; and in which part of the country they lived. Significant gender inequalities persisted throughout the period, as women typically had more limited life-choices, access to employment and trade, and legal rights than men.

In Anglo-Saxon society, noblewomen enjoyed considerable rights and status, although the society was still firmly patriarchal. Some exercised power as abbesses, exerting widespread influence across the early English Church, although their wealth and authority diminished with the monastic reforms of the 9th century. Anglo-Saxon queens began to hold lands in their own right in the 10th century and their households contributed to the running of the kingdom. Although women could not lead military forces, in the absence of their husbands some noblewomen led the defence of manors and towns. Most Anglo-Saxon women, however, worked on the land as part of the agricultural community, or as brewers or bakers.

After the Norman invasion, the position of women in society changed. The rights and roles of women became more sharply defined, in part as a result of the development of the feudal system and the expansion of the English legal system; some women benefited from this, while others lost out. The rights of widows were formally laid down in law by the end of the 12th century, clarifying the right of free women to own property, but this did not necessarily prevent women from being forcibly remarried against their wishes. The growth of governmental institutions under a succession of bishops reduced the role of queens and their households in formal government. Married or widowed noblewomen remained significant cultural and religious patrons and played an important part in political and military events, even if chroniclers were uncertain if this was appropriate behaviour. As in earlier centuries, most women worked in agriculture, but here roles became more clearly gendered, with ploughing and managing the fields defined as men's work, for example, and dairy production becoming dominated by women.

The years after the Black Death left many women widows; in the wider economy labour was in short supply and land was suddenly readily available. In rural areas peasant women could enjoy a better standard of living than ever before, but the amount of work being done by women may have increased. Many other women travelled to the towns and cities, to the point where they outnumbered men in some settlements. There they worked with their husbands, or in a limited number of occupations, including spinning, making clothes, victualling and as servants. Some women became full-time ale brewers, until they were pushed out of business by the male-dominated beer industry in the 15th century. Higher status jobs and apprenticeships, however, remained closed to women. As in earlier times, noblewomen exercised power on their estates in their husbands' absence and again, if necessary, defended them in sieges and skirmishes. Wealthy widows who could successfully claim their rightful share of their late husband's property could live as powerful members of the community in their own right.

=== Identity ===
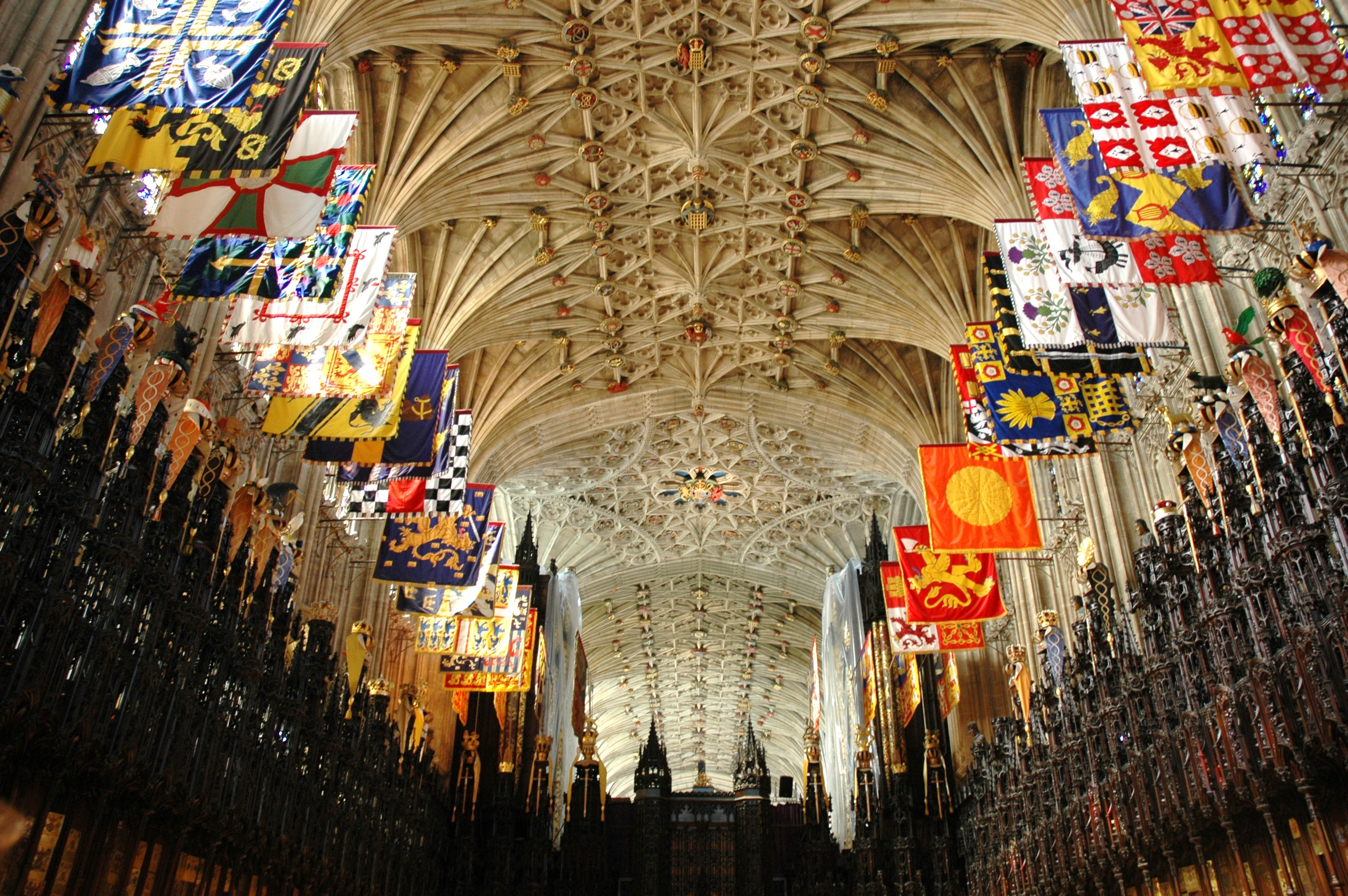
The English Gothic vaulted ceiling of St George's Chapel, Windsor Castle

An English cultural identity first emerged from the interaction of the Germanic immigrants of the 5th and 6th centuries and the indigenous Romano-British inhabitants. Although early medieval chroniclers described the immigrants as Angles and Saxons, they came from a much wider area across Northern Europe, and represented a range of different ethnic groups. Over the 6th century, however, these different groups began to coalesce into stratified societies across England, roughly corresponding to the later Angle and Saxon kingdoms recorded by Bede in the 8th century. By the 9th century, the term the Angelcynn was being officially used to refer to a single English people, and promoted for propaganda purposes by chroniclers and kings to inspire resistance to the Danish invasions.

The Normans and French who arrived after the conquest saw themselves as different from the English. They had close family and economic links to the Duchy of Normandy, spoke Norman French and had their own distinctive culture. For many years, to be English was to be associated with military failure and serfdom. During the 12th century, the divisions between the English and Normans began to dissolve as a result of intermarriage and cohabitation. By the end of the 12th century, and possibly as early as the 1150, contemporary commentators believed the two peoples to be blending, and the loss of the Duchy in 1204 reinforced this trend. The resulting society still prized wider French cultural values, however, and French remained the language of the court, business and international affairs, even if Parisians mocked the English for their poor pronunciation. By the 14th century, however, French was increasingly having to be formally taught, rather than being learnt naturally in the home, although the aristocracy would typically spend many years of their lives in France and remained entirely comfortable working in French.

During the 12th and 13th centuries, the English began to consider themselves superior to the Welsh, Scots and Bretons. The English perceived themselves as civilised, economically prosperous and properly Christian, while the Celtic fringe was considered lazy, barbarous and backward. Following the invasion of Ireland in the late 12th century, similar feelings were expressed about the Irish, with the distinctions clarified and reinforced in 14th-century English legislation. The English also felt strongly about the foreign traders who lived in the special enclaves in London in the Late Middle Ages; the position of the Jews is described below, but Italian and Baltic traders were also regarded as aliens and were frequently the targets of violence during economic downturns. Even within England, different identities abounded, each with their own sense of status and importance. Regional identities could be important – men and women from Yorkshire, for example, had a clear identity within English society, and professional groups with a distinct identity, such as lawyers, engaged in open fighting with others in cities such as London.

=== Jews ===
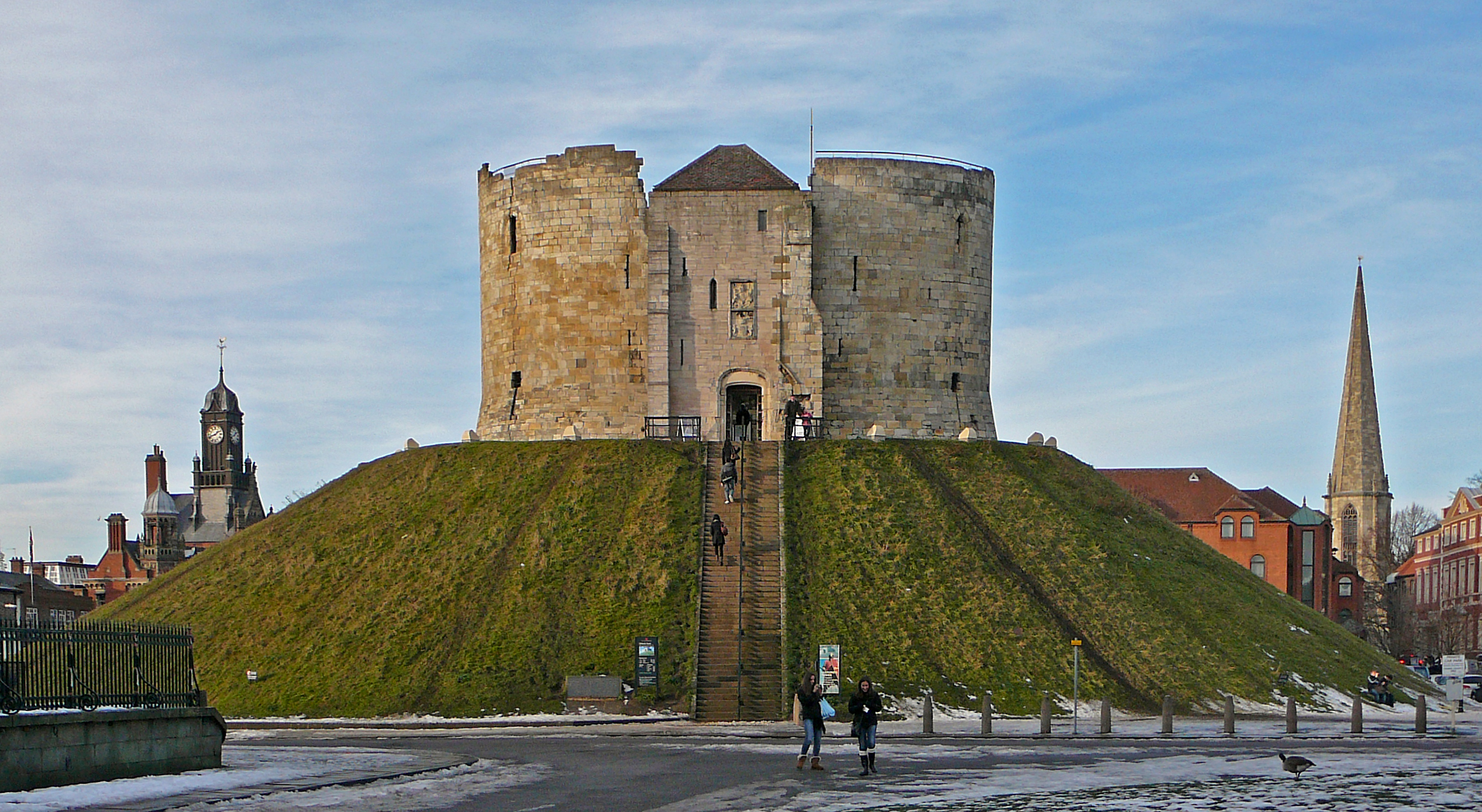
Clifford's Tower in the city of York, the site of an anti-Jewish pogrom in 1190

The Jewish community played an important role in England throughout much of the period. The first Jews arrived in England in the aftermath of the Norman invasion, when William the Conqueror brought over wealthy members of the Rouen community in Normandy to settle in London. The Jewish community expanded out across England and provided essential money-lending and banking services that were otherwise banned by the usury laws. During the 12th century, the Jewish financial community grew richer still, operating under royal protection and providing the king with a source of ready credit. All major towns had Jewish centres, and even the smaller towns saw visits by travelling Jewish merchants. Towards the end of Henry II's reign, however, the king ceased to borrow from the Jewish community and instead turned to extracting money from them through arbitrary taxation and fines. The Jews became vilified and accusations were made that they conducted ritual child murder, encouraging the pogroms carried out against Jewish communities in the reign of Richard I. After an initially peaceful start to John's reign, the king again began to extort money from the Jewish community and, with the breakdown in order in 1215, the Jews were subject to fresh attacks. Henry III restored some protection and Jewish money-lending began to recover. Despite this, the Jewish community became increasingly impoverished and was finally expelled from England in 1290 by Edward I, being replaced by foreign merchants.

== Religion ==
=== Rise of Christianity ===
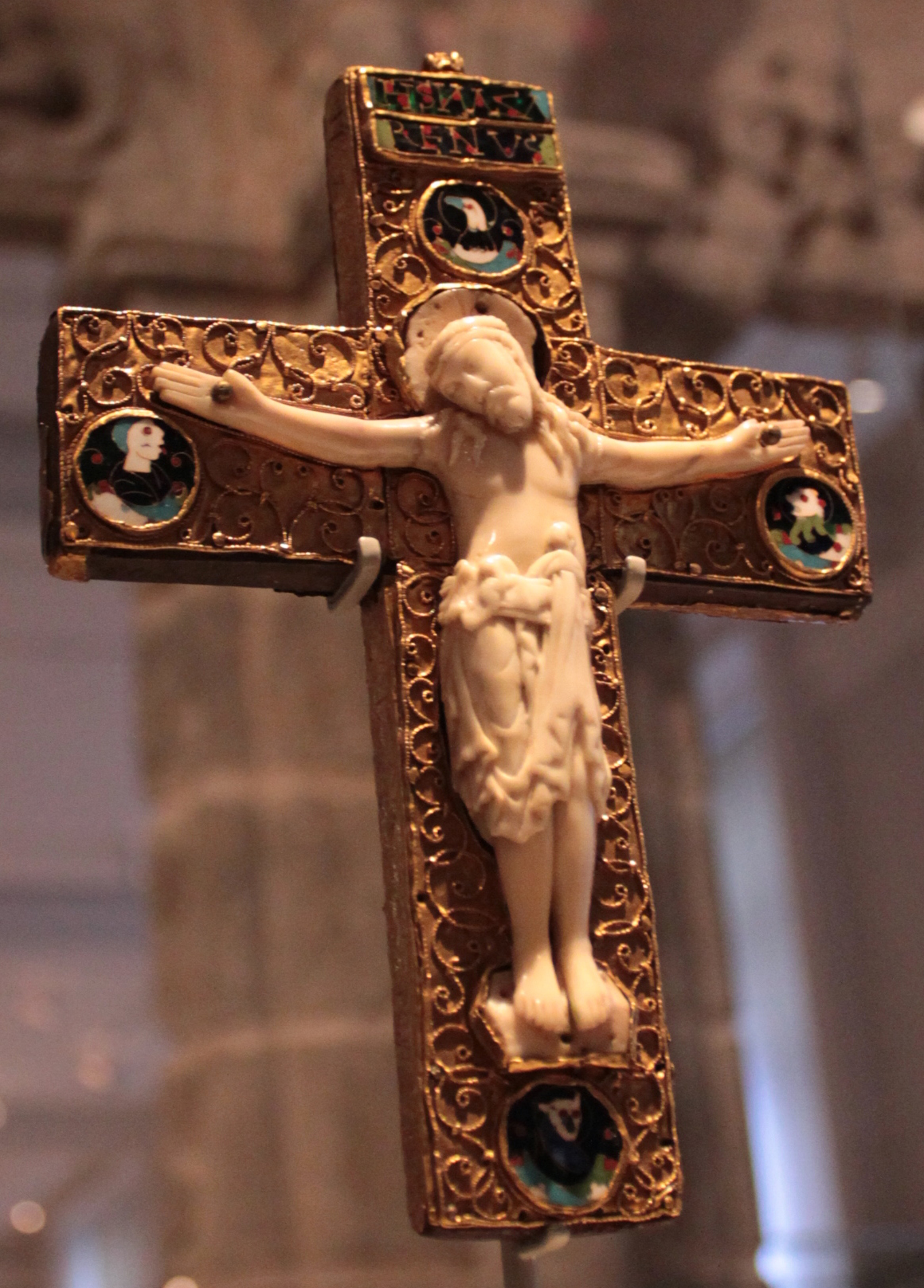
Anglo-Saxon reliquary cross, with English-carved walrus ivory Christ and German gold and cedar cross, c. 1000

Christianity had been the official imperial religion of the Roman Empire, and the first churches were built in England in the second half of the 4th century, overseen by a hierarchy of bishops and priests. Many existing pagan shrines were converted to Christian use and few pagan sites still operated by the 5th century. The collapse of the Roman system in the late 5th century, however, brought about the end of formal Christian religion in the east of England, and the new Germanic immigrants arrived with their own polytheistic gods, including Woden, Thunor and Tiw, still reflected in various English place names. Despite the resurgence of paganism in England, Christian communities still survived in more western areas such as Gloucestershire and Somerset.

The movement towards Christianity began again in the late 6th and 7th centuries, helped by the conversion of the Franks in Northern France, who carried considerable influence in England. Pope Gregory I sent a team of missionaries to convert King Æthelberht of Kent and his household, starting the process of converting Kent. Augustine became the first Archbishop of Canterbury and started to build new churches across the South-East, reusing existing pagan shrines. Oswald and Oswiu, kings of Northumbria, were converted in the 630s and 640s, and the wave of change carried on through the middle of the 7th century across the kingdoms of Mercia, the South Saxons and the Isle of Wight. The process was largely complete by the end of the 7th century, but left a confusing and disparate array of local practices and religious ceremonies. This new Christianity reflected the existing military culture of the Anglo-Saxons: as kings began to convert in the 6th and 7th centuries, conversion began to be used as a justification for war against the remaining pagan kingdoms, for example, while Christian saints were imbued with martial properties.

The Viking invasions of the 8th and 9th centuries reintroduced paganism to North-East England, leading in turn to another wave of conversion. Indigenous Scandinavian beliefs were very similar to other Germanic groups, with a pantheon of gods including Odin, Thor and Ullr, combined with a belief in a final, apocalyptic battle called Ragnarok. The Norse settlers in England were converted relatively quickly, assimilating their beliefs into Christianity in the decades following the occupation of York, which the Archbishop had survived. The process was largely complete by the early 10th century and enabled England's leading Churchmen to negotiate with the warlords. As the Norse in mainland Scandinavia started to convert, many mainland rulers recruited missionaries from England to assist in the process.

=== Religious institutions ===
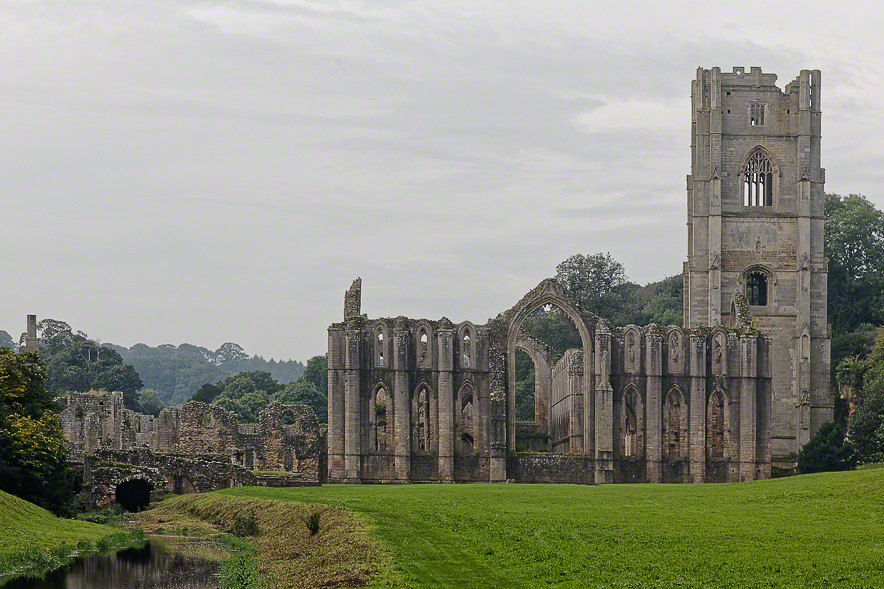
Fountains Abbey, one of the new Cistercian monasteries built in the 12th century

With the conversion of much of England in the 6th and 7th centuries, there was an explosion of local church building. English monasteries formed the main basis for the church, however, and were often sponsored by local rulers, taking various forms, including mixed communities headed by abbesses, bishop-led communities of monks, and others formed around married priests and their families. Cathedrals were constructed, staffed either with secular canons in the European tradition or, uniquely to England, chapters of monks. These institutions were badly affected in the 9th century by Viking raids and predatory annexations by the nobility. By the start of the 10th century, monastic lands, financial resources and the quality of monasteries' religious work had been much diminished. Reforms followed under the kings of Wessex who promoted the Benedictine rule then popular on the Continent. A reformed network of around 40 monastic institutions across the south and east of England, under the protection of the king, helped re-establish royal control over the reconquered Danelaw.

The 1066 Norman conquest brought a new set of Norman and French churchmen to power; some adopted and embraced aspects of the former Anglo-Saxon religious system, while others introduced practices from Normandy. Extensive English lands were granted to monasteries in Normandy, allowing them to create daughter priories and monastic cells across the kingdom. The monasteries were brought firmly into the web of feudal relations, with their holding of land linked to the provision of military support to the crown. The Normans adopted the Anglo-Saxon model of monastic cathedral communities, and within seventy years the majority of English cathedrals were controlled by monks; every English cathedral, however, was rebuilt to some extent by the new rulers. England's bishops remained powerful temporal figures, and in the early 12th-century raised armies against Scottish invaders and built up extensive holdings of castles across the country.

New orders began to be introduced into England. As ties to Normandy waned, the French Cluniac order became fashionable and their houses were introduced in England. The Augustinians spread quickly from the beginning of the 12th century onwards, while later in the century the Cistercians reached England, creating houses with a more austere interpretation of the monastic rules and building the great abbeys of Rievaulx and Fountains. By 1215, there were over 600 monastic communities in England, but new endowments slowed during the 13th century, creating long-term financial problems for many institutions. The Dominican and Franciscan friars arrived in England during the 1220s, establishing 150 friaries by the end of the 13th century; these mendicant orders rapidly became popular, particularly in towns, and heavily influenced local preaching. The religious military orders that became popular across Europe from the 12th century onwards acquired possessions in England, including the Templars, Teutons and Hospitallers.

=== Church, state and heresy ===
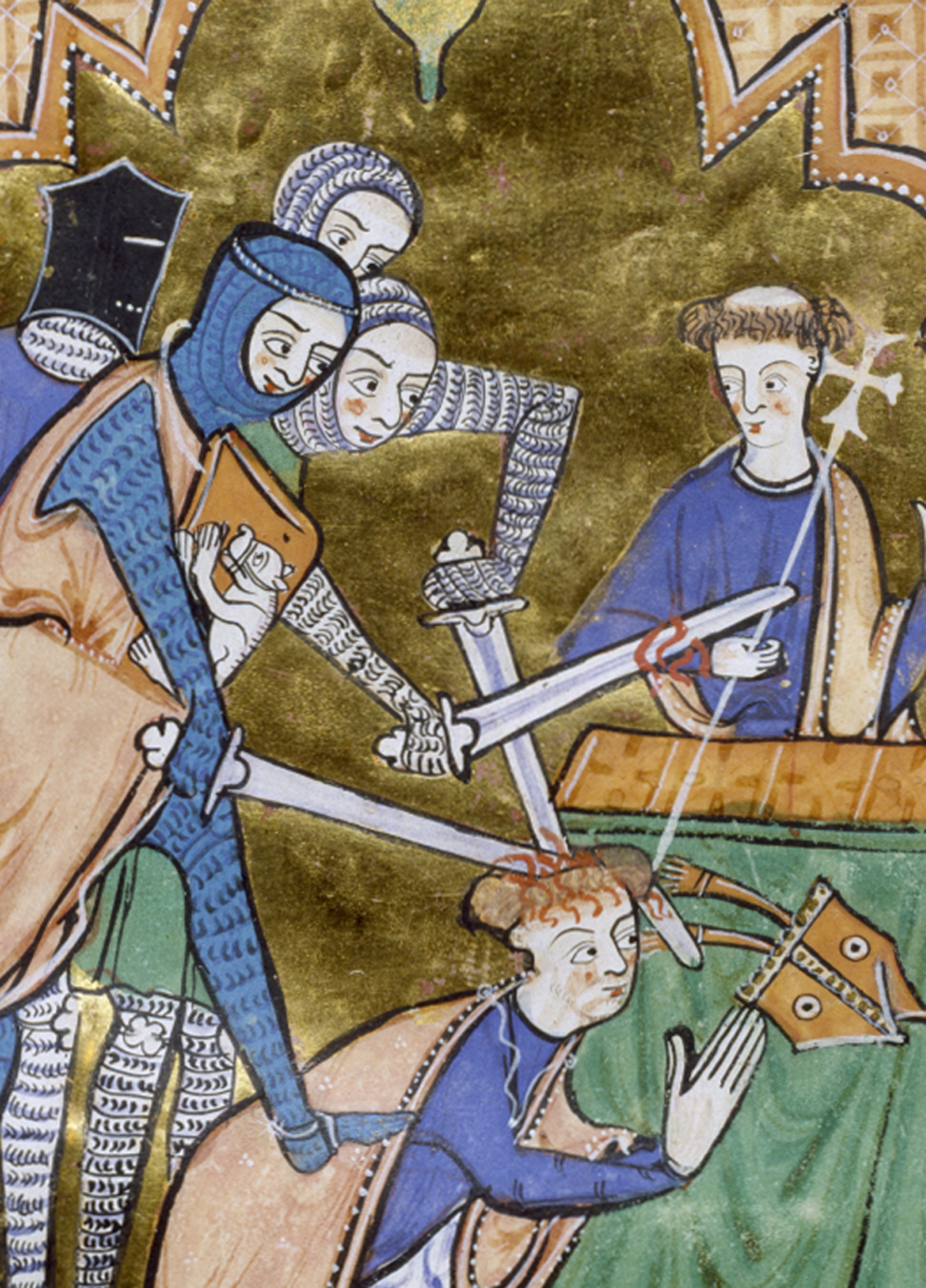
Mid-13th-century depiction of the death of Archbishop Thomas Becket

The Church had a close relationship with the English state throughout the Middle Ages. The bishops and major monastic leaders played an important part in national government, having key roles on the king's council. Bishops often oversaw towns and cities, managing local taxation and government. This frequently became untenable with the Viking incursions of the 9th century, and in locations such as Worcester the local bishops came to new accommodations with the local ealdormen, exchanging some authority and revenue for assistance in defence. The early English church was racked with disagreement on doctrine, which was addressed by the Synod of Whitby in 664; some issues were resolved, but arguments between the archbishops of Canterbury and York as to which had primacy across Britain began shortly afterwards and continued throughout most of the medieval period.

William the Conqueror acquired the support of the Church for the invasion of England by promising ecclesiastical reform. William promoted celibacy amongst the clergy and gave ecclesiastical courts more power, but also reduced the Church's direct links to Rome and made it more accountable to the king. Tensions arose between these practices and the reforming movement of Pope Gregory VII, which advocated greater autonomy from royal authority for the clergy, condemned the practice of simony and promoted greater influence for the papacy in church matters. Despite the bishops continuing to play a major part in royal government, tensions emerged between the kings of England and key leaders within the English Church. Kings and archbishops clashed over rights of appointment and religious policy, and successive archbishops including Anselm, Theobald of Bec, Thomas Becket and Stephen Langton were variously forced into exile, arrested by royal knights or even killed. By the early 13th century, however, the church had largely won its argument for independence, answering almost entirely to Rome.

In the 1380s, several challenges emerged to the traditional teachings of the Church, resulting from the teachings of John Wycliffe, a member of Oxford University. Wycliffe argued that scripture was the best guide to understanding God's intentions, and that the superficial nature of the liturgy, combined with the abuses of wealth within the Church and the role of senior churchmen in government, distracted from that study. A loose movement that included many members of the gentry pursued these ideas after Wycliffe's death in 1384 and attempted to pass a Parliamentary bill in 1395: the movement was rapidly condemned by the authorities and was termed "Lollardy". The English bishops were charged to control and counter this trend, disrupting Lollard preachers and to enforcing the teaching of suitable sermons in local churches. By the early 15th century, combating Lollard teachings had become a key political issue, championed by Henry IV and his Lancastrian followers, who used the powers of both the church and state to combat the heresy.

=== Pilgrimages and Crusades ===
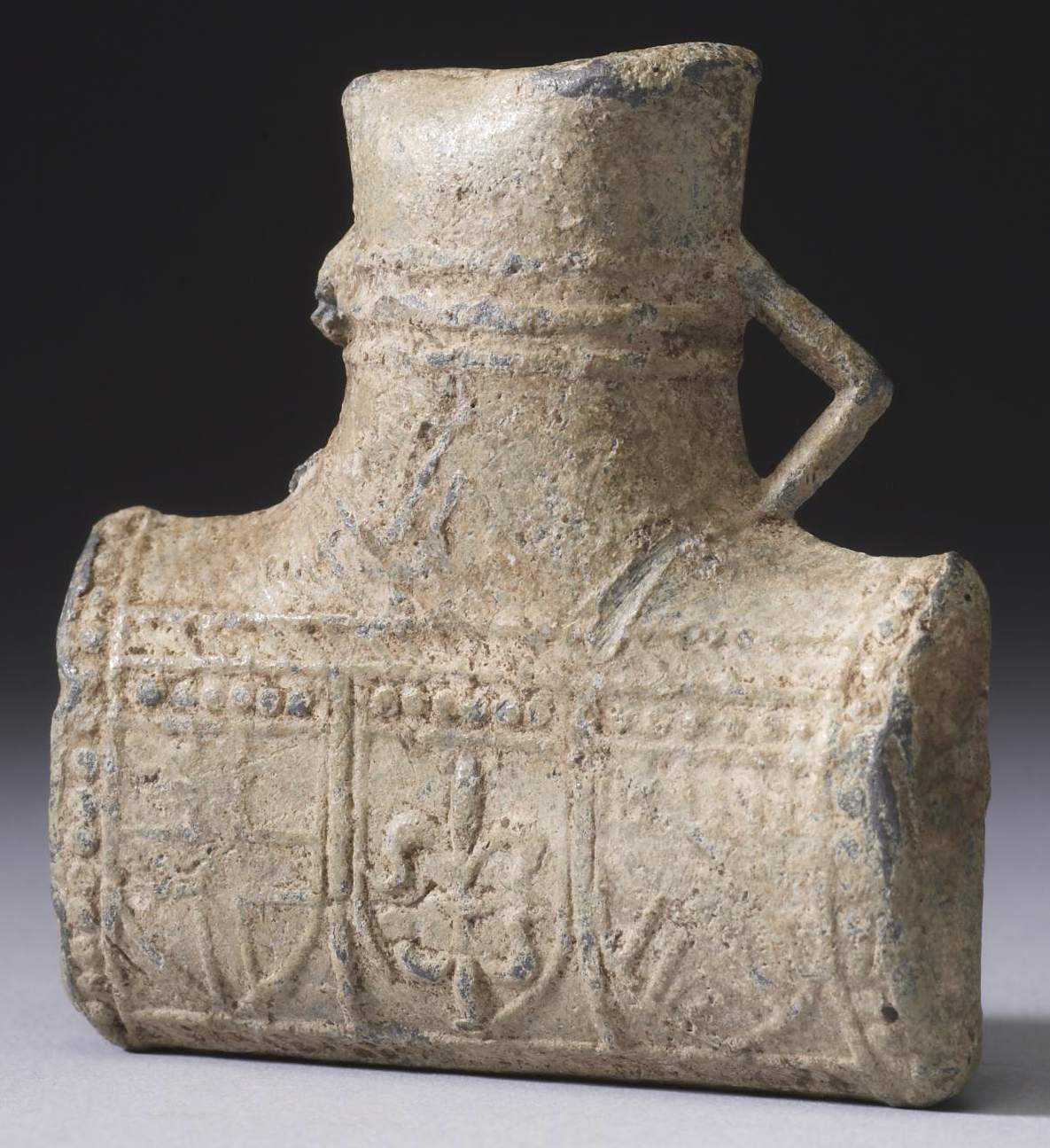
A pilgrim's flask, carried as a protective talisman, containing holy water from the shrine of Thomas Becket in Canterbury Cathedral

Pilgrimages were a popular religious practice throughout the Middle Ages in England, with the tradition dating back to the Roman period. Typically pilgrims would travel short distances to a shrine or a particular church, either to do penance for a perceived sin, or to seek relief from an illness or other condition. Some pilgrims travelled further, either to more distant sites within Britain or, in a few cases, onto the continent.

During the Anglo-Saxon period, many shrines were built on former pagan sites which became popular pilgrimage destinations, while other pilgrims visited prominent monasteries and sites of learning. Senior nobles or kings would travel to Rome, which was a popular destination from the 7th century onwards; sometimes these trips were a form of convenient political exile. Under the Normans, religious institutions with important shrines, such as Glastonbury, Canterbury and Winchester, promoted themselves as pilgrimage destinations, maximising the value of the historic miracles associated with the sites. Accumulating relics became an important task for ambitious institutions, as these were believed to hold curative powers and lent status to the site. Indeed, by the 12th century reports of posthumous miracles by local saints were becoming increasingly common in England, adding to the attractiveness of pilgrimages to prominent relics.

Participation in the Crusades was also seen as a form of pilgrimage, and indeed the same Latin word, peregrinatio, was sometimes applied to both activities. While English participation in the First Crusade between 1095 and 1099 was limited, England played a prominent part in the Second, Third and Fifth Crusades over the next two centuries, with many crusaders leaving for the Levant during the intervening years. The idea of undertaking a pilgrimage to Jerusalem was not new in England, however, as the idea of religiously justified warfare went back to Anglo-Saxon times. Many of those who took up the Cross to go on a Crusade never actually left, often because the individual lacked sufficient funds to undertake the journey. Raising funds to travel typically involved crusaders selling or mortgaging their lands and possessions, which affected their families and, at times, considerably affected the economy as a whole.

== Economy and technology ==
=== Geography ===
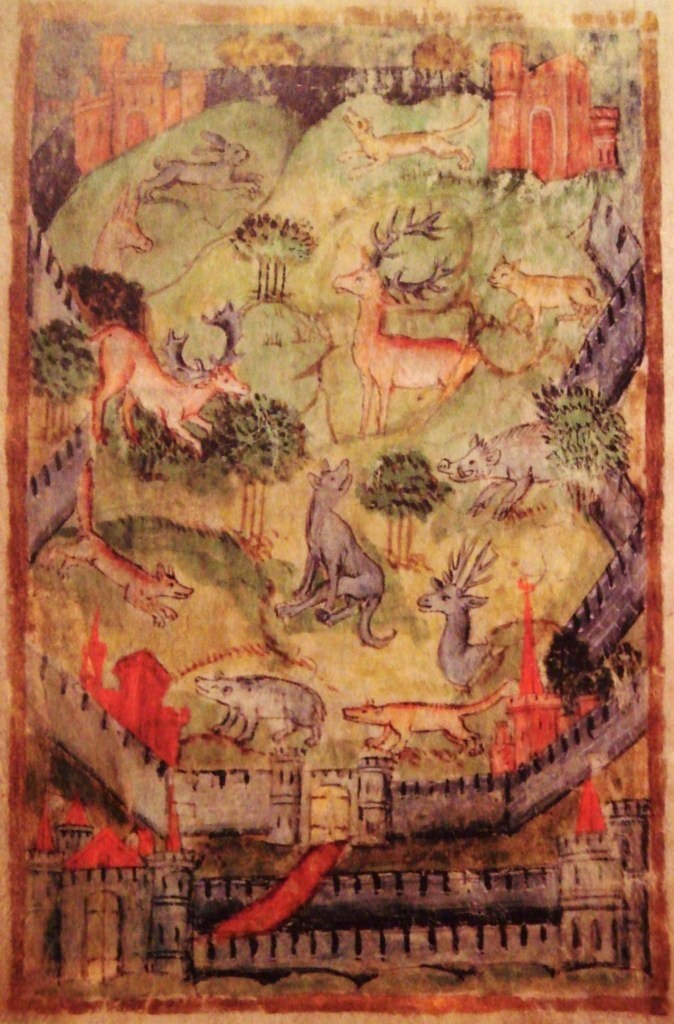
15th-century depiction of an English hunting park

England had a diverse geography in the medieval period, from the Fenlands of East Anglia or the heavily wooded Weald, through to the upland moors of Yorkshire. Despite this, medieval England broadly formed two zones, roughly divided by the rivers Exe and Tees: the south and east of England had lighter, richer soils, able to support both arable and pastoral agriculture, while the poorer soils and colder climate of the north and west produced a predominantly pastoral economy. Slightly more land was covered by trees than in the 20th century, and bears, beavers and wolves lived wild in England, bears being hunted to extinction by the 11th century and beavers by the 12th. Of the 10,000 miles of roads that had been built by the Romans, many remained in use and four were of particular strategic importance—the Icknield Way, the Fosse Way, Ermine Street and Watling Street—which criss-crossed the entire country. The road system was adequate for the needs of the period, although it was significantly cheaper to transport goods by water. The major river networks formed key transport routes, while many English towns formed navigable inland ports.

For much of the Middle Ages, England's climate differed from that in the 21st century. Between the 9th and 13th centuries England went through the Medieval Warm Period, a prolonged period of warmer temperatures; in the early 13th century, for example, summers were around 1 °C warmer than today and the climate was slightly drier. These warmer temperatures allowed poorer land to be brought into cultivation and for grapevines to be cultivated relatively far north. The Warm Period was followed by several centuries of much cooler temperatures, termed the Little Ice Age; by the 14th century spring temperatures had dropped considerably, reaching their coldest in the 1340s and 1350s. This cold end to the Middle Ages significantly affected English agriculture and living conditions.

Even at the start of the Middle Ages the English landscape had been shaped by human occupation over many centuries. Much woodland was new, the result of fields being reclaimed by brush after the collapse of the Roman Empire. Human intervention had established wood pastures, an ancient system for managing woods and animals, and coppicing, a more intensive approach to managing woodlands. Other agricultural lands included arable fields and pastorage, while in some parts of the country, such as the South-West, waste moorland remained testament to earlier over-farming in the Bronze Age. England's environment continued to be shaped throughout the period, through the building of dykes to drain marshes, tree clearance and the large-scale extraction of peat. Managed parks for hunting game, including deer and boars, were built as status symbols by the nobility from the 12th century onwards, but earlier versions of parks, such as hays, may have originated as early as the 7th century.

=== Economy and demographics ===
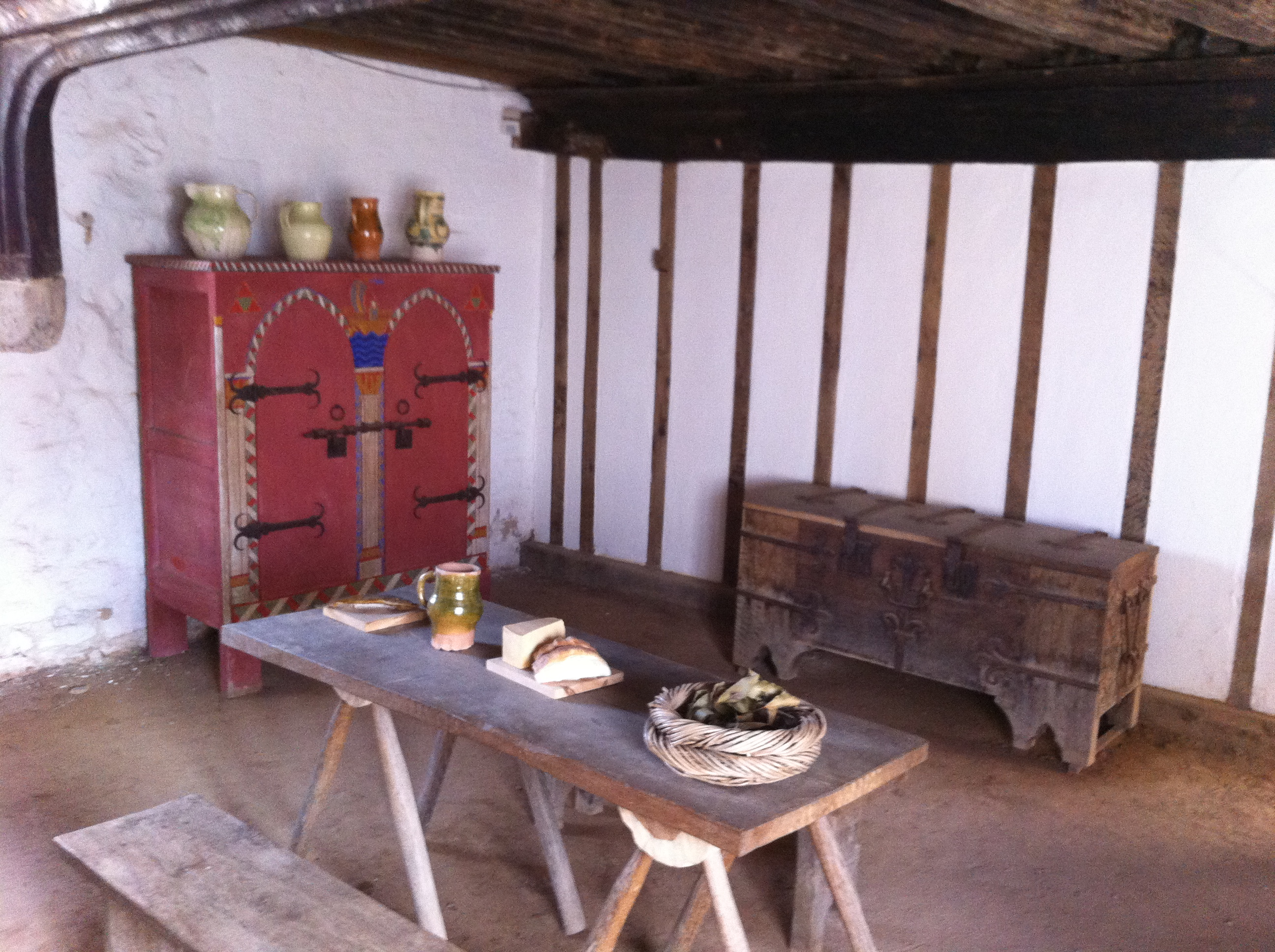
The central hall of a restored 13th-century house, originally built with the profits from European trade

The English economy was fundamentally agricultural, depending on growing crops such as wheat, barley and oats on an open field system, and husbanding sheep, cattle and pigs. In the late Anglo-Saxon period many peasants moved away from living in isolated hamlets and instead came together to form larger villages engaged in arable cultivation. Agricultural land became typically organised around manors, and was divided between some fields that the landowner would manage directly, called demesne land, and the majority of the fields that would be cultivated by local peasants. These peasants would pay rent to the landowner either through agricultural labour on the lord's demesne fields or through rent in the form of cash and produce. By the 11th century, a market economy was flourishing across much of England, while the eastern and southern towns were heavily involved in international trade. Around 6,000 watermills were built to grind flour, freeing up labour for other more productive agricultural tasks.

Although the Norman invasion caused some damage as soldiers looted the countryside and land was confiscated for castle building, the English economy was not greatly affected. Taxes were increased, however, and the Normans established extensive forests that were exploited for their natural resources and protected by royal laws. The next two centuries saw huge growth in the English economy, driven in part by the increase in the population from around 1.5 million in 1086 to between 4 and 5 million in 1300. More land, much of it at the expense of the royal forests, was brought into production to feed the growing population and to produce wool for export to Europe. Many hundreds of new towns, some of them planned communities, were built across England, supporting the creation of guilds, charter fairs and other medieval institutions which governed the growing trade. Jewish financiers played a significant role in funding the growing economy, along with the new Cistercian and Augustinian religious orders that emerged as major players in the wool trade of the north. Mining increased in England, with a silver boom in the 12th century helping to fuel the expansion of the money supply.

Economic growth began to falter at the end of the 13th century, owing to a combination of overpopulation, land shortages and depleted soils. The Great Famine shook the English economy severely and population growth ceased; the first outbreak of the Black Death in 1348 then killed around half the English population. The agricultural sector shrank rapidly, with higher wages, lower prices and diminishing profits leading to the final demise of the old demesne system and the advent of the modern farming system centring on the charging of cash rents for lands. As returns on land fell, many estates, and in some cases entire settlements, were simply abandoned, and nearly 1,500 villages were deserted during this period. A new class of gentry emerged who rented farms from the major nobility. Unsuccessful government attempts were made to regulate wages and consumption, but these largely collapsed in the decades following the Peasants' Revolt of 1381.

The English cloth industry grew considerably at the start of the 15th century, and a new class of international English merchant emerged, typically based in London or the South-West, prospering at the expense of the older, shrinking economies of the eastern towns. These new trading systems brought about the end of many of the international fairs and the rise of the chartered company. Fishing in the North Sea expanded into deeper waters, backed by commercial investment from major merchants. Between 1440 and 1480, however, Europe entered a recession and England suffered the Great Slump: trade collapsed, driving down agricultural prices, rents and ultimately the acceptable levels of royal taxation. The resulting tensions and discontent played an important part in Jack Cade's popular uprising in 1450 and the subsequent Wars of the Roses. By the end of Middle Ages the economy had begun to recover and considerable improvements were being made in metalworking and shipbuilding that would shape the Early Modern economy.

=== Technology and science ===
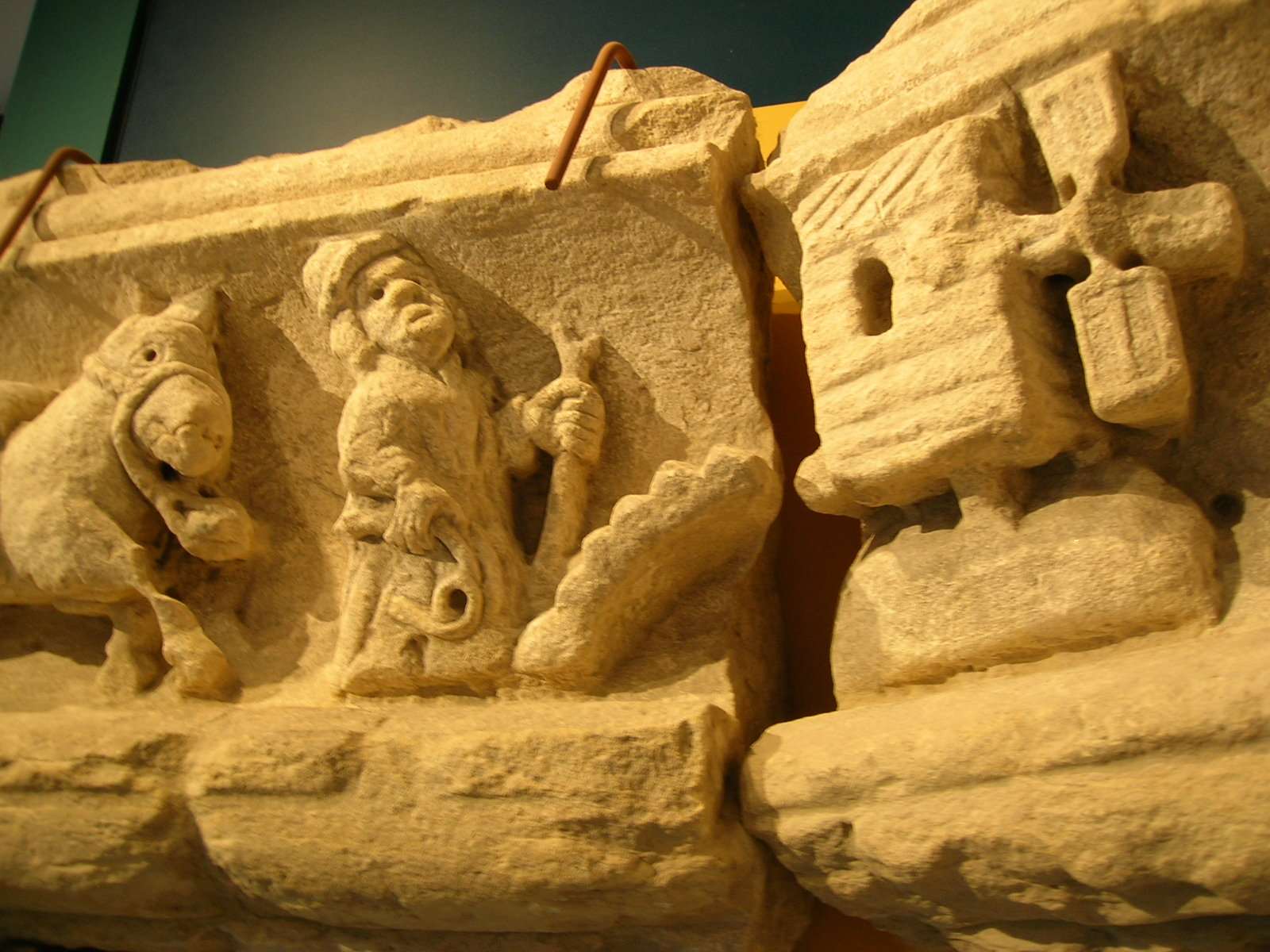
A medieval carving from Rievaulx Abbey showing one of the many new windmills established during the 13th century

Technology and science in England advanced considerably during the Middle Ages, driven in part by the Greek and Islamic thinking that reached England from the 12th century onwards. Many advances were made in scientific ideas, including the introduction of Arabic numerals and a sequence of improvements in the units used for measuring time. Clocks were first built in England in the late 13th century, and the first mechanical clocks were certainly being installed in cathedrals and abbeys by the 1320s. Astrology, magic and palm reading were also considered important forms of knowledge in medieval England, although some doubted their reliability.

The period produced some influential English scholars. Roger Bacon, a philosopher and Franciscan friar, produced works on natural philosophy, astronomy and alchemy; his work set out the theoretical basis for future experimentation in the natural sciences. William of Ockham helped to fuse Latin, Greek and Islamic writing into a general theory of logic; "Ockham's Razor" was one of his oft-cited conclusions. English scholars since the time of Bede had believed the world was probably round, but Johannes de Sacrobosco estimated the circumference of the earth in the 13th century. Despite the limitations of medieval medicine, Gilbertus Anglicus published the Compendium Medicinae, one of the longest medical works ever written in Latin. Prominent historical and science texts began to be translated into English for the first time in the second half of the 14th century, including the Polychronicon and The Travels of Sir John Mandeville. The universities of Oxford and Cambridge were established during the 11th and 12th centuries, drawing on the model of the University of Paris.

Technological advances proceeded in a range of areas. Watermills to grind grain had existed during most of the Anglo-Saxon period, using horizontal mill designs; from the 12th century on many more were built, eliminating the use of hand mills, with the older horizontal mills gradually supplanted by a new vertical mill design. Windmills began to be built in the late 12th century and slowly became more common. Water-powered fulling mills and powered hammers first appeared in the 12th century; water power was harnessed to assist in smelting by the 14th century, with the first blast furnace opening in 1496. New mining methods were developed and horse-powered pumps were installed in English mines by the end of the Middle Ages. The introduction of hopped beer transformed the brewing industry in the 14th century, and new techniques were invented to better preserve fish. Glazed pottery became widespread in the 12th and 13th centuries, with stoneware pots largely replacing wooden plates and bowls by the 15th century. William Caxton and Wynkyn de Worde began using the printing press during the late 15th century. Transport links were also improved; many road bridges were either erected or rebuilt in stone during the long economic boom of the 12th and 13th centuries. England's maritime trade benefited from the introduction of cog ships, and many docks were improved and fitted with cranes for the first time.

== Warfare ==
=== Armies ===
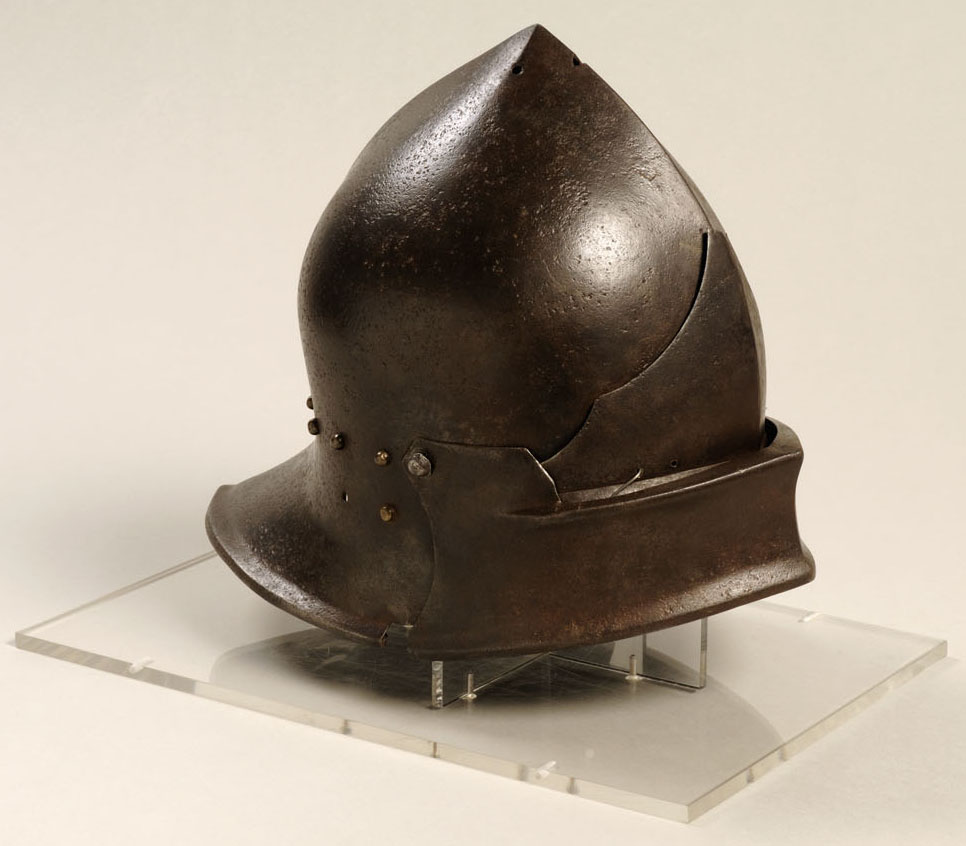
The 15th-century Coventry Sallet

Warfare was endemic in early Anglo-Saxon England, and major conflicts still occurred approximately every generation in the later period. Groups of well-armed noblemen and their households formed the heart of these armies, supported by larger numbers of temporary troops levied from across the kingdom, called the fyrd. By the 9th century, armies of 20,000 men could be called up for campaigns, with another 28,000 men available to guard urban defences. The most common weapon was the spear, with swords used by the wealthier nobles; cavalry was probably less common than in wider Europe, but some Anglo-Saxons did fight from horseback. The Viking attacks on England in the 9th century led to developments in tactics, including the use of shield walls in battle, and the Scandinavian seizure of power in the 11th century introduced housecarls, a form of elite household soldier who protected the king.

Anglo-Norman warfare was characterised by attritional military campaigns, in which commanders tried to raid enemy lands and seize castles in order to allow them to take control of their adversaries' territory, ultimately winning slow but strategic victories. Pitched battles were occasionally fought between armies but these were considered risky engagements and usually avoided by prudent commanders. The armies of the period comprised bodies of mounted, armoured knights, supported by infantry. Crossbowmen become more numerous in the 12th century, alongside the older shortbow. At the heart of these armies was the familia regis, the permanent military household of the king, which was supported in war by feudal levies, drawn up by local nobles for a limited period of service during a campaign. Mercenaries were increasingly employed, driving up the cost of warfare considerably, and adequate supplies of ready cash became essential for the success of campaigns.

In the late 13th century Edward I expanded the familia regis to become a small standing army, forming the core of much larger armies up to 28,700 strong, largely comprising foot soldiers, for campaigns in Scotland and France. By the time of Edward III, armies were smaller in size, but the troops were typically better equipped and uniformed, and the archers carried the longbow, a potentially devastating weapon. Cannons were first used by English forces at battles such as Crécy in 1346. Soldiers began to be contracted for specific campaigns, a practice which may have hastened the development of the armies of retainers that grew up under bastard feudalism. By the late 15th century, however, English armies were somewhat backward by wider European standards; the Wars of the Roses were fought by inexperienced soldiers, often with outdated weapons, allowing the European forces which intervened in the conflict to have a decisive effect on the outcomes of battles.

=== Navies ===
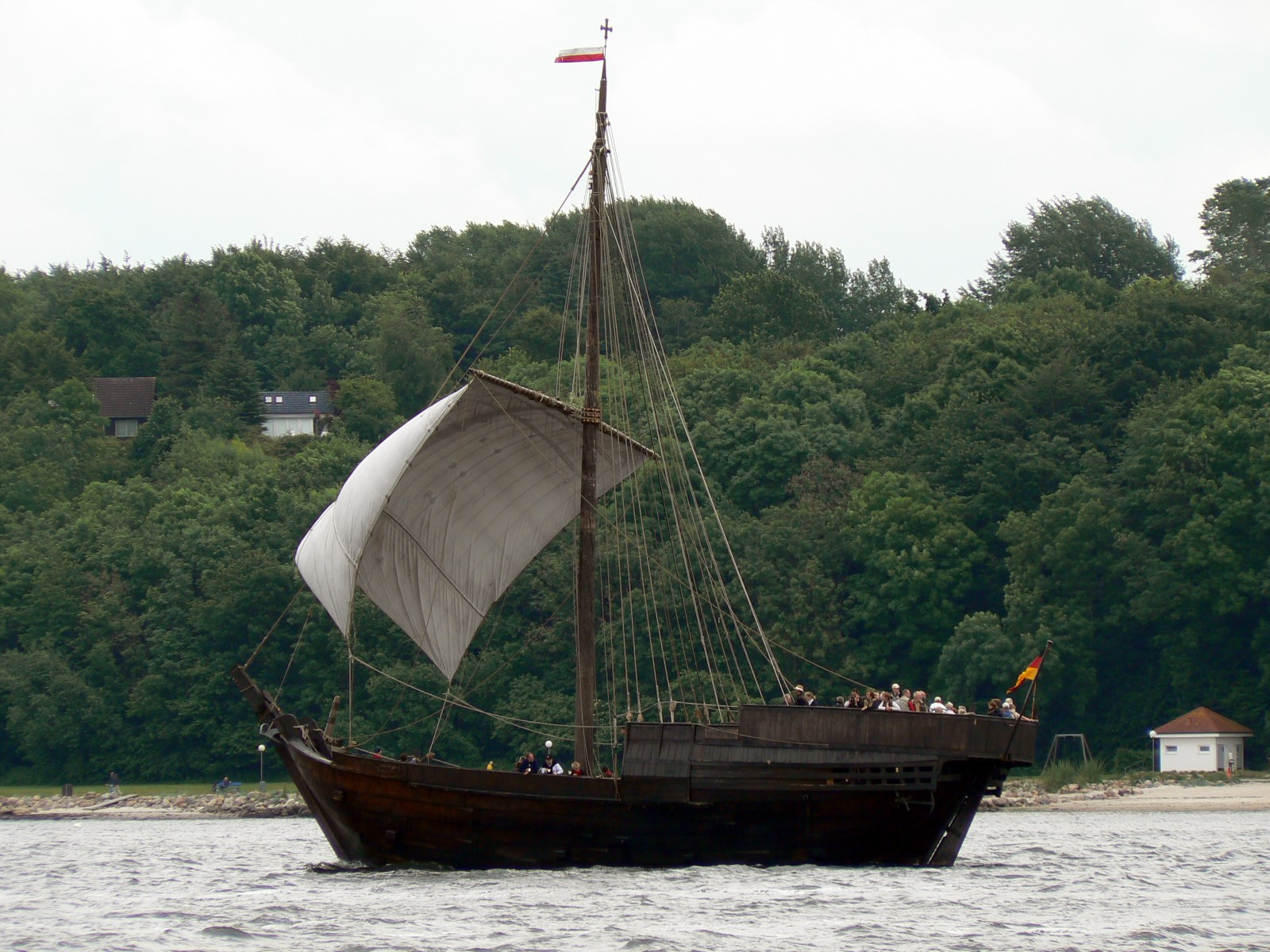
A reconstruction of a medieval cog

The first references to an English navy occur in 851, when chroniclers described Wessex ships defeating a Viking fleet. These early fleets were limited in size but grew in size in the 10th century, allowing the power of Wessex to be projected across the Irish Sea and the English Channel; Cnut's fleet had as many as 40 vessels, while Edward the Confessor could muster 80 ships. Some ships were manned by sailors called lithesmen and bustsecarls, probably drawn from the coastal towns, while other vessels were mobilised as part of a national levy and manned by their regular crews. Naval forces played an important role during the rest of the Middle Ages, enabling the transportation of troops and supplies, raids into hostile territory and attacks on enemy fleets. English naval power became particularly important after the loss of Normandy in 1204, which turned the English Channel from a friendly transit route into a contested and critical border region. English fleets in the 13th and 14th centuries typically comprised specialist vessels, such as galleys and large transport ships, and pressed merchant vessels conscripted into action; the latter increasingly included cogs, a new form of sailing ship. Battles might be fought when one fleet found another at anchor, such as the English victory at Sluys in 1340, or in more open waters, as off the coast of Winchelsea in 1350; raiding campaigns, such as the French attacks on the south of England between 1338 and 1339, could cause devastation from which some towns never fully recovered.

=== Fortifications ===
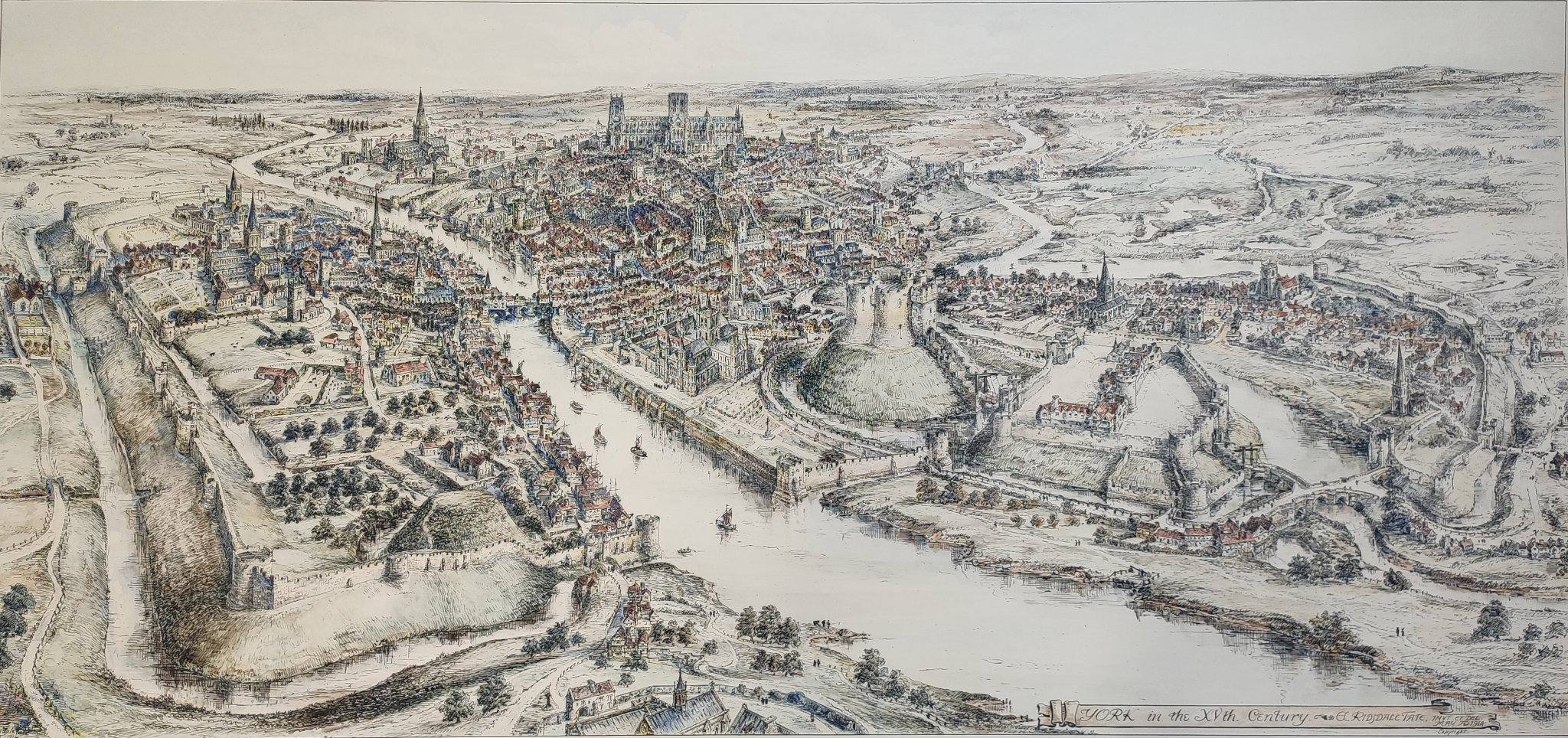
A reconstruction of the city of York in the 15th century, showing the city walls, the Old Baile (left) and York Castle (right)

Many of the fortifications built by the Romans in England survived into the Middle Ages, including the walls surrounding their military forts and cities. These defences were often reused during the unstable post-Roman period. The Anglo-Saxon kings undertook significant planned urban expansion in the 8th and 9th centuries, creating burhs, often protected with earth and wood ramparts. Burh walls sometimes utilised older Roman fortifications, both for practical reasons and to bolster their owners' reputations through the symbolism of former Roman power.

Although a small number of castles had been built in England during the 1050s, after the conquest the Normans began to build timber motte and bailey and ringwork castles in large numbers to control their newly occupied territories. During the 12th century the Normans began to build more castles in stone, with characteristic square keeps that supported both military and political functions. Royal castles were used to control key towns and forests, whilst baronial castles were used by the Norman lords to control their widespread estates; a feudal system called the castle-guard was sometimes used to provide garrisons. Castles and sieges continued to grow in military sophistication during the 12th century, and in the 13th century new defensive town walls were constructed across England.

By the 14th century, castles were combining defences with luxurious, sophisticated living arrangements and landscaped gardens and parks. Early gunpowder weapons were used to defend castles by the end of the 14th century and gunports became an essential feature for a fashionable castle. The economics of maintaining castles meant that many were left to decline or abandoned; in contrast, a small number of castles were developed by the very wealthy into palaces that hosted lavish feasts and celebrations amid elaborate architecture. Smaller defensible structures called tower houses emerged in the north of England to protect against the Scottish threat. By the late medieval period, town walls were increasingly less military in character and more often expressions of civic pride or part of urban governance: many grand gatehouses were built in the 14th and 15th centuries for these purposes.

== Arts ==
=== Art ===
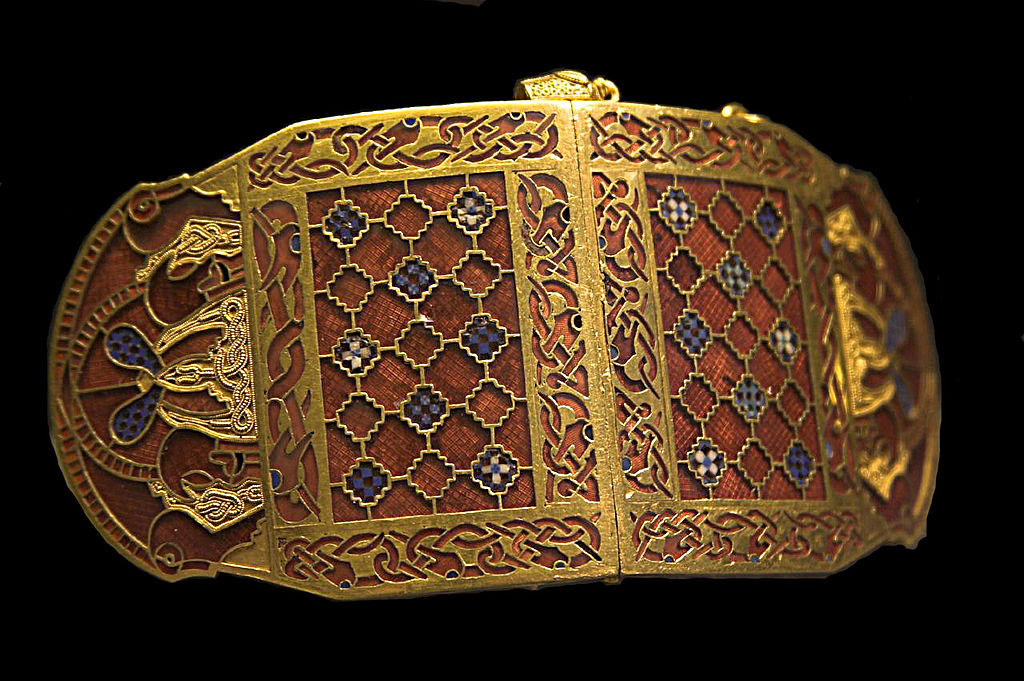
Anglo-Saxon shoulder clasp, with geometric designs and zoomorphic boars on the ends

Medieval England produced art in the form of paintings, carvings, books, fabrics and many functional but beautiful objects. A wide range of materials was used, including gold, glass and ivory, the art usually drawing overt attention to the materials utilised in the designs. Anglo-Saxon artists created carved ivories, illuminated manuscripts, embroidered cloths, crosses and stone sculpture, although relatively few of these have survived to the modern period. They produced a wide range of metalwork, frequently using gold and garnets, with brooches, buckles, sword hilts and drinking horns particularly favoured designs. Early designs, such as those found at the Sutton Hoo burial, used a zoomorphic style, heavily influenced by Germanic fashions, in which animal shapes were distorted into flowing shapes and positioned alongside geometric patterns. From the 7th century onwards more naturalistic designs became popular, showing a plasticity of form and incorporating both animals and people into the designs. In the 10th century, Carolingian styles, inspired by Classical imagery, began to enter from the continent, becoming widely used in the reformed Benedictine monasteries across the south and east of England.

The Norman conquest introduced northern French artistic styles, particular in illuminated manuscripts and murals, and reduced the demand for carvings. In other artistic areas, including embroidery, the Anglo-Saxon influence remained evident into the 12th century, and the famous Bayeux Tapestry is an example of older styles being reemployed under the new regime. Stained glass became a distinctive form of English art during this later medieval period, although the coloured glass for these works was almost entirely imported from Europe. Little early stained glass in England has survived, but it typically had both an ornamental and educational function, while later works also commemorated the sponsors of the windows into the designs. English tapestry making and embroidery in the early 14th century were of an especially high quality; works produced by nuns and London professionals were exported across Europe, becoming known as the opus anglicanum. English illuminated books, such as the Queen Mary Psalter, were also famous in this period, featuring rich decoration, a combination of grotesque and natural figures and rich colours. The quality of illuminated art in England declined significantly in the face of competition from Flanders in the 14th century, and later English illuminated medieval pieces generally imitated Flemish styles.

=== Literature, drama and music ===
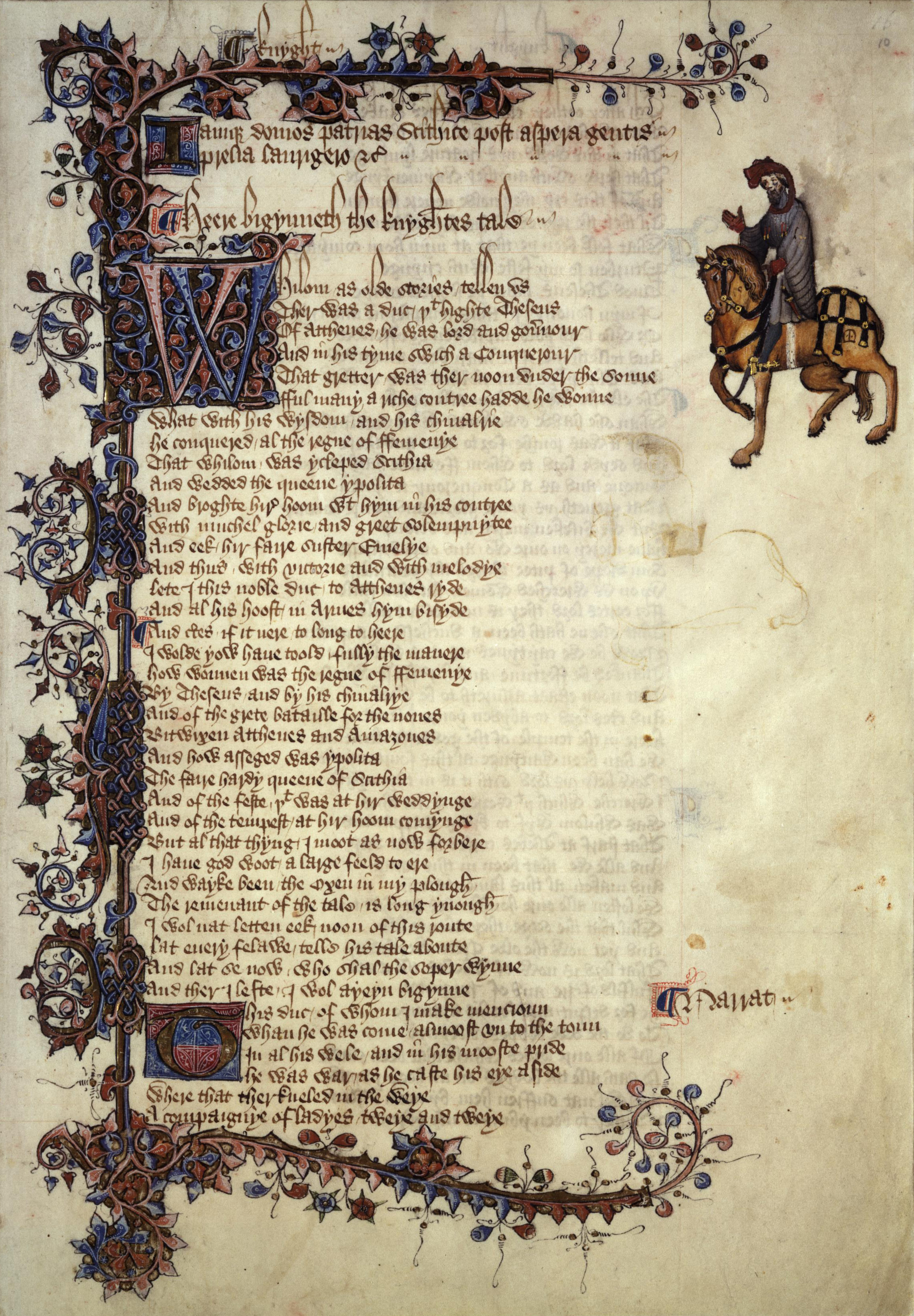
The Ellesmere illuminated manuscript of the Canterbury Tales by Geoffrey Chaucer, early 15th-century, showing the Knight (right)

The Anglo-Saxons produced extensive poetry in Old English, some of which was written down as early as the 9th century, although most surviving poems were compiled in the 10th and early 11th century. Beowulf, probably written between 650 and 750, is typical of these poems, portraying a vivid, heroic tale, ending with the protagonist's death at the hands of a dragon, but still showing signs of the new Christian influences in England. Old English was also used for academic and courtly writing from the 9th century onwards, including translations of popular foreign works, including The Pastoral Care.

Poetry and stories written in French were popular after the Norman conquest, and by the 12th century some works on English history began to be produced in French verse. Romantic poems about tournaments and courtly love became popular in Paris and this fashion spread into England in the form of lays; stories about the court of King Arthur were also fashionable, due in part to the interest of Henry II. English continued to be used on a modest scale to write local religious works and some poems in the north of England, but most major works were produced in Latin or French. In the reign of Richard II there was an upsurge in the use of Middle English in poetry, sometimes termed "Ricardian poetry", although the works still emulated French fashions. The work of Geoffrey Chaucer from the 1370s onwards, however, culminating in the influential Canterbury Tales, was uniquely English in style. Major pieces of courtly poetry continued to be produced into the 15th century by Chaucer's disciples, and Thomas Malory compiled the older Arthurian tales to produce Le Morte d'Arthur.

Music and singing were important in England during the medieval period, being used in religious ceremonies, court occasions and to accompany theatrical works. Singing techniques called gymel were introduced in England in the 13th century, accompanied by instruments such as the guitar, harp, pipes and organ. Henry IV sponsored an extensive range of music in England, while his son Henry V brought back many influences from occupied France. Carols became an important form of music in the 15th century; originally these had been a song sung during a dance with a prominent refrain — the 15th century form lost the dancing and introduced strong religious overtones. Ballads were also popular from the late 14th century onwards, including the Ballad of Chevy Chase and others describing the activities of Robin Hood. Miracle plays were performed to communicate the Bible in various locations. By the late 14th century, these had been extended into vernacular mystery plays which performed annually over several days, broken up into various cycles of plays; a handful have survived into the 21st century. Guilds competed to produce the best plays in each town and performances were often an expression of civic identity.

=== Architecture ===
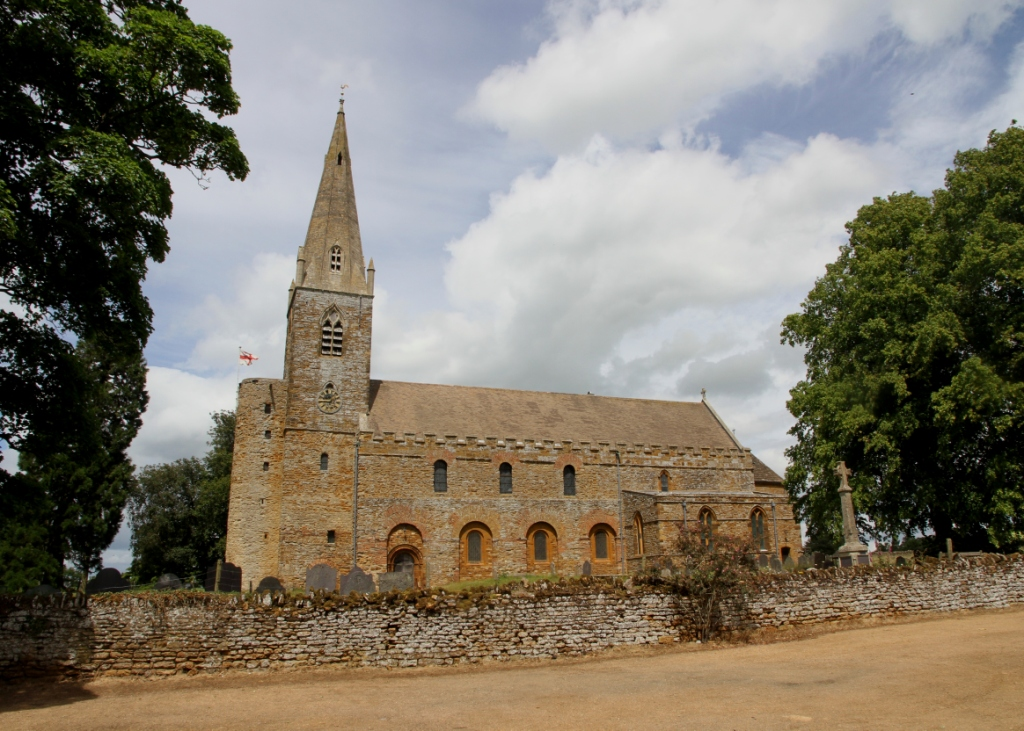
The Romanesque All Saints' Church, Brixworth, late 7th–8th century

In the century after the collapse of the Romano-British economy, very few substantial buildings were constructed and many villas and towns were abandoned. New long- and round-houses were constructed in some settlements, while in others timber buildings were built imitating the older Roman styles. The Germanic immigrants constructed small rectangular buildings from wood, and occasionally grander halls. However, the conversion to Christianity in the 6th and 7th centuries reintroduced Italian and French masons, and these craftsmen built stone churches, low in height, following a narrow, rectangular plan, plastered inside and fitted with glass and colourful vestments. This Romanesque style developed throughout the period, featuring characteristic circular arches. By the 10th and 11th centuries, much larger churches and monastery buildings were being built, featuring square and circular towers after the contemporary European fashion. The palaces constructed for the nobility centred on great timber halls, while manor houses began to appear in rural areas.

The Normans brought with them architectural styles from their own duchy, where austere stone churches were preferred. Under the early Norman kings this style was adapted to produce large, plain cathedrals with ribbed vaulting. During the 12th century the Anglo-Norman style became richer and more ornate, with pointed arches derived from French architecture replacing the curved Romanesque designs; this style is termed Early English Gothic and continued, with variation, throughout the rest of the Middle Ages. In the early 14th century the Perpendicular Gothic style was created in England, with an emphasis on verticality, immense windows and soaring arcades. Fine timber roofs in a variety of styles, but in particular the hammerbeam, were built in many English buildings. In the 15th century the architectural focus turned away from cathedrals and monasteries in favour of parish churches, often decorated with richly carved woodwork; in turn, these churches influenced the design of new chantry chapels for existing cathedrals.

Meanwhile, domestic architecture had continued to develop, with the Normans, having first occupied the older Anglo-Saxon dwellings, rapidly beginning to build larger buildings in stone and timber. The elite preferred houses with large, ground-floor halls but the less wealthy constructed simpler houses with the halls on the first floor; master and servants frequently lived in the same spaces. Wealthier town-houses were also built using stone, and incorporated business and domestic arrangements into a single functional design. By the 14th century grander houses and castles were sophisticated affairs: expensively tiled, often featuring murals and glass windows, these buildings were often designed as a set of apartments to allow greater privacy. Fashionable brick began to be used in some parts of the country, copying French tastes. Architecture that emulated the older defensive designs remained popular. Less is known about the houses of peasants during this period, although many peasants appear to have lived in relatively substantial, timber-framed long-houses; the quality of these houses improved in the prosperous years following the Black Death, often being built by professional craftsmen.

== Legacy ==
=== Historiography ===
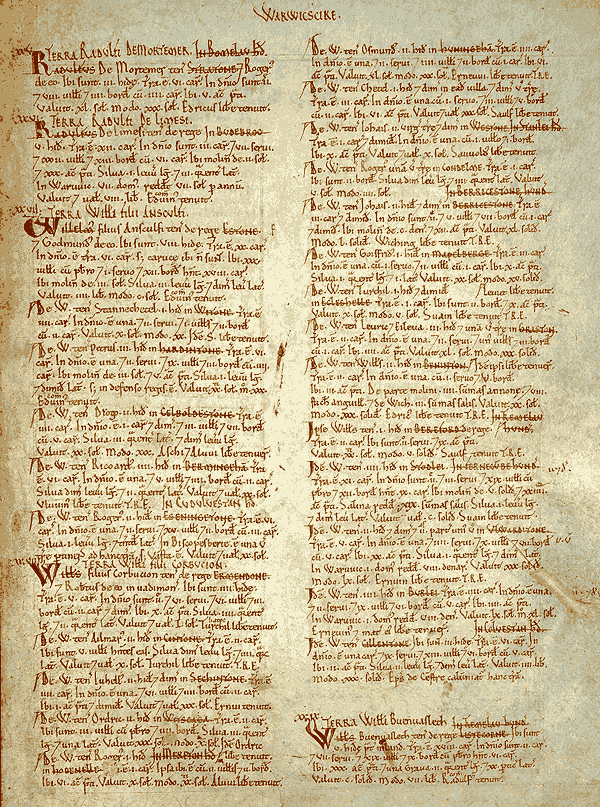
A page of Domesday Book for Warwickshire; a key source for historians

The first history of medieval England was written by Bede in the 8th century; many more accounts of contemporary and ancient history followed, usually termed chronicles. In the 16th century, the first academic histories began to be written, typically drawing primarily on the chroniclers and interpreting them in the light of current political concerns. Edward Gibbon's 18th-century writings were influential, presenting the medieval period as a dark age between the glories of Rome and the rebirth of civilisation in the Early Modern period. Late Victorian historians continued to use the chroniclers as sources, but also deployed documents such as Domesday Book and Magna Carta, alongside newly discovered financial, legal and commercial records. They produced a progressive account of political and economic development in England. The growth of the British Empire spurred interest in the various periods of English hegemony during the Middle Ages, including the Angevin Empire and the Hundred Years' War.

By the 1930s, older historical analyses were challenged by a range of neo-positivist, Marxist and econometric approaches, supported by a widening body of documentary, archaeological and scientific evidence. Marxist and Neo-Marxist analyses continued to be popular in the post-war years, producing seminal works on economic issues and social protests. Post-modern analysis became influential in the 1970s and 1980s, focusing on identity, gender, interpretation and culture. Many studies focused on particular regions or groups, drawing on new records and new scientific approaches, including landscape and environmental archaeology. Fresh archaeological finds, such as the Staffordshire Hoard, continue to challenge previous interpretations, and historical studies of England in the Middle Ages have never been so diverse as in the early 21st century.

=== Popular representations ===
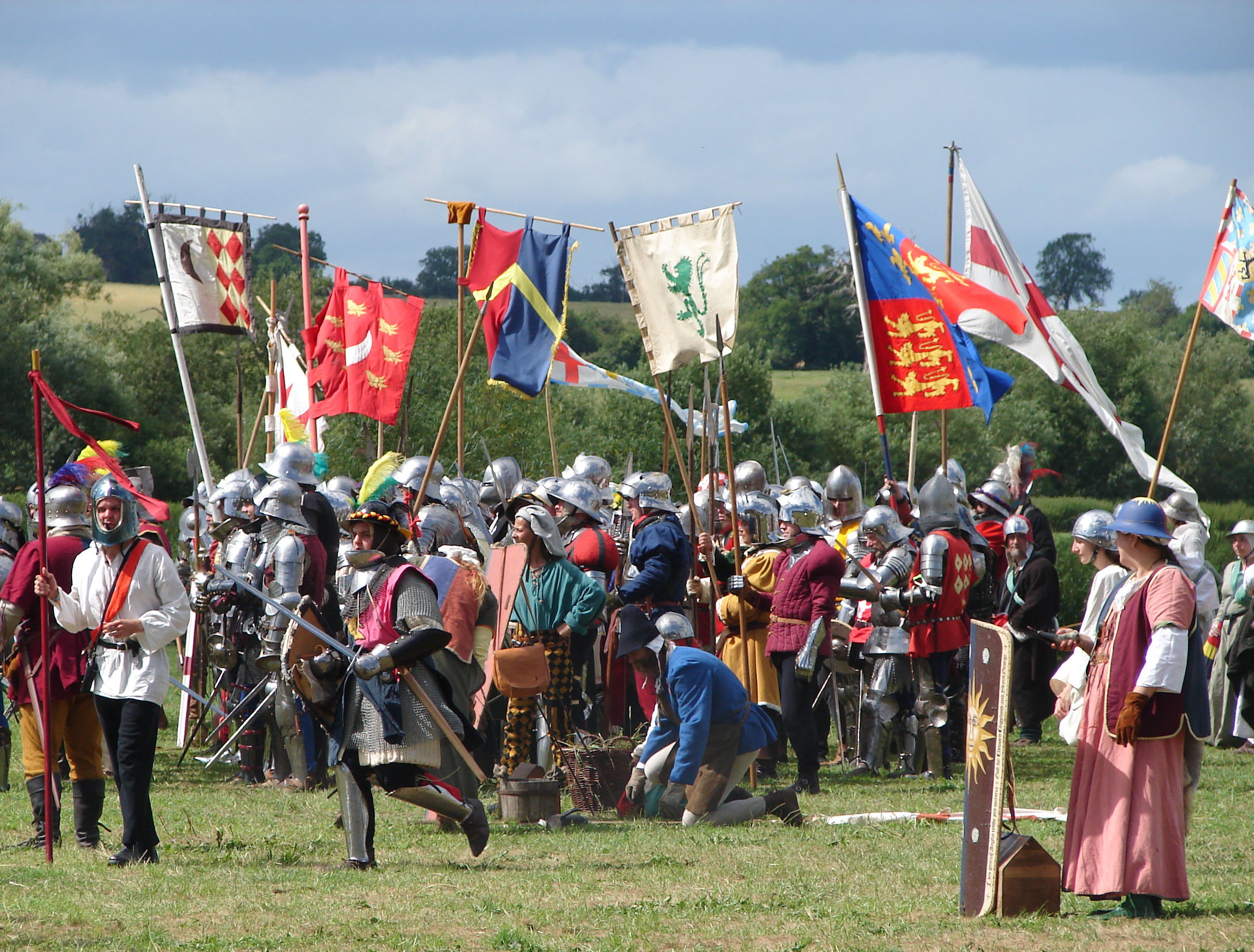
Re-enactments of English medieval events, such as the battle of Tewkesbury shown here, form part of the modern heritage industry

The period has also been used in a wide range of popular culture. William Shakespeare's plays on the lives of the medieval kings have proved to have had long lasting appeal, heavily influencing both popular interpretations and histories of figures such as King John and Henry V. Other playwrights have since taken key medieval events, such as the death of Thomas Becket, and used them to draw out contemporary themes and issues. The medieval mystery plays continue to be enacted in key English towns and cities. Film-makers have drawn extensively on the medieval period, often taking themes from Shakespeare or the Robin Hood ballads for inspiration. Historical fiction set in England during the Middle Ages remains persistently popular, with the 1980s and 1990s seeing a particular growth of historical detective fiction. The period has also inspired fantasy writers, including J. R. R. Tolkien's stories of Middle-earth. English medieval music was revived from the 1950s, with choral and musical groups attempting to authentically reproduce the original sounds. Medieval living history events were first held during the 19th and early 20th centuries, and the period has inspired a considerable community of historical re-enactors, part of England's growing heritage industry.

== Bibliography ==
=== Surveys ===
- Bartlett, Robert. England Under the Norman and Angevin Kings, 1075–1225 (New Oxford History of England) (2002) excerpt and text search
- Barlow, Frank (1999). The Feudal Kingdom of England, 1042–1216. Harlow, UK: Pearson Education. ISBN 978-0-582-03081-7.
- Carpenter, David (2004). The Struggle for Mastery: The Penguin History of Britain 1066–1284. London: Penguin. ISBN 978-0-14-014824-4.
- Fleming, Robin (2011). Britain After Rome: The Fall and Rise, 400 to 1070. London: Penguin Books. ISBN 978-0-14-014823-7.
- Given-Wilson, Chris, ed. (1996). An Illustrated History of Late Medieval England. Manchester, UK: Manchester University Press. ISBN 978-0-7190-4152-5.
- Hinton, David (2002). Archaeology, Economy and Society: England from the Fifth to the Fifteenth Century. Abingdon, UK: Routledge. ISBN 978-0-203-03984-7.
- Hodgett, Gerald (2006). A Social and Economic History of Medieval Europe. Abingdon, UK: Routledge. ISBN 978-0-415-37707-2.
- Huscroft, Richard (2005). Ruling England, 1042–1217. Harlow, UK: Pearson. ISBN 0-582-84882-2.
- Mate, Mavis E. (2001). Women in Medieval English Society. Cambridge, UK: Cambridge University Press. ISBN 978-0-521-58733-4.
- Myers, A. R. (1978). English Society in the Late Middle Ages, 1066–1307 (8th ed.). Harmondsworth, UK: Penguin. ISBN 0-14-020234-X.
- Rubin, Miri (2006). The Hollow Crown: The Penguin History of Britain 1272–1485. London: Penguin. ISBN 978-0-14-014825-1.
- Stenton, Doris Mary (1976). English Society in the Early Middle Ages, 1066–1307. Harmondsworth, UK: Penguin. ISBN 0-14-020252-8.
- White, Graeme J. (2000). Restoration and Reform, 1153–1165: Recovery From Civil War in England. Cambridge: Cambridge University Press. ISBN 978-0-521-55459-6.
- Whitelock, Dorothy (1972). The Beginnings of English Society (2nd ed.). Harmondsworth, UK: Penguin Books. ISBN 0-14-020245-5.

=== Kings ===
- Aurell, Martin (2003). L'Empire des Plantagenêt, 1154–1224 (in French). Paris: Tempus. ISBN 978-2-262-02282-2.
- Aurell, Martin (2007). "Henry II and Arthurian Legend". In Harper-Bill, Christopher; Vincent, Nicholas (eds.). Henry II: New Interpretations. Woodbridge, UK: Boydell Press. ISBN 978-1-84383-340-6.
- Barber, Richard (2007a). "Why Did Edward III Hold the Round Table? The Chivalric Background". In Munby, Julian; Barber, Richard; Brown, Richard (eds.). Edward III's Round Table at Windsor. Woodbridge, UK: Boydell Press. ISBN 978-1-84383-391-8.
- Barber, Richard (2007b). "The Order of the Round Table". In Munby, Julian; Barber, Richard; Brown, Richard (eds.). Edward III's Round Table at Windsor. Woodbridge, UK: Boydell Press. ISBN 978-1-84383-391-8.
- Bradbury, Jim (2009). Stephen and Matilda: the Civil War of 1139–53. Stroud, UK: The History Press. ISBN 978-0-7509-3793-1.
- Chibnall, Marjorie (1993). The Empress Matilda: Queen Consort, Queen Mother and Lady of the English. Oxford, UK: Blackwell. ISBN 978-0-631-19028-8.
- Davis, Ralph Henry Carless (1977). King Stephen (1st ed.). London: Longman. ISBN 0-582-48727-7.
- Doherty, P. C. (2003). Isabella and the Strange Death of Edward II. London: Robinson. ISBN 1-84119-843-9.
- Douglas, David Charles (1962). William the Conqueror: The Norman Impact Upon England. Berkeley, US: University of California Press. ISBN 978-0-520-00348-4.
- Hollister, C. Warren (2003). Henry I (Yale ed.). New Haven, U.S.: Yale University Press. ISBN 978-0-300-09829-7.
- King, Edmund (2007). "The Accession of Henry II". In Harper-Bill, Christopher; Vincent, Nicholas (eds.). Henry II: New Interpretations. Woodbridge, UK: Boydell Press. ISBN 978-1-84383-340-6.
- Jones, Dan (10 May 2012). The Plantagenets: The Kings Who Made England. HarperCollins Publishers. ISBN 978-0-00-745749-6.
- King, Edmund (2010). King Stephen. New Haven, US: Yale University Press. ISBN 978-0-300-11223-8.
- Mortimer, Ian (2008). The Perfect King: The Life of Edward III, Father of the English Nation. London: Vintage. ISBN 978-0-09-952709-1.
- Prestwich, J. O. (1992a). "The Military Household of the Norman Kings". In Strickland, Matthew (ed.). Anglo-Norman Warfare. Woodbridge, UK: Boydell Press. ISBN 0-85115-327-5.
- Prestwich, Michael (1988). Edward I. Berkeley and Los Angeles, US: University of California Press. ISBN 978-0-520-06266-5.
- Prestwich, Michael (2003). The Three Edwards: War and State in England, 1272–1377 (2nd ed.). London: Routledge. ISBN 978-0-415-30309-5.
- Raban, Sandra (2000). England Under Edward I and Edward II, 1259–1327. Oxford, UK: Blackwell. ISBN 978-0-631-22320-7.
- Stringer, Keith J. (1993). The Reign of Stephen: Kingship, Warfare and Government in Twelfth-Century England. London: Routledge. ISBN 978-0-415-01415-1.
- Turner, Ralph V. (2009). King John: England's Evil King?. Stroud, UK: History Press. ISBN 978-0-7524-4850-3.
- Vincent, Nicholas (2007). "Introduction: Henry II and the Historians". In Harper-Bill, Christopher; Vincent, Nicholas (eds.). Henry II: New Interpretations. Woodbridge, UK: Boydell Press. ISBN 978-1-84383-340-6.
- Warren, W. Lewis (1991). King John. London: Methuen. ISBN 0-413-45520-3.
- Warren, W. L. (2000). Henry II (Yale ed.). New Haven, U.S.: Yale University Press. ISBN 978-0-300-08474-0.

=== Architecture, castles, churches, landscape ===
- Baker, John (1978). English Stained Glass of the Medieval Period. London: Thames and Hudson. ISBN 0-500-27128-3.
- Brown, R. Allen (1962). English Castles. London: Batsford. OCLC 1392314.
- Cantor, Leonard (1982). "Introduction: The English Medieval Landscape". In Cantor, Leonard (ed.). The English Medieval Landscape. London: Croon Helm. ISBN 978-0-7099-0707-7.
- Coppack, Glyn (2003). Medieval Merchant's House, Southampton. London: English Heritage. ISBN 1-85074-354-1.
- Creighton, Oliver Hamilton (2005). Castles and Landscapes: Power, Community and Fortification in Medieval England. London: Equinox. ISBN 978-1-904768-67-8.
- Creighton, Oliver Hamilton; Robert, Higham (2005). Medieval Town Walls: An Archaeology and Social History of Urban Defence. Stroud, UK: Tempus. ISBN 978-0-7524-1445-4.
- Emery, Anthony (2007). Discovering Medieval Houses. Risborough, UK: Shire Publications. ISBN 978-0-7478-0655-4.
- Gilchrist, Roberta (2006). Norwich Cathedral Close: The Evolution of the English Cathedral Landscape. Woodbridge, UK: Boydell Press. ISBN 978-1-84383-173-0.
- Hill, Donald Routledge (1996). A History of Engineering in Classical and Medieval Times. London: Routledge. ISBN 978-0-415-15291-4.
- Hulme, Richard (2007–2008). "Twelfth Century Great Towers – The Case for the Defence" (PDF). The Castle Studies Group Journal (21): 209–229.
- Liddiard, Robert (2005). Castles in Context: Power, Symbolism and Landscape, 1066 to 1500. Macclesfield, UK: Windgather Press. ISBN 0-9545575-2-2.
- Marks, Richard (1993). Stained Glass in England During the Middle Ages. London: Routledge. ISBN 978-0-415-03345-9.
- Marks, Richard (2001). "Window Glass". In Blair, John; Ramsay, Nigel (eds.). English Medieval Industries: Craftsmen, Techniques, Products. London: Hambledon Press. ISBN 978-1-85285-326-6.
- McClendon, Charles B. (2005). The Origins of Medieval Architecture: Building in Europe, A.D 600-900. New Haven and London: Yale University Press. ISBN 978-0-300-10688-6.
- Nilson, Ben (2001). Cathedral Shrines of Medieval England. Woodbridge, UK: Boydell Press. ISBN 978-0-85115-808-2.
- Pantin, W. A. (1963). "Medieval English Town-House Plans" (PDF). Medieval Archaeology. 6–7: 202–239. doi:10.1080/00766097.1962.11735667.
- Pounds, Norman John Greville (1994). The Medieval Castle in England and Wales: A Social and Political History. Cambridge, UK: Cambridge University Press. ISBN 978-0-521-45828-3.
- Pounds, Norman John Greville (2005). The Medieval City. Westport, US: Greenwood Press. ISBN 978-0-313-32498-7.
- Prior, Stuart (2006). A Few Well-Positioned Castles: The Norman Art of War. Stroud, UK: Tempus. ISBN 978-0-7524-3651-7.
- Reid, Stuart (2006). Castles and Tower Houses of the Scottish Clans, 1450–1650. Botley, UK: Osprey Publishing. ISBN 978-1-84176-962-2.
- Rotherham, Ian D. (2007). "The Historical Ecology of Medieval Parks and the Implications for Conservation". In Liddiard, Robert (ed.). The Medieval Park: New Perspectives. Macclesfield, UK: Windgather Press. ISBN 978-1-905119-16-5.
- Steane, John (1999). The Archaeology of the Medieval English Monarchy. London: Routledge. ISBN 978-0-415-19788-5.

=== Specialized studies ===
- Aberth, John (2001). From the Brink of the Apocalypse: Confronting Famine, War, Plague and Death in the Later Middle Ages. London: Routledge. ISBN 0-415-92715-3.
- Airlie, Stuart (2001). "Strange Eventful Histories: The Middle Ages in the Cinema". In Linehan, Peter; Nelson, Janet L. (eds.). The Medieval World. London: Routledge. ISBN 978-0-415-30234-0.
- Alexander, James W. (1970). "The Becket Controversy in Recent Historiography". The Journal of British Studies. 9 (2): 1–26. doi:10.1086/385589. JSTOR 175153. S2CID 163007102.
- Aston, Margaret; Richmond, Colin (1997). "Introduction". In Aston, Margaret; Richmond, Colin (eds.). Lollardy and the Gentry in the Later Middle Ages. Stroud, UK: Sutton. ISBN 978-0-312-17388-3.
- Bachrach, Bernard S. (2005). "On Roman Ramparts 300-1300". In Parker, Geoffrey (ed.). The Cambridge History Of Warfare. Cambridge, UK: Cambridge University Press. ISBN 978-0-521-85359-0.
- Bailey, Mark (1996). "Population and Economic Resources". In Given-Wilson, Chris (ed.). An Illustrated History of Late Medieval England. Manchester, UK: Manchester University Press. ISBN 978-0-7190-4152-5.
- Barlow, Frank (1986). Thomas Becket. London: Weidenfeld & Nicolson. ISBN 978-0-297-79189-8.
- Barron, Caroline (2005). London in the Later Middle Ages: Government and People 1200–1500. Oxford, UK: Oxford University Press. ISBN 978-0-19-928441-2.
- Bevington, David (2002). "Literature and the theatre". In Loewenstein, David; Mueller, Janel M. (eds.). The Cambridge History of Early Modern English Literature. Cambridge, UK: Cambridge University Press. ISBN 978-0-521-63156-3.
- Blanchard, Ian (2002). "Lothian and Beyond: the Economy of the "English Empire" of David I". In Britnell, Richard; Hatcher, John (eds.). Progress and Problems in Medieval England: Essays in Honour of Edward Miller. Cambridge, UK: Cambridge University Press. ISBN 978-0-521-52273-1.
- Burton, Janet E. (1994). Monastic and Religious Orders in Britain, 1000–1300. Cambridge, UK: Cambridge University Press. ISBN 978-0-521-37797-3.
- Cobban, Alan B. (1975). The Medieval Universities: Their Development and Organization. London: Methuen. ISBN 978-0-416-81250-3.
- Coss, Peter (2002). "From Feudalism to Bastard Feudalism". In Fryde, Natalie; Monnet, Pierre; Oexle, Oto (eds.). The Presence of Feudalism. Göttingen, Germany: Vandenhoeck and Ruprecht. ISBN 978-3-525-35391-2.
- Cowie, Jonathan (2007). Climate Change: Biological and Human Aspects. Cambridge, UK: Cambridge University Press. ISBN 978-0-521-69619-7.
- Crouch, David (2005). The Birth of Nobility: Constructing Aristocracy in England and France : 900–1300. Harlow: Pearson. ISBN 978-0-582-36981-8.
- Danziger, Danny; Gillingham, John (2004). 1215: The Year of Magna Carta. London: Hodder and Stoughton. ISBN 978-0-340-82475-7.
- Davidson, Hilda Ellis (1998). The Sword in Anglo-Saxon England: Its Archaeology and Literature. Woodbridge, UK: Boydell Press. ISBN 978-0-85115-716-0.
- Davies, R. R. (1990). Domination and Conquest: The Experience of Ireland, Scotland and Wales, 1100–1300. Cambridge, UK: Cambridge University Press. ISBN 978-0-521-02977-3.
- Driver, Martha W.; Ray, Sid (2009). "General Introduction". In Driver, Martha W.; Ray, Sid (eds.). Shakespeare and the Middle Ages: Essays on the Performance and Adaptation of the Plays with Medieval Sources or Settings. Jefferson, US: McFarland. ISBN 978-0-7864-3405-3.
- Duggan, Charles (1962). "The Becket Dispute and the Criminous Clerks". Bulletin of the Institute of Historical Research. 35 (91): 1–28. doi:10.1111/j.1468-2281.1962.tb01411.x.
- Dyer, Christopher (2000). Everyday Life in Medieval England. London: Hambledon and London. ISBN 978-1-85285-201-6.
- Dyer, Christopher (2009). Making a Living in the Middle Ages: The People of Britain 850-1520. New Haven, US and London: Yale University Press. ISBN 978-0-300-10191-1.
- Forey, Alan (1992). The Military Orders From the Twelfth to the Early Fourteenth Centuries. Basingstoke, UK: Macmillan. ISBN 978-0-333-46235-5.
- Geddes, Jane (2001). "Iron". In Blair, John; Ramsay, Nigel (eds.). English Medieval Industries: Craftsmen, Techniques, Products. London: Hambledon Press. ISBN 978-1-85285-326-6.
- Getz, Faye Marie (1991). Healing and Society in Medieval England: A Middle English Translation of the Pharmaceutical Writings of Gilberus Anglicus. Wisconsin, US: University of Wisconsin Press. ISBN 978-0-299-12930-9.
- Hackett, Jeremiah (1997). "Roger Bacon: His Career, Life and Works". In Hackett, Jeremiah (ed.). Roger Bacon and the Sciences: Commemorative Essays. Leiden, the Netherlands: BRILL. ISBN 978-90-04-10015-2.
- Halsall, Guy (2003). Warfare and Society in the Barbarian West, 450-900. London: Routledge. ISBN 978-0-415-23940-0.
- Happé, Peter (2003). "A Guide to Criticism of Medieval English Theatre". In Beadle, Richard (ed.). The Cambridge Companion to Medieval English Theatre. Cambridge, UK: Cambridge University Press. ISBN 978-0-521-45916-7.
- Hicks, Michael (2012). The Wars of the Roses. New Haven and London: Yale University Press. ISBN 978-0-300-18157-9.
- Hillaby, Joe (2003). "Jewish Colonisation in the Twelfth Century". In Skinner, Patricia (ed.). The Jews in Medieval Britain: Historical, Literary, and Archaeological Perspectives. Woodbridge, UK: Boydell Press. ISBN 978-0-85115-931-7.
- Hooper, Nicholas (1992a). "The Housecarls in England in the Eleventh Century". In Strickland, Matthew (ed.). Anglo-Norman Warfare. Woodbridge, UK: Boydell Press. ISBN 0-85115-327-5.
- Hooper, Nicholas (1992b). "Some Observations on the Navy in Late Anglo-Saxon England". In Strickland, Matthew (ed.). Anglo-Norman Warfare. Woodbridge, UK: Boydell Press. ISBN 0-85115-327-5.
- Hughes, Malcolm K.; Diaz, Henry F. (1997). "Was There a 'Medieval Warm Period', and if so, Where and When?". In Hughes, Malcolm K.; Diaz, Henry F. (eds.). The Medieval Warm Period. Dordrecht, the Netherlands: Kluwer Academic Publishers. ISBN 978-0-7923-2842-1.
- Humphrey, Chris (2001). "Time and Urban Culture in Late Medieval England". In Humphrey, Chris; Ormrod, W. M. (eds.). Time in the Medieval World. Woodbridge, UK: Boydell Press. ISBN 978-1-903153-08-6.
- Johns, Susan M. (2003). Noblewomen, Aristocracy and Power in the Twelfth-Century Anglo-Norman Realm. Manchester, UK: Manchester University Press. ISBN 0-7190-6305-1.
- Johnson, Matthew (2000). "Self-made men and the staging of agency". In Dobres, Marcia-Anne; Robb, John E. (eds.). Agency in Archaeology. London: Routledge. ISBN 978-0-415-20760-7.
- Jones, Dan (2010). Summer of Blood: The Peasants' Revolt of 1381. London: Harper Press. ISBN 978-0-00-721393-1.
- Jordan, William Chester (1997). The Great Famine: Northern Europe in the Early Fourteenth Century. Princeton, US: Princeton University Press. ISBN 978-0-691-05891-7.
- Kessler, Herbert L. (2004). Seeing Medieval Art. Toronto, Canada: University of Toronto Press. ISBN 978-1-55111-535-1.
- Kowalski, Maryanne (2007). "Warfare, Shipping, and Crown Patronage: The Economic Impact of the Hundred Years War on the English Port Towns". In Armstrong, Lawrin; Elbl, Ivana; Elbl, Martin (eds.). Money, Markets and Trade in Late Medieval Europe: Essays in Honour of John H. A. Munro. Leiden, the Netherlands: BRILL. ISBN 978-1-84383-340-6.
- Lavelle, Ryan (2010). Alfred's Wars: Sources and Interpretations of Anglo-Saxon Warfare in the Viking Age. Woodbridge, UK: Boydell Press. ISBN 978-1-84383-569-1.
- Morillo, Stephen (1994). Warfare Under the Anglo-Norman Kings 1066–1135. Woodbridge, UK: Boydell Press. ISBN 978-0-85115-689-7.
- Mortimer, Ian (2004). The Greatest Traitor: The Life of Sir Roger Mortimer, Ruler of England 1327–1330. London: Pimlico Press. ISBN 978-0-7126-9715-6.
- Normore, Calvin G. (1999). "Some Aspects of Ockham's Logic". In Spade, Paul Vincent (ed.). The Cambridge Companion to Ockham. Cambridge, UK: Cambridge University Press. ISBN 978-0-521-58790-7.
- Ortenberg, Veronica (2006). In Search of The Holy Grail: The Quest for the Middle Ages. London: Hambledon Continuum. ISBN 978-1-85285-383-9.
- Page, Christopher (1997). "The English a capella Heresy". In Knighton, Tess; Fallows, David (eds.). Companion to Medieval and Renaissance Music. Berkeley and Los Angeles, US: University of California Press. ISBN 978-0-520-21081-3.
- Prestwich, J. O. (1992b). "War and Finance in the Anglo-Norman State". In Strickland, Matthew (ed.). Anglo-Norman Warfare. Woodbridge, UK: Boydell Press. ISBN 0-85115-327-5.
- Rahtz, Philip; Watts, Lorna (2005). "Three Ages of Conversion at Kirkdale, North Yorkshire". In Carver, Martin (ed.). The Cross Goes North: Processes of Conversion in Northern Europe, AD 300-1300. Woodbridge, UK: Boydell Press. ISBN 9781843831259.
- Ramsay, Nigel (2001). "Introduction". In Blair, John; Ramsay, Nigel (eds.). English Medieval Industries: Craftsmen, Techniques, Products. London: Hambledon Press. ISBN 978-1-85285-326-6.
- Rose, Susan (2002). Medieval Naval Warfare, 1000–1500. London: Routledge. ISBN 978-0-415-23976-9.
- Sawyer, P. H. (1982). Kings and Vikings: Scandinavia and Europe, AD 700-1100. London: Routledge. ISBN 978-0-415-04590-2.
- Skinner, Patricia (2003). "Introduction: Jews in Medieval Britain and Europe". In Skinner, Patricia (ed.). The Jews in Medieval Britain: Historical, Literary, and Archaeological Perspectives. Woodbridge, UK: Boydell Press. ISBN 978-0-85115-931-7.
- Spade, Paul Vincent (1999). "Ockham's Nominalist Metaphysics: Some Main Themes". In Spade, Paul Vincent (ed.). The Cambridge Companion to Ockham. Cambridge, UK: Cambridge University Press. ISBN 978-0-521-58790-7.
- Thomas, Hugh M. (2003). The English and the Normans: Ethnic Hostility, Assimilation, and Identity, 1066-c.1220. Oxford, UK: Oxford University Press. ISBN 978-0-19-925123-0.
- Timmons, Daniel (2000). "Introduction". In Clark, George; Timmons, Daniel (eds.). J.R.R. Tolkien and His Literary Resonances: Views of Middle-Earth. Westport, US: Greenwood Press. ISBN 978-0-313-30845-1.
- Turner, Hilary L. (1971). Town Defences in England and Wales. London: John Baker. OCLC 463160092.
- Tyerman, Christopher (1996). England and the Crusades, 1095–1588. Chicago, US: University of Chicago Press. ISBN 978-0-226-82013-2.
- Webb, Diana (2000). Pilgrimage in Medieval England. London: Hambledon. ISBN 978-1-85285-250-4.
- Webster, Leslie (2003). "Encrypted Visions: Style and Sense in the Anglo-Saxon Minor Arts, AD 400-900". In Karkov, Catherine E.; Hardin Brown, George (eds.). Anglo-Saxon Styles. New York, US: State University of New York. ISBN 978-0-7914-5869-3.
- Williams, Gareth (2001). "Military Institutions and Royal Power". In Brown, Michelle P.; Farr, Carol Ann (eds.). Mercia: An Anglo-Saxon Kingdom In Europe. London: Continuum. ISBN 978-0-8264-7765-1.
- Yorke, Barbara (1995). Wessex in the Early Middle Ages. London: Leicester University Press. ISBN 978-0-7185-1856-1.

=== Historiography ===
- D'haen, Theo (2004). "Stalking Multiculturalism: Historical Sleuths at the end of the Twentieth Century". In Bak, Hans (ed.). Uneasy Alliance: Twentieth-Century American Literature, Culture and Biography. Amsterdam, the Netherlands: Rodopi. ISBN 978-90-420-1611-8.
- Redknap, Mark (2002). Re-Creations: Visualising Our Past. Cardiff, UK: National Museums and Galleries of Wales and Cadw. ISBN 978-0-7200-0519-6.
- Sreedharan, E. (2004). A Textbook of Historiography, 500 B.C. to A.D. 2000. Hyderabad, India: Orient Longman. ISBN 978-81-250-2657-0.
