= St Helen's Church, North Thoresby =

Church in North Thoresby, Lincolnshire, England

Coordinates: 53°28′11″N 0°03′29″W

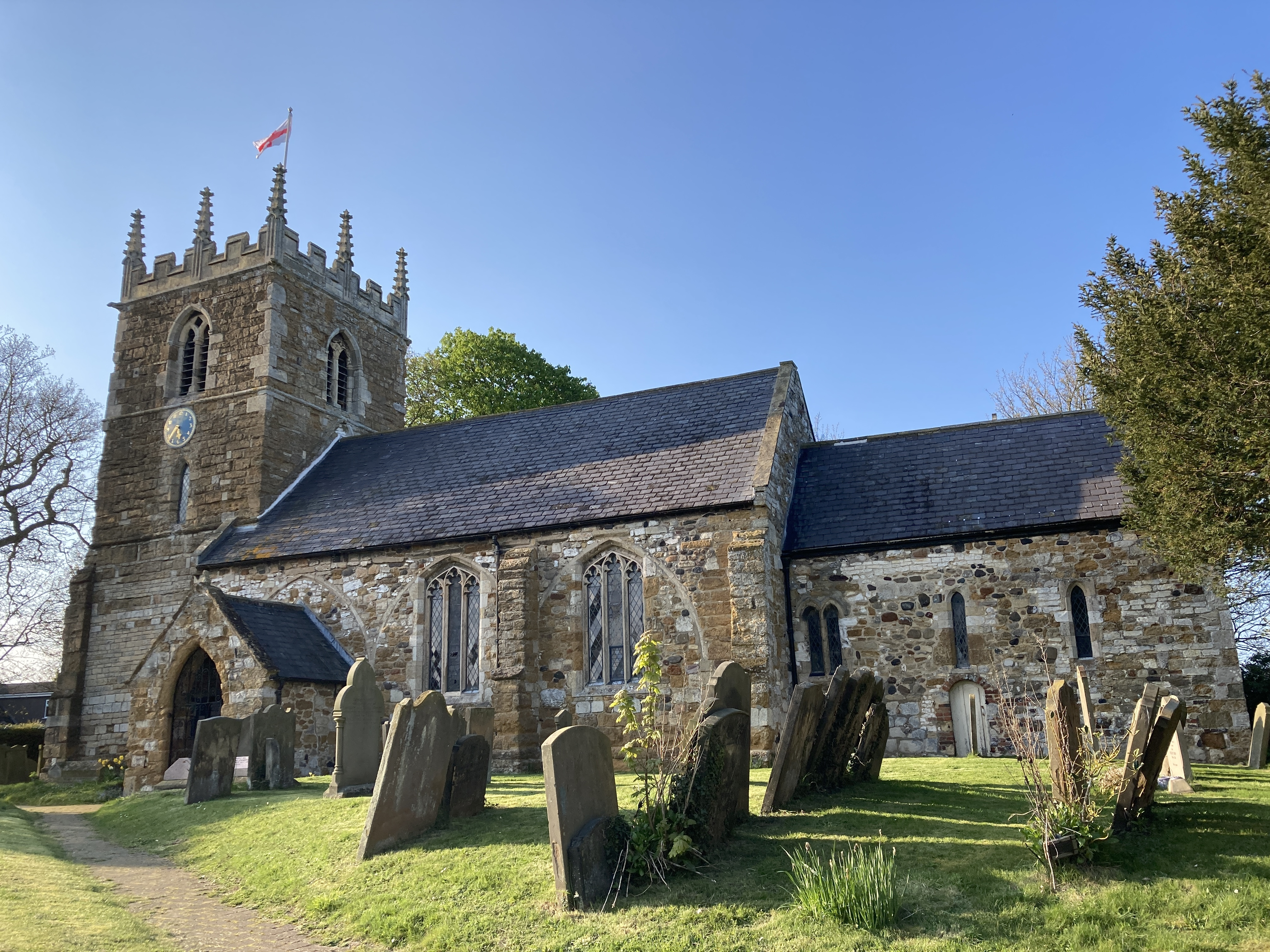
The Church of St Helen in North Thoresby

St Helen's Church is the Anglican parish church in the village of North Thoresby in Lincolnshire, England. Built of squared limestone rubble, chalk and limestone coursed rubble, the church is a Grade II* listed building with diverse stonework dating from Saxon, Norman, and Elizabethan restorations.

== Design ==
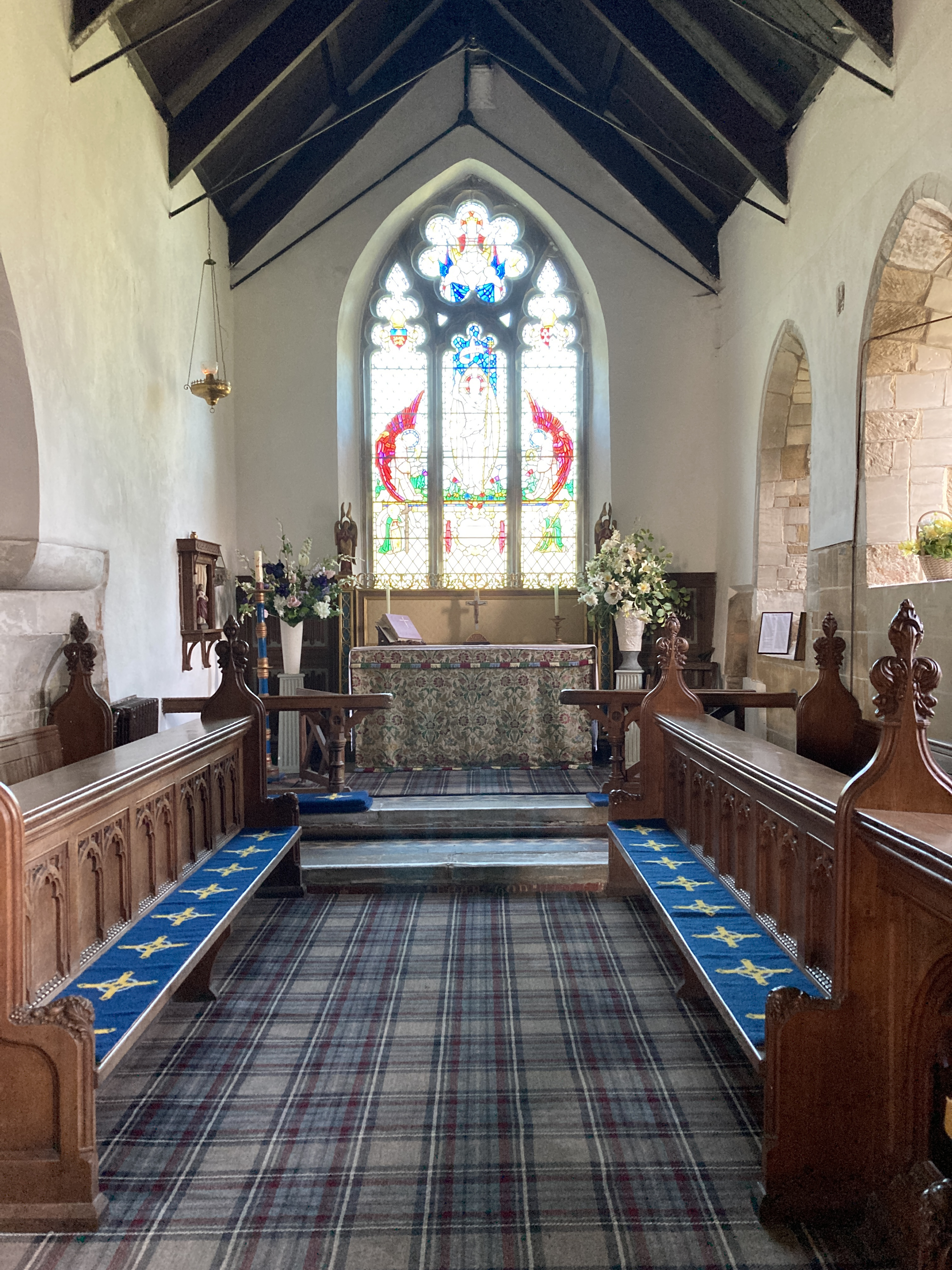
View from the nave towards the chancel

The church occupies a site where Christian worship has continued since Saxon times. Like most churches of its age it has seen many alterations from an original simple room to a 15th-century edifice with north and south aisles. The tower is in three stages with a 13th-century lancet window in the middle stage on the south side. Major restorations of the church took place in the 13th, 14th and 16th centuries and also in 1732 and 1903.

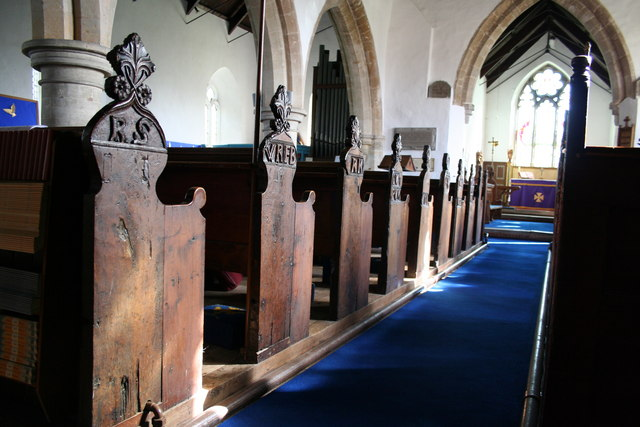
The unusual bench-ends in the church

The south aisle was demolished in Elizabethan times but remains of it survive inside the church. The church includes part of a Saxon grave cover, originally part of a Celtic cross, unusual early Tudor bench-ends with poppyheads featuring initials, possibly of churchwardens or their families and Restoration plaques which record the work tradesman such as "putty makers". On the wall above the chancel arch is mounted a Royal Charter of George I Coat of Arms dated 1722. There is also a memorial tablet to Francis Bond (1852–1918), the late 19th-century authority on Gothic architecture, who was born in the village.

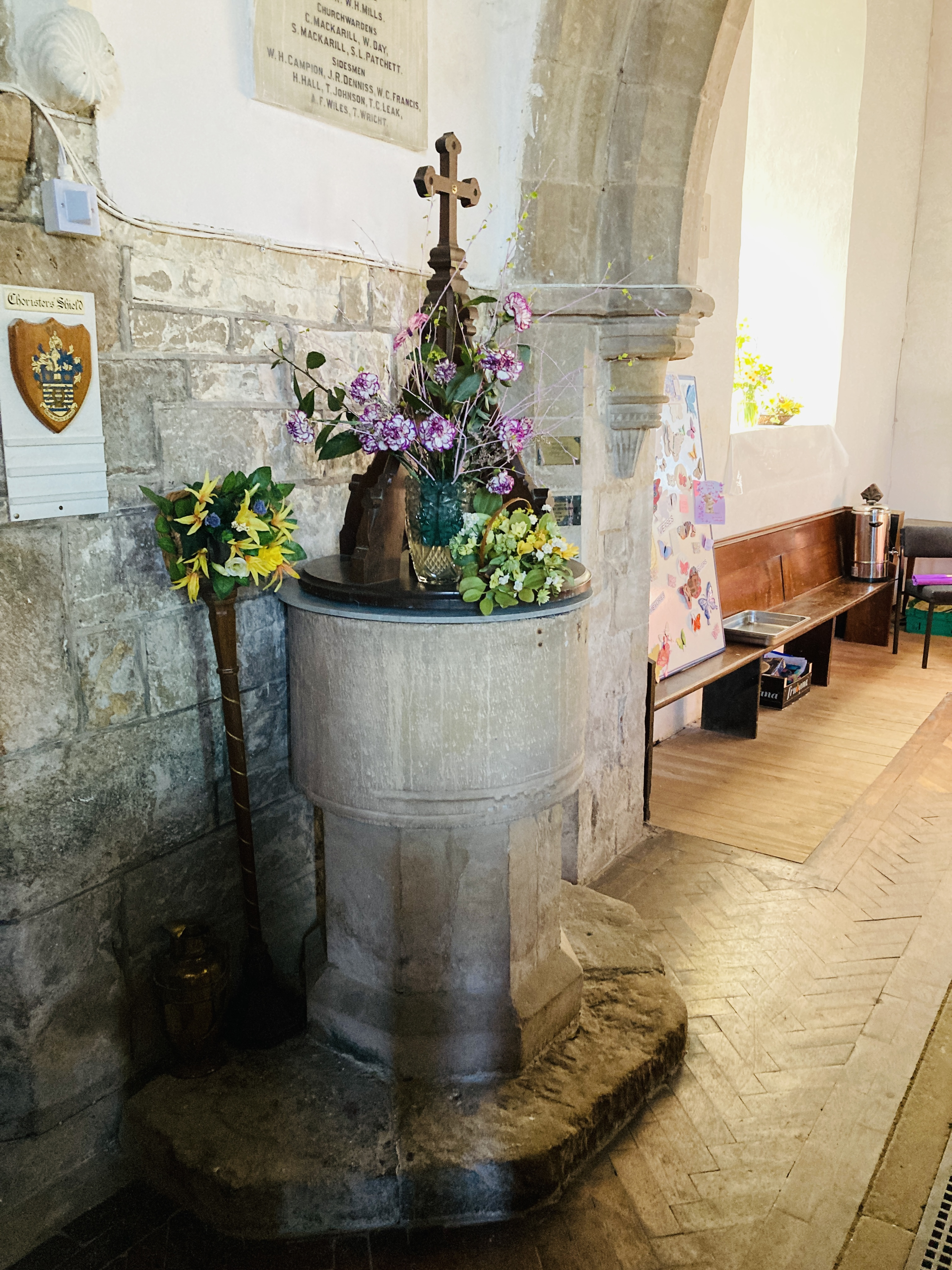
The baptismal font is 12th century Norman

In the south wall of the chancel is a trefoil headed 13th century piscina. The circular tub font is 12th century Norman, while the frontispiece hanging on the front of the children's altar is made from silk brocade which was used in Westminster Abbey during the coronation of Elizabeth II. Historically the parish was within Haverstoe, the south division of the Bradley-Haverstoe wapentake, in the North Riding of Lindsey. Today the church is in the Archdeaconry of Stow and Lindsey in the Diocese of Lincoln.

== Windows ==
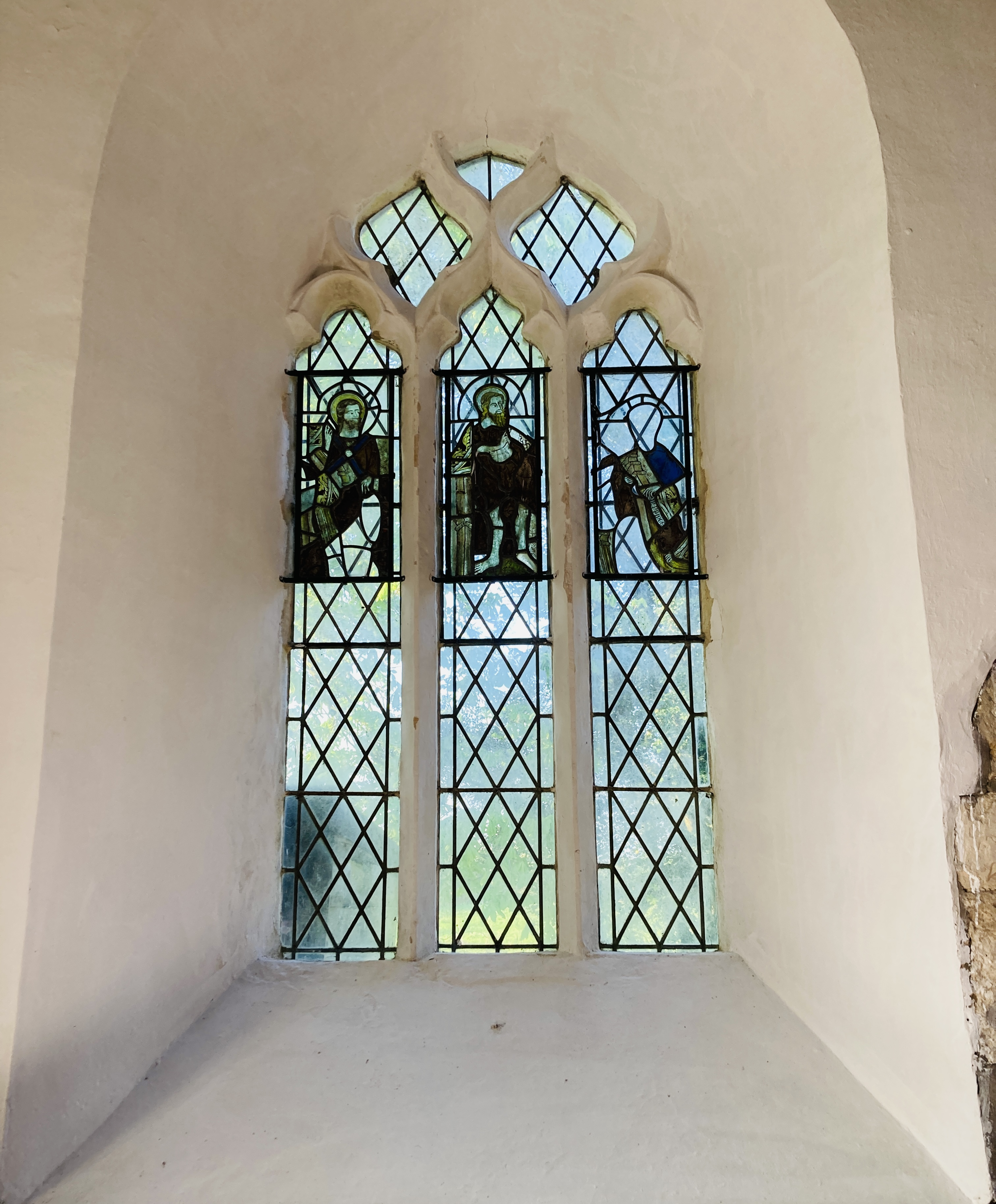
Fragments of Medieval glass

The small fragments of glass depicting figures now installed in the north-west window are 15th century and used to be in the East Window of the church until 1951 when the present East Window was put in as a war memorial, being dedicated by the Rt. Rev. Maurice Harland, Bishop of Lincoln. The West Window dates to the late 13th century with Y-tracery. Situated above this is a 16th-century embossed terracotta tile. The north wall contains two 14th-century windows with three lights and a recut late 13th-century window with intersecting tracery. A blocked doorway can also be seen.

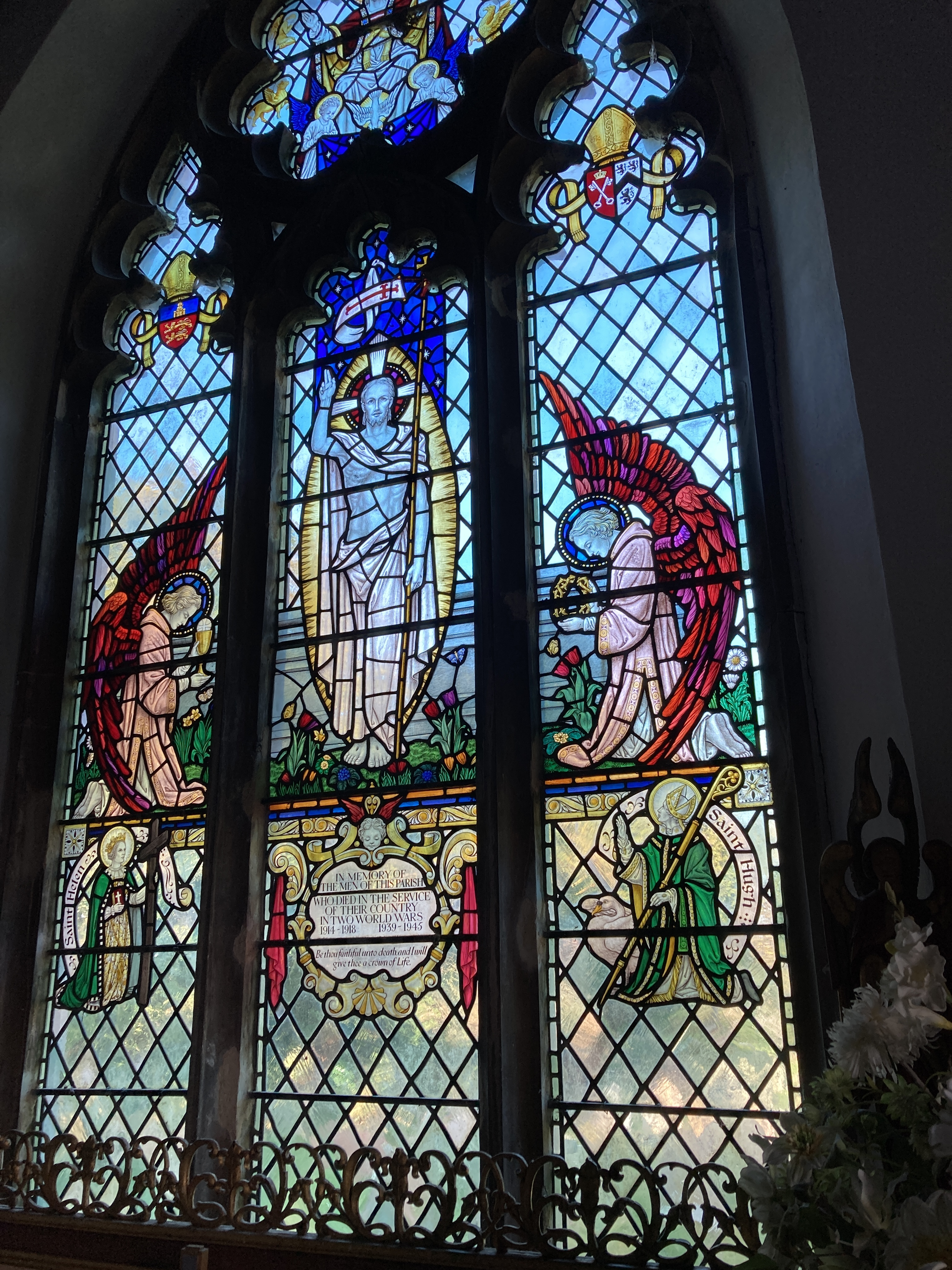
The East Window is dedicated to the dead from the village in the two World Wars

The East Window is mid-20th century with glass designed in a romantic/heroic style incorporating elements of mysticism, chivalry and patriotism of a fairly muted kind. There are four lights, one seven-lobed rose at the top and three decorated lancets beneath. The general theme is the Risen Christ who occupies the centre lancet beneath an ambiguous depiction which might be God the Father or another Risen Christ. The main figure is flanked by two seraphim, one holding the bread and wine of the Eucharist and the other holding the crown of thorns, both kneeling.

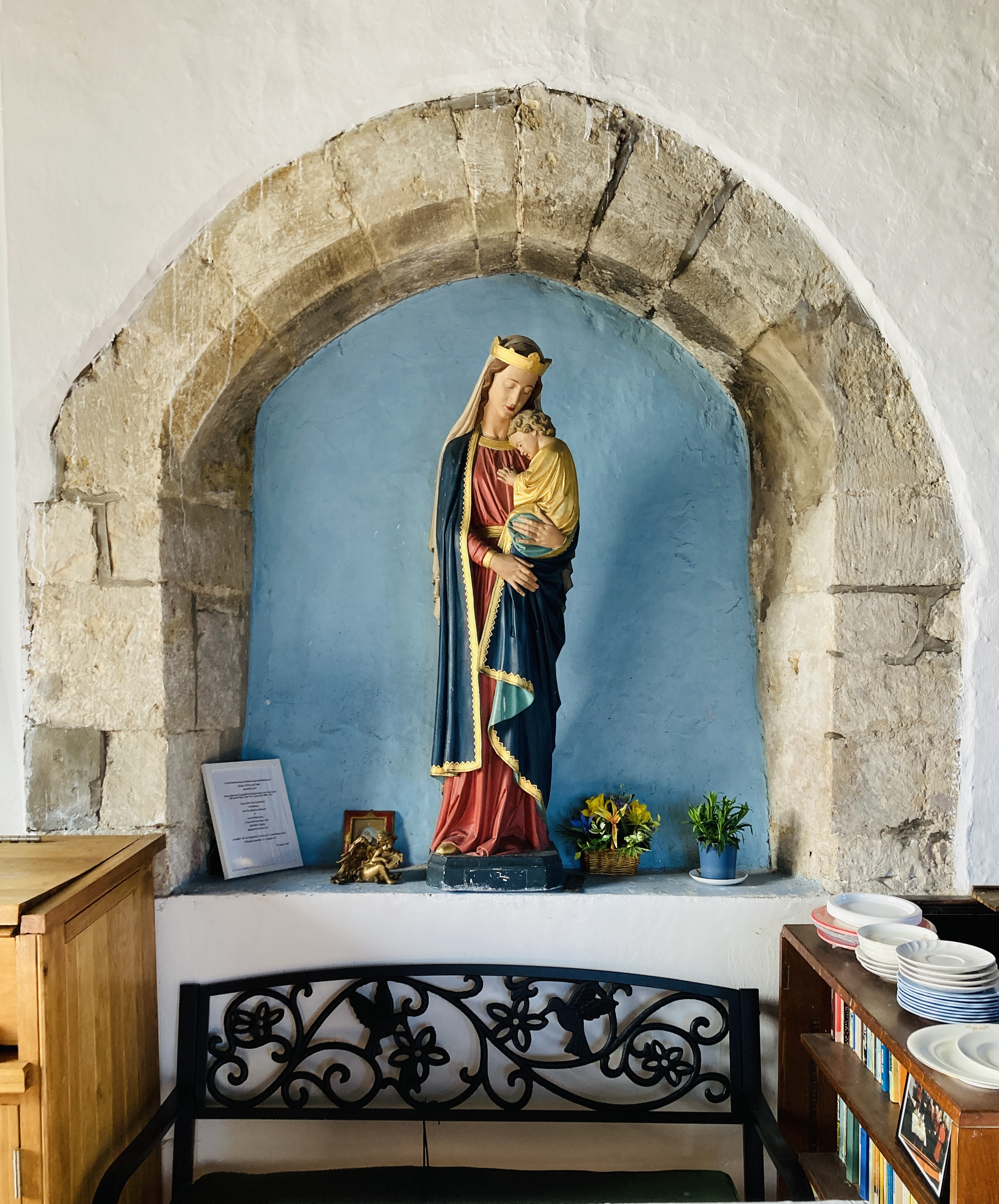
A bricked up 13th century doorway

Underneath there are depictions of St Helen, the patron of the church on the left and St Hugh of Lincoln, Lincoln's most revered bishop on the right. In between these two smaller figures there is an oval cartouche surmounted by a winged head and bearing the inscription "In memory of the men of this parish who died in the service of their country in two World Wars. Underneath there is a scallop shell (usually the symbol of St James). Swags on either side complete the decoration.
