= Francis Bond (architectural historian) =

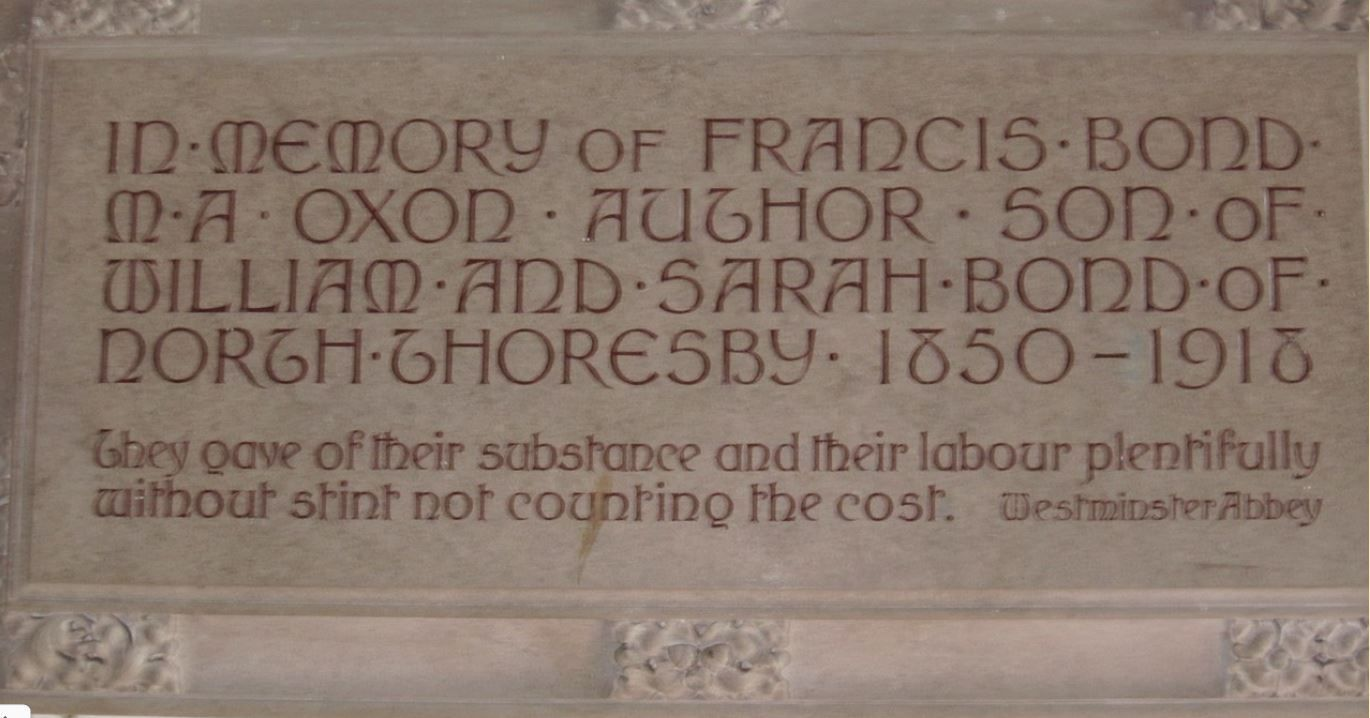
- Memorial plaque
- Born: 17 February 1850; Audby, North Thoresby, Lincolnshire, England
- Died: 3 February 1918 (aged 67); Croydon, Surrey, England
- Education: Lincoln College, Oxford
- Occupations: Schoolmaster, Architectural historian
- Notable work: Gothic Architecture in England (1905); Introduction to English Church Architecture (1913)
- Awards: Hon. A.R.I.B.A. F.G.S.

Francis Bond (17 February 1850 – 3 February 1918) was an English schoolmaster and architectural historian. He is best known for his scholarly classification of English Gothic architecture and for his extensive series of books on English church fittings, which remain standard references for ecclesiologists.

== Biography ==
=== Early life and education ===
Bond was born on 17 February 1850 in the hamlet of Audby, near North Thoresby, Lincolnshire. He was baptised at St Helen's Church on 10 November 1850. A plaque in the church commemorates him. Multiple sources are stating 1852 as a year of birth, contradicting the contemporary plaque.

His father died when Bond was nine years old, leaving his mother to care for him and his three younger siblings. The family subsequently moved to 173 Eastgate in Louth, where his uncle Francis lived. Bond was educated at King Edward's Grammar School in Louth.

In 1868, at the age of 18, he matriculated at Lincoln College, Oxford. During his studies, he spent time living with his widowed grandmother, Jane Bond, who ran a 110 acres (45 ha) farm in Tetney.

=== Teaching career ===
Following his university education, Bond pursued a career as a schoolmaster. By 1881, he was living and working in Hampstead, London. He served as a Classical Master at Christ's Hospital and later as Second Master at the Cowper Street Foundation School.

He eventually relocated to East Yorkshire to become the headmaster of the Hull and East Riding College. Between 1893 and 1914, Bond gave lectures, primarily on Gothic architecture, for the University of Oxford Delegacy for the Extension of Teaching.

== Personal life ==
Bond married his first wife, Marie Olive Berg of Denmark, on 15 May 1888 at the Danish Church on Osborne Street in Kingston upon Hull. They had one daughter. Marie Olive died in June 1889, shortly after childbirth.

Three years later, Bond married Ada Carr. They had three children:

- William Linskill (born 1893), who became a Consul in H.M. Consular Service.
- Charles Nesbitt (born 1894), who served in the Somerset Light Infantry and was killed in action at the Battle of the Somme in 1916.
- Marjorie (born 1896), who served in the Women's Voluntary Service.

Bond ceased publishing books in 1916 following the death of his son Charles. He died on 3 February 1918.

== Architectural history ==
Bond was considered a "more serious scholar" than his contemporary T. Francis Bumpus, though the historian David Watkin described his work as lacking the charm of Edward Schroeder Prior, possessing a "matter-of-fact" tone consistent with his background as a headmaster. He was elected an Honorary Associate of the Royal Institute of British Architects and a Fellow of the Geological Society of London.

His principal work, Gothic Architecture in England (1905), was a monumental analysis of church architecture from the Norman Conquest to the Dissolution of the Monasteries. In this work, Bond sought to overthrow the classification system established by Thomas Rickman—which divided English architecture into four distinct periods: Norman, Early English, Decorated, and Perpendicular—declaring that "there is no such thing". Instead, he aimed to treat the subject scientifically, in the manner of Eugène Viollet-le-Duc, and evolutionarily, in the sense of Charles Darwin. Bond viewed mediaeval architecture not as a series of styles with spiritual significance, but as a "single organic development" driven by structural necessities. Consequently, his studies dealt instead with parts of buildings such as the plan, the vault and its abutments, drainage, and lighting.

Bond was deeply distressed by what he perceived as the "blackness of indifference" toward architecture in Edwardian England, contrasting it unfavorably with the public enthusiasm for music and novels. He argued that this apathy was a departure from "old England," where "every village mason could build a church".

He edited and wrote the bulk of the "Church Art in England" series for Oxford University Press. His "immense industry" produced a continuous flow of books on mediaeval art with the Gothic Architecture in England in particular, while described by Watkin as "scarcely very readable," serves as "a very serious" reference book.

== Bibliography ==
Bond was a prolific writer on ecclesiastical architecture. His major works include:

- English Cathedrals Illustrated (1899)
- Gothic Architecture in England (London: B. T. Batsford, 1905)
- Screens and Galleries in English Churches (London: Oxford University Press, 1908)
- Fonts and Font Covers (London: Oxford University Press, 1908)
- Westminster Abbey (London: Oxford University Press, 1909)
- Visitors Guide to Westminster Abbey (1909)
- Misericords (London: Oxford University Press, 1910)
- Wood Carvings in English Churches (2 vols., London: Oxford University Press, 1910)
- Stalls and Tabernacle Work (London: Oxford University Press, 1910)
- The Cathedrals of England and Wales (London: B. T. Batsford, 1912)
- An Introduction to English Church Architecture from the Eleventh to the Sixteenth Century (2 vols., London: Oxford University Press, 1913)
- Dedications and Patron Saints of English Churches (London: Oxford University Press, 1914)
- The Chancel of English Churches (London: Oxford University Press, 1916)

== Sources ==
- Bond, Francis (1916). The Chancel of English Churches. London: Humphrey Milford, Oxford University Press.
- Crockett, Emily; Sorensen, Lee. "Bond, Francis". Dictionary of Art Historians. Duke University.
- "St Helen's Church". The North Chapel Parishes. 2007. Archived from the original on 12 March 2007.
- Watkin, David (1980). The Rise of Architectural History. London: Architectural Press. pp. 108–110. ISBN 0-85139-545-7.
- As of this edit, this article uses content from "Bond, Francis", authored by Emily Crockett and Lee Sorensen, which is licensed in a way that permits reuse under the Creative Commons Attribution-ShareAlike 4.0 International License, but not under the GFDL. All relevant terms must be followed.
