= Hull and East Riding College =

Location
- Park Street; Kingston upon Hull, East Riding of Yorkshire; England

Information
- Type: Proprietary school
- Opened: 1867
- Founder: Robert Jameson
- Closed: c. 1893
- Principals: Rev. William Lucas (1867–c. 1880); Francis Bond (1881–1890)
- Gender: Boys

The Hull and East Riding College was a proprietary school located on Park Street in Kingston upon Hull, East Riding of Yorkshire, England. Opened in 1867, the college was established to provide secondary education during a period of significant flux in the city's private school sector. It operated until the early 1890s, after which its buildings were occupied by the Hull Girls' High School.

== History ==
During the early 19th century, the secondary school sector in Hull was characterized by volatility and rapid turnover. As the port of Hull boomed in the 1830s, many small private schools were established, often competing with rivals in nearby Cottingham and Barton-upon-Humber. This competition nearly caused the extinction of the Hull Grammar School.

In 1836, two major schools were founded in an attempt to stabilize educational provision: Hull College, which was mixed denominational, and Kingston College, which was strictly Anglican. Despite initial success in the 1840s, both institutions eventually failed; Hull College closed in 1852, followed by Kingston College in 1859.

The Hull and East Riding College was opened in 1867 as a successor to these failed ventures. The initiative was led by Robert Jameson and other prominent businessmen who sought to establish the college as a limited liability company. Prior to opening, the founders planned to amalgamate the new institution with the Hull Grammar School. However, this scheme was defeated by the Charity Trustees, who insisted that ratepayers must retain the right to enter their sons into the new college, just as they had with the Grammar School.

Despite the shares not being fully subscribed, the college opened in 1867 with the Rev. William Lucas as principal. Jameson assumed much of the financial responsibility himself. The school struggled in its early years, running at a loss until 1873; student numbers were low, recorded as 94 in 1868 and dropping to 70 in 1870. Conditions subsequently improved, and although the directors remained financially anxious, the college became accepted as Hull's leading school. It was instrumental in raising academic standards in the city, introducing the Cambridge Local Examinations and restoring local links with the universities.

Around 1880, there was again strong local sentiment in favor of amalgamating the college with the Grammar School and utilizing funds from the Cogan's and Ferries' charities, although this scheme continued to face difficulties. The college eventually closed in the early 1890s. Its closure coincided with the bequest of Rev. John Hymers, which led to the foundation of Hymers College in 1893. Following the college's closure, the premises on Park Street became the site of the Hull Girls' High School.

== Architecture ==
The college building was situated on Park Street with a frontage of 130 feet (40 m). Designed by the architect R. G. Smith, the building was constructed in the Gothic style of the 13th-century period. The primary building material was red brick, with a main entrance located under a portico supported by low columns of Mansfield stone.

The interior featured a large assembly hall measuring 70 feet (21 m) by 40 feet (12 m). Various classrooms and masters' rooms branched off from the sides of this central hall.

== Key people ==
Robert Jameson, a prominent local businessman, was a key figure in the college's foundation and served as the chairman of the company. The first principal was the Rev. William Lucas, M.A., who was appointed upon the school's opening in 1867. The architectural historian Francis Bond served as headmaster from 1881 to 1890.

== Sources ==
- Allison, K. J., ed. (1969). A History of the County of York East Riding: Volume 1, The City of Kingston upon Hull. Victoria County History. London: Oxford University Press. pp. 353–355.
- Brock, Colin (2016). Education in the United Kingdom. London: Bloomsbury Publishing. ISBN 978-1474270601.
- Chambers's Encyclopaedia: A Dictionary of Universal Knowledge. Vol. 5. W. & R. Chambers. 1901.
- Lawson, John (1958). "Middle-Class Education in Later Victorian Hull". Studies in Education. 3 (1). University of Hull: 27–49.
- "Hull". The New Hull Guide. Hull: M. C. Peck and Son. 1880.
