= England in the High Middle Ages =

1066–1216 period in English history

- 1066–1216
Anglo-Saxon England	Late Middle Ages

In England, the High Middle Ages spanned the period from the Norman Conquest in 1066 to the death of King John, considered by some historians to be the last Angevin king of England, in 1216.

The disputed succession of the last Saxon king Edward the Confessor led to a Norman invasion, culminating in the victory in the Battle of Hastings of William of Normandy in 1066. This linked the Kingdom of England with Norman possessions in the Kingdom of France. By the time of William's death in 1087, England formed the largest part of an Anglo-Norman empire, though his succession led to a civil war known as the Anarchy.

The rule of Henry II of England saw a clash with the church that led to the murder of Archbishop Thomas Becket, while the later part of his reign was dominated by rebellions. His son Richard I of England acceded to the throne in 1189 and almost immediately departed on the Third Crusade. His younger brother John succeeded, but his behaviour led to rebellions that weakened Angevin control on the continent. His weakened position in England also resulted in the signing of Magna Carta with the country's barons, limiting royal power. His death in 1216 marked the end of the Angevin period and the beginning of the Plantagenet dynasty.

The Normans adopted many Anglo-Saxon governmental institutions, but the feudal system concentrated more power in the hands of the monarch and a small elite. The Normans also introduced an ecclesiastical hierarchy aligned closer to Rome. During the twelfth century divisions between conquerors and the English began to dissolve. England played a prominent role in the Second, Third and Fifth Crusades.

Between the ninth and thirteenth centuries England experienced the Medieval Warm Period, a prolonged period of warmer temperatures that allowed poorer land to be brought into cultivation. Agricultural land became typically organised around manors. By the eleventh century, a market economy was flourishing across much of England, while the eastern and southern towns were heavily involved in international trade. Many hundreds of new towns, some of them planned communities, were built, supporting the creation of guilds and charter fairs. The period has been used in a wide range of popular culture, including William Shakespeare's plays.

== Politics ==
=== Norman Conquest ===
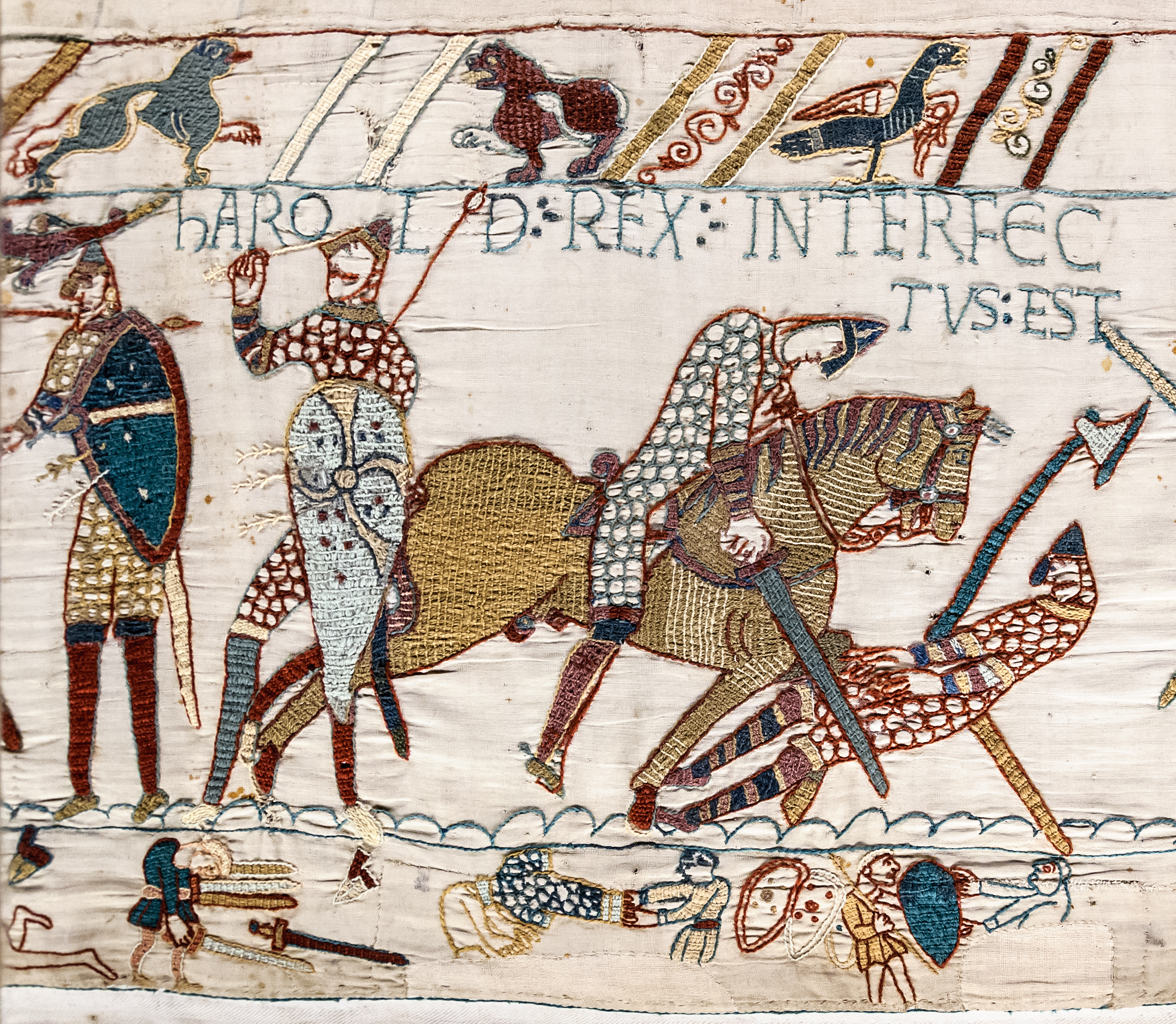
Section of the Bayeux Tapestry showing the final stages of the battle of Hastings

In 1002 King Æthelred II of England married Emma, the sister of Richard II, Duke of Normandy. Their son Edward the Confessor, who spent many years in exile in Normandy, succeeded to the English throne in 1042. This led to the establishment of a powerful Norman interest in English politics, as Edward drew heavily on his former hosts for support, bringing in Norman courtiers, soldiers, and clerics and appointing them to positions of power, particularly in the Church. Childless and embroiled in conflict with the formidable Godwin, Earl of Wessex, and his sons, Edward may also have encouraged Duke William of Normandy's ambitions for the English throne.

When King Edward died at the beginning of 1066, the lack of a clear heir led to a disputed succession in which several contenders laid claim to the throne of England. Edward's immediate successor was the Earl of Wessex, Harold Godwinson, the richest and most powerful of the English aristocrats. Harold was elected king by the Witenagemot of England and crowned by the Archbishop of York, Ealdred, although Norman propaganda claimed the ceremony was performed by Stigand, the uncanonically elected Archbishop of Canterbury. Harold was immediately challenged by two powerful neighbouring rulers. Duke William claimed that he had been promised the throne by King Edward and that Harold had sworn agreement to this. King Harald III of Norway, commonly known as Harald Hardrada, also contested the succession. His claim to the throne was based on an agreement between his predecessor Magnus I of Norway and English King Harthacnut, whereby if either died without heir the other would inherit both England and Norway. William and Harald at once set about assembling troops and ships to invade England. Tostig Godwinson, brother of Harold, made a series of attacks in the north of England in early 1066 that may have been the beginning of a bid for the throne, but after defeat at the hands of Edwin and Morcar and the desertion of most of his followers he threw his lot in with Harald Hardrada, who invaded northern England in early September. Harold defeated and killed Hardrada and Tostig at the Battle of Stamford Bridge. William invaded with an army of Norman followers and mercenaries. Harold marched south to meet him but was defeated and killed at the Battle of Hastings on 14 October, and William's forces rapidly occupied the south of England.

=== William I (1066–1087) ===
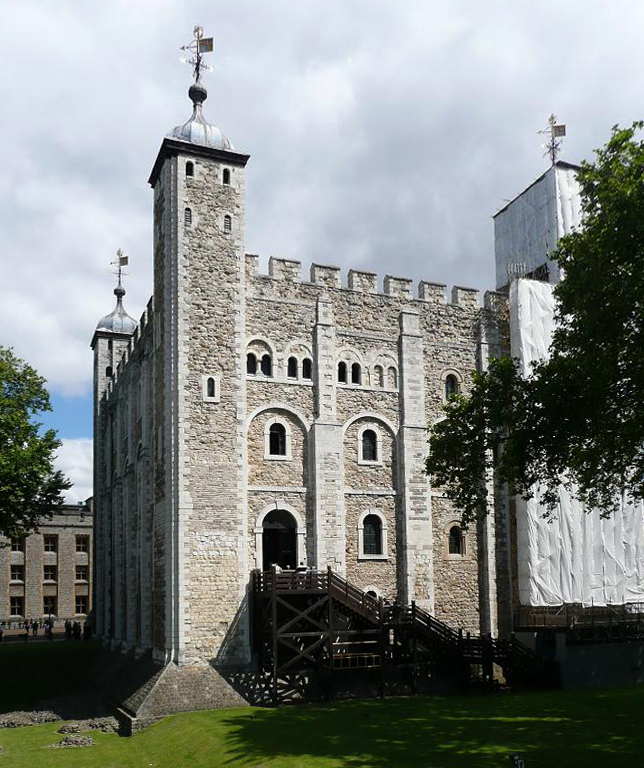
The Tower of London, originally constructed by William the Conqueror to control London.

Major revolts followed, which William suppressed before intervening in the north-east of England, establishing Norman control of York and devastating the region. Once England had been conquered, the Normans faced many challenges in maintaining control. They were few in number compared to the native English population; including those from other parts of France, historians estimate the number of Norman settlers at around 8,000. William's followers expected and received lands and titles in return for their service in the invasion, but William claimed ultimate possession of the land in England over which his armies had given him de facto control, and asserted the right to dispose of it as he saw fit. Henceforth, all land was "held" directly from the king in feudal tenure in return for military service. A Norman lord typically had properties located in a piecemeal fashion throughout England and Normandy, and not in a single geographic block.

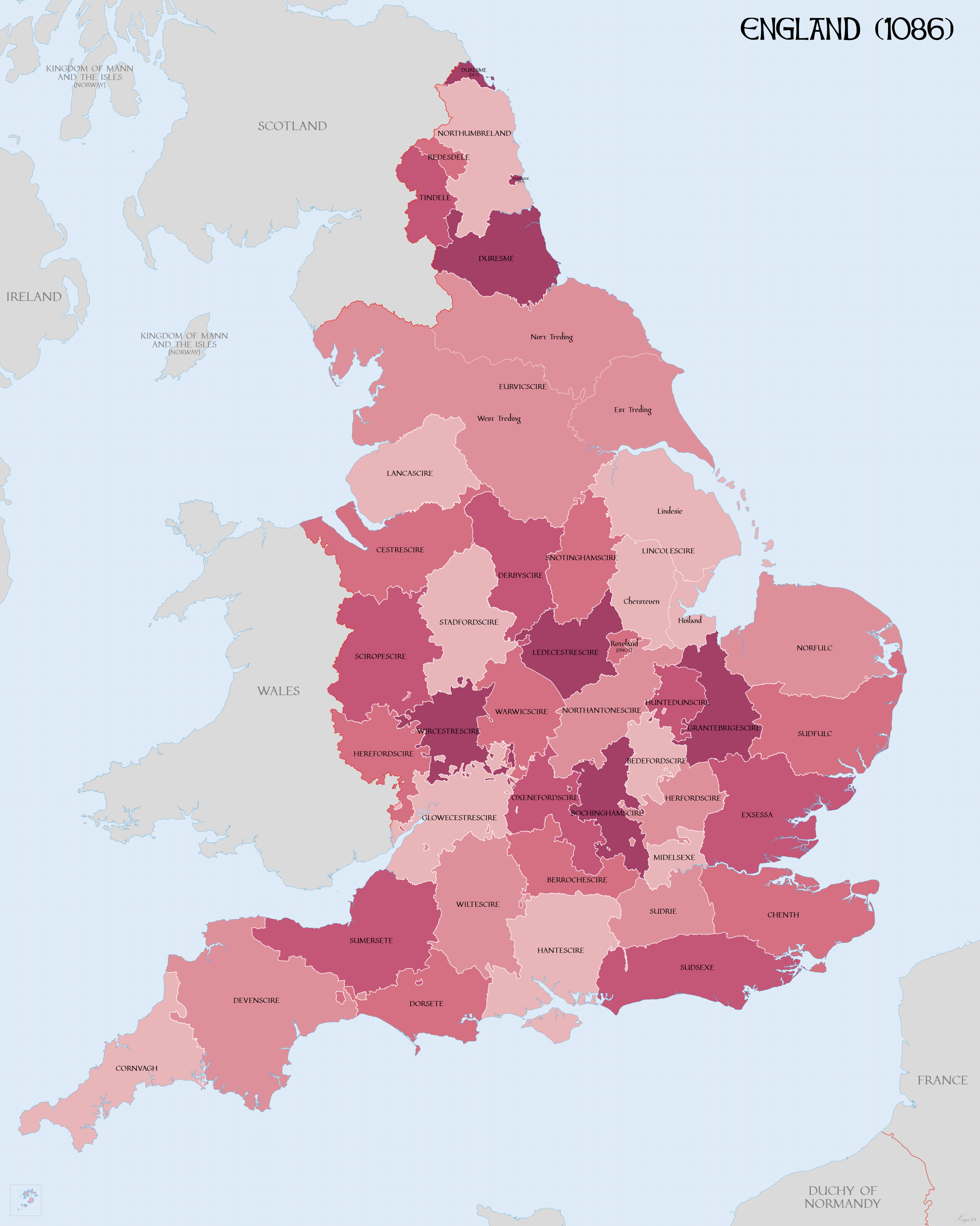
England in 1086 during the Domesday Survey

To find the lands to compensate his Norman followers, William initially confiscated the estates of all the English lords who had fought and died with Harold and redistributed part of their lands. These confiscations led to revolts, which resulted in more confiscations, a cycle that continued for five years after the Battle of Hastings. To put down and prevent further rebellions the Normans constructed castles and fortifications in unprecedented numbers, initially mostly on the motte-and-bailey pattern. William distributed lands to the Church and appointed loyal Normans as bishops; he and his barons also exercised tighter control over inheritance of property by widows and daughters, often forcing marriages to Normans. Some Norman lords used England as a launching point for attacks into South and North Wales, spreading up the valleys to create new Marcher territories. By the time of William's death in 1087, England formed the largest part of an Anglo-Norman empire, ruled over by a network of nobles with landholdings across England, Normandy, and Wales. England's growing wealth was critical in allowing the Norman kings to project power across the region, including funding campaigns along the frontiers of Normandy.

At Christmas 1085, William ordered the compilation of a survey of the landholdings held by himself and by his vassals throughout the kingdom, organised by counties, a work now known as the Domesday Book. The listing for each county gives the holdings of each landholder, grouped by owners. The listings describe the holding, who owned the land before the Conquest, its value, what the tax assessment was, and usually the number of peasants, ploughs, and any other resources the holding had. Towns were listed separately. All the English counties south of the River Tees and River Ribble are included, and the whole work seems to have been mostly completed by 1 August 1086, when the Anglo-Saxon Chronicle records that William received the results and that all the chief magnates swore the Salisbury Oath, a renewal of their oaths of allegiance.

=== William II (1087–1100) ===
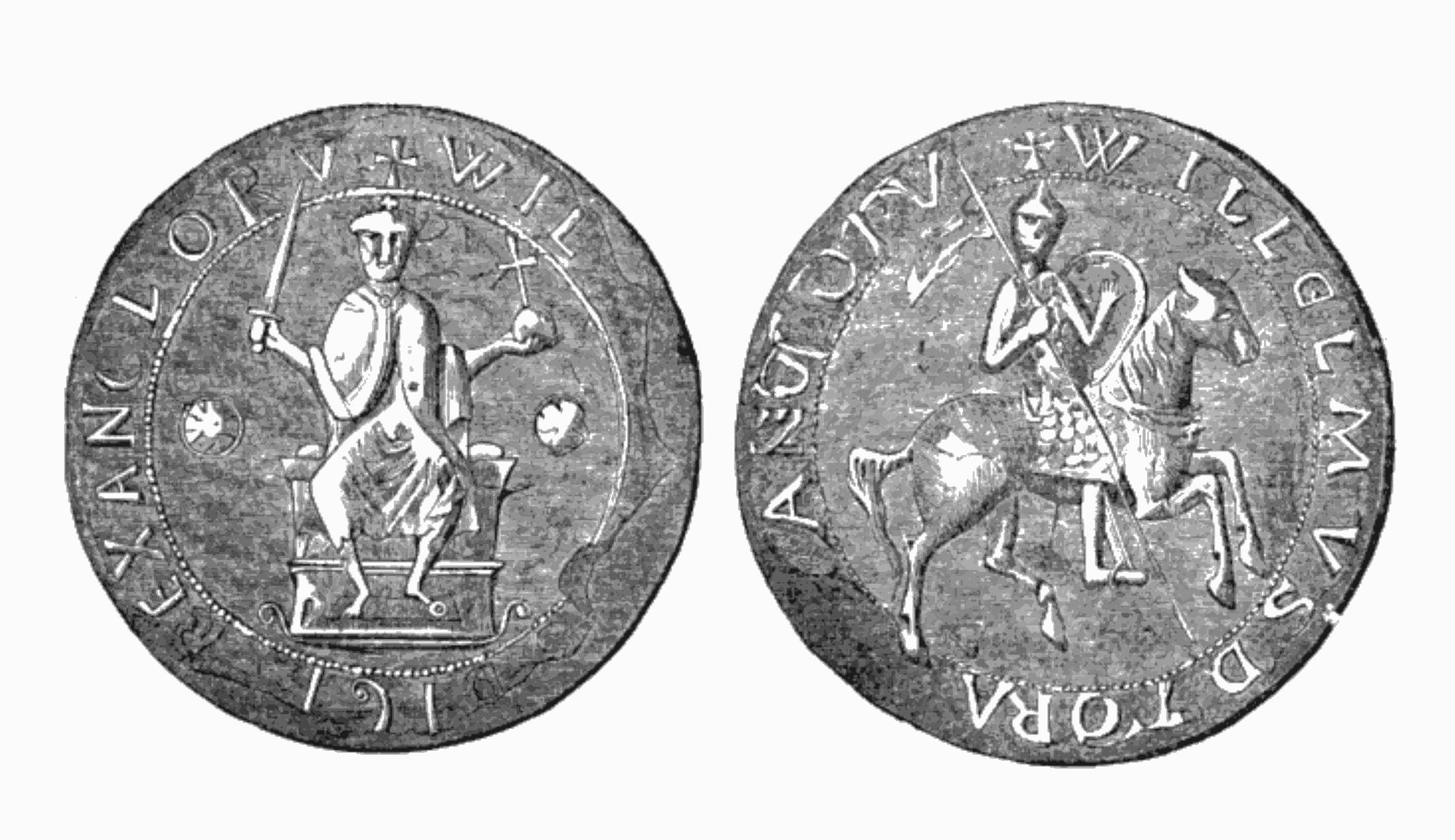
Great Seal of William II

At the death of William the Conqueror in 1087 his lands were divided into two parts. His Norman lands went to the eldest son Robert Curthose and his English lands to the younger William Rufus. This presented a dilemma for those nobles who held land on both sides of the waterway of the English Channel, who decided to unite England and Normandy once more under a singular ruler. The pursuit of this aim led them to revolt against William in favour of Robert in the Rebellion of 1088, under the leadership of the powerful Bishop Odo of Bayeux, who was a half-brother of William the Conqueror. As Robert failed to appear in England to rally his supporters, William won the support of the English lords with silver and promises of better government, and defeated the rebellion. In 1091 he invaded Normandy, crushing Robert's forces and forcing him to cede a portion of his lands. The two made up their differences and William agreed to help Robert recover lands lost to the King of France, notably Le Maine. This plan was later abandoned, but William continued to pursue a ferociously warlike defence of his French possessions and interests, exemplified by his response to the attempt by Elias de la Flèche, Count of Maine, to take Le Mans in 1099. William came into conflict with Anselm, Archbishop of Canterbury over Gregorian reforms in the Church. Eventually Anselm went into exile and Pope Urban II, involved in a major conflict with the Holy Roman Emperor Henry IV, came to a concordat with William, whereby William recognised Urban as pope, and Urban gave sanction to the Anglo-Norman ecclesiastical status quo. Anselm remained in exile, and William was able to claim the revenues of the archbishop of Canterbury to the end of his reign. William died while hunting in 1100.

=== Henry I (1100–1135) ===
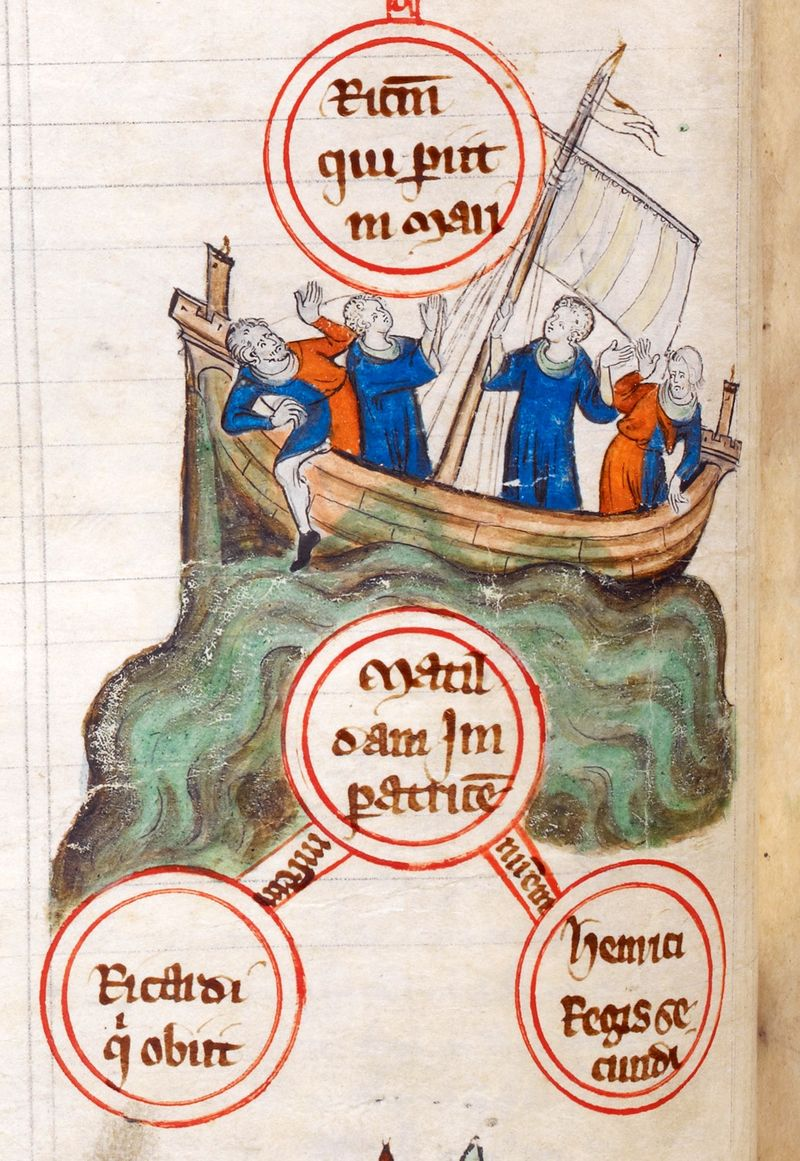
Early fourteenth-century depiction of the sinking of the White Ship on 25 November 1120

Despite Robert's rival claims, his younger brother Henry immediately seized power in England. Robert, who invaded in 1101, disputed Henry's control of England. This military campaign ended in a negotiated settlement that confirmed Henry as king. The peace was short-lived, and Henry invaded the Duchy of Normandy in 1105 and 1106, finally defeating Robert at the Battle of Tinchebray. Henry kept Robert imprisoned for the rest of his life. Henry's control of Normandy was challenged by Louis VI of France, Baldwin of Flanders and Fulk of Anjou, who promoted the rival claims of Robert's son, William Clito, and supported a major rebellion in the Duchy between 1116 and 1119. Following Henry's victory at the Battle of Brémule, a favourable peace settlement was agreed with Louis in 1120.

Considered by contemporaries to be a harsh but effective ruler, Henry skilfully manipulated the barons in England and Normandy. In England, he drew on the existing Anglo-Saxon system of justice, local government and taxation, but also strengthened it with additional institutions, including the royal exchequer and itinerant justices. Normandy was also governed through a growing system of justices and an exchequer. Many of the officials that ran Henry's system were "new men", relatively low-born individuals who rose through the ranks as administrators. Henry encouraged ecclesiastical reform, but from 1101 he also became embroiled in a serious dispute with Archbishop Anselm, which was resolved through a compromise solution in 1105. He supported the Cluniac order and played a major role in the selection of the senior clergy in England and Normandy.

=== Stephen, Matilda and the Anarchy (1135–1154) ===
Henry's only legitimate son, William, died aboard the White Ship in the disaster of 1120, sparking a fresh succession crisis. Henry named his daughter Matilda as his heir, but on Henry's death in 1135 her cousin Stephen of Blois had himself proclaimed king. Matilda's husband Geoffrey, Count of Anjou showed little interest in England, but he supported Matilda by entering Normandy to claim her inheritance. Matilda landed in England to challenge Stephen and was declared "Lady of the English", which resulted in a civil war called the Anarchy. Stephen was defeated and captured at the Battle of Lincoln (1141) and Matilda was the effective ruler. When Matilda was forced to release Stephen in a hostage exchange for her half-brother Robert, 1st Earl of Gloucester, Stephen was re-crowned. The conflict in England continued inconclusively. However, Geoffrey secured the Duchy of Normandy. Matilda's son, Henry II, by his marriage to Eleanor of Aquitaine had acquired the Duchy of Aquitaine and was now immensely rich. With skilful negotiation with the war-weary barons of England and King Stephen, he agreed to the Treaty of Wallingford and was recognised as Stephen's heir.

=== Henry II (1154–1189) ===
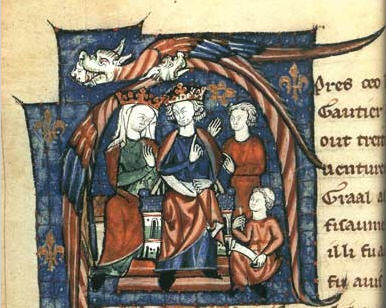
Twelfth-century depiction of Henry II and Eleanor of Aquitaine holding court

After Stephen's death in 1154 Henry succeeded as the first Angevin king of England, so-called because he was also the Count of Anjou in Northern France, adding it to his extensive holdings in Normandy and Aquitaine. England became a key part of a loose-knit assemblage of lands spread across Western Europe, later termed the Angevin Empire.

Henry asserted his authority over Brittany, even reorganising the Duchy into eight administrative districts and introducing Angevin legal reforms. He pursued an aggressive policy in Wales, reclaiming lands lost by Anglo-Norman princes and conducting four punitive campaigns against Welsh princes that resulted in their submission to his authority. This underlined his overlordship, but he did not attempt a direct conquest. When the Scottish king William the Lion joined the rebellion of Henry's sons and was captured, it allowed Henry to extract homage from the Scottish king under the Treaty of Falaise (1174), which he did not pursue directly, but which would provide a justification for later interventions in Scottish kingship.

In the mid-twelfth century Ireland was ruled by local kings, although their authority was more limited than their counterparts in the rest of western Europe. The deposed King of Leinster, Diarmait Mac Murchada, turned to Henry for assistance in 1167; Henry allowed Diarmait to recruit mercenaries within his empire. Diarmait put together a force of Anglo-Norman and Flemish mercenaries drawn from the Welsh Marches, including Richard de Clare, known as Strongbow. With his new supporters, he reclaimed Leinster but died shortly afterwards in 1171; de Clare then claimed Leinster for himself. Henry took this opportunity to intervene personally in Ireland, landing in October 1171. Henry's timing was influenced by several factors, including encouragement from Pope Alexander, who saw the opportunity to establish papal authority over the Irish church. Henry's intervention was initially successful, with both the Irish and Anglo-Normans in the south and east of Ireland accepting his rule. However, the Treaty of Windsor in 1175, under which Rory O'Connor would be recognised as the High King of Ireland, giving homage to Henry and maintaining stability on the ground on his behalf, meant that he had little direct control.

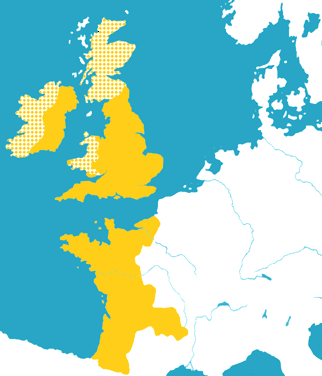
The extent of the Angevin Empire around 1172; solid yellow shows Angevin possessions, checked yellow Angevin hegemony

Henry saw an opportunity to re-establish what he saw as his rights over the Church in England by reasserting the privileges held by Henry I when Theobald, Archbishop of Canterbury, died, by appointing his friend, Thomas Becket to the post. Henry had clashed with the church over whether bishops could excommunicate royal officials without his permission and whether he could try clerics without them appealing to Rome. However, Becket opposed Henry's Constitutions of Clarendon and fled into exile. Relations later improved, allowing Becket's return, but soon soured again when Becket saw the crowning as coregent of Henry's son by the Archbishop of York as a challenge to his authority and excommunicated those who had offended him. On hearing the news Henry uttered the infamous phrase "what miserable drones and traitors have I nurtured and promoted in my household who let their lord be treated with such shameful contempt by a low born clerk". Trying to please Henry, four knights murdered Becket in Canterbury Cathedral. Following widespread outrage directed at him over Becket's 1170 murder, Henry performed public penances in Normandy in 1172 and in Canterbury Cathedral in 1174. Henry would later exploit the popular veneration of Becket.

When Henry II attempted to give his land-less youngest son, John, a wedding gift of three castles it prompted his three eldest sons and wife to rebel in the revolt of 1173–1174. Louis VII encouraged the three elder sons to destabilise his mightiest subject and not to wait for their inheritances. It was only after eighteen months of conflict that Henry II was able to force the rebels to submit to his authority. In Le Mans in 1182 Henry II gathered his children to plan for partible inheritance in which his eldest son, also called Henry, would inherit England, Normandy and Anjou; Richard the Duchy of Aquitaine; Geoffrey Brittany and John would receive Ireland. This broke down into further conflict and the younger Henry rebelled again, but died of dysentery. In 1186 Geoffrey died as a result of a tournament accident but Henry was still reluctant to have a sole heir so, in 1189, Richard and Philip II of France took advantage of a sickening Henry II with more success. Henry II was forced to accept humiliating peace terms, including naming Richard as sole heir. When Henry II died shortly afterwards his last words to Richard were allegedly "God grant that I may not die until I have my revenge on you".

=== Richard I (1189–1199) ===
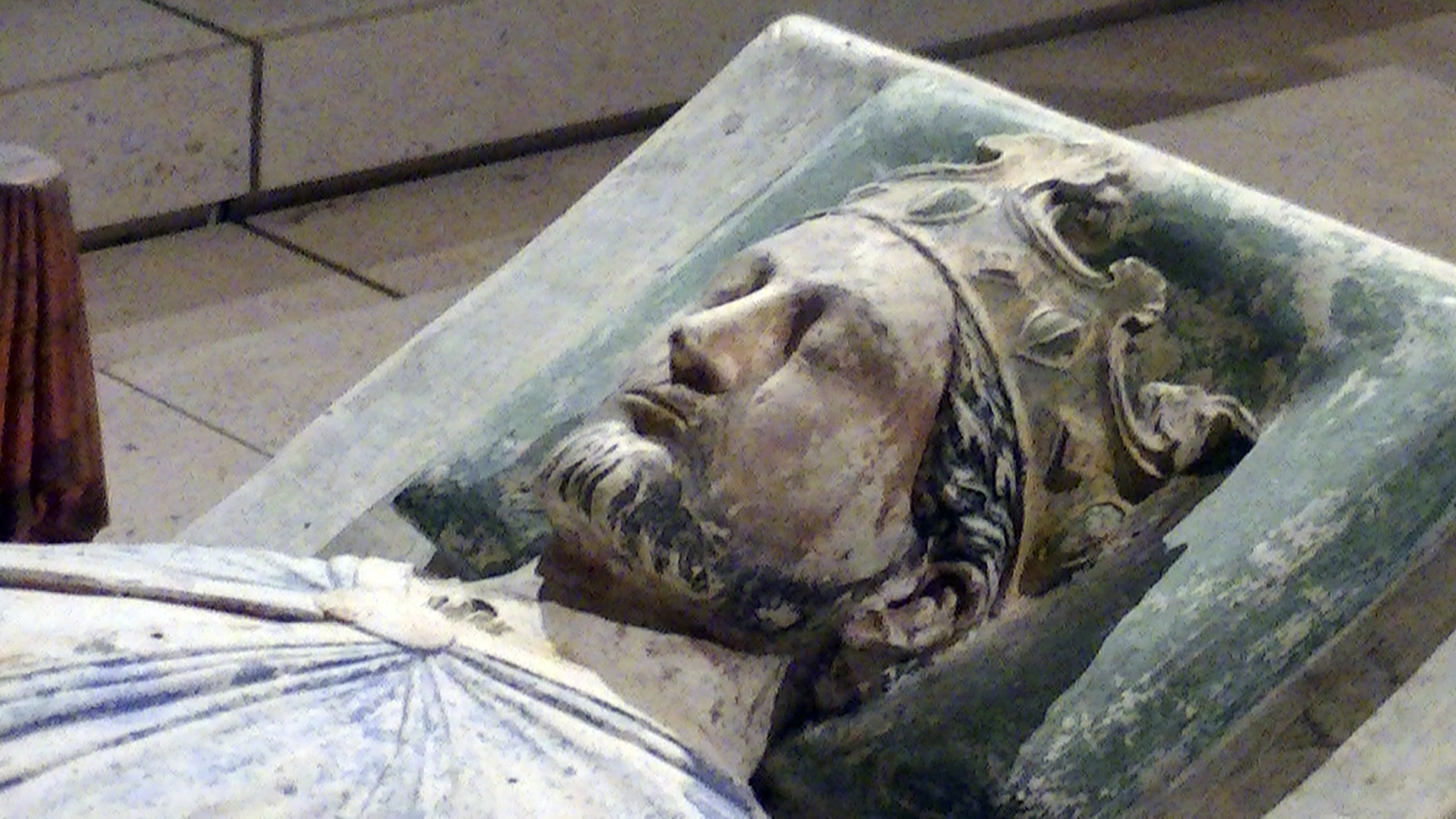
The effigy of Richard I at Fontevraud Abbey, Anjou

On the day of Richard's coronation there was a mass slaughter of the Jews, described by Richard of Devizes as a "holocaust". Quickly putting the affairs of the Angevin Empire in order he departed on Crusade to the Middle East in early 1190. In Sicily he came into conflict with Tancred I over the rights of Richard's sister Queen Joan, widow of the former king William II of Sicily. Richard captured the city of Messina on 4 October 1190 and using it to force Tancred into a peace agreement. When his sister and his fiancée Berengaria along with several other ships, including the treasure ship were seized by the island's despot Isaac Komnenos, Richard conquered the island, which became a western feudal and Christian base in the Mediterranean.

Opinions of Richard amongst his contemporaries were mixed. He had rejected and humiliated the king of France's sister; insulted and refused spoils of the Third Crusade to nobles like Leopold V, Duke of Austria, and was rumoured to have arranged the assassination of Conrad of Montferrat. His cruelty was demonstrated by his massacre of 2,600 prisoners in Acre. However, Richard was respected for his military leadership and courtly manners. He achieved victories in the Third Crusade but failed to capture Jerusalem, retreating from the Holy Land with a small band of followers.

Richard was captured by Leopold on his return journey in 1192. Custody was passed to Henry the Lion and a tax of 25 per cent of movables and income was required in England to pay the ransom of 100,000 marks, with a promise of 50,000 more, before Richard was released in 1194. In his absence Philip II of France had overrun much of Normandy, while John of England controlled much of the remainder of Richard's lands. On his return to England, Richard forgave John and re-established his control. Leaving England in 1194 never to return, Richard battled Phillip for the next five years for the return of the holdings seized during his incarceration. Close to total victory he was injured by an arrow during the siege of Château de Châlus-Chabrol and died after lingering injured for ten days.

=== John (1199–1216) ===
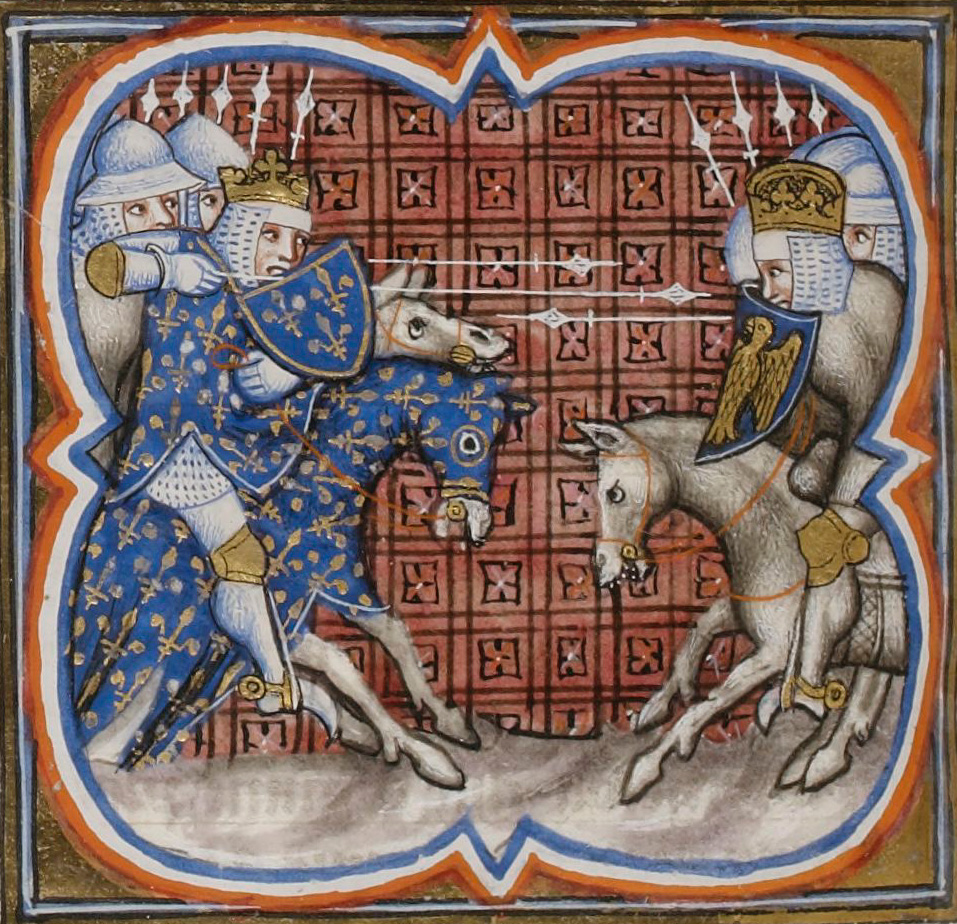
The French victory at the battle of Bouvines doomed John's plan to retake Normandy in 1214 and led to the First Barons' War

Richard's failure in his duty to provide an heir caused a succession crisis. Anjou, Brittany, Maine and Touraine chose Richard's nephew and nominated heir Arthur, while John succeeded in England and Normandy. Yet again Philip took the opportunity to destabilise the Plantagenet territories on the European mainland, supporting his vassal Arthur's claim to the English crown. When Arthur's forces threatened his mother, John won a significant victory, capturing the entire rebel leadership at the Battle of Mirebeau. Arthur was murdered (it was rumoured by John's own hands), and Arthur's Eleanor spent the rest of her life in captivity. John's behaviour drove numerous French barons to side with Phillip. The resulting rebellions by the Norman and Angevin barons broke John's control of the continental possessions, leading to the de facto end of the Angevin Empire, even though Henry III would maintain the claim until 1259.

After re-establishing his authority in England, John planned to retake Normandy and Anjou. The strategy was to draw the French from Paris while another army, under Otto IV, Holy Roman Emperor, attacked from the north. However, his allies were defeated at the Battle of Bouvines in one of the most decisive and symbolic battles in French history. The battle had both important and high-profile consequences. John's nephew Otto retreated and was overthrown while John agreed to a five-year truce. Philip's decisive victory was crucial in ordering politics in both England and France. The battle was instrumental in forming the absolute monarchy in France.

John's defeats in France weakened his position in England. The rebellion of his English vassals resulted in the treaty called Magna Carta, which limited royal power and established common law. This would form the basis of every constitutional battle through the 13th and 14th centuries. However, both the barons and the crown failed to abide by the terms of Magna Carta, leading to the First Barons' War in which the rebel barons invited an invasion by Prince Louis. This is considered by some historians to mark the end of the Angevin period and the beginning of the Plantagenet dynasty with John's death and William Marshall's appointment as the protector of the nine-year-old Henry III. Marshall won the war with victories at the battles of Lincoln and Dover in 1217, leading to the Treaty of Lambeth by which Louis renounced his claims. In victory, the Marshal Protectorate reissued Magna Carta as a basis for future government.

=== Government ===
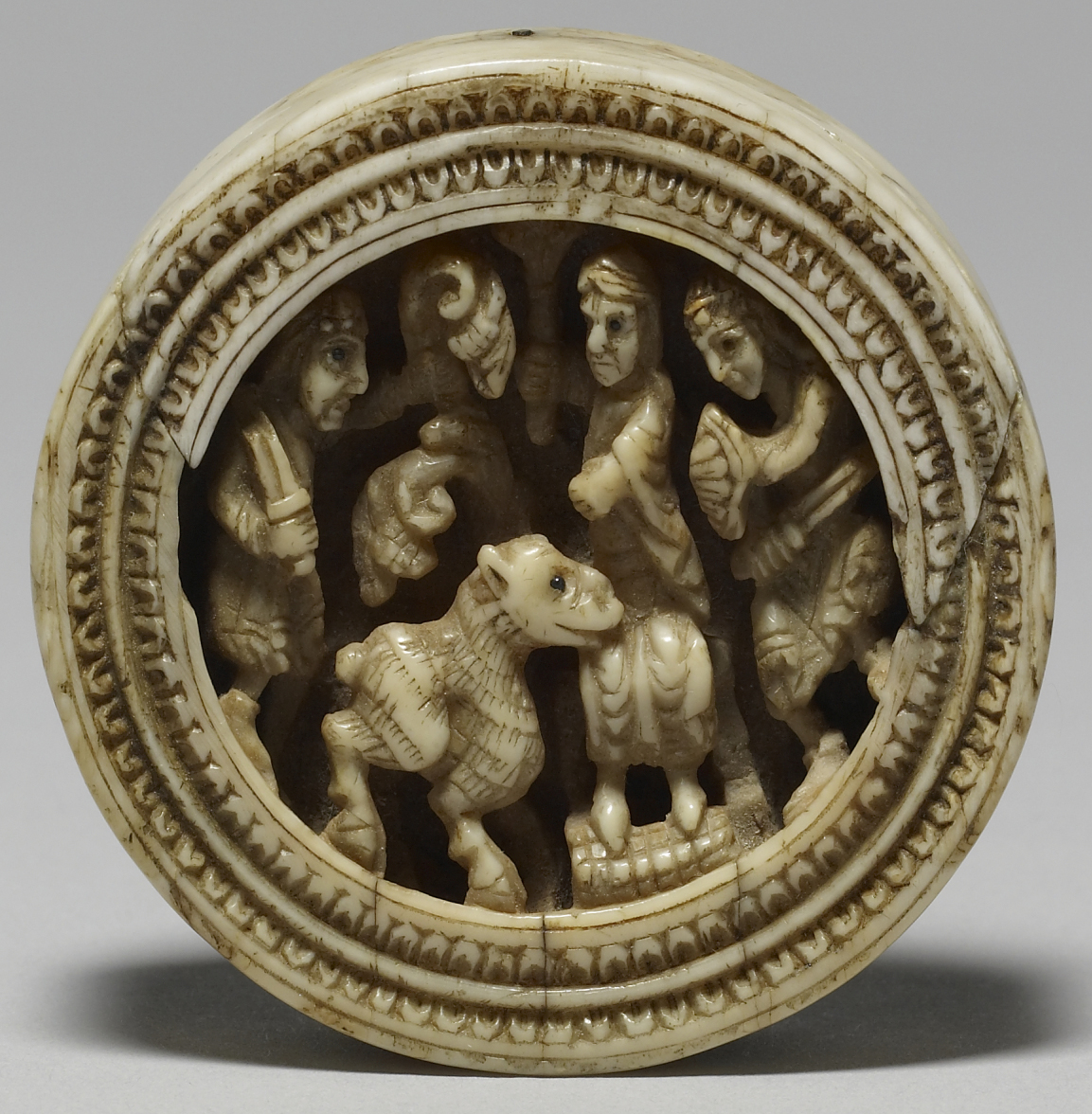
Anglo-Norman twelfth-century gaming piece, illustrating soldiers presenting a sheep to a figure seated on a throne

Within 20 years of the Norman Conquest, the Anglo-Saxon elite had been replaced by a new class of Norman nobility. The new earls (successors to the ealdermen), sheriffs and senior clergy were all drawn from their ranks. In many areas of society there was continuity, as the Normans adopted many of the Anglo-Saxon governmental institutions, including the tax system, mints and the centralisation of law-making and some judicial matters; initially sheriffs and the hundred courts continued to function as before.

Anglo-Saxon society was based on close-knit farming communities that were jointly responsible for maintaining law and order in the village. Land ownership was the basis of social order. The population consisted of different social classes, from free peasants (the ceorlas), who farmed their own land, to the thegns (nobles) and the royal elite. The ceorlas were free men who owned or rented land and managed their own farms. The land was divided into hides (hooves), agricultural units that served as a basis for taxation and recruitment. Every free man with land was obliged to pay taxes and perform military service. This was a more direct system than the Norman feudal system, where such duties were often passed down through a chain of vassals.

After the Conquest, the Normans brought with them a highly hierarchical and formalised feudal system that differed significantly from the Anglo-Saxon system. In the Norman feudal system, the king granted land (fiefs) to his vassals, who in turn passed on land to sub-vassals. The land was not regarded as personal property but as a loan from the king or a higher feudal lord. In return, the vassals had to provide military services and fulfil other obligations to their feudal lord. In contrast to the Anglo-Saxons who held slaves, the Normans rejected this practice as backward and contrary to the teachings of the Church. The once free peasants on the other hand, lost influence and power as the Normans linked land ownership more closely to the provision of labour services for the local lord. They fell down the economic hierarchy and increased the number of unfree serfs or villeins, who were forbidden to leave their estates or seek other employment.

Towards the end of Henry II's reign, the foundations of centralised power were so firmly established that they were not seriously threatened or even shaken at any later point. The work of Henry II and his advisors proved decisive in the long term. The institutions of central government underwent significant improvements and the rulers found ways and means to extend the power of the Crown in the area of justice. By 1189, the Court of Chancery and the Court of Exchequer had acquired a clear identity and independent functions. The Court of Chancery was headed by the Lord Chancellor, who supervised the drafting and issuing of deeds, documents and diplomatic correspondence and authenticated them by affixing the royal seal. King John extended the royal role in delivering justice, and the extent of appropriate royal intervention was one of the issues addressed in Magna Carta.

It was not until 1215 that the jury court made its appearance, after the Church had withdrawn its blessing from trial by ordeal. It was the royal judges who, apparently without any special instruction from the government, finally came up with the idea that if facts could generally be established by the sworn testimony of twelve lawful men from the neighbourhood, the fact of guilt could also be established in the same way. These and other changes introduced under Henry II mark an important stage in the gradual process by which the administration of justice became the sole prerogative of the king and the very origin of the common law.

Many tensions existed within the system of government.Royal landowning and wealth stretched across England, and placed the king in a privileged position above even the most powerful of the noble elite. Successive kings still needed more resources to pay for military campaigns, conduct building programmes, or to reward their followers, and this meant exercising their feudal rights to interfere in the land-holdings of nobles.This was contentious and a frequent issue of complaint, as there was a growing belief that land should be held by hereditary right, not through the favour of the king.

Property and wealth became increasingly focused in the hands of a subset of the nobility, the great magnates, at the expense of the wider baronage, encouraging the breakdown of some aspects of local feudalism.As time went by, the Norman nobility intermarried with many of the great Anglo-Saxon families, and the links with the Duchy of Normandy began to weaken.By the late 12th century, mobilising the English barons to fight on the continent was proving difficult, and John's attempts to do so ended in civil war.

=== Administrative organisation ===
Alongside the shires and hundreds, boroughs played an important role in the administration and organisation of England in the High Middle Ages. Boroughs were towns that enjoyed a special status due to their economic, strategic or political importance. They usually developed from older Anglo-Saxon settlements or fortified towns (burhs), which were originally founded by King Alfred the Great in the 9th century as a defence against the Vikings. In the High Middle Ages, these boroughs became urban centres with their own rights and privileges, which distinguished them from the surrounding rural areas. Boroughs were usually more closely linked to the king than the surrounding rural areas and were often under the direct control of the crown. They often had the right to manage their own affairs, particularly in relation to trade, taxation and local jurisdiction. These rights were granted to them by royal charters. A borough could be administered by a reeve (a local official, similar to the sheriff at shire level), but later many boroughs developed their own town councils or elected officials such as mayors and aldermen who took over the administration. In larger boroughs such as London or York, self-government was particularly pronounced

== Society ==
=== Women ===
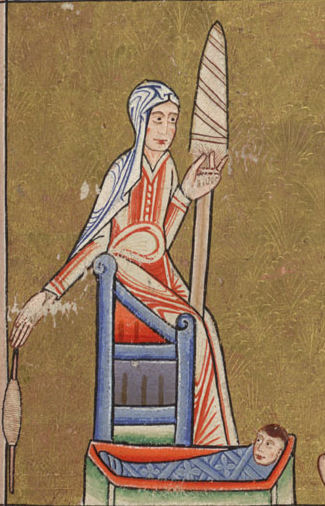
A depiction of an English woman c. 1170 using a spindle and distaff, while caring for a young child

Medieval England was a patriarchal society, and the lives of women were heavily influenced by contemporary beliefs about gender and authority. However, the position of women varied according to factors including their social class; whether they were unmarried, married, widowed or remarried; and in which part of the country they lived. Significant gender inequities persisted throughout the period, as women typically had more limited life-choices, access to employment and trade, and legal rights than men. After the Norman Conquest, the position of women in society changed. The rights and roles of women became more sharply defined, in part as a result of the development of the feudal system and the expansion of the English legal system; some women benefited from this, while others lost out. The rights of widows were formally laid down in law by the end of the 12th century, clarifying the right of free women to own property, but this did not necessarily prevent women from being forcibly remarried against their wishes.

The growth of governmental institutions under a succession of bishops reduced the role of queens and their households in formal government. Married or widowed noblewomen remained significant cultural and religious patrons and played an important part in political and military events, even if chroniclers were uncertain if this was appropriate behaviour. As in earlier centuries, most women worked in agriculture, but here roles became more clearly gendered, with ploughing and managing the fields defined as men's work, for example, and dairy production becoming dominated by women.

=== Identity ===
The Normans and French who arrived after the conquest saw themselves as different from the English. They had close family and economic links to the Duchy of Normandy, spoke Norman French and had their own distinctive culture. For many years, to be English was to be associated with military failure and serfdom. During the 12th century, the divisions between the English and Normans began to dissolve as a result of intermarriage and cohabitation.By the end of the 12th century, possibly as early as the 1150s, contemporary commentators believed the two peoples to be blending, and the loss of the duchy in 1204 reinforced this trend. The resulting society still prized wider French cultural values, however, and French remained the language of the court, business and international affairs, even if Parisians mocked the English for their poor pronunciation.During the 12th and 13th centuries, the English began to consider themselves superior to the Welsh, Scots and Bretons. The English perceived themselves as civilised, economically prosperous and properly Christian, while the Celtic fringe was considered lazy, barbarous and backward. Following the invasion of Ireland in the late 12th century, similar feelings were expressed about the Irish.

=== Language ===
In the High Middle Ages, the English language underwent profound changes, which were largely characterised by the Norman influence after the Conquest. When William came to power, French became the language of the nobility, the administration, the legal system and the church, while English was spoken primarily in the lower social classes. Anglo-Norman, a variant of Old French, had a huge influence on the vocabulary of English. Many French words, especially from the fields of law, administration, military, religion and culture, were integrated into the English language. Examples of this are terms such as court, justice, prison and council. This lexical influence led to greater differentiation in English, as French loanwords were often used for more elevated or abstract terms, while the English equivalents for everyday things were retained (e.g. sheep for animal and mutton for meat, from the French mouton). This linguistic division reflects the social hierarchy: the nobility and the elite used French, while the common people stuck to English.

== Religion ==
=== Ecclesiastical structures and orders ===
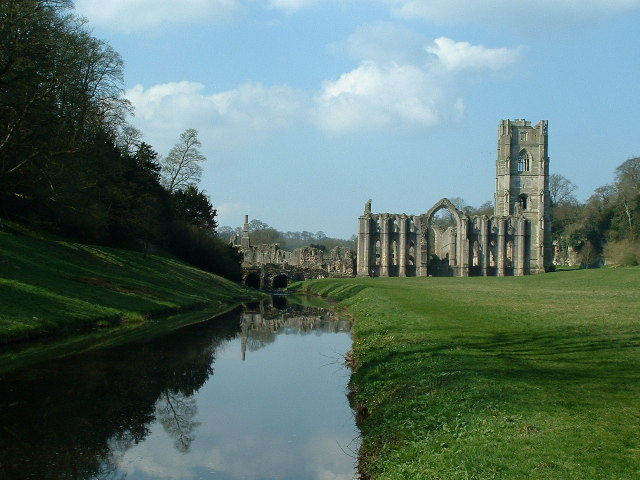
Fountains Abbey, one of the Cistercian monasteries built in the 12th century

The Norman Conquest brought a new set of Norman and French churchmen to power; some adopted and embraced aspects of the former Anglo-Saxon religious system, while others introduced practices from Normandy. Extensive English lands were granted to monasteries in Normandy, allowing them to create daughter priories and monastic cells across the kingdom. The monasteries were brought firmly into the web of feudal relations, with their holding of land linked to the provision of military support to the crown. The Normans adopted the Anglo-Saxon model of monastic cathedral communities, and within 70 years the majority of English cathedrals were controlled by monks; every English cathedral, however, was rebuilt to some extent by the new rulers. England's bishops remained powerful temporal figures and in the early 12th century raised armies against Scottish invaders and built up extensive holdings of castles across the country.

New orders began to be introduced into England. As ties to Normandy waned, the French Cluniac order became fashionable and their houses were introduced in England. The Augustinians spread quickly from the beginning of the 12th century onwards, while later in the century the Cistercians reached England, creating houses with a more austere interpretation of the monastic rules and building the great abbeys of Rievaulx and Fountains. By 1215, there were over 600 monastic communities in England, but new endowments slowed during the 13th century, creating long-term financial problems for many institutions.The religious military orders that became popular across Europe from the 12th century onwards, including the Knights Templar, Teutonic Knights and Knights Hospitaller, acquired possessions in England.

=== Church and state ===
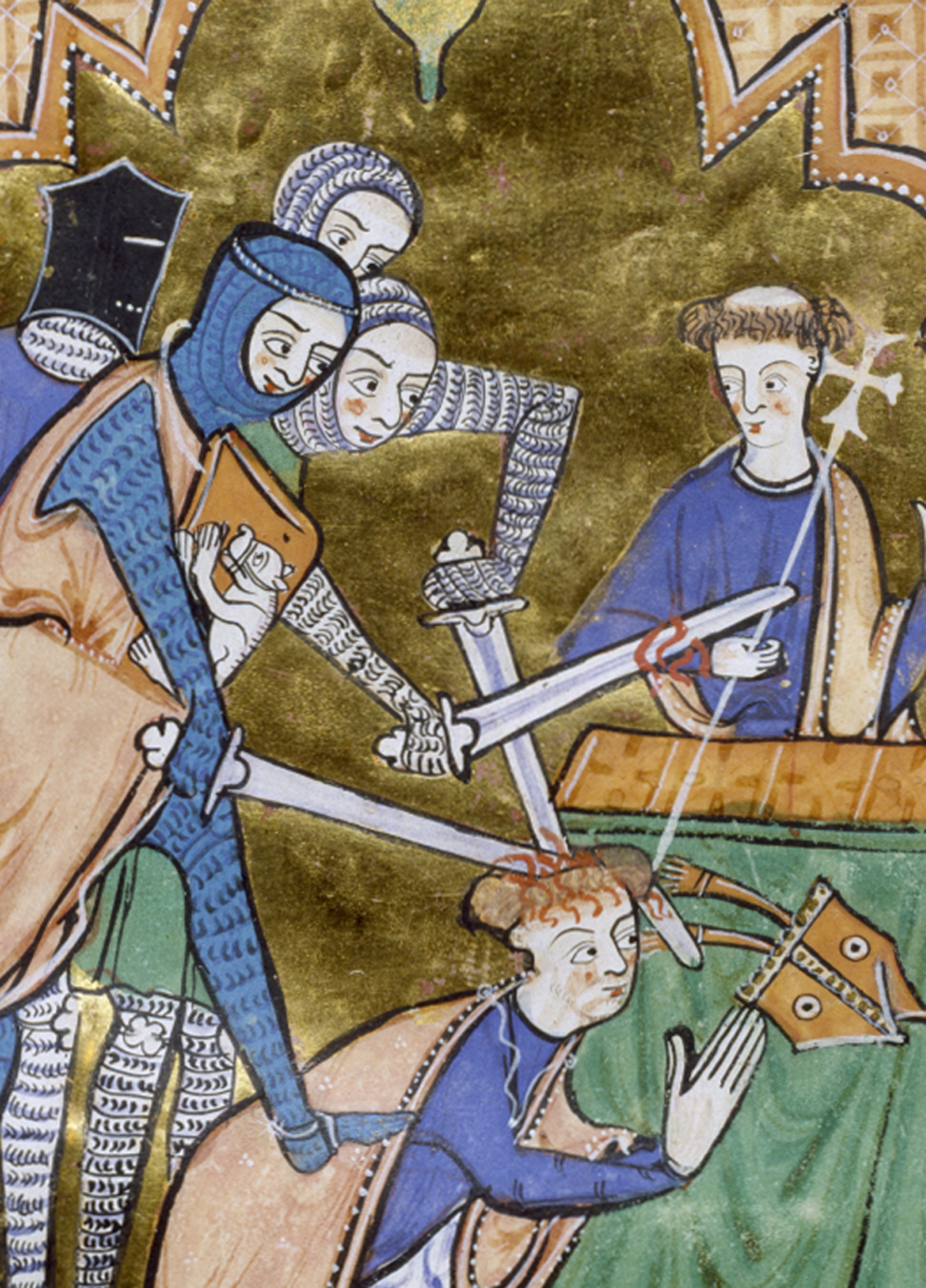
Mid-thirteenth-century depiction of the death of Archbishop Thomas Becket

William the Conqueror acquired the support of the Church for the invasion of England by promising ecclesiastical reform. William promoted celibacy amongst the clergy and gave ecclesiastical courts more power, but he also reduced the Church's direct links to Rome and made it more accountable to the king. Tensions arose between these practices and the reforming movement of Pope Gregory VII, which advocated greater autonomy from royal authority for the clergy, condemned the practice of simony and promoted greater influence for the papacy in church matters. Despite the bishops continuing to play a major part in royal government, tensions emerged between the kings of England and key leaders within the English Church. Kings and archbishops clashed over rights of appointment and religious policy, and successive archbishops including Anselm, Theobald of Bec, Thomas Becket and Stephen Langton were variously forced into exile, arrested by royal knights or even killed. By the early 13th century, however, the church had largely won its argument for independence, answering almost entirely to Rome.

=== Pilgrimages ===
Pilgrimages were a popular religious practice throughout the Middle Ages in England, with the tradition dating back to the Roman period. Typically pilgrims would travel short distances to a shrine or a particular church, either to do penance for a perceived sin or to seek relief from an illness or other condition. Some pilgrims travelled further, either to more distant sites within Britain or in a few cases on to the continent. Under the Normans, religious institutions with important shrines such as Glastonbury, Canterbury and Winchester, promoted themselves as pilgrimage destinations, maximising the value of the historic miracles associated with the sites. Accumulating relics became an important task for ambitious institutions, as these were believed to hold curative powers and lent status to the site. By the 12th century reports of posthumous miracles by local saints were becoming increasingly common in England, adding to the attractiveness of pilgrimages to prominent relics.

=== Crusades ===
The idea of undertaking a pilgrimage to Jerusalem was not new in England, as the idea of religiously justified warfare went back to Anglo-Saxon times. While English participation in the First Crusade between 1095–99 was limited, England played a prominent part in the Second, Third and Fifth Crusades over the next two centuries, with many crusaders leaving for the Levant during the intervening years. Many of those who took up the Cross to go on a Crusade never actually left, often because the individual lacked sufficient funds to undertake the journey. Raising funds to travel typically involved crusaders selling or mortgaging their lands and possessions, which affected their families and, at times the economy as a whole was considerably affected.

== Landscape ==
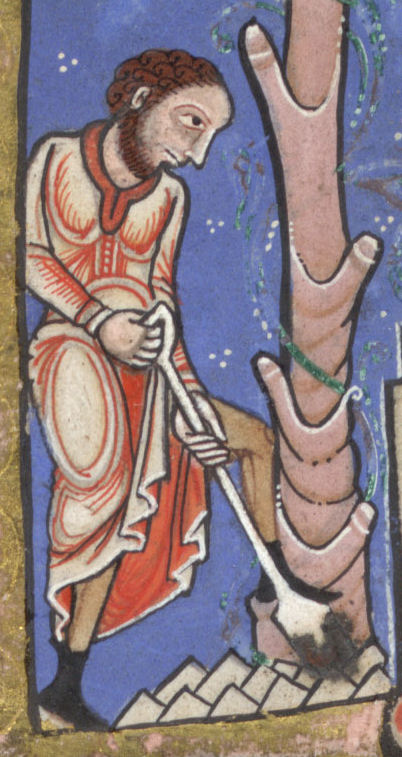
An English serf at work digging, c. 1170

England had a diverse geography in the medieval period, from the Fenlands of East Anglia or the heavily wooded Weald, through to the upland moors of Yorkshire. Despite this, medieval England broadly formed two zones, roughly divided by the rivers Exe and Tees: the south and east of England had lighter, richer soils, able to support both arable and pastoral agriculture, while the poorer soils and colder climate [sic] of the north and west produced a predominantly pastoral economy. Slightly more land was covered by trees than in the 20th century, and bears, beavers and wolves lived wild in England, bears being hunted to extinction by the 11th century and beavers by the 12th.

Of the 10,000 miles of roads that had been built by the Romans, many remained in use and four were of particular strategic importance—the Icknield Way, the Fosse Way, Ermine Street and Watling Street—which criss-crossed the entire country.The road system was adequate for the needs of the period, although it was significantly cheaper to transport goods by water. The major river networks formed key transport routes, while many English towns formed navigable inland ports.

=== Weather and climate ===
The weather and climate in England was characterised by a relatively mild and stable period known as the Medieval Warm Period (c. 950-1250). This period was characterised by higher average temperatures than in the centuries before and after. The warm period led to a longer growing season, better agricultural yields and population growth. In southern England, the average annual temperature was probably around 1-2 °C higher than today. Summers in particular were warmer and winters milder. This was favoured by more stable weather conditions, which meant fewer extreme cold spells. Rainfall was moderate to sufficient, which favoured agriculture. In the late 13th century, a gradual drop in temperature began, which signalled the coming Little Ice Age and led to harsher climatic conditions.

=== Environment ===
England in the High Middle Ages was a diverse region shaped by nature, with its landscape characterized by forests, meadows, marshes, rivers, and cultivated areas. Although human settlement and agricultural use had already significantly impacted the environment, much of England was still covered by semi-natural landscapes. About 1/4 of the land was used for agriculture. The main farming areas were located in fertile regions such as the Midlands and East Anglia, where the soil was particularly suitable for growing grains. Most people lived in small, scattered settlements, separated by extensive fields, pastures, and forests. The rest of the land consisted of woodlands, moors, marshes, heathlands, and unused grasslands.

The forests were predominantly made up of deciduous trees such as oaks, beeches, hornbeams, elms, and ashes, with occasional conifers like pines. The undergrowth consisted of shrubs such as holly, hazel, and hawthorn. In areas with poorer soils, such as the Pennines and parts of Yorkshire, there were extensive heathlands. In East Anglia and the western parts of England, there were large areas of marshes and wetlands. Forests were home to deer, stags, wild boars, wolves, and lynxes. Marshes and wetlands were habitats for beavers, otters, cranes, and a variety of waterfowl. Meadows and fields were populated by hares, rabbits (introduced by the Normans), foxes, badgers, and numerous bird species such as larks and buzzards. Rivers were rich in fish, including trout, pike, sturgeon, and eels.

== Economy and demography ==
The English economy was fundamentally agricultural, depending on growing crops such as wheat, barley and oats on an open field system, and husbanding sheep, cattle and pigs. Agricultural land became typically organised around manors, and was divided between some fields that the landowner would manage directly, called demesne, and the majority of the fields that would be cultivated by local peasants. These peasants would pay tithe to the landowner either in the form of cash or produce.

Between 1066 and 1250, the English economy underwent a period of significant transformation, characterised by the Norman Conquest, population growth (Note: Between 1086 and 1300 the population grew from around 1.5 million 4 to 5 million) and the integration of England into European trade. This period was characterised by slow but steady economic growth, which was particularly evident in agriculture, trade and urbanisation. Agricultural productivity increased between 1100 and 1250 due to the introduction of new techniques such as the three-field farming system and the increased use of ploughs and draught animals. This led to better soil cultivation and an increase in crop yields, which in turn fuelled population growth. At the same time, more and more arable land was gained. Nevertheless, agricultural production was largely geared towards local consumption and surpluses were only traded to a limited extent.

Many hundreds of new towns—some of them planned communities—were built across England, supporting the creation of guilds, charter fairs and other medieval institutions which governed the growing trade. Jewish financiers played a significant role in funding the growing economy, along with the new Cistercian and Augustinian religious orders that emerged as major players in the wool trade of the north. Mining increased in England, with a silver boom in the 12th century helping to fuel the expansion of the money supply.

Cities such as London, York, Winchester and Norwich developed into trading centres and benefited from increasing urbanisation.London, the largest trading centre, had a major port on the Thames and maintained close trading links with Flanders, France, the Baltic and the Mediterranean. The Hanseatic League which dominated trade in northern Europe also played a role in the exchange of goods between England and the Baltic neighbours. English ports such as Boston and Lynn became important transhipment centres for the wool trade. Norman kings and later the Plantagenets encouraged trade by regulating tariffs and taxes and granting trading privileges to foreign merchants.

== Warfare ==
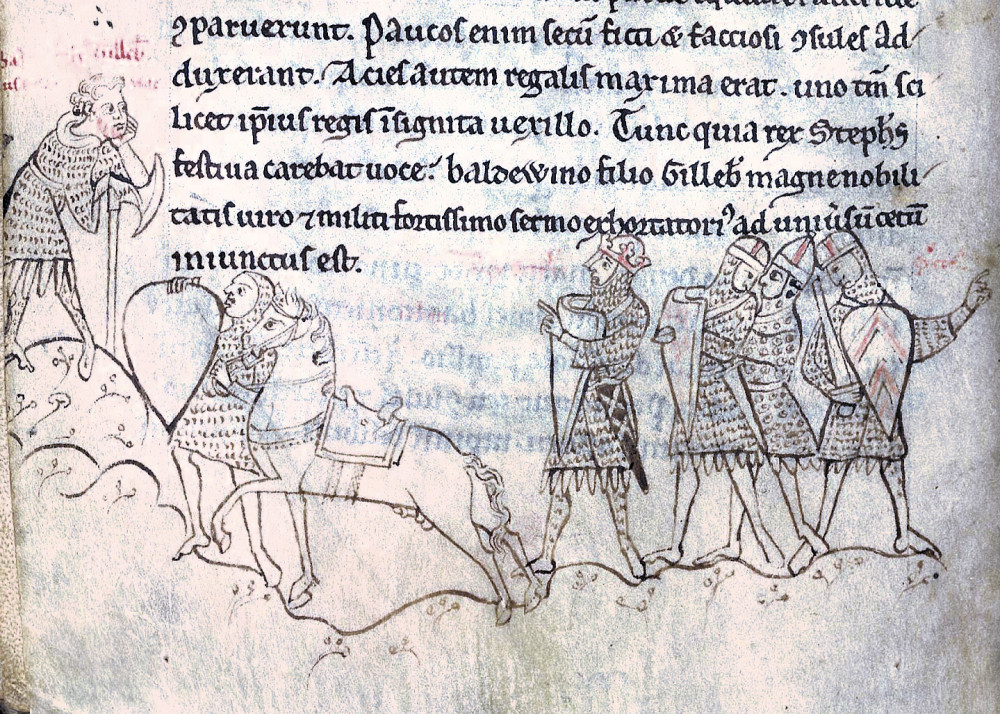
The Battle of Lincoln (1141) from the Historia Anglorum

Anglo-Norman warfare was characterised by attritional military campaigns, in which commanders tried to raid enemy lands and seize castles in order to allow them to take control of their adversaries' territory, ultimately winning slow but strategic victories. Pitched battles were occasionally fought between armies but these were considered risky engagements and usually avoided by prudent commanders. The armies of the period comprised bodies of mounted, armoured knights, supported by infantry. Crossbowmen become more numerous in the twelfth century, alongside the older shortbow. At the heart of these armies was the familia regis, the permanent military household of the king, which was supported in war by feudal levies, drawn up by local nobles for a limited period of service during a campaign. Mercenaries were increasingly employed, driving up the cost of warfare, and adequate supplies of ready cash became essential for the success of campaigns.

Naval forces played an important role during the Middle Ages, enabling the transportation of troops and supplies, raids into hostile territory and attacks on enemy fleets. English naval power became particularly important after the loss of Normandy in 1204, which turned the English Channel from a friendly transit route into a contested and critical border region.

Although a small number of castles had been built in England during the 1050s, after the conquest the Normans began to build timber motte and bailey and ringwork castles in large numbers to control their newly occupied territories. During the 12th century the Normans began to build more castles in stone, with characteristic square keeps that supported both military and political functions. Royal castles were used to control key towns and forests, whilst baronial castles were used by the Norman lords to control their widespread estates; a feudal system called the castle-guard was sometimes used to provide garrisons. Castles and sieges continued to grow in military sophistication during the 12th century.

== Culture ==
=== Art ===
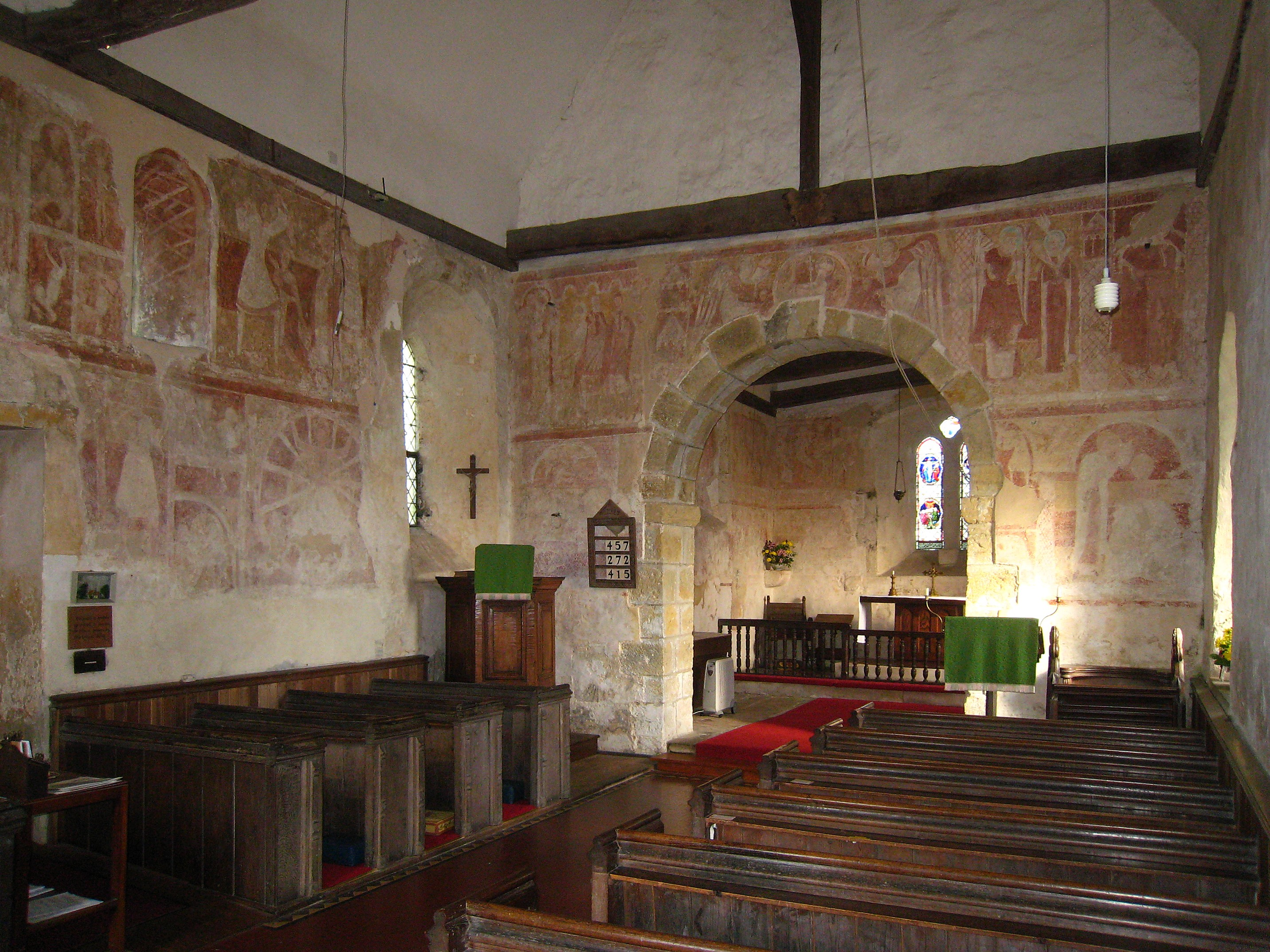
Romanesque paintings in St Botolph's Church, Hardham

The Conquest introduced northern French artistic styles, particular in illuminated manuscripts and murals, and reduced the demand for carvings. In other artistic areas, including embroidery, the Anglo-Saxon influence remained evident into the 12th century, and the famous Bayeux Tapestry is an example of older styles being reemployed under the new regime. Stained glass had been introduced into Anglo-Saxon England. Very few examples of glass survive from the Norman period, but there are a few examples that survive from minor monasteries and parish churches. The largest collections of 12th-century stained glass at the Cathedrals of York and Canterbury.

=== Literature and music ===
Historians David C. Douglas and George Greenaway remark on the survival of written records from the period "Without exaggeration it may be said that from no other country in the world has there been preserved from this distant age a collection of historical evidence comparable to that which illustrates the history of England during [1024 and 1189]." Poetry and stories written in French were popular after the Norman conquest, and by the twelfth century some works on English history began to be produced in French verse. Romantic poems about tournaments and courtly love became popular in Paris and this fashion spread into England in the form of lays; stories about the court of King Arthur were also fashionable, due in part to the interest of Henry II. English continued to be used on a modest scale to write local religious works and some poems in the north of England, but most major works were produced in Latin or French. Music and singing were important in England during the medieval period, being used in religious ceremonies, court occasions and to accompany theatrical works. From the eleventh century distinctive monophonic plainchant was superseded, as elsewhere in Europe, by standardised Gregorian chant.

=== Architecture ===
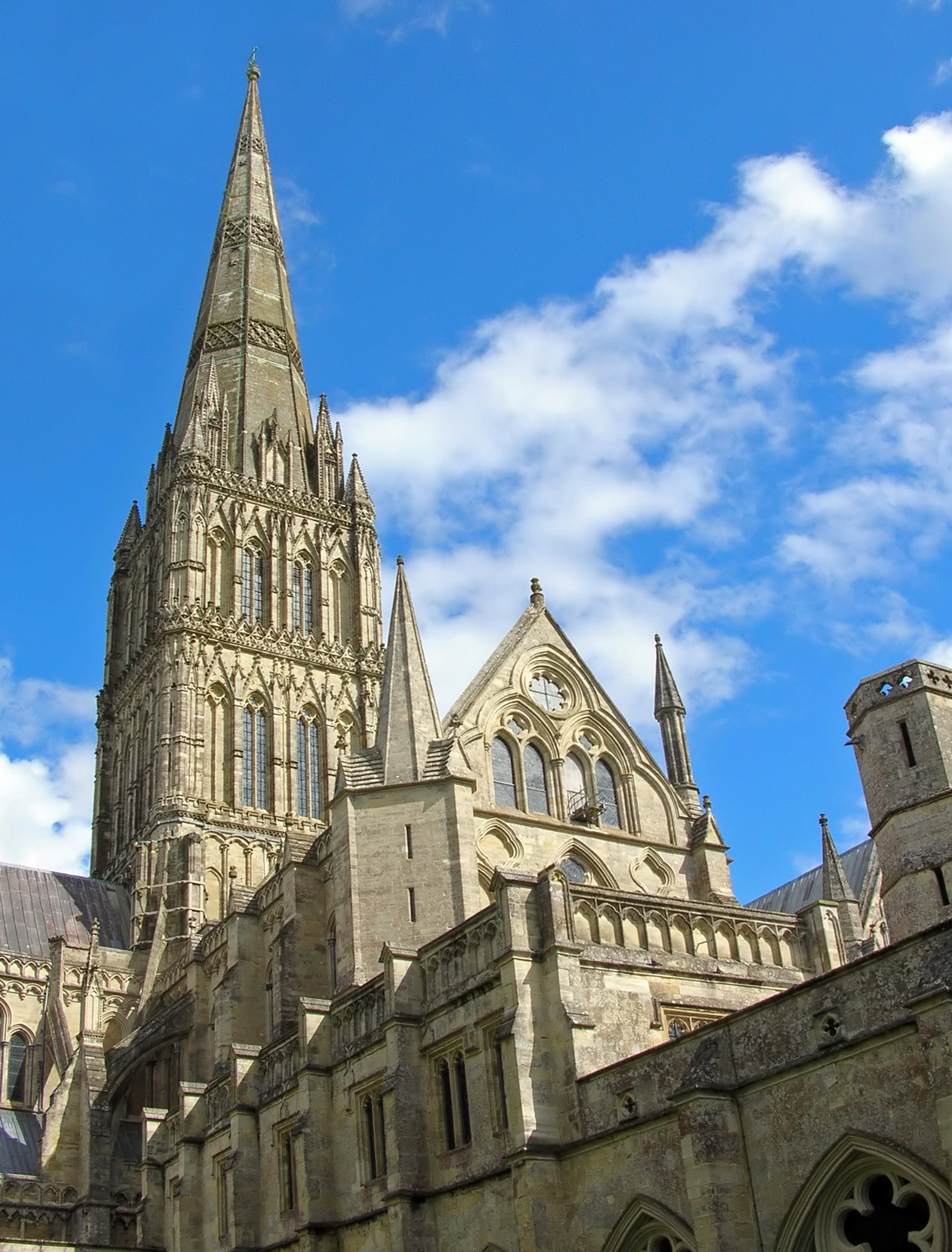
Salisbury Cathedral which (excluding the tower and spire) is in the Early English style

The Normans brought with them architectural styles from their own duchy, where austere stone churches were preferred. Under the early Norman kings this style was adapted to produce large, plain cathedrals with ribbed vaulting. During the twelfth century the Anglo-Norman style became richer and more ornate, with pointed arches derived from French architecture replacing the curved Romanesque designs; this style is termed Early English Gothic and continued, with variation, throughout the rest of the Middle Ages. In domestic architecture, the Normans, having first occupied the older Anglo-Saxon dwellings, rapidly beginning to build larger buildings in stone and timber. The elite preferred houses with large, ground-floor halls but the less wealthy constructed simpler houses with the halls on the first floor; master and servants frequently lived in the same spaces. Wealthier town-houses were also built using stone, and incorporated business and domestic arrangements into a single functional design.

== Popular representations ==
The period has been used in a wide range of popular culture. William Shakespeare's plays on the lives of the medieval kings have proved to have had long lasting appeal, heavily influencing both popular interpretations and histories of figures such as King John. Other playwrights have since taken key events and personalities as the subject of drama, including T. S. Eliot's Murder in the Cathedral (1935) and Jean Anouilh's Becket (1959), that focus on the death of Thomas Becket and James Goldman's The Lion in Winter (1966), which focuses on Henry II and his sons. Walter Scott's location of Robin Hood in the reign of Richard I and his emphasis on the conflict between Saxons and Normans set the template for much later fiction and film adaptations. Historical fiction set in England during the Middle Ages remains persistently popular, with the 1980s and 1990s seeing a particular growth of historical detective fiction such as Ellis Peters's The Cadfael Chronicles set in the Anarchy, x which is also the location of much of Ken Follett's best-selling The Pillars of the Earth (1989). Film-makers have drawn extensively on the medieval period, often taking themes from Shakespeare or the Robin Hood ballads for inspiration and adapting historical romantic novels as Ivanhoe (1952). Late revivals of these genres include Robin Hood: Prince of Thieves (1991) and Kingdom of Heaven (2005).

== Bibliography ==
- Ackroyd, Peter (2000). London: A Biography. London: Vintage. ISBN 0-09-942258-1.
- Airlie, Stuart (2001). "Strange Eventful Histories: The Middle Ages in the Cinema". In Linehan, Peter; Nelson, Janet L. (eds.). The Medieval World. London: Routledge. ISBN 978-0-415-30234-0.
- Alexander, James W. (1970). "The Becket Controversy in Recent Historiography". The Journal of British Studies. 9 (2): 1–26. doi:10.1086/385589. JSTOR 175153. S2CID 163007102.
- Ashley, Mike (2003). A Brief History of British Kings and Queens. New York: Carroll & Graf Publishers. ISBN 0-7867-1104-3.
- Astill, Grenville; Grant, Annie (1988). The Countryside of medieval England. Oxford: Basil Blackwell. ISBN 0631150919.
- Aurell, Martin (2003). L'Empire de Plantagenêt, 1154–1224. Paris: Tempus. ISBN 978-2-262-02282-2.
- Aurell, Martin (2007). "Henry II and Arthurian Legend". In Harper-Bill, Christopher; Vincent, Nicholas (eds.). Henry II: New Interpretations. Woodbridge, UK: Boydell Press. ISBN 978-1-84383-340-6.
- Bailey, Mark (1996). "Population and Economic Resources". In Given-Wilson, Chris (ed.). An Illustrated History of Late Medieval England. Manchester, UK: Manchester University Press. ISBN 978-0-7190-4152-5.
- Ballard, Adolphus (1913). British borough charters, 1042-1216. Cambridge: Cambridge University Press. OCLC 1041626475.
- Barber, Richard W. (1997). The Devil's Crown: A History of Henry II and His Sons (2 ed.). London: Combined Books. ISBN 0938289780.
- Barlow, Frank (1986). Thomas Becket. London: Weidenfeld & Nicolson. ISBN 978-0-297-79189-8.
- Barlow, Frank (1999). The Feudal Kingdom of England, 1042–1216. Harlow, UK: Pearson Education. ISBN 0582381177.
- Barlow, Frank (2000). William Rufus (Second ed.). New Haven, CT: Yale University Press. ISBN 0-300-08291-6.
- Barron, Caroline M. (2004). London in the later Middle Ages : Government and People, 1200-1500. Oxford: Oxford University Press. ISBN 0199257779.
- Bartlett, Robert (2002). England Under the Norman and Angevin Kings, 1075–1225. Oxford: Oxford University Press. ISBN 0199251010.
- Bates, David (2001). William the Conqueror. Stroud, UK: Tempus. ISBN 978-0-7524-1980-0.
- Behrens, Dietrich (1896). Zur Lautlehre der französischen Lehnwörter im Mittelenglischen. Beiträge zur Geschichte der französischen Sprache in England (in German). Vol. I. Heilbronn: Henninger. OCLC 1222557190.
- Blanchard, Ian (2002). "Lothian and Beyond: the Economy of the "English Empire" of David I". In Britnell, Richard; Hatcher, John (eds.). Progress and Problems in Medieval England: Essays in Honour of Edward Miller. Cambridge, UK: Cambridge University Press. ISBN 978-0-521-52273-1.
- Bolton, L.J. (1980). The medieval English economy, 1150-1500. London: J.M. Dent. ISBN 9780847662340.
- Bradbury, Jim (2009). Stephen and Matilda: the Civil War of 1139–53. Stroud, UK: The History Press. ISBN 978-0-7509-3793-1.
- Brinton, Laurel J. (2006). The English language : a linguistic history. Oxford: Oxford University Press. ISBN 9780195422054.
- Brown, R. Allen (1962). English Castles. London: Batsford. OCLC 1392314.
- Bull, Marcus (2007). Criticism of Henry II's Expedition to Ireland in William of Canterbury's Miracles of St Thomas Becket. Vol. 33. pp. 107–129. doi:10.1016/j.jmedhist.2007.04.001. ISBN 978-0199251018. S2CID 159794578.
- Burton, Janet E. (1994). Monastic and Religious Orders in Britain, 1000–1300. Cambridge, UK: Cambridge University Press. ISBN 978-0-521-37797-3.
- Cantor, Leonard (1982). "Introduction: The English Medieval Landscape". In Cantor, Leonard (ed.). The English Medieval Landscape. London: Croon Helm. ISBN 978-0-7099-0707-7.
- Carlton, Charles (2003). Royal Warriors: A Military History of the British Monarchy. Harlow: Pearson Education. ISBN 0-582-47265-2.
- Carpenter, David (2004). The Struggle for Mastery: The Penguin History of Britain 1066–1284. New York: Penguin. ISBN 978-0-14-014824-4.
- Chibnall, Marjorie (1986). Anglo-Norman England 1066–1166. Oxford, UK: Basil Blackwell. ISBN 978-0-631-15439-6.
- Chrimes, Stanley Bertram (1965). English Constitutional History. London: Oxford University Press. OCLC 504101.
- Clark, George (1978). English History : a survey. London: Book club Associates. OCLC 71732182.
- Contamine, Phillipe (1992). Histoire militaire de la France (tome 1, des origines à 1715) (in French). PUF. ISBN 2-13-048957-5.
- Creighton, Oliver Hamilton (2005). Castles and Landscapes: Power, Community and Fortification in Medieval England. London: Equinox. ISBN 978-1-904768-67-8.
- Daniell, Christopher (2013). From Norman Conquest to Magna Carta: England 1066–1215. London: Routledge. ISBN 978-1136356971.
- Danziger, Danny; Gillingham, John (2003). 1215: The Year of Magna Carta. Hodder & Stoughton. ISBN 978-0-340-82475-7.
- Davies, R. R. (1990). Domination and Conquest: The Experience of Ireland, Scotland and Wales, 1100–1300. Cambridge, UK: Cambridge University Press. ISBN 978-0-521-02977-3.
- Davies, H. W., ed. (1993). Medieval England. London: Studio Editions. ISBN 1858910773.
- D'haen, Theo (2004). "Stalking Multiculturalism: Historical Sleuths at the end of the Twentieth Century". In Bak, Hans (ed.). Uneasy Alliance: Twentieth-Century American Literature, Culture and Biography. Amsterdam: Rodopi. ISBN 978-90-420-1611-8.
- Douglas, David C. (1964). William the Conqueror: The Norman Impact Upon England. Berkeley: University of California Press. ISBN 9780520003484.
- Douglas, David; Greenaway, G. W., eds. (2007) [1953]. English Historical Documents. Volume II: 1042–1189. Taylor & Francis. ISBN 978-0-19-520235-9.
- Driver, M. W.; Ray, S (2004). The medieval hero on screen: representations from Beowulf to Buffy. Jefferson: McFarland. ISBN 0786419261.
- Driver, Martha W.; Ray, Sid (2009). "General Introduction". In Driver, Martha W.; Ray, Sid (eds.). Shakespeare and the Middle Ages: Essays on the Performance and Adaptation of the Plays with Medieval Sources or Settings. Jefferson: McFarland. ISBN 978-0-7864-3405-3.
- Duggan, Charles (1965). "From the Conquest to the Death of John". In Lawrence, C. H. (ed.). The English Church and the Papacy in the Middle Ages (1999 Reprint ed.). Stroud, UK: Sutton. pp. 63–116. ISBN 0-7509-1947-7.
- Dyer, Christopher (2000). Everyday Life in Medieval England. London: Hambledon and London. ISBN 978-1-85285-201-6.
- Dyer, Christopher (2009). Making a Living in the Middle Ages: The People of Britain 850–1520. New Haven, London: Yale University Press. ISBN 978-0-300-10191-1.
- Emery, Anthony (2007). Discovering Medieval Houses. Risborough: Shire Publications. ISBN 978-0-7478-0655-4.
- Favier, Jean (1993). Dictionnaire de la France médiévale (in French). Paris: Fayard. ISBN 9782213031392.
- Flori, Jean (1999). Richard Coeur de Lion: le roi-chevalier (in French). Paris: Biographie Payot. ISBN 978-2-228-89272-8.
- Forey, Alan (1992). The Military Orders From the Twelfth to the Early Fourteenth Centuries. Basingstoke: Macmillan. ISBN 978-0-333-46235-5.
- Grant, Lindy (2005). Architecture and Society in Normandy, 1120–1270. Yale: Yale University Press. ISBN 0-300-10686-6.
- Green, Judith (2009). Henry I: King of England and Duke of Normandy. Cambridge, UK: Cambridge University Press. ISBN 978-0-521-74452-2.
- Hamilton, J. S. (2010). The Plantagenets: History of a Dynasty. London: Bloomsbury. ISBN 978-1441157126.
- Happé, Peter (2003). "A Guide to Criticism of Medieval English Theatre". In Beadle, Richard (ed.). The Cambridge Companion to Medieval English Theatre. Cambridge: Cambridge University Press. ISBN 978-0-521-45916-7.
- Haydock, N.; Risden, E. L. (2009). Hollywood in the Holy Land: Essays on Film Depictions of the Crusades and Christian-Muslim Clashes. Jefferson: McFarland. ISBN 978-0786453177.
- Higham, Nick (2000). The Death of Anglo-Saxon England. Stroud, UK: Sutton. ISBN 978-0-7509-2469-6.
- Hiley, David (1995). Western Plainchant: a Handbook. Oxford, UK: Oxford University Press. ISBN 0198165722.
- Hillaby, Joe (2003). "Jewish Colonisation in the Twelfth Century". In Skinner, Patricia (ed.). The Jews in Medieval Britain: Historical, Literary, and Archaeological Perspectives. Woodbridge: Boydell Press. ISBN 978-0-85115-931-7.
- Hodgett, Gerald (2006). A Social and Economic History of Medieval Europe. Abingdon: Routledge. ISBN 978-0-415-37707-2.
- Hollister, C. Warren (2003). Frost, Amanda Clark (ed.). Henry I. New Haven: Yale University Press. ISBN 978-0-300-09829-7.
- Hooper, Nicholas (1996). The Cambridge Illustrated Atlas of Warfare. Cambridge: Cambridge University Press. ISBN 0-521-44049-1.
- Horrox, Rosemary; Ormrod, W. Mark (2006). A Social History of England, 1200-1500. Cambridge: Cambridge University Press. ISBN 978-0-521-78954-7.
- Hulme, Richard (2007). "Twelfth Century Great Towers – The Case for the Defence" (PDF). The Castle Studies Group Journal (21): 209–229.
- Huscroft, Richard (2005). Ruling England 1042–1217. London: Pearson/Longman. ISBN 978-0-582-84882-5.
- Huscroft, Richard (2009). The Norman Conquest: A New Introduction. New York: Longman. ISBN 978-1-4058-1155-2.
- Johns, Susan M. (2003). Noblewomen, Aristocracy and Power in the Twelfth-Century Anglo-Norman Realm. Manchester: Manchester University Press. ISBN 0-7190-6305-1.
- Jones, Dan (2012). The Plantagenets: The Kings Who Made England. London: HarperPress. ISBN 978-0-00-745749-6.
- Kaufman, J. E.; Kaufman, H. W. (2001). The Medieval Fortress: Castles, Forts, and Walled Cities of the Middle Ages. Cambridge, MA: Da Capo Press. ISBN 978-0-306-81358-0.
- Krieger, Larry; Neill, Kenneth; Jantzen, Steven (1992). World History: Perspectives on the Past. Lexington: D.C. Health and Company. ISBN 0-669-25598-X. OL 7629944M.
- Liddiard, Robert (2005). Castles in Context: Power, Symbolism and Landscape, 1066 to 1500. Macclesfield, UK: Windgather Press. ISBN 0-9545575-2-2.
- Mate, Mavis (2006). Trade and Economic Developments 1450–1550: The Experience of Kent, Surrey and Sussex. Suffolk: Boydell Press. ISBN 1-84383-189-9.
- Meredith, Hugh Owen (1908). Outlines of the economic history of England, a study in social development. London: Pitman. ISBN 1050266129.
- Morillo, Stephen (1994). Warfare Under the Anglo-Norman Kings 1066–1135. Woodbridge: Boydell Press. ISBN 978-0-85115-689-7.
- Myers, A. R. (1978). English Society in the Late Middle Ages, 1066–1307 (8th ed.). Harmondsworth: Penguin. ISBN 0-14-020234-X.
- Nilson, Ben (2001). Cathedral Shrines of Medieval England. Woodbridge: Boydell Press. ISBN 978-0-85115-808-2.
- Ortenberg, Veronica (2006). In Search of The Holy Grail: The Quest for the Middle Ages. London: Hambledon Continuum. ISBN 978-1-85285-383-9.
- Pantin, W. A. (1963). "Medieval English Town-House Plans" (PDF). Medieval Archaeology. 6–7: 202–239. doi:10.1080/00766097.1962.11735667.
- Pounds, Norman John Greville (1994). The Medieval Castle in England and Wales: A Social and Political History. Cambridge: Cambridge University Press. ISBN 978-0-521-45828-3.
- Pounds, Norman John Greville (2005). The Medieval City. Westport: Greenwood Press. ISBN 978-0-313-32498-7.
- Prestwich, J. O. (1992). "The Military Household of the Norman Kings". In Strickland, Matthew (ed.). Anglo-Norman Warfare. Woodbridge: Boydell Press. ISBN 0-85115-327-5.
- Prestwich, Michael (2005). Plantagenet England, 1225-1360. Oxford: Clarendon Press. ISBN 9780198228448.
- Prior, Stuart (2006). A Few Well-Positioned Castles: The Norman Art of War. Stroud: Tempus. ISBN 978-0-7524-3651-7.
- Rennison, Nick (2012). Robin Hood. Oldcastle Books. ISBN 978-1842436370.
- Rose, Susan (2002). Medieval Naval Warfare, 1000–1500. London: Routledge. ISBN 978-0-415-23976-9.
- Rubin, Miri (2006). The Hollow Crown: The Penguin History of Britain 1272–1485. London: Penguin. ISBN 978-0-14-014825-1.
- Schama, Simon (2000). A History of Britain – At the edge of the world. BBC. ISBN 0-563-53483-4.
- Smedley, Edward (1836). From the final partition of the Empire of Charlemagne to the Peace of Cambray. The History of France. Vol. 1. London: Baldwin and Craddock. OCLC 667647003.
- Stafford, Pauline (1989). Unification and Conquest: A Political and Social History of England in the Tenth and Eleventh Centuries. London: Edward Arnold. ISBN 978-0-7131-6532-6.
- Stenton, Doris Mary (1976). English Society in the Early Middle Ages, 1066–1307. Harmondsworth: Penguin. ISBN 0-14-020252-8.
- Stringer, Keith J. (1993). The Reign of Stephen: Kingship, Warfare and Government in Twelfth-Century England. London: Routledge. ISBN 978-0-415-01415-1.
- Thomas, Hugh M. (2003). The English and the Normans: Ethnic Hostility, Assimilation, and Identity, 1066-c.1220. Oxford: Oxford University Press. ISBN 978-0-19-925123-0.
- Thomas, Hugh (2007). The Norman Conquest: England after William the Conqueror. Critical Issues in History. Lanham, MD: Rowman & Littlefield Publishers, Inc. ISBN 978-0-7425-3840-5.
- Tiwawi, Subha; Tiwawi, Maneesha (2007). The Plays of T.S. Eliot. New Delhi: Atlantic. ISBN 978-81-269-0649-9.
- Turner, Hilary L. (1971). Town Defences in England and Wales. London: John Baker. OCLC 463160092.
- Turner, Ralph V (1994). King John. London: Longman. ISBN 978-0-582-06726-4.
- Turner, Richard Charles (1996). Ken Follett: A Critical Companion. Westport: Greenwood Publishing Group. ISBN 0313294151.
- Tyerman, Christopher (1996). England and the Crusades, 1095–1588. Chicago: University of Chicago Press. ISBN 978-0-226-82013-2.
- Umland, S. J.; Umland, R. J. (1996). The Use of Arthurian Legend in Hollywood Film: from Connecticut Yankees to Fisher Kings. London: Greenwood. ISBN 0313297983.
- Walker, Ian (2000). Harold the Last Anglo-Saxon King. Gloucestershire: Wrens Park. ISBN 978-0-905778-46-4.
- Warren, W. Lewis (1991). King John. London: Methuen. ISBN 0-413-45520-3.
- Warren, W. Lewis (2000). Henry II. New Haven: Yale University Press. ISBN 978-0-300-08474-0.
- Webb, Diana (2000). Pilgrimage in Medieval England. London: Hambledon. ISBN 978-1-85285-250-4.
- Williams, Ann (2003). Æthelred the Unready: The Ill-Counselled King. London: Hambledon & London. ISBN 978-1-85285-382-2.
