= North Thoresby =

Village and civil parish in the East Lindsey district of Lincolnshire, England

Coordinates: 53°28′00″N 0°03′16″W

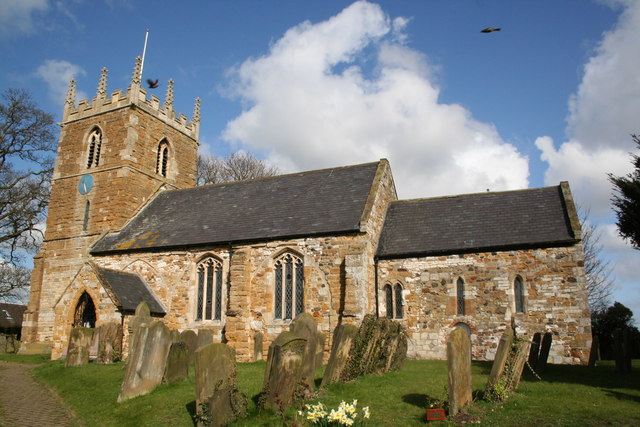
- St Helen's parish church

- Location within Lincolnshire
- Population: 1,068 (2011)
- OS grid reference: TF292984
  - London: 140 mi (230 km) S
- District: East Lindsey
- Shire county: Lincolnshire
- Region: East Midlands
- Country: England
- Sovereign state: United Kingdom
- Post town: Grimsby
- Postcode district: DN36
- Police: Lincolnshire
- Fire: Lincolnshire
- Ambulance: East Midlands
- UK Parliament: Louth and Horncastle

North Thoresby is a village and civil parish in the East Lindsey district of Lincolnshire, England. It is situated between Louth and Grimsby, approximately 7.5 miles (12 km) from each. and has a village population of 1,068 (2011) Some 50.5% of the population is older than 60 years.

The area is chiefly agricultural, but the majority of employed residents work in Grimsby and Cleethorpes, or in the industries situated on the Humber bank.

The name North Thoresby is composed of the given name Thor and the suffix 'by', as with other villages in the area – indicating the influence of the Vikings. South Thoresby, also in Lincolnshire, is located to the south of Louth. Thoresby Hall is not in this area, but is located in Nottinghamshire some 50 miles (80 km) to the west.

== History ==
Researchers believe they found archeological evidence, just outside the village, that grapes were grown in the area by the Romans during their occupation. This claim has been contested. The Village lies on a Roman road from Cadeby to North Coates, believed to have been a route of salt transportation from the coast to Lincoln.

North Thoresby is listed in the same Domesday entry as Autby, and in 1416 it was combined into Thoresby-cum-Autby parish, following the desertion of Autby and the loss of the village church.

The Anglican parish church, St Helen's, occupies a site where Christian worship has continued for more than 1,000 years. Like most churches of its age it has seen many alterations from an original simple room to a 15th-century edifice with north and south aisles. The south aisle was demolished in Elizabethan times but remains of it survive inside the church. The church includes part of a Saxon grave cover, Tudor bench-ends and Restoration plaques which record the work tradesman such as "putty makers". There is also a memorial tablet to Francis Bond (1852-1918), the late 19th-century authority on Gothic architecture, who was born in the village. Historically the parish was within Haverstoe, the south division of the Bradley-Haverstoe wapentake, in the North Riding of Lindsey.

North Thoresby was enclosed in 1839, its Tithe barn still stands having been converted into a private dwelling standing to the east of the rectory.

Wesleyans and Primitive Methodists each had a chapel here prior to 1900. The Methodist chapel, school and school house, were built in the mid-19th century. In 1985 the school and house were converted into a community centre, The Wesley Centre, when the primary school relocated to a new building on High Street.

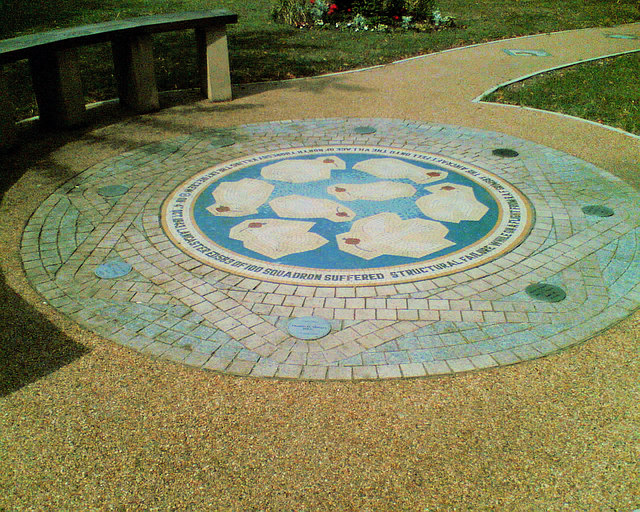
Mosaic commemorating the crew of Avro Lancaster ED583

During the Second World War, on 4 October 1943, an RAF Avro Lancaster ED583 crashed in the village during a test flight from RAF Waltham, killing the crew. A memorial was dedicated to them on 4 September 2005.

== Governance ==
An electoral ward in the same name exists. This ward stretches south to Ludborough with a total population taken at the 2011 census of 1,933.

== Amenities ==
North Thoresby has two public houses (with restaurants), a number of shops, a microbrewery, a used-car sales company, a primary school, surgery and pharmacy, a village hall, and facilities for football, cricket and bowls. Both the Parish Council and a voluntary group, The Village People, promote community activities.

== Transport ==
North Thoresby is on the route of regular bus service between Louth and Grimsby. The village is also served by the National Express route between Grimsby and London, and Grimsby and Westward Ho!, stopping on the A16 close to the Halfway House, formerly Marquis of Granby public house. The village's railway station was on the East Lincolnshire Railway line from Louth to Grimsby until closed to passengers in 1970, with all freight movement on the line suspended in 1980 following the Beeching Axe. The line was reopened in part as the heritage Lincolnshire Wolds Railway in 2009, which currently runs between the village and Ludborough.

== Sport ==
North Thoresby and District Bowls Club are an outdoor bowls club affiliated to the English Bowling Federation, and play in four leagues - Grimsby, Skegness, Louth Wold and Lindsey Marsh. The team is based at The Storr Green. Amy Monkhouse, a World Ladies Bowls Champion, first became interested in the game at the club.

== Notable people ==
- Luke Fawcett, a trade unionist, awarded a knighthood in 1948.
- Thomas Kendall, a New Zealand missionary and recorder of the Māori language.
- Robert Mapletoft, an English churchman and academic, Master of Pembroke College, Cambridge and Dean of Ely.
