= Economics of English agriculture in the Middle Ages =

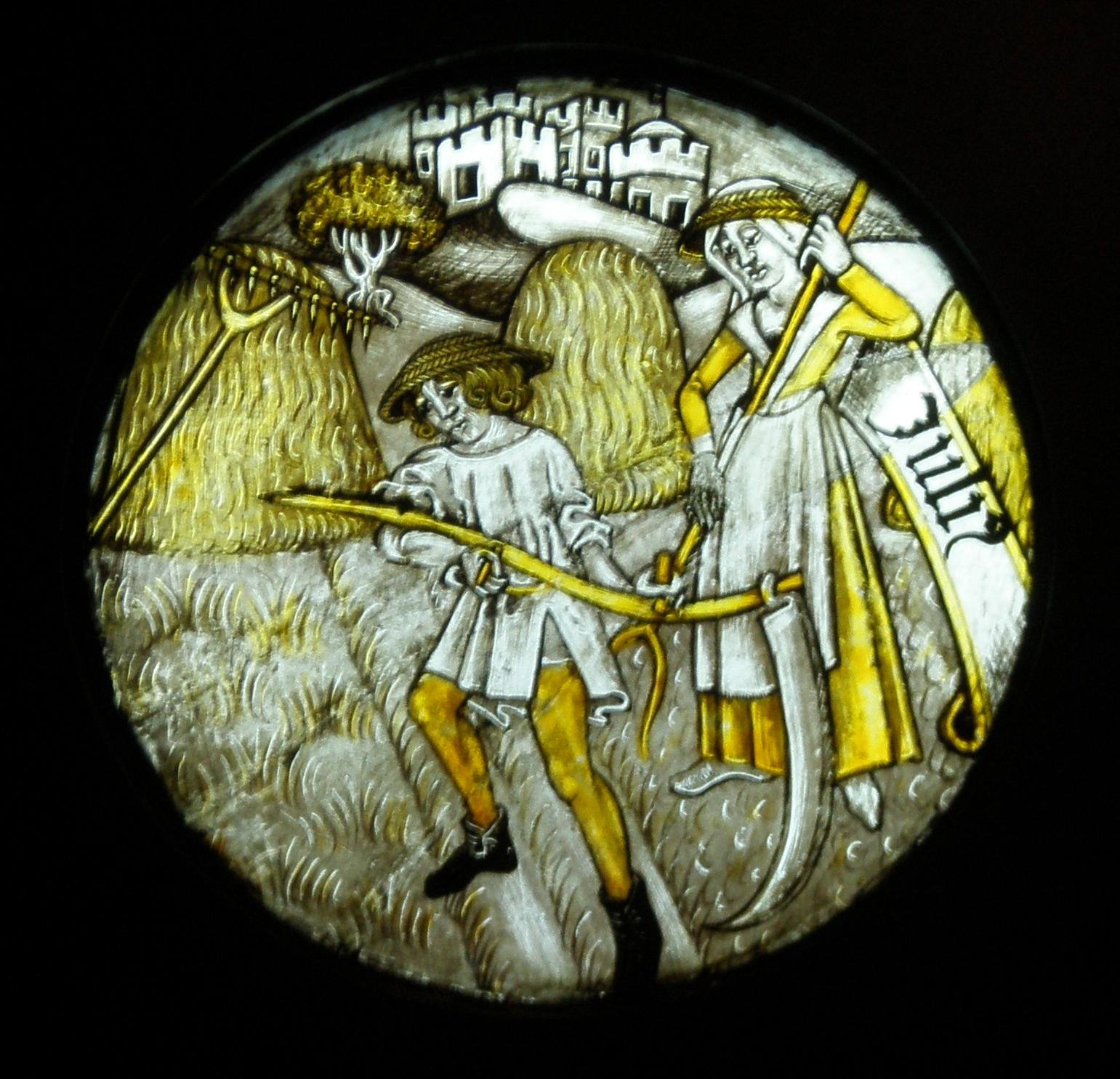
15th-century hay-making, depicted in an English stained glass window.

The economics of English agriculture in the Middle Ages is the economic history of English agriculture from the Norman invasion in 1066, to the death of Henry VII in 1509. England's economy was fundamentally agricultural throughout the period, though even before the invasion the market economy was important to producers. Norman institutions, including serfdom, were superimposed on an existing system of open fields.

Over the next five centuries the English agricultural economy grew but struggled to support the growing population, and then suffered an acute crisis, resulting in significant political and economic change. By the end of the period, England would have an economy dominated by rented farms, many controlled by the rising class of the gentry.

== English agriculture at the time of the Norman Invasion ==
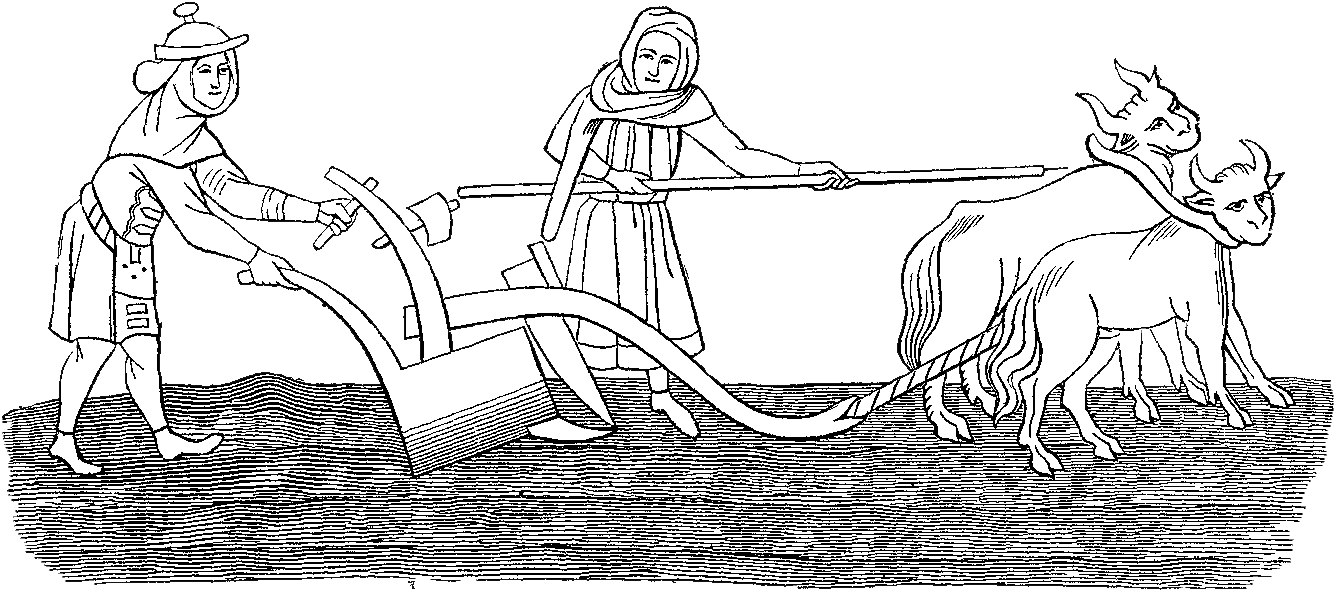
Ploughmen at work with oxen.

Agriculture formed the bulk of the English economy at the time of the Norman invasion. Twenty years after the invasion, 35% of England was covered in arable land, 25% put to pasture, with 15% covered by woodlands and the remaining 25% predominantly being moorland, fens and heaths. Wheat formed the single most important arable crop, but rye, barley and oats were also cultivated extensively.

In the more fertile parts of the country such as the Thames valley, the Midlands and the east of England, legumes and beans were also cultivated. Sheep, cattle, oxen and pigs were kept on English holdings, although most of these breed were much smaller than modern equivalents and most would have been slaughtered in winter.

=== Manorial system ===
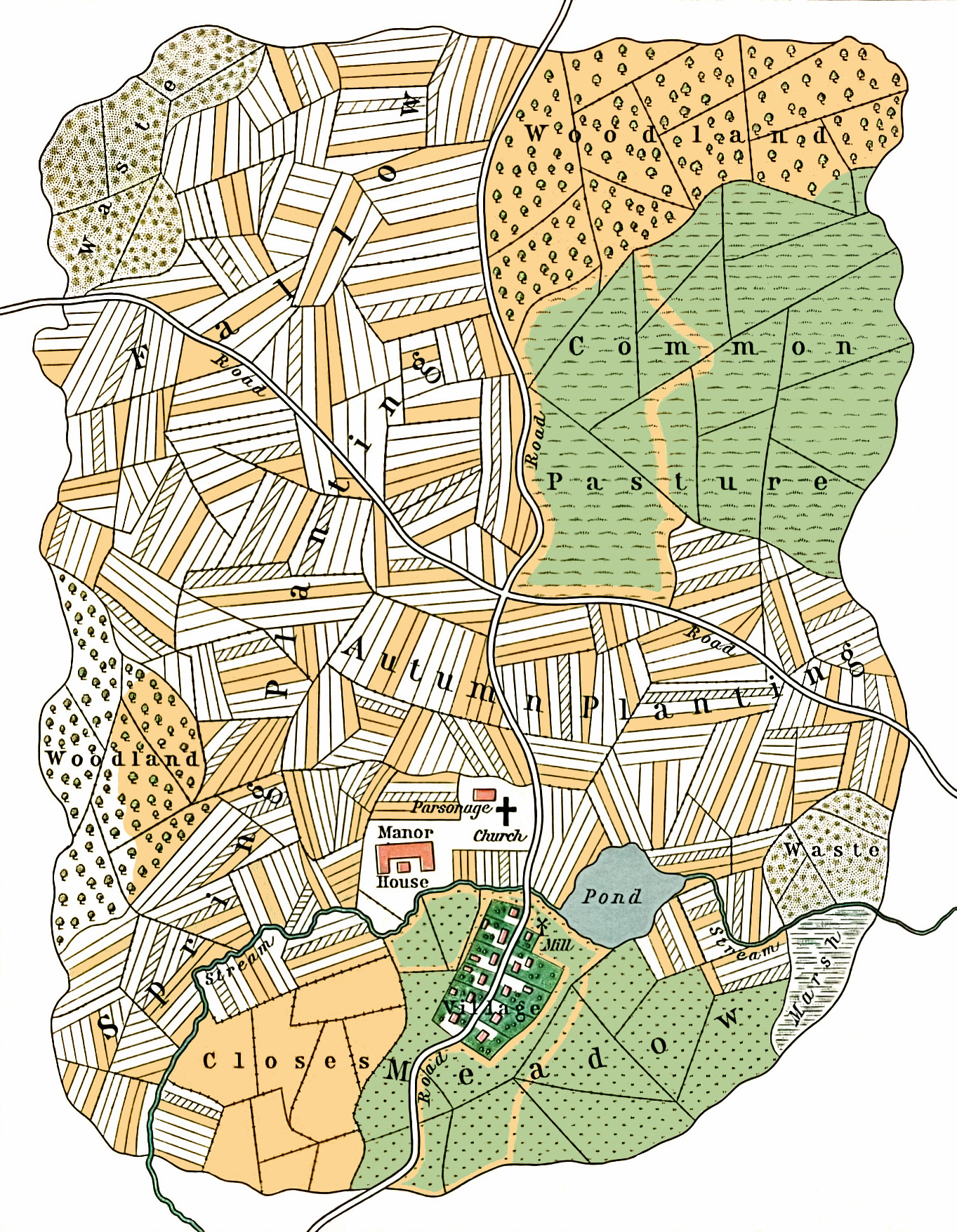
The open field system, central to many medieval English communities.

In the century prior to the Norman invasion, England's great estates, owned by the king, bishops, monasteries and thegns, had been slowly broken up as a consequence of inheritance, wills, marriage settlements or church purchases. Most of the smaller landowning nobility lived on their properties and managed their own estates. The pre-Norman landscape had seen a trend away from isolated hamlets and towards larger villages engaged in arable cultivation in a band running north–south across England.

These new villages had adopted an open field system in which fields were divided into small strips of land, individually owned, with crops rotated between the field each year and the local woodlands and other common lands carefully managed. Agricultural land on a manor was divided between some fields that the landowner would manage and cultivate directly, called demesne land, and the majority of the fields that would be cultivated by local peasants who would pay rent to the landowner either through agricultural labour on the lord's demesne fields, or through cash or produce.

Around 6,000 watermills of varying power and efficiency had been built in order to grind flour, freeing up peasant labour for other more productive agricultural tasks. The early English economy was not a subsistence economy and many crops were grown by peasant farmers for sale to the early English towns.

The Normans initially did not significantly alter the operation of the manor or the village economy. William reassigned large tracts of land amongst the Norman elite, creating vast estates in some areas, particularly along the Welsh border and in Sussex. The biggest change in the years after the invasion was the rapid reduction in the number of slaves being held in England. In the 10th century slaves had been very numerous, although their number had begun to diminish as a result of economic and religious pressure.

Nonetheless, the new Norman aristocracy proved harsh landlords. The wealthier, formerly more independent Anglo-Saxon peasants found themselves rapidly sinking down the economic hierarchy, swelling the numbers of unfree workers, or serfs, forbidden to leave their manor and seek alternative employment. Those Anglo-Saxon nobles who had survived the invasion itself were rapidly assimilated into the Norman elite or economically crushed.

By 1086 when the Domesday Book was prepared, the Normans owned more than ninety percent of the land. Just two native Englishmen still had significant landholdings: Thorkill of Arden, who held seventy-one manors in Warwickshire, and Coleswain, who had forty-four manors.

== Mid-medieval growth (1100-1290) ==
The 12th and 13th centuries were a period of huge economic growth in England. The population of England rose from around one and a half million in 1086 to around four or five million in 1300, stimulating increased agricultural outputs and the export of raw materials to Europe.

In contrast to the previous two centuries, England was relatively secure from invasion. Except for the years of the Anarchy, most military conflicts either had only localised economic impact or proved only temporarily disruptive. English economic thinking remained conservative, seeing the economy as consisting of three groups: the ordines, those who fought, or the nobility; laboratores, those who worked, in particular the peasantry; and oratores, those who prayed, or the clerics. Trade and merchants played little part in this model and were frequently vilified at the start of the period, although increasingly tolerated towards the end of the 13th century.

The Medieval Warm Period followed the Norman conquest. Average summer temperatures were higher, and rainfall marginally lower, than in the modern day and there is evidence of vineyards in southern England.

=== English agriculture and the landscape ===
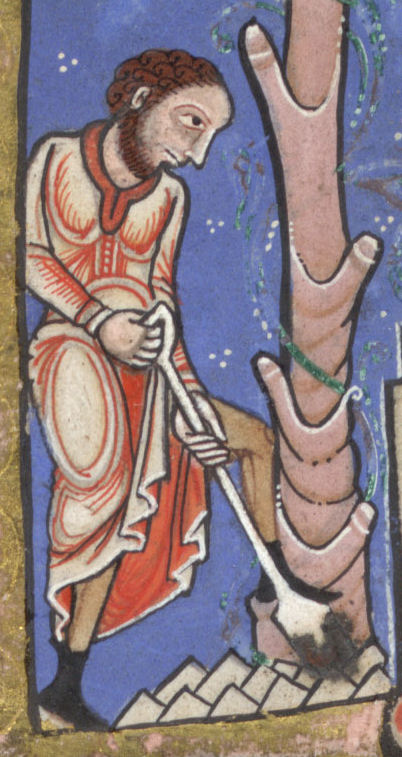
An English serf at work digging, c. 1170.

Agriculture remained by far the most important part of the English economy during the 12th and 13th centuries. There remained a wide variety in English agriculture, influenced by local geography; in areas where grain could not be grown, other resources were exploited instead. In the Weald, for example, agriculture centred on grazing animals on the woodland pastures, whilst in the Fens fishing and bird-hunting was supplemented by basket making and peat cutting.

In some locations, such as Lincolnshire and Droitwich, salt manufacture was important, including production for the export market. Fishing became an important trade along the English coast, especially in Great Yarmouth and Scarborough, with the herring a particularly popular catch; salted at the coast, it could then be shipped inland or exported to Europe. Piracy between competing English fishing fleets was not unknown during the period.

Sheep were the most common farm animal in England during the period, their numbers doubling by the 14th century. Sheep became increasingly widely used for wool, particularly in the Welsh borders, Lincolnshire and the Pennines. Pigs remained popular on holdings because of their ability to scavenge for food. Oxen remained the primary plough animal, with horses used more widely on farms in the south of England towards the end of the 12th century.

Rabbits were introduced from France in the 13th century, being farmed for their meat in special warrens. The underlying productivity of English agriculture remained low, despite the increases in food production. Wheat prices fluctuated heavily year to year, depending on local harvests, with up to a third of the grain being produced in England potentially being for sale, much of it ending up in the growing towns.

=== Development of estate management ===
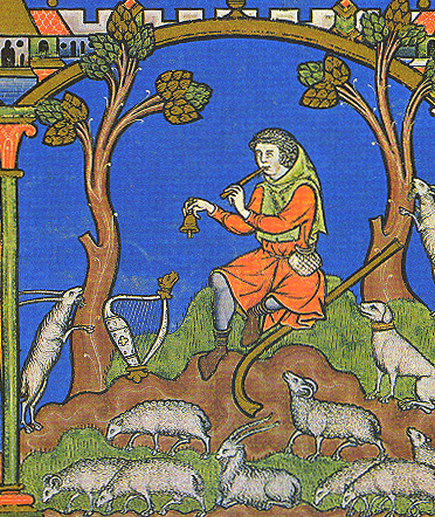
Sheep, shown here c. 1250, became increasingly important to English agriculture.

The Normans retained and reinforced the manorial system with its division between demesne and peasant lands paid for in agricultural labour. Landowners could profit from the sales of goods from their demesne lands and a local lord could also expect to receive income from fines and local customs, whilst more powerful nobles profited from their own regional courts and rights.

During the 12th century major landowners tended to rent out their demesne lands for money, motivated by static prices for produce and the chaos of the Anarchy between 1135 and 1153. This practice began to alter in the 1180s and 1190s, spurred by the greater political stability. In the first years of John's reign, agricultural prices almost doubled, at once increasing the potential profits on the demesne estates and also increasing the cost of living for the landowners themselves. Landowners now attempted wherever possible to bring their demesne lands back into direct management, creating a system of administrators and officials to run their new system of estates.

=== Agricultural development ===
New land was brought into cultivation to meet demand for food, including drained marshes and fens, including Romney Marsh, the Somerset Levels and the Fens; royal forests from the late 12th century onwards; poorer lands in the north, south-west and in Welsh Marches. The first windmills in England began to appear along the south and east coasts in the 12th century, expanding in number in the 13th, adding to the mechanized power available to the manors.

By 1300 it has been estimated that there were more than 10,000 watermills in England, used both for grinding corn and for fulling cloth. Improved ways of running estates began to be circulated and were popularised in Walter de Henley's famous book, Le Dite de Hosebondrie, written around 1280. In some regions and under some landowners investment and innovation increased yields significantly through improved ploughing and fertilisers, particularly in Norfolk where yields eventually equalled later 18th century levels.

=== The role of the Church in agriculture ===
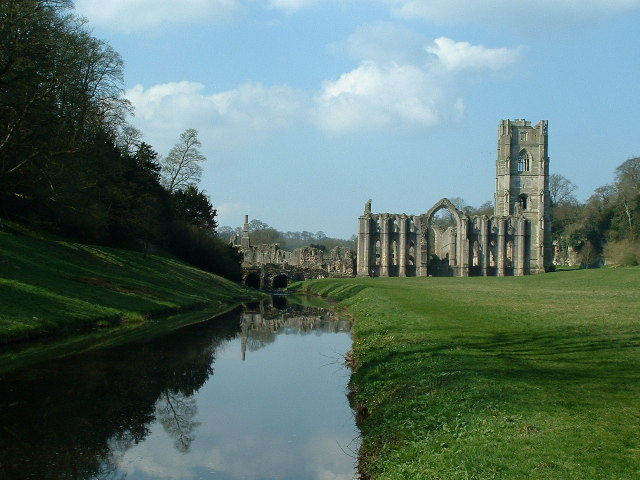
Fountains Abbey, one of the new Cistercian monasteries built in the medieval period with wealth derived from agriculture and trade.

The Church in England was a major landowner throughout the medieval period and played an important part in the development of agriculture and rural trade in the first two centuries of Norman rule. The Cistercian order first arrived in England in 1128, establishing around eighty new monastic houses over the next few years; the wealthy Augustinians also established themselves and expanded to occupy around 150 houses, all supported by agricultural estates, many of them in the north of England.

By the 13th century these and other orders were acquiring new lands and had become major economic players both as landowners and as middlemen in the expanding wool trade. In particular, the Cistercians led the development of the grange system. Granges were separate manors in which the fields were all cultivated by the monastic officials, rather than being divided up between demesne and rented fields, and became known for trialling new agricultural techniques during the period. Elsewhere, many monasteries had significant economic impact on the landscape, such as the monks of Glastonbury, responsible for the draining of the Somerset Levels to create new pasture land.

The military crusading order of the Knights Templar also held extensive property in England, bringing in around £2,200 per annum by the time of their fall. It was primarily rural holdings rented out for cash, but also some urban properties in London. Following the dissolution of the Templar order in France by Philip IV of France, Edward II ordered their properties to be seized and passed to the Hospitaller order in 1313, but in practice many properties were taken by local landowners and the hospital was still attempting to reclaim them twenty-five years later.

The 12th century also saw a concerted attempt to curtail the remaining rights of unfree peasant workers and to set out their labour rents more explicitly in the form of the English Common Law. This process resulted in Magna Carta explicitly authorising feudal landowners to settle law cases concerning feudal labour and fines through their own manorial courts rather than through the royal courts.

== Mid-medieval economic crisis - the Great Famine and the Black Death (1290-1350) ==
The Black Death reached England in 1348 from Europe.

=== The Great Famine of 1315–1317 ===
The Great Famine of 1315 began a number of acute crises in the English agrarian economy. The famine centred on a sequence of harvest failures in 1315, 1316 and 1321, combined with an outbreak of the murrain sickness amongst sheep and oxen between 1319–21 and the fatal ergotism fungi amongst the remaining stocks of wheat. In the ensuing famine, many people died and the peasantry were said to have been forced to eat horses, dogs and cats as well to have conducted cannibalism against children, although these last reports are usually considered to be exaggerations.

Sheep and cattle numbers fell by up to a half, significantly reducing the availability of wool and meat, and food prices almost doubled, with grain prices particularly inflated. Food prices remained at similar levels for the next decade. Salt prices also increased sharply due to the wet weather.

Various factors exacerbated the crisis. Economic growth had already begun to slow significantly in the years prior to the crisis and the English rural population was increasingly under economic stress, with around half the peasantry estimated to possess insufficient land to provide them with a secure livelihood. Where additional land was being brought into cultivation, or existing land cultivated more intensively, the soil may have become exhausted and useless.

Bad weather also played an important part in the disaster; 1315-6 and 1318 saw torrential rains and an incredibly cold winter, which in combination badly impacted on harvests and stored supplies. The rains of these years was followed by draught in the 1320s and another fierce winter in 1321, complicating recovery.

Disease, independent of the famine, was also high during the period, striking at the wealthier as well as the poorer classes. The commencement of war with France in 1337 only added to the economic difficulties. The Great Famine firmly reversed the population growth of the 12th and 13th centuries and left a domestic economy that was "profoundly shaken, but not destroyed".

=== Black Death ===
The Black Death epidemic first arrived in England in 1348, re-occurring in waves during 1360–2, 1368–9, 1375 and more sporadically thereafter. The most immediate economic impact of this disaster was the widespread loss of life, between around 27% mortality amongst the upper classes, to 40-70% amongst the peasantry. (Note: The precise mortality figures for the Black Death have debated at length for many years.) Despite the very high loss of life, few settlements were abandoned during the epidemic itself, but many were badly affected or nearly eliminated altogether.

The medieval authorities did their best to respond in an organised fashion, but the economic disruption was immense. Building work ceased and many mining operations paused. In the short term, efforts were taken by the authorities to control wages and enforce pre-epidemic working conditions.

Coming on top of the previous years of famine, the longer-term economic implications were profound. In contrast to the previous centuries of rapid growth, the English population would not begin to recover for over a century, despite the many positive reasons for a resurgence. The crisis would dramatically affect English agriculture for the remainder of the medieval period.

== Late medieval economic recovery (1350-1509) ==
The events of the crisis between 1290–1348 and the subsequent epidemics produced many challenges for the English economy. In the decades after the disaster, the economic and social issues arising from the Black Death combined with the costs of the Hundred Years War to produce the Peasants Revolt of 1381. Although the revolt was suppressed it undermined many of the vestiges of the feudal economic order and the countryside became dominated by estates organised as farms, frequently owned or rented by the new economic class of the gentry.

The English agricultural economy remained depressed throughout the 15th century, with growth coming from the greatly increased English cloth trade and manufacturing. The economic consequences of this varied considerably from region to region, but generally London, the South and the West prospered at the expense of the Eastern and the older cities. The role of merchants and of trade became increasingly seen as important to the country and usury became increasingly accepted, with English economic thinking increasingly influenced by Renaissance humanist theories.

=== Collapse of the demesne and the creation of the farming system ===
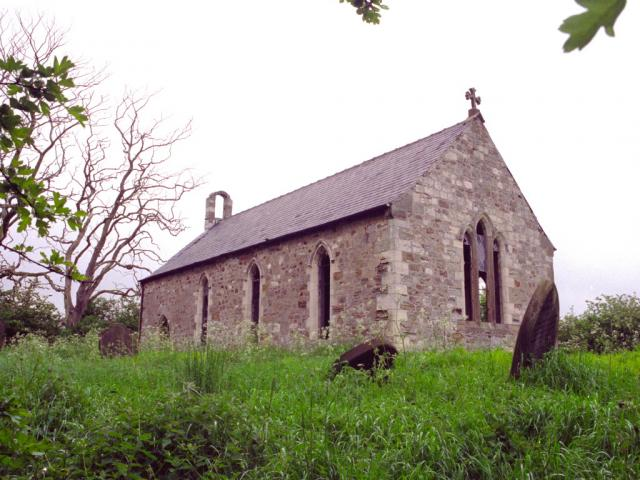
The ruined church in the deserted village of Embleton, County Durham, one of nearly 1,500 medieval villages abandoned after the agrarian crisis of the 14th century.

The agricultural sector of the English economy, still by far the largest, was transformed by the Black Death. With the shortage of manpower after the Black Death, wages for agricultural labourers rapidly increased and continued to then grow steadily throughout the 15th century. As their incomes increased, labourers' living conditions and diet improved steadily. England's much smaller population needed less food and the demand for agricultural products fell. The position of the larger landowners became increasingly difficult.

Revenues from demesne lands were diminishing as demand remained low and wage costs increased; nobles were also finding it more difficult to raise revenue from their local courts, fines and privileges in the years after the Peasants Revolt of 1381. Despite attempts to increase money rents, by the end of the 14th century the rents paid from peasant lands were also declining, with revenues falling as much as 55% between the 1380s and 1420s.

Noble and church landowners responded in various ways. They began to invest significantly less in agriculture and land was increasingly taken out of production altogether. In some cases entire settlements were abandoned, with nearly 1,500 villages lost during this period. They also abandoned the system of direct management of their demesne lands, that had begun back in the 1180s, and turned instead to "farming" out large blocks of land for fixed money rents. Initially livestock and land were rented out together under "stock and lease" contracts, but this was found to be increasingly impractical and contracts for farms became centred purely on land.

As the major estates transformed, a new economic grouping, the gentry, became evident, many of them benefiting from the opportunities of the farming system. Land distribution remained heavily unequal; estimates suggest that the English nobility owned 20% of English lands, the Church and Crown 33%, the gentry 25%, with the remainder (22%) owned by peasant farmers. Agriculture itself continued to innovate, and the loss of many English oxen to the murrain sickness in the crisis increased the number of horses being used to plough fields in the 14th century, a significant improvement on older methods.

== See also ==
- Economy of England in the Middle Ages

== Bibliography ==
- Aberth, John. (2001) From the Brink of the Apocalypse: Confronting Famine, War, Plague and Death in the Later Middle Ages. London: Routledge. ISBN 0-415-92715-3.
- Anderson, Michael. (ed) (1996) British Population History: From the Black Death to the Present Day. Cambridge: Cambridge University Press. ISBN 978-0-521-57884-4.
- Armstrong, Lawrin, Ivana Elbl and Martin M. Elbl. (eds) (2007) Money, Markets and Trade in Late Medieval Europe: Essays in Honour of John H. A. Munro. Leiden: BRILL. ISBN 978-90-04-15633-3.
- Bailey, Mark. (1996) "Population and Economic Resources," in Given-Wilson (ed) 1996.
- Bartlett, Robert. (2000) England under the Norman and Angevin Kings, 1075-1225. Oxford: Oxford University Press. ISBN 978-0-19-925101-8.
- Brown, R. Allen. (ed) (1989) Anglo-Norman Studies XI: Proceedings of the Battle Conference 1988. Woodbridge, UK: Boydell. ISBN 978-0-85115-526-5.
- Burton, Janet E. (1994) Monastic and Religious Orders in Britain, 1000-1300. Cambridge: Cambridge University Press. ISBN 978-0-521-37797-3.
- Cantor, Leonard (ed). (1982) The English Medieval Landscape. London: Croom Helm. ISBN 978-0-7099-0707-7.
- Cantor, Leonard. (1982a) "Introduction: the English Medieval Landscape," in Cantor (ed) 1982.
- Cantor, Leonard. (1982b) "Forests, Chases, Parks and Warrens," in Cantor (ed) 1982.
- Danziger, Danny and John Gillingham. (2003) 1215: The Year of Magna Carta. London: Coronet Books. ISBN 978-0-7432-5778-7.
- Douglas, David Charles. (1962) William the Conqueror: the Norman Impact upon England. Berkeley: University of California Press.
- Dyer, Christopher. (2009) Making a Living in the Middle Ages: The People of Britain, 850 - 1520. London: Yale University Press. ISBN 978-0-300-10191-1.
- Forey, Alan. (1992) The Military Orders from the Twelfth to the Early Fourteenth Centuries. London: Macmillan. ISBN 0-333-46235-1.
- Fryde, E. B. and Natalie Fryde. (1991) "Peasant Rebellion and Peasant Discontents," in Miller (ed) 1991.
- Given-Wilson, Chris (ed). (1996) An Illustrated History of Late Medieval England. Manchester: Manchester University Press. ISBN 978-0-7190-4152-5.
- Hatcher, John. (1996) "Plague, Population and the English Economy," in Anderson (ed) 1996.
- Hicks, Michael (eds). (2001) The Fifteenth Century 2: Revolution and Consumption in Late Medieval England. Woodbridge, UK: Boydell. ISBN 978-0-85115-832-7.
- Hodgett, Gerald. (2006) A Social and Economic History of Medieval Europe. Abingdon, UK: Routledge. ISBN 978-0-415-37707-2.
- Jordan, William Chester. (1997) The Great Famine: Northern Europe in the Early Fourteenth Century. Princeton: Princeton University Press. ISBN 978-0-691-05891-7.
- Keen, Laurence. (1989) "Coastal Salt Production in Norman England," in Brown R. (ed) 1989.
- Kowalski, Maryanne. (2007) "Warfare, Shipping, and Crown Patronage: The Economic Impact of the Hundred Years War on the English Port Towns," in Armstrong, Elbl and Elbl (eds) 2007.
- Lindsay, Jack. (1974) The Normans and their World. Glasgow, UK: HarperCollins. ISBN 978-0-246-10500-4.
- Lee, John. (2001) "The Trade of Fifteenth Century Cambridge and its Region," in Hicks (ed) 2001.
- Miller, Edward. (ed) (1991) The Agrarian History of England and Wales, Volume III: 1348-1500. Cambridge: Cambridge University Press. ISBN 978-0-521-20074-5.
- Myers, A. R. (1971) England in the Late Middle Ages. Harmondsworth, UK: Penguin. ISBN 0-14-020234-X.
- Postan, M. M. (1972) The Medieval Economy and Society. Harmondsworth, UK: Penguin. ISBN 0-14-020896-8.
- Wood, Diana. (2002) Medieval Economic Thought. Cambridge: Cambridge University Press. ISBN 978-0-521-45893-1.
