= Economy of England in the Middle Ages =

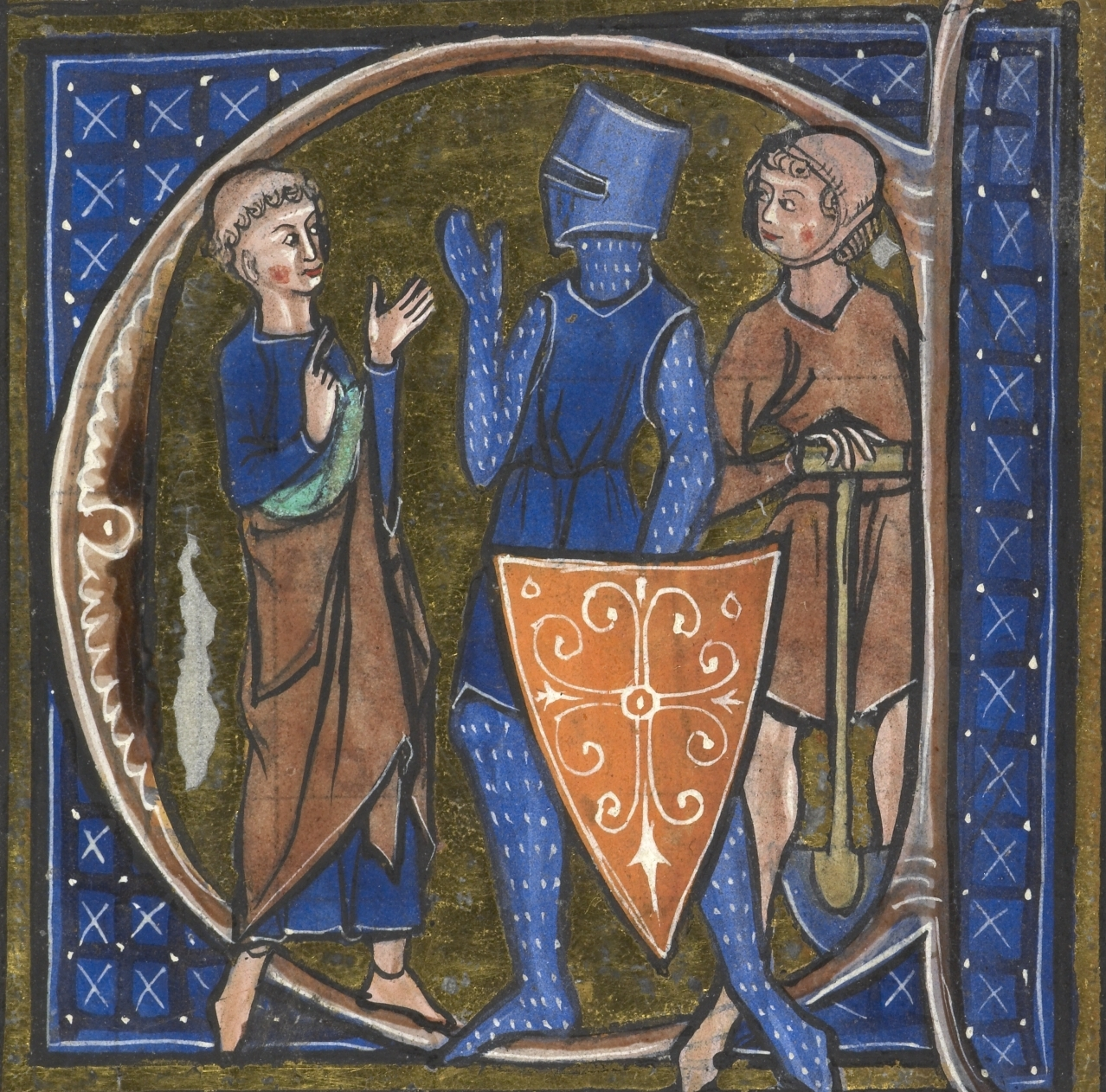
The medieval English saw their society as comprising three groups – the clergy, who prayed; the knights, who fought; and the peasants, who worked the land.

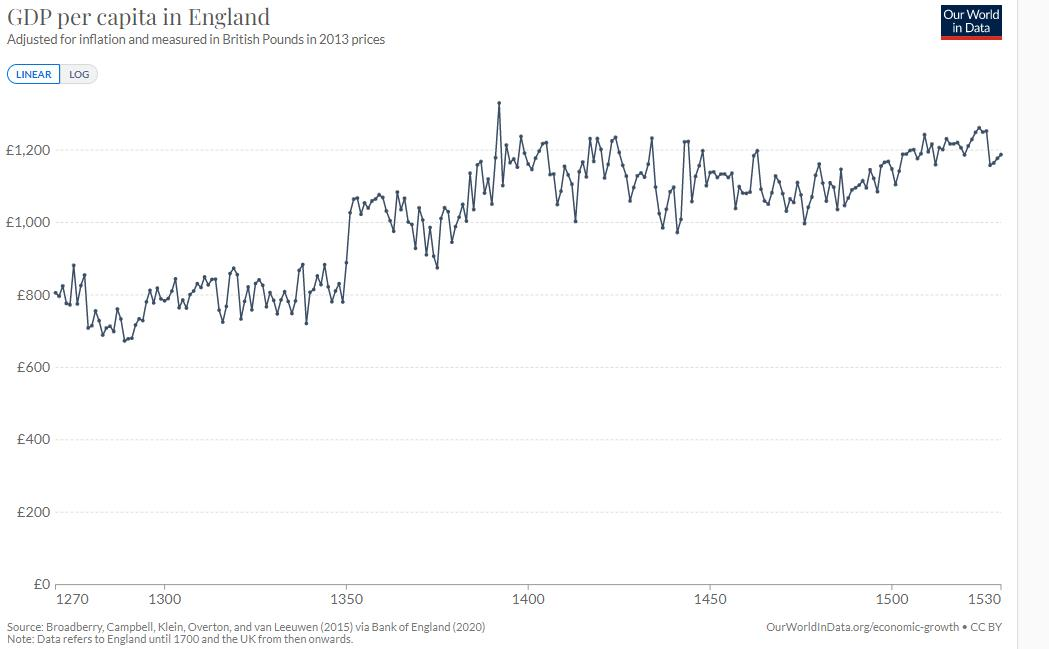
GDP per capita in England, from 1270 to 1530

The economy of England in the Middle Ages, from the Norman invasion in 1066, to the death of Henry VII in 1509, was fundamentally agricultural, though even before the invasion the local market economy was important to producers. Norman institutions, including serfdom, were superimposed on an existing system of open fields and mature, well-established towns involved in international trade. Over the five centuries of the Middle Ages, the English economy at first grew and then suffered an acute crisis, resulting in significant political and economic change. Despite economic dislocation in urban and extraction economies, including shifts in the holders of wealth and the location of these economies, the economic output of towns and mines developed and intensified over the period. By the end of the period, England had an economy dominated by rented farms controlled by gentry, and a thriving community of merchants and corporations.

The 12th and 13th centuries saw a small development of the English economy. This was partially driven by the growth in the population from around 1.5 million at the time of the creation of the Domesday Book in 1086 to between 4 and 5 million in 1300. England remained a primarily agricultural economy, with the rights of major landowners and the duties of serfs increasingly enshrined in English law. More land, much of it at the expense of the royal forests, was brought into production to feed the growing population or to produce wool for export to Europe. Many hundreds of new towns, some of them planned, sprung up across England, supporting the creation of guilds, charter fairs and other important medieval institutions. The descendants of the Jewish financiers who had first come to England with William the Conqueror played a significant role in the growing economy, along with the new Cistercian and Augustinian religious orders that came to become major players in the wool trade of the north. Mining increased in England, with the silver boom of the 12th century helping to fuel a fast-expanding currency.

Economic growth began to falter by the end of the 13th century, owing to a combination of over-population, land shortages and depleted soils. The loss of life in the Great Famine of 1315–17 shook the English economy severely and population growth ceased; the first outbreak of the Black Death in 1348 then killed around half the English population, with major implications for the post-plague economy. The agricultural sector shrank, with higher wages, lower prices and shrinking profits leading to the final demise of the old demesne system and the advent of the modern farming system of cash rents for lands. The Peasants Revolt of 1381 shook the older feudal order and limited the levels of royal taxation considerably for a century to come. The 15th century saw the growth of the English cloth industry and the establishment of a new class of international English merchant, increasingly based in London and the South-West, prospering at the expense of the older, shrinking economy of the eastern towns. These new trading systems brought about the end of many of the international fairs and the rise of the chartered company. Together with improvements in metalworking and shipbuilding, this represents the end of the medieval economy, and the beginnings of the early modern period in English economics.

== Invasion and the early Norman period (1066–1100) ==
William the Conqueror invaded England in 1066, defeating the Anglo-Saxon King Harold Godwinson at the Battle of Hastings and placing the country under Norman rule. This campaign was followed by fierce military operations known as the Harrying of the North in 1069–70, extending Norman authority across the north of England. William's system of government was broadly feudal in that the right to possess land was linked to service to the king, but in many other ways the invasion did little to alter the nature of the English economy. Most of the damage done in the invasion was in the north and the west of England, some of it still recorded as "wasteland" in 1086. Many of the key features of the English agricultural and financial system remained in place in the decades immediately after the conquest.

=== Agriculture and mining ===
==== English agriculture ====
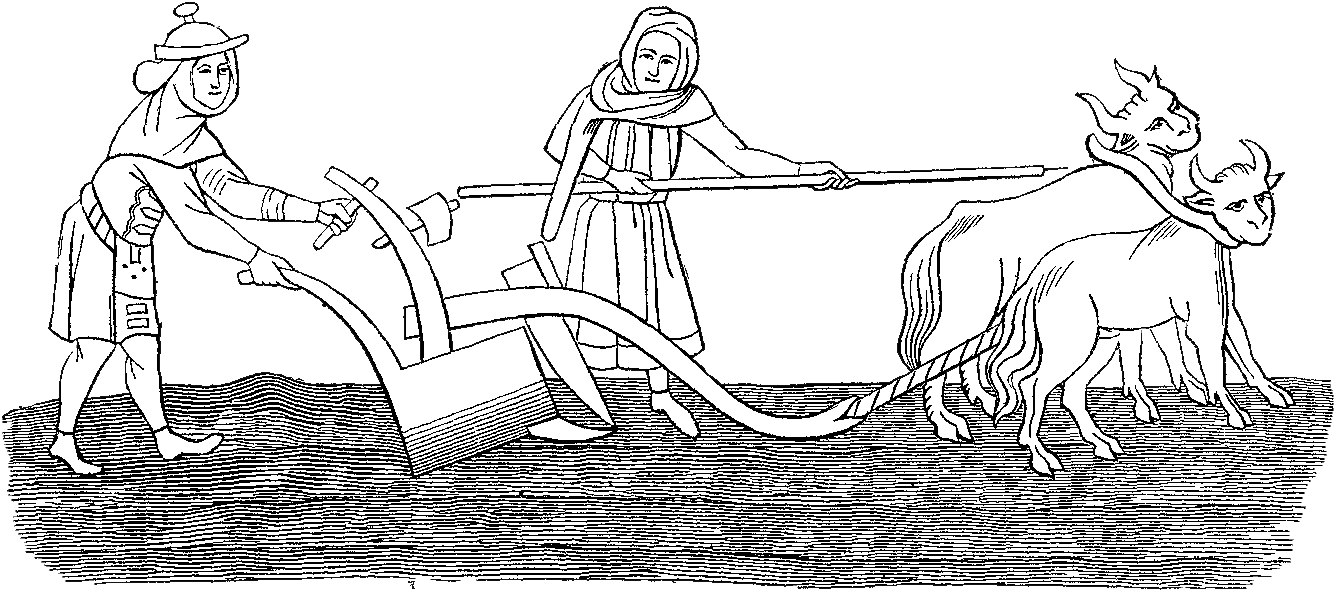
Ploughmen at work with oxen

Agriculture formed the bulk of the English economy at the time of the Norman invasion. Twenty years after the invasion, 35% of England was covered in arable land, 25% was put to pasture, 15% was covered by woodlands and the remaining 25% was predominantly moorland, fens and heaths. Wheat was the single most important arable crop, but rye, barley and oats were also cultivated extensively. In the more fertile parts of the country, such as the Thames valley, the Midlands and the east of England, legumes and beans were also cultivated. Sheep, cattle, oxen and pigs were kept on English holdings, although most of these breeds were much smaller than modern equivalents and most would have been slaughtered in winter.

==== Manorial system ====
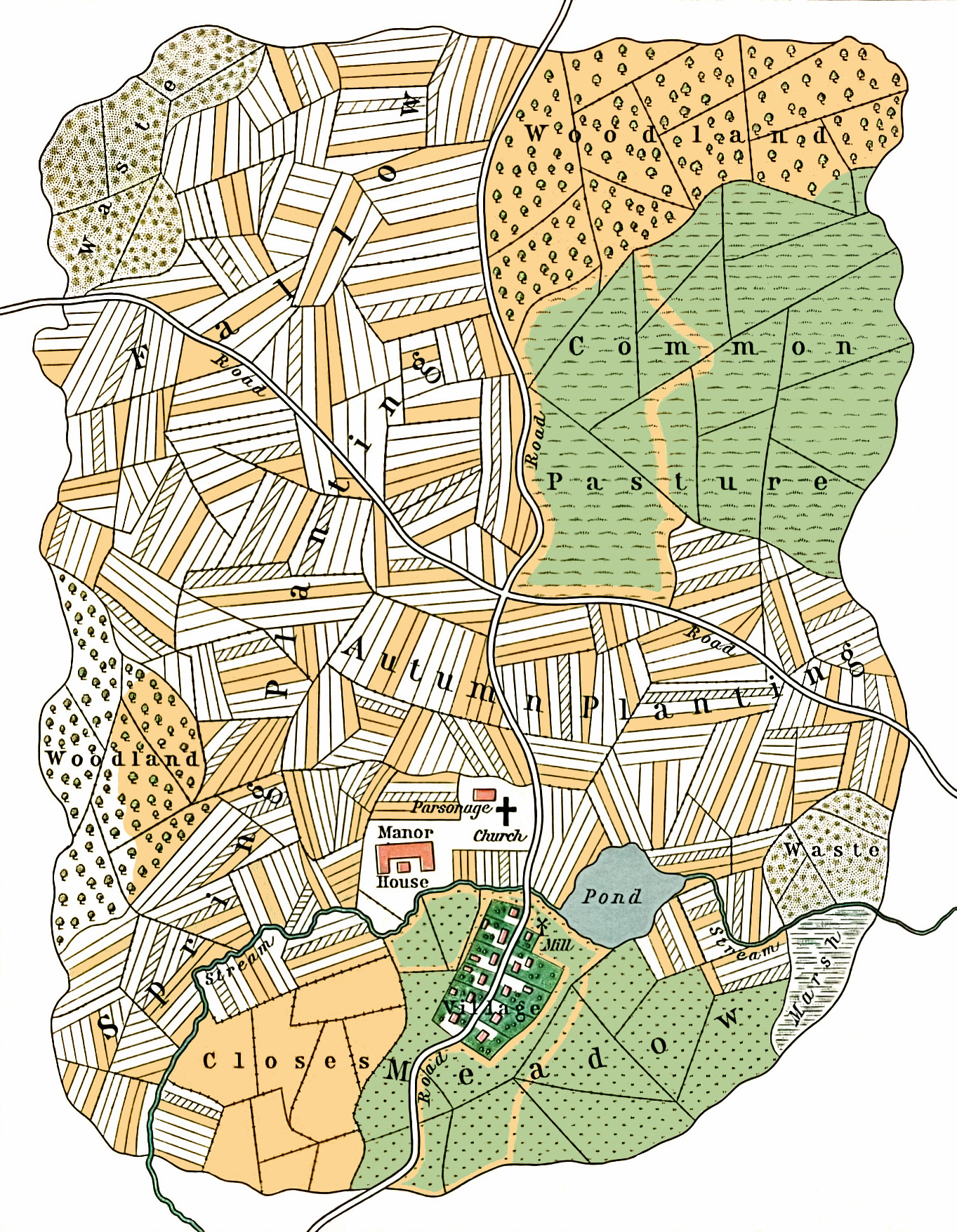
The open field system, central to many medieval English communities

In the century prior to the Norman invasion, England's great estates, owned by the king, bishops, monasteries and thegns, had been slowly broken up as a consequence of inheritance, wills, marriage settlements or church purchases. Most of the smaller landowning nobility lived on their properties and managed their own estates. The pre-Norman landscape had seen a trend away from isolated hamlets and towards larger villages engaged in arable cultivation in a band running north–south across England. These new villages had adopted an open field system in which fields were divided into small strips of land, individually owned, with crops rotated between the field each year and the local woodlands and other common lands carefully managed. Agricultural land on a manor was divided between some fields that the landowner would manage and cultivate directly, called demesne land, and the majority of the fields that would be cultivated by local peasants, who would pay rent to the landowner either through agricultural labour on the lord's demesne fields or through cash or produce. Around 6,000 watermills of varying power and efficiency had been built in order to grind flour, freeing up peasant labour for other more productive agricultural tasks. The early English economy was not a subsistence economy and many crops were grown by peasant farmers for sale to the early English towns.

The Normans initially did not significantly alter the operation of the manor or the village economy. William reassigned large tracts of land amongst the Norman elite, creating vast estates in some areas, particularly along the Welsh border and in Sussex. The biggest change in the years after the invasion was the rapid reduction in the number of slaves being held in England. In the 10th century slaves had been very numerous, although their number had begun to diminish as a result of economic and religious pressure. Nonetheless, the new Norman aristocracy proved harsh landlords. The wealthier, formerly more independent Anglo-Saxon peasants found themselves rapidly sinking down the economic hierarchy, swelling the numbers of unfree workers, or serfs, forbidden to leave their manor and seek alternative employment. Those Anglo-Saxon nobles who had survived the invasion itself were rapidly assimilated into the Norman elite or economically crushed.

==== Creation of the forests ====
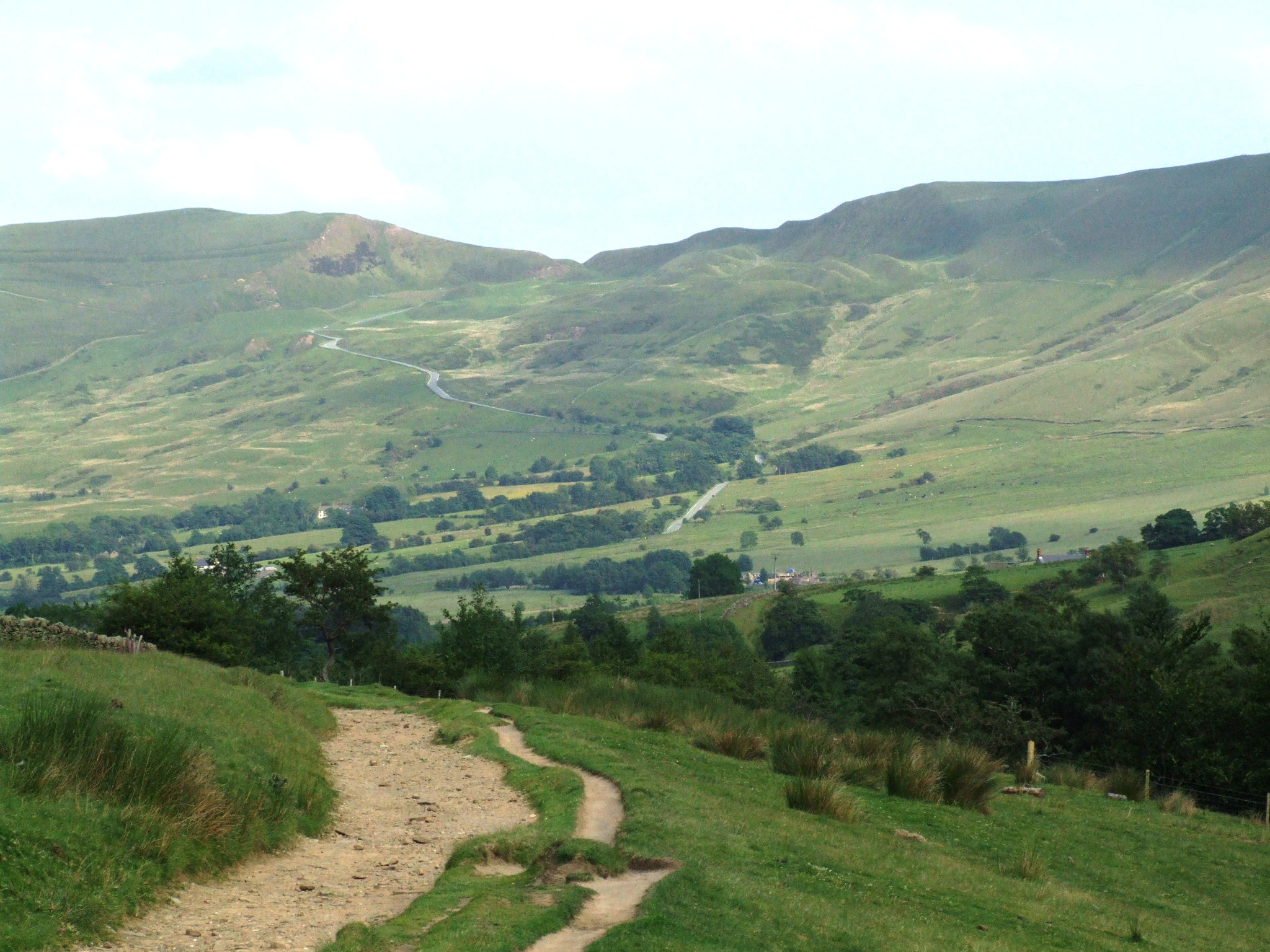
The Forest of High Peak, a moorland forest established for royal lead mining

The Normans also established the royal forests. In Anglo-Saxon times there had been special woods for hunting called "hays", but the Norman forests were much larger and backed by legal mandate. The new forests were not necessarily heavily wooded but were defined instead by their protection and exploitation by the crown. The Norman forests were subject to special royal jurisdiction; forest law was "harsh and arbitrary, a matter purely for the King's will". Forests were expected to supply the king with hunting grounds, raw materials, goods and money. Revenue from forest rents and fines came to become extremely significant and forest wood was used for castles and royal ship building. Several forests played a key role in mining, such as the iron mining and working in the Forest of Dean and lead mining in the Forest of High Peak. Several other groups bound up economically with forests; many monasteries had special rights in particular forests, for example for hunting or tree felling. The royal forests were accompanied by the rapid creation of locally owned parks and chases.

=== Trade, manufacturing and the towns ===
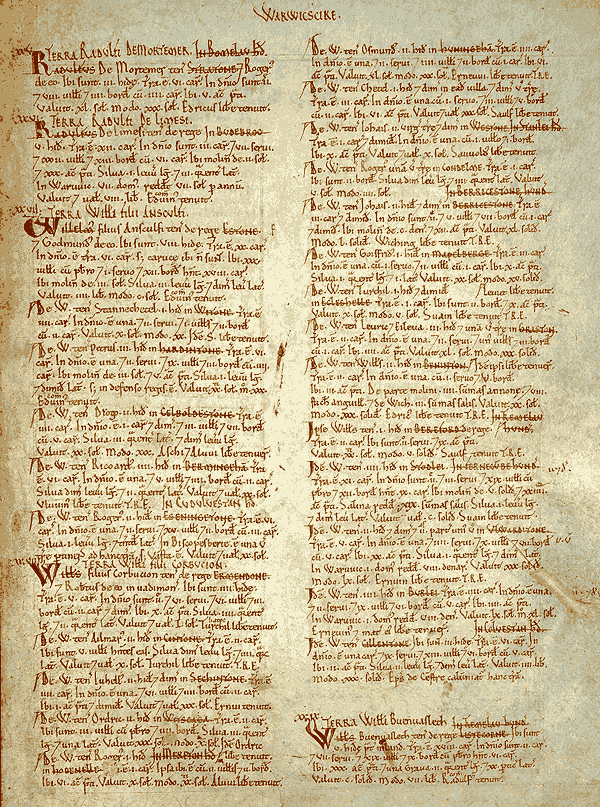
A page of the Domesday Book, which captures the economic condition of England in 1086

Although primarily rural, England had a number of old, economically important towns in 1066. A large amount of trade came through the Eastern towns, including London, York, Winchester, Lincoln, Norwich, Ipswich and Thetford. Much of this trade was with France, the Low Countries and Germany, but the North-East of England traded with partners as far away as Sweden. Cloth was already being imported to England before the invasion through the mercery trade.

Some towns, such as York, suffered from Norman sacking during William's northern campaigns. Other towns saw the widespread demolition of houses to make room for new motte and bailey fortifications, as was the case in Lincoln. The Norman invasion also brought significant economic changes with the arrival of the first Jews to English cities. William I brought over wealthy Jews from the Rouen community in Normandy to settle in London, apparently to carry out financial services for the crown. In the years immediately after the invasion, a lot of wealth was drawn out of England in various ways by the Norman rulers and reinvested in Normandy, making William immensely wealthy as an individual ruler.

The minting of coins was decentralised in the Saxon period; every borough was mandated to have a mint and therefore a centre for trading in bullion. Nonetheless, there was strict royal control over these moneyers, and coin dies could only be made in London. William retained this process and generated a high standard of Norman coins, leading to the use of the term "sterling" as the name for the Norman silver coins.

=== Governance and taxation ===
William I inherited the Anglo-Saxon system in which the king drew his revenues from: a mixture of customs; profits from re-minting coinage; fines; profits from his own demesne lands; and the system of English land-based taxation called the geld. William reaffirmed this system, enforcing collection of the geld through his new system of sheriffs and increasing the taxes on trade. William was also famous for commissioning the Domesday Book in 1086, a vast document which attempted to record the economic condition of his new kingdom.

== Mid-medieval growth (1100–1290) ==
The 12th and 13th centuries were a period of huge economic growth in England. The population of England rose from around 1.5 million in 1086 to around 4 or 5 million in 1300, stimulating increased agricultural outputs and the export of raw materials to Europe. In contrast to the previous two centuries, England was relatively secure from invasion. Except for the years of the Anarchy, most military conflicts either had only localised economic impact or proved only temporarily disruptive. English economic thinking remained conservative, seeing the economy as consisting of three groups: the ordines, those who fought, or the nobility; laboratores, those who worked, in particular the peasantry; and oratores, those who prayed, or the clerics. Trade and merchants played little part in this model and were frequently vilified at the start of the period, although they were increasingly tolerated towards the end of the 13th century.

=== Agriculture, fishing and mining ===
==== English agriculture and the landscape ====
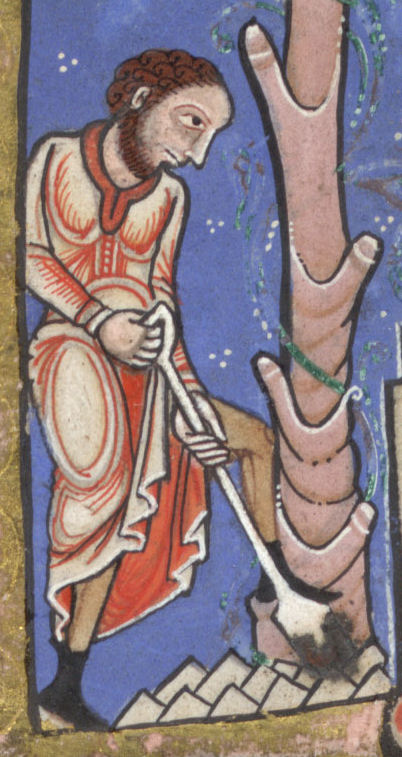
An English serf at work digging, c. 1170

Agriculture remained by far the most important part of the English economy during the 12th and 13th centuries. There remained a wide variety in English agriculture, influenced by local geography; in areas where grain could not be grown, other resources were exploited instead. In the Weald, for example, agriculture centred on grazing animals on the woodland pastures, whilst in the Fens fishing and bird-hunting was supplemented by basket-making and peat-cutting. In some locations, such as Lincolnshire and Droitwich, salt manufacture was important, including production for the export market. Fishing became an important trade along the English coast, especially in Great Yarmouth and Scarborough, and the herring was a particularly popular catch; salted at the coast, it could then be shipped inland or exported to Europe. Piracy between competing English fishing fleets was not unknown during the period. Sheep were the most common farm animal in England during the period, their numbers doubling by the 14th century. Sheep became increasingly widely used for wool, particularly in the Welsh borders, Lincolnshire and the Pennines. Pigs remained popular on holdings because of their ability to scavenge for food. Oxen remained the primary plough animal, with horses used more widely on farms in the south of England towards the end of the 12th century. Rabbits were introduced from France in the 13th century and farmed for their meat in special warrens.

The underlying productivity of English agriculture remained low, despite the increases in food production. Wheat prices fluctuated heavily year to year, depending on local harvests; up to a third of the grain produced in England was potentially for sale, and much of it ended up in the growing towns. Despite their involvement in the market, even the wealthiest peasants prioritised spending on housing and clothing, with little left for other personal consumption. Records of household belongings show most possessing only "old, worn-out and mended utensils" and tools.

The royal forests grew in size for much of the 12th century, before contracting in the late 13th and early 14th centuries. Henry I extended the size and scope of royal forests, especially in Yorkshire; after the Anarchy of 1135–53, Henry II continued to expand the forests until they comprised around 20% of England. In 1217 the Charter of the Forest was enacted, in part to mitigate the worst excesses of royal jurisdiction, and established a more structured range of fines and punishments for peasants who illegally hunted or felled trees in the forests. By the end of the century the king had come under increasing pressure to reduce the size of the royal forests, leading to the "Great Perambulation" around 1300; this significantly reduced the extent to the forests, and by 1334 they were only around two-thirds the size they had been in 1250. Royal revenue streams from the shrinking forests diminished considerably in the early 14th century.

==== Development of estate management ====
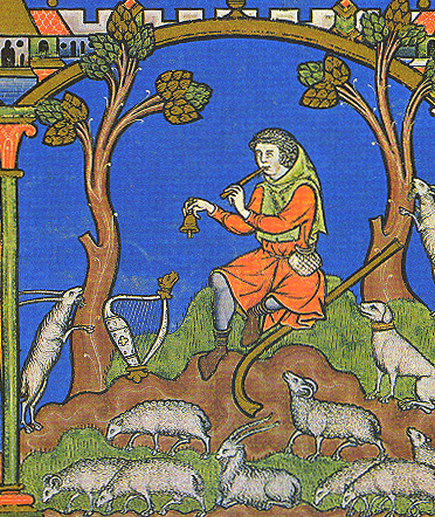
Sheep, shown here c. 1250, became increasingly important to English agriculture.

The Normans retained and reinforced the manorial system with its division between demesne and peasant lands paid for in agricultural labour. Landowners could profit from the sales of goods from their demesne lands and a local lord could also expect to receive income from fines and local customs, whilst more powerful nobles profited from their own regional courts and rights.

During the 12th century major landowners tended to rent out their demesne lands for money, motivated by static prices for produce and the chaos of the Anarchy between 1135 and 1153. This practice began to alter in the 1180s and 1190s, spurred by the greater political stability. In the first years of John's reign, agricultural prices almost doubled, at once increasing the potential profits on the demesne estates and also increasing the cost of living for the landowners themselves. Landowners now attempted wherever possible to bring their demesne lands back into direct management, creating a system of administrators and officials to run their new system of estates.

New land was brought into cultivation to meet demand for food, including drained marshes and fens, such as Romney Marsh, the Somerset Levels and the Fens; royal forests from the late 12th century onwards; and poorer lands in the north, south-west and in the Welsh Marches. The first windmills in England began to appear along the south and east coasts in the 12th century, expanding in number in the 13th, adding to the mechanised power available to the manors. By 1300 it has been estimated that there were more than 10,000 watermills in England, used both for grinding corn and for fulling cloth. Fish ponds were created on most estates to provide freshwater fish for the consumption of the nobility and church; these ponds were extremely expensive to create and maintain. Improved ways of running estates began to be circulated and were popularised in Walter de Henley's famous book Le Dite de Hosebondrie, written around 1280. In some regions and under some landowners, investment and innovation increased yields significantly through improved ploughing and fertilisers – particularly in Norfolk, where yields eventually equalled later 18th-century levels.

==== Role of the Church in agriculture ====
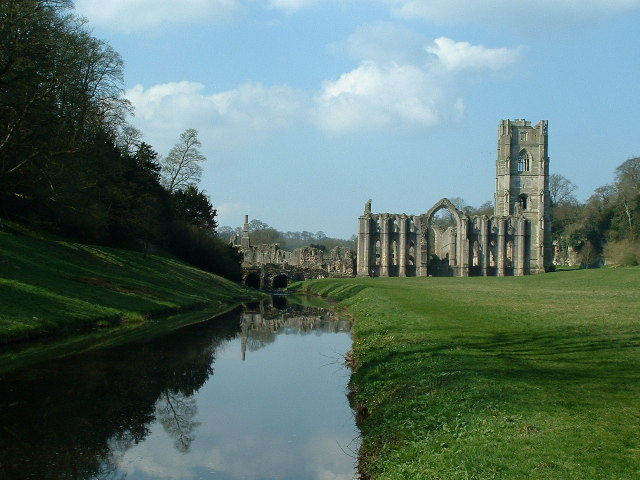
Fountains Abbey, one of the new Cistercian monasteries built in the medieval period with wealth derived from agriculture and trade

The Church in England was a major landowner throughout the medieval period and played an important part in the development of agriculture and rural trade in the first two centuries of Norman rule. The Cistercian order first arrived in England in 1128, establishing around 80 new monastic houses over the next few years; the wealthy Augustinians also established themselves and expanded to occupy around 150 houses, all supported by agricultural estates, many of them in the north of England. By the 13th century these and other orders were acquiring new lands and had become major economic players both as landowners and as middlemen in the expanding wool trade. In particular, the Cistercians led the development of the grange system. Granges were separate manors in which the fields were all cultivated by the monastic officials, rather than being divided up between demesne and rented fields, and became known for trialling new agricultural techniques during the period. Elsewhere, many monasteries had significant economic impact on the landscape, such as the monks of Glastonbury, responsible for the draining of the Somerset Levels to create new pasture land.

The military crusading order of the Knights Templar also held extensive property in England, bringing in around £2,200 per annum by the time of their fall. It comprised primarily rural holdings rented out for cash, but also included some urban properties in London. Following the dissolution of the Templar order in France by Philip IV of France, Edward II ordered their properties to be seized and passed to the Hospitaller order in 1313, but in practice many properties were taken by local landowners and the hospital was still attempting to reclaim them twenty-five years later.

The Church was responsible for the system of tithes, a levy of 10% on "all agrarian produce... other natural products gained via labour... wages received by servants and labourers, and to the profits of rural merchants". Tithes gathered in the form of produce could be either consumed by the recipient, or sold on and bartered for other resources. The tithe was relatively onerous for the typical peasant, although in many instances the actual levy fell below the desired 10%. Many clergy moved to the towns as part of the urban growth of the period, and by 1300 around one in twenty city dwellers was a clergyman. One effect of the tithe was to transfer a considerable amount of agriculture wealth into the cities, where it was then spent by these urban clergy. The need to sell tithe produce that could not be consumed by the local clergy also spurred the growth of trade.

==== Expansion of mining ====
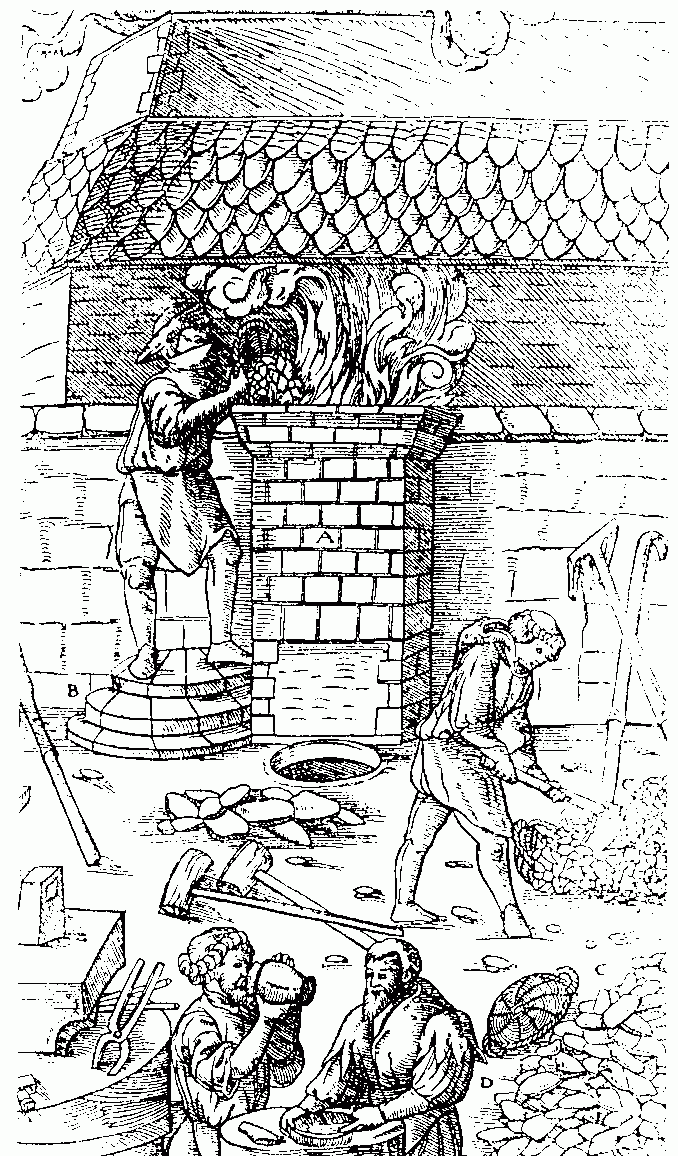
Early iron-smelting using a bloomery

Mining did not make up a large part of the English medieval economy, but the 12th and 13th centuries saw an increased demand for metals in the country, thanks to the considerable population growth and building construction, including the great cathedrals and churches. Four metals were mined commercially in England during the period, namely iron, tin, lead and silver; coal was also mined from the 13th century onwards, using a variety of refining techniques.

Iron mining occurred in several locations, including the main English centre in the Forest of Dean, as well as in Durham and the Weald. Some iron to meet English demand was also imported from the continent, especially by the late 13th century. By the end of the 12th century, the older method of acquiring iron ore through strip mining was being supplemented by more advanced techniques, including tunnels, trenches and bell-pits. Iron ore was usually locally processed at a bloomery, and by the 14th century the first water-powered iron forge in England was built at Chingley. As a result of the diminishing woodlands and consequent increases in the cost of both wood and charcoal, demand for coal increased in the 12th century and it began to be commercially produced from bell-pits and strip mining.

A silver boom occurred in England after the discovery of silver near Carlisle in 1133. Huge quantities of silver were produced from a semicircle of mines reaching across Cumberland, Durham and Northumberland – up to three to four tonnes of silver were mined each year, more than ten times the previous annual production across the whole of Europe. The result was a local economic boom and a major uplift to 12th-century royal finances. Tin mining was centred in Cornwall and Devon, exploiting alluvial deposits and governed by the special Stannary Courts and Parliaments. Tin formed a valuable export good, initially to Germany and then later in the 14th century to the Low Countries. Lead was usually mined as a by-product of mining for silver, with mines in Yorkshire, Durham and the north, as well as in Devon. Economically fragile, the lead mines usually survived as a result of being subsidised by silver production.

=== Trade, manufacturing and the towns ===
==== Growth of English towns ====
The medieval plan for Liverpool, a new English town founded by order of King John in 1207

After the end of the Anarchy, the number of small towns in England began to increase sharply. By 1297, 120 new towns had been established, and in 1350 – by when the expansion had effectively ceased – there were around 500 towns in England. Many of these new towns were centrally planned: Richard I created Portsmouth, John founded Liverpool, and successive monarchs followed with Harwich, Stony Stratford, Dunstable, Royston, Baldock, Wokingham, Maidenhead and Reigate. The new towns were usually located with access to trade routes in mind, rather than defence, and the streets were laid out to make access to the town's market convenient. A growing percentage of England's population lived in urban areas; estimates suggest that this rose from around 5.5% in 1086 to up to 10% in 1377.

London held a special status within the English economy. The nobility purchased and consumed many luxury goods and services in the capital, and as early as the 1170s the London markets were providing exotic products such as spices, incense, palm oil, gems, silks, furs and foreign weapons. London was also an important hub for industrial activity; it had many blacksmiths making a wide range of goods, including decorative ironwork and early clocks. Pewter-working, using English tin and lead, was also widespread in London during the period. The provincial towns also had a substantial number of trades by the end of the 13th century – a large town like Coventry, for example, contained over three hundred different specialist occupations, and a smaller town such as Durham could support some sixty different professions. The increasing wealth of the nobility and the church was reflected in the widespread building of cathedrals and other prestigious buildings in the larger towns, in turn making use of lead from English mines for roofing.

Land transport remained much more expensive than river or sea transport during the period. Many towns in this period, including York, Exeter and Lincoln, were linked to the oceans by navigable rivers and could act as seaports, with Bristol's port coming to dominate the lucrative trade in wine with Gascony by the 13th century, but shipbuilding generally remained on a modest scale and economically unimportant to England at this time. Transport remained very costly in comparison to the overall price of products. By the 13th century, groups of common carriers ran carting businesses, and carting brokers existed in London to link traders and carters. These used the four major land routes crossing England: Ermine Street, the Fosse Way, Icknield Street and Watling Street. A large number of bridges were built during the 12th century to improve the trade network.

In the 13th century, England was still primarily supplying raw materials for export to Europe, rather than finished or processed goods. There were some exceptions, such as very high-quality cloths from Stamford and Lincoln, including the famous "Lincoln Scarlet" dyed cloth. Despite royal efforts to encourage it, however, barely any English cloth was being exported by 1347.

==== Expansion of the money supply ====
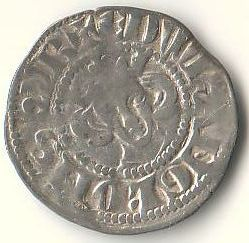
An Edward I silver penny from Lincoln; Edward increased the controls on the minting of coins begun under Henry II, creating the Master of the Mint.

There was a gradual reduction in the number of locations allowed to mint coins in England; under Henry II, only 30 boroughs were still able to use their own moneyers, and the tightening of controls continued throughout the 13th century. By the reign of Edward I there were only nine mints outside London and the king created a new official called the Master of the Mint to oversee these and the thirty furnaces operating in London to meet the demand for new coins. The amount of money in circulation hugely increased in this period; before the Norman invasion there had been around £50,000 in circulation as coin, but by 1311 this had risen to more than £1 million. At any particular point in time, though, much of this currency might be being stored prior to being used to support military campaigns or to be sent overseas to meet payments, resulting in bursts of temporary deflation as coins ceased to circulate within the English economy. One physical consequence of the growth in the coinage was that coins had to be manufactured in large numbers, being moved in barrels and sacks to be stored in local treasuries for royal use as the king travelled.

==== Rise of the guilds ====
The first English guilds emerged during the early 12th century. These guilds were fraternities of craftsmen that set out to manage their local affairs including "prices, workmanship, the welfare of its workers, and the suppression of interlopers and sharp practices". Amongst these early guilds were the "guilds merchants", who ran the local markets in towns and represented the merchant community in discussions with the crown. Other early guilds included the "craft guilds", representing specific trades. By 1130 there were major weavers' guilds in six English towns, as well as a fullers' guild in Winchester. Over the following decades more guilds were created, often becoming increasingly involved in both local and national politics, although the guilds merchants were largely replaced by official groups established by new royal charters.

The craft guilds required relatively stable markets and a relative equality of income and opportunity amongst their members to function effectively. By the 14th century these conditions were increasingly uncommon. The first strains were seen in London, where the old guild system began to collapse – more trade was being conducted at a national level, making it hard for craftsmen to both manufacture goods and trade in them, and there were growing disparities in incomes between the richer and poorer craftsmen. As a result, under Edward III many guilds became companies or livery companies, chartered companies focusing on trade and finance, leaving the guild structures to represent the interests of the smaller, poorer manufacturers.

==== Merchants and the development of the charter fairs ====
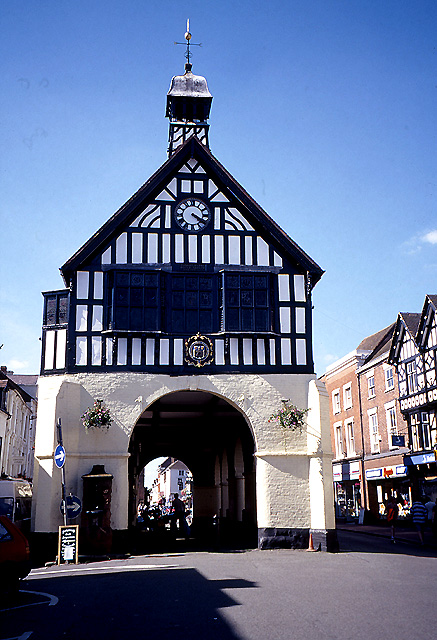
The market place at Bridgnorth, one of many medieval English towns to be granted the right to hold fairs, in this case annually on the feast of the Translation of St. Leonard

The period also saw the development of charter fairs in England, which reached their heyday in the 13th century. From the 12th century onwards, many English towns acquired a charter from the Crown allowing them to hold an annual fair, usually serving a regional or local customer base and lasting for two or three days. The practice increased in the next century and over 2,200 charters were issued to markets and fairs by English kings between 1200 and 1270. Fairs grew in popularity as the international wool trade increased: the fairs allowed English wool producers and ports on the east coast to engage with visiting foreign merchants, circumnavigating those English merchants in London keen to make a profit as middlemen. At the same time, wealthy magnate consumers in England began to use the new fairs as a way to buy goods like spices, wax, preserved fish and foreign cloth in bulk from the international merchants at the fairs, again bypassing the usual London merchants.

Some fairs grew into major international events, falling into a set sequence during the economic year, with the Stamford fair in Lent, St Ives' in Easter, Boston's in July, Winchester's in September and Northampton's in November, with the many smaller fairs falling in-between. Although not as large as the famous Champagne fairs in France, these English "great fairs" were still huge events; St Ives' Great Fair, for example, drew merchants from Flanders, Brabant, Norway, Germany and France for a four-week event each year, turning the normally small town into "a major commercial emporium".

The structure of the fairs reflected the importance of foreign merchants in the English economy and by 1273 only one-third of the English wool trade was actually controlled by English merchants. Between 1280 and 1320 the trade was primarily dominated by Italian merchants, but by the early 14th century German merchants had begun to present serious competition to the Italians. The Germans formed a self-governing alliance of merchants in London called the "Hanse of the Steelyard" – the eventual Hanseatic League – and their role was confirmed under the Great Charter of 1303, which exempted them from paying the customary tolls for foreign merchants. (Note: Hanse is the old English word for "group".) One response to this was the creation of the Company of the Staple, a group of merchants established in English-held Calais in 1314 with royal approval, who were granted a monopoly on wool sales to Europe.

==== Jewish contribution to the English economy ====
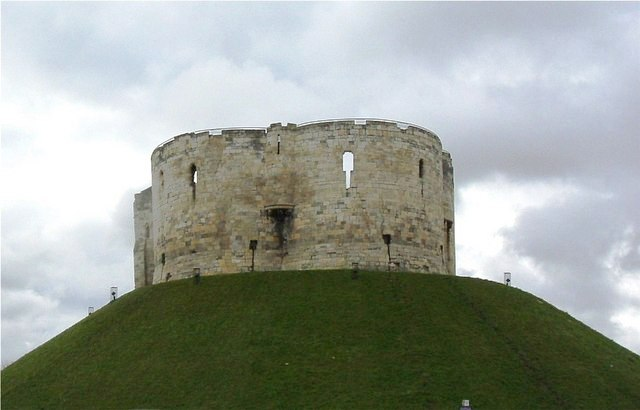
Clifford's Tower in the city of York, a major hub for Jewish economic activity and the site of an early Jewish pogrom in 1190

The Jewish community in England continued to provide essential money-lending and banking services that were otherwise banned by the usury laws, and grew in the 12th century by Jewish immigrants fleeing the fighting around Rouen. The Jewish community spread beyond London to eleven major English cities, primarily the major trading hubs in the east of England with functioning mints, all with suitable castles for protection of the often persecuted Jewish minority. By the time of the Anarchy and the reign of Stephen, the communities were flourishing and providing financial loans to the king.

Under Henry II, the Jewish financial community continued to grow richer still. All major towns had Jewish centres, and even smaller towns, such as Windsor, saw visits by travelling Jewish merchants. Henry II used the Jewish community as "instruments for the collection of money for the Crown", and placed them under royal protection. The Jewish community at York lent extensively to fund the Cistercian order's acquisition of land and prospered considerably. Some Jewish merchants grew extremely wealthy, Aaron of Lincoln so much that upon his death a special royal department had to be established to unpick his financial holdings and affairs.

By the end of Henry's reign the king ceased to borrow from the Jewish community and instead turned to an aggressive campaign of tallage taxation and fines. Financial and anti-Semite violence grew under Richard I. After the massacre of the York community, in which numerous financial records were destroyed, seven towns were nominated to separately store Jewish bonds and money records and this arrangement ultimately evolved into the Exchequer of the Jews. After an initially peaceful start to John's reign, the king again began to extort money from the Jewish community, imprisoning the wealthier members, including Isaac of Norwich, until a huge, new taillage was paid. During the Baron's War of 1215–17, the Jews were subjected to fresh anti-Semitic attacks. Henry III restored some order and Jewish money-lending became sufficiently successful again to allow fresh taxation. The Jewish community became poorer towards the end of the century and was finally expelled from England in 1290 by Edward I, being largely replaced by foreign merchants.

=== Governance and taxation ===
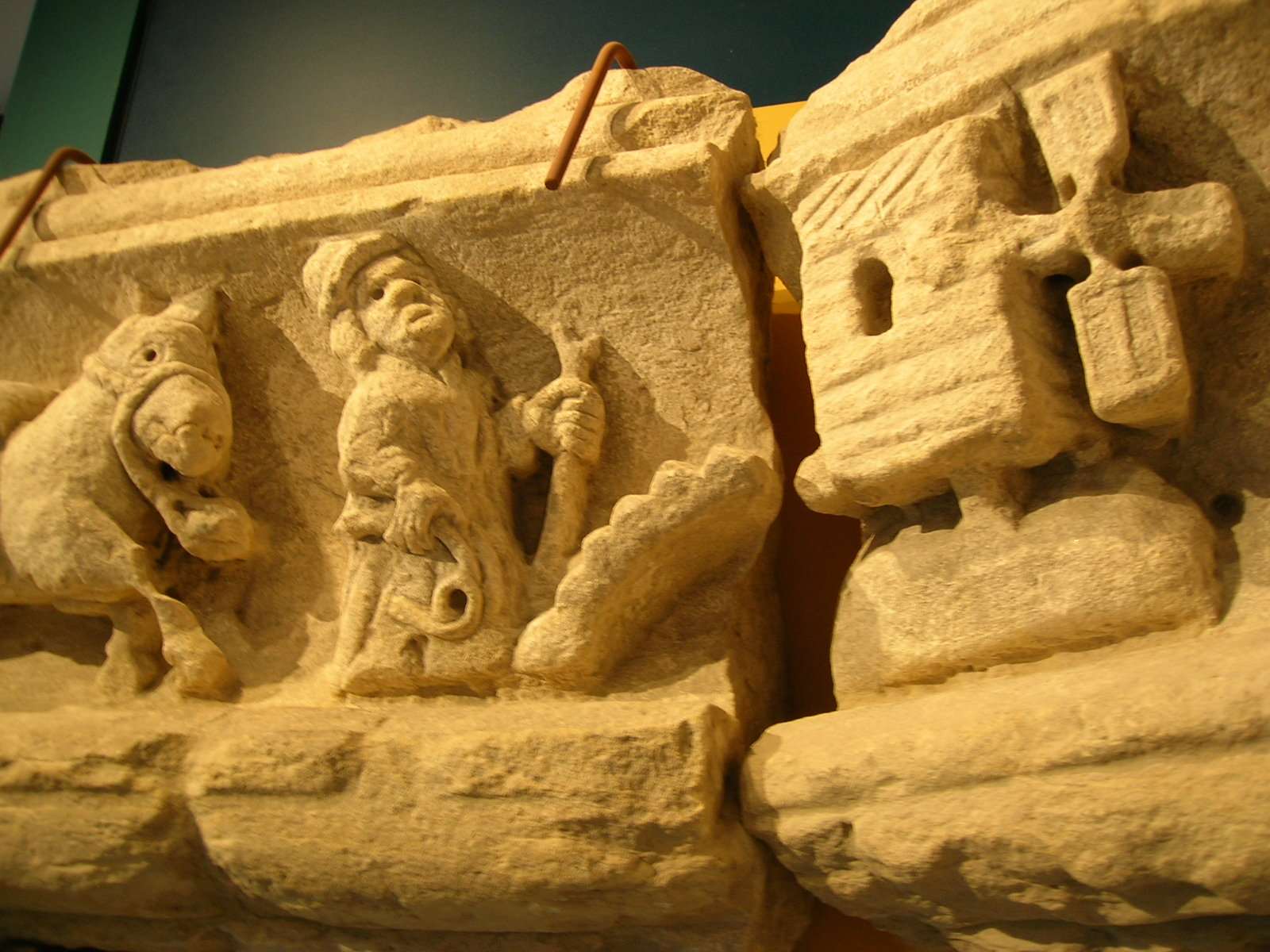
A medieval carving from Rievaulx Abbey showing one of the many new windmills established during the 13th century

During the 12th century the Norman kings attempted to formalise the feudal governance system initially created after the invasion. After the invasion the king had enjoyed a combination of income from his own demesne lands, the Anglo-Saxon geld tax and fines. Successive kings found that they needed additional revenues, especially in order to pay for mercenary forces. One way of doing this was to exploit the feudal system, and kings adopted the French feudal aid model, a levy of money imposed on feudal subordinates when necessary; another method was to exploit the scutage system, in which feudal military service could be transmuted to a cash payment to the king. Taxation was also an option, although the old geld tax was increasingly ineffective due to a growing number of exemptions. Instead, a succession of kings created alternative land taxes, such as the tallage and carucage taxes. These were increasingly unpopular and, along with the feudal charges, were condemned and constrained in Magna Carta of 1215. As part of the formalisation of the royal finances, Henry I created the Chancellor of the Exchequer, a post which would lead to the maintenance of the Pipe rolls, a set of royal financial records of lasting significance to historians in tracking both royal finances and medieval prices.

Royal revenue streams still proved insufficient and from the middle of the 13th century there was a shift away from the earlier land-based tax system towards one based on a mixture of indirect and direct taxation. At the same time, Henry III had introduced the practice of consulting with leading nobles on tax issues, leading to the system whereby the Parliament of England agreed on new taxes when required. In 1275, the "Great and Ancient Custom" began to tax woollen products and hides, with the Great Charter of 1303 imposing additional levies on foreign merchants in England, with the poundage tax introduced in 1347. In 1340, the discredited tallage tax system was finally abolished by Edward III. Assessing the total impact of changes to royal revenues between 1086 and 1290 is difficult. At best, Edward I was struggling in 1300 to match in real terms the revenues that Henry II had enjoyed in 1100, and considering the growth in the size of the English economy, the king's share of the national income had dropped considerably.

In the English towns the burgage tenure for urban properties was established early on in the medieval period, and was based primarily on tenants paying cash rents rather than providing labour services. Further development of a set of taxes that could be raised by the towns included murage for walls, pavage for streets, and pontage, a temporary tax for the repair of bridges. Combined with the lex mercatoria, which was a set of codes and customary practices governing trading, these provided a reasonable basis for the economic governance of the towns.

The 12th century also saw a concerted attempt to curtail the remaining rights of unfree peasant workers and to set out their labour rents more explicitly in the form of the English Common Law. This process resulted in Magna Carta explicitly authorising feudal landowners to settle law cases concerning feudal labour and fines through their own manorial courts rather than through the royal courts. These class relationships between lords and unfree peasants had complex economic implications. Peasant workers resented being unfree, but having continuing access to agricultural land was also important. Under those rare circumstances where peasants were offered a choice between freedom but no land, and continued servitude, not all chose freedom and a minority chose to remain in servitude on the land. Lords benefited economically from their control of the manorial courts and dominating the courts made it easier to manipulate land ownership and rights in their own favour when land became in particularly short supply at the end of this period. Many of the labour duties lords could compel from the local peasant communities became less useful over the period. Duties were fixed by custom, inflexible and understandably resented by the workers involved. As a result, by the end of the 13th century the productivity of such forced labour was significantly lower than that of free labour employed to do the same task. A number of lords responded by seeking to commute the duties of unfree peasants to cash alternatives, with the aim of hiring labour instead.

== Mid-medieval economic crisis – the Great Famine and the Black Death (1290–1350) ==
The Black Death reached England in 1348 from Europe.

=== Great Famine ===
The Great Famine of 1315 began a number of acute crises in the English agrarian economy. The famine centred on a sequence of harvest failures in 1315, 1316 and 1321 and combined with an outbreak of murrain, a sickness amongst sheep and oxen in 1319–21 and the fatal ergotism, a fungus amongst the remaining stocks of wheat. Many people died in the ensuing famine, and the peasantry were said to have been forced to eat horses, dogs and cats as well as conducted cannibalism against children, although these last reports are usually considered to be exaggerations. Poaching and encroachment on the royal forests surged, sometimes on a mass scale. Sheep and cattle numbers fell by up to a half, significantly reducing the availability of wool and meat, and food prices almost doubled, with grain prices particularly inflated. Food prices remained at similar levels for the next decade. Salt prices also increased sharply due to the wet weather.

Various factors exacerbated the crisis. Economic growth had already begun to slow significantly in the years prior to the crisis and the English rural population was increasingly under economic stress, with around half the peasantry estimated to possess insufficient land to provide them with a secure livelihood. Where additional land was being brought into cultivation, or existing land cultivated more intensively, the soil may have become exhausted and useless. Bad weather also played an important part in the disaster; 1315–16 and 1318 saw torrential rains and an incredibly cold winter, which in combination badly impacted on harvests and stored supplies. The rains of these years were followed by drought in the 1320s and another fierce winter in 1321, complicating recovery. Disease, independent of the famine, was also high during the period, striking at the wealthier as well as the poorer classes. The commencement of war with France in 1337 only added to the economic difficulties. The Great Famine firmly reversed the population growth of the 12th and 13th centuries and left a domestic economy that was "profoundly shaken, but not destroyed".

=== Black Death ===
The Black Death epidemic first arrived in England in 1348, re-occurring in waves during 1360–62, 1368–69, 1375 and more sporadically thereafter. The most immediate economic impact of this disaster was the widespread loss of life, between around 27% mortality amongst the upper classes, to 40–70% amongst the peasantry. (Note: The precise mortality figures for the Black Death have been debated at length for many years.) Despite the very high loss of life, few settlements were abandoned during the epidemic itself, but many were badly affected or nearly eliminated altogether. The medieval authorities did their best to respond in an organised fashion, but the economic disruption was immense. Building work ceased and many mining operations paused. In the short term, efforts were taken by the authorities to control wages and enforce pre-epidemic working conditions. Coming on top of the previous years of famine, however, the longer-term economic implications were profound. In contrast to the previous centuries of rapid growth, the English population would not begin to recover for over a century, despite the many positive reasons for a resurgence. The crisis would dramatically affect English agriculture, wages and prices for the remainder of the medieval period.

== Late medieval economic recovery (1350–1509) ==
The events of the crisis between 1290 and 1348 and the subsequent epidemics produced many challenges for the English economy. In the decades after the disaster, the economic and social issues arising from the Black Death combined with the costs of the Hundred Years War resulted in the Peasants Revolt of 1381. Although the revolt was suppressed, it undermined many of the vestiges of the feudal economic order, and the countryside became dominated by estates organised as farms, frequently owned or rented by the new economic class of the gentry. The English agricultural economy remained depressed throughout the 15th century; growth at this time came from the greatly increased English cloth trade and manufacturing. The economic consequences of this varied considerably from region to region, but generally London, the South and the West prospered at the expense of the Eastern and the older cities. The role of merchants and trade became increasingly seen as important to the country, and usury gradually became more widely accepted, with English economic thinking increasingly influenced by Renaissance humanist theories.

=== Governance and taxation ===
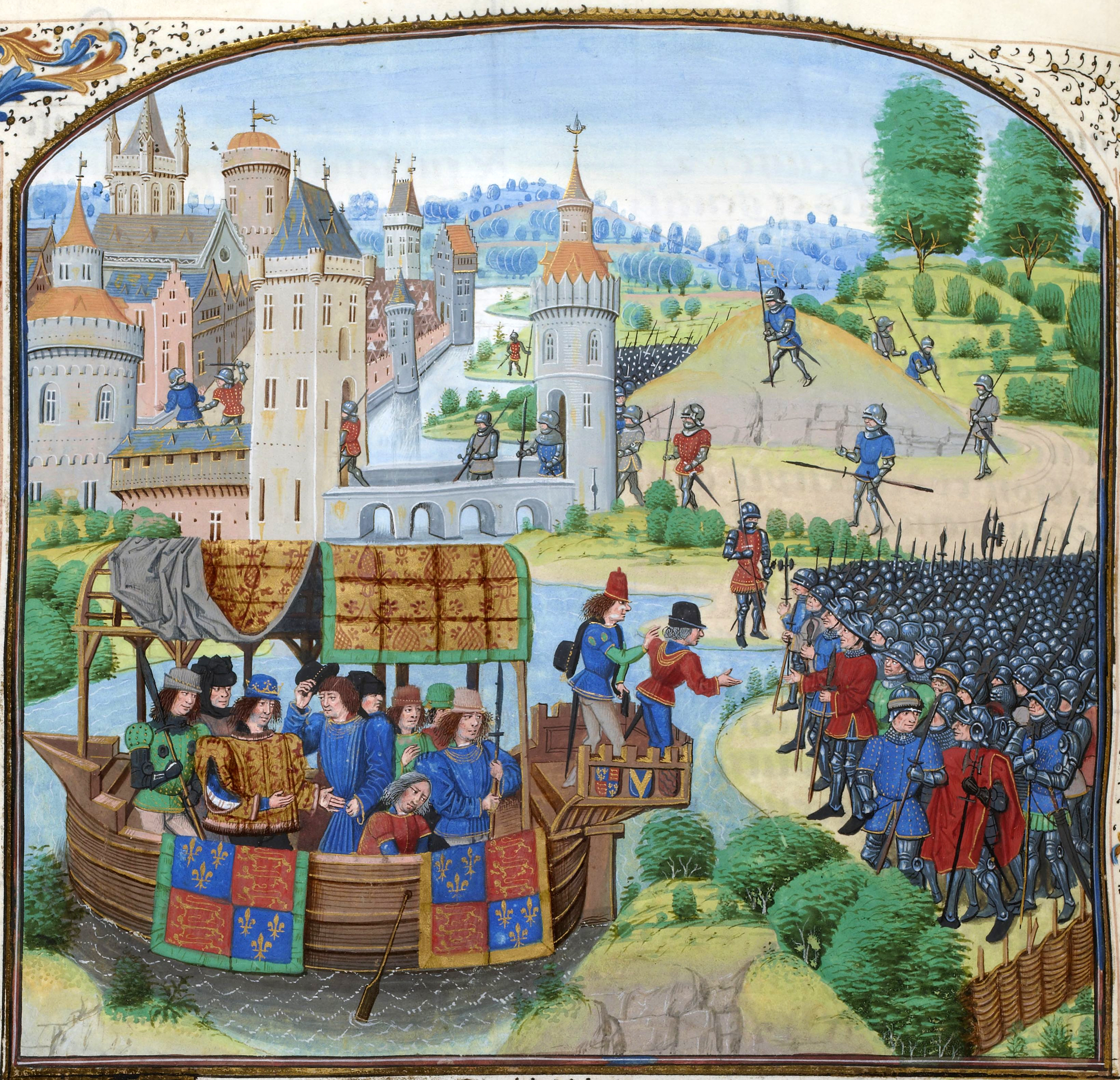
Richard II meets the rebels calling for economic and political reform during the Peasants Revolt of 1381.

Even before the end of the first outbreak of the Black Death, there were efforts by the authorities to stem the upward pressure on wages and prices, with parliament passing the emergency Ordinance of Labourers in 1349 and the Statute of Labourers in 1351. The efforts to regulate the economy continued as wages and prices rose, putting pressure on the landed classes, and in 1363 parliament attempted unsuccessfully to centrally regulate craft production, trading and retailing. A rising amount of the royal courts' time was involved in enforcing the failing labour legislation – as much as 70% by the 1370s. Many land owners attempted to vigorously enforce rents payable through agricultural service rather than money through their local manor courts, leading to attempts by many village communities to legally challenge local feudal practices using the Domesday Book as a legal basis for their claims. With the wages of the lower classes still rising, the government also attempted to regulate demand and consumption by reinstating the sumptuary laws in 1363. These laws banned the lower classes from consuming certain products or wearing high-status clothes, and reflected the significance of the consumption of high-quality breads, ales and fabrics as a way of signifying social class in the late medieval period.

The 1370s also saw the government facing difficulties in funding the long-running war with France. The impact of the Hundred Years War on the English economy as a whole remains uncertain; one suggestion is that the high taxation required to pay for the conflict "shrunk and depleted" the English economy, whilst others have argued for a more modest or even neutral economic impact for the war. The English government clearly found it difficult to pay for its army and from 1377 turned to a new system of poll taxes, aiming to spread the costs of taxation across the entirety of English society.

==== Peasants' Revolt of 1381 ====
One result of the economic and political tensions was the Peasants' Revolt of 1381, in which widespread rural discontent was followed by an invasion of London involving thousands of rebels. The rebels had many demands, including the effective end of the feudal institution of serfdom and a cap on the levels of rural rents. The ensuing violence took the political classes by surprise and the revolt was not fully put down until the autumn; up to 7,000 rebels were executed in the aftermath. As a result of the revolt, parliament retreated from the poll tax and instead focused on a system of indirect taxes centring on foreign trade, drawing 80% of tax revenues from the exports of wool. Parliament continued to collect direct tax levies at historically high levels up until 1422, although they reduced them in later years. As a result, successive monarchs found that their tax revenues were uncertain, and Henry VI enjoyed less than half the annual tax revenue of the late 14th century. England's monarchs became increasingly dependent on borrowing and forced loans to meet the gap between taxes and expenditure and even then faced later rebellions over levels of taxation, including the Yorkshire rebellion of 1489 and the Cornish rebellion of 1497 during the reign of Henry VII.

=== Agriculture, fishing and mining ===
==== Collapse of the demesne and the creation of the farming system ====
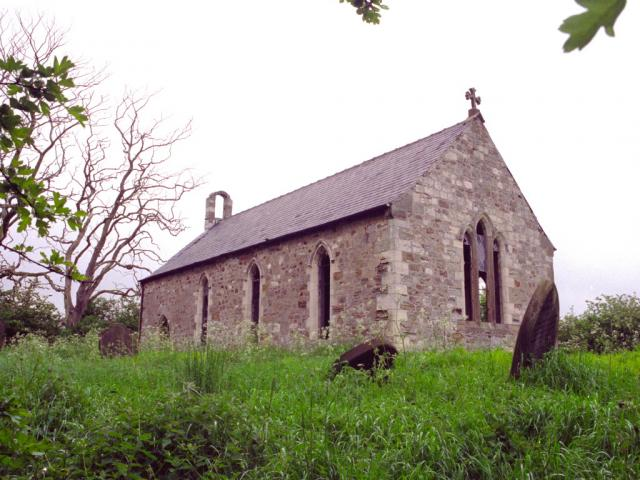
The ruined church in the deserted village of Embleton, County Durham, one of nearly 1,500 medieval villages abandoned after the agrarian crisis of the 14th century

The agricultural sector of the English economy, still by far the largest, was transformed by the Black Death. With the shortage of manpower after the Black Death, wages for agricultural labourers rapidly increased and continued to then grow steadily throughout the 15th century. As their incomes increased, labourers' living conditions and diet improved steadily. A trend for labourers to eat less barley and more wheat and rye, and to replace bread in their diet with more meat, had been apparent since before the Black Death, but intensified during this later period. Nonetheless, England's much smaller population needed less food and the demand for agricultural products fell. The position of the larger landowners became increasingly difficult. Revenues from demesne lands were diminishing as demand remained low and wage costs increased; nobles were also finding it more difficult to raise revenue from their local courts, fines and privileges in the years after the Peasants Revolt of 1381. Despite attempts to increase money rents, by the end of the 14th century the rents paid from peasant lands were also declining, with revenues falling as much as 55% between the 1380s and 1420s.

Noble and church landowners responded in various ways. They began to invest significantly less in agriculture and land was increasingly taken out of production altogether. In some cases entire settlements were abandoned, and nearly 1,500 villages were lost during this period. Landowners also abandoned the system of direct management of their demesne lands, which had begun back in the 1180s, and turned instead to "farming" out large blocks of land for fixed money rents. Initially, livestock and land were rented out together under "stock and lease" contracts, but this was found to be increasingly impractical and contracts for farms became centred purely on land. Many of the rights to church parish tithes were also "farmed" out in exchange for fixed rents. This process was encouraged by the trend for tithe revenues being increasing "appropriated" by central church authorities, rather than being used to support local clergy: around 39% of parish tithes had been centralised in this way by 1535. As the major estates transformed, a new economic grouping, the gentry, became evident, many of them benefiting from the opportunities of the farming system. Land distribution remained heavily unequal; estimates suggest that the English nobility owned 20% of English lands, the Church and Crown 33%, the gentry 25%, and the remainder was owned by peasant farmers. Agriculture itself continued to innovate, and the loss of many English oxen to the murrain sickness in the crisis increased the number of horses used to plough fields in the 14th century, a significant improvement on older methods.

==== Forests, fishing and mining ====
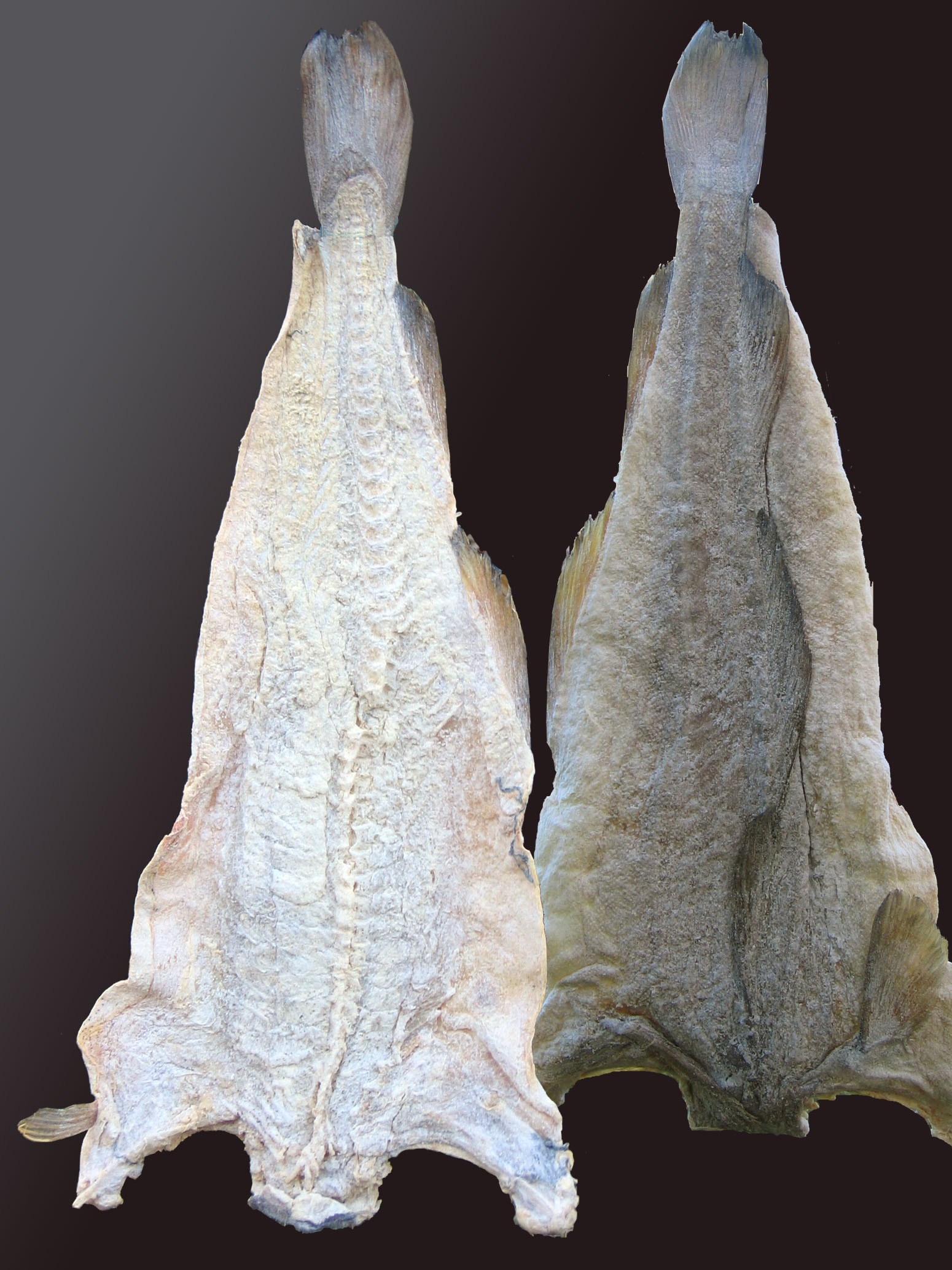
The more prestigious salted cod began to replace the herring as the catch of choice for English fishing fleets in the 15th century, requiring deep-sea fishing.

The royal forests continued to diminish in size and decline in economic importance in the years after the Black Death. Royal enforcement of forest rights and laws became harder after 1348 and certainly after 1381, and by the 15th century the royal forests were a "shadow of their former selves" in size and economic significance. In contrast, the English fishing industry continued to grow, and by the 15th century domestic merchants and financiers owned fleets of up to a hundred fishing vessels operating from key ports. Herring remained a key fishing catch, although as demand for herring declined with rising prosperity, the fleets began to focus instead on cod and other deep-sea fish from the Icelandic waters. Despite being critical to the fishing industry, salt production in England diminished in the 15th century due to competition from French producers. The use of expensive freshwater fish ponds on estates began to decline during this period, as more of the gentry and nobility opted to purchase freshwater fish from commercial river fisheries.

Mining generally performed well at the end of the medieval period, helped by buoyant demand for manufactured and luxury goods. Cornish tin production plunged during the Black Death itself, leading to a doubling of prices. Tin exports also collapsed catastrophically, but picked up again over the next few years. By the turn of the 16th century, the available alluvial tin deposits in Cornwall and Devon had begun to decline, leading to the commencement of bell and surface mining to support the tin boom that had occurred in the late 15th century. Lead mining increased, and output almost doubled between 1300 and 1500. Wood and charcoal became cheaper once again after the Black Death, and coal production declined as a result, remaining depressed for the rest of the period – nonetheless, some coal production was occurring in all the major English coalfields by the 16th century. Iron production continued to increase; the Weald in the South-East began to make increased use of water-power, and overtook the Forest of Dean in the 15th century as England's main iron-producing region. The first blast furnace in England, a major technical step forward in metal smelting, was created in 1496 in Newbridge in the Weald.

=== Trade, manufacturing and the towns ===
==== Shrinking towns ====
The percentage of England's population living in towns continued to grow but in absolute terms English towns shrunk significantly as a consequence of the Black Death, especially in the formerly prosperous east. The importance of England's Eastern ports declined over the period, as trade from London and the South-West increased in relative significance. Increasingly elaborate road networks were built across England, some involving the construction of up to thirty bridges to cross rivers and other obstacles. Nonetheless, it remained cheaper to move goods by water, and consequently timber was brought to London from as far away as the Baltic, and stone from Caen brought over the Channel to the South of England. Shipbuilding, particular in the South-West, became a major industry for the first time and investment in trading ships such as cogs was probably the single biggest form of late medieval investment in England.

==== Rise of the cloth trade ====
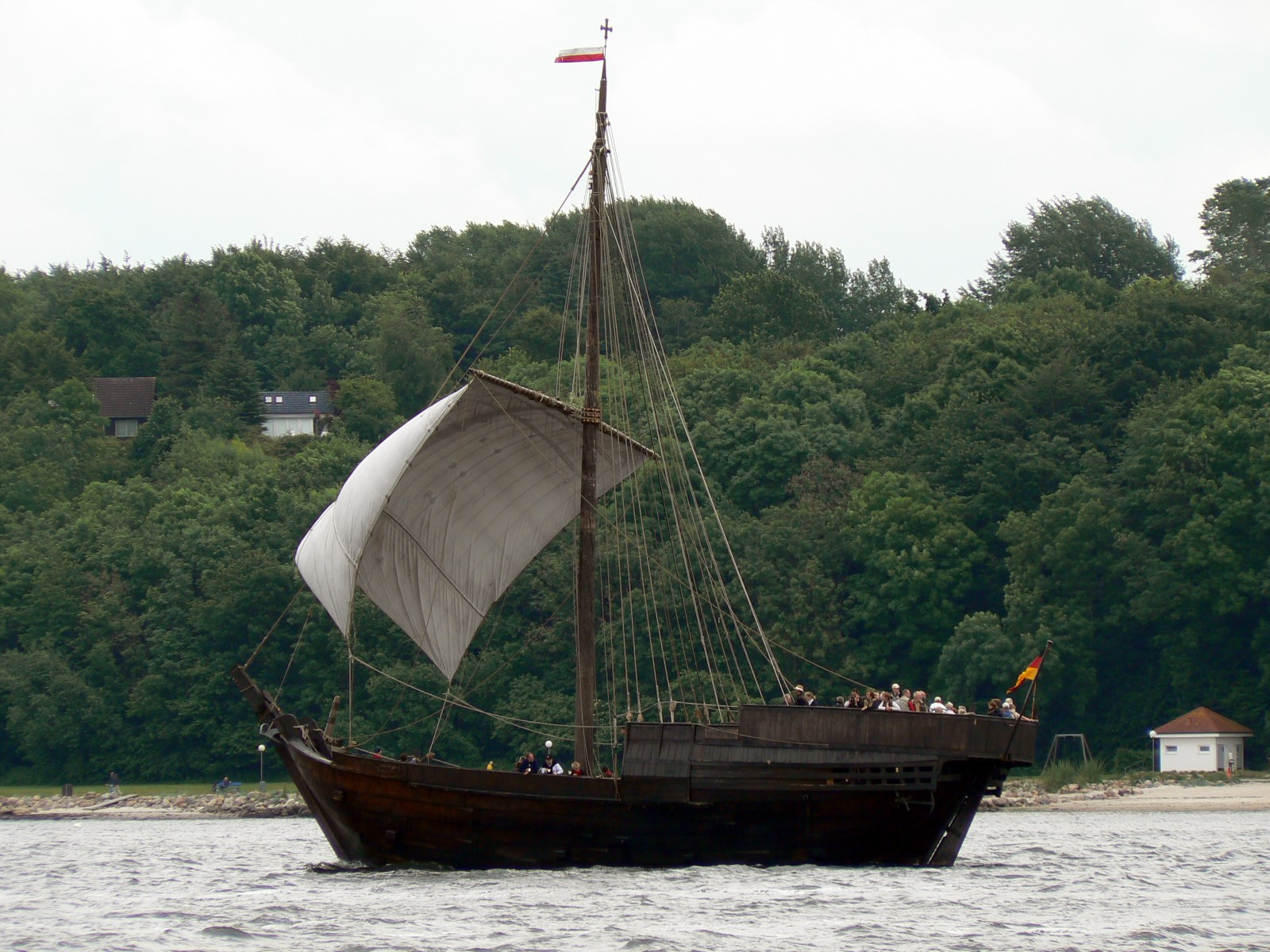
Cog ships were increasingly important to English trade as both exports and imports grew.

Cloth manufactured in England increasingly dominated European markets during the 15th and early 16th centuries. England exported almost no cloth at all in 1347, but by 1400 around 40,000 cloths (Note: A "cloth" in medieval times was a single piece of woven fabric from a loom of a fixed size; an English broadcloth, for example, was 24 yards long and 1.75 yards wide (22 m by 1.6 m).) a year were being exported – the trade reached its first peak in 1447 when exports reached 60,000. Trade fell slightly during the serious depression of the mid-15th century, but picked up again and reached 130,000 cloths a year by the 1540s. The centres of weaving in England shifted westwards towards the Stour Valley, the West Riding, the Cotswolds and Exeter, away from the former weaving centres in York, Coventry and Norwich.

The expansion of cloth exports was accompanied by changes in the organization of production. In some regions, clothiers coordinated spinning, weaving, fulling, and finishing through rural or domestic outworkers, an arrangement later known as the putting-out system. This system would continue to spread during the early modern period. The spinning wheel, which had reached Europe by the thirteenth century, was in use in England by the fourteenth century and gradually increased the productivity of yarn-making, although hand spindles continued to be used alongside it.

The wool and cloth trade was primarily now being run by English merchants themselves rather than by foreigners. Increasingly, the trade was also passing through London and the ports of the South-West. By the 1360s, 66–75% of the export trade was in English hands and by the 15th century this had risen to 80%; London managed around 50% of these exports in 1400, and as much as 83% of wool and cloth exports by 1540. The growth in the numbers of chartered trading companies in London, such as the Worshipful Company of Drapers or the Company of Merchant Adventurers of London, continued, and English producers began to provide credit to European buyers, rather than the other way around. Usury grew during the period, and few cases were prosecuted by the authorities.

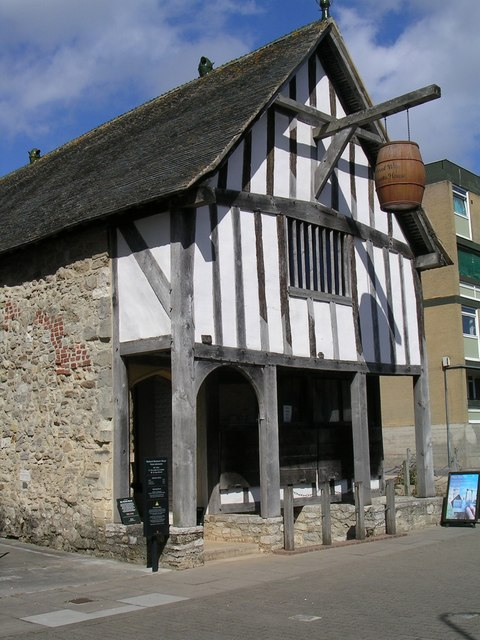
A medieval merchant's trading house in Southampton, restored to its mid-14th-century appearance

There were some reversals. The attempts of English merchants to break through the Hanseatic league directly into the Baltic markets failed in the domestic political chaos of the Wars of the Roses in the 1460s and 1470s. The wine trade with Gascony fell by half during the war with France, and the eventual loss of the province brought an end to the English domination of the business and temporary disruption to Bristol's prosperity until wines began to be imported through the city a few years later. Indeed, the disruption to both the Baltic and the Gascon trade contributed to a sharp reduction in the consumption of furs and wine by the English gentry and nobility during the 15th century.

There were advances in manufacturing, especially in the South and West. Despite some French attacks, the war created much coastal prosperity thanks to the huge expenditure on shipbuilding during the war, and the South-West also became a centre for English piracy against foreign vessels. Metalworking continued to grow, and in particular pewter working, which generated exports second only to cloth. By the 15th century pewter working in London was a large industry, with a hundred pewter workers recorded in London alone, and pewter working had also spread from the capital to eleven major cities across England. London goldsmithing remained significant but saw relatively little growth, with around 150 goldsmiths working in London during the period. Iron-working continued to expand and in 1509 the first cast-iron cannon was made in England. This was reflected in the rapid growth in the number of iron-working guilds, from three in 1300 to fourteen by 1422.

The result was a substantial influx of money that in turn encouraged the import of manufactured luxury goods; by 1391 shipments from abroad routinely included "ivory, mirrors, paxes, armour, paper..., painted clothes, spectacles, tin images, razors, calamine, treacle, sugar-candy, marking irons, patens..., ox-horns and quantities of wainscot". Imported spices now formed a part of almost all noble and gentry diets, with the quantities being consumed varying according to the wealth of the household. The English government was also importing large quantities of raw materials, including copper, for manufacturing weapons. Many major landowners tended to focus their efforts on maintaining a single major castle or house rather than the dozens a century before, but these were usually decorated much more luxurious than previously. Major merchants' dwellings, too, were more lavish than in previous years.

Printing was also introduced to England near the end of the medieval period, when William Caxton established a press at Westminster in 1476. Although initially a small urban trade, printing created a new branch of book production and retailing in late medieval London.

==== Decline of the fair system ====
Towards the end of the 14th century, the position of fairs began to decline. The larger merchants, particularly in London, began to establish direct links with the larger landowners such as the nobility and the church; rather than the landowner buying from a chartered fair, they would buy directly from the merchant. Meanwhile, the growth of the indigenous England merchant class in the major cities, especially London, gradually crowded out the foreign merchants upon whom the great chartered fairs had largely depended. The crown's control over trade in the towns, especially the emerging newer towns towards the end of the 15th century that lacked central civic government, was increasingly weaker, making chartered status less relevant as more trade occurred from private properties and took place all year around. Nonetheless, the great fairs remained of importance well into the 15th century, as illustrated by their role in exchanging money, regional commerce and in providing choice for individual consumers.

== Historiography ==
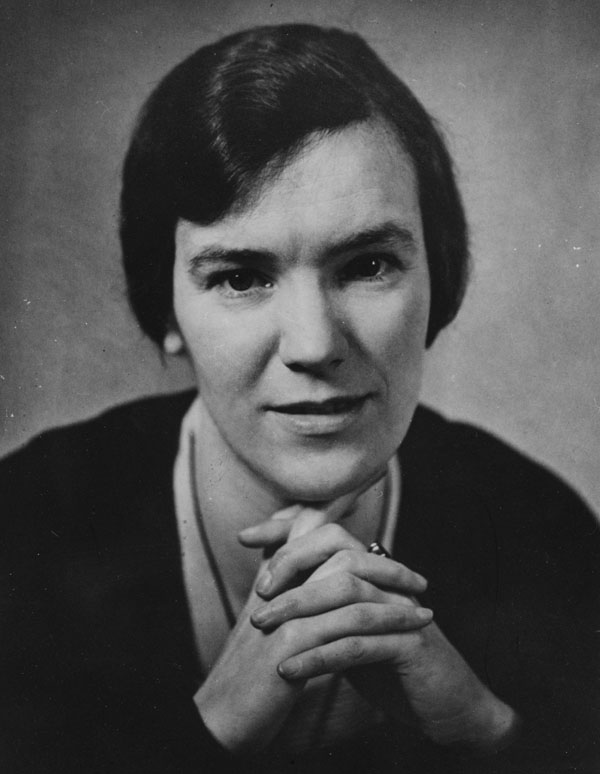
Eileen Power, one of the academics responsible for the reinvigoration of the study of the English medieval economy in the inter-war years

The first studies into the medieval economy of England began in the 1880s, principally around the work of English jurist and historian Frederic Maitland. This scholarship, drawing extensively on documents such as the Domesday Book and Magna Carta, became known as the "Whiggish" view of economic history, focusing on law and government. Late Victorian writers argued that change in the English medieval economy stemmed primarily from the towns and cities, leading to a progressive and universalist interpretation of development over the period, focusing on trade and commerce. Influenced by the evolution of Norman laws, Maitland argued that there was a clear discontinuity between the Anglo-Saxon and Norman economic systems.

In the 1930s the Whiggish view of the English economy was challenged by a group of scholars at the University of Cambridge, led by Eileen Power. Power and her colleagues widened the focus of study from legal and government documents to include "agrarian, archaeological, demographic, settlement, landscape and urban" evidence. This was combined with a neo-positivist and econometric leaning that was at odds with the older Victorian tradition in the subject. Power died in 1940, but Michael Postan, who had previously been her student but later became her husband, brought their work forward, and it came to dominate the post-war field.

Postan argued that demography was the principal driving force in the medieval English economy. In a distinctly Malthusian fashion, Postan proposed that the English agrarian economy saw little technical development during the period and by the early 14th century was unable to support the growing population, leading to inevitable famines and economic depression as the population came back into balance with land resources. Postan began the trend towards stressing continuities between the pre- and post-invasion economies, aided by fresh evidence emerging from the use of archaeological techniques to understand the medieval economy from the 1950s onwards.

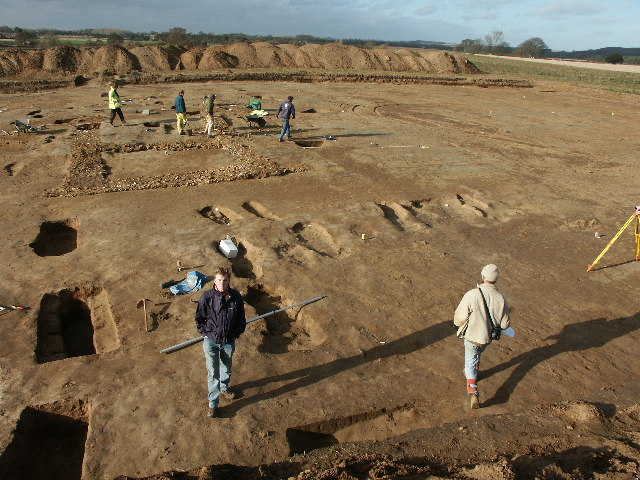
Rescue archaeology, such as this investigation into a medieval site, has increasingly contributed to understanding the English economy.

A Marxist critique of Postan emerged from the 1950s onwards, captured in the academic journal Past & Present. This school of thought agreed that the agrarian economy was central to medieval England, but argued that agrarian issues had less to do with demography than with the mode of production and feudal class relations. In this model the English economy entered the crisis of the early 14th century because of the struggles between landlords and peasant for resources and excessive extraction of rents by the nobility. Similar issues underpinned the Peasants Revolt of 1381 and later tax rebellions. Historians such as Frank Stenton developed the "honour" as a unit of economic analysis and a focus for understanding feudal relations in peasant communities; Rodney Hilton developed the idea of the rise of the gentry as a key feature for understanding the late medieval period.

Fresh work in the 1970s and 1980s challenged both Postan's and Marxist approaches to the medieval economy. Local studies of medieval economics, often in considerable detail and fusing new archaeological techniques and rescue archaeology with historical sources, often ran counter to their broader interpretations of change and development. The degree to which feudalism really existed and operated in England after the initial years of the invasion was thrown into considerable doubt, with historians such as David Crouch arguing that it existed primarily as a legal and fiscal model, rather than an actual economic system. Sociological and anthropological studies of contemporary economies, including the work of Ester Boserup showed many flaws with Postan's key assumptions about demography and land use. The current academic preference is to see the English medieval economy as an "overlapping network of diverse communities", in which active local choices and decisions are the result of independent agency, rather than a result of historically deterministic processes.

== See also ==
- Medieval demography
- History of the English penny (c. 600 – 1066)
- History of the English penny (1154–1485)
- John and William Merfold

== Bibliography ==
- Aberth, John. (2001) From the Brink of the Apocalypse: Confronting Famine, War, Plague and Death in the Later Middle Ages. London: Routledge. ISBN 0-415-92715-3.
- Abulafia, David. (ed) (1999) The New Cambridge Medieval History: c. 1198-c. 1300. Cambridge: Cambridge University Press. ISBN 978-0-521-36289-4.
- Anderson, Michael. (ed) (1996) British Population History: From the Black Death to the Present Day. Cambridge: Cambridge University Press. ISBN 978-0-521-57884-4.
- Archer, Rowena E. and Simon Walker. (eds) (1995) Rulers and Ruled in Late Medieval England. London: Hambledon Press. ISBN 978-1-85285-133-0.
- Armstrong, Lawrin, Ivana Elbl and Martin M. Elbl. (eds) (2007) Money, Markets and Trade in Late Medieval Europe: Essays in Honour of John H. A. Munro. Leiden: BRILL. ISBN 978-90-04-15633-3.
- Astill, Grenville. (2000) "General Survey 600–1300," in Palliser (ed) 2000.
- Astill, Grenville and John Langdon (eds) (2007) Medieval Farming and Technology: the Impact of Agricultural Change in Northwest Europe. Leiden: BRILL. ISBN 978-90-04-10582-9.
- Bailey, Mark. (1996) "Population and Economic Resources," in Given-Wilson (ed) 1996.
- Barron, Caroline. (2005) London in the Later Middle Ages: Government and People 1200–1500. Oxford: Oxford University Press. ISBN 978-0-19-928441-2.
- Barnes, Carl F. (2005) "A Note on Villard de Honnecourt and Metal," in Bork (ed) 2005.
- Bartlett, Robert. (2000) England under the Norman and Angevin Kings, 1075–1225. Oxford: Oxford University Press. ISBN 978-0-19-925101-8.
- Bayley, J. (2009) "Medieval Precious Metal Refining: Archaeology and Contemporary Texts Compared," in Martinon-Torres and Rehren (eds) 2009.
- Birrell, Jean. (1988) "Forest Law and the Peasantry in the Later Thirteenth Century," in Coss and Lloyd (eds) 1988.
- Blair, John and Nigel Ramsay. (eds) (2001) English Medieval Industries: Craftsmen, Techniques, Products. London: Hambledon Press. ISBN 978-1-85285-326-6.
- Blanchard, Ian. (2002) "Lothian and Beyond: the Economy of the "English Empire" of David I," in Britnell and Hatcher (eds) 2002.
- Bolton, J. K. (2007) "English Economy in the Early Thirteenth Century," in Church (ed) 2007.
- Bork, Robert Odell. (ed) (2005) De Re Metallica: The Uses of Metal in the Middle Ages. Aldershot, UK: Ashgate. ISBN 978-0-7546-5048-5.
- Britnell, Richard and John Hatcher (eds). (2002) Progress and Problems in Medieval England: Essays in Honour of Edward Miller. Cambridge: Cambridge University Press. ISBN 978-0-521-52273-1.
- Britnell, Richard and Ben Dodds (eds) (2008) Agriculture and Rural Society after the Black Death: common themes and regional variations. Hatfield, UK: University of Hatfield Press. ISBN 978-1-902806-79-2.
- Brown, R. Allen. (ed) (1989) Anglo-Norman Studies XI: Proceedings of the Battle Conference 1988. Woodbridge, UK: Boydell. ISBN 978-0-85115-526-5.
- Brown, Alfred L. (1989) The Governance of Late Medieval England, 1272–1461. Stanford: Stanford University Press. ISBN 978-0-8047-1730-4.
- Burton, Janet E. (1994) Monastic and Religious Orders in Britain, 1000–1300. Cambridge: Cambridge University Press. ISBN 978-0-521-37797-3.
- Cantor, Leonard (ed). (1982) The English Medieval Landscape. London: Croom Helm. ISBN 978-0-7099-0707-7.
- Cantor, Leonard. (1982a) "Introduction: the English Medieval Landscape," in Cantor (ed) 1982.
- Cantor, Leonard. (1982b) "Forests, Chases, Parks and Warrens," in Cantor (ed) 1982.
- Carpenter, David. (2004) The Struggle for Mastery: The Penguin History of Britain 1066–1284. London: Penguin Books. ISBN 978-0-14-014824-4.
- Church, S. D. (ed) (2007) King John: New Interpretations. Woodbridge, UK: Boydell Press. ISBN 978-0-85115-947-8.
- Cooper, Alan. (2006) Bridges, Law and Power in Medieval England, 700–1400. Woodbridge, UK: Boydell Press. ISBN 978-1-84383-275-1.
- Coss, Peter. (2002) "From Feudalism to Bastard Feudalism," in Fryde, Monnet and Oexle (eds) (2002)
- Coss, Peter and S.D. Lloyd (eds). (1988) Thirteenth Century England II: Proceedings of the Newcastle upon Tyne Conference 1987. Woodbridge, UK: Boydell Press. ISBN 978-0-85115-513-5.
- Crouch, David. (2005) The Birth of Nobility: Constructing Aristocracy in England and France : 900–1300. Harlow, UK: Pearson. ISBN 978-0-582-36981-8.
- Danziger, Danny and John Gillingham. (2003) 1215: The Year of Magna Carta. London: Coronet Books. ISBN 978-0-7432-5778-7.
- Dobbin, Frank. (ed) (2004) The Sociology of the Economy. New York: Russell Sage Foundation. ISBN 978-0-87154-284-7.
- Douglas, David Charles. (1962) William the Conqueror: the Norman Impact upon England. Berkeley: University of California Press.
- Dyer, Christopher. (2000) Everyday life in medieval England. London: Hambledon. ISBN 978-1-85285-201-6.
- Dyer, Christopher. (2009) Making a Living in the Middle Ages: The People of Britain, 850 – 1520. London: Yale University Press. ISBN 978-0-300-10191-1.
- Fletcher, Anthony and Diarmaid MacCulloch. (2008) Tudor Rebellions. Harlow, UK: Pearson Education. ISBN 978-1-4058-7432-8.
- Forey, Alan. (1992) The Military Orders from the Twelfth to the Early Fourteenth Centuries. London: Macmillan. ISBN 0-333-46235-1.
- Fryde, E. B. and Natalie Fryde. (1991) "Peasant Rebellion and Peasant Discontents," in Miller (ed) 1991.
- Fryde, Natalie, Pierre Monnet and Oto Oexle. (eds) (2002) Die Gegenwart des Feudalismus. Göttingen, Germany: Vandenhoeck and Ruprecht. ISBN 978-3-525-35391-2.
- Geddes, Jane. (2001) "Iron," in Blair and Ramsay (eds) 2001.
- Gerrard, Christopher. (2003) Medieval Archaeology: Understanding Traditions and Contemporary Approaches. Abingdon, UK: Routledge. ISBN 978-0-415-23463-4.
- Given-Wilson, Chris (ed). (1996) An Illustrated History of Late Medieval England. Manchester: Manchester University Press. ISBN 978-0-7190-4152-5.
- Hamilton, J. S. (ed) (2006) Fourteenth Century England, Volume 4. Woodbridge, UK: Boydell Press. ISBN 978-1-84383-220-1.
- Harriss, G. L. (1975) King, Parliament and Public Finance in Medieval England to 1369. Oxford: Clarendon Press. ISBN 0-19-822435-4
- Hatcher, John. (1996) "Plague, Population and the English Economy," in Anderson (ed) 1996.
- Hatcher, John. (2002) "The great slump of the mid-fifteenth century," in Britnell and Hatcher (eds) 2002.
- Harding, Alan. (1997) England in the Thirteenth Century. Cambridge: Cambridge University Press. ISBN 978-0-521-31612-5.
- Hicks, Michael (ed.) (2001) The Fifteenth Century 2: Revolution and Consumption in Late Medieval England. Woodbridge, UK: Boydell. ISBN 978-0-85115-832-7.
- Hillaby, Joe. (2003) "Jewish Colonisation in the Twelfth Century," in Skinner (ed) 2003.
- Hinton, David. (2002) Archaeology, Economy and Society: England from the Fifth to the Fifteenth Century. Abingdon, UK: Routledge. ISBN 978-0-203-03984-7.
- Hodgett, Gerald. (2006) A Social and Economic History of Medieval Europe. Abingdon, UK: Routledge. ISBN 978-0-415-37707-2.
- Homer, Ronald F. (2010) "Tin, Lead and Pewter," in Blair and Ramsay (eds) 2001.
- Huscroft, Richard. (2005) Ruling England, 1042–1217. Harlow, UK: Pearson. ISBN 978-0-582-84882-5.
- Jones, Dan. (2010) Summer of Blood: The Peasants' Revolt of 1381. London: Harper. ISBN 978-0-00-721393-1.
- Jordan, William Chester. (1997) The Great Famine: Northern Europe in the Early Fourteenth Century. Princeton: Princeton University Press. ISBN 978-0-691-05891-7.
- Keen, Laurence. (1989) "Coastal Salt Production in Norman England," in Brown R. (ed) 1989.
- Kermode, Jenny. (1998) Medieval Merchants: York, Beverley and Hull in the Later Middle Ages. Cambridge: Cambridge University Press. ISBN 978-0-521-52274-8.
- Kowalski, Maryanne. (2007) "Warfare, Shipping, and Crown Patronage: The Economic Impact of the Hundred Years War on the English Port Towns," in Armstrong, Elbl and Elbl (eds) 2007.
- Langdon, John, Grenville Astill and Janken Myrdal. (1997) "Introduction," in Astill and Langdon (eds) 1997.
- Lawler, John and Gail Gates Lawler. (2000) A Short Historical Introduction to the Law of Real Property. Washington DC: Beard Books. ISBN 978-1-58798-032-9.
- Lee, John. (2001) "The Trade of Fifteenth Century Cambridge and its Region," in Hicks (ed) 2001.
- Martinon-Torres, Marcos and Thilo Rehren (eds). (2009) Archaeology, History and Science: Integrating Approaches to Ancient Materials. Walnut Creek, California: Left Coast Press. ISBN 978-1-59874-350-0.
- McFarlane, Kenneth Bruce. (1981) England in the Fifteenth Century: Collected Essays. London: Hambledon Press. ISBN 978-0-907628-01-9.
- Miller, Edward. (ed) (1991) The Agrarian History of England and Wales, Volume III: 1348–1500. Cambridge: Cambridge University Press. ISBN 978-0-521-20074-5.
- Myers, A. R. (1971) England in the Late Middle Ages. Harmondsworth, UK: Penguin. ISBN 0-14-020234-X.
- Nightingale, Pamela. (2002) "The growth of London in the medieval English economy," in Britnell and Hatcher (eds) 2002.
- Palliser, D. M. (ed) (2000) The Cambridge Urban History of Britain: 600 – 1540, Volume 1. Cambridge: Cambridge University Press. ISBN 978-0-521-44461-3.
- Pilkinton, Mark Cartwright. (1997) Bristol. Toronto: University of Toronto Press. ISBN 978-0-8020-4221-7.
- Postan, M. M. (1942) "Some Social Consequences of the Hundred Years War," in Economic History Review, XII. JSTOR 2590387.
- Postan, M. M. (1972) The Medieval Economy and Society. Harmondsworth, UK: Penguin. ISBN 0-14-020896-8.
- Pounds, Norman John Greville. (2005) The Medieval City. Westport, CT: Greenwood Press. ISBN 978-0-313-32498-7.
- Raban, Sandra. (2000) England Under Edward I and Edward II, 1259–1327. Oxford: Blackwell. ISBN 978-0-631-22320-7.
- Rahman, M. M. (2005) Encyclopaedia of Historiography. New Delhi: Anmol. ISBN 978-81-261-2305-6.
- Ramsay, Nigel. (2001) "Introduction," in Blair and Ramsay (eds) 2001.
- Reyerson, Kathryn L. (1999) "Commerce and communications," in Abulafia (ed) 1999.
- Richardson, Amanda. "Royal Landscapes," in Hamilton (ed) 2006.
- Skinner, Patricia (ed). (2003) The Jews in Medieval Britain: Historical, Literary, and Archaeological Perspectives. Woodbridge, UK: Boydell. ISBN 978-0-85115-931-7.
- Stacey, Robert C. (2003) "The English Jews under Henry III," in Skinner (ed) 2003.
- Stenton, Doris Mary. (1976) English Society in the Early Middle Ages (1066–1307). Harmondsworth, UK: Penguin. ISBN 0-14-020252-8.
- Sutton, Anne. F. (2005) The Mercery of London: Trade, Goods and People, 1130–1578. Aldershot, UK: Ashgate. ISBN 978-0-7546-5331-8.
- Swanson, Robert N. "A universal levy: tithes and economy agency," in Dodd and Britnell (eds) 2008.
- Swedberg, Richard. (2004) "On Legal Institutions and Their Role in the Economy," in Dobbin (ed) 2004.
- Tait, James. (1999) The Medieval English Borough: Studies on its Origins and Constitutional History. Manchester: Manchester University Press. ISBN 978-0-7190-0339-4.
- Wood, Diana. (2002) Medieval Economic Thought. Cambridge: Cambridge University Press. ISBN 978-0-521-45893-1.
- Woolgar, Christopher. (1995) "Diet and Consumption in Gentry and Noble Households: A Case Study from around the Wash," in Archer and Walker (eds) 1995.
