= Embleton, County Durham =

Hamlet in County Durham, England

Coordinates: 54°39.7′N 1°20.7′W

Embleton
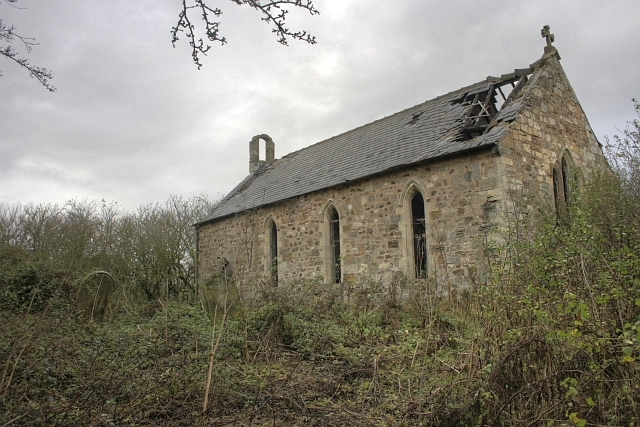
- The ruined church in Embleton

- Location within County Durham
- Civil parish: Sedgefield
- Unitary authority: County Durham
- Ceremonial county: Durham
- Region: North East
- Country: England
- Sovereign state: United Kingdom

Embleton is a hamlet and former civil parish, now in the parish of Sedgefield, in the County Durham district, in the ceremonial county of Durham, in England, as well as the site of a medieval village and manor. It is situated 3 miles (5 km) east of Sedgefield and 4 miles (6 km) west of Hartlepool. In 1961 the parish had a population of 80. The township was historically named "Elmdene", supposedly derived from the site's proximity to a woodland of elm trees which, at an earlier time, flourished in the bordering dene. A single farmstead now occupies the site which lies adjacent to the ruins of a small church (originally a manorial chapel of ease) dedicated to the Virgin Mary.

From the 13th to the mid 16th century the manor was the seat of the Elmeden family who assumed the local name. The village was one of nearly 1,500 medieval villages to be abandoned in the 14th century after the collapse of the demesne system of land management. It afterwards passed in the female line to the Bulmers and Smythes and in the 18th century to the Tempests of Wynyard, ancestors of the Marquesses of Londonderry.

== Civil parish ==
Embleton was formerly a township in the parish of Sedgefield, from 1866 Embleton was a civil parish in its own right, on 1 April 1983 the parish was abolished and merged with Sedgefield.
