= Walter of Henley =

13th-century English agricultural writer

Walter of Henley (Walter de Henley) was an English agricultural writer of the thirteenth century, writing in French. His known work is called Le Dite de Hosebondrie (or Husbandry), written about 1280, and deals with the agricultural management of a manor.

Little of Walter of Henley is known except that he once served in the office of bailiff. A manuscript of Husbandry housed at the University of Cambridge states that Walter was first a knight and then a friar-preacher, specifically a Dominican.

Walter's Husbandry was one of four agrarian treatises that appeared in the thirteenth century, treatises said by medieval historian Eileen Power to be "undoubtedly the most original contribution of the Middle Ages to scientific agriculture. Their value lies," she noted, "in their strictly empirical character, for they appear to spring straight from the soil, owing nothing to their great classical forerunners." Power attributes the appearance of these treatises in the thirteenth century to the fact that an intellectual revival was fostered by the friars of the time, notably the Franciscans, while, at the same time, the studies of the English schoolmen were beginning to lean toward what we might call "physical and biological inquiry." Desmene (or manorial) farming was at its height, creating a market for agrarian treatises among the great landowners, and indeed it is known that copies of the manuscripts were owned by religious houses which owned extensive lands.

Walter of Henley employed a "rustic" style of writing, making use of proverbs in French and English to make his points memorable. His work makes for pleasurable reading, so much so that Professor Bertha Haven Putnam noted, as a teacher, that "American undergraduate students read no mediæval work with greater pleasure than Walter of Henley's treatise."

A manuscript of Walter of Henley's work dating from the fifteenth century stated that it was translated into English by Robert Grosseteste, Bishop of Lincoln. This attribution has often been considered a mistake, probably arising from the fact that Robert wrote his own agrarian treatise called Rules, but Power argues that it is not far-fetched to associate Walter of Henley's treatise with the bishop of Lincoln since the latter was obviously interested in the subject.

Dr. William Cunningham has listed twenty surviving manuscripts of Walter of Henley's Husbandry, which was widely used until the sixteenth century when Sir Anthony Fitzherbert published The Boke of Husbandry, which, notably, contained several unattributed segments of Walter's work.

== Bibliography ==
- Elizabeth Lamond (1890), Walter of Henley's Husbandry: together with an anonymous Husbandry, Seneschaucie, and Robert Grosseteste's Rules
- Dorothea Oschinsky (1971), Walter of Henley and other Treatises on Estate Management and Accounting
