= November 15 =

November 15 this year in various calendars
- Sunday, 15 November 2026
Akan	Nkyikwasi
Armenian	28 Trē 1476
Aztec	Tlacaxipehualiztli 4, 11 Ōlīn
Babylonian	4 Arakhsamna, 2337 SE
Balinese pawukon	Menga, Kajeng, Jaya, Umanis, Urukung, Redite of Ukir, Kala, Gigis, Pandita
Bengali	30 Kartik, BS 1433
Chinese	Yin Water Snake・Room Mansion; Fire Horse Year, Month 10, Day 7 (Lidong, 7 days until Xiaoxue)
Common Era	15 November 2026 CE
Coptic	6 Hathor, AM 1743
Egyptian	3 Pharmuthi, 2775 NE
Ethiopian	6 H̱edār, 2019 Amätä Məhrät
French Republican	Décade III, Quartidi de Brumaire de l'Année 235 de la République
Gregorian	15 November, AD 2026
Hebrew	5 Kislev, AM 5787
Hindu	Uttarāṣāḍha・Śūla; Solar: 29 Kārtika, 1948 SE; Lunisolar: Ṣaṣṭhī, Śukla pakṣa of Kārtika, 2083 VE; Rāudra・5127 KY・1,872,894
Icelandic	Sunnudagur, 23 Gormánuður 2026
Islamic	4 Jumada al-thani, AH 1448 (using tabular method)
ISO week date	2026-W46-7
Japanese	7 Kannazuki, Reiwa 8 (Rittō, 7 days until Shōsetsu)
Julian	2 November, AD 2026 (AM 7535)
Julian day	2461360
Korean	7 Dwaejidal, 4359 DE
Maya	13.0.14.1.17; 10 Ceh, 11 Caban
Roman	ante diem IV Nonas Novembres, MMDCCLXXIX AUC
Solar Hijri	24 Aban, SH 1405
Tibetan	6 smin drug, me pho rta 2153 or 1772 or 1000

<<	November					>>
Su	Mo	Tu	We	Th	Fr	Sa
1	2	3	4	5	6	7
8	9	10	11	12	13	14
15	16	17	18	19	20	21
22	23	24	25	26	27	28
29	30
2026

November 15 in recent years
2026 (Sunday)
2025 (Saturday)
2024 (Friday)
2023 (Wednesday)
2022 (Tuesday)
2021 (Monday)
2020 (Sunday)
2019 (Friday)
2018 (Thursday)
2017 (Wednesday)

November 15 is the 319th day of the year (320th in leap years) in the Gregorian calendar; 46 days remain until the end of the year.

== Events ==
=== Pre-1600 ===
- 655 – Battle of the Winwaed: Penda of Mercia is defeated by Oswiu of Northumbria.
- 1315 – Growth of the Old Swiss Confederacy: The Schweizer Eidgenossenschaft ambushes the army of Leopold I in the Battle of Morgarten.
- 1532 – Spanish conquest of the Inca Empire: Commanded by Francisco Pizarro, Spanish conquistadors under Hernando de Soto meet Incan Emperor Atahualpa for the first time outside Cajamarca, arranging for a meeting in the city plaza the following day.
- 1533 – Francisco Pizarro arrives in Cuzco, the capital of the Inca Empire.

=== 1601–1900 ===
- 1688 – Prince William III of Orange lands a Dutch army at Brixham, beginning the 1688 invasion of England to challenge the rule of King James II and setting in motion the events that would lead to the Glorious Revolution.
- 1705 – Rákóczi's War of Independence: The Habsburg Empire and Denmark win a military victory over the Kurucs from Hungary in the Battle of Zsibó.
- 1760 – The secondly-built Castellania in Valletta is officially inaugurated with the blessing of the interior Chapel of Sorrows.
- 1777 – American Revolutionary War: After 16 months of debate the Continental Congress approves the Articles of Confederation.
- 1806 – Pike Expedition: Lieutenant Zebulon Pike spots a mountain peak while near the Colorado foothills of the Rocky Mountains. It is later named Pikes Peak in his honor.
- 1816 – The Spa Fields riots break out as a result of hunger and revolutionary feelings in the aftermath of the French Revolutionary and Napoleonic Wars.
- 1842 – A slave revolt in the Cherokee Nation commences.
- 1849 – Boilers of the steamboat Louisiana explode as she pulls back from the dock in New Orleans, killing more than 150 people.
- 1864 – American Civil War: Union General William Tecumseh Sherman begins his March to the Sea through Georgia towards the city of Savannah.
- 1884 – The Berlin Conference of 1884–1885 met on 15 November 1884, and after an adjournment concluded on 26 February 1885, with the signature of a General Act, regulating the European colonisation and trade in Africa during the New Imperialism period.
- 1889 – Brazil is declared a republic by Marshal Deodoro da Fonseca as Emperor Pedro II is deposed in a military coup.
- 1899 – Second Boer War: Battle of Chieveley, a British armored train is ambushed and partially derailed. British lose the battle, with 80 soldiers captured, along with war correspondent Winston Churchill.

=== 1901–present ===
- 1917 – Eduskunta declares itself the supreme state power of Finland, prompting its declaration of independence and secession from Russia.
- 1920 – The first assembly of the League of Nations is held in Geneva, Switzerland.
- 1920 – The Free City of Danzig is established.
- 1922 – At least 300 are massacred during a general strike in Guayaquil, Ecuador.
- 1928 – The RNLI lifeboat Mary Stanford capsizes in Rye Harbour with the loss of the entire 17-man crew.
- 1933 – Thailand holds its first election.
- 1938 – Nazi Germany bans Jewish children from public schools in the aftermath of Kristallnacht.
- 1942 – World War II: The Battle of Guadalcanal ends in a decisive Allied victory.
- 1943 – The Holocaust: German SS leader Heinrich Himmler orders that Gypsies are to be put "on the same level as Jews and placed in concentration camps".
- 1951 – Nikos Beloyannis, along with 11 comrades, is sentenced to death for attempting to reestablish the Communist Party of Greece.
- 1955 – The first part of the Saint Petersburg Metro is opened.
- 1957 – Short Solent 3 crashes near Chessell.
- 1959 – Four members of the Clutter family are murdered near Holcomb, Kansas, by Perry Smith and Richard Hickock, a crime later detailed by Truman Capote in his 1966 non-fiction novel In Cold Blood.
- 1965 – Craig Breedlove sets a land speed record of 600.601 mph (966.574 km/h) in his car, the Spirit of America, at the Bonneville Salt Flats in Utah.
- 1966 – Project Gemini: Gemini 12 completes the program's final mission, when it splashes down safely in the Atlantic Ocean.
- 1967 – The only fatality of the North American X-15 program occurs during the 191st flight when Air Force test pilot Michael J. Adams loses control of his aircraft which is destroyed mid-air over the Mojave Desert.
- 1968 – The Cleveland Transit System becomes the first transit system in the western hemisphere to provide direct rapid transit service from a city's downtown to its major airport.
- 1969 – Cold War: The Soviet submarine K-19 collides with the American submarine USS Gato in the Barents Sea.
- 1969 – Vietnam War: In Washington, D.C., 250,000–500,000 protesters staged a peaceful demonstration against the war, including a symbolic "March Against Death".
- 1971 – Intel releases the world's first commercial single-chip microprocessor, the 4004.
- 1976 – René Lévesque and the Parti Québécois take power to become the first Quebec government of the 20th century clearly in favor of independence.
- 1978 – A chartered Douglas DC-8 crashes near Colombo, Sri Lanka, killing 183.
- 1979 – A package from Unabomber Ted Kaczynski begins smoking in the cargo hold of a flight from Chicago to Washington, D.C., forcing the plane to make an emergency landing.
- 1983 – Turkish Republic of Northern Cyprus declares independence; it is only recognized by Turkey.
- 1985 – A research assistant is injured when a package from the Unabomber addressed to a University of Michigan professor explodes.
- 1985 – The Anglo-Irish Agreement is signed at Hillsborough Castle by British Prime Minister Margaret Thatcher and Irish Taoiseach Garret FitzGerald.
- 1986 – Israeli yeshiva student Eliahu Amedi is murdered in the Old City of Jerusalem by three members of the Popular Front for the Liberation of Palestine.
- 1987 – In Brașov, Romania, workers rebel against the communist regime of Nicolae Ceaușescu.
- 1987 – Continental Airlines Flight 1713 crashes during takeoff from Stapleton International Airport in Denver, Colorado, killing 25.
- 1988 – In the Soviet Union, the uncrewed Shuttle Buran makes its only space flight.
- 1988 – Israeli–Palestinian conflict: An independent State of Palestine is proclaimed by the Palestinian National Council.
- 1988 – The first Fairtrade label, Max Havelaar, is launched in the Netherlands.
- 1990 – The Communist People's Republic of Bulgaria is disestablished and a new republican government is instituted.
- 1990 – Space Shuttle Atlantis is launched on STS-38, a classified mission for the Department of Defense.
- 1992 – An Aero Caribbean Ilyushin Il-18 crashes on approach to Gregorio Luperón International Airport in Puerto Plata, killing 34.
- 1994 – A magnitude 7.1 earthquake hits the central Philippine island of Mindoro, killing 78 people, injuring 430 and triggering a tsunami up to 8.5 m (28 ft) high.
- 2000 – A chartered Antonov An-24 crashes after takeoff from Luanda, Angola, killing more than 40 people.
- 2000 – Jharkhand officially becomes the 28th state of India, formed from eighteen districts of southern Bihar.
- 2001 – Microsoft launches the Xbox game console in North America.
- 2002 – Hu Jintao becomes General Secretary of the Chinese Communist Party and a new nine-member Politburo Standing Committee is inaugurated.
- 2003 – The first day of the 2003 Istanbul bombings, in which two car bombs, targeting two synagogues, explode, kill 25 people and wound 300 more.
- 2006 – Al Jazeera English launches worldwide.
- 2007 – Cyclone Sidr hits Bangladesh, killing an estimated 5,000 people and destroying parts of the world's largest mangrove forest, the Sundarbans.
- 2010 – A fire in a high-rise apartment building in Shanghai, China kills 58 people.
- 2012 – Xi Jinping becomes General Secretary of the Chinese Communist Party and a new seven-member Politburo Standing Committee is inaugurated.
- 2016 – Hong Kong's High Court bans elected politicians Yau Wai-ching and Baggio Leung from the city's Parliament.
- 2017 – A flood a few miles outside of Athens results in the death of 25 people.
- 2017 – Khabarovsk Airlines Flight 463 crashes on approach to Nelkan Airport, killing six people.
- 2017 – Argentine submarine ARA San Juan disappears in the South Atlantic off the coast of Argentina while on a training exercise.
- 2020 – Lewis Hamilton wins the Turkish Grand Prix and secures his seventh drivers' title, equaling the all-time record held by Michael Schumacher.
- 2022 – The world population reached eight billion.
- 2025 – Anti-government demonstrations are held across Mexico following the assassination of Carlos Manzo earlier that month.

== Births ==
=== Pre-1600 ===
- 459 – Bʼutz Aj Sak Chiik, Mayan king (died 501)
- 1316 – John I, king of France and Navarre (died 1316)
- 1397 – Nicholas V, pope of the Catholic Church (died 1455)
- 1498 – Eleanor of Austria, queen of Portugal and France (died 1558)
- 1511 – Johannes Secundus, Dutch poet and author (died 1536)
- 1556 – Jacques Davy Duperron, French cardinal (died 1618)

=== 1601–1900 ===
- 1607 – Madeleine de Scudéry, French author (died 1701)
- 1660 – Hermann von der Hardt, German historian and orientalist (died 1746)
- 1661 – Christoph von Graffenried, Swiss-American settler and author (died 1743)
- 1692 – Eusebius Amort, German poet and theologian (died 1775)
- 1708 – William Pitt, 1st Earl of Chatham, English politician, Prime Minister of Great Britain (died 1778)
- 1738 – William Herschel, German-English astronomer and composer (died 1822)
- 1741 – Johann Kaspar Lavater, Swiss poet and physiognomist (died 1801)
- 1746 – Joseph Quesnel, French-Canadian poet, playwright, and composer (died 1809)
- 1757 – Heinrich Christian Friedrich Schumacher, Danish surgeon, botanist, and academic (died 1830)
- 1776 – José Joaquín Fernández de Lizardi, Mexican journalist and author (died 1827)
- 1784 – Jérôme Bonaparte, French husband of Catharina of Württemberg (died 1860)
- 1791 – Friedrich Ernst Scheller, German lawyer, jurist, and politician (died 1869)
- 1793 – Michel Chasles, French mathematician and academic (died 1880)
- 1849 – Mary E. Byrd, American astronomer and educator (died 1934)
- 1852 – Tewfik Pasha, Egyptian ruler (died 1892)
- 1859 – Christopher Hornsrud, Norwegian businessman and politician, 11th Prime Minister of Norway (died 1960)
- 1862 – Gerhart Hauptmann, German novelist, poet, and playwright, Nobel Prize laureate (died 1946)
- 1865 – John Earle, Australian politician, 22nd Premier of Tasmania (died 1932)
- 1866 – Cornelia Sorabji, Indian lawyer, social reformer and writer (died 1954)
- 1867 – Emil Krebs, German polyglot (died 1930)
- 1868 – Emil Racoviță, Romanian biologist, zoologist, and explorer (died 1947)
- 1873 – Sara Josephine Baker, American physician and academic (died 1945)
- 1874 – Dimitrios Golemis, Greek runner (died 1941)
- 1874 – August Krogh, Danish zoologist and physiologist, Nobel Prize laureate (died 1949)
- 1879 – Lewis Stone, American actor (died 1953)
- 1881 – Franklin Pierce Adams, American journalist and author (died 1960)
- 1882 – Felix Frankfurter, Austrian-American lawyer and jurist (died 1965)
- 1886 – René Guénon, French-Egyptian philosopher and author (died 1951)
- 1887 – Marianne Moore, American poet, critic, and translator (died 1972)
- 1887 – Georgia O'Keeffe, American painter and educator (died 1986)
- 1888 – Artie Matthews, American pianist and composer (died 1958)
- 1890 – Richmal Crompton, English author and educator (died 1969)
- 1891 – W. Averell Harriman, American businessman and politician, 11th United States Secretary of Commerce (died 1986)
- 1891 – Erwin Rommel, German field marshal (died 1944)
- 1892 – Naomi Childers, American actress (died 1964)
- 1895 – Grand Duchess Olga Nikolaevna of Russia (died 1918)
- 1895 – Antoni Słonimski, Polish journalist, poet, and playwright (died 1976)
- 1896 – Leonard Lord, English businessman (died 1967)
- 1897 – Aneurin Bevan, Welsh journalist and politician, Secretary of State for Health (died 1960)
- 1897 – Sacheverell Sitwell, English author and critic (died 1988)
- 1899 – Avdy Andresson, Estonian-American soldier and diplomat, Estonian Minister of War (died 1990)

=== 1901–present ===
- 1903 – Stewie Dempster, New Zealand cricketer and coach (died 1974)
- 1905 – Mantovani, Italian conductor and composer (died 1980)
- 1906 – Curtis LeMay, American general and politician (died 1990)
- 1907 – Claus von Stauffenberg, German colonel (died 1944)
- 1908 – Carlo Abarth, Italian engineer and businessman, founded Abarth (died 1979)
- 1912 – Harald Keres, Estonian physicist and academic (died 2010)
- 1912 – Yi Wu, Japanese-Korean colonel (died 1945)
- 1913 – Jack Dyer, Australian footballer and coach (died 2003)
- 1913 – Arthur Haulot, Belgian journalist and poet (died 2005)
- 1914 – V. R. Krishna Iyer, Indian lawyer and judge (died 2014)
- 1916 – Nita Barrow, Barbadian nurse and politician, 7th Governor-General of Barbados (died 1995)
- 1916 – Bill Melendez, Mexican-American voice actor, animator, director, and producer (died 2008)
- 1919 – Carol Bruce, American singer and actress (died 2007)
- 1919 – Joseph Wapner, American judge and television personality (died 2017)
- 1920 – Vasilis Diamantopoulos, Greek actor, director, and screenwriter (died 1999)
- 1922 – Francis Brunn, German juggler (died 2004)
- 1922 – David Sidney Feingold, American biochemist and academic (died 2019)
- 1922 – Francesco Rosi, Italian director and screenwriter (died 2015)
- 1923 – Văn Cao, Vietnamese composer, poet, and painter (died 1995)
- 1923 – Samuel Klein, Polish-Brazilian businessman and philanthropist, founded Casas Bahia (died 2014)
- 1924 – Gianni Ferrio, Italian composer and conductor (died 2013)
- 1925 – Howard Baker, American lawyer, politician, and diplomat, 12th White House Chief of Staff (died 2014)
- 1926 – Thomas Williams, American author and academic (died 1990)
- 1927 – Bill Rowling, New Zealand politician, 30th Prime Minister of New Zealand (died 1995)
- 1929 – Ed Asner, American actor, singer, and producer (died 2021)
- 1929 – Joe Hinton, American singer (died 1968)
- 1930 – J. G. Ballard, English novelist, short story writer, and essayist (died 2009)
- 1930 – Olene Walker, American lawyer and politician, 15th Governor of Utah (died 2015)
- 1931 – Mwai Kibaki, Kenyan economist and politician, 3rd President of Kenya (died 2022)
- 1931 – Pascal Lissouba, Congolese politician, President of the Republic of the Congo (died 2020)
- 1932 – Petula Clark, English singer-songwriter and actress
- 1932 – Clyde McPhatter, American singer (died 1972)
- 1932 – Alvin Plantinga, American philosopher, author, and academic
- 1933 – Gloria Foster, American actress (died 2001)
- 1933 – Theodore Roszak, American scholar and author (died 2011)
- 1934 – Joanna Barnes, American actress and author (died 2022)
- 1935 – Nera White, American basketball player (died 2016)
- 1935 – Mahmoud Abbas, Palestinian politician
- 1936 – Wolf Biermann, German singer-songwriter and guitarist
- 1936 – Tara Singh Hayer, Indian-Canadian journalist and publisher (died 1998)
- 1937 – Little Willie John, American singer-songwriter (died 1968)
- 1939 – Yaphet Kotto, American actor and screenwriter (died 2021)
- 1939 – Rauni-Leena Luukanen-Kilde, Finnish physician and parapsychologist (died 2015)
- 1939 – Enzo Staiola, Italian child actor (died 2025)
- 1940 – Roberto Cavalli, Italian fashion designer (died 2024)
- 1940 – Ulf Pilgaard, Danish actor and screenwriter
- 1940 – Sam Waterston, American actor
- 1942 – Daniel Barenboim, Argentinian-Israeli pianist and conductor
- 1945 – Roger Donaldson, Australian director, producer, and screenwriter
- 1945 – Bob Gunton, American actor and singer
- 1945 – Anni-Frid Lyngstad, Norwegian-Swedish singer
- 1946 – Vassilis Goumas, Greek basketball player
- 1947 – Bob Dandridge, American basketball player
- 1947 – Bill Richardson, American politician and diplomat, 21st United States Ambassador to the United Nations (died 2023)
- 1947 – Ken Sutcliffe, Australian journalist and sportscaster
- 1948 – Jimmy Choo, Malaysian fashion designer
- 1950 – Egon Vaupel, German lawyer and politician, 16th Mayor of Marburg
- 1951 – Beverly D'Angelo, American actress, singer, and producer
- 1952 – Randy Savage, American wrestler (died 2011)
- 1953 – Alexander O'Neal, American R&B singer-songwriter and arranger
- 1953 – James Widdoes, American actor, director, and producer
- 1954 – Kevin S. Bright, American director and producer
- 1954 – Aleksander Kwaśniewski, Polish journalist and politician, 3rd President of Poland
- 1954 – Randy Thomas, American singer-songwriter, guitarist, and producer
- 1954 – Tony Thompson, American R&B, disco, and rock drummer (died 2003)
- 1956 – Michael Hampton, American guitarist and producer
- 1957 – Gerry Connolly, Australian comedian and actor
- 1957 – Kevin Eubanks, American guitarist and composer
- 1957 – Harold Marcuse, American historian and educator
- 1957 – Michael Woythe, German footballer and manager
- 1958 – Lewis Fitz-Gerald, Australian actor and director
- 1958 – Gu Kailai, Chinese lawyer and businesswoman
- 1958 – Lesley Laird, British politician
- 1959 – Tibor Fischer, English author
- 1960 – Dawn Airey, English broadcaster
- 1961 – Hugh McGahan, New Zealand rugby league player
- 1962 – Judy Gold, American comedian, actress, and producer
- 1963 – Benny Elias, Lebanese-Australian rugby league player and sportscaster
- 1964 – Stelios Aposporis, Greek footballer and manager
- 1964 – Mikhail Rusyayev, Russian footballer, coach, and manager (died 2011)
- 1965 – Stefan Pfeiffer, German swimmer
- 1966 – Rachel True, American actress
- 1967 – Greg Anthony, American basketball player and sportscaster
- 1967 – Cynthia Breazeal, American computer scientist, roboticist, and academic
- 1967 – E-40, American rapper and actor
- 1967 – François Ozon, French director, producer, and screenwriter
- 1967 – Gus Poyet, Uruguayan footballer and manager
- 1967 – Jon Preston, New Zealand rugby player
- 1968 – Ol' Dirty Bastard, American rapper and producer (died 2004)
- 1968 – Fausto Brizzi, Italian director, producer, and screenwriter
- 1968 – Uwe Rösler, German footballer and manager
- 1970 – Jack Ingram, American singer-songwriter and guitarist
- 1970 – Alexander Kvitashvili, Georgian-Ukrainian academic and politician, 19th Ukrainian Minister of Healthcare
- 1970 – Patrick M'Boma, Cameroonian footballer
- 1971 – Jay Harrington, American actor
- 1971 – Martin Pieckenhagen, German footballer
- 1972 – Jonny Lee Miller, English-American actor
- 1973 – Sydney Tamiia Poitier, American actress
- 1973 – Alamgir Sheriyar, English cricketer
- 1974 – Chad Kroeger, Canadian singer-songwriter, guitarist, and producer
- 1975 – Boris Živković, Croatian footballer
- 1976 – Brandon DiCamillo, American comedian, actor, and stuntman
- 1976 – Virginie Ledoyen, French actress
- 1977 – Richard Lintner, Slovak ice hockey player
- 1977 – Steven Miles, Australian politician, 40th Premier of Queensland
- 1977 – Sean Murray, American actor
- 1977 – Peter Phillips, English businessman
- 1979 – Josemi, Spanish footballer
- 1979 – Brett Lancaster, Australian cyclist
- 1981 – Lorena Ochoa, Mexican golfer
- 1982 – Rio Hirai, Japanese actress
- 1982 – Benjamin Krause, German rugby player
- 1982 – Giaan Rooney, Australian swimmer
- 1982 – Kalu Uche, Nigerian footballer
- 1983 – Dominic Carroll, Gibraltarian runner
- 1983 – Sophia Di Martino, English actress
- 1983 – Aleksandar Pavlović, Serbian basketball player
- 1983 – Fernando Verdasco, Spanish tennis player
- 1983 – John Heitinga, Dutch footballer and coach
- 1984 – Asia Kate Dillon, American actor and producer
- 1985 – Lily Aldridge, American model
- 1985 – Charron Fisher, American basketball player
- 1985 – Simon Spender, Welsh footballer
- 1986 – Winston Duke, Tobagonian-American actor
- 1986 – Matthew Patrick, American internet personality and Youtuber
- 1986 – Coye Francies, American football player
- 1986 – Sania Mirza, Indian tennis player
- 1986 – Jerry Roush, American singer-songwriter
- 1987 – Sergio Llull, Spanish basketball player
- 1988 – B.o.B, American rapper, songwriter, and producer
- 1988 – Quanitra Hollingsworth, American-Turkish basketball player
- 1988 – Morgan Parra, French rugby player
- 1988 – Billy Twelvetrees, English rugby player
- 1989 – Jona Viray, Filipino singer
- 1991 – Maxime Colin, French footballer
- 1991 – Shailene Woodley, American actress
- 1992 – Dylan Bundy, American baseball player
- 1992 – Sofia Goggia, Italian skier
- 1992 – Minami Minegishi, Japanese singer
- 1992 – Kevin Wimmer, Austrian footballer
- 1993 – Arik Armstead, American football player
- 1993 – Paulo Dybala, Argentine footballer
- 1993 – Melitina Staniouta, Belarusian rhythmic gymnast
- 1994 – Ekaterina Alexandrova, Russian tennis player
- 1994 – Emma Dumont, American actress and model
- 1994 – Bryce Cartwright, Australian rugby league player
- 1994 – Alejandro Saab, American voice actor, YouTuber, and VTuber
- 1995 – Blake Pieroni, American swimmer
- 1995 – Karl-Anthony Towns, Dominican-American basketball player
- 1996 – Kim Min-jae, South Korean footballer
- 1997 – Paula Badosa, Spanish tennis player
- 1998 – Anton Stach, German footballer
- 2001 – TyTy Washington Jr., American basketball player
- 2005 – Roony Bardghji, Swedish footballer

== Deaths ==
=== Pre-1600 ===
- 165 BCE – Mattathias, Jewish resistance leader
- 621 – Malo, Breton bishop and saint
- 655 – Æthelhere, king of East Anglia
- 655 – Penda of Mercia, king of Mercia
- 1037 – Odo II, French nobleman (born 983)
- 1136 – Leopold III, margrave of Austria (born 1073)
- 1194 – Margaret I, countess of Flanders
- 1226 – Frederick of Isenberg, German nobleman (born 1193)
- 1280 – Albertus Magnus, German bishop, theologian, and philosopher (born 1193)
- 1347 – James I of Urgell, Spanish nobleman (born 1321)
- 1351 – Joanna of Pfirt, duchess of Austria
- 1379 – Otto V, duke of Bavaria
- 1463 – Giovanni Antonio Del Balzo Orsini, Italian nobleman
- 1527 – Catherine of York, English princess (born 1479)
- 1579 – Ferenc Dávid, Hungarian preacher, founder of the Unitarian Church of Transylvania (born 1510)

=== 1601–1900 ===
- 1628 – Roque González de Santa Cruz, Paraguayan missionary and martyr (born 1576)
- 1629 – Gabriel Bethlen, Prince of Transylvania (born 1580)
- 1630 – Johannes Kepler, German astronomer and mathematician (born 1571)
- 1670 – John Amos Comenius, Czech bishop, philosopher, and educator (born 1592)
- 1691 – Aelbert Cuyp, Dutch painter (born 1620)
- 1706 – Tsangyang, Tibetan dalai lama (born 1683)
- 1712 – James Hamilton, 4th Duke of Hamilton, Scottish general and politician, Lord Lieutenant of Lancashire (born 1658)
- 1712 – Charles Mohun, 4th Baron Mohun, English politician (born 1675)
- 1787 – Christoph Willibald Gluck, German composer (born 1714)
- 1794 – John Witherspoon, Scottish-American minister and academic (born 1723)
- 1795 – Charles-Amédée-Philippe van Loo, French painter (born 1719)
- 1832 – Jean-Baptiste Say, French economist and businessman (born 1767)
- 1836 – Herman of Alaska, Russian missionary and saint (born 1750s)
- 1845 – William Knibb, English Baptist minister and Jamaican missionary (born 1803)
- 1853 – Maria II, Portuguese queen and regent (born 1819)
- 1892 – Thomas Neill Cream, Scottish-Canadian serial killer (born 1850)
- 1897 – Alfred Kennerley, English-Australian politician, 10th Premier of Tasmania (born 1810)

=== 1901–present ===
- 1908 – Cixi, China empress dowager and regent (born 1835)
- 1910 – Wilhelm Raabe, German author (born 1831)
- 1916 – Henryk Sienkiewicz, Polish journalist and author, Nobel Prize laureate (born 1846)
- 1917 – Émile Durkheim, French sociologist, psychologist, and philosopher (born 1858)
- 1919 – Mikhail Dolivo-Dobrovolsky, Polish-Russian engineer, electrician, and inventor (born 1862)
- 1919 – Mohammad Farid, Egyptian lawyer and politician (born 1868)
- 1919 – Alfred Werner, French-Swiss chemist and academic, Nobel Prize laureate (born 1866)
- 1921 – Tadhg Barry, Irish republican and trade unionist, killed in prison (born 1880)
- 1922 – Dimitrios Gounaris, Greek lawyer and politician, 94th Prime Minister of Greece (born 1866)
- 1922 – Petros Protopapadakis, Greek mathematician and politician, 107th Prime Minister of Greece (born 1854)
- 1922 – Nikolaos Stratos, Greek lawyer and politician, 106th Prime Minister of Greece (born 1872)
- 1941 – Wal Handley, English motorcycle racer (born 1902)
- 1942 – Annemarie Schwarzenbach, Swiss author and photographer (born 1908)
- 1945 – Frank Chapman, American ornithologist and photographer (born 1864)
- 1949 – Narayan Apte, Indian activist, assassin of Mahatma Gandhi (born 1911)
- 1949 – Nathuram Godse, Indian assassin of Mahatma Gandhi (born 1910)
- 1951 – Frank Weston Benson, American painter and educator (born 1862)
- 1954 – Lionel Barrymore, American actor, singer, director, and screenwriter (born 1878)
- 1956 – Emma Richter, German paleontologist (born 1888)
- 1958 – Tyrone Power, American actor, singer, and producer (born 1914)
- 1959 – Charles Thomson Rees Wilson, Scottish physicist and meteorologist, Nobel Prize laureate (born 1869)
- 1960 – Robert Raymond Cook, Canadian murderer (born 1937)
- 1961 – Elsie Ferguson, American actress (born 1883)
- 1961 – Johanna Westerdijk, Dutch pathologist and academic (born 1883)
- 1963 – Fritz Reiner, Hungarian-American conductor (born 1888)
- 1966 – Dimitrios Tofalos, Greek weightlifter and wrestler (born 1877)
- 1966 – William Zorach, Lithuanian-American sculptor and painter (born 1887)
- 1967 – Michael J. Adams, American soldier, pilot, and astronaut (born 1930)
- 1970 – Konstantinos Tsaldaris, Egyptian-Greek politician (born 1884)
- 1971 – Rudolf Abel, English-Russian colonel (born 1903)
- 1976 – Jean Gabin, French actor, singer, and producer (born 1904)
- 1978 – Margaret Mead, American anthropologist and author (born 1901)
- 1980 – Bill Lee, American actor and singer (born 1916)
- 1981 – Steve Macko, American baseball player and coach (born 1954)
- 1981 – Enid Markey, American actress (born 1894)
- 1981 – Khawar Rizvi, Pakistani poet and scholar (born 1938)
- 1982 – Vinoba Bhave, Indian philosopher and Gandhian, Bharat Ratna Awardee (born 1895)
- 1982 – Martín de Álzaga, Argentinian race car driver (born 1901)
- 1983 – John Grimaldi, English keyboard player and songwriter (born 1955)
- 1983 – Charlie Grimm, American baseball player and manager (born 1898)
- 1983 – John Le Mesurier, English actor (born 1912)
- 1984 – Baby Fae, American infant, who received baboon heart (born 1984)
- 1985 – Méret Oppenheim, German-Swiss painter, photographer, and poet (born 1913)
- 1988 – Billo Frómeta, Dominican conductor and composer (born 1915)
- 1988 – Ieronymos I of Athens, Greek archbishop and theologian (born 1905)
- 1994 – Elizabeth George Speare, American author (born 1908)
- 1996 – Alger Hiss, American lawyer and diplomat (born 1904)
- 1997 – Saul Chaplin, American director and composer (born 1912)
- 1998 – Stokely Carmichael, Trinidadian-American activist (born 1941)
- 1998 – Ludvík Daněk, Czech discus thrower (born 1937)
- 2000 – Edoardo Agnelli, son of industrialist Gianni Agnelli (born 1954)
- 2001 – Frances Hawkins, American politician and teacher, member of the Nevada State Assembly (born 1921)
- 2003 – Ray Lewis, Canadian runner (born 1910)
- 2003 – Dorothy Loudon, American actress and singer (born 1925)
- 2003 – Laurence Tisch, American businessman, co-founded the Loews Corporation (born 1923)
- 2003 – Speedy West, American guitarist and producer (born 1924)
- 2004 – Elmer L. Andersen, American businessman and politician, 30th Governor of Minnesota (born 1909)
- 2004 – John Morgan, Welsh-Canadian actor and screenwriter (born 1930)
- 2005 – Adrian Rogers, American pastor and author (born 1931)
- 2005 – Arto Salminen, Finnish journalist and author (born 1959)
- 2006 – David K. Wyatt, American historian and author (born 1937)
- 2007 – Joe Nuxhall, American baseball player and sportscaster (born 1928)
- 2008 – Grace Hartigan, American painter (born 1922)
- 2009 – Serbian Patriarch Pavle II (born 1914)
- 2010 – Larry Evans, American chess player and journalist (born 1932)
- 2010 – Ed Kirkpatrick, American baseball player (born 1944)
- 2010 – William Edwin Self, American actor, director, and producer (born 1921)
- 2011 – Oba Chandler, American murderer (born 1946)
- 2012 – Théophile Abega, Cameroonian footballer and politician (born 1954)
- 2012 – Luís Carreira, Portuguese motorcycle racer (born 1976)
- 2012 – Maleli Kunavore, Fijian rugby player (born 1983)
- 2012 – K. C. Pant, Indian politician, 18th Indian Minister of Defence (born 1931)
- 2012 – Frode Thingnæs, Norwegian trombonist, composer, and conductor (born 1940)
- 2013 – Sheila Matthews Allen, American actress and producer (born 1929)
- 2013 – Glafcos Clerides, Cypriot lawyer and politician, 4th President of Cyprus (born 1919)
- 2013 – Mike McCormack, American football player and coach (born 1930)
- 2014 – Jack Bridger Chalker, English painter and academic (born 1918)
- 2014 – Lucien Clergue, French photographer and educator (born 1934)
- 2014 – Valéry Mézague, Cameroonian footballer (born 1983)
- 2014 – Reg Withers, Australian soldier and politician, Australian Minister for the Capital Territory (born 1924)
- 2015 – Gisèle Prassinos, French author (born 1920)
- 2015 – Herbert Scarf, American economist and academic (born 1930)
- 2015 – Saeed Jaffrey, Indian-British actor (born 1929)
- 2016 – Mose Allison, American pianist and songwriter (born 1927)
- 2017 – Lil Peep, American singer and rapper (born 1996)
- 2023 – Žarko Laušević, Serbian actor (born 1960)
- 2024 – Celeste Caeiro, Portuguese pacifist (born 1933)
- 2024 – Béla Károlyi, Romanian-American gymnastics coach (born 1942)
- 2024 – Jon Kenny, Irish comedian and actor (born 1957)
- 2024 – Yuriko, Princess Mikasa, Japanese princess (born 1923)

== Holidays and observances ==
- America Recycles Day (United States)
- Christian feast day:
  - Abibus of Edessa
  - Albert the Great
  - Blessed Caius of Korea
  - Didier of Cahors
  - Francis Asbury and George Whitefield (Episcopal Church)
  - Blessed Hugh Faringdon
  - Joseph Mukasa Balikuddembe
  - Leopold III, a public holiday in Lower Austria and Vienna.
  - Blessed Lucy Brocadelli
  - Malo
  - Mechell
  - Raphael Kalinowski
  - Roque González y de Santa Cruz
  - November 15 (Eastern Orthodox liturgics)
- Day of the German-speaking Community of Belgium (German-speaking Community of Belgium)
- Day of the Imprisoned Writer (International observance)
- Independence Day, unilaterally declared in 1988. (Palestine)
- King's Feast (Belgium)
- National Tree Planting Day (Sri Lanka)
- Peace Day (Ivory Coast)
- Republic Proclamation Day (Brazil)
- Shichi-Go-San (Japan)
- Republic Day (Northern Cyprus)
- The beginning of Nativity Fast (Eastern Orthodox)
