= 7 Billion Actions =

Anti-natalist organization

7 Billion Actions Campaign
- Formation: 2011
- Headquarters: New York City
- Location: Global
- Official language: English
- Key people: Babatunde Osotimehin (Executive Director, UNFPA)
- Website: 7billionactions.org

7 Billion Actions is a worldwide campaign established by the United Nations Population Fund (UNFPA) in 2011 to commemorate the world population milestone of 7 billion people. UNFPA is a United Nations organization that works on population and development issues, with an emphasis on reproductive health and gender equality. 7 Billion Actions works with multiple corporations, organizations and individuals to address the 7 Key Issues such as poverty, gender equality, youth, ageing, urbanization, environment, and reproductive health and rights. The UN has declared the World Population surpassing 7 billion on 31 October 2011. Prior to this date, the UN celebrated the Day of Six Billion in October 1999.

== Day of Seven Billion ==
Estimated and projected populations of the world and its continents (except Antarctica) from 1950. The shaded regions correspond to the range of projections by the United Nations Department of Economic and Social Affairs.

The Day of Seven Billion, October 31, 2011, is the day that has been officially designated by the United Nations Population Fund (UNFPA) as the approximate day on which the total world population reached a population of seven billion people. United Nations Secretary-General Ban Ki-moon spoke at the United Nations building in New York City on this milestone in the size of world population about the issues that it will raise, along with promoting 7 Billion Actions.

== Campaign goals ==
The 7 Billion Actions Campaign aims to raise awareness of key population issues such as reproductive health, poverty, women empowerment, youth, environment sustainability, ageing, and urbanization, by encouraging people to take action and recommit to humanity.

The campaign will count and showcase 7 billion online and offline actions that tell the story of the people behind the number and the connections they share with each other and the issues they each face.

== 7 key issues ==
The 7 Billion Actions Campaign centers on highlighting individuals and organizations making a significant impact and creating innovative solutions in the 7 key issues identified as most imperative for the growing global population.

1. Poverty and Inequality: Breaking the Cycle
  "Reducing poverty and inequality also slows population growth."
2. Women and Girls: Empowerment and Progress
  "Investing in the power of women and girls will accelerate progress on all fronts."
3. Young People: Forging the Future
  "Energetic and open to new technologies, history’s largest and most interconnected population of young people is transforming global politics and culture."
4. Reproductive Health and Rights: The Facts of Life
  "Ensuring that every child is wanted and every childbirth safe leads to smaller and stronger families."
5. Environment: Healthy Planet, Healthy People
  "Demands for water, trees, food and fossil fuels will only increase as world population grows to 7 billion and beyond."
6. Ageing: An Unprecedented Challenge
  "Lower fertility and longer life expectancy add up to a new challenge worldwide: ageing populations."
7. Urbanization: Planning for Growth
  "The next two billion people will live in cities, so we need to plan for them now."

== Main campaign components ==
7BillionActions.org: Showcases stories, interviews, and news. In-depth platform to help individuals connect and take action with efforts taking place near them or across the globe. Interactive data visualizations highlighting challenges and solutions.

I Count: An online and SMS/mobile effort allowing anyone to share what issues matter to them.

World Story Book: A community-created collection of photos, text, audio, and video that tell the stories of struggle and success of the people behind the number.

7Billion Hashtag (#7Billion): An ongoing social media conversation on Twitter, Facebook, and other major social media platforms (representing each major region) designed to help fuel awareness, engagement, and participation.

== Corporate, NGO, and media partnerships ==
IBM: As a way to celebrate its 100th anniversary, IBM is launching its Global Celebration of Service, a worldwide volunteer service initiative which calls for staff to donate their time and energy to specific social causes. 7 Billion Actions will be presented as one of the official programs which staff can support. As part of the new partnership, IBM volunteers will contribute their engineering, marketing, communications, social media and analytics expertise to help build the 7 Billion Actions campaign platform.

crowdSPRING: crowdSPRING launched a series of design competitions to crowd source the official logo for the 7 Billion Actions Campaign. The first round of the competition drew over one thousand submissions and the winning design will become the 7 Billion Action Campaign's official global logo. The next phase will open voting to the public in order to select a group of regionally themed logos.

National Geographic: This partnership includes a special feature in each 2011 issue, traveling photography exhibit, videos, the Happy 7 Billionth Baby project, and other related initiatives.

Blog Talk Radio: Using their telephone-to-internet platform, the 7 Billion Actions Campaign will launch the Conversations for a World at 7 Billion channel to showcase a variety of audio programs discussing the topics and themes facing the 7 billion. People in different countries and regions will have the opportunity listen to and call into these programs and share their stories and actions.

Playing for Change: The non-profit group the Playing for Change Foundation will partner with 7 Billion Actions to produce an official campaign song.

== Timeline ==
February 26–27, 2011	Social Media Bootcamp	A gathering of leaders from media, corporations, NGOs, universities, and grassroots organizations laid the foundations for 7 Billion Actions, focusing primarily on the social media aspects of the campaign.
July 11, 2011	World Population Day	7 Billion Actions launched a number of online and offline initiatives to celebrate World Population Day, which was established by the United Nations Development Programme in 1989.
October 24, 2011	United Nations Day	On October 24, 2011, the 7 Billion Actions Campaign launched a 7-day countdown leading up to the birth of the 7 billionth baby on October 31.
October 31, 2011	Projected Birthday of the 7 Billionth Baby	Events of the 7-day countdown culminated with the launch of 2011's State of World Population Report, which analyzes challenges and opportunities presented by a world of 7 billion.
