= 7 Billion =

7 billion or Seven billion may refer to:

- 7 Billion Actions, A campaign to commemorate the world's population reaching 7 billion
- 7 Billion Needles, A Japanese manga
- 7 Billion Others, A video series by Yann Arthus-Bertrand
- Day of Seven Billion, the day when the world's population reached 7 billion
- 7 000 000 000, a 2021 rock album by Hurd
