= Public holidays in Northern Cyprus =

Public holidays in Northern Cyprus are often shared with Turkey. The public holidays include:

Date	English name	Turkish name	Remarks
1 January	New Year's Day	Yılbaşı	
23 April	National Sovereignty and Children's Day	Ulusal Egemenlik ve Çocuk Bayramı	Shared with Turkey, commemorates the opening of the Grand National Assembly of Turkey at Ankara in 1920.
1 May	Labour Day	İşçi ve Bahar Bayramı	
19 May	Commemoration of Atatürk, Youth and Sports Day	Atatürk'ü Anma, Gençlik ve Spor Bayramı	Shared with Turkey, commemorates the beginning of the liberation movement initiated in 1919 by Atatürk's landing in Samsun.
20 July	Peace and Freedom Day	Barış ve Özgürlük Bayramı	Anniversary of start of the Turkish invasion of Cyprus
1 August	Social Resistance Day	Ulusal Direniş Bayramı	Anniversary of the founding of the Turkish Resistance Organization
30 August	Victory Day (Turkey)	Zafer Bayramı	Shared with Turkey, commemorates the victory at the Battle of Dumlupinar ending the Turkish War of Independence in 1922.
29 October	Republic Day (Turkey)	Cumhuriyet Bayramı	Shared with Turkey
15 November	Republic Day (Northern Cyprus)	Cumhuriyet Bayramı	Commemorates the Declaration of Independence
12 Rabi' al-Awwal	Mawlid	Mevlid Kandili	Birthday of the Islamic prophet Muhammad
1–2 Shawwal	Eid al-Fitr	Ramazan Bayramı	Celebration marking the official end to the fasting month of Ramadan
10–13 Dhu al-Hijjah	Eid al-Adha	Kurban Bayramı	Commemorates the willingness of Ibrahim to sacrifice his son and coincides with the annual Hajj pilgrimage
