= Day of Eight Billion =

When the human population reached 8 billion

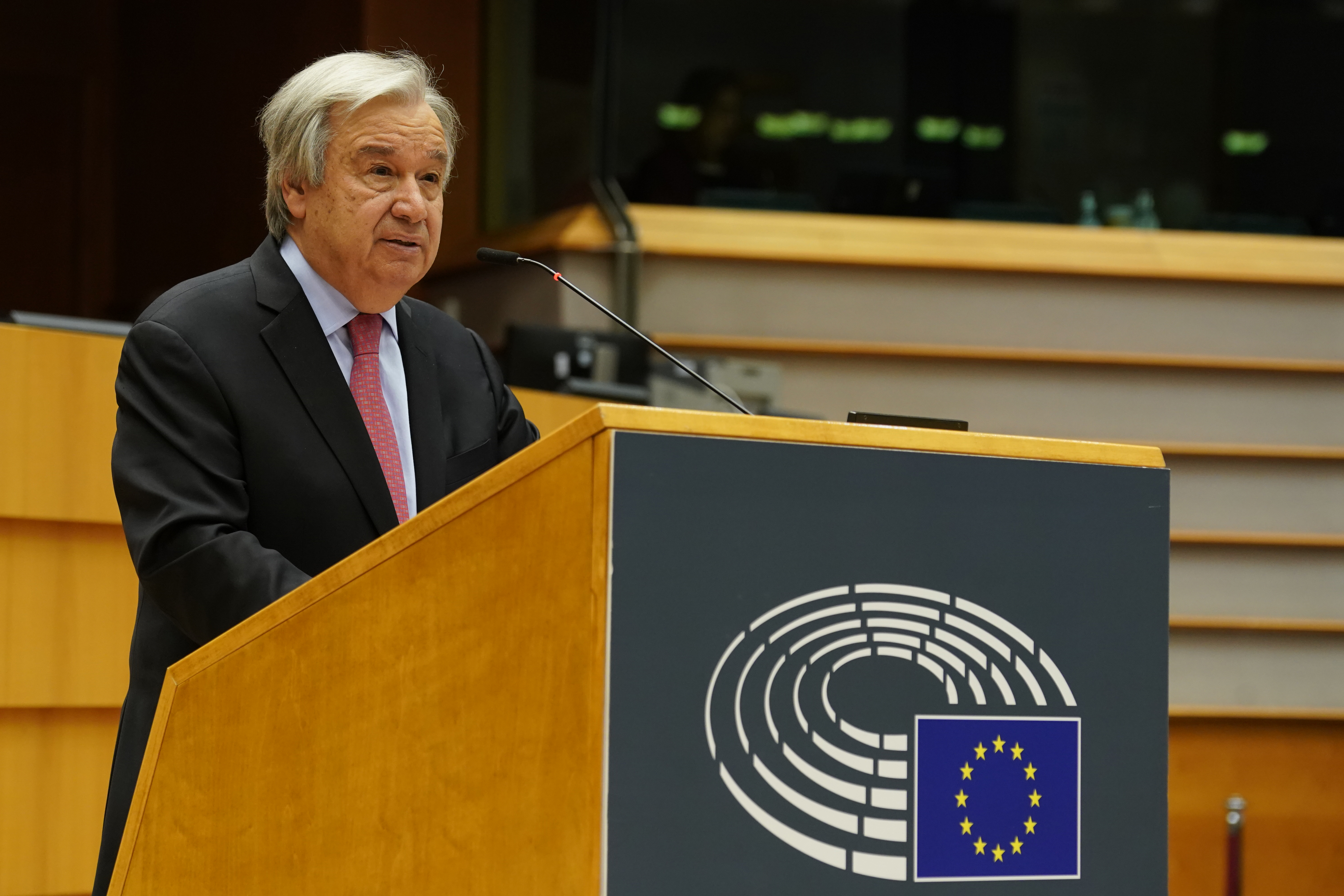
António Guterres has described the milestone as an occasion to celebrate diversity and advancements while considering humanity's shared responsibility for the planet.

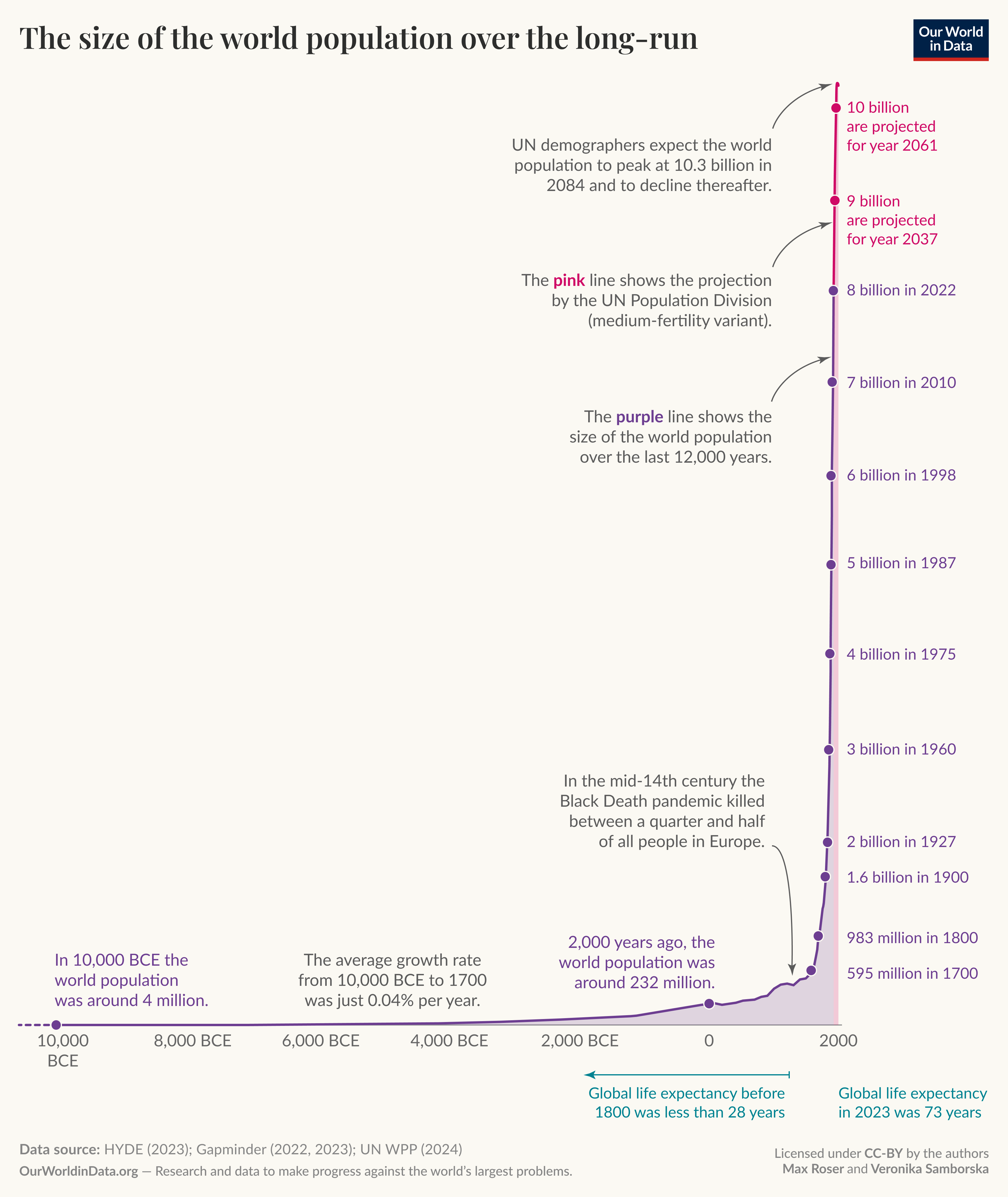
Global historical population growth according to Our World in Data

The Day of Eight Billion, marked on 15 November 2022, was designated by the United Nations as the approximate day when the world population reached eight billion people.

UN Secretary-General António Guterres described the milestone as an occasion to "celebrate our diversity, recognize our common humanity, and marvel at advancements in health" while considering "our shared responsibility to care for our planet and ... one another".

The date was selected based on data projections by the United Nations Department of Economic and Social Affairs (UN DESA).

== Background ==
Name	Year	Years elapsed
Day of 3 Billion	1960	–
Day of 4 Billion	1974	14
Day of 5 Billion	1987	13
Day of 6 Billion	1999	12
Day of 7 Billion	2011	12
Day of 8 Billion	2022	11

The world population's growth to eight billion people in 2022 – up from five billion in 1987, six billion in 1999, and seven billion in 2011 – reflects positive developments across fields such as global health and poverty eradication. Significant reductions in global infant and maternal mortality rates, especially in the 21st century, have led to dramatic increases in global life expectancy – and therefore the overall population.

“This is a success story," UNFPA Executive Director Dr. Natalia Kanem said on World Population Day (11 July) 2022. "Our world, despite its challenges, is one where higher shares of people are educated and live healthier lives than at any previous point in history."

== Perspectives on the Day of Eight Billion ==
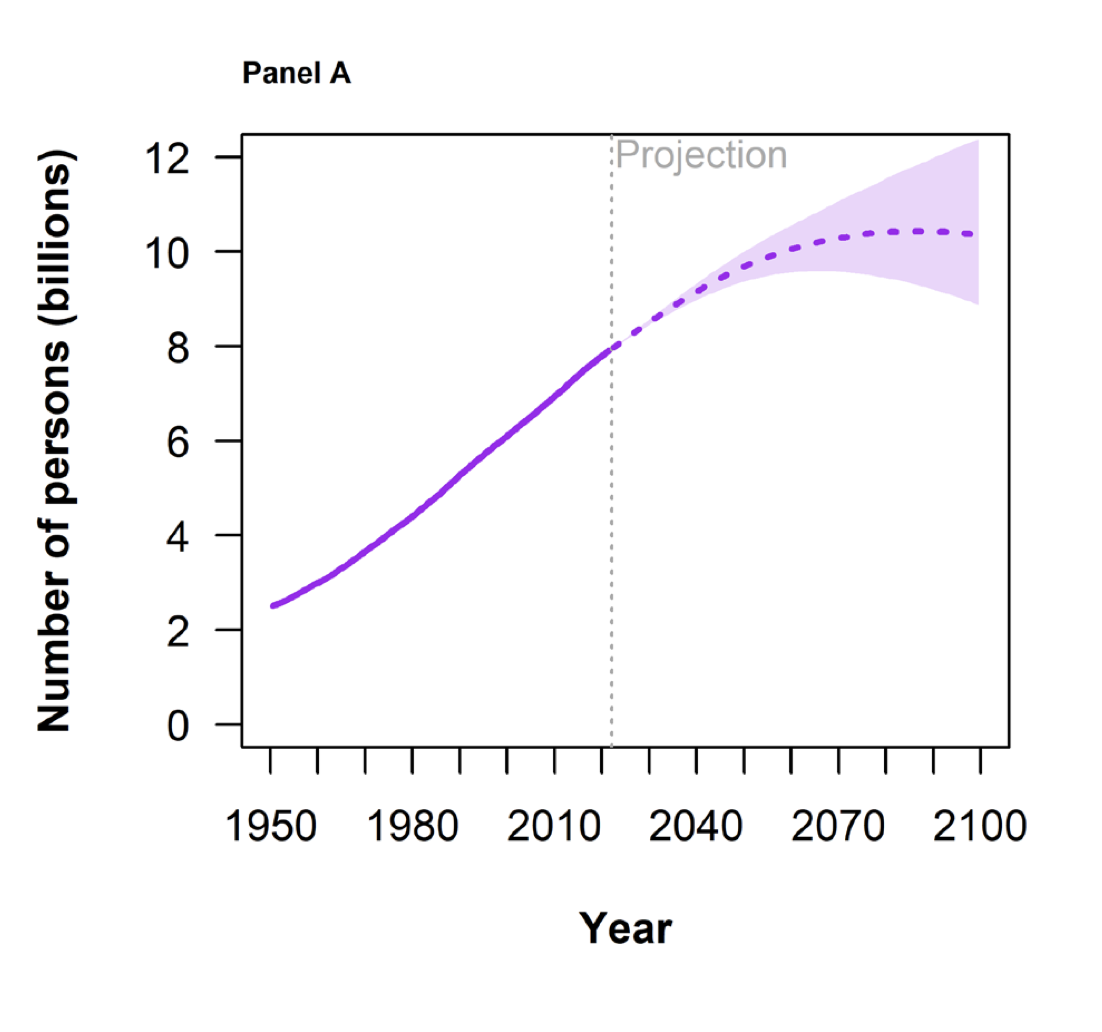
Global population size, estimates (1950–2022) and medium scenario with 95 percent prediction intervals, 2022–2100

Amid global challenges such as climate change and the COVID-19 pandemic, several observers, including David Attenborough, have expressed concerns about the future of the planet and its inhabitants as the population grows.

Throughout history, fears regarding overpopulation have often referenced the work of 18th-century economist Thomas Malthus, who predicted humanity's growth would outpace its ability to sustain itself with resources.

Others have pointed to declining fertility as a potential harbinger of demographic disaster. However, demography experts have challenged these theories, highlighting the diversity of countries’ population trends and the unlikelihood of any doomsday scenarios.

“Population growth is currently concentrated in the world’s poorest countries, while some of the richest countries are beginning to see population decline," UNFPA Senior Adviser of Economics and Demography Michael Herrmann wrote on 11 July 2022.

Overall, the UN Department of Economic and Social Affairs projects the global population will continue to grow, potentially peaking at an estimated 10.4 billion people during the 2080s – and staying there until 2100.

== Eight billionth person ==
The United Nations stated that they "can’t predict which exact baby will push us into the next billion". Nonetheless, the Philippines' Commission on Population and Development selected Vinice Mabansag, a baby girl born in Manila, as the symbolic eight billionth person on Earth.

== See also ==
- World population
- Day of Six Billion – 12 October 1999
- Day of Seven Billion – 31 October 2011
