= Day of Six Billion =

When the human population reached 6 billion

The United Nations Population Fund designated 12 October 1999, as the approximate day on which world population reached six billion. It was officially designated The Day of Six Billion.

Demographers do not universally accept this date as being exact. In fact, there has been subsequent research which places the day of six billion to be nearer to 18 or 19 June 1999.

== See also ==
- World population
- Day of Seven Billion – 31 October 2011
- Day of Eight Billion – 15 November 2022
