= World population milestones =

Estimated (to 2011) and projected (from 2012) populations of the world and its inhabited continents. The shaded regions correspond to range of projections by the United Nations Department of Economic and Social Affairs.

World population milestones went unnoticed until the 20th century, since there was no reliable data on global population dynamics.

The population of the world reached:

- 1 billion in 1804 (994,234,545)
- 2 billion in 1927 (1,998,342,567)
- 3 billion in 1960 (2,997,567,890)
- 4 billion in 1975 (3,990,234,567)
- 5 billion in 1987 (4,988,234,567)
- 6 billion in 1999 (5,980,247,450)
- 7 billion in 2011 (6,990,234,567)
- 8 billion in 2022 (7,990,245,666)
- 9 billion by 2037–2043 (8,999,245,456)(estimate), 15 years after 8 billion
- 10 billion by 2056–2074 9,999,899,234(estimate), 19 years after 9 billion

However, these milestones are likely to be reached far sooner. Projected figures vary depending on underlying statistical assumptions and which variables are manipulated in projection calculations, especially the fertility variable. Long-range predictions to the year 2150 (more than a century from now) are uncertain and range from a low of 3 billion to a high of 25 billion.

World population milestones in billions (UN estimates)
Population	1	2	3	4	5	6	7	8	9	10
Year	1804	1927	1960	1974	1987	1999	2011	2022	2037	2058
Years elapsed	-	123	33	14	13	12	13	11	15	21

== Global billionth milestones ==
There is no estimation for the exact day or month the world's population surpassed the one and two billion marks. The days of three and four billion were not officially noted, but the International Database of the United States Census Bureau places them in July 1960 and April 1974 respectively.

=== Five billion ===
The Day of Five Billion, 11 July 1987, was designated by the United Nations Population Fund as the approximate day on which the world population reached five billion. Matej Gašpar from Zagreb, Croatia (then SR Croatia, SFR Yugoslavia), was chosen as the symbolic 5-billionth person alive on Earth. The honor went to Zagreb because the 1987 Summer Universiade was taking place in the city at the time.

=== Six billion ===
The United Nations Population Fund designated 12 October 1999 as the approximate day on which the world population reached six billion. It was officially designated "The Day of Six Billion", however demographers do not universally accept this date as being exact. In fact, there has been subsequent research which places the day of six billion nearer to 18 June or 19 June 1999. United Nations Population Fund spokesman Omar Gharzeddine disputed the date of the Day of Six Billion by stating, "The U.N. marked the '6 billionth' [person] in 1999, and then a couple of years later the Population Division itself reassessed its calculations and said, actually, no, it was in 1998."

On the Day of Six Billion, UN Secretary-General Kofi Annan was in Sarajevo, Bosnia and Herzegovina to monitor the Dayton Agreement. At midnight he went to Koševo Hospital, where Adnan Mević, born at 12:01 am, was named the symbolic 6 billionth concurrently alive person on Earth. He is the first son of Fatima Mević and Jasminko Mević and weighed 3.5 kg.

=== Seven billion ===
The "Day of Seven Billion" was targeted by the United States Census Bureau to be in March 2012, while the Population Division of the United Nations suggested 31 October 2011, and the latter date was officially designated by the United Nations Population Fund (UNFPA) as the approximate day on which the world's population reached seven billion people. United Nations Secretary General Ban Ki-moon spoke at the United Nations building in New York City on this milestone in the size of world population, and promoted the website 7 Billion Actions. Ban Ki-moon did not choose a symbolic seven billionth baby, but several groups proposed candidates: Nargis Kumar of Uttar Pradesh, India, Danica May Camacho of Manila, Philippines and Wattalage Muthumai of Colombo, Sri Lanka.

=== Eight billion ===
The "Day of Eight Billion" was targeted by the United Nations Department of Economic and Social Affairs, Population Division to be on 15 November 2022. Among babies born that day who were symbolically named as the world's eight billionth by various government agencies were: Vinice Mabansag (Tondo, Manila, Philippines); Damián Ferrera (Santo Domingo, Dominican Republic); Arpi Kocharyan (Tsovinar, Armenia) and the baby girl of Philomena Digbey (Accra, Ghana).

=== Future ===
The United Nations Population Fund predicts that the global population will reach 9 billion in 2037 and 10 billion in 2058.

== National and regional population ==
National or subnational governments have sometimes made similar designations based on the date estimated by a demographic agency. Some national milestones relate to citizens rather than residents. Commentators in countries with high immigration have pointed out that a population milestone may be reached by an immigrant rather than natural increase.

Country/nationality	Population	Born (date)	Name	Notes	Ref.
Munich	1m	15 December 1957	Thomas Seehaus	Awarded by Mayor Thomas Wimmer with a 1,000 mark savings account	
United States	200m	20 November 1967	Robert Ken Woo Jr	Named by Life magazine, not the government. None named for 300m.	
Australia	15m	29 January 1982	Sally Hodgson	Awarded by Minister for Immigration and Ethnic Affairs Ian Macphee	
Indonesia	200m	4 February 1997	Wahyu Nusantara Aji	Complains that government promises of support were not kept. But, this was because of the difference of federal/central government policy during New Order and Reformasi (Otonomi Daerah).	
India	1b	11 May 2000	Aastha Arora	Awarded Independence Day 1999, till Registrar demurred. Complaints that government promises of support were not kept.	
Kyrgyzstan	5m	27 August 2002	Tynchtykbek Kuramayev		
Australia	21m	29 June 2007	Mia Ruby Templeton	Awarded by Treasurer Peter Costello	
Taiwan	23m	17 July 2008	Wu Cheng-en	Awarded certificate from Premier of the Republic of China Liu Chao-shiuan	
Auckland Region, New Zealand	1.65m	June 2022	Ramonah Patience Toomalatai	Welcomed by Len Brown the Mayor of Auckland	
Kazakhstan	17m	17 May 2013	Altynbek Eskaraev Алтынбек Ескараев		
Vietnam	90m	1 November 2013	Nguyễn Thị Thùy Dung	Randomly chosen by the General Office of Population and Family Planning from among two dozen babies born that day	
Philippines	100m	27 July 2014	Chonalyn Sentino	Awarded free Philhealth lifetime coverage by the government and access to healthcare by the DOH	
Wake County, North Carolina	1m	22 August 2014	Anderson Grace Hughes	Offered full scholarship by Wake Technical Community College	
Mongolia	3m	24 January 2015	Mongoljin Khatanbold		
Silicon Valley	3m	5 May 2015	Max Danner		
Utah	3m	24 October 2015	Sadie Christensen	Awarded by Governor Gary Herbert	
Kyrgyzstan	6m	27 November 2015	Aylin Kojosheva		
Egypt	100m	11 February 2020	Yasmine Rabie		

== See also ==
- U.S. and World Population Clock
- World Population History
- Estimates of historical world population
