= 655 =

Calendar year

655 in various calendars
- Gregorian calendar: 655; DCLV
- Ab urbe condita: 1408
- Armenian calendar: 104; ԹՎ ՃԴ
- Assyrian calendar: 5405
- Balinese saka calendar: 576–577
- Bengali calendar: 61–62
- Berber calendar: 1605
- Buddhist calendar: 1199
- Burmese calendar: 17
- Byzantine calendar: 6163–6164
- Chinese calendar: 甲寅年 (Wood Tiger); 3352 or 3145 — to — 乙卯年 (Wood Rabbit); 3353 or 3146
- Coptic calendar: 371–372
- Discordian calendar: 1821
- Ethiopian calendar: 647–648
- Hebrew calendar: 4415–4416
- Hindu calendars
- Vikram Samvat: 711–712
- Shaka Samvat: 576–577
- Kali Yuga: 3755–3756
- Holocene calendar: 10655
- Iranian calendar: 33–34
- Islamic calendar: 34–35
- Japanese calendar: Hakuchi 6 (白雉６年)
- Javanese calendar: 546–547
- Julian calendar: 655; DCLV
- Korean calendar: 2988
- Minguo calendar: 1257 before ROC 民前1257年
- Nanakshahi calendar: −813
- Seleucid era: 966/967 AG
- Thai solar calendar: 1197–1198
- Tibetan calendar: ཤིང་ཕོ་སྟག་ལོ་ (male Wood-Tiger); 781 or 400 or −372 — to — ཤིང་མོ་ཡོས་ལོ་ (female Wood-Hare); 782 or 401 or −371

Anglo-Saxon England (c. 650)

Year 655 (DCLV) was a common year starting on Thursday of the Julian calendar. The denomination 655 for this year has been used since the early medieval period, when the Anno Domini calendar era became the prevalent method in Europe for naming years.

== Events ==
=== By place ===
==== Byzantine Empire ====
- Battle of the Masts: Emperor Constans II personally commands the Byzantine fleet (500 ships), and sets off to challenge the Arab navy. He sails to the province of Lycia (now in Turkey) in the southern region of Asia Minor. The two forces meet off the coast of Mount Phoenix, near the harbour of Phoenix (modern Finike). The Arabs under Abdullah ibn Sa'ad are victorious in battle, although losses are heavy for both sides. Constans barely escapes to Constantinople.

==== Britain ====
- November 15 – Battle of the Winwaed: King Oswiu of Bernicia defeats his rival, King Penda of Mercia at Cock Beck, near what later will be Leeds (Yorkshire). Kings Cadafael Cadomedd of Gwynedd and Œthelwald of Deira, allies of Mercia, withdraw their forces before the battle begins. It marks the defeat of the last credible pagan force in England. It also sows the seeds which will lead to Anglo-Saxon acceptance of the Catholic Church (approximate date).
- Oswiu becomes overlord (bretwalda) over much of Great Britain. He establishes himself as king of Mercia, setting up his son-in-law, Penda's son Peada, as a subject king over Middle Anglia.

==== Asia ====
- Empress Kōgyoku re-ascends to the throne of Japan, beginning a new reign as Saimei-tennō.
- Arab armies conquer Khurasan (Iran), and the Silk Road along Transoxiana (Central Asia).
- King Vikramaditya I of Chalukya (India) re-unites the kingdom, after defeating his brothers.

=== By topic ===
==== Religion ====
- May 15 – Pope Martin I is banished to Chersonesos Taurica (Ukraine). He dies later in the Crimean Peninsula after a 6-year reign, leaving Eugene I as the uncontested pope (see 654).
- Peada founds Peterborough Cathedral (Province of Canterbury). It becomes one of the first centres of Christianity in England. Deusdedit is consecrated as archbishop of Canterbury.

== Births ==
- John VI, pope of Rome (d. 705)

== Deaths ==
- September 16 – Pope Martin I
- November 15 – Æthelhere, king of East Anglia
- November 15 – Penda, king of Mercia
- Cadafael Cadomedd, king of Gwynedd
- Didier of Cahors, Frankish bishop
- Foillan, Irish missionary (approximate date)
- Loingsech mac Colmáin, king of Connacht (Ireland)
- Theodore Rshtuni, Armenian general
- Wang, empress of the Tang dynasty
- Xiao, concubine of Gao Zong
