= Republic Day (Northern Cyprus) =

Public holiday in Northern Cyprus

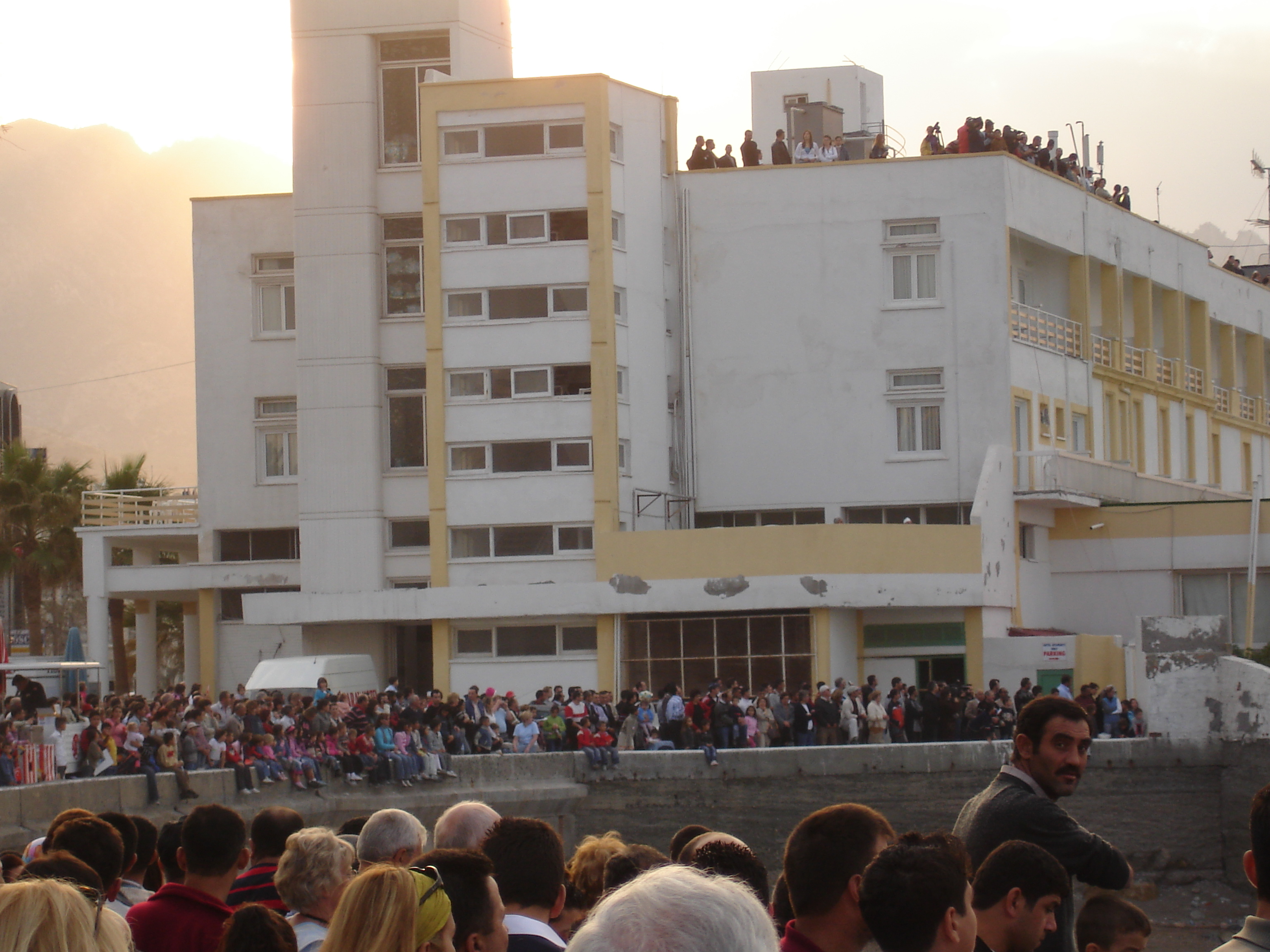
- Turkish Cypriots watching Turkish Stars show in Kyrenia harbour on 15 November 2005.
- Official name: Cumhuriyet Bayramı (Turkish)
- Type: National
- Significance: The day in 1983 that the Turkish Republic of Northern Cyprus was declared
- Date: 15 November
- Next time: 15 November 2025
- Frequency: Annual

Republic Day (Turkish: Cumhuriyet Bayramı) is a public holiday in Northern Cyprus commemorating the declaration of the Turkish Republic of Northern Cyprus on 15 November 1983. The annual celebrations begin at 12:00 a.m on 14 November and continue until 15 November. On 15 November, celebrations are made in all districts of country and representatives from several countries, especially Turkey, visit Northern Cyprus and attend the celebrations. The main celebration locations are the Kemal Atatürk Memorial, the Nicosia Martyrs Memorial in Nicosia, and the tomb of Fazıl Küçük.
