= Crowdspring =

crowdSPRING, LLC
- Type: Private
- Industry: Design
- Founded: May 2007
- Founder: Ross Kimbarowsky; Mike Samson
- Headquarters: Chicago, Illinois, USA
- Area served: Worldwide
- Products: Custom Logo Design, Website Design, Illustration, Marketing Materials, Industrial Design, Copywriting
- Number of employees: 70
- Website: www.crowdspring.com

Crowdspring (written "crowdSPRING", legally crowdSPRING, LLC) is an online marketplace for crowdsourced creative services.

== Overview ==
Crowdspring was co-founded in May 2007 by Ross Kimbarovsky and Michael Samson. Crowdspring launched its online marketplace publicly in May 2008. Crowdspring is based in Chicago.

More than 200,000 graphic designers and writers from 200 countries work on Crowdspring.

== Blog ==
Crowdspring maintains a blog which was launched in mid-2008.

Crowdspring has faced ongoing criticism regarding its speculative business model, which involves asking designers and writers to submit completed work with no guarantee of payment unless their submission is selected. Critics argue that this practice can result in many contributors effectively working without compensation, despite Crowdspring collecting fees from clients.

In some cases, participants have expressed frustration with delayed or missing payments, further fueling criticism about fairness and transparency on the platform. Crowdspring has responded to such feedback by stating that they provide a global platform to connect creatives with businesses and offer opportunities to grow their portfolios.
