= Day of Seven Billion =

When the human population reached 7 billion

	October
Su	Mo	Tu	We	Th	Fr	Sa
						1
2	3	4	5	6	7	8
9	10	11	12	13	14	15
16	17	18	19	20	21	22
23	24	25	26	27	28	29
30	31
2011

Estimated (to 2011) and projected (from 2012) populations of the world and its inhabited continents. The shaded regions correspond to range of projections by the United Nations Department of Economic and Social Affairs; for example, the chart showed that the world population would reach 8 billion people between 2021 and 2035

The Day of Seven Billion, 31 October 2011, is the day that was officially designated by the United Nations Population Fund (UNFPA) as the approximate day on which the world's population reached seven billion people. United Nations Secretary General Ban Ki-moon spoke at the United Nations building in New York City on this new milestone in the size of world population and the issues that it will raise, along with promoting the UNFPA's new program named 7 Billion Actions, which will seek to "build global awareness around the opportunities and challenges associated with a world of seven billion people" and inspire individuals and organizations to take action. It was succeeded by the Day of Eight Billion on 15 November 2022.

== Background ==
Population	Year	Years elapsed since previous milestone
1 billion	1804	––
2 billion	1927	123
3 billion	1960	33
4 billion	1974	14
5 billion	July 11, 1987	13
6 billion	October 12, 1999	12
7 billion	October 31, 2011	12
8 billion	November 15, 2022	11
9 billion	2038	16
10 billion	2058	20
World population milestones (USCB estimates)

The world had already reached a population of five billion on 11 July 1987, and six billion, twelve years later on 12 October 1999.

United Nations Population Fund spokesman Omar Gharzeddine disputed the date of the Day of Six Billion by stating, "The U.N. marked the '6 billionth' [person] in 1999, and then a couple of years later the Population Division itself reassessed its calculations and said, actually, no, it was in 1998."

== Choice of date ==
According to the United Nations Department of Economic and Social Affairs Population Division, 31 October 2011 is a symbolic date chosen based on data interpolated from its 5-year-period estimates. The estimates are based on data sources such as recent censuses, surveys, vital and population registers, and are published every other year as part of its World Population Prospects.

The actual date that the world population reached 7 billion had an error margin of around 12 months owing to inaccuracies in demographic statistics, particularly in some developing countries (even the world's best censuses have 1–2% error). Assuming a 1% global error margin, the 7 billion world population could have been reached as early as 20 March 2011, or as late as 12 April 2012.

However, the International Programs Division of the United States Census Bureau estimated that the total world population would not reach 7 billion until sometime on 12 March 2012. It also offered an estimate that differed by about three months from the UN estimate for the Day of Six Billion.

The International Institute for Applied Systems Analysis estimated a date between February 2012 and July 2014.

== Seven billionth person ==
United Nations Population Fund spokesman Omar Gharzeddine said, "There's no way that the U.N. or anyone could know where or at what minute on the 31st the 7 billionth baby will be born", and that the United Nations would not be giving official status to this and similar publicity efforts. Nevertheless, several newborns were selected by various groups to represent the seven billionth person.

On the Day of Seven Billion, the group Plan International symbolically marked the birth of the 7 billionth human with a ceremony in the Indian state of Uttar Pradesh where a birth certificate was presented to a newly born baby girl, Nargis Kumar, to protest sex-selective abortion in the state. The Indian girl-to-boy ratio for 0–6-year-olds is at 914 girls per 1,000 boys nationwide, with Uttar Pradesh's one of the lowest at 889 girls for every thousand boys.

Other babies selected include Danica May Camacho, born in the Dr. Jose Fabella Memorial Hospital, Manila, Philippines just before midnight on the eve of the Day of Seven Billion, and Wattalage Muthumai, of Colombo, Sri Lanka.

== See also ==
- World population
- Day of Six Billion – 12 October 1999
- Day of Eight Billion – 15 November 2022
