= Michael Woythe =

German footballer and manager

Personal information
- Full name: Michael Woythe
- Date of birth: 15 November 1957 (age 68)
- Place of birth: Berlin, Germany
- Position: Midfielder

Senior career*
Years	Team	Apps	(Gls)
1976–1977	SC Wacker 04 Berlin	9	(0)
1978	SG Wattenscheid 09	9	(0)
- Tennis Borussia Berlin
- Hertha Zehlendorf
- SC Gatow

Managerial career
- –2003: Berlin AK 07
- –2009: SSV Sprakensehl
- 2009–2010: Tennis Borussia Berlin II
- 2010: TuS 1896 Sachsenhausen
- * Club domestic league appearances and goals

Michael Woythe (born 15 November 1957 in Berlin) is a German football manager and former player.

Woythe made a total of 18 2. Fußball-Bundesliga appearances in the late 1970s for SC Wacker 04 Berlin and SG Wattenscheid 09.
