= World population =

Total number of living humans on Earth

External videos
- Why Most Humans Live Inside This Small Circle -RealLifeLore

High, medium, and low projections of the future human world population

In world demographics, the world population is the total number of humans currently alive. It was estimated by the United Nations to have exceeded 8 billion (8,000,000,000) on November 15, 2022. It took around 300,000 years of human prehistory and history for the human population to reach a billion and only 218 more years from there to reach 8 billion. As of 2026, the world population is approximately 8.3 billion. However, this figure is only a very rough approximation (see § History).

The human population experienced continuous growth following the Great Famine of 1315–1317 and the end of the Black Death in 1350, when it had reached nearly 370 million. The highest global population growth rates, with increases of over 1.8% per year, occurred between 1955 and 1975, peaking at 2.1% between 1965 and 1970. The growth rate declined to 1.1% between 2015 and 2020 and is projected to decline further in the 21st century. The global population is still increasing, but there is significant uncertainty about its long-term trajectory due to changing fertility and mortality rates. The UN Department of Economics and Social Affairs (UNDESA) has projected the world population to reach between 9 and 10 billion people by 2050, providing an 80% confidence interval of 10–12 billion by the end of the 21st century, with a growth rate by then of zero. However, other demographers predict that the human population may begin to decline in the second half of the 21st century if global fertility rates continue to fall.

The total number of births globally, as of 2024, is approximately 132 million/year, which is projected to peak during the period 2040–2045 at 141 million/year and then decline slowly to 126 million/year by 2100. The total number of deaths is currently 63 million/year and is projected to grow steadily to 122 million/year by 2100.

The global median age of human beings, as of 2026, is 31.1 years.

== History ==
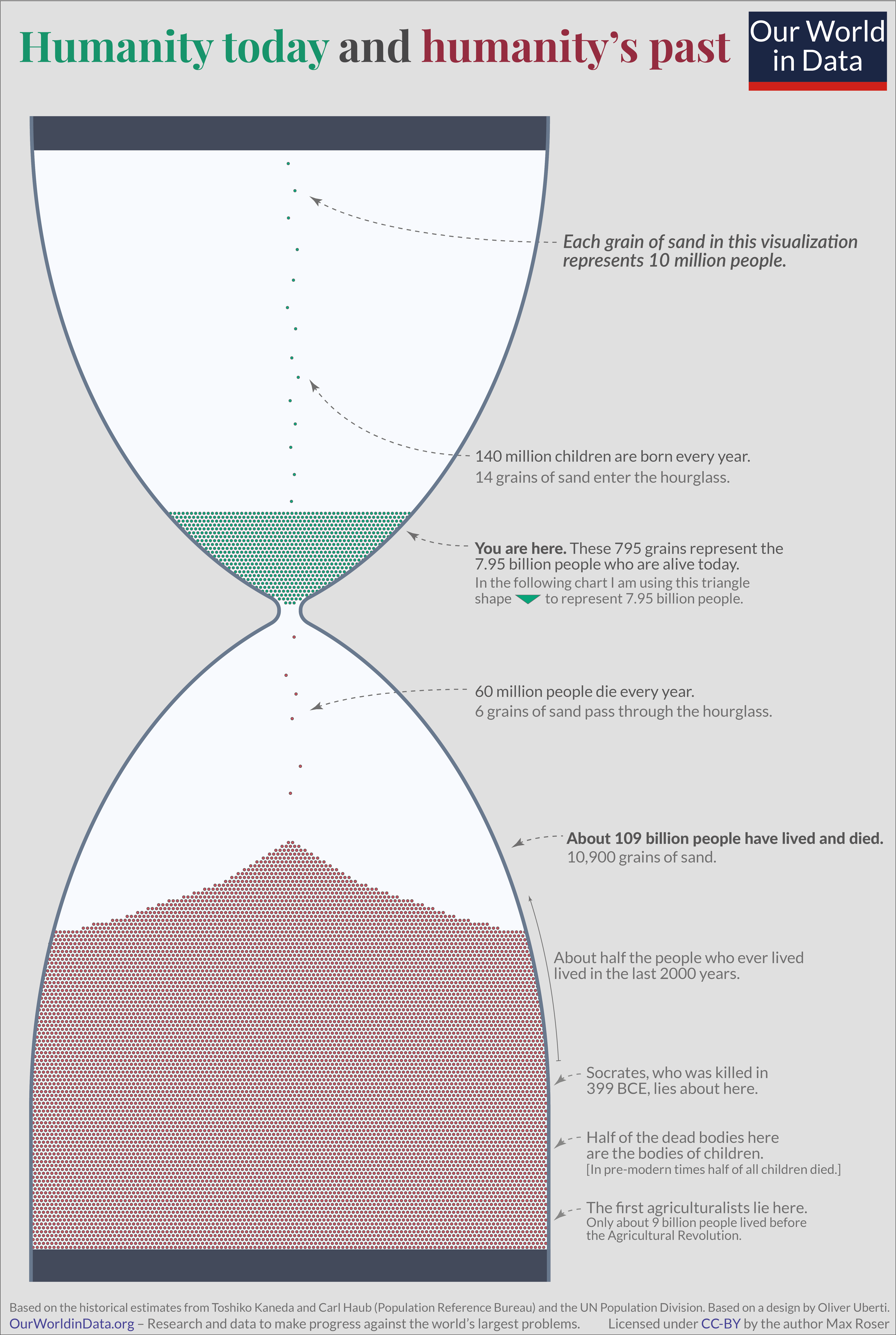
Visual comparison of the world population in past and present

Estimates of world population by their nature are an aspect of modernity, possible only since the Age of Discovery. Early estimates for the population of the world date to the 17th century: William Petty, in 1682, estimated the world population at 320 million (current estimates ranging close to twice this number); by the late 18th century, estimates ranged close to one billion (consistent with current estimates). More refined estimates, broken down by continents, were published in the first half of the 19th century, at 600 million to 1 billion in the early 1800s and 800 million to 1 billion in the 1840s.

It is difficult for estimates to be better than rough approximations, as even current population estimates are fraught with uncertainties from 3% to 5%.

=== Prehistoric patterns ===
The history of the world's population involves a great deal of speculation. Before 9000 BC, virtually all humans were hunter-gatherers living in small bands that usually verged on the edge of extinction. Survival depended on the capture of hunted animals; if supply of animals dwindled for any reason, humans would starve; if the human population grew too large the number of surviving animals would shrink, leading to starvation the next year for the hunters (humans had not yet invented the technique of domesticating and herding animals). The hunting cultures sometimes fished, and usually gathered wild seeds and nuts, but they did not plant or grow vegetables or any other crops. One very rough estimate is 8 million hunters lived circa 9000 BC when the first of several "agricultural revolutions" occurred in the eastern hemisphere (the dates are very conjectural). Around the year 9000 BC in the Middle East, for reasons unknown, some groups began to domesticate and graze sheep. The practice of cultivating plants was invented independently in three places: in the Middle East and Europe (wheat, 6500–3500 BC), in Southeast Asia (rice, 6800–4000 BC), and in Central America and Peru (corn, about 2500 BC).

Agriculture provided a steady food supply that could be stored for a year or longer in order to minimize the risk of famine. Farm production could be expanded by systematic human exertion. The new technology of farming meant that the food supply was proportional to the number of workers who could plant and harvest the crops. Every new pair of hands meant more food for the community, so children were valued in agricultural societies. Later, additional workers found useful work in building irrigation canals and systems that provided a stable water supply for crops, especially in Egypt, Mesopotamia, India, China, Peru and Mexico. The population could now grow because new people paid their own way. (It would take many centuries before the arable land supply became a limiting factor.) However, death rates were high, especially for infants and children, so even with high birth rates growth was slow. The same amount of land could support either 1,000 hunters or 100,000 farmers, and thus farmers ultimately won the fight for the land. Farmers gathered in permanent villages, and through a process of warfare consolidated into much larger states, including those in China, India, Egypt and Mesopotamia. From 300 to 1400 AD large agricultural states also existed throughout the eastern United States, called the "Hopewell tradition" and "Mississippian cultures". They are most famous as Mound Builders, but their culture collapsed (for unknown reasons) by 1500. The natives encountered by the English and French were nomadic hunters who supplemented their meat diet with cultivated vegetables.

=== Ancient and post-classical history ===
Graph of human population from 10 000 BC to 2000 AD. It shows exponential rise in world population that has taken place since the end of the seventeenth century.

Estimates of the population of the world at the time agriculture emerged in around 10,000 BC have ranged between 1 million and 15 million. Even earlier, genetic evidence suggests humans may have gone through a population bottleneck of between 1,000 and 10,000 people about 70,000 BC, according to the now largely discredited Toba catastrophe theory. By contrast, it is estimated that around 50–60 million people lived in the combined eastern and western Roman Empire in the 4th century AD.

The Plague of Justinian caused Europe's population to drop by around 50% between the 6th and 8th centuries AD. The population of Europe was more than 70 million in 1340. From 1340 to 1400, the world's population fell from an estimated 443 million to 350–375 million, with the Indian subcontinent suffering the most tremendous loss and Europe suffering the Black Death pandemic; it took 200 years for European population figures to recover. The population of China decreased from 123 million in 1200 to 65 million in 1393, presumably from a combination of Mongol invasions, famine, and plague.

Starting in AD 2, the Han dynasty of ancient China kept consistent family registers to properly assess the poll taxes and labor service duties of each household. In that year, the population of Western Han was recorded as 57,671,400 individuals in 12,366,470 households, decreasing to 47,566,772 individuals in 9,348,227 households by AD 146, towards the end of the Han dynasty. From 200 to 400, the world population fell from an estimated 257 million to 206 million, with China suffering the greatest loss. At the founding of the Ming dynasty in 1368, China's population was reported to be close to 60 million; toward the end of the dynasty in 1644, it may have approached 150 million. England's population reached an estimated 5.6 million in 1650, up from an estimated 2.6 million in 1500. New crops that were brought to Asia and Europe from the Americas by Portuguese and Spanish colonists in the 16th century are believed to have contributed to population growth. Since their introduction to Africa by Portuguese traders in the 16th century, maize and cassava have similarly replaced traditional African crops as the most important staple food crops grown on the continent.

The pre-Columbian population of the Americas is uncertain; historian David Henige called it "the most unanswerable question in the world." By the end of the 20th century, scholarly consensus favored an estimate of roughly 55 million people, but numbers from various sources have ranged from 10 million to 100 million. Encounters between European explorers and populations in the rest of the world often introduced local epidemics of extraordinary virulence. According to the most extreme scholarly claims, as many as 90% of the Native American population of the New World died of Old World diseases such as smallpox, measles, and influenza. Over the centuries, the Europeans had developed high degrees of immunity to these diseases, while the indigenous peoples had no such immunity.

=== Modern history ===
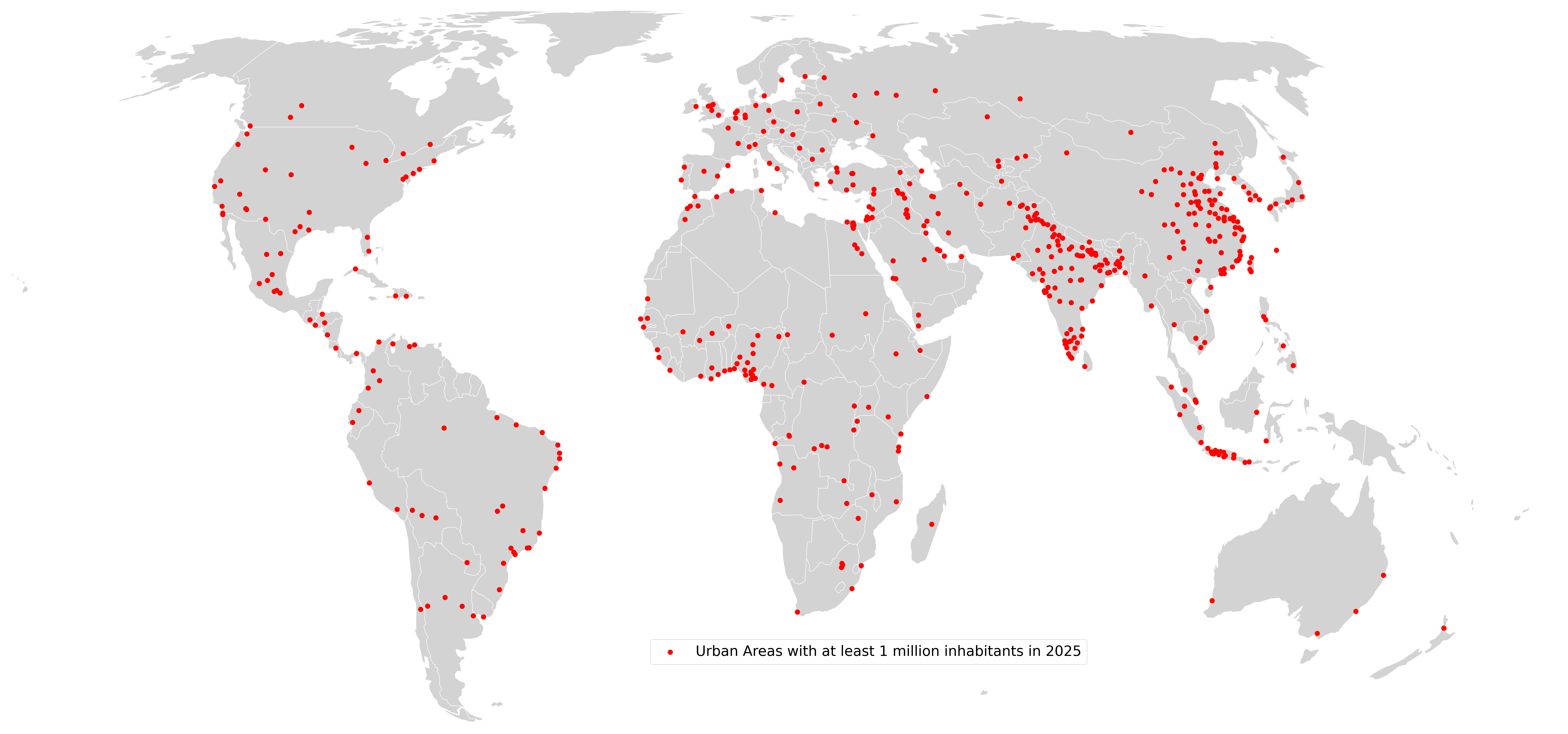
Map showing urban areas with at least one million inhabitants in 2025. Only 3% of the world's population lived in urban areas in 1800; this proportion had risen to 47% by 2000, and reached 56% by 2020.

During the European Agricultural and Industrial Revolutions, the life expectancy of children increased dramatically. The percentage of the children born in London who died before the age of five decreased from 74.5% in 1730–1749 to 31.8% in 1810–1829. Between 1700 and 1900, Europe's population increased from about 100 million to over 400 million. Altogether, the areas populated by people of European descent comprised 36% of the world's population in 1900.

Population growth in the Western world became more rapid after the introduction of vaccination and other improvements in medicine and sanitation. Improved material conditions led to the population of Britain increasing from 10 million to 40 million in the 19th century. The population of the United Kingdom reached 60 million in 2006. The United States saw its population grow from around 5.3 million in 1800 to 106 million in 1920, exceeding 307 million in 2010.

=== 20th century ===
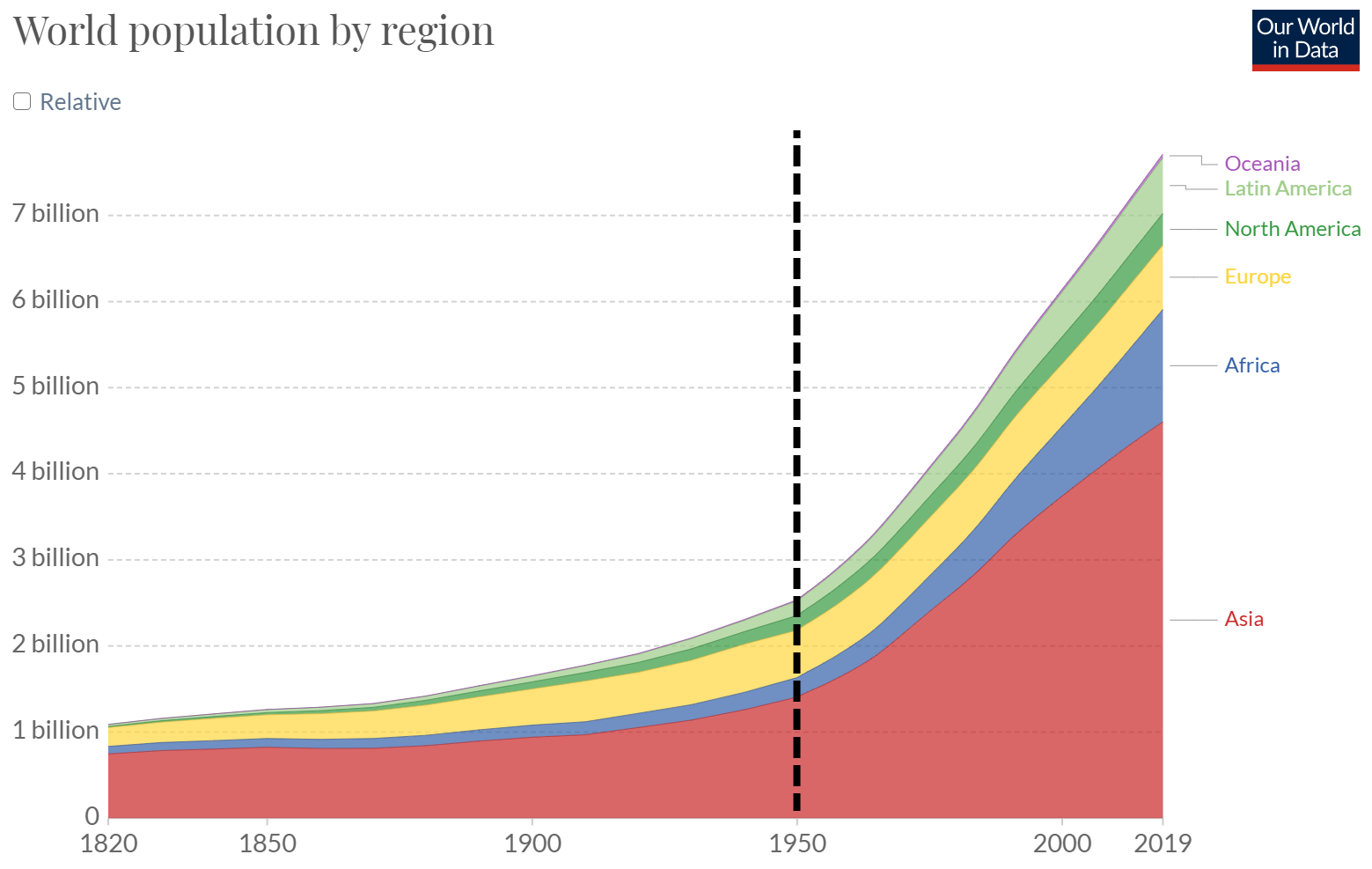
The human population grew by approximately 4.5 billion people during the 20th century, increasing from about 1.6 billion in 1900 to just over 6 billion by the year 2000.

The first half of the 20th century in Imperial Russia and the Soviet Union was marked by a succession of major wars, famines and other disasters which caused large-scale population losses (approximately 60 million excess deaths). After the collapse of the Soviet Union, Russia's population declined significantly – from 150 million in 1991 to 143 million in 2012 – but by 2013 this decline appeared to have halted.

Many countries in the developing world have experienced extremely rapid population growth since the early 20th century, due to economic development and improvements in public health. China's population rose from approximately 430 million in 1850 to 580 million in 1953, and now stands at over 1.3 billion. The population of the Indian subcontinent, which was about 125 million in 1750, increased to 389 million in 1941; today, India, Pakistan and Bangladesh are collectively home to about 1.63 billion people. Java, an island in Indonesia, had about 5 million inhabitants in 1815; it had a population of over 139 million in 2020. In just one hundred years, the population of Brazil decupled (x10), from about 17 million in 1900, or about 1% of the world population in that year, to about 176 million in 2000, or almost 3% of the global population in the very early 21st century. Mexico's population grew from 13.6 million in 1900 to about 112 million in 2010. Between the 1920s and 2000s, Kenya's population grew from 2.9 million to 37 million.

=== Milestones by the billions ===
World population milestones in billions (Worldometers estimates)
Population (in billions)	1	2	3	4	5	6	7	8	9	10
Year	1804	1927	1960	1974	1987	1999	2011	2022	2037	2057
Years elapsed	—	123	33	14	13	12	12	11	15	20

The UN estimated that the world population reached one billion for the first time in 1804. It was another 123 years before it reached two billion in 1927, but it took only 33 years to reach three billion in 1960. Thereafter, it took 14 years for the global population to reach four billion in 1974, 13 years to reach five billion in 1987, 12 years to reach six billion in 1999 and, according to the United States Census Bureau, 13 years to reach seven billion in March 2012. The United Nations, however, estimated that the world population reached seven billion in October 2011.

According to the UN, the global population reached eight billion in November 2022, but because the growth rate is slowing, it will take another 15 years to reach around 9 billion by 2037 and 20 years to reach 10 billion by 2057. Alternative scenarios for 2050 range from a low of 7.4 billion to a high of more than 10.6 billion. Projected figures vary depending on underlying statistical assumptions and the variables used in projection calculations, especially the fertility and mortality variables. Long-range predictions to 2150 range from a population decline to 3.2 billion in the "low scenario", to "high scenarios" of 24.8 billion. One extreme scenario predicted a massive increase to 256 billion by 2150, assuming the global fertility rate remained at its 1995 level of 3.04 children per woman; however, by 2010 the global fertility rate had declined to 2.52.

There is no estimation for the exact day or month the world's population surpassed one or two billion. The points at which it reached three and four billion were not officially noted, but the International Database of the United States Census Bureau placed them in July 1959 and April 1974 respectively. The United Nations did determine, and commemorate, the "Day of 5 Billion" on 11 July 1987, and the "Day of 6 Billion" on 12 October 1999. The Population Division of the United Nations declared the "Day of Seven Billion" to be 31 October 2011. The United Nations marked the birth of the eight billionth person on 15 November 2022.

== Global demographics ==
>80; 77.5–80; 75–77.5; 72.5–75; 70–72.5; 67.5–70; 65–67.5; 60–65; 55–60; 50–55; 2015 map showing average life expectancy by country in years. In 2015, the World Health Organization estimated the average global life expectancy as 71.4 years.

As of 2020, the global sex ratio is approximately 1.01 males to 1 female. Approximately 24.7% of the global population is aged under 15, while 65.2% is aged 15–64 and 10.1% is aged 65 or over. The median age of the world's population is estimated to be 31 years in 2020, and is expected to rise to 37.9 years by 2050.

According to the World Health Organization, the global average life expectancy is 73.3 years as of 2020, with women living an average of 75.9 years and men approximately 70.8 years. In 2010, the global fertility rate was estimated at 2.44 children per woman. In June 2012, British researchers calculated the total weight of Earth's human population as approximately 287 million tonnes (630 billion pounds), with the average person weighing around 62 kilograms (137 lb).

The IMF estimated nominal 2021 gross world product at US$94.94 trillion, giving an annual global per capita figure of around US$12,290. Around 9.3% of the world population lives in extreme poverty, subsisting on less than US$1.9 per day; around 8.9% are malnourished. 87% of the world's over-15s are considered literate. As of January 2024, there were about 5 billion global Internet users, constituting 66% of the world population.

The Han Chinese are the world's largest single ethnic group, constituting over 19% of the global population in 2011. The world's most-spoken languages (Note: This is by total speakers, not first-language or native speakers.) are English (1.132B), Mandarin Chinese (1.117B), Hindi (615M), Spanish (534M) and French (280M). More than three billion people speak an Indo-European language, which is the largest language family by number of speakers. Standard Arabic is a language with no native speakers, but the total number of speakers is estimated at 274 million people.

The largest religious categories in the world as of 2020 are estimated as follows: Christianity (31%), Islam (25%), Unaffiliated (16%) and Hinduism (15%).

== Population by region ==
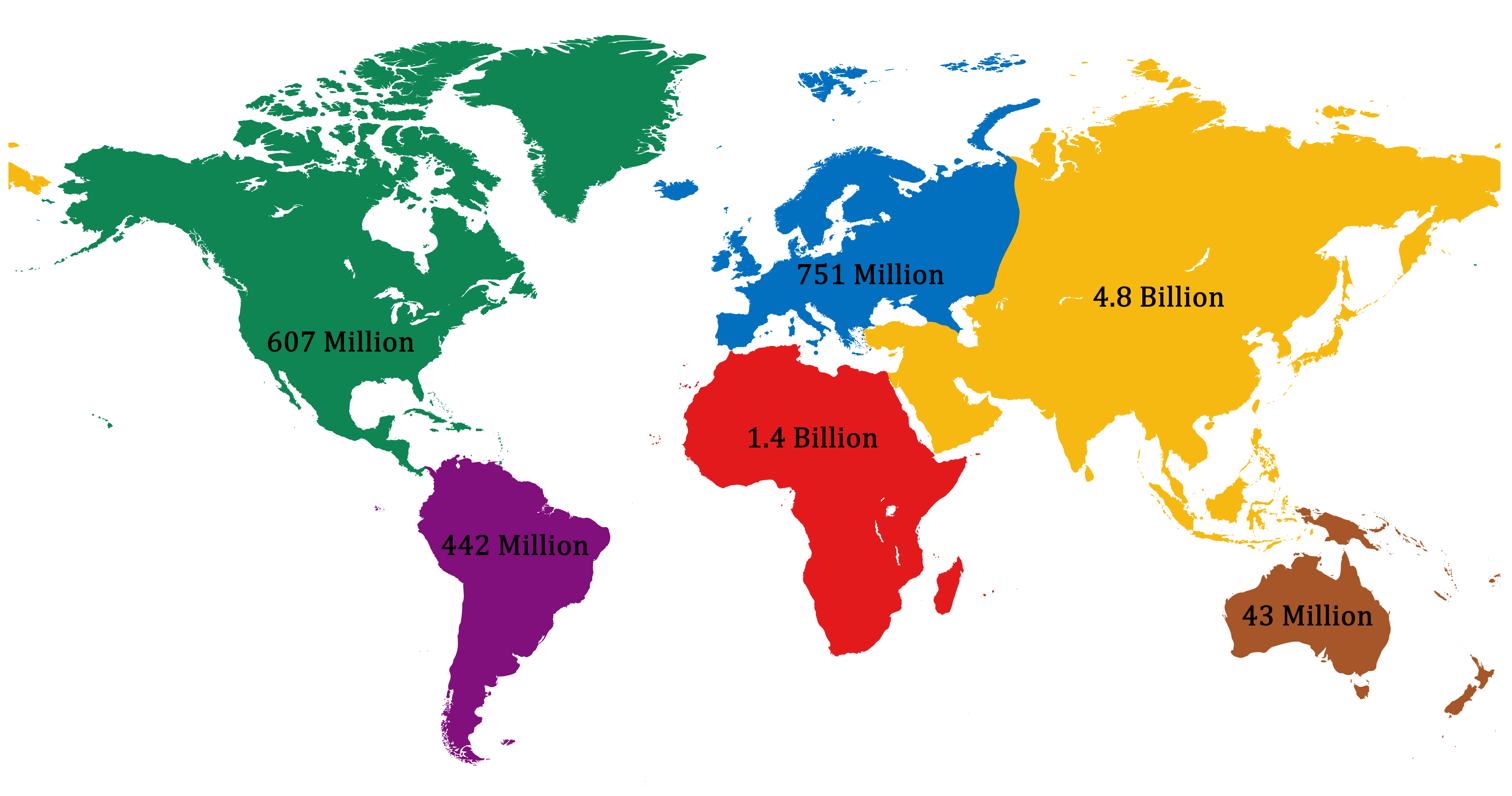
Population by continent (2022 data)

Six of the Earth's seven continents are permanently inhabited on a large scale. Asia is the most populous continent, with its 4.64 billion inhabitants accounting for 60% of the world population. The world's two most populated countries, India and China, together constitute about 36% of the world's population. Africa is the second most populated continent, with around 1.34 billion people, or 17% of the world's population. Europe's 747 million people make up 10% of the world's population as of 2020, while the Latin American and Caribbean regions are home to around 653 million (8%). Northern America, primarily consisting of the United States and Canada, has a population of around 368 million (5%), and Oceania, the least populated region, has about 42 million inhabitants (0.5%). Antarctica only has a very small, fluctuating population of about 1200 people based mainly in polar science stations.

Population pyramid of the world in continental groupings in 2023. The left and right sides of the vertical axis represent different sexes (male and female).

Current world population and latest projection according to the UN. Population in (millions) and percent of the global population in that year.
Region	2022 (percent)	2030 (percent)	2050 (percent)
Sub-Saharan Africa	1,152 (14.51%)	1,401 (16.46%)	2,094 (21.62%)
Northern Africa and Western Asia	549 (6.91%)	617 (7.25%)	771 (7.96%)
Central Asia and Southern Asia	2,075 (26.13%)	2,248 (26.41%)	2,575 (26.58%)
Eastern Asia and Southeastern Asia	2,342 (29.49%)	2,372 (27.87%)	2,317 (23.92%)
Europe and Northern America	1,120 (14.10%)	1,129 (13.26%)	1,125 (11.61%)
Latin America and the Caribbean	658 (8.29%)	695 (8.17%)	749 (7.73%)
Australia and New Zealand	31 (0.39%)	34 (0.40%)	38 (0.39%)
Oceania	14 (0.18%)	15 (0.18%)	20 (0.21%)
World	7,942	8,512	9,687

Population by region (2020 estimates)
Region	Density (inhabitants/km^{2})	Population (millions)	Most populous country	Most populous city (metropolitan area)
Asia	104.1	4,641	1,439,090,595 – India	13,515,000 – (Japan) Tokyo Metropolis (37,400,000 – (Japan) Greater Tokyo Area)
Africa	44.4	1,340	211,401,000 – Nigeria	9,500,000 – (Egypt) Cairo (20,076,000 – (Egypt) Greater Cairo)
Europe	73.4	747	146,171,000 – Russia, approx. 110 million in Europe	13,200,000 – (Russia) Moscow (20,004,000 – (Russia) Moscow metropolitan area)
Latin America	24.1	653	214,103,000 – Brazil	12,252,000 – (Brazil) São Paulo City (21,650,000 – (Brazil) São Paulo Metro Area)
Northern America (Note: Excludes Mexico, Central America and the Caribbean, which are included here under Latin America.)	14.9	368	332,909,000 – United States	8,804,000 – (United States) New York City (23,582,649 – (United States) New York metropolitan area)
Oceania	5	42	25,917,000 – Australia	5,367,000 – (Australia) Sydney
Antarctica	~0	0.004	N/A (Note: The Antarctic Treaty System limits the nature of national claims in Antarctica. Of the territorial claims in Antarctica, the Ross Dependency has the largest population.)	1,258 – (Antarctica) McMurdo Station

== Largest populations by country ==
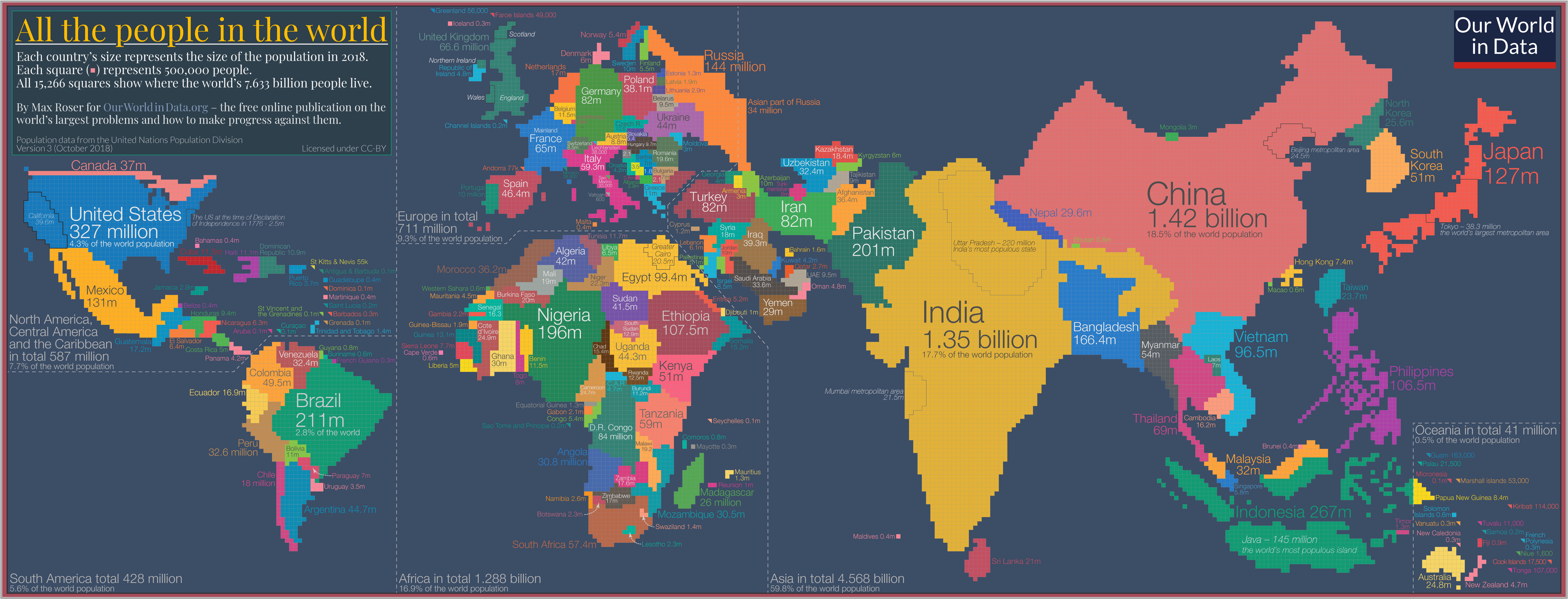
Cartogram showing the distribution of the world population; each square represents half a million people.

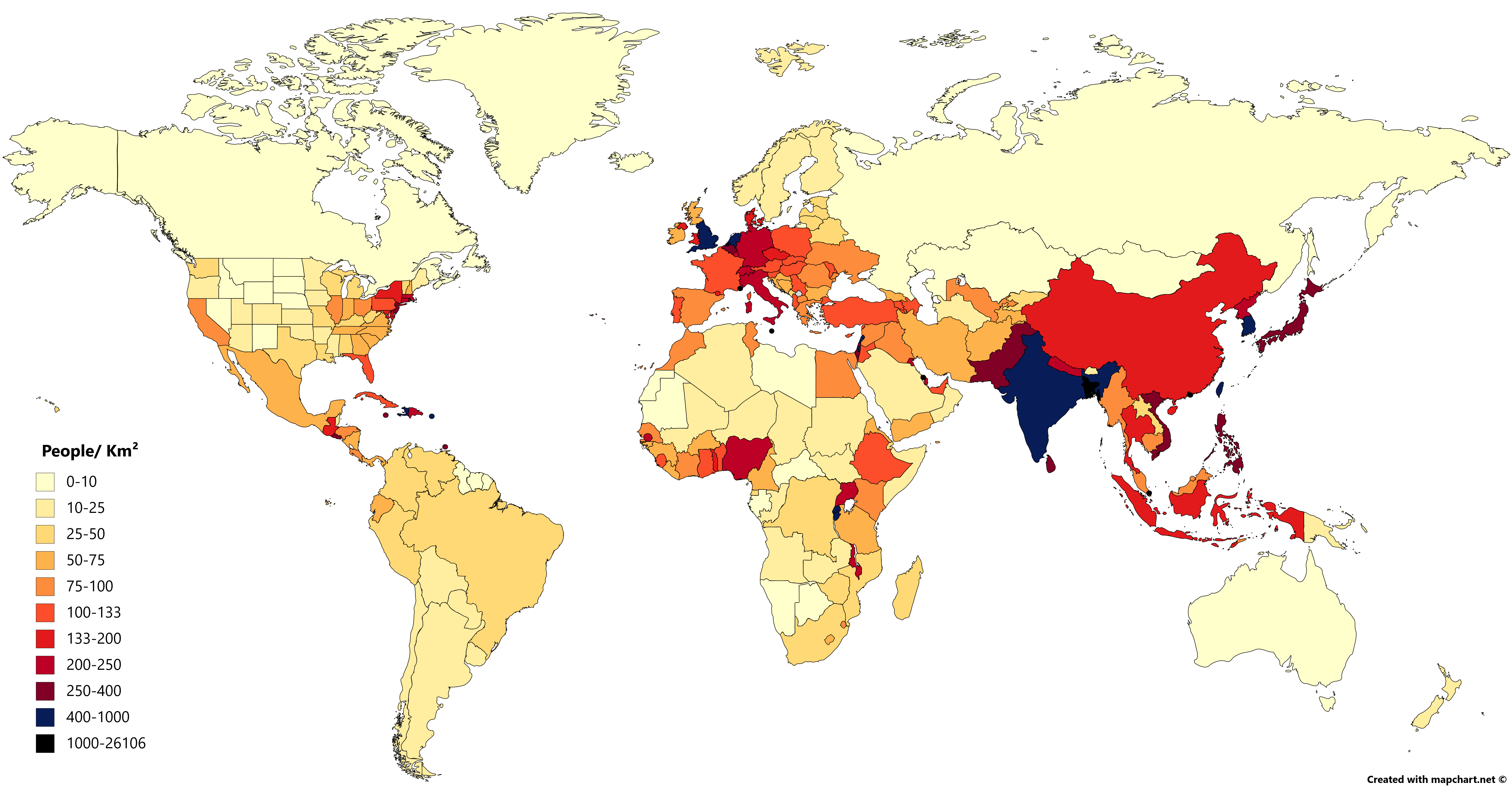
Choropleth showing Population density (people per square kilometre) by country or U.S. state in 2019

1901 to 2021 population graph of the five countries with the highest current populations

=== Ten most populous countries ===
Country / Dependency	Population	% of world	Date	Source (official or from the United Nations)
India	1,425,775,850	17.2%	14 Apr 2023	UN projection
China	1,409,670,000	17.0%	17 Jan 2024	National annual estimate
United States	339,954,442	4.11%	27 Oct 2026	National population clock
Indonesia	278,696,200	3.37%	1 Jul 2023	National annual estimate
Pakistan	229,488,994	2.77%	1 Jul 2022	UN projection
Brazil	221,363,855	2.67%	27 Oct 2026	National population clock
Nigeria	216,746,934	2.62%	1 Jul 2022	UN projection
Bangladesh	168,220,000	2.03%	1 Jul 2020	Annual Population Estimate
Russia	147,190,000	1.78%	1 Oct 2021	2021 preliminary census results
Mexico	128,271,248	1.55%	31 Mar 2022	

Approximately 4.6 billion people live in these ten countries, representing around 57% of the world's population as of July 2023.

World population (millions, UN estimates)
#	Most populous countries	2000	2015	2030 (Note: 2030 = Medium variant.)	raw data
1	China (Note: China excludes Hong Kong and Macau.)	1,270	1,376	1,416	raw data
2	India	1,053	1,311	1,528	raw data
3	United States	283	322	356	raw data
4	Indonesia	212	258	295	raw data
5	Pakistan	136	208	245	raw data
6	Brazil	176	206	228	raw data
7	Nigeria	123	182	263	raw data
8	Bangladesh	131	161	186	raw data
9	Russia	146	146	149	raw data
10	Mexico	103	127	148	raw data
	World total	6,127	7,349	8,501	raw data

=== Most densely populated countries ===
The tables below list the world's most densely populated countries, both in absolute terms and in comparison to their total populations, as of November 2022. All areas and populations are from The World Factbook, unless otherwise noted.

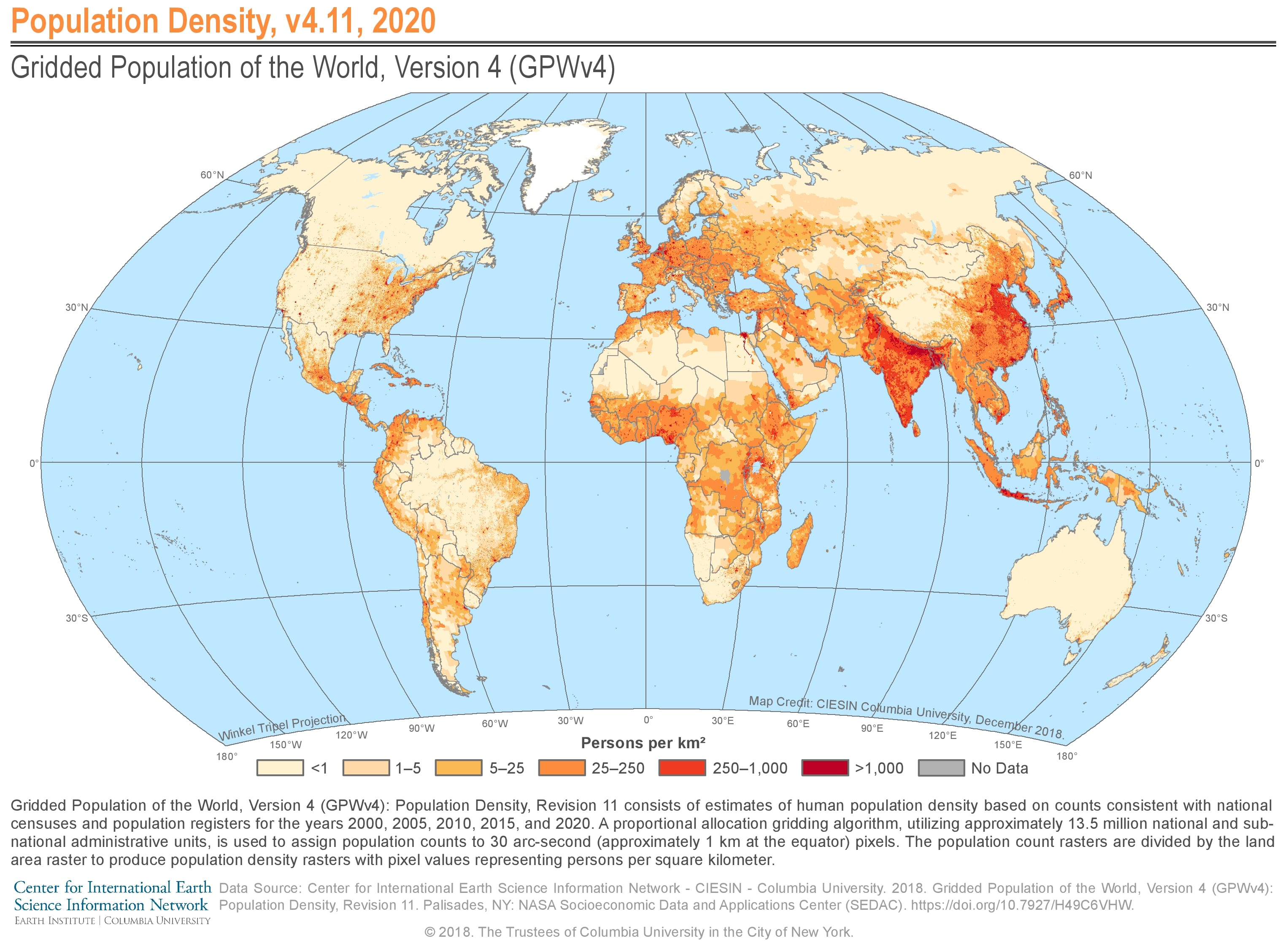
Population density (people per km^{2}) map of the world in 2020. Red areas denote regions of highest population density.

10 most densely populated countries (with population above 5 million)
Rank	Country	Population	Area (km^{2})	Density (pop/km^{2})
1	Singapore	5,921,231	719	8,235
2	Bangladesh	165,650,475	148,460	1,116
3	Palestine (Note: Has limited international recognition as a country. Area for the purposes of these calculations is that claimed, not controlled, by the State of Palestine.)	5,223,000	6,025	867
4	Taiwan (Note: Has limited international recognition as a country. Area for the purposes of these calculations is that controlled, not claimed, by Taiwan.)	23,580,712	35,980	655
5	South Korea	51,844,834	99,720	520
6	Lebanon	5,296,814	10,400	509
7	Rwanda	13,173,730	26,338	500
8	Burundi	12,696,478	27,830	456
9	Israel	9,402,617	21,937	429
10	India	1,389,637,446	3,287,263	423

Countries ranking highly in both total population (more than 20 million people) and population density (more than 250 people per square kilometer)
Rank	Country	Population	Area (km^{2})	Density (pop/km^{2})	Population trend
1	India	1,389,637,446	3,287,263	423	Growing
2	Pakistan	242,923,845	796,095	305	Rapidly growing
3	Bangladesh	165,650,475	148,460	1,116	Growing
4	Japan	124,214,766	377,915	329	Declining
5	Philippines	114,597,229	300,000	382	Growing
6	Vietnam	103,808,319	331,210	313	Growing
7	United Kingdom	67,791,400	243,610	278	Growing
8	South Korea	51,844,834	99,720	520	Declining
9	Taiwan	23,580,712	35,980	655	Declining
10	Sri Lanka	23,187,516	65,610	353	Growing

== Fluctuation ==
Estimates of population evolution in different continents between 1950 and 2050, according to the United Nations. The vertical axis is logarithmic and is in millions of people.

Population size fluctuates at differing rates in differing regions. Nonetheless, population growth has been the long-standing trend on all inhabited continents, as well as in most individual states. During the 20th century, the global population saw its greatest increase in known history, rising from about 1.6 billion in 1900 to over 6 billion in 2000 as the whole world entered the early phases of what has come to be called the "demographic transition". Some of the key factors contributing to this increase included the lessening of the mortality rate in many countries by improved sanitation and medical advances, and a massive increase in agricultural productivity attributed to the Green Revolution. By 2000, there were approximately ten times as many people on Earth as there had been in 1700.

However, this rapid growth did not last. During the period 2000–2005, the United Nations estimates that the world's population was growing at an annual rate of 1.3% (equivalent to around 80 million people), down from a peak of 2.1% during the period 1965–1970. Globally, although the population growth rate has been steadily declining from its peak in 1968, growth still remains high in Sub-Saharan Africa.

Map of countries by total fertility rate (2022–2023), referring to the average number of children that are born to a woman over her lifetime, according to the Population Reference Bureau

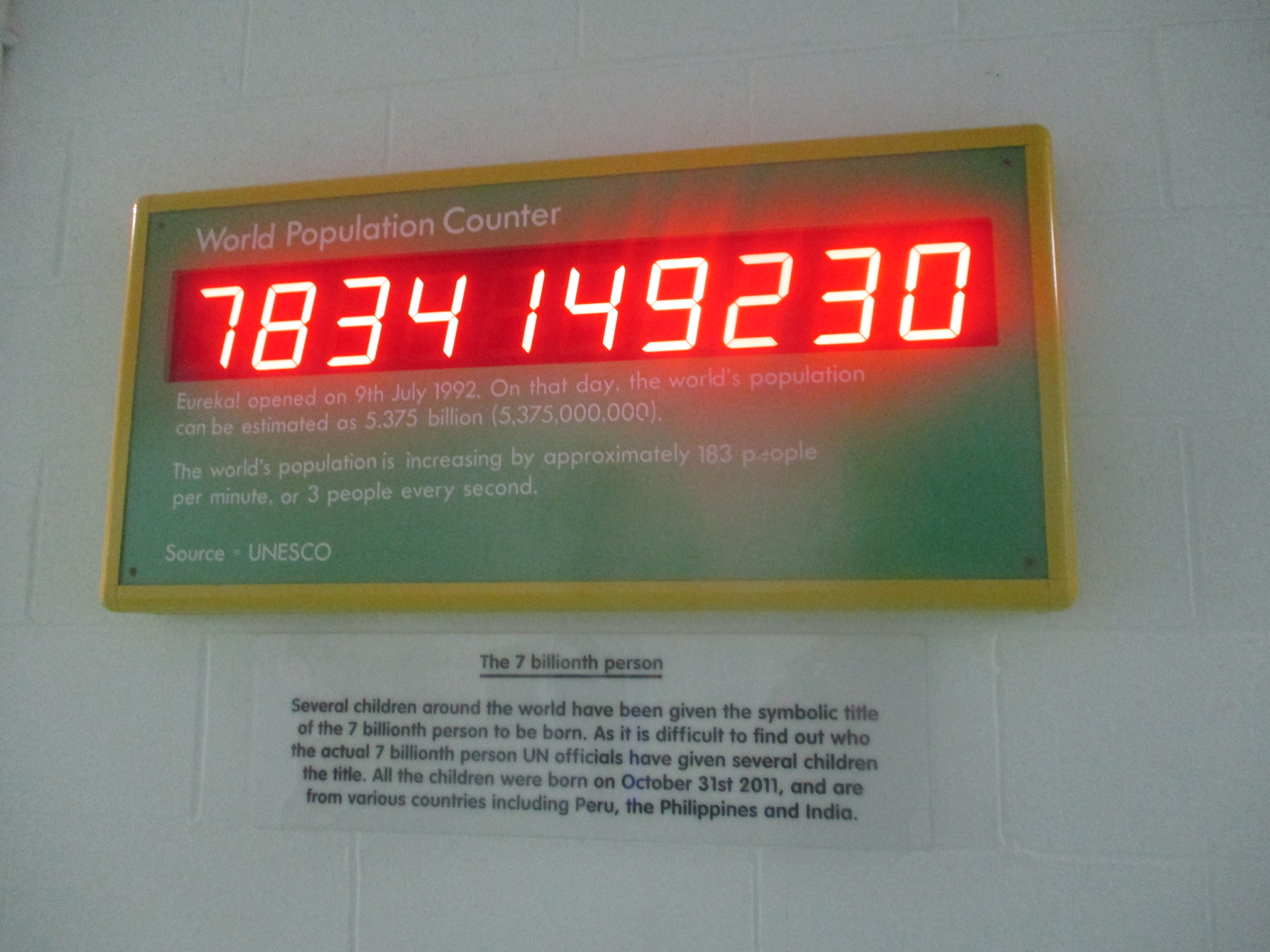
A world population clock in August 2022 at the Eureka! Museum in Halifax, West Yorkshire, England

In fact, during the 2010s, Japan and some countries in Europe began to reduce in population, due to sub-replacement fertility rates.

In 2019, the United Nations reported that the rate of population growth continues to decline due to the ongoing global demographic transition. If this trend continues, the rate of growth may diminish to zero by 2100, concurrent with a world population plateau of 10.9 billion. However, this is only one of many estimates published by the UN; in 2009, UN population projections for 2050 ranged between around 8 billion and 10.5 billion. An alternative scenario is given by the statistician Jorgen Randers, who argues that traditional projections insufficiently take into account the downward impact of global urbanization on fertility. Randers' "most likely scenario" reveals a peak in the world population in the early 2040s at about 8.1 billion people, followed by decline. Adrian Raftery, a University of Washington professor of statistics and of sociology, states that "there's a 70 percent probability the world population will not stabilize this century. Population, which had sort of fallen off the world's agenda, remains a very important issue."

Estimated world population figures, 10,000 BC – AD 2000

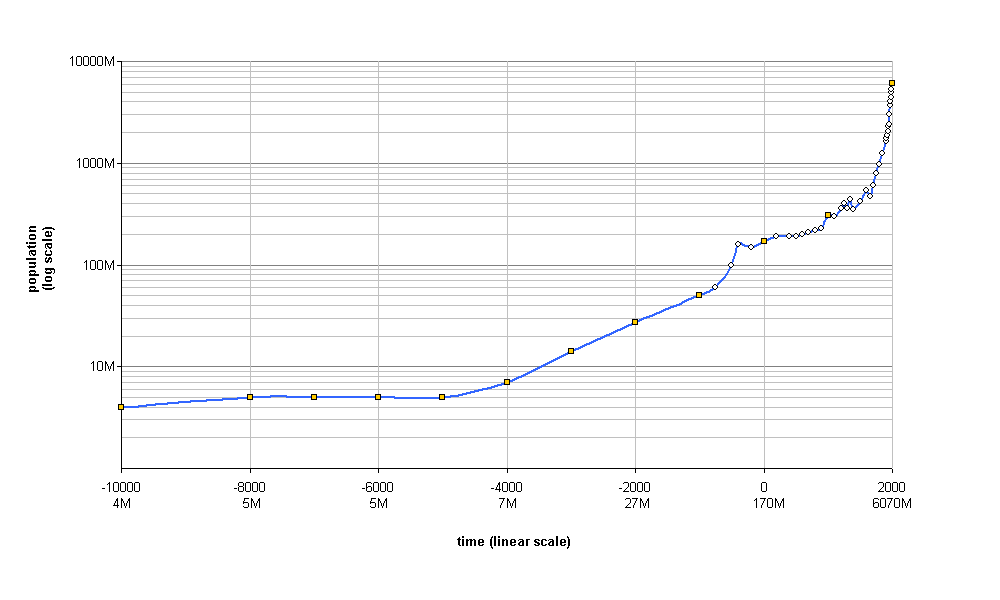
Estimated world population figures, 10,000 BC – AD 2000 (in log y scale)

World population figures, 1950–2017

=== Annual population growth ===
Global annual population growth
Year	Population	Yearly growth		Density (pop/km^{2})
Year	Population	%	Number	Density (pop/km^{2})
1951	2,543,130,380	1.75%	43,808,223	17
1952	2,590,270,899	1.85%	47,140,519	17
1953	2,640,278,797	1.93%	50,007,898	18
1954	2,691,979,339	1.96%	51,700,542	18
1955	2,746,072,141	2.01%	54,092,802	18
1956	2,801,002,631	2.00%	54,930,490	19
1957	2,857,866,857	2.03%	56,864,226	19
1958	2,916,108,097	2.04%	58,241,240	20
1959	2,970,292,188	1.86%	54,184,091	20
1960	3,019,233,434	1.65%	48,941,246	20
1961	3,068,370,609	1.63%	49,137,175	21
1962	3,126,686,743	1.90%	58,316,134	21
1963	3,195,779,247	2.21%	69,092,504	21
1964	3,267,212,338	2.24%	71,433,091	22
1965	3,337,111,983	2.14%	69,899,645	22
1966	3,406,417,036	2.08%	69,305,053	23
1967	3,475,448,166	2.03%	69,031,130	23
1968	3,546,810,808	2.05%	71,362,642	24
1969	3,620,655,275	2.08%	73,844,467	24
1970	3,695,390,336	2.06%	74,735,061	25
1971	3,770,163,092	2.02%	74,772,756	25
1972	3,844,800,885	1.98%	74,637,793	26
1973	3,920,251,504	1.96%	75,450,619	26
1974	3,995,517,077	1.92%	75,265,573	27
1975	4,069,437,231	1.85%	73,920,154	27
1976	4,142,505,882	1.80%	73,068,651	28
1977	4,215,772,490	1.77%	73,266,608	28
1978	4,289,657,708	1.75%	73,885,218	29
1979	4,365,582,871	1.77%	75,925,163	29
1980	4,444,007,706	1.80%	78,424,835	30
1981	4,524,627,658	1.81%	80,619,952	30
1982	4,607,984,871	1.84%	83,357,213	31
1983	4,691,884,238	1.82%	83,899,367	32
1984	4,775,836,074	1.79%	83,951,836	32
1985	4,861,730,613	1.80%	85,894,539	33
1986	4,950,063,339	1.82%	88,332,726	33
1987	5,040,984,495	1.84%	90,921,156	34
1988	5,132,293,974	1.81%	91,309,479	34
1989	5,223,704,308	1.78%	91,410,334	35
1990	5,316,175,862	1.77%	92,471,554	36
1991	5,406,245,867	1.69%	90,070,005	36
1992	5,492,686,093	1.60%	86,440,226	37
1993	5,577,433,523	1.54%	84,747,430	37
1994	5,660,727,993	1.49%	83,294,470	38
1995	5,743,219,454	1.46%	82,491,461	39
1996	5,825,145,298	1.43%	81,925,844	39
1997	5,906,481,261	1.40%	81,335,963	40
1998	5,987,312,480	1.37%	80,831,219	40
1999	6,067,758,458	1.34%	80,445,978	41
2000	6,148,898,975	1.34%	81,140,517	41
2001	6,230,746,982	1.33%	81,848,007	42
2002	6,312,407,360	1.31%	81,660,378	42
2003	6,393,898,365	1.29%	81,491,005	43
2004	6,475,751,478	1.28%	81,853,113	43
2005	6,558,176,119	1.27%	82,424,641	44
2006	6,641,416,218	1.27%	83,240,099	45
2007	6,725,948,544	1.27%	84,532,326	45
2008	6,811,597,272	1.27%	85,648,728	46
2009	6,898,305,908	1.27%	86,708,636	46
2010	6,985,603,105	1.27%	87,297,197	47
2011	7,073,125,425	1.25%	87,522,320	47
2012	7,161,697,921	1.25%	88,572,496	48
2013	7,250,593,370	1.24%	88,895,449	49
2014	7,339,013,419	1.22%	88,420,049	49
2015	7,426,597,537	1.19%	87,584,118	50
2016	7,513,474,238	1.17%	86,876,701	50
2017	7,599,822,404	1.15%	86,348,166	51
2018	7,683,789,828	1.10%	83,967,424	52
2019	7,764,951,032	1.06%	81,161,204	52
2020	7,840,952,880	0.98%	76,001,848	53
2021	7,909,295,151	0.87%	68,342,271	53
2022	7,975,105,156	0.83%	65,810,005	54
2023	8,045,311,447	0.88%	70,206,291	54
2024	8,161,972,572	0.87%	70,237,642	55
2025	8,231,613,070	0.85%	69,640,498	55

=== Population growth by region ===
The table below shows historical and predicted regional population figures in millions. The availability of historical population figures varies by region.

World historical and predicted populations (in millions)
Region	1500	1600	1700	1750	1800	1850	1900	1950	1999	2008	2010	2012	2050	2150
World	585	660	710	791	978	1,262	1,650	2,521	6,008	6,707	6,896	7,052	9,725	9,746
Africa	86	114	106	106	107	111	133	221	783	973	1,022	1,052	2,478	2,308
Asia	282	350	411	502	635	809	947	1,402	3,700	4,054	4,164	4,250	5,267	5,561
Europe	168	170	178	190	203	276	408	547	675	732	738	740	734	517
Latin America (Note: North America is here defined to include the northernmost countries and territories of North America: Canada, the United States, Greenland, Bermuda, and Saint Pierre and Miquelon. Latin America & Carib. comprises Mexico, Central America, the Caribbean, and South America.)	40	20	10	16	24	38	74	167	508	577	590	603	784	912
Northern America	6	3	2	2	7	26	82	172	312	337	345	351	433	398
Oceania	3	3	3	2	2	2	6	13	30	34	37	38	57	51

World historical and predicted populations by percentage distribution
Region	1500	1600	1700	1750	1800	1850	1900	1950	1999	2008	2010	2012	2050	2150
Africa	14.7	17.3	14.9	13.4	10.9	8.8	8.1	8.8	13.0	14.5	14.8	15.2	25.5	23.7
Asia	48.2	53.0	57.9	63.5	64.9	64.1	57.4	55.6	61.6	60.4	60.4	60.3	54.2	57.1
Europe	28.7	25.8	25.1	20.6	20.8	21.9	24.7	21.7	11.2	10.9	10.7	10.5	7.6	5.3
Latin America	6.8	3.0	1.4	2.0	2.5	3.0	4.5	6.6	8.5	8.6	8.6	8.6	8.1	9.4
Northern America	1.0	0.5	0.3	0.3	0.7	2.1	5.0	6.8	5.2	5.0	5.0	5.0	4.5	4.1
Oceania	0.5	0.5	0.4	0.3	0.2	0.2	0.4	0.5	0.5	0.5	0.5	0.5	0.6	0.5

=== Past population ===
The following table gives estimates, in millions, of population in the past. The data for 1750 to 1900 are from the UN report "The World at Six Billion" whereas the data from 1950 to 2015 are from a UN data sheet.

Year	World	Africa	Asia	Europe	Latin America & Carib.	North America	Oceania	Notes
70,000 BC	< 0.015							
10,000 BC	4							
8000 BC	5							
6500 BC	5							
5000 BC	5							
4000 BC	7							
3000 BC	14							
2000 BC	27							
1000 BC	50	7	33	9				
500 BC	100	14	66	16				
AD 1	200	23	141	28				
1000	400	70	269	50	8	1	2	
1500	458	86	243	84	39	3	3	
1600	580	114	339	111	10	3	3	
1700	682	106	436	125	10	2	3	
1750	791	106	502	163	16	2	2	
1800	1,000	107	656	203	24	7	3	
1850	1,262	111	809	276	38	26	2	
1900	1,650	133	947	408	74	82	6	
1950	2,525	229	1,394	549	169	172	12.7	
1955	2,758	254	1,534	577	193	187	14.2	
1960	3,018	285	1,687	606	221	204	15.8	
1965	3,322	322	1,875	635	254	219	17.5	
1970	3,682	366	2,120	657	288	231	19.7	
1975	4,061	416	2,378	677	326	242	21.5	
1980	4,440	478	2,626	694	365	254	23.0	
1985	4,853	550	2,897	708	406	267	24.9	
1990	5,310	632	3,202	721	447	281	27.0	
1995	5,735	720	3,475	728	487	296	29.1	
2000	6,127	814	3,714	726	527	314	31.1	
2005	6,520	920	3,945	729	564	329	33.4	
2010	6,930	1,044	4,170	735	600	344	36.4	
2015	7,349	1,186	4,393	738	634	358	39.3	
2020	7,887	1,381	4,688	750	647	378	44.1	
2025	8,232	1,555	4,835	744	668	388	46.6	

Using the above figures, the change in population from 2010 to 2015 was:

- World: +420 million
- Africa: +142 million
- Asia: +223 million
- Europe: +3 million
- Latin America and Caribbean: +35 million
- Northern America: +14 million
- Oceania: +2.9 million

=== Projections ===
World population by age group projection until 2100

Long-term global population growth is difficult to predict. The United Nations and the US Census Bureau both give different estimates – according to the UN, the world population reached seven billion in late 2011, while the USCB asserted that this occurred in March 2012. Since 1951, the UN has issued multiple projections of future world population, based on different assumptions. From 2000 to 2005, the UN consistently revised these projections downward, until the 2006 revision, issued on 14 March 2007, revised the 2050 mid-range estimate upwards by 273 million.

Complicating the UN's and others' attempts to project future populations is the fact that average global birth rates, as well as mortality rates, are declining rapidly, as the nations of the world progress through the stages of the demographic transition, but both vary greatly between developed countries (where birth rates and mortality rates are often low) and developing countries (where birth and mortality rates typically remain high). Different ethnicities also display varying birth rates. Birth rate and mortality rates can change rapidly due to disease epidemics, wars and other mass catastrophes, or advances in medicine and public health.

World population growth 1700–2100, 2022 projection

Regional and worldwide populations after 1950. Projected population to 2100 is based on the UN's medium population scenario.

The UN's first report in 1951 showed that during the period 1950–55 the crude birth rate was 36.9/1,000 population and the crude death rate was 19.1/1,000. By the period 2015–20, both numbers had dropped significantly to 18.5/1,000 for the crude birth rate and 7.5/1,000 for the crude death rate. UN projections for 2100 show a further decline in the crude birth rate to 11.6/1,000 and an increase in the crude death rate to 11.2/1,000.

The total number of births globally is currently (2015–20) 140 million/year, is projected to peak during the period 2040–45 at 141 million/year and thereafter decline slowly to 126 million/year by 2100. The total number of deaths is currently 57 million/year and is projected to grow steadily to 121 million/year by 2100.

2012 United Nations projections show a continued increase in population in the near future with a steady decline in population growth rate; the global population is expected to reach between 8.3 and 10.9 billion by 2050. 2003 UN Population Division population projections for the year 2150 range between 3.2 and 24.8 billion. One of many independent mathematical models supports the lower estimate, while a 2014 estimate forecasts between 9.3 and 12.6 billion in 2100, and continued growth thereafter. The 2019 Revision of the UN estimates gives the "medium variant" population as; nearly 8.6 billion in 2030, about 9.7 billion in 2050 and about 10.9 billion in 2100. In December 2019, the German Foundation for World Population projected that the global population will reach 8 billion by 2023 as it increases by 156 every minute. In a modeled future projection by the Institute for Health Metrics and Evaluation, the global population was projected to peak in 2064 at 9.73 billion people and decline to 8.79 billion in 2100. Some analysts have questioned the sustainability of further world population growth, highlighting the growing pressures on the environment, global food supplies, and energy resources.

Some scholars have argued that a form of "cultural selection" may be occurring due to significant differences in fertility rates between cultures, and it can therefore be expected that fertility rates and rates of population growth may rise again in the future. An example is certain religious groups that have a higher birth rate that is not accounted for by differences in income. In his book Shall the Religious Inherit the Earth?, Eric Kaufmann argues that demographic trends point to religious fundamentalists greatly increasing as a share of the population over the next century. From the perspective of evolutionary psychology, it is expected that selection pressure should occur for whatever psychological or cultural traits maximize fertility.

UN (medium variant – 2019 revision) and US Census Bureau (June 2015) estimates
Year	UN est. (millions)	Difference	USCB est. (millions)	Difference
2005	6,542	–	6,473	–
2010	6,957	415	6,866	393
2015	7,380	423	7,256	390
2020	7,795	415	7,643	380
2025	8,184	390	8,007	363
2030	8,549	364	8,341	334
2035	8,888	339	8,646	306
2040	9,199	311	8,926	280
2045	9,482	283	9,180	254
2050	9,735	253	9,408	228

UN 2024 estimates and medium variant projections (in millions)
Year	World	Asia	Africa	Europe	Latin Am./ Caribbean	Northern America	Oceania
2000	6,144	3,741 (60.9%)	811 (13.2%)	726 (11.8%)	522 (8.5%)	312 (5.1%)	31 (0.5%)
2024	8,160	4,810 (58.9%)	1,520 (18.6%)	745 (9.1%)	663 (8.1%)	385 (4.7%)	46 (0.6%)
2050	9,660	5,280 (54.7%)	2,470 (25.6%)	703 (7.3%)	730 (7.6%)	426 (4.4%)	57 (0.6%)
2075	10,250	5,100 (49.8%)	3,290 (32.1%)	636 (6.2%)	698 (6.8%)	452 (4.4%)	66 (0.6%)
2100	10,180	4,610 (45.3%)	3,810 (37.4%)	592 (5.8%)	613 (6.0%)	475 (4.7%)	73 (0.7%)

== Mathematical approximations ==
In 1975, Sebastian von Hoerner proposed a formula for population growth which represented hyperbolic growth with an infinite population in 2025. The hyperbolic growth of the world population observed until the 1970s was later correlated to a non-linear second-order positive feedback between demographic growth and technological development. This feedback can be described as follows: technological advance → increase in the carrying capacity of land for people → demographic growth → more people → more potential inventors → acceleration of technological advance → accelerating growth of the carrying capacity → faster population growth → accelerating growth of the number of potential inventors → faster technological advance → hence, the faster growth of the Earth's carrying capacity for people, and so on. The transition from hyperbolic growth to slower rates of growth is related to the demographic transition.

According to the Russian demographer Sergey Kapitsa, the world population grew between 67,000 BC and 1965 according to the following formula:

$$N = \frac{C}{\tau} \arccot \frac{T_0 - T}{\tau},$$

where

- N is current population,
- T is the current year,
- C = (1.86 ± 0.01)·10^{11},
- T_{0} = 2007 ± 1,
- $\tau$ = 42 ± 1.

=== Years for world population to double ===
According to linear interpolation and extrapolation of UNDESA population estimates, the world population has doubled, or will double, in the years listed in the tables below (with two different starting points). During the 2nd millennium, each doubling took roughly half as long as the previous doubling, fitting the hyperbolic growth model mentioned above. However, after 2024, it is unlikely that there will be another doubling of the global population in the 21st century.

Historic chart showing the periods of time the world population has taken to double, from 1700 to 2000

Starting at 500 million
Population (in billions)	0.5	1	2	4	8		16
Year	1500	1804	1927	1974	2022		—
Years elapsed	—	304	123	47	48	—	—

Starting at 375 million
Population (in billions)	0.375	0.75	1.5	3	6		12
Year	1171	1715	1881	1960	1999		c. 2100
Years elapsed	—	544	166	79	39	c. 100+	—

== Number of humans who have ever lived ==
The total number of humans who have ever lived is estimated to be approximately 100 billion. Such estimates can only be rough approximations, as even modern population estimates are subject to uncertainty of around 3% to 5%. Kapitsa (1996) cites estimates ranging between 80 and 150 billion. The PRB puts the figure at 117 billion as of 2020, estimating that the current world population is 6.7% of all the humans who have lived since 190,000 BCE. Haub (1995) prepared another figure, updated in 2002 and 2011; the 2011 figure was approximately 107 billion. Haub characterized this figure as an estimate that required "selecting population sizes for different points from antiquity to the present and applying assumed birth rates to each period".

Robust population data only exist for the last two or three centuries. Until the late 18th century, few governments had ever performed an accurate census. In many early attempts, such as in Ancient Egypt and the Persian Empire, the focus was on counting merely a subset of the population for purposes of taxation or military service. Thus, there is a significant margin of error when estimating ancient global populations.

Pre-modern infant mortality rates are another critical factor for such an estimate; these rates are very difficult to estimate for ancient times due to a lack of accurate records. Haub (1995) estimates that around 40% of those who have ever lived did not survive beyond their first birthday. Haub also stated that "life expectancy at birth probably averaged only about ten years for most of human history", which is not to be mistaken for the life expectancy after reaching adulthood. The latter equally depended on period, location and social standing, but calculations identify averages from roughly 30 years upward.

The National Institute of Corrections estimates that the number of people who have ever lived will rise to 121 billion by 2050, 4 billion more than their 2021 estimate.

== Human population as a function of food availability ==
Individuals from a wide range of academic fields and political backgrounds have proposed that, like all other animal populations, any human population (and, by extension, the world population) predictably grows and shrinks according to available food supply, growing during an abundance of food and shrinking in times of scarcity. This idea may run counter to the popular thinking that, as population grows, food supply must also be increased to support the growing population; instead, the claim here is that growing population is the result of a growing food supply. Notable proponents of this notion include: agronomist and insect ecologist David Pimentel, behavioral scientist Russell Hopfenberg (the former two publishing a study on the topic in 2001), anthropologist and activist Virginia Abernethy, ecologist Garrett Hardin, science writer and anthropologist Peter Farb, journalist Richard Manning, environmental biologist Alan D. Thornhill, cultural critic and writer Daniel Quinn, and anarcho-primitivist John Zerzan.

Scientists generally acknowledge that at least one significant factor contributing to population growth (or overpopulation) is that as agriculture advances in creating more food, the population consequently increases—the Neolithic Revolution and Green Revolution often specifically provided as examples of such agricultural breakthroughs. Furthermore, certain scientific studies do lend evidence to food availability in particular being the dominant factor within a more recent timeframe. Other studies take it as a basic model from which to make broad population conjectures. The idea became taboo following the United Nations' 1994 International Conference on Population and Development, where framing human population growth as negatively impacting the natural environment became regarded as "anti-human".

Most human populations throughout history validate this theory, as does the overall current global population. Populations of hunter-gatherers fluctuate in accordance with the amount of available food. The world human population began consistently and sharply to rise, and continues to do so, after sedentary agricultural lifestyles became common due to the Neolithic Revolution and its increased food supply. This was, subsequent to the Green Revolution starting in the 1940s, followed by even more severely accelerated population growth. Often, wealthier countries send their surplus food resources to the aid of starving communities; however, some proponents of this theory argue that this seemingly beneficial strategy only results in further harm to those communities in the long run. Anthropologist Peter Farb, for example, has commented on the paradox that "intensification of production to feed an increased population leads to a still greater increase in population." Environmental writer Daniel Quinn has also focused on this phenomenon, which he calls the "food race", coining a term he felt was comparable, in terms of both escalation and potential catastrophe, to the nuclear arms race.

Criticism of this theory can come from multiple angles, for example by demonstrating that human population is not solely an effect of food availability, but that the situation is more complex. For instance, other relevant factors that can increase or limit human population include access to birth control, fresh water availability, arable land availability, energy consumed per person, heat removal, forest products, and various nonrenewable resources like fertilizers. Another criticism is that, in the modern era, birth rates are lowest in the developed nations, which also have the highest access to food. In fact, some developed countries have both a diminishing population and an abundant food supply. The United Nations projects that the population of 51 countries or areas, including Germany, Italy, Japan, and most of the states of the former Soviet Union, is expected to be lower in 2050 than in 2005. This shows that, limited to the scope of the population living within a single given political boundary, particular human populations do not always grow to match the available food supply. However, the global population as a whole still grows in accordance with the total food supply and many of these wealthier countries are major exporters of food to poorer populations, so that, according to Hopfenberg and Pimentel's 2001 research, "it is through exports from food-rich to food-poor areas... that the population growth in these food-poor areas is further fueled. Their study thus suggests that human population growth is an exacerbating feedback loop in which food availability creates a growing population, which then causes the misimpression that food production must be consequently expanded even further.

Regardless of criticisms against the theory that population is a function of food availability, the human population is, on the global scale, undeniably increasing, as is the net quantity of human food produced—a pattern that has been true for roughly 10,000 years, since the human development of agriculture. The fact that some affluent countries demonstrate negative population growth fails to discredit the theory as a whole, since the world has become a globalized system with food moving across national borders from areas of abundance to areas of scarcity. Hopfenberg and Pimentel's 2001 findings support both this and Daniel Quinn's direct accusation, in the early 2010s, that "First World farmers are fueling the Third World population explosion".

In order to meet the demands of a growing global population, agriculture needs to produce about 50% more food, feed and fibre by 2050 compared with the volumes it generated in 2012, according to estimates by the Food and Agriculture Organization of the United Nations (FAO). Achieving such objectives will place additional pressure on the world's already overstretched water, land and soil resources. In an increasing number of regions, food security and agrifood systems are at risk from unsustainable natural resource management practices, urban expansion, higher demand for food, water, energy and biomaterials, and persisting social and gender inequalities in access to and governance of resources.

== See also ==
- Demographics of the world
  - Demographic transition
  - Population ageing
- Anthropocene
- Birth control
- Coastal population growth
- Doomsday argument
- Family planning
- Food security
- Human overpopulation
- Megacity
- Natalism
- One-child policy
- Population decline
- Population dynamics
- Population growth
- Two-child policy
- Three-child policy

Lists:

- List of countries and dependencies by population
- List of countries by past and projected future population
- List of countries by population growth rate
- List of countries by population in 1900
- List of countries and dependencies by population density
- List of largest cities
- Lists of organisms by population – for non-human global populations
- List of population concern organizations
- List of religious populations
- List of countries by total fertility rate

Historical:

- Historical censuses
- Historical demography

== Sources ==
This article incorporates text from a free content work. Licensed under CC BY 4.0 (license statement/permission). Text taken from The State of the World's Land and Water Resources for Food and Agriculture 2025, Food and Agriculture Organization of the United Nations (FAO).
