= Timeline of the 21st century =

This is a timeline of the 21st century.

== 2000s ==
=== 2001 ===
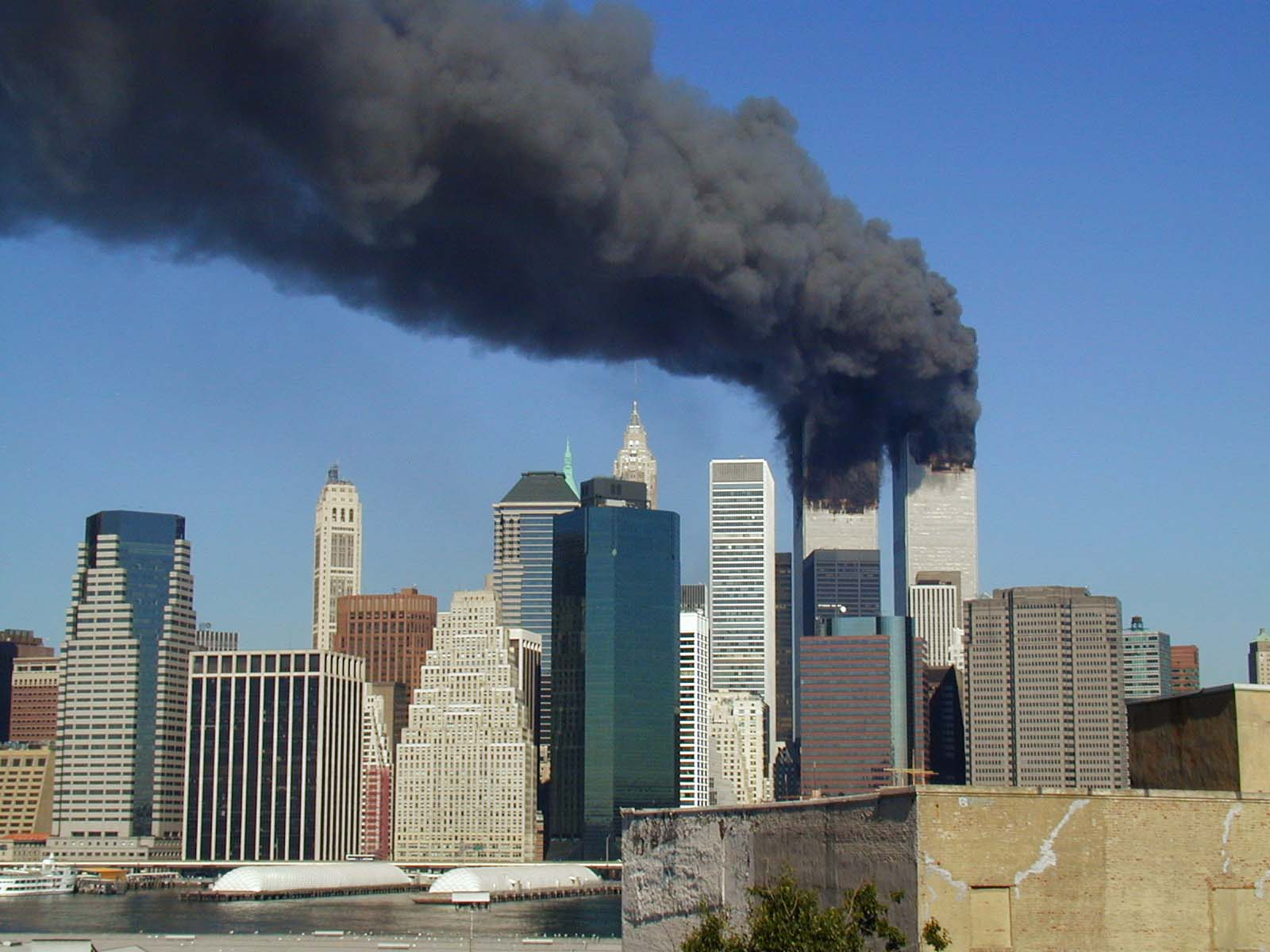
Plumes of smoke billow from the World Trade Center towers following the September 11th attacks

- January 1: Greece becomes the 12th country to join the Eurozone.
- January 7: Ghana undergoes its first peaceful transfer of power since 1979 when John Kufuor is sworn in as President of Ghana.
- January 9: Apple Inc. launches iTunes, a software program that acts as a media player and media library.
- January 15: Wikipedia is launched.
- January 16: President of the Democratic Republic of the Congo Laurent-Désiré Kabila is assassinated.
- January 17: OPEC agrees at a meeting of ministers in Vienna, to reduce members' oil production quotas by 1.5 million barrels per day.
- January 17: President Clinton honors Lewis and Clark Expedition, posthumously raises William Clark's rank from Lieutenant to Captain, makes Honorary Sergeant Shoshone female guide Sacagawea, and York, enslaved by William Clark, who assisted expedition,
- January 18: New York Rangers Mike Richter picks up his 267th career NHL win to become the winningest goaltender in team history, passing Eddie Giacomin, 2-1 in overtime against the visiting Toronto Maple Leafs,
- January 19: Mexican drug lord Joaquín "El Chapo" Guzmán escapes from a maximum-security prison near Guadalajara by bribing prison guards and hiding in a laundry cart,
- January 20: George W. Bush is inaugurated as President of the United States.
- January 20: Gloria Macapagal Arroyo is sworn-in as president of the Philippines, ending the Second EDSA Revolution.
- January 22: The 2001 insurgency in Macedonia begins.
- January 25: Armenia and Azerbaijan join the Council of Europe.
- January 26: The 7.6 Magnitude 2001 Gujarat earthquake kills over 20,000 people.
- February 12: The NEAR Shoemaker spacecraft touches down in the "saddle" region of 433 Eros, a near-Earth object, becoming the first spacecraft to land on an asteroid.
- February 12: The Human Genome Project publishes the first draft of its human genome sequence.
- February 22: The International Criminal Tribunal for the former Yugoslavia (ICTY) sentences three Bosnian Serb soldiers to prison for wartime sexual violence, recognizing it as a war crime for the first time.
- June 1: Eleven members of the royal family of Nepal, including the king and queen, are killed by Crown Prince Dipendra, who dies three days later of a self-inflicted gunshot wound.
- September 11: 2,977 people are killed in a series of coordinated terror attacks on the United States.
- September 18: Start of anthrax letter attacks.
- October 7: The United States invades Afghanistan and topples the Taliban regime, resulting in a long-term war.
- December 3: Enron files for Chapter 11 bankruptcy after a series of scandals.
- December 11: China becomes a member of the World Trade Organization.
- December 19–20: December 2001 riots in Argentina leave five presidents in less than a month.

=== 2002 ===
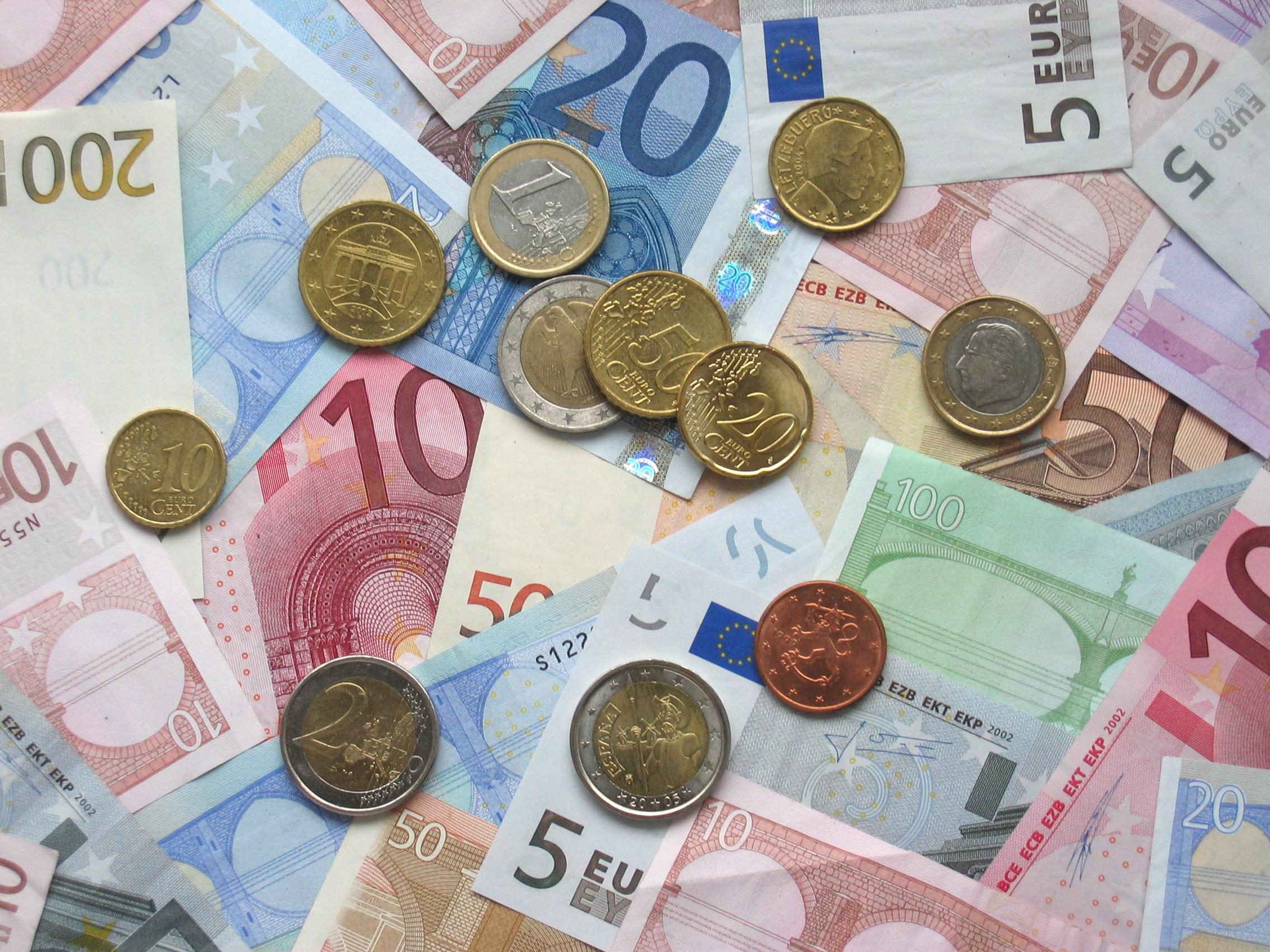
The Euro was introduced on January 1, 2002.

- January 1: The Euro enters circulation.
- January 11: The Guantanamo Bay detention camp is established.
- January 28: North Korea announces its withdrawal from the Nuclear Non-Proliferation Treaty.
- February 8: The Algerian Civil War ends.
- February 27–March 1: Riots and mass killings in the Indian state of Gujarat leave 1,044 dead.
- March 14: SpaceX is founded by Elon Musk.
- March 29: Israel starts Operation Defensive Shield in the West Bank in response to a wave of Palestinian suicide attacks.
- April 11–13: 2002 Venezuelan coup d'état attempt fails to overthrow president Hugo Chavez.
- May 20: East Timor gains independence.
- June 10: The 2001–2002 India–Pakistan standoff ends.
- July 1: The International Criminal Court is established.
- July 3: Steve Fossett becomes the first person to fly solo nonstop around the world.
- July 9: The African Union is founded.
- September 10: Switzerland joins the United Nations as the 190th member.
- September 19: The First Ivorian Civil War begins.
- October 12: The 2002 Bali bombings killed 202 people and injured 209 more.
- October 23–26: Chechen rebels seize a theater in Moscow. Amid this siege, around 200 people died.
- November 15: Hu Jintao is elected as General Secretary of the Chinese Communist Party.
- November 16: The 2002-2004 SARS outbreak begins in Guangdong, China.
- Construction of the Israeli West Bank barrier begins.

=== 2003 ===
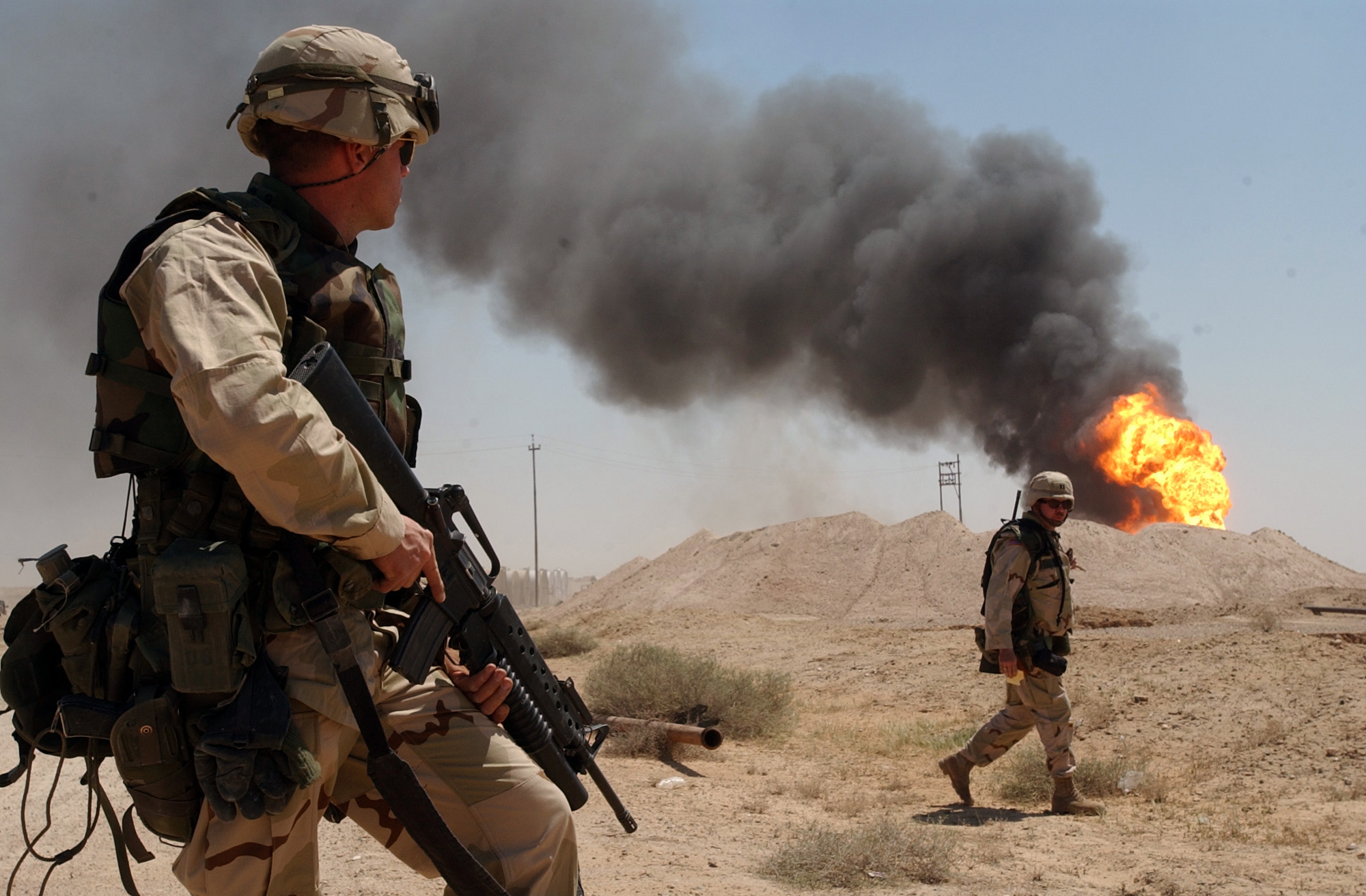
American soldiers patrol near a burning well in the Rumaylah Oil Field during the 2003 invasion of Iraq.

- February 1: Space Shuttle Columbia disintegrates upon reentry, killing all seven astronauts on board.
- February 26: The War in Darfur and Darfur genocide begin.
- March 19: The United States invades Iraq and ousts Saddam Hussein, triggering worldwide protests and an 8 year war.
- April 14: The Human Genome Project is completed.
- June 1: Belgium legalizes same-sex marriage, becoming the second country to do so after the Netherlands.
- July 18: The Second Congo War ends in a stalemate.
- July 30: The last Volkswagen Beetle is made in Mexico after 65 years in production.
- August: The Second Liberian Civil War ends.
- August 27–29: The first six-party talks, involving South and North Korea, the United States, China, Japan and Russia take place.
- October 15: China launches Shenzhou 5, its first crewed spaceflight mission with astronaut Yang Liwei.
- November 3–23: The Rose Revolution occurs in Georgia.
- November 26: Final flight of the Concorde supersonic aircraft.
- December 13: Capture of Saddam Hussein.

=== 2004 ===
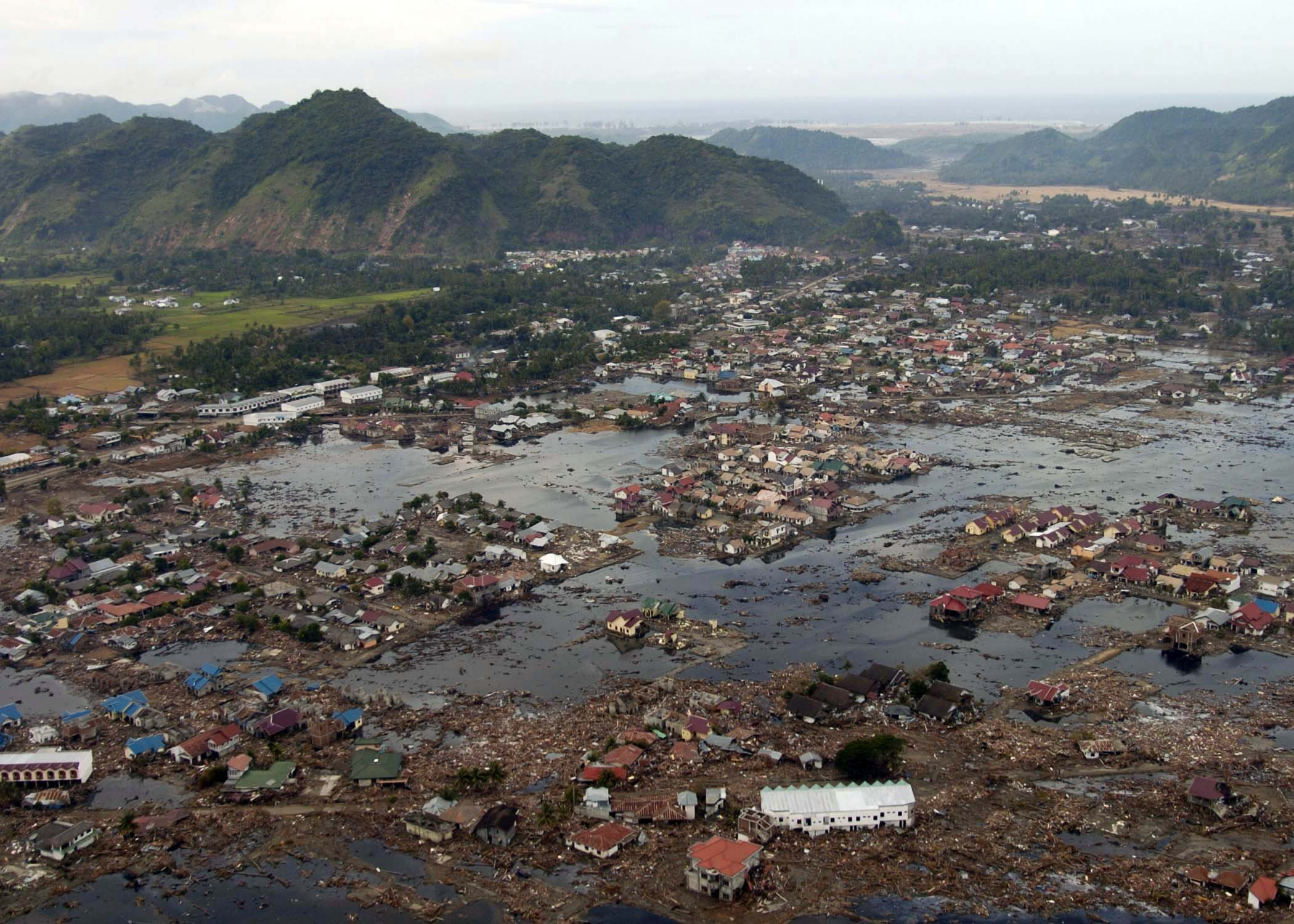
A village near the coast of Sumatra lies in ruins after the Boxing Day Tsunami.

- January 4: Spirit lands on Mars.
- January 8: The RMS Queen Mary 2, at the time the largest ocean liner ever built, is christened by its namesake's granddaughter, Queen Elizabeth II.
- January 24: Opportunity land on Mars.
- February 4: Facebook is launched on the campus of Harvard University.
- March 11: Madrid train bombings killed 193 people and injured around 2,000, Europe's deadliest attack since Pan Am Flight 103.
- March 16: War in North-West Pakistan begins.
- September 1–3: 334 people are killed in the three-day Beslan school siege.
- October 27: The Boston Red Sox win the World Series for the first time since 1918, ending the Curse of the Bambino.
- November 7–December 23: The Second Battle of Fallujah occurs. It is the deadliest American battle since the Vietnam War, killing 95 troops.
- November 18: Massachusetts becomes the first U.S. state to legalize same-sex marriage.
- November 22: The Orange Revolution in Ukraine begins.
- December 8: The Union of South American Nations formed.
- December 26: The Boxing Day Tsunami occurs in the Indian Ocean, leading to the deaths of 230,000.
- NATO and the European Union incorporates most of the former Eastern Bloc.

=== 2005 ===
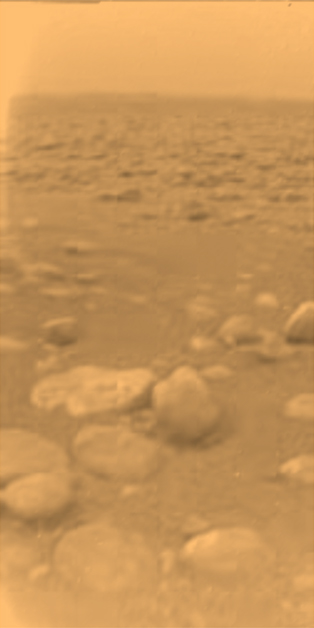
Image of the surface of Titan taken by Huygens on January 14 2005, the only image from the surface of a body permanently farther away than Mars.

- January 9: Second Sudanese Civil War ends with the signing of the Naivasha Agreement.
- January 14: The Huygens Probe lands on the surface of Saturn's moon Titan.
- February 14–April 27: Cedar Revolution in Lebanon triggered by the assassination of Rafic Hariri.
- February 16: The Kyoto Protocol comes into effect.
- March 22–April 11: Tulip Revolution in Kyrgyzstan.
- April 2–19: Pope John Paul II dies and is succeeded by Benedict XVI.
- April 23: The first video is uploaded to YouTube.
- July 7: A series of coordinated suicide attacks take place on public transport in London, which come to be known as the 7/7 attacks.
- July 28: The Provisional Irish Republican Army ends its military campaign in Northern Ireland.
- July 29: Michael E. Brown confirms the discovery of the dwarf planet Eris.
- August 3: Mahmoud Ahmadinejad becomes President of Iran.
- August 18: Peace Mission 2005, the first joint China–Russia military exercise, begins its eight-day training on the Shandong Peninsula.
- August 29–31: Hurricane Katrina kills 1,836 people across the Gulf of Mexico coast.
- September 12: Israel's withdrawal from Gaza is complete.
- September 30: Controversial drawings of Muhammad are printed in the Danish newspaper Jyllands-Posten, sparking outrage and violent riots by Muslims around the world.
- October 8: 80,000 are killed in an earthquake in Kashmir, Pakistan and Afghanistan.
- November 22: Angela Merkel becomes Germany's first female Chancellor.
- November 30: Surgeons in France carry out the first human face transplant with Isabelle Dinoire becoming the first person to undergo it.

=== 2006 ===
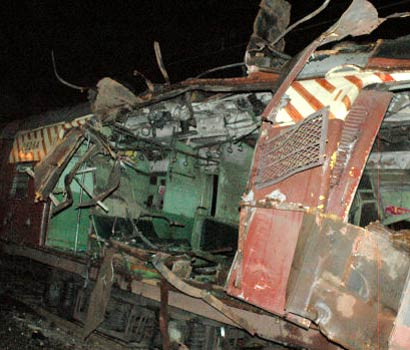
A train car damaged in the 2006 Mumbai train bombings.

- January 16: Ellen Johnson Sirleaf becomes President of Liberia, and thus Africa's first elected female head of state.
- January 25: Hamas wins the 2006 Palestinian legislative election.
- February 22: The Iraqi Civil War of 2006-2008 breaks out after sectarian violence in Iraq is escalated by the 2006 al-Askari mosque bombing.
- March 21: Twitter is launched.
- June 3: Montenegro declares independence following an earlier referendum.
- June 25: Israeli soldier Gilad Shalit is abducted by Hamas.
- July 11: Islamic terrorists carry out a series of bombings in Mumbai.
- July 12: The 2006 Lebanon War breaks out following the 2006 Hezbollah cross-border raid.
- August: The International Astronomical Union creates the first formal definition of a planet, which drops Pluto's classification as a planet.
- September 19: A coup d'état in Thailand overthrows the government of Prime Minister Thaksin Shinawatra.
- October 9: North Korea conducts a nuclear test, later estimated at a yield of 0.48 kilotons.
- October 9: Google acquires YouTube for US$1.65 billion.
- November 1: Former Russian security agent Alexander Litvinenko dies from poisoning in the UK.
- November 19: Nintendo launches the Wii.
- November 21: Comprehensive Peace Accord ends the Nepalese Civil War.
- December 11: The Mexican drug war begins with Operation Michoacán.
- December 20: Full-scale war begins in Somalia following a June 17 invasion by Ethiopia.
- December 30: Saddam Hussein is executed by hanging after being convicted of crimes against humanity.
- The Baiji, the Yangtze river dolphin, becomes functionally extinct.

=== 2007 ===
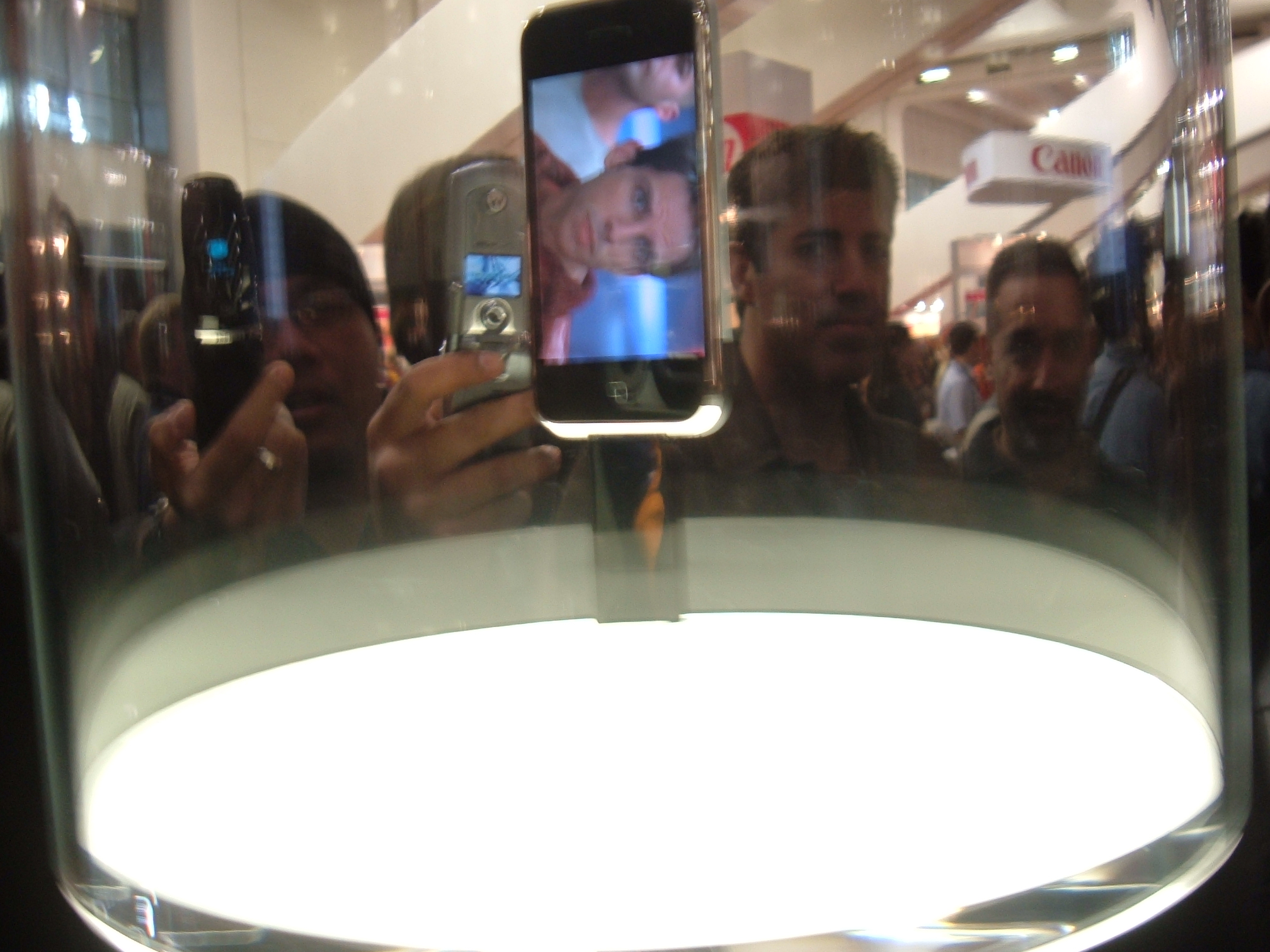
The original iPhone on display under glass at the January 2007 Macworld show

- January 1: Bulgaria and Romania join the European Union.
- January 4: Nancy Pelosi becomes the first female Speaker of the United States House of Representatives.
- January 9: Apple announces of the iPhone, which goes on sale June 29.
- March 4: The First Ivorian Civil War ends with the signing of the Ouagadougou Agreement.
- April 16: 33 people are killed in the Virginia Tech shooting.
- June 15: The Battle of Gaza (2007) ends, resulting in Hamas taking control of the Gaza strip.
- August 15: Anti-government protests in Myanmar suppressed by ruling junta.
- December 13: All 27 EU member states sign the Treaty of Lisbon, with the treaty coming into effect on December 1, 2009.
- December 27: Assassination of Benazir Bhutto, opposition leader and former prime minister of Pakistan.
- A Spike in food prices and subprime crisis help trigger global recession.
- Crisis follows the Kenyan presidential election of 2007, leading to the formation of a coalition government.

=== 2008 ===
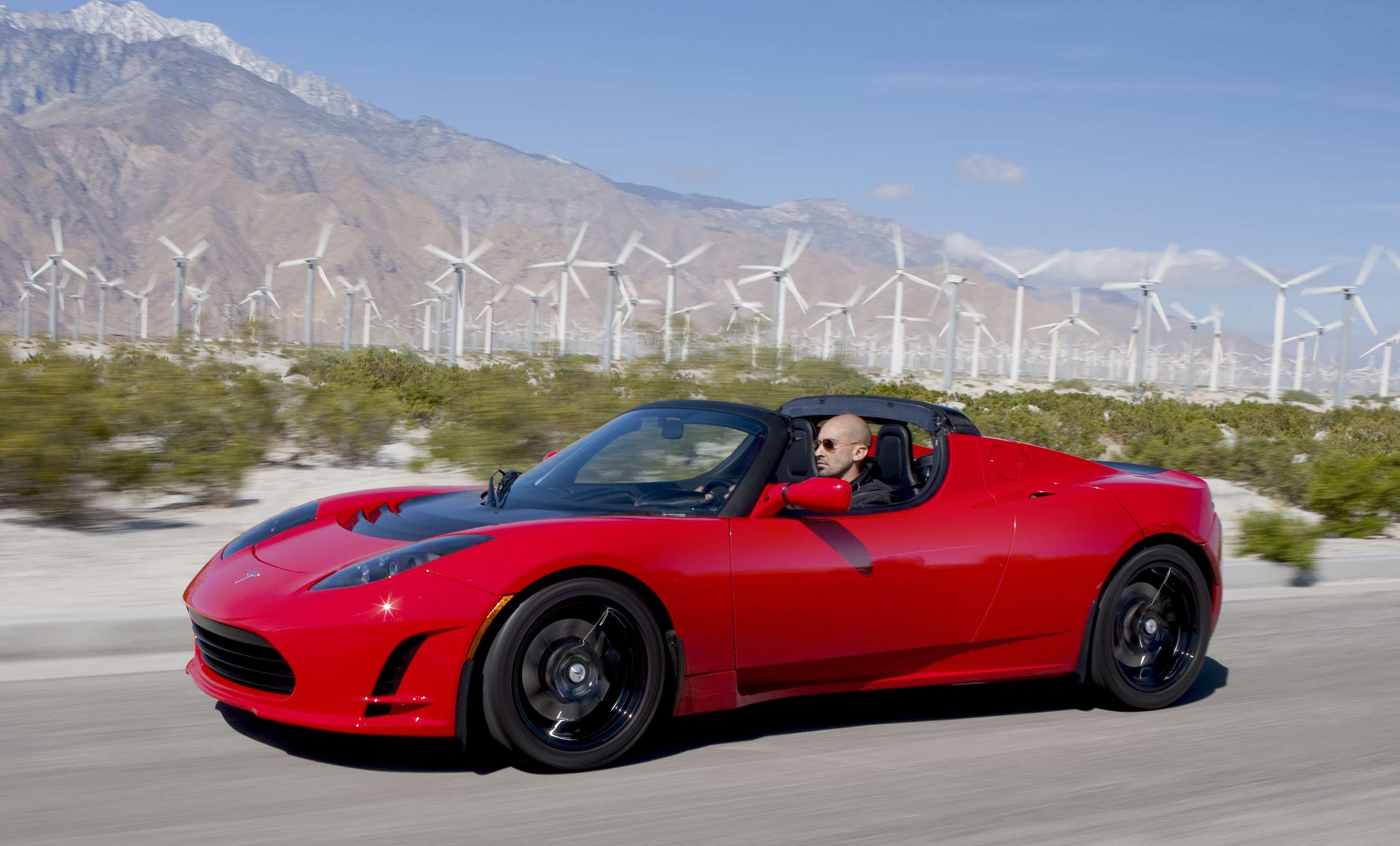
Tesla Roadster launched in 2008, the first mass production lithium-ion battery electric car.

- February: The Tesla Roadster launched, the first mass production lithium-ion battery electric car.
- February 17: Kosovo declares independence, though it is not recognised by the United Nations.
- May 2: Cyclone Nargis kills 133,000 in Myanmar.
- May 12: The 2008 Sichuan earthquake occurs in Wenchuan, China killing 87,499 people.
- May 28: The 1st Nepalese Constituent Assembly declares Nepal a republic, ending its monarchy.
- August 1–16: The Russo-Georgian War takes place, resulting in the occupation of Abkhazia and South Ossetia
- October 7: Spotify is launched.
- September 10: The Large Hadron Collider is completed as the world's largest and most powerful particle collider.
- Semtember 15: The investement bank Lehman brothers files for bankruptcy with over $600 billion in debt.
- November 4: Barack Obama is elected the first African-American President of the United States.
- November 26–29: 175 people are killed over the course of 12 coordinated attacks in Mumbai.
- December 11: Google Chrome is released.
- December 27: The Gaza War begins.
- Stock markets plunge during the 2008 financial crisis and the Great Recession.

=== 2009 ===
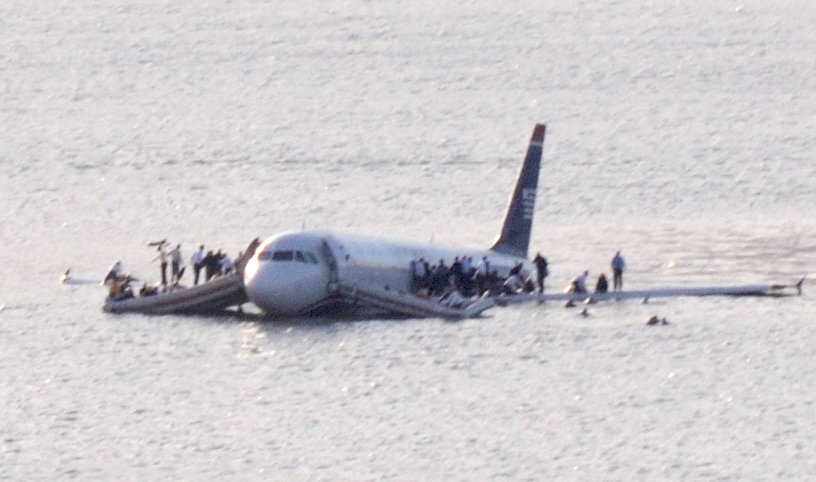
Evacuation of US Airways Flight 1549 as it floats on the Hudson River

- January 3: The cryptocurrency Bitcoin is launched.
- January 15: US Airways Flight 1549 ditches in the Hudson River in an accident that becomes known as the "Miracle on the Hudson", as all 155 people on board are rescued.
- January 18: The Gaza War ends.
- January 20: First inauguration of Barack Obama.
- May 18: The Sri Lankan Civil War ends following the death of Velupillai Prabhakaran.
- June 13: Results of the 2009 Iranian presidential election are announced leading to mass protests.
- June 16: Formation of BRICS economic bloc.
- July 26–29: The 2009 Boko Haram uprising begins the Boko Haram insurgency in Nigeria.
- November 23: 58 people are abducted and killed in the Philippine province of Maguindanao del Sur.
- December 18: Avatar is released in cinemas and becomes the highest-grossing film of all time.
- 2009 swine flu pandemic begins in North America.

== 2010s ==
=== 2010 ===
- January 12: A 7.0 magnitude earthquake in Haiti kills 230,000.
- February 18: 2010 Nigerien coup d'état.
- March 29: 2010 Moscow Metro bombings.
- April 10: The President of Poland, Lech Kaczyński, is among 96 killed when their airplane crashes in Smolensk, Russia.
- April 20: The largest oil spill in US history occurs in the Gulf of Mexico.
- March 20: Icelandic volcano Eyjafjallajökull erupts, causing large amount level of air travel disruption.
- May 10: Benigno Aquino III is elected as the 15th President of the Philippines.
- May 31: Gaza flotilla raid.
- June 24: Julia Gillard is elected first woman Prime Minister of Australia.
- July 22–August 10: 2010 Colombia–Venezuela diplomatic crisis.
- October 13: 33 miners are rescued after being trapped for 69 days in San José Mine in Copiapó, Chile.
- November 23: North Korea shells the island of Yeonpyeong.
- A military crackdown occurs in Thailand.
- The Greek government-debt crisis triggers the euro area crisis and the Post-2008 Irish economic downturn.
- Burmese political prisoner Aung San Suu Kyi is released from house arrest.
- Arab Spring starts.
- Kyrgyz Revolution of 2010.
- The Burj Khalifa in Dubai becomes the tallest structure in the world, standing at 829.8 m (2,722 ft).
- Dilma Rousseff is elected as the first female president of Brazil.
- The iPad is introduced.
- Instagram is launched.

=== 2011 ===
- February 22: Christchurch earthquake kills 185 and injures 2,000.
- March 11: A 9.1 earthquake in Japan triggers a tsunami and the meltdown of the Fukushima Nuclear Power Plant.
- May 2: Osama bin Laden is shot dead by United States Navy SEALs in Pakistan.
- July 9: Independence of South Sudan.
- July 22: 2011 Norway attacks.
- October 20: Muammar Gaddafi is captured and killed during the Battle of Sirte.
- November 18: Minecraft is released out of beta, eventually becoming the best-selling game of all time.
- World population reaches 7 billion.
- Arab Spring: revolutions in Tunisia, Egypt and Libya follow, as well as uprisings in Yemen and Bahrain, and protests in several other Arab countries.
- Syrian civil war begins.
- Second Ivorian Civil War.
- Occupy movement inspires worldwide protests.
- News International phone hacking scandal.
- Death and state funeral of Kim Jong-il.
- The Danyang–Kunshan Grand Bridge, the world's longest, opens in China.
- Second Ivorian Civil War ends with the arrest of former president Laurent Gbagbo.
- Iraq War ends.
- Bombings occur in Russia and Somalia.
- Space Shuttle program is officially ended.
- NASA launches spacecraft to visit Jupiter and Mars.

=== 2012 ===
- May 7: Vladimir Putin is elected president of Russia for the third time.
- September 11–12: 2012 Benghazi attack leads to the death of US ambassador J. Christopher Stevens.
- October 14: Skydiver Felix Baumgartner becomes the first person to break the sound barrier without a vehicle.
- October 22–November 22: Hurricane Sandy causes $70 billion in damage and kills 233 people.
- November 6: Barack Obama wins second term as President of the United States, defeating former Massachusetts Governor Mitt Romney.
- November 15: Xi Jinping is elected as General Secretary of the Chinese Communist Party.
- November 26–December 8: UN Climate Change Conference agrees to extend the Kyoto Protocol until 2020.
- The Higgs boson is discovered.
- Conflict begins in the Central African Republic.
- Israel launches Operation Pillar of Defense against the Hamas-governed Gaza Strip.
- The US rover, Curiosity, takes a selfie on Mars and finds evidence of an ancient streambed of water on the Red Planet.
- Shenouda III, Pope of the Coptic Orthodox Church of Alexandria, dies; Tawadros II succeeds him.
- Yemeni President Ali Abdullah Saleh steps down.
- Northern Mali conflict, the MNLA declares Azawad an independent state.

=== 2013 ===
- February 15: An undiscovered meteor strikes the Chelyabinsk oblast in Russia, with an airburst injuring thousands and damaging many buildings.
- February 28–March 13: Pope Benedict XVI resigns, the first Pope to do since 1415, and Pope Francis is elected, becoming the first Pope from Latin America.
- March 5: Death and state funeral of Hugo Chavez.
- April 15: The Boston Marathon bombing
- April 24: The Rana Plaza collapses in Bangladesh.
- July 1: Croatia becomes a member of the European Union.
- July 3: Egyptian president Mohamed Morsi is ousted in a coup d'état.
- July 22: Birth of Prince George of Wales.
- August 21: A chemical attack in Ghouta, Syria is blamed on President Bashar al-Assad.
- September 17: Rockstar Games release Grand Theft Auto V.
- November 8: Typhoon Haiyan kills nearly 6,150 people in Vietnam and the Philippines.
- November 21: The Euromaidan uprising begins in Ukraine.
- The French military intervenes in the Northern Mali conflict.
- Edward Snowden releases classified documents concerning mass surveillance by the NSA.
- Conflict begins in South Sudan.
- Uruguay becomes the first country to fully legalize cannabis.
- End of 2012–2013 Cypriot financial crisis.

=== 2014 ===
- February: Euromaidan protest in Ukraine sparks a revolution and the overthrow of Viktor Yanukovych, leading to Russia's annexation of Crimea and the war in Donbas.
- March 8: Malaysia Airlines Flight 370 disappears from radar while on route to Beijing from Kuala Lumpur. There were 239 people on board.
- April 16: The MV Sewol sinks, killing 304 of 476 passengers, 250 of which were students at Danwon High School.
- May 22: A coup d'état in Thailand overthrows the caretaker government.
- June 19: King Juan Carlos I of Spain abdicates; his son becomes King Felipe VI.
- August 9: The shooting of African-American teenager Michael Brown by police leads to violent unrest in Ferguson, Missouri.
- September 18: Scotland votes to remain part of the United Kingdom during the 2014 Scottish independence referendum.
- November 12: The Rosetta spacecraft's Philae probe becomes the first to successfully land on a comet.
- The worst Ebola epidemic in recorded history occurs in West Africa, infecting nearly 30,000 people and resulting in the deaths of 11,000+.
- The Yemeni Civil War begins after the Houthi takeover in Yemen.
- Persecution of Uyghurs in China in Xinjiang increases.
- Malaysia Airlines Flight 17 is shot down over Ukraine and Air Algérie Flight 5017 is downed in Mali.
- 2014 Gaza War: Israel launches an assault on the Gaza Strip in response to tit-for-tat murder-kidnappings, leading to the deaths of 71 Israelis and 2,100 Palestinians.
- ISIL begins its offensive in northern Iraq, leading to intervention in Iraq and Syria by a US-led coalition.
- Second Libyan Civil War begins.
- Narendra Modi is elected as the Prime Minister of India.

=== 2015 ===
- January 1: Five former Soviet Union countries form the Eurasian Economic Union.
- January 3–7: Boko Haram perpetrates a massacre of over 2,000 people in Baga, Nigeria, and allies itself with ISIL.
- April 2: Al-Shabaab perpetrates a mass shooting in Kenya, killing 148.
- July 14: Joint Comprehensive Plan of Action agreement reached, setting limits to Iran's nuclear program in exchange for sanctions relief.
- July 30: Smart contract based Cryptocurrencies Ethereum launched.
- September 30: Russia begins air strikes against ISIL and anti-government forces in Syria
- November 30–December 12: 195 nations agree to lower carbon emissions by negotiating the Paris agreement.
- A series of terrorist attacks occur in Paris.
- A series of earthquakes in the Himalayas kills over 10,000 people.
- The heads of China and Taiwan meet for the first time, while the United States and Cuba reestablish full diplomatic relations.
- Liquid water is found on Mars.
- First close-up images of Ceres and Pluto.
- China announces the end of One-child policy after 35 years.
- European migrant crisis.
- The Supreme Court of the United States determines that same-sex couples have a constitutional right to marry.
- Homo naledi, a species of early human, is discovered in Africa.
- Volkswagen emissions scandal.
- 2015 FIFA corruption case.

=== 2016 ===
- February 11: Detection of gravitational waves by LIGO confirmed.
- March 9–15: Artificial intelligence program AlphaGo defeats top Go player Lee Sedol in a series of 5 games, winning 4 out of 5 games.
- March 20: Barack Obama becomes the first U.S. president to visit Cuba since Calvin Coolidge in 1928.
- April 3: Panama Papers, a leak of legal documents, reveals information of 214,888 offshore companies.
- May 9: Rodrigo Duterte becomes President of the Philippines, and initiates a controversial drug war.
- June 1: The Gotthard Base Tunnel, the world's longest and deepest railway tunnel, is completed.
- June 12: A shooter kills 49 people at a gay nightclub in Orlando, Florida.
- June 23–July 13: The people of the United Kingdom vote to leave the European Union; David Cameron resigns as a result, and Theresa May succeeds him as the second female Prime Minister of the UK.
- July 4: Juno enters orbit around Jupiter
- September 4: Mother Teresa is officially canonized by Pope Francis.
- November 4: The Paris Agreement, signed by 195 nations to fight global warming, formally goes into effect.
- November 8: Donald Trump wins the 2016 United States presidential election, in an upset against Hillary Clinton, the first woman to be nominated by a major party.
- The United Nations lifts sanctions from Iran in recognition of the dismantling of its nuclear program.
- Pope Francis and Patriarch Kirill sign the Ecumenical Declaration.
- ISIL claims responsibility for a series of bombings in Brussels, a massacre at Istanbul's Atatürk Airport and car ramming attacks in Nice.
- Augmented-reality game, Pokémon Go, is released, breaking records in revenue, and becoming the best-selling mobile game.
- The Colombian government signs a peace deal with FARC to end the Colombian conflict, despite narrowly losing a referendum.
- The government of Turkey begins a series of purges in reaction to a failed coup d'état attempt.
- US troops withdraw from Afghanistan after 15 years.
- The President of Brazil, Dilma Rousseff, is impeached.
- King Bhumibol Adulyadej of Thailand dies after 70 years on the throne and is succeeded by his son Vajiralongkorn.
- Tsai Ing-wen is elected as the first female President of Taiwan.
- 2016 attack on the Saudi diplomatic missions in Iran.
- Radovan Karadžić is found guilty of 10 of 11 counts of war crimes, genocide and crimes against humanity during the Bosnian War and is sentenced to 40 years in prison.
- Dhaka attack kills 29 people.
- A third set of locks in the Panama Canal opens for commercial traffic.
- An outbreak of the Zika virus is linked to a cluster of cases of microcephaly.
- Death and state funeral of Fidel Castro.

=== 2017 ===
- January 20: Donald Trump is inaugurated as President of the United States.
- January 21: Millions of people participate in the Women's March in response to the inauguration of Donald Trump.
- February 13: Kim Jong-nam, the half-brother of Kim Jong-Un, is assassinated in Kuala Lumpur, Malaysia.
- May 13: Pope Francis canonizes Jacinta and Francisco Marto, two of the three Fátima children who reported seeing the Virgin Mary in the spring and summer of 1917.
- May 22: A terrorist bombing attack at an Ariana Grande concert in Manchester, England kills 22 people and injures over 140.
- August 11–12: Charlottesville, Virginia becomes the site of a far-right rally protesting the removal of Confederate statues throughout the US. During the event, a white supremacist rams his car into a crowd of counter-protesters, injuring 19 and killing one.
- September: Two earthquakes strike Mexico on September 8 and September 19, killing over 400 people.
- October 1: 60 people are killed in a mass shooting at a music festival in Las Vegas.
- October 14: A bombing in Mogadishu, Somalia kills 587 people and injures 316. It is one of the deadliest terrorist attacks in modern history.
- October 28: 'Oumuamua, the first known interstellar object, is identified.
- November 5: 26 people are killed in a church shooting in Sutherland Springs, Texas.
- North Korea tests a hydrogen bomb and conducts a series of ballistic missile tests. The United States responds with a wave of export sanctions.
- ISIL launches simultaneous attacks in Tehran, destroy the Great Mosque of al-Nuri in Mosul, Iraq, and kill 311 in Egypt, but is declared defeated in Iraq by the end of the year.
- A military operation targeting Rohingya Muslims in Myanmar is declared ethnic cleansing by the UNHCR.
- This year's Atlantic Hurricane season features Hurricane Harvey, which kills 107 and becomes the costliest hurricane in US history, as well as Hurricane Irma, killing 134, and Hurricane Maria, killing 3,059.
- Robert Mugabe is ousted in a coup d'état.
- Serb military commander Ratko Mladić is declared guilty of genocide in the Bosnian Genocide.
- Allegations of sexual abuse against film producer Harvey Weinstein lead to a wave of similar accusations from within Hollywood and other areas of primarily the English-speaking world.
- Grenfell Tower fire in London kills 72 and injures 70.
- The President of South Korea, Park Geun-hye, is impeached, while Moon Jae-in is elected president.
- Emmanuel Macron becomes President of France after defeating far-right candidate Marine Le Pen.

=== 2018 ===
- March 24: March for Our Lives occurs in 900 locations worldwide in response to the 14 February Parkland shooting.
- April 21: Nabi Tajima, the then oldest living person and last known person born in the 19th century dies aged 117 years, 260 days.
- June 12: The first summit between the US and North Korea and the first ever crossing of the Korean Demilitarized Zone by a North Korean leader occur.
- June 23–July 10: Twelve boys and their football coach are successfully rescued from the flooded Tham Luang Nang Non cave in Thailand.
- June 24: Saudi Arabia allows women to drive.
- October 2: Exiled Washington Post journalist Jamal Khashoggi is assassinated inside the Saudi consulate in Istanbul, triggering a diplomatic crisis for Saudi Arabia.
- Turkey invades northern Syria, while 70 die in a chemical attack, triggering a missile strike against President Bashar al-Assad’s regime.
- Pakatan Harapan becomes the first opposition party to assume power in Malaysia since independence.
- Twenty-year Eritrean–Ethiopian border conflict formally ends.
- Yellow vests movement becomes France's largest sustained period of civil unrest since 1968.
- The Sunda strait tsunami kills 426 and injures 14,000 and the 2018 Sulawesi earthquake and tsunami kills 4,340 and injures 10,700.
- Macedonia and Greece reach a historic agreement in the Macedonia naming dispute, in which the former is renamed in 2019 to the 'Republic of North Macedonia'.
- China's National People's Congress votes to abolish presidential term limits, allowing Xi Jinping to rule for life. Xi is also the General Secretary of the Chinese Communist Party, the highest position without term limits.
- China–United States trade war begins.
- 2018 Armenian revolution occurs.
- First post-ISIL election in Iraq.
- The Trump administration reimposes sanctions against Iran.
- The first monkeys are cloned, and first genetically modified humans reported, in China.
- Four people are poisoned with a nerve agent, one fatally, in Salisbury and Amesbury, England in a suspected Russian assassination attempt.
- The northern white rhinoceros becomes functionally extinct.

=== 2019 ===
- January 3: Chang'e 4 becomes the first object to land on the far side of the Moon.
- April 10: The Event Horizon Telescope takes the first ever image of a black hole, at the core of galaxy Messier 87.
- April 15: A major fire engulfs Notre-Dame Cathedral in Paris, resulting in the roof and main spire collapsing.
- April 30: Emperor Akihito of Japan abdicates from his throne, the first abdication by a Japanese monarch in almost two centuries. The abdication ends the Heisei era of Japan and ushers in the Reiwa era with the new emperor, his son Naruhito, ascending the throne on May 1.
- August 5: India revokes the special status of Jammu and Kashmir.
- October 18: NASA astronauts Jessica Meir and Christina Koch conduct the first all-female spacewalk outside of the ISS.
- December 18: US President Donald Trump is impeached by the House of Representatives for abuse of power and obstruction of Congress.
- December 20: The United States Space Force is announced by Vice President Mike Pence.
- New Horizons takes the first close up image of a classical kuiper belt object.
- Christchurch mosque shootings kill 51 people, while a suicide bombing in Iran kills 41, and a series of bomb attacks in Sri Lanka kills 250.
- ISIL loses the last of its territory.
- Abdelaziz Bouteflika resigns as President of Algeria, while Omar al-Bashir is deposed as President of Sudan in a coup d'état amid widespread protests in both countries.
- Victor Vescovo breaks the human depth record, reaching 10,928 m in the Challenger Deep.
- Protests begin in Hong Kong over an extradition bill.
- Wildfires spike in Brazil, while Australia endures the most widespread bush fires in its history.
- Isabelle Holdaway is the first patient to receive a genetically modified phage therapy to treat a drug-resistant infection.
- Pope Francis abolishes pontifical secrecy in sex abuse cases.
- The 2019–2020 dengue fever epidemic begins in Southeast Asia.
- Protests erupt in Bolivia and Venezuela over disputed elections.
- Nursultan Nazarbayev resigns as President of Kazakhstan. Kassym-Jomart Tokayev assumes power. Astana is renamed Nur-Sultan in his honor.
- The EU Directive on Copyright in the Digital Single Market is passed over intense opposition.
- Bashar al Assad launches multiple offensives in Northwestern Syria; Turkey launches an offensive into northeastern Syria.
- The United States blames attacks on ships in the Gulf of Oman on Iran, escalating tensions in the Persian Gulf.
- Barisha raid ends in the death of Abu Bakr al-Baghdadi.
- A trilateral gathering is held at the Panmunjom Truce Village between South Korean President Moon Jae-in, North Korean Leader Kim Jong-un and US President Donald Trump.
- Japan and South Korea trade dispute.
- Israeli Prime Minister Benjamin Netanyahu is indicted on charges of bribery, fraud and breach of trust.

== 2020s ==
=== 2020 ===
- January 2: The Royal Australian Air Force and Navy are deployed to New South Wales and Victoria to assist mass evacuation efforts amidst the 2019–20 Australian bushfire season.
- January 3: Qasem Soleimani is targeted and killed at Baghdad International Airport.
- January 16–February 5: Donald Trump is acquitted by the United States Senate in his first impeachment trial.
- January 26: A helicopter crash in Calabasas, California kills nine people, including former National Basketball Association star Kobe Bryant and his daughter Gianna.
- January 31: The United Kingdom formally withdraws from the European Union.
- February 9: Bong Joon-ho's Parasite becomes the first South Korean film to receive Academy Award recognitions at the 92nd Academy Awards.
- March: The US goes into lockdown due to the global pandemic of COVID-19
- May:
  - Cyclone Amphan becomes the costliest cyclone ever recorded in the Northern Indian Ocean.
- May 25: The murder of George Floyd sparks protests across the United States and the world.
- May 30: Crewed spaceflight resumes in the United States for the first time since 2011.
- June 30: China's National People's Congress grants itself sweeping powers to curtail civil liberties in Hong Kong.
- July 10: Turkish President Recep Tayyip Erdoğan orders the Hagia Sophia in Istanbul to be reverted to a mosque following the annulment of a 1934 presidential decree that made it into a museum.
- July 30: NASA successfully launches its Mars 2020 rover mission to search for signs of ancient life and collect samples for return to Earth.
- August 4: An explosion caused by unsafely stored ammonium nitrate kills at least 218 people, injures thousands, and severely damages the port of Beirut, Lebanon.
- August 25: Africa is declared free of wild polio, the second virus to be eradicated from the continent since smallpox 40 years previously.
- August 26: Amazon CEO Jeff Bezos becomes the first person in history to have a net worth exceeding US$200 billion, according to Forbes.
- September 14:
  - The Royal Astronomical Society announces the detection of phosphine in Venus' atmosphere, which is known to be a strong predictor for the presence of microbial life.
  - The first discovery of the perfectly preserved remains of a cave bear, believed to be 22,000 to 39,500 years old (Late Pleistocene), is made in Lyakhovsky Islands, Siberia in the thawing permafrost.
- September 16: A United Nations Human Rights Council fact-finding mission formally accuses the Venezuelan government of crimes against humanity, including cases of killings, torture, violence against political opposition and disappearances since 2014.
- September 27–November 10: 2020 Nagorno-Karabakh war between Armenia and Azerbaijan.
- October 20: NASA's OSIRIS-REx spacecraft briefly touches down on 101955 Bennu, becoming the agency's first probe to retrieve samples from an asteroid, with its cargo returning to Earth in 2023.
- October 22: The Geneva Consensus Declaration on Promoting Women's Health and Strengthening the Family is signed by government representatives from 34 countries.
- October 23: At the end of an 11-year demining process, the Falkland Islands are declared free of land mines, 38 years after the end of the Falklands War.
- November 3: The 2020 United States presidential election occurs. Despite the pandemic, early voting and other factors result in the highest voter turnout since 1900, and a record of over 155 million votes cast. Although Joe Biden is declared the winner on November 7, Donald Trump leads an unprecedented effort to prevent official recognition of his defeat, culminating on January 6 the next year.
- November 3: The Tigray War begins in Ethiopia.
- November 15: The Regional Comprehensive Economic Partnership (RCEP) is signed by 15 Asia-Pacific countries to form the world's largest free-trade bloc, covering a third of the world's population.
- November 27: Iran's top nuclear scientist, Mohsen Fakhrizadeh, is assassinated near Tehran.
- November 30: Protein folding, one of the biggest mysteries in biology, is solved by AlphaFold, an artificial intelligence algorithm developed by DeepMind.
- December 1: The Arecibo Telescope of the Arecibo Observatory collapses, just weeks after the announcement of its planned demolition.
- December 2: The United Nations Commission on Narcotic Drugs votes to remove cannabis from a list of dangerous drugs in recognition of its medical value, although some controls will remain.
- December 8: Nepal and China officially agree on Mount Everest's actual height, which is 8,848.86m.
- December 18: Media outlets report that astronomers have detected a radio signal, BLC1, apparently from the direction of Proxima Centauri, the closest star to the Sun.
- December 21: A great conjunction of Jupiter and Saturn occurs, with the two planets separated in the sky by 0.1 degrees. This is the closest conjunction between the two planets since 1623.
- The COVID-19 pandemic, which began spreading late in the prior year, spreads from China to the vast majority of the world's inhabited areas, infecting at least 81 million and killing at least 1.8 million people in its first year.
- Fears of COVID-19 cause the Dow Jones Industrial Average to fall ten percent in one week, its largest drop in history, triggering the COVID-19 Recession, the worst economic crisis since the Great Depression.
- Silurian millipede Kampecaris obanensis, the oldest known land animal, is discovered in Scotland.
- China and India engage in border skirmishes, the largest escalation between the two powers in 50 years.
- China launches Chang'e 5 and becomes the third country after the US and the Soviet Union to return samples of the moon.

=== 2021 ===
- January 1: The African Continental Free Trade Area comes into effect.
- January 6: 2021 United States Capitol attack
- January 13: In Lyon, France, the first transplant of both arms and shoulders is performed on an Icelandic patient at the Édouard Herriot Hospital.
- January 13–February 13: Donald Trump is impeached for a second time following the events of January 6, but is acquitted again after his trial from February 9–13.
- January 20: Joe Biden is inaugurated as President of the United States. Kamala Harris, sworn in as vice president, becoming the first woman, first African American and first Asian American Vice President of the United States.
- January 22: The Treaty on the Prohibition of Nuclear Weapons, the first legally binding international agreement comprehensively to prohibit nuclear weapons, comes into effect.
- February 13–17: Winter Storm Uri becomes the costliest winter storm in North American history, costing $200 billion and 237 lives, and triggering the 2021 Texas power crisis.
- February 18: NASA's Mars 2020 mission (containing the Perseverance rover and Ingenuity helicopter drone) lands on Mars at Jezero Crater, after seven months of travel.
- March 6: Pope Francis meets with Grand Ayatollah Ali al-Sistani in Najaf, Iraq. It is the first-ever meeting between a pope and a grand ayatollah.
- March 20: Turkish President Recep Tayyip Erdoğan announces his country's withdrawal from the Istanbul Convention, the first country to do so.
- March 23–29: The container ship Ever Given obstructs the Suez Canal for six days, costing an estimated $3.6 billion in global trade.
- April 9: The death of Prince Philip, Duke of Edinburgh and husband of the Queen, at the age of 99.
- April 15: Scientists announce they successfully injected human stem cells into the embryos of monkeys, creating chimera-embryos.
- April 19:
  - Ingenuity becomes the first vehicle to fly in the atmosphere of another planet.
  - Miguel Díaz-Canel becomes First Secretary of the Communist Party of Cuba, replacing the Castro brothers, Fidel and Raúl, after 62 years.
- April 20: Idriss Déby, President of Chad, is killed in clashes with rebel forces after 30 years in office.
- June 7: The Juno spacecraft performs its only flyby of Jupiter's moon Ganymede, the first flyby of the moon by any spacecraft in over 20 years.
- June 19: Joe Biden signs Juneteenth National Independence Day Act into law, making Juneteenth a federal holiday. It is the first new federal holiday since Martin Luther King Jr. Day.
- July 7: Haitian President Jovenel Moïse, is assassinated in a midnight attack by unknown mercenaries.
- July 18: An international investigation reveals that spyware sold by Israel's NSO Group to different governments is being used to target heads of state, along with thousands of activists, journalists and dissidents around the world.
- July 19: Blue Origin successfully conducts its first human test flight, with a reusable New Shepard rocket delivering four crew members into space including its founder Jeff Bezos.
- July 28: The first direct observation of light from behind a black hole is reported, confirming Einstein's theory of general relativity.
- August 15: Kabul falls following the 2021 Taliban offensive, as the Islamic Republic of Afghanistan collapses, and the country is governed thereafter by the Taliban as the reinstated Islamic Emirate of Afghanistan. The War in Afghanistan thus ends after 20 years following the withdrawal of U.S. and coalition troops.
- August 30: The UN Environment Programme announces that leaded petrol in road vehicles has been phased out globally, a hundred years after its introduction.
- September 7: El Salvador becomes the first country in the world to accept Bitcoin as an official currency.
- September 15: A trilateral security pact between Australia, the United Kingdom, and the United States is formed to counter Chinese influence. This includes enabling Australia to build its first nuclear-powered submarine fleet.
- September 16: Inspiration4, launched by SpaceX, becomes the first all-civilian spaceflight, carrying a four-person crew on a three-day orbit of the Earth.
- October 3: The International Consortium of Investigative Journalists and assorted media partners publish a set of 11.9 million documents leaked from 14 financial services companies known as the Pandora Papers, revealing offshore financial activities that involve multiple current and former world leaders.
- October 6: The World Health Organization endorses the first malaria vaccine.
- November 30: Barbados becomes a republic on its 55th anniversary of independence while remaining a member of the Commonwealth of Nations.
- The COVID-19 pandemic continues, infecting more than 220 million and killing at least 3.6 million people in its second year. The true totals of infected and dead are estimated to be much higher.
- Coups d'état occur in Myanmar, Mali and Guinea.
- 197 nations sign the Glasgow Climate Pact, agreeing to limit the use of coal, and the Netherlands legally mandates Royal Dutch Shell to comply with the Paris Agreement.

=== 2022 ===
- January–September: Coups d'état in Burkina Faso.
- January 15: The Hunga Tonga–Hunga Haʻapai eruption and tsunami is the largest and most powerful volcanic eruption in decades, and the largest explosion ever recorded by modern instruments.
- February 4–20: The 2022 Winter Olympics are held in Beijing, China, making it the first city ever to host both the Summer Olympics and Winter Olympics.
- February 24: Russia invades Ukraine, escalating the Russo-Ukrainian War, causing a refugee crisis and tens of thousands of deaths on both sides.
- March 20: WHL0137-LS "Earendel" imaged by Hubble Space Telescope, the earliest and most distant known star.
- March 15–November 14: Sri Lankan protests.
- April 14: Acquisition of Twitter by Elon Musk
- April 19: Kane Tanaka, the second oldest verified person to have ever lived, dies at the age of 119.
- May 6: Monkeypox outbreak.
- May 12: Sagittarius A*, supermassive black hole at Galactic Center, imaged by Event Horizon Telescope.
- June 12–September 12: Heat waves in Europe kill tens of thousands.
- July 8: Assassination of Shinzo Abe.
- July 11: James Webb Space Telescope takes Webb's First Deep Field, oldest and highest resolution image of the universe to date.
- July 22: Chinese paddlefish declared extinct.
- August 24: "Man of the Hole", reclusive indigenous Brazilian and last of his ethnicity, dies.
- August 31: Mikhail Gorbachev, the last leader of the Soviet Union, dies at age 91.
- September 8: Death and state funeral of Elizabeth II
- September 16: Mahsa Amini protests.
- September 26: Double Asteroid Redirection Test demonstrates capabilities on asteroid (65803) Didymos I Dimorphos.
- November 2: Ethiopia–Tigray peace agreement.
- November 11: The FTX cryptocurrency exchange files for Chapter 11 bankruptcy.
- November 15: The world population is estimated to have reached 8 billion.
- November 16: NASA launches Artemis 1, the first uncrewed mission of its Space Launch System, the most powerful rocket ever to reach orbit.
- November 30: OpenAI launches ChatGPT, an AI chatbot.
- December 7: Self-coup attempt, impeachment and arrest of President Pedro Castillo sparks protests in Peru.
- December 13:
  - National Ignition Facility achieves first fusion ignition.
  - President Biden signs the Respect for Marriage Act, which federally protects same-sex and interracial marriages by requiring states to recognize each others' marriage standards.

=== 2023 ===
- January–October: 2023 Israeli judicial reform protests.
- January 1: Croatia adopts the Euro and joins the Schengen Area.
- January 8: 2023 Brazilian Congress attack.
- February 6: 2023 Turkey-Syria earthquakes kill nearly 60,000 people.
- February 21: Cyclone Freddy kills 1,400 in Malawi and Mozambique.
- April 4: Finland joins NATO.
- April 13: R21/Matrix-M malaria vaccine approved for use.
- April 15: Sudanese civil war (2023–present) begins.
- April 20: SpaceX conducts the first full stack test launch of the world's most powerful rocket, Starship.
- May 5: World Health Organization ends the designation of COVID-19 as a public health emergency of international concern.
- May 6: Charles III is crowned king of the United Kingdom and Commonwealth realms.
- June 23–24: The Wagner Group rebellion against the Russian government occurs as a result of conflict with the Russian Ministry of Defense over the use of the group in the Russian invasion of Ukraine.
- July 26: 2023 Nigerien coup d'état.
- August 23: ISRO's Chandrayaan 3 lands on the lunar south pole making India the 4th nation to successfully soft land on the Moon.
- August 30: 2023 Gabonese coup d'état.
- September 8: 2023 Marrakesh-Safi earthquake kills nearly 6,000 people.
- September 10: Storm Daniel becomes the deadliest Mediterranean storm in history, with over 4,000 deaths in Libya.
- September 19–20: 2023 Azerbaijani offensive in Nagorno-Karabakh.
- October 7:
  - Hamas attacks Israel; start of the Gaza war.
  - 2023 Herat earthquakes.
- October 23: 2023 Guayana Esequiba crisis.
- November 24: Somalia admitted to East African Community.
- December 12: COP28 ends with world leaders pledging transition away from fossil fuels.
- December 18: Catholic Church releases Fiducia supplicans.
- December 31: Queen Margrethe II of Denmark announces her abdication on January 14 after 52 years on the throne.
- The International Criminal Court issues an arrest warrant for Vladimir Putin.
- 2023 is the hottest year on record.

=== 2024 ===
- January 16–18: Iran-Pakistan border skirmishes.
- January 19: JAXA's first lunar probe, SLIM, lands on moon.
- February 22: Intuitive Machines lands first private lunar probe, Nova-C, on moon.
- March 7: Sweden joins NATO.
- March 22: Crocus City Hall attack.
- May 15: Attempted assassination of Robert Fico.
- May 19: Varzaqan helicopter crash.
- May 29: African National Congress loses parliamentary majority for first time since end of Apartheid in South African general election.
- June 18: Same-sex marriage legalised in Thailand.
- June 24: Julian Assange released from prison in UK after accepting US plea bargain, returns to Australia.
- July 1–August 5: Student-People's uprising in Bangladesh.
- July 13: Attempted assassination of Donald Trump in Pennsylvania.
- July 19: ICJ finds Israeli occupation of Palestinian territories a violation of international law.
- October 1–December 31: Israeli invasion of Lebanon.
- November 5: Donald Trump wins US presidential election.
- November 21: International Criminal Court arrest warrants for Israeli leaders.
- December 3–4: South Korean martial law crisis.
- December 8: Fall of the Assad regime.

=== 2025 ===
- January 1: Romania and Bulgaria join the Schengen Area.
- January 6: Indonesia becomes the tenth member to join BRICS.
- January 7
  - A 7.1 magnitude earthquake strikes Tibet, China, killing at least 126 people, while another 338 are injured.
  - Greater Los Angeles experiences the most destructive wildfires in its history, fueled by strong winds and prolonged drought conditions. Over 13,000 structures are destroyed. At least 29 deaths are reported, while 180,000 people are evacuated, with fires continuing for days.
- January 8: Eighteen gunmen and a soldier are killed in an attack on the presidential palace in N'Djamena, the capital of Chad.
- January 9: The Commander of the Lebanese Armed Forces, Joseph Aoun, is elected the 14th president of Lebanon by parliament, ending the power vacuum that lasted over two years.
- January 10: The European Copernicus Climate Change Service reports that 2024 was the world's hottest year on record, and the first calendar year to pass the symbolic threshold of 1.5 °C of global warming.
- January 20: Donald Trump is inaugurated as President of the United States for a second, nonconsecutive term. He is the second person, after Grover Cleveland, to serve a nonconsecutive second term.
- March 2: Firefly Aerospace becomes the first private company to land a probe on lunar surface in Blue Ghost Mission 1.
- March 11: Arrest of Rodrigo Duterte to stand trial before International Criminal Court.
- March 28: 2025 Myanmar earthquake.
- April 21 – May 8: Pope Francis dies, leading to the election of Pope Leo XIV. He is the first pope born in the United States.
- May 12: End of Kurdistan Workers' Party insurgency.
- June 13 – June 24: Twelve-Day War.
- June 22: United States strikes on Iranian nuclear sites.
- July 24: Cambodian-Thai border crisis.
- August 8: Armenia-Azerbaijan peace agreement.
- August 22: United Nations recognises Gaza Strip famine.
- September 8: Nepalese Gen Z protests.
- September 9: Israeli attack on Doha.
- September 10: conservative activist and political commentator Charlie Kirk is assassinated.
- October 13: The last 20 living hostages taken by Hamas during the October 7 attacks are released.
- October 21: Sanae Takaichi becomes the first woman elected as Prime Minister of Japan.
- November 25 – November 30: Cyclone Senyar kills at least 1,501 people in Indonesia, Thailand and Malaysia.
- November 26 – December 4: Cyclone Ditwah kills at least 647 people in Sri Lanka and South India.
- December 26: Israel recognizes Somaliland, the first country to do so.
- December 28: The 2025–2026 Iranian protests begin.

== See also ==
- Timeline of the 20th century
- Timelines of the future
