= Reactions to the assassination of Jamal Khashoggi =

The assassination of Jamal Khashoggi, a Saudi dissident, journalist for The Washington Post and former general manager and editor-in-chief of Al-Arab News Channel, occurred on 2 October 2018 at the Saudi consulate in Istanbul and was denounced by the majority of the international community.

For 18 days, Saudi Arabia denied Khashoggi had died in the consulate, before indicating a team of Saudi agents had overstepped their orders to capture him when a struggle ensued leading to his death. Turkey said it believes the killing was premeditated and approved by the Saudi government, and sought extradition of the suspects.

The President of the United States, Donald Trump, expressed support for Saudi government reserving judgment about culpability. This created a bipartisan uproar in Congress, shaking the foundations of the close American-Saudi relationship with calls for suspension of military sales. President Joe Biden, since taking office, also has not taken action against Saudi Arabia for the assassination.

Most countries without a direct tie to Saudi Arabia called for a transparent investigation and condemned the killing. Countries with direct ties characterize the aftermath as a media campaign against Saudi Arabia.

== Saudi Arabia ==
When the news of disappearance of Khashoggi broke out Saudi Arabia claimed he had left the consulate and denied having any knowledge about his fate. Turkish media published evidence suggesting that Khashoggi never came out of the consulate. Saudi Arabia denied any involvement in the case. The international community called for more clarity on the case from Saudi authorities, pressuring Saudi Arabia both politically and economically. Meanwhile, the Turkish authorities leaked facts from the ongoing investigation of the case that refuted Saudi claims.

On 19 October, the Saudi officials admitted Khashoggi died inside the consulate due to strangulation after an argument and fistfight. Saudi Arabian foreign minister called it a "rogue operation" and on 25 October the Saudi prosecutor stated that Turkish-supplied evidence indicates the suspects acted with premeditated intention.

=== Initial denial of involvement ===
On 3 October, Saudi officials claimed Khashoggi had left the consulate alive, and that he was neither in the consulate nor in Saudi custody. The Saudis denied having any knowledge of his fate. Saudi Arabia's Crown Prince Mohammad bin Salman claimed Khashoggi left the consulate shortly after the visit.

On 8 October, Prince Khalid bin Salman, brother of the Crown Prince and Saudi Ambassador to the U.S., published a letter stating that Khashoggi went missing after leaving the consulate. The English-language Arab News on 10 October 2018 reported that Prince Khalid "condemns 'malicious leaks and grim rumors'" and denied any involvement by the Saudi government. On October 15, Saudi Arabia threatened to retaliate against any nation that levelled sanctions against it.

Saudi Arabia is the world's largest oil exporter, but has historically avoided using oil exports as a political tool. On October 15, Turki Aldakhil, the head of Al Arabiya, the Saudi-owned pan-Arab news network based in Dubai, made comments suggesting that the nation would break this tradition: "If President Trump was angered by $80 oil, nobody should rule out the price jumping to $100 and $200 a barrel or maybe double that figure." The Saudi embassy in Washington said Aldakhil didn't represent the country's official position, and Khalid A. Al-Falih, the Saudi energy minister, said his country would act responsibly.

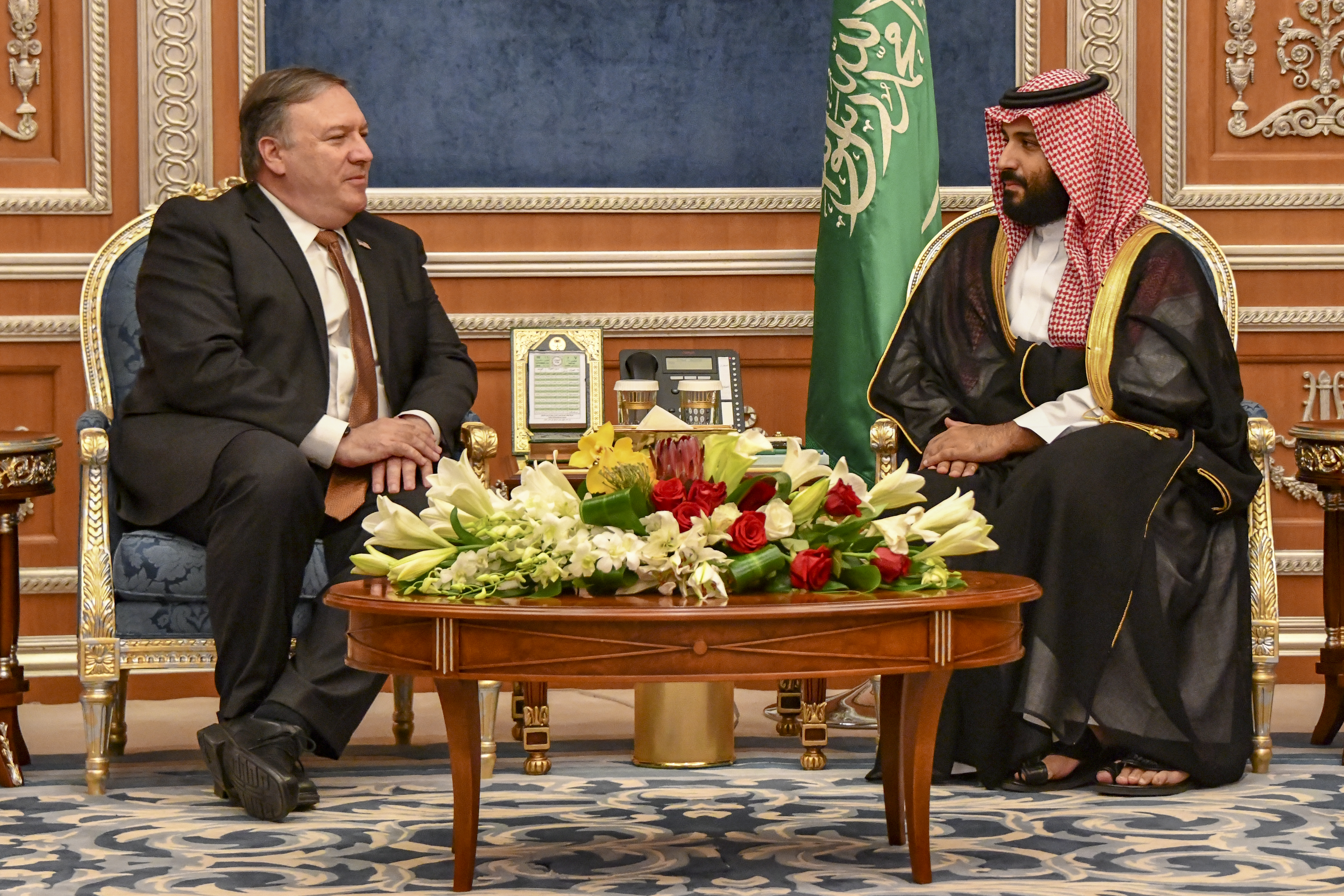
On 16 October 2018, Saudi Crown Prince met with Secretary of State Mike Pompeo to discuss the Khashoggi case

That same week, Saudi Arabia's Office of Public Prosecution tweeted that anyone "affect[ing] the public order or public security" on social media by suggesting that the government was involved in Khashoggi's disappearance could be punished "by five years and a fine of 3 million riyals". Twitter subsequently suspended a number of bot accounts that appeared to be spreading pro-Saudi tweets about the disappearance of Khashoggi.

News reports on Al Arabiya claimed that reports of Khashoggi's disappearance inside the Saudi consulate have been pushed by Qatar. Saudi daily newspaper Okaz claimed that Qatar has a "50 percent ownership of the [Washington] Post and has influence over its editorial direction". Another Saudi newspaper, Al Yaum, claimed that members of the alleged death squad were actually tourists.

The New York Times reported that on 16 October, Saudi Arabia transferred $100 million to the American government, purportedly for its stabilization efforts in Syria, on the same day U.S. Secretary of State Mike Pompeo arrived in Riyadh for the discussion on Khashoggi with the Saudi king, the crown prince, and the foreign minister. Brett McGurk, the U.S. envoy to the coalition against ISIL, dismissed any connection between the events and had expected the payment in the fall. Saudi Arabia had pledged the money in August without confirming any timelines, and it was unclear to one anonymous official if the payment would ever be made. The Washington Post reported that Saudi Arabia has historically provided large sums of money to other countries to support its foreign policy objectives.

=== Arrests and admission of involvement ===
On 19 October, Washington Post reported that Saudi Arabia had arrested 18 unnamed people related to the case, while denying the involvement of Prince bin Salman or King Salman. Saudi Arabia also dismissed five officials of senior rank due to their alleged involvement with the case, including bin Salman's court advisor Saud al-Qahtani, and Ahmad Asiri, the deputy chief of the Saudi intelligence service. Major General Mohammed bin Saleh al-Rumaih, assistant head of the General Intelligence Directorate; Maj. Gen. Abdullah bin Khalifa al-Shaya, head of General Intelligence for Human Resources; and Gen. Rashad bin Hamed al-Mohammad, director of the General Directorate of Security and Protection, were also fired.

The following day, after 18 days of the denial of any involvement with Khashoggi's disappearance, the Saudi government admitted that he had died in the consulate, confirming the Saudi prosecutor's statement. The Saudi government released a statement based on their prosecutor's preliminary investigation which alleged that the suspects met Khashoggi in Istanbul to speak to him about his desire to return to Saudi Arabia. According to this statement, the discussion "developed in a negative way" which led to a fight that ended with Khashoggi's death, prompting the cover-up. Later on 20 October, an anonymous Saudi official was quoted in the news providing a similar account. No evidence was provided at the time to support this explanation of events, and no information was given regarding the whereabouts of Khashoggi's body. The Saudi government said that it would need another month to investigate the death.

During an interview with Fox News on 21 October, Saudi Foreign Minister Adel al-Jubeir called Khashoggi's death a murder. It was the first time any official from the Saudi government had done so. He went on to describe the assassination as a "rogue operation" and a "tremendous mistake" that had been compounded by the cover-up attempts. He denied Prince bin Salman's involvement and knowledge, claimed not to know the location of Khashoggi's body, and stated that Saudi Arabia would conduct a full investigation into the murder.

The same day, Reuters reported that an anonymous government official provided further detail on the death. He said Khashoggi was allegedly threatened with drugging and kidnapping by Maher Mutreb. After resisting, he was restrained with a chokehold and died. Mustafa Madani then left through the back door of the consulate disguised as Khashoggi to deceive any observers. Khashoggi's body was rolled up in a carpet and given to a "local cooperator" for disposal. When questioned about Khashoggi's alleged torture and decapitation, the official said preliminary findings did not suggest that happened. The official provided Saudi documents indicating the operation was part of a wider initiative to bring expatriate dissidents home. The original plan was to keep Khashoggi in an Istanbul safe house for a period where he would be persuaded to return home or eventually released, and Mutreb had overstepped by threatening a kidnapping. The team then filed a false report indicating they let Khashoggi leave after he warned of Turkish police interference.

On 25 October, Saudi General Attorney Saud al-Mujeb said information received from joint working team of Saudi and Turkish investigators indicated that the crime was premeditated.

On 6 November, Al-Jazeera quoted a Turkish official saying that Turkey was informed by Saudi Arabia that it will pay "diya" (a type of financial compensation for harm mandated by Islamic law) to Khashoggi's sons and fiancée. In April 2019, it was reported the four Khashoggi children were given houses believed to be worth up to $4m each, and monthly payments of around $10,000 by Saudis Arabia.

On 9 November Prince Turki al-Faisal, KSA's ex-intelligence chief said the kingdom would "never accept" an international investigation into Khashoggi's murder. On 10 November, Reuters reported quoting intelligence sources that there was no indication of the arrest of any suspect.

On 20 November Saudi Arabia's foreign minister Adel al-Jubeir said claims by the CIA's assessment that crown prince Mohammed gave the order to kill Khashoggi are false: "The leadership of the kingdom of Saudi Arabia, represented by the Custodian of the Two Holy Mosques (the king) and the crown prince, is a red line, and we will not permit attempts to harm or undermine them".

=== Changes to the Royal Court ===
After the Khashoggi assassination, multiple reports indicate that the Saudi regime underwent its worst crisis since the September 11 attacks and the entire House of Saud emerged weakened as a result. The international outrage added pressure to the already divided royal court over Prince Mohammed's rapid ascension to power.

On 30 October, former interior minister Prince Ahmed bin Abdulaziz Al Saud, who was seen by academics as a figure of special gravitas and as a critic of his nephew Crown Prince Mohammed, returned from his exile to Riyadh with a private security detail provided by US and UK officials and reassurances for safe passage from the king. He had been living in London for the last six years. According to multiple reports, Prince Ahmed's return was considered the most significant development in the royal family since the assassination and did suggest the Saudi royal family may be trying to internally restructure the dynasty.

Saudi dissident Prince Khaled bin Farhan said that if the senior princes Ahmed and Muqrin were to unite ranks, then "99 percent of the members of the royal family, the security services and the army would stand behind them" and could restore the reputation of the family, which has been damaged by King Salman's "irrational, erratic and stupid" rule. Saudi sources reported Mohammed bin Salman "Destroyed the institutional pillars of nearly a century of Al Saud rule: the family, the clerics, the tribes and the merchant families" which they considered as "destabilizing".

On 3 November, Crown Prince Mohammed released Khalid bin Talal, the younger brother of Alwaleed bin Talal, after almost a year in prison, which according to Middle East Eye, was an effort to mitigate the effect of his uncle's return. He had refused to make concessions to be referred to a court of law. Their father Prince Talal had been pressing since the 1960s to turn KSA into a constitutional monarchy.

Madawi al-Rasheed, professor at the Middle East Centre at the London School of Economics and Political Science (LSE) and "an important Saudi intellectual in exile", wrote: "Princes are the only conduit by which the United States knows how to deal with Saudi Arabia, and no normal diplomatic measures exist for holding a rogue prince accountable."

According to Reuters, princes from various branches of the Al Saud family opposed the king's favorite son and campaigned to prevent crown prince Mohammed from becoming king. The succession to the throne in KSA is decided by the Allegiance Council, a body where each branch of the ruling family selects the heir they consider fittest to lead.

=== Social media campaign ===
According to Saudi women's rights activist Manal al-Sharif, Saudi authorities effectively prevented Saudi citizens from seeing the hashtag #JamalKhashoggi or hashtags containing the word "Jamal" by swamping Saudi social media, for the first two weeks following Khashoggi's assassination, with the hashtags #Kidnapping_Ant_and_Cockroach and #Aljamal_Jamal_Alrouh. Al-Sharif stated that by late October 2018, the Arabic equivalent of "I am Arab and Mohammed bin Salman represents me" had become the third-highest trending hashtag worldwide. Al-Sharif interpreted the situation by stating that "it became evident to me that we had lost these social media platforms to the dictators."

== Turkey ==
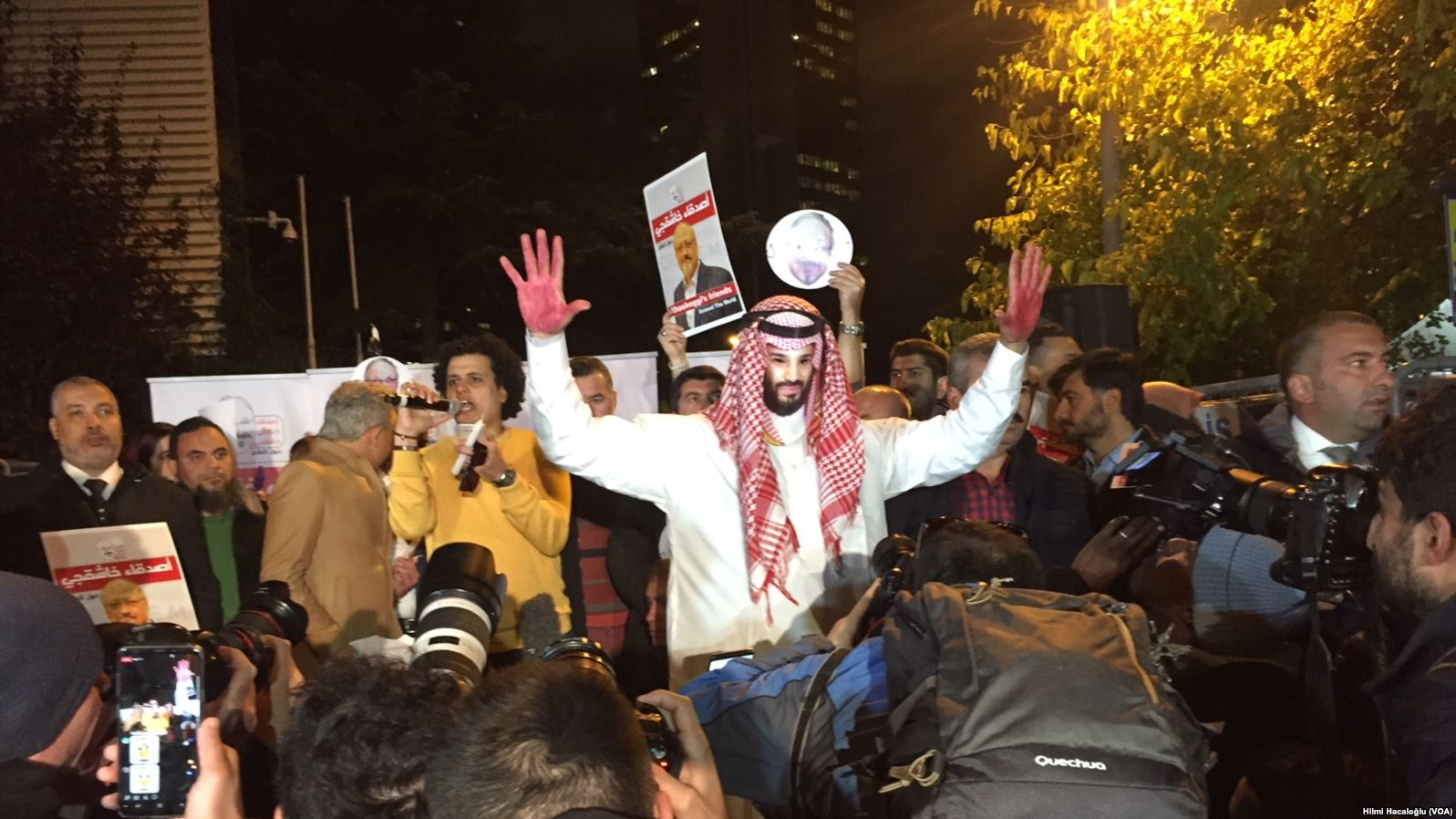
Protest in front of the Saudi consulate in Istanbul

President Recep Tayyip Erdoğan demanded that the Saudi government provide proof for their claims that Khashoggi left the consulate alive, something that police CCTV did not capture. Neil Quilliam, a senior research fellow with Chatham House's Middle East and North Africa program, told Business Insider that "The staccato nature of the Turkish response suggests that they were prepared to offer the Saudis a way out of the crisis – at least provide them with an off-ramp – but given the Saudi response or lack of it, the authorities continue to share more and more details."

The politician Numan Kurtulmuş, of the ruling Justice and Development Party, said that "it's not possible for the Saudi administration to wiggle itself out of this crime if it's confirmed."

On 23 October, President Erdoğan made a speech about the assassination to the Turkish Parliament; it was his first public statement about Khashoggi's death. He described the murder as Turkish officials understood it, rejecting the Saudi claim of an "accidental killing" and saying that Turkey had evidence that it was a "premeditated political murder". He continued by saying that he was not satisfied with the arrests of the 18 Saudis and pressed for them to be extradited and tried in Turkey. He stated that he believed King Salman had been acting sincerely, but did not mention Prince bin Salman, widely suspected of involvement.

On 26 October, the prosecutor's office in Istanbul submitted an extradition request for the eighteen suspects in the case. President Erdogan asked Saudis to disclose the location of the dead body. He also argued that the suspects should face trial in Turkey. Foreign minister Mevlüt Çavuşoğlu told reporters that he wanted to know where Khashoggi's body is: "There is a crime here, but there is also a humanitarian situation, the family wants to know and they want to perform their last duty", referring to the family and friends hopes to bury Khashoggi's body.

On 31 October, a Turkish prosecutor stated that Turkish investigators believed that Khashoggi had been strangled upon entering the consulate, then dismembered and disposed of. It was the first such accusation by a Turkish official.

On 10 November Erdogan stated that the audio recordings related to the killing were given to Britain, France, Germany, Saudi Arabia and the United States to maintain the pressure from the international community on Saudi Arabia.

SBS reported that Turkish President Recep Tayyip Erdoğan "has been relentless in his pursuit of Saudi Arabia over the killing of journalist Jamal Khashoggi inside their consulate in Istanbul. But inside his own country, Erdogan's has used a similar approach to attack local journalists and critics", part of a massive purge against Erdoğan's perceived enemies. According to Mustafa Kuleli, general secretary of the Journalists Union of Turkey, "Journalist organizations in Turkey are trying to cope with colossal problems with very few professionals: thousands of trials against members, news organizations shut down, unemployment, poor working conditions. We are every day in the courts supporting journalists. I understand why time could not be devoted to the Khashoggi case."

On 24 January 2019 Turkey announced that it would launch an international investigation in Khashoggi's murder and accused the United States of a cover up. The inquirity is to be led by Agnes Callamard, the United Nations special rapporteur on extrajudicial, summary or arbitrary executions.

== United States ==
President Donald Trump expressed concern about the fate of Khashoggi, and Secretary of State Mike Pompeo called on Saudi Arabia "to support a thorough investigation of Mr. Khashoggi's disappearance and to be transparent about the results of that investigation". After speaking to the Saudi king by phone, Trump said that Salman "denies any knowledge of whatever may have happened... The denial was very, very strong. It sounded to me like maybe these could have been rogue killers. Who knows?" On 16 October, Trump dispatched Pompeo to Riyadh to meet with King Salman, where he "reiterated U.S. concern over Khashoggi's disappearance", while also thanking the king for his "commitment to a thorough, transparent investigation".

The reported killing created a bipartisan uproar in Congress, shaking the foundations of the close American-Saudi relationship with calls for suspension of military sales. Senior Republican senator Lindsey Graham's reaction was stern, as he said "there would be hell to pay" if Saudi is involved in the murder of Khashoggi. He further added, "If they're this brazen, it shows contempt. Contempt for everything we stand for, contempt for the relationship." Chris Murphy, a junior Democratic senator, wrote that if the reports are true "it should represent a fundamental break in our relationship with Saudi Arabia." Murphy also called for at least a temporary halt in military support for the Saudi Arabian-led intervention in Yemen. The United States Congress can block or modify an arms sale.

Former ambassador to Saudi Arabia Robert Jordan said on 12 October that he is "95 percent certain" that Saudi Arabia killed Jamal Khashoggi.

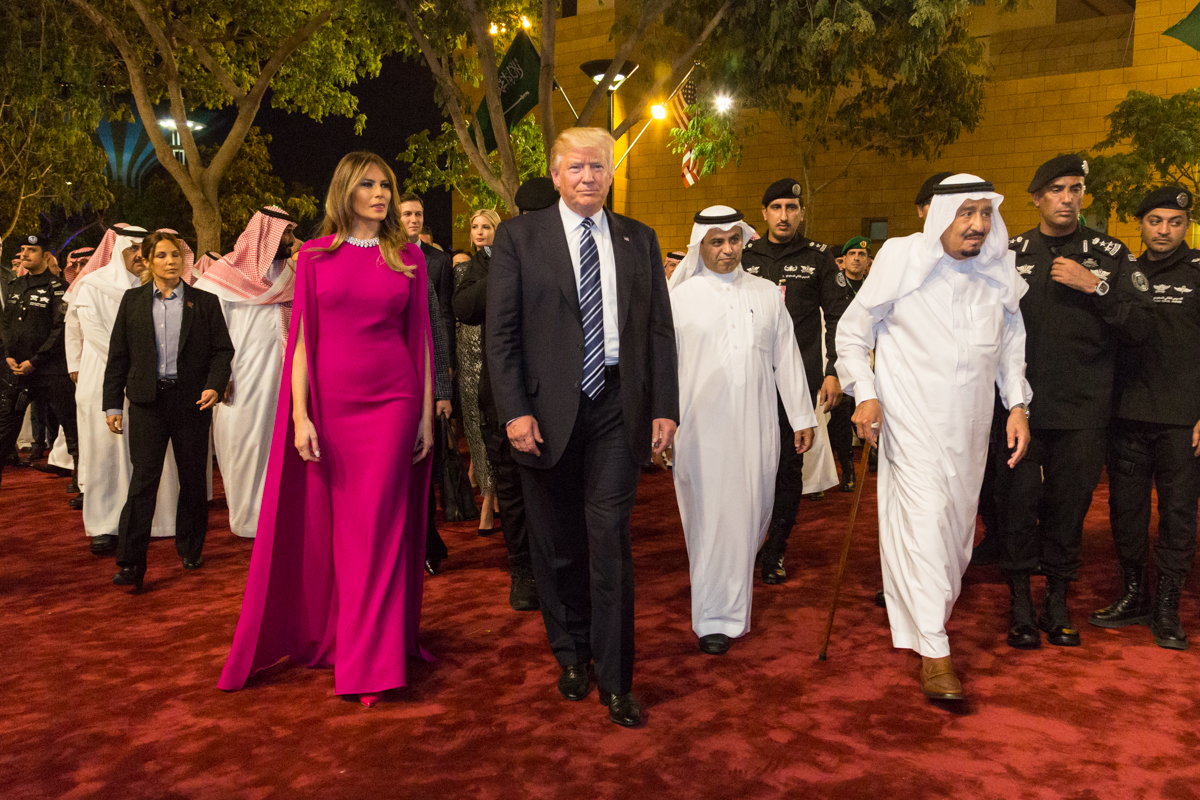
Riyadh summit: On 20 May 2017, President Donald Trump signed the United States–Saudi Arabia arms deal.

Senator Rand Paul said that he would attempt to force a vote on blocking future arms sales to Saudi Arabia. Senator Bob Corker, the chair of the Senate Foreign Relations Committee, sent a letter to Trump over Khashoggi's disappearance. Signed by the entire Committee other than Senator Paul who prepared his own letter, it "instructs the administration to determine whether Khashoggi was indeed kidnapped, tortured, or murdered by the Saudi government and, as the Global Magnitsky Act requires, to respond within 120 days with a determination of sanctions against individuals who may have been responsible".

Senator Bernie Sanders denounced the Trump administration, saying that "Saudi Crown Prince Mohammad bin Salman feels emboldened by the Trump administration's unquestioning support."

Trump told journalists: "I know [Senators] are talking about different kinds of sanctions, but [the Saudis] are spending $110 billion on military equipment and on things that create jobs for this country." Trump, in responding specifically to the Senate's attempt to block the Saudi arms deal, stated that the blocking of such a deal "would not be acceptable to me". While opposing trade sanctions, Trump remained open to the possibility of other forms of what he described as the "severe punishment" of Saudi Arabia.

Senator Richard Blumenthal stated: "All American businesses and nonprofit organizations should review and re-evaluate their relationships with Saudi Arabia in light of the ... murder, which seemingly could not have been done without knowledge at the highest levels of its government."

In the wake of Khashoggi's murder, universities and think tanks faced renewed scrutiny over their close ties to KSA. In March 2018 UC Berkeley, Harvard University, Yale Law School and the Massachusetts Institute of Technology (MIT) Media Lab, one of the university's most famous laboratories, had accepted a visit from crown prince Mohammad bin Salman. At MIT Media Lab he was shown demos of war-related technologies like autonomous robots which are used for military purposes, made by a company called Boston Dynamics, which is an MIT affiliate. The visits to MIT and Harvard were not widely publicized or accompanied by public events, and the visit was held in spite of protests and petitions demanding its cancellation. In light of the visits and subsequent assassination of Khashoggi, student newspapers called for the schools to cut ties with the Saudi Government. MIT's president L. Rafael Reif has previously defended their relationship with the Saudi government, pointing to a Saudi fellowship which has brought 27 Saudi women PhDs to the school and arguing that "not engaging neither creates nor encourages significant positive change". The Brookings Institution chose to terminate their sole research grant with the Saudi government on 12 October 12.

Former National Security Adviser Susan Rice wrote in The New York Times on 29 October that "As this litany of lunacy shows, Prince Mohammed is not and can no longer be viewed as a reliable or rational partner of the United States and our allies." She demanded: "We need to stop privileging Jared Kushner's relationship with the crown prince, and finally fill the vacant ambassadorship to the kingdom, to engage with a broader range of senior Saudi officials. President Trump's inexplicable infatuation with Prince Mohammed must end, and he must recalibrate American policy so that it serves our national interests – not his personal interests or those of the crown prince."

In Washington, a petition launched to rename the section of New Hampshire Avenue where the Saudi embassy is located as "Jamal Khashoggi Way". After a memorial service for Jamal Khashoggi in London on 29 October 2018, his long-time friend Nihad Awad and head of Council on American-Islamic Relations (CAIR), urged to begin petitions in every city where Riyadh has a diplomatic mission.

In a phone call with Crown Prince Mohammed on 11 November, Secretary of State Pompeo ″emphasized that the United States will hold all of those involved in the killing of Khashoggi accountable, and that Saudi Arabia must do the same″.

=== Nuclear proliferation ===
In the letter to President Trump on 31 October a group of Republican senators urged a halt on selling US nuclear power equipment to Saudi Arabia. They wrote they have long had reservations about selling nuclear technology and stressed that the Saudis have balked a 123 agreements – a civilian nuclear agreement setting non-proliferation standards to prevent the country from building a nuclear weapon by setting limits on uranium enrichment, as well the reprocessing of spent fuels. The senators called for KSA to accept the "Gold Standard" for nuclear non-proliferation enshrined in US agreements, especially in light of President Trump's efforts to block Iran's path to a weapon. In an CBS interview in March 2018, Crown Prince Mohammed made clear that even if the KSA were not actively pursuing a nuclear weapon, the Saudi adherence to the Nuclear Nonproliferation Treaty is conditional and could change suddenly.

Henry Sokolski, head of the Nonproliferation Policy Education Center, deliberated "any negotiations regarding a US-Saudi nuclear cooperation agreement should be halted. If the Trump administration refuses to do this, Congress should make clear, as part of its broader response to the Khashoggi killing, that any agreement submitted for review will be blocked."

16 days after Khashoggi was assassinated the Trump administration granted the first authorizations to US-companies to share sensitive nuclear power information with Saudi Arabia. After repeated requests, the US Department of Energy informed the Senate in June 2019 that, of a total of seven permits for nuclear technical expertise transfers. An authorization approval occurred 18 February 2019. In the past, 810 authorizations had been made available for the public to view at department headquarters. US-Senator from Virginia Tim Kaine called the timing of the approvals "shocking" and said it adds to a "disturbing pattern of behavior" of the administration's policy on Saudi Arabia. Kaine stated: "There is something going on where Saudi Arabia gets just a complete free pass that no other nation in the world gets from this administration. I don't know why that it is but I think we have to dig into it and figure it out. I want to dig into the companies that get the nuclear approval. I think we need to do more work to explore their financial ties to the Trump family."

=== Visit by Secretary of State Pompeo ===
According to CNN, US Secretary of State Mike Pompeo during his visit to Saudi Arabia had told Mohammad Bin Salman that "his future as king depends on his handling of Khashoggi's suspected murder." Pompeo emphasized that if Saudi Arabia failed to investigate, the US would feel the need to step in. On 15 October The Washington Post reported that Trump had been receiving bipartisan pressure to intervene in the situation. President Trump stated on October 19 that he wanted to issue sanctions against Saudi Arabia, but did not want to cancel an existing deal that included "$110 billion worth of work, which means 600,000 jobs" purely "as retribution". According to the New York Times, Trump's reluctance in some part came from his administration's plans for Iran. The US government was planning to reimpose economic sanctions against Iran, with a view to blocking its oil exports, on November 5. They had anticipated relying on Saudi Arabia to provide oil and coordinate foreign policy with the US; issuing sanctions against Saudi Arabia would interfere with that plan.

=== Response of President Trump after confirmation of killing ===
Commenting on the Saudi explanation that Khashoggi died inside the consulate after a fight, Trump said he considered it credible and called the official statement a "good first step". Several Republican senators, including Marco Rubio, Lindsey Graham, Bob Corker, and Rand Paul, have demanded a definitive response from the Trump administration towards Saudi Arabia, with the Trump administration yet remaining unwilling to impose any specific sanctions on the country. In response to Trump's apparent faith in the most recently revised official Saudi version of the killing, The Washington Post CEO Fred Ryan said, "The Saudis cannot be allowed to fabricate a face-saving solution to an atrocity that appears to have been directed by the highest levels of their government."

In a 20 October interview with the Washington Post, Trump acknowledged that Saudi statements had contained "deception," but said he had not yet seen evidence confirming the involvement of the Crown prince. When asked about the possibility of sanctions on Saudi Arabia, Trump stated it was too early to decide. On 21 October, Trump affirmed to reporters in the White House that he was "not satisfied" with Saudi Arabia's explanation, criticising their request to have one month to investigate the situation themselves. He said he had "people over in Saudi Arabia now. We have top intelligence people in Turkey, and we're going to see what we have. I'll know a lot tomorrow." However, he was hesitant to cancel the arms sale deal with Saudi Arabia. CNN reported that, according to sources, CIA director Gina Haspel was traveling to Turkey that day in relation to the Turkish Khashoggi investigation. When asked about this report the CIA did not offer comment.

That day when questioned by reporters at the oval office, Trump said of the Saudis' actions after Khashoggi's death that "They had a very bad original concept, it was carried out poorly, and the cover-up was the worst in the history of cover-ups. They had the worst-cover up ever". In an interview with The Wall Street Journal, Trump said that Mohammad bin Salman may have been behind Khashoggi's death. US officials have stated that the killing could not have been done without having the authorization of Prince bin Salman who is the de facto ruler. According to anonymous US officials, the CIA has concluded that Mohammed bin Salman ordered the assassination; the conclusion is based on multiple sources, including a phone call in which Khalid bin Salman, brother of Mohammed bin Salman and Saudi Ambassador to the U.S., assured Khashoggi would be safe go to the Saudi consulate in Istanbul to retrieve the documents for the marriage. A Saudi Embassy spokeswoman stated "the claims in this purported assessment are false" and Khalid bin Salman denied talking to Khashoggi by phone or suggesting that he should to go to Turkey.

On 13 November 2018, President Trump announced the nomination of retired Army Gen. John Abizaid as U.S. Ambassador to Saudi Arabia, a post that was vacant for nearly two years.

=== Sanctions on Saudi individuals ===
On 23 October, Trump's Secretary of State Mike Pompeo announced that the US was taking action against 21 Saudi individuals they believed were involved in Khashoggi's death, who will have their visas revoked or will be made ineligible for one. He also said he talked to the Treasury Department about the applicability of sanctions against those involved. On 15 November, The US treasury department declared that it has imposed economic sanctions on 17 Saudi officials who it said had "targeted and brutally killed" Khashoggi, who lived and worked in the US, and that these 17 individuals "must face consequences for their actions". The list of sanctioned included Qahtani, Mutreb, and Alotaibi. The declaration stated "Saud al-Qahtani is a senior official of the Government of Saudi Arabia who was part of the planning and execution of the operation that led to the killing... This operation was coordinated and executed by his subordinate Maher Mutreb... The Saudi consulate in Istanbul, where Mr. Khashoggi was killed, was overseen by Consul General Mohammed Alotaibi."

=== CIA assessment ===
On 16 November 2018, a CIA assessment was leaked to the media that with "high confidence" crown prince Mohammed bin Salman ordered Khashoggi's assassination. Regardless, President Trump continued to disregard his own CIA assessment. Adam Schiff, the top Democrat on the House intelligence committee, who was briefed by the CIA on the assessment stated that President Trump was lying about the CIA findings. Under mounting pressure from lawmakers who wanted action against KSA, Secretary of State Mike Pompeo and Defense Secretary Jim Mattis, in a rare closed briefing addressing the Senate, declared there was no direct evidence linking the crown prince to the Khashoggi's assassination. Many lawmakers were furious that CIA Director Gina Haspel, the only Trump cabinet member who listened to the audio recordings of the assassination in Istanbul, did not participate in the briefing, as they had requested.

After a small group of bipartisan senators were briefed by CIA Director Haspel on 4 December 2018, their takeaway was dramatically different from that of the administration. Even leading Republican senators distanced themselves from President Trump and stated they are certain that Mohammed bin Salman indeed ordered the assassination. Bob Corker, the Republican chair of the Senate foreign relations committee, affirmed immediately after the Haspel briefing: "I have zero question in my mind that the crown prince ordered the killing, monitored the killing, knew exactly what was happening. If he was in front of a jury, he would be convicted in 30 minutes. Guilty. So the question is, 'What do we do about that?'". Republican senator Lindsey Graham, a close ally of President Trump, emerged from the Haspel briefing more convinced than ever that Mohammed bin Salman was "complicit". He told reporters on Capitol Hill that "there's not a smoking gun, there's a smoking saw", in reference to the medical device the Saudi kill team allegedly used to dismember Khashoggi. He acknowledged: "The crown prince is a wrecking ball. I think he's complicit in the murder of Mr. Khashoggi to the highest level possible. I think his behavior before the Khashoggi murder was beyond disturbing. And I cannot see him being a reliable partner to the United States. If the Saudi government is going to be in the hands of this man for a long time to come, I find it very difficult to be able to do business because I think he's crazy, I think he is dangerous."

A former Saudi intelligence chief and senior member of the Saudi royal family Prince, Turki bin Faisal Al Saud, dismissed the CIA's finding that Khashoggi's murder was ordered directly by Mohammed bin Salman, saying that "The CIA has been proved wrong before. Just to mention the invasion of Iraq for example. The CIA is not necessarily the best measure of creditable intelligence reporting or intelligence assessment."

=== President Biden ===
Since taking office President Biden also did not take any action against Saudi Arabia.

== United Nations ==
On 18 October 2018 at a press conference at the United Nations four major human rights groups demanded an independent UN investigation into Khashoggi's assassination. The Committee to Protect Journalists (CPJ), Amnesty International (AI), Human Rights Watch (HRW), and Reporters Without Borders (RSF) called on Secretary-General of the United Nations António Guterres to appoint an investigator. The UN team should be allowed full access to any sites and allowed to interview witnesses or suspects without interference. KSA should immediately waive diplomatic protections and Turkey should turn over all evidence in its possession, including audio and visual records that Turkish officials have claimed reveal Khashoggi's murder. AI's head of the New York office, Sherine Tadros, pointed to Saudi Arabia's human rights record: "This incident didn't happen in a vacuum. Jamal Khashoggi is not one case that is an anomaly. It happened in a context of an increased crackdown on dissent since June 2017 when the crown prince Mohammed Bin Salman took his position."

CPJ's Deputy Executive Director Robert Mahoney said at the press conference: "This sends an incredibly chilling signal to journalists around the world that their lives don't matter and that states can have you murdered with impunity." "UN involvement is the best guarantee against a Saudi whitewash or attempts by other governments to sweep the issue under the carpet to preserve lucrative business ties with Riyadh."

Louis Charbonneau, the UN Director at HRW, said: "If in fact it's true, that the most senior members of the Saudi government were behind the execution and dismemberment of Mr. Khashoggi, then we don't want the culprits investigating themselves." "Only the UN has the credibility and independence required to expose the masterminds behind Khashoggi's enforced disappearance and to hold them accountable."

United Nations High Commissioner for Human Rights, Michelle Bachelet also urged Saudi Arabia to reveal the location of Khashoggi's body.

Christophe Deloire, Secretary-General of RSF, wrote: "Any attempt to get rid of the pressure on Saudi Arabia and to accept a compromise policy would result in giving a 'license to kill' to a Kingdom that puts in jail, lashes, kidnaps and even kills journalists who dare to investigate and launch debates".

Amnesty, the CPJ, HRW and RSF stated that the Saudi-Turkish investigation group will be unable to make progress in the face of KSA's denials of any involvement.

On 19 October 2018 Secretary-General of the United Nations António Guterres released an official statement saying that the confirmation of Khashoggi's death "deeply troubled" him, and emphasized the need for a full investigation into the circumstances.

Between 28 January and 3 February 2019 UN Special Rapporteur Agnès Callamard, who is leading an international human rights inquiry into the murder, visited Turkey. The preliminary report on the inquiry, published on 7 February, concluded that Khashoggi "was the victim of a brutal and premeditated killing, planned and perpetrated by officials of the State of Saudi Arabia". The full report, released on 19 June, further affirmed these conclusions, also tying the Crown Prince, Mohammad bin Salman, to the assassination.

== Canada ==
Prime Minister Justin Trudeau has said that he has "real concerns" about the disappearance of Khashoggi. Foreign Affairs Minister Chrystia Freeland "reaffirmed (Canada's) commitment to defending freedom of expression and protection of the free press" and raised the issue directly with her Saudi counterpart, calling for "a thorough, credible and transparent investigation into the serious allegations about Mr. Kashoggi's disappearance." She added that "Canada remains very troubled by (his) disappearance."

On 22 October, after preliminary findings of the Saudi investigation emerged, Global Affairs Canada said "The explanations offered to date lack consistency and credibility." It reiterated Canada's condemnation of the killing and condolence to the family and urged investigators to work with Turkey toward justice.

When asked about a pending sale of 742 Light Armoured Vehicles to Saudi Arabia in light of Khashoggi's death and the Yemeni war during question period in Parliament on 22 October, Trudeau said: "We have frozen export permits before when we had concerns about their potential misuse and we will not hesitate to do so again." The contract, with London, Ontario's General Dynamics Land Systems Canada, is estimated at $15 billion. However, Canada will be respecting the export permits that have already been issued. Canadian ministers and embassy staff had skipped attending the business summit in Riyadh due to the incident.

At the request of Prime Minister Trudeau spy chief David Vigneault departed for Turkey to work on the investigation. Vigneault, the director of the Canadian Security Intelligence Service, listened to the recording of the Turkish authorities of Khashoggi's assassination and upon his return provided a briefings to Trudeau as well as other Canadian officials.

Joint statement

- On 24 October, Trudeau had a telephone conversation with German Chancellor Merkel after which they released a joint statement reaffirming "their shared commitment to freedom of the press". Both leaders "strongly agreed on the need for transparency and accountability for those who committed this act".

The foreign ministers of the Group of Seven (G7) nations called for a thorough and credible investigation, saying Saudi Arabia must ensure such an incident could never happen again.

== Europe ==
- European Union: On 13 October, the European Union requested a detailed investigation of the incident. On 20 October the High Representative of the Union for Foreign Affairs and Security Policy Federica Mogherini issued a formal statement saying: "The emerging circumstances of Jamal Khashoggi's death are deeply troubling, including the shocking violation of the 1963 Vienna Convention on Consular Relations and particularly Article 55 ... Therefore the European Union, like its partners, insists on the need for continued thorough, credible and transparent investigation, shedding proper clarity on the circumstances of the killing and ensuring full accountability of all those responsible for it."
- Austria: Foreign Minister Karin Kneissl described the case as "profoundly shocking" and an unprecedented violation of the law and said that the European Union should halt arms sales to Saudi Arabia.
- France requested a detailed investigation of the incident on 13 October. On 26 October, French president Emmanuel Macron declared that he did not want to reconsider weapon sells to Riyad, stating "It will be pure demagogy to stop selling weapons" to Riyad as a response to the assassination of Jamal Khashoggi.
- Germany: Norbert Röttgen, chairman of the German parliamentary foreign affairs committee, criticized Donald Trump's comments supporting Prince bin Salman: "The decisive factor now is the behaviour of the U.S. president, who basically told the crown prince, we are giving you free rein as long as you buy enough weapons and other things from us."

Germany described the Saudi explanation for the killing as "inadequate", and suggested that arms sales to Saudi Arabia be halted by all countries. On 21 October, German Chancellor Angela Merkel rejected the Saudi statement that confirmed the killing and called for transparency and accountability in the case. She stated that Germany will not export arms to Saudi Arabia until the questions related to the case are resolved, and the persons responsible in the case are held accountable. On 25 October Chancellor Merkel had a phone conversation with King Salman in which she repeated these concerns. On 19 November 2018 Germany halted all arms sales to Saudi Arabia, even those that had been previously approved.

- Norway: Despite political divisions as to how to respond to the killing, the government of Norway agreed that the Saudi explanation was "ridiculous". In the beginning of November, Norwegian Foreign Minister Ine Eriksen Soereide spoke to the Saudi ambassador to condemn the killing. On 9 November, Norway became the second country after Germany to stop the sale of arms to Saudi Arabia.
- Russia: Russian President Vladimir Putin stated that Russia "cannot start deteriorating relations" with Saudi Arabia because "it did not know what really happened" and "the journalist that disappeared lived in the US. In this sense, of course, the US holds a certain responsibility over what happened to him." Kremlin spokesman Dmitry Peskov confirmed this reflected Russia's official position, and further, that there was no reason to disbelieve the Saudi statement. Russian Foreign Minister Sergey Lavrov said that Russia hopes the results of the joint Turkish-Saudi investigation will be made public. Russian envoys to Indonesia and the United Kingdom stated the American and British response to the disappearance of Khashoggi demonstrates London's and Washington's double standards toward Russia and other countries.
- Spain: Spain's Prime Minister Pedro Sanchez defended the decision to continue arms sales to Saudi Arabia and insisted on his government's "responsibility" to protect jobs in the arms industry. The foreign ministry said it was also "upset" by the statements of Saudi Arabia regarding the killing of Khashoggi, according to a written statement from Spain's Ankara Embassy on Monday. The statement said the perpetrators of the incident should pay the price of it before justice "after a wide-scoped and transparent investigation" and also offers their condolences to Khashoggi's family. Podemos party and Catalan pro-independence parties criticized links between Spanish royal family and Saudi Arabia.
- United Kingdom: Foreign Secretary Jeremy Hunt met the Saudi ambassador and warned Saudi Arabia that the long-term friendship between the UK and Saudi Arabia depends on "shared values". Hunt rejected calls to end weapons sales, saying: "There are jobs in the UK ... at stake so when it comes to the issue of arms sales we have our procedures." The Labour Party's Shadow First Secretary of State, Emily Thornberry, criticized Theresa May's government's response to Khashoggi's disappearance as 'too little, too late'. Thornberry was critical of UK-Saudi relations, saying: "Imagine how this government would have reacted if either Russia or Iran had abducted – and in all likelihood murdered – one of their dissident journalists within the sovereign territory of another country."

The Labour Party's leader Jeremy Corbyn and Shadow Secretary of State for International Trade Barry Gardiner called for the suspension of UK arms sales to Saudi Arabia.
The British Foreign Secretary Jeremy Hunt paid an official visit to KSA and called for its cooperation with a "credible" investigation into Khashoggi's killing. Corbyn also called for an international investigation into the murder of Khashoggi and Saudi's war crimes in Yemen. Liberal Democrats leader Vince Cable said: "This situation gets murkier and murkier. The Government should have already suspended arms export licences to Saudi Arabia given the outrages in Yemen. This reinforces the argument for loosening the bonds to the regime."

On 19 October diplomat and former chief of the Secret Intelligence Service (MI6), John Sawers, told the BBC that all the evidence suggested crown prince Mohammed bin Salman was behind the death of Khashoggi, and that the theory that rogue elements in the Saudi military were responsible was "blatant fiction". He stated he did not believe the crown prince Mohammed would have acted in the way he did unless he believed he had been given "licence" to do so by the US administration of Donald Trump: "I think President Trump and his ministerial team are waking up to just how dangerous it is to have people acting with a sense that they have impunity in their relationship with the United States."

British foreign minister Hunt, spoke to his Saudi counterpart Adel al-Jubeir, on 21 October to convey the British view that the explanation provided was not entirely credible. On 23 October 2018 Hunt wrote he was "deeply concerned" to hear Erdoğan's describe Khashoggi's murder as "premeditated": "The world is still waiting for answers".

On 30 September 2019 an edition of the BBC's Panorama programme investigated the case and included interviews with some of the few people who had listened to covert recordings from inside the diplomatic building.

Joint statements

- : On 21 October responding to the statement from Saudi Arabia confirming the death of Khashoggi in a fist fight, France, Germany and the UK issued a joint statement expressing shock and condemning the killing of Khashoggi, saying there is an "urgent need for clarification of exactly what happened". On 19 November 2018 the Schengen zone, which includes most EU countries and non-EU members Norway and Switzerland, with the UK imposed travel bans on 18 Saudi nationals allegedly implicated in Khashoggi's assassination.

== Arab world ==
Al Jazeera reported on 13 October that "the Arab world stays silent... there's been no official reaction from any Arab government, and hardly any condemnation from Arab media." Another news outlet, Middle East Eye, reported on 15 October that "Largely silent until Sunday, Arab leaders come out publicly in support of the kingdom after US President Donald Trump threatens 'severe punishment'."

- Arab League: On 14 October, the Arab League denounced any political pressure applied on Saudi Arabia and stated in an official response "It is totally unacceptable, in the context of relations between countries, to wave economic sanctions as a policy or tool to achieve political goals."
- Bahrain: The foreign ministry released a statement that Saudi Arabia is "the essential foundation for the security and stability of the Arab and Islamic worlds and the solid foundation and strong pillar of stability in the region".
- Egypt: Ahmed Hafidh, a foreign ministry spokesman, said that "Egypt reaffirms its support for the kingdom in its efforts and positions dealing with this event."
- Djibouti: The Republic of Djibouti expressed its full solidarity with the brotherly Kingdom and condemned the media campaign against Saudi Arabia.
- Lebanon: Prime Minister Saad Hariri, who himself was in 2017 allegedly kidnapped and forced to resign in Saudi Arabia, said in a statement that he stood in solidarity with Saudi Arabia "in the face of the campaigns targeting it". According to Rami George Khouri, a professor of journalism at the American University of Beirut, "The case of Jamal Khashoggi, unfortunately, is only the tip of the iceberg... it would only be the most dramatic example of a trend that has been ongoing for at least 30 to 40 years, but which has escalated under [Saudi crown prince Mohammad bin Salman]".
  - Hezbollah: Hezbollah leader, Hassan Nasrallah said in a speech: "I tell the Saudi rulers that now is the right time to take a bold and brave stance and stop the war on Yemen... The international cover for their war on Yemen has started to crumble, especially after Khashoggi incident. The kingdom's image in the world has never been worse throughout 100 years."
- Jordan: Information Minister Jumana Ghunaimat said in a press statement that Jordan stands with Saudi Arabia in the face of any rumors and campaigns aimed at it without relying on facts.
- Kuwait: "Kuwait stands in opposition against all the accusation and unlawful campaigns targeting the Kingdom of Saudi Arabia in relation to the case of journalist Jamal Khashoggi", said a statement by the Kuwaiti cabinet on 15 October. On 24 October Kuwait's Deputy Foreign Minister Khaled al-Jarallah reiterated Kuwait support of Saudi Arabia. "So we support our brothers in the Kingdom, and denounce the unjust campaign and slander it's being subjected to", he said.
- Mauritania: Mauritanian Ministry of Foreign Affairs issued a statement in which "confirmed the deep relations binding it with the Kingdom of Saudi Arabia, describing them as brotherly and well-established and strongly condemned a campaign of malicious allegations against Saudi Arabia". The Islamic Republic confirmed "its confidence in the Saudi judiciary and its ability and willingness to reach the disclosure of all the circumstances surrounding the incident, and hold those involved accountable".
- Morocco: Morocco was one of the few Arab countries that did not come out in support of KSA over the assassination of Khashoggi. On 27 November 2018 king Mohammed VI declined Mohammed bin Salman an audience. The country requested to indefinitely postpone the 13th meeting of the Moroccan-Saudi Joint Committee meeting.
- Oman: "The Sultanate has followed the statement given by the brotherly Kingdom of Saudi Arabia regarding preliminary results of the tragic incident that occurred with citizen Jamal Khashoggi, may he rest in peace, and the Sultanate welcomes the transparency of the kingdom's procedures in the matter", Oman's Ministry of Foreign Affairs said in a statement on 21 October.
- Palestine: President Mahmoud Abbas said in a statement that "Palestine was – and shall remain – on the side of Saudi Arabia."
- Qatar: Spokesperson for the Ministry of Foreign Affairs Lolwah Rashid al-Khater said that the murder of Jamal Khashoggi should act as a wake-up call: "No matter how much we tried to explain, somehow it was not going through, but now especially after this spat with Canada, and before that with [the kidnapping of] the Lebanese prime minister, people started realizing that this has become a pattern somehow and they started understanding what we have been going through. And that's why I'm saying [the Khashoggi case] is a wake-up call for everyone."

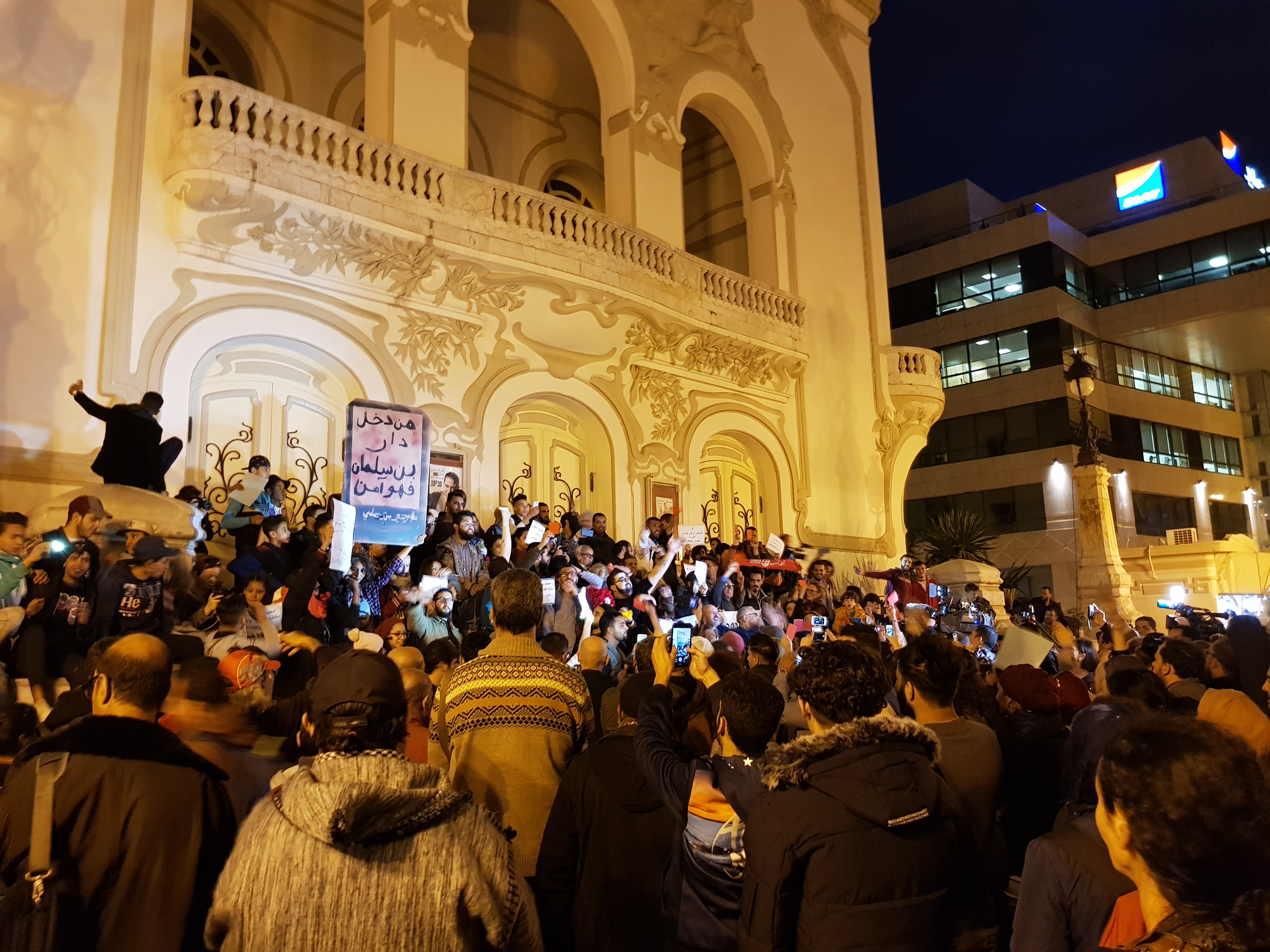
Protest in Tunis against the visit of Mohammed bin Salman, 26 November 2018

- Tunisia: On 26 and 27 November 2018, amid Mohammed bin Salman's first trip abroad after he was accused of ordering the assassination of Khashoggi, he encountered public anger while his visit in Tunis. Protests were accompanied by statements from Tunisian unions and a dozen civil society groups decrying crown prince Mohammed's visit as an "attack on the principles" of the Arab Spring that bought democracy and freedom of expression to Tunisia. Since the Arab Spring movement began in late 2010 in Tunisia, which unseated entrenched rulers in the region, Tunisia had undergone a democratic transition and is one of the few Arab countries to allow demonstrations. These were the first protests in the Arab world against Saudi Arabia's crown prince Mohammed bin Salman.

Activists had tried to have a court bar him from entering Tunisia. At the National Syndicate of Tunisian Journalists headquarters a giant banner depicted a cartoon of Mohammed bin Salman with a chainsaw and inscription reading "No to the desecration of Tunisia, the land of the revolution". The Secretary General of the National Union of Journalists, Soukaina Abdessamad, said that for a country like Tunisia striving towards democracy, it is unacceptable to receive a "dubious Crown Prince". The demonstrators shouted "Go away assassin!" and held placards showing crown prince Mohammed and US President Donald Trump holding Khashoggi.

- United Arab Emirates: Minister of State for Foreign Affairs Anwar Gargash advised against destabilizing and politically targeting Saudi Arabia and the effect it may cause in the region and tweeted "the repercussions of the political targeting of Saudi Arabia will be dire for those who fuel it. It remains that the success of Saudi Arabia is what the region and its people want." The UAE government later commended the admission of Khashoggi's death from Saudi Arabia and the actions of apprehending those responsible and bringing them to justice.
- Yemen: President Abdrabbuh Mansur Hadi, who has been living in exile in Saudi Arabia since 2015, said that "The cheap political and media targeting of Saudi Arabia will not deter it from continuing its leading role in the Arab and Islamic worlds."

== Africa ==
- South Africa: The South African Government "welcomes the ongoing diplomatic interaction between the Republic of Turkey and the Kingdom of Saudi Arabia, as well as the investigation which seeks to get to the bottom of this matter."

== Asia ==
- China: Hua Chunying, spokeswoman of China's Foreign Ministry, said that the killing "is an unfortunate incident" and should be investigated properly.
- Indonesia: President Joko Widodo said he was "deeply concerned" about the killing of Khashoggi and that he wanted a transparent investigation. Widodo met with Saudi Foreign Minister Adel al-Jubeir at the presidential palace in the West Java city of Bogor. Widodo's concerns were relayed by Indonesia's foreign minister following the meeting. The minister, Retno Marsudi, told reporters that "the president is deeply concerned with the Khashoggi case and Indonesia hopes that the ongoing investigation will be transparent and meticulous."
- Iran: President Hassan Rouhani said that Saudi Arabia would not have murdered prominent journalist Jamal Khashoggi without American protection: "Nobody would imagine that in today's world, we witness such an organised murder and I don't think without getting support from the United States a country would dare to commit such a crime" Iranian Foreign Minister Mohammad Javad Zarif accused the United States Department of the Treasury of announcing new sanctions on Iran to "deflect" attention from the killing of the journalist. Parliament's General Director for International Affairs Hossein Amir-Abdollahian stressed that Saudi Arabia as a violator of human rights must be dropped from the UN Human Rights Council. Member of parliament Alaeddin Boroujerdi said that Saudi leadership should face trial before international tribunal for their alleged role in the crime. Grand Ayatollah Naser Makarem Shirazi said: "the murder of the journalist by the Western-backed al-Saud family proves that claims of respect for human rights by the West are just a mirage."
- Israel: Prime Minister Benjamin Netanyahu said the killing was "horrendous and it should be duly dealt with", whilst arguing that "it is very important for the stability of the region and the world that Saudi Arabia remain stable", and a balance should be struck between these two things to counter the "larger problem" of Iran. The Israeli Ambassador to the United States, Ron Dermer, accused Turkey and Qatar of "pressing hard to ruin relationships with Saudi Arabia" and emphasized the importance of the Saudi-U.S. "strategic relationship".
- Japan: Chief Cabinet Secretary Yoshihide Suga told a press conference that the death of Jamal Khashoggi is "extremely regretful", according to Japanese news agency Kyodo. Suga stated that Japan "strongly hopes for an early discovery of the truth and fair, transparent responses" through Turkey's investigation of the case.
- Malaysia: Prime Minister, Mahathir Mohamad said that the killing of Saudi journalist Jamal Khashoggi was an act of "extreme cruelty" and was unacceptable. Malaysia, he said, does not support the killing of government critics, continuing: "This is extreme cruelty, and it is not acceptable. We too have people that we do not like, but we don't kill them."
- Pakistan: Prime Minister Imran Khan has stated that despite the murder, Pakistan must prioritize good relations with Saudi Arabia due to an economic crisis. He also added that U.S. sanctions against Iran are affecting neighboring Pakistan, stating "The last thing the Muslim World needs is another conflict. The Trump administration is moving towards that direction." Muhammad bin Salman conducted a state visit to Pakistan in February 2019 to beef up the relations. During this visit journalists who changed their display pictures on social media to a photograph of Jamal Khashoggi were monitored and investigated by the Federal Investigation Agency for Cyber Crimes. It was later revealed that the government sent officials to various media outlets to prescribe the rules of engagement for journalists that had to be obeyed to the letter.

== Oceania ==
- Australia: Prime Minister Scott Morrison condemned the death and announced that Australian diplomats would not attend the business summit in Riyadh later that year. He stated "We deplore the killing of Jamal Khashoggi. We expect the Saudi government to cooperate fully with Turkish authorities regarding the investigation of this matter. Australia will stand with all other like-minded countries in condemning this death, this killing, and we expect there to be full cooperation. Those who have been arrested will go through the proper process. And we expect the truth to be determined through that process and those responsible to be held accountable."
- New Zealand: The Government of New Zealand officially condemned the killing. In a statement, Minister of Foreign Affairs Winston Peters said, "With the confirmation of the death we express our deepest condolences to Mr. Khashoggi's family and friends. Those responsible for his death must be held accountable." In the same statement, Trade Minister David Parker announced that New Zealand would not be taking part in the Future Investment Initiative in Riyadh.

== South America ==
- Argentina: In the run-up to the G20 summit in Buenos Aires, on 30 November – 1 December 2018, where Mohammed Bin Salman's attendance was scheduled, Argentine prosecutorial authorities were urged to take action against him. The Constitution of Argentina recognizes the principal of universal jurisdiction for war crimes and torture and on this basis the Spanish judge Baltasar Garzón had been able to order the arrest of the US-backed Chilean dictator Augusto Pinochet in London in 1998. On 26 November 2018 the federal judge in Buenos Aires, Ariel Lijo, accepted the writ presented by the advocacy group Human Rights Watch (HRW). Federal prosecutor Ramiro González began examining Bin Salman's role in crimes against humanity in the Saudi Arabian-led intervention in Yemen, for which he may face criminal liability due to his role as Saudi defence minister, allegations that women's rights activists have been tortured by the Saudi regime with electrocution and flogging, and his involvement in Khashoggi's assassination, which western intelligence agencies, including the CIA, had concluded he ordered.

Judge Ariel Lijo formally requested the Foreign Ministry of Argentina on 29 November 2018 to seek information from Turkey, Yemen and the International Criminal Court in The Hague. He also asked for the foreign ministry to provide information about Mohammed Bin Salman's diplomatic status and immunity.

== Commercial interests ==
British business magnate Richard Branson issued a statement on 11 October that he was suspending his advisory role for the two Saudi Vision 2030-related projects he is involved with amidst the Khashoggi controversy.

Masayoshi Son, leader of Japanese IT and software conglomerate SoftBank Group, which has been a large conduit for high-tech investments of the Saudi Crown Prince, pulled out of his scheduled speech at the Future Investment Initiative (FII) business summit, which is in its second year. JPMorgan Chase CEO Jamie Dimon, BlackRock CEO Larry Fink, The Blackstone Group CEO Stephen Schwarzman, Google Cloud Chief Executive Diane Greene, Viacom CEO Robert Bakish, Uber CEO Dara Khosrowshahi, AOL co-founder Steve Case, Richard Branson's Virgin Group, World Bank President Jim Yong Kim, the Financial Times, Bloomberg, CNN, The New York Times, The Economist, CNBC, Brookfield Asset Management, Canada Pension Plan Investment Board, and Ford Motor chairman Bill Ford all withdrew their participation in the FII summit. Y Combinator CEO Sam Altman announced that he is suspending his "involvement with the NEOM advisory board until the facts regarding Jamal Khashoggi's disappearance are known". Siemens CEO Joe Kaeser pulled out the day before conference start.

The French finance minister Bruno Le Maire, Dutch finance minister Wopke Hoekstra, British Secretary of State for International Trade Liam Fox, United States Secretary of the Treasury Steven Mnuchin, and International Monetary Fund managing director Christine Lagarde withdrew their participation in the FII conference as well. The Government of Canada has also indicated that they have no intention of sending anyone to the conference.

Bahrain's foreign minister Khalid bin Ahmed Al Khalifa called for a boycott of Uber in Bahrain and Saudi Arabia, urging to "boycott anyone who boycotts Saudi Arabia". The Public Investment Fund of Saudi Arabia invested $3.5 billion in Uber in 2016.

Four American senators, including two members of the Committee on Foreign Relations, urged professional wrestling company WWE (which is owned by Vince McMahon, the husband of then-Administrator of the Small Business Administration Linda McMahon) to reconsider its business relationship with Saudi Arabia, and particularly their Crown Jewel event. Knox County Mayor Glenn Jacobs, who wrestles for WWE under the ring name Kane, took part in the show as scheduled. His spokesman said: "Mayor Jacobs won't speculate on Mr. Khashoggi's disappearance. However, he and his family are in the mayor's thoughts and prayers." After briefly removing ticket and venue information from its website, WWE announced on 25 October that the Crown Jewel event would go on as planned, and the show aired on 2 November.

Khashoggi wrote on Twitter before his murder: "What has happened to us? How can someone like Dr. Walid Fitahi be arrested and what are the justifications for it? Of course, everyone is in a state of confusion and helplessness, there is no one you can go to, no public prosecutor has questioned. God help us." Ritz-Carlton hotel was used to hold many of the prominent prisoners by the Saudi government in 2017, according to Saudi activists. Aljazeera reported, Dr.Fitaihi told a friend he was "blindfolded, stripped of his underwear and bound to a chair". Also, the daily report said, The Saudi government tortured him with electricity shocking "what appears to have been a single session of torture that lasted about an hour". Reports also said, he was whipped so severely, he could not sleep on his back for days.

On 18 October, Twitter suspended a number of suspected bot accounts constructed to support Mohammed bin Salman and appearing to smear Khashoggi.

Bill & Melinda Gates Foundation has stopped its cooperation with nonprofit MiSK Foundation chaired by Saudi crown prince Mohammad bin Salman. BMGF had pledged $5 million to MiSk but has cancelled most of it, calling the murder "extremely troubling".

A number of leading bankers and financial sponsors of the Mohammed bin Salman Regime—including Jamie Dimon, chief executive of JPMorgan Chase, who had boycotted the Future Investments Initiative on the grounds that his bank "couldn't be seen in any way [to be] condoning" Khashoggi's murder—quietly continued negotiations in the months following the killing as part of a long-planned bond sale benefitting Aramco, the world's most profitable company, taking in more than $100 billion in bond orders, and achieving success for the state-owned company by ultimately issuing $12 billion in new debt as part of one of the most oversubscribed bond offers in Wall Street history. Morgan Stanley, HSBC, and Goldman Sachs were among the banks participating in the bond sale which had participated in the "boycott" of Mohammed bin Salman's "Davos in the Desert" conference immediately following Khashoggi's consulate assassination and dismemberment. Asked for an explanation of the apparent turnaround, JP Morgan spokesman Andrew Gray explained: “We do business all over the world and stick with companies and countries in good times and bad and ultimately, we are serving the citizens of any nation where we do business and want to engage and help bring people up.”
