= 2022 Burkina Faso coup d'état =

2022 Burkina Faso coup d'état may refer to:

- January 2022 Burkina Faso coup d'état
- September 2022 Burkina Faso coup d'état
