= Population decline =

Concept in human demographics

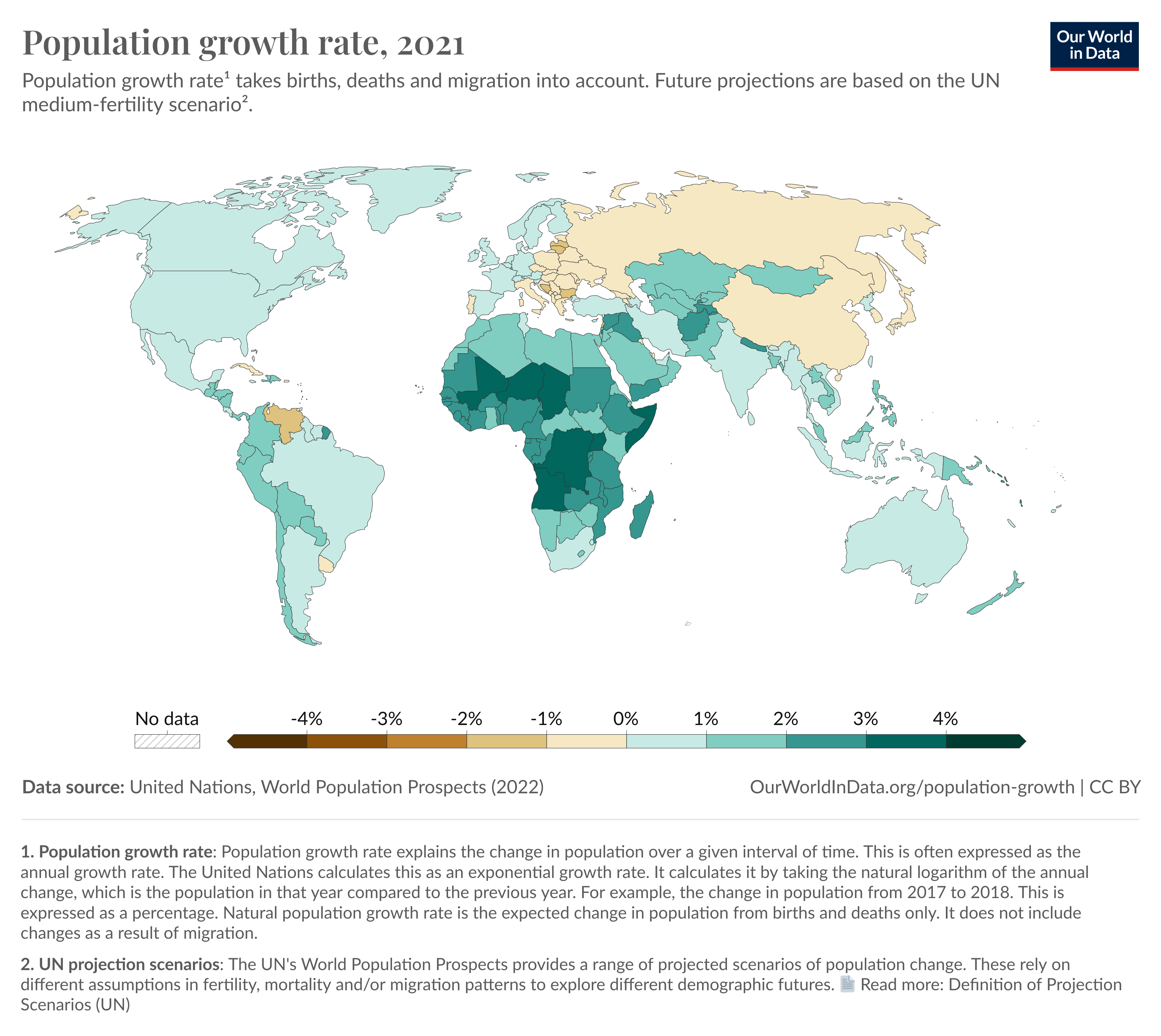
Global rates of population growth and decline (2021–2022); population growth rate takes birth, death, and migration rates into account. Future projections are based on the United Nations World Population Prospects (from 1950 until 2100).

Population decline, also known as depopulation, is a reduction in a human population size. Earth's total human population continues to grow, as it has done throughout history, but projections suggest this long-term trend may be coming to an end. From antiquity (10th century BCE–500 CE) until the beginning of the Industrial Revolution in early modern Europe (late 18th–early 19th centuries), the global population grew very slowly, at about 0.04% per year. After about 1800 the growth rate accelerated to a peak of 2.1% annually during the mid-20th-century baby boom (1945–1968 period), but since then, due to the worldwide collapse of the total fertility rate, it has slowed to 0.9% as of 2023. The global growth rate in absolute numbers accelerated to a peak of 92.8 million in 1990, but has since slowed to 70.4 million in 2023.

Long-term projections indicate that the growth rate of the human population on the planet will continue to slow down, and that before the end of the 21st century it will reach growth zero. Examples of this emerging trend are Japan, whose population is currently (2023) declining at the rate of 0.5% per year, and China, whose population has peaked and is currently (2023) declining at the rate of about 0.2% per year. By 2050, Europe's population is projected to be declining at the rate of 0.3% per year. Population growth has declined mainly due to the abrupt decline in the global total fertility rate, from 5.3 in 1963 to 2.2 in 2023. The decline in the total fertility rate has occurred in every region of the world and is a result of a process known as demographic transition. To maintain its population, ignoring migration, a country on average requires a minimum fertility rate of 2.2 children per woman of childbearing age (the number is slightly greater than two because not all children live to adulthood). However, most societies experience a drop in fertility to well below two as they grow wealthier.

Birth dearth, a closely related demographic phenomenon which refers to the declining fertility rates observed in many modern industrialized, affluent societies, affects countries and geographic regions that are currently experiencing the highest rates of declining populations, such as Western Europe, Japan, the Russian Federation, and South Korea. Populations in other industrialized countries, such as the United Kingdom and the United States, and developing, poorer regions of the world, including the Balkans, Central Asia, the Middle East, and Sub-Saharan Africa, are also being impacted. For instance, the tendency of women in wealthier countries to have fewer children is attributed to a variety of reasons, such as lower infant mortality and a reduced need for children as a source of family labor or retirement welfare, both of which reduce the incentive to have many children. Better access to education for young women, which broadens their job prospects, is also often cited by some demographers, journalists, and political economists.

Possible consequences of long-term national population decline can be net positive or negative, both on world economy and individual countries themselves. If a country can increase its workforce productivity faster than its population decline, the results, in terms of its national economy, the quality of life of its citizens, and the environment, can be net positive. If it cannot increase workforce productivity faster than its population decline, the results can be negative. So far, national efforts to confront a declining population to date have been focused on the possible negative economic consequences and have been centered on increasing the size and productivity of the workforce through various means.

== Causes ==
A reduction over time in a region's population can be caused by sudden, adverse events such as economic crises, outbursts of infectious diseases, climate change, famines, poverty, war, existential risks due to social and economic inequalities, and wealth disparities; long-term demographic trends such as birth dearth, sub-replacement fertility, persistently low birth rates, high mortality rates, increase of drug abuse, violent crimes, and political violence; continued emigration of native citizens to foreign countries; persistent and unresolved societal issues, including low fertility rates, lack of cohabitation and/or domestic partnership between spouses, declining marriage rates, increase of annulment and divorce cases, marital abuse, abandonment of children, childbirth by a single person or single-person adoption; and lifestyle choices associated with being single, urbanization, individualism, celibacy, social isolation, unemployment, and voluntary childlessness.

=== Short-term population shocks ===
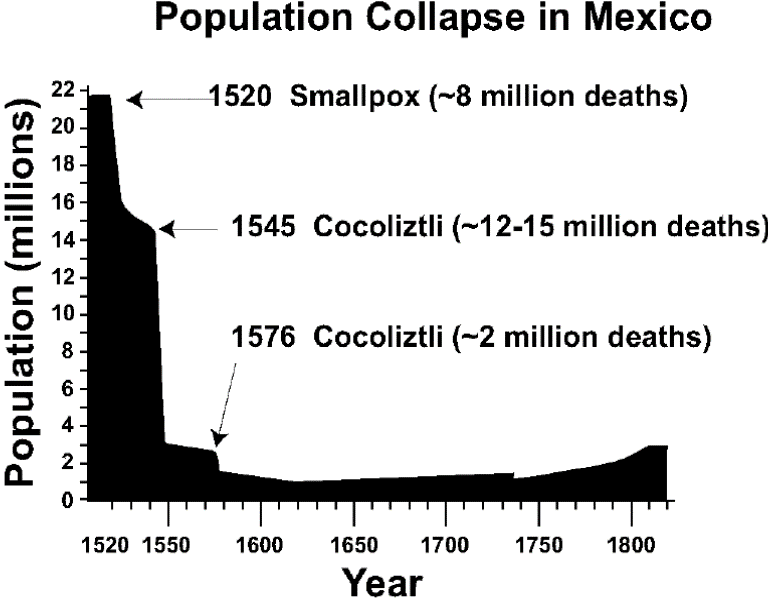
Population collapse in the history of Mexico (16th–17th centuries), attributed to repeated epidemics of smallpox and cocoliztli viruses. The viral outbreaks were caused by the Spanish invasion and colonization of Central America. (See also: History of smallpox in Mexico).

Historical episodes of short-term human population decline have been common and they have been caused by several factors.

High mortality rates caused by:

- Disease: for example, the Black Death that devastated Eurasia (14th–17th centuries), the arrival and spread of Old World diseases in the Americas during the European colonization (late 15th–19th centuries), and the Spanish flu pandemic in the aftermath of World War I (1918–1920);
- Drug epidemic: for example, the current opioid epidemic in the United States that began in the late 1990s, according to the Centers for Disease Control and Prevention (CDC).
- Famine: for example, the Great Irish Famine caused by the infection of potato crops by the blight in British-ruled Ireland (1845–1852), and the Great Chinese Famine caused by the Great Leap Forward in communist China (1958–1962); the former caused the Irish population to decline by 20–25% between 1841 and 1871, while the latter caused approximately 25 millions of deaths among the Chinese people and is considered to be the largest or second-largest famine in recorded history.
- War: for example, the devastating consequences of the Mongol invasion of Central and Eastern Europe during the Late Middle Ages (13th century), which may have reduced the population of medieval Hungary by 20–40%;
- Social unrest: for example, the displacement and forced migration of millions of Syrian citizens caused by the Syrian Civil War (2011–2024), the inception of an ongoing, international humanitarian crisis;
- A combination of these: the first half of the 20th century in Imperial Russia and the Soviet Union was marked by a succession of major wars, alongside famines and natural disasters, which caused large-scale population losses (approximately 60 million excess deaths).

Some population declines result from indeterminate causes, such as the Late Bronze Age collapse (12th century BCE), a period of societal collapse in the Mediterranean basin which has been described as the worst disaster in ancient history. More frequently, short-term population declines are caused by warfare, famines, and large-scale epidemics, such as the Great Irish Famine (1845–1852), whose proximate cause for the famine was the infection of potato crops by the blight throughout Europe during the 1840s. Impact on food supply by the blight infection caused 100,000 deaths outside Ireland, and influenced much of the social unrest that culminated in the Revolutions of 1848. The famine and its effects permanently changed the island's demographic, political, and cultural landscape, producing an estimated 2 million refugees and spurring a century-long population decline.

Less frequently, short-term population declines are caused by genocide and/or ethnic cleansing. For example, during the early 20th century, the percentage of Christians in the Middle East mainly fell as a result of the late Ottoman genocides: the Armenian, Greek, and Assyrian genocides which were committed by the Ottoman Turks and their allies, which caused millions of deaths and forced the surviving Christian populations to flee and emigrate to Iraq, Syria, North America, and Western Europe (1910s–1920s). It has been estimated that the Holocaust and other industrial-scale genocides which Nazi Germany perpetrated against European Jews, Romani people, Poles, Serbs, German citizens with disabilities, and many other groups caused more than 13 million deaths in Nazi-occupied Europe during World War II (1939–1945), while the population of Cambodia declined by 25% (1.5 to 2 million deaths) due to the Cambodian genocide, the large-scale executions which were carried out by the Khmer Rouge (1975–1979).

In the contemporary world, the AIDS pandemic, originated by the emergence and spread of the human immunodeficiency virus (HIV), and the COVID-19 pandemic, originated by the emergence and spread of the severe acute respiratory syndrome-related coronavirus (SARS-CoV-2), have caused short-term drops in fertility and significant excess mortality in a number of countries.

=== Long-term historic trends in world population growth ===
Map of countries by total fertility rate (2022–2023), referring to the average number of children that are born to a woman over her lifetime, according to the Population Reference Bureau.

In spite of these short-term population shocks, world population has continued to grow. From around the 10th century BCE to the beginning of the early modern period (15th–19th centuries CE), world population grew very slowly, around 0.04% per year. During that period, population growth was governed by conditions now labeled the "Malthusian trap".

After 1800, driven by increases in human productivity due to the Industrial Revolution, particularly the increase in agricultural productivity, population growth accelerated to around 0.6% per year, a rate that was over ten times the rate of population growth of the previous 12,000 years. This rapid increase in global population caused Malthus and others to raise the first concerns about overpopulation.

In the aftermath of World War I, birth rates in the United States and many European countries fell below replacement level. This prompted concern about population decline. The recovery of the birth rate in most Western countries around 1940 that produced the "baby boom", with annual growth rates in the 1.0 – 1.5% range, and which peaked during the period 1962–1968 at 2.1% per year, temporarily dispelled prior concerns about population decline, and the world was once again fearful of overpopulation. After 1968, the global population growth rate started a long decline. The Population Division of the United Nations Department of Economic and Social Affairs (UNDESA) has reported that in the year 2023 it had dropped to about 0.9%, less than half of its peak between 1962 and 1968. Although still growing, the UN predicts that global population will level out around 2084, and some sources predict the start of a decline before then.

The principal cause of this phenomenon is the abrupt decline in the global total fertility rate, from 5.3 in 1963 to 2.2 in 2023, as the world continues to move through the stages of the demographic transition. The decline in the total fertility rate has occurred in every region of the world and has brought renewed concern for population decline, sparked by some demographers, journalists, politicians, and political economists. The era of rapid global population increase, and concomitant concern about a population explosion, has been short compared with the span of human history.

== Long-term future trends ==
A long-term population decline is typically caused by sub-replacement fertility, coupled with a net immigration rate that fails to compensate for the excess of deaths over births. A long-term decline is accompanied by population aging and creates an increase in the ratio of retirees to workers and children. When a sub-replacement fertility rate remains constant, population decline accelerates over the long term. Because of the global decline in the fertility rate, projections published by the Population Division of the United Nations Department of Economic and Social Affairs (UNDESA) on the future of global population show a marked slowing of population growth and the possibility of long-term decline.

The table below summarizes the UN projections for future population growth. Any such long-term projections are necessarily highly speculative. The UN divides the world into six regions. Under their projections, during the period 2045–2050, Europe's population will be in decline and all other regions will experience significant reductions in growth; then, by the end of the 21st century (the period 2095–2100), three of these regions will be showing population decline and global population will have peaked and started to decline.

Annual percent change in population for three periods in the future
Region	2022–27	2045–50	2095–2100
Africa	2.3	1.6	0.4
Asia	0.6	0.2	−0.5
Europe	−0.1	−0.3	−0.3
Latin America & the Caribbean	0.6	0.1	−0.6
Northern America	0.6	0.3	0.2
Oceania	1.1	0.7	0.3
The World	0.9	0.5	0.1

Note: the UN's methods for generating these numbers are explained at this reference.

The table shows UN predictions of long-term decline of population growth rates in every region; however, short-term baby booms and healthcare improvements, among other factors, can cause reversals of trends. Population declines in Russia (1994–2008), Germany (1974–1984), and Ireland (1850–1961) have seen long-term reversals. The United Kingdom, having seen almost zero growth during the period 1975–1985, is now (2015–2020) growing at 0.6% per year.

Some scholars believe there exists a form of "cultural selection" that will significantly affect future demographics due to significant differences in fertility rates between cultures, such as within certain religious groups, that cannot be explained by factors such as income. In the book Shall the Religious Inherit the Earth?, Eric Kaufmann argues that demographic trends point to religious fundamentalists greatly increasing as a share of the population over the next century. From the perspective of evolutionary psychology, it is expected that selection pressure should occur for whatever psychological or cultural traits maximize fertility.

== Possible consequences ==
Predictions of economic and other effects from a slow population decline due to low fertility rates are theoretical since such a phenomenon is unprecedented. Many studies say that the impact of population growth on economic growth is generally small and can be positive, negative, or nonexistent. A 2009 meta-study found no relationship between population growth and economic growth.

=== Possible negative effects ===
The effects of a declining population can be negative. As a country's population declines, GDP growth may grow even more slowly or decline. If that condition continues, a country would experience an economic recession. If these conditions become permanent, the country could find itself in a permanent recession.

Other possible negative impacts of a declining population are:

- A rise in the dependency ratio which would increase the economic pressure on the workforce
- A loss of culture and the diminishment of trust among citizens
- A crisis in end-of-life care for the elderly because there are insufficient caregivers for them
- Difficulties in funding entitlement programs because there are fewer workers relative to retirees
- A decline in military strength
- A decline in innovation since change comes from the young
- A strain on mental health caused by permanent recession
- Deflation caused by the aging population

All these negative effects could be summarized under the heading of "underpopulation". Underpopulation is usually defined as a state in which a country's population has declined too much to support its current economic system.

Population decline can cause internal population pressures that then lead to secondary effects such as ethnic conflict, forced refugee flows, and hyper-nationalism. This is particularly true in regions where different ethnic or racial groups have different growth rates. Low fertility rates that cause long-term population decline can also lead to population aging, an imbalance in the population age structure. Population aging in Europe due to low fertility rates has given rise to concerns about its impact on social cohesion.

A smaller national population can also have geo-strategic effects, but the correlation between population and power is a tenuous one. Technology and resources often play more significant roles. Since World War II, the "static" theory saw a population's absolute size as being one of the components of a country's national power. More recently, the "human capital" theory has emerged. This view holds that the quality and skill level of a labor force and the technology and resources available to it are more important than simply a nation's population size. While there were in the past advantages to high fertility rates, that "demographic dividend" has now largely disappeared.

=== Possible positive effects ===
The effects of a declining population can be positive. The single best gauge of economic success is the growth of GDP per person, not total GDP. GDP per person (also known as GDP per capita or per capita GDP) is a rough proxy for average living standards. A country can both increase its average living standard and grow its total GDP even though its population growth is low or even negative. The economies of both Japan and Germany went into recovery around the time their populations began to decline (2003–2006). In other words, both the total and per capita GDP in both countries grew more rapidly after 2005 than before. Russia's economy also began to grow rapidly from 1999 onward, even though its population had been shrinking since 1992–93. Many Eastern European countries have been experiencing similar effects to Russia. Such renewed growth calls into question the conventional wisdom that economic growth requires population growth, or that economic growth is impossible during a population decline.

More recently (2009–2017) Japan has experienced a higher growth of GDP per capita than the United States, even though its population declined over that period. In the United States, the relationship between population growth and growth of GDP per capita has been found to be empirically insignificant. This evidence shows that individual prosperity can grow during periods of population decline.

Attempting to better understand the economic impact of these pluses and minuses, Lee et al. analyzed data from 40 countries. They found that typically fertility well above replacement and population growth would be most beneficial for government budgets. Fertility near replacement and population stability, however, would be most beneficial for standards of living when the analysis includes the effects of age structure on families as well as governments. Fertility moderately below replacement and population decline would maximize per capita consumption when the cost of providing capital for a growing labor force is taken into account.

A focus on productivity growth that leads to an increase in both per capita GDP and total GDP can bring other benefits to:

- the workforce through higher wages, benefits and better working conditions
- customers through lower prices
- owners and shareholders through higher profits
- the environment through more money for investment in more stringent environmental protection
- governments through higher tax proceeds to fund government activities

Another approach to possible positive effects of population decline is to consider Earth's human carrying capacity. Global population decline would begin to counteract the negative effects of human overpopulation. There have been many estimates of Earth's carrying capacity, each generally predicting a high-low range of maximum human population possible. The lowest low estimate is less than one billion, the highest high estimate is over one trillion. A statistical analysis of these historical estimates revealed that the median of high estimates of all of the ranges would be 12 billion, and the median of low estimates would be about 8 billion. According to this analysis, this planet may be entering a zone where its human carrying capacity could be exceeded. However, the large variance in the estimates found in these studies diminishes our confidence in them, as such estimates are very difficult to make with current data and methods.

== National efforts to confront declining populations ==
A country with a declining population will struggle to fund public services such as health care, old age benefits, defense, education, water and sewage infrastructure, etc. To maintain some level of economic growth and continue to improve its citizens' quality of life, national efforts to confront declining populations will tend to focus on the threat of a declining GDP. Because a country's GDP is dependent on the size and productivity of its workforce, a country confronted with a declining population, will focus on increasing the size and productivity of that workforce.

=== Increase the size of the workforce ===
A country's workforce is that segment of its working-age population that is employed. Working age population is generally defined as those people aged 15–64.

Policies that could increase the size of the workforce include:

==== Natalism ====
Natalism is a set of government policies and cultural changes that promote parenthood and encourage women to bear more children. These generally fall into three broad categories:

1. Financial incentives. These may include child benefits and other public transfers that help families cover the cost of children.
2. Support for parents to combine family and work. This includes maternity-leave policies, parental-leave policies that grant (by law) leaves of absence from work to care for their children, and childcare services.
3. Broad social change that encourages children and parenting

For example, Sweden built up an extensive welfare state from the 1930s and onward, partly as a consequence of the debate following "Crisis in the Population Question", published in 1934. Today, (2017) Sweden has extensive parental leave that allows parents to share 16 months of paid leave per child, the cost divided between both employer and State.

Other examples include Romania's natalist policy during the 1967–1990 period and Poland's 500+ program.

==== Encourage women to join the workforce ====
Encouraging those women in the working-age population who are not working to find jobs would increase the size of the workforce. Female participation in the workforce currently (2018) lags men's in all but three countries worldwide. Among developed countries, the workforce participation gap between men and women can be especially wide. For example, currently (2018), in South Korea 59% of women work compared with 79% of men, and currently (2023) in India, only 33% of women are working.

However, even assuming that more women would want to join the workforce, increasing their participation would give these countries only a short-term increase in their workforce, because at some point a participation ceiling is reached, further increases are not possible, and the impact on GDP growth ceases.

==== Stop the decline of men in the workforce ====
In the United States, the labor force participation of men has been falling since the late 1960s. The labor force participation rate is the ratio between the size of the workforce and the size of the working-age population. In 1969 the labor force participation rate of men in their prime years of 25–54 was 96% and in 2023 was 89%.

==== Raise the retirement age ====
Raising the retirement age has the effect of increasing the working-age population, but raising the retirement age requires other policy and cultural changes if it is to have any impact on the size of the workforce:

1. Pension reform. Many retirement policies encourage early retirement. For example, in 2018 less than 10% of Europeans between ages 64–74 were employed. Instead of encouraging work after retirement, many public pension plans restrict earnings or hours of work.
2. Workplace cultural reform. Employer attitudes towards older workers must change. Extending working lives will require investment in training and working conditions to maintain the productivity of older workers.

One study estimated that increasing the retirement age by 2–3 years per decade between 2010 and 2050 would offset declining working-age populations faced by "old" countries such as Germany and Japan.

==== Increase immigration ====
A country can increase the size of its workforce by importing more migrants into their working age population. Even if the indigenous workforce is declining, qualified immigrants can reduce or even reverse this decline. However, this policy can only work if the immigrants can join the workforce and if the indigenous population accepts them.

For example, starting in April 2019, Japan, a country with a declining workforce, introduced a "Specified Skilled Worker" status of residence for foreign workers directed towards industries facing severe labor shortages, including caregiving, construction, agriculture and shipbuilding. Depending on a worker's knowledge, experience, and skill proficiency, as well as the policy's requirements, they could receive a 5 year individual visa or an indefinite (renewable) visa that permits family accompaniment. The government initially aimed to admit up to approximately 345,000 workers across 14 industrial fields during the program's first five years. In 2024, the program was expanded to 16 fields, with the government setting an intake cap of 820,000 workers for the five fiscal years from 2024 through 2028.

==== Reduce emigration ====
Long-term persistent emigration, often caused by what is called "Brain Drain", is often one of the major causes of a country's population decline. However, research has also found that emigration can have net positive effects on sending countries, so this would argue against any attempts to reduce it.

=== Increase the productivity of the workforce ===
Development economists would call increasing the size of the workforce "extensive growth". They would call increasing the productivity of that workforce "intensive growth". In this case, GDP growth is driven by increased output per worker, and by extension, increased GDP/capita.

In the context of a stable or declining population, increasing workforce productivity is better than mostly short-term efforts to increase the size of the workforce. Economic theory predicts that in the long term, most growth will be attributable to intensive growth, that is, new technology and new and better ways of doing things plus the addition of capital and education to spread them to the workforce.

Increasing workforce productivity through intensive growth can only succeed if workers who become unemployed through the introduction of new technology can be retrained so that they can keep their skills current and not be left behind. Otherwise, the result is technological unemployment. Funding for worker retraining could come from a robot tax, although the idea is controversial.

== Contemporary decline by country ==
The table below shows the countries that have been affected by population decline between 2010 and 2020. The term "population" used here is based on the de facto definition of population, which counts all residents regardless of legal status or citizenship, except for refugees not permanently settled in the country of asylum, who are generally considered part of the population of the country of origin. This means that population growth in this table includes net changes from immigration and emigration. For a table of natural population changes, see the list of countries by natural increase.

Population decline by country
Country or region	2010 population estimate	2020 population estimate	Average annual rate of population change (%)	
Country or region	2010 population estimate	2020 population estimate	2010–2015	2015–2020
Andorra	73,600	77,543	−0.2	+1.5
Albania	2,913,018	2,877,797	−0.2	−0.1
Armenia	3,073,000	2,959,000	−0.0	−0.0
Belarus	9,495,608	9,410,259	−0.1	−0.1
Bosnia and Herzegovina	3,488,441	3,276,845	−1.6	−1.2
Bulgaria	7,504,868	6,520,314	−0.8	−0.9
Croatia	4,295,427	4,105,267	−0.5	−0.8
Cuba	11,167,934	11,181,595	+0.1	−0.1
Estonia	1,332,000	1,326,804	−0.2	+0.2
(Georgia (country)) Georgia (Note: Figure includes Abkhazia and South Ossetia.)	4,087,379	3,989,167	−0.3	−0.0
Greece	11,119,102	10,423,054	−0.4	−0.6
Hungary	10,014,000	9,660,351	0.3	−0.2
Italy	59,277,000	60,461,826	+0.1	−0.3
Japan	128,057,352	126,476,461	−0.1	−0.3
Latvia	2,120,504	1,864,884	−1.1	−1.0
Lithuania	3,141,976	2,678,864	−1.2	−1.0
Moldova (Note: Includes the Pridnestrovian Moldavian Republic.)	4,081,000	3,100,930	−2.2	−1.2
North Macedonia	1,946,298	1,856,124	−0.3	−0.6
Poland	38,529,866	37,846,611	−0.0	−0.1
Portugal	10,572,721	10,196,709	−0.4	−0.1
Puerto Rico	3,722,000	3,285,874	−1.4	−1.1
Romania	20,246,798	19,237,691	−0.5	−0.5
Serbia	7,291,436	6,740,936	−0.4	−0.4
Spain	46,486,621	46,745,896	−0.0	+0.3
Syria	22,338,000	18,207,894	−2.6	+1.3
Ukraine	45,962,947	41,390,728	−0.3	−0.5
Venezuela	27,244,464	28,609,886	+1.2	−1.1
Total	489,583,360	474,509,310		

=== East Asia ===
==== China ====
China's population peaked at 1.43 billion in 2021 and began declining in 2022. China recorded more deaths than births for the first time in 2022 with a net decrease of 850,000 and this trend continued in 2023 when deaths overnumbered births by a margin of more than 1 million and in 2024 with deaths overnumbering births by 1.4 million. The Population Division of the United Nations Department of Economic and Social Affairs, assuming that China's total fertility rate will rise from 1.0 in 2023 to 1.35 by 2100, projects its population to fall to 639 million by 2100, a decline of about 54%.

==== Japan ====
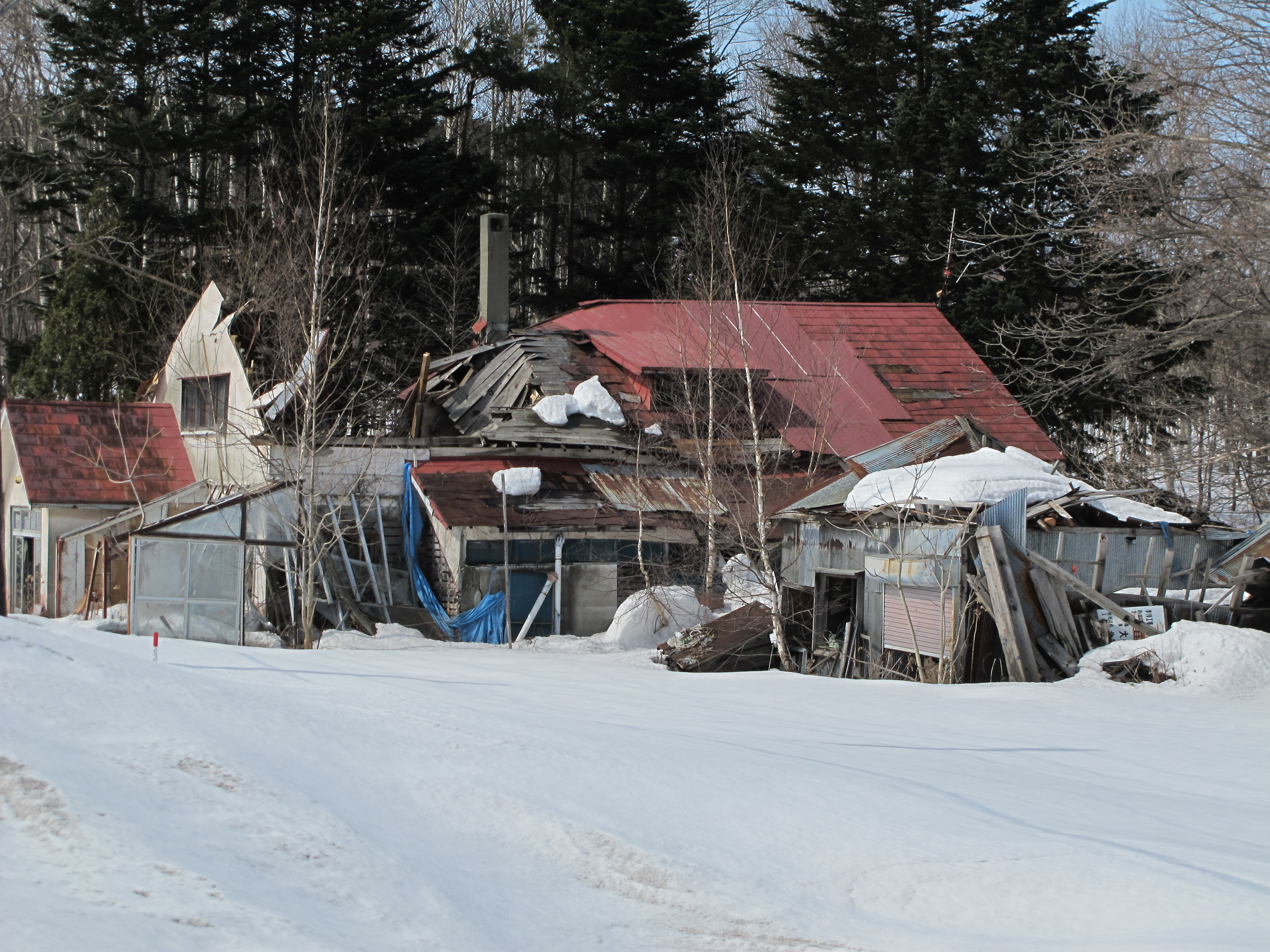
An abandoned house in Yubari district, Hokkaido, an area which has suffered sharp population decline

Though Japan's natural increase turned negative as early as 2005, the 2010 census result figure was slightly higher, at just above 128 million, than the 2005 census. Factors implicated in the puzzling figures were more Japanese returnees than expected as well as changes in the methodology of data collection. However, the official count put the population as of October 1, 2015, at 127.1 million, down by 947,000 or 0.7% from the previous quinquennial census. The gender ratio is increasingly skewed; some 106 women per 100 men live in Japan. In 2019, Japan's population fell by a record-breaking 276,000; if immigration is excluded from the figures, the drop would have been 487,000. Given the population boom of the 1950s and 1960s, the total population is still 52% above 1950 levels. The UN's Population Division, assuming that Japan's total fertility rate will rise from 1.2 in 2023 to 1.47 by 2100, projects its population to fall to 77 million by 2100, a decline of about 38%.

==== South Korea ====
South Korea's total fertility rate has been consistently lower than that of Japan, breaking below 1 in 2018, and fell to 0.778 in 2022. As a result, its population fell in 2020 for the first time in the country's history from 51.8 million in 2020 to 51.6 in 2022. The UN's Population Division, assuming that South Korea's total fertility rate will rise from 0.72 in 2023 to 1.3 by 2100, projects its population to fall to nearly 22 million by 2100, a decline of about 58%.

==== Taiwan ====
Taiwan recorded more deaths than births for the first time in 2020, despite recording virtually no COVID-19 deaths, thus starting an era of demographic decline for the foreseeable future. Taiwan's population fell from 23.6 million in 2020 to 23.4 in 2023, while the total fertility rate decreased from 1.05 in 2020 to 0.85 in 2023. The UN's Population Division, assuming that Taiwan's total fertility rate will rise from 0.87 in 2023 to 1.33 by 2100, projects its population to fall to 10 million by 2100, a decline of about 57%.

==== Thailand ====
Thailand's total fertility rate has been consistently lower than the replacement rate of 2.1 since the beginning of the 1990s and reached a new low in 2022, at 1. Thailand's population decline started in 2020 and Thailand for the first time recorded more deaths than births in 2021. This negative natural population change amplified in 2022 and 2023 and, in the absence of substantial immigration, this trend will continue in the coming years due to the very low fertility rate.

=== Eastern Europe and former Soviet republics ===
The natural population change, from the CIA World Factbook, 2025: 35 and up 30 to 34.9 25 to 29.9 20 to 24.9 15 to 19.9 10 to 14.9 / 5 to 9.9 0 to 4.9 -5 to -0.1 -10 to -5.1 -11.4 (Ukraine) No data

Population in the ex-USSR and Eastern Europe is rapidly shrinking due to low birth rates, very high death rates (linked to alcoholism and high rates of infectious diseases such as AIDS and TB), as well as high emigration rates. In Russia and the former communist bloc, birth rates fell abruptly after the dissolution of the Soviet Union, and death rates generally rose sharply. In addition, in the 25 years after 1989, some 20 million people from Eastern Europe are estimated to have migrated to Western Europe or the United States.

==== Belarus ====
Belarus's population peaked at 10,151,806 in the 1989 Census and declined to 9,480,868 as of 2015 as estimated by the state statistical service. This represents a 7.1% decline since the peak census figure.

==== Estonia ====
In the last Soviet census of 1989, it had a population of 1,565,662, which was close to its peak population. The state statistics reported an estimate of 1,314,370 for 2016. This represents a 19.2% decline since the peak census figure.

==== Georgia ====
In the last Soviet census of 1989, it had a population of 5,400,841, which was close to its peak population. The state statistics reported an estimate of 4,010,000 for the 2014 Census, which includes estimated numbers for quasi-independent Abkhazia and South Ossetia. This represents a 25.7% decline since the peak census figure, but nevertheless somewhat higher than the 1950 population.

==== Latvia ====
When Latvia split from the Soviet Union, it had a population of 2,666,567, which was very close to its peak population. The latest census recorded a population of 2,067,887 in 2011, while the state statistics reported an estimate of 1,986,086 for 2015. This represents a 25.5% decline since the peak census figure, with only one of two nations worldwide falling below 1950 levels. The decline is caused by both a negative natural population growth (more deaths than births) and a negative net migration rate. As of 1 May 2024, Latvia had a total population of 1,862,700.

==== Lithuania ====
When Lithuania split from the Soviet Union, it had a population of 3.7 million, which was close to its peak population. The latest census recorded a population of 3.05 million in 2011, down from 3.4 million in 2001, further falling to 2,988,000 on September 1, 2012. This represents a 23.8% decline since the peak census figure, and some 13.7% since 2001.

==== Ukraine ====
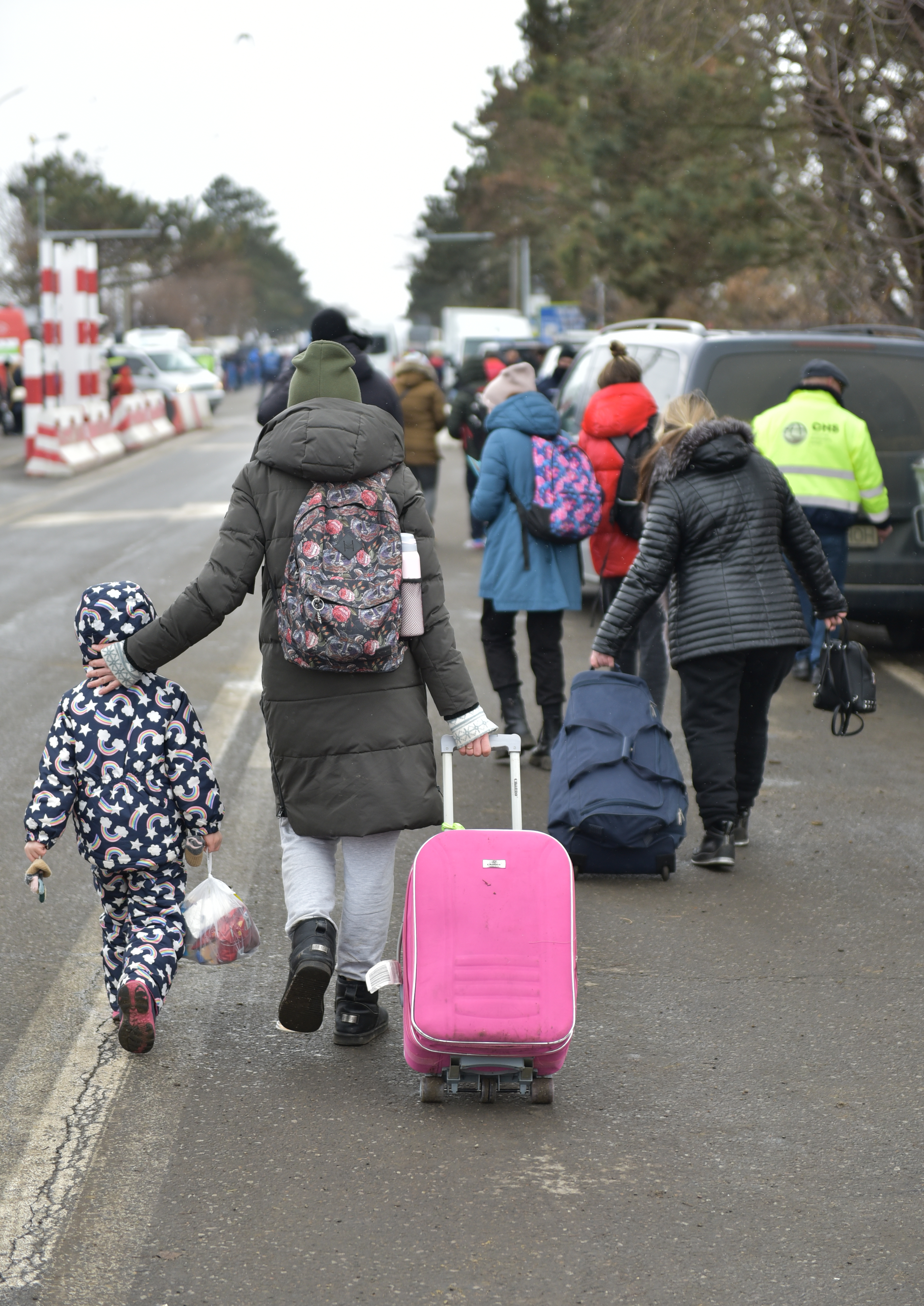
Ukrainian refugees entering Romania, 5 March 2022

The Ukrainian census in 1989 resulted in 51,452,034 people. Ukraine's own estimates show a peak of 52,244,000 people in 1993; however, this number has plummeted to 45,439,822 as of December 1, 2013. Having lost Crimean territory to Russia in early 2014 and subsequently experiencing war, the population dropped to 42,981,850 as of August 2014. This represents a 19.7% decrease in total population since the peak figure, but 16.8% above the 1950 population even without Crimea. Its absolute total decline (9,263,000) since its peak population is the highest of all nations; this includes loss of territory and heavy net emigration. Eastern Ukraine may yet lose many Russian-speaking citizens due to the new Russian citizenship law. An editorial projects significant gender and age imbalance in the population in Ukraine as a substantial problem if most refugees, as in other cases, do not return over time. Approximately 3.8 million more people have left the country during the 2022 Russian invasion of Ukraine, and thousands have died in the conflict.

The 2022 Russian invasion of Ukraine considerably deepened the country's demographic crisis. The birth rate in Ukraine was 28% lower in the first six months of 2023 compared to the same period in 2021. A July 2023 study by the Vienna Institute for International Economic Studies stated that "[r]egardless of how long the war lasts and whether or not there is further military escalation, Ukraine is unlikely to recover demographically from the consequences of the war. Even in 2040 it will have only about 35 million inhabitants, around 20% fewer than before the war (2021: 42.8 million) and the decline in the working-age population is likely to be the most severe and far-reaching."

==== Hungary ====
Hungary's population peaked in 1980, at 10,709,000, and has continued its decline to under 10 million as of August 2010. This represents a decline of 7.1% since its peak; however, compared to neighbors situated to the East, Hungary peaked almost a decade earlier yet the rate has been far more modest, averaging −0.23% a year over the period.

=== Balkans ===
==== Albania ====
Albania's population in 1989 recorded 3,182,417 people, the largest for any census. Since then, its population declined to an estimated 2,893,005 in January 2015. The decline has since accelerated with a 1.3% drop in population reported in 2021 leaving a total population of 2.79 million. This represents a decrease of 12% in total population since the peak census figure.

==== Bosnia and Herzegovina ====
Bosnia and Herzegovina's population peaked at 4,377,033 in the 1991 Census, shortly before the Yugoslav wars that produced tens of thousands of civilian victims and refugees. The latest census of 2016 reported a population of 3,511,372. This represents a 19.8% decline since the peak census figure.

==== Bulgaria ====
Bulgaria's population declined from a peak of 9,009,018 in 1989 and since 2001, has lost yet another 600,000 people, according to 2011 census preliminary figures to no more than 7.3 million, further down to 7,245,000. This represents a 24.3% decrease in total population since the peak and a −0.82% annual rate in the last 10 years.

The Bulgarian population has fallen by more than 844,000 people, or 11.5 percent, in the last decade, the National Institute of Statistics in Sofia said during a presentation of the results so far of the 2021 census, the first since 2011. The country currently employs just over 6.5 million people, compared to 7.3 million in the previous workforce.

==== Croatia ====
Croatia's population declined from 4,784,265 in 1991 to 4,456,096 (by the old statistical method) of which 4,284,889 are permanent residents (by the new statistical method), in 2011, a decline of 8% (11.5% by the new definition of permanent residency in 2011 census). The main reasons for the decline since 1991 are: low birth rates, emigration and war in Croatia. From 2001 and 2011 main reason for the drop in population is due to a difference in the definition of permanent residency used in censuses till 2001 (censuses of 1948, 1953, 1961, 1971, 1981, 1991 and 2001) and the one used in 2011. By 2021 the population dropped to 3,888,529, a 9.25% decrease from 2011 numbers.

==== Greece ====
Greece's population declined by about half a million people between its 2011 and 2021 censuses. The main drivers are increased emigration rates and lower birth rates following the 2008 financial crisis.

==== Romania ====
Romania's 1991 census showed 23,185,084 people, and the October 2011 census recorded 20,121,641 people, while the state statistical estimate for 2014 is 19,947,311. This represents a decrease of 16.2% since the historical peak in 1991.

==== Serbia ====
Serbia recorded a peak census population of 7,822,795 in 1991 in the Yugoslav era, falling to 7,186,862 in the 2011 census. That represents a decline of 5.1% since its peak census figure.

=== Other ===
==== Italy ====
Although Italy had recorded more deaths than births continuously since 1993, the country's population only peaked in 2015 at 60,796,000 due to substantial immigration. The Italian population fell by a record amount in 2020, and in 2021, it recorded the lowest number of births since its unification in 1861 at only 399,431, with its population being projected to shrink to 47.2 million in 2070, a decline of nearly 20 percent.

As of April 2024, Italian population stands at 58,968,501 inhabitants. The UN's Population Division, assuming that Italy's total fertility rate will rise from 1.2 in 2024 to 1.5 by 2100, projects its population to be 35.5 million by 2100, a decline of about 40%.

==== Uruguay ====
Uruguay's fertility rate had been consistently low in Latin America since the 20th century at 3 children per women, with the fertility rates in Latin American countries converging at 2 children beginning in the 1990s, but Uruguay's fertility rate declined sharply from 2 in 2015 to 1.28 in 2022, largely due to decreased births to women under 20. Uruguay recorded more deaths than births for the first time in 2021 and the population decline has been only offset slightly by immigration.

==== Venezuela ====
In spite of a positive natural increase of almost 1% per year, Venezuela's population has declined during the 2015-20 period due to emigration caused by threats of violence as well as shortages of basic needs.

== Resumed declines ==
=== Russia ===
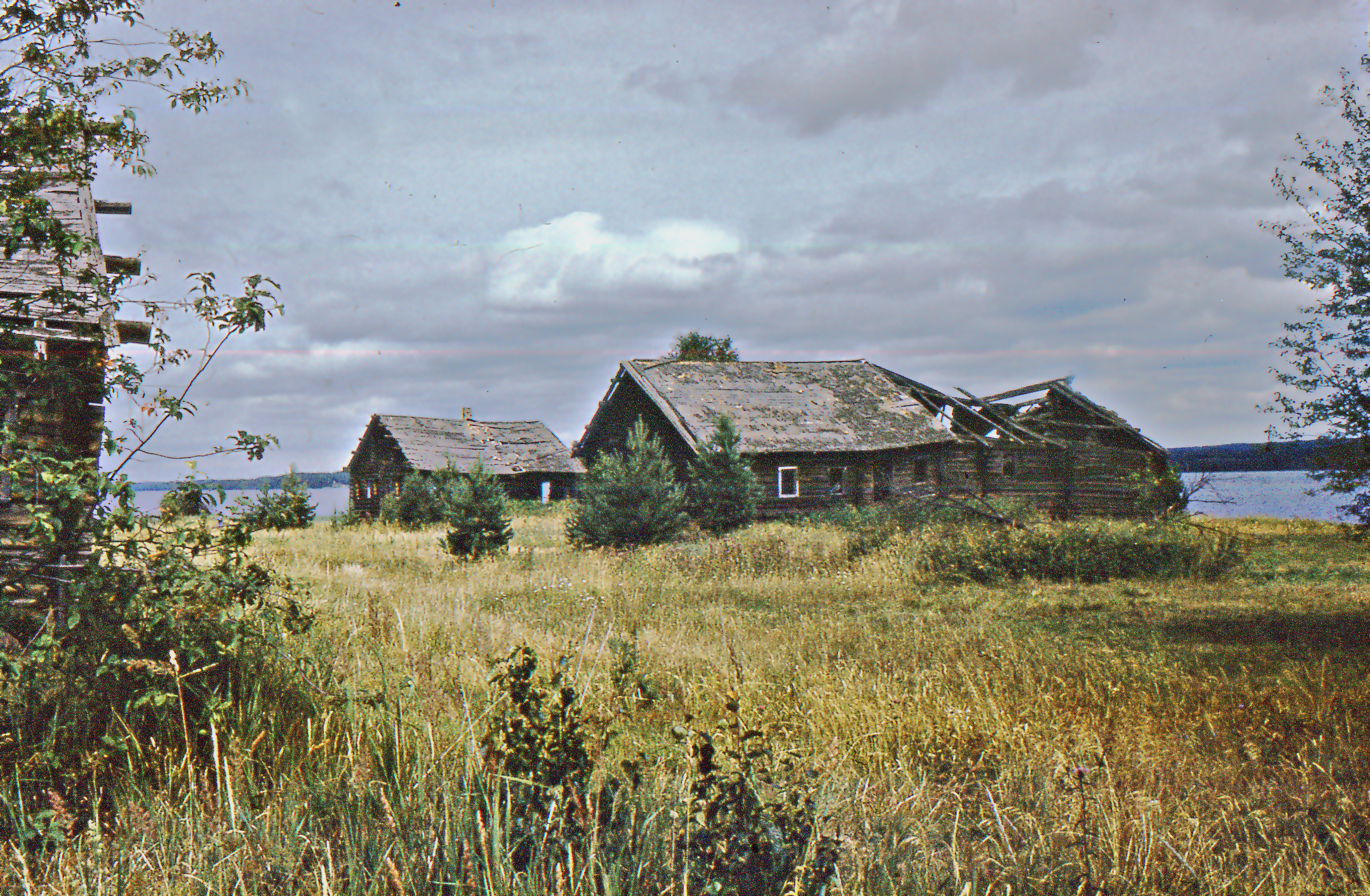
Thousands of abandoned villages are scattered across Russia.

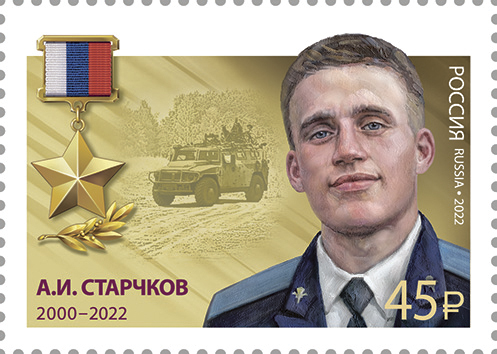
Stamp depicting Russian soldier killed in Ukraine. The war in that country has further exacerbated Russia's demographic crisis.

The decline in Russia's total population is among the largest in numbers, but not in percentage. After having peaked at 148,689,000 in 1991, the population then decreased, falling to 142,737,196 by 2008. This represents a 4.0% decrease in total population since the peak census figure. However, the Russian population then rose to 146,870,000 in 2018. This recent trend can be attributed to a lower death rate, higher birth rate, the annexation of Crimea and continued immigration, mostly from Ukraine and Armenia. It is some 40% above the 1950 population.

Russia has become increasingly reliant on immigration to maintain its population; 2021 had the highest net immigration since 1994, despite which there was a small overall decline from 146.1 million to 145.4 million in 2021, the largest decline in over a decade. The natural death rate in January 2020, 2021, and 2022 have each been nearly double the natural birth rate.

In March 2023, The Economist reported that "Over the past three years the country has lost around 2 million more people than it would ordinarily have done, as a result of war [in Ukraine], disease and exodus." According to Russian economist Alexander Isakov, "Russia's population has been declining and the war will reduce it further. Reasons? Emigration, lower fertility and war-related casualties."

According to the analysis of economists Oleg Itskhoki and Maxim Mironov, Russia may lose more than 10% of men aged 20–29 as a result of losses in the war and emigration. In June 2024, it was estimated that approximately 2% of all Russian men between the ages of 20 and 50 may have been killed or seriously wounded in Ukraine since February 2022.

The UN is projecting that the decline that started in 2021 will continue, and if current demographic conditions persist, Russia's population would be 120 million in fifty years, a decline of about 17%.^{,} The UN's 2024 scenarios project Russia's population to be between 74 million and 112 million in 2100, a decline of 25 to 50%.

=== Portugal ===
Between 2011 and 2021, Portugal's population declined from 10.56 to 10.34 million people. The fertility rate has been consistently below 2 since the early 1980s, and the gap is increasingly being made up by immigrants.

== Purportedly halted declines ==
=== Armenia ===
Armenia's population peaked at 3,604,000 in 1991 and declined to a post-Soviet low of 2,961,500 at the beginning of 2020, in spite of a continuous natural population increase. This represented a 17.2% decrease in the total population since the peak census figure. Armenia's population began to increase again to 2,962,300 in 2021; 2,969,200 in 2022 and 2,990,900 in 2023. As of the beginning of 2024 the population had rebounded to 3,015,400 at 1978 levels.

=== Germany ===
In Germany, a continuously low birth rate has been offset by waves of immigration. From 2002 to 2011 the population declined by 2 million, the most since the Cold War. The 2011 national census recorded a population of 80.2 million people, following which official estimates showed an increase of 3 million over the next decade. The official estimate for 2020 was a slight decrease from 2019. Third-party estimates show a slight increase, instead.

=== Ireland ===
In the current area of the Republic of Ireland, the population has fluctuated dramatically. The population of Ireland was 8 million in 1841, but it dropped due to the Irish famine and later emigration. The population of the Republic of Ireland hit a bottom at 2.8 million in the 1961 census, but it then rose and in 2011 it was 4.58 million. As of 2020, it is estimated to be just under 5 million according to the country's Central Statistics Office.

=== Poland ===
The population of Poland in the last 20 years has caused many years of recorded growth and decline with the population. The recorded population of Poland between 2002 and 2006 had shown a decreasing trend while between 2007 and 2012 the population had an increasing trend. Though since 2020, COVID-19 has started to cause the population to decline rapidly, with over 117,000 people reportedly dying from COVID-19 in Poland by October 2022. However, Poland also saw a large number of Ukrainian Refugees move into Poland, with over 7.8 million people having crossed the border by October 2022 between Poland and Ukraine since the war began, of which 1.4 million have stayed in Poland.

=== Syria ===
Syria's population declined during the period 2012 - 2018 due to an ongoing civil war. During that period many Syrians emigrated to other Middle Eastern countries. The civil war makes an accurate count of the Syrian population difficult, but the UN estimates that it peaked in 2012 at 22.9 million and dropped to 18.9 million in 2018, a decline of 17%. Since then Syria's population has resumed growing, and the UN projects that by 2025 it will have reached 24.9 million.

== Declines within regions or ethnic groups of a country ==
=== United States ===
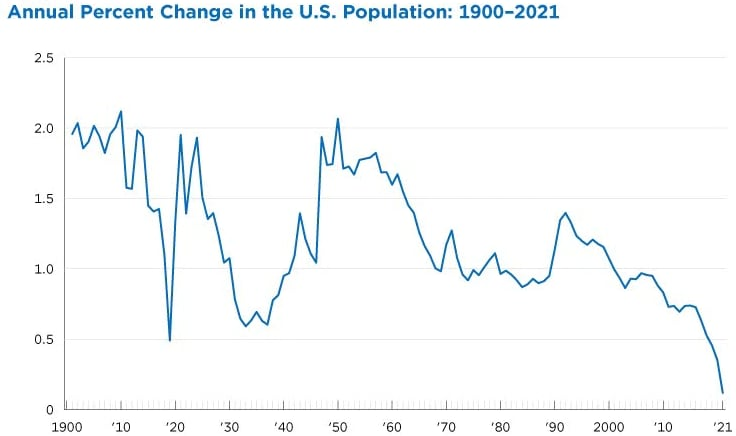
US population growth rates since 1900

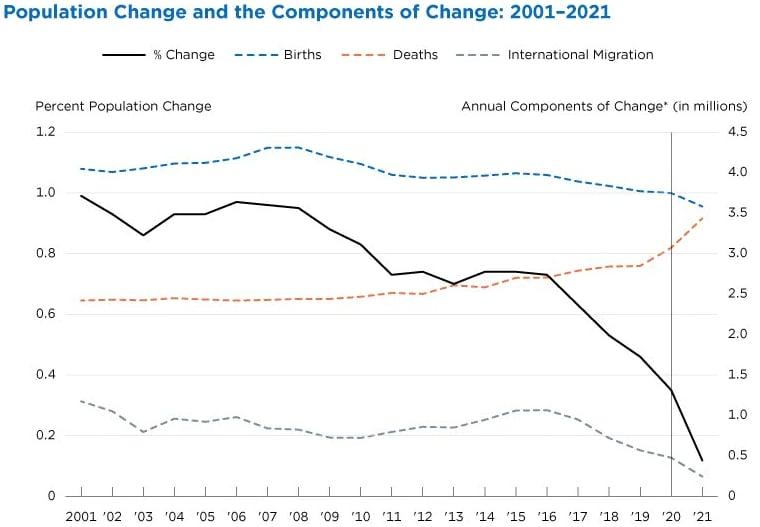
US population change and the components of change since 2000

In spite of a growing population at a national level, some formerly large American municipalities have dramatically shrunk after the Second World War, and in particular during the 1950s–1970s, due to suburbanization, urban decay, race riots, high crime rates, deindustrialization and emigration from the Rust Belt to the Sun Belt. For instance, Detroit's population peaked at almost 2 million in 1953, and then declined to less than 700,000 by 2020. Other cities whose populations have dramatically shrunk since the 1950s include Baltimore, Buffalo, Cincinnati, Cleveland, Flint, Gary, New Orleans, St. Louis, Pittsburgh, Scranton, Youngstown and Wilmington (Delaware). In addition, the depopulation of the Great Plains, caused by a very high rate of rural flight from isolated agricultural counties, has been going on since the 1930s.

In addition, starting from the 1950s, the United States has witnessed the phenomenon of the white flight or white exodus, the large-scale migration of people of various European ancestries from racially mixed urban regions to more racially homogeneous suburban or exurban regions. The term has more recently been applied to other migrations by whites, from older, inner suburbs to rural areas, as well as from the U.S. Northeast and Midwest to the warmer climate in the Southeast and Southwest. Migration of middle-class white populations was observed during the Civil rights movement in the 1950s and 1960s out of cities such as Cleveland, Detroit, Kansas City and Oakland, although racial segregation of public schools had ended there long before the Supreme Court of the United States' decision Brown v. Board of Education in 1954. In the 1970s, attempts to achieve effective desegregation (or "integration") using forced busing in some areas led to more families moving out of former areas. More recently, as of 2018, California had the largest ethnic/racial minority population in the United States; Non-Hispanic whites decreased from about 76.3 – 78% of the state's population in 1970 to 36.6% in 2018 and 39.3% of the total population was Hispanic-Latino (of any race).

A combination of long-term trends, housing affordability, falling birthrates and rising death rates from the COVID-19 pandemic have caused as many as 16 US states to start declining in population.

The Commonwealth of Puerto Rico's population peaked in 2000 at 3.8 million and has since declined to 3.3 million in 2020, due to a negative natural change, and emigration, due to natural disasters and economic difficulties.

=== France ===
The term 'Empty diagonal' is used for French departments that have low or declining populations. Due to continued emigration, many departments in France are seeing declines in population, including: Aisne, Allier, Ardennes, Cantal, Charente, Cher, Corrèze, Creuse, Dordogne, Eure, Eure-et-Loir, Haute-Marne, Haute-Saône, Haute-Vienne, Indre, Jura, Loir-et-Cher, Lot-et-Garonne, Lozère, Manche, Marne, Mayenne, Meuse, Moselle, Nièvre, Orne, Paris, Sarthe, Somme, Territoire de Belfort, Vosges and Yonne. For more information, see the List of French departments by population.

=== South Africa ===
The term 'white flight' has also been used for large-scale post-colonial emigration of whites from Africa, or parts of that continent, driven by levels of violent crime and anti-colonial state policies. In recent decades, there has been a steady and proportional decline in South Africa's white community, due to higher birth rates among other South African ethnic groups, as well as a high rate of emigration. In 1977, there were 4.3 million White South Africans, constituting 16.4% of the population at the time. An estimated 800,000 emigrated between 1995 and 2016, citing crime and a lack of employment opportunities. It may also be noted that in recent times, a large proportion of white South African emigrants have chosen to return home. For instance, in May 2014, Homecoming Revolution estimated that around 340,000 white South Africans had returned to South Africa in the preceding decade. Furthermore, immigration from Europe has also supplemented the white population. The 2011 census found that 63,479 white people living in South Africa were born in Europe; of these, 28,653 had moved to South Africa since 2001.

=== India ===
The Parsis of India have one of the lowest fertility rates in the world (0.8 children per woman in 2017); this coupled with emigration has resulted in population decline at least since the 1940s. Their population has more than halved from its peak.

=== Lebanon ===
Lebanon has recorded major waves of emigration from the late 19th century to early 20th century and during the Lebanese Civil War which led to the exodus of almost one million people from Lebanon. Due to the Syrian refugee crisis, according to the UN's population division, Lebanon's population increased massively from 5.05 million in 2011 to 6.5 million in 2015, but the population began declining again in 2016, with a total population of 6.26 million, 6.11 million in 2017, 5.95 million in 2018, and 5.76 million in 2019. Between 2018 and 2023, the decline in the number of Lebanese accelerated from 25,000 per year to 78,000 due to massive emigration caused by the Lebanese liquidity crisis.

However, the number of births to refugees has been increasing and the country hosts a large population of unregistered refugees, other illegal residents, and other people without legal documentation, making it difficult to count the population of Lebanon. Dr. Ali Faour, a population affairs researcher, estimates the Lebanese population including undocumented migrants to be 8 million. Regardless, the population of Lebanese nationality continues to age and decline as financial struggles increase emigration and decrease marriages. Consequentially, the share of Lebanese nationals in Lebanon may have decreased to between 45 and 50 percent, a sharp decline from 80 percent in 2004, although a 2024 report estimated the share at 65 to 69 percent of the resident population.

Regionally, the mountainous and Christian-majority areas have low fertility rates comparable to European nations, with most of the population increase being concentrated in northern Lebanon.

== See also ==
- Antinatalism
- Climate crisis
- Counterurbanization
- Ghost town
- Holocene extinction
- Human extinction
- Human overpopulation
- Human population planning
- List of countries by rate of natural increase
- List of countries by population growth rate
- Negative Population Growth
- Political demography
- Population ageing
- Population cycle
- Population growth
- Rural flight
- Societal collapse
- Steady-state economy
- Sub-replacement fertility
- Total fertility rate
- Urban decay
- Zero population growth

Case studies:

- Aging of Europe
- Aging of Japan
- Aging of South Korea
- Aging of the United States
- Empty diagonal
- History of Easter Island#Destruction of society and population
- List of sovereign states and dependencies by total fertility rate
- Russian Cross
