= List of countries by rate of natural increase =

Natural annual increase in population per 1,000 people, from the CIA World Factbook, 2025.: 35 and up 30 to 34.9 25 to 29.9 20 to 24.9 / 15 to 19.9 10 to 14.9 5 to 9.9 0 to 4.9 / -5 to -0.1 -10 to -5.1 -11.4 (Ukraine) No data

The rate of natural increase (RNI) is the birth rate minus the death rate. It is typically expressed either as a number per 1,000 individuals in the population or as a percentage. RNI can be either positive or negative. It contrasts to total population change by ignoring net migration.

== Countries and subnational areas ==
Rates are CIA World Factbook estimates of the number of births or deaths in 2025 per 1,000 people. These are also known as crude birth or death rates. The natural increase rate is calculated from the birth and death rates.

- Note: Locations link to demographics pages.

List of countries and subnational areas by rate of natural increase
Location	Rate per 1,000 people		
Location	Natural increase	Crude births	Crude deaths
Niger	37.05	46.29	9.24
Somalia	35.14	46.36	11.22
Uganda	34.3	38.91	4.61
Angola	33.02	39.75	6.73
Benin	32.37	39.82	7.45
Mali	31.57	39.44	7.87
DR Congo	31.43	38.8	7.37
Burundi	30.4	35.91	5.51
Afghanistan	30.2	35.99	5.79
Chad	29.87	38.62	8.75
Guinea-Bissau	28.83	35.82	6.99
Mauritania	28.83	34.01	5.18
Tanzania	28.49	33.45	4.96
Guinea	27.35	35.04	7.69
South Sudan	27.03	35.68	8.65
Sudan	26.95	32.95	6
Mozambique	26.73	36.07	9.34
Togo	25.53	30.17	4.64
Zambia	24.69	29.6	4.91
Senegal	24.69	29.54	4.85
Burkina Faso	24.5	31.74	7.24
Malawi	24.47	28.04	3.57
Nigeria	24.14	33.56	9.42
Cameroon	24.06	30.79	6.73
West Bank	24.04	27.24	3.2
Congo	23.7	28.34	4.64
Liberia	23.55	31.72	8.17
Ethiopia	23.5	29.08	5.58
Gaza Strip	23.28	26.05	2.77
Ivory Coast	22.94	29.87	6.93
Yemen	22.86	29.07	6.21
Papua New Guinea	22.21	27.57	5.36
Zimbabwe	21.78	28.18	6.4
Madagascar	21.59	27.54	5.95
Ghana	21.36	27.09	5.73
Sierra Leone	21.24	30.04	8.8
Kenya	21.21	25.93	4.72
Gambia	20.96	26.49	5.53
Tajikistan	20.86	25.31	4.45
Central African Republic	20.45	31.49	11.04
Rwanda	20.18	25.05	4.87
Gabon	20.07	25.51	5.44
São Tomé and Príncipe	20.03	25.87	5.84
Equatorial Guinea	19.74	28.55	8.81
Eritrea	19.49	25.92	6.43
Iraq	19.4	23.26	3.86
Pakistan	19.26	25.05	5.79
Jordan	18.4	21.9	3.5
Solomon Islands	17.63	21.57	3.94
Namibia	17.57	23.93	6.36
Oman	17.48	20.65	3.17
Syria	17.29	21.26	3.97
Timor-Leste	16.53	23.39	6.86
Marshall Islands	16.44	20.81	4.37
Libya	16.35	19.83	3.48
Vanuatu	16.34	20.36	4.02
Algeria	15.23	19.62	4.39
Kuwait	15.06	17.36	2.3
Honduras	14.8	19.7	4.9
Comoros	14.74	21.12	6.38
Djibouti	14.46	21.46	7
Tonga	14.45	19.43	4.98
Botswana	14.36	21.16	6.8
Egypt	14.3	18.63	4.33
Israel	14	18.89	4.89
Uzbekistan	13.93	18.93	5
Tuvalu	13.79	21.57	7.78
Haiti	13.76	20.76	7
Bangladesh	13.4	19.45	6.05
Micronesia	13.32	17.55	4.23
Laos	13.15	19.22	6.07
Samoa	13.12	18.53	5.41
Nauru	13.09	19.64	6.55
Mongolia	12.66	18.01	5.35
Belize	12.57	17.44	4.87
Kiribati	12.52	19.4	6.88
Eswatini	12.36	20.66	8.3
Kyrgyzstan	12.27	18.26	5.99
Guatemala	12.13	17.12	4.99
Cambodia	12.12	17.74	5.62
Cape Verde	11.78	17.51	5.73
Guam (US)	11.72	17.9	6.18
Panama	11.63	17.11	5.48
Brunei	11.62	15.58	3.96
Lesotho	11.48	21.68	10.2
Nepal	11.04	16.66	5.62
Bolivia	11.03	17.02	5.99
Nicaragua	10.93	16.07	5.14
Paraguay	10.69	15.66	4.97
South Africa	10.65	17.21	6.56
Lebanon	10.5	16.73	6.23
Maldives	10.47	14.77	4.3
Turkmenistan	10.44	16.43	5.99
Dominican Republic	10.43	17.4	6.97
Ecuador	10.3	17.42	7.12
Philippines	10.22	16.02	5.8
Venezuela	9.91	16.45	6.54
Saudi Arabia	9.9	13.41	3.51
Northern Mariana Islands (US)	9.89	15.8	5.91
Morocco	9.84	16.5	6.66
Guyana	9.63	16.68	7.05
Bhutan	9.3	15.05	5.75
Bahrain	9.22	12.08	2.86
Turks and Caicos Islands (UK)	9.14	12.73	3.59
Fiji	9.05	15.63	6.58
Saint Martin (France)	8.95	13.78	4.83
Antigua and Barbuda	8.93	14.7	5.77
United Arab Emirates	8.92	10.65	1.73
American Samoa (US)	8.9	15.3	6.4
Vietnam	8.77	14.58	5.81
Kazakhstan	8.73	16.83	8.1
Jamaica	8.71	16.08	7.37
Mexico	8.69	14.73	6.04
Burma	8.27	15.44	7.17
Malaysia	8.25	14.05	5.8
Suriname	7.89	14.63	6.74
Qatar	7.77	9.19	1.42
Colombia	7.77	14.73	6.96
Indonesia	7.73	14.55	6.82
Bahamas	7.66	13.1	5.44
New Caledonia (France)	7.6	13.6	6
Turkey	7.37	13.56	6.19
Kosovo	7.28	14.16	6.88
India	7.21	15.91	8.7
Anguilla (UK)	6.93	11.69	4.76
French Polynesia (France)	6.86	12.7	5.84
Iran	6.82	11.24	4.42
Sri Lanka	6.73	14.38	7.65
Peru	6.64	16.43	9.79
El Salvador	6.53	12.46	5.93
Faroe Islands (Denmark)	6.18	14.76	8.58
Brazil	5.97	13.04	7.07
Iceland	5.85	12.47	6.62
Costa Rica	5.62	10.86	5.24
Wallis and Futuna (France)	5.5	11.63	6.13
New Zealand	5.47	12.4	6.93
Montserrat	5.46	11.64	6.18
Sint Maarten (Netherlands)	5.41	12	6.59
British Virgin Islands (UK)	5.22	10.8	5.58
Cayman Islands (UK)	5.17	11.41	6.24
Tunisia	4.95	11.35	6.4
Dominica	4.87	13.02	8.15
Gibraltar (UK)	4.84	13.55	8.71
Azerbaijan	4.69	11.13	6.44
Grenada	4.59	13	8.41
Seychelles	4.57	11.59	7.02
Singapore	4.39	8.77	4.38
Jersey	4.17	11.97	7.8
Saint Kitts and Nevis	4.15	11.58	7.43
Greenland (Denmark)	4.03	13.32	9.29
North Korea	3.98	12.99	9.01
Saint Vincent and the Grenadines	3.97	11.72	7.75
Australia	3.94	10.75	6.81
Curaçao (Netherlands)	3.8	12.71	8.91
Ireland	3.52	10.95	7.43
Macau (China)	3.29	8.31	5.02
Palau	3.01	11.53	8.52
Cyprus	2.84	9.95	7.11
Saint Lucia	2.76	11.17	8.41
Aruba	2.59	11.44	8.85
Luxembourg	2.58	9.24	6.66
Argentina	2.53	10.47	7.94
Cook Islands (New Zealand)	2.37	11.85	9.48
Liechtenstein	2.07	10.31	8.24
Chile	2.02	8.81	6.79
United States	1.99	10.75	8.76
Norway	1.75	10.35	8.6
Thailand	1.74	9.82	8.08
Trinidad and Tobago	1.64	10.33	8.69
United Kingdom	1.51	10.76	9.25
U.S. Virgin Islands (US)	1.45	10.88	9.43
Bermuda (UK)	1.42	10.82	9.4
Switzerland	1.4	10.01	8.61
Canada	1.37	9.12	7.75
Netherlands	0.98	10.68	9.7
France	0.97	10.88	9.91
Sweden	0.93	10.56	9.63
Albania	0.81	8.71	7.9
Saint Helena, Ascension and Tristan da Cunha (UK)	0.76	9.31	8.55
Armenia	0.64	10.24	9.6
Mauritius	0.59	9.73	9.14
Montenegro	0.48	10.77	10.29
North Macedonia	0.45	10.07	9.62
Guernsey (UK)	0.45	9.64	9.19
San Marino	0.14	9.04	8.9
Isle of Man (UK)	0.05	10.25	10.2
Saint Barthélemy (France)	-0.43	9.32	9.75
Belgium	-0.46	9.09	9.55
China	-0.69	7.28	7.97
Hong Kong (China)	-0.71	7.45	8.16
Denmark	-0.75	9.81	10.56
Uruguay	-0.83	9.05	9.88
Taiwan	-0.96	7.22	8.18
Malta	-0.98	7.67	8.65
Georgia	-1.15	11.74	12.89
Andorra	-1.26	6.88	8.14
Austria	-1.4	8.81	10.21
Slovakia	-1.41	9.77	11.18
Czech Republic	-2.26	9.56	11.82
South Korea	-2.65	4.29	6.94
Puerto Rico	-2.7	7.78	10.48
Spain	-2.82	7.16	9.98
Portugal	-2.89	8.03	10.92
Germany	-3.09	8.87	11.96
Finland	-3.26	7.75	11.01
Poland	-3.53	8.03	11.56
Cuba	-3.64	7.78	11.42
Slovenia	-3.68	7.52	11.2
Barbados	-3.94	8.02	11.96
Italy	-4.07	7.13	11.2
Croatia	-4.38	8.49	12.87
Greece	-4.61	7.38	11.99
Estonia	-4.71	7.86	12.57
Monaco	-4.9	6.46	11.36
Belarus	-5.05	8.16	13.21
Japan	-5.2	6.84	12.04
Hungary	-5.38	9.03	14.41
Bosnia and Herzegovina	-5.41	6.88	12.29
Saint Pierre and Miquelon (France)	-5.52	6.31	11.83
Russia	-5.66	8.27	13.93
Moldova	-5.71	8.35	14.06
Romania	-5.83	8.45	14.28
Serbia	-5.94	8.72	14.66
Bulgaria	-6.3	7.88	14.18
Lithuania	-7.09	7.01	14.1
Latvia	-7.44	7.24	14.68
Ukraine	-11.37	6.24	17.61

== Summary by region ==
The table below assembles history and projections for the major regions shown. The numbers show total births minus total deaths per 1,000 population for the region for each time period. The first four columns show actual rate of natural increase. The remaining columns show projections using the medium fertility variant. All numbers are from the UN Population Division.

Region	1950–55	1970–75	1990–95	2010–15	2015–20	2025–30	2035–40	2045–50
World	+17.8	+19.5	+15.2	+11.9	+10.9	+8.7	+7.0	+5.6
Africa	+21.5	+27.4	+26.1	+26.4	+25.3	+22.8	+20.6	+18.1
Asia	+19.3	+22.8	+16.4	+10.7	+9.3	+6.3	+3.8	+1.8
Europe	+10.3	+5.5	+0.3	−0.1	−0.7	−2.1	−2.8	−3.2
Latin America & The Caribbean	+27.1	+25.8	+19.0	+11.9	+10.4	+7.5	+4.9	+2.8
Northern America	+14.9	+6.4	+6.6	+4.2	+4.2	+3.5	+2.0	+1.1
Oceania	+15.7	+14.5	+12.2	+10.5	+9.7	+8.0	+6.4	+5.3

== See also ==
- Demographics of the world
- List of countries by population growth rate
