= List of countries by population growth rate =

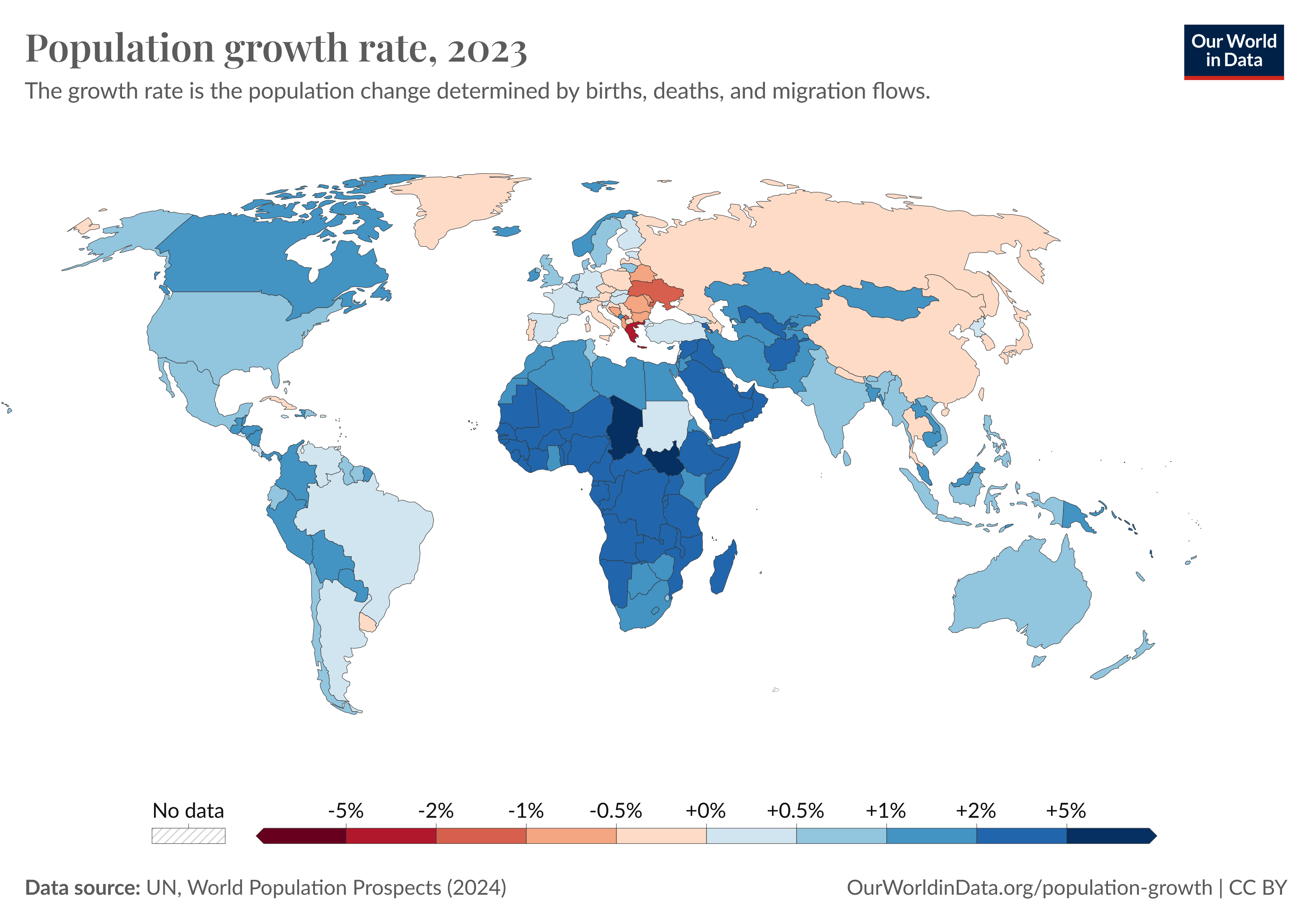
Population growth rate for 2023 by Our World in Data

This article includes a table of annual population growth rate for countries and subnational areas.

== Methodology ==
The table below shows annual population growth rate history and projections for various areas, countries, regions and sub-regions from various sources for various time periods.

The right-most column shows a projection for the time period shown using the medium fertility variant. Preceding columns show actual history. The number shown is the average annual growth rate for the period.

Population is based on the de facto definition of population, which counts all residents regardless of legal status or citizenship—except for refugees not permanently settled in the country of asylum, who are generally considered part of the population of the country of origin. This means that population growth in this table includes net changes from immigration and emigration. For a table of natural increase, see List of countries by rate of natural increase.

== Table ==
Asterisk (*) indicates "Demographics of Country or Territory" links.

Country (or territory)	Major religion	CIA 2023–2024		WB 2023	UN 2005–10	UN 2010–15	UN 2015–20
Country (or territory)	Major religion	(%)	Year	WB 2023	UN 2005–10	UN 2010–15	UN 2015–20
World		1.17		0.99	1.23	1.19	1.09
Afghanistan *	Islam	2.22	2024	2.7	2.78	3.16	2.41
Albania *	Islam	0.16	2024	-1.1	-0.92	-0.12	0.13
Algeria *	Islam	1.54	2024	1.6	1.63	1.98	1.67
Andorra *	Christianity	-0.12	2024	0.3	1.37	-1.59	-0.21
Angola *	Christianity	3.33	2024	3.0	3.57	3.52	3.28
Antigua and Barbuda *	Christianity	1.11	2024	0.6	1.18	1.08	1.01
Argentina *		0.79	2024	0.9	1.04	1.04	0.94
Armenia *	Christianity	-0.42	2024	-0.1	-0.71	0.27	0.15
Australia *		1.13	2024	2.4	1.78	1.46	1.30
Austria *		0.30	2024	1.0	0.38	0.53	0.24
Azerbaijan *		0.43	2024	-0.3	1.13	1.26	0.98
Bahamas *		1.07	2024	0.6	1.83	1.39	1.01
Bahrain *		0.82	2024	0.9	6.67	2.01	4.26
Bangladesh *		0.89	2024	1.0	1.18	1.16	1.04
Barbados *		0.23	2024	0.1	0.40	0.33	0.24
Belarus *		-0.42	2024	-0.5	-0.31	0.03	-0.15
Belgium *		0.53	2024	1.2	0.73	0.63	0.58
Belize *		1.47	2024	1.4	2.54	2.22	2.05
Benin *		3.29	2024	2.7	2.84	2.79	2.73
Bhutan *	Buddhism	0.95	2024	0.6	2.05	1.58	1.18
Bolivia *		1.00	2024	1.3	1.67	1.56	1.47
Bosnia and Herzegovina *		-0.25	2024	-0.7	-0.32	-1.03	-0.22
Botswana *		1.34	2024	1.7	1.64	1.84	1.79
Brazil *	Christianity	0.61	2024	0.5	1.03	0.91	0.63
Brunei *		1.40	2024	0.8	1.25	1.43	1.25
Bulgaria *		-0.66	2024	-0.5	-0.74	-0.62	-0.67
Burkina Faso *		2.40	2024	2.5	3.01	2.98	2.87
Myanmar *	Buddhism	0.71	2024	0.7	0.68	0.88	0.90
Burundi *		2.81	2023	2.7	3.33	3.03	3.15
Cape Verde *		1.16	2024	0.9			1.25
Cambodia *	Buddhism	0.99	2024	1.0	1.51	1.62	1.49
Cameroon *		2.71	2024	2.6	2.73	2.68	2.56
Canada *		0.71	2024	2.9	1.13	1.02	0.90
Central African Republic *		1.76	2024	2.9	1.50	0.43	1.58
Chad *		3.01	2024	3.1	3.32	3.29	3.01
Chile *	Christianity	0.63	2023	0.1	1.02	0.89	0.78
China * (Note: Mainland only. Excludes SARs and Taiwan)		0.23	2024	-0.1	0.57	0.54	0.39
Colombia *		0.54	2023	0.4	1.18	0.98	0.81
Comoros * (Note: Includes Mayotte)		1.34	2023	1.8	2.40	2.40	2.24
DR Congo *		3.13	2023	3.2	3.28	3.33	3.22
Congo *		2.33	2023	2.3	2.98	2.60	2.59
Costa Rica *		0.98	2023	0.6	1.35	1.12	0.96
Ivory Coast *		2.16	2023	2.5	2.13	2.49	2.49
Croatia *		-0.47	2023	-0.1	-0.23	-0.43	-0.58
Cuba *		-0.19	2023	-0.2	0.09	0.23	0.06
Cyprus *		1.00	2023	0.7	1.59	0.85	0.78
Czech Republic *		0.00	2023	1.9	0.54	0.13	0.06
Denmark *	Christianity	0.44	2023	0.7	0.49	0.48	0.38
Djibouti *		1.93	2023	1.4	1.66	1.72	1.51
Dominica *		0.02	2023	0.4	0.23	0.48	0.51
Dominican Republic *		0.88	2023	0.9	1.38	1.24	1.07
Ecuador *	Christianity	1.10	2023	1.0	1.67	1.56	1.42
Egypt *	Islam	1.59	2023	1.5	1.82	2.18	1.87
El Salvador *		0.46	2023	0.4	0.45	0.47	0.52
Equatorial Guinea *		3.36	2023	2.3	4.56	4.24	3.59
Eritrea *		1.08	2023	1.7	2.02	1.98	2.28
Estonia *		-0.74	2023	1.3	-0.35	-0.25	-0.23
Eswatini (Swaziland) *		0.72	2023	0.8	1.68	1.84	1.75
Ethiopia *		2.42	2023	2.5	2.67	2.60	2.43
Fiji *		0.42	2023	0.7	0.91	0.74	0.72
Finland *		0.22	2023	0.5	0.40	0.43	0.36
France * (Note: Metropolitan France only)		0.31	2023	0.3	0.58	0.45	0.39
Gabon *		2.39	2023	2.0	3.12	3.26	2.17
Gambia *		2.23	2023	2.5	3.17	3.12	2.93
Georgia *		0.01	2023	1.3	-1.17	-1.37	-0.27
Germany *		-0.12	2023	0.8	-0.19	0.20	0.20
Ghana *		2.19	2023	1.9	2.58	2.36	2.16
Greece *		-0.35	2023	-0.6	0.26	-0.40	-0.21
Grenada *		0.29	2023	0.6	0.33	0.41	0.46
Guatemala *		1.54	2023	1.4	2.22	2.10	1.94
Guinea *		2.75	2023	2.4	2.18	2.27	2.57
Guinea-Bissau *		2.54	2023	2.1	2.39	2.59	2.44
Guyana *		0.28	2023	0.6	-0.12	0.58	0.57
Haiti *		1.18	2023	1.2	1.53	1.38	1.20
Honduras *		1.16	2023	1.5	2.11	1.79	1.63
Hungary *		-0.31	2023	-0.6	-0.32	-0.29	-0.34
Iceland *		0.89	2023	3.0	1.65	0.61	0.77
India *	Hinduism	0.70	2023	0.8	1.46	1.23	1.10
Indonesia *	Islam	0.76	2023	0.7	1.35	1.25	1.05
Iran *		0.93	2023	0.7	1.14	1.25	1.04
Iraq *		1.94	2023	2.2	2.60	3.21	2.78
Ireland *		0.91	2023	2.6	1.87	0.31	0.78
Israel *	Judaism	1.43	2023	2.1	2.35	1.65	1.55
Italy *		-0.11	2023	-0.3	0.31	-0.08	-0.13
Jamaica *		0.09	2023	-0.1	0.52	0.39	0.29
Japan *		-0.41	2023	-0.5	0.03	-0.09	-0.23
Jordan *	Islam	0.79	2023	0.5	4.57	4.86	2.17
Kazakhstan *	Islam	0.73	2023	1.3	1.07	1.58	1.13
Kenya *		2.09	2023	2.0	2.74	2.66	2.49
Kiribati *		1.02	2023	1.7	2.12	1.82	1.71
North Korea *		0.44	2023	0.4	0.34	0.42	0.47
South Korea *		0.23	2023	0.1	0.57	0.52	0.36
Kuwait *	Islam	1.13	2023	1.0	5.51	5.44	1.78
Kyrgyzstan *	Islam	0.82	2023	1.8	1.32	1.57	1.44
Laos *	Buddhism	1.30	2023	1.4	1.64	1.30	1.45
Latvia *		-1.13	2023	0.1	-1.22	-1.30	-1.03
Lebanon *		0.64	2023	-2.5	1.68	5.99	0.57
Lesotho *		0.76	2023	1.1	0.91	1.27	1.31
Liberia *		2.71	2023	2.2	3.82	2.62	2.52
Libya *	Islam	1.54	2023	1.1	1.26	0.21	1.33
Liechtenstein *		0.70	2023	0.7	0.65	0.76	0.65
Lithuania *		-1.04	2023	1.4	-1.36	-1.27	-0.55
Luxembourg *		1.58	2023	2.3	2.08	2.19	1.27
Madagascar *		2.22	2023	2.4	2.86	2.72	2.67
Malawi *		2.28	2023	2.5	3.02	2.95	2.87
Malaysia *	Islam	1.01	2023	1.1	1.83	1.78	1.35
Maldives *	Islam	-0.17	2023	-0.5	2.68	2.76	1.85
Mali *		2.93	2023	3.1	3.27	2.95	2.99
Malta *	Christianity	0.59	2023	4.1	0.45	0.55	0.31
Marshall Islands *		1.30	2023	1.0	-0.04	0.14	0.10
Mauritania *	Islam	1.96	2023	2.6	2.85	2.95	2.69
Mauritius *		0.09	2023	-0.1	0.42	0.18	0.23
Mexico *	Christianity	0.61	2023	0.7	1.57	1.41	1.23
Micronesia *		-0.70	2023	0.9	-0.49	0.16	0.63
Moldova *		-1.14	2023	-2.1	-0.36	-0.09	-0.24
Monaco *		0.66	2023	-0.5	1.86	0.65	0.51
Mongolia *		0.83	2023	1.4	1.42	1.86	1.50
Montenegro *		-0.43	2023	-0.2	0.26	0.12	0.04
Morocco *	Islam	0.88	2023	1.0	1.20	1.43	1.26
Mozambique *		2.55	2023	2.8	2.93	2.91	2.86
Namibia *		1.80	2023	1.4	1.34	2.20	2.12
Nauru *		0.42	2023	0.9	-0.18	2.32	-0.06
Nepal *		0.74	2023	1.1	1.05	1.17	1.09
Netherlands *		0.36	2023	1.0	0.36	0.30	0.29
New Zealand *		1.06	2023	2.0	1.10	1.09	0.93
Nicaragua *		0.91	2023	1.4	1.29	1.17	1.07
Niger *		3.66	2023	3.7	3.75	3.84	3.81
Nigeria *		2.53	2023	2.4	2.64	2.67	2.58
North Macedonia *		0.11	2023	-1.1	0.10	0.08	0.08
Norway *	Christianity	0.79	2023	1.1	1.07	1.25	0.94
Oman *		1.80	2023	1.5	3.83	6.45	4.08
Pakistan *	Islam	1.91	2023	2.0	2.05	2.09	1.91
Palau *		0.39	2023	0.0	0.56	0.79	1.06
Panama *	Christianity	1.51	2023	1.3	1.80	1.71	1.55
Papua New Guinea *		2.31	2023	1.8	2.37	2.16	2.01
Paraguay *		1.12	2023	1.2	1.38	1.34	1.25
Peru *		0.50	2023	0.9	1.24	1.32	1.20
Philippines *	Christianity	1.58	2023	1.5	1.66	1.64	1.51
Poland *	Christianity	-0.28	2023	-0.4	-0.02	-0.03	-0.17
Portugal *		-0.17	2023	1.1	0.16	-0.44	-0.39
Qatar *		0.86	2023	0.8	14.93	6.65	2.36
Romania *	Christianity	-1.01	2023	0.0	-0.95	-0.56	-0.50
Russia *		-0.24	2023	-0.3	-0.07	0.04	0.01
Rwanda *		1.68	2023	2.3	2.61	2.53	2.36
Saint Kitts and Nevis *		0.59	2023	0.2	1.13	1.08	0.91
Saint Lucia *		0.27	2023	0.2	1.06	0.53	0.45
Saint Vincent and the Grenadines *		-0.16	2023	-0.2	0.10	0.03	0.24
Samoa *		0.65	2023	1.5	0.69	0.80	0.65
San Marino *		0.59	2023	-0.1	1.24	1.16	0.51
São Tomé and Príncipe *		1.45	2023	1.9	2.32	2.25	2.18
Saudi Arabia *	Islam	1.65	2023	1.5	2.75	2.81	1.90
Senegal *		2.52	2023	2.5	2.76	2.96	2.77
Serbia *		-0.63	2023	-0.7	-0.41	-0.40	-0.34
Seychelles *		0.60	2023	-0.1	0.59	0.50	0.50
Sierra Leone *		2.41	2023	2.1	2.65	2.28	2.12
Singapore *		0.90	2023	4.9	2.44	1.74	1.40
Slovakia *		-0.12	2023	-0.1	0.02	0.13	0.04
Slovenia *		-0.08	2023	0.4	0.48	0.29	0.07
Solomon Islands *		1.69	2023	2.2	2.32	2.14	1.94
Somalia *		2.55	2024	3.1	2.93	2.86	2.93
South Africa *		1.07	2024	0.9	1.10	1.39	1.20
South Sudan *		4.65	2024	1.6	4.33	3.32	2.72
Spain *		0.12	2024	1.2	1.21	-0.17	0.03
Sri Lanka *	Buddhism	0.39	2024	-0.7	0.68	0.50	0.35
Sudan *	Islam	2.55	2024	2.6	2.13	2.34	2.38
Suriname *		1.07	2024	0.8	1.06	1.01	0.87
Sweden *	Christianity	0.51	2023	0.5	0.76	0.78	0.72
Switzerland *		0.64	2023	0.8	1.11	1.21	0.83
Syria *	Islam	6.39	2023	4.9	2.78	-2.30	0.20
Taiwan *		0.03	2023		0.44	0.33	0.28
Tajikistan *		1.36	2023	1.9	2.18	2.24	2.06
Tanzania *		2.75	2023	2.9	3.14	3.12	3.06
Thailand *	Buddhism	0.20	2023	0.1	0.54	0.43	0.22
Timor-Leste *		2.10	2023	1.4	1.56	2.24	2.14
Togo *		2.45	2023	2.3	2.70	2.63	2.45
Tonga *		-0.30	2023	0.9	0.60	0.42	0.86
Trinidad and Tobago *		0.12	2023	0.3	0.48	0.48	0.26
Tunisia *		0.63	2023	0.8	1.04	1.16	1.09
Turkey *		0.64	2023	0.4	1.26	1.58	1.37
Turkmenistan *	Islam	0.95	2023	1.3	1.35	1.80	1.61
Tuvalu *		0.81	2023	0.7	0.99	0.87	0.88
Uganda *		3.22	2023	2.8	3.45	3.37	3.23
Ukraine *		-0.52	2023	-2.7	-0.48	-0.50	-0.49
United Arab Emirates *	Islam	0.58	2023	0.8	11.82	2.03	1.39
United Kingdom *		0.49	2023	0.8	0.98	0.65	0.58
United States *		0.68	2023	0.5	0.90	0.72	0.71
Uruguay *	Christianity	0.27	2023	0.0	0.29	0.34	0.36
Uzbekistan *		0.81	2023	2.1	1.52	1.59	1.41
Vanuatu *		1.59	2023	2.3	2.42	2.26	2.10
Vatican City *		0.00	2014		0.03	0.03	0.08
Venezuela *		2.40	2023	1.9	1.61	1.41	1.26
Vietnam *		0.93	2023	0.7	0.96	1.12	1.00
Western Sahara * (Sahrawi)					1.87	1.83	2.54
Yemen *		1.83	2023	2.2	2.74	2.62	2.33
Zambia *		2.86	2023	2.7	2.78	3.01	2.97
Zimbabwe *		1.95	2023	2.1	1.70	2.27	2.28
Anguilla * (UK)		1.77	2023		1.71	1.19
Aruba * (Netherlands)		1.11	2023	-0.2	0.31	0.45
Bermuda * (UK)		0.32	2023	-0.2	-0.36	-0.62
Caribbean Netherlands					7.49	3.43
Cayman Islands * (UK)		1.79	2023	0.9	2.65	1.55
Channel Islands (UK) (Note: Consists of Jersey and Guernsey)				0.7	0.67	0.51
Christmas Island * (Australia)		1.11	2014
Cook Islands * (NZ)		-2.31	2023		0.89	0.53
Curaçao *				-1.4	2.63	1.26
Faroe Islands * (Denmark)		0.63	2023	0.3	-0.59	0.33
Falkland Islands *		0.01	2014		0.10	-0.15
Gibraltar * (UK)		0.19	2023	0.1	1.11	0.94
Greenland * (Denmark)		-0.04	2023	0.4	-0.14	-0.13
Guadeloupe * (France)					0.27	0.50
Guam * (US)		0.13	2023	0.7	0.13	1.27
French Guiana *					2.78	2.78
Hong Kong *		0.15	2023	2.6	0.44	0.83
Isle of Man * (UK)		0.48	2023	0.2	0.97	0.80
Kosovo *		0.62	2023	-0.7
Macau *		0.71	2023	1.3	2.66	1.89
Martinique * (France)					-0.12	0.09
Mayotte * (France)					3.17	2.79
Montserrat * (UK)		0.46	2023		0.72	0.68
New Caledonia * (France)		1.17	2023	-0.5	1.49	1.32
Niue * (New Zealand)		-0.03	2023		-0.79	-0.14
Norfolk Island * (Australia)		0.01	2014		0.01
Northern Mariana Islands * (US)		-0.35	2023	0.5	-3.57	0.44
Pitcairn Islands * (UK)		0.00	2014
French Polynesia *		0.70	2023	0.8	1.01	1.07
Puerto Rico * (US)		-1.29	2023	-0.4	-0.28	-0.14
Réunion * (France)					0.96	0.73
Saint Helena and Dependencies * (UK)		0.11	2023		-0.48	-1.04
Saint Pierre and Miquelon * (France)		-1.19	2023		0.05	0.05
American Samoa *		-1.74	2023	-0.8	-1.21	-0.04
Sint Maarten * (Netherlands)		1.19	2023	0.7	0.36	3.13
Svalbard * (Norway)		-0.03	2019
Tokelau * (NZ)		-0.01	2019		-1.28	1.93
Turks and Caicos Islands * (UK)		1.81	2023	0.8	3.17	2.05
British Virgin Islands *		1.87	2023	0.7	3.23	2.02
U.S. Virgin Islands *		-0.49	2023	-0.5	-0.26	-0.02
Wallis and Futuna * (France)		0.23	2023		-0.98	-0.62
West Bank *		1.66	2023
Gaza Strip *		1.99	2023
Palestine *				2.4

== More maps ==
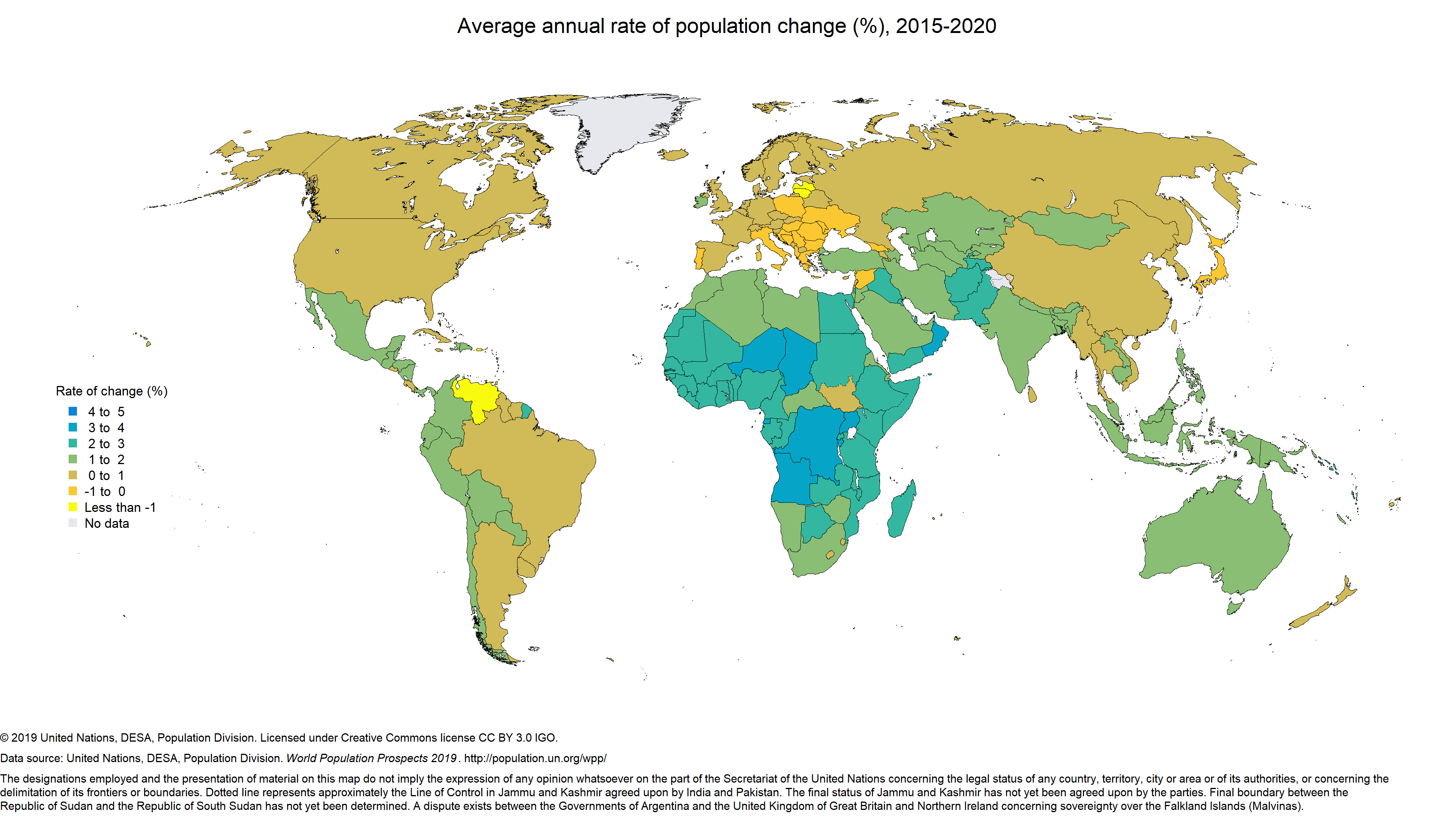
The population growth rate estimates (according to the United Nations Population Prospects 2019) between 2015 and 2020

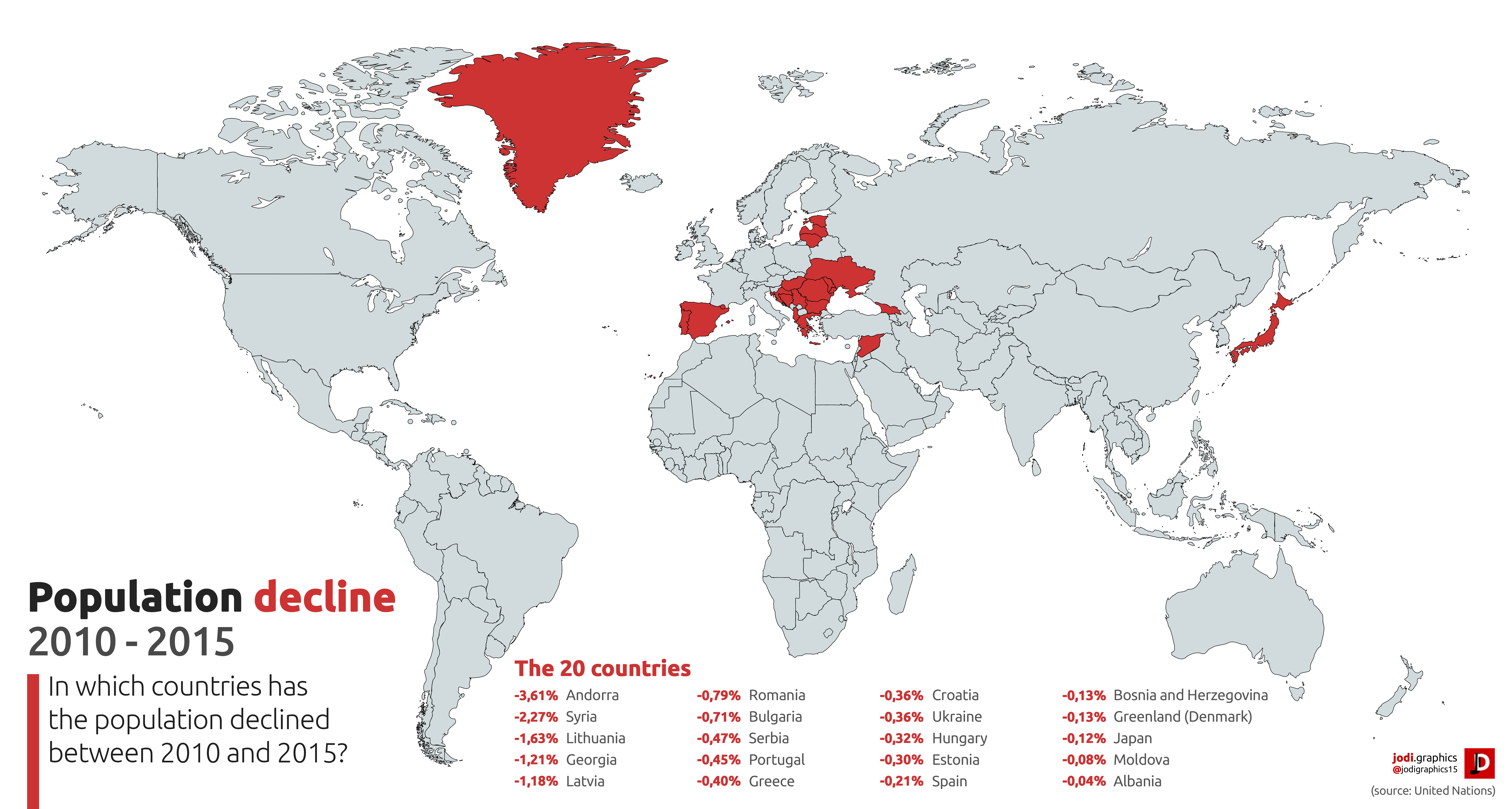
The 20 countries in the world in which the population has declined between 2010 and 2015

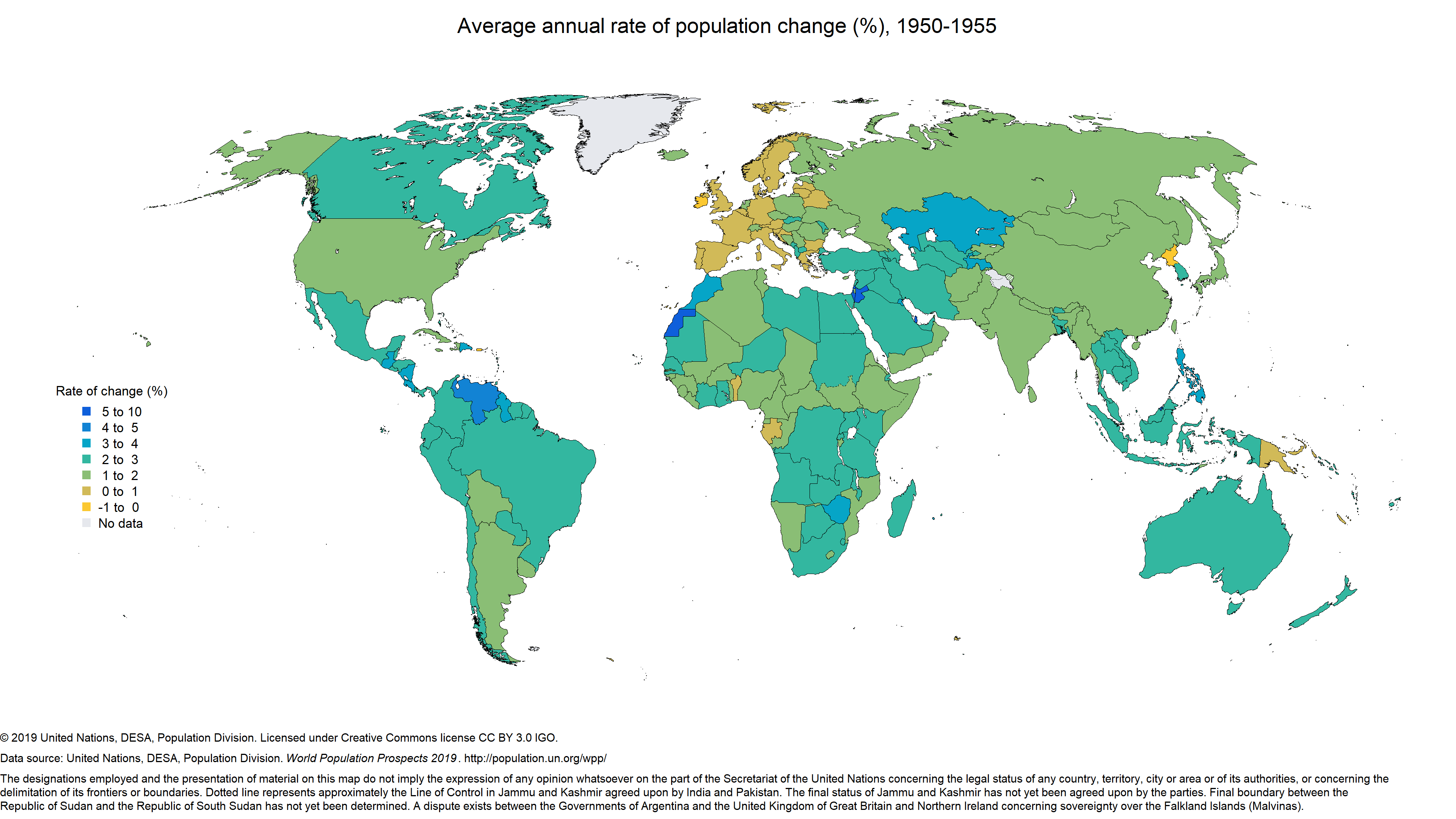
Historical population growth rate (1950–1955) estimated by the UN

== See also ==
- List of countries by rate of natural increase
- List of countries by past and projected future population
