= Whepstead =

Village in Suffolk, England

Coordinates: 52.190°N 0.683°E

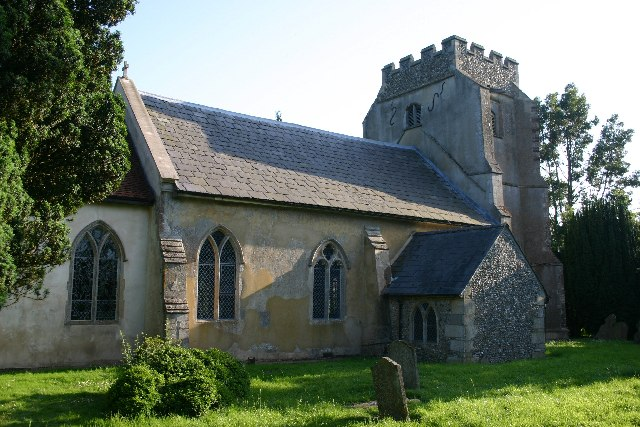
- St Petronilla Church, Whepstead

- Location within Suffolk
- District: West Suffolk
- Shire county: Suffolk
- Region: East
- Country: England
- Sovereign state: United Kingdom
- Post town: Bury St Edmunds
- Postcode district: IP29
- UK Parliament: West Suffolk

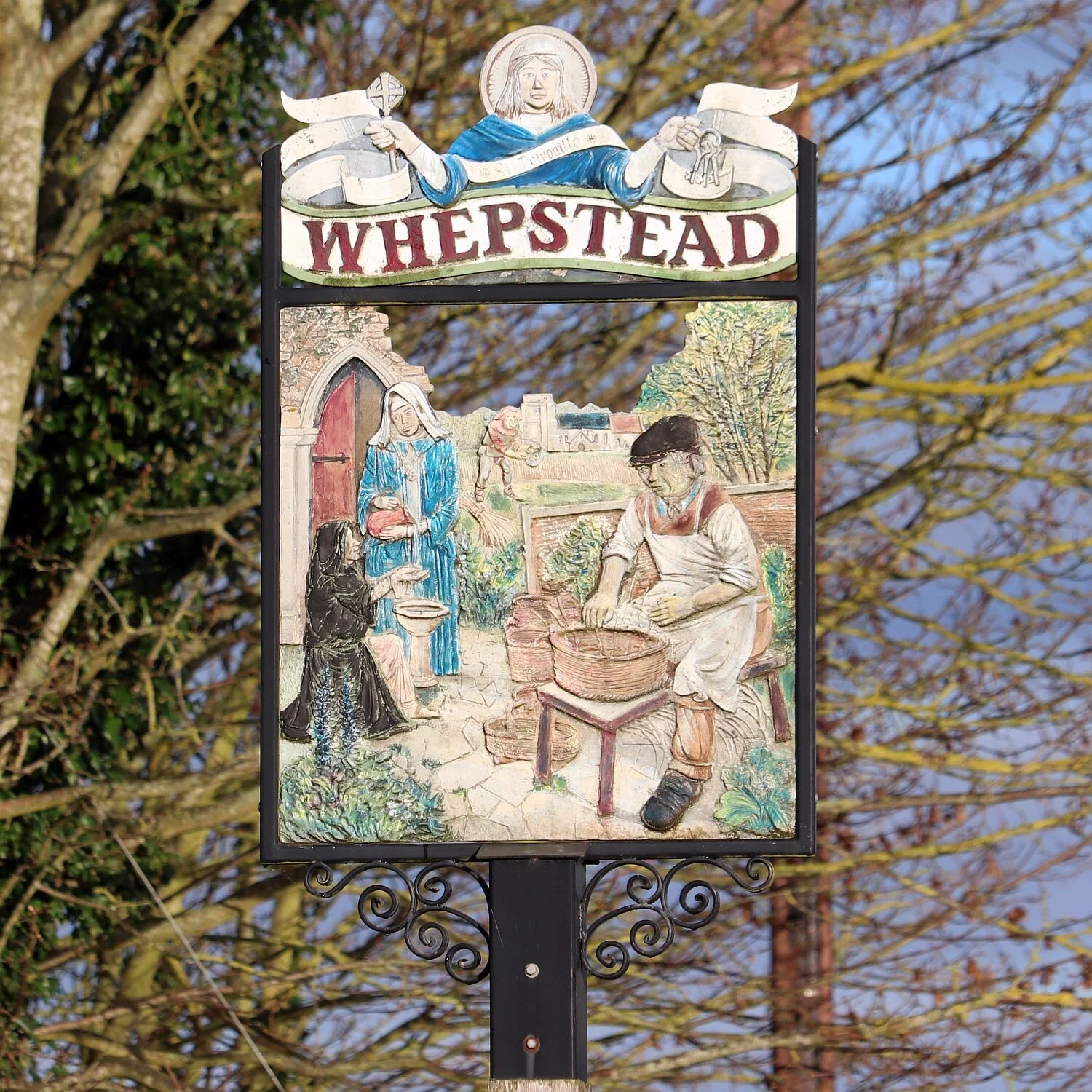
Whepstead Village Sign

Whepstead is a village and civil parish in the West Suffolk district of Suffolk in eastern England, located south of Bury St Edmunds. Once the property of Bury Abbey it became a possession of the Drury family at the Dissolution of the Monasteries in the 16th century. Whepstead Church is dedicated to St Petronilla the only such dedication in England.

In 1870–72, John Marius Wilson described Whepstead in his Imperial Gazetteer of England and Wales like this:

"WHEPSTEAD, a parish, with a village, in Thingoe district, Suffolk; 4½ miles SSW of Bury-St. Edmunds r. station. It has a post-office under Bury-St. Edmunds. Acres, 2,670. Real property, £4,281. Pop., 677. Houses, 140. The property is much subdivided. Plumpton House is the seat of W. R. Bevan, Esq. The living is a rectory in the diocese of Ely. Value, £600.* Patron, A. R. Steele, Esq. The church is good; and there are an endowed school with £35 a year, and charities £50"

Hamlets in the parish of Whepstead include Melon Green, Mickley Green and Stone Cross Green.

There is one pub in Whepstead called The White Horse, which is a free house built in the 17th century.

A community centre is located on the B1066 Bury St Edmunds to Hartest road. It is managed by the local community and is regularly used for activities including keep fit, carpet bowls, and the cricket club.

== Demography ==
According to the Office for National Statistics, at the time of the United Kingdom Census 2001, Whepstead had a population of 427 with 181 households.

=== Population change ===
Population change in Whepstead from 1801 to 1891
| Year | 1801 | 1811 | 1821 | 1831 | 1841 | 1851 | 1881 | 1891 |
|---|---|---|---|---|---|---|---|---|
| Population | 546 | 635 | 664 | 618 | 681 | 652 | 625 | 502 |
Source: A Vision of Britain Through Time

Population change in Whepstead from 1901 to 2001
| Year | 1901 | 1911 | 1921 | 1931 | 1951 | 1961 | 2001 |
|---|---|---|---|---|---|---|---|
| Population | 472 | 430 | 376 | 391 | 421 | 357 | 427 |
Source: A Vision of Britain Through Time

== Location grid ==
Mickley Green is to the East.
