= Rate of natural increase =

Birth rate minus death rate of a population

Natural annual increase in population per 1,000 people, from the CIA World Factbook, 2025.: 35 and up 30 to 34.9 25 to 29.9 20 to 24.9 / 15 to 19.9 10 to 14.9 5 to 9.9 0 to 4.9 / -5 to -0.1 -10 to -5.1 -11.4 (Ukraine) No data

In demography and population dynamics, the rate of natural increase (RNI), also known as natural population change, is defined as the birth rate minus the death rate of a particular population, over a particular time period. It is typically expressed either as a number per 1,000 individuals in the population or as a percentage. RNI can be either positive or negative. It contrasts to total population change by ignoring net migration.

This RNI gives demographers an insight into how a region's population is evolving, and these analyses can inform government attempts to shape RNI.

== Examples ==
In one example, the RNI—birth rate minus death rate—has declined in the US in the 21st century, indicating slower population growth, though without accounting for immigration trends.

Suppose a population of 5,000 individuals experiences 1,150 live births and 900 deaths over the course of one year.

To show the RNI over that year as a percentage, the equation would be

(1,150 – 900) ÷ 5,000 = 0.05 = +5%

To show the RNI as a number per 1,000 individuals in the population, the equation would be

(1,150 – 900) ÷ (5,000/1,000) = 250 ÷ 5 = +50

It can also be shown as natural births per 1,000 minus deaths per 1,000

(1,150 ÷ 5) – (900 ÷ 5) = 230 – 180 = +50

To convert the RNI per 1,000 population to a percentage, divide it by 1,000. The equation would be

+50 ÷ 1,000 = 0.05 = +5%

== Uses ==
The rate of natural increase gives demographers an idea of how a region's population is shifting over time. RNI excludes in-migration and out-migration, giving an indication of population growth based only on births and deaths. Comparing natural population change with total population change shows which is dominate for a particular region. Looking at this difference across regions reveals those that are changing mainly due to births exceeding deaths and those changing mainly due to migration. The map shows just such an analysis for the US.

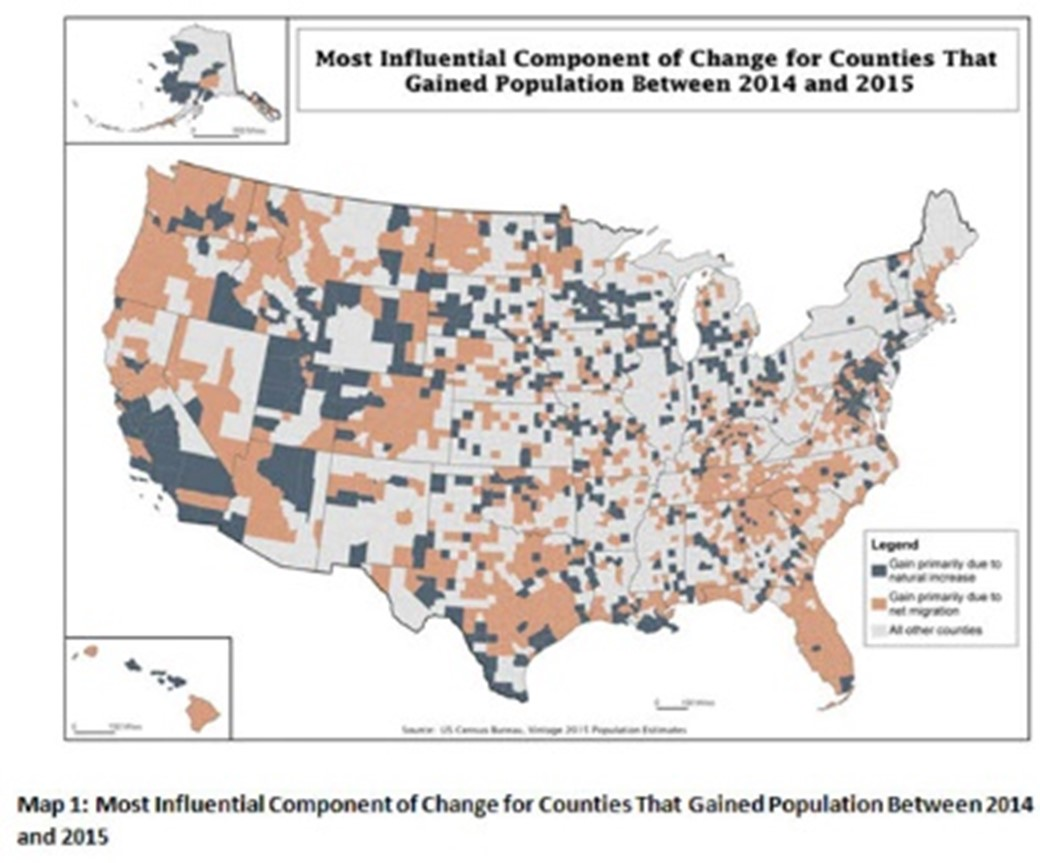
Most Influential Component of Change for US Counties That Gained Population Between 2014 and 2015

The trend of RNI over time can indicate what stage of the Demographic Transition Model (DTM) a region or country is in.

== National efforts to affect RNI ==
Government attempts to shape the RNI of a region or country are common around the world. Policies can either encourage or discourage an increase in birth rates. For example, during the COVID-19 crisis Singapore offered families a “pandemic baby bonus” to encourage a higher birth rate, therefore increasing RNI. The US has considered similar policies. Another example was China's one-child policy, intended to decrease birth rates, therefore decreasing the RNI.

A country with a good infrastructure to support families, women's health, and maternal/child health would likely have lower death rates from infant or maternal mortality, which would increase RNI.

== See also ==
- List of countries by rate of natural increase
- Birth rate
- Mortality rate
- Population growth
