= Demographics of the Marshall Islands =

The demographics of the Marshall Islands include data such as population density, ethnicity, health of the populace, economic status, religious affiliations and other aspects of the population.

Historical population figures for the Marshall Islands are unknown. In 1862, the population of the islands was estimated at 10,000. In 1960, the population of the Islands was approximately 15,000. The 2021 census counted 42,418 residents, 23,156 of whom (approximately 54.6%) lived on Majuro. 77.7% of the population lived in an urban setting on Majuro or Ebeye, the country's secondary urban center. The Marshallese census figures exclude Marshall Islanders who have relocated elsewhere; the Compact of Free Association allows them to freely relocate to the United States and obtain work there. Approximately 4,300 Marshall Islands natives relocated to Springdale, Arkansas in the United States; this figure represents the largest population concentration of Marshall Islands natives outside their island home.

Most residents of the Marshall Islands are Marshallese. Marshallese people are of Micronesian origin and are believed to have migrated from Asia to the Marshall Islands several thousand years ago. A minority of the Marshallese have Asian and European ancestry such as Japanese and German. A majority have Polynesian and Melanesian ancestry. About one-half of the nation's population lives in Majuro and Ebeye Atolls.

The official languages of the Marshall Islands are English and Marshallese. Both languages are widely spoken.

== Population ==
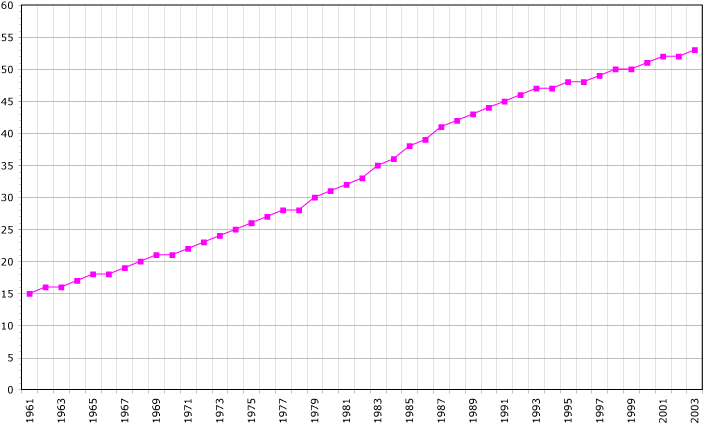
Demographics of the Marshall Islands, Data of FAO, year 2005; Number of inhabitants in thousands.

Historical population

Year	Pop.	±% p.a.
1920	9,800	—
1925	9,644	−0.32%
1930	10,412	+1.54%
1935	10,446	+0.07%
1958	13,928	+1.26%
1967	18,925	+3.47%

Year	Pop.	±% p.a.
1973	24,135	+4.14%
1980	30,873	+3.58%
1988	43,380	+4.34%
1999	50,840	+1.45%
2011	53,158	+0.37%
2021	42,418	−2.23%

- 77,917 (July 2020 est.)

=== Structure of the population ===
Population by Sex and Age Group (Census 03.IV.2011):

Age group	Male	Female	Total	%
Total	27 243	25 915	53 158	100
0–4	4 031	3 712	7 743	14.57
5–9	3 622	3 395	7 017	13.20
10–14	3 385	3 108	6 493	12.21
15–19	2 417	2 314	4 731	8.90
20–24	2 614	2 480	5 094	9.58
25–29	2 159	2 245	4 404	8.28
30–34	1 876	1 913	3 789	7.13
35–39	1 587	1 549	3 136	5.90
40–44	1 419	1 366	2 785	5.24
45–49	1 189	1 155	2 344	4.41
50–54	1 016	914	1 930	3.63
55–59	815	761	1 576	2.96
60–64	583	469	1 052	1.98
65-69	284	283	522	0.98
70-74	131	119	250	0.47
75-79	62	90	152	0.29
80-84	31	61	92	0.17
85-89	21	15	36	0.07
90-94	1	11	12	0.02
95+	0	0	0	0
Age group	Male	Female	Total	Percent
0–14	11 038	10 215	21 253	39.98
15–64	15 675	15 121	30 796	57.93
65+	530	579	1 109	2.09

== Vital statistics ==
=== Registrered births and deaths ===
Year	Population	Live births	Deaths	Natural increase	Crude birth rate	Crude death rate	Rate of natural increase	TFR
1988	43,380							7.2
1999	50,840	2,125			41.8	4.9	36.9	5.71
2011	53,158	1,641			32.1	3.7	28.4	4.05
2021	42,418	704						3.4

== Ethnic groups ==
- Marshallese: 92.1%
- Mixed Marshallese: 5.9%
- Other: 2% (2006)

== Languages ==
- Marshallese (official): 98.2%
- other languages 1.8%

== Religion ==
Major religious groups in the Republic of the Marshall Islands include the United Church of Christ – Congregational in the Marshall Islands, with 51.5% of the population; the Assemblies of God, 24.2%; the Roman Catholic Church, 8.4%; and The Church of Jesus Christ of Latter-day Saints (Mormons), 8.3%. Also represented are Bukot Nan Jesus (also known as Assembly of God Part Two), 2.2%; Baptist, 1.0%; Seventh-day Adventists, 0.9%; Full Gospel, 0.7%; and the Baháʼí Faith, 0.6%. Persons without any religious affiliation account for a very small percentage of the population. Islam is also present through Ahmadiyya Muslim Community which is based in Majuro, with the first mosque opening in the capital in September 2012.
