= Demographics of San Marino =

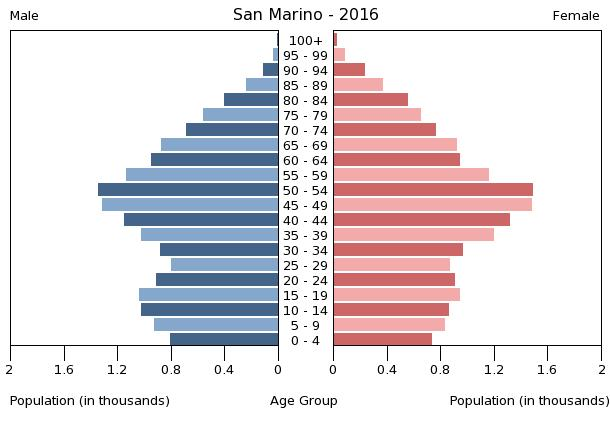
Population pyramid of San Marino in 2016

The demographics of San Marino include population density, ethnicity, education level, economic status, religious affiliations and other aspects of the population.

The population of San Marino consists of native Sammarinese and Italian citizens. Crop farming, sheep farming, and the working of stone from the quarries formed the early backbone of San Marino's economy. It has no mineral resources and most of the land is cultivated or covered by woods.

== Population size and structure ==
=== Structure of the population ===
Population Estimates by Sex and Age Group (01.I.2021) (Population statistics are compiled from registers.):

Age group	Male	Female	Total	%
Total	16 982	17 823	34 805	100
0–4	623	610	1 233	3.54
5–9	812	776	1 588	4.56
10–14	918	866	1 784	5.13
15–19	942	800	1 742	5.01
20–24	910	815	1 725	4.96
25–29	828	819	1 647	4.73
30–34	861	900	1 761	5.06
35–39	1 017	1 038	2 055	5.90
40–44	1 210	1 387	2 597	7.46
45–49	1 487	1 600	3 087	8.87
50–54	1 543	1 673	3 216	9.24
55–59	1 473	1 539	3 012	8.65
60–64	1 157	1 208	2 365	6.80
65-69	904	972	1 876	5.39
70-74	841	891	1 732	4.98
75-79	610	703	1 313	3.77
80-84	462	559	1 021	2.93
85-89	259	411	670	1.93
90-94	100	195	295	0.85
95-99	25	53	78	0.22
100+	0	8	8	0.02
Age group	Male	Female	Total	Percent
0–14	2 353	2 252	4 605	13.23
15–64	11 428	11 779	23 207	66.68
65+	3 201	3 792	6 993	20.09

== Vital statistics ==
	Average population	Live births	Deaths	Natural change	Crude birth rate (per 1000)	Crude death rate (per 1000)	Natural change (per 1000)	Total fertility rate
1947	12,100	280	143	137	23.1	11.8	11.3	
1948	12,300	257	107	150	21.4	8.9	12.5	
1949	12,400	271	102	169	21.9	8.2	13.7	
1950	12,800	233	118	115	18.2	9.2	9.0	
1951	13,000	233	91	142	17.9	7.0	10.9	
1952								
1953								
1954								
1955								
1956								
1957								
1958								
1959								
1960	15,400	260	133	127	16.9	8.6	8.3	
1961	15,600	301	123	178	19.3	7.9	11.4	
1962	16,700	293	126	167	17.5	7.5	10.0	
1963	17,000	286	116	170	16.8	6.8	10.0	
1964	17,300	298	149	149	17.2	8.6	8.6	
1965	17,400	286	148	138	16.4	8.5	7.9	
1966	17,700	314	134	180	17.7	7.6	10.1	
1967	17,900	303	129	174	16.9	7.2	9.7	
1968	18,300	310	156	154	16.9	8.5	8.4	
1969	18,800	308	141	167	16.4	7.5	8.9	
1970	17,800	288	133	155	16.2	7.5	8.7	
1971	18,400	327	145	182	17.8	7.9	9.9	
1972	18,700	309	138	171	16.5	7.4	9.1	
1973	19,000	328	146	182	17.3	7.7	9.6	
1974	19,300	294	148	146	15.2	7.7	7.5	
1975	19,800	280	159	121	14.1	8.0	6.1	
1976	20,100	297	136	161	14.8	6.8	8.0	
1977	20,500	291	136	155	14.2	6.6	7.6	
1978	20,800	283	156	127	13.6	7.5	6.1	
1979	21,000							
1980	21,300	239	166	73	11.2	7.8	3.4	
1981	21,800	217	163	54	10.0	7.5	2.5	
1982	21,900	237	157	80	10.8	7.2	3.6	
1983	22,000	245	163	82	11.1	7.4	3.7	
1984	22,200	223	156	67	10.0	7.0	3.0	
1985	22,300	207	188	19	9.3	8.4	0.9	
1986	22,500	179	171	8	8.0	7.6	0.4	
1987	22,600	220	154	66	9.7	6.8	2.9	
1988	22,700	242	187	55	10.7	8.2	2.5	
1989	22,900	231	173	58	10.1	7.6	2.5	
1990	23,100	266	155	111	11.5	6.7	4.8	
1991	23,400	257	171	86	11.0	7.3	3.7	
1992	23,800	237	172	65	10.0	7.2	2.8	
1993	24,100	244	145	99	10.1	6.0	4.1	
1994	24,500	268	184	84	10.9	7.5	3.4	
1995	24,900	244	186	58	9.8	7.5	2.3	
1996	25,300	282	173	109	11.1	6.8	4.3	
1997	25,700	287	178	109	11.2	6.9	4.3	
1998	26,100	285	190	95	10.9	7.3	3.6	
1999	26,400	303	198	105	11.5	7.5	4.0	
2000	26,800	290	188	102	10.8	7.0	3.8	
2001	26,941	315	195	120	11.4	7.1	4.3	
2002	28,166	295	203	92	10.4	7.1	3.2	
2003	28,753	300	216	84	10.3	7.5	2.9	1.250
2004	29,241	306	185	121	10.4	6.3	4.1	1.255
2005	29,673	284	219	65	9.5	7.3	2.2	1.184
2006	29,999	302	225	77	10.0	7.5	2.6	1.244
2007	30,368	292	225	67	9.6	7.4	2.2	1.235
2008	30,792	349	190	159	11.3	6.1	5.1	1.551
2009	31,269	306	233	73	9.7	7.4	2.3	1.334
2010	31,632	334	222	112	10.5	7.0	3.5	1.467
2011	31,888	325	222	103	10.1	6.9	3.2	1.470
2012	32,193	292	237	55	9.0	7.3	1.7	1.359
2013	32,471	320	247	73	9.9	7.6	2.3	1.520
2014	32,572	296	252	44	9.1	7.7	1.3	1.530
2015	32,789	269	235	34	8.2	7.2	1.0	1.362
2016	33,005	262	253	9	7.9	7.6	0.3	1.403
2017	33,196	228	278	-50	6.9	8.4	-1.5	1.199
2018	33,328	235	244	-9	7.0	7.3	-0.3	1.291
2019	33,419	232	251	-19	6.9	7.5	-0.6	1.294
2020	33,574	224	343	-119	6.7	10.2	-3.5	1.266
2021	33,627	212	312	-100	6.3	9.3	-3.0	1.206
2022	33,698	205	263	-58	6.1	7.8	-1.7	1.179
2023	33,812	191	279	-88	5.6	8.3	-2.7	1.080
2024	33,908	144	254	-110	4.4	7.5	-3.1	0.824
2025	34,045	166	277	-111	4.9	8.1	-3.2	0.91
2026								0.77 (e)

e=estimation based on births in the registered months so far

=== Current vital statistics ===
Period	Live births	Deaths	Natural increase
January-September 2025	118	220	-103
January-September 2026	103	224	-121
Difference	▼ -15 (-12.71%)	▲ +4 (+1.82%)	▼ -18

== Ethnic groups ==
Sammarinese, Italian

== Languages ==
Italian (official), Sammarinese variety of Romagnol (not official)

== Religion ==
According to a 2021 report, the population is 91.5% Christian, 5.6% agnostic, 1.9% atheist, and 1% 'other'.
