= Demographics of Samoa =

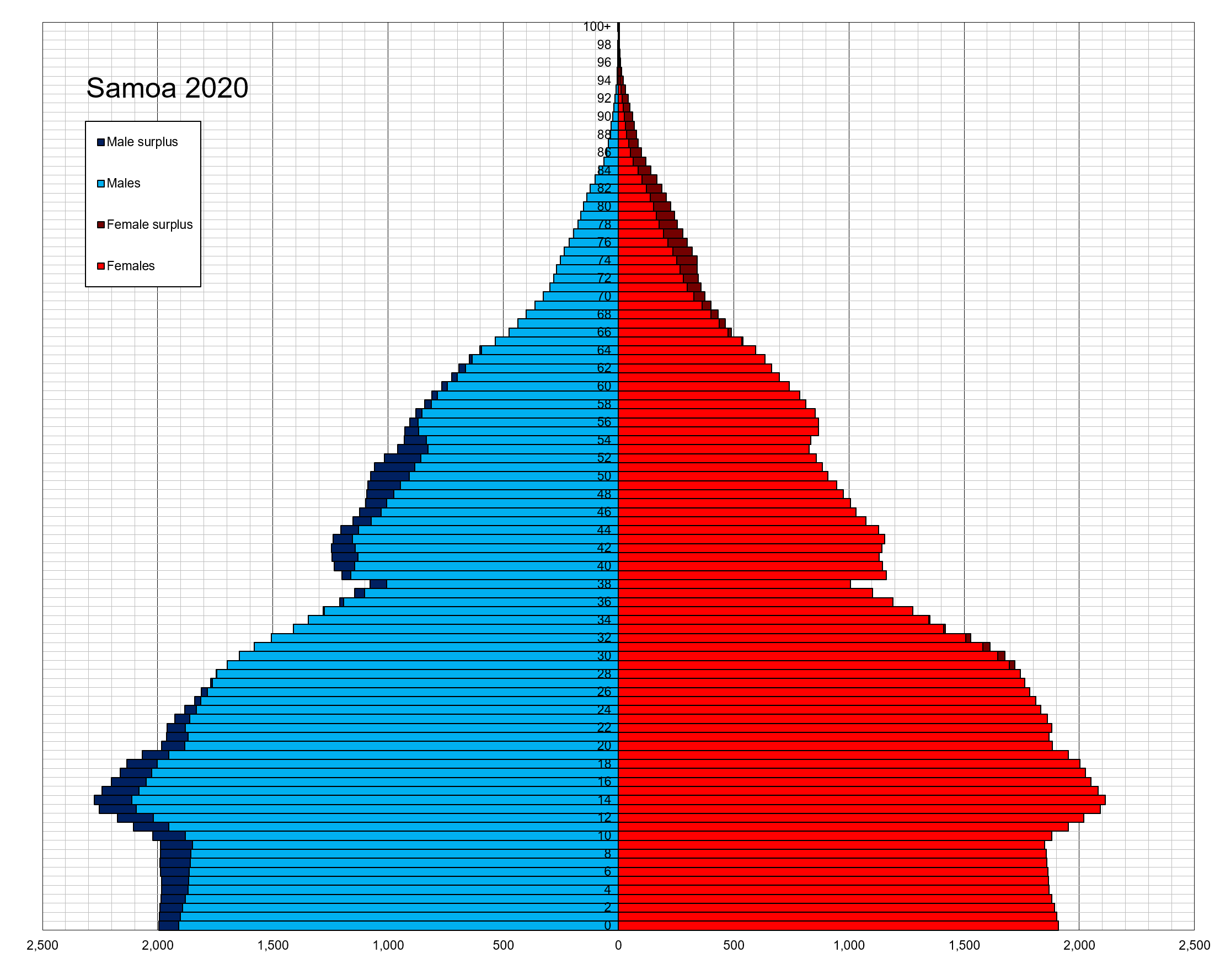
- Population pyramid of Samoa in 2020
- Population: 206,179 (2022 est.)
- Growth rate: 0.63% (2022 est.)
- Birth rate: 19.21 births/1,000 population (2022 est.)
- Death rate: 5.37 deaths/1,000 population (2022 est.)
- Life expectancy: 75.19 years
  - male: 72.28 years
  - female: 78.25 years
- Fertility rate: 2.42 children born/woman (2022 est.)
- Infant mortality rate: 18 deaths/1,000 live births
- Net migration rate: -7.51 migrant(s)/1,000 population (2022 est.)

Age structure
- 0–14 years: 29.31%
- 65 and over: 6.18%

Nationality
- Nationality: Samoan

Language
- Official: Samoan, English

Demographic features of the population of Samoa include population density, ethnicity, education level, health of the populace, economic status, religious affiliations and other aspects of the population.

== Population ==
Estimated population, fertility rate and net reproduction rate by year according to United Nations estimates

=== Structure of the population ===
Population by Sex and Age Group (Census 07.XI.2016):

Age group	Male	Female	Total	%
Total	100 892	95 087	195 979	100
0–4	14 601	13 558	28 159	14.37
5–9	13 151	11 868	25 019	12.77
10–14	11 056	10 382	21 438	10.94
15–19	9 968	8 984	18 952	9.67
20–24	8 184	7 735	15 919	8.12
25–29	6 700	6 632	13 332	6.80
30–34	6 051	5 865	11 916	6.08
35–39	5 564	5 235	10 799	5.51
40–44	5 333	4 919	10 252	5.23
45–49	5 240	4 534	9 774	4.99
50–54	4 336	4 112	8 448	4.31
55–59	3 658	3 352	7 010	3.58
60–64	2 667	2 558	5 225	2.67
65–69	1 702	1 773	3 475	1.77
70–74	1 267	1 421	2 688	1.37
75–79	746	1 004	1 750	0.89
80–84	365	646	1 011	0.52
85–89	163	313	476	0.24
90–94	48	111	159	0.08
95–99	6	21	27	0.01
100+	2	4	6	<0.01
Age group	Male	Female	Total	Percent
0–14	38 808	35 808	74 616	38.07
15–64	57 701	53 926	111 627	56.96
65+	4 299	5 293	9 592	4.89
unknown	84	60	144	0.07

Population Estimates by Sex and Age Group (01.I.2020):

Age group	Male	Female	Total	%
Total	104 014	98 493	202 506	100
0–4	15 120	14 103	29 223	14.43
5–9	14 153	12 446	26 599	13.13
10–14	10 703	10 272	20 975	10.36
15–19	9 630	8 633	18 262	9.02
20–24	8 571	8 217	16 788	8.29
25–29	6 779	7 005	13 784	6.81
30–34	6 136	6 079	12 214	6.03
35–39	5 427	5 309	10 737	5.30
40–44	5 118	4 987	10 105	4.99
45–49	5 773	4 711	10 484	5.18
50–54	4 632	4 514	9 146	4.52
55–59	4 179	3 716	7 895	3.90
60–64	3 199	3 024	6 223	3.07
65–69	1 780	1 776	3 556	1.76
70–74	1 331	1 462	2 793	1.38
75–79	777	1 044	1 821	0.90
80–84	350	633	983	0.49
85–89	152	302	454	0.22
90–94	66	136	202	0.10
95–99	5	23	28	0.01
100+	1	0	1	<0.01
Age group	Male	Female	Total	Percent
0–14	39 976	36 821	76 797	37.92
15–64	59 444	56 193	115 637	57.10
65+	4 462	5 376	9 838	4.86
unknown	132	103	235	0.12

== Vital statistics ==
=== Registered births and deaths ===
Year	Population	Live births	Deaths	Natural increase	Crude birth rate	Crude death rate	Rate of natural increase	TFR
1961	114,427							
1966	131,377							7.3
1971	146,647							7.4
1976	151,983							6.7
1981	156,349							
1986	157,408							5.6
1991	161,298							4.8
2001	176,710	5,065			29.0			4.4
2006	180,741	4,935	728	4,207	27.3	4.0	23.3	4.2
2011	187,820	5,703	828	4,875	30.4	4.4	26.0	4.7
2016	195,979	4,835	853	3,982	24.7	4.4	20.3	3.8
2021	205,557	4,056			19.7	4.5	15.2	3.0

=== Demographic and Health Surveys ===
Fertility Rate (TFR) (Wanted Fertility Rate) and CBR (Crude Birth Rate):

Year	Total		Urban		Rural	
Year	CBR	TFR	CBR	TFR	CBR	TFR
2009	28.6	4.6 (3.5)	28.1	4.1 (3.1)	28.7	4.7 (3.6)

=== UN estimates ===
The Population Department of the United Nations prepared the following estimates. Population estimates account for under numeration in population censuses.

	Mid-year population	Live births	Deaths	Natural change	Crude birth rate (per 1000)	Crude death rate (per 1000)	Natural change (per 1000)	Total fertility rate (TFR)	Infant mortality (per 1000 live births)	Life expectancy (in years)
1950	87,951	4,509	1,503	3,006	50.9	17.0	33.9	7.39	108.7	47.73
1951	89,907	4,610	1,505	3,105	51.0	16.6	34.3	7.44	106.0	48.38
1952	91,942	4,720	1,502	3,218	51.0	16.2	34.8	7.49	103.2	49.07
1953	93,972	4,821	1,495	3,326	50.9	15.8	35.1	7.52	100.3	49.81
1954	95,999	4,917	1,489	3,428	50.8	15.4	35.4	7.56	97.3	50.50
1955	98,037	5,004	1,483	3,521	50.7	15.0	35.6	7.58	94.1	51.14
1956	100,301	5,089	1,471	3,618	50.4	14.6	35.9	7.61	90.9	51.86
1957	103,087	5,192	1,453	3,739	50.2	14.1	36.1	7.63	87.7	52.62
1958	106,345	5,271	1,463	3,808	49.5	13.7	35.7	7.65	84.6	53.32
1959	109,811	5,389	1,458	3,931	49.0	13.2	35.7	7.68	81.6	54.00
1960	113,335	5,460	1,448	4,012	48.1	12.7	35.3	7.65	78.7	54.69
1961	116,820	5,545	1,442	4,103	47.3	12.3	35.0	7.64	75.8	55.32
1962	120,163	5,617	1,449	4,168	46.6	12.0	34.6	7.65	73.3	55.89
1963	123,416	5,658	1,407	4,251	45.7	11.4	34.3	7.66	70.9	56.46
1964	126,582	5,703	1,639	4,064	44.9	12.9	32.0	7.67	75.2	53.60
1965	129,789	5,707	1,339	4,368	43.8	10.3	33.5	7.65	66.6	57.54
1966	132,976	5,743	1,325	4,418	43.0	9.9	33.0	7.63	64.7	57.92
1967	135,752	5,755	1,294	4,461	42.1	9.5	32.6	7.61	62.2	58.55
1968	138,154	5,798	1,275	4,523	41.6	9.2	32.5	7.59	59.9	59.08
1969	140,457	5,845	1,253	4,592	41.3	8.9	32.4	7.55	57.6	59.64
1970	142,771	5,851	1,232	4,619	40.7	8.6	32.1	7.46	55.2	60.18
1971	145,064	5,825	1,211	4,614	39.8	8.3	31.5	7.34	52.9	60.70
1972	147,332	5,809	1,191	4,618	39.1	8.0	31.1	7.18	50.7	61.23
1973	149,587	5,789	1,171	4,618	38.4	7.8	30.6	7.02	48.5	61.75
1974	152,240	5,779	1,153	4,626	37.8	7.5	30.2	6.85	46.3	62.25
1975	155,263	5,796	1,148	4,648	37.1	7.4	29.8	6.68	44.2	62.76
1976	158,136	5,783	1,148	4,635	36.3	7.2	29.1	6.53	42.2	63.21
1977	160,362	5,742	1,147	4,595	35.5	7.1	28.4	6.38	40.3	63.64
1978	161,988	5,763	1,135	4,628	35.2	6.9	28.3	6.23	38.5	64.00
1979	163,489	5,785	1,120	4,665	35.0	6.8	28.3	6.08	36.8	64.39
1980	164,905	5,772	1,105	4,667	34.6	6.6	28.0	5.93	35.2	64.75
1981	166,190	5,764	1,091	4,673	34.3	6.5	27.8	5.78	33.8	65.10
1982	166,885	5,785	1,080	4,705	34.2	6.4	27.8	5.66	32.5	65.42
1983	166,944	5,799	1,072	4,727	34.2	6.3	27.9	5.53	31.3	65.74
1984	166,779	5,791	1,062	4,729	34.2	6.3	27.9	5.42	30.2	66.05
1985	166,517	5,786	1,054	4,732	34.2	6.2	28.0	5.34	29.1	66.35
1986	166,365	5,762	1,046	4,716	34.1	6.2	27.9	5.29	28.0	66.62
1987	166,773	5,682	1,039	4,643	33.7	6.2	27.5	5.19	27.1	66.88
1988	167,452	5,658	1,029	4,629	33.4	6.1	27.3	5.09	26.2	67.19
1989	167,886	5,599	1,018	4,581	32.9	6.0	26.9	4.99	25.4	67.47
1990	168,186	5,552	1,014	4,538	32.6	6.0	26.6	4.93	24.9	67.66
1991	168,701	5,501	1,007	4,494	32.2	5.9	26.3	4.89	24.3	67.88
1992	169,799	5,554	984	4,570	32.4	5.7	26.7	4.89	23.3	68.39
1993	171,362	5,644	979	4,665	32.6	5.7	27.0	4.87	22.6	68.70
1994	173,107	5,731	977	4,754	32.8	5.6	27.2	4.85	21.8	68.98
1995	174,902	5,776	971	4,805	32.7	5.5	27.2	4.80	21.1	69.30
1996	176,713	5,799	968	4,831	32.5	5.4	27.1	4.74	20.4	69.59
1997	178,543	5,790	964	4,826	32.2	5.4	26.8	4.66	19.7	69.88
1998	180,385	5,787	960	4,827	31.8	5.3	26.5	4.61	19.1	70.17
1999	182,211	5,767	956	4,811	31.4	5.2	26.2	4.56	18.4	70.46
2000	184,008	5,752	953	4,799	31.0	5.1	25.9	4.51	17.8	70.75
2001	185,530	5,708	951	4,757	30.5	5.1	25.4	4.47	17.3	71.02
2002	186,630	5,644	949	4,695	29.9	5.0	24.9	4.43	16.9	71.28
2003	187,440	5,611	958	4,653	29.6	5.1	24.6	4.40	16.6	71.50
2004	188,073	5,578	967	4,611	29.3	5.1	24.3	4.38	16.4	71.70
2005	188,626	5,551	986	4,565	29.1	5.2	23.9	4.37	16.4	71.75
2006	189,379	5,526	988	4,538	28.9	5.2	23.7	4.37	16.2	72.02
2007	190,478	5,547	1,003	4,544	28.9	5.2	23.6	4.39	16.3	72.10
2008	191,787	5,667	1,013	4,654	29.3	5.2	24.1	4.47	16.3	72.16
2009	193,176	5,803	1,182	4,621	29.8	6.1	23.7	4.55	18.5	70.07
2010	194,672	5,929	1,036	4,893	30.2	5.3	24.9	4.61	16.3	72.25
2011	196,351	6,033	1,051	4,982	30.5	5.3	25.2	4.64	16.2	72.26
2012	198,124	6,090	1,073	5,017	30.5	5.4	25.1	4.61	16.4	72.17
2013	199,939	6,077	1,068	5,009	30.2	5.3	24.9	4.53	16.0	72.39
2014	201,757	6,060	1,075	4,985	29.8	5.3	24.5	4.44	15.8	72.46
2015	203,571	6,031	1,083	4,948	29.4	5.3	24.1	4.36	15.7	72.52
2016	205,544	5,990	1,095	4,895	28.9	5.3	23.7	4.27	15.5	72.54
2017	207,630	5,974	1,106	4,868	28.6	5.3	23.3	4.18	15.3	72.59
2018	209,701	5,957	1,118	4,839	28.2	5.3	22.9	4.11	15.1	72.64
2019	211,905	5,946	1,172	4,774	27.9	5.5	22.4	4.05	15.3	72.16
2020	214,929	5,952	1,143	4,809	27.6	5.3	22.3	4.00	14.4	72.77
2021	218,764	5,975	1,171	4,804	27.3	5.3	21.9	3.93	14.1	72.77

== Ethnic groups ==
- Samoan 96%
- Dual Samoan-New Zealander 2%
- Other 1.9%

== Languages ==
- Samoan (Official)
- English

== Religions ==
- Protestant 57.4%
  - Congregationalist 31.8%
  - Methodist 13.7%
  - Assembly of God 8%,
  - Seventh-Day Adventist 3.9%
- Roman Catholic 19.4%
- Mormon 15.2%
- Worship Centre 1.7%
- Other Christian 5.5%
- Other 0.7%
- None 0.1%,
- Unspecified 0.1%
