= Population change =

Change in number of people in an area over time

Population change is simply the change in the number of people in a specified area during a specific time period. Demographics (or demography) is the study of population statistics, their variation and its causes. These statistics include birth rates, death rates (and hence life expectancy), migration rates and sex ratios. All of these statistics are investigated by censuses and surveys conducted over a period of time. Some demographic information can also be obtained from historical maps, and aerial photographs.

A major purpose of demography is to inform government and business planning of the resources that will be required as a result of population changes.

== Population trends ==
The change in total population over a period is equal to the number of births, minus the number of deaths, plus or minus the net amount of migration in a population. The number of births can be projected as the number of females at each relevant age multiplied by the assumed fertility rate. The number of deaths can be projected as the sum of the numbers of each age and sex in the population multiplied by their respective mortality rates. For many centuries, the overall population of the world changed relatively slowly: very broadly, the numbers of births were balanced by numbers of deaths (including high rates of infant mortality). Infant mortality was high for various reasons such as ignorance, insufficient health facilities, and sometimes lack of food. Occasionally, farmers were unable to produce enough food for the population, resulting in death from starvation. However more recently, and especially in the 20th and 21st centuries, due to growth in technology, education, and medical care, the world population has increased rapidly, as many more people have survived to child-bearing age. Natural resources that were once scarce are now being mass-produced. Because of this increase, some countries have adopted policies to try to control population growth. These policies include active measures to reduce the numbers of births (e.g. "one-child policy") as well as education. In many countries, fertility rates have declined, due to better education, better available birth control, better pension provision reducing economic dependence on one's children in old age, and in response to lower infant mortality. Those who wait until they are older before starting a family may find it more difficult to do so as fertility declines with age. One of the biological reasons for this is abnormal chromosome segregation during cell division in older eggs. In some parts of society there are also now more women formally employed in the workforce. Recent studies show that there has been a decline in fertility from the ages 25 to 29. In general, fertility rates have relatively decreased at ages under 30.

One way to visualize population change is to examine population pyramids. These display graphically how many people of each gender there are in each age bracket in a given population. (A pyramid with a wider base and a smaller top, thus a triangle shape, shows rapid population growth, while a more rectangular shape shows a more stable population.) Many countries have differently-shaped population pyramids, due to the factors discussed above, mainly historically different birth and death rates, and in some cases forced changes in population such as war, ethnic cleansing and genocide. Examples of population pyramids by year can be found here.

== See also ==
- Demographic transition
