= Babangluksa (film) =

Babang Luksa
- Film poster
- Directed by: Yuan Santiago
- Produced by: Aldrich Huang
- Starring: Angelika dela Cruz; Precious Lara Quigaman; Luis Alandy
- Edited by: Sarah Roxas
- Music by: Diwa de Leon
- Production company: Creativeminds Productions
- Distributed by: GMA Films
- Release date: November 2, 2011
- Country: Philippines
- Languages: English; Tagalog; Filipino
- Box office: ₱24,178,888

Babang Luksa is a 2011 Filipino independent suspense–horror–thriller film produced by Creative Minds Productions starring Precious Lara Quigaman, Luis Alandy and Angelika dela Cruz written and directed by Yuan Santiago.

== Story ==
A year after the violent death of Beatrice, Anna, a clairvoyant doctor and her lover Carlos start experiencing supernatural events. Anna thinks that Beatrice's ghost is haunting her and talks to her friend Cathy, who recommends her to an espiritista, Idang. Idang tells her that Beatrice, powered by her babang luksa, is possibly haunting Anna to exact her revenge, as Anna is the main cause of her suicide.

Anna performs a ritual to speak to Beatrice's spirit and pacify her anger. For a while, the haunting stops until their common friend, Kris dies. More perplexed than before, Anna consults Idang again, who tells her that it was not Beatrice's spirit that she called out but a sigbin. A spirit trapped within the portal of the mirror, a Sigbin will need to acquire five spirits that are close to the person who set it free, Anna. The only way to save them is to fulfill the power of a superstition (pamahiin). Despite Idang's intervention, Tita Soledad is killed next.

Unable to take back what she did, knocking on Beatrice's casket, Kris's soul is taken by the Sigbin. Anna, Carlo, Idang and Miguel rush to Beatrice's grave, but Miguel is taken by the Sigbin. Idang is also killed by the Sigbin for interfering with its will. Carlo digs up the body, and cut the rosary. They are momentarily relieved before Anna suffers a flashback and realizes that before they buried Beatrice, Carlo discreetly placed a rosary in the corpse's pocket. Then Carlo is suddenly taken. The screen cuts to black, and Anna's scream is heard.

== Cast ==
- Precious Lara Quigaman as Anna
- Angelika dela Cruz as Idang
- Luis Alandy as Carlos
- Roselle Nava as Cathy
- Helga Krapf as Kris
- Ces Quesada as Tita Soledad
- Joy Viado as Dra. Catacutan
- Joshua Ocampo as Miguel
- Arya Valdez as Beatrice / Sigbin
- Rachael Chezka Marie Decena as Sigbin

== See also ==
- List of ghost films
