= Demographics of the Philippines =

- Population pyramid of the Philippines as of 2020 census
- Population: 112,729,484 (2024 census)
- Growth rate: 0.80% (2020–2024)
- Birth rate: 12.4 births/1,000 population (2021)
- Death rate: 8.0 deaths/1,000 population (2021)
- Life expectancy: 72.66 years
  - male: 68.72 years
  - female: 74.74 years (2011 est.)
- Fertility rate: 1.7 children born/woman (2025 est.)
- Infant mortality: 24.0 deaths/1,000 live births
- Net migration rate: −1.29 migrant(s)/1,000 population (2011 est.)

Age structure
- 0–14 years: 29.98% (male 17,006,677/female 16,036,437)
- 15–64 years: 64.22% (male 35,879,693/female 34,885,763)
- 65 and over: 5.80% (male 2,754,813/female 3,635,271) (2021 est.)

Sex ratio
- Total: 1 male(s)/female
- At birth: 1.05 male(s)/female
- Under 15: 1.04 male(s)/female
- 15–64 years: 1 male(s)/female
- 65 and over: 0.76 male(s)/female

Nationality
- Nationality: Filipinos
- Major ethnic: Visayan (Cebuano, Waray, Hiligaynon/Ilonggo, Karay-a, Aklanon, Masbatenyo, Romblomanon) 31.6%, Tagalog 28.1% (2000 census)
- Minor ethnic: Ilocano 9%, Bikol 6%, Kapampangan 3%, Pangasinan 2%, Zamboangueño 1.5% & others 23.3% (2000 census)

Language
- Official: Filipino and English
- Spoken: Recognized regional languages: Tagalog, Cebuano, Ilocano, Hiligaynon, Bicolano, Waray, Kapampangan, Pangasinan, Maranao, Maguindanao, Zamboangueño Chavacano and Tausug; Protected auxiliary languages: Spanish and Arabic

Demographic features of the Philippines include population density, ethnicity, education level, health of the populace, economic status, religious affiliations, and other aspects of the population. The Philippines annualized population growth rate between the years 2020 and 2024 was 0.80%. According to the 2024 census, the population of the Philippines is 112,729,484. The first census in the Philippines was held in the year 1591 which counted 667,612 people.

The majority of Filipinos are lowland Austronesians, while the Aetas (Negritos), as well as other highland groups form a minority. The indigenous population is related to the indigenous populations of the Malay Archipelago. Some ethnic groups that have been in the Philippines for centuries before Spanish and American colonial rule have assimilated or intermixed. This is the case with the Sama-Bajau ethnicity which possess Austroasiatic ancestry and the Blaan people who possess Papuan ancestry, while ancient immigration integrated some Indian ancestry to the precolonial Indianized kingdoms in the islands. Meanwhile, Spanish era censuses from the 1700s, record that 2.33% of the population were Mexicans and 5% were mixed Spanish-Filipinos or pure Spanish-Filipinos. Records from the Philippine government shows that pure Chinese were 1.35 million and mixed Chinese-Filipinos composed about 20% of the population. Up to 750,000 people from the United States of America also live in the Philippines. They represent 0.75% of the total population, while an additional 250,000 about 0.25% of Filipinos are Amerasians of half Filipino and half American descent. Thus making the percentage of the population having either full or partial American descent amount to 1% of the Philippines' demographics. Other ethnic groups include the Arabs who intermixed with Muslim Filipinos and the Japanese who form parts of the population.

The most commonly spoken indigenous languages are Tagalog and Cebuano, with 23.8 million (45 million speakers as Filipino) and 16 million speakers, respectively. Nine other indigenous languages have at least one million native speakers: Ilocano, Hiligaynon, Waray, Bicolano, Kapampangan, Pangasinan, Maranao, Maguindanao, and Tausug. One or more of these are spoken as a mother tongue by more than 93% of the population. Filipino and English are the official languages, but there are between 120 and 170 distinct indigenous Philippine languages (depending on expert classifications).

== Population history ==
The historical population of the Philippines

Philippines population density map per province as of 2009 per square kilometer: 0–50 51–100 101–200 201–300 301–400 401–800 801–1600

=== 1591 ===
The first census in the Philippines was in 1591, based on tributes collected. The books counted the total population of the Spanish Philippines as 667,612 people; by 1591 most of the Philippines were under Spanish rule. 20,000 were Chinese migrant traders, at different times: around 15,600 individuals were Latino soldier-colonists who were cumulatively sent from Peru and Mexico and they were shipped to the Philippines annually, 3,000 were Japanese residents, and 600 were pure Spaniards from Europe. There was a large but unknown number of South Asian Filipinos, as the majority of the slaves imported into the archipelago were from Bengal and India, adding Dravidian and Indo-Aryan speaking South Indians and Indo-European speaking Bengalis into the ethnic mix.

The rest were Austronesians and Negritos. With 667,612 people, during this era, the Philippines was among the most sparsely populated lands in Asia. In contrast, Japan during that era (the 1500s) had a population of 8 million and Mexico had a population of 4 million, which was huge compared to the Philippine's 600,000. In 1600, the method of population counting was revamped by the Spanish officials, who then based the counting of the population through church records.

The 1591 census divided territories into provinces and further into encomiendas, the latter corresponding to modern-day towns and villages in the Philippines. By province, the populations included 30,640 for Manila (including Maragondon and Cavite), 75,000 for Pampanga (including Bataan and Bulacan), 24,000 for Pangasinan, 97,000 for Cagayan (including the Babuyan Islands, Calayan, and Camiguing), 68,520 for Ilocos, 48,000 for La Laguna (including Morong), 86,640 for Bicol and the Camarines, 70,000 for Panay (including Guimaras, Tablas, Cabuyan, and Cuyo), 22,000 for Calilaya, 10,000 for the Calamianes, and 65,000 for Cebu (the province including not only the island itself but also Masbate, Burias, Leyte, Negros, and parts of Mindanao, along with other small islands like Mactan). The interiors of the larger islands like Luzon were almost completely uninhabited.

Stephanie J. Mawson, by rummaging through records in the archives of Mexico discovered that the Spaniards were not the only immigrant group to the Philippines; Peru and Mexico too sent soldiers to the islands, and in fact outnumbered the Spaniards who immigrated to the Philippines.

Geographic distribution and year of settlement of the Latin-American immigrant soldiers assigned to the Philippines in the 1600s
Location	1603	1636	1642	1644	1654	1655	1670	1672
Manila	900	446	—	407	821	799	708	667
Fort Santiago	—	22	—	—	50	—	86	81
Cavite	—	70	—	—	89	—	225	211
Cagayan	46	80	—	—	—	—	155	155
Calamianes	—	—	—	—	—	—	73	73
Caraga	—	45	—	—	—	—	81	81
Cebu	86	50	—	—	—	—	135	135
Formosa	—	180	—	—	—	—	—	—
Moluccas	80	480	507	—	389	—	—	—
Otón	66	50	—	—	—	—	169	169
Zamboanga	—	210	—	—	184	—	—	—
Other	255	—	—	—	—	—	—	—
Total reinforcements	1,533	1,633	2,067	2,085	n/a	n/a	1,632	1,572

In 1798, the population of Luzon or Luconia was estimated to be around 600,000 with the other islands, unknown. 200,000 of the 600,000 population were of mixed-raced descent of either Spanish, Chinese or Latin-American admixture. 5,000 enlisted soldiers on that year, were of South American descent, while 2,500 were pure Spanish officers. There were 20,000 new Chinese immigrants. The book, "Intercolonial Intimacies Relinking Latin/o America to the Philippines, 1898–1964 By Paula C. Park" citing "Forzados y reclutas: los criollos novohispanos en Asia (1756–1808)" gave a higher number of later Mexican soldier-immigrants to the Philippines, pegging the number at 35,000 immigrants in the 1700s in a population of only 1.5 million, thus forming 2.33% of the population.

In 1799, Friar Manuel Buzeta estimated the population of all the Philippine islands as 1,502,574. Despite the number of Mixed Spanish-Filipino descent being the lowest, they may be more common than expected as many Spaniards often had Filipino concubines and mistresses and they frequently produced children out of wedlock.

In the late 1700s to early 1800s, Joaquín Martínez de Zúñiga, an Agustinian Friar from Spain, in his Two Volume Book: "Estadismo de las islas Filipinas" compiled a census of the Spanish-Philippines based on the tribute counts (Which represented an average family of seven to ten children and two parents, per tribute) and came upon the following statistics:

Data reported for the 1800 as divided by ethnicity and province
Province	Native Tributes	Spanish Mestizo Tributes	All Tributes (Note: Including others such as Latin-Americans and Chinese-Mestizos, pure Chinese paid tribute but were not Philippine citizens as they were transients who returned to China, and Spaniards were exempt)
Tondo	14,437-1/2	3,528	27,897-7
Cavite	5,724-1/2	859	9,132-4
Laguna	14,392-1/2	336	19,448-6
Batangas	15,014	451	21,579-7
Mindoro	3,165	3-1/2	4,000-8
Bulacan	16,586-1/2	2,007	25,760-5
Pampanga	16,604-1/2	2,641	27,358-1
Bataan	3,082	619	5,433
Zambales	1,136	73	4,389
Ilocos	44,852-1/2	631	68,856
Pangasinan	19,836	719-1/2	25,366
Cagayan	9,888	0	11,244-6
Camarines	19,686-1/2	154-1/2	24,994
Albay	12,339	146	16,093
Tayabas	7,396	12	9,228
Cebu	28,112-1/2	625	28,863
Samar	3,042	103	4,060
Leyte	7,678	37-1/2	10,011
Caraga	3,497	0	4,977
Misamis	1,278	0	1,674
Negros Island	5,741	0	7,176
Iloilo	29,723	166	37,760
Capiz	11,459	89	14,867
Antique	9,228	0	11,620
Calamianes	2,289	0	3,161
TOTAL	299,049	13,201	424,992-16

The Spanish-Filipino population as a proportion of the provinces widely varied; with as high as 19% of the population of Tondo province (The most populous province and former name of Manila), to Pampanga 13.7%, Cavite at 13%, Laguna 2.28%, Batangas 3%, Bulacan 10.79%, Bataan 16.72%, Ilocos 1.38%, Pangasinan 3.49%, Albay 1.16%, Cebu 2.17%, Samar 3.27%, Iloilo 1%, Capiz 1%, Bicol 20%, and Zamboanga 40%. According to the data, in the Archdiocese of Manila which administers much of Luzon under it, about 10% of the population was Spanish-Filipino. Summing up all the provinces including those with no Spanish Filipinos, all in all, in the total population of the Philippines, Spanish Filipinos and mixed Spanish-Filipinos composed 5% of the population.

Meanwhile, government records show that 20% of the Philippines' total population were either pure Chinese or Mixed Chinese-Filipinos.

There was also the 1818 Tribute count by Buzeta and Bravo as outlined below.

Felipe Bravo Census Demographics (Albay, 1818)
Provinces	Pueblos	Native Families	Spanish Filipino Families	Negrito Families	Chinese Filipino Families
Albay	Albay, Cabicera	5,515		2	2
	Manito	240	4		
	Bacon	2,119	45		
	Cuba	2,162	52		
	Casiguran	1,025	28		
	Juban	396	18		
	Sorsogon	1,783	149		
	Bulusan	1,777	19		
	Bulan	714	16		
	Donsol	241			
	Quipia	269			
	Lilog	821	33	23	
	Bacacay	1,295	77		
	Malilipot	981	53		
	Tabaco	3,347	225		
	Malitao	2,844	241		
	Tibi	2,069	157	110	
	Lagonoy y su anejo	1,669	18	521	
	San Jose	1,829	114	470	
	Caramoan	641		72	
Total		31,737	1,249	1,198	2

Felipe Bravo Census Demographics (Isla De Ticao, 1818)
Provinces	Pueblos	Native Families	Spanish Filipino Families	Negrito Families	Chinese Filipino Families
Isla de Ticao	San Jacinto	266	8		
Total		266	8		

Felipe Bravo Census Demographics (Isla De Masbate, 1818)
Provinces	Pueblos	Native Families	Spanish Filipino Families	Negrito Families	Chinese Filipino Families
Isla de Masbate	Mobo	912	1		
Total		912	1		

Felipe Bravo Census Demographics (Isla De Catanduanes, 1818)
Provinces	Pueblos	Native Families	Spanish Filipino Families	Negrito Families	Chinese Filipino Families
Isla De Catanduanes	Virac	1,581	91		
	Calolbon	847	3		
	Eiga	847	3		
	Payo y sus anejos Bagamanoc y Ooc	644	17		
	Pandan y Caramoan	489	2		
Total		4,408	116		

Felipe Bravo Census Demographics (Antique, 1818)
Provinces	Pueblos	Native Families	Spanish Filipino Families	Chinese Filipino Families
Antique	San José de Buenavista, cabecera	5,925	6	
	San Pedro de Balbalan	2,247		
	Sibalom	4,665	2	
	Patnongon y su visita Coritan	2,097	3	
	Bugason	3,060	1	
	San Antonio de Nalupa, su anejo Culari y visitas Tibiao, Bitad, Tun, Bacafan y Batunan	2,542	19	
	Pandan	300		
	Antique	2,304	12	
	Dao	1,296	7	
	Cagayan Chico en la isla del mismo nombre	527		
Total	(Across the Province)	24,963	50	40

Felipe Bravo Census Demographics (Bataan, 1818)
Provinces	Pueblos	Native Families	Spanish Filipino Families	Moreno Filipino Families	Negro (Black) Filipino Families	Chinese Filipino Families
Bataan	Balanga, cabecera	1,608	12		18	8
	Abucay	1,406	20		3	5
	Samar	1,000	4		1	
	Orani	1,000	25			8
	Llana-Hermosa	716	1			
	San Juan de Dinalupijan	451	19		7	3
	Pilar	899				
	Mariveles y su visita Morong	1,522	3	1	5	
	Orion ú Odiong	1,550	8	2	18	3
Total		10,152	92	3	52	27

Felipe Bravo Census Demographics (Batangas, 1818)
Provinces	Pueblos	Native Families	Spanish Filipino Families	Chinese Filipino Families
Batangas	Balayan, cabecera.	4,521	22	
	Lian.	629	7	
	Nasugbů.	866		2
	Rosario	1,758	4	
	Santo Tomas.	1,256		
	San Pablo de los Montes	1,948	7	
	Taal	8,312		
	Baoan ó Banang	5,813		
	Batangas	6,889		
	San José	2,427		
	Tanauan.	2,106		
	Lipa	4,104		
Total		40,629	40	2

Felipe Bravo Census Demographics (Bulacan, 1818)
Provinces	Pueblos	Native Families	Spanish Filipino Families	Converted Negro Families	Chinese Filipino Families
Bulacan	Bulacan, cabecera.	5,200			
	Bigáa.	1,876			
	Guiguinto.	1,291			
	Malolos.	8,110			
	Paombon.	1,058			
	Hagonoy.	4,572			
	Calumpít.	2,628			
	Quingua.	2,912			
	San Isidro.	2,560			
	Baliuag.	4,296			
	San Rafael.	1,650	10		
	Angat.	5,441			
	San José.	219			
	Santa María de Pandi.	1,588	17		
	Bocaue.	2,550	88		2
	Marilao.	881	28	5	1
	Meycauayan.	2,375	46		
	Polo.	3,160	44		4
	Obando.	2,493			
Total		54,360	233	5	7

Felipe Bravo Census Demographics (Cagayan, 1818)
Province	Pueblo	Native Families	Spanish Filipino Families
Cagayan	Lal-lo, cabecera.	975	313
	Camalaniugan.	1,156	
	Piat y su visita.	899	
	Tabang..	201	
	Cabagan.	3,543	
	Malaveg con su visita Mabanaug.	524	
	Tuao..	1,393	
	Iguig y su visita Amulong.	403	
	Tuguegarao.	5,072	
	Aparri..	1,715	
	Abulug.	1,162	1
	San Juan y su visita Masi.	913	
	Nasiping y su visita Gataran.	573	
	Ilagan..	1,150	
	Gamú y su visita Furao.	586	16
	Tumauini.	827	
	Bugay..	299	
	Aritao..	580	
	Dupax.	867	6
	Bambang..	893	
	Bayombong.	771	
	Lumabang.	332	
	Bagabag y su Fuerza.	508	
	Carig y su Fortaleza el Sto. Niño.	305	
	Camarag.	488	
	Angadanan.	320	
	Cauayan.	318	
	Calaniugan.	135	
TOTAL		26,726	336

Felipe Bravo Census Demographics (Calamianes, 1818)
Province	Pueblo	Native Families	Spanish Filipino Families
Islas de Calamianes
Calamianes	Culion en la de Calamianes, Isla de Linacapan, e Isla de Coron.	1,044	2
Isla de Paragua
	Taytay, Silanga, Meitejet, Pancol, Guinlo, y Barbacan.	1,424	4
Islas de Dumaran y Agutay
	Isla y pueblo de Dumaran e Isla y pueblo de Agutay.	632	
Islas de Cuyo
	Isla y pueblo de Cuyo y su anejo, Canipo, e Isla de Pagaguayan.	2,430	25
TOTAL		5,530	31

Felipe Bravo Census Demographics (Camarines, 1818)
Province	Pueblo	Native Families	Spanish Filipino Families	Lacandula Families	Negro Filipinos	Chinese Filipinos
Partido de Vicol (Ciudad de Nueva-Caceres)
Camarines	Tabaco y Santa Cruz.	3,593	301		4	3
	Naga.	956				
	Camaligan.	1,388				
	Canaman.	1,589				
	Magarao ó Mangarao.	1,862				
	Bombom ó Bonbon.	1,245				
	Quipayo.	784				
	Calabanga.	1,174				
	Libmanan ó Libnanan.	1,490	1			
	Milaor.	1,902	7			
	San Fernando.	688	2			
	Minalabag.	901				
Partido de la Rinconada
	Bula.	471				
	Bao ó Baao.	1,538	37		4	
	Nabua.	2,612	2		2	
	Iriga.	2,040	1			
	Buhi ó Buji.	1,979	10			
	Bato.	495				
Partido de la Iriga
	Libon.	410	4			
	Polangui.	2,903	15			
	Ors ú Oas.	3,614				
	Ligao.	2,968	24			
	Guinobatan.	2,605	1			
	Camalig.	2,330	39		9	
	Cagsava.	2,870				
Monte Isaroc
	Pueblo y Mision de Manguirin.	160			629	
	Goa, Tigabon y Tinambag.	1,123		2	625	
Partido de la Contra-Costa
	Sipocot, Lupi y Ragay.	406				
	Daet.	1,449	26		10	
	Talisay.	1,055	2			
	Indan.	675	6			
	Paracale.	697	34			
	Mambulao.	950				
	Capalonga.	137			4	
TOTAL		50,762	512	2	1,287	3

Felipe Bravo Census Demographics (Capiz, 1818)
Province	Pueblo	Native Families	Spanish Filipino Families	Lacandula Families	Negro Filipino families	Chinese Filipino families
Capiz	Capiz y su visita Ibisan.	2,650				
	Panay.	2,275				
	Panitan.	1,485				
	Dumalag y sus visitas Dao y Tapas.	3,158				
	Dumarao.	2,600				
	Mambusao y sus visitas Sigma y Jamindan.	1,924	13			
	Batan y su visita Sapiang.	2,255	56			
	Banga y su visita Madalag.	1,579	8			
	Malinao.	1,487	11			
	Calibo y su visita Macao.	2,700	167			
	Ibajay.	1,268	30			
Isla de Romblon
	Romblon.	1,514	15			
Isla de Sibuyan
	Cauit, Pagalar, y Cajidiocan.	1,114				
Isla de Banton
	Banton.					
Isla de Tablas
	Guintinguian, Aghagacay, Odiongan, Lanan, y Loog.					
Isla de Simara
	San José, Coloncolon.					
Isla del Maestre de Campo
	Sibali.					
TOTAL		26,009	285			

Felipe Bravo Census Demographics (Caraga, 1818)
Province	Pueblo	Native Families	Spanish Filipino Families	Lacandula Families	Negro Filipino families	Chinese Filipino families
Distrito de Surigao y Siargao
Caraga	Surigao (cabecera), Tagauan, Gigaquit ó Higaguit, Cabubungan, Isla y pueblo de Dinagat, Caco en la isla de Siargao, Dapa en dicha isla, Cabuntug en la misma isla, Sapao en la citada isla.	2,475	25			
Distrito de Butuan y Talacogon
	Butuan, Habungan, Tabay, Maynio, Talacogon.	1,593	10			
Distrito de Cantilan y Mision de San Juan
	Lutao, Hingoog, Cantilan, Tago, Tandac, Lianga y la Mision de San Juan.	1,155				
Distrito de Bislic y Mision de Caraga
	Jinatuan, Bislic, Catel, Bagangan y la Mision de Caraga.	955				
TOTAL		6,178	35			

Felipe Bravo Census Demographics (Cavite, 1818)
Province	Pueblo	Native Families	Spanish Filipino Families	Lacandula Families	Negro Filipino families	Morenos	Chinese Filipino families
Cavite	Plaza y puerto de Cavite.	221	153			5	100
	San Roque.	3,906	443			3	35
	Cavite viejo.	1,855	55				4
	Bacood ó Bacor.	1,729	19				4
	San Francisco de Malabon.	1,510	69				3
	Santa Cruz de Malabon.	2,090	3			1	2
	Pueblo y Hacienda de Nait.	942	3			4	2
	Marigondon.	2,043					3
	Indan.	2,759	36				2
	Silang.	2,255	6			1	4
	Imus.	2,015	125				5
TOTAL		21,325	912			14	164

Felipe Bravo Census Demographics (Cebu, 1818)
Province	Pueblo	Native Families	Spanish Filipino Families	Lacandula Families	Negro Filipino families	Chinese Filipino families
Isla de Cebu
Cebu	Cabecera, El Sto. Nombre de Jesus.	868	255			
	Parian, Yutaos y Sogod con la visita de este, Simugui.	1,795	109			
	San Nicolás y sus visits Talisay, Lipata, Tansan, y Pitao.	2,420				
	Opon y Talamban.	2,850				
	Mandave ó Mandaui.	2,729	20			
	Danao y Catmon.	2,656	57			
	Barili y sus visitas Duman, Jod, Malhual, Coston, Badian y Taiuran.	1,943	14			
	Samboan y sus visitas Jiratilan, Malabuyot, y Taburan.	2,496	69			
	Bolojon y sus visitas Tayon, Calob, Mambuji y Yunan.	2,420				
	Dalaguete.	2,556				
	Argao y Carcar.	3,250				
Isla de Bantayan
	Bantayan y sus visitas Octon y Davis, Daan, Bantayan y sus visits Sogod y Cavit.	2,169	75			
Isla de Siquijor
	Siquijor y su visita Canoan.	2,450	46			
Isla de Bohol
	Inabangan y sus visitas Pampan, Corte, Taoran, Canogon, Tubigon, Ipil, Talibon, Tabigui, Inbay, y Cabulao.	1,815	41			
	Gindulman y sus visitas Quimale y Cugton.	1,500	6			
	Jagna.	3,255				
	Dimiao.	2,016				
	Loay.	1,614	5			
	Lobog y su anejo S. Isidro.	3,852				
	Baclayon.	3,549	5			
	Tagbilaran.	2,370	2			
	Pimin-vitan.	1,414				
	Malabohoo.	2,269				
	Loon y su visita Catarbacan.	1,990				
	Calape y sus visitas Bintig y Mondoog.	1,932				
Isla de Davis
	Davis.	2,055	9			
	Panglao.	1,350				
Isla de Camotes
	Poro y sus visitas (administración de Mandave).					
TOTAL		60,305	638			

Felipe Bravo Census Demographics (Ilocos Norte, 1818)
Province	Pueblo	Native Families	Spanish Filipino Families	Lacandula Families	Negro Filipino families	Chinese Filipino families
Ilocos Norte	Bangui.	1,449	5			
	Nagpartian.	423				
	Pasuquin.	1,530				
	Bacarra.	4,901				
	Vintar.	2,064				
	Sarrat ó San Miguel de Cuning.	2,755				
	Pigdig y su visita Santiago.	4,015				
	Dingras.	4,559				
	Laoag.	12,055				
	San Nicolás.	3,498				
	Batac.	7,026				
	Paoay.	7,447				
	Badoc.	3,356				
TOTAL		55,078	5			

Felipe Bravo Census Demographics (Ilocos Sur, 1818)
Province	Pueblo	Native Families	Spanish Filipino Families	Lacandula Families	Negro Filipino families	Chinese Filipino families
Ilocos Sur	Sinait.	2,625				
	Cabugao.	3,595				
	Lapoc.	1,791				
	Masingal.	2,740				
	Bantay y su visita San Ildefonso.	5,535				
	Santo Domingo.	2,912	36			
	San Vicente Ferrer.	2,113	10			
	Santa Catalina.	4,292				
	Vigan.	6,849	421			14
	Santa Catalina V. y M.	1,750				
	Narvacan.	4,185				
	Santa Maria.	2,985				
	San Esteban.	819				
	Santiago.	1,023				
	Candong.	5,709				
	Santa Lucia y su visita Santa Cruz con la mision de Ronda.	3,690				
	Tagudin y Ous.	2,620				
	Mision llamada Sevilla.					
	Mision de Argaguinan.					
	Bangas y sus misiones.	2,582				
	Villa-Cruz y San Rafael.					
	Namacpacan.	2,564				
	Balaoan.	2,703				
Distrito del Abra
	Tayum en el Abra.	1,307	4			
	Bangued en idem.	1,836	9			
TOTAL		61,397	530			14

Felipe Bravo Census Demographics (Iloilo, 1818)
Province	Pueblo	Native Families	Spanish Filipino Families	Lacandula Families	Negro Filipino families	Chinese Filipino families
Iloilo	Iloilo (cabecera) y Guimaras.	1,594	103			
	Molo.	3,457	23			
	Mandurrio.	5,966				
	Barotac, Asuy y Batag.	1,200				
	Ooton.	5,395				
	Tigbauan.	3,248				
	Guimbal y Tabungan.	4,209				
	Miagao.	4,096				
	San Joaquin.	1,180				
	Igbaras.	3,329				
	Camando.	1,974				
	Alimodian y San Miguel.	4,230				
	Ma-asin.	2,880				
	Cabatuan.	6,470				
	Xaro.	6,871				
	Santa Bárbara.	3,600				
	Janiuay.	4,158				
	Lambuso.	1,040				
	Calinog.	960				
	Pasi y Abaca.	2,637				
	Laglag y Diale.	2,252				
	Pototan.	3,000				
	Dumangas, Anilao, Banate y Barotac.	3,200				
TOTALS		77,862	126			

Felipe Bravo Census Demographics (Laguna, 1818)
Province	Pueblo	Native Families	Spanish Filipino Families	Lacandula Families	Negro Filipino families	Morenos	Chinese Filipino families
Laguna	Pagsanjan, cabecera.	4,785	7				
	Lumban.	1,983					
	Paete.	1,088					
	Longos con su anejo San Antonio del Monte.	944					
	Paquil.	628					
	Panguil.	1,030					
	Siniloan.	1,911					
	Mavitac.	525					
	Santa Maria Caboan.	257					
	Cavioli.	854					
	Majayjay.	4,948					
	Lilio.	2,168					
	Nagcarlan.	2,557					
	Santa Cruz.	2,528					
	Bay.	668					
	Pueblo y hacienda de Calauang.	610	2				
	Pila.	1,117	3				
	Los Baños.	460					5
	Calamba.	959	4				15
	Cabuyao.	1,755			1		14
	Santa Rosa.	1,760					9
	Biñan.	2,598	8		2	2	
	San Pedro Tunasau.	1,112	2			1	
	Pililla.	1,096					
	Tanay.	1,352					
	Binangonan de Bay.	1,234					
	Moron.	1,747					
	Baras.	486	3				
	Pueblo y hacienda de Angono.	513	2		2	3	
TOTAL		40,239	34		5	6	41

Felipe Bravo Census Demographics (Leyte, 1818)
Province	Pueblo	Native Families	Spanish Filipino Families	Lacandula Families	Negro Filipino families	Chinese Filipino families
Leyte	Taclovan (cabecera) y Palo.	2,290	11			
	Tanauan.	2,155	29			
	Dulag y Abuyog.	2,229	14			
	Barayuen, Haro y Alang-alang.	864				
	Barugo y San Miguel.	626				
	Carigara y su visita Leyte.	2,253				
	Palompon, Ogmug y Baybay.	826				
	Hilongos, Bato, Matalom, y Cajanguaan.	1,231	2			
	Indan, Dagami, e Isla de Panamao.	1,978				
Islas de Biliran y Maripipi
	Biliran, Isla de Maripipi, y Maripipi.	538				
Isla de Panahon y Costa Sur
	Isla de Panahon, Ma-asin, Sogod, Cabalian, y Liloan.	1,450				
TOTALES		16,244	56			

Felipe Bravo Census Demographics (Mariana Islands, 1818)
Provinces	Pueblos	Native Citizens	Spanish Citizen
Marianas Islands	(Across the Province in General)	7,555	160

Felipe Bravo Census Demographics (Mindoro, 1818)
Province	Pueblo	Number of Native Families	Number of Spanish Filipino Families	Lacandula Families	Negro Filipino families	Morenos	Chinese Filipino families
Mindoro	Calapan (cabecera) y sus anejos Baco, Sabuan, Abra de Ilog y Dongon.	970	8				
	Naujan y sus anejos Pola, Pinamalayan, Mamalay, Manaol, Bulalacao, Bongabon, Manjao, Manguirin y la Isla de Ilin.	924	6				
Isla de Marinduque
	Santa Cruz de Napo.	1,600	1				
	Boac.	1,908	31		4		
	Gazan.	316	1		1		
Isla de Luban
	Luban.	1,699					
TOTAL		7,455	47		5		

Felipe Bravo Census Demographics (Misamis)
Province	Pueblo	Number of Native Families	Number of Spanish Filipino Families	Lacandula Families	Negro Filipino families	Morenos	Chinese Filipino families
Partido de Misamis
Misamis	Plaza y presidio de Misamis, y su anejo Loculan.	334					
	Presidio de Iligan, con su anejo Initao.	169					
Partido de Dapitan
	Dapitan, y su visita San Lorenzo de Ilaya.	666	2				
	Lobungan, y sus visitas Dipolog, Piao, Dohinog, y Dicayo.	701					
Partido de Cagayan
	Cagayan, y sus visitas Iponau, Mulingan, Agusan, Cagaloan, Lasaan, Balingasay, Salay, Quinoquitan ó Bacay, Mubijut, y la Mision de Pinangudan.	3,177	1				
Isla de Camiguin (Partido de Catarman)
	Catarman, y sus visitas Mambujao, Guinsiliban, y Sagay.	1,693	35				
TOTAL		6,740	38				

Felipe Bravo Census Demographics (Samar, 1818)
Provinces	Pueblos	Native Families	Spanish Filipino Families	Negrito Families	Chinese Filipino Families
Samar	Samar island, in general.	16,671	174		

Felipe Bravo Census Demographics (Zamboanga, 1818)
Provinces	Pueblos	Native Citizens	Spanish Filipino Soldiers	Kapampangan Soldiers	Spanish and Mexican Citizens
Zamboanga	Zamboanga-province and peninsula .	8,640	300	100	A very large but unknown amount of the civilian population, they are mostly employed in the navy and shipping.

The first official census was in 1878, when the population as of midnight on December 31, 1877, was counted. This was followed by the 1887 census, with the 1898 census not completed. The 1887 census yielded a count of 5,984,727 excluding non-Christians.

In the 1860s to 1890s, in the urban areas of the Philippines, especially at Manila, according to burial statistics, as much as 3.3% of the population were pure European Spaniards and the pure Chinese were as high as 9.9%. The Spanish-Filipino and Chinese-Filipino mestizo populations may have fluctuated. Eventually, everybody belonging to these non-native categories diminished because they were assimilated into and chose to self-identify as pure Filipinos. Since during the Philippine Revolution, the term "Filipino" included anybody born in the Philippines coming from any race. That would explain the abrupt drop of otherwise high Chinese, Spanish and mestizo percentages across the country by the time of the first American census in 1903.

=== 1903 census ===
In 1903 the population of the Philippines was recounted by American authorities to fulfill Act 467. The survey yielded 7,635,426 people, including 56,138 who were foreign-born.

=== 1920 census ===
According to the 1920 United States census, there were 10,314,310 people in the Philippines. 99 percent were Filipino; 51,751 were either Chinese or Japanese; 34,563 were of mixed race; 12,577 were Caucasian; and 7,523 were African.

=== 1939 ===
The 1939 census was undertaken in conformity with Section 1 of Commonwealth Act 170. The Philippine population figure was 16,000,303.

=== 1941 ===
In 1941 the estimated population of the Philippines reached 17,000,000. Manila's population was 684,000.

=== 1948 ===
In 1948, just two years after the independence of the Philippines from the United States of America, the country conducted its first post-war national census, recording a population of 19,234,182.

=== Philippine census surveys ===
Census population
Year	Pop.	±% p.a.
1960	27,087,685	—
1970	36,684,486	+3.08%
1975	42,070,660	+2.78%
1980	48,098,460	+2.71%
1990	60,703,206	+2.35%
1995	68,616,536	+2.48%
2000	76,506,928	+2.20%
2007	88,566,732	+2.11%
2010	92,337,852	+1.40%
2015	100,981,437	+1.81%
2020	109,033,245	+1.55%
2024	112,729,484	+0.84%
Source: Philippine Statistics Authority

In 1960, the government of the Philippines conducted a survey on both population, and housing. The population was pegged at 27,087,685. Successive surveys were again conducted in 1970, 1975, 1980, and 1990, which gave the population as 36,684,948, 42,070,660, 48,098,460, and 60,703,206 respectively. In 1995, the POPCEN was launched, undertaken at the month of September. The data provided the bases for the Internal Revenue Allocation to local government units, and for the creation of new legislative areas. The count was made official by then President Fidel Ramos by Proclamation No, 849 on August 14, 1995, with a population of 68,616,536.

View source data.
View source data.
View source data.
View source data.

== Vital statistics ==
=== Registered births and deaths ===
Source: Philippine Statistics Authority

Notable events in Filipino demographics:

- 1918-1919 – Spanish flu pandemic
- 1941-1945 – Second World War
- 2020-2022 – COVID-19 pandemic

	Average population	Live births	Deaths	Natural change	Crude birth rate (per 1000)	Crude death rate (per 1000)	Natural change (per 1000)	Crude migration change (per 1000)	Total fertility rate	Infant mortality rate (per 1000 births)
1903	7,635,000	284,000	329,671	-44,871	37.3	43.2	-5.9			
1904	7,659,000	216,176	146,894	69,282	28.2	19.2	9.0	-5.91		
1905	7,699,000	244,586	166,555	78,031	31.8	21.6	10.2	-4.94		
1906	7,761,000	215,296	143,284	72,012	27.7	18.5	9.2	-1.29		
1907	7,844,000	258,010	138,464	119,546	32.9	17.7	15.2	-4.66		
1908	7,964,000	278,369	190,495	87,874	35.0	23.9	11.1	4.03		
1909	8,095,000	234,726	179,355	55,371	29.0	22.2	6.8	9.35		
1910	8,220,000	290,210	191,576	98,634	35.3	23.3	12.0	3.21		
1911	8,387,000	302,855	188,412	114,443	36.1	22.5	13.6	6.27		
1912	8,576,000	290,995	185,185	105,810	33.9	21.6	12.3	9.70		
1913	8,786,000	316,056	154,086	161,970	36.0	17.5	18.5	5.47		
1914	9,017,000	347,337	163,943	183,394	38.5	18.2	20.3	5.28		
1915	9,269,000	327,206	176,313	150,893	35.3	19.0	16.3	10.90		
1916	9,542,000	340,269	195,970	144,659	35.7	20.5	15.2	13.45		
1917	9,836,000	353,283	212,334	140,949	35.9	21.6	14.3	15.56		
1918	10,314,000	345,751	367,106	-21,355	33.5	35.6	-2.1	48.62		
1919	10,324,000	306,832	326,716	-19,884	29.7	31.6	-1.9	2.89		
1920	10,445,000	351,195	200,690	150,505	33.6	19.2	14.4	-2.83		
1921	10,673,000	364,432	205,654	158,778	34.1	19.3	14.8	6.48		
1922	10,908,000	373,506	203,237	170,269	34.2	18.6	15.6	5.94		
1923	11,152,000	385,418	202,981	182,437	34.6	18.2	16.4	5.52		
1924										
1925										
1926	11,935,000	400,439	229,928	170,511	33.6	19.3	14.3			156.7
1927	12,212,000	414,357	229,328	185,029	33.9	18.8	15.1	7.53		152.5
1928	12,498,000	422,716	218,096	204,620	33.8	17.5	16.3	6.59		150.1
1929	12,792,000	428,996	237,733	191,263	33.5	18.6	14.9	8.02		161.6
1930	13,094,000	429,245	252,988	176,257	32.8	19.3	13.5	9.60		165.0
1931	13,405,000	440,159	240,825	199,334	32.8	18.0	14.8	8.33		155.1
1932	13,724,000	446,940	211,809	235,131	32.6	15.4	17.1	6.11		137.6
1933	14,051,000	459,682	227,594	232,088	32.7	16.2	16.5	6.76		145.8
1934	14,387,000	447,738	239,703	208,035	31.1	16.7	14.4	8.89		160.8
1935	14,731,000	461,410	257,181	204,229	31.3	17.5	13.8	9.49		153.4
1936	15,084,000	485,126	239,107	246,019	32.2	15.9	16.3	7.09		134.0
1937	15,445,000	513,760	254,740	259,020	33.3	16.5	16.8	6.60		137.3
1938	15,814,000	512,389	261,848	250,541	32.4	16.6	15.8	7.50		139.0
1939	16,000,000	522,432	273,141	249,291	32.7	16.9	15.8	-3.96		146.2
1940	16,460,000	535,117	273,480	261,637	32.5	16.6	15.9	12.05		135.8
1941										
1942										
1943										
1944										
1945										
1946	18,434,000	533,283	278,546	254,737	28.9	15.1	13.8			125.5
1947	18,786,000	272,226	238,527	33,699	14.5	12.7	1.8	16.95		234.4
1948	19,234,000	602,415	243,467	358,948	31.3	12.7	18.6	4.63		114.4
1949	19,509,000	609,138	231,151	377,987	31.2	11.8	19.4	-5.28		108.5
1950	19,881,000	642,472	226,505	415,967	32.3	11.4	20.9	-2.21		101.6
1951	20,260,000	637,264	237,937	399,327	31.5	11.7	19.8	-1.01		105.5
1952	20,646,000	650,725	241,020	409,705	31.5	11.7	19.8	-1.15		101.2
1953	21,039,000	468,489	239,988	228,501	22.3	11.4	10.9	7.83		148.8
1954	22,869,000	702,662	217,650	485,012	30.7	9.5	21.2	58.76		94.2
1955	23,568,000	734,761	212,798	521,963	31.2	9.0	22.2	7.51		84.3
1956	24,288,000	542,249	205,581	336,668	22.3	8.5	13.8	15.77		110.9
1957	25,030,000	514,202	199,919	314,283	20.5	8.0	12.5	17.09		112.9
1958	25,795,000	484,592	185,437	299,155	18.6	7.2	11.4	18.05		109.2
1959	26,584,000	616,893	176,448	440,445	23.2	6.6	16.6	13.10		93.4
1960	27,088,000	649,651	196,544	453,107	24.0	7.3	16.7	1.88		84.6
1961	28,214,000	647,846	207,436	440,410	23.0	7.3	15.7	24.31		88.4
1962	29,064,000	775,146	169,880	605,266	26.7	5.9	20.8	8.42		58.6
1963	29,937,000	786,698	214,412	572,286	26.3	7.2	19.1	10.04		72.8
1964	30,841,000	802,648	222,097	580,551	26.0	7.2	18.8	10.49		70.5
1965	31,770,000	795,415	234,935	560,480	25.0	7.4	17.6	11.59		72.9
1966	32,727,000	823,342	236,396	586,946	25.2	7.2	18.0	11.32		72.0
1967	33,713,000	840,302	240,122	600,180	24.9	7.1	17.8	11.45		72.2
1968	34,728,000	898,570	261,893	636,677	25.9	7.5	18.4	10.90		71.0
1969	35,774,000	946,753	241,678	705,075	26.5	6.8	19.7	9.52		67.3
1970	36,684,000	966,762	234,038	732,724	26.4	6.4	20.0	4.83		60.0
1971	37,902,000	963,749	250,139	713,610	25.4	6.6	18.8	13.30		62.0
1972	38,991,000	968,385	285,761	682,624	24.8	7.3	17.5	10.42		67.9
1973	40,123,000	1,049,290	283,475	765,815	26.2	7.1	19.1	9.13		64.7
1974	41,279,000	1,081,073	283,975	797,098	26.2	6.9	19.3	8.70		58.7
1975	42,071,000	1,223,837	271,136	952,701	29.1	6.4	22.7	-3.82		53.3
1976	43,338,000	1,314,860	299,861	1,014,999	30.3	6.9	23.4	5.82		56.9
1977	44,417,000	1,344,836	308,904	1,035,932	30.3	7.0	23.3	0.97		56.8
1978	45,498,000	1,387,588	297,034	1,090,554	30.5	6.5	24.0	1.01		53.1
1979	46,592,000	1,429,814	306,427	1,123,387	30.7	6.6	24.1	0.63		50.2
1980	48,098,000	1,456,860	298,006	1,158,854	30.3	6.2	24.1	7.22		45.1
1981	49,536,000	1,461,204	301,117	1,160,087	29.5	6.1	23.4	5.61		44.1
1982	50,783,000	1,474,491	308,758	1,165,733	29.0	6.1	22.9	1.60		41.8
1983	52,055,000	1,506,356	327,260	1,179,096	28.9	6.3	22.6	1.79		42.7
1984	53,351,000	1,478,205	313,359	1,164,846	27.7	5.9	21.8	2.46		38.5
1985	54,668,000	1,437,154	334,663	1,102,491	26.3	6.1	20.2	3.92		38.0
1986	56,004,000	1,493,995	326,749	1,167,246	26.7	5.8	20.9	3.01		35.0
1987	57,356,000	1,582,469	335,254	1,247,215	27.6	5.8	21.8	1.83		32.1
1988	58,721,000	1,565,372	325,098	1,240,274	26.7	5.5	21.2	2.13		30.1
1989	60,097,000	1,565,254	325,621	1,239,633	26.0	5.4	20.6	2.27		27.5
1990	60,703,000	1,631,069	313,890	1,317,179	26.9	5.4	21.5	-11.72		24.3
1991	63,729,000	1,643,296	298,063	1,345,233	25.8	4.7	21.1	26.39		20.9
1992	65,339,000	1,684,395	319,579	1,364,816	25.8	4.9	20.9	3.75		21.9
1993	66,982,000	1,680,896	318,546	1,362,350	25.1	4.8	20.3	4.19	4.1	20.6
1994	68,624,000	1,645,011	321,440	1,323,571	24.0	4.7	19.3	4.64		18.9
1995	68,617,000	1,645,043	324,737	1,320,306	24.0	4.7	19.3	-19.35		18.6
1996	69,951,000	1,608,468	344,363	1,264,105	23.0	4.9	18.1	1.00		19.0
1997	71,549,000	1,653,236	339,400	1,313,836	23.1	4.7	18.4	3.97		17.0
1998	73,147,000	1,632,859	352,992	1,279,867	22.3	4.8	17.5	4.35	3.7	17.3
1999	74,746,000	1,613,335	347,989	1,265,346	21.6	4.7	16.9	4.46		15.6
2000	76,348,000	1,766,440	366,931	1,399,509	23.1	4.8	18.3	2.65		15.7
2001	77,926,000	1,714,093	381,834	1,332,259	22.0	4.9	17.1	3.15		15.2
2002	79,503,000	1,666,773	396,297	1,270,476	21.0	5.0	16.0	3.86		14.2
2003	81,081,000	1,669,442	396,331	1,273,111	20.6	4.9	15.7	3.76	3.5	13.7
2004	82,663,000	1,710,994	403,191	1,307,803	20.7	4.9	15.8	3.32		13.2
2005	84,241,000	1,688,918	426,054	1,262,864	20.0	5.1	14.9	3.74		12.8
2006	86,973,000	1,663,029	441,036	1,221,993	19.1	5.1	14.0	17.36		13.1
2007	88,706,000	1,749,878	441,956	1,307,922	19.7	5.0	14.7	4.79		12.4
2008	90,457,000	1,784,316	461,581	1,322,735	19.7	5.1	14.6	4.74	3.3	12.5
2009	92,227,000	1,745,585	480,820	1,264,765	18.9	5.2	13.7	5.48		12.4
2010	94,013,000	1,782,981	488,265	1,294,716	19.0	5.2	13.8	5.22		12.6
2011	95,053,000	1,746,864	498,486	1,248,378	18.4	5.3	13.2	-2.19		12.8
2012	96,328,000	1,790,367	514,745	1,275,622	18.6	5.3	13.2	-0.01		12.4
2013	97,571,000	1,761,602	531,280	1,230,322	17.9	5.4	12.5	0.13	3	12.5
2014	99,138,000	1,748,857	536,999	1,211,858	17.6	5.4	12.2	3.58		12.3
2015	100,699,000	1,744,767	560,605	1,184,162	17.3	5.5	11.8	3.75		11.9
2016	102,530,000	1,731,289	582,183	1,149,106	16.8	5.6	11.2	6.64		12.6
2017	104,169,000	1,700,618	579,262	1,121,356	16.2	5.5	10.7	4.97	2.7	11.9
2018	105,755,000	1,668,120	590,709	1,077,411	15.8	5.6	10.2	4.81		12.6
2019	107,288,150	1,674,302	620,724	1,053,578	15.6	5.8	9.8	4.47		13.0
2020	109,202,700	1,528,624	613,936	914,688	14.0	5.6	8.4	9.16		11.0
2021	110,081,700	1,364,739	879,429	485,310	12.4	8.0	4.4	3.57		13.6
2022	110,939,800	1,455,393	679,766	775,627	13.0	6.1	6.9	0.74	1.9	13.8
2023	111,941,200	1,448,522	694,821	753,701	12.8	6.2	6.6	2.22	1.8	14.9
2024	112,729,484	1,358,989	701,884	657,105	12.0	6.2	5.8	1.16	1.73~	
2025(p)		1,298,233							1.63 (e)	
2026									1.51 (e)	

(e)=estimation based on births so far in 2026. numbers can be found below in current vital statistics

==== Current vital statistics ====
As the finalized, instead of provisional, live birth data for 2022 was published on January 5, 2024, while the corresponding finalized death data was published on February 6, 2024, it's better to take the monthly provisional updates with a 12-month delay. For example, regarding the latest provisional update at the end of July 2024, the data within the reference period from January through July 2023 would be reliable, while the data from August on would likely be underregistered and would face large revision during future months.

Period	Live births	Deaths	Natural increase
January- April 2025	400,199	229,702	170,497
January- April 2026	372,953		
Difference	▼ -27,246 (-6.81%)		

Regarding the numbers listed in the table above for comparison, due to the substantial revision of vital statistics within the same reference period published in different versions from month to month (which itself is further due to the delay of registration in the Philippines), to make them really comparable, those data of the same period last year shall be drawn from the corresponding publication one year earlier, rather than the current version. Otherwise recent births and deaths are likely to be drastically underestimated.

Also note that it would be an appropriate assumption that the registration rate is increasing and the delay is decreasing from year to year in the Philippines, which could lead to overestimates in positive changes of births and deaths in the current year.

=== UN estimates ===
World population prospects, 2010
Period	Live births per year	Deaths per year	Natural change per year	CBR^{1}	CDR^{1}	NC^{1}	TFR^{1}	IMR^{1}
1950–1955	981,000	269,000	712,000	48.6	13.3	35.3	7.42	96.8
1955–1960	1,095,000	285,000	810,000	45.7	11.9	33.8	7.27	86.5
1960–1965	1,218,000	299,000	919,000	43.0	10.6	32.5	6.98	77.4
1965–1970	1,334,000	311,000	1,023,000	40.4	9.4	31.0	6.54	67.8
1970–1975	1,461,000	326,000	1,136,000	38.3	8.5	29.8	5.98	59.3
1975–1980	1,643,000	346,000	1,297,000	37.4	7.9	29.5	5.46	51.8
1980–1985	1,801,000	368,000	1,433,000	35.6	7.3	28.3	4.92	45.2
1985–1990	1,968,000	393,000	1,575,000	34.0	6.8	27.2	4.53	39.5
1990–1995	2,084,000	419,000	1,664,000	31.8	6.4	25.4	4.14	34.5
1995–2000	2,216,000	450,000	1,766,000	30.2	6.1	24.1	3.90	30.1
2000–2005	2,360,000	487,000	1,873,000	28.8	5.5	23.3	3.70	26.3
2005–2010	2,318,000	528,000	1,790,000	25.9	5.5	20.4	3.30	23.0
2010–2015				24.1	5.8	18.3	3.05	
2015–2020				20.6	5.8	14.8	2.58	
2020–2025				19.6	6.2	13.4	2.00	
2025–2030				18.6	6.5	12.1	1.70	
^{1}CBR = crude birth rate (per 1000); CDR = crude death rate (per 1000); NC = natural change (per 1000); TFR = total fertility rate (number of children per woman); IMR = infant mortality rate per 1000 births

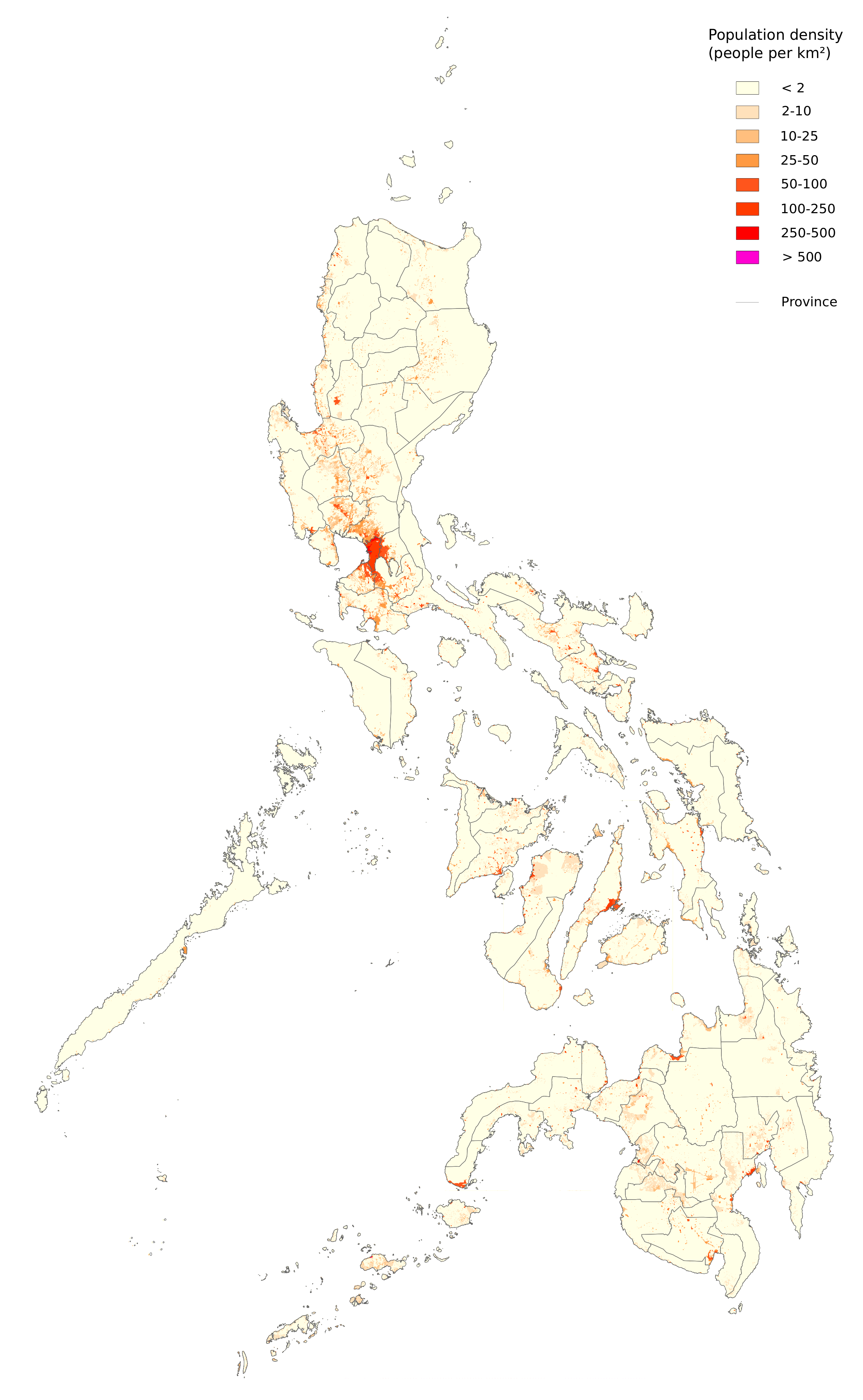
Population density (2010)

=== Demographic and health surveys ===
Total fertility rate (TFR) (wanted fertility rate) and crude birth rate (CBR):

Year	CBR (total)	TFR (total)	CBR (urban)	TFR (urban)	CBR (rural)	TFR (rural)
1993	29.7	4.09 (2.9)	28.5	3.53 (2.6)	30.9	4.82 (3.3)
1998	28.0	3.73 (2.7)	25.8	3.01 (2.3)	30.1	4.67 (3.3)
2003	25.6	3.5 (2.5)	24.7	3.0 (2.2)	26.7	4.3 (3.0)
2008	23.4	3.3 (2.4)	21.6	2.8 (2.1)	24.6	3.8 (2.7)
2013	22.1	3.0 (2.2)	21.5	2.6 (1.9)	22.6	3.5 (2.5)
2017	18.6	2.7 (2.0)	18.4	2.4 (1.8)	18.7	2.9 (2.2)
2022	13.3	1.9 (1.5)	12.7	1.7 (1.3)	14.0	2.2 (1.7)

=== Single mother phenomenon and illegitimate birth rate ===
More than half of the children born every year in the Philippines are illegitimate, and the percentage of illegitimate children is rising by 2% per year. The percentage of unwed woman in live-in relationship is consistently rising e.g. from 5.2% in 1993 to 18.8% in 2022, i.e. over 30 years the percentage of women in live-in increased nearly 360%; and the percentage of women in a married arrangement is consistently decreasing every year e.g. from 54.4% in 1993 to 36.2% in 2022, i.e. over 30 years 33% less woman chose to marry.

Reporting year	% of women in live-in relationship	% increase in women in live-in relationship	% of women in marriages	% change in women in marriages	PSA sources
2022	18.8%	1.3%	36.2%	-6.2%	
2017	17.5%	3.0%	42.4%	-3.4%	
2013	14.5%	3.3%	45.8%	-4.9%	
2008	11.2%	3.2%	50.7%	-4.9%	
2003	8.0%	1.8%	55.6%	-2.2%	
1998	6.2%	1.0%	53.4%	-1.0%	
1993	5.2%	—N/a	54.4%	—N/a	

The following table, based on the annual official data sourced from Philippine Statistics Authority, shows the growing annual trend of illegitimate child births by percentages:

Reporting year	Nationwide % of illegitimate children born every year	Nationwide % increase in illegitimate children compared to previous year	% of illegitimate children born in NCR every year	% of illegitimate children born in ARMM every year	PSA sources
2021	57.1%	0.1%	69.2%	5.2%	
2020	57.0%	2.2%	68.4%	5.4%	
2019	54.8%	0.5%	66.2%	4.8%	
2018	54.3%	1.0%	65.8%	4.3%	
2017	53.3%	4.1%	64.9%	4.3%	
2016	49.2%	−2.9%	59.9%	4.8%	
2015	52.1%	1.8%	63.0%	6.2%	
2014	50.3%	2.1%	62.0%	6.6%	
2013	48.2%	2.5%	60.9%	6.6%	
2012	45.7%	1.1%	58.5%	5.4%	
2011	44.6%	7.1%	56.9%	7.6%	
2008	37.5%	NA	NA	NA	

First time single mothers are mainly due to the teenage pregnancy among girls in the 17 to 19 years old age bracket, thus getting trapped in the cycle of poverty and abuse. Some females become prostitutes in the Philippines after they become unwed single mothers from teenage pregnancy. As of 2016 more than half of Filipina women did not want additional children, but access to contraceptives was limited, and many people were hesitant to use what contraceptives were available due to opposition from the Catholic Church. The reasons for the high illegitimate birthrate and single motherhood include the unpopularity of artificial contraception inadequate sex education, delays in implementing birth control legislation and a machismo attitude among many Filipino males. There are three million household heads without a spouse, two million of whom were female (2015 PSA estimates).

Between 2010 and 2014, 54% of all pregnancies in the Philippines (1.9 million pregnancies) were unintended. Consequently, 9% of women between 15 and 19 years of age have begun childbearing, and every year there are 610 000 unsafe abortions. In 2017, modern contraceptive prevalence rate (CPR) in "the Philippines was 40% among married women of reproductive age and 17% among unmarried sexually active women" and "Forty-six percent of married women used no contraceptive method in 2017 and 14% a traditional method." The "unmet need for family planning' which is the lack of access of contraceptives to women do not want to have more children or wish to delay having children was 17% among married women and 49% among unmarried and among unmarried only 22% women were able to access modern contraceptive methods. "As a consequence of the low contraceptive met need, 68% of unintended pregnancies occur in women not using any method and 24% in those using traditional methods" and the rest had to resort to unsafe traditional methods.

The Catholic Church in Philippines opposes sex before or outside marriage, and the use of modern contraceptive and the passing of laws allowing for divorce. The Catholic religion that was introduced by Spanish colonial era Catholic friars was adapted through a process of enculturation. Hence, there is a gap between the [relatively more orthodox] scriptural Catholic religion and the version practiced by Filipinos in daily life. 84% Filipinos are Catholic, and what Filipinos actually do in practice is different from what they believe in, i.e. Filipinos practice a liberal cultural attitude towards sexual relationships while also contrastingly practicing orthodox Catholic religious belief which opposes the modern scientific contraceptives and laws based on the modern values, resulting in lack of access to family planning methods, stigmatization of medical abortions, a high number of unwanted pregnancies, lack of access to safe modern medical abortions, high and still rising trend of illegitimate newborn birth rate.

The law of the Philippines continues to differentiate and discriminate between filiation (recognition of the biological relationship between father and child) and legitimacy (legally considered a legitimate child), national law still continues to label the "nonmarital births" as "illegitimate", which has been criticized by the social and legal activists for the constitutional stigmatization and denial of equal legal rights.

=== Life expectancy ===
Life expectancy in the Philippines since 1938

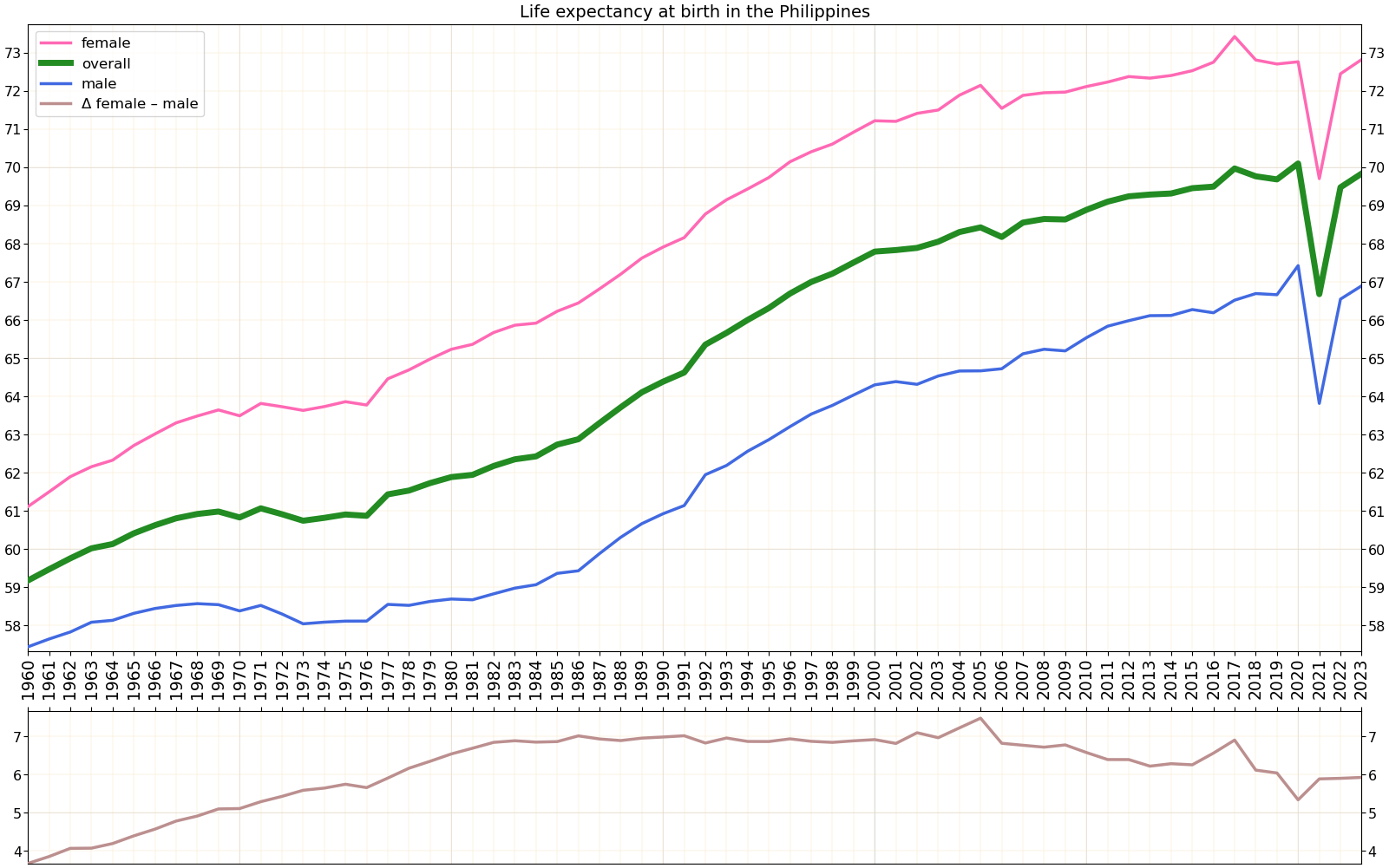
Life expectancy in the Philippines since 1960 by gender

Period	Life expectancy in years	Period	Life expectancy in years
1950–1955	55.4	1985–1990	64.7
1955–1960	57.1	1990–1995	65.7
1960–1965	58.6	1995–2000	66.8
1965–1970	60.1	2000–2005	67.5
1970–1975	61.4	2005–2010	68.0
1975–1980	61.7	2010–2015	68.6
1980–1985	62.9		

Source: UN World Population Prospects

=== Structure of the population ===
Population by sex and age group (Census 01.VIII.2015) (excluding 2134 Filipinos in Philippine embassies, consulates and missions abroad):

Age group	Male	Female	Total	%
Total	51,069,962	49,909,341	100,979,303	100
0–4	5,590,485	5,228,446	10,818,931	10.71
5–9	5,596,837	5,246,083	10,842,920	10.74
10–14	5,405,418	5,088,524	10,493,942	10.39
15–19	5,202,239	4,988,946	10,191,185	10.09
20–24	4,795,772	4,671,722	9,467,494	9.38
25–29	4,252,817	4,107,630	8,360,447	8.28
30–34	3,755,963	3,585,931	7,341,894	7.27
35–39	3,447,349	3,295,338	6,742,687	6.68
40–44	2,995,391	2,853,937	5,849,328	5.79
45–49	2,680,464	2,603,861	5,284,325	5.23
50–54	2,227,579	2,202,968	4,430,547	4.39
55–59	1,785,436	1,821,398	3,606,834	3.57
60–64	1,325,815	1,435,368	2,761,183	2.73
65–69	878 327	1,037,798	1,916,125	1.90
70–74	523 237	696 843	1,220,080	1.21
75–79	338 520	520 578	859 098	0.85
80–84	169 388	305 752	475 140	0.47
85–89	69 930	148 296	218 226	0.22
90–94	21 868	53 087	74 955	0.07
95–99	5 956	14 010	19 966	0.02
100+	1 171	2 825	3 996	<0.01
Age group	Male	Female	Total	Percent
0–14	16,592,740	15,563,053	32,155,793	31.84
15–64	32,468,825	31,567,099	64,035,924	63.41
65+	2,008,397	2,779,189	4,787,586	4.74

Population estimates by sex and age group (01.VII.2021) (estimates or projections based on the 2015 population census):

Age group	Male	Female	Total	%
Total	55,641,183	54,557,471	110,198,654	100
0–4	5,713,939	5,376,619	11,090,558	10.06
5–9	5,721,245	5,393,760	11,115,005	10.09
10–14	5,571,493	5,266,058	10,837,551	9.83
15–19	5,282,220	5,065,572	10,347,792	9.39
20–24	5,025,243	4,778,690	9,803,933	8.90
25–29	4,731,675	4,491,835	9,223,510	8.37
30–34	4,332,532	4,161,373	8,493,905	7.71
35–39	3,809,605	3,689,326	7,498,931	6.80
40–44	3,315,063	3,236,820	6,551,883	5.95
45–49	2,991,320	2,930,462	5,921,782	5.37
50–54	2,552,972	2,536,854	5,089,826	4.62
55–59	2,159,465	2,201,321	4,360,786	3.96
60–64	1,679,598	1,793,510	3,473,108	3.15
65-69	1,202,310	1,377,181	2,579,491	2.34
70-74	757 578	957 989	1,715,567	1.56
75-79	450 941	660 111	1,111,052	1.01
80+	343 984	639 990	983 974	0.89
Age group	Male	Female	Total	Percent
0–14	17,006,677	16,036,437	33,043,114	29.99
15–64	35,879,693	34,885,763	70,765,456	64.22
65+	2,754,813	3,635,271	6,390,084	5.80

=== By region ===
Total fertility rate (TFR) and other related statistics by region, as of 2013:

Region	Total fertility rate	Percentage of women age 15–49 currently pregnant	Mean number of children ever born to women age 40–49
National Capital Region	2.3	3.0	3.0
Cordillera Administrative Region	2.9	4.8	4.0
Ilocos Region	2.8	4.5	3.2
Cagayan Valley	3.2	6.1	3.7
Central Luzon	2.8	4.1	3.3
Calabarzon	2.7	3.1	3.4
Mimaropa	3.7	5.8	4.5
Bicol	4.1	4.0	4.6
Western Visayas	3.8	4.2	4.2
Central Visayas	3.2	3.9	3.6
Eastern Visayas	3.5	5.9	4.0
Zamboanga Peninsula	3.5	6.4	4.5
Northern Mindanao	3.5	5.7	4.3
Davao	2.9	5.0	3.9
Soccsksargen	3.2	3.8	4.2
Caraga	3.6	6.6	4.4
ARMM	4.2	4.7	5.5

=== TFR before 1900 ===
Years	1800	1801	1802	1803	1804	1805	1806	1807	1808	1809
Total Fertility Rate in Philippines	6.45	6.41	6.38	6.34	6.30	6.26	6.23	6.19	6.12	6.04

Years	1810	1811	1812	1813	1814	1815	1816	1817	1818	1819
Total Fertility Rate in Philippines	5.97	5.89	5.82	6.01	6.20	6.39	6.58	6.77	6.79	6.82

Years	1820	1821	1822	1823	1824	1825	1826	1827	1828	1829
Total Fertility Rate in Philippines	6.85	6.87	6.90	6.96	7.02	7.08	7.14	7.20	7.10	7.01

Years	1830	1831	1832	1833	1834	1835	1836	1837	1838	1839
Total Fertility Rate in Philippines	6.91	6.82	6.73	6.60	6.46	6.33	6.20	6.07	6.01	5.96

Years	1840	1841	1842	1843	1844	1845	1846	1847	1848	1849
Total Fertility Rate in Philippines	5.90	5.85	5.79	5.87	5.94	6.02	6.10	6.18	6.23	6.28

Years	1850	1851	1852	1853	1854	1855	1856	1857	1858	1859
Total Fertility Rate in Philippines	6.34	6.39	6.45	6.44	6.43	6.42	6.41	6.41	6.42	6.44

Years	1860	1861	1862	1863	1864	1865	1866	1867	1868	1869
Total Fertility Rate in Philippines	6.46	6.48	6.50	6.47	6.45	6.42	6.39	6.36	6.39	6.42

Years	1870	1871	1872	1873	1874	1875	1876	1877	1878	1879
Total Fertility Rate in Philippines	6.45	6.48	6.51	6.43	6.35	6.27	6.19	6.07	5.94	5.82

Years	1880	1881	1882	1883	1884	1885	1886	1887	1888	1889
Total Fertility Rate in Philippines	5.97	6.13	6.29	6.45	6.61	6.77	6.90	7.20	6.73	6.07

Years	1890	1891	1892	1893	1894	1895	1896	1897	1898	1899
Total Fertility Rate in Philippines	5.79	6.18	6.45	6.41	6.50	6.36	6.51	6.57	6.38	6.37

== Ethnic groups and modern immigrants in the Philippines ==
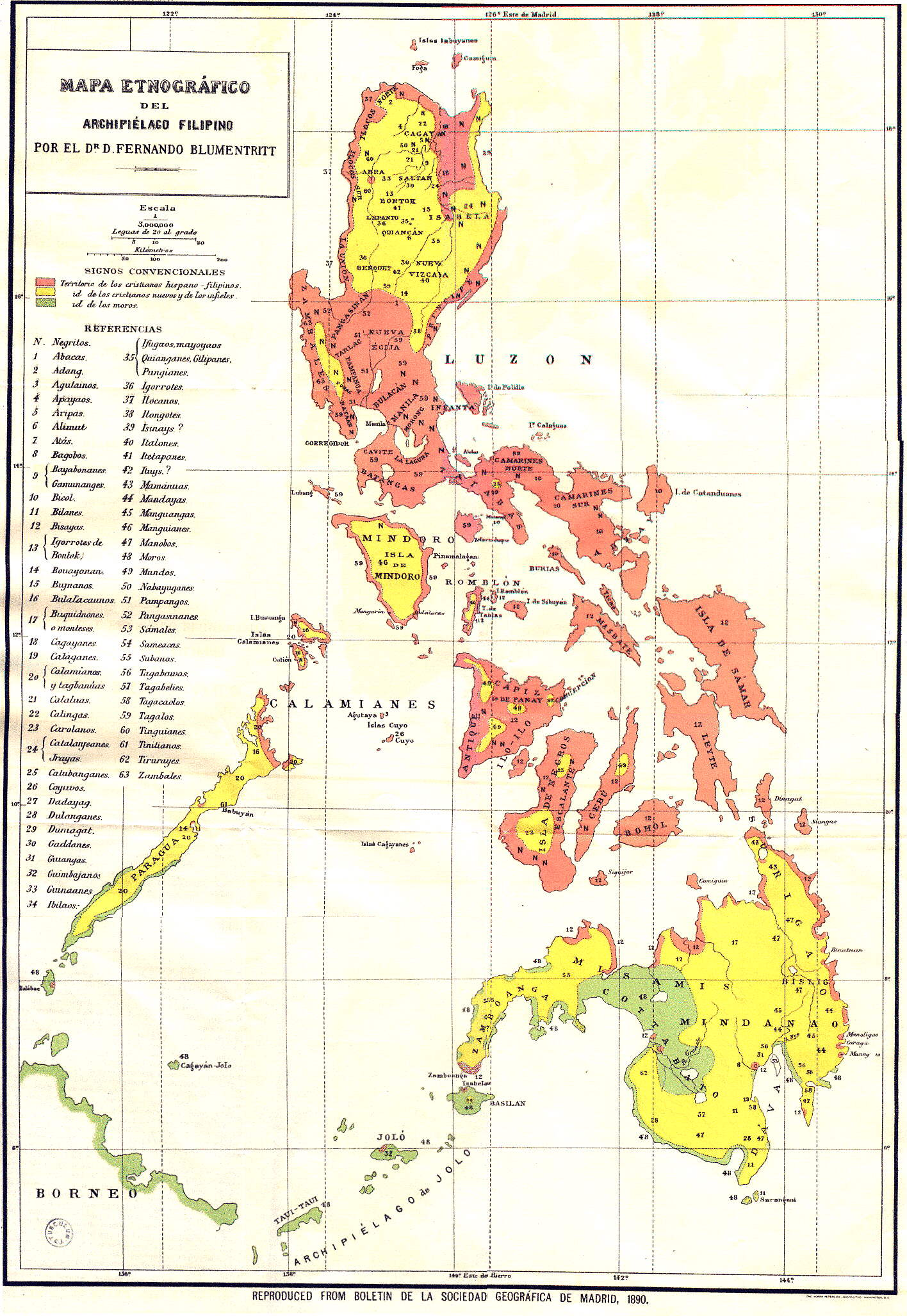
Ethnographic map of the Philippines, 1890

The majority of the people in the Philippines are related to Austronesian peoples. According to the CIA Factbook, the largest ethnic groups as of 2020 are the Tagalogs (26%), the Bisaya people (14.3%), the Ilocano people (8%), the Bicolano people (6.5%), the Waray people (3.8%), the Kapampangan people (3.0%), the Pangasinan people (1.9%), and the Maguindanao people (1.9%), among other local ethnicities (18.5%). The indigenous peoples of the Philippines form a minority of the population. Other large ethnic groups include Filipinos of Japanese, Indian, Chinese, Spanish, and American descent. There are more than 175 ethnolinguistic groups in the Philippines, each with their own, identity, literature, tradition, music, dances, foods, beliefs, and history, but which form part of the tapestry of Filipino culture. The latest censuses did not take account of ethnicity, and the only census that included questions on ethnicity is of the 2000 census.

Nevertheless, a 2019 Anthropology Study by Matthew Go, published in the Journal of Human Biology, using physical anthropology, estimated that, 72.7% of Filipinos are Asian, 12.7% of Filipinos can be classified as Hispanic (Latin-American Mestizos or Austronesian-Spanish Mestizos), 7.3% as Indigenous American, African at 4.5% and European at 2.7%. However, this is only according to an interpretation of the data wherein the reference groups, which were cross checked to the Filipino samples; for the Hispanic category, were Mexican-Americans, and the reference groups for the: European, African, and Indigenous American, categories, were: White Americans, Black Americans, and Native Americans from the USA, while the Asian reference groups were sourced from Chinese, Japanese, and Vietnamese origins.

In contrast, a different anthropology study using Morphoscopic ancestry estimates in Filipino crania using multivariate probit regression models by J. T. Hefner, while analyzing Historic and Modern samples of Philippine skeletons, paint a different picture, in that, when the reference group for "Asian" was Thailand (Southeast Asians) rather than Chinese, Japanese, and Vietnamese; and the reference group for "Hispanic" was Colombians (South Americans) rather than Mexicans, the historical and modern sample results for Filipinos, yielded the following ratios: Asian at 48.6%, African at 32.9%, and only a small portion classifying as either European at 12.9%, and finally for Hispanic at 5.7%.

The total number of immigrants and expats in Philippines as of the 2010 census is 177,365. By country:

Country	2015	2020
United States of America:	29,972	6,306
China	28,705	22,494
Japan	11,584	4,397
India	9,007	18,959
Korea, South	5,822	4,372
Korea, North	4,846	406
Canada	4,700	861
United Kingdom of Great Britain and Northern Ireland	3,474	823
Australia	3,360	1,460
Germany	3,184	1,533
Indonesia	2,781	955
Taiwan	1,538	1,021
Italy	1,460	298
Afghanistan	1,019	38
France	1,014	547
Spain	1,009	136
Switzerland	872	518
Turkey	739	105
Singapore	691	400
South Africa	681	230
Malaysia	673	440
Saudi Arabia	621	324
Norway	550	265
Israel	514	67
Sweden	513	269
Iran	498	174
Tunisia	479	
Belgium	445	241
Congo	444	
Austria	424	139
Pakistan	421	451
Netherlands	407	509
Algeria	389	
Ecuador	387	17
Denmark	374	187
United Arab Emirates	368	174
Ireland	362	110
Myanmar	355	125
Vietnam	351	944
Oman	342	11
New Zealand	325	139
Thailand	286	120
Hungary	206	16
Nigeria	162	851
Jordan	150	49
Sri Lanka	146	176
Kuwait	144	94
Egypt	135	96
Brazil	134	73
Bangladesh	133	598
Greece	129	31
Portugal	127	38
Argentina	125	23
Mexico	123	73
Russia	120	133
East Timor	119	
Armenia	115	
Lebanon	110	83
Cape Verde	109	
Colombia	106	85
Suriname	106	
Qatar	102	26
Others	1,617	

== Languages ==
According to the Komisyon sa Wikang Filipino, there are 135 ethnic languages in the Philippine archipelago, each spoken by the respective ethno-linguistic group, except for the national Filipino language which is spoken by all 134 ethno-linguistic groups in the country. Most of the languages have several varieties (dialects), totaling over 300 across the archipelago. In the 1930s, the government promoted the use of the Tagalog language as the national language, and called the new Tagalog-based language as the national Filipino language, becoming the 135th ethnic language of the country. Visayan languages (Cebuano, Waray, Hiligaynon, etc.) are widely spoken throughout the Visayas and in most parts of Mindanao. Ilokano is the lingua franca of Northern Luzon excluding Pangasinan. Zamboangueño Chavacano is the official language of Zamboanga City and lingua franca of Basilan.

Filipino and English are the official languages of the country for purposes of communication and instruction. Consequently, English is widely spoken and understood, although fluency has decreased as the prevalence of Tagalog in primary and secondary educational institutions has increased.

== Religion ==
The Philippine Statistics Authority in October 2015 reported that 80.58% of the total Filipino population were Roman Catholics, 10.8% were Protestant and 5.57% were Islamic. Although the 2012 International Religious Freedom (IRF) reports that an estimate by the National Commission on Muslim Filipinos (NCMF) in 2011 stated that there were then 10.3 million Muslims, or about 10 percent of the total population however this is yet to be proven officially. In 2000, according to the "World Values Survey", 1.8% were Protestant Christians and 10.9% were then irreligious. Other Christian denominations include the Iglesia ni Cristo (one of a number of separate Churches of Christ generally not affiliated with one another), Aglipayan Church, Members Church of God International, and the Church of Jesus Christ of Latter-day Saints (LDS Church). Minority religions include Buddhism, Hinduism, and Judaism. Roman Catholics and Protestants were converted during the four centuries of Western influence by Spain, and the United States. Under Spanish rule, much of the population was converted to Christianity.

Orthodox Christianity also has a presence in the Philippines. The Orthodoxy was brought over by Russian and Greek immigrants to the Philippines. Protestant Christianity arrived in the Philippines during the 20th century, introduced by American missionaries.

Other religions include Judaism, Mahayana Buddhism, often mixed with Taoist beliefs, Hinduism, Sikhism, and Indigenous Philippine folk religions.

Population by religious affiliation (2015)
Affiliation	Number	
Roman Catholic, including Catholic Charismatic	80.58	74,211,896
Islam	5.57	5,127,084
Evangelicals (PCEC)	2.68	2,469,957
Iglesia ni Cristo	2.45	2,251,941
Non-Roman Catholic and Protestant (NCCP)	1.16	1,071,686
Aglipayan	1.00	916,639
Seventh-day Adventist	0.74	681,216
Bible Baptist Church	0.52	480,409
United Church of Christ in the Philippines	0.49	449,028
Jehovah's Witnesses	0.45	410,957
Other Protestants	0.31	287,734
Church of Christ	0.28	258,176
Jesus Is Lord Church Worldwide	0.23	207,246
Tribal Religions	0.19	177,147
United Pentecostal Church (Philippines) Inc.	0.18	169,956
Other Baptists	0.17	154,686
Philippine Independent Catholic Church	0.15	138,364
Unión Espiritista Cristiana de Filipinas, Inc.	0.15	137,885
Church of Jesus Christ of the Latter Day Saints	0.15	133,814
Association of Fundamental Baptist Churches in the Philippines	0.12	106,509
Evangelical Christian Outreach Foundation	0.10	96,102
None	0.08	73,248
Convention of the Philippine Baptist Church	0.07	65,008
Crusaders of the Divine Church of Christ Inc.	0.06	53,146
Buddhist	0.05	46,558
Lutheran Church of the Philippines	0.05	46,558
Iglesia sa Dios Espiritu Santo Inc.	0.05	45,000
Philippine Benevolent Missionaries Association	0.05	42,796
Faith Tabernacle Church (Living Rock Ministries)	0.04	36,230
Others	0.33	299,399
Total		92,097,978
Source: Philippine Statistics Authority

== Education ==
Education in the Philippines has been influenced by foreign models, particularly the United States, and Spain. Philippine students enter public school at about age four, starting from nursery school up to kindergarten. At about seven years of age, students enter elementary school (6 to 7 years). This is followed by junior high school (4 years) and senior high school (2 years). Students then take the college entrance examinations (CEE), after which they enter university (3 to 5 years). Other types of schools include private school, preparatory school, international school, laboratory high school, and science high school. School year in the Philippines starts from June, and ends in March with a two-month summer break from April to May, one week of semestral break in October, and a week or two during Christmas and New Year holidays.

Starting in SY 2011–2012 there has been a phased implementation of a new program. The K to 12 Program covers kindergarten and 12 years of basic education (six years of primary education, four years of junior high school, and two years of senior high school [SHS]).

== Publications ==
- Cristian Capelli; et al. (2001). "A Predominantly Indigenous Paternal Heritage for the Austronesian-Speaking Peoples of Insular Southeast Asia and Oceania" (PDF). American Journal of Human Genetics. 68 (2): 432–443. doi:10.1086/318205. PMC 1235276. PMID 11170891. Archived from the original (PDF) on February 14, 2010.
- Frederic H. Sawyer (1900). The Inhabitants of the Philippines. Library of Alexandria. ISBN 978-1-4655-1185-0.
- 1903 Census of the Philippine Islands, Volumes 1, 2, 3, 4
