= Deep Tyagi =

Pioneer of family planning in India

The red triangle symbol invented by Deep Tyagi indicates family planning products and services in many countries

Dharmendra Kumar Tyagi (1928–1969), better known as Deep Tyagi or DK Tyagi, was an assistant commissioner for the Indian family planning program until 1969. An early pioneer of family planning in India and elsewhere, he was a champion of the program under the premierships of Jawaharlal Nehru, Lal Bahadur Shastri, and the initial period of Indira Gandhi. He invented the now-pervasive (in India and some other countries) "red triangle" symbol as a branding effort to familiarize and popularize the idea of family planning.

Many of the mass communication techniques he developed are now used throughout the developing world to combat disease (such as HIV/AIDS) and poverty. Part of the mission statement of the present-day foundation, DKT International, which was named in his honour, reads: "He was 41 years old at the time of his death, but had already made a major contribution to his country's family planning effort. It was he who was largely responsible for the design and dissemination of a massive communication program that brought awareness and knowledge of family planning to hundreds of millions of Indians. He began his work at a time (1966) when modern contraceptive methods were virtually unknown in rural India. His success in saturating the country with simple, attractive messages and designs (including the red triangle, which is now in use in several other countries) overcame age-old communication barriers and greatly increased public awareness of birth control."

== Life ==
Tyagi was born in Ratangarh village of Uttar Pradesh in 1928. He died of cancer at the age of 41, in 1969. He had no children.

== See also ==
- Family planning in India
