= Don Jose S. Monfort Medical Center =

Government hospital in Iloilo, Philippines

Geography
- Location: Barotac Nuevo, Iloilo, Western Visayas, Philippines
- Coordinates: 10°53′50″N 122°41′46″E

The Don Jose S. Monfort Medical Center (DJSMMC) is a government hospital in the Philippines It is located in Barotac Nuevo, Iloilo.

== History ==
The Don Jose S. Monfort Medical Center, formerly known as Barotac Nuevo Municipal Hospital, was established as a 10-bed hospital in Barotac Nuevo, Iloilo, following the approval of Batasang Pambansa Bilang 303 on November 14, 1982. The hospital was constructed by the Ministry of Public Works and completed in 1985. It began operations in December 1983 with a 22-personnel complement, initially headed by Dr. Mauricio Madrona, followed by Dr. Rafael Callado in 1987.

On March 20, 1992, Republic Act (RA) 7264 increased the hospital's capacity to 50 beds. However, due to fiscal constraints after the devolution of health services to local governments in 1993, the hospital continued to operate with only 10 beds.

On November 2, 1997, Republic Act 8372 renamed the hospital as Don Jose S. Monfort Medical Center Extension Hospital (DJSMMCEH) and upgraded its status to a tertiary hospital under the supervision of Western Visayas Medical Center (WVMC). A Memorandum of Agreement was signed between the Department of Health (DOH) and the Iloilo Provincial Government for the hospital's re-nationalization.

In 2001, Dr. Andres M. Dolar was designated Officer-in-Charge of the hospital. In 2005, the Department of Health transferred management of DJSMMCEH back to WVMC, with Dr. Jose Mari C. Fermin, Chief of WVMC, assuming direct supervision. Dr. Joseph Dean L. Nicolo was designated Officer-in-Charge in 2006 and later appointed Chief of Hospital II in 2014.

DJSMMCEH's bed capacity increased to 25 beds as a Level 1 General Hospital in 2006, and to 50 beds in 2017. On June 3, 2019, the hospital's License to Operate was upgraded to 100 beds, Level 1 General Hospital.

On April 29, 2022, Republic Act 11725 was signed into law, converting DJSMMCEH into a full-fledged tertiary hospital. This law allows for the expansion of healthcare services and enhances the hospital's ability to receive referrals for higher levels of care, easing the burden on WVMC.

== See also ==
- Health care in the Philippines
- Birth and death statistics in Philippines by PSA's NSO
- Single mother phenomenon and rights of child in Philippines
- List of Hospitals in Region-6 (Iloilo region) and rest of Philippines
