= List of states and union territories of India by fertility rate =

This is a list of the states and union territories of India ranked in order of number of children born for each woman.

Recent surveys show that in majority of Indian states, Total fertility rate has fallen well below the replacement level of 2.1 and the country is fast approaching the replacement level itself. The total fertility rate of India in 2017 stood at 2.2. Due to the large population, poverty and strain on resources, the Indian government initiated population control efforts to decrease birth rate with the current target being at 2.1 children per woman. According to data from National Family Health Survey, India's total fertility rate dropped below the replacement level of around 2.1, and currently stands at 1.9.

== Indian states by fertility rate ==
Fertility Rate as per National Family Health Survey (NFHS-6), 2023-24.

Rank	State	TFR (Total)	Urban	Rural
1	Sikkim	1.0	0.7	1.1
2	Ladakh	1.6	1.7	1.6
3	Goa	1.6	1.4	1.8
4	Chandigarh	1.8	1.8	N/A
5	Lakshadweep	2.2	1.9	2.7
6	Jammu & Kashmir	1.8	1.5	1.9
7	Delhi	1.6	1.6	1.7
8	West Bengal	1.6	1.3	1.7
9	Punjab	1.6	1.6	1.7
10	Maharashtra	1.8	1.6	1.9
11	Himachal Pradesh	1.8	1.4	1.9
12	Andhra Pradesh	1.8	1.6	2.0
13	Karnataka	1.8	1.7	1.8
14	Nagaland	2.0	1.4	2.4
15	Dadra and Nagar Haveli and Daman and Diu	1.7	1.5	1.9
16	Tripura	1.7	1.1	1.8
17	Kerala	1.8	1.8	1.9
18	Odisha	1.7	1.5	1.8
19	Tamil Nadu	1.7	1.6	1.8
20	Telangana	1.9	1.7	1.9
21	Manipur	NA	NA	NA
22	Mizoram	1.6	1.5	1.7
23	Gujarat	1.9	1.7	2.0
24	Assam	1.6	1.2	1.7
25	Rajasthan	2.1	1.7	2.2
26	Haryana	2.0	1.8	2.1
27	Arunachal Pradesh	1.5	1.4	1.5
28	Chhattisgarh	1.9	1.5	2.0
29	Andaman and Nicobar Islands	0.9	0.8	0.9
30	Madhya Pradesh	2.1	1.7	2.3
31	Jharkhand	2.2	1.5	2.4
32	Uttar Pradesh	2.2	1.8	2.3
33	Meghalaya	2.2	1.3	2.4
34	Bihar	2.7	2.1	2.8
35	Uttarakhand	1.9	1.5	2.0
36	Puducherry	1.6	1.5	1.8

== Indian States and UTs fertility rate by Education level ==
Fertility Rate by Education level across States and UTs (2019)
State	No Schooling	<5 Years Complete	5-9 Years Complete	10-11 Years Complete	12 or More Years Complete
Manipur	3.23	2.47	2.46	2.12	1.89
Mizoram	2.51	2.14	2.11	1.73	1.48
Arunachal Pradesh	2.54	2.13	2.13	1.72	1.49
Tripura	2.62	2.03	1.78	2.03	1.51
Assam	2.31	2.41	2.03	1.74	1.51
Sikkim	1.18	2.04	1.36	1.31	0.92
Meghalaya	4.48	5.07	3.02	1.88	1.67
Himachal Pradesh	3.32	2.57	2.13	2.01	1.63
Uttarakhand	2.61	2.79	2.04	1.91	1.72
Haryana	3.11	2.83	2.14	1.83	1.71
Punjab	2.47	2.52	2.03	1.92	1.54
Rajasthan	2.79	2.48	2.13	2.04	1.68
Delhi (UT)	2.76	3.12	2.05	1.53	1.52
Uttar Pradesh	3.01	2.73	2.62	2.19	2.04
Chhattisgarh	2.29	2.21	2.04	2.03	1.58
Madhya Pradesh	2.71	2.15	2.18	1.72	1.65
Gujarat	2.81	2.24	2.03	1.89	1.54
Maharashtra	2.34	2.17	2.11	1.84	1.63
Goa	1.46	0.88	2.02	1.39	1.27
Kerala	0.43	1.83	1.78	1.91	1.87
Tamil Nadu	1.82	1.64	1.93	1.91	2.02
Karnataka	2.14	2.23	1.91	1.82	1.77
Telangana	2.12	1.93	1.91	1.91	2.01
Andhra Pradesh	1.82	1.92	2.02	1.94	1.91
Jharkhand	2.83	2.81	2.28	2.21	1.87
Bihar	3.83	3.47	3.01	2.41	2.17
West Bengal	2.19	1.91	1.91	1.71	1.42
Odisha	2.42	2.14	1.92	1.87	1.67

== Fertility Rate by Religious Adherence across States and UTs ==
The following table highlights the fertility rates across various religions and states/union territories in India, based on available data from 2019.

Fertility Rate by Religion across States and UTs (2019)
State/UT	Hindu Women	Christian Women	Muslim Women	Sikh Women	Jain Women	Buddhist/Neo-Buddhist Women	Other Religions Women
Andhra Pradesh	1.69	1.89	2.17	-	-	-	-
Arunachal Pradesh	1.71	2.01	1.72	-	-	1.58	-
Assam	1.62	1.51	2.42	-	-	-	-
Bihar	2.89	-	3.58	-	-	-	-
Chhattisgarh	1.81	2.14	1.77	-	-	-	2.18
Delhi	1.63	-	2.04	0.91	-	-	-
Goa	1.52	1.02	1.21	-	-	-	-
Gujarat	1.85	1.91	2.13	-	-	-	-
Haryana	1.84	-	3.87	-	-	-	-
Himachal Pradesh	1.58	-	1.63	1.73	-	1.39	-
Jharkhand	2.19	1.91	2.69	-	-	-	-
Karnataka	1.61	1.53	2.08	-	-	-	-
Kerala	1.77	1.02	2.29	-	-	-	-
Madhya Pradesh	2.04	-	2.43	-	-	-	-
Maharashtra	1.72	-	2.07	-	-	1.41	-
Manipur	1.77	2.94	2.28	-	-	-	-
Meghalaya	0.82	3.18	1.38	-	-	-	3.91
Odisha	1.78	2.31	1.91	-	-	-	-
Punjab	1.63	1.79	2.04	1.57	-	-	-
Rajasthan	2.02	-	2.48	-	-	-	-
Tamil Nadu	1.61	1.53	2.11	-	-	-	-
Telangana	1.75	1.79	2.03	-	-	-	-
Tripura	1.58	2.09	2.08	-	-	-	-
Uttar Pradesh	2.31	-	2.72	1.18	-	-	-
Uttarakhand	1.68	-	2.49	-	-	-	-
West Bengal	1.52	1.02	2.04	-	-	-	-

== Total Fertility Rate in India by Region ==
Region	1951-1961	1961-1971	1971-1981	1981-1991	NFHS-1 (1992-93)	NFHS-2 (1998-99)	NFHS-3 (2005-06)	NFHS-4 (2015-16)	NFHS-5 (2019-21)
North India (average)	6.03 ▼	5.80 ▼	5.20 ▼	3.73 ▼	3.68 ▼	3.28 ▼	2.90 ▼	2.23 ▼	2.00 ▼
South India (average)	5.74 ▼	5.08 ▼	4.00 ▼	3.03 ▼	2.69 ▼	2.29 ▼	1.98 ▼	1.79 ▼	1.83 ▲
Western India (average)	5.85 ▼	5.53 ▼	4.58 ▼	3.30 ▼	3.18 ▼	2.67 ▼	2.27 ▼	1.96 ▼	1.81 ▼
East India (average)	6.07 ▼	5.85 ▼	3.60 ▼	3.68 ▲	3.13 ▼	2.92 ▼	2.42 ▼	2.05 ▼	
Central India (average)	6.20 ▼	6.00 ▼	5.70 ▼	4.07 ▼	4.18 ▲	3.52 ▼	3.05 ▼	2.72 ▼	2.10 ▼
Northeast India (average)	5.82 ▼	5.63 ▼	5.12 ▼	4.00 ▼	3.46 ▼	3.09 ▼	2.96 ▼	2.34 ▼	2.15 ▼

== Urban and Rural Fertility Rates in India by State/UT (NFHS-5, 2019-21) ==
Fertility Rates in Urban and Rural Areas of Indian States and Union Territories According to NFHS-5.

Source: National Family Health Survey (NFHS-5), 2019-21. Ministry of Health and Family Welfare, Government of India.

State/UT	Total	Urban	Rural
Andaman & Nicobar Islands	1.48	1.36	1.6
Andhra Pradesh	1.70	1.62	1.74
Arunachal Pradesh	2.11	1.58	2.24
Assam	1.90	1.57	2.01
Bihar	3.00	2.25	3.19
Chandigarh	1.39	1.39	N/A
Chhattisgarh	1.96	1.63	2.08
Dadra & Nagar Haveli and Daman & Diu	1.93	1.80	2.12
Delhi	1.57	1.57	N/A
Goa	1.32	1.28	1.41
Gujarat	1.90	1.63	2.15
Haryana	2.00	1.67	2.18
Himachal Pradesh	1.70	1.38	1.75
Jammu & Kashmir	1.40	1.20	1.50
Jharkhand	2.30	1.84	2.42
Karnataka	1.70	1.54	1.81
Kerala	1.80	1.64	1.92
Ladakh	1.30	1.30	1.33
Lakshadweep	1.40	1.40	N/A
Madhya Pradesh	2.00	1.62	2.23
Maharashtra	1.68	1.44	1.89
Manipur	2.17	1.85	2.29
Meghalaya	2.91	2.32	3.00
Mizoram	2.07	1.87	2.31
Nagaland	1.71	1.50	1.77
Odisha	1.80	1.54	1.88
Puducherry	1.70	1.47	1.87
Punjab	1.63	1.42	1.74
Rajasthan	2.00	1.73	2.10
Sikkim	1.05	0.98	1.12
Tamil Nadu	1.80	1.65	1.91
Telangana	1.82	1.63	1.95
Tripura	1.77	1.70	1.80
Uttar Pradesh	2.35	2.01	2.47
Uttarakhand	1.90	1.60	2.04
West Bengal	1.60	1.40	1.80

== See also ==
- Demographics of India

== Sources ==
- Census of India
- National Family Health Survey (NFHS-5)
- National Family Health Survey (NFHS-4)
- National Family Health Survey (NFHS-3)
- National Family Health Survey (NFHS-2)
- National Family Health Survey (NFHS-1)

== Visualisation ==
Google Chart TFR vs Area vs Population
