= Red triangle (family planning) =

Symbol for contraceptive services, particularly in developing countries

The red triangle indicates family planning products and services

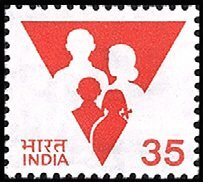
Family planning stamp of India with the red triangle, 1987

An inverted red triangle is the symbol for family planning health and contraception services, much as the red cross is a symbol for medical services. It was first introduced by Frank Wilder in December 1968 for use throughout the Global South. It first appeared in India, followed by other countries such as Ghana, Gambia, Zimbabwe, Egypt and Thailand.

Throughout parts of the Global South, it is used outside shops and clinics that offer family planning products, and as in commercial and government messages that promote reproductive health services and population control. It is frequently placed on contraceptive products, such as condoms, diaphragms, spermicidal gel, and IUDs (for instance, on the government-subsidized Nirodh condoms in India and Sultan condoms in Gambia).

== Origins and variations ==
The red triangle was adopted by Deep Tyagi, an Indian family planning official and activist in the 1960s. Several variations on the basic symbol have since been developed, such as the "Life Choices" and "Family Planning: better life" logos used to promote birth control and reproductive health in Ghana, and the "Naissances Desirables" logo used in Zaire/Congo. The "Men Too" (shortened from "Family Planning is for Everybody ... Men Too") campaign in Australia used a hollow red triangle. The "Stop and think Minyawi : This is a very happy family, a light family" initiative in Egypt used calligraphic Arabic script to create the triangle.

== See also ==
- Birth control
- Demographics of India
- The Emergency (India)
- One-child policy
- Reproductive health

=== Symbols ===
- Brown triangle
- Pink triangle
- Red triangle
