= Nirodh =

Indian condom brand

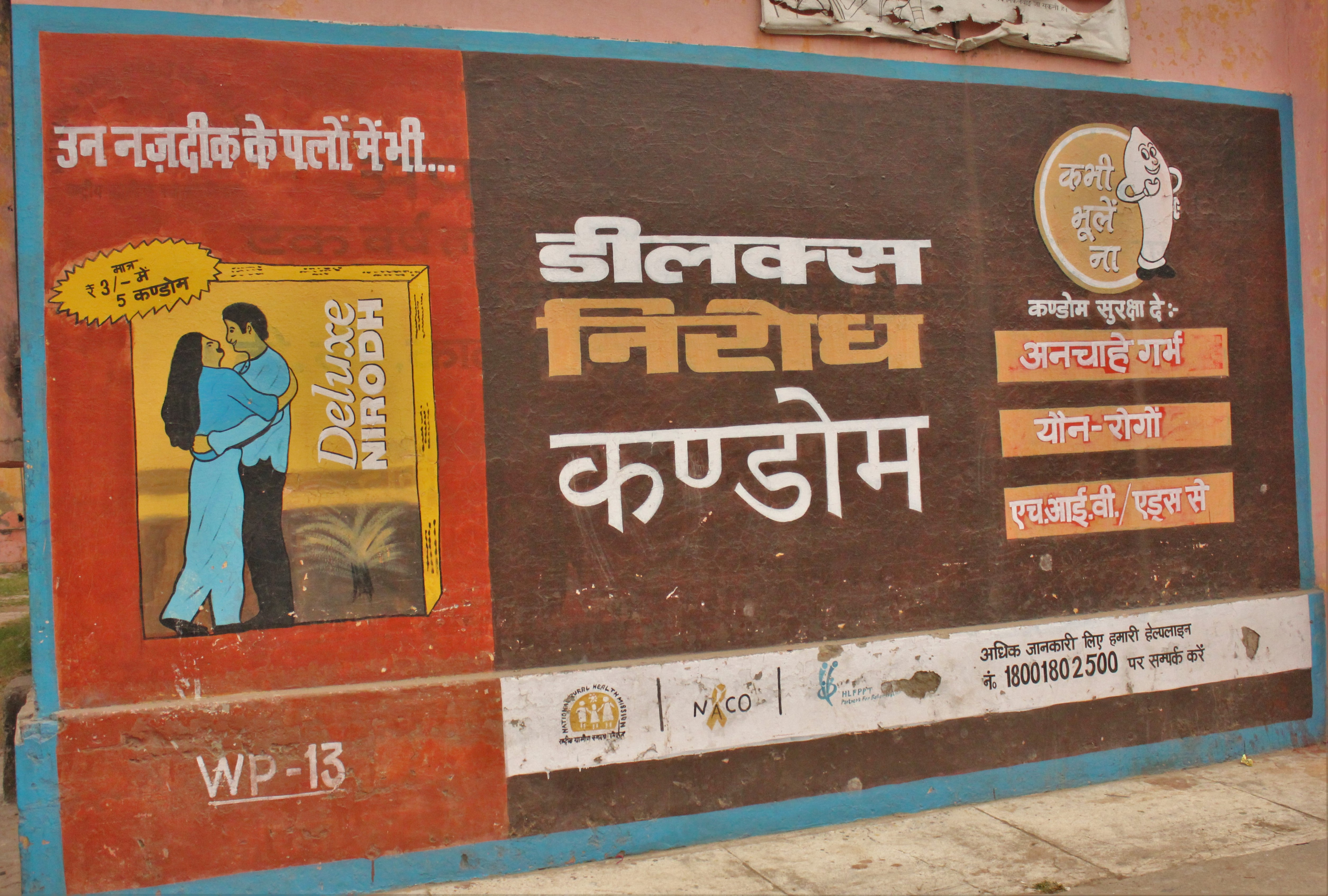
- Nirodh advertisement
- Product type: Condom
- Current owner: HLL Lifecare
- Produced by: HLL Lifecare
- Country: India
- Introduced: 1968
- Markets: India

Nirodh (a.k.a. Deluxe Nirodh) is the first condom brand produced in India. Introduced in 1968, the condom is credited with the success of the family planning and birth control campaign in the country. From 2.40% in 1964, India's population growth rate dropped to 1.80% by 2005 with the help of Nirodh. As of 2015, population growth rate of India was 1.26%.

The condom is manufactured by HLL Lifecare, a Government of India PSU healthcare products manufacturing company based in Thiruvananthapuram, Kerala. With 17% market share, Nirodh is the largest selling condom in India.

== History ==
Condoms have been available in India since the 1940s. By 1968 India had only one million condoms available in the market to serve a population of 470 million people (as of the 1964 census). With each condom selling at ₹0.25 (equivalent to ₹14 or 15¢ US in 2026), the cost of condoms in India was almost the same as in the United States. The population growth rate was highest among the low income group, which could not afford to purchase condoms. A team from the Indian Institutes of Management recommended to the Government that they make condoms available to the Indian public at affordable prices. It was recommended that India import condoms and sell them at ₹0.05 (equivalent to ₹3.00 or 3.2¢ US in 2026), one-fifth of the market price at the time per condom. 400 million condoms were therefore imported from the US, Japan and Korea in 1968. All of the condoms had identical packaging, with three condoms per packet, and were branded as Nirodh.

=== Branding and naming ===
In 1963, India's first mass-distributed condom was introduced. It was initially given the name of "Kamaraj" (pseudonym of Indian cupid Kamadeva), but K. Kamaraj was then the president of the ruling party, Indian National Congress, so a new name for the condom was chosen: "Nirodh", meaning "protection" in Hindi.

=== Plant and production ===
In 1966, Hindustan Latex (now called HLL Lifecare) was established in technical collaboration with Okamoto Industries of Japan. Operations of the first plant commenced on 5 April 1969 in Peroorkada, Thiruvananthapuram, with an annual production of 144 million condoms. In seven years the production had doubled to 288 million, and by 1985 another manufacturing plant was started in Belgaum, taking combined production capacity to 800 million condoms per year. As of 2007, HLL Lifecare produced largest variety of condoms in the world.

== Marketing and distribution ==
In September 1968, a distribution scheme for Nirodh was launched to create large scale demand for the condom. Distribution was done through three schemes:

1. Commercial distribution: This scheme was based on the principle that family planning in India can be promoted effectively by commercial distribution. Using modern marketing techniques such as newspaper & magazines, radio, television, movie theater, billboard and printed materials, Nirodh was promoted as a consumer product. Nirodh was made easily accessible to the public by a large number of retail outlets, and was sold at prices subsidized by the Government of India.
2. Free supply: Under the free supply scheme, Nirodh was distributed for free at Family Planning centers to interested couples. During the field trips, health workers also distributed free Nirodhs. For HIV/AIDS prevention, Nirodh is procured by Ministry of Health and Family Welfare and distributed for free by National AIDS Control Organisation using several centers formed by World Health Organization.
3. Depot holders: Introduced in 1969, under this scheme Nirodh was supplied to rural post offices for free. Post offices were allowed to sell Nirodh at very low prices and retain earnings as incentive.

== See also ==
- Family planning in India
