= Prevalence of birth control =

Percentage of women using modern contraception as of 2010

Globally approximately 45% of those who are married and able to have children use contraception. As of 2007, IUDs were used by about 17% of women of child bearing age in developing countries and 9% in developed countries or more than 180 million women worldwide. Avoiding sex when fertile is used by about 3.6% of women of childbearing age, with usage as high as 20% in areas of South America. As of 2005, 12% of couples are using a male form of contraception (either condoms or a vasectomy) with rates of up to 30% in the developed world.

As of 2012, 57% of women of child bearing age wanted to avoid pregnancy (867 of 1520 million). About 222 million women however were not able to access birth control, 53 million of whom were in sub-Saharan Africa and 97 million of whom were in Asia. Many countries limit access to birth control due to religious and political reasons.

== Africa ==
Contraceptive use among women in Sub-Saharan Africa has risen from about 5% in 1991 to about 30% in 2006. However, due to extreme poverty, lack of access to birth control, and restrictive abortion laws, many women still resort to clandestine abortion providers for unintended pregnancy, resulting in about 3% obtaining unsafe abortions each year. South Africa, Botswana, and Zimbabwe have successful family planning programs, but other central and southern African countries continue to encounter extreme difficulties in achieving higher contraceptive prevalence and lower fertility for a wide variety of compounding reasons.

== China ==
The one-child policy of the People's Republic of China required couples to have no more than one child. Beginning in 1979, the policy was implemented to control rapid population growth. Chinese women receive free contraception and family planning services. Greater than 70% of those of childbearing age use contraception. Since the policy was put into place in 1979, over 400 million births have been prevented. Because of various exemptions, fertility rate is about 1.7 children per woman, down from 5.9 in the 1960s. A strong preference for boys and free access to fetus sex determination and abortion has resulted in an artificially high proportion of males in both rural and urban areas.

Beginning January 1, 2016, China officially abolished the one-child policy. The Chinese government decided to allow families to have a second child to supposedly grow a bigger work force and allow the aging population to relax more. They predict that another economic boom will occur in the near future. The new policy was also seen as a solution to the massive gender disparity, with China's current population leaning heavily toward males. There are no concrete estimates for the new rate of growth of the Chinese population, but there are testimonies from the citizens about their new freedom. Some mothers have said that they are excited at the opportunity of having another child, while others still follow the one child tradition.

== India ==
The red triangle is used to indicate family planning products and services in many developing countries.

Awareness of contraception is near-universal among married women in India. However, the vast majority of married Indians (76% in a 2009 study) reported significant problems in accessing a choice of contraceptive methods. In 2009, 48.3% of married women were estimated to use a contraceptive method, i.e. more than half of all married women did not. About three-fourths of these were using female sterilization, which is by far the most prevalent birth-control method in India. Condoms, at a mere 3%, were the next most prevalent method. Meghalaya, Bihar and Uttar Pradesh had the lowest usage of contraception among all Indian states with rates below 30%.

== Pakistan ==
In 2011 just one in five Pakistani women aged 15 to 49 used modern birth control. In 1994, Pakistan pledged that by 2010 it would provide universal access to family planning. but contraception is shunned under traditional social norms. Most women who say they do not want any more children or would like to wait a period of time before their next pregnancy do not have the contraceptive resources available to them in order to do so. In the 1990s, women increasingly reported wanting fewer children, and 24 percent of recent births were reported to be unwanted or mistimed. The rate of unwanted pregnancies is higher for women living in poor or rural environments; with two-thirds of women live in rural areas. While 96 percent of married women were reported to know about at least one method of contraception, only half of them had ever used it. The most commonly reported reasons for married women electing not to use family planning methods include the belief that fertility should be determined by God (28%); opposition to use by the woman, her husband, others or a perceived religious prohibition (23%); infertility (15%); and concerns about health, side effects or the cost of family planning (12%).

== United Kingdom ==
Contraception has been available for free under the National Health Service since 1974, and 74% of reproductive age women use some form of contraception. The levonorgestrel intrauterine system has been massively popular. Sterilization is popular in older age groups, among those 45-49, 29% of men and 21% of women have been sterilized. Female sterilization has been declining since 1996, when the intrauterine system was introduced. Emergency contraception has been available since the 1970s, a product was specifically licensed for emergency contraception in 1984, and emergency contraceptives became available over the counter in 2001. Since becoming available over the counter it has not reduced the use of other forms of contraception, as some predicted it might. In any year only 5% of women of childbearing age use emergency hormonal contraception. Despite widespread availability of contraceptives, almost half of pregnancies were unintended circa 2005. Abortion was legalized in 1967, however still remained illegal in Northern Ireland until 2020.

== United States ==
As of 2008, in the United States, 99% of sexually active women have used birth control at some point in time. In 2015-2017, 64.9% of women aged 15-49 used a form of birth control. The most common forms of birth control were female sterilization (18.6%), oral contraceptive pills (12.6%), long-acting reversible contraceptives (10.3%), and male condoms (8.7%). Despite the availability of highly effective contraceptives, in 2011, 45% of pregnancies were unintended. In 2002, contraceptive use saved about $19 billion in direct medical costs.
