= Superstition in the Philippines =

In the Philippines, a handful of superstitious beliefs exist that are very famous amongst the natives. These beliefs are typically introduced to them at a very early age through children's books or bedtime stories. It is believed that if natives are not careful to follow them, a curse will befall them.

== Superstitious beliefs ==
=== Knocking on wood ===
A gesture performed by Filipinos in response to a negative comment or remark. It refers to a gesture commonly made by Filipinos as a reaction to an unpleasant, offensive, or negative statement made by another person. The gesture is sometimes accompanied by knocking on wood, a practice believed to repel bad luck or prevent a negative outcome from coming true.

=== Tabi-tabi po ===
A commonly spoken phrase used when passing through places believed to be inhabited by spirits, such as cemeteries or haunted grasslands. It is meant to show respect and reverence toward the spirits and supernatural entities believed to reside in these places. The practice is intended to demonstrate respect and reverence toward the spirits and supernatural beings that are believed to dwell in or around these locations. It reflects the belief that such entities should not be disturbed or treated disrespectfully, as doing so may lead to unforeseen consequences or supernatural encounters.

=== Tao po ===
A gesture done by Filipinos saying "tao po" in Philippine culture is a traditional way to announce your presence at someone's doorway, literally translating to "I am a person" or "A human is here." and not a spirit or monsters such as an aswang.

=== Pagpag ===
When coming from a wake, a Filipino practice would be not to go home straight away as it is believed that the soul of the dead would follow one back to their house. One may stop anywhere one wishes as long as one does not go straight home.

=== Sukob ===
It is believed that when two siblings, or sometimes first cousins, marry in the same year, one or both couples may face misfortune. This superstition associates such marriages with financial difficulties, illness, or even death.

If a child gets married in the same year that a parent or grandparent dies, it is also considered bad luck, as it is believed to bring misfortune to the family.

This superstition may have originated from practical concerns rather than supernatural beliefs. In older times, families often had limited resources, and hosting two weddings in the same year could lead to financial strain. It could also be linked to Filipino cultural values that emphasizes respect for the mourning period after a family member's death.

Sukob a Filipino superstition about a forbidden or unlucky circumstance, it was also the inspiration for the 2006 horror film of the same name, which popularized the superstition among younger generations.

== Filipino folklore ==
Philippine folklore includes many mythical creatures and spirits that have been preserved down through generations. These beings are often connected to nature, supernatural beliefs, and stories used to explain strange or frightening experiences. Kapre are giant supernatural beings believed to live in or sit on tall trees. They are commonly portrayed holding and smoking oversized cigarettes. Some stories say that kapres are attracted to beautiful young women and may appear in their dreams or visit them while they sleep. Tikbalang is a tall, human-like creature with the head and features of a horse. It is believed to live in forests and mountains. According to folklore, tikbalangs are believed to confuse or lead travelers astray when they enter their territory. The Tiyanak is often portrayed in Philippine folklore as the spirit of an unborn or deceased infant that takes the form of a seemingly helpless newborn. It may cry like a baby to attract people, especially in isolated or remote places. When someone approaches, the tiyanak reveals its frightening nature. Nuno sa punso are small, dwarf-like supernatural beings believed to live inside mounds, hills, or piles of earth. They are usually invisible from humans and are thought to protect their homes. Traditional stories warn people to respect these places and avoid disturbing them. Manananggal, Aswang, and Tiktik are among the most feared creatures in Philippine folklore. Aswangs are often described as shape-shifting, flesh-eating monsters that can appear human during the day and prey at night. Manananggal are especially known for separating their upper bodies from their lower bodies and flying at night. In some stories, manananggal and tiktik are believed to target pregnant women and their unborn babies. Diwata are supernatural fairies, nature spirits and goddesses associated with forests, mountains, rivers, and other natural places. They are often described as enchanting and powerful beings who can help or protect people. In many stories, diwatas are believed to bring guidance, prosperity, protection, and good fortune to those they bless.

== Filipino witchcraft ==
=== Pagkukulam ===
A Filipino witch or mangkukulam is a person who casts spells, curses, or black magic on the people they want to take revenge on. This practice involves the use of a voodoo doll and a needle along with the candle-lighting rituals and anything performed on the doll will also be felt by the victim.

=== Gayuma ===
Gayuma is as a form of magic designed to enchant or attract a person, often taking the form of a love potion. It is often associated with romantic intentions and may involve the use of a love potion or other magical practices believed to encourage someone to develop affection, attraction, or love.

=== Albularyo ===
Albularyo or faith healers are very common in the Philippines, especially in the rural areas. They use herbs as their main healing instrument, often preparing them as traditional remedies to treat various ailments and promote healing. Their healing abilities are believed to be remarkably effective, because they are said to treat illnesses using only their hands, accompanied by traditional chants, spiritual rituals, and prayers.

== Sources ==
1. Clark, Jordan (3 March 2016). "The Diwata of Philippine Mythology". The Aswang Project.
2. Escalona, Katrina (31 July 2017). "9 Superstitions Many Filipinos Still Believe". Culture Trip.
3. "How Love Spells or Gayuma Work?". Babaylan Adlaw.
4. Prestosa, Rosabelle (14 January 2019). "Witchcraft Practice in the Philippines". Medium.com.
5. Simisim, Francis (27 October 2011). "Top 10 Scariest Local Filipino Monsters in the Philippines". When in Manila.
