= Family planning in India =

Map of countries by fertility rate. India's fertility rate has greatly decreased in recent years and is now distinctly below the global rate.

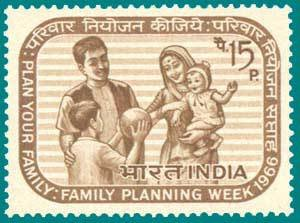
1966 family planning stamp from India

Family planning in India is based on efforts largely sponsored by the Indian government. From 1966 to 2009, contraceptive usage has more than tripled (from 13% of married women in 1970 to 48% in 2009) and the fertility rate has more than halved (from 5.7 in 1966 to 2.4 in 2012), but the national fertility rate in absolute numbers remains high, causing concern for long-term population growth. India adds up to 1,000,000 people to its population every 20 days. Extensive family planning has become a priority in an effort to curb the projected population of two billion by the end of the twenty-first century.

In 2016, the total fertility rate of India was 2.30 births per woman and 15.6 million abortions performed, with an abortion rate of 47.0 abortions per 1000 women aged between 15 and 49 years. With high abortions rates follows a high number of unintended pregnancies, with a rate of 70.1 unintended pregnancies per 1000 women aged 15–49 years. Overall, the abortions occurring in India make up for one third of pregnancies and out of all pregnancies occurring, almost half were not planned. On the Demographic Transition Model, India falls in the third stage due to decreased birth rates and death rates. In 2026, it is projected to be in stage four once the Total Fertility Rate reaches 2.1.

== Contraceptive usage ==
The red triangle indicates family planning products and services in India.

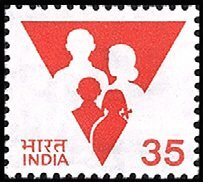
Family planning stamp of India with the red triangle, 1987

Women in India are not being fully educated on contraception usage and what they are putting in their bodies. From 2005 to 2006 data was collected to indicate only 15.6% of women using contraception in India were informed of all their options and what those options actually do. Contraceptive usage has been rising gradually in India. In 1970, 13% of married women used modern contraceptive methods, which rose to 35% by 1997 and 48% by 2009.

Awareness of contraception is near-universal among married women in India. However, the vast majority of married Indians (76% in a 2009 study) reported significant problems in accessing a choice of contraceptive methods. The above table clearly indicates more evidence that the availability of contraceptives is a problem for people in India. In 2009, 48.4% of married women were estimated to use a contraceptive method. About three-fourths of these were using female sterilization which is by far the most prevalent birth-control method in India. Condoms, at a mere 3%, were the next most prevalent method. Meghalaya, at 20%, had the lowest usage of contraception among all Indian states. Bihar and Uttar Pradesh were the other two states that reported usage below 30%.

Sterilization is a common practice in India. Contraceptive practices in India are heavily skewed towards terminal methods like sterilization, which means that contraception is practiced primarily for birth limitation rather than birth planning. It is common to use camps to enforce sterilization. This process can be done with or without consent.

Comparative studies have indicated that increased female literacy is correlated strongly with a decline in fertility. Studies have indicated that female literacy levels are an independent strong predictor of the use of contraception, even when women do not otherwise have economic independence. Female literacy levels in India may be the primary factor that help in population stabilisation, but they are improving relatively slowly: a 1990 study estimated that it would take until 2060 for India to achieve universal literacy at the current rate of progress.

In 2015, there was an average 58% of women who used contraceptives, with female sterilization still being the most preferred and favored among 91% of women. Higher rates of sterilization are seen among women who hold less education than those with more education. Those with higher education have lower rates due to the delay of getting married and childbirth. 77% of the women who underwent sterilization had not used an alternative contraception prior to the procedure and most women were under the age of 26, who seem to have many options available in regards to protection. The preoccupation with birth limitation by India's family planning programme has meant that it has not been able to successfully reach young married women who are in the process of building their family and enable them to meet their family planning intentions.

According to Family Planning 2020, in 2017 there were 136,569,000 women using modern method contraception which prevented: 39,170,000 unintended pregnancies, 11,966,000 unsafe abortions, and 42,000 maternal deaths due to family planning. In 2012, India's modern contraception prevalence rate among all women was 39.2, in 2017 it was 39.57, and in 2020 is predicted to rise to 40.87.

== Family planning programme ==
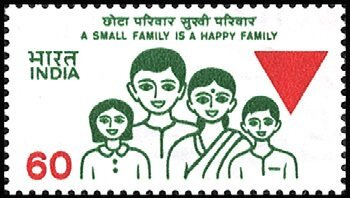
A family planning stamp from 1989

The Ministry of Health and Family Welfare is the government unit responsible for formulating and executing family planning in India. An inverted red triangle is the symbol for family planning health and contraception services in India. In addition to the newly implemented government campaign, improved healthcare facilities, increased education for women, and higher participation among women in the workforce have helped lower fertility rates in many Indian cities. The objectives of the program are positioned towards achieving the goals stated in several policy documents. While India is improving in fertility rates, there are still areas of India that maintain much higher fertility rates.

In 2017, Ministry of Health and Family Welfare launched Mission Pariwar Vikas, a central family planning initiative. The key strategic focus of this initiative is on improving access to contraceptives through delivering assured services, ensuring commodity security and accelerating access to high quality family planning services. its overall goal is to reduce India's overall fertility rate to 2.1 by the year 2025. Along with that two contraceptive pills, MPA (Medroxyprogesterone acetate) under Antara program and Chaya (earlier marketed as Saheli) will be made freely available to all government hospitals.

Family planning program benefits not only parents and children but also to society and nation, by being able to keep the number of new births under control allows for less population growth. With less population growth this will allow for more resources towards those already existing in the Indian population, with more resources comes longer life expectancy and better health.

== Fertility rate ==
India's current fertility rate as of 2024, is 2.1 births per woman. The fertility rate (average number of children born per woman during her lifetime) in India has been declining and it had reached the average replacement rate in 2019. The average replacement rate is 2.1. (This rate is said to stabilize a population) Replacement rate can be defined as the rate at which the population exactly replaces itself. Factoring in infant mortality, the replacement rate is approximately 2.1 in most industrialised nations and about 2.5 in developing nations (due to higher mortality). The fertility rates in India have dropped rapidly in rural areas, but are dropping at a stable rate in urban and populated areas. Although this seems promising, two-thirds of India's population resides in rural areas, adding to the decreased fertility rate. Discounting immigration and population momentum effects, a nation that crosses below the replacement rate is on the path to population stabilisation and, eventually, population reduction. There have been several factors influencing recent trends in Indian fertility including, but not limited to: limitation of family planning ability, age at marriage/childbirth, and the space between children born to one woman. Although India is dealing with major overpopulation issues, the fertility rate and the overall population growth is declining.

=== Historical fertility trend ===
The fertility rate in India has been in long-term decline, and more than halved from 1960 to 2009. From 5.7 births per woman in 1966, it declined to 3.3 births per woman by 1997 and 2.7 births per woman in 2009. In 2005 the TFR, (total fertility rate), was listed as 2.9 births per women. Since this time, the country has recorded a steady decline in order to reach the current rate (as of 2024) of 2.1 births per woman.

=== State and country comparisons ===
Twenty Indian states have dipped below the 2.1 replacement rate level and are no longer contributing to Indian population growth. The total fertility rate of India stands at 2.1 as of 2024. Four Indian states have fertility rates above 3.5 - Bihar, Uttar Pradesh, Meghalaya and Nagaland Of these, Bihar has a fertility rate of 4.0 births per woman, the highest of any Indian state. For detailed state figures and rankings, see Indian states ranking by fertility rate.

In 2009, India had a lower estimated fertility rate than Pakistan and Bangladesh, but a higher fertility rate than China, Iran, Myanmar and Sri Lanka.

According to Jin Rou New and colleagues research and data they were able to compile enough data to create the following table.

TABLE 1: Showing data in regards to contraception use in India
State	Prevalence of modern contraceptive use in 2015	Unmet need for modern methods in 2015	Demand satisfied with modern methods in 2015	Change in prevalence of modern contraceptive use, 1990–2015	Prevalence of modern contraceptive use in 2030	Unmet need for modern methods in 2030	Demand satisfied with modern methods in 2030	Increase in percentage of users of modern methods required to meet 75% demand satisfied target compared with 2015	Additional number of users of modern methods (millions) required to meet 75% demand satisfied target compared with 2015
Andhra Pradesh	69.8 (65.8 to 73.5)	5.5 (4.5 to 6.7)	92.7 (90.9 to 94.2)	25.1 (14.2 to 36.2)	70.5 (51.4 to 84.2)	6.5 (2.7 to 13.9)	91.5 (79.4 to 96.9)	..	..
Arunachal Pradesh	47.2 (36.4 to 58.0)	23.3 (16.3 to 31.2)	66.9 (55.3 to 77.4)	29.6 (16.9 to 42.3)	55.4 (35.4 to 73.9)	18.9 (9.4 to 31.8)	74.5 (54.1 to 88.4)	8.8 (–3.0 to 20.0)	0.04 (0.02 to 0.06)
Assam	40.9 (28.9 to 52.9)	35.6 (25.5 to 47.7)	53.5 (38.3 to 67.0)	21.7 (7.6 to 35.4)	48.5 (26.0 to 69.1)	28.6 (14.1 to 50.0)	62.9 (35.3 to 82.6)	17.5 (4.1 to 31.0)	1.37 (0.72 to 2.01)
Bihar	26.0 (22.5 to 29.9)	22.9 (20.5 to 25.6)	53.1 (48.0 to 58.3)	6.3 (–1.7 to 13.3)	41.0 (24.4 to 60.0)	21.2 (12.5 to 31.1)	65.6 (46.7 to 82.3)	21.2 (9.9 to 30.7)	5.08 (3.04 to 6.78)
Chhattisgarh	57.0 (46.4 to 67.1)	16.7 (11.2 to 23.6)	77.3 (67.2 to 85.4)	26.0 (–0.5 to 49.1)	60.9 (40.8 to 77.9)	14.9 (6.7 to 26.9)	80.2 (61.6 to 91.9)	..	..
Delhi	58.0 (42.3 to 72.0)	19.6 (11.3 to 31.7)	74.7 (57.9 to 86.2)	6.4 (–12.1 to 23.7)	60.3 (38.7 to 78.0)	18.0 (8.1 to 33.8)	77.0 (54.7 to 90.4)	0.9 (–12.5 to 16.0)	0.54 (0.21 to 0.90)
Goa	25.7 (22.3 to 29.6)	20.1 (17.9 to 22.5)	56.1 (51.0 to 61.1)	–10.0 (−20.0 to −0.5)	38.8 (22.7 to 57.5)	20.8 (12.6 to 30.6)	64.9 (45.8 to 81.2)	19.5 (8.1 to 29.5)	0.06 (0.03 to 0.09)
Gujarat	57.6 (41.9 to 71.4)	16.7 ( 9.6 to 27.3)	77.5 (61.6 to 87.9)	13.0 (–5.6 to 30.5)	60.5 (38.8 to 78.7)	15.3 (6.8 to 29.6)	79.7 (58.3 to 91.8)	..	..
Haryana	58.4 (54.0 to 62.5)	13.8 (12.0 to 15.8)	80.9 (77.7 to 83.7)	16.4 (5.9 to 26.7)	60.9 (41.9 to 77.0)	13.8 (6.8 to 24.4)	81.4 (64.4 to 91.7)	..	..
Himachal Pradesh	58.7 (47.8 to 68.8)	15.5 (9.8 to 22.8)	79.1 (68.4 to 87.2)	6.8 (–7.8 to 21.1)	62.1 (41.9 to 78.9)	13.8 (6.1 to 25.5)	81.8 (63.2 to 92.8)	..	..
Jammu and Kashmir	47.6 (32.3 to 62.7)	24.2 (15.0 to 36.0)	66.2 (49.0 to 80.3)	10.4 (–7.7 to 28.2)	53.4 (32.3 to 72.8)	20.9 (10.0 to 36.9)	71.7 (48.1 to 87.7)	8.3 (–6.0 to 23.3)	0.34 (0.11 to 0.57)
Jharkhand	45.9 (35.0 to 56.5)	28.6 (20.7 to 37.7)	61.5 (49.0 to 72.6)	28.4 (4.5 to 46.5)	54.1 (32.8 to 73.1)	22.8 (11.4 to 39.3)	70.2 (46.6 to 86.2)	12.1 (0.0 to 23.4)	1.18 (0.55 to 1.75)
Karnataka	54.1 (49.4 to 58.8)	10.9 (9.3 to 12.7)	83.2 (79.9 to 86.1)	9.0 (–2.0 to 20.1)	59.7 (40.2 to 76.7)	11.4 (5.1 to 20.4)	84.0 (67.6 to 93.6)	..	..
Kerala	54.7 (44.0 to 64.9)	19.6 (13.2 to 27.3)	73.6 (62.6 to 82.6)	3.0 (–11.0 to 17.0)	58.1 (38.6 to 75.0)	17.9 (8.8 to 31.2)	76.4 (56.4 to 89.3)	2.4 (–9.0 to 13.4)	0.55 (–0.18 to 1.25)
Madhya Pradesh	52.4 (47.7 to 57.0)	14.2 (12.4 to 16.3)	78.6 (75.0 to 81.8)	16.5 (–7.1 to 37.8)	58.3 (39.3 to 75.0)	13.9 (6.8 to 23.7)	80.7 (63.8 to 91.5)	..	..
Maharashtra	63.5 (59.1 to 67.5)	11.7 (10.1 to 13.5)	84.4 (81.6 to 86.9)	13.0 (2.2 to 24.0)	65.4 (46.5 to 80.5)	11.5 (5.2 to 21.3)	85.0 (69.4 to 93.8)	..	..
Manipur	14.7 ( 8.9 to 22.3)	40.3 (30.9 to 50.4)	26.8 (16.7 to 38.5)	–7.7 (–17.6 to 2.4)	28.8 (13.2 to 48.8)	35.0 (22.2 to 50.9)	44.9 (22.5 to 67.2)	33.8 (21.6 to 44.3)	0.15 (0.11 to 0.19)
Meghalaya	21.1 (18.1 to 24.5)	25.7 (23.1 to 28.5)	45.0 (40.1 to 50.0)	7.6 (1.2 to 13.2)	35.5 (19.8 to 54.3)	25.4 (16.1 to 36.1)	57.9 (38.4 to 76.2)	25.3 (14.1 to 34.7)	0.13 (0.08 to 0.17)
Mizoram	60.1 (48.9 to 70.3)	16.4 (10.2 to 24.4)	78.5 (67.3 to 87.1)	8.7 (–6.5 to 23.5)	63.3 (43.1 to 80.1)	13.5 (5.5 to 25.4)	82.4 (63.7 to 93.6)	..	..
Nagaland	37.0 (21.7 to 54.3)	29.8 (19.8 to 41.3)	55.2 (36.7 to 72.5)	25.0 (8.7 to 43.1)	49.1 (27.7 to 70.8)	23.7 (11.7 to 39.4)	67.2 (43.3 to 85.4)	17.8 (2.4 to 32.2)	0.06 (0.02 to 0.10)
Odisha	48.3 (37.3 to 59.2)	26.6 (18.8 to 36.2)	64.5 (51.4 to 75.5)	15.7 (1.0 to 29.9)	54.8 (34.0 to 73.0)	21.4 (10.7 to 37.8)	71.9 (48.8 to 87.0)	9.2 (–2.9 to 21.0)	1.25 (0.39 to 2.04)
Punjab	60.3 (49.7 to 69.9)	15.1 (9.9 to 21.9)	79.9 (70.2 to 87.3)	12.0 (–2.0 to 25.9)	77.1 (64.2 to 87.0)	14.7 (6.9 to 26.8)	80.7 (62.2 to 91.6)	..	..
Rajasthan	62.3 (51.8 to 71.2)	16.0 (10.8 to 23.0)	79.5 (69.9 to 86.6)	33.9 (20.1 to 46.4)	65.5 (45.2 to 81.3)	13.9 (6.3 to 26.5)	82.4 (63.9 to 92.7)	..	..
Sikkim	48.4 (43.4 to 53.3)	22.3 (19.6 to 25.3)	68.5 (63.6 to 72.8)	16.8 (–1.3 to 32.9)	55.7 (36.3 to 73.3)	18.7 (9.3 to 30.5)	74.7 (55.6 to 88.5)	7.7 (–2.1 to 15.7)	0.02 (0.01 to 0.03)
Tamil Nadu	53.7 (48.9 to 58.5)	11.4 ( 9.8 to 13.2)	82.5 (79.0 to 85.4)	10.8 (–0.2 to 21.5)	59.2 (39.9 to 75.9)	11.7 (5.4 to 20.6)	83.5 (67.0 to 93.2)	..	..
Tripura	43.1 (38.5 to 47.8)	31.9 (27.0 to 37.8)	57.5 (50.8 to 63.5)	14.3 (3.7 to 24.1)	49.8 (29.0 to 68.6)	26.3 (13.8 to 45.3)	65.3 (40.1 to 82.9)	14.7 (4.9 to 23.3)	0.17 (0.10 to 0.22)
Uttar Pradesh	40.7 (29.8 to 52.0)	35.0 (25.8 to 45.5)	53.7 (40.1 to 66.3)	24.1 (11.3 to 36.9)	51.7 (29.8 to 71.2)	26.2 (13.3 to 44.9)	66.2 (41.5 to 84.1)	18.0 (5.5 to 30.2)	9.18 (5.53 to 12.61)
Uttarakhand	50.9 (46.3 to 55.3)	19.9 (17.5 to 22.6)	71.8 (67.7 to 75.6)	15.2 (–8.3 to 36.7)	56.4 (37.7 to 73.7)	17.6 (9.0 to 29.3)	76.1 (57.3 to 89.0)	5.0 (–4.6 to 13.2)	0.26 (0.09 to 0.39)
West Bengal	57.5 (52.9 to 61.9)	21.7 (17.8 to 26.6)	72.6 (66.8 to 77.4)	21.7 (10.8 to 32.3)	59.6 (39.1 to 75.7)	19.9 (10.0 to 37.3)	74.9 (52.1 to 88.1)	2.6 (–6.5 to 10.4)	2.10 (0.51 to 3.44)

== Family in Pronatalist India ==
India carries a pronatalist attitude towards fertility, with the large family structure creating an environment for new children to learn and grow in Indian culture. In many parts of India, male children are favored over female children, however efforts are being taken to change this attitude. Males are raised to be assertive and independent figures, while females are raised to put others before themselves, particularly their family. Families tend to encourage childbearing and expect to provide an environment of support for any new members of the family, raising the children based on Indian family practices and beliefs. Children are not encouraged to be independent or assist the family from an early age, rather the family expects to support and provide for the child until they reach adolescence.

== Two-Child Policy ==
Multiple Indian states have adopted a limited Two-child policy. The policies are implemented by prohibiting persons with more than two children from serving in government. The most recent policy to be implemented was by Assam in 2017. Some states have repealed policies; Chhattisgarh introduced a policy in 2001 and repealed it in 2005.

A criticism of these policies is that it decreases the number of women in government positions, and encourages sex-selective abortions.

The policy was geared mainly towards politicians, future and aspiring, to limit their number of children to two or less. Those who held politicians have stricter policies in hopes that they will set an example for the community, if one were to exceed the limit of two children while employed, they would be terminated from the job. Non-politicians may also receive consequences to exceed the two child limit, the government begins to withhold health care, government rights, face jail and, fees.

== Modern Initiatives in Reproductive Health ==
Progress on reproductive health and family planning has been limited. As of 2016, India's infant mortality rate is 34.6 per 1000 livebirths, and as of 2015, maternal mortality sits at 174 per 100,000 livebirths. Leading causes of maternal mortality include hemorrhage, sepsis, complications of abortion, and hypertensive disorders, and infection, premature birth, birth asphyxia, pneumonia, and diarrhea for infants. In 2005, the Government of India established the National Rural Health Mission (NRHM) in effort to address some of these issues amongst others. The objective of the NRHM includes the provision of effective healthcare to rural areas, especially to poor and vulnerable populations. Through the NRHM, special provisions have been made to address concerns for reproductive health, especially for adolescents who are more likely to participate in risky sexual behaviors and less likely to visit health facilities than adults. Ultimately, the NRHM aims to push India towards the Millennium Development Goal targets for reproductive health.

== History of Family Planning Programmes ==
Raghunath Dhondo Karve published a Marathi-language magazine Samaj Swasthya (समाज स्वास्थ्य) starting from July 1927 until 1953. In it, he continually discussed issues of society's well-being involving population control through use of contraceptives. He explained the use of contraception would help prevent unwanted pregnancies and induced abortions. Karve proposed that the Indian Government should take up a population control programme, but was met with opposition. Mahatma Gandhi was the main opponent of birth control. His opposition was the result of his belief that self-control is the best contraceptive. However, Periyar's views were strikingly different from that of Gandhi. He saw birth control as a means for women to control their own lives.

In 1952, India became the first country in the developing world to create a state-sponsored family planning program, the National Family Planning Program. The program's primary objectives were to lower fertility rates and slow population growth as a means to propel economic development. The program was based on five guiding principles:

1. "The community must be prepared to feel the need for the services in order that, when provided, these may be accepted
2. Parents alone must decide the number of children they want and their obligations towards them
3. People should be approached through the media they respect and their recognized and trusted leaders and without offending their religious and moral values and susceptibilities
4. Services should be made available to the people as near to their doorsteps as possible
5. Services have greater relevance and effectiveness if made an integral part of medical and public health services and especially of maternal and child health programs"

The program was tied to a series of five year plans (based on the objective of the Gadgil formula which evolved in 1969) aimed at economic growth and restructuring which were carried out over 28 years, from 1952 to 1979. Over the course of this period, preferred birth control methods shifted from the rhythm method eventually to a focus on sterilization and IUDs.

Since the beginning, India's family planning program was marred by a "vertical approach" rather than working on additional factors. These factors affecting population growth include poverty, education, public health care. Owing to the foreign aid flowing in for the family planning programs, there has always been a foreign intervention in designing the family planning programs in India without assessing the actual socio-economic conditions of the country. In the early 1970s, Indira Gandhi, Prime Minister of India, had implemented a forced sterilisation programme, but failed. Officially, men with two children or more had to submit to sterilisation, but many unmarried young men, political opponents and ignorant, poor men were also believed to have been sterilised. This program is still remembered and criticised in India, and is blamed for creating a public aversion to family planning, which hampered Government programs for decades. After Emergency the focus of family planning program shifted to women as sterilising men proved to be politically expensive.

Over the course of the program, family planning in India resulted in a 19.9% decrease in birth rate where it has since stagnated at 35 births per 1000 persons. By 1996, the program had been estimated to have averted 16.8 crore births. This is due in part to government intervention which established many clinics as well as the enforcement of fines for those who avoided family planning. Additionally, there was high variance between regions in the use of family planning. However, maternal and infant morbidity and mortality rates remain high along with the number of unsafe abortions, and little is known about the prevalence of sexually transmitted diseases.

== See also ==
- List of states and union territories of India by fertility rate
- Total fertility rate
- One-child policy in China
- Birth control
- Human population planning
- Population Control Bill, 2019
