= Unión Espiritista Cristiana de Filipinas, Inc. =

Philippine religious association

Union Espiritista Cristiana de Filipinas, Incorporada (Union of Christian Spiritists in the Philippines) is a Spiritual (religious) Association with more than a thousand affiliated local and foreign based centers (churches), and considered as the biggest association of Christian spiritists in the Philippines. Foreign based centers are located in California, Texas, Canada, Hong Kong, Macau, Taiwan, Singapore, Greece, Qatar, Dubai, Abu Dhabi, Hawaii, Germany, Italy, and Russia, where there are large Filipino communities. Union members are called "Christian Spiritists".

== History ==
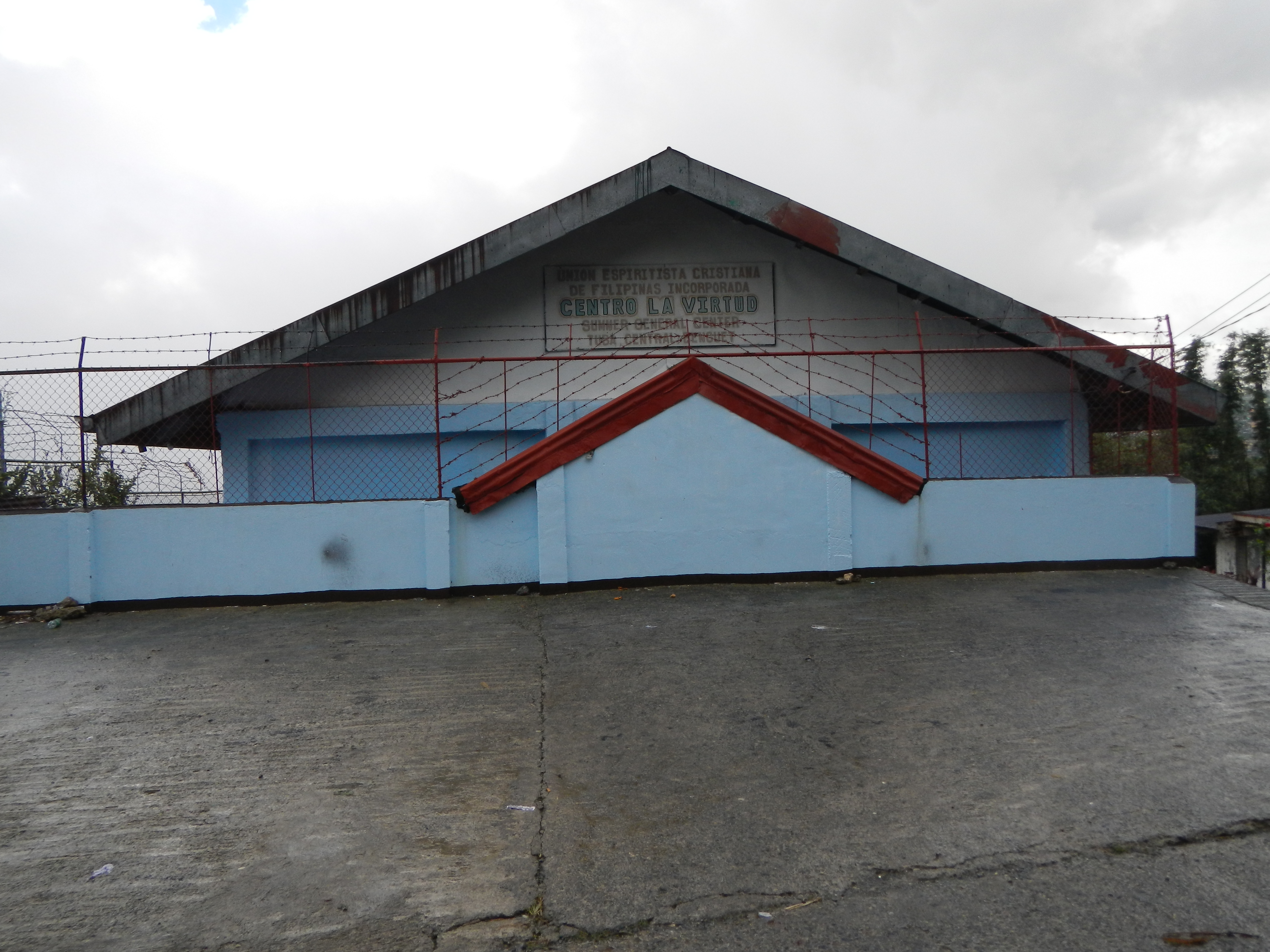
A Unión Espiritista Cristiana place of worship in Tuba, Benguet

The Unión Espiritista Cristiana de Filipinas was founded on 19 February 1905, when a group of spiritists in Pangasinan joined another group in Manila intending to organize a congregation uniting all spiritists in the Philippines. On 19 February 1909, the founders signed the Escritura social (articles of incorporation) and named the religious association "Unión Espiritista Cristiana de Filipinas, Inc."

In the 1920's, some of the officers and members of the Union began holding sessions in Baliwag, Bulacan. The center was formally inaugurated in 1926.

In the later years, a member and medium of the Union from Malabon, Rizal, visited the center. Members claim that the medium experienced a direct revelation from the Archangel Michael supporting the belief of the members in Christian Spiritism, and introduced direct mediumship.
