= List of countries and dependencies by population density =

Population density (people per km^{2}) by country

The following is a list of countries and dependencies ranked by population density, sorted by inhabitants per square kilometre or square mile. The list includes sovereign states and self-governing dependent territories based upon the ISO standard ISO 3166-1. The list also includes unrecognized but de facto independent countries. The figures in the table are based on areas including internal bodies of water such as bays, lakes, reservoirs and rivers. The list does not include entities not on ISO 3166-1, except for states with limited recognition. Thus constituent countries that are not included on ISO 3166-1, and other entities not on ISO 3166-1 such as the European Union, are not included.

Unless otherwise noted, areas and populations are sourced from the United Nations World Population Prospects, (Note: See the Data Portal at the World Population Prospects site.) which uses the latest censuses and official figures, as well as figures from the Food and Agriculture Organization, an agency of the UN. The data is from 2025, so any changes from 2025 to 2026 will not have been recorded.

== List ==
- Links for each location go to the relevant demography page, when available.
- Dependencies are shown with their parent states in parentheses.

List of countries and dependencies showing population densities, populations, and areas
Location	Density		Population	Land area		Ref.
Location	/km^{2}	/mi^{2}	Population	km^{2}	mi^{2}	Ref.
World	55	140	8,231,613,070	148,940,000	57,510,000	(Note: Density is 60/km^{2} (143/mi^{2}) when excluding Antarctica.)
Macau (China)	21,826	56,530	720,262	33	13	
Monaco	19,428	50,320	38,857	2	0.77	
Singapore	8,290	21,500	6,110,200	737	285	
Hong Kong (China)	7,062	18,290	7,414,910	1,050	410	
Gibraltar (UK)	5,800	15,000	39,329	6.8	2.6	(Note: Land figure is official while the CIA states zero water area.)
Vatican City	2,205	5,710	882	0.44	0.17	(Note: The De Agostini Atlas Calendar (in Italian) listed the area of Vatican City as 0.44 km^{2} (0.17 sq mi) in its 1930 edition but corrected it to 0.49 km^{2} (0.19 sq mi) in its 1945–46 edition. The figure of 0.44 km^{2} (0.17 sq mi) is widely cited by many sources (e.g. Encyclopedia Britannica) and it is the official figure. In 2018, there were 618 citizens regardless of residence, including 246 resident citizens. In 2024, there were 882 residents regardless of citizenship. The population density is calculated using the number of residents regardless of citizenship and the area of 0.44 km^{2} (0.17 sq mi).)
Bahrain	2,034	5,270	1,607,049	790	310	
Maldives	1,759	4,560	527,799	298	115	
Malta	1,686	4,370	539,607	320	120	
Bangladesh	1,362	3,530	178,562,364	130,170	50,260	
Sint Maarten (NL)	1,275	3,300	43,351	34	13	
Bermuda (UK)	1,197	3,100	64,637	54	21	
Palestine	892	2,310	5,371,230	6,020	2,320	(Note: While the Palestinian Authority is the recognized government for both the Gaza Strip and the West Bank, the Gaza Strip has been de-facto independent from it since 2007. The West Bank has a population density of 575/km^{2} (1,490/sq mi), and the Gaza Strip 5,950/km^{2} (15,400/sq mi).)
Jersey (UK)	891	2,310	103,387	116	45	
Guernsey (UK)	867	2,250	67,642	78	30	(Note: Population estimate is from the CIA. The Bailiwick of Guernsey comprises Guernsey proper (64,037), Alderney (2,141) and Sark (562). The UN estimate of 63,544 may exclude the smaller islands.)
Barbados	657	1,700	282,468	430	170	
Taiwan	656	1,700	23,213,962	35,410	13,670	
Mauritius	637	1,650	1,271,169	1,997	771	
Aruba (NL)	600	1,600	108,066	180	69	
Nauru	597	1,550	11,947	20	7.7	
Rwanda	578	1,500	14,256,567	24,670	9,530	
Lebanon	568	1,470	5,805,962	10,230	3,950	
Saint Barthélemy (France)	563	1,460	11,258	20	7.7	
San Marino	560	1,500	33,581	60	23	
Burundi	547	1,420	14,047,786	25,680	9,920	
Netherlands	541	1,400	18,080,943	33,670	13,000	
South Korea	530	1,400	51,717,590	97,600	37,700	
Saint Martin (France)	523	1,350	26,129	50	19	
Israel	468	1,210	10,148,000	21,640	8,360	
Comoros	466	1,210	866,628	1,861	719	
India	441	1,140	1,450,935,791	3,287,263	1,269,219	
Haiti	427	1,110	11,772,557	27,560	10,640	
Curaçao (NL)	418	1,080	185,482	444	171	
Philippines	389	1,010	115,843,670	298,170	115,120	
Belgium	385	1,000	11,738,764	30,494	11,774	
Sri Lanka	373	970	23,103,565	61,860	23,880	
Puerto Rico (US)	366	950	3,242,204	8,870	3,420	
Grenada	345	890	117,208	340	130	
Japan	340	880	123,753,041	364,500	140,700	
Tuvalu	322	830	9,646	30	12	
Guam (US)	311	810	167,777	540	210	
Cayman Islands (UK)	310	800	74,458	240	93	
Vietnam	309	800	102,300,000	331,212	127,882	
El Salvador	306	790	6,338,193	20,720	8,000	
Saint Lucia	295	760	179,744	610	240	
Trinidad and Tobago	294	760	1,507,782	5,130	1,980	
Pakistan	289	750	255,300,000	882,363	340,682	
United Kingdom	287	740	69,483,939	242,494	93,627	(Note: Population, land area and population density figures are from the UK's Office for National Statistics 2025 population estimates.)
Seychelles	284	740	130,419	460	180	
Saint Vincent and the Grenadines	281	730	109,296	389	150	
Kuwait	277	720	4,934,508	17,820	6,880	
Gambia	273	710	2,759,988	10,120	3,910	
Qatar	265	690	3,048,423	11,490	4,440	
British Virgin Islands (UK)	263	680	39,471	150	58	
Jamaica	262	680	2,839,175	10,830	4,180	
Luxembourg	261	680	673,036	2,575	994	
Nigeria	255	660	232,679,478	910,770	351,650	
Tokelau (New Zealand)	251	650	2,507	10	3.9	
Uganda	249	640	50,015,093	200,520	77,420	
Liechtenstein	249	640	39,870	160	62	
São Tomé and Príncipe	245	630	235,537	960	370	
U.S. Virgin Islands (US)	243	630	84,905	350	140	
Germany	242	630	84,552,242	349,360	134,890	
Dominican Republic	237	610	11,427,557	48,198	18,609	
American Samoa (US)	234	610	46,765	200	77	
Malawi	230	600	21,655,286	94,280	36,400	
Switzerland	226	590	8,921,981	39,510	15,250	
North Korea	220	570	26,498,823	120,410	46,490	
Antigua and Barbuda	213	550	93,772	440	170	
Marshall Islands	209	540	37,548	180	69	
Nepal	207	540	29,651,055	143,350	55,350	
Italy	201	520	59,342,867	295,720	114,180	
Saint Kitts and Nevis	180	470	46,843	260	100	
Togo	175	450	9,515,236	54,390	21,000	
Andorra	174	450	81,938	470	180	
Guatemala	172	450	18,406,359	107,160	41,370	
Kiribati	170	440	138,000	810	310	
Bonaire (NL)	169	440	26,552	288	111	
Saba (NL)	166	430	2,158	13	5.0	
Anguilla (UK)	162	420	14,599	90	35	
Federated States of Micronesia	162	420	113,161	700	270	
Sint Eustatius (NL)	156	400	3,270	21	8.1	
United Arab Emirates	155	400	11,027,129	71,020	27,420	
Kosovo	154	400	1,674,125	10,887	4,203	(Note: Area data from CIA.)
Ghana	151	390	34,427,414	227,533	87,851	
China	151	390	1,419,321,278	9,388,210	3,624,810	
Indonesia	150	390	283,487,931	1,892,555	730,720	
Denmark	149	390	5,977,413	40,000	15,000	(Note: Does not include Greenland or the Faroe Islands.)
Isle of Man (UK)	148	380	84,161	570	220	
Cyprus	147	380	1,358,282	9,240	3,570	
Northern Cyprus	146	380	489,308	3,355	1,295	(Note: Population is for the end of 2024. Area is stated by academic sources.)
Tonga	145	380	104,176	720	280	
Thailand	140	360	71,668,011	510,890	197,260	
Czech Republic	139	360	10,735,860	77,171	29,796	
Syria	133	340	24,672,760	185,178	71,498	
Cape Verde	130	340	524,877	4,030	1,560	
Jordan	130	340	11,552,876	88,794	34,284	
Benin	128	330	14,462,724	112,760	43,540	
Poland	126	330	37,600,280	306,090	118,180	
Azerbaijan	125	320	10,336,578	82,650	31,910	
France	122	320	66,548,531	547,557	211,413	(Note: Includes metropolitan France only.)
Sierra Leone	120	310	8,642,023	72,180	27,870	
Egypt	117	300	116,538,258	995,450	384,350	
Ethiopia	117	300	132,059,768	1,128,571	435,744	
Slovakia	115	300	5,506,760	48,080	18,560	
Portugal	114	300	10,425,293	91,606	35,369	
Turkey	114	300	87,473,805	769,630	297,160	
Austria	111	290	9,120,813	82,520	31,860	
Malaysia	108	280	35,557,674	328,550	126,850	
Iraq	106	270	46,042,015	434,128	167,618	
Hungary	106	270	9,676,135	91,260	35,240	
Slovenia	105	270	2,118,697	20,136	7,775	
Armenia	104	270	2,973,841	28,470	10,990	
Albania	102	260	2,791,765	27,400	10,600	
Costa Rica	100	260	5,129,910	51,060	19,710	
Ivory Coast	100	260	31,934,230	318,000	123,000	
Cambodia	100	260	17,638,801	176,520	68,150	
Kenya	99	260	56,432,945	569,140	219,750	
Honduras	97	250	10,825,704	111,890	43,200	
Northern Mariana Islands (US)	96	250	44,278	460	180	
Senegal	96	250	18,501,985	192,530	74,340	
Spain	98	250	49,801,559	499,714	192,941	
Timor-Leste	94	240	1,400,638	14,870	5,740	
Moldova	92	240	3,034,961	32,890	12,700	
Cuba	89	230	9,748,532	109,820	42,400	
Dominica	88	230	66,205	750	290	
Transnistria	88	230	367,000	4,163	1,607	(Note: Data from BBC News.)
Brunei	88	230	462,722	5,270	2,030	
Burkina Faso	86	220	23,548,781	273,600	105,600	
Serbia	85	220	6,567,783	88,499	34,170	(Note: Population figure is official and does not include Kosovo. Area figure includes Kosovo. Area without Kosovo is 77,589 square kilometres (29,957 sq mi).)
Myanmar	84	220	54,500,091	652,670	252,000	
Romania	83	210	19,015,088	230,080	88,830	
Uzbekistan	83	210	36,361,859	440,652	170,137	
French Polynesia (France)	81	210	281,807	3,471	1,340	
Wallis and Futuna (France)	81	210	11,278	140	54	
Tunisia	79	200	12,277,109	155,360	59,980	
Samoa	78	200	218,020	2,780	1,070	
Guinea-Bissau	78	200	2,201,352	28,120	10,860	
Greece	78	200	10,047,817	128,900	49,800	
Tanzania	77	200	68,560,157	885,800	342,000	
Lesotho	77	200	2,337,423	30,360	11,720	
Yemen	77	200	40,583,165	527,970	203,850	
Tajikistan	76	200	10,590,928	138,790	53,590	
Ireland	76	200	5,255,018	68,890	26,600	
Ecuador	73	190	18,135,478	248,360	95,890	
North Macedonia	72	190	1,823,009	25,220	9,740	
Eswatini	72	190	1,242,822	17,200	6,600	
Akrotiri and Dhekelia (UK)	72	190	18,195	254	98	(Note: Data from CIA.)
Croatia	69	180	3,875,325	55,960	21,610	
Equatorial Guinea	67	170	1,892,517	28,050	10,830	
Mexico	67	170	130,861,007	1,943,950	750,560	
Afghanistan	65	170	42,647,492	652,230	251,830	
Ukraine	65	170	37,860,222	579,400	223,700	
Bulgaria	62	160	6,757,689	108,560	41,920	
Bosnia and Herzegovina	62	160	3,164,253	51,200	19,800	
Cameroon	62	160	29,123,744	472,710	182,510	
Panama	61	160	4,515,577	74,180	28,640	
Norfolk Island (Australia)	61	160	2,188	36	14	(Note: Population is from 2021. Area is from CIA.)
Guinea	60	160	14,754,786	245,720	94,870	
Liberia	58	150	5,612,817	96,320	37,190	
Nicaragua	57	150	6,916,140	120,340	46,460	
Cook Islands	57	150	13,729	240	93	
Iran	56	150	91,567,738	1,648,195	636,372	
Madagascar	55	140	31,964,956	581,800	224,600	
Georgia	55	140	3,807,670	69,490	26,830	
South Africa	53	140	64,007,187	1,213,090	468,380	
Morocco	53	140	38,081,173	710,850	274,460	
Fiji	51	130	928,784	18,270	7,050	
Djibouti	50	130	1,168,722	23,180	8,950	
Turks and Caicos Islands (UK)	49	130	46,535	950	370	
DR Congo	48	120	109,276,265	2,267,050	875,310	
Colombia	48	120	52,886,364	1,109,500	428,400	
Montenegro	47	120	638,479	13,450	5,190	
Lithuania	46	120	2,859,110	62,604	24,172	
Belarus	45	120	9,056,696	202,990	78,370	
Mozambique	44	110	34,631,766	786,380	303,620	
Montserrat (UK)	44	110	4,389	100	39	
Cocos (Keeling) Islands (Australia)	43	110	602	14	5.4	(Note: Population is from 2021. Area is official.)
Zimbabwe	43	110	16,634,373	386,850	149,360	
Faroe Islands (Denmark)	40	100	55,400	1,370	530	
Bahamas	40	100	401,283	10,010	3,860	
Palau	38	98	17,696	460	180	
United States	37	96	341,730,701	9,147,590	3,531,900	
Kyrgyzstan	37	96	7,186,009	191,800	74,100	
Somaliland	35	91	4,914,100	167,283	64,588	(Note: Population estimate is from 2024. Area is from BBC News.)
Laos	34	88	7,769,819	230,800	89,100	
Venezuela	32	83	28,405,543	882,050	340,560	
Estonia	32	83	1,360,546	42,730	16,500	
Angola	30	78	37,885,850	1,246,700	481,400	
Somalia	30	78	19,009,151	627,340	242,220	
Latvia	30	78	1,871,872	62,230	24,030	
Solomon Islands	29	75	819,198	27,990	10,810	
Eritrea	29	75	3,535,603	121,041	46,734	
Zambia	29	75	21,314,956	743,390	287,020	
Sudan	27	70	50,448,963	1,868,000	721,000	
Vanuatu	27	70	327,778	12,190	4,710	
Peru	27	70	34,217,848	1,280,000	490,000	
Chile	27	70	19,764,772	743,532	287,079	
Sweden	26	67	10,606,999	407,280	157,250	
Brazil	25	65	211,998,574	8,358,140	3,227,100	
Saint Pierre and Miquelon (France)	24	62	5,628	230	89	
Papua New Guinea	23	60	10,576,502	452,860	174,850	
Niger	21	54	27,032,413	1,266,700	489,100	
Bhutan	21	54	791,525	38,140	14,730	
Mali	20	52	24,478,596	1,220,190	471,120	
New Zealand	20	52	5,213,944	263,310	101,660	
Åland (Finland)	20	52	30,237	1,583	611	(Note: Population estimate is from 2023. Land area is from The Nordic Council.)
Algeria	20	52	47,400,000	2,381,741	919,595	
Uruguay	19	49	3,386,588	175,020	67,580	
South Sudan	19	49	11,943,409	631,930	243,990	
Congo	19	49	6,332,961	341,500	131,900	
Finland	18	47	5,617,311	303,948	117,355	
Belize	18	47	417,072	22,810	8,810	
Oman	17	44	5,281,538	309,500	119,500	
Argentina	17	44	45,696,159	2,736,690	1,056,640	
Chad	16	41	20,299,123	1,259,200	486,200	
New Caledonia (France)	16	41	292,640	18,280	7,060	
Turkmenistan	16	41	7,494,499	469,930	181,440	
Saudi Arabia	16	41	33,962,757	2,149,690	830,000	
Paraguay	15	39	6,109,903	406,752	157,048	(Note: Data from Paraguay’s 2022 national census.)
Norway	15	39	5,576,660	364,270	140,650	
South Ossetia	14	36	56,520	3,900	1,500	(Note: Data from BBC News.)
Saint Helena, Ascension and Tristan da Cunha (UK)	13	34	5,238	390	150	
Christmas Island (Australia)	13	34	1,692	136	53	(Note: Population is from 2021. Area is official.)
Bolivia	11	28	12,413,315	1,083,300	418,300	
Gabon	9.9	26	2,538,952	257,670	99,490	
Russia	8.6	22	147,182,123	17,125,191	6,612,073	
Central African Republic	8.6	22	5,330,690	622,980	240,530	
Kazakhstan	7.6	20	20,592,571	2,699,700	1,042,400	
Niue	7.0	18	1,819	260	100	
Mauritania	5.0	13	5,169,396	1,030,700	398,000	
Canada	4.5	12	39,742,430	9,984,670	3,855,100	
Botswana	4.4	11	2,521,139	566,730	218,820	
Guyana	4.2	11	831,087	196,850	76,000	
Libya	4.2	11	7,381,023	1,759,540	679,360	
Suriname	4.0	10	634,431	160,508	61,972	
Iceland	3.9	10	393,396	100,830	38,930	
Namibia	3.7	9.6	3,030,131	823,290	317,870	
Australia	3.5	9.1	26,713,205	7,692,020	2,969,910	
Mongolia	2.2	5.7	3,475,540	1,557,507	601,357	
Western Sahara	2.2	5.7	590,506	266,000	103,000	
Pitcairn Islands (UK)	0.85	2.2	40	47	18	(Note: Pitcairn's tourist site gives an undated figure of exactly 40 as of 2023, while its official government site states the number is "around fifty".)
Falkland Islands (UK)	0.29	0.75	3,471	12,170	4,700	
Greenland (Denmark)	0.026	0.067	55,840	2,166,086	836,330	
Antarctica	0.009	0.023	1,300 (winter) 5,100 (summer)	14,200,000	5,500,000	
South Georgia and the South Sandwich Islands (UK)	0.008	0.021	30	3,756	1,450	

== See also ==
- List of countries by arable land density
- List of countries and dependencies by area
- List of countries and dependencies by population
- List of sovereign states
- List of cities proper by population density
- List of metropolitan areas by population density
- Urban density
