= Population density =

Measurement of population size per unit area or unit volume

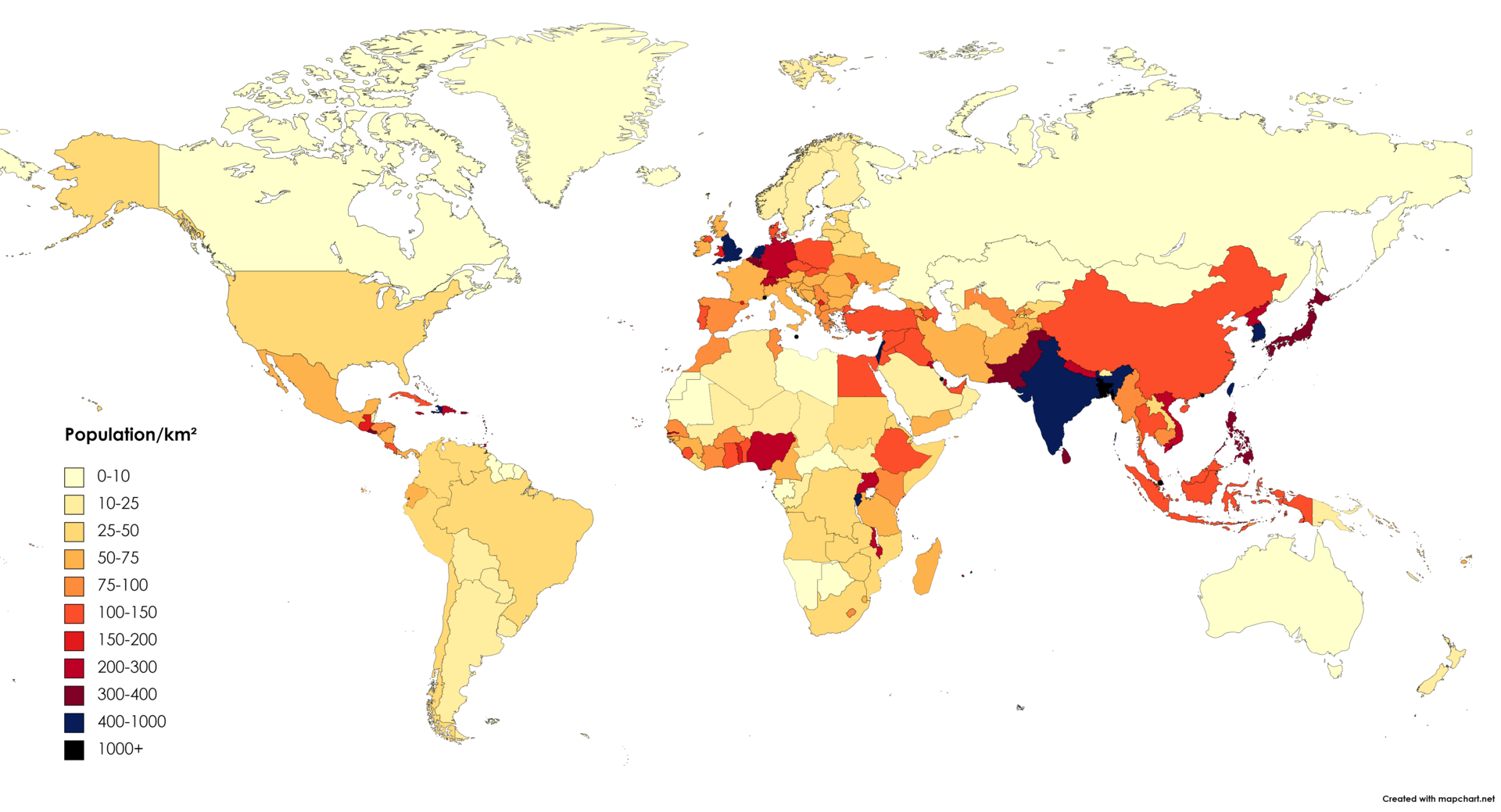
Population density (people per square kilometre) by country in 2023

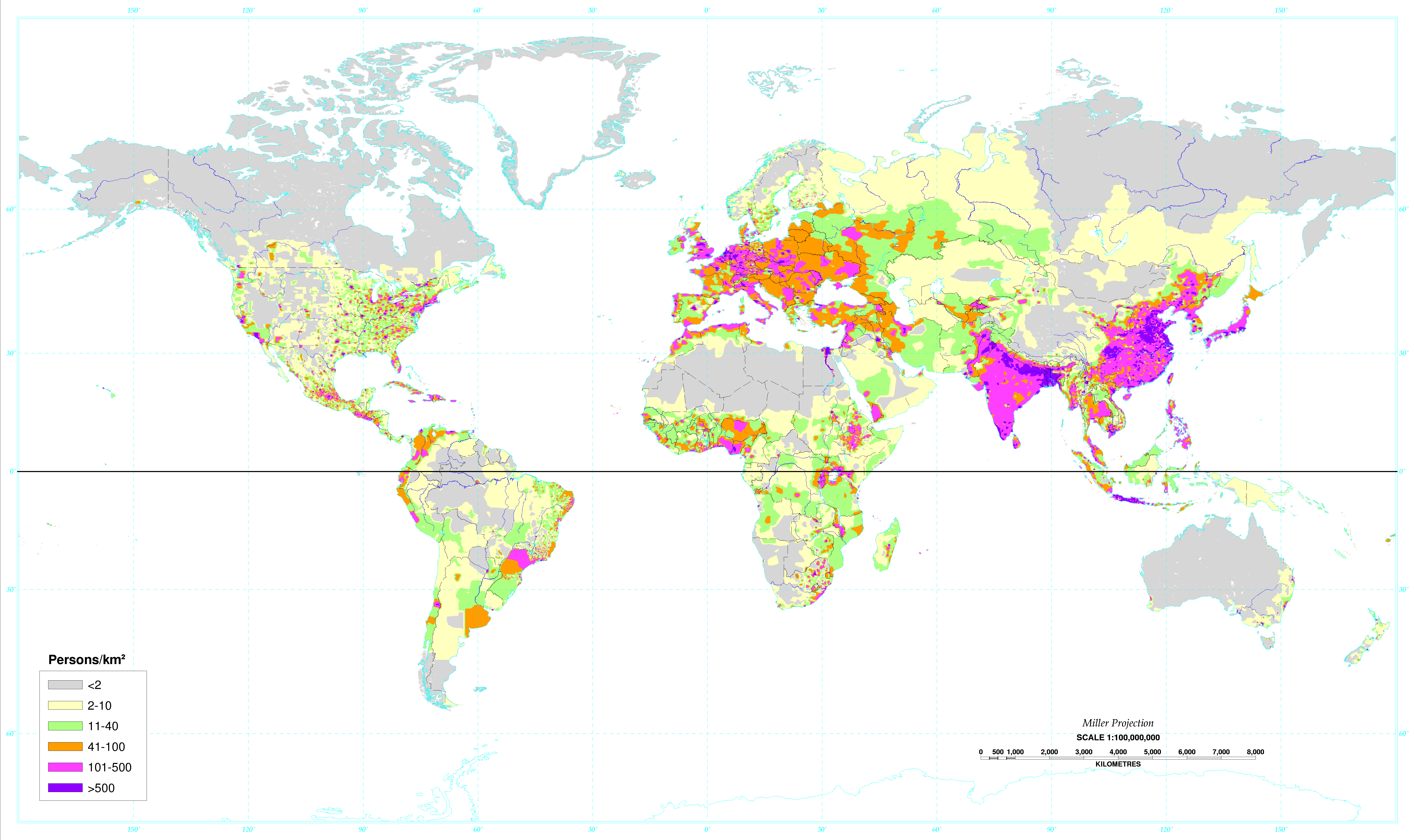
Population density (people per square kilometre) map of the world in 1994. In relation to the equator it is seen that the vast majority of human population lives in the Northern Hemisphere, where 67% of Earth's land area is.

Population density is a measurement of population size per unit land area. It is mostly applied to humans, but sometimes to other living organisms too. It is a key concept in population geography. In botany and agronomy, it is known as plant density.

== Biological population densities ==
Population density is population divided by total land area, sometimes including seas and oceans, as appropriate.

Low densities may cause an extinction vortex and further reduce fertility. This is named the Allee effect after the scientist who identified it. Examples of the causes of reduced fertility in low population densities are:

- Increased problems with locating sexual mates
- Increased inbreeding

=== Human densities ===
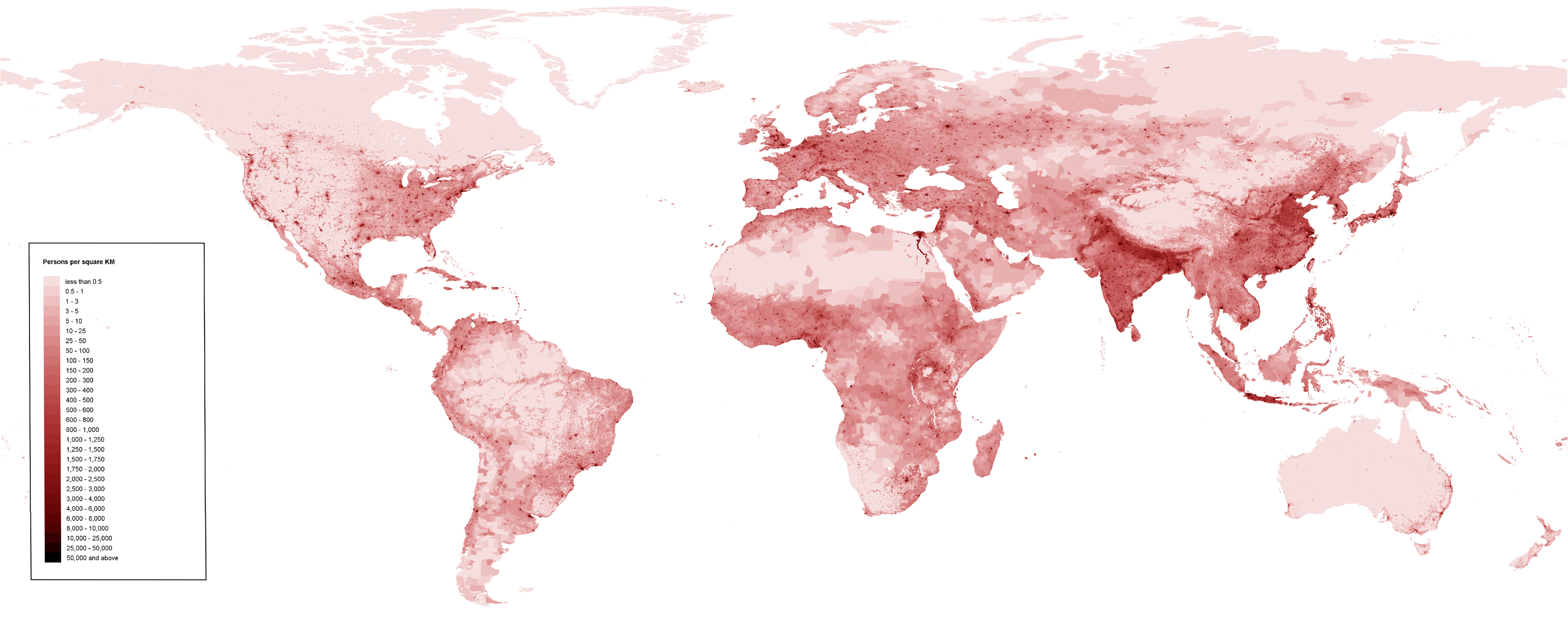
Population density (people per square kilometre) map of the world in 2020

Population density is the number of people per unit of area, usually transcribed as "per square kilometre" or square mile, and which may include or exclude, for example, areas of water or glaciers. Commonly this is calculated for a county, city, country, another territory or the entire world.

World population is around 8,000,000,000 and the Earth's total area (including land and water) is 510,000,000 km^{2} (200,000,000 sq mi). Therefore, the worldwide human population density is approximately 8,000,000,000 ÷ 510,000,000 = 16/km^{2} (41/sq mi). However, if only the Earth's land area of 150,000,000 km^{2} (58,000,000 sq mi) is taken into account, then human population density is 53/km^{2} (140/sq mi). This includes all continental and island land area, including Antarctica. However, if Antarctica is excluded, then population density rises to over 58 per square kilometre (150/sq mi).

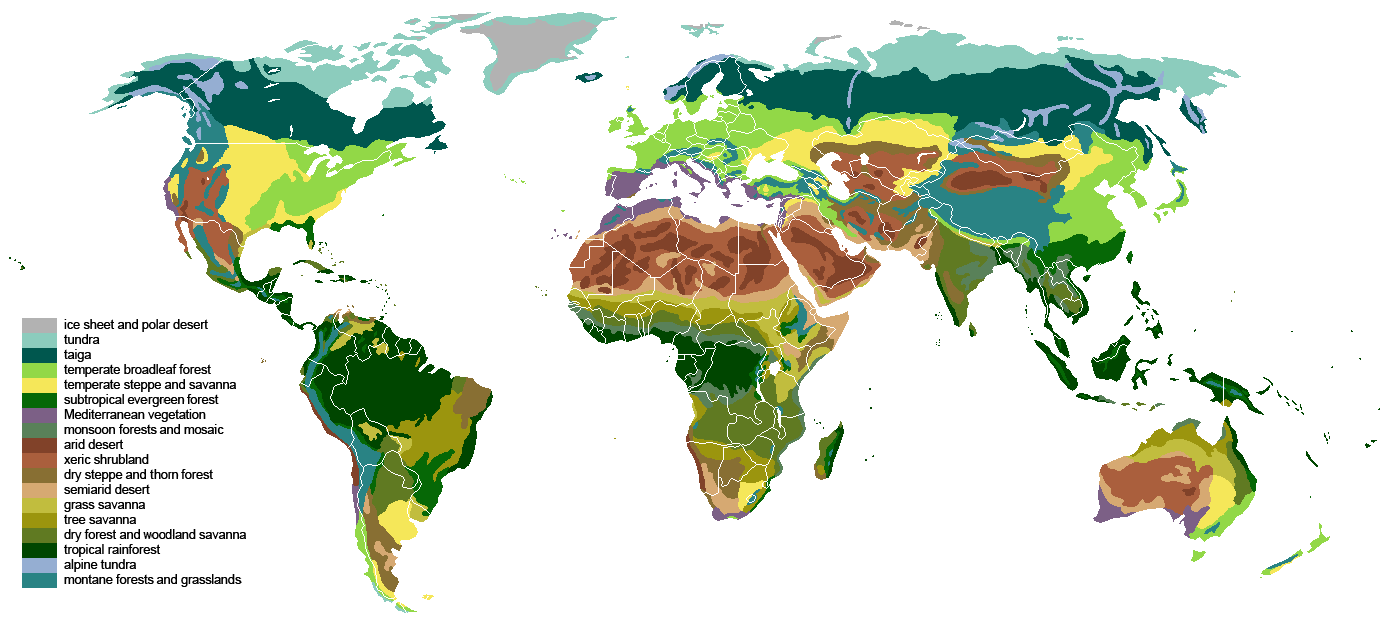
World environments map provided for comparison with maps above

The European Commission's Joint Research Centre (JRC) has developed a suite of (open and free) data and tools named the Global Human Settlement Layer (GHSL) to improve the science for policy support to the European Commission Directorate Generals and Services and as support to the United Nations system.

Several of the most densely populated territories in the world are city-states, microstates and urban dependencies. (Note: The Monaco government uses a smaller surface area figure resulting in a population density of 18,078/km^{2} (46,820/sq mi).) In fact, 95% of the world's population is concentrated on just 10% of the world's land. These territories have a relatively small area and a high urbanization level, with an economically specialized city population drawing also on rural resources outside the area, illustrating the difference between high population density and overpopulation.

Deserts have very limited potential for growing crops as there is not enough rain to support them. Thus, their population density is generally low. However, some cities in the Middle East, such as Dubai, Abu Dhabi and Kuwait City, have been increasing in population and infrastructure growth at a fast pace.

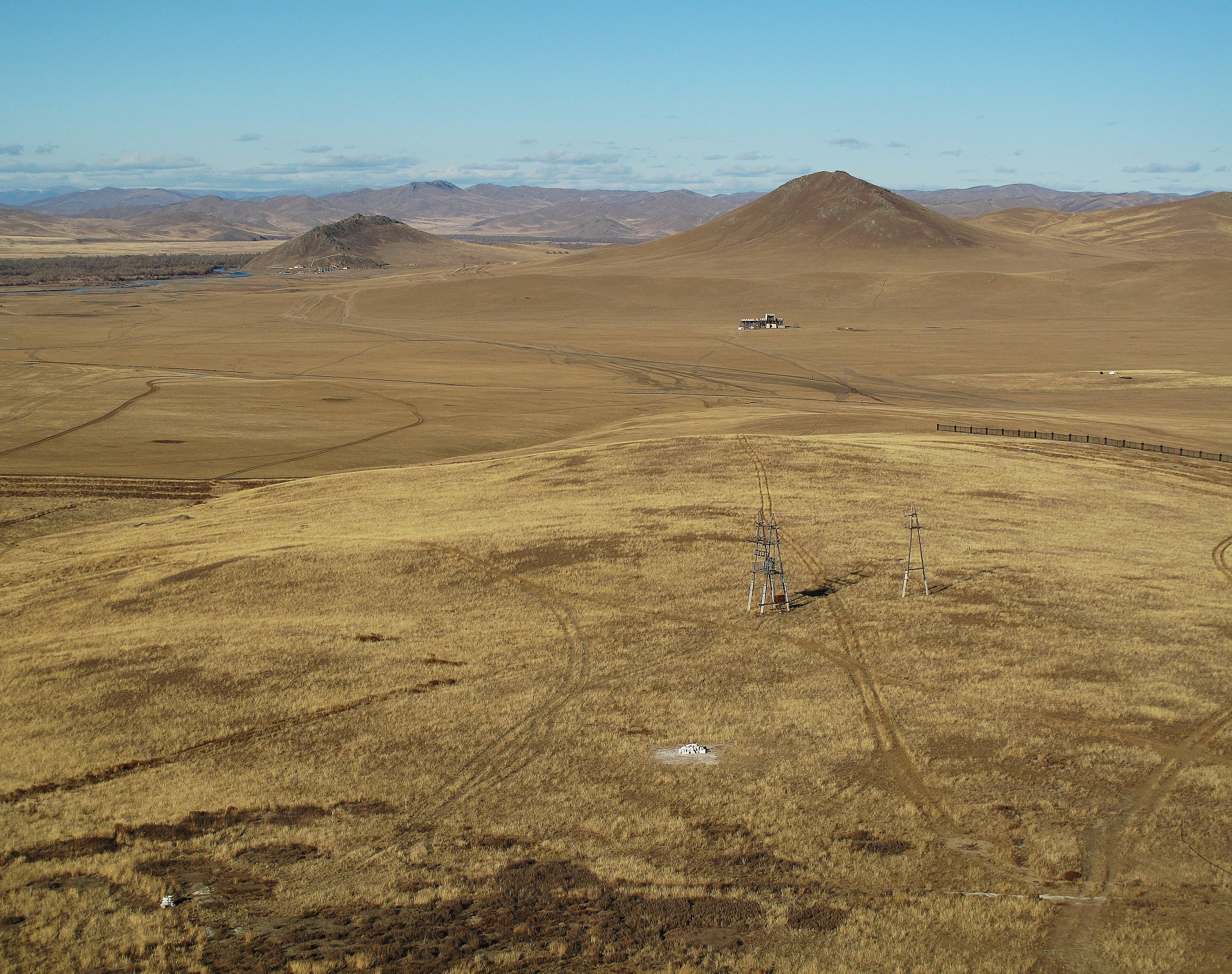
Mongolian Steppes. Mongolia is the least densely populated country in the world due to its harsh climate as a result of its geography.

Cities with high population densities are, by some, considered to be overpopulated, though this will depend on factors like quality of housing and infrastructure and access to resources. Very densely populated cities are mostly in Asia (particularly Southeast Asia); Africa's Lagos, Kinshasa, and Cairo; South America's Bogotá, Lima, and São Paulo; and Mexico City and Saint Petersburg also fall into this category.

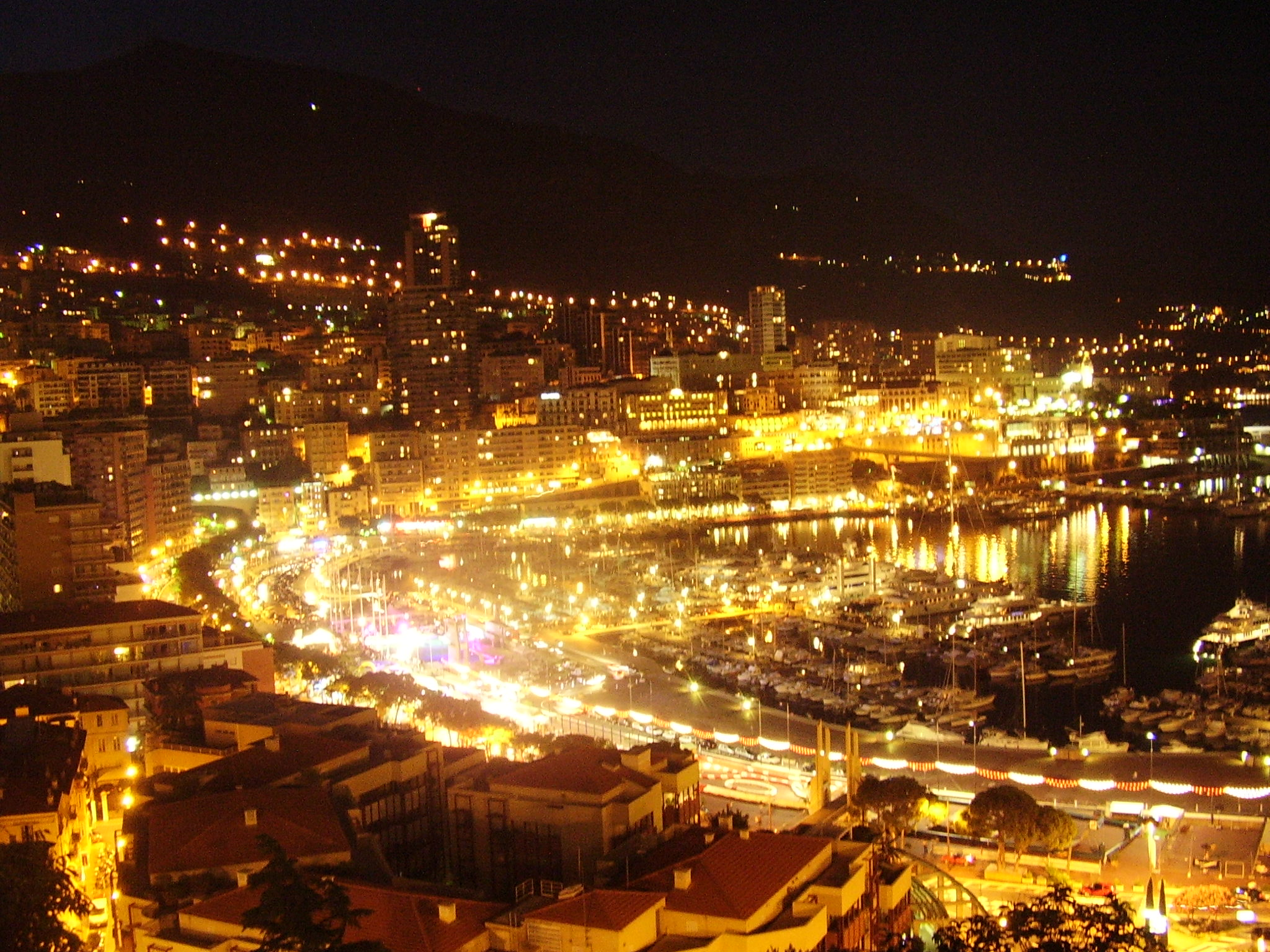
Monaco is currently the most densely populated nation in Europe.

City population and especially area are, however, heavily dependent on the definition of "urban area" used: densities are almost invariably higher for the center only than when suburban settlements and intervening rural areas are included, as in the agglomeration or metropolitan area (the latter sometimes including neighboring cities).

In comparison, based on a world population of 8 billion, the world's inhabitants, if conceptualized as a loose crowd occupying just under 1 m^{2} (10 sq ft) per person (cf. Jacobs Method), would occupy an area of 8,000 square kilometres (3,100 sq mi) a little less than the land area of Puerto Rico, 8,868 square kilometres (3,424 sq mi).

=== Countries and dependent territories ===
Population under 10,000,000
Rank	Country or dependent territory	Land Area		Population	Density	
Rank	Country or dependent territory	km^{2}	sq mi	Population	per km^{2}	per sq mi
1	Macau (China)	30.5	12	650,834	21,339	55,268
2	Monaco	2.02	0.78	37,550	18,589	48,145
3	Singapore	735.7	284	6,036,900	8,206	21,253
4	Hong Kong (China)	1,106.3	427	7,409,800	6,698	17,348
5	Gaza Strip (Palestine) (Note: Territory occupied by Israel.)	365	141	2,098,389	5,749	14,890
6	Gibraltar (UK) (Note: Territory claimed by Spain.)	6.8	2.6	33,140	4,874	12,624
7	Bahrain	757	292	1,451,200	1,917	4,965
8	Vatican City	0.44	0.17	800	1,818	4,709
9	Malta	315	122	475,701	1,510	3,911
10	Maldives	298	115	378,114	1,269	3,287

Population above 10,000,000
Rank	Country/Territory	Land Area		Population	Density	
Rank	Country/Territory	km^{2}	sq mi	Population	per km^{2}	per sq mi
1	Bangladesh	134,208	51,818	170,329,768	1,269	3,287
2	Taiwan	32,260	12,456	23,539,588	730	1,891
3	Rwanda	24,668	9,524	13,246,394	537	1,391
4	Netherlands	33,670	13,000	17,943,243	533	1,380
5	South Korea	99,909	38,575	51,439,038	515	1,334
6	Burundi	25,680	9,915	12,574,571	490	1,269
7	India	2,973,190	1,147,955	1,374,547,140	462	1,197
8	Haiti	27,560	10,641	11,743,017	426	1,103
9	Belgium	30,278	11,690	11,554,449	382	989
10	Philippines	298,170	115,124	109,961,895	369	956

=== Other methods of measurement ===
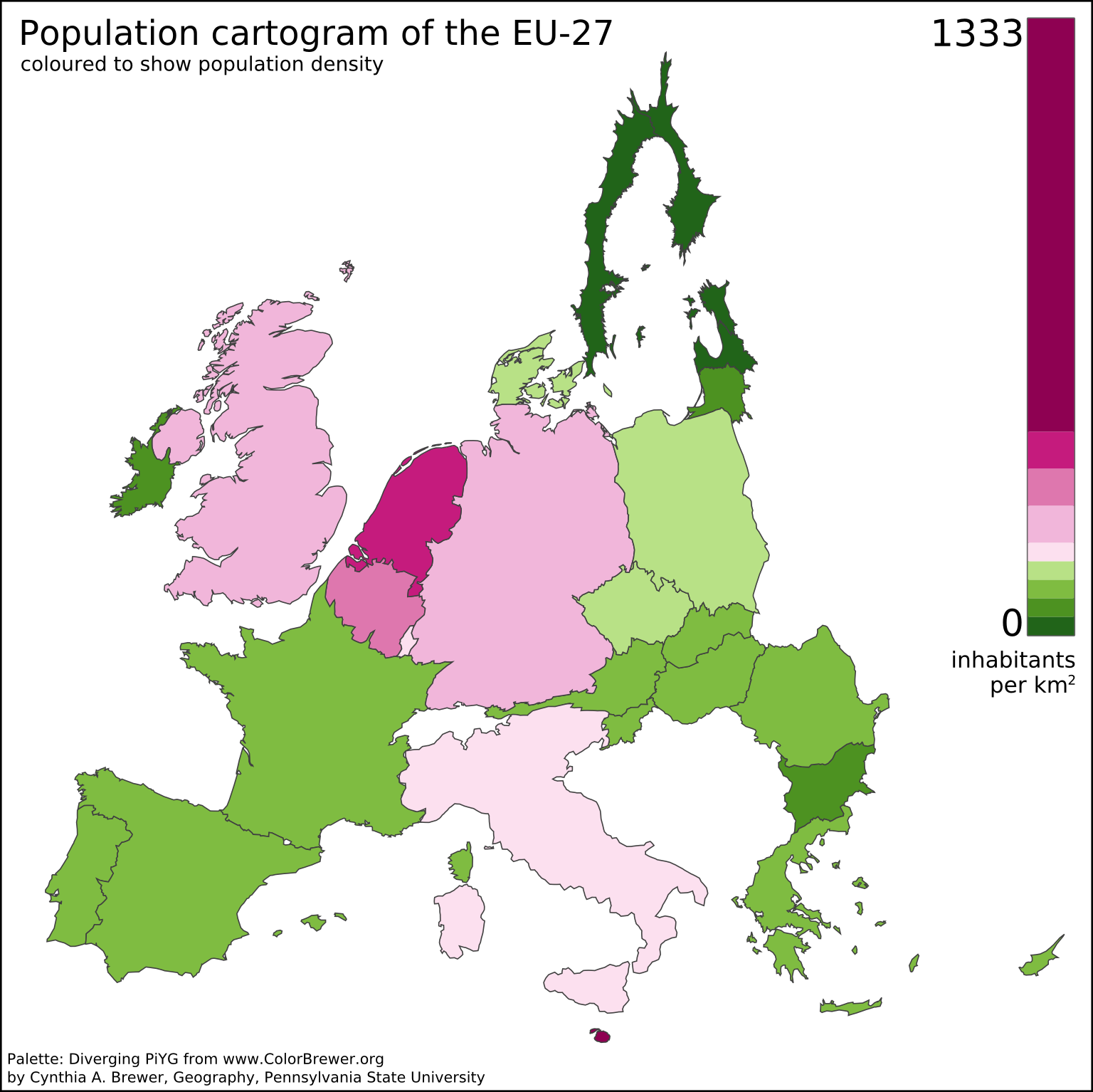
This population cartogram of the European Union (2007–2012) uses areas and colors to represent population.

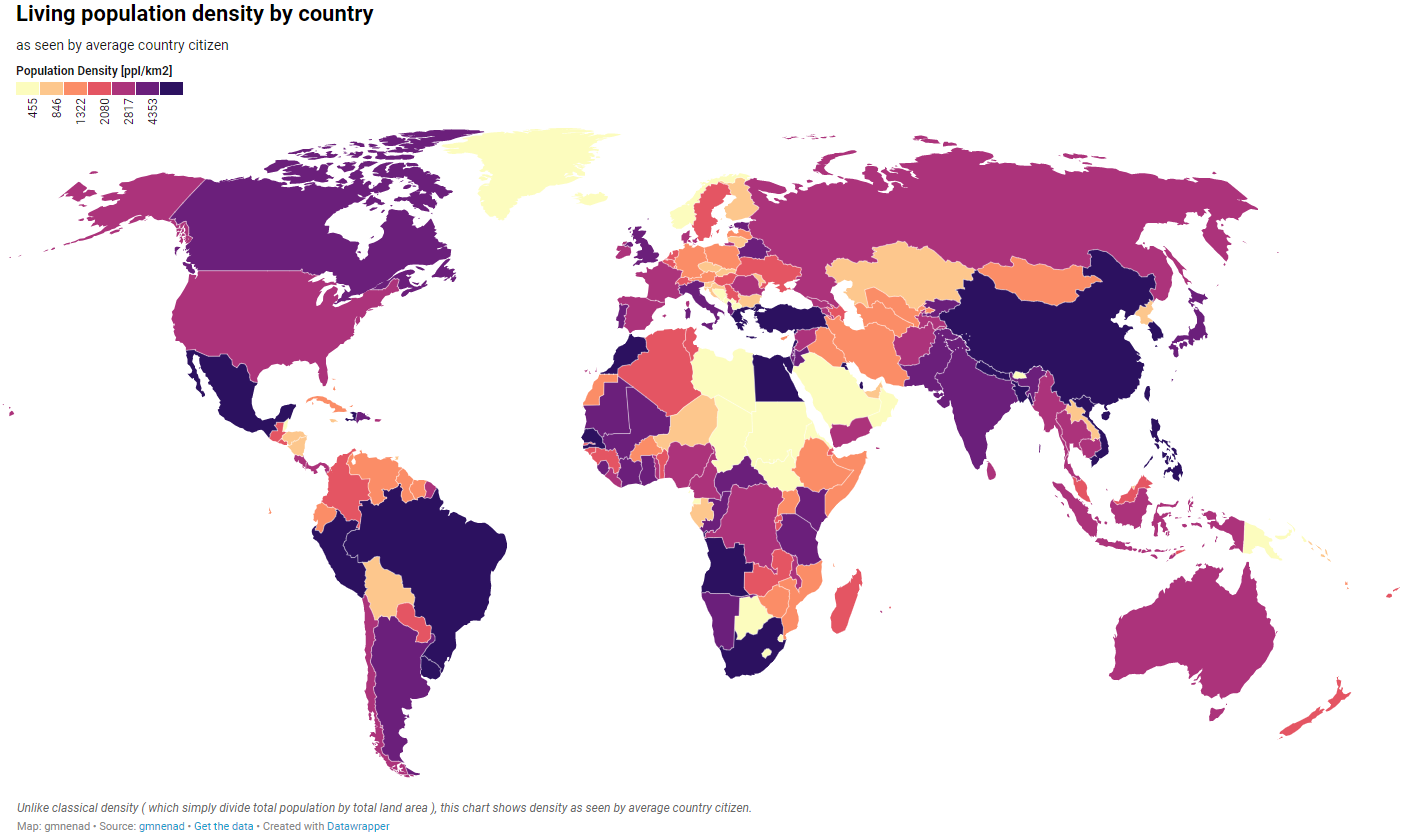
Living population density by country

Although the arithmetic density is the most common way of measuring population density, several other methods have been developed to provide alternative measures of population density over a specific area.

- Arithmetic density: The total number of people / area of land
- Physiological density: The total population / area of arable land
- Agricultural density: The total rural population / area of arable land
- Residential density: The number of people living in an urban area / area of residential land
- Urban density: The number of people inhabiting an urban area / total area of urban land
- Ecological optimum: The density of population that can be supported by the natural resources
- Population weighted density: Also known as living density, population density at which the average person lives

== See also ==
- Distance sampling
- Demography
- Human geography
- Idealised population
- List of population concern organizations
- Population dynamics
- Population decline
- Population growth
- Population genetics
- Population health
- Population momentum
- Population pyramid
- Rural transport problem
- Significant figures
- Small population size

=== Lists of entities by population density ===
- List of Australian suburbs by population density
- List of countries by population density
- List of cities by population density
- List of city districts by population density
- List of English districts by population density
- List of European Union cities proper by population density
- List of islands by population density
- List of states and territories of the United States by population density
