= List of cities proper by population density =

This is a list of cities worldwide by population density. The population, population density and land area for the cities listed are based on the entire city proper, the defined boundary or border of a city or the city limits of the city. The population density of the cities listed is based on the average number of people living per square kilometre or per square mile. This list does not refer to the population, population density or land area of the greater metropolitan area or urban area, nor particular districts in any of the cities listed.

== Cities by population density ==
- Note: links for each country go to the relevant list of cities, when available.

City	Population	Area		Density		Country	Year
City	Population	km^{2}	mi^{2}	/km^{2}	/mi^{2}	Country	Year
Giza	4,432,915	98	38	45,050	116,679	Egypt	2025
Manila	1,902,590	42	16	44,936	116,384	Philippines	2024
Croix-des-Bouquets	231,077	5	2	42,322	109,614	Haiti	2024
Mandaluyong	465,902	11	4	42,125	109,104	Philippines	2024
Port-au-Prince	988,438	25	10	39,084	101,228	Haiti	2024
Dhaka	10,295,786	305	118	33,757	87,430	Bangladesh	2022
Bnei Brak	229,996	7	3	32,449	84,042	Israel	2024
Pasay	453,186	14	5	32,440	84,020	Philippines	2024
Caloocan	1,712,945	53	21	32,198	83,393	Philippines	2024
Kolkata	6,200,000	206	80	30,097	77,952	India	2023 2023
Levallois-Perret	68,412	2	1	28,387	73,522	France	2022
Taguig	1,308,085	48	18	27,320	70,759	Philippines	2024
Pasig	853,050	31	12	27,115	70,229	Philippines	2024
Neapoli, Thessaloniki	25,822	1	0	27,039	70,030	Greece	2021
Guédiawaye	373,638	14	5	26,688	69,123	Senegal	2023
Bogotá	8,034,649	307	119	26,141	67,705	Colombia	2020s
Vincennes	49,891	2	1	26,121	67,653	France	2020
Le Pré-Saint-Gervais	17,950	1	0	25,643	66,415	France	2020
Malabon	389,929	16	6	24,820	64,285	Philippines	2024
Saint-Mandé	22,619	1	0	24,586	63,677	France	2020
Saint-Josse-ten-Noode	27,548	1	0	24,165	62,587	Belgium	
Guttenberg	12,017	1	0	24,034	62,248	United States	2020
San Juan, Metro Manila	134,312	6	2	22,881	59,262	Philippines	2024
Montrouge	46,324	2	1	22,379	57,961	France	2023
Damascus	1,711,000	77	30	22,221	57,552	Syria	
Navotas	252,878	12	4	21,970	56,903	Philippines	2024
Asmara	963,000	45	17	21,400	55,426	Eritrea	2012
Mislata	43,756	2	1	21,241	55,014	Spain	
Marikina	471,323	23	9	20,818	53,919	Philippines	2024
Paris	2,187,526	105	41	20,755	53,754	France	2020
Union City	68,589	3	1	20,690	53,588	United States	2020
Mumbai	12,442,373	603	233	20,634	53,442	India	2013 2019
Macau	681,293	33	13	20,620	53,406	China	2021
Nea Smyrni	72,853	4	1	20,615	53,393	Greece	2021
Colombo	752,993	37	14	20,351	52,710	Sri Lanka	
L'Hospitalet de Llobregat	252,171	12	5	20,336	52,671	Spain	2016
West New York	52,912	3	1	20,288	52,547	United States	2020
Saint-Gilles	50,002	3	1	19,842	51,391	Belgium	
Clichy	61,070	3	1	19,828	51,354	France	2020
Kotsiubynske	17,249	1	0	19,826	51,351	Ukraine	
Courbevoie	81,719	4	2	19,597	50,756	France	2020
Kallithea	97,616	5	2	19,473	50,434	Greece	2021
Boulogne-Billancourt	120,071	6	2	19,460	50,403	France	2020
Las Piñas	615,549	32	12	19,224	49,790	Philippines	2024
Giv'atayim	62,242	3	1	19,210	49,755	Israel	2024
Malé	211,908	11	4	18,887	48,916	Maldives	2022
General Mariano Alvarez	176,927	9	4	18,822	48,749	Philippines	2024
Koekelberg	21,990	1	0	18,795	48,679	Belgium	
Quezon City	3,084,270	166	64	18,633	48,259	Philippines	2024
Monaco	38,367	2	1	18,446	47,774	Monaco	2023
Les Lilas	23,045	1	0	18,290	47,370	France	2020
Hoboken	60,419	3	1	18,226	47,205	United States	2020
Pikine	758,554	42	16	18,061	46,778	Senegal	2023
Modi'in Illit	86,158	5	2	17,838	46,201	Israel	2024
Vanves	27,729	2	1	17,775	46,037	France	2020
Asnières-sur-Seine	85,191	5	2	17,674	45,777	France	2020
Ciudad Nezahualcóyotl	1,110,565	63	24	17,503	45,334	Mexico	2010
Kathmandu	862,400	49	19	17,440	45,169	Nepal	2021
Sliema	22,591	1	1	17,378	45,008	Malta	2019
Howrah	1,077,075	63	24	17,096	44,280	India	
Santa Coloma de Gramenet	118,821	7	3	16,974	43,964	Spain	2019
Chittagong	2,582,401	155	60	16,661	43,151	Bangladesh	2018
Molenbeek-Saint-Jean	97,462	6	2	16,547	42,857	Belgium	
Freetown	1,347,559	81	31	16,539	42,835	Sierra Leone	2024
Keur Massar	759,849	46	18	16,518	42,783	Senegal	2023
Seoul	9,962,393	605	234	16,461	42,634	South Korea	2013
Charenton-le-Pont	30,374	2	1	16,418	42,524	France	2020
La Garenne-Colombes	29,169	2	1	16,387	42,443	France	2020
Schaerbeek	133,309	8	3	16,377	42,417	Belgium	
Neuilly-sur-Seine	60,361	4	1	16,183	41,913	France	2020
Barcelona	1,636,732	101	39	16,149	41,827	Spain	2021
Issy-les-Moulineaux	68,451	4	2	16,106	41,715	France	2020
Jakarta	10,562,088	662	255	15,967	41,354	Indonesia	2020
Bat-Yam	129,584	8	3	15,842	41,030	Israel	2019
Gentilly	18,605	1	0	15,767	40,836	France	2020
Cairo	9,539,673	606	234	15,742	40,772	Egypt	2019
Buenos Aires	3,120,612	203	78	15,372	39,815	Argentina	2022
Bandung	2,510,103	167	64	15,031	38,929	Indonesia	2020
Rosario, Cavite	112,572	8	3	14,793	38,313	Philippines	2024
San Pedro, Laguna	348,968	24	9	14,510	37,581	Philippines	2024
Mandaue	364,482	25	10	14,475	37,490	Philippines	2024
Warabi	73,777	5	2	14,438	37,394	Japan	2023
El'ad	50,289	4	1	14,368	37,214	Israel	2024
Bacoor	661,381	46	18	14,325	37,102	Philippines	2024
Beitar Illit	67,618	5	2	14,296	37,026	Israel	2024
Makati	309,770	22	8	14,255	36,922	Philippines	2024
Senglea	2,820	0	0	14,100	36,519	Malta	2013
Cimahi	568,400	40	16	14,080	36,467	Indonesia	2020
Muntinlupa	552,225	40	15	13,892	35,981	Philippines	2024
Biñan	584,479	44	17	13,436	34,800	Philippines	2024
Bangui	889,438	67	26	13,218	34,235	Central African Republic	2024
Lagos	15,388,000	1,171	452	13,138	34,027	Nigeria	2024
Gaza City	590,481	45	17	13,122	33,985	Palestine	2017
Kiryat Motzkin	49,400	4	1	13,103	33,938	Israel	2024
Geneva	201,818	16	6	12,677	32,833	Switzerland	2020
Bekasi	2,543,676	210	81	12,085	31,299	Indonesia	2020
Portici	53,801	5	2	11,903	30,828	Italy	2019
Tehran	8,737,510	750	290	11,650	30,174	Iran	2016
Tangerang	1,895,486	165	64	11,519	29,835	Indonesia	2020
Yogyakarta	373,589	33	13	11,495	29,772	Indonesia	2020

== Gallery ==
Notable City aerial view
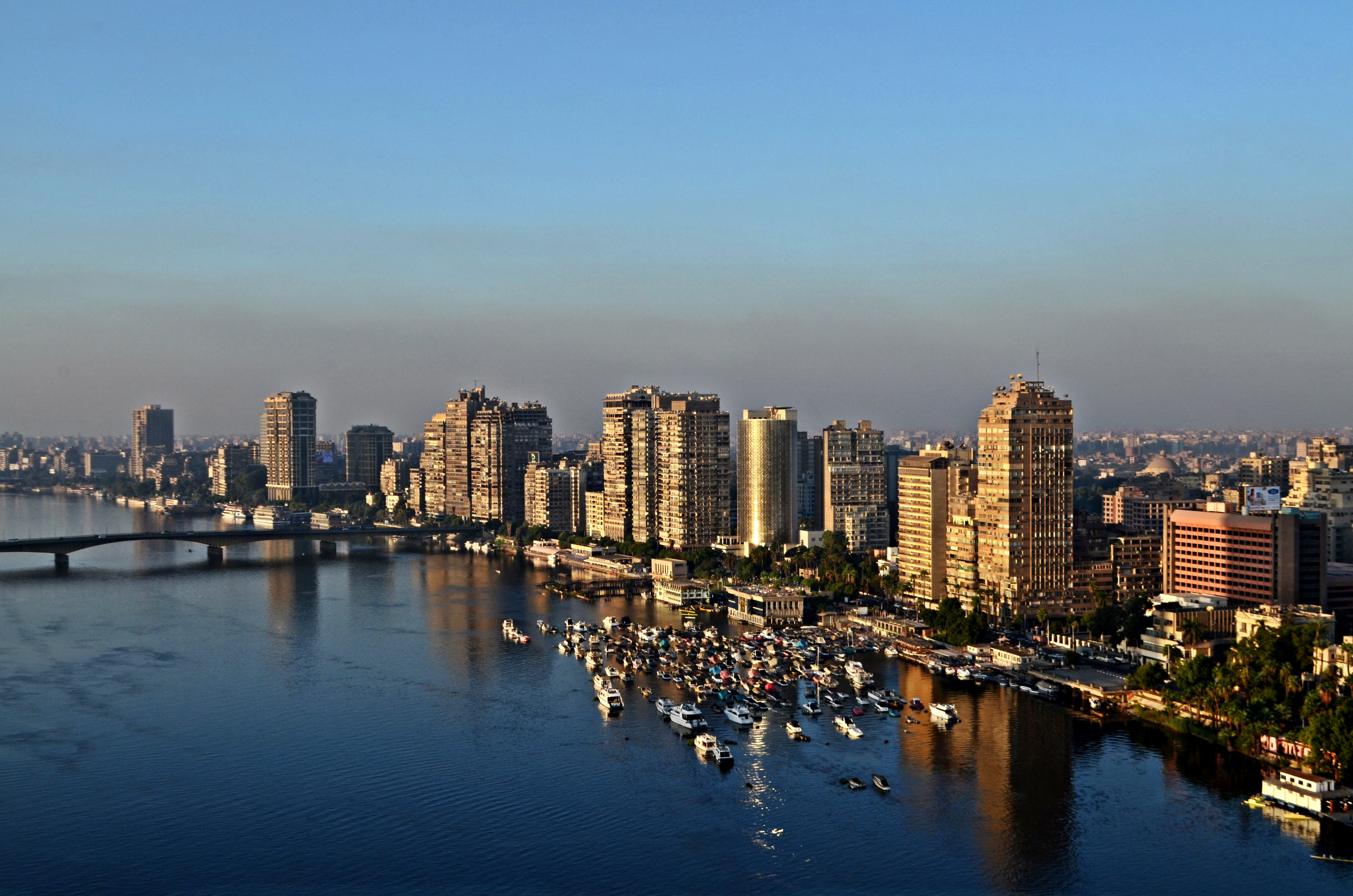
Giza, Egypt

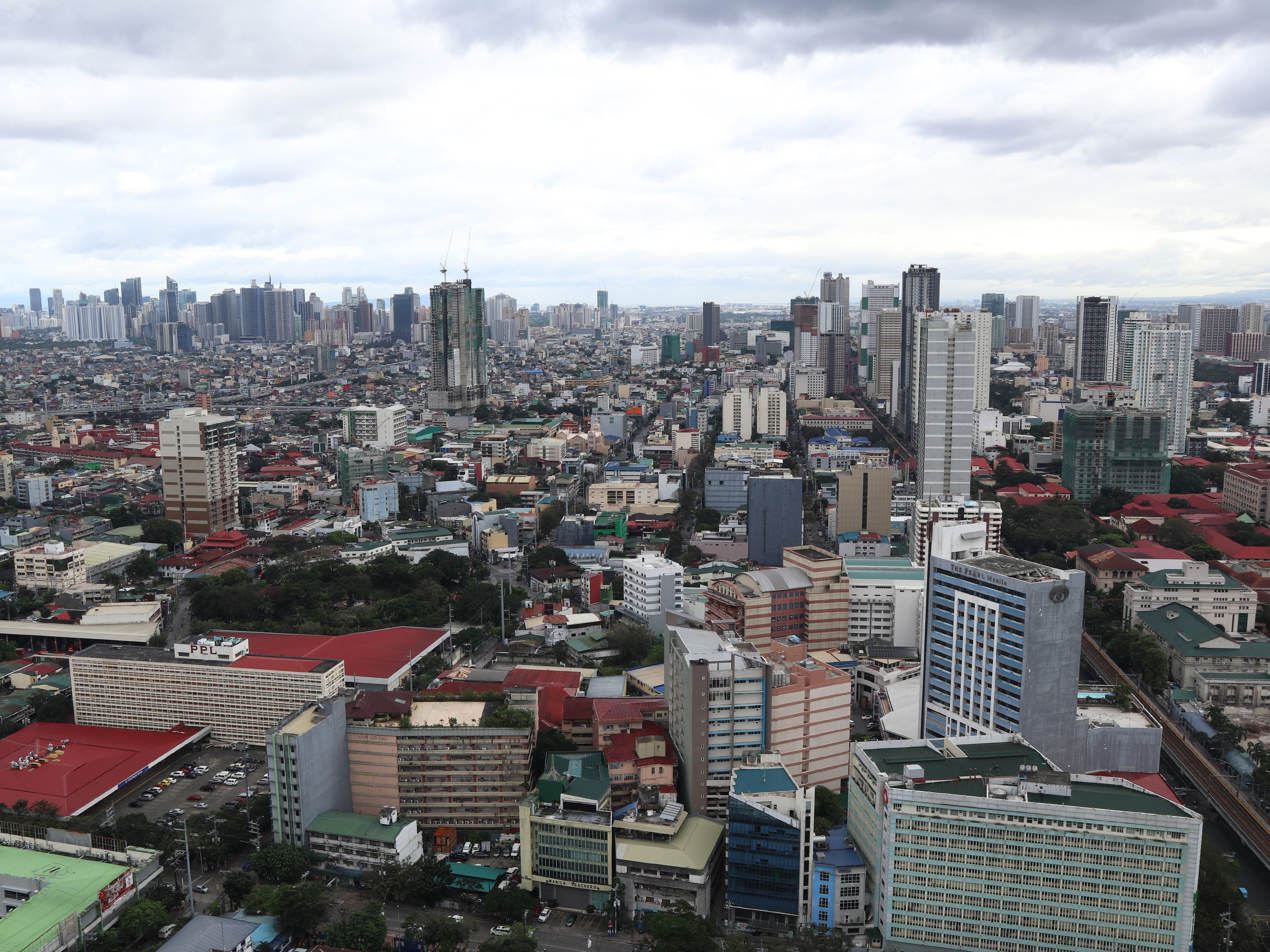
Manila, Philippines

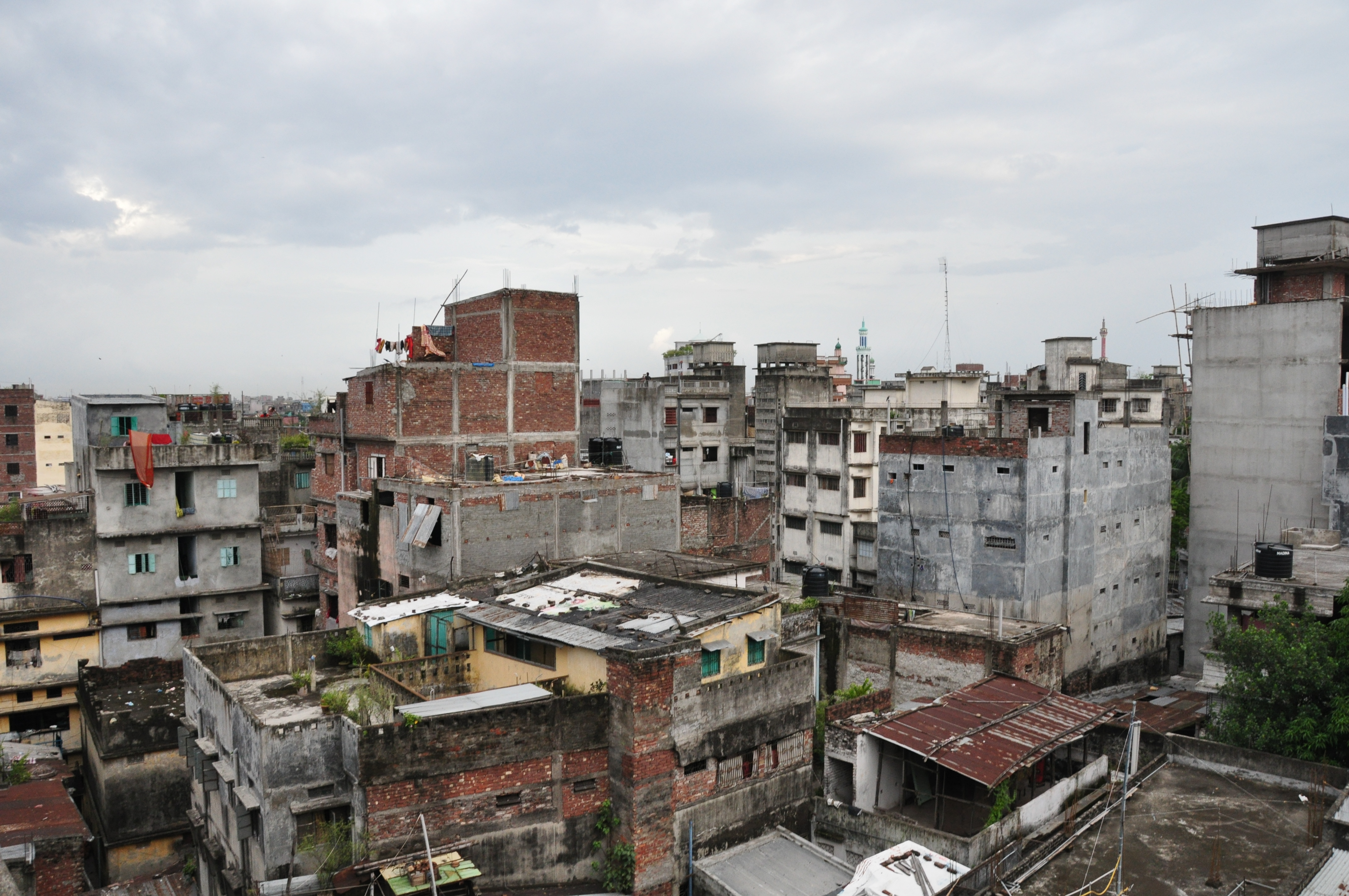
Dhaka, Bangladesh

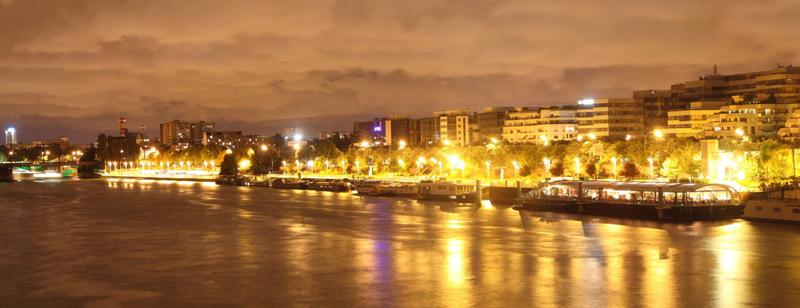
Levallois-Perret, France

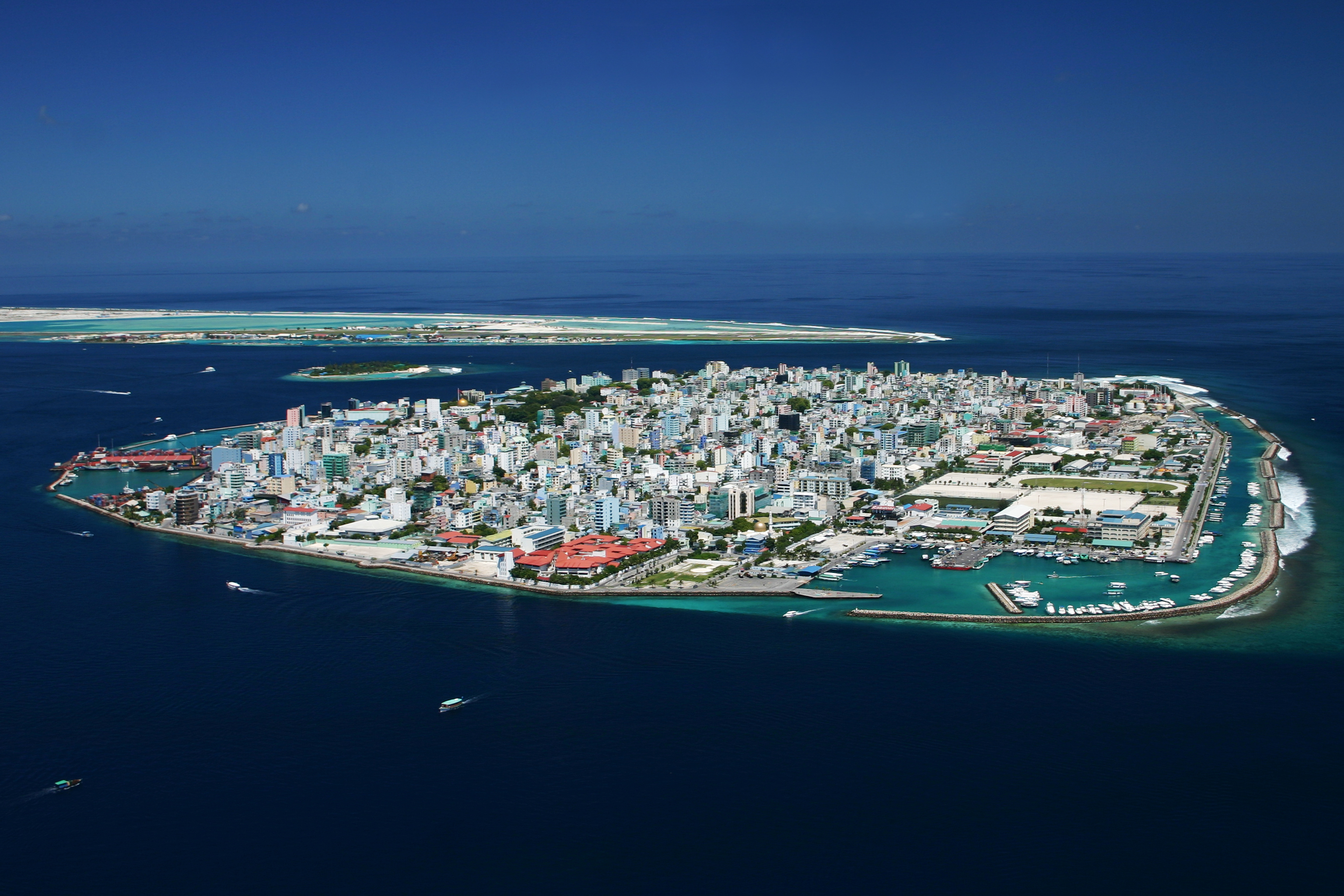
Malé, Maldives

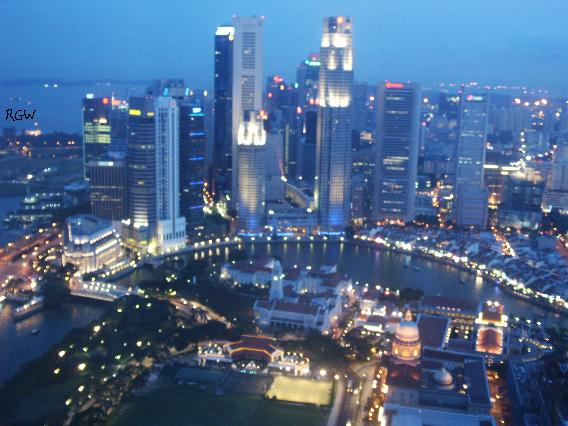
Singapore

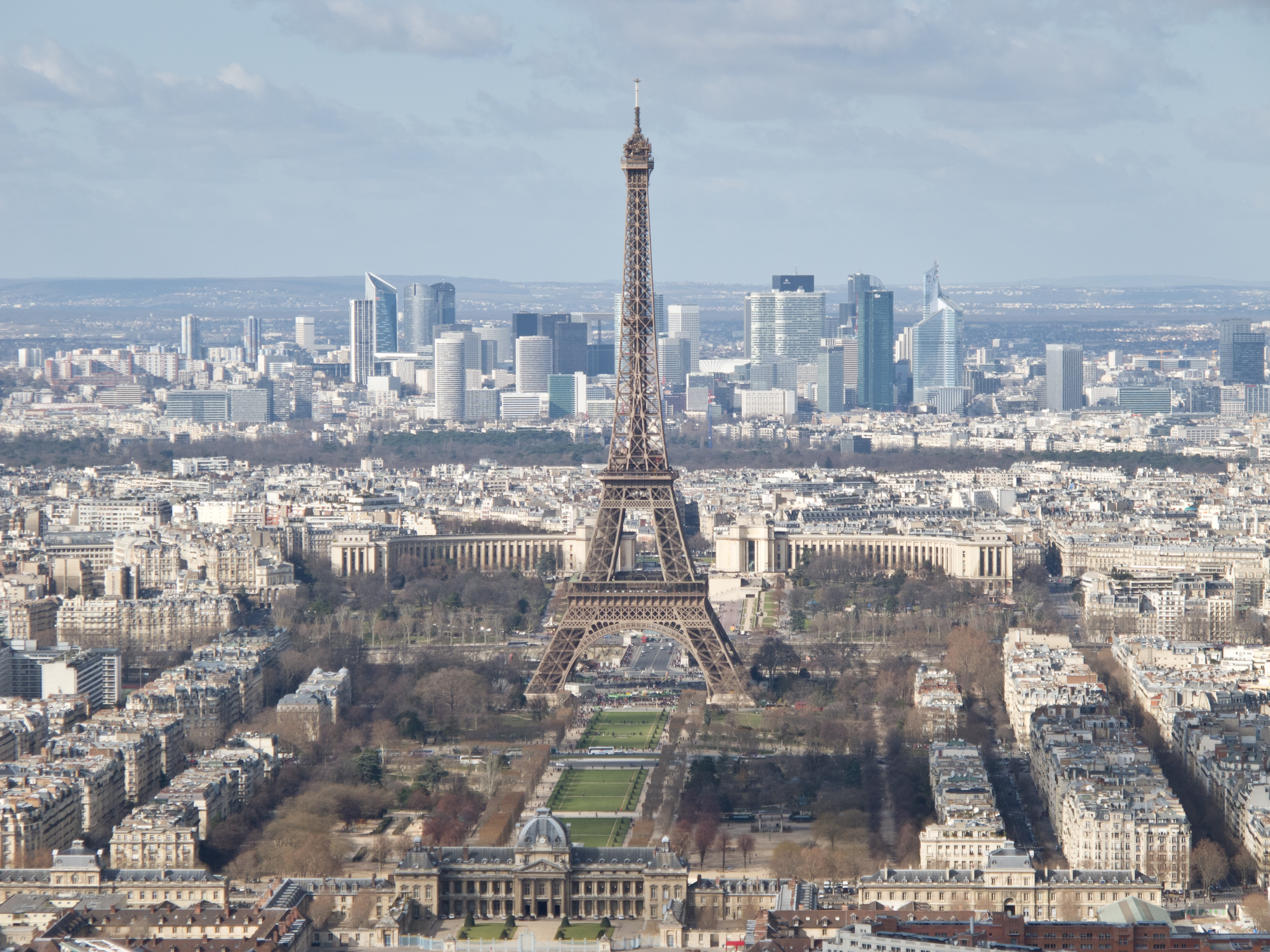
Paris, France

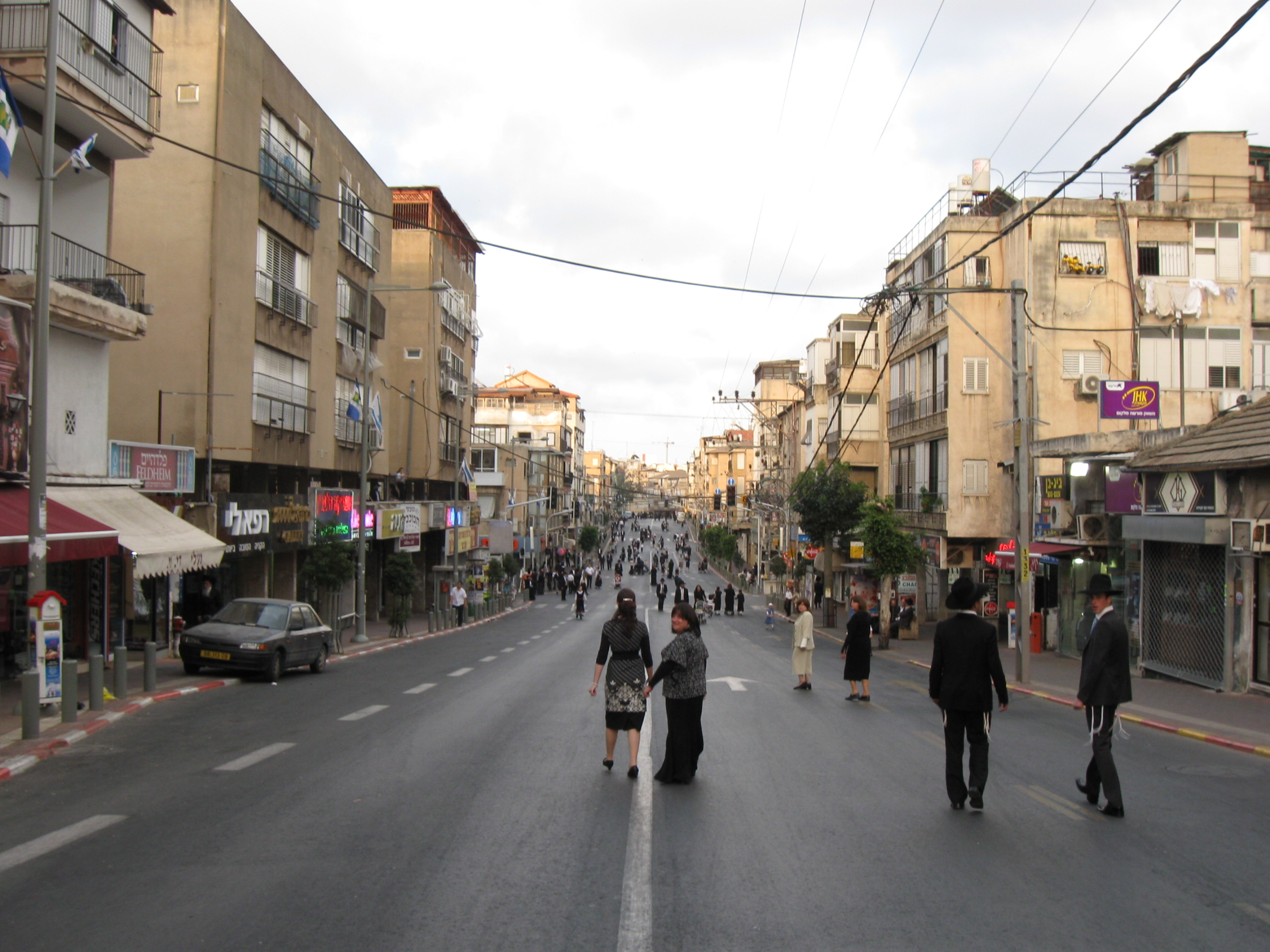
Bnei Brak, Israel

== See also ==
- List of largest cities
- List of metropolitan areas by population density
- List of city districts by population density
- List of countries and dependencies by population density
- List of European Union cities proper by population density
- List of United States cities by population density
