= Physiological density =

Population density metric

Physiological density, also known as real population density, is defined as the number of people per unit area of arable land. It provides a measure of the pressure that a population places on the land available for agriculture.

Higher physiological density indicates that the available arable land supports more people, which can increase the risk of reaching the land's productive capacity sooner than in regions with lower physiological density. In countries with limited arable land relative to their population, such as Egypt, physiological density is substantially higher than arithmetic density, reflecting concentrated population pressure on fertile areas.

== See also ==
- Population density
- List of countries by arable land density
