= List of European Union cities proper by population density =

The population, population density, and land area for the cities of the European Union listed below are based on the entire city proper, the defined boundary or border of a city or the city limits of the city.

Rank	City	Population	Area (km^{2})	Area (sq. miles)	Density (/km^{2})	Density (/sq. mile)	Country
1	Levallois-Perret	66,082	2.41	0.93	27,420	71,056	France
2	Emperador	692	0.03	0.01	23,067	69,200	Spain
3	L'Hospitalet de Llobregat	264,923	12.4	4.8	21,364	55,599	Spain
4	Paris	2,203,817	105.4	40.5	20,909	54,415	France
5	Mislata	43,278	2.10	0.81	20,608	53,430	Spain
6	Benetússer	14,668	0.76	0.29	19,300	50,579	Spain
7	Athens	745,514	38.96	15.04	19,135	49,560	Greece
8	Sliema	22,591	1.3	0.50	17,377	45,182	Malta
9	Thessaloniki	325,182	19.31	7.45	16,840	43,648	Greece
10	Barcelona	1,621,537	101.9	39.3	15,991	41,417	Spain
11	Korydallos	63,445	4.32	1.67	14,686	37,991	Greece
12	Senglea	2,784	0.2	0.077	13,920	36,062	Malta
13	Nikaia	89,380	6.65	2.57	13,441	34,778	Greece
14	Odivelas	59,604	5.02	2.04	11,873	30,589	Portugal
15	Casavatore	18,225	1.54	0.63	11,818	28,928	Italy
16	Portici	51,901	4.56	1.75	11,393	29,658	Italy
17	Lyon	500,715	47.87	18.48	10,460	27,095	France
18	Melito di Napoli	36,334	3.57	2.23	10,172	16,293	Italy
19	Cádiz	116,979	12.10	4.67	9,700	25,000	Spain
20	San Giorgio a Cremano	42,096	4.71	1.59	8,938	26,475	Italy
21	Piraeus	448,997	50.42	19.47	8,906	23,061	Greece
22	Grenoble	158,240	18.13	7.00	8,700	23,000	France
23	Bilbao	353,187	40.65	15.70	8,688	22,496	Spain
24	Bucharest	1,926,334	228	88.03	8,449	21,883	Romania
25	Naples	913,704	116.72	45.28	7,828	20,178	Italy
26	Agualva-Cacém	81,020	10.42	3.9	7,775	19,874	Portugal
27	Milan	1,371,499	181.64	70.18	7,551	19,474	Italy
28	Brussels	1,212,352	162.4	62.3	7,465	19,460	Belgium
29	Bresso	26,282	3.54	2.21	7,415	11,838	Italy
30	Fuengirola	75,396	10.2	3.9	7,400	19,000	Spain
31	Porto	287,591	41.42	15.99	6,900	18,000	Portugal
32	The Hague	568,945	82.45	31.83	6,900	17,872	Netherlands
33	Turin	851,199	130.11	50.26	6,542	16,936	Italy
34	A Coruña	246,056	37.83	14.61	6,510	16,841	Spain
35	Lisbon	505,526	100.05	39	6,446	16,696	Portugal
36	Leiden	130,638	21.91	8.46	5,962	15,443	Netherlands
37	Valencia	780,834	134.65	51.99	5,799	15,019	Spain
38	Haarlem	168,743	29.17	11.26	5,785	14,983	Netherlands
39	Amsterdam	934,526	165.5	63.9	5,647	14,625	Netherlands
40	Madrid	3,141,991	604.3	233.3	5,390	14,000	Spain
41	Bordeaux	250,776	49.36	19.06	5,081	13,160	France
42	Seville	703,021	140	54.05	5,022	13,007	Spain
43	Stockholm	942,370	188	73	5,012	12,909	Sweden
44	Delft	110,173	22.65	8.75	4,864	12,598	Netherlands
45	Montpellier	275,318	56.88	21.96	4,840	12,536	France
46	Nice	343,895	71.92	27.77	4,782	12,385	France
47	Munich	1,471,508	310.70	119.96	4,736	12,267	Germany
48	Dublin	554,554	117.80	45.48	4,708	12,193	Ireland
49	Vienna	1,889,083	414.65	160.10	4,556	11,800	Austria
50	Copenhagen	671,673	92.4	35.68	7,269	18,825	Denmark
51	Ottobrunn	21,542	5.23	2.02	4,119	10,664	Germany
52	Malmö	316,588	77.0605	29.75	4,108	10,642	Sweden
53	Berlin	3,644,826	891.12	344.06	4,090	10,594	Germany
54	Toulouse	479,638	118.30	45.68	4,054	10,450	France
55	Linköping	166,673	42.16	16.28	4,000	10,000	Sweden
56	Palermo	630,427	160.15	62.00	3,936	10,168	Italy
57	Świętochłowice	50,012	13.31	5.14	3,757	9,732	Poland
58	Uppsala	177,074	48.77	18.83	3,600	9,400	Sweden
59	Lund	94,393	26.37	10.18	3,580	9,300	Sweden
60	Saint-Nicolas	24,251	6.89	2.66	3,518	9,117	Belgium
61	Pescara	118,461	34.39	13.27	3,445	9,000	Italy
62	Warsaw	1,777,972	517.24	199.71	3,421	8,860	Poland
63	Mortsel	25,824	7.70	2.97	3,355	8,695	Belgium
64	Plovdiv	346,893	101.98	39.37	3,349	8,674	Bulgaria
65	Budapest	1,752,286	525.14	202.76	3,337	8,642	Hungary
66	Chorzów	108,434	33.24	12.83	3,262	8,449	Poland
67	Gröbenzell	19,967	6.36	2.46	3,139	8,117	Germany
68	Helsinki	665,558	213.75	82.53	3,113	8,064	Finland
69	Stuttgart	634,830	207.33	80.05	3,062	7,930	Germany
70	Herne	156,374	51.42	19.85	3,041	7,878	Germany
71	Frankfurt am Main	753,056	248.31	95.87	3,033	7,855	Germany
72	Tallinn	452,563	159	61.3	2,839	7,383	Estonia
73	Riga	588,911	304	114	2,322	6,015	Latvia
74	Vilnius	617,984	401	155	1,541	3,920	Lithuania
75	Ljubljana	302,826	274.99	106.17	1,101	2,852	Slovenia

== See also ==
- List of cities by population density, worldwide
