= List of metropolitan areas by population density =

This is a list of metropolitan areas by population density covering the top 100 most densely populated metropolitan areas worldwide.

City	Population	Area		Density		Country
City	Population	km^{2}	mi^{2}	/km^{2}	/mi^{2}	Country
Malé	212,138	1.956	0.755	107,958	280,977	Maldives
Manila	1,780,148	38.55	14.88	43,079	111,576	Philippines
Bogor	866,034	21.56	8.32	40,169	104,037	Indonesia
Kolkata	15,333,000	206	80	27,774	71,935	India
Levallois-Perret	66,082	2.41	0.93	27,420	71,017	France
Mandaluyong	305,576	11.26	4.35	27,138	70,288	Philippines
Neapoli	30,279	1.17	0.45	25,879	67,027	Greece
Caloocan	1,378,856	53.34	20.6	25,850	66,952	Philippines
Karachi	23,382,881	3,527	1,362	6,630	17,168	Pakistan
Chennai	4,616,639	181.04	69.9	25,501	66,047	India
Sukabumi	300,694	12.15	4.69	24,748	64,099	Indonesia
Hyderabad	4,068,611	172.70	66.68	23,559	61,017	India
Saint-Josse-ten-Noode	26,488	1.14	0.44	23,235	60,179	Belgium
Malabon	363,681	15.76	6.08	23,076	59,767	Philippines
Kallithea	109,609	4.75	1.83	23,076	59,767	Greece
Mumbai	13,830,884	603.0	232.8	22,937	59,406	India
Jaigaon	38,689	1.69	0.65	22,893	59,293	India
Navotas	245,344	10.77	4.16	22,780	59,001	Philippines
Ampelokipoi	40,959	1.80	0.69	22,755	58,935	Greece
Hospitalet de Llobregat	265,444	12.40	4.787	21,407	55,451	Spain
Pasay	403,064	19.00	7.34	21,214	54,944	Philippines
Nea Smyrni	73,986	3.52	1.36	21,019	54,439	Greece
Bogotá	7,862,677	379.9	146.6	20,691	53,630	Colombia
Paris	2,165,423	105.4	40.5	20,545	53,211	France
Dhaka	7,000,940	360.0	138.99	19,447	50,368	Bangladesh
Ahmedabad	3,959,432	204	78.8	19,408	50,269	India
Athens	745,514	38.96	15.04	19,135	49,560	Greece
Union City	62,715	3.29	1.27	19,066	49,381	United States
Saint-Gilles	46,931	2.52	0.97	18,623	48,234	Belgium
Macau	542,200	29.2	11.3	18,568	48,092	China
Prayagraj	1,142,722	63.38	24.47	18,030	46,697	India
Sylhet	463,198	26.5	10.23	17,479	45,278	Bangladesh
Patna	1,875,572	108.34	41.83	17,311	44,837	India
Seoul	10,464,051	605.25	233.68	17,288	44,778	South Korea

== See also ==
- List of cities proper by population density
