= List of countries by arable land density =

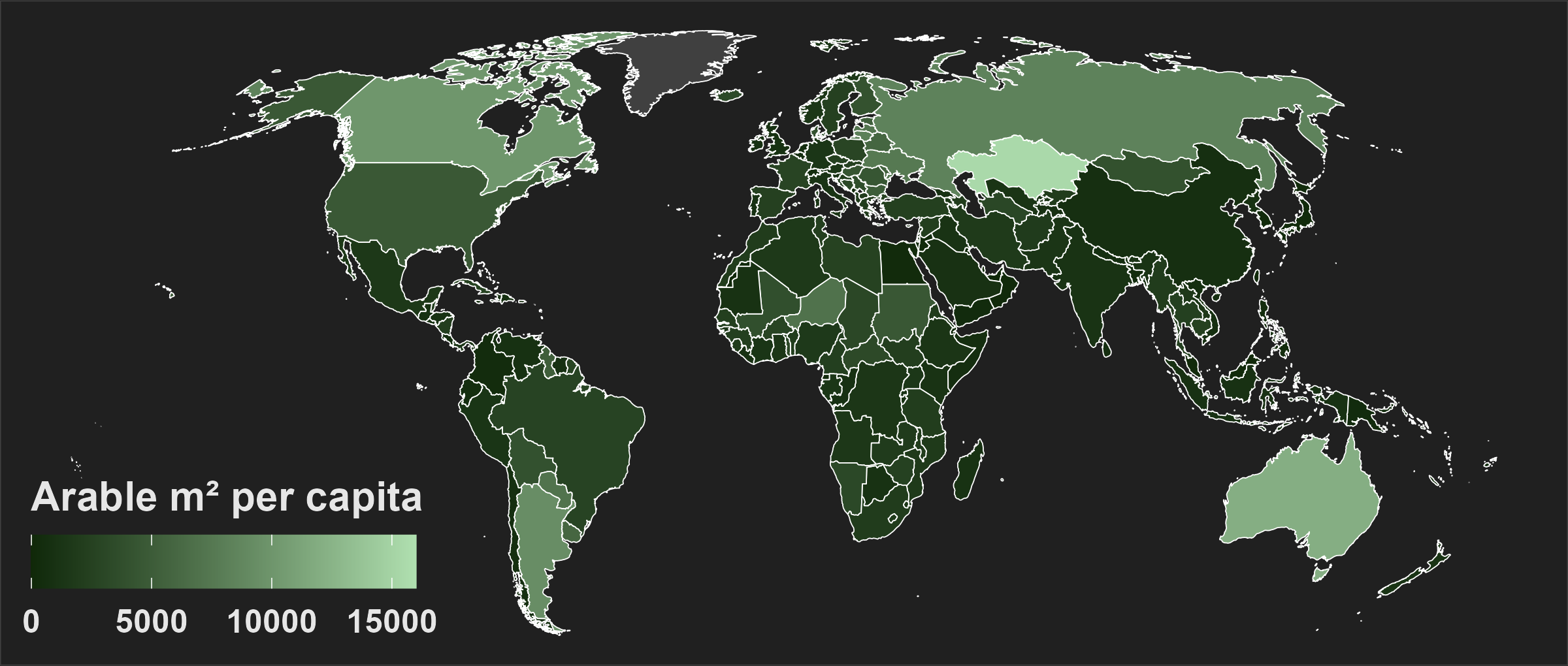
Arable density (m² per capita) by country

This is a list of countries ordered by physiological density. "Arable land" is defined by the UN's Food and Agriculture Organization, the source of "Arable land (hectares per person)" as land under temporary crops (double-cropped areas are counted once), temporary meadows for mowing or for pasture, land under market or kitchen gardens, and land temporarily fallow. Land abandoned as a result of shifting cultivation is excluded.

== List ==
Data are for the year 2021, and are from the UN FAO unless otherwise specified. Locations with no arable land are omitted.

Location	Arable land / person		Persons / arable area		% arable	Arable land		Population
Location	m^{2}	sq ft	km^{2}	sq mi	% arable	km^{2}	sq mi	Population
World	1,800	19,000	570	1,500	11%	14,000,000	5,400,000	7,900,000,000
Kazakhstan	15,456	166,370	65	170	11%	296,697	114,555	19,196,465
Australia	12,062	129,830	83	210	4%	312,650	120,710	25,921,089
Canada	10,027	107,930	100	260	4%	382,590	147,720	38,155,012
Argentina	9,322	100,340	107	280	15%	422,088	162,969	45,276,780
Russia	8,384	90,240	119	310	7%	1,216,490	469,690	145,102,755
Lithuania	8,178	88,030	122	320	36%	22,790	8,800	2,786,651
Ukraine	7,563	81,410	132	340	57%	329,240	127,120	43,531,422
Saint Helena, Ascension and Tristan da Cunha	7,402	79,670	135	350	10%	40	15	5,404
Latvia	7,268	78,230	138	360	22%	13,620	5,260	1,873,919
Paraguay	7,062	76,010	142	370	12%	47,340	18,280	6,703,799
Niger	7,009	75,440	143	370	14%	177,000	68,000	25,252,722
Uruguay	5,927	63,800	169	440	12%	20,306	7,840	3,426,260
Belarus	5,872	63,210	170	440	28%	56,240	21,710	9,578,167
Moldova	5,589	60,160	179	460	52%	17,110	6,610	3,061,506
Estonia	5,268	56,700	190	490	16%	7,000	2,700	1,328,701
Guyana	5,220	56,200	192	500	2%	4,200	1,600	804,567
Niue	5,163	55,570	194	500	4%	10	3.9	1,937
Bulgaria	5,084	54,720	197	510	32%	35,005	13,516	6,885,868
United States	4,681	50,390	214	550	17%	1,577,368	609,025	336,997,624
Sudan	4,598	49,490	217	560	11%	209,948	81,061	45,657,202
Montserrat	4,528	48,740	221	570	20%	20	7.7	4,417
Romania	4,443	47,820	225	580	37%	85,880	33,160	19,328,560
Hungary	4,263	45,890	235	610	45%	41,397	15,983	9,709,786
Finland	4,052	43,620	247	640	7%	22,430	8,660	5,535,992
Bolivia	4,030	43,400	248	640	4%	48,684	18,797	12,079,472
Denmark	4,026	43,340	248	640	59%	23,570	9,100	5,854,240
Mongolia	3,981	42,850	251	650	0.9%	13,328	5,146	3,347,782
Mali	3,808	40,990	263	680	7%	83,410	32,200	21,904,983
Serbia	3,584	38,580	279	720	31%	26,150	10,100	7,296,769
Saint Pierre and Miquelon	3,400	37,000	294	760	9%	20	7.7	5,883
Central African Republic	3,298	35,500	303	780	3%	18,000	6,900	5,457,154
Iceland	3,267	35,170	306	790	1%	1,210	470	370,335
Namibia	3,162	34,040	316	820	1%	8,000	3,100	2,530,151
Chad	3,085	33,210	324	840	4%	53,000	20,000	17,179,740
Bosnia and Herzegovina	3,082	33,170	324	840	20%	10,080	3,890	3,270,943
Togo	3,065	32,990	326	840	49%	26,500	10,200	8,644,829
Turkmenistan	3,059	32,930	327	850	4%	19,400	7,500	6,341,855
Poland	2,892	31,130	346	900	36%	110,788	42,775	38,307,726
France	2,783	29,960	359	930	33%	179,566	69,331	64,531,444
Burkina Faso	2,760	29,700	362	940	22%	61,000	24,000	22,100,683
Isle of Man	2,753	29,630	363	940	41%	232	90	84,263
Brazil	2,718	29,260	368	950	7%	582,528	224,915	214,326,223
Cuba	2,584	27,810	387	1,000	28%	29,086	11,230	11,256,372
Libya	2,554	27,490	392	1,020	1%	17,200	6,600	6,735,277
Zimbabwe	2,501	26,920	400	1,000	10%	40,000	15,000	15,993,524
Belize	2,500	27,000	400	1,000	4%	1,000	390	400,031
Cambodia	2,484	26,740	403	1,040	23%	41,201	15,908	16,589,023
Slovakia	2,434	26,200	411	1,060	28%	13,260	5,120	5,447,622
Spain	2,432	26,180	411	1,060	23%	115,501	44,595	47,486,935
Sweden	2,422	26,070	413	1,070	6%	25,352	9,788	10,467,097
Thailand	2,395	25,780	417	1,080	34%	171,500	66,200	71,601,103
Czech Republic	2,355	25,350	425	1,100	32%	24,753	9,557	10,510,751
Turkey	2,345	25,240	426	1,100	26%	198,810	76,760	84,775,404
Tunisia	2,309	24,850	433	1,120	18%	28,313	10,932	12,262,946
Guinea	2,291	24,660	437	1,130	13%	31,000	12,000	13,531,906
Cameroon	2,280	24,500	439	1,140	13%	62,000	24,000	27,198,628
Senegal	2,269	24,420	441	1,140	20%	38,300	14,800	16,876,720
South Sudan	2,228	23,980	449	1,160	4%	23,947	9,246	10,748,272
Nicaragua	2,194	23,620	456	1,180	12%	15,030	5,800	6,850,540
Syria	2,186	23,530	458	1,190	25%	46,606	17,995	21,324,367
Benin	2,154	23,190	464	1,200	25%	28,000	11,000	12,996,895
Tanzania	2,123	22,850	471	1,220	15%	135,025	52,133	63,588,334
Croatia	2,111	22,720	474	1,230	15%	8,570	3,310	4,060,135
Albania	2,101	22,610	476	1,230	22%	5,999	2,316	2,854,710
Myanmar	2,043	21,990	490	1,300	17%	109,900	42,400	53,798,084
Greece	2,041	21,970	490	1,300	17%	21,319	8,231	10,445,365
Morocco	2,026	21,810	494	1,280	17%	75,120	29,000	37,076,584
Azerbaijan	2,026	21,810	494	1,280	25%	20,890	8,070	10,312,992
South Africa	2,020	21,700	495	1,280	10%	120,000	46,000	59,392,255
Malawi	2,011	21,650	497	1,290	42%	40,000	15,000	19,889,742
North Macedonia	1,983	21,340	504	1,310	17%	4,170	1,610	2,103,330
Kyrgyzstan	1,972	21,230	507	1,310	7%	12,874	4,971	6,527,743
Zambia	1,951	21,000	512	1,330	5%	38,000	15,000	19,473,125
Eritrea	1,906	20,520	525	1,360	6%	6,900	2,700	3,620,312
Tonga	1,886	20,300	530	1,400	28%	200	77	106,017
Sierra Leone	1,881	20,250	532	1,380	22%	15,840	6,120	8,420,641
Lesotho	1,880	20,200	532	1,380	14%	4,290	1,660	2,281,454
Iran	1,786	19,220	560	1,500	10%	156,990	60,610	87,923,432
Mozambique	1,761	18,960	568	1,470	7%	56,500	21,800	32,077,072
Nigeria	1,728	18,600	579	1,500	40%	368,720	142,360	213,401,323
Algeria	1,705	18,350	587	1,520	3%	75,306	29,076	44,177,969
Gambia	1,667	17,940	600	1,600	43%	4,400	1,700	2,639,916
Laos	1,648	17,740	607	1,570	5%	12,240	4,730	7,425,057
Afghanistan	1,638	17,630	627	1,620	12%	78,360	30,250	49,552,566
Armenia	1,589	17,100	629	1,630	16%	4,434	1,712	2,790,974
Mexico	1,585	17,060	631	1,630	10%	200,840	77,540	126,705,138
Angola	1,557	16,760	642	1,660	4%	53,730	20,750	34,503,774
Uganda	1,505	16,200	665	1,720	34%	69,000	27,000	45,853,778
Norway	1,488	16,020	672	1,740	2%	8,040	3,100	5,403,021
Eswatini	1,485	15,980	674	1,750	10%	1,770	680	1,192,271
Austria	1,479	15,920	676	1,750	16%	13,198	5,096	8,922,082
Guinea-Bissau	1,456	15,670	687	1,780	11%	3,000	1,200	2,060,721
Ghana	1,434	15,440	697	1,810	21%	47,089	18,181	32,833,031
DR Congo	1,427	15,360	701	1,820	6%	136,800	52,800	95,894,118
Germany	1,398	15,050	715	1,850	33%	116,580	45,010	83,408,554
Gabon	1,388	14,940	720	1,900	1%	3,250	1,250	2,341,179
Ethiopia	1,356	14,600	737	1,910	14%	163,140	62,990	120,283,026
Pakistan	1,318	14,190	758	1,960	40%	305,100	117,800	231,402,117
Panama	1,298	13,970	770	2,000	8%	5,650	2,180	4,351,267
Ivory Coast	1,274	13,710	785	2,030	11%	35,000	14,000	27,478,249
Peru	1,273	13,700	786	2,040	3%	42,903	16,565	33,715,471
Italy	1,214	13,070	824	2,130	24%	71,928	27,772	59,240,329
Bhutan	1,209	13,010	827	2,140	2%	940	360	777,486
New Zealand	1,201	12,930	833	2,160	2%	6,160	2,380	5,129,727
Uzbekistan	1,178	12,680	849	2,200	9%	40,161	15,506	34,081,449
El Salvador	1,142	12,290	876	2,270	35%	7,210	2,780	6,314,167
Iraq	1,141	12,280	876	2,270	11%	49,690	19,190	43,533,592
India	1,097	11,810	911	2,360	52%	1,544,479	596,327	1,407,563,842
Kenya	1,094	11,780	914	2,370	10%	58,000	22,000	53,005,614
Saint Kitts and Nevis	1,050	11,300	952	2,470	19%	50	19	47,606
Madagascar	1,038	11,170	964	2,500	5%	30,000	12,000	28,915,653
Burundi	1,012	10,890	988	2,560	49%	12,700	4,900	12,551,213
Botswana	1,004	10,810	996	2,580	0.5%	2,600	1,000	2,588,423
Honduras	990	10,700	1,010	2,600	9%	10,180	3,930	10,278,345
Luxembourg	977	10,520	1,023	2,650	24%	625	241	639,321
Mauritania	975	10,490	1,026	2,660	0.4%	4,500	1,700	4,614,974
Liberia	963	10,370	1,039	2,690	5%	5,000	1,900	5,193,416
Indonesia	961	10,340	1,041	2,700	14%	263,000	102,000	273,753,191
Saudi Arabia	954	10,270	1,048	2,710	2%	34,300	13,200	35,950,396
Suriname	946	10,180	1,057	2,740	0.4%	580	220	612,985
Congo	942	10,140	1,061	2,750	2%	5,500	2,100	5,835,806
Rwanda	942	10,140	1,061	2,750	51%	12,684	4,897	13,461,888
Portugal	938	10,100	1,066	2,760	11%	9,652	3,727	10,290,103
Venezuela	922	9,920	1,085	2,810	3%	26,000	10,000	28,199,867
United Kingdom	893	9,610	1,120	2,900	25%	60,098	23,204	67,281,039
North Korea	884	9,520	1,132	2,930	19%	22,950	8,860	25,971,909
Guatemala	883	9,500	1,133	2,930	15%	15,540	6,000	17,608,483
Haiti	878	9,450	1,139	2,950	36%	10,050	3,880	11,447,569
Ireland	874	9,410	1,144	2,960	6%	4,360	1,680	4,986,526
Wallis and Futuna	860	9,300	1,163	3,010	7%	10	3.9	11,627
Tajikistan	859	9,250	1,163	3,010	6%	8,380	3,240	9,750,064
Slovenia	854	9,190	1,171	3,030	9%	1,810	700	2,119,410
Cabo Verde	850	9,100	1,176	3,050	12%	500	190	587,925
Timor-Leste	844	9,080	1,185	3,070	7%	1,115	431	1,320,942
Fiji	831	8,940	1,204	3,120	4%	768	297	924,610
Georgia	830	8,900	1,204	3,120	4%	3,120	1,200	3,757,980
Dominica	829	8,920	1,207	3,130	8%	60	23	72,412
Comoros	791	8,510	1,264	3,270	35%	650	250	821,625
Dominican Republic	789	8,490	1,268	3,280	18%	8,770	3,390	11,117,873
Cyprus	765	8,230	1,308	3,390	10%	952	368	1,244,188
China	763	8,210	1,310	3,400	12%	1,088,620	420,320	1,425,893,465
Belgium	746	8,030	1,341	3,470	29%	8,656	3,342	11,611,419
Nepal	704	7,580	1,421	3,680	15%	21,137	8,161	30,034,989
Vietnam	696	7,490	1,436	3,720	22%	67,870	26,200	97,468,029
Chile	674	7,250	1,484	3,840	2%	13,139	5,073	19,493,184
Somalia	645	6,940	1,551	4,020	2%	11,000	4,200	17,065,581
Sri Lanka	630	6,800	1,587	4,110	22%	13,720	5,300	21,773,441
Vanuatu	627	6,750	1,596	4,130	2%	200	77	319,137
San Marino	588	6,330	1,700	4,400	33%	20	7.7	33,745
Mauritius	577	6,210	1,732	4,490	38%	750	290	1,298,915
Ecuador	575	6,190	1,738	4,500	4%	10,240	3,950	17,797,737
Netherlands	573	6,170	1,745	4,520	30%	10,030	3,870	17,501,696
Guadeloupe	549	5,910	1,820	4,700	13%	218	84	396,051
Mayotte	546	5,880	1,832	4,740	46%	173	67	316,014
Samoa	516	5,550	1,938	5,020	4%	113	44	218,764
Philippines	491	5,290	2,037	5,280	19%	55,900	21,600	113,880,328
Bangladesh	479	5,160	2,088	5,410	62%	81,100	31,300	169,356,251
Costa Rica	471	5,070	2,121	5,490	5%	2,430	940	5,153,957
Switzerland	455	4,900	2,198	5,690	10%	3,955	1,527	8,691,406
French Guiana	446	4,800	2,240	5,800	0.2%	133	51	297,449
Liechtenstein	443	4,770	2,257	5,850	11%	17	6.6	39,039
Antigua and Barbuda	429	4,620	2,330	6,000	9%	40	15	93,219
Jamaica	424	4,560	2,356	6,100	11%	1,200	460	2,827,695
Israel	424	4,560	2,361	6,110	17%	3,770	1,460	8,900,059
Colombia	387	4,170	2,585	6,700	2%	19,930	7,700	51,516,562
Yemen	351	3,780	2,848	7,380	2%	11,580	4,470	32,981,641
Réunion	351	3,780	2,852	7,390	13%	339	131	966,129
Papua New Guinea	333	3,580	3,006	7,790	0.7%	3,310	1,280	9,949,437
Japan	328	3,530	3,050	7,900	11%	40,860	15,780	124,612,530
Solomon Islands	325	3,500	3,078	7,970	0.8%	230	89	707,851
Equatorial Guinea	324	3,490	3,084	7,990	2%	530	200	1,634,466
British Virgin Islands	321	3,460	3,112	8,060	7%	10	3.9	31,122
Martinique	297	3,200	3,371	8,730	10%	109	42	368,796
Cook Islands	294	3,160	3,401	8,810	2%	5	1.9	17,003
Egypt	282	3,040	3,551	9,200	3%	30,770	11,880	109,262,178
South Korea	259	2,790	3,859	9,990	14%	13,430	5,190	51,830,139
Taiwan	250	2,700	3,997	10,350	17%	5,970	2,310	23,859,912
Lebanon	249	2,680	4,015	10,400	14%	1,393	538	5,592,631
Barbados	249	2,680	4,017	10,400	16%	70	27	281,200
Malaysia	246	2,650	4,065	10,530	3%	8,260	3,190	33,573,874
Grenada	241	2,590	4,154	10,760	9%	30	12	124,610
Turks and Caicos Islands	222	2,390	4,511	11,680	1%	10	3.9	45,114
American Samoa	215	2,310	4,643	12,030	5%	10	3.9	45,035
New Caledonia	207	2,230	4,821	12,490	0.3%	60	23	287,800
Bahamas	196	2,110	5,099	13,210	0.8%	80	31	407,906
Saint Vincent and the Grenadines	192	2,070	5,217	13,510	5%	20	7.7	104,332
Aruba	188	2,020	5,327	13,800	11%	20	7.7	106,537
Oman	183	1,970	5,472	14,170	0.3%	826	319	4,520,471
Sao Tome and Principe	179	1,930	5,578	14,450	4%	40	15	223,107
Jordan	179	1,930	5,597	14,500	2%	1,992	769	11,148,278
Micronesia	177	1,910	5,657	14,650	3%	20	7.7	113,131
Palau	166	1,790	6,008	15,560	0.7%	3	1.2	18,024
Trinidad and Tobago	164	1,770	6,103	15,810	5%	250	97	1,525,663
Kiribati	155	1,670	6,444	16,690	2%	20	7.7	128,874
Puerto Rico	154	1,660	6,486	16,800	6%	502	194	3,256,028
Saint Lucia	149	1,600	6,729	17,430	4%	27	10	179,651
Malta	148	1,590	6,753	17,490	24%	78	30	526,748
Montenegro	3,025	32,560	330	850	14%	1,899	733	627,859
Marshall Islands	119	1,280	8,410	21,800	3%	5	1.9	42,050
Andorra	95	1,020	10,572	27,380	2%	7	2.7	79,034
US Virgin Islands	90	970	11,121	28,800	3%	9	3.5	100,091
Brunei	90	970	11,134	28,840	0.8%	40	15	445,373
French Polynesia	82	880	12,161	31,500	0.7%	25	9.7	304,032
Palestine	82	880	12,252	31,730	7%	419	162	5,133,392
Qatar	78	840	12,801	33,150	2%	210	81	2,688,235
Maldives	75	810	13,371	34,630	13%	39	15	521,457
Western Sahara	71	760	14,140	36,600	0.02%	40	15	565,581
Guam	59	640	17,053	44,170	2%	10	3.9	170,534
United Arab Emirates	54	580	18,619	48,220	0.7%	503	194	9,365,145
Bermuda	47	510	21,395	55,410	6%	3	1.2	64,185
Cayman Islands	29	310	34,068	88,240	0.8%	2	0.77	68,136
Djibouti	27	290	36,852	95,450	0.1%	30	12	1,105,557
Kuwait	19	200	53,126	137,600	0.4%	80	31	4,250,114
Northern Mariana Islands	16	170	61,851	160,190	0.2%	1	0.39	49,481
Bahrain	14	150	69,679	180,470	3%	21	8.1	1,463,265
Seychelles	14	150	70,981	183,840	0.3%	2	0.77	106,471
Faroe Islands	13	140	75,556	195,690	0.05%	1	0.39	52,889
Hong Kong	2.7	29	374,729	970,540	2%	20	7.7	7,494,578
Singapore	0.9	9.7	1,060,904	2,747,730	0.8%	6	2.3	5,941,060
