= Demographics of Belarus =

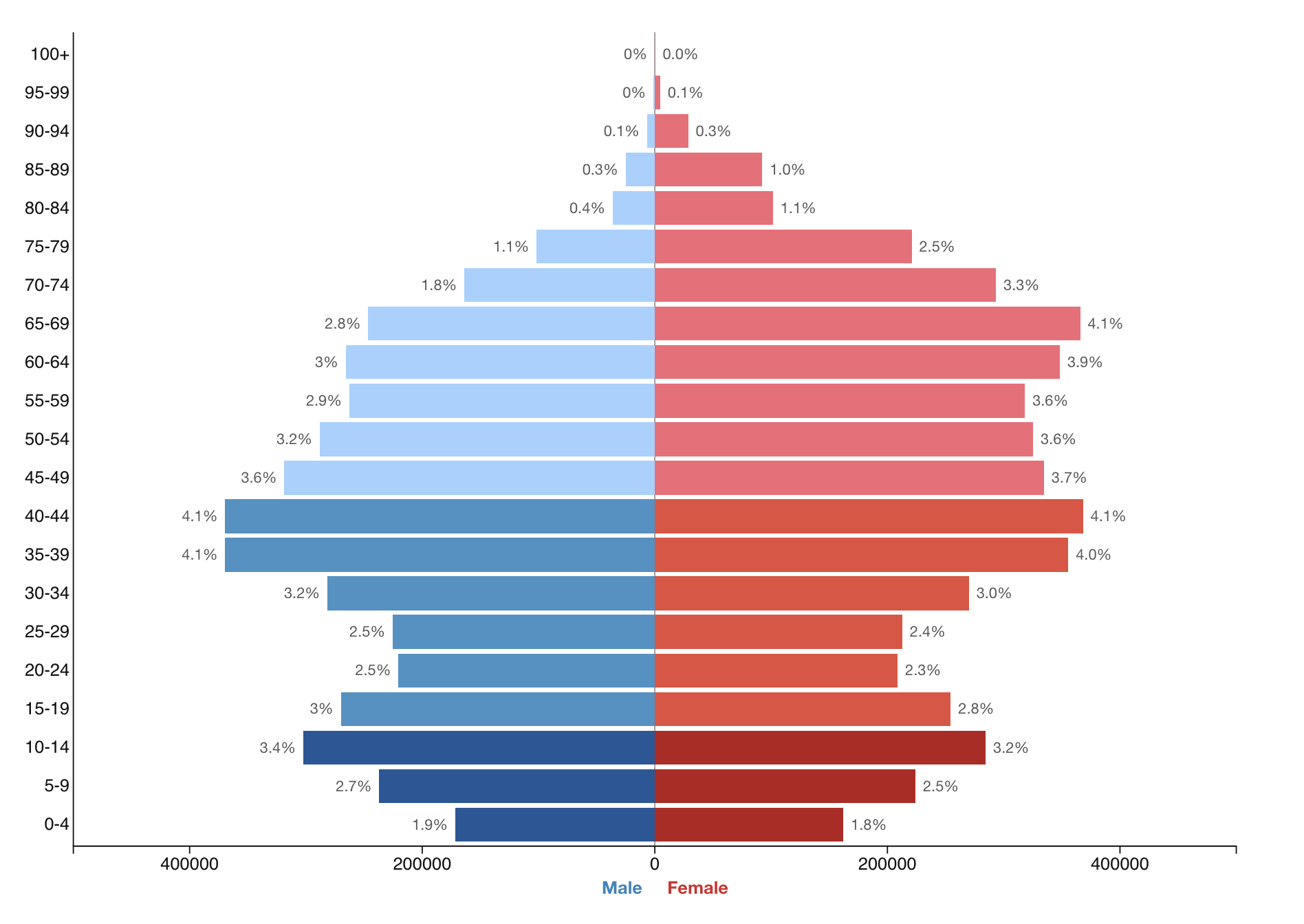
- Population pyramid of Belarus in 2026
- Population: 9,056,080 (2026)
- Fertility rate: ▼1.03 (2025)
- Immigrant share: 11.6% (2024)

Age structure
- 0–14 years: 16.9% (male 821,285/female 772,360)
- 15–64 years: 67.7% (male 3,053,618/female 3,314,835)
- 65 and over: 15.4% (male 479,740/female 971,608) (2019 census)

Sex ratio
- Total: 0.87 male(s)/female (2014)
- At birth: 1.06 male(s)/female
- Under 15: 1.06 male(s)/female
- 15–64 years: 0.94 male(s)/female
- 65 and over: 0.46 male(s)/female

Nationality
- Nationality: noun: Belarusian(s) adjective: Belarusian
- Major ethnic: Belarusians (84.9%)
- Minor ethnic: Russians, Poles and other European minority groups account for the remainder (15.1%)

Language
- Spoken: Russian, Belarusian

Historical population
Year	Pop.	±% p.a.
1914	7,515,100	—
1926	4,983,240	−3.37%
1937	5,196,549	+0.38%
1940	10,400,000 (Note: This includes 1.35 million of inhabitants of Belastok Oblast, most of which was transferred to Poland in 1944.)	+26.02%
1951	7,781,100	−2.60%
1959	8,055,700	+0.43%
1970	8,992,200	+1.00%
1979	9,532,500	+0.65%
1989	10,151,800	+0.63%
1999	10,045,200	−0.11%
2009	9,503,800	−0.55%
2019	9,413,446	−0.10%
2021	9,349,645	−0.34%
2026	9,056,080	−0.64%

The demographics of Belarus is about the demographic features of the population of Belarus, including population growth, population density, ethnicity, education level, health, economic status, religious affiliations, and other aspects of the population.

== Population ==
The population of Belarus suffered a dramatic decline during World War II, dropping from more than 9 million in 1940 to 7.7 million in 1951. It then resumed its long-term growth, rising to 10 million in 1999. After that the population began a steady decline, dropping to 9.7 million in 2006–2007. Originally a highly agrarian country with nearly 80% of its population in rural areas, Belarus has been undergoing a process of continuous urbanization. The rural population saw its share of the total population decrease from 70% in 1959 to less than 30% in the 2000s.

View source data.
View source data.

=== Population ===
9,109,280 (2025 est.)
country comparison to the world: 98

=== Age structure ===
0–14 years: 16.78% (male 791,170/female 414,450)
15–24 years: 9.59% (male 404,500/female 375,750)
25–54 years: 43.94% (male 2,058,648/female 2,105,910)
55–64 years: 14.45% (male 605,330/female 763,972)
65 years and over: 17.66% (male 327,300/female 355,163) (2022 est.)

=== Median age ===
Total: 40.9 years
Male: 39.5 years
Female: 43.9 years (2022 est.)

=== Sex ratio ===
At birth: 1.06 male(s)/female
0–14 years: 87.266 male(s)/female
15–24 years: 87.266 male(s)/female
25–54 years: 0.98 male(s)/female
55–64 years: 0.79 male(s)/female
65 years and over: 0.48 male(s)/female
Total population: 87.266 male(s)/female (2024 est.)

Population change in Belarus, 1970 – 2010
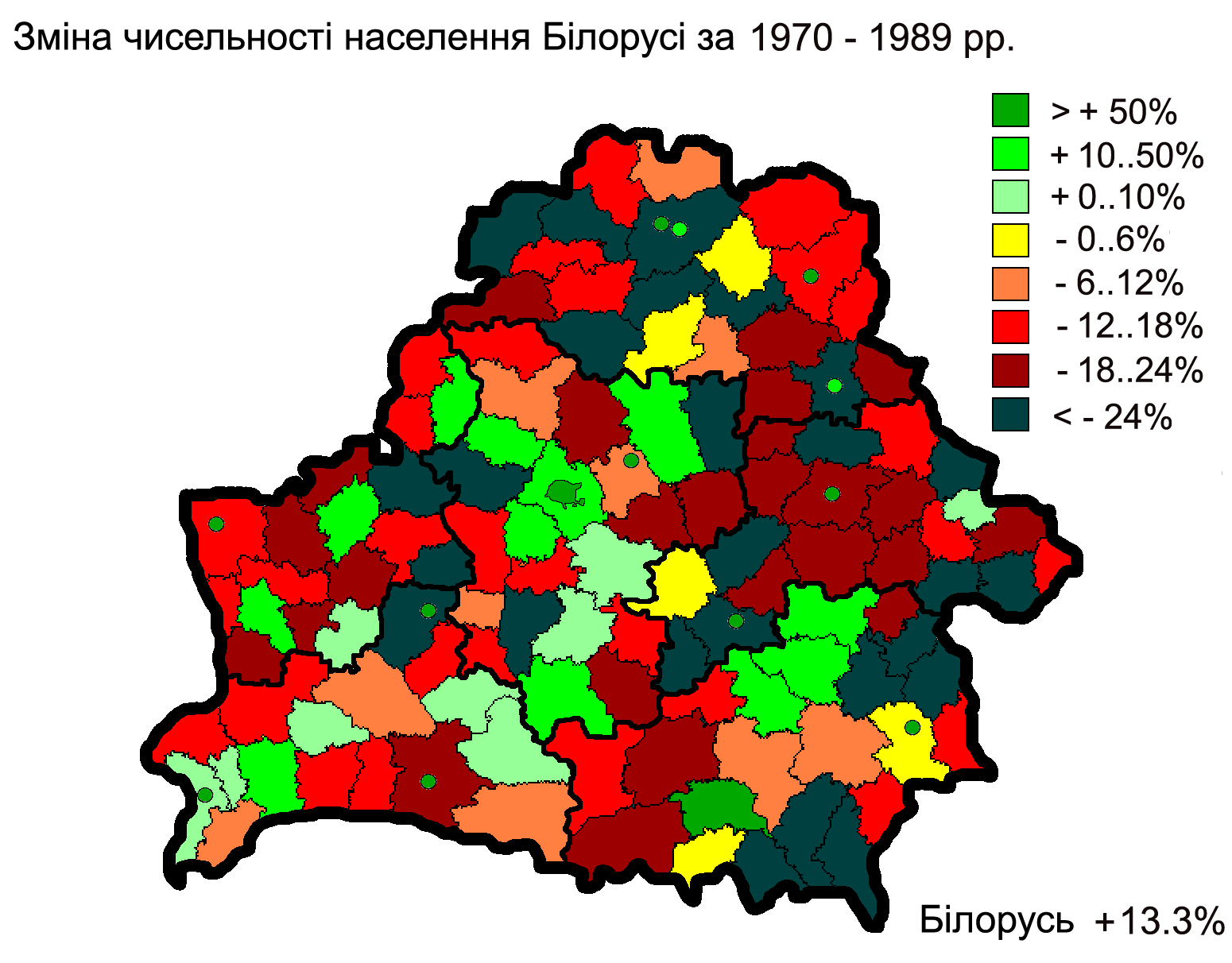
1970–1989

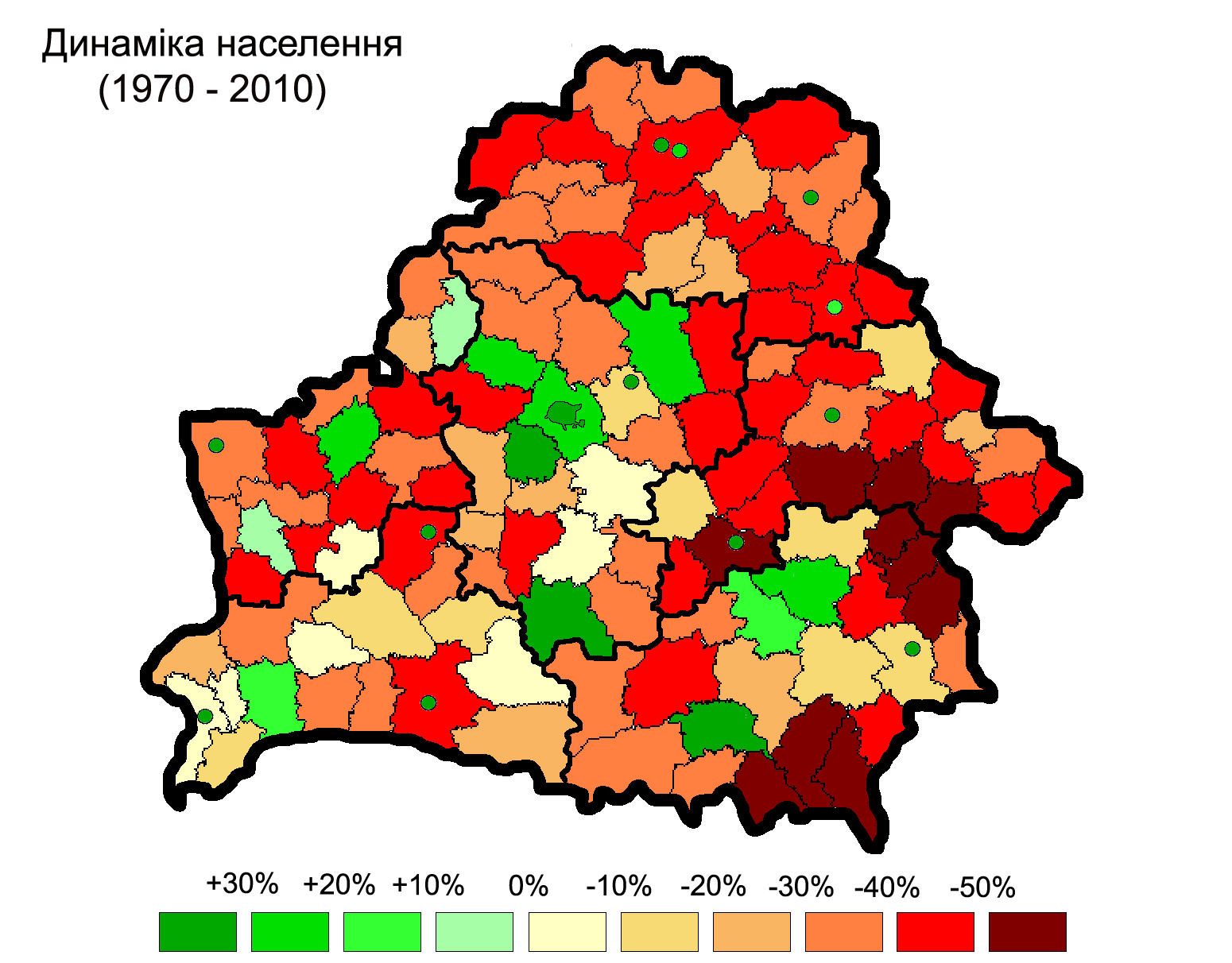
1970–2010

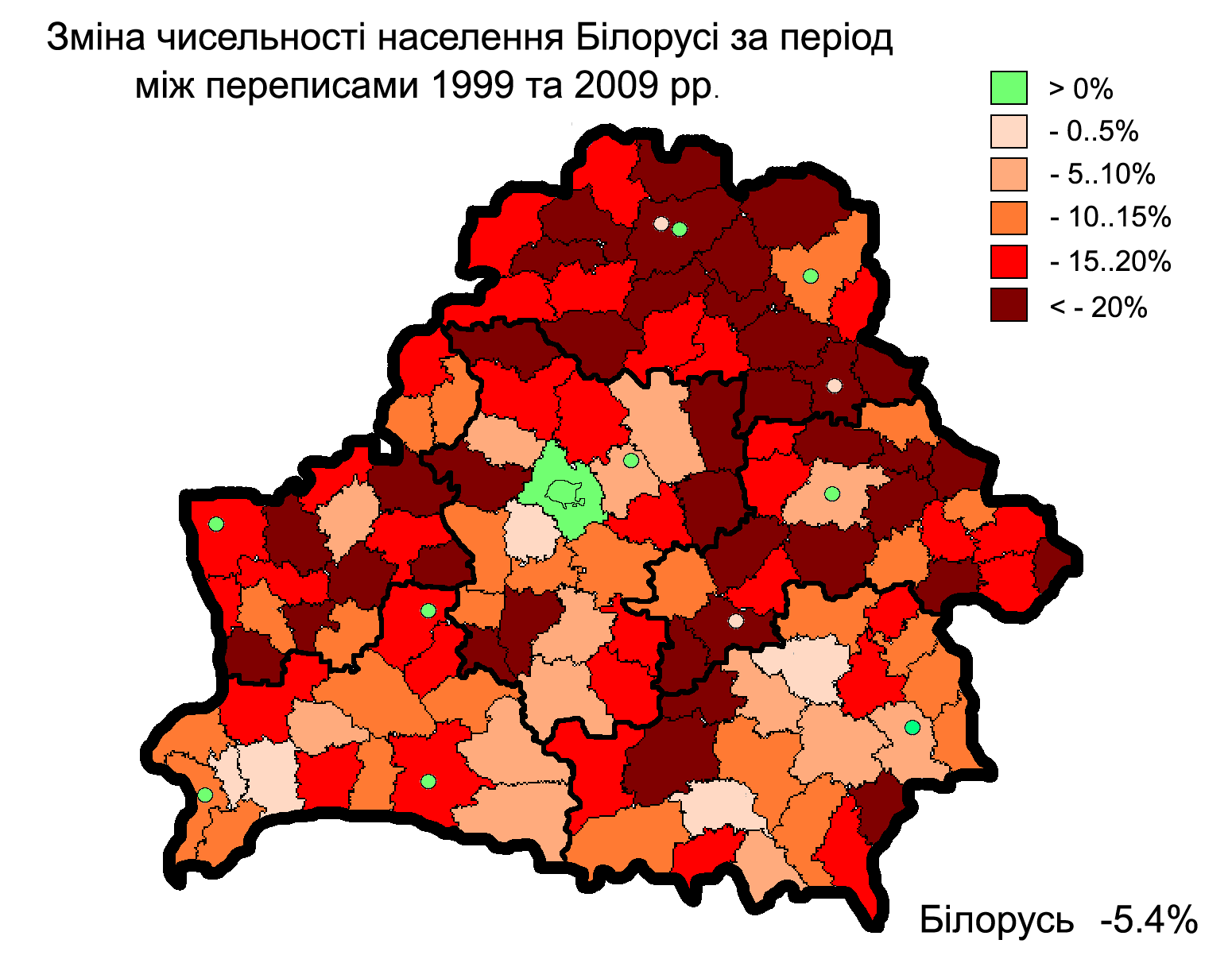
1999–2010

=== Life expectancy at birth ===
Life expectancy in Belarus since 1900

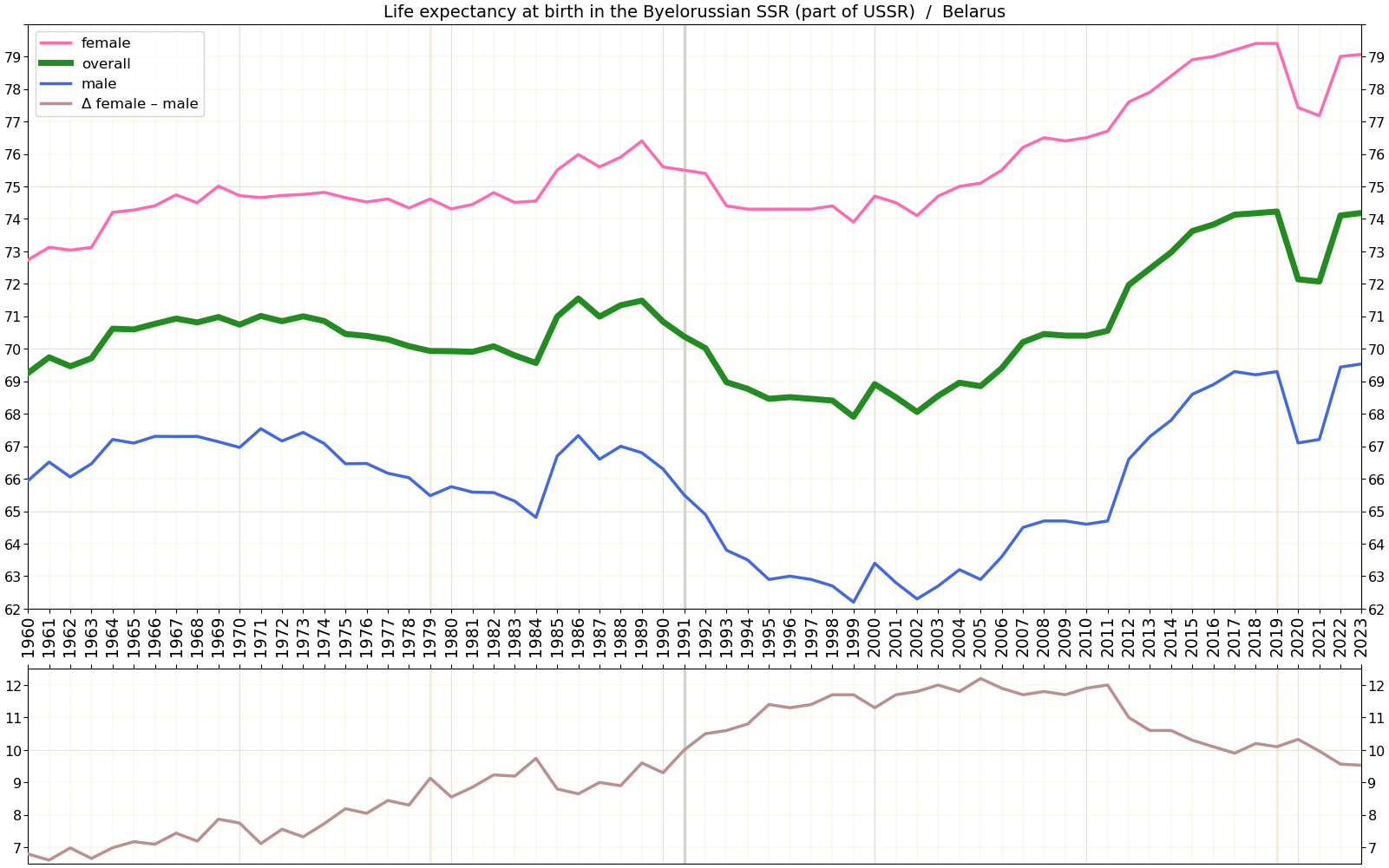
Life expectancy in Belarus since 1960 by gender

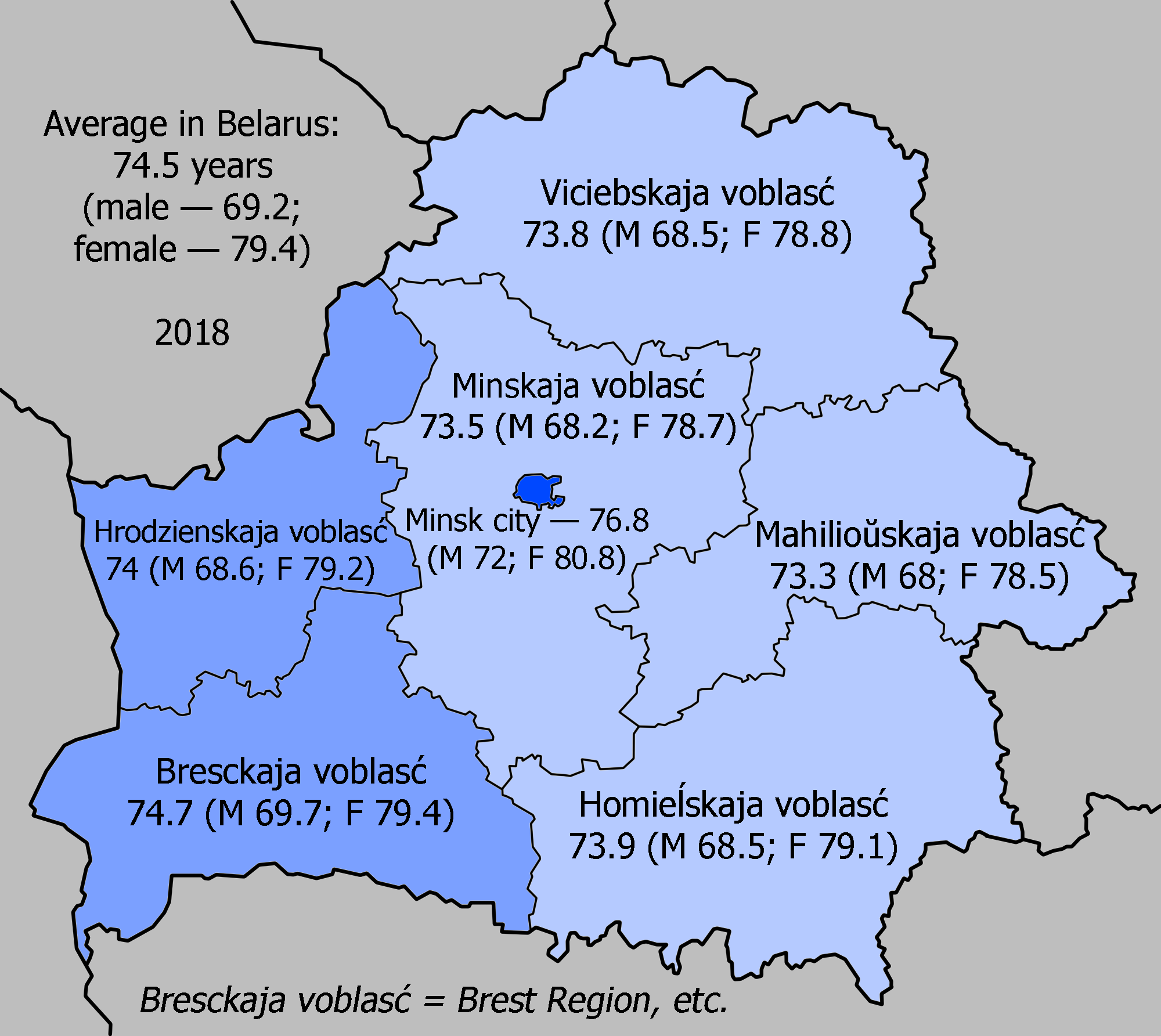
Average life expectancy at birth in Belarus (2018)

Total population: 72.15 years
country comparison to the world: 138
Male: 66.53 years
Female: 78.1 years (2014 est.)

Period	Life expectancy in Years
1950–1955	60.71
1955–1960	▲66.32
1960–1965	▲69.11
1965–1970	▲70.37
1970–1975	▲70.51
1975–1980	▼70.41
1980–1985	▼70.14
1985–1990	▲71.35
1990–1995	▼69.44
1995–2000	▼67.42
2000–2005	▲67.83
2005–2010	▲69.25
2010–2015	▲72.15

=== Total fertility rate (TFR) in Belarus by region and year ===
Region	2024	2017	2016	2015	2010	2005
Belarus (total)	1.08	1.54	1.73	1.72	1.49	1.25
Minsk	0.69	1.06	1.21	1.24	1.25	1.08
Vitebsk Oblast	1.13	1.45	1.63	1.62	1.42	1.19
Mogilev Oblast	1.25	1.65	1.85	1.83	1.49	1.25
Gomel Oblast	1.20	1.72	1.93	1.89	1.55	1.28
Grodno Oblast	1.19	1.75	2.03	1.96	1.63	1.30
Brest Oblast	1.41	1.89	2.10	2.06	1.73	1.45
Minsk Oblast	1.14	1.94	2.16	2.18	1.72	1.37

Years	1880	1881	1882	1883	1884	1885	1886	1887	1888	1889
Total Fertility Rate in Belarus	7.00	6.95	6.89	6.84	6.78	6.73	6.68	6.62	6.57	6.51

Years	1890	1891	1892	1893	1894	1895	1896	1897	1898	1899
Total Fertility Rate in Belarus	6.46	6.41	6.35	6.30	6.24	6.19	6.14	6.08	6.05	6.02

TFR	Years									
TFR	1900	1901	1902	1903	1904	1905	1906	1907	1908	1909
TFR	5.99	5.96	5.92	5.89	5.86	5.83	5.8	5.77	5.73	5.7
TFR	1910	1911	1912	1913	1914	1915	1916	1917	1918	1919
TFR	5.67	5.64	5.61	5.58	5.54	5.51	5.48	5.45	5.42	5.38
TFR	1920	1921	1922	1923	1924	1925	1926	1927	1928	1929
TFR	5.35	5.32	5.29	5.26	5.23	5.19	5.16	5.05	4.94	4.83
TFR	1930	1931	1932	1933	1934	1935	1936	1937	1938	1939
TFR	4.71	4.6	4.49	4.38	4.26	4.15	4.04	3.93	3.82	3.7
TFR	1940	1941	1942	1943	1944	1945	1946	1947	1948	1949
TFR	3.59	3.49	3.38	3.27	3.17	3.06	2.96	2.85	2.74	2.64
TFR	1950	1951	1952	1953	1954	1955	1956	1957	1958	
TFR	2.5	2.53	2.59	2.64	2.68	2.71	2.73	2.74	2.73	

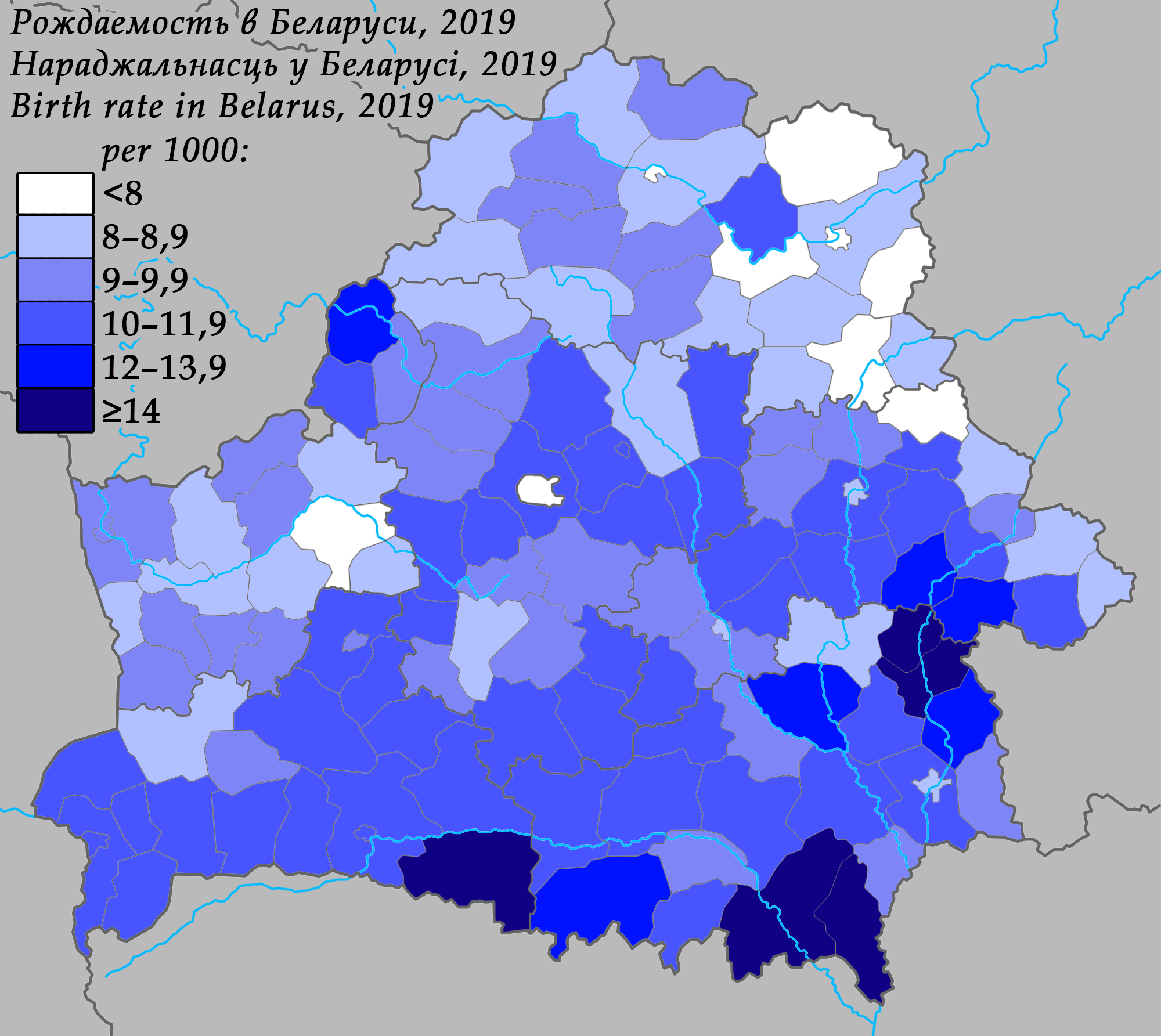
Birth rate (by district, 2019)

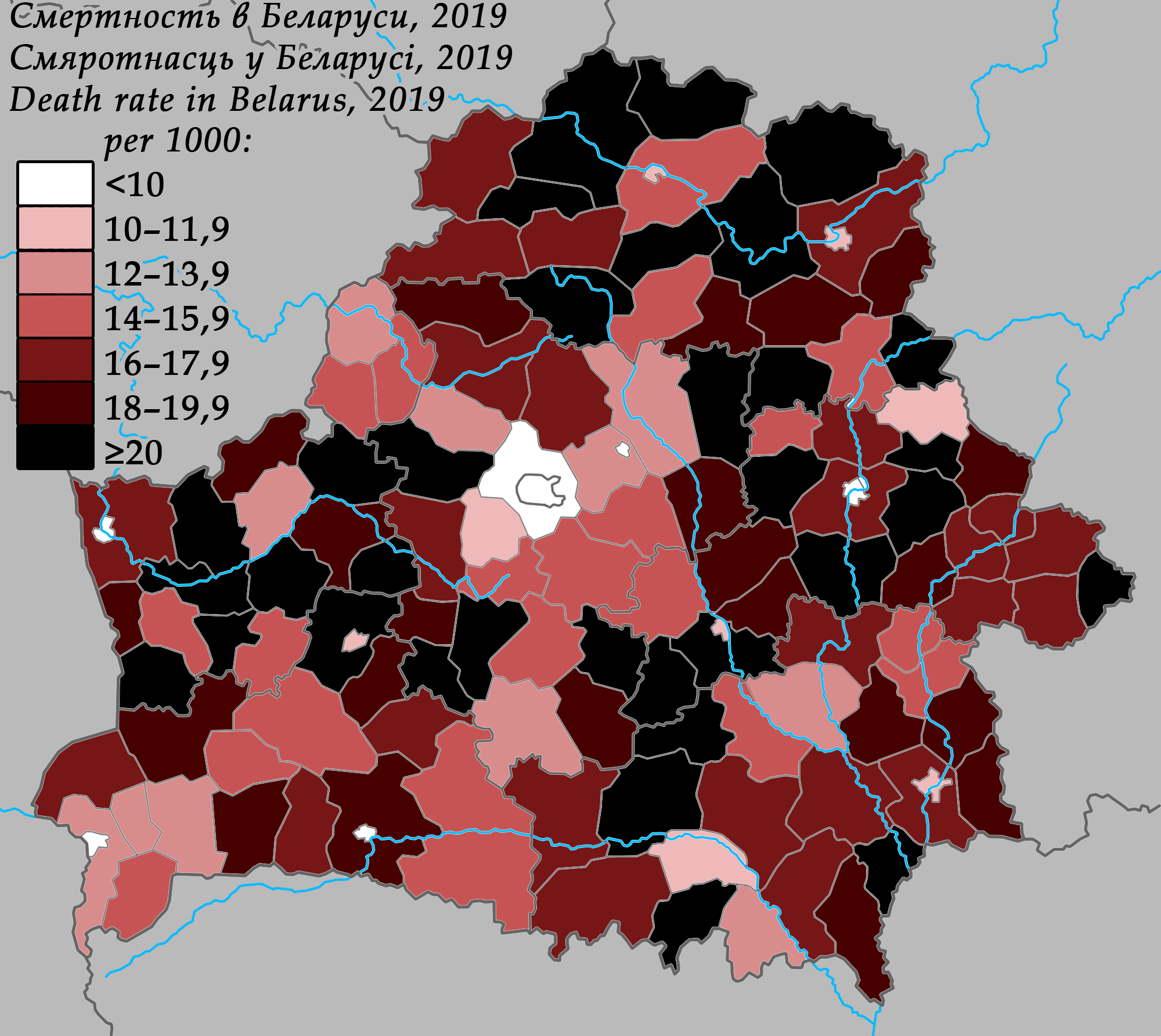
Mortality rate (by district, 2019)

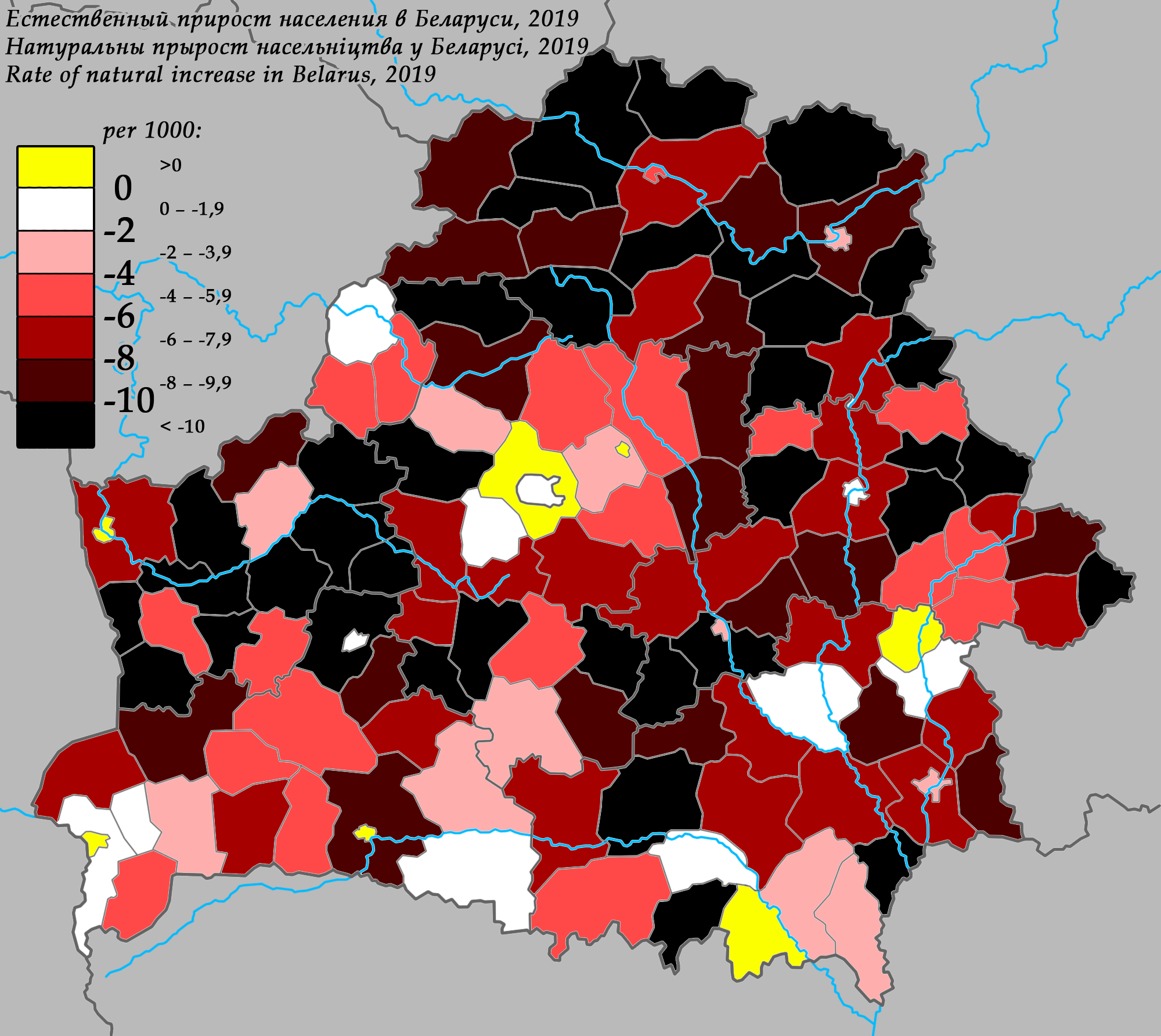
Rate of natural increase (by district, 2019)

=== Infant mortality rate ===
Total: 4.0 ▼ deaths/1,000 live births for 429 death. (2010)
Total: 3.9 ▼ deaths/1,000 live births for 422 death. (2011)
Total: 3.4 ▼ deaths/1,000 live births for 386 death. (2012)
Total: 3.5 ▲ deaths/1,000 live births for 407 death. (2013)
Total: 3.5 deaths/1,000 live births for 415 death. (2014)

Total: 3.5 ▼ deaths/1,000 live births for 321 death. (January–September 2014)
Total: 3.2 ▲ deaths/1,000 live births for 283 death. (January–September 2015)

== Vital statistics ==
=== Present-day Belarus ===
Notable events in Belarusian demographics :

- 1914-1918 – World War I
- 1917-1923 – Russian Civil War
- 1939-1945 – World War II
- 1944-1947 – Population exchange between Poland and Soviet Belarus
- 1946-1947 – Famine
- 1991 – Collapse of the Soviet Union
- 2020-2023 – COVID-19 pandemic

Year	Average population	Live births	Deaths	Natural change	Crude birth rate (per 1000)	Crude death rate (per 1000)	Natural change (per 1000)	Crude migration change (per 1000)	Crude population change (per 1000)	Total fertility rate	Abortions reported
1914	7,515,100	278,700	161,000	117,700	37.1	21.4	15.7				
1915	7,632,800	202,400	226,700	-24,300	26.5	29.7	-3.2				
1916	7,036,500	181,200	235,700	-54,500	25.8	33.5	-7.7				
1917	6,954,400	171,400	229,700	-58,300	24.6	33.0	-8.4				
1918	6,842,300	225,400	251,800	-26,400	32.9	36.8	-3.9				
1919	6,612,000	222,700	232,700	-10,000	33.7	35.2	-1.5				
1920	6,636,700	225,400	225,400	10,600	35.6	34.0	1.6				
1921	6,693,700	263,700	157,900	105,800	39.4	23.6	15.8				
1922	6,938,700	286,300	147,000	139,300	41.3	21.2	20.1				
1923	7,183,000	303,900	116,400	187,500	42.3	16.2	26.1				
1924	7,430,300	299,200	118,400	180,800	40.3	15.9	24.3				
1925	7,604,300	316,600	136,500	180,100	41.6	18.0	23.7				
1926	7,776,300	315,400	125,000	190,400	40.6	16.1	24.5				
1927	7,967,100	306,600	124,400	182,200	38.5	15.6	22.9				
1928	8,112,100	300,900	124,600	176,300	37.1	15.4	21.7				
1929	8,225,500	295,800	133,900	161,900	36.0	16.3	19.7				
1930	8,315,500	301,000	127,100	173,900	36.2	15.3	20.9				
1931	8,412,400	293,900	114,100	179,800	34.9	13.6	21.4				
1932	8,564,700	290,800	113,400	177,400	34.0	13.2	20.7				
1933	8,688,800	250,700	113,400	137,300	28.9	13.1	15.8				
1934	8,770,800	250,500	116,300	134,200	28.6	13.3	15.3				
1935	8,804,500	246,600	114,800	131,800	28.0	13.0	15.0				
1936	8,813,500	251,000	124,400	126,600	28.5	14.1	14.4				
1937	8,842,300	262,800	111,700	151,100	29.7	12.6	17.1				
1938	8,871,100	270,200	116,500	153,700	30.5	13.1	17.3				
1939	8,908,600	257,800	120,400	137,400	28.9	13.5	15.4				
1940	9,046,000	243,400	118,400	125,000	26.9	13.1	13.8				
1941	9,183,400	215,900			23.5						
1942			173,000								
1943			125,800								
1944			139,900								
1945	6,264,800	126,600			20.2						
1946	6,540,000	157,400	65,700	91,700	24.1	10.0	14.0				
1947	7,169,900	186,000	70,800	115,200	25.9	9.9	16.1				
1948	7,384,300	185,300	64,200	121,100	25.1	8.7	16.4				
1949	7,584,300	212,400	61,700	150,700	28.0	8.1	19.9				
1950	7,745,000	197,200	62,000	135,200	25.5	8.0	17.5	-14.5	2.6		
1951	7,765,000	198,200	61,200	137,000	25.5	7.9	17.6	-23.3	-5.7		
1952	7,721,000	191,100	64,200	126,900	24.8	8.3	16.4	-20.4	-4.0		
1953	7,690,000	176,200	61,900	114,300	22.9	8.0	14.9	-10.7	4.2		
1954	7,722,000	193,100	61,600	131,500	25.0	8.0	17.0	-6.4	10.6		
1955	7,804,000	194,400	58,000	136,400	24.9	7.4	17.5	-7.8	9.7		
1956	7,880,000	199,500	56,000	143,500	25.3	7.1	18.2	-11.1	7.1		
1957	7,936,000	200,800	58,000	142,800	25.3	7.3	18.0	-8.8	9.2		
1958	8,009,000	207,700	53,700	154,000	25.9	6.7	19.2	-6.3	12.9		
1959	8,112,000	204,600	62,600	142,000	25.2	7.7	17.5	-7.9	9.6	2.72	
1960	8,190,000	200,218	54,037	146,181	24.4	6.6	17.8	-6.3	11.5	2.69	170,787
1961	8,284,000	194,239	53,682	140,557	23.4	6.5	17.0	-4.8	12.2	2.66	178,290
1962	8,385,000	185,302	60,676	124,626	22.1	7.2	14.9	-6.3	8.7	2.57	185,554
1963	8,458,000	173,889	58,291	115,598	20.6	6.9	13.7	-6.5	7.2	2.46	191,137
1964	8,519,000	161,794	53,967	107,827	19.0	6.3	12.7	-2.4	10.3	2.36	200,534
1965	8,607,000	153,865	58,156	95,709	17.9	6.8	11.1	0.8	11.9	2.27	205,999
1966	8,709,000	153,414	58,265	95,149	17.6	6.7	10.9	-0.5	10.4	2.28	203,430
1967	8,800,000	147,501	61,263	86,238	16.8	7.0	9.8	-1.1	8.8	2.26	203,722
1968	8,877,000	146,095	62,354	83,741	16.5	7.0	9.4	-0.4	9.0	2.23	198,955
1969	8,957,000	142,652	65,912	76,740	15.9	7.4	8.6	0.4	9.0	2.18	191,637
1970	9,038,000	146,676	68,974	77,702	16.2	7.6	8.6	-0.4	8.2	2.30	187,935
1971	9,112,000	149,135	68,511	80,624	16.4	7.5	8.8	-1.6	7.2	2.34	190,169
1972	9,178,000	147,813	71,866	75,947	16.1	7.8	8.3	-1.0	7.3	2.36	185,101
1973	9,245,000	144,729	73,927	70,802	15.7	8.0	7.7	-0.5	7.2	2.29	193,503
1974	9,312,000	146,876	73,181	73,695	15.8	7.9	7.9	-2.0	5.9	2.24	194,247
1975	9,367,000	146,517	79,701	66,816	15.6	8.5	7.1	-1.5	5.5	2.20	194,710
1976	9,411,000	147,912	82,400	65,512	15.7	8.8	7.0	-1.5	5.5	2.16	199,121
1977	9,463,000	148,963	84,565	64,398	15.7	8.9	6.8	-0.2	6.6	2.11	202,146
1978	9,525,000	151,053	86,612	64,441	15.9	9.1	6.8	0.0	6.8	2.08	201,619
1979	9,590,000	151,800	90,837	60,963	15.8	9.5	6.4	0.7	7.1	2.05	203,446
1980	9,658,000	154,432	95,514	58,918	16.0	9.9	6.1	1.6	7.7	2.04	201,852
1981	9,732,000	157,899	93,136	64,763	16.2	9.6	6.7	0.7	7.4	2.08	202,340
1982	9,804,000	159,364	93,840	65,524	16.3	9.6	6.7	0.2	6.9	2.02	198,011
1983	9,872,000	173,510	97,849	75,661	17.6	9.9	7.7	-1.0	6.7	2.09	207,461
1984	9,938,000	168,749	104,274	64,475	17.0	10.5	6.5	-0.4	6.1	2.14	210,844
1985	9,999,000	165,034	105,690	59,344	16.6	10.6	5.9	0.0	5.9	2.09	200,888
1986	10,058,000	171,611	97,276	74,335	17.1	9.7	7.4	-2.1	5.3	2.10	171,114
1987	10,111,000	162,937	99,921	63,016	16.2	9.9	6.2	-2.9	3.3	2.04	163,761
1988	10,144,000	163,193	102,671	60,522	16.1	10.1	6.0	-3.3	2.7	2.03	140,921
1989	10,170,374	153,449	103,479	49,970	15.1	10.2	4.9	-3.1	1.8	2.03	256,041
1990	10,189,348	142,167	109,582	32,585	14.0	10.8	3.2	-3.1	0.1	1.91	260,839
1991	10,194,050	132,045	114,650	17,395	13.0	11.2	1.7	-0.9	0.8	1.81	241,138
1992	10,216,470	127,971	116,674	11,297	12.5	11.4	1.1	2.5	3.6	1.76	240,387
1993	10,239,050	117,384	128,544	-11,160	11.5	12.6	-1.1	2.0	0.9	1.62	217,957
1994	10,226,955	110,599	130,003	-19,404	10.8	12.7	-1.9	-1.3	-3.2	1.53	212,533
1995	10,193,831	101,144	133,775	-32,631	9.9	13.1	-3.2	0	-3.2	1.41	193,280
1996	10,159,569	95,798	133,422	-37,624	9.4	13.1	-3.7	0.2	-3.5	1.34	174,098
1997	10,117,433	89,586	136,653	-47,067	8.9	13.5	-4.7	-0.1	-4.8	1.25	152,660
1998	10,071,963	92,645	137,296	-44,651	9.2	13.6	-4.4	0.2	-4.2	1.30	145,339
1999	10,026,738	92,975	142,027	-49,052	9.3	14.2	-4.9	0.1	-4.8	1.31	135,829
2000	9,979,610	93,691	134,867	-41,176	9.4	13.5	-4.1	-0.5	-4.6	1.32	121,895
2001	9,928,549	91,720	140,299	-48,579	9.2	14.1	-4.9	-0.8	-5.7	1.29	101,402
2002	9,865,548	88,743	146,655	-57,912	9.0	14.9	-5.9	-1.1	-7.0	1.24	89,895
2003	9,796,749	88,512	143,200	-54,688	9.0	14.6	-5.6	-1.3	-6.9	1.23	80,174
2004	9,730,146	88,943	140,064	-51,121	9.1	14.4	-5.3	-1.6	-6.9	1.23	71,700
2005	9,663,915	90,508	141,857	-51,349	9.4	14.7	-5.3	-1.5	-6.9	1.25	64,655
2006	9,604,924	96,721	138,426	-41,705	10.1	14.4	-4.3	-1.0	-5.3	1.34	58,516
2007	9,560,953	103,626	132,993	-29,367	10.8	13.9	-3.1	-0.8	-3.9	1.43	46,287
2008	9,527,985	107,876	133,879	-26,003	11.3	14.1	-2.7	-0.3	-3.0	1.49	42,197
2009	9,504,583	109,263	135,097	-25,834	11.5	14.2	-2.7	0.8	-1.9	1.51	35,967
2010	9,483,836	108,050	137,132	-29,082	11.4	14.5	-3.1	0.6	-2.5	1.49	33,262
2011	9,461,643	109,147	135,090	-25,943	11.5	14.3	-2.7	0.5	-2.2	1.50	32,031
2012	9,446,836	115,893	126,531	-10,638	12.3	13.4	-1.1	0.2	-0.9	1.60	28,628
2013	9,443,211	117,997	125,326	-7,329	12.5	13.3	-0.8	1.0	0.2	1.65	31,206
2014	9,448,515	118,534	121,542	-3,008	12.5	12.9	-0.3	1.3	1.0	1.68	29,797
2015	9,461,076	119,028	120,026	-998	12.6	12.7	-0.1	1.8	1.7	1.71	29,217
2016	9,469,379	117,779	119,379	-1,600	12.4	12.6	-0.2	0.2	0.0	1.72	27,467
2017	9,458,989	102,556	119,311	-16,755	10.8	12.6	-1.8	-0.4	-2.2	1.53	25,249
2018	9,438,785	94,042	120,053	-26,011	10.0	12.7	-2.8	0.8	-2.0	1.45	23,305
2019	9,419,758	87,602	120,470	-32,868	9.3	12.8	-3.5	1.5	-2.0	1.39	21,289
2020	9,379,952	82,022	144,536	-62,514	8.7	15.4	-6.7	0.1	-6.6	1.33	18,180
2021	9,302,585	76,151	173,853	-97,702	8.1	18.6	-10.5	0.0	-10.1	1.29	16,861
2022	9,228,071	67,396	130,064	-61,417	7.3	13.9	-6.6	0.0	-6.4	1.19	16,696
2023	9,178,298	64,605	119,823	-55,218	7.0	13.0	-6.0	1.2	-4.8	1.15	15,871
2024	9,132,629	58,938	115,124	-56,186	6.5	12.6	-6.1	1.1	-5.1	1.08	14,444
2025	9,082,680	54,257	116,530	-62,273	6.0	12.8	-6.8	1.0	-5.8	1.03	
2026	9,056,080*										

* Data as of 1 January. Data as of 1 July are to be released.

=== Current vital statistics ===
Period	Live births	Deaths	Natural increase
January—December 2024	58,938	115,124	-56,131
January—December 2025	54,257	116,530	-62,273
Difference	▼ -4,681 (-7.94%)	▲ +1,406 (+1.22%)	▼ -6,087

BelStat did not provide official birth data between 2020 and 2024. However, according to BelStat the number of inhabitants age 0-4 has declined from 550,147 on 1 January 2019 to 388,693 on 1 January 2024, a 29.3% decline in five years. BelStat issued official statistics in 2025 for the first time since 2020 showing that there were 58,938 births in 2024.

=== Structure of the population ===
Population by Sex and Age Group (Census 04.X.2019):

Age group	Male	Female	Total	%
Total	4 351 473	5 061 973	9 413 446	100
0–4	270 610	255 488	526 098	5.59
5–9	288 068	273 160	561 228	5.96
10–14	259 437	246 882	506 319	5.38
15–19	234 423	221 344	455 767	4.84
20–24	228 635	219 413	448 048	4.76
25–29	305 775	310 546	616 321	6.55
30–34	388 316	392 937	781 253	8.30
35–39	367 695	381 356	749 051	7.96
40–44	325 233	345 140	670 373	7.12
45–49	302 148	337 685	639 833	6.80
50–54	289 385	333 961	623 346	6.62
55–59	319 173	385 127	704 300	7.48
60–64	292 835	387 326	680 161	7.23
65-69	202 723	310 845	513 568	5.46
70-74	123 837	219 468	343 305	3.65
75-79	67 798	160 061	227 859	2.42
80-84	55 715	164 022	219 737	2.33
85-89	21 467	80 001	101 468	1.08
90-94	7 173	31 583	38 756	0.41
95-99	966	5 300	6 266	0.07
100+	61	328	389	<0.01
Age group	Male	Female	Total	Percent
0–14	818 115	775 530	1 593 645	16.93
15–64	3 053 618	3 314 835	6 368 453	67.65
65+	479 740	971 608	1 451 348	15.42

== Migration ==
Net Migration Data for Belarus (1994–2024)
Year	Immigration	Emigration	Net Migration
1994	53,135	56,465	-3,330
1995	34,866	35,071	-205
1996	31,902	22,539	+9,363
1997	31,417	16,709	+14,708
1998	33,182	13,247	+19,935
1999	30,830	13,238	+17,592
2000	25,943	13,812	+12,131
2001	23,355	14,270	+9,085
2002	18,939	13,378	+5,561
2003	18,146	12,986	+5,160
2004	14,642	12,510	+2,132
2005	13,031	11,082	+1,949
2006	14,124	8,498	+5,626
2007	14,155	9,479	+4,676
2008	17,413	9,268	+8,145
2009	19,892	7,643	+12,249
2010	17,169	6,866	+10,303
2011	17,510	7,610	+9,900
2012	18,040	8,712	+9,328
2013	19,435	7,792	+11,643
2014	24,941	9,219	+15,722
2015	28,349	9,855	+18,494
2016	21,038	13,098	+7,940
2017	18,961	15,087	+3,874
2018	24,601	15,239	+9,362
2019	34,846	20,976	+13,870
2024	42,250	32,762	+9,488
2025	46,897	37,824	+9,073

Note: Data for 2020 to 2023 is unavailable.

== Ethnic groups ==
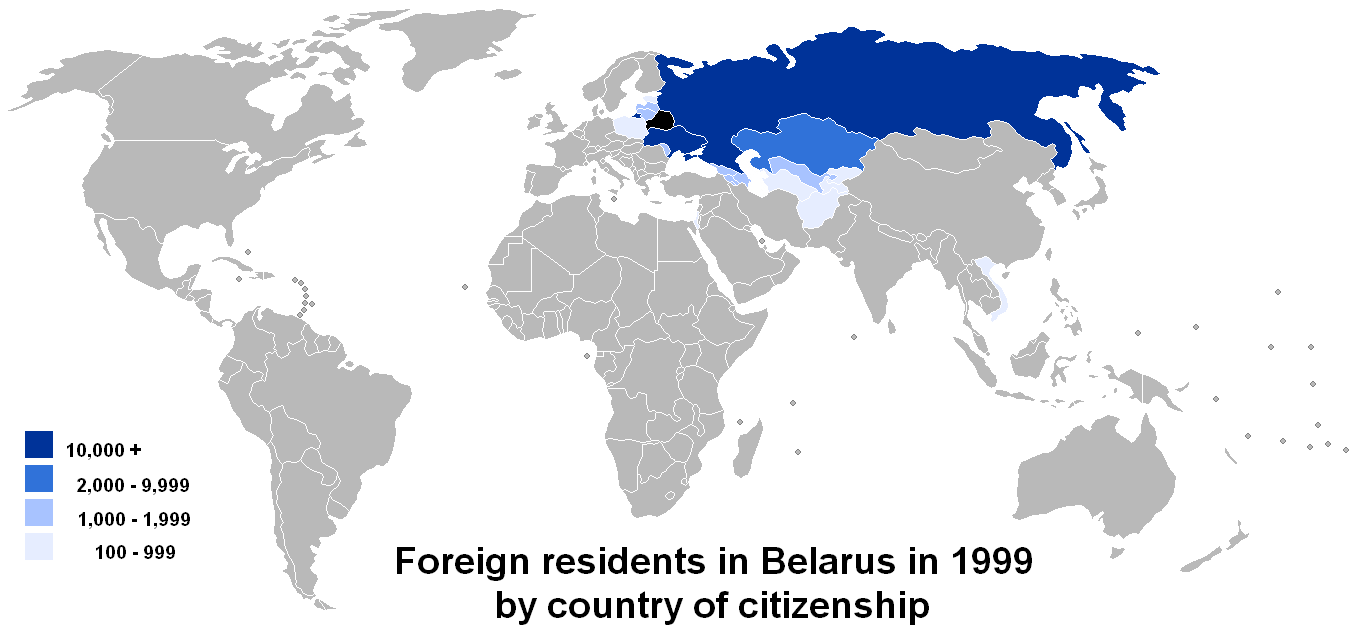

Belarusians 84.9%, Russians 7.5%, Poles 3.1%, Ukrainians 1.7%, Jews 0.1%, Armenians 0.1%, Lipka Tatars 0.1%, Ruska Roma 0.1%, Lithuanians 0.1%, Azerbaijanis 0.1%, others 2.2% (2019 census).

=== Prior to the Second World War ===
Prior to World War II, Jews were the second largest ethnic group in Belarus, and at 400,000 in the 1926 and 1939 censuses they even exceeded the number of Russians (although admittedly by a small margin). Jews accounted for 7%–8% of the total population at that time, comprising more than 40% of the population in cities and towns, where Jews and Poles were the majority, while Belarusians mostly lived in rural areas.

The Poles were the fourth largest ethnic group in Byelorussian SSR (current Eastern portion of Belarus), before World War II, comprising 1–2% of the population in the pre-war censuses (less than 100,000).

Population of the Byelorussian SSR according to ethnic group 1926–1939
Ethnic group	census 1926^{1}		census 1939^{2}	
Ethnic group	Number	%	Number	%
Belarusians	4,017,301	80.6	4,615,496	82.9
Jews	407,059	8.2	375,092	6.7
Russians	383,806	7.7	364,705	6.6
Poles	97,498	2.0	58,380	1.1
Ukrainians	34,681	0.7	104,247	1.9
Germans	7,075	0.1	8,448	0.2
Latvians	14,080	0.3	8,117	0.2
Tatars	3,777	0.1	7,664	0.1
Lithuanians	6,864	0.1	4,284	0.1
Roma	2,366	0.1	3,632	0.1
Mordvins	1,051	0.0	2,042	0.0
Others	7,682	0.2	16,887	0.3
Total	4,983,240		5,568,994	
^{1} Source: . ^{2} Source:.

=== After the Second World War ===
The Holocaust decimated the Jewish population in Belarus, and after World War II, in 1959, Jews accounted for only 1.9% of the population. Since then, Jewish emigration to Israel and other countries reduced the number of Jews to 0.1% of the population (13,000 in 2009).

Polish minority districts in 1960: Over 50% Polish 40-50% 30-40% 10-30% Up to 10% Polish Border of Poland in 1939

After the war, a large number of Poles were forced to move to Poland. In exchange, Belarusians from the former Belastok Region, which was returned to Poland in 1945, after being occupied in 1939 were displaced to Belarus. Due to changes in the western border of Belarus and Poland after World War II (see territorial changes of Poland), the number of Poles in Belarus increased to more than 500,000 according to the first post-war census (1959) and to about 400,000 according to the 1999 census. Poles are now the third largest ethnic group in Belarus (see Polish minority in Belarus). There are around 15,000 of Lipka Tatars and about 10,000 of Ruska Roma (Russian Gypsies).

In the post-war period Belarus experienced an influx of workers from other parts of the Soviet Union, for example Russians and Ukrainians. The decade after independence saw a decline in the population of most of these minority groups, either by assimilation or emigration. The most significant exception to this trend has been a continued (if small-scale) net immigration of Armenians and Azerbaijanis, whose numbers increased from less than 2,000 in 1959 to around 10,000 in 1999.

Ethnic composition of Belarus according to 2019 census
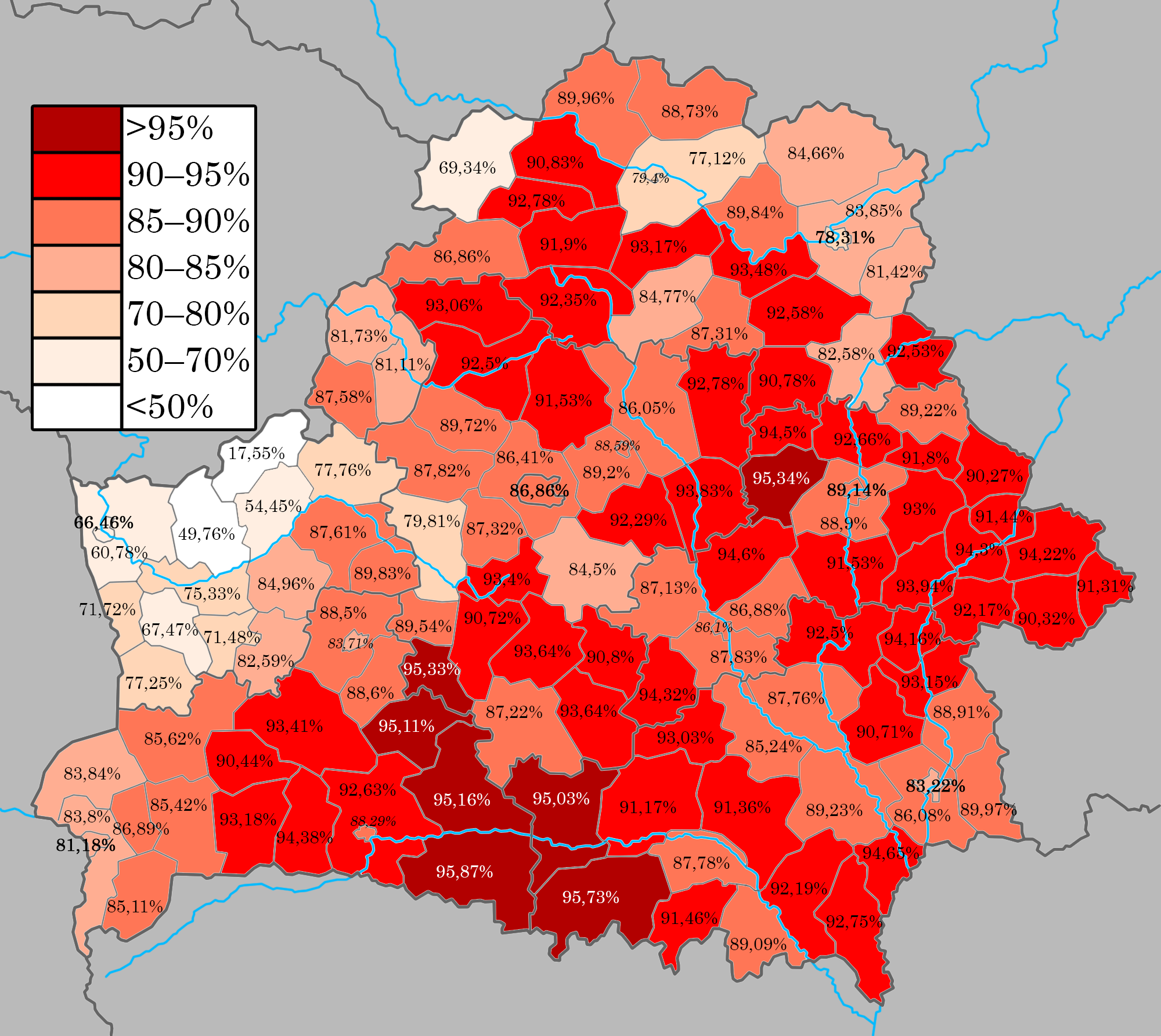
Belarusian

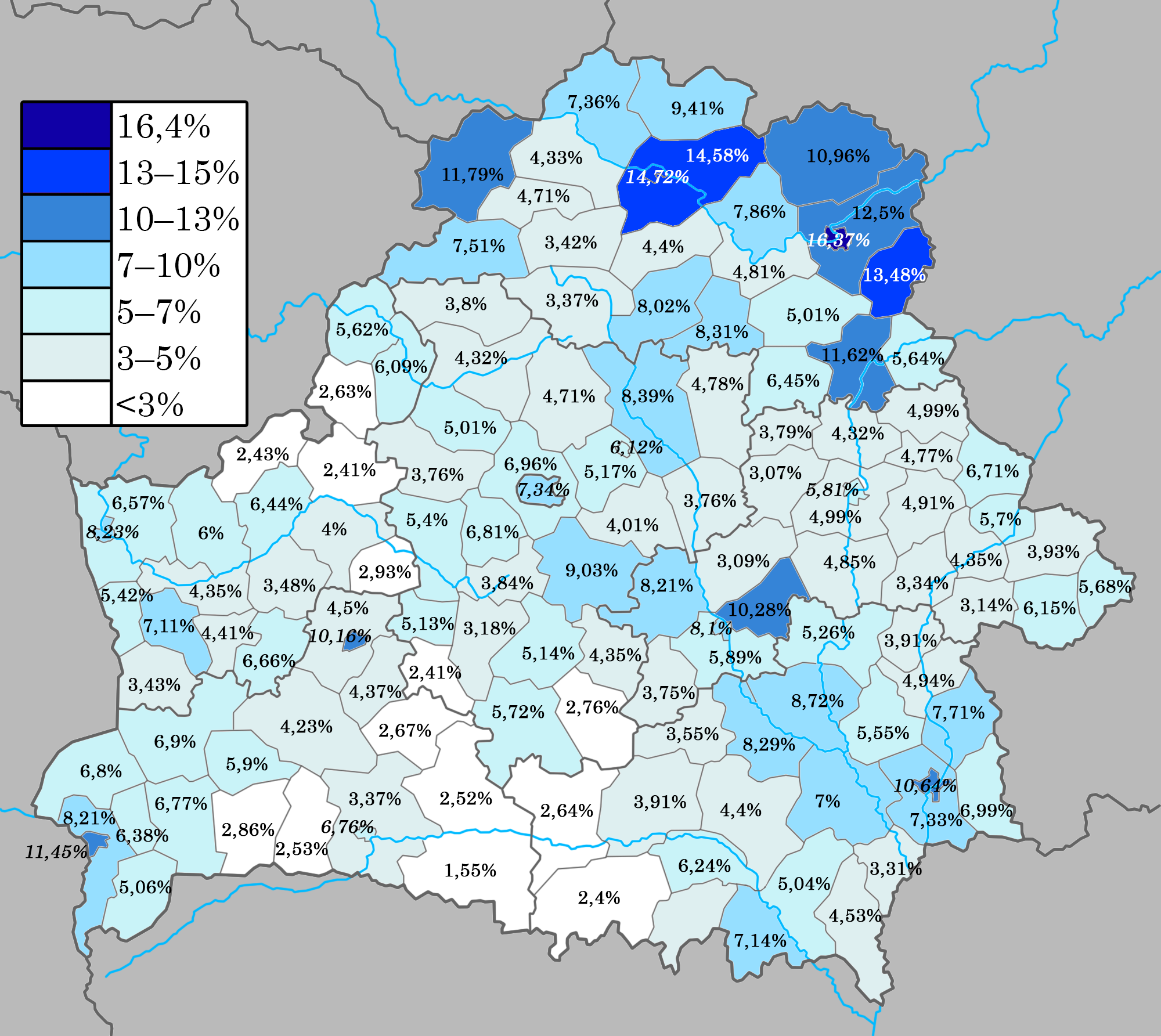
Russians

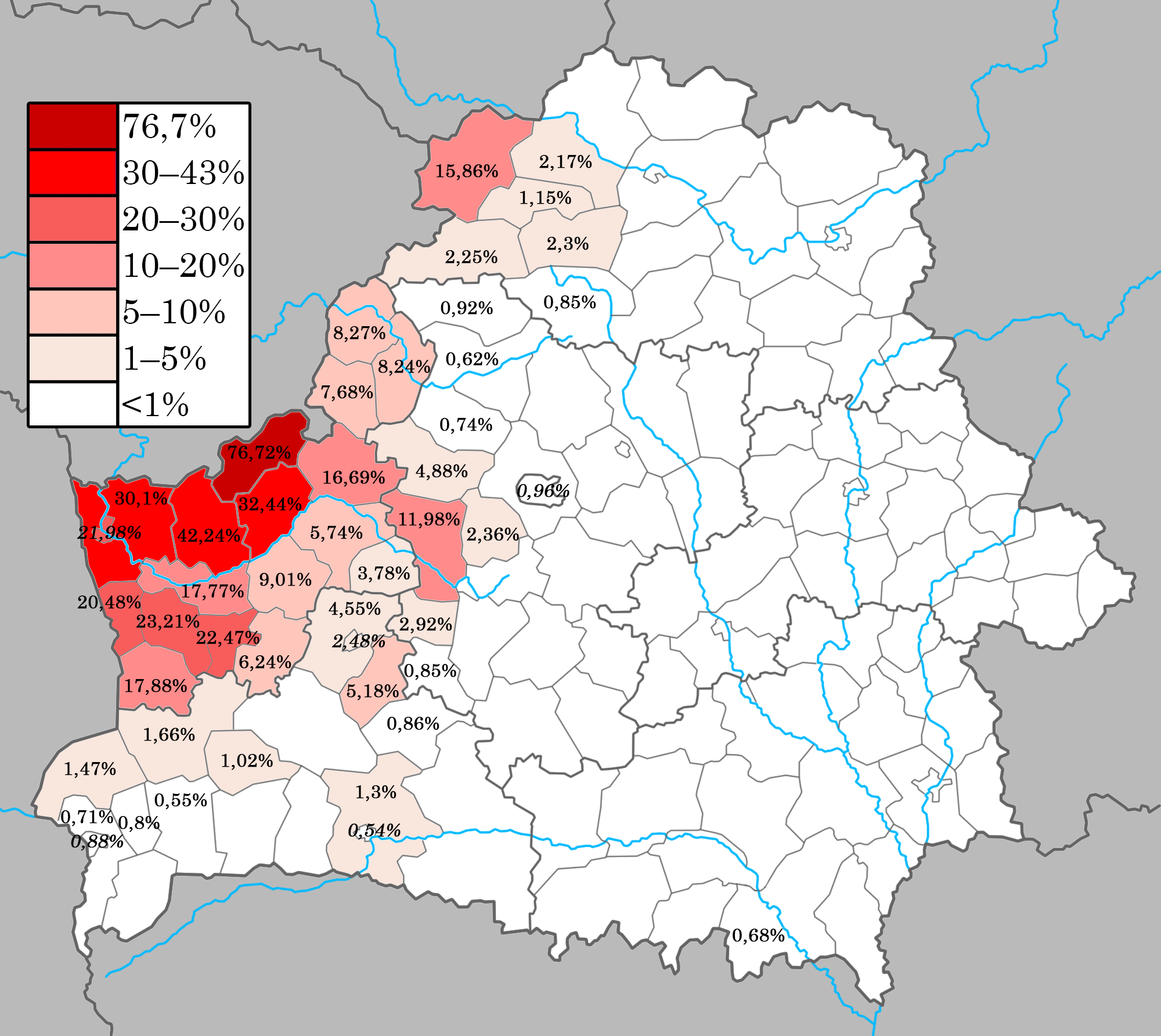
Poles

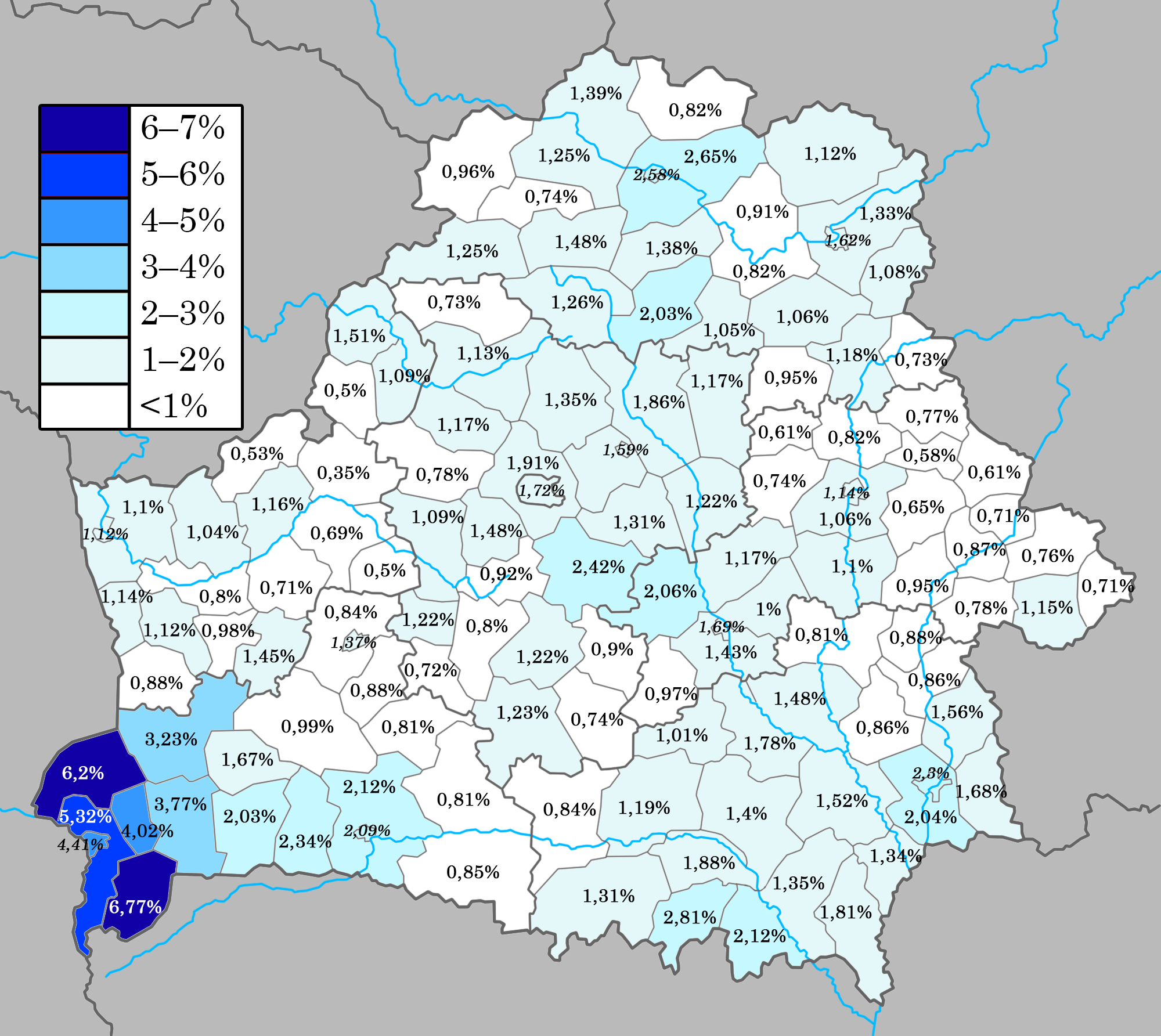
Ukrainians

Ethnic composition of Belarus according to 2009 census
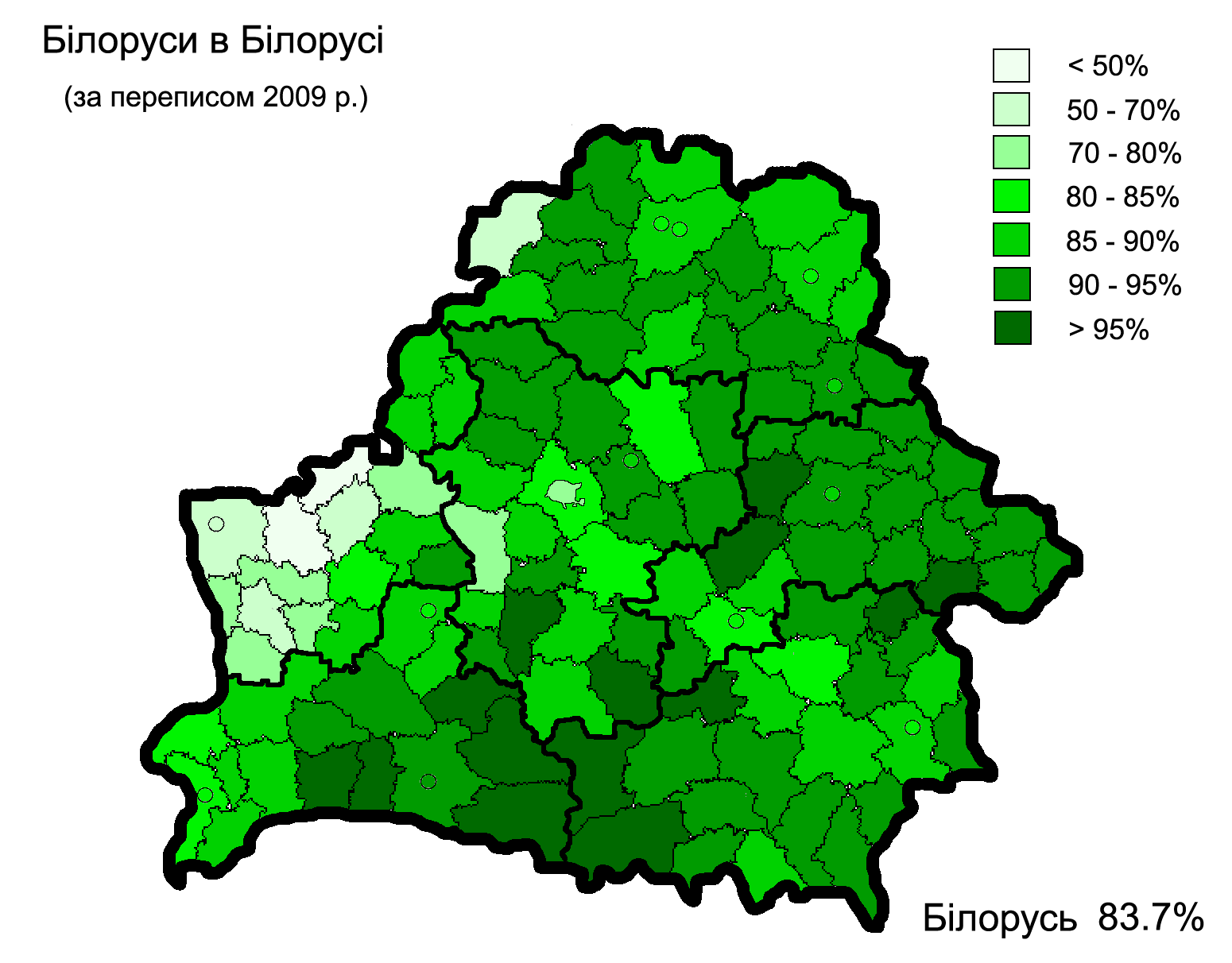
Belarusian

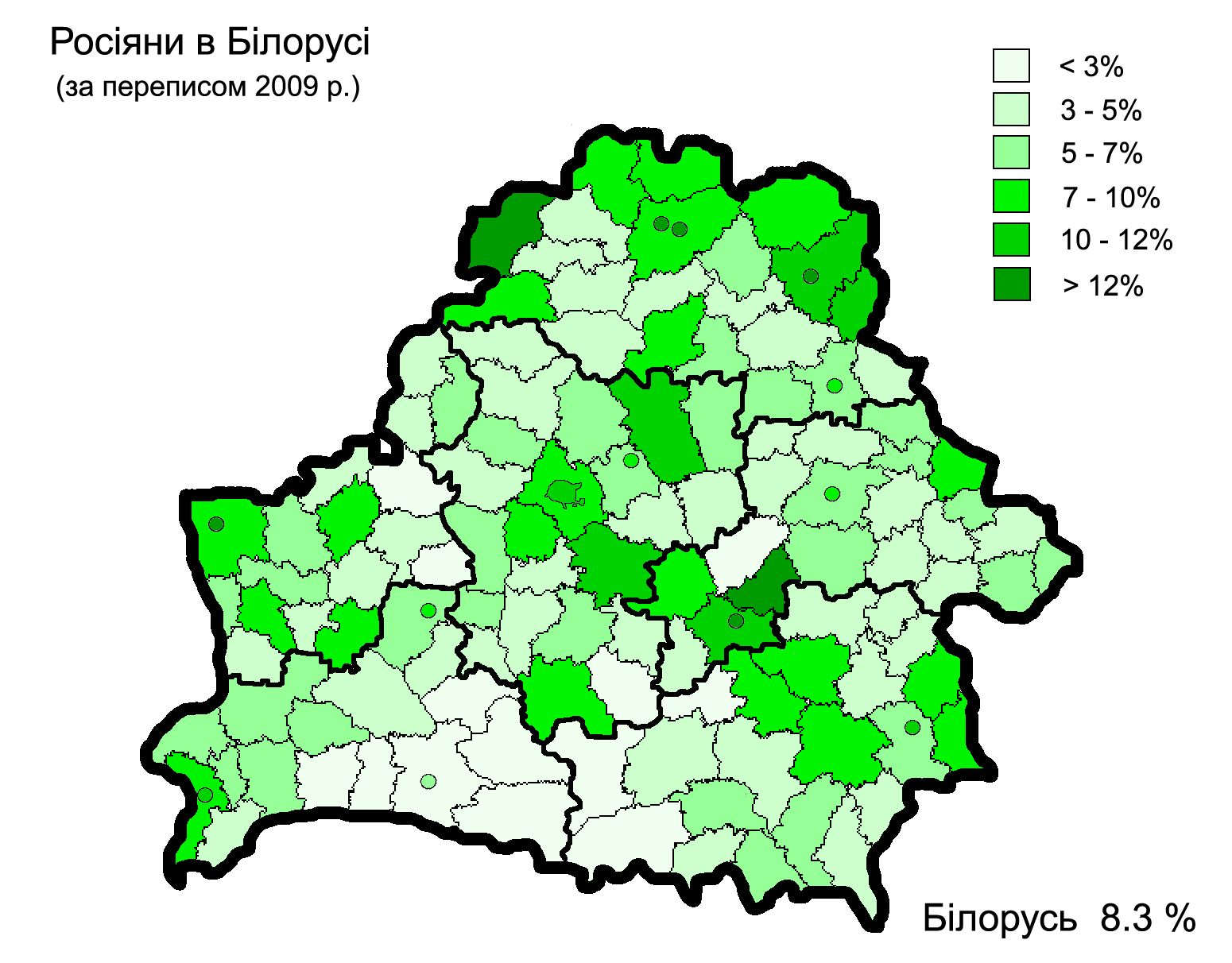
Russians

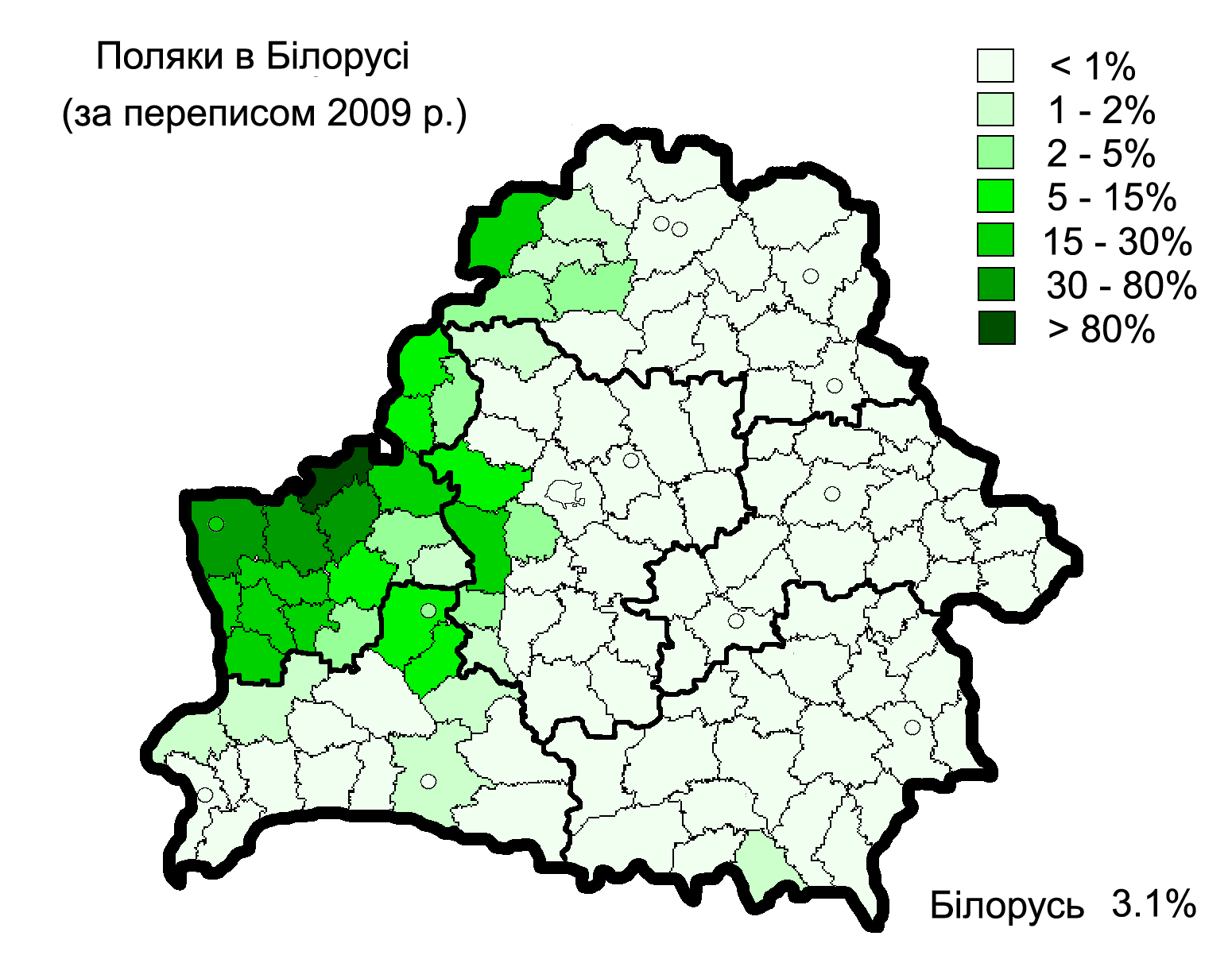
Poles

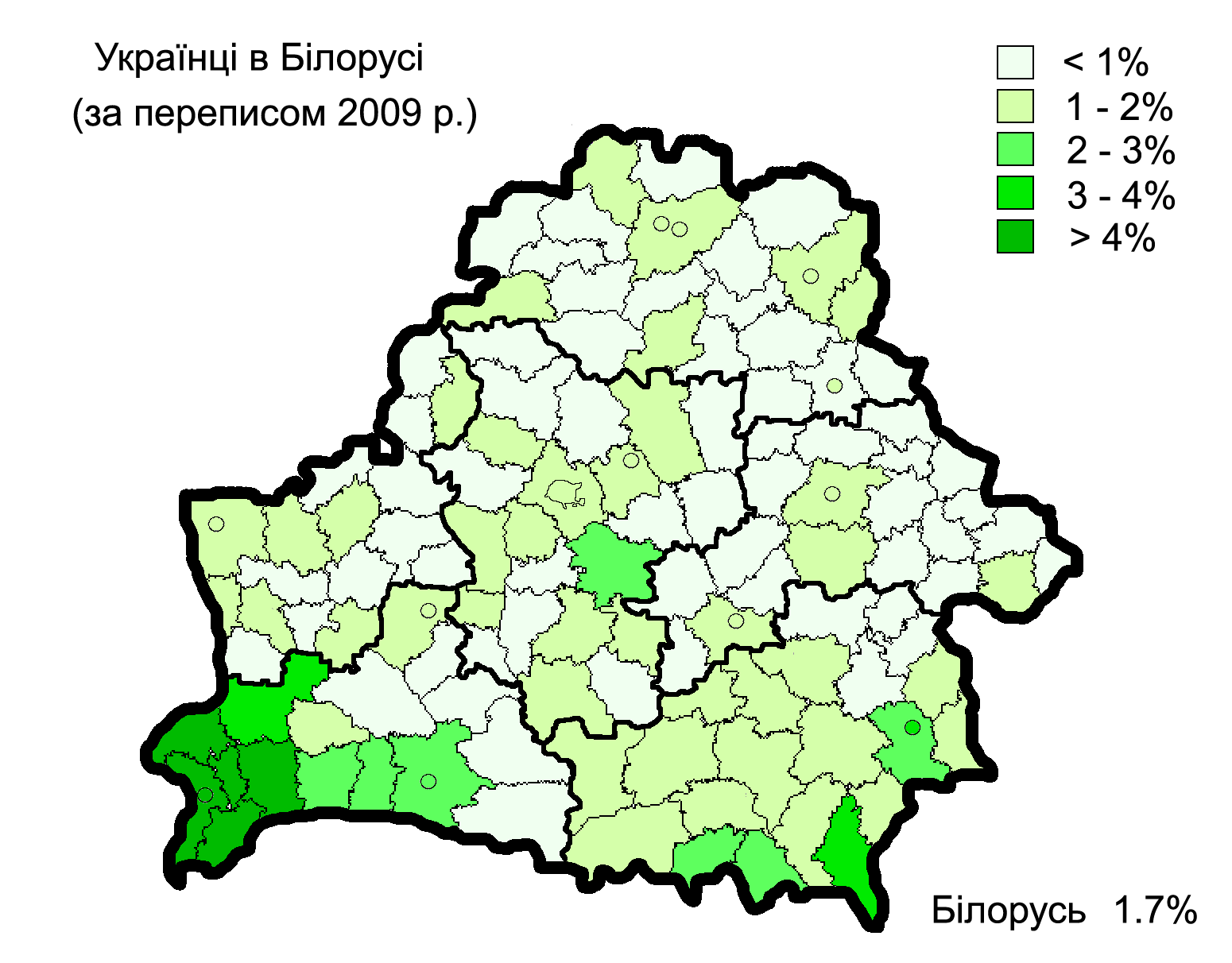
Ukrainians

Population of Belarus according to ethnic group 1959–2019
Ethnic group	census 1959^{1}		census 1970^{2}		census 1979^{3}		census 1989^{4}		census 1999^{5}		census 2009^{6}		census 2019^{7}	
Ethnic group	Number	%	Number	%	Number	%	Number	%	Number	%	Number	%	Number	%
Belarusians	6,532,035	81.1	7,289,610	81.0	7,567,955	79.4	7,904,623	77.9	8,158,900	81.2	7,957,252	83.7	7,990,719	84.9
Russians	659,093	8.2	938,161	10.4	1,134,117	11.9	1,342,099	13.2	1,141,700	11.4	785,084	8.3	706,992	7.5
Poles	538,881	6.7	382,600	4.3	403,169	4.2	417,720	4.1	395,700	3.9	294,549	3.1	287,693	3.1
Ukrainians	133,061	1.7	190,839	2.1	230,985	2.4	291,008	2.9	237,000	2.4	158,723	1.7	159,656	1.7
Jews	150,084	1.9	148,011	1.6	135,450	1.4	111,975	1.1	27,800	0.3	12,926	0.1	13,705	0.1
Armenians	1,751	0.0	2,362	0.0	2,751	0.0	4,933	0.1	10,200	0.1	8,512	0.1	9,392	0.1
Tatars	8,650	0.1	9,992	0.1	10,851	0.1	12,436	0.1	10,100	0.1	7,316	0.1	8,445	0.1
Romani	4,662	0.1	6,843	0.1	8,408	0.1	10,762	0.1	9,900	0.1	7,079	0.1	6,848	0.1
Azerbaijanis	1,402	0.0	1,335	0.0	2,654	0.0	5,009	0.1	6,300	0.1	5,567	0.1	6,001	0.1
Lithuanians	8,363	0.1	8,092	0.1	6,993	0.1	7,606	0.1	6,400	0.1	5,087	0.1	5,287	0.1
Others	16,666	0.2	24,493	0.3	29,183	0.3	43,635	0.4	41,200	0.4	261,712	2.8	218,708	2.3
Total	8,054,648		9,002,338		9,532,516		10,151,806		10,045,200		9,503,807		9,413,446	
^{1} Source: . ^{2} Source: . ^{3} Source: . ^{4} Source: . ^{5} Source: . ^{6} Source: . ^{7} Source:.

== Languages ==
Belarusian and Russian are the official languages according to the Constitution of Belarus (Article 17). The constitution guarantees preservation of the cultural heritage of all ethnic minorities, including their languages (Article 15). Russian, and not Belarusian, is the dominant language in Belarus, spoken normally at home by 71.3% of the population (2019 census). Major cities such as Minsk and Brest are overwhelmingly Russian-speaking.

Languages of Belarus according to 2009 census (green – Belarusian, blue – Russian)
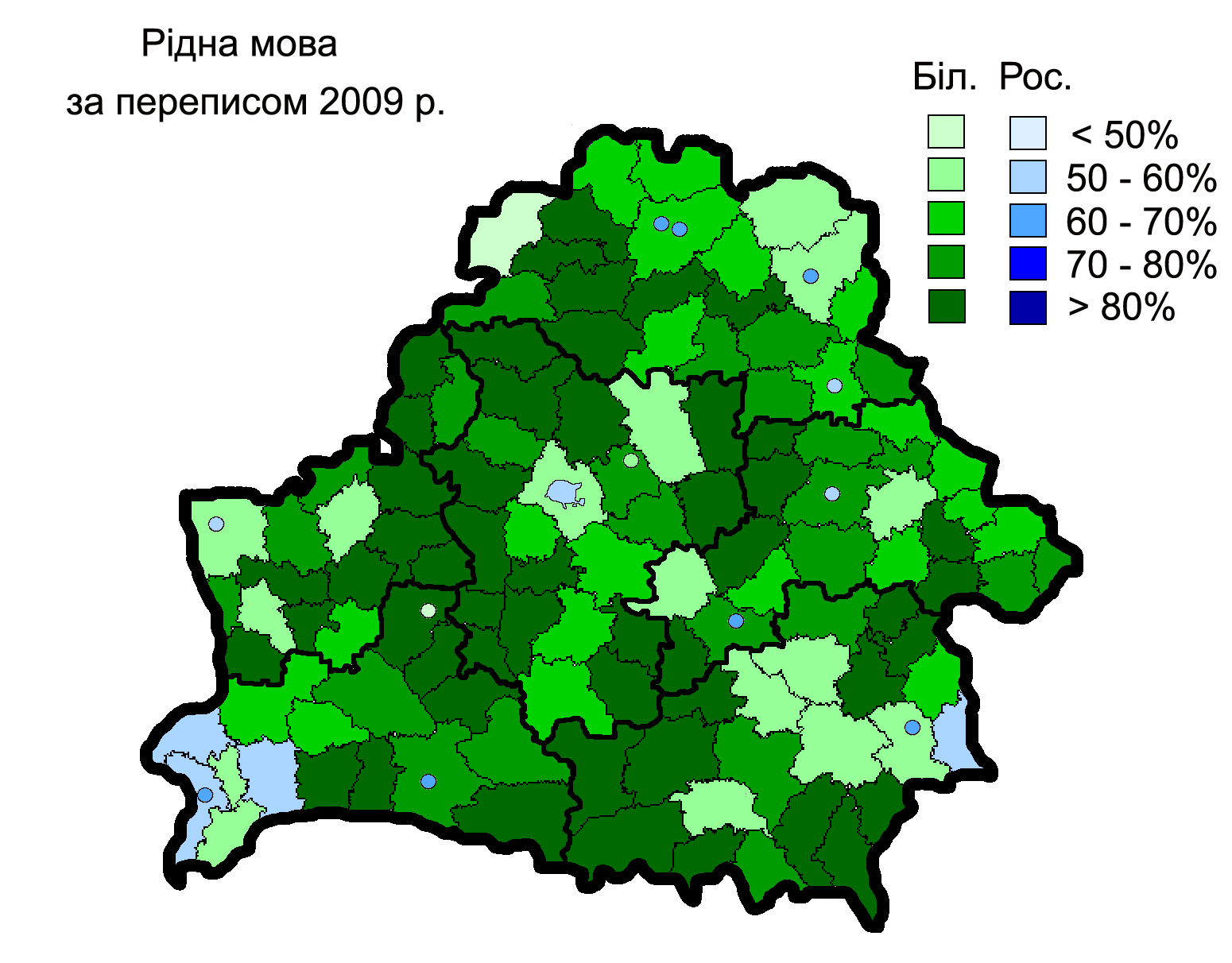
Native languages

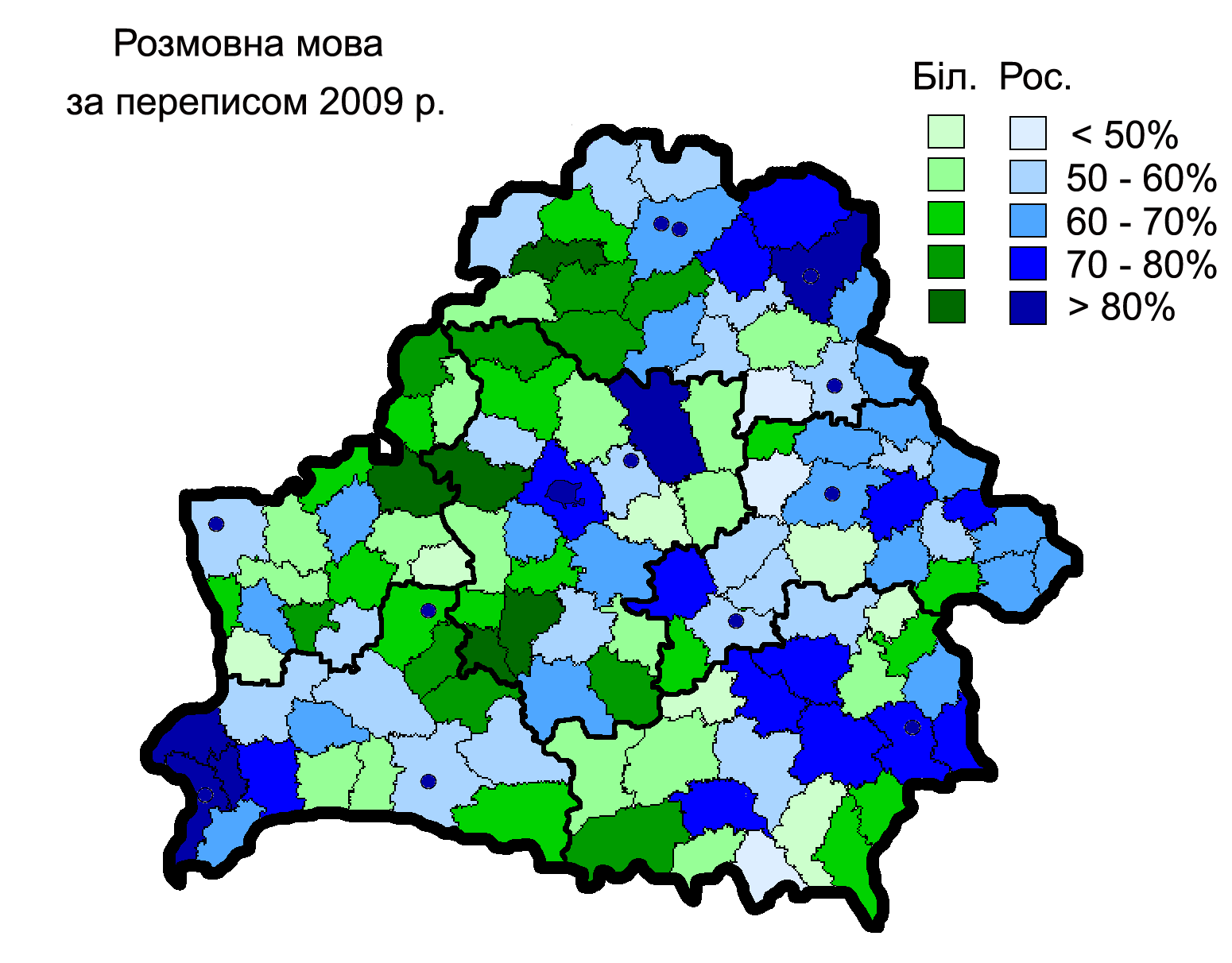
Spoken languages

== Religion ==
According to 1997 estimates, 80% of the religious population belonged to the Eastern Orthodox Church and the others are mainly Roman Catholic, Greek Catholic, Protestants, Muslims, and Jews.

Figures for 2020 state that 78% of the population have a Christian background (this includes 60% Orthodox and 10% Catholic). Of the rest, almost 22% are non-religious, with a very small number of Jews and Sunni Muslims.

== Urbanization ==
Urban population: 75% of total population (2011)
Rate of urbanization: 0.21% annual rate of change (2010–2015 est.)

== See also ==
- List of cities in Belarus
- Belarus Census (disambiguation)
