= Belarus Census =

Belarus Census may refer to the following Belarusian censuses:

- 1999 Belarusian census
- 2009 Belarusian census
- 2019 Belarusian census
