= Demographics of Brussels =

- Population pyramid of Brussels in 2022
- Population: 1,255,834 (2026)
- Density: 7,732/km²
- Growth rate: 0.73% (2025)
- Fertility rate: 1.36 children per woman (2023)

Nationality
- Major ethnic: 78% others
- Minor ethnic: 22% Belgians

Language
- Official: French, Dutch

The demographics of Brussels are monitored by Statistics Belgium. Brussels' population is currently 1,255,834 as of 2026.

== Population ==
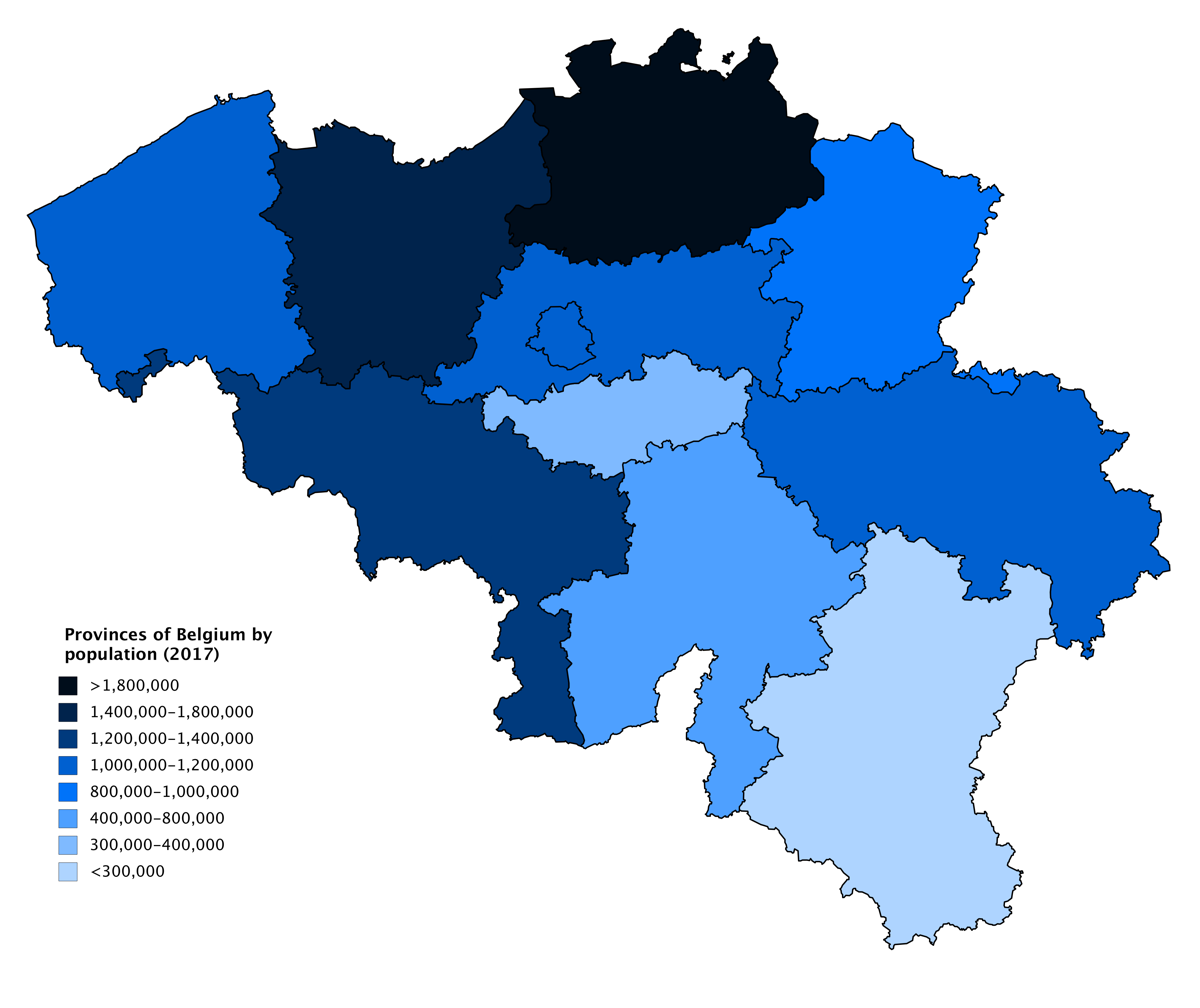
Belgium's population by provinces, 2017

The population of Brussels, officially the Brussels Capital Region, in 2026 was 1,255,834. In recent years, the city has witnessed a remarkable increase in its population. In general, the population of Brussels is younger than the national average, and the gap between rich and poor is wider.

=== Growth rate ===
In 2021, the population growth rate in Brussels was 0.22%.

=== Density ===
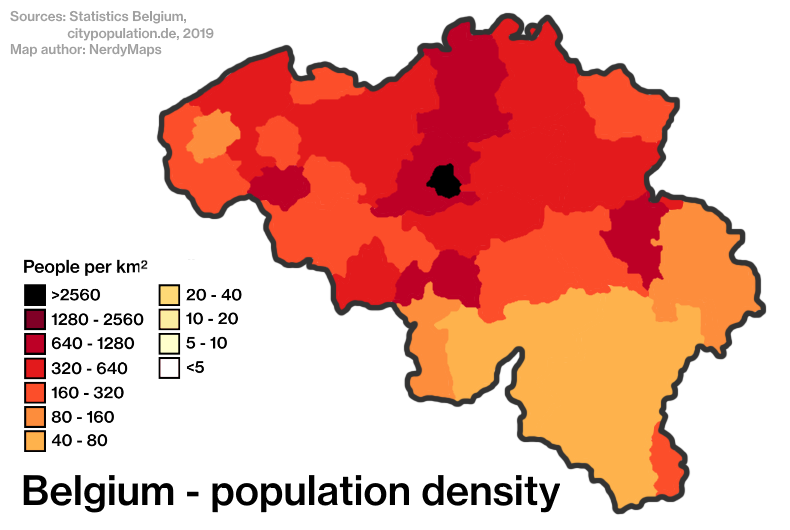
A map of Belgium's population density, 2019

The density of Brussels is high. Brussels is one of the most urbanised areas of Europe.

=== Life expectancy ===
In 2020, the life expectancy in Brussels was 79.61 years.

Life expectancy in Brussels	Years						
Life expectancy in Brussels	1996	2000	2005	2010	2015	2019	2020
Total	77.46	77.94	79.04	79.7	80.86	81.59	79.61
Men	73.96	74.62	75.99	76.92	78.11	79.08	76.93
Women	80.54	80.89	81.76	82.73	83.36	83.86	82.19

=== Fertility ===
The total fertility rate within Brussels in 2019 was 1.7 children per woman.

Total fertility rate within Brussels	Year										
Total fertility rate within Brussels	1971	1976	1981	1986	1991	1996	2001	2006	2011	2016	2019
Total fertility rate within Brussels	1.98	1.66	1.71	1.76	1.8	1.79	2.03	2.11	1.96	1.82	1.7

The total number of births in Brussels is declining.

Total number of births in Brussels	Year				
Total number of births in Brussels	2017	2018	2019	2020	2021
Births	17,709	17,377	16,854	15,847	15,690

==== Age of first birth and childbearing ====
The average age of which a mother gives birth has been consistently rising since figures go back to 1998

Age of motherhood	Year											
Age of motherhood	1998	2000	2002	2004	2006	2008	2010	2012	2014	2016	2018	2019
First birth	26.8	28	28	28.4	28.6	28.7	29.1	29.2	29.8	30.1	30.2	30.5
Average age of childbearing overall	29.5	29.7	29.7	30	30.2	30.5	30.7	31	31.4	31.6	31.9	32.1

=== Age ===
The population of Belgian and non-Belgian nationals in the Brussels Capital Region in 2022

The average age of Brussels is much lower than on average the rest of Belgium.

Brussels	2022		
Brussels	Less the 18 years	18 to 64	65 years or more
Population	273,645	788,876	160,116

== Language ==
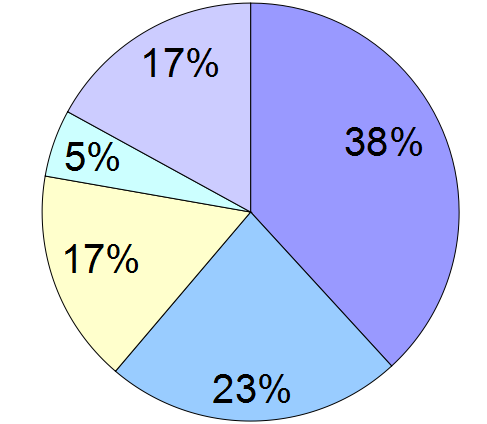
Languages spoken at home in the Brussels-Capital Region (2013) French Dutch and French Dutch French and other language Neither Dutch nor French

Today, the Brussels-Capital Region is legally bilingual, with both French and Dutch having official status, as is the administration of the 19 municipalities.

Owing to migration and to its international role, Brussels is home to a large number of native speakers of languages other than French or Dutch. In 2020, about half of the population spoke a home language other than French or Dutch. In 2013, approximately 17% of families spoke none of the official languages in the home. In 23% of familes, a foreign language was used alongside French. The share of unilingual French-speaking families was 38%. 5% of families spoke only Dutch. The percentage of bilingual Dutch-French families was 17%.

In 2013, French was spoken "well to perfectly" by 88% of the population. For Dutch, this percentage was 23%, down from 33% in 2000. The other most commonly known languages were English (30%), Arabic (18%), Spanish (9%), German (7%) and Italian and Turkish (5% each).

Despite the rise of English as a second language in Brussels, including as an unofficial compromise language between French and Dutch, and the working language for some of its international businesses and institutions, French remains the lingua franca. All public services are conducted exclusively in French or Dutch.

== Religion ==
Religions in the Brussels-Capital Region (2016)
1. Roman Catholicism (40.0%)
2. Islam (23.0%)
3. Protestantism (3.00%)
4. Other religions (4.00%)
5. Non-religious (30.0%)

Historically, Brussels has been predominantly Roman Catholic, especially since the expulsion of Protestants in the 16th century. This is clear from the large number of historical churches in the region, particularly in the City of Brussels. The pre-eminent Catholic cathedral in Brussels is the Cathedral of St. Michael and St. Gudula, serving as the co-cathedral of the Archdiocese of Mechelen–Brussels. On the north-western side of the region, the National Basilica of the Sacred Heart is a Minor Basilica and parish church, as well as the 14th largest church building in the world. The Church of Our Lady of Laeken holds the tombs of many members of the Belgian royal family, including all the former Belgian monarchs, within the Royal Crypt.

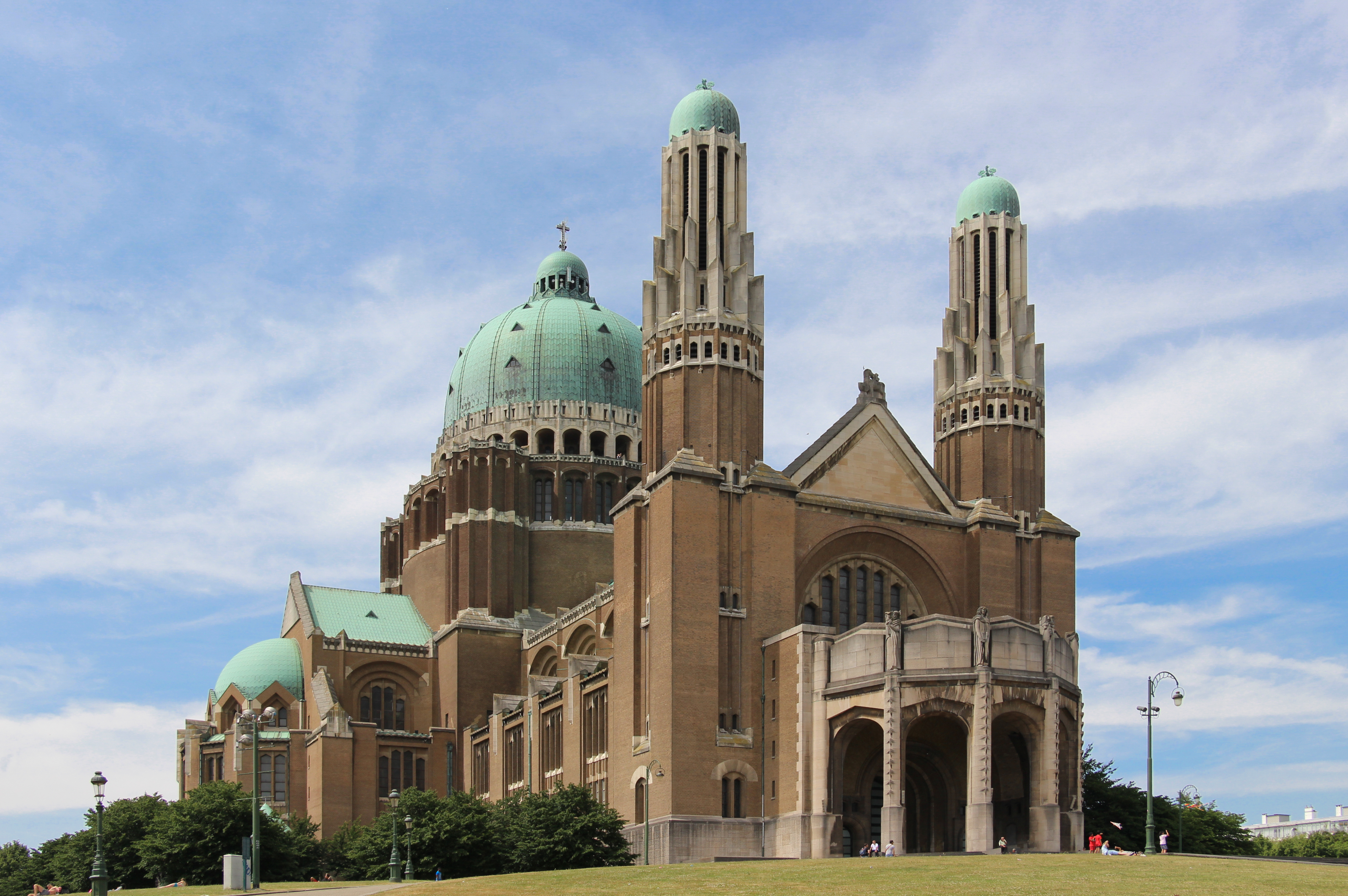
The National Basilica of the Sacred Heart in Koekelberg

In reflection of its multicultural makeup, Brussels hosts a variety of religious communities, and large numbers of atheists and agnostics. Minority faiths include Islam, Anglicanism, Eastern Orthodoxy, Judaism, and Buddhism. In 2016, approximately 40% of Brussels residents identified as Catholics (12% practicing and 28% non-practicing), 30% as non-religious, 23% as Muslim (19% practicing and 3% non-practicing), 3% as Protestants (2% born-again, primarily Pentecostals and some Evangelicals, and 1% from mainline Protestantism), and 4% adhered to other religions. Among born-again Protestants, 93% were practicing (98% of Pentecostals and 86% of Evangelicals), whereas only 29% of mainline Protestants were practicing Christians, with 71% non-practicing.

As guaranteed by Belgian law, recognised religions and non-religious philosophical organisations (French: organisations laïques, Dutch: vrijzinnige levensbeschouwelijke organisaties) enjoy public funding and school courses. It was once the case that every pupil in an official school from 6 years old to 18 had to choose 2 hours per week of compulsory religious—or non-religious-inspired morals—courses. In 2015, the Belgian Constitutional Court ruled religious studies could no longer be required in the primary and secondary educational systems.

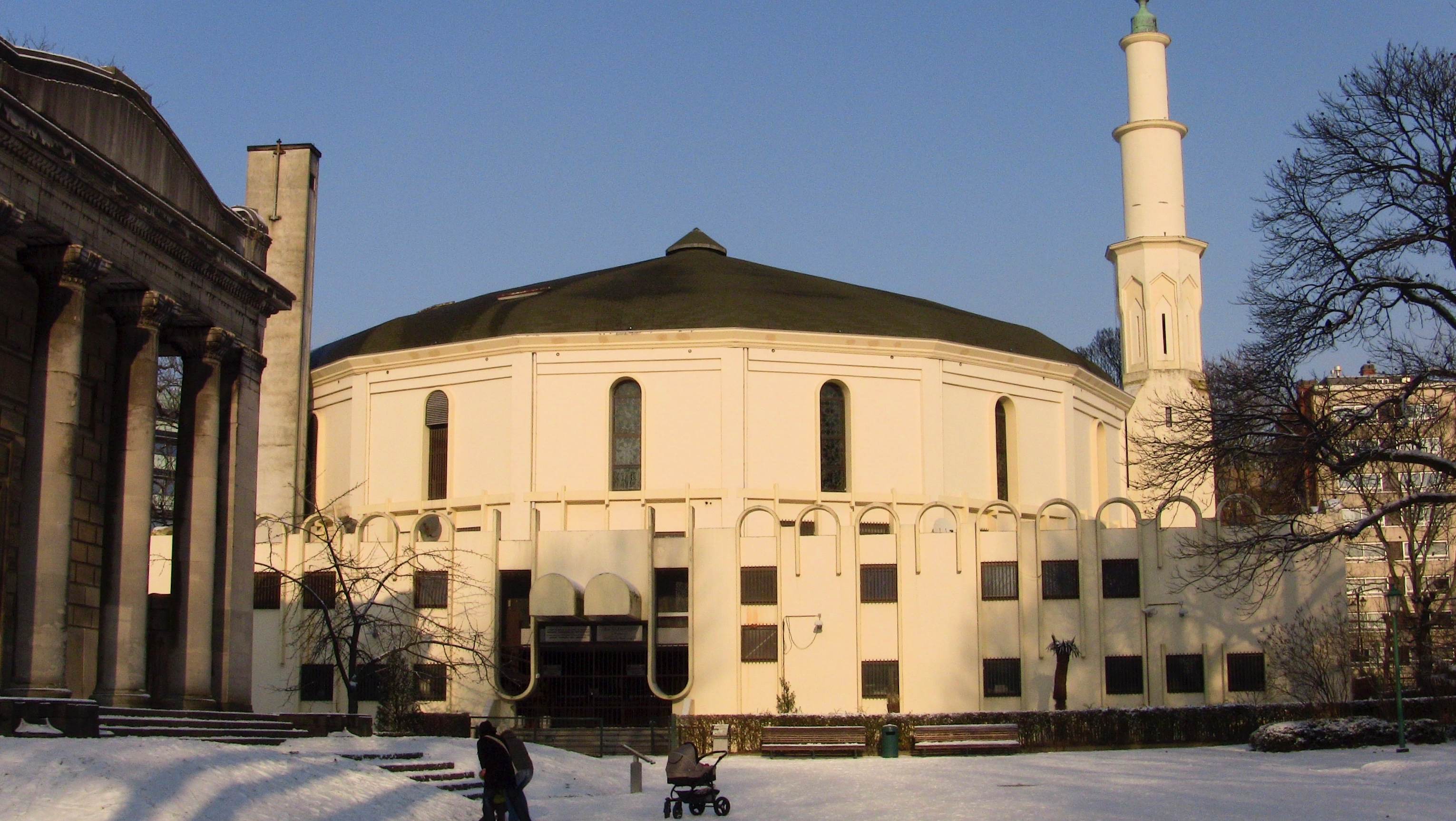
The Great Mosque of Brussels, former seat of the Islamic and Cultural Centre of Belgium

Brussels has a large concentration of Muslims, mostly of Moroccan, Syrian and Iraqi ancestry. The Great Mosque of Brussels, located in the Parc du Cinquantenaire/Jubelpark, is the oldest mosque in Brussels. Belgium does not collect statistics by ethnic background or religious beliefs, so exact figures are unknown. It was estimated that, in 2005, people of Muslim background living in the Brussels Region numbered 256,220 and accounted for 25.5% of the city's population, a much higher concentration than those of the other regions of Belgium.

== Origin ==
Belgians of Belgian origin by percentage in the Brussels-Capital Region

Belgium does not collect ethnic data of its citizens but does have a unique classification on the status of where its citizens originate from. This classification is not based on the place of birth, but takes into account previous nationalities of the person and of their parents.

According to Statistics Belgium in 2026, 21,5% of the residents of Brussels were of Belgian origin (i.e., the resident had no previous nationality other than Belgian and both of their parents have the Belgian nationality as first nationality), and 78,5% were of overall foreign origin. Of these foreign origin residents, 38,3% were of non-European origin (28,8% were of African origin) and 37,1% of European origin.

The Belgian background by age group was 10.5% among those under 18, 18.9% among 18-64-year-olds and 51.5% among those aged 65 and over. In 2020, among those aged under 18, 83,9% had at least one parent of non-Belgian origin and of those 60,1% of non-European origin (including 37% of African origin).

Group of origin	Year											
Group of origin	2001		2006		2011		2016		2021		2026	
Group of origin	Number	%	Number	%	Number	%	Number	%	Number	%	Number	%
Belgians with Belgian background	486,864	50.5%	433,338	42.5%	385,436	34.4%	342,026	28.8%	304,994	25.0%	270,149	21.5%
Belgians with foreign background (Note: The number includes Belgian nationals who either previously were foreign nationals themselves or at least one of their parents was a foreign national.)	214,770	22.3%	311,773	30.6%	381,308	34.1%	434,789	36.6%	482,279	39.5%	524,530	41.8%
Neighbouring country (Note: This category includes; Germany; France; Luxembourg; the Netherlands; the United Kingdom;)	27,024	2.8%	28,386	2.8%	30,215	2.7%	32,463	2.7%	36,428	3%	40,359	3.2%
Other EU	34,211	3.5%	38,468	3.8%	42,395	3.8%	47,531	4%	53,963	4.4%	60,298	4.8%
Other Europe	25,505	2.6%	39,154	3.8%	46,513	4.2%	50,384	4.2%	52,050	4.3%	50,194	4%
Africa	97,066	10.1%	162,093	15.9%	207,671	18.6%	243,582	20.5%	270,551	22.2%	286,016	22.8%
Asia and Oceania	15,969	1.7%	21,813	2.1%	27,663	2.5%	31,279	2.6%	35,539	2.9%	43,752	3.5%
Latin America and the Caribbean	4,145	0.4%	7,173	0,7%	9,701	0.9%	11,133	0.9%	13,807	1.1%	15,369	1.2%
North America	874	0.1%	1,156	0.1%	1,396	0.1%	1,604	0.1%	1,900	0.2%	2,253	0.2%
Not classified	9,976	1%	13,530	1.3%	15,754	1.4%	16,813	1.4%	18,041	1.5%	26,289	2.1%
Non-Belgians	262,771	27.2%	273,693	26.9%	352,344	31.5%	411,075	34.6%	432,697	35.5%	461,155	36.7%
Neighbouring country (Note: This category includes; Germany; France; Luxembourg; the Netherlands; the United Kingdom;)	55,613	5.8%	62,721	6.2%	76,482	6.8%	85,953	7.2%	89,748	7.4%	91,209	7.3%
Other EU	87,602	9.1%	97,320	9.5%	136,090	12.2%	173,082	14.6%	182,496	15%	183,311	14.6%
Other Europe	20,095	2.1%	17,798	1.7%	21,337	1.9%	21,326	1.8%	22,411	1.8%	39,925	3.2%
Africa	75,438	7.8%	65,023	6.4%	78,472	7%	82,231	6.9%	78,169	6.4%	75,155	6%
Asia and Oceania	12,155	1.3%	15,951	1.6%	19,800	1.8%	26,288	2.2%	36,381	3%	40,837	3.2%
Latin America and the Caribbean	3,734	0.4%	5,816	0.6%	9,818	0.9%	11,181	0.9%	11,755	1%	14,494	1.1%
North America	3,820	0.4%	3,979	0.4%	4,417	0.4%	4,530	0.4%	4,102	0.3%	3,910	0.3%
Not classified	4,314	0.4%	5,085	0.5%	5,928	0.5%	6,484	0.5%	7,635	0.6%	12,314	1%
Total	964,405	100%	1,018,804	100%	1,119,088	100%	1,187,890	100%	1,219,970	100%	1,255,834	100%
