= Demographics of Belgium =

Demographics of the Kingdom of Belgium
- Population pyramid of Belgium in 2022
- Population: 11,763,650 (January 2024) 82nd
- Growth rate: 0.54% (2021 est.)
- Birth rate: 9.4 births/1,000 population (2023)
- Death rate: 9.8 deaths/1,000 population (2021)
- Life expectancy: 82.28 years (2023 est.)
  - male: 80.18 years (2023)
  - female: 84.30 years (2023)
- Fertility rate: ▼1.47 children born/woman (2023)
- Infant mortality: 3.24 (2021 est.)
- Immigrant share: 20.0% (2024)

Age structure
- 0–14 years: 16.1% (male 857,373/female 822,303)
- 15–64 years: 66.3% (male 3,480,072/female 3,419,721)
- 65 and over: 17.6% (male 760,390/female 1,074,477) (2009 est.)

Sex ratio
- Total: 0.96 male(s)/female
- At birth: 1.04 male(s)/female (2009 est.)
- Under 15: 1.04 male(s)/female
- 15–64 years: 1.02 male(s)/female
- 65 and over: 0.72 male(s)/female

Nationality
- Nationality: noun: Belgian(s) adjective: Belgian
- Major ethnic: 64% Belgians; 37.1% Flemish; 20.1% Walloon; 6.8% Brussels residents
- Minor ethnic: Italians (4.2%), Moroccans (3.7%), French people (3.2%), Turkish people (2.0%), Dutch people (1.9%), Arabs (1.9%), Romanians (1.7%), Poles (1.5%), Spaniards (1.3%), Germans (1.2%), Congolese (1.2%), Portuguese people (1.1%), Syrians (1%), Afghans (0.9%), Ukrainians (0.8%)

Language
- Official: Dutch, French, German

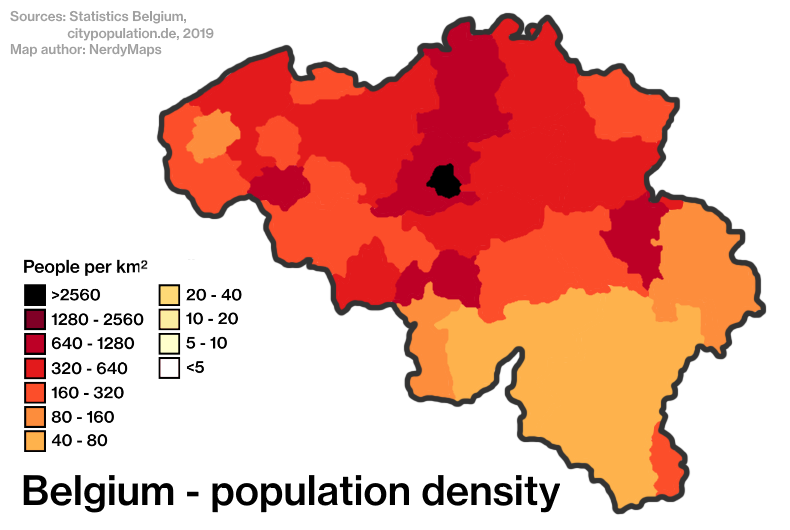
Population density in Belgium by arrondissement

Demographic features of the population of Belgium include ethnicity, education level, health of the populace, economic status, religious affiliations and other aspects. All figures are from the National Institute for Statistics unless otherwise indicated.

== Population ==
Historical population
Year	Pop.	±% p.a.
1000	400,000	—
1100	600,000	+0.41%
1200	900,000	+0.41%
1300	1,250,000	+0.33%
1400	800,000	−0.45%
1500	1,250,000	+0.45%
1600	1,500,000	+0.18%
1700	1,750,000	+0.15%
1800	3,500,000	+0.70%
1846	4,337,196	+0.47%
1856	4,529,460	+0.43%
1866	4,827,833	+0.64%
1876	5,336,185	+1.01%
1880	5,520,009	+0.85%
1890	6,069,321	+0.95%
1900	6,693,548	+0.98%
1910	7,423,784	+1.04%
1920	7,465,782	+0.06%
1930	8,092,004	+0.81%
1947	8,512,195	+0.30%
1961	9,189,741	+0.55%
1970	9,650,944	+0.55%
1981	9,848,647	+0.18%
1991	9,978,681	+0.13%
2001	10,296,350	+0.31%
2011	11,000,638	+0.66%
2021	11,521,238	+0.46%
Source: Our World in Data Statistics Belgium, 2018

In January 2024, Belgium had a population of 11,763,650 and is the 81st most populous country in the world. The population of Flanders, Wallonia and Brussels in January 2024 was 6,821,770 (58.0% of Belgium), 3,692,283 (31.4% of Belgium) and 1,249,597 (10.6% of Belgium), respectively.

The population density of Belgium was 383/km^{2} (990/sq mi) in January 2024, making it the 38th most densely populated country in the world, and the 7th most densely populated country in Europe. The most densely populated province is Antwerp, the least densely populated province is Luxembourg.

In January 2020, Belgium had a population of 11,492,641, as compared to 2010 (10,839,905 people) an increase of about 653,000. 2010 compared to 2000 (10,239,085 people), an increase of about 601,000 people. 2000 compared to 1990 (9,947,782 people), an increase of about 291,000 people.

The following demographic statistics are from the World Population Review in 2019.

Belgium's population, 1000 to 2021

- One birth every 4 minutes
- One death every 5 minutes
- One net migrant every 12 minutes
- Net gain of one person every 9 minutes

View source data.
View source data.
View source data.
View source data.

=== Fertility ===
The total fertility rate (TFR) gradually increased during the last decade from 1.60 in 1997, 1.65 in 2002 and 1.82 in 2007. The rates in Brussels are higher than the national average (1.79 in 1997, 1.93 in 2002 and 2.09 in 2007), while they are below the average in Flanders (1.54 in 1997, 1.56 in 2002 and 1.77 in 2007), due to the higher percentage of non-European immigrants with higher birth rates in Brussels.

The total fertility rate is the number of children born per woman. It is based on fairly good data for the entire period. Sources: Our World In Data and Gapminder Foundation.

Years	1830	1831	1832	1833	1834	1835	1836	1837	1838	1839	1840
Total Fertility Rate in Belgium	4.72	4.77	4.82	4.87	4.92	4.97	4.97	4.98	4.98	4.99	5

Years	1841	1842	1843	1844	1845	1846	1847	1848	1849	1850
Total Fertility Rate in Belgium	4.94	4.88	4.82	4.76	4.7	4.64	4.58	4.51	4.45	4.38

Years	1851	1852	1853	1854	1855	1856	1857	1858	1859	1860
Total Fertility Rate in Belgium	4.32	4.25	4.18	4.25	4.31	4.38	4.44	4.51	4.53	4.56

Years	1861	1862	1863	1864	1865	1866	1867	1868	1869	1870
Total Fertility Rate in Belgium	4.58	4.61	4.63	4.66	4.68	4.71	4.73	4.76	4.78	4.8

Years	1871	1872	1873	1874	1875	1876	1877	1878	1879	1880
Total Fertility Rate in Belgium	4.83	4.85	4.87	4.85	4.83	4.82	4.8	4.78	4.75	4.71

Years	1881	1882	1883	1884	1885	1886	1887	1888	1889	1890
Total Fertility Rate in Belgium	4.68	4.64	4.61	4.55	4.49	4.42	4.36	4.3	4.27	4.25

Years	1891	1892	1893	1894	1895	1896	1897	1898	1899
Total Fertility Rate in Belgium	4.22	4.2	4.17	4.13	4.09	4.06	4.02	3.98	3.91

Total fertility rate; 1.71 children born/woman (2021 est.) Country comparison to the world: 160th

Birth rate; 11.03 births/1,000 population (2021 est.) Country comparison to the world: 175th

Mother's mean age at first birth; 29 years (2018 est.)

=== Life expectancy ===
According to estimation of the Statistics Belgium (Statbel), life expectancy at birth in Belgium in 2023 was 82.28 years (80.18 years for male and 84.30 years for female).

According to alternative estimation of the World Bank Group, in 2023 life expectancy in Belgium was 82.4 years (80.3 for male, 84.6 for female).

Estimation of the United Nations for 2023: 82.11 years total (79.86 for male, 84.33 for female).

Estimation of Eurostat for 2023: 82.5 years total (80.4 for male, 84.5 for female).

According to estimation of the WHO for 2019, at that year life expectancy in Belgium was 81.4 years (79.3 years for male and 83.5 years for female). And healthy life expectancy was 70.6 years (69.8 years for male and 71.3 years for female).

In 2021–2023 period, the difference in life expectancy between the most prosperous and disadvantaged provinces was 4.09 years. In 2020–2022, this difference was 4.23 years.

==== Statistics by province ====
Belgium is administratively divided into 3 regions: Flemish Region, Walloon Region and a separate Brussels Capital Region. Flemish and Walloon regions are divided into five provinces each. The table below contains average values for 3-year periods. The values are rounded, all calculations were done on raw data. By default, the table is sorted by the 2022-2024 period.
Data source: Statistics Belgium

Administrative division of Belgium

province or region	2020–2022				change 1	2021–2023				change 2	2022–2024			
province or region	overall	male	female	F Δ M	change 1	overall	male	female	F Δ M	change 2	overall	male	female	F Δ M
Belgium on average	81.38	79.10	83.62	4.52	0.50	81.87	79.66	84.04	4.38	—	—	—	—	—
Limburg	82.46	80.53	84.41	3.88	0.37	82.83	80.92	84.74	3.83	0.98	83.81	82.04	85.54	3.51
Flemish Brabant	82.93	80.81	84.99	4.18	0.44	83.37	81.29	85.37	4.08	0.28	83.65	81.72	85.50	3.78
East Flanders	82.19	79.99	84.36	4.37	0.31	82.50	80.34	84.62	4.28	0.61	83.11	81.09	85.06	3.97
Antwerp	82.34	80.44	84.23	3.79	0.46	82.80	80.95	84.60	3.65	0.29	83.09	81.33	84.81	3.48
West Flanders	82.29	80.04	84.57	4.53	0.40	82.69	80.48	84.91	4.44	0.29	82.98	80.88	85.07	4.19
Walloon Brabant	82.48	80.28	84.52	4.25	0.44	82.92	80.74	84.93	4.19	0.05	82.97	80.83	84.93	4.10
Brussels	80.82	78.19	83.27	5.08	0.86	81.68	79.13	84.01	4.88	0.29	81.97	79.51	84.21	4.70
Belgian Luxembourg	80.07	77.56	82.67	5.11	0.25	80.32	77.78	82.91	5.14	0.32	80.63	78.26	83.05	4.79
Namur	79.78	77.17	82.39	5.22	0.52	80.30	77.87	82.66	4.79	0.32	80.62	78.34	82.82	4.48
Liège	79.49	77.13	81.83	4.71	0.75	80.24	77.99	82.42	4.44	0.23	80.47	78.37	82.50	4.13
Hainaut	78.70	75.87	81.48	5.61	0.58	79.28	76.48	82.00	5.52	0.35	79.63	76.90	82.29	5.39
Flanders on average	82.43	80.35	84.50	4.15	0.39	82.82	80.78	84.83	4.05	—	—	—	—	—
Wallonia on average	79.61	77.04	82.14	5.11	0.57	80.18	77.68	82.61	—	—	—	—	—	—

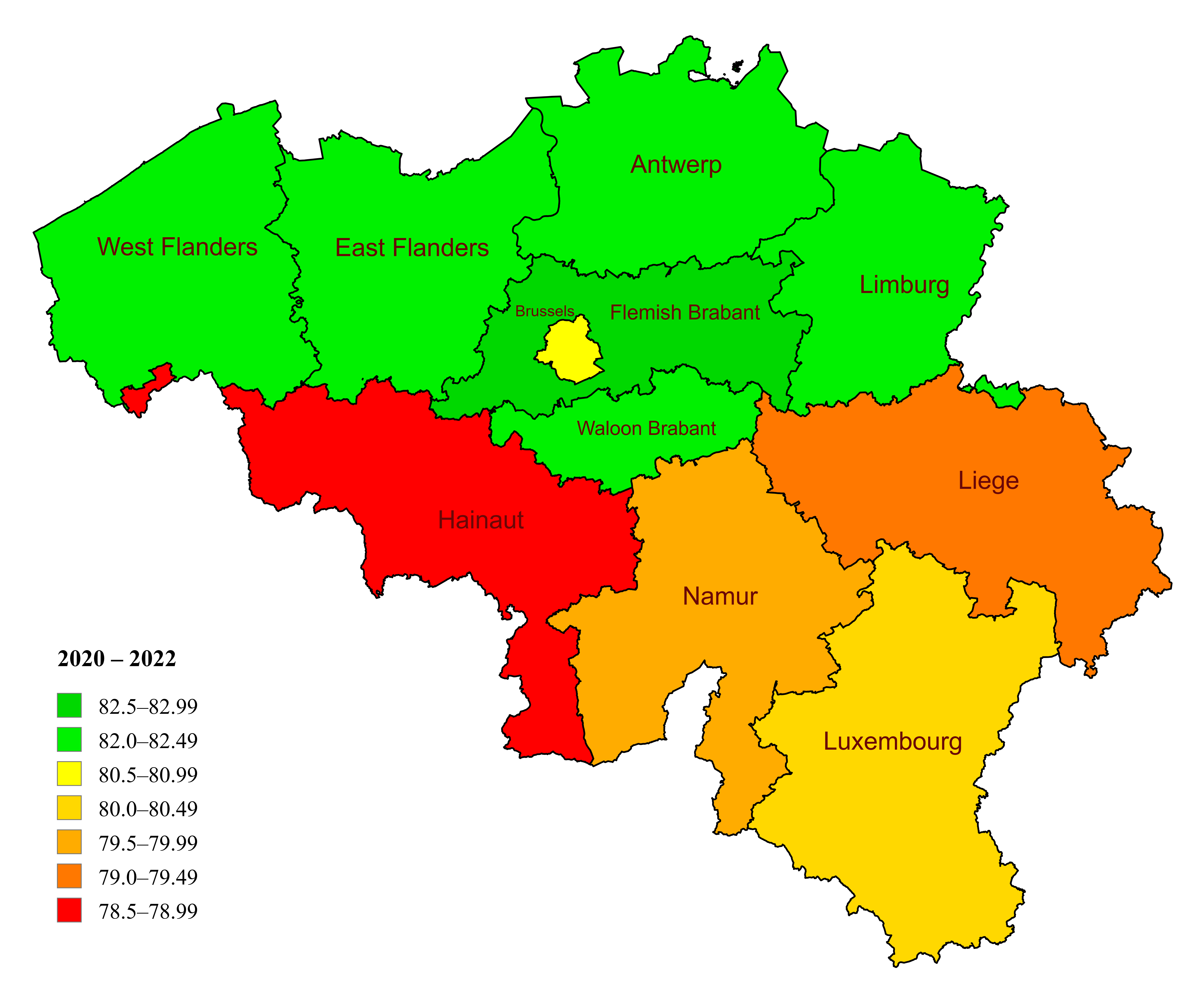
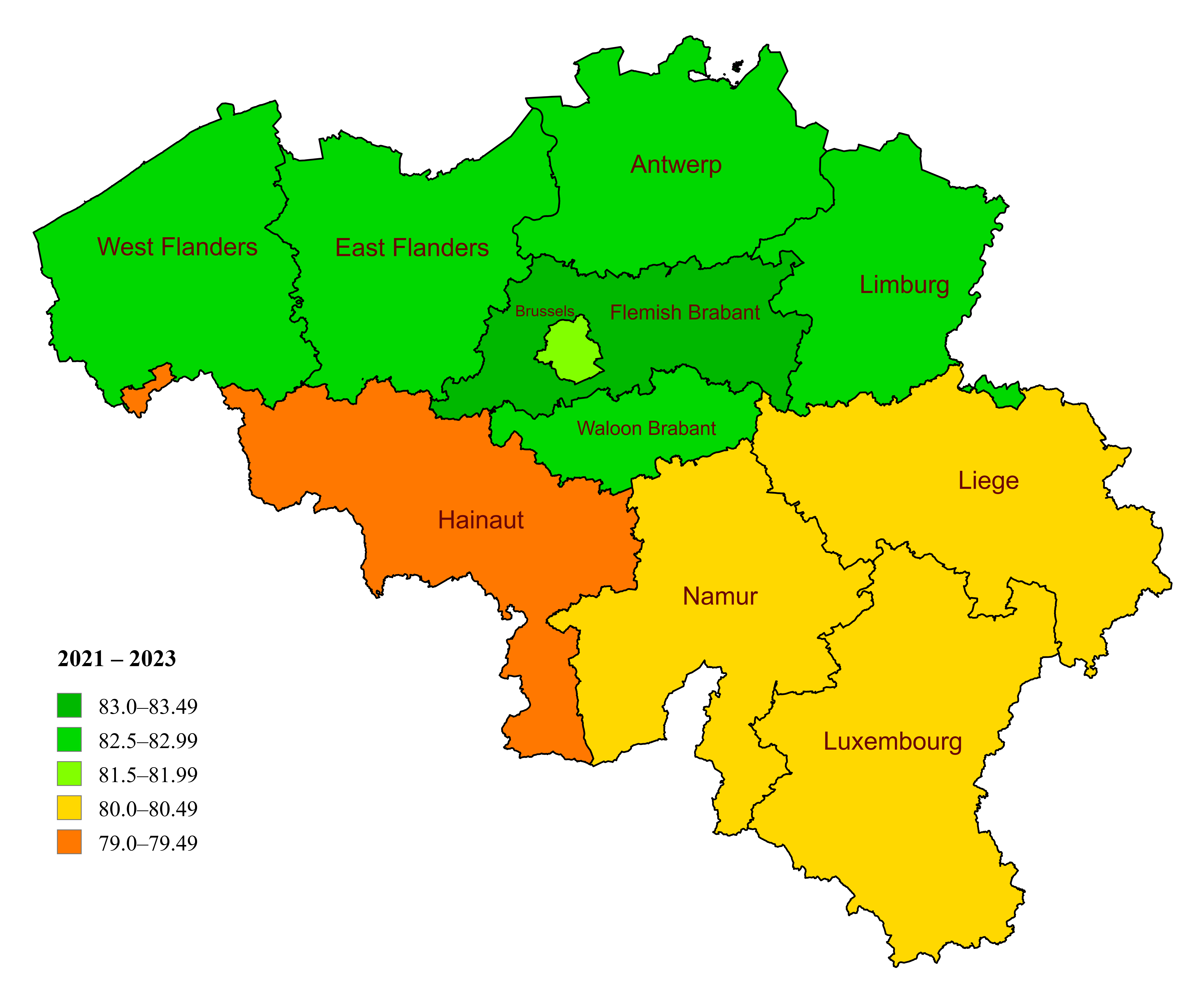
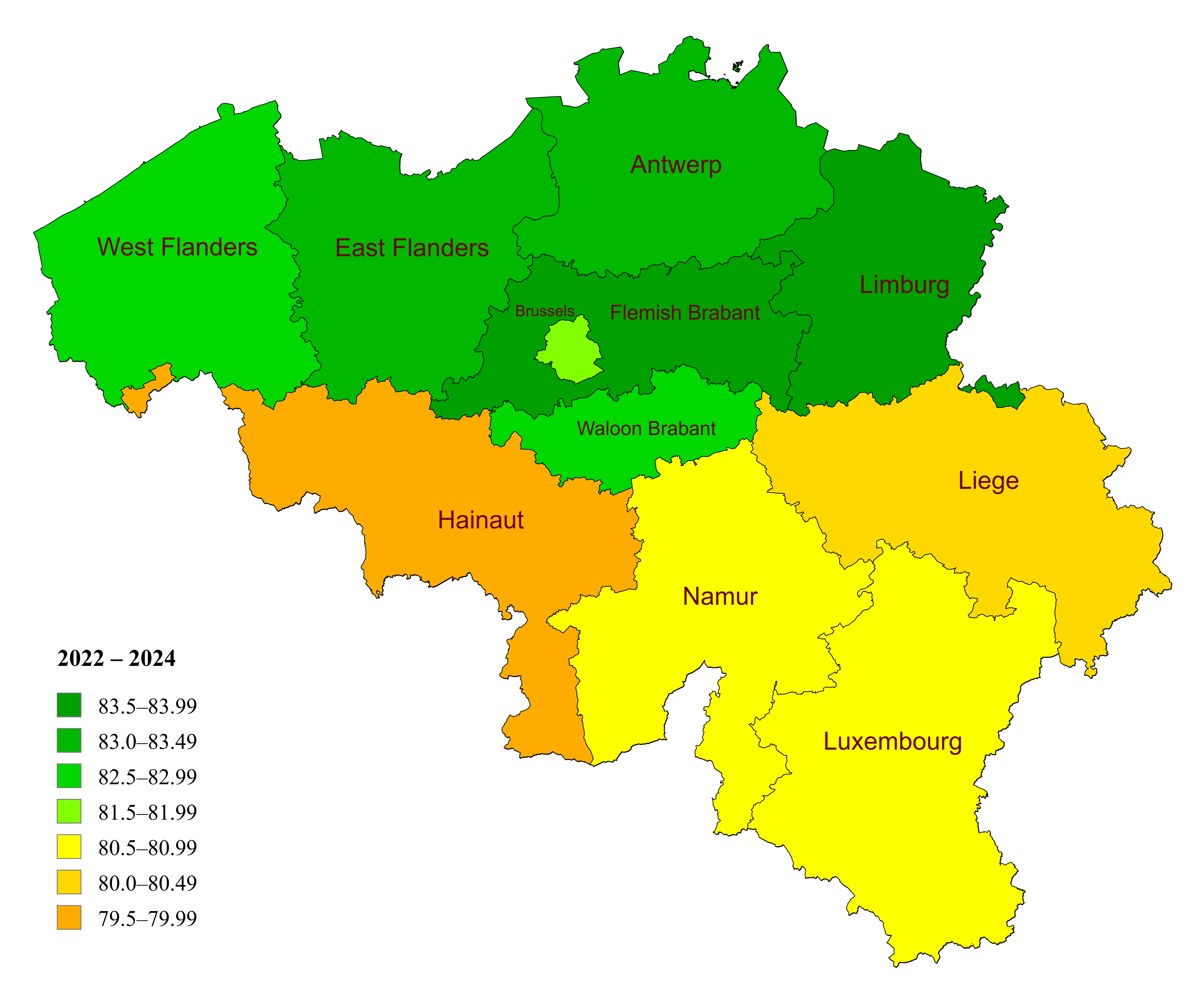
Life expectancy in Belgian provinces in periods, given in the table (legends on the maps are identical)

==== Statistics by region ====
Region	2023				Historical data									Recovery from COVID-19: 2019→2023
Region	All	Male	Female	Sex gap	2019	2019 →2020	2020	2020 →2021	2021	2021 →2022	2022	2022 →2023	2023	Recovery from COVID-19: 2019→2023
Flanders	83.17	81.26	85.03	3.77	82.70	−0.70	82.00	0.68	82.68	−0.06	82.62	0.55	83.17	0.47
Belgium	82.28	80.18	84.30	4.12	81.83	−1.04	80.79	0.86	81.65	0.04	81.69	0.59	82.28	0.45
Brussels	82.18	79.73	84.41	4.68	81.59	−1.98	79.61	1.67	81.28	0.31	81.58	0.59	82.18	0.59
Wallonia	80.64	78.25	82.94	4.69	80.28	−1.33	78.94	0.93	79.87	0.14	80.02	0.63	80.64	0.37

Data source: Statistics Belgium

==== Historical data ====
Life expectancy in Belgium, 1841 to 2023

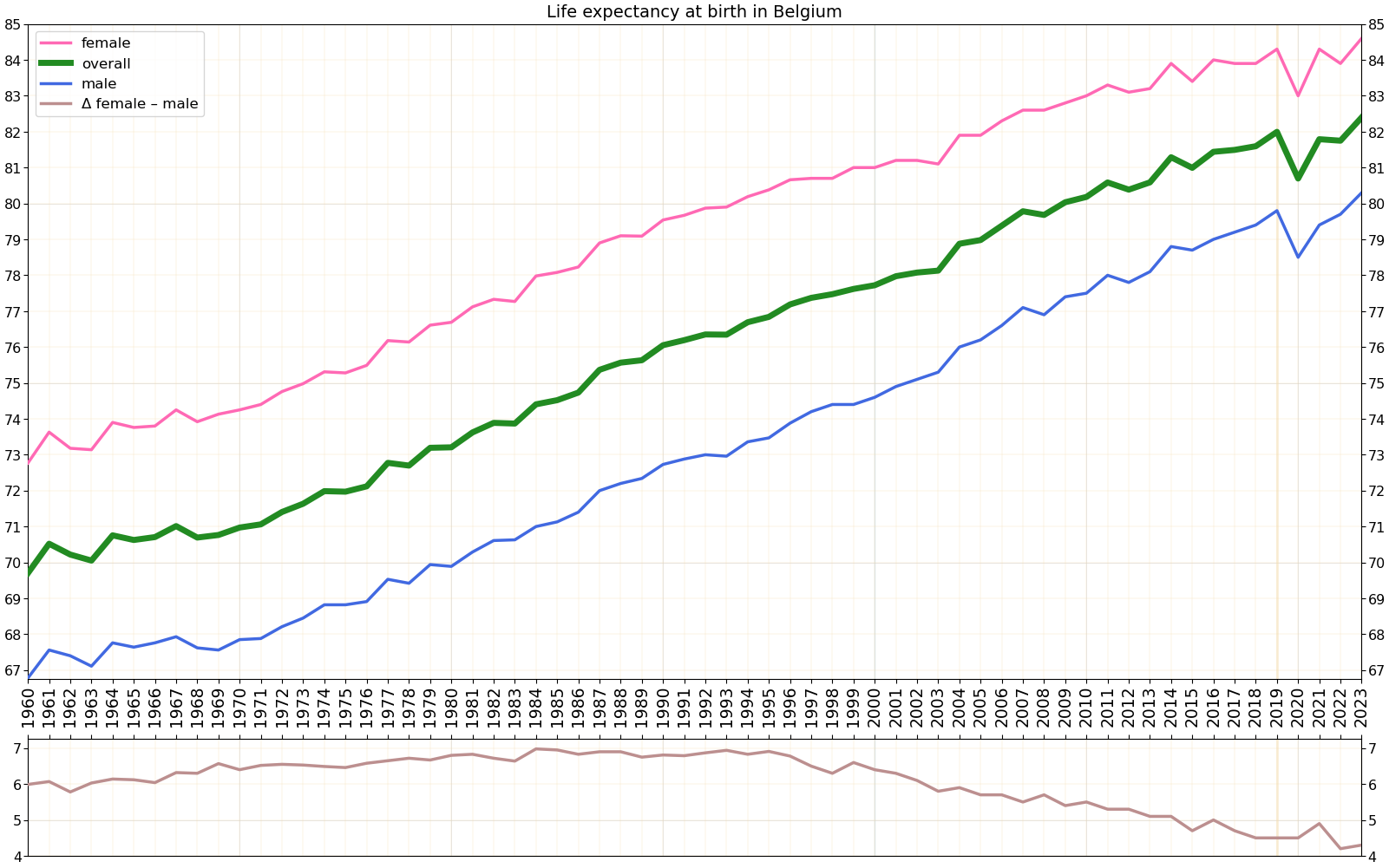
Life expectancy in Belgium by gender, 1960 to 2023

Sources: Our World In Data and the United Nations.

1841–1950

Years	1841	1842	1843	1844	1845	1846	1847	1848	1849	1850
Life expectancy in Belgium	40.3	38.6	40.4	41.9	41.0	37.8	35.1	38.0	35.0	42.3

Years	1851	1852	1853	1854	1855	1856	1857	1858	1859	1860
Life expectancy in Belgium	41.9	41.8	41.3	39.7	37.4	40.9	40.4	40.1	38.9	45.1

Years	1861	1862	1863	1864	1865	1866	1867	1868	1869	1870
Life expectancy in Belgium	41.2	43.1	41.3	39.8	37.7	32.4	43.0	42.5	42.6	40.9

Years	1871	1872	1873	1874	1875	1876	1877	1878	1879	1880
Life expectancy in Belgium	34.3	40.0	43.5	44.7	42.1	43.7	44.5	44.2	43.8	42.4

Years	1881	1882	1883	1884	1885	1886	1887	1888	1889	1890
Life expectancy in Belgium	44.4	45.5	44.9	44.2	45.4	43.3	46.0	44.9	45.0	44.1

Years	1891	1892	1893	1894	1895	1896	1897	1898	1899	1900
Life expectancy in Belgium	44.0	43.1	44.4	46.6	45.4	48.0	48.8	48.1	46.5	46.5

Years	1901	1902	1903	1904	1905	1906	1907	1908	1909	1910
Life expectancy in Belgium	49.4	49.1	49.2	49.3	49.9	49.6	51.0	49.6	50.6	51.3

Years	1911	1912	1913	1919	1920
Life expectancy in Belgium	49.2	52.3	52.4	49.8	53.6

Years	1921	1922	1923	1924	1925	1926	1927	1928	1929	1930
Life expectancy in Belgium	54.7	55.1	56.7	57.4	57.1	56.9	57.1	57.4	55.0	57.1

Years	1931	1932	1933	1934	1935	1936	1937	1938	1939	1940
Life expectancy in Belgium	58.4	58.5	58.7	60.3	59.9	59.9	60.0	60.1	60.0	55.9

Years	1941	1942	1943	1944	1945	1946	1947	1948	1949	1950
Life expectancy in Belgium	58.9	59.1	60.3	56.9	58.4	61.9	63.4	64.9	65.4	66.3

1950–2015

Period	Life expectancy in Years	Period	Life expectancy in Years
1950–1955	67.8	1985–1990	75.3
1955–1960	69.5	1990–1995	76.4
1960–1965	70.3	1995–2000	77.4
1965–1970	70.7	2000–2005	78.4
1970–1975	71.5	2005–2010	79.6
1975–1980	72.7	2010–2015	80.5
1980–1985	73.9	2015–2020	81.44

=== Age structure ===
Population pyramid of Belgium from 1950 to 2020

0–14 years: 17.22% (male 1,033,383/female 984,624)
15–24 years: 11.2% (male 670,724/female 642,145)
25–54 years: 39.23% (male 2,319,777/female 2,278,450)
55–64 years: 13.14% (male 764,902/female 775,454)
65 years and over: 19.21% (male 988,148/female 1,263,109)

Median age in 2020 (estimation); total: 41.6 years.

male: 40.4 years
female: 42.8 years

=== Density ===
Urbanization; urban population: 98.1% of total population (2020)

rate of urbanization: 0.62% annual rate of change (2015–20 est.)

== Vital statistics ==
Population, fertility rate and net reproduction rate, 1950 to 2021, United Nations estimates

Territorial changes in East-Belgium occurred in 1940 (Germany re-annexed Eupen-Malmedy to Germany after the invasion of Belgium) and 1944 (Return to Belgium)

Notable events in Belgian demographics:

- 1845–1847 – Potato blight
- 1832–1834, 1849, 1855, 1866, 1892–1894 – Cholera outbreaks
- 1871 Smallpox pandemic caused by the Franco-Prussian War
- 1899–1900 Russian flu
- 1914–1918 – World War I
- 1918 Spanish flu
- 1928–1929 Influenza
- 1940–1945 – World War II
- 2020–2023 COVID-19 pandemic

	Average population (January 1)	Live births	Deaths	Natural change	Crude birth rate (per 1,000)	Crude death rate (per 1,000)	Natural change (per 1,000)	Crude migration change (per 1,000)	Total fertility rates (Note: In fertility rates, 2.1 and above is a stable population and has been marked blue, 2 and below leads to an aging population and the result is that the population decreases.)
1830		131,676	104,229	27,447					
1831		135,050	98,088	36,962					
1832		129,070	114,910	14,160					
1833		137,792	114,302	23,490					
1834		139,762	116,573	23,189					
1835		142,917	101,143	41,774					
1836		144,198	101,231	42,967					
1837		142,648	118,142	24,506					
1838		152,170	109,950	42,220					
1839		136,022	105,448	30,574					
1840		138,142	103,902	34,240					
1841		138,135	97,108	41,027					
1842		135,027	103,068	31,959					
1843		132,911	97,055	35,856					
1844		133,976	94,911	39,065					
1845		137,012	97,783	39,229					
1846		119,610	107,835	11,775					
1847		118,106	120,168	−2,062					
1848		120,383	108,287	12,096					
1849		133,185	121,462	11,723					
1850	4,403,222	131,416	92,820	38,596	29.8	21.1	8.7	1.8	4.38
1851	4,449,733	134,382	94,779	39,603	30.2	21.3	8.9	1.2	4.32
1852	4,494,811	134,395	96,189	38,206	29.9	21.4	8.5	−0.1	4.25
1853	4,532,434	127,815	100,166	27,649	28.2	22.1	6.1	1.5	4.18
1854	4,566,802	131,981	103,210	28,771	28.9	22.6	6.3	0.1	4.25
1855	4,596,081	125,933	112,604	13,329	27.4	24.5	2.9	−9	4.31
1856	4,568,264	134,307	97,304	37,003	29.4	21.3	8.1	−11.4	4.38
1857	4,553,349	143,430	103,361	40,069	31.5	22.7	8.8	1.5	4.44
1858	4,600,217	144,907	108,105	36,802	31.5	23.5	8.0	2.2	4.51
1859	4,647,212	149,640	111,533	38,107	32.2	24.0	8.2	3.5	4.53
1860	4,701,611	144,810	93,092	51,718	30.8	19.8	11.0	0.8	4.56
1861	4,757,126	147,471	106,560	40,911	31.0	22.4	8.6	2.4	4.58
1862	4,809,411	145,725	100,036	45,689	30.3	20.8	9.5	2	4.61
1863	4,864,794	155,673	107,998	47,675	32.0	22.2	9.8	0.9	4.63
1864	4,916,796	155,862	116,036	39,826	31.7	23.6	8.1	1.2	4.66
1865	4,962,461	156,318	122,573	33,745	31.5	24.7	6.8	−18.2	4.68
1866	4,906,092	157,976	151,108	6,868	32.2	30.8	1.4	−10.2	4.71
1867	4,862,814	157,069	105,523	51,546	32.3	21.7	10.6	3.2	4.73
1868	4,929,719	156,237	107,454	48,783	31.7	21.8	9.9	2.6	4.76
1869	4,991,490	158,071	109,813	48,258	31.8	22.0	9.8	3	4.78
1870	5,054,581	164,460	118,283	46,177	32.6	23.4	9.2	0	4.80
1871	5,100,753	158,723	145,378	13,345	31.1	28.6	2.5	5.9	4.83
1872	5,144,359	167,474	120,427	47,047	32.5	23.4	9.1	4.5	4.85
1873	5,214,416	170,365	112,554	57,811	32.7	21.6	11.1	4.4	4.87
1874	5,295,214	174,104	109,588	64,516	32.9	20.7	12.2	1.9	4.85
1875	5,369,786	175,604	122,396	53,208	32.7	22.8	9.9	−10	4.83
1876	5,369,562	176,655	116,583	60,072	32.9	21.7	11.2	−10.3	4.82
1877	5,374,458	175,081	114,500	60,581	32.6	21.3	11.3	1.8	4.80
1878	5,444,835	172,727	117,240	55,487	31.7	21.5	10.2	1.2	4.78
1879	5,506,897	174,044	121,152	52,892	31.7	22.0	9.7	−5.7	4.75
1880	5,528,432	171,992	123,311	48,681	31.1	22.3	8.8	−4.4	4.71
1881	5,552,928	175,473	117,167	58,306	31.6	21.1	10.5	1.7	4.68
1882	5,620,522	176,474	114,088	62,386	31.4	20.3	11.1	0.9	4.64
1883	5,688,002	174,618	119,448	55,170	30.7	21.0	9.7	1.7	4.61
1884	5,752,883	176,633	120,810	55,823	30.7	21.0	9.7	1.8	4.55
1885	5,819,118	175,168	117,554	57,614	30.1	20.2	0.8	2.0	4.49
1886	5,881,627	175,261	124,693	50,568	29.8	21.2	8.6	1.7	4.42
1887	5,942,359	175,302	115,278	60,024	29.5	19.4	10.1	0	4.36
1888	6,002,393	175,880	121,249	54,631	29.3	20.2	9.1	0.8	4.30
1889	6,061,921	177,612	120,027	57,585	29.3	19.8	9.5	−6.3	4.27
1890	6,081,560	176,366	126,498	49,868	29.0	20.8	8.2	−4.7	4.25
1891	6,102,883	181,868	128,275	53,593	29.8	21.1	8.8	1.5	4.22
1892	6,165,900	177,576	133,815	43,761	28.8	21.7	7.1	3.1	4.20
1893	6,228,814	183,113	125,820	57,293	29.4	20.2	9.2	2.6	4.17
1894	6,302,115	181,497	118,482	63,015	28.8	18.8	10.0	1.8	4.13
1895	6,376,371	183,002	124,969	58,033	28.7	19.6	9.1	3	4.09
1896	6,453,335	188,433	113,576	74,857	29.2	17.6	11.6	2	4.06
1897	6,541,240	191,013	113,822	77,191	29.2	17.4	11.8	1.5	4.02
1898	6,628,163	190,906	113,000(e)	77,906	28.8	17.1	11.7	0.2	3.98
1899	6,707,132	194,507	113,000(e)	81,507	29.0	16.9	12.1	−10.4	3.91
1900	6,719,000	193,230	126,633	66,597	28.8	18.8	9.9	−5.7	3.84
1901	6,747,000	199,068	113,136	85,932	29.5	16.8	12.7	2.3	3.79
1902	6,848,000	195,076	116,075	79,001	28.5	17.0	11.5	2.1	3.73
1903	6,941,000	191,563	115,884	75,679	27.6	16.7	10.9	1.9	3.68
1904	7,030,000	191,067	117,097	73,970	27.2	16.7	10.5	2.0	3.63
1905	7,118,000	186,665	115,486	71,179	26.2	16.2	10.0	1.5	3.57
1906	7,200,000	185,508	115,514	69,994	25.8	16.0	9.7	1.1	3.52
1907	7,278,000	184,371	112,656	71,715	25.3	15.5	9.9	0.3	3.47
1908	7,352,000	183,046	118,997	64,049	24.9	16.2	8.7	0.4	3.42
1909	7,419,000	175,714	115,027	60,687	23.7	15.5	8.2	−5.6	3.95
1910	7,438,000	175,768	110,403	65,365	23.6	14.8	8.8	−6.2	3.31
1911	7,457,000	171,029	119,896	51,133	22.9	16.1	6.9	3.0	3.26
1912	7,531,000	170,465	109,405	61,060	22.6	14.5	8.1	1.7	3.2
1913	7,605,000	170,102	108,296	61,806	22.4	14.2	8.1	−0.6	3.15
1914	7,662,000	156,389	108,720	47,669	20.4	14.2	6.2	−1.6	3.22
1915	7,697,000	124,291	100,674	23,617	16.1	13.1	3.1	−2.6	3.04
1916	7,701,000	99,360	101,044	−1,684	12.9	13.1	−0.2	−4.2	2.99
1917	7,667,000	86,675	124,824	−38,149	11.3	16.3	−5.0	−3.9	2.94
1918	7,599,000	85,056	157,340	−72,284	11.2	20.7	−9.5	5.2	2.89
1919	7,566,000	128,236	112,986	15,250	16.9	14.9	2.0	−11.9	2.87
1920	7,491,000	164,257	102,706	61,551	21.9	13.7	8.2	−14.5	2.78
1921	7,444,000	162,401	100,468	61,933	21.8	13.5	8.3	0.7	2.73
1922	7,511,000	152,779	104,155	48,624	20.3	13.9	6.5	1.8	2.67
1923	7,573,000	156,005	99,113	56,892	20.6	13.1	7.5	2.1	2.62
1924	7,646,000	153,387	98,332	55,055	20.1	12.9	7.2	6.1	2.57
1925	7,748,000	153,190	99,569	53,621	19.8	12.9	6.9	5.4	2.51
1926	7,843,000	148,840	101,018	47,822	19.0	12.9	6.1	1.6	2.46
1927	7,903,000	144,211	103,007	41,204	18.2	13.0	5.2	3.0	2.41
1928	7,968,000	145,953	102,270	43,683	18.3	12.8	5.5	2.5	2.36
1929	8,032,000	145,542	115,901	29,641	18.1	14.4	3.7	1.8	2.3
1930	8,076,000	150,271	103,397	46,874	18.6	12.8	5.8	0.4	2.25
1931	8,126,000	147,489	103,773	43,716	18.2	12.8	5.4	2.0	2.22
1932	8,186,000	143,824	104,221	39,603	17.6	12.7	4.8	0.7	2.19
1933	8,231,000	134,754	104,640	30,114	16.4	12.7	3.7	0.1	2.08
1934	8,262,000	131,736	96,851	34,885	15.9	11.7	4.2	−1.1	2.04
1935	8,288,000	126,304	102,132	24,172	15.2	12.3	2.9	0.4	1.94
1936	8,315,000	125,511	101,595	23,916	15.1	12.2	2.9	0.8	1.95
1937	8,346,000	125,495	104,163	21,332	15.0	12.5	2.6	0.8	1.99
1938	8,374,000	130,133	104,684	25,449	15.5	12.5	3.0	−1.0	2.11
1939	8,391,000	126,257	110,393	15,864	15.0	13.2	1.9	−12.6	2.1
1940	8,301,000	110,323	125,083	−14,760	13.3	15.1	−1.8	−1.2	1.84
1941	8,276,000	98,417	118,670	−20,253	11.9	14.3	−2.4	−1.2	1.66
1942	8,246,000	105,749	117,291	−11,542	12.8	14.2	−1.4	0.8	1.81
1943	8,241,000	120,665	107,767	12,898	14.6	13.1	1.6	4.5	2.06
1944	8,291,000	124,075	124,861	−786	15.0	15.1	−0.1	5.9	2.12
1945	8,339,000	127,245	121,155	6,090	15.3	14.5	0.7	2.7	2.17
1946	8,367,000	146,731	110,413	36,318	17.5	13.2	4.3	5.6	2.53
1947	8,450,000	144,979	108,136	36,843	17.2	12.8	4.4	8.3	2.47
1948	8,557,000	148,210	103,576	44,634	17.3	12.1	5.2	1.5	2.45
1949	8,614,000	144,670	106,704	37,966	16.8	12.4	4.4	−1.5	2.39
1950	8,639,000	142,970	104,039	38,931	16.5	12.0	4.5	0	2.33
1951	8,678,000	142,524	107,688	34,836	16.4	12.4	4.0	2.0	2.34
1952	8,730,000	146,142	103,624	42,518	16.7	11.9	4.9	0.6	2.35
1953	8,778,000	146,522	106,024	40,498	16.7	12.1	4.6	0.1	2.37
1954	8,819,000	148,128	104,795	43,333	16.8	11.9	4.9	0.7	2.4
1955	8,868,000	148,798	108,316	40,482	16.8	12.2	4.6	1.7	2.42
1956	8,924,000	150,181	108,016	42,165	16.8	12.1	4.7	2.6	2.6
1957	8,989,000	152,388	107,236	45,152	17.0	11.9	5.0	2.1	2.49
1958	9,053,000	155,694	105,746	49,948	17.2	11.7	5.5	0.1	2.53
1959	9,104,000	160,662	103,513	57,149	17.6	11.4	6.3	−0.9	2.57
1960	9,153,000	155,520	113,106	42,414	17.0	12.4	4.6	−1.2	2.6
1961	9,184,000	158,262	106,259	52,003	17.2	11.6	5.7	1.6	2.64
1962	9,251,000	154,338	111,545	42,793	16.7	12.1	4.6	3.7	2.59
1963	9,328,000	158,196	115,618	42,578	17.0	12.4	4.6	6.1	2.68
1964	9,428,000	160,371	109,342	51,029	17.0	11.6	5.4	2.1	2.71
1965	9,499,000	154,856	114,507	40,349	16.3	12.1	4.2	−1.1	2.62
1966	9,528,000	150,636	114,557	36,079	15.8	12.0	3.8	1.8	2.52
1967	9,581,000	145,899	114,509	31,390	15.2	12.0	3.3	0.7	2.41
1968	9,619,000	141,242	121,275	19,967	14.7	12.6	2.1	2.2	2.31
1969	9,660,000	140,834	119,375	21,459	14.6	12.4	2.2	−2.6	2.27
1970	9,656,000	141,119	119,623	21,496	14.6	12.4	2.2	1.8	2.25
1971	9,695,000	139,104	118,853	20,251	14.3	12.3	2.1	−0.4	2.21
1972	9,711,000	134,437	116,743	17,694	13.8	12.0	1.8	1.4	2.09
1973	9,742,000	129,425	118,313	11,112	13.3	12.1	1.1	2.0	1.95
1974	9,772,000	123,155	116,039	7,116	12.6	11.9	0.7	2.3	1.83
1975	9,801,000	119,273	119,273	0	12.2	12.2	0.0	1.7	1.74
1976	9,818,000	120,472	118,765	1,707	12.3	12.1	0.2	1.0	1.72
1977	9,830,000	121,523	112,208	9,315	12.4	11.4	0.9	0.1	1.71
1978	9,840,000	121,983	115,060	6,923	12.4	11.7	0.7	0.1	1.69
1979	9,848,000	123,658	112,156	11,502	12.6	11.4	1.2	−1.1	1.69
1980	9,849,000	124,794	114,364	10,430	12.7	11.6	1.1	−0.1	1.69
1981	9,859,000	124,827	113,308	11,519	12.7	11.5	1.2	−1.5	1.67
1982	9,856,000	120,382	112,506	7,876	12.2	11.4	0.8	−0.8	1.61
1983	9,856,000	117,395	114,814	2,581	11.9	11.6	0.3	−0.4	1.56
1984	9,855,000	115,790	110,577	5,213	11.7	11.2	0.5	−0.2	1.53
1985	9,858,000	114,283	112,691	1,592	11.6	11.4	0.2	0.2	1.51
1986	9,862,000	117,271	111,671	5,600	11.9	11.3	0.6	0.2	1.54
1987	9,870,000	117,448	105,840	11,608	11.9	10.7	1.2	2.0	1.57
1988	9,902,000	118,764	104,551	14,213	12.0	10.6	1.4	2.2	1.57
1989	9,938,000	120,550	107,332	13,218	12.1	10.8	1.3	1.6	1.58
1990	9,967,000	123,554	104,545	19,009	12.4	10.5	1.9	−0.7	1.62
1991	9,978,681	125,412	104,223	21,189	12.5	10.4	2.1	2.2	1.66
1992	10,021,997	125,322	103,858	21,464	12.5	10.3	2.1	2.5	1.65
1993	10,068,319	120,835	106,715	14,120	12.0	10.6	1.4	1.8	1.61
1994	10,100,341	116,408	103,688	12,720	11.5	10.2	1.3	1.7	1.56
1995	10,130,398	115,327	104,710	10,617	11.4	10.3	1.0	0.2	1.56
1996	10,142,776	116,262	104,228	12,034	11.4	10.3	1.2	1.5	1.59
1997	10,170,226	116,125	103,822	12,303	11.4	10.2	1.2	1.0	1.60
1998	10,192,264	114,561	104,607	9,954	11.2	10.3	1.0	1.1	1.60
1999	10,213,752	113,710	104,933	8,777	11.1	10.3	0.9	1.6	1.62
2000	10,239,085	115,157	104,921	10,236	11.2	10.2	1.0	1.4	1.67
2001	10,263,414	114,428	103,474	10,954	11.1	10.1	1.1	3.4	1.67
2002	10,309,725	111,484	105,667	5,817	10.8	10.2	0.6	3.9	1.65
2003	10,355,844	112,388	107,068	5,320	10.8	10.3	0.5	3.4	1.67
2004	10,396,421	115,908	101,964	13,944	11.1	9.8	1.3	3.5	1.72
2005	10,445,852	118,290	103,305	14,985	11.3	9.9	1.4	4.9	1.76
2006	10,511,382	121,695	101,614	20,081	11.5	9.6	1.9	5.1	1.80
2007	10,584,534	125,228	102,060	23,168	11.8	9.6	2.2	5.4	1.82
2008	10,665,140	128,049	104,587	23,462	12.0	9.8	2.2	6.0	1.85
2009	10,753,080	127,297	104,509	22,788	11.8	9.7	2.1	6.0	1.84
2010	10,839,905	129,173	105,094	24,079	11.9	9.7	2.2	8.1	1.85
2011	10,951,266	127,655	104,247	23,408	11.7	9.5	2.1	5.6	1.81
2012	11,035,948	126,993	109,034	17,959	11.5	9.9	1.6	4.2	1.79
2013	11,099,554	124,862	109,295	15,567	11.2	9.8	1.4	3.2	1.75
2014	11,150,516	124,415	104,723	19,692	11.2	9.4	1.8	3.4	1.74
2015	11,209,044	121,713	110,508	11,205	10.9	9.9	1.0	4.3	1.69
2016	11,267,910	121,161	108,056	13,105	10.8	9.6	1.2	3.6	1.68
2017	11,322,088	119,102	109,629	9,473	10.5	9.7	0.8	4.0	1.64
2018	11,376,070	117,800	110,645	7,155	10.4	9.7	0.6	4.3	1.61
2019	11,431,406	117,103	108,745	8,358	10.2	9.5	0.7	4.6	1.60
2020	11,492,641	113,739	126,850	−13,111	9.9	11.0	−1.1	3.6	1.55
2021	11,521,238	117,914	112,291	5,623	10.3	9.8	0.5	5.0	1.60
2022	11,584,008	113,593	116,380	−2,787	9.8	10.0	−0.3	10.1	1.53
2023	11,697,557	110,198	111,255	−1,057	9.5	9.6	−0.1	5.7	1.47
2024	11,763,650	108,150	112,029	−3,879	9.2	9.5	−0.3	4.4	1.44
2025	11,825,551	108,033	112,923	–4,890	9.1	9.5	–0.4	5.6	1.43
2026	11,867,634								

=== Current vital statistics ===
Period	Live births	Deaths	Natural increase
January–June 2025	53,959	59,140	−5,181
January–June 2026	54,257	58,266	−4,009
Difference	▲ +298 (+0.6%)	▼ –874 (−1.5%)	▲ +1,172

- Deaths January–August 2025 = ▲76,100
- Deaths January–August 2026 = ▼75,877

=== Total fertility rates by province ===
2023
Province	TFR
Luxembourg	1.58
Antwerp	1.56
Hainaut	1.52
West Flanders	1.52
Flemish Brabant	1.51
Liège	1.48
Belgium	1.47
East Flanders	1.45
Namur	1.44
Limburg	1.41
Walloon Brabant	1.40
Brussels	1.36

=== Structure of the population ===
Population by Sex and Age Group (Census 01.I.2011):

Age group	Male	Female	Total	%
Total	5 401 718	5 598 920	11 000 638	100
0–4	330 184	315 328	645 512	5.87
5–9	310 560	296 765	607 325	5.52
10–14	313 738	300 722	614 460	5.59
15–19	331 790	317 228	649 018	5.90
20–24	344 647	339 446	684 093	6.22
25–29	351 045	349 328	700 373	6.37
30–34	364 728	358 208	722 936	6.57
35–39	375 815	365 389	741 204	6.74
40–44	401 530	388 365	789 895	7.18
45–49	418 827	409 340	828 167	7.53
50–54	391 809	389 431	781 240	7.10
55–59	349 489	352 842	702 331	6.38
60–64	320 714	330 190	650 904	5.92
65−69	230 217	249 982	480 199	4.37
70−74	205 382	242 992	448 374	4.08
75−79	171 538	230 056	401 594	3.65
80−84	115 591	189 197	304 788	2.77
85−89	57 963	122 532	180 495	1.64
90−94	13 541	39 167	52 708	0.48
95−99	2 412	10 980	13 392	0.12
100+	198	1 432	1 630	0.01
Age group	Male	Female	Total	Percent
0–14	954 482	912 815	1 867 297	16.97
15–64	3 650 394	3 599 767	7 250 161	65.91
65+	796 842	1 086 338	1 883 180	17.12

Population Estimates by Sex and Age Group (01.I.2019):

Age group	Male	Female	Total	%
Total	5 644 826	5 810 693	11 455 519	100
0–4	315 177	300 999	616 176	5.38
5–9	340 923	325 662	666 585	5.82
10–14	336 284	320 521	656 805	5.73
15–19	323 790	307 712	631 502	5.51
20–24	341 598	328 722	670 320	5.85
25–29	374 924	371 623	746 547	6.52
30–34	368 166	368 614	736 780	6.43
35–39	377 157	374 627	751 784	6.56
40–44	368 567	362 807	731 374	6.38
45–49	393 483	384 045	777 528	6.79
50–54	406 309	396 620	802 929	7.01
55–59	395 854	395 473	791 327	6.91
60–64	349 994	360 409	710 403	6.20
65−69	298 587	317 045	615 632	5.37
70−74	249 942	281 596	531 538	4.64
75−79	165 281	206 039	371 320	3.24
80−84	131 154	188 231	319 385	2.79
85−89	76 742	138 520	215 262	1.88
90−94	26 044	63 743	89 787	0.78
95−99	4 640	16 410	21 050	0.18
100−104	201	1 188	1 389	0.01
105−109	9	84	93	<0.01
110+	0	3	3	<0.01
Age group	Male	Female	Total	Percent
0–14	992 384	947 182	1 939 566	16.93
15–64	3 699 842	3 650 652	7 350 494	64.17
65+	952 600	1 212 859	2 165 459	18.90

== Immigration ==
Since the relaxation of the Belgian nationality law, more than 1.3 million migrants have acquired Belgian citizenship and are now considered new Belgians. 89.2% of inhabitants of Turkish origin have been naturalized, as have 88.4% of people of Moroccan background, 75.4% of Italians, 56.2% of the French and 47.8% of Dutch people.

In 2007, there were 1.38 million foreign-born residents in Belgium, corresponding to 12.9% of the total population. Of these, 685 000 (6.4%) were born outside the EU and 695 000 (6.5%) were born in another EU Member State.

Net migration rate; 4.58 migrant(s)/1,000 population (2021 est.)

=== Belgium migration data ===
Belgium migration data, 1948–present
Year	Immigration	Emigration	Net migration
1948	89,924	60,061	29,863
1949	31,795	63,801	−32,006
1950	27,922	46,569	−18,647
1951	59,954	51,620	8,334
1952	52,150	46,566	5,584
1953	39,964	45,613	−5,649
1954	34,604	41,834	−7,230
1955	51,106	39,037	12,069
1956	52,593	43,724	8,869
1957	68,794	43,221	25,573
1958	47,124	49,322	−2,198
1959	32,315	43,215	−10,900
1960	42,248	39,127	3,121
1961	36,088	42,646	−6,558
1962	52,744	39,084	13,660
1963	72,586	43,161	29,425
1964	92,334	48,511	43,823
1965	80,761	54,167	26,594
1966	71,078	53,887	17,191
1967	63,713	52,967	10,746
1968	57,122	56,628	494
1969	55,243	50,988	4,255
1970	62,143	56,371	5,772
1971	62,708	43,341	19,367
1972	62,474	54,791	7,683
1973	64,250	52,603	11,647
1974	71,866	52,670	19,196
1975	69,886	53,739	16,147
1976	58,724	56,921	1,803
1977	55,298	55,076	222
1978	52,594	58,495	−5,901
1979	54,854	59,552	−4,698
1980	54,694	58,212	−3,518
1981	49,298	60,194	−10,896
1982	44,659	61,931	−17,272
1983	43,657	61,339	−17,682
1984	47,002	56,447	−9,445
1985	47,042	54,021	−6,979
1986	48,959	53,793	−4,834
1987	49,750	57,033	−7,283
1988	54,048	54,082	−34
1989	60,067	49,439	10,628
1990	68,929	49,246	19,683
1991	74,617	60,471	14,146
1992	80,191	55,411	24,780
1993	78,376	59,843	18,533
1994	81,865	64,234	17,631
1995	78,459	64,822	13,637
1996	78,046	65,167	12,879
1997	76,449	69,716	6,733
1998	80,194	73,199	6,995
1999	87,915	75,866	12,049
2000	90,412	76,848	13,564
2001	111,866	76,566	35,300
2002	115,542	77,121	38,421
2003	113,794	80,764	33,030
2004	119,143	85,474	33,669
2005	135,289	88,216	47,073
2006	139,595	89,576	50,019
2007	151,069	93,952	57,117
2008	164,152	100,275	63,877
2009	166,479	103,718	62,761
2010	166,188	86,719	79,469
2011	161,508	99,422	62,086
2012	149,095	104,697	44,398
2013	146,645	111,814	34,831
2014	153,926	113,975	39,951
2015	158,032	110,360	47,672
2016	160,480	118,245	42,235
2017	163,918	119,382	44,536
2018	166,894	116,714	50,180
2019	174,591	119,560	55,031
2020	144,169	102,413	41,756
2021	165,534	107,416	58,118
2022	233,629	117,085	116,544
2023	194,887	128,538	66,349
2024	194,212	128,168	66,044
2025	177,094	129,532	47,562

Distribution of foreigners by nationality in Belgium
Country of origin	2013	2015	2017	2019	2020	2021	2022	2023	2024
Total population	11,099,554	11,209,044	11,322,088	11,431,406	11,492,641	11,521,238	11,584,008	11,697,597	11,763,650
Belgium	9,904,432	9,953,758	9,994,312	10,039,981	10,065,990	10,073,385	10,100,333	10,124,284	10,155,943
Total foreigners	1,195,122	1,255,286	1,327,776	1,391,425	1,426,651	1,447,853	1,483,675	1,573,313	1,607,707
France	153,413	159,352	164,410	167,508	170,324	173,282	176,199	179,272	181,143
The Netherlands	143,977	149,199	153,736	157,474	159,319	160,875	163,474	166,360	168,242
Italy	157,426	156,977	156,726	155,866	155,696	154,544	153,813	153,416	152,524
Romania	50,906	65,768	80,669	96,034	105,358	110,917	117,274	124,876	128,898
Morocco	83,271	82,009	82,586	80,295	80,579	80,550	81,420	81,667	81,872
Spain	54,406	60,386	63,043	65,476	67,861	69,933	73,556	77,333	80,790
Poland	61,524	68,403	71,457	71,331	70,671	69,820	69,082	68,838	68,136
Ukraine	4,109	4,382	4,695	5,072	5,426	5,624	5,988	58,029	64,420
Portugal	38,812	42,793	45,816	47,677	48,979	50,116	51,802	53,598	55,609
Bulgaria	23,386	28,721	33,152	37,277	40,687	43,104	45,590	48,474	49,404
Turkey	37,989	36,747	36,167	36,678	37,492	37,717	38,936	40,250	41,700
Germany	39,745	39,294	39,501	39,608	39,714	39,936	40,331	40,850	41,206
Syria					32,594	32,614	32,264	32,274	
Unknown and stateless	8,909	11,529	14,844	21,380	23,286	25,326	26,270	26,790	24,314
Afghanistan	5,100	8,030	11,133	16,372	17,717	18,263	19,561	21,451	23,306
DRC	20,066	20,625	21,282	21,526	21,357	21,395	21,617	21,363	21,131
India	8,864	10,383	11,733	14,683	15,747	15,999	17,050	18,696	20,141
Greece	15,513	16,275	17,017	17,921	18,297	18,375	18,720	19,204	19,638
Cameroon	10,035	10,732	11,842	12,831	13,201	13,756	15,169	15,485	15,912
China	10,454	11,275	12,155	12,930	13,479	13,037	13,544	14,075	14,490
United Kingdom	24,543	23,794	22,949	20,344	19,026	18,574	16,273	14,816	13,840
Brazil	7,463	8,047	8,456	9,210	9,745	10,092	10,880	11,778	12,817
Palestine					6,784	7,198	8 500	11,753	
Russia	13,831	12,434	12,259	12,045	11,836	11,514	11,414	11,244	11,125
Algeria	10,075	9,944	9,961	9,784	9,938	10,073	10,313	10,634	10,807
United States	11,526	11,489	11,252	10,793	10,877	10,356	10,497	10,354	10 365
Guinea	6,930	8,262	9,657	9,903	9,948	10,022	10,241	10,154	9,997
Iraq	6,195	6,559	10,838	13,227	13,375	13,003	11,585	10,052	8,747
Tunisia	4,996	5,524	6,091	6,398	6,627	6,967	7,268	7,819	8,517
Slovakia	5,350	5,707	6,121	6,463	6,820	6,879	7,230	7,416	7,659
Albania	4,941	5,100	5,167	5,582	5,943	6,288	6,610	7,054	7,518
Eritrea					4,068	4,585	5,810	7,476	
Hungary	5,300	6,167	6,509	6,761	6,897	6,929	7,009	7,145	7,439
Somalia	1,286	1,660	3,440	5,237	5,784	6,205	6,321	6,227	6,247
Kosovo	4,597	4,553	4,533	4,830	5,147	5,401	5,606	5,785	6,043
Pakistan	4,673	4,959	5,287	5,293	5,295	5,320	5,484	5,669	6,001
Iran	4,480	4,381	4,107	4,549	4,756	4,948	5,196	5,305	5,765
North Macedonia	4,630	4,280	4,436	4,662	4,786	4,802	4,696	4,524	5,417
Ireland	4,003	4,035	4,168	4,321	4,460	4,631	5,008	5,230	5,334
Luxembourg	4,361	4,335	4,384	4,452	4,522	4,648	4,892	5,123	5,261
Armenia	6,765	6,578	4,747	4,434	4,830	5,106	5,085	5,267	5,177
Serbia	4,091	3,718	3,961	4,247	4,576	4,862	5,041	5,077	5,151
Ghana	3,940	4,449	4,635	4,528	4,647	4,625	4,760	4,852	4,842
Philippines	3,774	4,142	4,398	4,346	4,330	4,319	4,349	4,597	4,720
Burundi		1,587	1,782	2,379	2,806	3,167	3,563	3,691	4,483
Sweden	4,262	3,918	3,859	3,763	3,749	3,754	3,919	4,058	4,247
Japan	4,464	4,386	4,263	4,385	4,406	4,111	4,260	4,241	4,242
Czech Republic	3,212	3,407	3,490	3,468	3,614	3,676	3,782	3,798	3,848
Nigeria	3,293	3,671	3,786	3,755	3,731	3,738	3,783	3,831	3,816
Thailand	3,398	3,499	3,705	3,842	3,889	3,777	3,862	3,881	3,747
Lebanon					1,952	2,169	2,868	3,414	3,768
Moldova					1,866	2,163	2,682	3,730	
Lithuania	2,168	2,472	2,506	2,836	3,054	3,165	3,347	3,511	3,589
Croatia	1,026	1,491	2,040	2,601	2,815	3,023	3,173	3,366	3,533
Senegal	1,890	2,223	2,610	2,792	2,896	2,937	3,108	3,223	3,351
Austria	2,712	2,767	2,814	2,844	2,883	2,889	2,983	3,085	3,159
Finland	2,926	2,859	2,863	2,946	2,935	2,860	2,916	2,980	3,001
Rwanda	3,607	3,316	3,116	3,023	2,923	2,850	2,790	2,753	2,766
Colombia		1,806	1,840	1,992	2,160	2 237	2,381	2,589	2,734
Nepal							2,140	2,409	2,687
Canada	2,816	2,839	2,719	2,723	2,767	2,615	2,515	2,585	2,644
Denmark	2,861	2,774	2,792	2,733	2,675	2,670	2,663	2,653	2,625
Angola	3,026	2,973	2,864	2,749	2,662	2,644	2,628	2,612	2,595
Ivory Coast	2,169	2,239	2,287	2,352	2,391	2,441	2,543	2,552	2,559
Latvia	1,643	1,764	1,851	2,020	2,112	2,180	2,245	2,404	2,494
Switzerland	2,089	2,092	2,118	2,158	2,233	2,250	2,308	2,369	2,375
Togo	2,478	2,472	2,434	2,317	2,341	2,335	2,346	2,269	2,213
Georgia							1,873	2,051	2,162
Indonesia								1,888	2,012

== Employment and income ==
Unemployment, youth ages 15–24; total: 15.8%.

male: 16.2%
female: 15.3% (2018 est.)

== Education ==
Literacy; Definition: age 15 and over can read and write (2003 est.)

Total population: 99%
Male: 99%
Female: 99%

School life expectancy (primary to tertiary education); total: 20 years

male: 19 years
female: 21 years (2018)

== Origin groups ==
Belgians with a Belgian background in Brussels

Belgium does not collect data on ethnicity or race, but does collect data on the country of origin of citizens.

The largest group of immigrants and their descendants in Belgium are Italian Belgians, with more than 450,000 people, which is well over 4% of Belgium's total population. The Moroccan Belgians are the third-largest group, and the largest Muslim ethnic group, numbering 340,359. According to Michèle Tribalat in the beginning of 2020, people of foreign background and their descendants were estimated to have formed 32.1% of the total population. According to Statbel, 63.4% of the Belgian population was Belgian with a Belgian background in 2026. The Belgian background by age group was 50.8% among those under 18, 60.2% among 18-64-year-olds and 84.5% among those aged 65 and over.

Of these 'New Belgians', 49.3% are of non-Belgian European ancestry and 50.7% are from non-Western countries.

The rest consists mostly of French-speaking people from Brussels, Turks, Kurds, Dutch, French, Portuguese, Spaniards, Greeks, Bosniaks, Algerians, Congolese, Vietnamese, Poles, Indians, and Guineans (around 23% of Belgium's population is of non-Belgian origin). Approximately 30,000 Roma live in Belgium.

The exact number of French-speakers in Brussels is hard to determine, but it is estimated that 85% of the people living in Brussels use French and 10% use Dutch in their households, as the sole language or secondary language, while Arabic is also largely spoken. See the Brussels article for more details.

In the table are the top 30 countries by origin of the population of Belgium in 2020

Group of origin	Year											
Group of origin	2001		2006		2011		2016		2023		2026	
Group of origin	Number	%	Number	%	Number	%	Number	%	Number	%	Number	%
Belgians with Belgian background	8,394,413	81.8%	8,252,547	78.5%	8,132,782	74.3%	7,966,385	70.7%	7,665,100	65.5%	7,522,691	63.4%
Belgians with foreign background (Note: The number includes Belgian nationals who either previously were foreign nationals themselves or at least one of their parents was a foreign national.)	1,007,316	9.8%	1,358,362	12.9%	1,699,228	15.5%	2,005,865	17.8%	2,459,184	21.0%	2,709,811	22.8%
Neighbouring country (Note: This category includes; Germany; France; Luxembourg; the Netherlands; the United Kingdom;)	265,422	2.6%	299,651		334,500		362,196		398,149	3.4%	414,031	3.5%
Other EU	319,180	3.1%	375,091		429,945		481,977		547,298	4.7%	579,881	4.9%
Other Europe	100,019	1%	160,650		215,141		260,067		316,125	2.7%	342,768	2.9%
Africa	210,601	2.1%	363,476		505,113		639,146		823,402	7%	908,882	7.7%
Asia and Oceania	54,409	0.5%	77,410		106,973		133,603		199,302	1.7%	247,691	2.1%
Other	19,655	0.2%	29,446		40,386		49,113		65,623	0.6%	74,259	0.6%
Not classified	38,030	0.4%	52,638		67,170		79,763		109,285	0.9%	142,299	1.2%
Non-Belgians	861,685	8.4%	900,473	8.6%	1,119,256	10.2%	1,295,660	11.5%	1,573,273	13.4%	1,635,132	13.8%
Neighbouring country (Note: This category includes; Germany; France; Luxembourg; the Netherlands; the United Kingdom;)	257,981	2.5%	289,826		336,102		360,731		383,151	3.3%	385,105	3.2%
Other EU	313,827	3.1%	314,549		387,389		481,218		569,989	4.9%	571,382	4.8%
Other Europe	68,323	0.7%	67,277		87,645		83,783		144,633	1.2%	163,671	1.4%
Africa	153,603	1.5%	139,458		182,605		207,957		234,162	2%	239,707	2%
Asia and Oceania	30,609	0.3%	44,866		64,238		93,839		149,313	1.3%	163,918	1.4%
Other	23,155	0.2%	26,355		33,904		39,605		47,547	0.4%	50,706	0.4%
Not classified	14,187	0.1%	18,142		27,373		28,527		44,478	0.4%	60,643	0.5%
Total	10,263,414	100%	10,511,382	100%	10,951,266	100%	11,267,910	100%	11,697,557	100%	11,867,634	100%

Place of Birth	Year	
Place of Birth	2011	
Place of Birth	Number	%
Place of birth in reporting country	9,371,282	
Place of birth not in reporting country	1,517,608	
Other EU Member State	765,523	
Outside EU but within Europe	25,764	
Outside Europe/ Non-European	752,085	
Africa	418,576	
Asia	239,474	
North America	20,488	
Caribbean, South or Central America	45,650	
Total	11,000,638	100%

Countries of origin of Belgian population (2020)
Country	Number (2020)	% of population of foreign origin	% of total population
Morocco	340,359	13.3%	3.0%
(European Union) Italy	278,877	11.1%	2.4%
(European Union) France	217,200	8.7%	1.9%
(European Union) Netherlands	190,271	7.3%	1.7%
Turkey	161,581	6.2%	1.4%
(European Union) Romania	120,929	4.8%	1.1%
(European Union) Poland	97,183	3.9%	0.8%
(European Union) Spain	78,745	3.1%	0.7%
Democratic Republic of the Congo	65,687	2.7%	0.6%
Russia	62,059	2.5%	0.5%
(European Union) Portugal	54,719	2.1%	0.5%
(European Union) Germany	50,772	2.0%	0.4%
(European Union) Bulgaria	46,876	1.9%	0.4%
Syria	35,626	1.4%	0.3%
Algeria	31,956	1.2%	0.3%
United Kingdom	29,504	1.1%	0.3%
(European Union) Greece	28,643	1.1%	0.2%
India	27,267	1.0%	0.2%
Afghanistan	25,727	1.0%	0.2%
Cameroon	24,267	0.9%	0.2%
China	22,283	0.9%	0.2%
Tunisia	20,921	0.8%	0.2%
Iraq	20,882	0.8%	0.2%
Guinea	19,244	0.7%	0.2%
Brazil	15,158	0.6%	0.1%
Rwanda	14,729	0.6%	0.1%
Pakistan	14,580	0.6%	0.1%
United States	13,820	0.5%	0.1%
Iran	12,891	0.5%	0.1%
Albania	12,641	0.5%	0.1%
Senegal	11,876	0.5%	0.1%
Other countries	414,327	16.2%	3.6%
Total	2,549,724	100%	22.2%

== Naturalisation ==
Foreign nationals can only apply for Belgian nationality after 5 years of legal residence in Belgium. The requirements for Belgium nationality are You have been legally resident in Belgium for at least 5 years, You have a right to remain indefinitely, You are integrated in Belgium, for example you have a certificate of integration, You speak and write 1 of the 3 national languages, and You have already worked at least 468 days. Since the year 2000 there has been 910,067 naturalised persons.

Naturalisation Data by Continent (2000–2024)
Continent	Naturalised Persons	Percentage of Total
Africa	380,010	39.2%
Europe	367,035	37.8%
Asia	147,920	15.2%
Other	41,433	4.3%
Americas	33,285	3.4%
Oceania	492	0.1%
Total	970,175	100%

Main Nationalities Granted Belgian Citizenship (2000–2025)
Rank	Country	Number of Naturalised Persons
1	Morocco	201,975
2	Turkey	90,415
3	Italy	53,912
4	Democratic Republic of the Congo	43,180
5	Romania	34,579
6	Poland	26,685
7	France	25,157
8	Netherlands	24,845
9	Syria	24,957
10	Russia	24,034
11	Afghanistan	20,579
12	Cameroon	18,356
13	Algeria	18,173
14	Iraq	16,516
15	Guinea	14,610

== Languages ==
Belgium's three official languages are Dutch, spoken by about 60% of the population, French, spoken by about 40%, and German, spoken by less than 1%. The vast majority of Belgium's population, 99%, is literate as defined by the Belgian government, i.e. capable of reading and writing in an official language by the time a citizen has reached the age of 15. English is the official (meetings) language of the European Commission, which is 10% of the job market in Brussels.

== Religion ==
According to the European Social Survey in 2023, people who did not belong to a religion comprised 59% of the Belgian population. The share of Christians was 34%, with Catholicism being the largest denomination at 31% of the population. Protestants and other Christians comprised 2% and Orthodox Christians comprised 1%. Islam is the second largest religion with 6% of the population being Muslim.

In 2012, 58% of Belgians identified as Catholic. Other Christians were 7% of the population. In 2012, Muslims were 5%. 27% of Belgians are agnostics, atheists or otherwise irreligious.

== See also ==
- Belgian nationality law
- Metropolitan areas in Belgium
- Demographics of Brussels
- Demographics of France
- Demographics of Germany
- Demographics of Luxembourg
- Demographics of the Netherlands
