= List of countries by past and projected future population density =

This is a list of countries showing past and projected future population density, ranging from 1950 to 2100, as estimated by the 2017 revision of the World Population Prospects database by the United Nations Population Division. The population density equals the number of human inhabitants per square kilometer of land area.

== Past (1950–2020) ==
* indicates "Demographics of COUNTRY or TERRITORY" links.

Population density (persons per square km), as of 1 July
Country (or area)	1950	1960	1970	1980	1990	2000	2015	2024
Afghanistan *	11.9	13.8	17.0	20.3	18.8	30.8	44.1	58.3
Albania *	46.1	59.7	78.5	97.9	119.8	113.9	107.3	107.4
Algeria *	3.7	4.7	6.1	8.1	10.9	13.1	15.2	18.2
American Samoa * (USA)	94.7	100.1	136.5	162.3	235.2	287.6	278.2	279.0
Andorra *	13.2	28.5	51.7	76.7	116.0	139.1	179.7	164.2
Angola *	3.6	4.5	5.4	7.2	9.8	13.2	18.7	26.3
Anguilla * (UK)	56.9	65.2	71.1	74.5	92.6	123.0	153.0	169.8
Antigua and Barbuda *	105.2	125.8	152.5	166.9	151.6	190.0	215.1	238.9
Argentina *	6.3	7.5	8.8	10.3	12.0	13.5	15.1	16.6
Armenia *	47.5	65.8	88.7	108.9	124.3	107.8	101.1	103.2
Aruba * (Netherlands)	211.5	301.2	328.1	333.9	345.3	504.7	564.8	591.3
Australia *	1.1	1.3	1.7	1.9	2.2	2.5	2.9	3.3
Austria *	84.2	85.8	91.2	92.3	93.7	97.9	102.1	106.6
Azerbaijan *	35.4	47.1	62.7	74.4	87.6	98.3	109.3	122.2
Bahamas *	7.9	10.9	16.9	21.0	25.6	29.8	36.0	40.6
Bahrain *	152.1	213.7	279.7	473.5	652.5	874.5	1,632.7	2,233.9
Bangladesh *	291.1	370.3	499.7	625.9	815.8	1,010.8	1,168.8	1,304.3
Barbados *	490.7	537.1	555.5	586.5	605.5	627.6	650.2	668.8
Belarus *	38.2	40.3	44.2	47.5	50.4	49.0	46.7	46.4
Belgium *	285.3	302.8	318.1	325.9	330.5	339.6	361.3	383.8
Belize *	3.0	4.0	5.4	6.3	8.2	10.8	14.1	17.4
Benin *	20.0	21.6	25.8	33.0	44.2	60.9	81.6	107.5
Bermuda * (UK)	745.2	898.9	1,045.7	1,139.8	1,218.6	1,280.6	1,279.1	1,212.8
Bhutan *	4.6	5.9	7.8	10.7	14.1	15.0	19.1	21.9
Bolivia *	2.9	3.4	4.2	5.2	6.3	7.7	9.2	10.7
Bosnia and Herzegovina *	52.2	63.2	73.7	82.0	87.5	73.9	73.0	68.6
Botswana *	0.7	0.9	1.2	1.8	2.4	3.0	3.6	4.3
Brazil *	6.5	8.6	11.4	14.5	17.9	21.0	23.5	25.6
British Virgin Islands * (UK)	49.6	53.6	65.4	73.3	109.7	137.6	181.5	217.6
Brunei *	9.1	15.5	24.6	36.8	49.1	63.2	73.7	84.3
Bulgaria *	66.8	72.6	78.4	81.8	81.4	73.7	68.2	63.9
Burkina Faso *	15.7	17.7	20.6	24.9	32.2	42.4	57.0	76.4
Burundi *	89.9	108.5	134.6	160.3	210.9	249.2	341.4	464.9
Cambodia *	25.1	32.4	39.6	37.9	50.8	68.8	81.1	94.7
Cameroon *	9.1	11.0	13.8	18.2	24.8	32.3	42.2	54.9
Canada *	1.5	2.0	2.4	2.7	3.0	3.4	3.8	4.1
Cayman Islands * (UK)	26.7	32.8	38.1	67.3	104.2	173.7	231.3	266.2
Cape Verde *	44.2	50.2	67.0	71.1	84.8	108.0	124.7	140.8
Central African Republic *	2.1	2.4	2.9	3.7	4.7	6.0	7.1	7.9
Chad *	2.0	2.4	2.9	3.6	4.7	6.6	9.4	12.9
Guernsey and Jersey (UK)	538.1	575.9	637.9	674.8	740.4	782.8	1049.64	882.0
Chile *	8.3	10.4	12.9	15.2	17.8	20.5	22.9	24.8
China *	59.1	70.1	87.9	105.9	124.9	136.7	144.8	151.7
Colombia *	11.1	14.9	19.9	25.0	30.9	36.4	41.4	45.3
Comoros *	85.7	102.7	123.6	165.4	221.2	291.4	370.6	467.3
Cook Islands * (NZ)	62.8	76.1	89.2	73.5	76.5	75.5	77.3	73.0
Costa Rica *	18.8	26.1	36.2	46.8	60.6	76.9	89.0	98.8
Croatia *	68.8	74.9	79.0	82.2	85.4	79.1	77.3	73.6
Cuba *	55.6	67.1	81.9	92.4	99.4	104.8	106.5	108.0
Curaçao * (Netherlands)	225.6	285.9	323.5	333.3	330.3	297.5	332.5	368.2
Cyprus *	53.5	62.0	66.4	74.2	83.0	102.1	120.4	130.7
Czech Republic *	115.3	124.2	127.1	134.0	133.9	133.2	136.4	137.7
Democratic Republic of the Congo	5.4	6.7	8.8	11.6	15.3	20.8	28.5	39.5
Denmark *	100.6	108.0	116.2	120.8	121.2	125.9	130.9	136.6
Djibouti *	2.7	3.6	6.9	15.5	25.5	31.0	36.7	43.1
Dominica *	68.1	80.0	94.8	100.4	94.6	92.9	95.3	100.1
Dominican Republic *	48.9	68.2	93.2	120.2	148.7	177.2	204.8	229.9
Ecuador *	14.0	18.3	24.5	32.1	41.1	50.8	60.1	69.8
Egypt *	20.8	27.1	35.2	44.3	57.7	70.2	84.5	103.4
El Salvador *	106.2	133.3	177.1	221.1	253.6	283.2	297.5	312.7
Equatorial Guinea *	8.0	9.1	10.9	9.1	15.2	21.9	33.9	50.1
Eritrea *	11.3	13.8	17.9	23.6	30.8	33.6	43.5	53.8
Estonia *	26.0	28.7	32.1	34.8	36.9	33.0	31.4	30.7
Eswatini (Swaziland)	15.9	20.3	25.9	35.1	50.1	61.7	69.9	83.7
Ethiopia *	18.1	22.2	28.4	35.3	48.1	66.5	87.7	112.8
Falkland Islands * (UK)	0.2	0.2	0.2	0.2	0.2	0.2	0.2	0.2
Faroe Islands * (Denmark)	22.6	24.8	28.0	31.2	34.1	33.9	34.8	35.7
Federated States of Micronesia	45.7	63.6	87.8	104.2	137.6	153.5	148.0	154.0
Fiji *	15.8	21.5	28.5	34.8	39.9	44.4	47.1	50.6
Finland *	13.2	14.6	15.2	15.8	16.4	17.1	17.7	18.4
France *	76.5	83.8	92.9	98.7	104.0	108.9	115.1	120.0
French Guiana * (France)	0.3	0.4	0.6	0.8	1.4	2.0	2.8	3.7
French Polynesia * (France)	16.5	21.3	30.2	41.5	54.2	64.8	73.2	79.4
Gabon *	1.8	1.9	2.3	2.8	3.7	4.8	6.4	8.3
Gambia *	26.8	36.4	44.2	59.7	90.6	121.7	167.2	226.6
Georgia *	50.8	57.7	67.8	72.2	77.9	68.0	60.9	56.1
Germany *	200.7	210.6	225.4	224.6	227.0	233.8	232.1	236.8
Ghana *	21.9	29.2	37.8	47.5	64.3	83.2	107.7	135.1
Gibraltar * (UK)	2,203.9	2,339.4	2,856.0	3,027.2	2,916.4	3,118.0	3,318.9	3,500.0
Greece *	59.5	64.2	67.2	74.7	79.5	86.4	88.8	90.7
Greenland * (Denmark)	0.1	0.1	0.1	0.1	0.1	0.1	0.1	0.1
Grenada *	225.5	264.3	277.7	261.8	283.2	298.9	307.9	321.5
Guadeloupe * (France)	124.3	162.8	189.0	195.4	228.3	251.3	266.7	265.3
Guam * (USA)	110.5	123.6	155.3	192.8	241.6	287.6	295.3	312.5
Guatemala *	29.1	39.3	52.5	68.0	86.4	108.7	136.5	167.1
Guinea *	12.6	14.6	17.2	18.4	24.6	35.8	43.9	56.0
Guinea-Bissau *	19.0	21.9	25.3	28.5	36.0	44.2	55.3	71.1
Guyana *	2.1	2.9	3.6	4.0	3.8	3.8	3.8	4.0
Haiti *	116.9	140.3	170.9	206.4	257.6	310.2	362.8	412.6
Honduras *	13.8	18.2	24.3	32.9	44.3	58.3	73.2	86.9
Hong Kong * (China)	1,880.0	2,919.2	3,688.7	4,681.4	5,506.2	6,346.3	6,690.7	7,188.2
Hungary *	103.1	110.5	114.5	118.8	114.6	112.9	109.7	106.3
Iceland *	1.4	1.8	2.0	2.3	2.5	2.8	3.2	3.4
India *	126.6	151.2	186.2	234.4	292.7	354.2	414.0	465.2
Indonesia *	38.4	48.5	63.4	81.4	100.2	116.8	133.9	150.3
Iran *	10.5	13.5	17.5	23.7	34.5	40.6	45.8	51.3
Iraq *	13.2	16.8	22.8	31.4	40.2	54.3	70.8	95.6
Ireland *	42.3	41.0	42.8	49.9	51.8	55.9	67.2	71.0
Isle of Man *	96.9	85.0	97.2	111.5	120.1	127.3	140.5	150.7
Israel *	58.1	96.6	131.7	173.0	208.0	277.9	343.2	402.7
Italy *	158.4	169.1	182.2	191.8	194.2	194.8	203.1	201.0
Ivory Coast *	8.3	11.2	16.5	26.1	38.6	52.5	64.2	82.3
Jamaica *	129.5	150.3	173.2	199.7	223.8	245.3	260.1	269.0
Japan *	227.1	257.0	287.8	323.2	341.6	349.8	352.6	347.0
Jordan *	5.4	10.5	19.4	26.7	40.1	57.5	80.9	115.0
Kazakhstan *	2.5	3.7	4.9	5.5	6.1	5.6	6.1	7.0
Kenya *	10.7	14.2	19.8	28.6	41.1	55.3	72.7	94.0
Kiribati *	40.8	50.9	63.2	73.3	89.4	104.2	126.7	151.2
Kuwait *	8.6	15.1	41.9	77.0	117.8	115.1	168.2	241.5
Kyrgyzstan *	9.1	11.3	15.5	18.8	22.8	25.7	28.3	32.9
Laos *	7.3	9.2	11.6	14.1	18.5	23.1	27.1	31.0
Latvia *	31.0	34.2	38.2	40.5	42.8	38.3	34.1	30.4
Lebanon *	130.5	176.4	224.6	254.7	264.2	316.3	424.0	588.4
Lesotho *	24.2	28.0	34.0	43.2	52.8	61.6	67.2	76.5
Liberia *	9.7	11.6	14.7	19.6	21.8	29.9	41.0	53.0
Libya *	0.6	0.8	1.2	1.8	2.5	3.0	3.5	3.8
Liechtenstein *	86.0	103.1	132.9	161.7	179.7	208.0	225.0	241.5
Lithuania *	41.0	44.2	50.0	54.7	59.0	55.9	49.8	45.5
Luxembourg *	114.3	121.5	131.1	140.6	147.4	168.4	196.1	233.2
Macau * (China)	6,571.3	5,611.9	8,233.9	7,963.8	11,502.8	14,313.7	17,958.8	21,801.8
North Macedonia *	49.7	59.0	68.2	76.3	79.2	80.7	82.1	82.8
Madagascar *	7.0	8.8	11.3	15.0	19.9	27.1	36.4	47.6
Malawi *	31.3	38.4	48.8	65.4	100.1	120.7	160.9	215.1
Malaysia *	18.6	24.8	32.9	42.0	54.9	70.6	85.6	100.0
Maldives *	245.7	299.6	385.9	528.0	744.0	934.6	1,215.0	1,529.7
Mali *	3.9	4.3	4.9	5.8	6.9	9.0	12.4	16.6
Malta *	975.0	973.5	1,000.3	1,041.5	1,138.8	1,239.6	1,300.3	1,357.4
Marshall Islands *	72.2	81.5	113.3	169.9	262.8	289.8	291.2	295.8
Martinique * (France)	209.4	265.7	306.6	307.0	338.2	365.1	372.6	363.6
Mauritania *	0.6	0.8	1.1	1.5	2.0	2.6	3.5	4.6
Mauritius *	243.0	325.1	407.1	475.9	520.1	583.8	614.8	627.6
Mayotte * (France)	40.4	64.0	98.6	147.0	252.8	400.9	556.6	728.3
Mexico *	14.4	19.6	26.8	35.7	43.9	52.3	60.4	68.9
Moldova *	71.3	91.4	109.4	122.1	132.8	127.9	124.3	122.3
Monaco *	13,420.1	15,068.5	15,761.1	17,949.7	19,757.7	21,531.5	24,895.3	26,373.8
Mongolia *	0.5	0.6	0.8	1.1	1.4	1.5	1.7	2.1
Montenegro *	29.3	36.2	38.6	43.2	45.7	45.6	46.4	46.8
Montserrat * (UK)	135.2	121.0	116.2	119.2	107.3	49.6	49.4	52.4
Morocco *	20.1	27.6	35.9	44.9	55.7	64.6	72.6	83.1
Mozambique *	7.8	9.4	11.7	15.1	16.8	23.0	30.8	41.1
Myanmar *	26.3	32.1	40.4	51.1	62.2	70.6	76.8	83.9
Namibia *	0.6	0.7	0.9	1.2	1.7	2.3	2.6	3.3
Nauru *	147.7	221.6	324.8	374.4	457.8	501.8	501.2	561.4
Nepal *	59.2	70.2	83.7	104.0	130.8	165.6	188.5	211.1
Netherlands *	297.8	339.5	385.6	419.6	443.8	472.3	494.7	509.5
New Caledonia * (France)	3.5	4.3	5.8	7.9	9.3	11.6	13.7	15.7
New Zealand *	7.2	9.0	10.7	12.0	12.9	14.7	16.6	18.4
Nicaragua *	10.8	14.7	19.9	27.0	34.4	41.8	47.7	53.3
Niger *	2.0	2.7	3.6	4.7	6.3	9.0	13.0	19.0
Nigeria *	41.6	49.6	61.5	80.7	104.6	134.3	174.1	226.3
Niue * (NZ)	18.0	18.6	19.8	13.1	9.0	7.3	6.3	6.3
North Korea *	87.6	94.9	119.7	145.1	168.5	190.4	204.2	214.6
Northern Mariana Islands * (USA)	15.2	21.8	28.5	36.8	92.5	150.2	118.3	120.3
Norway *	8.9	9.8	10.6	11.2	11.6	12.3	13.4	14.9
Oman *	1.5	1.8	2.3	3.7	5.9	7.3	9.8	16.6
Pakistan *	48.7	58.3	75.4	101.3	139.7	179.7	221.3	270.3
Palau *	16.2	21.0	25.0	26.5	32.8	41.7	44.5	48.8
Palestine	154.8	177.6	186.8	250.7	349.0	535.4	675.6	884.2
Panama *	11.6	15.2	20.4	26.6	33.2	40.8	49.0	57.7
Papua New Guinea *	3.7	4.4	5.6	7.3	9.5	12.3	15.7	19.3
Paraguay *	3.7	4.8	6.2	8.0	10.6	13.3	15.6	17.8
Peru *	6.0	7.9	10.4	13.6	17.1	20.2	22.9	26.0
Philippines *	62.3	88.1	120.1	159.0	207.8	261.6	314.3	367.9
Poland *	81.1	96.7	106.6	116.0	123.9	125.9	125.1	123.9
Portugal *	91.9	97.1	95.0	107.1	108.7	113.1	116.3	111.6
Puerto Rico * (USA)	250.1	265.6	305.5	359.4	396.6	428.1	419.0	411.6
Qatar *	2.2	4.1	9.4	19.3	41.0	51.0	153.3	240.5
Republic of the Congo	2.4	3.0	4.0	5.4	7.1	9.4	12.8	16.7
Réunion * (France)	99.2	134.3	184.8	203.7	244.2	294.7	332.2	358.6
Romania *	70.5	80.9	89.3	98.2	102.1	96.1	88.8	84.2
Russia *	6.3	7.3	7.9	8.4	9.0	8.9	8.7	8.8
Rwanda *	88.6	118.9	152.2	208.4	293.3	325.3	415.4	530.5
Saint Helena (UK)	12.7	12.2	12.5	13.7	14.2	13.1	10.7	10.6
Saint Kitts and Nevis *	177.1	196.9	172.6	166.2	157.1	174.5	197.9	218.5
Saint Lucia *	135.7	147.4	170.8	193.4	226.5	257.3	282.9	297.1
Saint Pierre and Miquelon * (France)	19.9	21.4	23.7	26.1	27.3	27.3	27.3	27.9
Saint Vincent and the Grenadines	171.8	207.6	231.9	257.7	275.7	276.7	280.3	284.0
Samoa *	29.0	38.4	50.6	55.0	57.5	61.7	65.8	70.7
San Marino *	213.0	256.6	319.0	356.0	400.7	457.0	518.5	563.5
São Tomé and Príncipe	62.5	66.9	77.3	98.9	118.6	144.4	182.1	227.1
Saudi Arabia *	1.5	1.9	2.7	4.5	7.6	9.7	12.8	16.1
Senegal *	12.9	16.7	22.1	29.0	39.2	51.3	67.1	89.3
Serbia *	77.0	86.4	92.8	101.9	108.8	108.5	103.2	99.5
Seychelles *	79.0	90.3	113.8	144.1	153.5	176.4	198.7	208.9
Sierra Leone *	28.3	31.8	37.3	46.6	59.7	63.2	89.5	111.5
Singapore *	1,460.1	2,333.0	2,960.4	3,445.3	4,304.2	5,591.4	7,248.9	8,478.6
Sint Maarten * (Netherlands)	44.1	83.3	201.9	385.2	839.7	935.9	974.2	1,216.6
Slovakia *	71.5	86.1	94.4	103.9	110.0	112.3	112.4	113.4
Slovenia *	73.1	78.8	82.9	91.2	99.6	98.7	101.5	103.4
Solomon Islands *	3.2	4.2	5.7	8.2	11.1	14.7	18.9	23.1
Somalia *	3.6	4.4	5.5	10.1	11.8	14.4	19.2	25.7
South Africa *	11.2	14.4	18.8	24.5	31.0	37.7	42.5	48.4
South Korea *	197.6	260.6	331.3	391.3	441.5	487.4	509.6	529.7
South Sudan *	4.2	4.8	6.0	7.7	9.4	11.0	16.5	22.3
Spain *	56.3	61.1	68.1	75.8	78.8	82.0	93.8	93.1
Sri Lanka *	127.1	157.5	199.1	239.8	276.3	299.5	322.1	336.2
Sudan *	3.2	4.3	5.8	8.2	11.4	15.4	19.5	24.7
Suriname *	1.4	1.9	2.4	2.3	2.6	3.0	3.4	3.7
Sweden *	17.1	18.2	19.6	20.3	20.9	21.6	22.9	24.7
Switzerland *	118.1	134.0	156.1	159.5	168.9	181.4	198.2	219.4
Syria *	18.6	24.9	34.6	48.6	67.8	89.4	114.5	103.1
Tajikistan *	10.9	14.9	20.9	27.9	37.8	44.4	54.6	67.7
Taiwan *	215.3	302.2	414.9	500.3	573.6	616.8	652.4	672.6
Tanzania *	8.6	11.4	15.4	21.1	28.7	38.6	52.0	70.9
Thailand *	40.5	53.6	72.2	92.8	110.8	123.2	131.6	135.9
Timor-Leste *	29.1	33.6	40.7	39.5	50.6	58.6	74.6	92.9
Togo *	25.7	29.1	38.9	50.0	69.6	91.4	119.6	154.2
Tokelau * (NZ)	156.6	187.3	162.1	155.3	160.8	155.4	114.0	135.7
Tonga *	65.6	85.6	117.2	129.2	132.2	136.2	144.6	154.2
Trinidad and Tobago *	125.9	165.4	184.4	211.6	238.2	247.2	258.9	268.6
Tunisia *	23.2	26.9	32.6	41.0	53.0	62.4	68.5	76.6
Turkey *	27.8	35.7	45.3	57.1	70.1	82.2	94.0	108.9
Turkmenistan *	2.6	3.4	4.7	6.1	7.8	9.6	10.8	12.8
Turks and Caicos Islands * (UK)	5.3	6.0	5.9	7.9	12.2	19.9	32.6	38.9
Tuvalu *	172.2	203.5	243.4	268.4	300.1	314.0	351.0	383.3
Uganda *	25.8	34.0	47.3	62.8	87.3	120.3	169.7	236.2
Ukraine *	64.4	73.6	81.3	86.3	88.8	84.3	79.0	75.2
United Arab Emirates *	0.8	1.1	2.8	12.5	22.3	37.7	98.9	117.4
Great Britain *	209.2	216.7	230.0	232.6	236.4	243.7	261.7	278.3
United States *	17.4	20.4	22.9	25.1	27.6	30.8	33.7	36.2
U.S. Virgin Islands * (USA)	76.6	94.7	184.9	283.1	296.4	310.6	303.3	299.6
Uruguay *	12.8	14.5	16.1	16.7	17.8	19.0	19.3	20.0
Uzbekistan *	14.7	20.1	28.5	37.5	48.1	58.4	67.2	78.1
Vanuatu *	3.9	5.2	7.0	9.5	12.0	15.2	19.4	24.1
Vatican City *	2,063.6	2,059.1	1,463.6	1,645.5	1,745.5	1,784.1	1,804.5	1,820.5
Venezuela *	6.2	9.2	13.1	17.4	22.5	27.8	32.9	37.6
Vietnam *	80.0	105.4	140.0	175.4	220.0	258.9	285.3	317.2
Wallis and Futuna * (France)	50.0	61.1	63.2	80.2	99.1	103.6	95.9	82.5
Western Sahara *	0.1	0.1	0.3	0.6	0.8	1.2	1.8	2.2
Yemen *	8.3	9.8	11.7	15.4	22.8	33.9	44.7	57.3
Zambia *	3.1	4.1	5.6	7.9	10.8	14.2	18.6	25.1
Zimbabwe *	7.1	9.7	13.4	18.5	26.3	31.6	36.4	45.7

== Future (2030–2100) ==
* indicates "Demographics of COUNTRY or TERRITORY" links.

Population density (persons per square km), as of 1 July
Country/dependent territory	2030	2040	2050	2075	2100
Afghanistan *	71.5	84.1	94.9	110.0	107.8
Albania *	107.1	103.4	97.2	78.8	60.5
Algeria *	20.5	22.4	24.1	26.1	26.3
American Samoa * (USA)	285.7	289.7	283.8	254.3	201.3
Andorra *	166.3	167.1	164.2	142.9	134.3
Angola *	35.9	47.5	61.0	99.8	138.7
Anguilla * (UK)	176.3	177.3	173.9	156.3	139.1
Antigua and Barbuda *	260.5	276.1	284.6	289.2	279.5
Argentina *	18.0	19.2	20.2	21.4	21.1
Armenia *	102.1	99.0	94.8	79.5	64.9
Aruba * (Netherlands)	607.6	608.0	592.2	567.9	534.4
Australia *	3.7	4.0	4.3	5.0	5.4
Austria *	108.6	108.8	107.7	102.7	99.4
Azerbaijan *	129.2	132.9	133.6	125.6	115.6
Bahamas *	43.9	46.1	47.4	48.2	46.7
Bahrain *	2,648.9	2,901.6	3,062.0	3,210.0	2,955.6
Bangladesh *	1,425.7	1,508.0	1,551.3	1,508.6	1,333.2
Barbados *	674.4	667.1	651.9	618.4	593.3
Belarus *	45.2	43.6	42.2	39.0	37.5
Belgium *	396.4	406.0	412.4	421.1	430.1
Belize *	20.7	23.6	26.0	29.6	30.2
Benin *	138.6	173.9	212.2	310.9	393.1
Bermuda * (UK)	1,185.5	1,137.3	1,067.6	934.2	826.7
Bhutan *	24.0	25.3	26.1	25.2	22.5
Bolivia *	12.1	13.5	14.7	16.4	16.6
Bosnia and Herzegovina *	66.8	63.7	60.0	50.8	43.5
Botswana *	4.9	5.5	6.0	6.7	6.7
Brazil *	27.0	27.7	27.8	26.0	22.8
British Virgin Islands * (UK)	235.2	245.5	250.5	246.7	235.8
Brunei *	92.9	98.7	101.8	99.4	92.3
Bulgaria *	59.2	54.3	50.0	40.5	35.5
Burkina Faso *	100.1	127.8	157.9	235.6	298.7
Burundi *	615.2	793.5	1,003.2	1,578.3	2,122.8
Cambodia *	106.5	116.7	124.7	132.9	128.9
Cameroon *	69.8	86.8	105.4	153.5	193.9
Canada *	4.5	4.7	4.9	5.4	5.7
Cayman Islands * (UK)	296.1	320.9	339.5	380.9	412.1
Cape Verde *	157.6	171.8	182.2	189.7	177.2
Central African Republic *	9.8	12.0	14.2	19.4	22.6
Chad *	17.0	21.7	26.7	39.3	49.0
Guernsey and Jersey (UK)	916.8	940.3	950.7	950.8	945.0
Chile *	26.4	27.4	27.9	27.2	25.2
China *	153.5	151.0	145.3	124.8	108.7
Colombia *	47.9	49.2	49.3	45.9	40.4
Comoros *	570.5	678.1	786.0	1,020.1	1,161.2
Cook Islands * (NZ)	74.4	74.8	74.8	72.0	65.1
Costa Rica *	106.1	110.8	113.1	109.2	98.5
Croatia *	69.6	65.8	61.8	52.2	45.0
Cuba *	108.0	105.8	101.7	86.7	76.3
Curaçao * (Netherlands)	387.8	400.2	408.3	423.2	424.3
Cyprus *	138.8	145.2	149.7	150.2	143.2
Czech Republic *	136.3	132.9	130.2	119.5	115.1
DR Congo *	53.1	69.3	87.1	132.4	167.2
Denmark *	142.0	145.9	148.8	156.3	160.6
Djibouti *	48.9	53.4	56.4	58.0	54.5
Dominica *	103.5	103.7	102.3	91.1	75.9
Dominican Republic *	250.4	265.5	274.5	274.1	250.7
Ecuador *	78.7	86.4	92.5	99.9	97.9
Egypt *	120.3	137.7	154.1	184.1	199.7
El Salvador *	327.5	336.0	337.7	314.6	260.8
Equatorial Guinea *	66.7	83.7	101.4	142.3	169.0
Eritrea *	66.5	80.7	95.1	126.6	146.3
Estonia *	29.6	28.3	27.0	23.4	21.0
Eswatini (Swaziland)	96.9	109.4	121.0	139.7	142.9
Ethiopia *	139.6	166.1	190.9	235.6	249.5
Falkland Islands * (UK)	0.2	0.2	0.2	0.2	0.2
Faroe Islands * (Denmark)	37.3	38.7	39.4	40.8	41.0
Federated States of Micronesia	167.8	177.8	183.1	180.3	158.0
Fiji *	53.1	54.4	54.6	51.7	46.3
Finland *	18.9	19.1	19.3	19.9	20.2
France *	124.0	127.2	129.0	132.2	135.6
French Guiana * (France)	4.6	5.6	6.6	8.9	10.6
French Polynesia * (France)	83.8	87.4	89.0	86.7	79.8
Gabon *	10.1	11.8	13.6	17.3	19.4
Gambia *	296.5	373.2	450.8	618.7	709.5
Georgia *	53.9	51.5	48.8	41.9	36.6
Germany *	235.8	232.7	227.3	213.5	203.8
Ghana *	163.9	194.3	225.3	293.2	337.3
Gibraltar * (UK)	3,589.7	3,652.6	3,705.3	3,729.1	3,727.2
Greece *	91.2	92.6	97.4	99.1	101.6
Greenland * (Denmark)	0.1	0.1	0.1	0.1	0.1
Grenada *	329.5	329.3	322.3	270.0	206.6
Guadeloupe * (France)	265.0	261.9	251.4	224.5	201.8
Guam * (USA)	335.2	350.3	356.8	353.6	327.2
Guatemala *	197.9	226.4	251.7	293.4	298.8
Guinea *	71.8	89.8	109.3	158.2	196.7
Guinea-Bissau *	88.6	107.8	128.1	175.6	209.8
Guyana *	4.2	4.2	4.2	3.7	3.0
Haiti *	455.2	488.2	509.5	509.5	465.9
Honduras *	99.6	110.3	118.4	126.6	120.1
Hong Kong * (China)	7,606.9	7,808.6	7,860.1	7,823.5	7,903.5
Hungary *	102.0	96.7	91.4	79.0	70.6
Iceland *	3.6	3.8	3.9	3.9	3.8
India *	508.9	539.9	558.0	554.4	510.1
Indonesia *	163.2	172.3	177.5	177.8	168.9
Iran *	54.6	56.4	57.4	51.8	44.5
Iraq *	122.7	153.7	187.6	277.0	358.2
Ireland *	75.8	80.3	84.2	88.7	92.7
Isle of Man *	159.1	165.9	170.8	179.0	183.7
Israel *	461.4	521.3	581.2	706.4	791.3
Italy *	197.6	193.4	187.3	169.4	162.6
Ivory Coast *	104.8	131.4	161.6	245.3	325.7
Jamaica *	270.8	263.9	249.6	194.4	132.5
Japan *	333.5	316.0	298.4	256.4	231.9
Jordan *	125.3	142.8	159.8	187.0	195.1
Kazakhstan *	7.5	8.0	8.5	9.2	9.5
Kenya *	117.7	142.8	167.7	220.9	249.7
Kiribati *	174.7	196.7	219.9	267.8	300.2
Kuwait *	273.5	298.8	316.7	338.8	349.7
Kyrgyzstan *	36.5	39.6	42.3	45.8	46.2
Laos *	34.9	37.8	39.7	39.7	35.5
Latvia *	28.1	26.1	24.4	20.6	18.5
Lebanon *	524.8	527.1	529.0	494.8	425.2
Lesotho *	85.9	95.6	105.5	123.4	128.6
Liberia *	67.4	84.0	101.8	147.4	184.8
Libya *	4.2	4.4	4.6	4.5	4.2
Liechtenstein *	255.7	264.9	269.4	277.9	288.0
Lithuania *	43.4	40.8	38.4	33.5	30.4
Luxembourg *	260.6	285.1	307.3	352.9	387.9
Macau * (China)	24,946.8	27,313.5	29,282.4	32,721.4	35,195.2
North Macedonia *	82.3	79.9	76.6	66.4	58.2
Madagascar *	61.2	76.3	92.5	134.0	168.4
Malawi *	281.9	358.9	442.4	650.4	803.0
Malaysia *	112.1	120.7	127.0	132.6	127.2
Maldives *	1,705.9	1,823.2	1,921.4	1,881.4	1,655.0
Mali *	22.2	28.8	36.1	54.4	68.2
Malta *	1,374.9	1,347.3	1,310.1	1,204.5	1,100.6
Marshall Islands *	309.1	343.7	365.9	405.5	399.6
Martinique * (France)	360.5	352.2	335.0	292.5	265.7
Mauritania *	5.9	7.3	8.7	12.2	15.1
Mauritius *	634.0	625.2	601.5	531.5	458.9
Mayotte * (France)	916.8	1,120.9	1,321.3	1,741.8	1,983.6
Mexico *	75.9	81.1	84.5	84.9	77.9
Moldova *	117.0	109.1	100.2	75.8	59.4
Monaco *	27,759.7	29,185.9	30,661.1	35,428.2	40,305.4
Mongolia *	2.3	2.5	2.6	2.8	2.9
Montenegro *	46.4	45.4	43.7	38.6	33.4
Montserrat * (UK)	54.0	54.6	53.9	50.5	46.8
Morocco *	91.6	97.9	102.3	104.4	98.2
Mozambique *	54.0	69.2	86.2	131.9	171.7
Myanmar *	90.2	94.1	95.5	91.9	83.8
Namibia *	3.9	4.6	5.3	6.5	7.1
Nauru *	572.7	576.1	566.8	518.6	466.0
Nepal *	231.4	244.6	251.9	243.3	204.5
Netherlands *	521.8	524.9	519.5	504.1	488.7
New Caledonia * (France)	17.6	19.2	20.7	23.1	24.0
New Zealand *	19.8	20.9	21.7	23.0	23.3
Nicaragua *	58.6	62.7	65.4	65.5	58.6
Niger *	27.6	39.3	54.0	101.3	151.7
Nigeria *	289.9	365.8	450.9	677.5	871.7
Niue * (NZ)	6.4	6.7	6.9	7.0	6.7
North Korea *	222.1	224.5	222.6	210.7	195.8
Northern Mariana Islands * (USA)	123.4	122.2	114.1	97.3	77.6
Norway *	16.3	17.5	18.6	20.8	22.2
Oman *	19.1	20.5	21.8	22.9	21.2
Pakistan *	316.8	360.0	398.2	452.0	456.5
Palau *	53.8	57.5	60.0	63.1	62.2
Palestine	1,119.4	1,363.5	1,612.0	2,162.7	2,510.7
Panama *	65.7	72.6	78.4	86.6	88.0
Papua New Guinea *	23.2	27.0	30.6	38.0	41.9
Paraguay *	19.7	21.3	22.4	23.1	21.7
Peru *	28.8	30.9	32.5	33.6	31.9
Philippines *	420.5	467.7	507.4	569.4	580.4
Poland *	119.6	113.2	105.8	85.0	69.4
Portugal *	107.8	103.7	98.2	82.3	72.1
Puerto Rico * (USA)	405.0	391.7	370.0	299.7	229.4
Qatar *	278.4	304.6	325.0	350.7	342.1
Republic of the Congo	21.4	27.3	33.7	51.8	69.0
Réunion * (France)	382.8	399.5	405.4	397.2	375.1
Romania *	80.2	75.9	71.2	60.0	52.5
Russia *	8.6	8.3	8.1	7.6	7.6
Rwanda *	649.5	772.8	887.2	1,087.7	1,142.5
Saint Helena (UK)	11.0	11.0	10.7	10.1	9.0
Saint Kitts and Nevis *	233.1	241.3	243.8	231.9	212.8
Saint Lucia *	305.5	306.0	298.8	258.9	209.9
Saint Pierre and Miquelon * (France)	29.9	31.4	32.1	32.1	30.8
Saint Vincent and the Grenadines *	287.5	287.2	280.5	244.1	198.2
Samoa *	74.9	81.2	86.0	94.1	94.7
San Marino *	578.1	582.8	578.4	551.4	537.2
São Tomé and Príncipe	279.7	337.3	395.6	532.2	632.7
Saudi Arabia *	18.4	19.9	21.0	21.4	20.5
Senegal *	114.9	144.3	176.8	261.2	336.6
Serbia *	95.5	90.5	85.1	72.6	62.5
Seychelles *	213.1	213.4	210.1	190.6	174.6
Sierra Leone *	134.7	158.0	179.7	218.6	228.5
Singapore *	9,060.7	9,375.8	9,392.5	8,702.2	7,759.9
Sint Maarten * (Netherlands)	1,353.9	1,455.4	1,536.4	1,706.3	1,845.8
Slovakia *	112.0	108.0	103.2	89.2	79.7
Slovenia *	102.2	99.7	96.4	86.5	82.5
Solomon Islands *	27.6	32.3	36.9	46.6	52.1
Somalia *	34.3	44.9	57.1	92.4	125.9
South Africa *	53.1	56.9	60.0	63.8	63.1
South Korea *	542.0	539.0	518.9	448.1	398.1
South Sudan *	28.2	34.7	41.5	58.1	70.0
Spain *	92.5	91.3	89.0	77.9	72.9
Sri Lanka *	342.4	341.2	331.6	288.8	239.8
Sudan *	31.1	38.2	45.5	63.9	78.6
Suriname *	4.0	4.1	4.2	4.0	3.7
Sweden *	26.1	27.2	28.3	30.8	32.7
Switzerland *	232.9	242.6	250.0	259.5	265.3
Syria *	144.9	167.7	185.3	209.8	207.8
Tajikistan *	80.0	92.0	103.8	125.1	135.2
Taiwan *	682.0	673.0	643.1	547.1	476.9
Tanzania *	94.5	123.1	155.9	249.9	343.0
Thailand *	136.3	133.8	128.0	108.9	93.0
Timor-Leste *	114.6	138.5	162.8	221.4	258.8
Togo *	193.2	236.5	281.3	388.0	464.2
Tokelau * (NZ)	144.4	150.2	156.2	161.4	149.6
Tonga *	168.1	183.2	194.3	215.1	219.7
Trinidad and Tobago *	267.8	261.9	252.5	218.4	191.6
Tunisia *	82.7	86.5	89.4	89.5	85.7
Turkey *	114.9	116.8	114.3	112.9	108.5
Turkmenistan *	14.4	15.7	16.8	17.9	17.7
Turks and Caicos Islands * (UK)	43.7	47.7	50.4	53.9	55.2
Tuvalu *	423.3	458.1	486.0	553.0	586.0
Uganda *	319.5	418.4	529.0	823.7	1,069.8
Ukraine *	71.1	66.7	62.9	53.6	48.7
United Arab Emirates *	132.2	146.0	157.5	173.7	176.8
Great Britain *	291.7	302.3	311.6	325.8	334.7
United States *	38.8	40.9	42.6	46.5	48.9
U.S. Virgin Islands * (USA)	291.2	275.2	254.0	205.0	159.3
Uruguay *	20.5	20.9	20.9	20.1	18.5
Uzbekistan *	86.3	92.3	96.3	96.1	89.7
Vanuatu *	29.0	34.1	38.9	49.2	55.3
Vatican City *	1,811.4	1,813.6	1,831.8	1,829.5	1,813.6
Venezuela *	41.7	44.9	47.1	49.2	47.2
Vietnam *	342.8	358.7	369.7	365.9	347.2
Wallis and Futuna * (France)	80.2	79.1	77.6	73.4	66.9
Western Sahara *	2.8	3.3	3.7	4.5	4.8
Yemen *	69.7	81.4	91.5	103.9	101.4
Zambia *	33.4	43.5	55.2	89.8	127.0
Zimbabwe *	55.6	66.2	76.7	96.6	105.2
World	65.7	70.8	75.1	82.4	86.0
