= List of countries by ethnic and cultural diversity level =

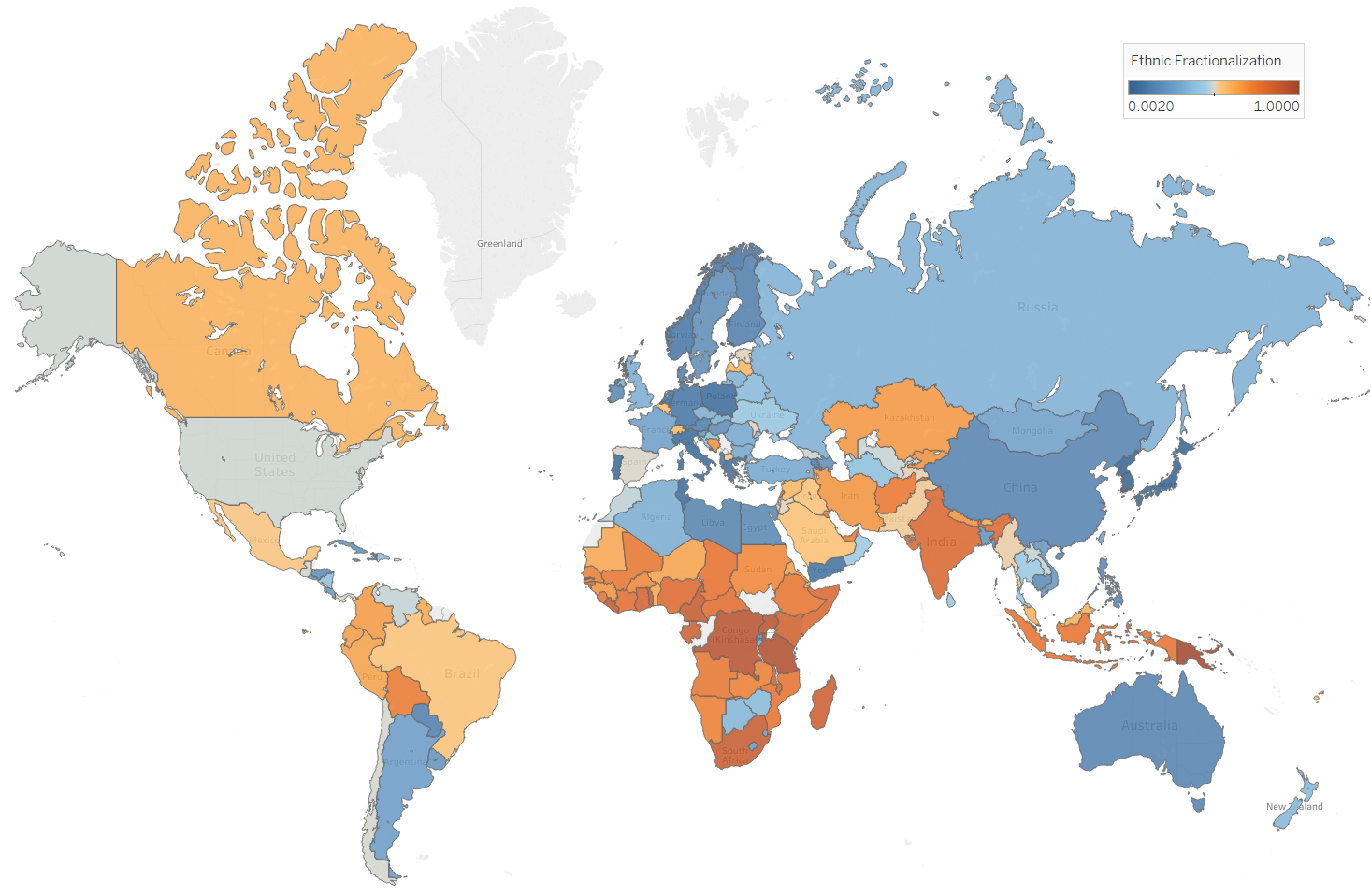
List of countries by ethnic and cultural diversity level. List based on Fearon's analysis

This is a list of countries by ethnic and cultural diversity level, as per Fearon's analysis.

== Methodology ==
The lists are commonly used in economics and cultural literature to compare the levels of ethnic, cultural, linguistic and religious fractionalization in different countries.

Fractionalization is the probability that two individuals drawn randomly from the country's groups are not from the same group (ethnic, religious, or whatever the criterion is). In Fearon's analysis, only groups containing over one percent of the country's population were considered. This limit made Papua New Guinea an outlier; as none of its thousands of groups included more than one percent of the population, it was considered to have zero groups and thus have a perfect fractionalization score of 1.

The two lists have been described by Alesina and La Ferrara as follows:

Fearon and Alesina et al. have compiled various measures of ethnic heterogeneity which try to tackle the fact that the difference amongst groups manifests itself in different ways in different places. The two classifications are constructed differently. Alesina et al. do not take a stand on what ethnicity (or language or religion) are more salient than others and adopt the country breakdown suggested by original sources, mainly the Encyclopædia Britannica. Fearon instead is trying to construct the 'right list' of ethnic groups which 'depends on what people in the country identify as the most socially relevant ethnic groupings'. This approach has the advantage of being closer to what the theory would want and the disadvantage of having to make judgement calls (or adopt others' judgement calls) about what is the 'right list'.

== List based on Fearon's analysis ==
In the Fearon list, cultural fractionalization is approximated by a measure of similarity between languages, varying from 1 = the population speaks two or more unrelated languages to 0 = the entire population speaks the same language. This index of cultural diversity is biased towards linguistic variations as opposed to genetic diversity and other variations. It should also be noted that the date of collection for data regarding ethnicity varies drastically between countries from 1981 to 2001 while data for linguistic and religious fractionalisation was collected in 2001.

Ethnic, linguistic and religious fractionalization (2003)
Country	Ethnic fractionalization	Linguistic fractionalization	Religious fractionalization
Afghanistan	0.7693	0.6141	0.2717
Albania	0.2204	0.0399	0.4719
Algeria	0.3394	0.4427	0.0091
American Samoa	0.0000	0.1733	0.6395
Andorra	0.7139	0.6848	0.2326
Angola	0.7867	0.7870	0.6276
Antigua and Barbuda	0.1643	0.1063	0.6840
Argentina	0.2550	0.0618	0.2236
Armenia	0.1272	0.1291	0.4576
Aruba	0.0000	0.3889	0.4107
Australia	0.0929	0.3349	0.8211
Austria	0.1068	0.1522	0.4146
Azerbaijan	0.2047	0.2054	0.4899
Bahamas	0.4228	0.1855	0.6815
Bahrain	0.5021	0.4344	0.5528
Bangladesh	0.0454	0.0925	0.2090
Barbados	0.1423	0.0926	0.6934
Belarus	0.3222	0.4666	0.6116
Belgium	0.5554	0.5409	0.2127
Belize	0.7015	0.6303	0.5813
Benin	0.7872	0.7905	0.5544
Bermuda	0.0000	0.0000	0.7112
Bhutan	0.6050	0.6056	0.3787
Bolivia	0.7396	0.2240	0.2085
Bosnia and Herzegovina	0.6300	0.6751	0.6851
Botswana	0.4102	0.4110	0.5986
Brazil	0.5408	0.0468	0.6054
Brunei	0.5416	0.3438	0.4404
Bulgaria	0.4021	0.3031	0.5965
Burkina Faso	0.7377	0.7228	0.5798
Burundi	0.2951	0.2977	0.5158
Cambodia	0.2105	0.2104	0.0965
Cameroon	0.8635	0.8898	0.7338
Canada	0.7124	0.5772	0.6958
Cape Verde	0.4174	0.0000	0.0766
Central African Republic	0.8295	0.8334	0.7916
Chad	0.8620	0.8635	0.6411
Chile	0.1861	0.1871	0.3841
China	0.1538	0.1327	0.6643
Colombia	0.6014	0.0193	0.1478
Comoros	0.0000	0.0103	0.0137
DR Congo	0.8747	0.8705	0.7021
Congo	0.8747	0.6871	0.6642
Costa Rica	0.2368	0.0489	0.2410
Ivory Coast	0.8204	0.7842	0.7551
Croatia	0.3690	0.0763	0.4447
Cuba	0.5908	0.0000	0.5059
Cyprus	0.0939	0.3962	0.3962
Czech Republic	0.3222	0.3233	0.6591
Denmark	0.0819	0.1049	0.2333
Djibouti	0.7962	0.6558	0.0435
Dominica	0.2003	0.0000	0.4628
Dominican Republic	0.4294	0.0395	0.3118
Timor-Leste	0.0000	0.5261	0.4254
Ecuador	0.6550	0.1308	0.1417
Egypt	0.1836	0.0237	0.1979
El Salvador	0.1978	0.0000	0.3559
Equatorial Guinea	0.3467	0.3220	0.1195
Eritrea	0.6524	0.6530	0.4253
Estonia	0.5062	0.4944	0.4985
Ethiopia	0.7235	0.8073	0.6249
Faroe Islands	0.0000	0.0000	0.3147
Fiji	0.5479	0.5479	0.5682
Finland	0.1315	0.1412	0.2531
France	0.1727	0.1811	0.6982
French Guiana	0.0000	0.1154	0.4959
French Polynesia	0.0000	0.6078	0.5813
Gabon	0.7690	0.7821	0.6674
Gambia	0.7864	0.8076	0.0970
Palestine	0.0000	0.0104	0.0342
Georgia	0.4923	0.4749	0.6543
Germany	0.1682	0.1642	0.6571
Ghana	0.6733	0.6731	0.7987
Greece	0.1576	0.0300	0.1530
Greenland	0.0000	0.2188	0.4592
Grenada	0.2661	0.0000	0.5898
Guadeloupe	0.0000	0.0933	0.3069
Guam	0.0000	0.7320	0.4082
Guatemala	0.5122	0.4586	0.3753
Guinea	0.7389	0.7725	0.2649
Guinea-Bissau	0.8082	0.8141	0.6128
Guyana	0.6195	0.0688	0.7876
Haiti	0.0950	0.0000	0.4704
Honduras	0.1867	0.0553	0.2357
Hong Kong	0.0620	0.2128	0.4191
Hungary	0.1522	0.0297	0.5244
Iceland	0.0798	0.0820	0.1913
India	0.4182	0.8069	0.3260
Indonesia	0.7351	0.7680	0.2340
Iran	0.6684	0.7462	0.1152
Iraq	0.3689	0.3694	0.4844
Ireland	0.1206	0.0312	0.1550
Isle of Man	0.0000	0.0000	0.4729
Israel	0.3436	0.5525	0.3469
Italy	0.1145	0.1147	0.3027
Jamaica	0.4129	0.1098	0.6160
Japan	0.0119	0.0178	0.5406
Jersey	0.0000	0.0000	0.5479
Jordan	0.5926	0.0396	0.0659
Kazakhstan	0.6171	0.6621	0.5898
Kenya	0.8588	0.8860	0.7765
Kiribati	0.0511	0.0237	0.5541
South Korea	0.0020	0.0021	0.6604
North Korea	0.0392	0.0028	0.4891
Kyrgyzstan	0.6752	0.5949	0.4470
Kuwait	0.6604	0.3444	0.6745
Laos	0.5139	0.6382	0.5453
Latvia	0.5867	0.5795	0.5556
Lebanon	0.1314	0.1312	0.7886
Lesotho	0.2550	0.2543	0.7211
Liberia	0.9084	0.9038	0.4883
Libya	0.7920	0.0758	0.0570
Liechtenstein	0.5726	0.2246	0.3343
Lithuania	0.3223	0.3219	0.4141
Luxembourg	0.5302	0.6440	0.0911
Macau	0.0000	0.2519	0.5511
North Macedonia	0.5023	0.5021	0.5899
Madagascar	0.8791	0.0204	0.5191
Malawi	0.6744	0.6023	0.8192
Malaysia	0.5880	0.5970	0.6657
Mali	0.6906	0.8388	0.1820
Malta	0.0414	0.0907	0.1223
Marshall Islands	0.0603	0.0734	0.5207
Martinique	0.0000	0.0000	0.2336
Mauritania	0.6150	0.3260	0.0149
Mauritius	0.4634	0.4547	0.6385
Mayotte	0.0000	0.7212	0.0620
Mexico	0.5418	0.1511	0.1796
Federated States of Micronesia	0.7005	0.7483	0.6469
Moldova	0.5535	0.5533	0.5603
Monaco	0.6838	0.7305	0.3047
Mongolia	0.3682	0.3734	0.0799
Morocco	0.4841	0.4683	0.0035
Mozambique	0.6932	0.8125	0.6759
Burma	0.5062	0.5072	0.1974
Namibia	0.6329	0.7005	0.6626
Nauru	0.5832	0.6161	0.6194
Nepal	0.6632	0.7167	0.1417
Netherlands Antilles	0.0000	0.2508	0.3866
Netherlands	0.1054	0.5143	0.7222
New Caledonia	0.0000	0.6633	0.5462
New Zealand	0.3969	0.1657	0.8110
Nicaragua	0.4844	0.0473	0.4290
Niger	0.6518	0.6519	0.2013
Nigeria	0.8505	0.8316	0.7421
Northern Mariana Islands	0.0000	0.7754	0.4811
Norway	0.0586	0.0673	0.2048
Oman	0.4373	0.3567	0.4322
Pakistan	0.7098	0.7190	0.3848
Palau	0.4312	0.3157	0.7147
Panama	0.5528	0.3873	0.3338
Papua New Guinea	0.2718	0.3526	0.5523
Paraguay	0.1689	0.5975	0.2123
Peru	0.6566	0.3358	0.1988
Philippines	0.2385	0.8360	0.3056
Poland	0.1183	0.0468	0.1712
Portugal	0.0468	0.0198	0.1438
Puerto Rico	0.0000	0.0352	0.4952
Qatar	0.7456	0.4800	0.0950
Réunion	0.0000	0.1578	0.1952
Romania	0.3069	0.1723	0.2373
Russia	0.2452	0.2485	0.4398
Rwanda	0.3238	0.0000	0.5066
Saint Lucia	0.1769	0.3169	0.3320
Saint Vincent and the Grenadines	0.3066	0.0175	0.7028
Western Samoa	0.1376	0.0111	0.7871
San Marino	0.2927	0.0000	0.1975
São Tomé and Príncipe	0.0000	0.2322	0.1866
Saudi Arabia	0.1800	0.0949	0.1270
Senegal	0.6939	0.7081	0.1497
Serbia	0.5736	-	-
Seychelles	0.2025	0.1606	0.2323
Sierra Leone	0.8191	0.7634	0.5395
Singapore	0.3857	0.3835	0.6561
Slovakia	0.2539	0.2551	0.5655
Slovenia	0.2216	0.2201	0.2868
Solomon Islands	0.1110	0.5254	0.6708
Somalia	0.8117	0.0326	0.0028
South Africa	0.7517	0.8652	0.8603
Spain	0.4165	0.4132	0.4514
Sri Lanka	0.4150	0.4645	0.4853
Saint Kitts and Nevis	0.1842	-	0.6614
Sudan	0.7147	0.7190	0.4307
Suriname	0.7332	0.3310	0.7910
Eswatini	0.0582	0.1722	0.4444
Sweden	0.0600	0.1968	0.2342
Switzerland	0.5314	0.5441	0.6083
Syria	0.5399	0.1817	0.4310
Taiwan	0.2744	0.5028	0.6845
Tajikistan	0.5107	0.5473	0.3386
Tanzania	0.7353	0.8983	0.6334
Thailand	0.6338	0.6344	0.0994
Togo	0.7099	0.8980	0.6596
Tonga	0.0869	0.3782	0.6214
Trinidad and Tobago	0.6475	0.1251	0.7936
Tunisia	0.0394	0.0124	0.0104
Turkey	0.3200	0.2216	0.0049
Turkmenistan	0.3918	0.3984	0.2327
Tuvalu	0.1629	0.1372	0.2524
Uganda	0.9302	0.9227	0.6332
Ukraine	0.4737	0.4741	0.6157
United Arab Emirates	0.6252	0.4874	0.3310
United Kingdom	0.1211	0.0532	0.6944
United States	0.4901	0.5647	0.8241
Uruguay	0.2504	0.0817	0.3548
Uzbekistan	0.4125	0.4120	0.2133
Vanuatu	0.0413	0.5794	0.7044
Venezuela	0.4966	0.0686	0.1350
Vietnam	0.2383	0.2377	0.5080
U.S. Virgin Islands	0.0000	0.3140	0.6359
West Bank	0.0000	0.1438	0.3095
Yemen	0.0000	0.0080	0.0023
Yugoslavia	0.8092	0.6064	0.5530
Zambia	0.7808	0.8734	0.7359
Zimbabwe	0.3874	0.4472	0.7363
