= List of island countries by population density =

This is a list of island countries by population density.

Unless otherwise noted, areas and populations are sourced from the United Nations World Population Prospects, which uses the latest censuses and official figures, as well as figures from the United Nations Department of Economic and Social Affairs. Data are current as of 2023. (Note: See the Data Portal at the World Population Prospects site. The area figures are listed in the Demographic Yearbook 2022.)

== Island countries by population density ==
- Links for each location go to the relevant demography page, when available.
- Dependancies are shown with their controlling states in parentheses.

List of island countries and dependencies by population density
Location	Density /km^{2}	Density /mi^{2}	Population	Area km^{2}	Area mi^{2}	
Macau (China)	21,000	54,000	704,150	33	13	
Singapore	8,250	21,400	6,014,723	729	281	
Bahrain	1,910	4,900	1,485,510	778	300	
Maldives	1,750	4,500	523,787	300	120	
Malta	1,700	4,400	535,065	315	122	
Sint Maarten (NL)	1,300	3,400	44,222	34	13	
Bermuda (UK)	1,200	3,100	64,069	54	21	
Guernsey (UK)	990	2,600	63,544	64	25	
Jersey (UK)	964	2,500	111,803	116	45	
Mayotte (France)	913	2,360	335,995	368	142	
Taiwan	676	1,750	23,923,277	35,410	13,670	
Mauritius	657	1,700	1,300,557	1,979	764	
Barbados	654	1,690	281,996	431	166	
Nauru	610	1,600	12,780	21	8.1	
Saint Martin (France)	610	1,600	32,077	53	20	
Aruba (NL)	590	1,500	106,277	180	69	
Saint Barthélemy (France)	500	1,300	10,994	22	8.5	
Tuvalu	440	1,100	11,396	26	10	
Curaçao (NL)	433	1,120	192,077	444	171	
Haiti	423	1,100	11,724,764	27,750	10,710	
Réunion (France)	391	1,010	981,796	2,510	970	
Philippines	391	1,010	117,337,368	300,000	120,000	
Comoros	381	990	852,075	2,235	863	
Puerto Rico (US)	368	950	3,260,314	8,868	3,424	
Grenada	366	950	126,184	345	133	
Martinique (France)	337	870	366,981	1,090	420	
Sri Lanka	334	870	21,893,579	65,610	25,330	
Japan	326	840	123,294,513	377,930	145,920	
Guam (US)	320	830	172,952	541	209	
Trinidad and Tobago	299	770	1,534,937	5,127	1,980	
Saint Lucia	293	760	180,251	616	238	
U.S. Virgin Islands (US)	285	740	98,750	347	134	
United Kingdom	277	720	67,736,802	244,376	94,354	
Saint Vincent and the Grenadines	267	690	103,699	389	150	
Cayman Islands (UK)	263	680	69,310	264	102	
Jamaica	257	670	2,825,544	10,991	4,244	
Guadeloupe (France)	242	630	395,839	1,639	633	
São Tomé and Príncipe	241	620	231,856	964	372	
Seychelles	236	610	107,660	457	176	
Dominican Republic	233	600	11,332,973	48,671	18,792	
Marshall Islands	232	600	41,996	181	70	
American Samoa (US)	221	570	43,915	199	77	
Antigua and Barbuda	213	550	94,298	442	171	
British Virgin Islands (UK)	209	540	31,538	151	58	
Kiribati	184	480	133,515	726	280	
Saint Kitts and Nevis	183	470	47,755	261	101	
Anguilla (UK)	175	450	15,900	91	35	
Micronesia	164	420	115,224	702	271	
Tokelau (NZ)	158	410	1,893	12	4.6	
Cape Verde	148	380	598,682	4,033	1,557	
Isle of Man (UK)	148	380	84,710	572	221	
Tonga	144	370	107,773	747	288	
Cyprus	136	350	1,260,138	9,251	3,572	
Northern Cyprus	114	300	382,836	3,355	1,295	(Note: Data are from the TRNC State Planning Organization.)
Northern Mariana Islands (US)	109	280	49,796	457	176	
Cuba	102	260	11,194,449	109,884	42,426	
Dominica	97	250	73,040	750	290	
Timor-Leste	91	240	1,360,596	14,919	5,760	
French Polynesia (France)	84	220	308,872	3,687	1,424	
Caribbean Netherlands (NL)	83	210	27,148	328	127	
Wallis and Futuna (France)	81	210	11,502	142	55	
Samoa	79	200	225,681	2,842	1,097	
Brunei	78	200	452,524	5,765	2,226	
Ireland	72	190	5,056,935	69,825	26,960	
Cook Islands	72	190	17,044	236	91	
Akrotiri and Dhekelia (UK)	62	160	15,700	254	98	
Norfolk Island (Australia)	57	150	2,220	39	15	
Madagascar	52	130	30,325,732	587,041	226,658	
Fiji	51	130	936,376	18,272	7,055	
Turks and Caicos Islands (UK)	49	130	46,062	948	366	
Saint Helena, Ascension and Tristan da Cunha (UK)	43	110	5,314	123	47	
Cocos (Keeling) Islands (Australia)	43	110	602	14	5.4	
Montserrat (UK)	43	110	4,387	103	40	
Palau	39	100	18,058	459	177	
Faroe Islands (Denmark)	38	98	53,270	1,393	538	
Bahamas	30	78	412,624	13,940	5,380	
Vanuatu	27	70	334,506	12,189	4,706	
Solomon Islands	26	67	740,425	28,896	11,157	
Saint Pierre and Miquelon (France)	24	62	5,840	242	93	
Papua New Guinea	22	57	10,329,931	462,840	178,700	
New Zealand	20	52	5,228,100	268,107	103,517	
Åland (Finland)	19	49	30,237	1,583	611	
New Caledonia (France)	15	39	292,991	19,100	7,400	
Christmas Island (Australia)	12	31	1,692	136	53	
Niue	7	18	1,935	260	100	
Iceland	4	10	375,319	103,000	40,000	
Pitcairn Islands (UK)	0.9	2.3	40	47	18	(Note: Pitcairn's tourist site gives an undated figure of exactly 40 as of 2023, while its official government site states the number is "around fifty".)
Falkland Islands (UK)	0.3	0.78	3,791	12,173	4,700	
Greenland (Denmark)	0.03	0.078	56,643	2,166,086	836,330	

== See also ==
- List of archipelagos
- List of archipelagos by number of islands
- List of artificial islands
- List of divided islands
- List of islands
- List of islands by area
- List of islands by population
- List of islands by population density
- List of island countries
