= Demographics of Lesotho =

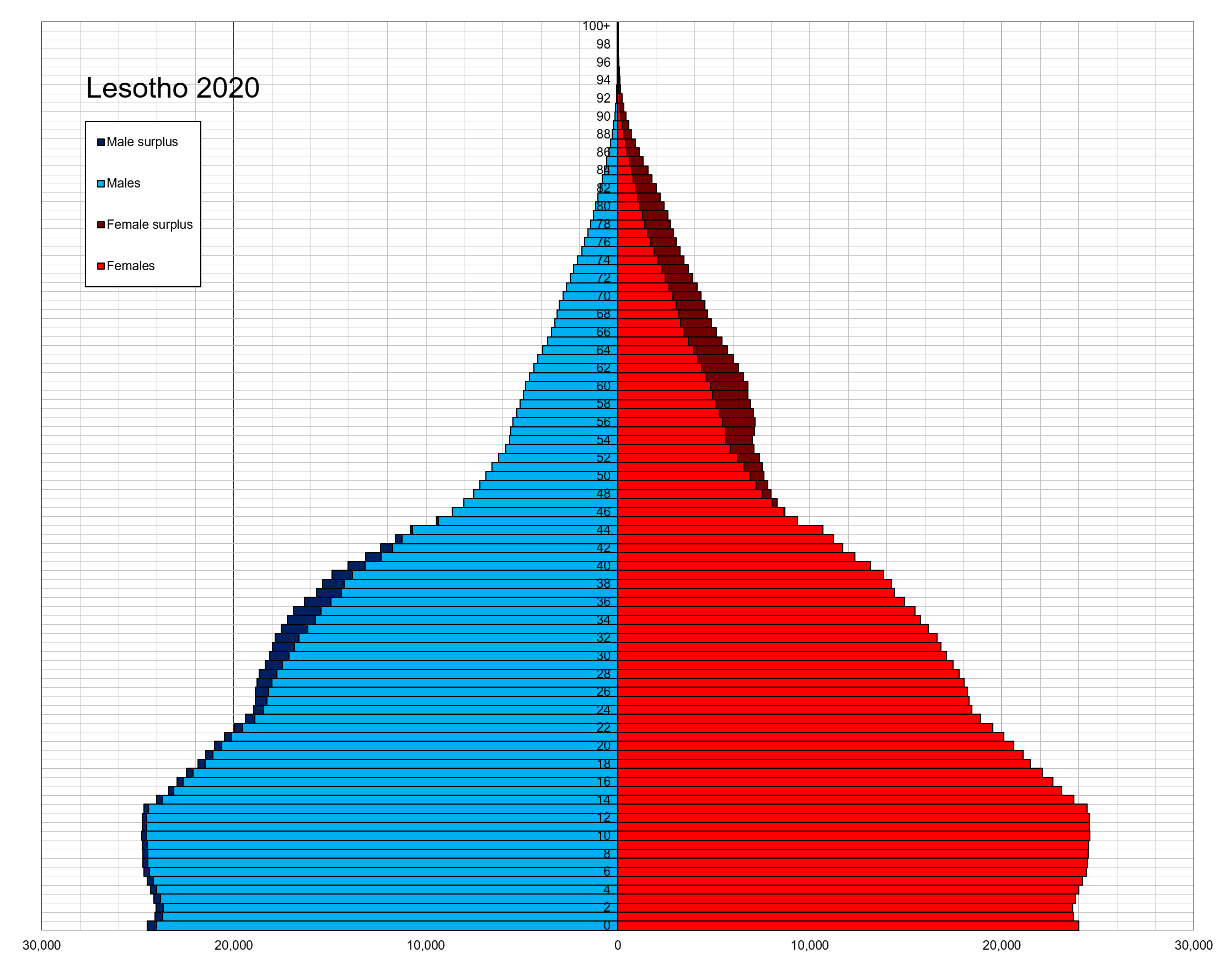
- Population pyramid of Lesotho in 2020
- Population: 2,193,970 (2022 est.)
- Growth rate: 0.76% (2022 est.)
- Birth rate: 23.15 births/1,000 population (2022 est.)
- Death rate: 11.05 deaths/1,000 population (2022 est.)
- Life expectancy: 59.57 years
  - male: 57.57 years
  - female: 61.64 years
- Fertility rate: 2.92 children born/woman (2022 est.)
- Infant mortality: 48.44 deaths/1,000 live births
- Net migration rate: -4.55 migrant(s)/1,000 population (2022 est.)

Age structure
- 0–14 years: 31.3%
- 65 and over: 5.6%

Sex ratio
- Total: 0.98 male(s)/female (2022 est.)
- At birth: 1.03 male(s)/female
- Under 15: 1.01 male(s)/female
- 65 and over: 0.48 male(s)/female

Nationality
- Nationality: Basotho
- Major ethnic: Sotho (99.7%)

Language
- Official: Sesotho, English

Demographic features of the population of Lesotho include population density, ethnicity, education level, health of the populace, economic status, religious affiliations and other aspects.

The Demographics of Lesotho describe the condition and overview of Lesotho's people, residents of which are called Basotho in the plural and Mosotho in the singular. Demographic topics include basic education, health, and population statistics as well as identified racial and religious affiliations.

== Population ==
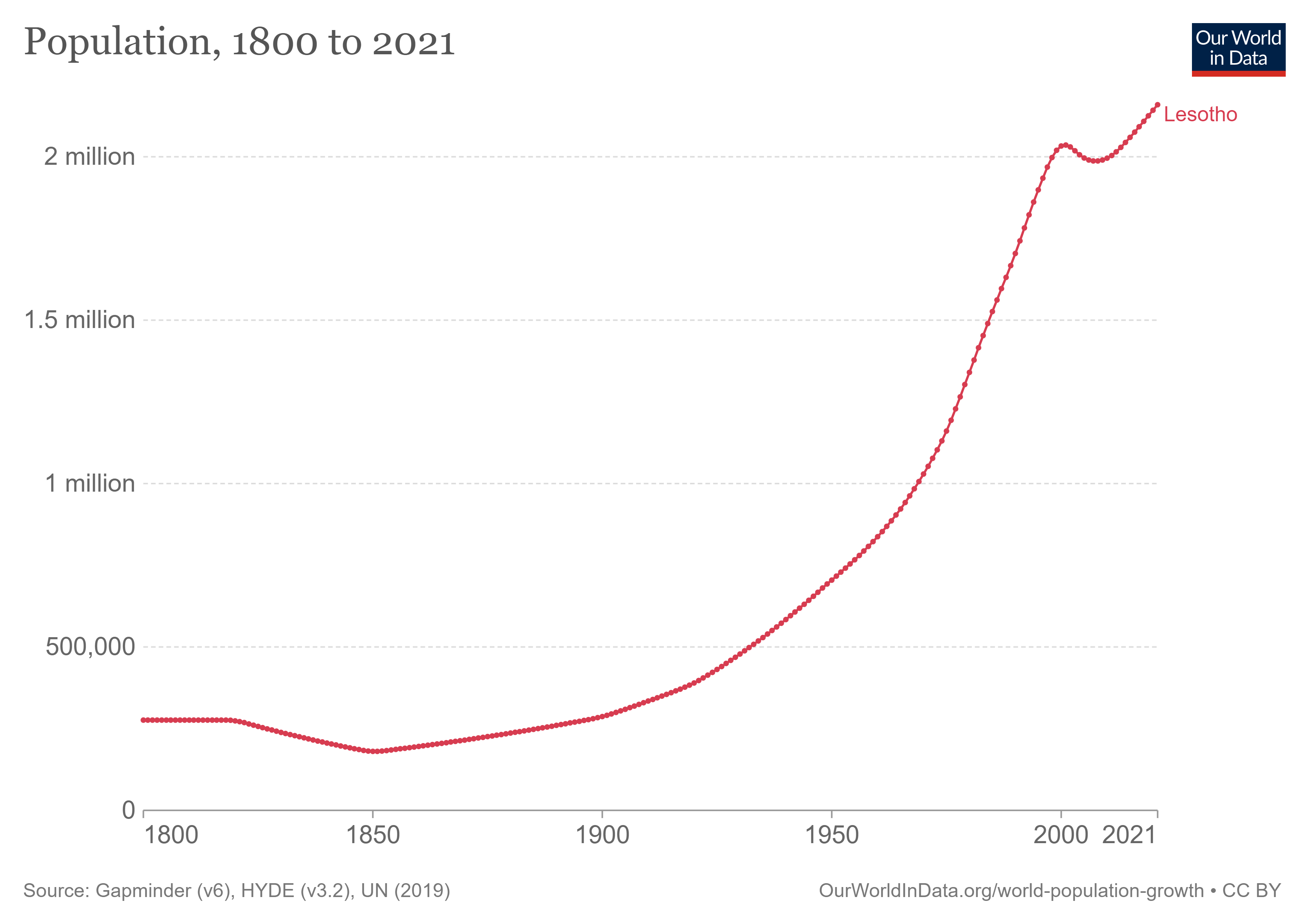
Historical population of Lesotho (Our World in Data).

According to the 2016 census, Lesotho has a total population of 2,007,201. Of the population, 34.17 percent lived in urban and 65.83 percent in rural areas. The country's capital, Maseru, accounts for around half of the total urban population. The sex distribution is 982,133 male and 1,025,068 female, or around 96 males for each 100 females. Population in 2023 is 2,311,472, according to WHO.

The average population density in the country is around 66,1 people per square kilometer. The density is lower in the Lesotho Highlands than in the western lowlands. Although the majority of the population—56.1 percent—is between 15 and 64 years of age, Lesotho has a substantial youth population numbering around 37.8 percent. The annual population growth rate is estimated at 0.13%

According to the 2022 revision of the World Population Prospects the total population was 2,281,454 in 2021, compared to only 734 000 in 1950. The proportion of children below the age of 15 in 2010 was 37.4%, 58.3% was between 15 and 65 years of age, while 4.3% was 65 years or older.

	Total population	Population aged 0–14 (%)	Population aged 15–64 (%)	Population aged 65+ (%)
1950	734 000	40.7	54.9	4.5
1955	788 000	41.9	53.7	4.4
1960	852 000	43.1	52.7	4.3
1965	934 000	43.6	52.2	4.2
1970	1 033 000	44.1	51.8	4.2
1975	1 150 000	44.5	51.3	4.2
1980	1 310 000	44.3	51.6	4.1
1985	1 487 000	44.3	51.6	4.1
1990	1 639 000	44.1	51.7	4.2
1995	1 795 000	43.1	52.5	4.4
2000	1 964 000	41.2	54.3	4.5
2005	2 066 000	39.6	56.0	4.4
2010	2 171 000	37.4	58.3	4.3

Population by Sex and Age Group (Census 10.IV.2016):

Age group	Male	Female	Total	%
Total	982 133	1 025 068	2 007 201	100
0–4	100 793	99 362	200 155	9.97
5–9	109 953	111 523	221 476	11.03
10–14	107 879	107 934	215 813	10.75
15–19	106 214	103 652	209 866	10.46
20–24	98 827	100 440	199 267	9.93
25–29	95 802	93 141	188 943	9.41
30–34	86 956	81 189	168 145	8.38
35–39	68 246	62 135	130 381	6.50
40–44	48 665	47 630	96 295	4.80
45–49	36 425	38 462	74 887	3.73
50–54	31 785	38 574	70 359	3.51
55–59	25 759	34 058	59 817	2.98
60–64	20 770	28 451	49 221	2.45
65-69	15 311	22 047	37 358	1.86
70-74	12 017	18 791	30 808	1.53
75-79	8 467	15 707	24 174	1.20
80-84	5 424	13 197	18 621	0.93
85-89	1 873	5 201	7 074	0.35
90-94	662	2 127	2 789	0.14
95+	305	1 447	1 752	0.09
Age group	Male	Female	Total	Percent
0–14	318 625	318 819	637 444	31.76
15–64	619 449	627 732	1 247 181	62.14
65+	44 059	78 517	122 576	6.11

Population Estimates by Sex and Age Group (01.VII.2021) (Data are projections based on the 2016 Population Census.):

Age group	Male	Female	Total	%
Total	1 019 453	1 057 858	2 077 311	100
0–4	100 104	98 343	198 446	9.55
5–9	111 585	114 805	226 390	10.90
10–14	106 278	106 664	212 942	10.25
15–19	100 311	96 522	196 832	9.48
20–24	95 959	96 699	192 658	9.27
25–29	102 411	98 595	201 006	9.68
30–34	101 352	92 981	194 333	9.36
35–39	80 459	69 851	150 310	7.24
40–44	53 415	49 648	103 063	4.96
45–49	37 537	38 314	75 852	3.65
50–54	33 352	40 804	74 155	3.57
55–59	27 071	37 915	64 986	3.13
60–64	22 945	32 509	55 454	2.67
65-69	16 336	23 852	40 187	1.93
70+	30 340	60 356	90 696	4.37
Age group	Male	Female	Total	Percent
0–14	317 967	319 812	637 779	30.70
15–64	654 810	653 838	1 308 648	63.00
65+	46 676	84 208	130 884	6.30

== Vital statistics ==
Population, fertility rate and net reproduction rate, United Nations estimates

Registration of vital events is in Lesotho not complete. The Population Departement of the United Nations prepared the following estimates.

Period	Live births per year	Deaths per year	Natural change per year	CBR*	CDR*	NC*	TFR*	IMR*
1950–1955	32 000	17 000	15 000	42.1	22.7	19.4	5.84	169
1955–1960	35 000	17 000	18 000	42.2	20.3	21.9	5.86	150
1960–1965	38 000	16 000	21 000	42.3	18.3	24.0	5.81	134
1965–1970	42 000	17 000	24 000	42.5	17.8	24.8	5.80	130
1970–1975	47 000	18 000	28 000	42.8	16.9	26.0	5.80	123
1975–1980	52 000	19 000	33 000	42.0	15.1	27.0	5.69	110
1980–1985	56 000	18 000	38 000	40.4	13.0	27.4	5.46	94
1985–1990	59 000	18 000	41 000	37.6	11.6	26.0	5.14	84
1990–1995	60 000	17 000	42 000	34.7	10.0	24.7	4.70	70
1995–2000	63 000	25 000	38 000	33.7	13.5	20.2	4.37	81
2000–2005	62 000	36 000	26 000	30.7	17.9	12.8	3.79	86
2005–2010	60 000	35 000	25 000	28.5	16.7	11.9	3.37	77
* CBR = crude birth rate (per 1000); CDR = crude death rate (per 1000); NC = natural change (per 1000); IMR = infant mortality rate per 1000 births; TFR = total fertility rate (number of children per woman)

=== Demographic and Health Surveys ===
Total Fertility Rate (TFR) (Wanted Fertility Rate) and Crude Birth Rate (CBR):

Year	Total			Urban			Rural		
Year	CBR	TFR	WFR	CBR	TFR	WFR	CBR	TFR	WFR
2004	25.3	3.5	2.5	19.3	1.9	1.4	26.7	4.1	2.9
2009	26.4	3.3	2.4	24.5	2.1	1.7	27.1	4.0	2.8
2014	24.3	3.3	2.3	23.3	2.3	1.7	24.7	3.9	2.7
2023-24	18.6	2.5	1.9	19.0	2.1	1.6	18.4	2.8	2.1

Fertility data as of 2014 (DHS Program):
District	Total fertility rate	Percentage of women age 15-49 currently pregnant	Mean number of children ever born to women age 40-49
Butha-Buthe	3.7	4.7	3.9
Leribe	3.5	3.6	3.7
Berea	3.1	3.5	3.7
Maseru	2.6	4.4	3.5
Mafeteng	2.8	6.1	3.5
Mohale's Hoek	3.8	3.8	3.7
Quthing	3.9	3.3	4.1
Qacha's Nek	2.9	5.0	3.8
Mokhotlong	4.4	5.2	4.9
Thaba-Tseka	4.0	4.3	4.6

=== Life expectancy at birth ===
Life expectancy from 1950 to 2015 (UN World Population Prospects):

Period	Life expectancy in Years
1950–1955	42.15
1955–1960	▲45.08
1960–1965	▲47.80
1965–1970	▲48.52
1970–1975	▲49.80
1975–1980	▲52.24
1980–1985	▲55.28
1985–1990	▲57.33
1990–1995	▲59.70
1995–2000	▼52.74
2000–2005	▼45.62
2005–2010	▲49.04
2010–2015	▲52.51

== Ethnic groups and languages ==
Ethnic groups in Lesotho
Ethnic groups
Sotho	99.7%
Europeans, South Asians and Other	0.3%

Due to Lesotho's long history as a unified nation, that continued even through British colonial rule, the ethnic makeup of the country is very homogenous. Lesotho's ethno-linguistic structure consists almost entirely of the Basotho (singular Mosotho), a Bantu-speaking people: an estimate of 99.7 percent of the people identify as Basotho. The Kwena (Bakoena) are the largest subgroup of the Sotho; other Basotho subgroups include the Natal (North) Nguni, Batloung (the Tlou), Baphuthi (the Phuti), Bafokeng, Bataung (the Tau), Bats'oeneng (the tso'ene) and the Cape (South) Nguni (Thembu). Other ethnic groups in Lesotho include South Asians (Indian, Pakistani), numbering more than 4,000 and a few hundred Europeans.

Sesotho (Southern Sotho) and English languages are both official. Afrikaans, Zulu, Xhosa and French are also spoken.

== Religion ==
Religion in Lesotho (ARDA 2020 est.)
1. Catholic (54.9%)
2. Protestant (35.4%)
3. Other Christian (1.91%)
4. Ethnic Religion (6.61%)
5. Baháʼí (0.99%)
6. None (0.26%)
7. Other (0.10%)

The population of Lesotho is estimated to be around 90 percent Christian. Roman Catholics, the largest religious group, make up around 45 percent of the population. Evangelicals comprise 26 percent of the population, and Anglican and other Christian groups an additional 19 percent. Muslims, Hindus, Buddhists, Baháʼí, and members of traditional indigenous religions comprise the remaining 10 percent of the population.
