= Demographics of New Caledonia =

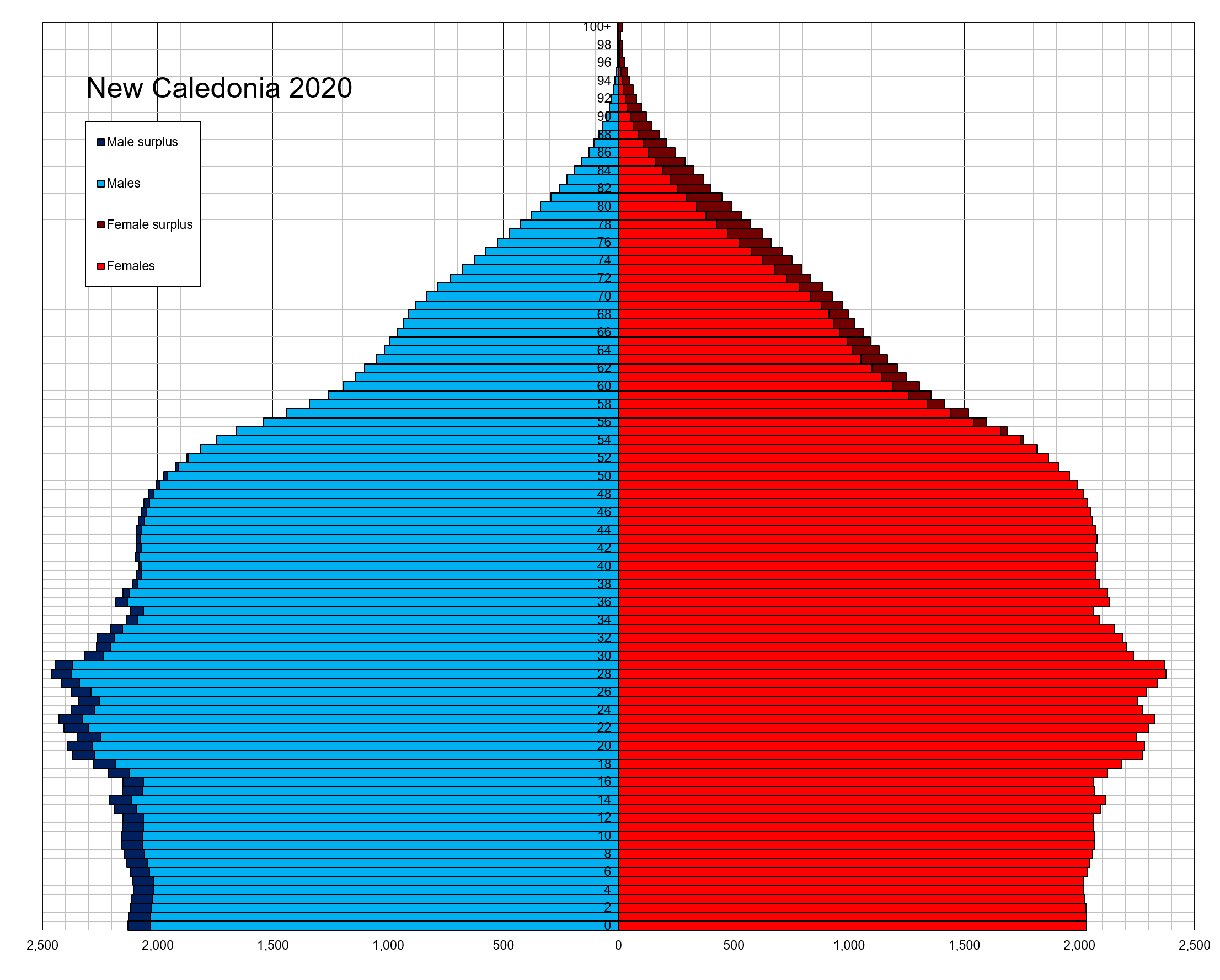
New Caledonia population pyramid in 2020

Demographic features of the population of New Caledonia include population density, ethnicity, education level, health of the populace, economic status, religious affiliations and other aspects of the population.

== Population ==
Census population

Year	Pop.	±% p.a.
1956	68,480	—
1963	86,519	+3.40%
1969	100,579	+2.54%
1976	133,233	+4.10%

Year	Pop.	±% p.a.
1983	145,368	+1.25%
1989	164,173	+2.05%
1996	196,836	+2.63%
2004	230,789	+2.01%

Year	Pop.	±% p.a.
2009	245,580	+1.25%
2014	268,767	+1.82%
2019	271,407	+0.20%
2025	264,596	−0.42%

ISEE

=== Structure of the population ===
Population Estimates by Sex and Age Group (01.I.2017):

Age group	Male	Female	Total	%
Total	140 000	138 495	278 495	100
0–4	10 481	10 106	20 587	7.39
5–9	11 009	10 286	21 295	7.65
10–14	10 922	10 583	21 505	7.72
15–19	11 621	11 342	22 963	8.25
20–24	10 329	9 608	19 937	7.16
25–29	10 338	10 400	20 738	7.45
30–34	10 760	10 727	21 487	7.72
35–39	10 255	10 462	20 717	7.44
40–44	10 853	10 702	21 555	7.74
45–49	9 795	9 949	19 744	7.09
50–54	8 939	8 780	17 719	6.36
55–59	7 010	6 945	13 955	5.01
60–64	5 722	5 508	11 230	4.03
65-69	4 516	4 361	8 877	3.19
70-74	3 339	3 311	6 650	2.39
75-79	2 157	2 485	4 642	1.67
80-84	1 198	1 595	2 793	1.00
85-89	607	931	1 538	0.55
90-94	119	317	436	0.16
95+	30	97	127	0.05
Age group	Male	Female	Total	Percent
0–14	32 412	30 975	63 387	22.76
15–64	95 622	94 423	190 045	68.24
65+	11 966	13 097	25 063	9.00

== Vital statistics ==
Births and deaths

Year	Population	Live births	Deaths	Natural increase	Crude birth rate	Crude death rate	Rate of natural increase	TFR
1981	140,050	3,668	914	2,754	27.7	6.4	21.3	3.64
1982	145,700	3,830	914	2,916	26.3	6.3	20.0	3.41
1983	148,700	3,832	848	2,984	25.8	5.7	20.1	3.33
1984	151,650	3,763	905	2,858	24.8	6.0	18.8	3.17
1985	154,450	3,619	891	2,728	23.4	5.8	17.7	3.00
1986	157,350	3,921	904	3,017	24.9	5.7	19.2	3.17
1987	160,500	4,122	913	3,209	25.7	5.7	20.0	3.25
1988	163,650	4,035	962	3,073	24.7	5.9	18.8	3.10
1989	166,898	3,944	990	2,954	23.6	5.9	17.7	2.97
1990	170,899	4,378	928	3,450	25.6	5.4	20.2	3.19
1991	175,362	4,501	978	3,523	25.7	5.6	20.1	3.15
1992	179,799	4,405	931	3,474	24.5	5.2	19.3	2.99
1993	184,496	4,337	954	3,383	23.5	5.2	18.3	2.86
1994	189,482	4,267	1,060	3,207	22.5	5.6	16.9	2.70
1995	193,816	4,242	1,020	3,222	21.9	5.3	16.6	2.59
1996	197,564	4,401	1,020	3,381	22.3	5.2	17.1	2.65
1997	201,418	4,490	1,016	3,474	22.3	5.0	17.2	2.67
1998	205,279	4,352	982	3,370	21.2	4.8	16.4	2.55
1999	209,214	4,316	1,095	3,221	20.6	5.2	15.4	2.48
2000	213,230	4,566	1,077	3,489	21.4	5.1	16.4	2.59
2001	217,324	4,326	1,131	3,195	19.9	5.2	14.7	2.43
2002	221,490	4,194	1,121	3,073	18.9	5.1	13.9	2.33
2003	225,296	4,102	1,121	2,981	18.2	5.0	13.2	2.27
2004	228,750	3,978	1,116	2,862	17.4	4.9	12.5	
2005	232,250	4,051	1,142	2,909	17.4	4.9	12.5	
2006	235,750	4,224	1,113	3,111	17.9	4.7	13.2	
2007	239,250	4,093	1,207	2,886	17.1	5.0	12.1	
2008	242,750	4,015	1,169	2,846	16.5	4.8	11.7	
2009	245,950	4,103	1,261	2,842	16.7	5.1	11.6	
2010	249,750	4,178	1,191	2,987	16.7	4.8	12.0	2.20
2011	254,350	4,119	1,320	2,799	16.2	5.2	11.0	2.15
2012	259,000	4,389	1,322	3,067	16.9	5.1	11.8	2.28
2013	263,650	4,373	1,374	2,999	16.6	5.2	11.4	2.19
2014	268,050	4,370	1,406	2,964	16.3	5.2	11.1	2.17
2015	269,460	4,191	1,465	2,726	15.6	5.4	10.2	2.08
2016	270,220	4,271	1,569	2,702	15.8	5.8	10.0	2.13
2017	270,810	4,067	1,531	2,536	15.0	5.7	9.3	2.04
2018	271,240	4,076	1,556	2,520	15.0	5.7	9.3	2.06
2019	271,228	4,110	1,627	2,483	15.2	6.0	9.2	2.10
2020	271,080	3,991	1,540	2,451	14.6	5.7	8.9	2.05
2021	270,390	3,931	1,983	1,948	14.3	7.3	7.0	2.05
2022	269,215	3,805	1,902	1,903	14.1	7.1	7.0	2.02
2023		3,688	1,864	1,824				
2024		3,552	1,799	1,753				
2025		3,237	1,833	1,404				

ISEE - Démographie

== Ethnic groups ==
Ethnic Melanesians known as Kanak constituted 41.2% of the population in 2019, followed by Europeans (Caldoche and Zoreille) with 24.1%. The Europeans are the largest ethnic group in the South Province, where they make up a plurality, while Kanak are the majority in the two other provinces. The remainder of the population are Wallis and Futunan (8.3%), Tahitian (2.0%), Indonesians (1.4%), Ni-Vanuatu (0.9%), Vietnamese, other Asian (0.4%), Mixed (11.3%), and belong to other ethnic groups (9.5%). An estimated 15,000 Caledonians were of Algerian descent.

Population of New Caledonia according to ethnic group 1963-2019
Ethnic group	census 1963		census 1969		census 1976		census 1983		census 1989		census 1996		census 2009		census 2014		census 2019	
Ethnic group	Number	%	Number	%	Number	%	Number	%	Number	%	Number	%	Number	%	Number	%	Number	%
Kanak	41,190	47.6	46,200	45.9	55,598	41.7	61,870	42.6	73,598	44.8	86,788	44.1	99,078	40.3	104,958	39.1	111,856	41.2
Europeans	33,355	38.6	41,268	41.0	50,757	38.1	53,974	37.1	55,085	33.6	67,151	34.1	71,721	29.2	73,199	27.2	65,488	24.1
Wallisians and Futunians	11,974	13.8	13,111	13.0	9,571	7.2	12,174	8.4	14,186	8.6	17,763	9.0	21,262	8.7	21,926	8.2	22,520	8.3
Tahitians	11,974	13.8	13,111	13.0	6,391	4.8	5,570	3.8	4,750	2.9	5,871	2.6	4,985	2.0	5,608	2.1	5,366	2.0
Ni-Vanuatu	11,974	13.8	13,111	13.0	1,050	0.8	1,212	0.8	1,683	1.0	2,244	1.1	2,327	0.9	2,568	1.0	2,313	0.9
Indonesians	11,974	13.8	13,111	13.0	5,111	3.8	5,319	3.7	5,191	3.2	5,003	2.5	3,767	1.6	3,859	1.4	3,786	1.4
Vietnamese	11,974	13.8	13,111	13.0	1,943	1.5	2,381	1.6	2,461	1.5	2,822	1.4	2,357	1.0	2,506	0.9	2,230	0.8
Others	11,974	13.8	13,111	13.0	2,812	2.1	2,868	2.0	7,219	4.4	9,894	5.0	39,865	16.2	54,143	20.1	57,848	21.3
Total	86,519		100,579		133,233		145,368		164,173		196,836		245,580		268,767		271,407	

== Languages ==
- French (official)
- 33 Melanesian-Polynesian dialects

== Religion ==
Religion in New Caledonia according to the Global Religious Landscape survey by the Pew Forum, 2012
1. Christianity (85.2%)
2. No religion (10.4%)
3. Islam (2.80%)
4. Buddhism (0.60%)
5. Folk religion (0.20%)
6. Others (0.80%)

== See also ==
- New Caledonia
- Europeans in Oceania
- Demographics of France
