= Demographics of Luxembourg =

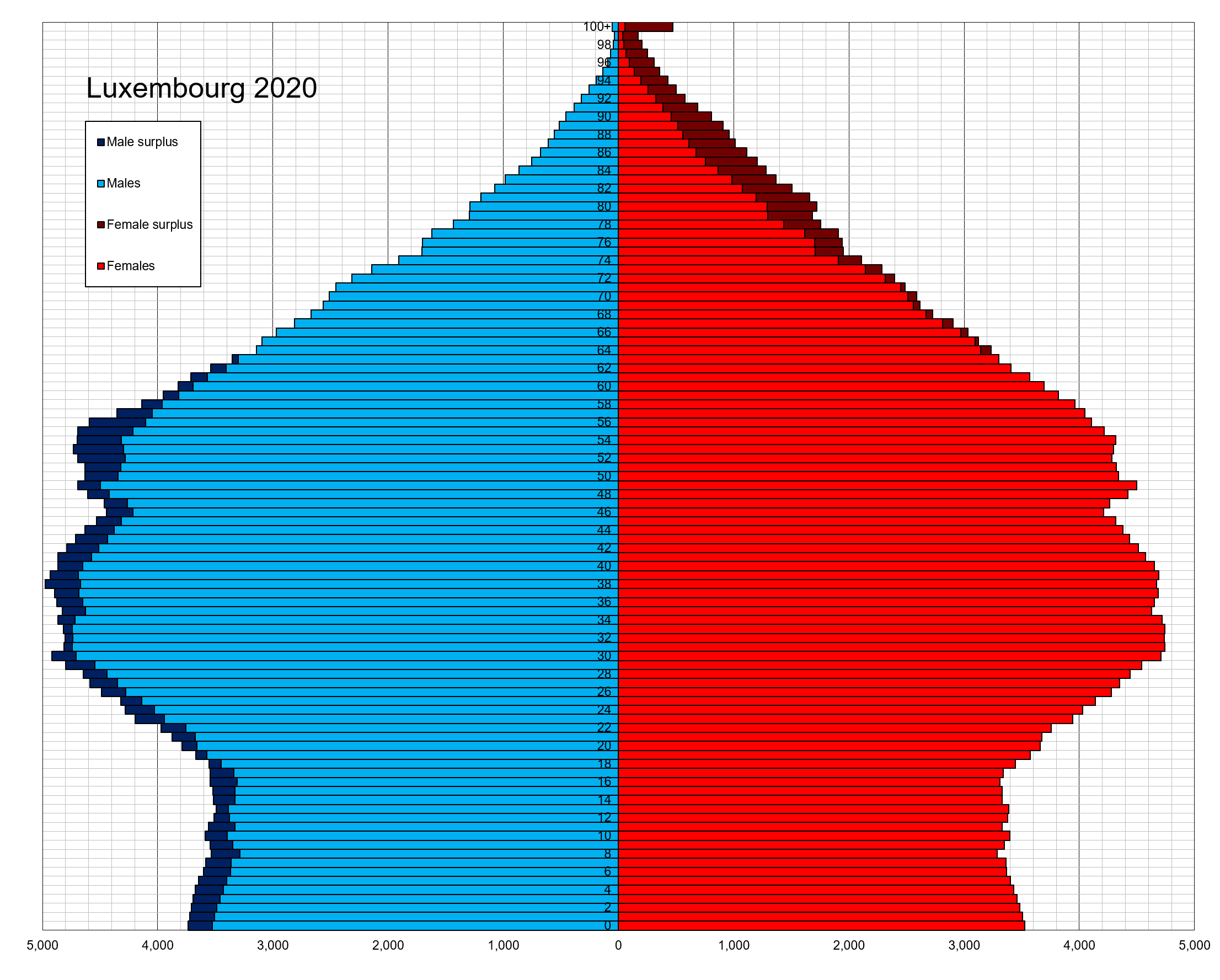
- Population pyramid of Luxembourg in 2020
- Population: 690,959 (2026 est.)
- Growth rate: 1.64% (2022 est.)
- Birth rate: 11.61 births/1,000 population (2022 est.)
- Death rate: 7.21 deaths/1,000 population (2022 est.)
- Life expectancy: 82.98 years
  - male: 80.52 years
  - female: 85.58 years (2022 est.)
- Fertility rate: 1.63 children born/woman (2022 est.)
- Infant mortality: 3.25 deaths/1,000 live births
- Net migration rate: 12.01 migrant(s)/1,000 population (2022 est.)
- Immigrant share: 51.2% (2024)

Age structure
- 0–14 years: 16.73%
- 65 and over: 15.37%

Sex ratio
- Total: 1.02 male(s)/female (2022 est.)
- At birth: 1.06 male(s)/female
- Under 15: 1.06 male(s)/female
- 65 and over: 0.7 male(s)/female

Nationality
- Nationality: Luxembourger
- Major ethnic: Luxembourger (53.4%)

Language
- Official: Luxembourgish, French, German
- Spoken: Luxembourgish

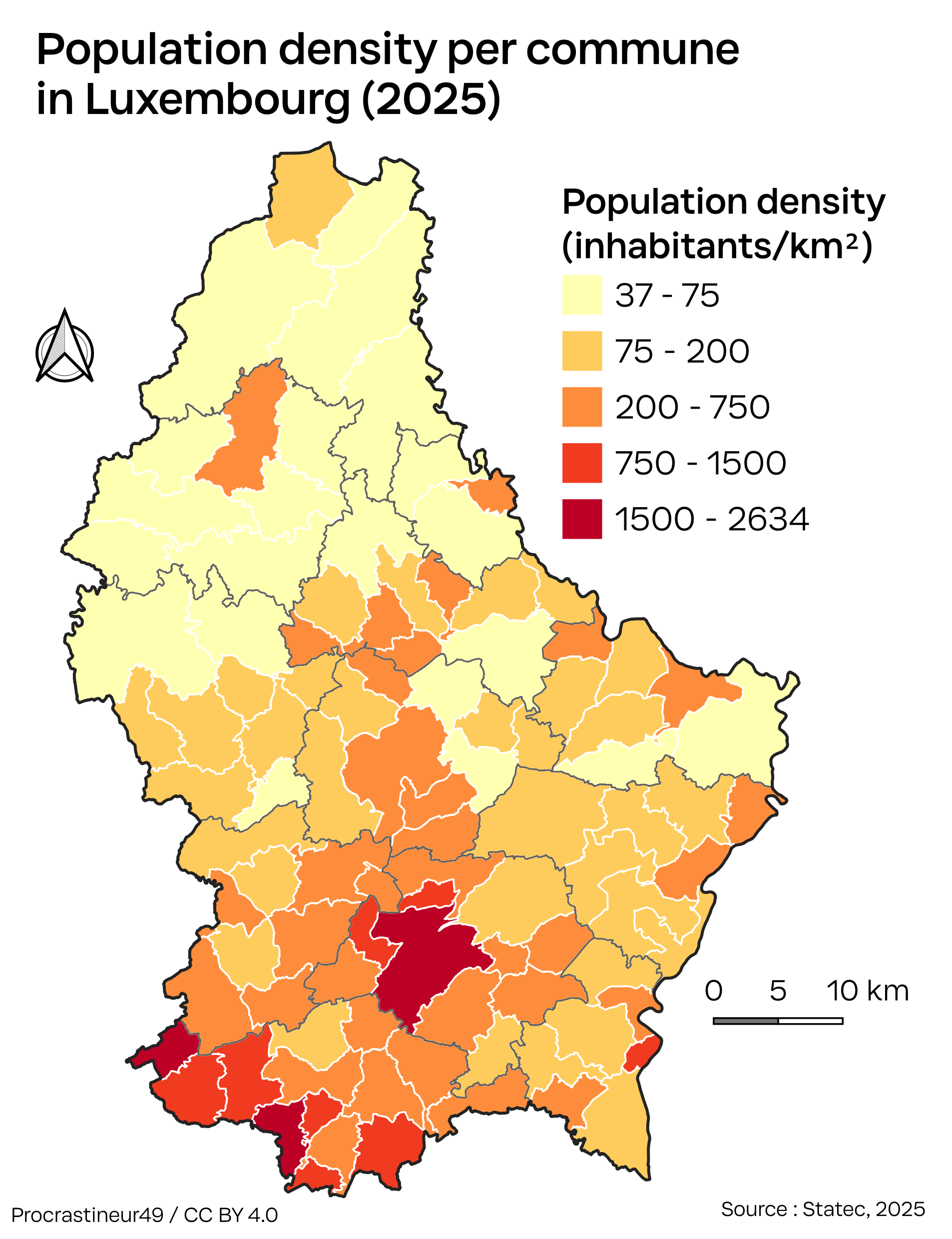
Population density in Luxembourg by commune

Historical population
Year	Pop.	±%
1821	134,082	—
1839	175,223	+30.7%
1851	194,719	+11.1%
1861	197,731	+1.5%
1871	204,028	+3.2%
1880	210,507	+3.2%
1890	211,481	+0.5%
1900	234,674	+11.0%
1910	259,027	+10.4%
1922	261,643	+1.0%
1930	299,782	+14.6%
1947	290,992	−2.9%
1960	314,889	+8.2%
1970	339,841	+7.9%
1981	364,302	+7.2%
1991	384,634	+5.6%
2001	439,539	+14.3%
2011	512,353	+16.6%
2021	643,941	+25.7%
Source: 2020 data

Demographic features of the population of Luxembourg include population density, education level, health of the populace, economic status, religious affiliations and other aspects of the population.

The following is an overview of the demographics of Luxembourg. Demographic topics include basic statistics, most populous cities, and religious affiliation.

The population of Luxembourg as of 1 January 2026 was 690,959 (53.4% Luxembourgers and 46.6% of foreign nationality).

The people of Luxembourg are called Luxembourgers.

== Population size and structure ==
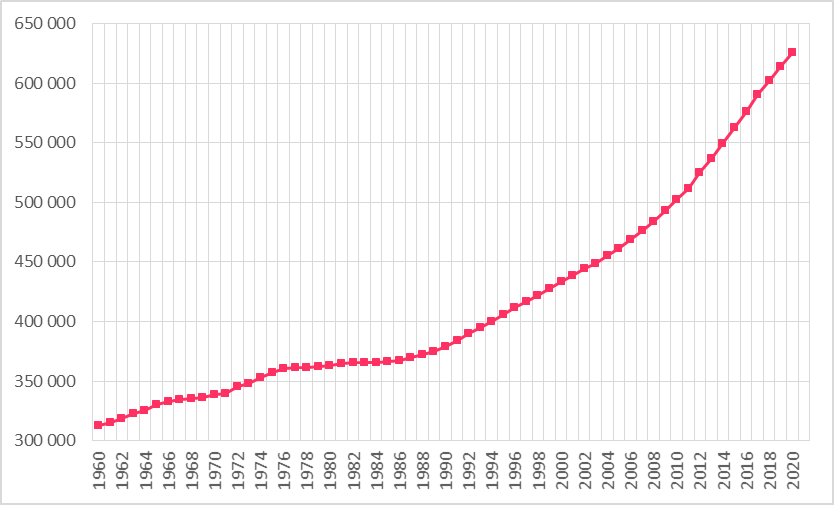
Demographics of Luxembourg, Data of FAO, year 2020

The population of Luxembourg in 2026 is 690,959.

=== Age structure of the population ===
Population Estimates by Sex and Age Group (01.I.2021):

Age group	Male	Female	Total	%
Total	319 456	315 274	634 730	100
0–4	16 900	16 355	33 255	5.24
5–9	17 641	16 618	34 259	5.40
10–14	17 291	16 590	33 881	5.34
15–19	17 179	15 892	33 071	5.21
20–24	19 975	18 739	38 714	6.10
25–29	24 373	23 227	47 600	7.50
30–34	25 947	25 103	51 050	8.04
35–39	24 798	24 587	49 385	7.78
40–44	24 400	23 790	48 190	7.59
45–49	23 728	22 533	46 261	7.29
50–54	24 324	22 633	46 957	7.40
55–59	22 789	21 070	43 859	6.91
60–64	18 034	17 477	35 511	5.59
65-69	13 904	14 266	28 170	4.44
70-74	11 176	11 828	23 004	3.62
75-79	7 593	8 844	16 437	2.59
80-84	5 290	7 492	12 782	2.01
85-89	2 853	5 009	7 862	1.24
90-94	1 100	2 493	3 593	0.57
95-99	148	657	805	0.13
100-104	10	67	77	0.01
105-109	2	3	5	<0.01
110+	1	1	2	<0.01
Age group	Male	Female	Total	Percent
0–14	51 832	49 563	101 395	15.97
15–64	225 547	215 051	440 598	69.42
65+	42 077	50 660	92 737	14.61

== Vital statistics ==
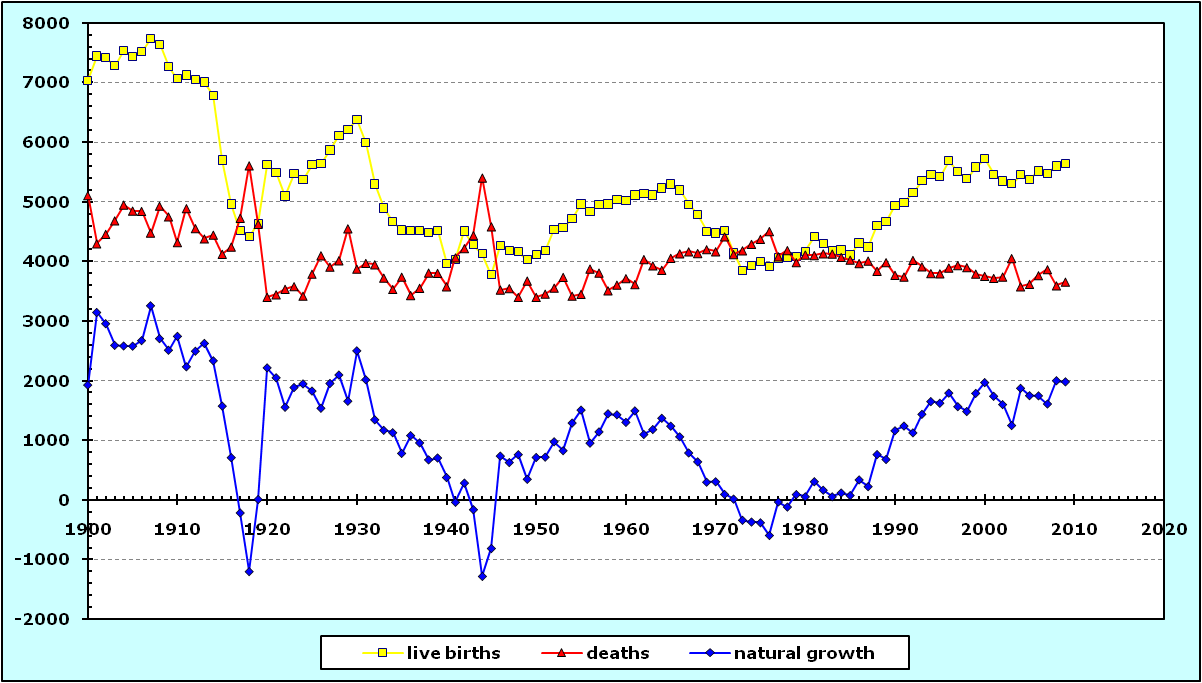
Vital statistics of Luxemburg 1900 till present.

The following table chronicles factors such as population, birth rates, and death rates in Luxembourg since 1900.

Notable events in Luxembourgish demographics:

- 1916–1918 – First World War
- 1940–1945 – Second World War
- 1973 – 1973 oil crisis

	Average population (31 December, from 1974 onwards)	Live births	Deaths	Natural change	Crude birth rate (per 1000)	Crude death rate (per 1000)	Natural change (per 1000)	Crude migration change (per 1000)	Total fertility rates
1900	234,000	7,037	5,109	1,928	30.1	21.9	8.2		
1901	236,000	7,444	4,300	3,144	31.5	18.2	13.3	-4.9	
1902	238,000	7,416	4,460	2,956	31.1	18.7	12.4	-4.1	
1903	241,000	7,279	4,686	2,593	30.3	19.5	10.8	1.7	
1904	243,000	7,535	4,952	2,583	31.0	20.4	10.6	-2.4	
1905	245,000	7,431	4,851	2,580	30.3	19.8	10.5	-2.4	
1906	248,000	7,516	4,844	2,672	30.3	19.6	10.8	-0.4	
1907	250,000	7,738	4,482	3,256	30.9	17.9	13.0	2.4	
1908	253,000	7,639	4,933	2,706	30.2	19.5	10.7	-1.9	
1909	256,000	7,264	4,752	2,512	28.4	18.6	9.8	-1.9	
1910	258,000	7,065	4,321	2,744	27.4	16.7	10.6	-1.2	
1911	260,000	7,126	4,892	2,234	27.4	18.8	8.6	-2.0	
1912	262,000	7,051	4,556	2,495	26.9	17.4	9.5	-1.3	
1913	264,000	7,009	4,383	2,626	26.5	16.6	9.9	-1.3	
1914	266,000	6,781	4,446	2,335	25.5	16.7	8.8	-1.6	
1915	265,000	5,701	4,126	1,575	21.5	15.6	5.9	-9.6	
1916	264,000	4,958	4,246	712	18.8	16.1	2.7	-8.3	
1917	263,000	4,516	4,730	-214	17.1	18.0	-0.8	-6.2	
1918	263,000	4,413	5,611	-1,198	16.8	21.4	-4.6	1.2	
1919	262,000	4,638	4,627	11	17.7	17.7	0.0	-4.6	
1920	261,000	5,621	3,404	2,217	21.6	13.1	8.5	-0.8	
1921	261,000	5,494	3,444	2,050	21.1	13.2	7.9	-0.8	
1922	262,000	5,094	3,538	1,556	19.5	13.5	5.9	-1.9	
1923	263,000	5,468	3,581	1,887	20.8	13.6	7.2	-1.7	
1924	266,000	5,369	3,421	1,948	20.2	12.9	7.3	4.1	
1925	268,000	5,619	3,791	1,828	21.0	14.1	6.8	1.8	
1926	270,000	5,639	4,100	1,539	20.9	15.2	5.7	0.6	
1927	278,000	5,864	3,909	1,955	21.1	14.1	7.0	20.6	
1928	287,000	6,114	4,017	2,097	21.3	14.0	7.3	27.8	
1929	292,000	6,210	4,553	1,657	21.3	15.6	5.7	6.0	
1930	297,000	6,377	3,876	2,501	21.4	13.0	8.4	8.0	
1931	300,000	5,988	3,971	2,017	20.0	13.3	6.7	0.7	
1932	299,000	5,295	3,949	1,346	17.7	13.2	4.5	-3.0	
1933	298,000	4,895	3,725	1,170	16.4	12.5	3.9	-2.7	
1934	298,000	4,665	3,535	1,130	15.7	11.9	3.8	-2.5	
1935	297,000	4,523	3,740	783	15.2	12.6	2.6	-2.9	
1936	298,000	4,514	3,433	1,081	15.2	11.5	3.6	-2.3	
1937	299,000	4,514	3,555	959	15.1	11.9	3.2	-2.4	
1938	301,000	4,486	3,811	675	14.9	12.7	2.2	-0.3	
1939	300,000	4,511	3,804	707	15.0	12.7	2.4	-5.7	
1940	296,000	3,959	3,580	379	13.4	12.1	1.3	-14.6	
1941	292,000	4,029	4,065	-36	13.8	13.9	-0.1	-13.4	
1942	290,000	4,506	4,220	286	15.6	14.6	1.0	-7.8	
1943	289,000	4,277	4,437	-160	14.8	15.4	-0.6	-2.9	
1944	285,000	4,128	5,406	-1,278	14.5	18.9	-4.5	-6.3	
1945	284,000	3,775	4,585	-810	13.3	16.2	-2.9	-3.6	
1946	286,000	4,263	3,525	738	14.9	12.3	2.6	9.2	
1947	289,000	4,178	3,548	630	14.5	12.3	2.2	8.4	
1948	292,000	4,162	3,400	762	14.3	11.6	2.6	8.2	
1949	294,000	4,026	3,676	350	13.7	12.5	1.2	-2.3	
1950	296,000	4,116	3,401	715	13.9	11.5	2.4	2.1	
1951	297,000	4,176	3,456	720	14.0	11.6	2.4	-0.7	
1952	299,000	4,535	3,557	978	15.2	11.9	3.3	1.0	
1953	301,000	4,565	3,737	828	15.2	12.4	2.7	0.0	
1954	303,000	4,713	3,421	1,292	15.6	11.3	4.3	0.3	
1955	305,000	4,962	3,453	1,509	16.3	11.3	5.0	0.0	
1956	307,000	4,833	3,878	955	15.8	12.6	3.1	-1.8	2.08
1957	309,000	4,954	3,811	1,143	16.1	12.4	3.7	-0.9	2.13
1958	310,000	4,959	3,512	1,447	16.0	11.3	4.7	-1.9	2.13
1959	312,000	5,037	3,607	1,430	16.1	11.6	4.6	-1.0	2.16
1960	314,000	5,019	3,716	1,303	16.0	11.8	4.1	-1.0	2.37
1961	317,000	5,112	3,616	1,496	16.1	11.4	4.7	1.0	2.42
1962	321,000	5,137	4,037	1,100	16.0	12.6	3.4	4.2	2.41
1963	324,000	5,112	3,929	1,183	15.8	12.1	3.7	0.7	2.37
1964	328,000	5,229	3,857	1,372	16.0	11.8	4.2	1.0	2.40
1965	332,000	5,297	4,057	1,240	16.0	12.2	3.7	0.2	2.39
1966	334,000	5,194	4,133	1,061	15.6	12.4	3.2	-1.3	2.36
1967	335,000	4,957	4,166	791	14.8	12.4	2.4	-0.8	2.25
1968	336,000	4,780	4,138	642	14.2	12.3	1.9	-0.4	2.14
1969	338,000	4,503	4,202	301	13.3	12.5	0.9	0.3	2.03
1970	339,000	4,476	4,168	308	13.2	12.3	0.9	-0.3	1.97
1971	342,000	4,512	4,416	96	13.2	12.9	0.3	6.5	1.96
1972	347,000	4,138	4,120	18	11.9	11.9	0.1	13.8	1.75
1973	351,000	3,847	4,184	-337	11.0	11.9	-1.0	10.5	1.58
1974	357,400	3,925	4,291	-366	11.1	12.1	-1.0	14.4	1.57
1975	360,500	3,997	4,376	-379	11.1	12.2	-1.1	9.7	1.55
1976	360,900	3,915	4,507	-592	10.8	12.5	-1.6	2.8	1.48
1977	361,700	4,053	4,083	-30	11.2	11.3	-0.1	2.3	1.49
1978	362,300	4,072	4,187	-115	11.2	11.6	-0.3	2.0	1.47
1979	363,500	4,078	3,985	93	11.2	11.0	0.3	3.1	1.47
1980	364,900	4,169	4,113	56	11.4	11.3	0.2	3.7	1.50
1981	365,600	4,414	4,105	309	12.1	11.2	0.8	1.1	1.55
1982	365,400	4,300	4,133	167	11.8	11.3	0.5	-1.0	1.49
1983	365,500	4,185	4,129	56	11.4	11.3	0.2	0.1	1.44
1984	366,100	4,192	4,072	120	11.5	11.1	0.3	1.3	1.42
1985	367,100	4,104	4,027	77	11.2	11.0	0.2	2.5	1.38
1986	369,400	4,309	3,970	339	11.7	10.8	0.9	5.3	1.44
1987	372,000	4,238	4,012	226	11.4	10.8	0.6	6.4	1.39
1988	375,800	4,603	3,840	763	12.3	10.3	2.0	8.2	1.51
1989	379,300	4,665	3,984	681	12.4	10.6	1.8	7.5	1.52
1990	384,400	4,936	3,773	1,163	12.9	9.9	3.0	10.4	1.62
1991	389,600	4,986	3,744	1,242	12.9	9.7	3.2	10.3	1.60
1992	394,800	5,149	4,022	1,127	13.1	10.3	2.9	10.5	1.67
1993	400,200	5,353	3,915	1,438	13.5	9.8	3.6	10.0	1.69
1994	405,700	5,451	3,800	1,651	13.5	9.4	4.1	9.6	1.72
1995	411,600	5,421	3,797	1,624	13.3	9.3	4.0	10.5	1.67
1996	416,900	5,689	3,895	1,794	13.7	9.4	4.3	8.5	1.76
1997	422,100	5,503	3,937	1,566	13.1	9.4	3.7	8.7	1.71
1998	427,400	5,386	3,901	1,485	12.7	9.2	3.5	9.0	1.67
1999	433,600	5,582	3,793	1,789	13.0	8.8	4.2	10.3	1.71
2000	439,000	5,723	3,754	1,969	13.1	8.6	4.5	7.9	1.78
2001	444,000	5,459	3,719	1,740	12.4	8.4	3.9	11.0	1.66
2002	448,300	5,345	3,744	1,601	12.0	8.4	3.6	6.1	1.63
2003	455,000	5,303	4,053	1,250	11.7	9.0	2.8	14.7	1.62
2004	461,200	5,452	3,578	1,874	11.9	7.8	4.1	9.5	1.66
2005	469,100	5,371	3,621	1,750	11.5	7.8	3.8	16.7	1.62
2006	476,200	5,514	3,766	1,748	11.7	8.0	3.7	11.4	1.64
2007	483,800	5,477	3,866	1,611	11.4	8.1	3.4	12.6	1.61
2008	493,500	5,596	3,595	2,001	11.5	7.4	4.1	15.9	1.60
2009	502,100	5,638	3,657	1,982	11.3	7.3	4.0	13.4	1.59
2010	511,800	5,874	3,760	2,114	11.6	7.4	4.2	15.1	1.63
2011	524,900	5,639	3,819	1,820	10.9	7.4	3.5	25.2	1.51
2012	537,000	6,026	3,876	2,150	11.4	7.3	4.1	22.6	1.57
2013	549,700	6,115	3,822	2,293	11.2	7.0	4.2	19.4	1.55
2014	556,000	6,070	3,841	2,229	10.9	6.9	4.0	7.4	1.50
2015	576,200	6,115	3,983	2,132	10.9	7.0	3.9	32.5	1.47
2016	590,667	6,050	3,967	2,083	10.4	6.8	3.6	21.5	1.40
2017	602,005	6,174	4,263	1,911	10.4	7.1	3.3	16.0	1.39
2018	613,894	6,274	4,318	1,956	10.3	7.1	3.2	16.5	1.38
2019	626,108	6,230	4,283	1,947	10.0	6.9	3.1	16.7	1.34
2020	634,730	6,459	4,609	1,850	10.2	7.3	2.9	13.5	1.37
2021	645,397	6,690	4,489	2,201	10.4	7.0	3.4	13.3	1.38
2022	660,809	6,495	4,449	2,046	9.8	6.7	3.1	20.7	1.31
2023	672,050	6,320	4,431	1,889	9.5	6.6	2.9	14.2	1.25
2024	681,973	6,459	4,471	1,988	9.6	6.7	3.0	11.8	1.25
2025	690,959	6,439	4,396	2,043	9.3	6.4	2.9	10.1	1.23

=== Current vital statistics ===
Period	Live births	Deaths	Natural increase
January - September 2024	4,800	3,289	+1,511
January - September 2025	4,754	3,297	+1,457
Difference	▼ –46 (−0.96%)	+8 (+0.24%)	▼ –54

=== Fertility ===
In 2020, 64% of children born in Luxembourg were to mothers of foreign origin, both from other EU member states and from non-EU countries.

=== Life expectancy ===
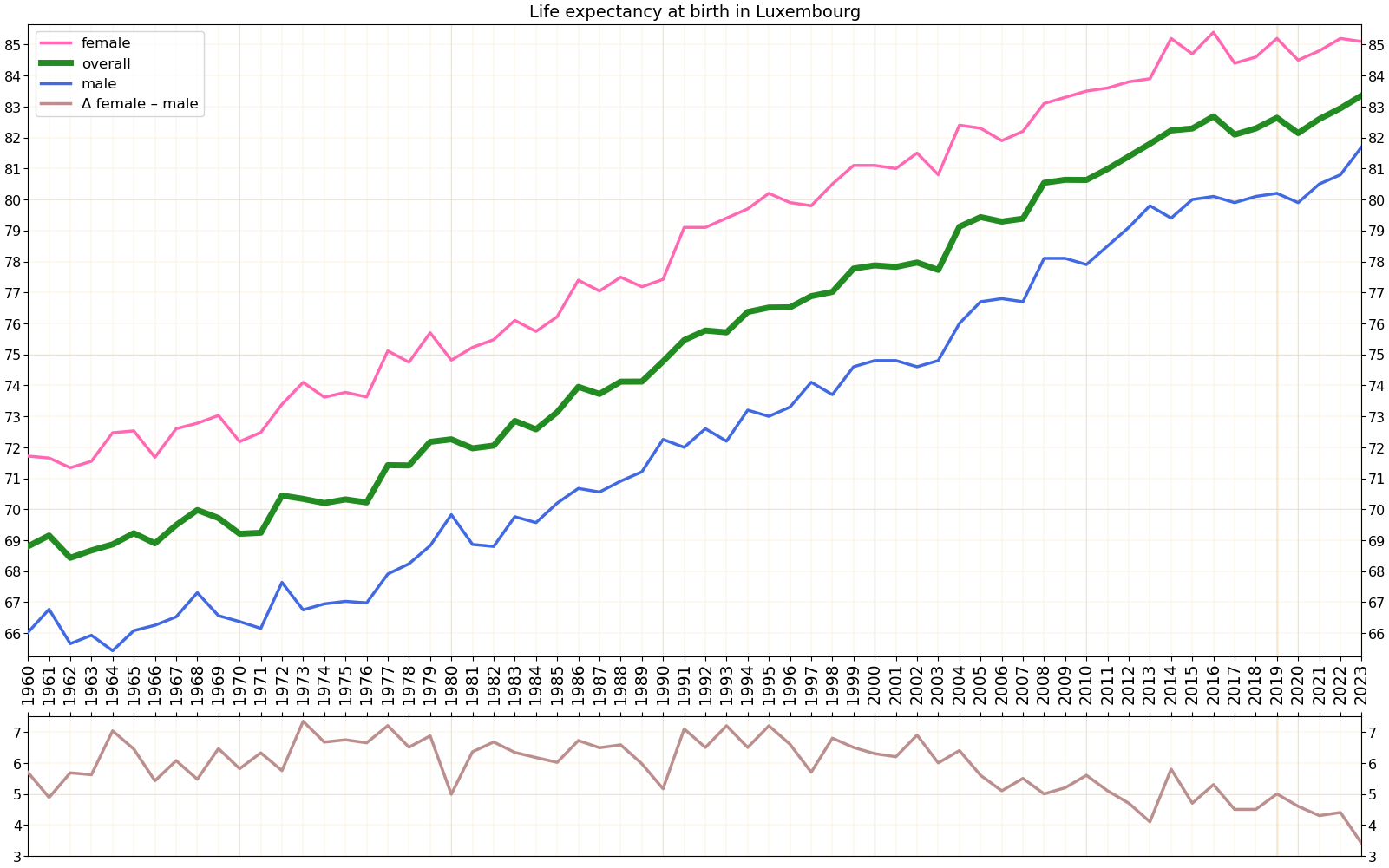
Life expectancy at birth in Luxembourg

Period	Life expectancy in Years	Period	Life expectancy in Years
1950–1955	66.0	1990–1995	75.8
1955–1960	67.6	1995–2000	77.0
1960–1965	69.1	2000–2005	78.3
1965–1970	69.8	2005–2010	79.5
1970–1975	70.2	2010–2015	81.2
1975–1980	71.5	2015–2020	82.0
1980–1985	72.9	2020–2025	82.8
1985–1990	74.5	2025–2030	83.6

Source: UN World Population Prospects

== Nationality ==
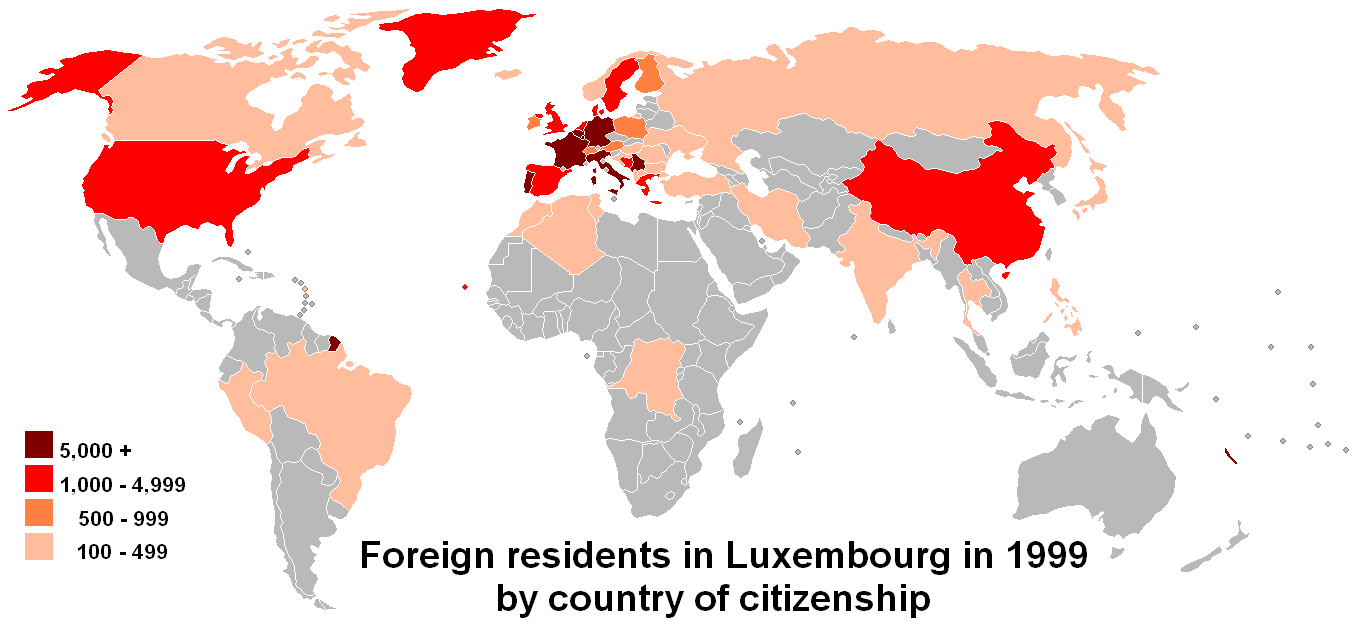

Luxembourg does not formally collect ethnic or racial data of its citizens. The foreign population resident in Luxembourg currently numbers over 322,050, corresponding to 46.6% of the total population (compared to 13.2% in 1961). That means there are currently almost as many immigrants as there are native citizens. These immigrants are overwhelmingly nationals of EU countries (accounting for over 80%), by far the greater part of whom originally come from Portugal, Italy and the two neighbouring countries, France and Belgium. For some years, there has also been a large increase in the number of immigrants and asylum seekers from the countries of Eastern Europe, and especially the new republics to have emerged from the former Yugoslavia (Bosnia and Herzegovina, Serbia, and Montenegro). These immigrants include a considerable proportion of young people. Immigrants (especially asylum seekers) have a strong impact on the birth rate, accounting for nearly 50% of births in Luxembourg. The population of Ukrainian immigrants increased dramatically following the 2022 invasion of Ukraine, representing nearly a percent of the total population as of 2023.

A more detailed breakdown by nationality shows that the Portuguese community is still the largest group, accounting for around 27% of the foreign population. The Italian population has been stable for the past ten years at approximately 25,000. Some 80,000 foreigners come from bordering countries (France, Belgium and Germany).

Nationality
1 January 2026
1	Luxembourg	368,909
2	(European Union) Portugal	88,260
3	(European Union) France	49,255
4	(European Union) Italy	25,529
5	(European Union) Belgium	18,253
6	(European Union) Germany	12,107
7	(European Union) Spain	10,276
8	(European Union) Romania	6,913
9	Ukraine	6,028
10	India	5,728
11	(European Union) Poland	5,040
12	China	4,937
13	(European Union) Greece	4,781
14	Syria	3,944
15	(European Union) Netherlands	3,766
16	Brazil	3,677
17	United Kingdom	3,443
18	Eritrea	3,251
19	Montenegro	2,727
20	Cape Verde	2,668
21	Russia	2,379
22	Morocco	2,358
23	(European Union) Ireland	2,325
24	United States	2,259
25	Turkey	2,093
-	Other	50,053

View source data.
View source data.
View source data.

=== Net migration ===
Luxembourg net migration, 2015-present
Year	Total Immigration	Total Emigration	Total Net Migration	Luxembourg Nationals Arrivals	Luxembourg Nationals Departures	Net Migration for Luxembourg Nationals
2015	23,803	12,644	11,159	1,195	2,199	-1,004
2016	22,888	13,442	9,446	1,331	2,106	-775
2017	24,379	13,831	10,548	1,199	2,248	-1,049
2018	24,644	13,985	10,659	1,291	2,339	-1,048
2019	26,668	15,593	11,075	1,518	2,585	-1,067
2020	22,490	14,870	7,620	1,520	2,822	-1,302
2021	25,335	15,959	9,376	1,577	3,063	-1,486
2022	31,433	17,227	14,206	1,582	3,273	-1,691
2023	26,964	16,588	10,376	1,820	3,102	-1,282
2024	25,725	16,444	9,281	1,830	3,346	-1,516

== Language ==
Census 2011	Luxembourgish	Portuguese	French	German	Italian	English	Dutch	Spanish	Serbian	other
main language	55.8	15.7	12.1	3.1	2.9	2.1	0.9	0.8	0.5	
spoken at home	64.9	8.8	31.2	11.6	5.1	7.2				10.4
use in school	79.6	10.2	49.1	39.3	1.7	20.4				6.5
use at the workplace	60.5	14.6	68.2	34.2	4.8	28.5				7.3

Census 2021	Luxembourgish	Portuguese	French	English	Italian	German	other
main language	48.9	15.4	14.9	3.6	3.6	2.9	10.8
spoken at home	52.3	17.5	52.3	19.3	4.8	12.4	
use in school	78.2	10.4	76.5	34.6	2.1	32.1	
use at the workplace	65.4	13.9	82.2	36.7	3.9	29.8	

The linguistic situation in Luxembourg is complicated. The "national language" is Luxembourgish, a West Germanic language based on the same German dialect as in the neighbouring part of Germany. Three languages are used by the administration: Luxembourgish, French and German. French is the only language of legislation.

According to the census of 2011, the residents of Luxembourg answered very differently about their use of language, depending on the context, this observation persisted in the 2021 census. (see tables).

== Religion ==
The predominant religion of the Luxembourg population is Roman Catholic, with Protestant, Anglican, Jewish, Muslim and Hindu minorities. According to a 1979 law, the government forbids collection of data on religious practices, but over 90% is estimated to be baptized Catholic (the Virgin Mary is the Patroness of the city of Luxembourg).

The Lutherans are the largest Protestant denomination in the country. Muslims are estimated to number approximately 6,000 persons, notably including 1,500 refugees from Montenegro; Orthodox (Albanian, Greek, Montenegrin, Serbian, Russian, and Romanian) adherents are estimated to number approximately 5,000 persons, along with approximately 1,000 Jews. Freedom of religion is provided by the Luxembourg Constitution.

== See also ==
- Demographics of Belgium
- Demographics of France
- Demographics of Germany
- Demographics of the Netherlands
