= Demographics of Wallis and Futuna =

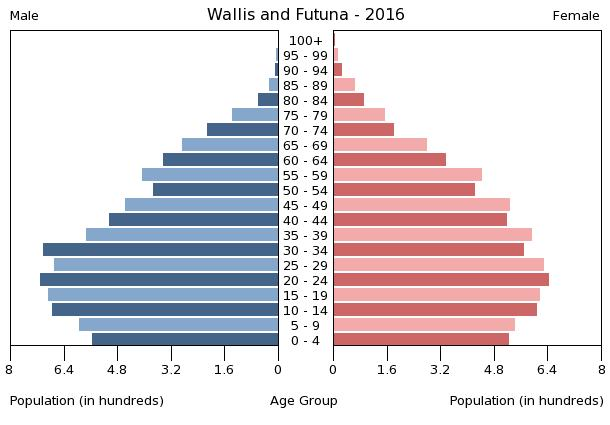
Population pyramid of Wallis and Futuna, 2016

Demographic features of the population of Wallis and Futuna include population density, ethnicity, religious affiliations and other aspects. Statistics are from INSEE and the United Nations Demographic Yearbooks.

== Population ==
Census population

Year	Pop.	±% p.a.
1969	8,546	—
1976	9,192	+1.05%
1983	12,408	+4.38%
1990	13,705	+1.43%
1996	14,166	+0.55%

Year	Pop.	±% p.a.
2003	14,944	+0.77%
2008	13,445	−2.09%
2013	12,197	−1.93%
2018	11,558	−1.07%
2023	11,151	−0.71%

Source: INSEE

Between July 24 and August 19, 2023, 11,151 people were counted in Wallis and Futuna (8,088 in Wallis and 3,063 in Futuna). Since 2003, these French Pacific islands have been facing a decrease in their population due to a strong emigration of young people of university or working age. This decrease was particularly marked between 2003 and 2013 (-2.0% on average per year), then it eased between 2013 and 2023 (-0.9% per year). The majority of the inhabitants (72.5%) live in Wallis, which has the highest population density of the two inhabited islands (104 inhabitants per km² compared to only 48 inhabitants per km² in Futuna). Over the last twenty years, the population has fallen by 25.4%, but the population decline has been half as pronounced in Wallis as in Futuna (respectively -19.7% versus -37.1%).

The evolution of a population depends on the natural balance and the migratory balance. In Wallis and Futuna, natural increase has been divided by five in past twenty years. As the balance of births over deaths is very slightly in surplus, the migratory deficit explains the decline in the population. Between the censuses of 2018 and 2023, natural increase was only 42 people on average per year. It contributed 0.4% to the average annual population increase, compared to 0.7% between 2013 and 2018 (80 people per year) and 1.5% over the period 1996-2003 (218 people per year). However, the migratory balance has been in deficit since 1969 (except during the period from 1976 to 1983). It has contributed to the decline in population over the last five years (-1.1% per year on average), but less significantly than before (-3.2% per year on average between 2003 and 2008).

=== Structure of the population ===
Population by Sex and Age Group (Census 22.VII.2013):

Age group	Male	Female	Total	%
Total	5 927	6 270	12 197	100
0–4	507	490	997	8.17
5–9	560	576	1 136	9.31
10–14	687	610	1 297	10.63
15–19	615	553	1 168	9.58
20–24	257	326	583	4.78
25–29	266	334	600	4.92
30–34	315	404	719	5.89
35–39	398	466	864	7.08
40–44	434	488	922	7.56
45–49	354	408	762	6.25
50–54	344	417	761	6.24
55–59	352	317	669	5.48
60–64	310	261	571	4.68
65-69	238	224	462	3.79
70-74	153	156	309	2.53
75-79	82	119	201	1.65
80-84	35	76	111	0.91
85-89	17	33	50	0.41
90-94	3	12	15	0.12
95+	0	0	0	0
Age group	Male	Female	Total	Percent
0–14	1 754	1 676	3 430	28.12
15–64	3 645	3 974	7 619	62.47
65+	528	620	1 148	9.41

== Vital statistics ==
Births and deaths

Year	Population	Live births	Deaths	Natural increase	Crude birth rate	Crude death rate	Rate of natural increase	TFR
1996	14,166	301	48	253	21.2	3.4	17.8	
1997		264	49	215				
1998		268	49	219				
1999		345	51	294				
2000		269	63	206				
2001		266	69	197				
2002		262	67	195				
2003	14,944	290	88	202	19.4	5.9	13.5	
2004		241	72	169				
2005		223	65	158				
2006		220	77	143				
2007		215	68	147				
2008	13,445	185	90	95	13.8	6.7	7.1	
2009		230	63	167				
2010		163	76	87				
2011		204	69	135				
2012		175	66	109				
2013	12,197	149	72	77	12.2	5.9	6.3	1.897
2014		141	65	76				
2015		156	60	96				
2016		155	66	89				
2017		151	84	67				
2018	11,558	125	74	51	10.8	6.4	4.8	1.753
2019		147	56	91				
2020		111	68	43				
2021		103	82	21				

== Ethnic groups ==
- Polynesian
- French

== Languages ==
- Wallisian (indigenous Polynesian language): 58.9%
- Futunian: 30.1%
- French (officials): 10.8%.
- Other: 0.2%

== Religions ==
- Roman Catholic 99%
- Other 1%

== See also ==
- Wallis and Futuna
- Europeans in Oceania
- Demographics of France
