= Demographics of Solomon Islands =

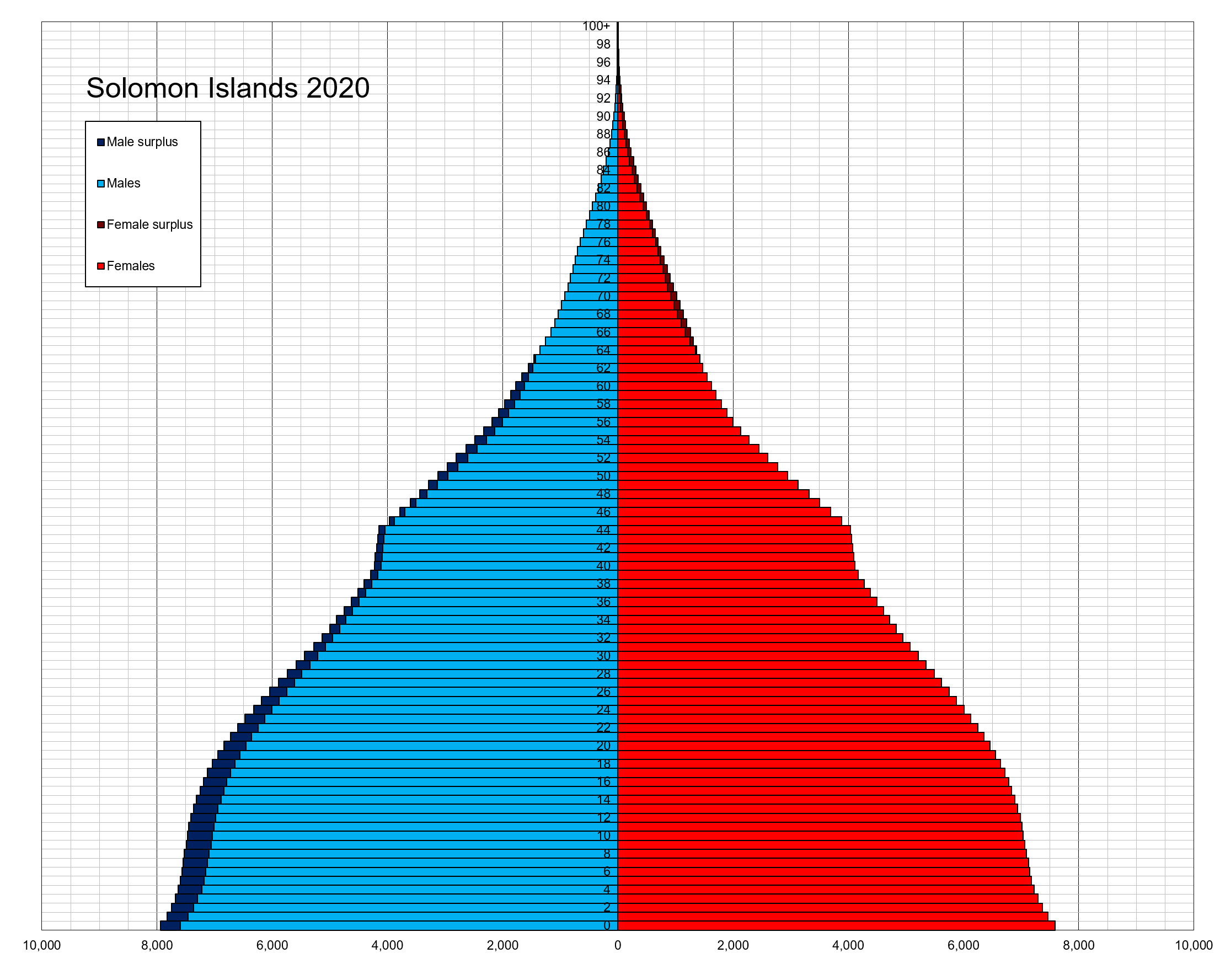
- Population pyramid of the Solomon Islands in 2020
- Population: 702,694 (2022 est.)
- Growth rate: 1.72% (2022 est.)
- Birth rate: 22.71 births/1,000 population (2022 est.)
- Death rate: 3.96 deaths/1,000 population (2022 est.)
- Net migration rate: -1.55 migrant(s)/1,000 population (2022 est.)

Age structure
- 0–14 years: 32.99%
- 65 and over: 4.51%

Nationality
- Nationality: Solomon Islander
- Major ethnic: Melanesian (95.3%)

Population, fertility rate and net reproduction rate, United Nations estimates

Demographic features of the population of the Solomon Islands include population density, ethnicity, education level, health of the populace, economic status, religious affiliations and other aspects of the nation.

The Solomon Islanders comprise diverse cultures, languages, and customs. Of its population 94.5% are Melanesian, 3% Polynesian, and 1.2% Micronesian. In addition, small numbers of Europeans and Chinese are registered. About 120 vernaculars are spoken.

Most people reside in small, widely dispersed settlements along the coasts. Sixty per cent live in localities with fewer than 200 persons, and only 10% reside in urban areas.

The capital city of Honiara is situated on Guadalcanal, the largest island. The other principal towns are Gizo, Auki, and Kirakira.

Most Solomon Islanders are Christian, with the Anglican, Methodist, Roman Catholic, South Seas Evangelical, and Seventh-day Adventist faiths predominating. About 5% of the population maintain traditional beliefs.

The chief characteristics of the traditional Melanesian social structure are:

- The practice of subsistence economy;
- The recognition of bonds of kinship, with important obligations extending beyond the immediate family group;
- Generally egalitarian relationships, emphasising acquired rather than inherited status; and
- A strong attachment of the people to the land.

Most Solomon Islanders maintain this traditional social structure and find their roots in village life.

== Population ==
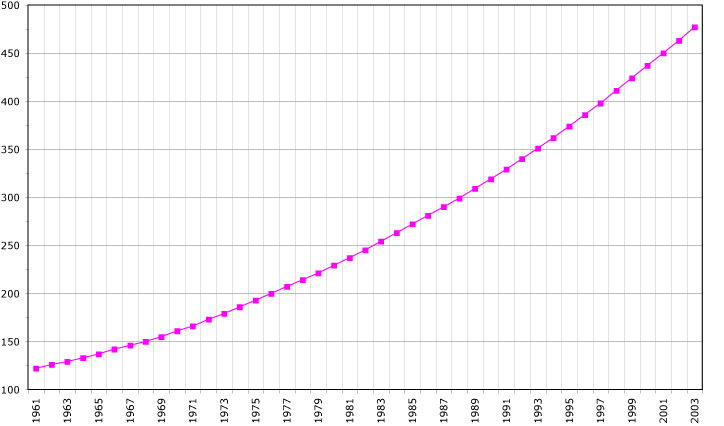
Demographics of the Solomon Islands, Data of FAO, year 2005; Number of inhabitants in thousands.

=== Structure of the population ===
Population by Sex and Age Group (Census 22.XI.2009):

Age group	Male	Female	Total	%
Total	264 455	251 415	515 870	100
0–4	39 728	36 499	76 227	14.78
5–9	36 974	34 152	71 126	13.79
10–14	32 562	29 369	61 931	12.01
15–19	26 189	25 023	51 212	9.93
20–24	22 399	23 020	45 419	8.80
25–29	20 794	21 880	42 674	8.27
30–34	18 807	18 785	37 592	7.29
35–39	17 010	16 141	33 151	6.43
40–44	12 070	11 568	23 638	4.58
45–49	10 189	9 524	19 713	3.82
50–54	7 498	6 841	14 339	2.78
55–59	6 111	5 676	11 787	2.28
60–64	4 535	4 381	8 916	1.73
65-69	3 693	3 328	7 021	1.36
70-74	2 402	2 296	4 698	0.91
75-79	1 784	1 590	3 374	0.65
80-84	800	725	1 525	0.30
85-89	512	382	894	0.17
90-94	170	131	301	0.06
95+	228	104	332	0.06
Age group	Male	Female	Total	Per cent
0–14	109 264	100 020	209 284	40.57
15–64	145 602	142 839	288 441	55.91
65+	9 589	8 556	18 145	3.52

Population Estimates by Sex and Age Group (01.VII.2021) (Projections based on adjusted 2009 census counts.):

Age group	Male	Female	Total	%
Total	360 961	346 523	707 484	100
0–4	42 814	40 013	82 826	11.71
5–9	42 227	39 814	82 041	11.60
10–14	41 682	39 525	81 206	11.48
15–19	39 816	37 593	77 409	10.94
20–24	34 052	31 980	66 032	9.33
25–29	28 304	26 540	54 843	7.75
30–34	25 926	24 335	50 261	7.10
35–39	23 401	22 340	45 740	6.47
40–44	19 810	19 951	39 760	5.62
45–49	17 196	17 749	34 945	4.94
50–54	13 460	13 628	27 088	3.83
55–59	10 280	10 328	20 608	2.91
60–64	7 637	7 601	15 238	2.15
65-69	5 588	5 656	11 243	1.59
70-74	3 905	4 262	8 167	1.15
75-79	2 596	2 800	5 396	0.76
80+	2 269	2 411	4 679	0.66
Age group	Male	Female	Total	Per cent
0–14	126 723	119 352	246 075	34.78
15–64	219 880	212 042	431 922	61.05
65+	14 358	15 129	29 487	4.17

== Vital statistics ==
Births and deaths

	Mid-year population (thousands)	Live births (thousands)	Deaths (thousands)	Natural change (thousands)	Crude birth rate (per 1000)	Crude death rate (per 1000)	Natural change (per 1000)	Total fertility rate (TFR)	Infant mortality (per 1000 live births)	Life expectancy (in years)
1950	105,209	4,365	2,606	1,759	41.5	24.8	16.7	7.00	166.4	40.03
1951	107,119	4,519	2,536	1,983	42.2	23.7	18.5	7.02	163.8	40.53
1952	109,309	4,682	2,505	2,177	42.9	22.9	19.9	7.04	158.7	41.29
1953	111,760	4,816	2,472	2,344	43.1	22.1	21.0	7.01	153.7	42.08
1954	114,448	4,968	2,455	2,513	43.5	21.5	22.0	7.00	148.7	42.79
1955	117,314	5,119	2,432	2,687	43.7	20.8	22.9	6.99	143.8	43.58
1956	120,288	5,266	2,643	2,623	43.9	22.0	21.8	6.97	144.5	41.87
1957	123,373	5,415	2,366	3,049	43.9	19.2	24.7	6.95	132.9	45.28
1958	126,649	5,602	2,338	3,264	44.3	18.5	25.8	6.98	127.9	46.12
1959	130,071	5,774	2,315	3,459	44.4	17.8	26.6	6.97	123.0	46.91
1960	133,440	5,948	2,282	3,666	44.5	17.1	27.4	6.97	118.3	47.74
1961	136,780	6,085	2,291	3,794	44.4	16.7	27.7	6.97	113.6	48.43
1962	140,254	6,225	2,283	3,942	44.3	16.3	28.1	6.97	109.1	49.25
1963	143,863	6,357	2,274	4,083	44.1	15.8	28.3	6.97	104.6	50.05
1964	147,609	6,495	2,260	4,235	43.9	15.3	28.6	6.96	100.3	50.86
1965	151,495	6,624	2,246	4,378	43.7	14.8	28.9	6.95	96.0	51.66
1966	155,514	6,759	2,229	4,530	43.4	14.3	29.1	6.94	91.7	52.46
1967	159,667	6,901	2,216	4,685	43.2	13.9	29.3	6.94	87.5	53.21
1968	163,973	7,023	2,172	4,851	42.8	13.2	29.5	6.92	82.6	54.24
1969	168,399	7,224	2,141	5,083	42.8	12.7	30.1	6.97	78.0	55.16
1970	172,833	7,426	2,121	5,305	42.8	12.2	30.6	7.00	73.3	56.07
1971	177,264	7,604	2,116	5,488	42.8	11.9	30.9	7.03	68.9	56.98
1972	181,876	7,784	2,069	5,715	42.7	11.3	31.3	7.06	64.6	57.80
1973	186,816	7,995	2,027	5,968	42.7	10.8	31.9	7.09	60.7	58.59
1974	192,155	8,234	1,991	6,243	42.8	10.3	32.4	7.13	57.0	59.36
1975	197,853	8,395	2,161	6,234	42.4	10.9	31.5	7.07	56.2	58.08
1976	204,082	8,591	1,919	6,672	42.1	9.4	32.7	7.02	50.6	60.75
1977	210,932	8,824	1,937	6,887	41.8	9.2	32.7	6.95	48.3	60.86
1978	218,193	9,061	1,868	7,193	41.5	8.6	33.0	6.87	45.3	61.91
1979	225,786	9,303	1,864	7,439	41.2	8.3	33.0	6.78	43.3	62.39
1980	233,668	9,563	1,869	7,694	40.9	8.0	32.9	6.71	41.4	62.80
1981	241,827	9,817	1,881	7,936	40.6	7.8	32.8	6.61	39.8	63.16
1982	250,250	10,084	1,896	8,188	40.3	7.6	32.7	6.52	38.4	63.51
1983	258,945	10,369	1,924	8,445	40.1	7.4	32.6	6.42	37.1	63.76
1984	267,913	10,660	1,955	8,705	39.8	7.3	32.5	6.31	36.0	64.00
1985	277,158	10,969	1,981	8,988	39.6	7.2	32.4	6.22	35.0	64.29
1986	286,527	11,280	2,121	9,159	39.4	7.4	32.0	6.11	35.3	63.76
1987	295,836	11,536	2,039	9,497	39.0	6.9	32.1	5.99	33.2	64.76
1988	305,132	11,818	2,063	9,755	38.7	6.8	31.9	5.88	32.5	64.97
1989	314,560	12,091	2,093	9,998	38.4	6.6	31.7	5.78	31.7	65.19
1990	324,171	12,353	2,125	10,228	38.1	6.5	31.5	5.66	31.0	65.39
1991	333,952	12,615	2,160	10,455	37.7	6.5	31.3	5.55	30.3	65.58
1992	343,916	12,898	2,197	10,701	37.5	6.4	31.1	5.45	29.5	65.77
1993	354,086	13,248	2,237	11,011	37.4	6.3	31.1	5.38	28.8	65.96
1994	364,505	13,622	2,272	11,350	37.3	6.2	31.1	5.31	28.1	66.19
1995	375,189	13,988	2,315	11,673	37.2	6.2	31.1	5.24	27.5	66.38
1996	386,069	14,209	2,354	11,855	36.8	6.1	30.7	5.12	26.9	66.59
1997	397,050	14,391	2,402	11,989	36.2	6.0	30.2	4.99	26.5	66.74
1998	408,145	14,686	2,449	12,237	35.9	6.0	29.9	4.90	26.1	66.92
1999	419,229	14,967	2,502	12,465	35.6	6.0	29.7	4.82	25.7	67.07
2000	429,978	15,207	2,560	12,647	35.3	5.9	29.3	4.76	25.3	67.23
2001	440,395	15,457	2,615	12,842	35.0	5.9	29.1	4.69	25.1	67.36
2002	450,760	15,672	2,667	13,005	34.7	5.9	28.8	4.63	24.8	67.52
2003	461,216	15,914	2,722	13,192	34.4	5.9	28.5	4.57	24.6	67.64
2004	471,785	16,146	2,770	13,376	34.1	5.9	28.3	4.52	24.4	67.80
2005	482,486	16,400	2,821	13,579	33.9	5.8	28.1	4.48	24.2	67.94
2006	493,430	16,834	2,870	13,964	34.0	5.8	28.2	4.48	23.9	68.09
2007	504,619	17,123	2,968	14,155	33.8	5.9	28.0	4.44	23.8	67.99
2008	516,001	17,424	2,958	14,466	33.7	5.7	27.9	4.41	23.0	68.40
2009	527,833	17,763	3,024	14,739	33.6	5.7	27.8	4.39	22.9	68.47
2010	540,394	18,223	3,041	15,182	33.6	5.6	28.0	4.40	22.0	68.73
2011	553,721	18,661	3,076	15,585	33.6	5.5	28.1	4.41	21.4	68.91
2012	567,763	19,122	3,110	16,012	33.6	5.5	28.2	4.41	20.8	69.08
2013	582,365	19,592	3,162	16,430	33.6	5.4	28.2	4.42	20.3	69.19
2014	597,375	20,031	3,235	16,796	33.5	5.4	28.1	4.42	20.4	69.23
2015	612,660	20,203	3,227	16,976	32.9	5.3	27.7	4.36	19.1	69.58
2016	628,102	20,365	3,255	17,110	32.4	5.2	27.2	4.29	18.5	69.80
2017	643,634	20,458	3,293	17,165	31.7	5.1	26.6	4.22	18.0	69.99
2018	659,249	20,608	3,335	17,273	31.2	5.1	26.2	4.16	17.4	70.17
2019	674,993	20,791	3,372	17,419	30.8	5.0	25.8	4.10	16.9	70.38
2020	691,191	20,904	3,515	17,389	30.2	5.1	25.1	4.04	16.5	70.20
2021	707,851	21,098	3,561	17,537	29.8	5.0	24.8	3.98	15.8	70.35

== Ethnic groups ==
- Melanesian 95.3%
- Polynesian 3.1%
- Micronesian 1.2%,
- Other 0.3%

== Languages ==
- Melanesian Pidgin (lingua franca)
- English (official) (spoken by only 1–2% of the population)
- 120 Languages of the Solomon Islands archipelago

== Religion ==
- Christian 96.6%
  - Protestant 74.6%
    - Church of Melanesia 32.2%
    - South Sea Evangelical 17.3%
    - Seventh-day Adventist 11.6%
    - United Church 9.3%
    - Christian Fellowship Church 2.2%
    - Christian OutReach Church 0.8%
    - Assembly of God 0.5%
    - Pentecostal 0.4%
    - Baptist Church 0.3%
  - Roman Catholic 19.9%
  - Jehovah's Witness 2%
- Baha'i faith 0.4%
- Muslim 0.2%
- Other 2%
- No Religion/Athiesm 0.2%
- Refuse to answer 0.01%
