= List of countries by total fertility rate =

Map of countries by total fertility rate (2022–2023), referring to the average number of children that are born to a woman over her lifetime, according to the Population Reference Bureau.

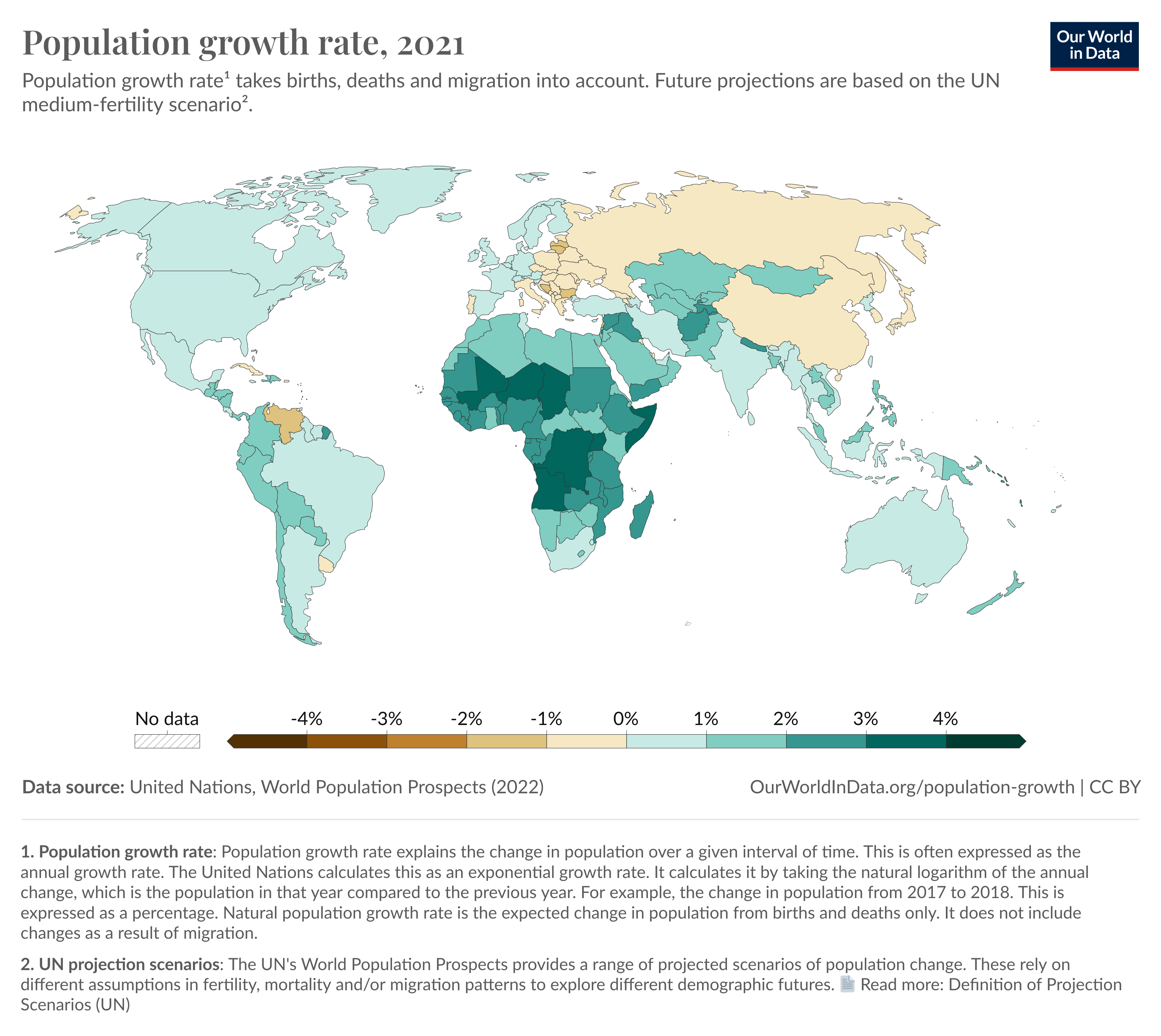
Global rates of population growth and decline (2021–2022); population growth rate takes birth, death, and migration rates into account. Future projections are based on the United Nations World Population Prospects (from 1950 until 2100).

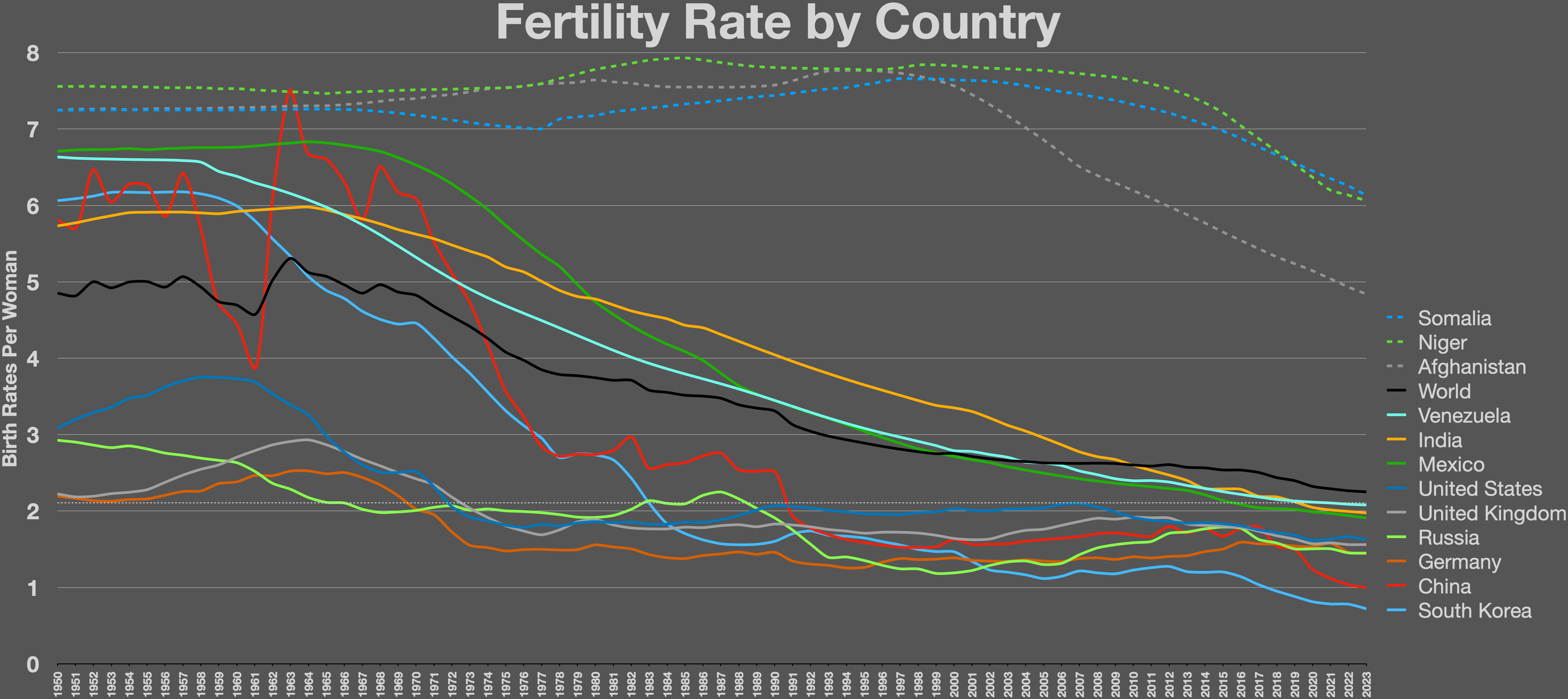
Evolution of fertility rates in 12 selected countries and the world (1950–2023)

Total fertility rate (TFR) is the expected number of children born per woman. Developing countries in Africa and the Middle East typically have the highest TFR, while developed economies, particularly those in Asia, are among the lowest. The TFR at which population is stable or growing, known as the replacement rate, is 2.2; below this is sub-replacement fertility. As of 2026, global TFR is 2.23, with the highest in Chad (5.84), Somalia (5.81), and DR Congo (5.80), and the lowest in Macau (0.70), Hong Kong (0.75), and South Korea (0.76).

== Methodology ==
The first lists show the most recent year where there is published total fertility rate (TFR) data ranked by sovereign states and dependencies, and are ordered by organization type – intergovernmental, governmental, or non-governmental organization that searched, organized, and published the data.

The United Nations ranking list is based on estimates from the World Population Prospects, published by the Population Division of the United Nations Department of Economic and Social Affairs (UNDESA). The World Population Prospects provides the official United Nations demographic estimates and projections, including Total Fertility Rate (TFR), for all countries and territories of the world. These estimates are widely used as a standard reference by international organizations, governments, and researchers, and are derived from analysis of national data sources such as censuses, surveys, and vital registration systems.

The World Bank ranking list is based on the data for the year 2020 published online. The World Bank is a United Nations international financial institution, a component of the World Bank Group, and a member of the United Nations Development Group, but it also collects and analyses information on demography issues based on international and national sources: (1) United Nations Population Division: World Population Prospects, (2) United Nations Statistics Division: Population and Vital Statistics Report (various years), (3) Census reports and other statistical publications from national statistical offices, (4) Eurostat: Demographic Statistics, (5) Secretariat of the Pacific Community: Statistics and Demography Programme, and (6) U.S. Census Bureau International Database. (Note: Sometimes the World Bank changes its figures of fertility rates for a certain year due to more accurate and updated information from sources. Because of that, sometimes it is necessary to update World Bank figures for fertility rates more than once for the same year.)

=== Governmental organizations ranking lists ===
The CIA ranking list is sourced from the CIA World Factbook for the most recent year unless otherwise specified. Sovereign states and countries are ranked. Some countries might not be listed because they are not fully recognized as countries at the time of this census.

The INED (Institut National d'Études Démographiques) list is based on the online publication Population & Sociétés - Tous les pays du monde (2019), number 569, September 2019.

=== Non-governmental organizations ranking lists ===
The Population Reference Bureau (PRB) ranking list is based on the data of the 2024 World Population Data Sheet published online. The PRB is a private, nonprofit organization which informs people around the world about population, health and the environment for research or academic purposes. It was founded in 1929. World Population Data Sheets are double-sided wallcharts (now published online) that present detailed information on demographic, health and environment indicators for more than 200 countries.

The Our World in Data (OWID) "Total fertility rate: births per woman, 2023" list is sourced and based on the OWID website which includes tables and maps.

=== Methodological challenges ===
Changes in figures of fertility rates by country from one year to another do not always reflect an actual increase or decrease of fertility rates in a certain country, but instead reflect a change made due to more accurate and updated information from sources.

Figures of fertility rates by country and their ranking are based on single referenced sources, from organizations that investigate demographic issues. In several instances, they do not correspond with other sources, such as other organizations and sources that are referenced in the individual demographics by country, which can be accessed by clicking on the names of the countries. These differences can be due to several factors, including primary sources, data quality, and methodology.

=== Replacement rates ===
Replacement fertility is the total fertility rate at which women give birth to enough babies to sustain population levels, assuming that mortality rates remain constant and net migration is zero. If replacement level fertility is sustained over a sufficiently long period, each generation will exactly replace itself. The replacement fertility rate is 2.1 births per female for most developed countries (in the United Kingdom, for example), but can be as high as 3.5 in undeveloped countries because of higher mortality rates, especially child mortality. The global average for the replacement total fertility rate, eventually leading to a stable global population, for the contemporary period, 2010–2015, is 2.3 children per female.

== Country ranking by most recent year ==
=== Country ranking by international organizations ===
2026 list by the United Nations
Rank	Country	Total fertility rate in 2026 (births/woman)
1	Chad	5.84
2	Somalia	5.81
3	DR Congo	5.80
4	Central African Republic	5.69
5	Niger	5.64
6	Mali	5.33
7	Angola	4.89
8	Burundi	4.57
9	Afghanistan	4.56
10	Mozambique	4.54
11	Mauritania	4.49
12 (1)	Mayotte (France)	4.43
13	Tanzania	4.41
14	Benin	4.34
15	Yemen	4.33
16	Nigeria	4.21
17	Sudan	4.13
18	Cameroon	4.12
19	Ivory Coast	4.10
20	Togo	4.01
21	Congo	3.99
22	Uganda	3.97
23	Equatorial Guinea	3.96
24	Guinea	3.96
25	Burkina Faso	3.92
26	Zambia	3.91
27	Madagascar	3.78
28	Ethiopia	3.72
29	Comoros	3.71
30	Liberia	3.71
31	Gambia	3.70
32	Samoa	3.70
33	Senegal	3.66
34	South Sudan	3.63
35	Guinea-Bissau	3.62
36	Zimbabwe	3.57
37	Eritrea	3.55
38	Rwanda	3.54
39	Sierra Leone	3.53
40	Vanuatu	3.50
41	Gabon	3.49
42	São Tomé and Príncipe	3.47
43	Malawi	3.45
44	Pakistan	3.44
45	Solomon Islands	3.42
46	Uzbekistan	3.40
47	Ghana	3.26
48 (2)	French Guiana (France)	3.25
49	Nauru	3.21
50	Iraq	3.13
51	Namibia	3.13
52	Palestine	3.13
53	Tuvalu	3.10
54	Kenya	3.07
55	Kiribati	3.06
56	Tonga	3.04
57	Papua New Guinea	2.99
58	Tajikistan	2.96
59	Kazakhstan	2.92
60	Marshall Islands	2.77
61	Israel	2.73
62	Kyrgyzstan	2.72
63	Egypt	2.68
64 (3)	Guam (US)	2.68
65	Federated States of Micronesia	2.67
66	Eswatini	2.64
67	Botswana	2.63
68	Algeria	2.62
69	Syria	2.62
70	Lesotho	2.61
71	Turkmenistan	2.60
72 (4)	Saint Martin (France)	2.59
73	Haiti	2.55
74	Djibouti	2.54
75	Jordan	2.54
76	Mongolia	2.54
77 (5)	Tokelau (NZ)	2.54
78	Timor-Leste	2.50
79	Cambodia	2.49
80	Bolivia	2.47
81	Niue	2.44
82	Oman	2.44
83	Honduras	2.42
84	Paraguay	2.37
85	Guyana	2.35
86	Laos	2.33
87	Saudi Arabia	2.27
88 (6)	Northern Mariana Islands (US)	2.24
89	Fiji	2.23
90	Guatemala	2.23
	World	2.23
91 (7)	American Samoa (US)	2.22
92	Libya	2.21
93 (8)	Faroe Islands (Denmark)	2.19
94	Lebanon	2.19
95	Suriname	2.19
96	Dominican Republic	2.17
97	South Africa	2.17
98	Morocco	2.16
99	Nicaragua	2.16
100	Western Sahara	2.13
101 (9)	Réunion (France)	2.12
102	Bangladesh	2.09
103	Monaco	2.09
104	Indonesia	2.08
105	Panama	2.07
106	Myanmar	2.06
107	Seychelles	2.06
108 (10)	U.S. Virgin Islands (US)	2.05
109 (11)	Guadeloupe (France)	2.04
110	Venezuela	2.04
111	Belize	1.99
112	Cook Islands	1.98
113 (12)	Martinique (France)	1.95
114	India	1.93
115 (13)	New Caledonia (France)	1.93
116	Peru	1.93
117	Sri Lanka	1.93
118	Nepal	1.92
119 (14)	Greenland (Denmark)	1.90
120 (15)	Gibraltar (UK)	1.88
121	Philippines	1.86
122	Vietnam	1.86
123	Mexico	1.85
124	Palau	1.84
125	Montenegro	1.79
126	Tunisia	1.79
127	Ecuador	1.78
128	Georgia	1.78
129	Bahrain	1.77
130	North Korea	1.75
131	Bulgaria	1.74
132	El Salvador	1.74
133	Saint Vincent and the Grenadines	1.73
134	Moldova	1.72
135	Armenia	1.71
136	Barbados	1.71
137	Romania	1.71
138	Brunei	1.70
139 (16)	Falkland Islands (UK)	1.69
140	Qatar	1.69
141	Azerbaijan	1.66
142	Iran	1.66
143	Australia	1.64
144	France	1.64
145	New Zealand	1.64
146 (17)	Saint Helena, Ascension and Tristan da Cunha (UK)	1.64
147	United States	1.63
148	Turkey	1.62
149 (18)	Aruba (Netherlands)	1.61
150	Colombia	1.61
151	Ireland	1.60
152	Brazil	1.59
153	Slovenia	1.58
154	Antigua and Barbuda	1.57
155	Slovakia	1.57
156	Liechtenstein	1.54
157 (19)	Isle of Man (UK)	1.53
158	Maldives	1.53
159	United Kingdom	1.53
160	Kosovo	1.52
161	Malaysia	1.52
162	Portugal	1.52
163	Trinidad and Tobago	1.52
164	Denmark	1.52
165	Argentina	1.51
166	Serbia	1.51
167	Bosnia and Herzegovina	1.50
168 (20)	Cayman Islands (UK)	1.50
169	Hungary	1.50
170	Saint Kitts and Nevis	1.50
171	Cape Verde	1.49
172	Iceland	1.49
173	Kuwait	1.49
174	Croatia	1.47
175	Czech Republic	1.47
176 (21)	French Polynesia (France)	1.47
177	North Macedonia	1.47
178	Russia	1.47
179	Cuba	1.46
180	Dominica	1.46
181	Germany	1.46
182	Grenada	1.45
183 (22)	Montserrat (UK)	1.45
184	Sweden	1.45
185	Switzerland	1.45
186 (23)	Caribbean Netherlands (Netherlands)	1.44
187	Netherlands	1.44
188	Bhutan	1.43
189 (24)	Turks and Caicos Islands (UK)	1.43
190 (25)	Bermuda (UK)	1.42
191	Norway	1.42
192 (26)	Sint Maarten (Netherlands)	1.42
193	Luxembourg	1.41
194	Belgium	1.40
195 (27)	Wallis and Futuna (France)	1.39
196	Estonia	1.38
197 (28)	Jersey (UK)	1.38
198	Uruguay	1.38
199	Cyprus	1.37
200 (39)	Guernsey (UK)	1.37
201	Saint Lucia	1.37
202	Bahamas	1.36
203	Latvia	1.35
204 (30)	Anguilla (UK)	1.34
205	Austria	1.34
206	Greece	1.34
207	Canada	1.33
208	Jamaica	1.33
209	Albania	1.32
210	Costa Rica	1.31
211	Poland	1.31
212	Finland	1.30
213 (31)	Saint Pierre and Miquelon (France)	1.29
214	Spain	1.24
215	Belarus	1.23
216	Japan	1.23
217	Italy	1.22
218	Lithuania	1.22
219	Mauritius	1.21
220	United Arab Emirates	1.21
221	Thailand	1.19
222	San Marino	1.17
223	Chile	1.12
224	Malta	1.12
225	Andorra	1.11
226 (32)	British Virgin Islands (UK)	1.07
227 (33)	Curaçao (Netherlands)	1.07
228	China	1.03
229	Ukraine	1.00
230	Vatican City	1.00
231	Singapore	0.87
232 (34)	Puerto Rico (US)	0.94
233	Taiwan	0.86
234 (35)	Saint Barthélemy (France)	0.84
235	South Korea	0.76
236 (36)	Hong Kong (China)	0.75
237 (37)	Macau (China)	0.70
	Sovereign states: 200	
	Dependent territories: 37	
	World	2.23
	Development Group	
1	Least developed countries	3.78
2	Less developed regions	2.34
2.1	Less developed regions, excluding China	2.59
2.2	Less developed regions, excluding least developed countries	2.00
3	More developed regions	1.47
	Income Group	
1	Low-income countries	4.30
2	Low-and-Lower-middle-income countries	2.81
3	Low-and-middle-income countries	2.33
4	Middle-income countries	2.08
4.1	Lower-middle-income countries	2.48
4.2	Upper-middle-income countries	1.48
5	No income group available	2.05
6	High-and-upper-middle-income countries	1.48
7	High-income countries	1.48
	Region	
1	Africa	3.89
1.1	Middle Africa	5.28
1.2	Western Africa	4.19
1.3	Eastern Africa	3.89
1.4	Northern Africa	2.85
1.5	Southern Africa	2.25
2	Oceania	2.12
2.1	Melanesia	2.95
2.2	Micronesia	2.76
2.3	Polynesia	2.48
2.4	Australia/New Zealand	1.64
3	Asia	1.87
3.1	Central Asia	3.10
3.2	Western Asia	2.50
3.3	Southern Asia	2.16
3.4	South-Eastern Asia	1.89
3.5	Eastern Asia	1.05
4	Latin America and the Caribbean	1.77
4.1	Caribbean	1.94
4.2	Central America	1.93
4.3	South America	1.68
5	Northern America	1.60
6	Europe	1.41
6.1	Western Europe	1.51
6.2	Northern Europe	1.50
6.3	Eastern Europe	1.40
6.4	Southern Europe	1.30
	SDG region	
1	Sub-Saharan Africa	4.11
2	Oceania (excluding Australia and New Zealand)	2.93
3	Northern Africa and Western Asia	2.66
4	Central and Southern Asia	2.20
5	Latin America and the Caribbean	1.77
6	Australia/New Zealand	1.64
7	Europe, Northern America, Australia, and New Zealand	1.49
8	Europe and Northern America	1.48
9	Eastern and South-Eastern Asia	1.35
	Special other	
1	Land-locked Developing Countries (LLDC)	3.68
1.1	LLDC: Africa	4.10
1.2	LLDC: Asia	3.00
1.3	LLDC: Latin America	2.43
1.4	LLDC: Europe	1.63
2	Small Island Developing States (SIDS)	2.14
2.1	SIDS Pacific	2.89
2.2	SIDS Caribbean	1.95
2.3	SIDS Atlantic, Indian Ocean and South China Sea (AIS)	1.86

2024 list by the World Bank
Rank	Country	Total fertility rate in 2024 (births/woman)
1	Chad	6.03
2	Somalia	6.01
3	DR Congo	5.98
4	Central African Republic	5.95
5	Niger	5.94
6	Mali	5.51
7	Angola	5.05
8	Burundi	4.79
9	Afghanistan	4.76
10	Mozambique	4.69
11	Mauritania	4.63
12	Tanzania	4.54
13	Yemen	4.50
14	Benin	4.48
15	Nigeria	4.38
16	Sudan	4.26
17	Cameroon	4.26
18	Ivory Coast	4.23
19	Uganda	4.17
20	Guinea	4.13
21	Equatorial Guinea	4.12
22	Togo	4.12
23	Burkina Faso	4.11
24	Congo	4.11
25	Zambia	4.04
26	Madagascar	3.91
27	Ethiopia	3.91
28	Gambia	3.91
29	Liberia	3.86
30	Comoros	3.82
31	Samoa	3.80
32	South Sudan	3.79
33	Senegal	3.77
34	Guinea-Bissau	3.76
35	Sierra Leone	3.70
36	Eritrea	3.68
37	Zimbabwe	3.67
38	Rwanda	3.65
39	São Tomé and Príncipe	3.60
40	Gabon	3.59
41	Malawi	3.59
42	Vanuatu	3.57
43	Pakistan	3.55
44	Solomon Islands	3.51
45	Uzbekistan	3.49
46	Ghana	3.34
47	Nauru	3.29
48	Palestine	3.25
49	Iraq	3.22
50	Namibia	3.21
51	Tuvalu	3.17
52	Kenya	3.17
53	Kiribati	3.12
54	Tonga	3.10
55	Papua New Guinea	3.07
56	Tajikistan	3.04
57	Kazakhstan	2.98
58	Israel	2.87
59	Marshall Islands	2.86
60 (1)	Guam (US)	2.75
61	Federated States of Micronesia	2.74
62	Egypt	2.74
63	Algeria	2.72
64	Eswatini	2.72
65	Botswana	2.70
66	Syria	2.70
67 (2)	Saint Martin (France)	2.67
68	Lesotho	2.66
69	Turkmenistan	2.66
70	Timor-Leste	2.63
71	Haiti	2.63
72	Djibouti	2.62
73	Kyrgyzstan	2.60
74	Jordan	2.60
75	Cambodia	2.55
76	Bolivia	2.52
77	Oman	2.51
78	Honduras	2.48
79	Paraguay	2.42
80	Laos	2.40
81	Guyana	2.40
82 (3)	Northern Mariana Islands (US)	2.32
83	Saudi Arabia	2.31
84	Libya	2.30
85	Guatemala	2.29
86 (4)	American Samoa (US)	2.27
87	Fiji	2.27
88	Suriname	2.23
89	Lebanon	2.23
90	Dominican Republic	2.22
91	Morocco	2.21
92	Nicaragua	2.21
93	South Africa	2.21
	World	2.19
94	Bangladesh	2.14
95	Indonesia	2.12
96	Panama	2.11
97	Myanmar	2.10
98	Monaco	2.10
99	Venezuela	2.08
100	Belize	2.02
101	Peru	1.97
102 (5)	U.S. Virgin Islands (US)	1.97
103	India	1.96
104	Nepal	1.96
105 (6)	New Caledonia (France)	1.96
106	Sri Lanka	1.95
107 (7)	Faroe Islands (Denmark)	1.91
108	Vietnam	1.90
109	Philippines	1.89
110	Mexico	1.89
111 (8)	Gibraltar (UK)	1.89
112	Palau	1.88
113	Seychelles	1.85
114	Tunisia	1.82
115	Bahrain	1.81
116	Ecuador	1.81
117	Georgia	1.80
118	Montenegro	1.80
119	North Korea	1.78
120	El Salvador	1.77
121	Saint Vincent and the Grenadines	1.76
122	Brunei	1.73
123	Moldova	1.73
124	Qatar	1.72
125	Bulgaria	1.72
126	Barbados	1.71
127 (9)	Greenland (Denmark)	1.71
128	Armenia	1.70
129	Iran	1.68
130	Serbia	1.64
131	Colombia	1.63
132	United States	1.63
133	Brazil	1.61
134	France	1.61
135 (10)	Aruba (Netherlands)	1.61
136	Antigua and Barbuda	1.58
137	New Zealand	1.57
138	Iceland	1.56
139	Maldives	1.56
140	Kuwait	1.56
141	United Kingdom	1.55
142 (11)	Isle of Man (UK)	1.54
143	Malaysia	1.54
144	Kosovo	1.54
145	Trinidad and Tobago	1.54
146 (12)	Cayman Islands (UK)	1.53
147	Saint Kitts and Nevis	1.53
148	Slovenia	1.52
149	Cape Verde	1.51
150	Argentina	1.50
151 (13)	French Polynesia (France)	1.49
152	Bosnia and Herzegovina	1.49
153	Australia	1.48
154	Dominica	1.48
155	Turkey	1.48
156	Ireland	1.47
157	Denmark	1.47
158	Grenada	1.47
159	Slovakia	1.46
160	Croatia	1.46
161 (14)	Turks and Caicos Islands (UK)	1.45
162	Bhutan	1.45
163	Norway	1.45
164	Cuba	1.45
165	Belgium	1.44
166 (15)	Sint Maarten (Netherlands)	1.44
167	Mauritius	1.44
168	Azerbaijan	1.43
169	Sweden	1.43
170	Netherlands	1.43
171	Russia	1.42
172	Hungary	1.41
173	Portugal	1.41
174 (16)	Bermuda (UK)	1.41
175	North Macedonia	1.40
176	Uruguay	1.40
177 (17)	Curaçao (Netherlands)	1.40
178	Romania	1.39
179	Saint Lucia	1.39
180	Cyprus	1.38
181 (18)	Guernsey (UK)	1.37
182 (19)	Jersey (UK)	1.37
183	Liechtenstein	1.37
184	Bahamas	1.37
185	Czech Republic	1.36
186	Germany	1.36
187	Jamaica	1.35
188	Albania	1.34
189	Costa Rica	1.32
190	Austria	1.31
191	Switzerland	1.29
192	Canada	1.25
193	Finland	1.25
194	Luxembourg	1.25
195	Latvia	1.24
196	Greece	1.24
197	Belarus	1.22
198	United Arab Emirates	1.21
199	Thailand	1.20
200	Estonia	1.18
201	Italy	1.18
202	San Marino	1.16
203	Japan	1.15
204	Chile	1.14
205	Poland	1.14
206	Lithuania	1.11
207	Spain	1.10
208	Andorra	1.09
209 (20)	British Virgin Islands (UK)	1.05
210	China	1.01
211	Malta	1.01
212	Ukraine	0.99
213	Singapore	0.97
214 (21)	Puerto Rico (US)	0.92
215 (22)	Hong Kong (China)	0.84
216	South Korea	0.75
217 (23)	Macau (China)	0.58
	Sovereign states: 194	
	Dependent territories: 23	
	World	2.19
	Major regions	
1	Sub-Saharan Africa	4.26
2	Middle East and North Africa	2.98
3	South Asia	1.98
4	Latin America and the Caribbean	1.79
5	North America	1.59
6	Europe and Central Asia	1.55
7	East Asia and Pacific	1.34
	Income	
1	Low income countries	4.58
2	Lower middle income countries	2.56
3	Low and middle income countries	2.30
4	Middle income countries	2.07
5	Upper middle income countries	1.48
6	High income countries	1.42
	International organizations	
1	OECD members	1.48
2	European Union	1.34

=== Country ranking by governmental organizations ===
2022 list by the INED (Institut National d'Études Démographiques) (Note: (-): Data unavailable, inapplicable, not collected, or country or dependent territory not included. Sovereign states and dependent territories listed by alphabetical order, not ranked.)
Rank	Country	Fertility rate in 2022 (births/woman)
1	Niger	6.7
2	Chad	6.2
3	Somalia	6.2
4	DR Congo	6.1
5	Central African Republic	5.9
6	Mali	5.9
7	Angola	5.2
8	Nigeria	5.1
9	Burundi	5.0
10	Benin	4.9
11	Burkina Faso	4.7
12	Tanzania	4.7
13	Gambia	4.6
14	Mozambique	4.6
15	Afghanistan	4.5
16	Uganda	4.5
17	Cameroon	4.4
18 (1)	Mayotte (France)	4.4
19	Sudan	4.4
20	Ivory Coast	4.3
21	Guinea	4.3
22	Mauritania	4.3
23	Senegal	4.3
24	South Sudan	4.3
25	Equatorial Guinea	4.2
26	Togo	4.2
27	Zambia	4.2
28	Congo	4.1
29	Ethiopia	4.1
30	Liberia	4.0
31	Comoros	3.9
32	Guinea-Bissau	3.9
33	Samoa	3.9
34	Sierra Leone	3.9
35	Solomon Islands	3.9
36	Eritrea	3.8
37	Madagascar	3.8
38	Malawi	3.8
39	São Tomé and Príncipe	3.8
40	Rwanda	3.7
41	Vanuatu	3.7
42	Yemen	3.7
43	Gabon	3.5
44	Ghana	3.5
45 (2)	French Guiana (France)	3.5
46	Iraq	3.4
47	Pakistan	3.4
48	Palestine (Gaza Strip and West Bank)	3.4
49	Zimbabwe	3.4
50	Kenya	3.3
51	Kiribati	3.3
52	Namibia	3.2
53	Papua New Guinea	3.2
54	Tonga	3.2
55	Tajikistan	3.1
56	Kazakhstan	3.0
57	Lesotho	3.0
58	Timor-Leste	3.0
59	Egypt	2.9
60	Israel	2.9
61	Kyrgyzstan	2.9
62	Algeria	2.8
63	Botswana	2.8
64	Djibouti	2.8
65	Eswatini	2.8
66	Haiti	2.8
67	Jordan	2.8
68	Mongolia	2.8
69	Uzbekistan	2.8
70	Marshall Islands	2.7
71	Federated States of Micronesia	2.7
72	Philippines	2.7
73	Syria	2.7
74	Bolivia	2.6
75 (3)	Guam (US)	2.6
76	Oman	2.6
77	Turkmenistan	2.6
78	Fiji	2.5
79	Guatemala	2.4
80	Guyana	2.4
81	Laos	2.4
82	Libya	2.4
83	Paraguay	2.4
84	Saudi Arabia	2.4
85	Cambodia	2.3
86	Honduras	2.3
87	Morocco	2.3
88	Nicaragua	2.3
89	Panama	2.3
90	Seychelles	2.3
91	South Africa	2.3
92	Suriname	2.3
93	Western Sahara	2.3
	World	2.3
	Population replacement	2.3
94	Dominican Republic	2.2
95	Indonesia	2.2
96	Peru	2.2
97 (4)	Réunion (France)	2.2
98	Venezuela	2.2
99	Georgia	2.1
100	Kuwait	2.1
101	Lebanon	2.1
102	Monaco	2.1
103	Myanmar	2.1
104	Tunisia	2.1
105 (5)	U.S. Virgin Islands (US)	2.1
106	Bangladesh	2.0
107	Belize	2.0
108	Ecuador	2.0
109	Grenada	2.0
110 (6)	Guadeloupe (France)	2.0
111	India	2.0
112	Nepal	2.0
113 (7)	New Caledonia (France)	2.0
114	Sri Lanka	2.0
115	Argentina	1.9
116	Cape Verde	1.9
117 (8)	Martinique (France)	1.9
118	Turkey	1.9
119	Vietnam	1.9
120	Bahrain	1.8
121	Brunei	1.8
122	El Salvador	1.8
123	France (Metropolitan France)	1.8
124	Ireland	1.8
125	Malaysia	1.8
126	Mexico	1.8
127	Moldova	1.8
128	New Zealand	1.8
129	North Korea	1.8
130	Qatar	1.8
131	Saint Vincent and the Grenadines	1.8
132	Azerbaijan	1.7
133	Colombia	1.7
134	Czech Republic	1.7
135	Denmark	1.7
136	Estonia	1.7
137	Iceland	1.7
138	Iran	1.7
139	Maldives	1.7
140	Montenegro	1.7
141 (9)	French Polynesia (France)	1.7
142	Romania	1.7
143	Sweden	1.7
144	United States	1.7
145	Antigua and Barbuda	1.6
146	Armenia	1.6
147	Australia	1.6
148	Barbados	1.6
149	Belgium	1.6
150	Brazil	1.6
151	Bulgaria	1.6
152 (10)	Curaçao (Netherlands)	1.6
153	Dominica	1.6
154	Hungary	1.6
155	Netherlands	1.6
156	Latvia	1.6
157	Lithuania	1.6
158	Slovakia	1.6
159	Slovenia	1.6
160	Trinidad and Tobago	1.6
161	United Kingdom	1.6
162	Austria	1.5
163	Belarus	1.5
164	Canada	1.5
165	Chile	1.5
166	Costa Rica	1.5
167	Germany	1.5
168	Kosovo	1.5
169	Liechtenstein	1.5
170	Norway	1.5
171	Poland	1.5
172	Russia	1.5
173	Saint Kitts and Nevis	1.5
174	Serbia	1.5
175	Switzerland	1.5
176	Uruguay	1.5
177	Albania	1.4
178	Bahamas	1.4
179	Bhutan	1.4
180	Croatia	1.4
181	Cuba	1.4
182	Finland	1.4
183	Greece	1.4
184	Luxembourg	1.4
185	Mauritius	1.4
186	North Macedonia	1.4
187	Portugal	1.4
188	Saint Lucia	1.4
189	United Arab Emirates	1.4
190	Bosnia and Herzegovina	1.3
191	Cyprus	1.3
192	Italy	1.3
193	Jamaica	1.3
194	Japan	1.3
195 (11)	Puerto Rico (US)	1.3
196	Spain	1.3
197	Thailand	1.3
198	Ukraine	1.3
199 (12)	Aruba (Netherlands)	1.2
200	China (mainland only)	1.2
201	Malta	1.2
202	Andorra	1.1
203	Taiwan (Taiwan)	1.1
204 (13)	Macau (China)	1.1
205	San Marino	1.1
206	Singapore	1.0
207	South Korea	0.9
208 (14)	Hong Kong (China)	0.8
	Sovereign states: 194	
	Dependent territories: 14	
	World	
1	World	2.3
	Continents	
1	Africa	4.2
2	Oceania	2.1
3	Asia	1.9
4	Americas	1.8
5	Europe	1.5
	Major regions	
1	Middle Africa	5.6
2	Western Africa	4.9
3	Eastern Africa	4.2
4	Northern Africa	3.0
5	Central Asia	2.9
6	Western Asia	2.6
7	Southern Africa	2.4
8	South Asia	2.2
9	Oceania	2.1
10	Southeast Asia	2.1
11	Caribbean	2.0
12	Central America	1.9
13	Latin America and the Caribbean	1.8
14	South America	1.8
15	Northern America	1.6
16	Northern Europe	1.6
17	Western Europe	1.6
18	Eastern Europe	1.5
19	Southern Europe	1.3
20	East Asia	1.2
	Not ranked	
1	Channel Islands - (1) Guernsey (UK) and (2) Jersey (UK)	-
2 (3)	Christmas Island (Australia)	-
3 (4)	Cocos (Keeling) Islands (Australia)	-
4	European Union	-
5 (5)	Falkland Islands (UK)	-
6 (6)	Faroe Islands (Denmark)	-
7	Nauru	-
8	Niue	-
9 (7)	Norfolk Island (Australia)	-
10	Palau	-
11 (8)	Pitcairn Islands (UK)	-
12 (9)	Svalbard (Norway)	-
13 (10)	Tokelau (New Zealand)	-
14	Tuvalu	-
15	Vatican City	-
	Sovereign states: 4	
	Dependent territories: 10	

2025 list by the CIA World Factbook
Rank	Country	Fertility rate in 2025 (births/woman)
1	Niger	6.55
2	Somalia	6.38
3	Angola	5.45
4	DR Congo	5.42
5	Benin	5.30
6	Mali	5.26
7	Chad	5.13
8	Uganda	5.08
9	South Sudan	4.98
10	Burundi	4.94
11	Afghanistan	4.89
12	Mauritania	4.76
13	Guinea	4.75
14	Guinea-Bissau	4.59
15	Nigeria	4.59
16	Mozambique	4.58
17	Tanzania	4.45
18	Sudan	4.41
19	Equatorial Guinea	4.05
20	Togo	4.03
21	Burkina Faso	4.02
22	Senegal	3.96
23	Central African Republic	3.89
24	Cameroon	3.87
25	Ivory Coast	3.85
26	Liberia	3.84
27	Ethiopia	3.77
28	Papua New Guinea	3.72
29	Congo	3.72
30	Zambia	3.67
31	Yemen	3.65
32	Tajikistan	3.52
33	Sierra Leone	3.52
34	Ghana	3.51
35	Madagascar	3.47
36	West Bank (Palestine)	3.44
37	Zimbabwe	3.42
38	Gambia	3.39
39	Eritrea	3.35
40	Malawi	3.33
41	Pakistan	3.25
42	Rwanda	3.20
43	São Tomé and Príncipe	3.18
44	Gabon	3.16
45	Gaza Strip (Palestine)	3.14
46	Kenya	3.09
47	Iraq	3.03
48	Libya	2.96
49	Algeria	2.91
50	Israel	2.89
51	Namibia	2.85
52	Jordan	2.83
53	Timor-Leste	2.79
54	Tuvalu	2.76
55	Botswana	2.73
56	Solomon Islands	2.72
57 (1)	Guam (US)	2.70
58	Syria	2.64
59	Eswatini	2.64
60	Marshall Islands	2.62
61	Oman	2.61
62	Mongolia	2.60
63	Uzbekistan	2.60
64	Tonga	2.59
65	Kazakhstan	2.57
66	Egypt	2.53
67 (2)	Northern Mariana Islands (US)	2.53
68	Nauru	2.52
69	Comoros	2.52
70	Lesotho	2.49
71	Vanuatu	2.46
72	Kyrgyzstan	2.43
	World	2.42 (2020 est.)
73	Haiti	2.39
74	Panama	2.33
75	Honduras	2.29
76	Samoa	2.29
77 (3)	Faroe Islands (Denmark)	2.26
78	Bangladesh	2.25
79	Morocco	2.24
80	South Africa	2.23
81	Lebanon	2.20
82	Laos	2.19
83	Kuwait	2.19
84	Fiji	2.18
85	Federated States of Micronesia	2.17
86	Dominican Republic	2.17
87	Ecuador	2.17
88	Venezuela	2.16
89	Cambodia	2.14
90	Kiribati	2.13
91	Bolivia	2.13
92	Peru	2.12
93	Sri Lanka	2.12
94	Djibouti	2.09
95	Cape Verde	2.08
96	Guyana	2.04
97	Turkmenistan	2.02
98	Belize	2.02
99	Vietnam	2.01
100	Dominica	2.01
101	India	2.00
102	Cook Islands (self-governing country in free association with New Zealand)	1.99
103 (4)	American Samoa (US)	1.99
104	Guatemala	1.97
105 (5)	Sint Maarten (Netherlands)	1.96
106 (6)	Curaçao (Netherlands)	1.95
107 (7)	U.S. Virgin Islands (US)	1.95
108	Myanmar	1.95
109	Philippines	1.94
110	Georgia	1.94
111	Colombia	1.94
112	Iceland	1.93
113	Indonesia	1.93
114	Antigua and Barbuda	1.92
115	Qatar	1.90
116	France	1.90
117	Grenada	1.89
118 (8)	Bermuda (UK)	1.88
119	Paraguay	1.88
120	Turkey	1.88
121 (9)	Gibraltar (UK)	1.88
122	Suriname	1.87
123 (10)	Greenland (Denmark)	1.87
124 (11)	Isle of Man (UK)	1.87
125	Jamaica	1.86
126	Kosovo	1.85
127	Mexico	1.85
128	New Zealand	1.84
129	Saudi Arabia	1.84
130 (12)	Aruba (Netherlands)	1.82
131	Nicaragua	1.82
132 (13)	New Caledonia (France)	1.82
133	Nepal	1.82
134 (14)	Cayman Islands (UK)	1.81
135	North Korea	1.80
136	Seychelles	1.80
137 (15)	Saint Martin (France)	1.80
138	Montenegro	1.80
139 (16)	French Polynesia (France)	1.78
140	Saint Kitts and Nevis	1.76
141	Bhutan	1.75
142	Brunei	1.73
143	Czech Republic	1.73
144	Brazil	1.73
145	Malaysia	1.73
146	Saint Vincent and the Grenadines	1.73
147 (17)	Anguilla (UK)	1.72
148	Ireland	1.72
149 (18)	Wallis and Futuna (France)	1.71
150	Saint Lucia	1.71
151 (19)	Turks and Caicos Islands (UK)	1.70
152	Maldives	1.70
153	Palau	1.70
154	Azerbaijan	1.69
155	Liechtenstein	1.69
156 (20)	Jersey (UK)	1.66
157	Sweden	1.66
158	Armenia	1.66
159	Bahrain	1.64
160 (21)	Saint Barthélemy (France)	1.64
161	United Kingdom	1.64
162	United States	1.63
163	Trinidad and Tobago	1.63
164	Romania	1.63
165	Netherlands	1.62
166 (22)	Saint Helena, Ascension and Tristan da Cunha (UK)	1.61
167 (23)	Saint Pierre and Miquelon (France)	1.60
168	United Arab Emirates	1.60
169	Slovakia	1.60
170	Hungary	1.60
171	Switzerland	1.59
172	Tunisia	1.59
173	Germany	1.59
174 (24)	Guernsey (UK)	1.59
175	Norway	1.58
176	Monaco	1.55
177	Thailand	1.55
178	San Marino	1.54
179	North Macedonia	1.53
180	Iran	1.53
181	Russia	1.52
182	Bulgaria	1.52
183	Australia	1.50
184	Denmark	1.50
185	Cyprus	1.49
186	Cuba	1.49
187	Slovenia	1.49
188	Serbia	1.47
189	Andorra	1.47
190	Belgium	1.46
191	Portugal	1.46
192	Costa Rica	1.45
193	Belarus	1.45
194	Bahamas	1.45
195	Argentina	1.43
196	Croatia	1.43
197	Canada	1.43
198	Greece	1.42
199	Japan	1.41
200	El Salvador	1.40
201 (25)	British Virgin Islands (UK)	1.39
202	Estonia	1.36
203	Mauritius	1.36
204	Austria	1.35
205 (26)	Montserrat (UK)	1.34
206	Poland	1.33
207	Spain	1.32
208	Finland	1.28
209	Italy	1.27
210 (27)	Puerto Rico (US)	1.27
211	Moldova	1.27
212	Uruguay	1.27
213 (28)	Macau (China)	1.25
214	Latvia	1.25
215	Chile	1.25
216	Luxembourg	1.25
217	Barbados	1.24
218 (29)	Hong Kong (China)	1.24
219	Ukraine	1.22
220	Lithuania	1.22
221	China	1.20
222	Malta	1.18
223	Singapore	1.18
224	Bosnia and Herzegovina	1.15
225	Taiwan (Taiwan)	1.12
226	Albania	1.09
227	South Korea	0.68
	Sovereign states: 198	
	Dependent territories: 29	

=== Country ranking by non-governmental organizations ===
2026 list by the PRB (Population Reference Bureau)
Rank	Country	Fertility rate in 2026 (births/woman)
1	Somalia	6.4
2	Central African Republic	6.1
3	Mali	6.0
4	Chad	5.9
5	Niger	5.8
6	DR Congo	5.5
7	Afghanistan	4.9
8	Burundi	4.9
9	Mozambique	4.9
10	Angola	4.8
11	Mauritania	4.8
12	Nigeria	4.8
13	Benin	4.7
14	Tanzania	4.5
15	Uganda	4.5
16	Guinea	4.4
17	Senegal	4.4
18	Sudan	4.2
19	Burkina Faso	4.0
20	Comoros	4.0
21	Equatorial Guinea	4.0
22	Ethiopia	4.0
23	Togo	4.0
24	Zambia	4.0
25	Congo	3.9
26	Cameroon	3.9
27	Ivory Coast	3.9
28	Eritrea	3.9
29	Ghana	3.9
30	Iraq	3.9
31	Liberia	3.9
32	São Tomé and Príncipe	3.9
33	Zimbabwe	3.9
34	Gambia	3.8
35	Samoa	3.8
36	Solomon Islands	3.8
37	Guinea-Bissau	3.7
38	Kyrgyzstan	3.7
39	Malawi	3.7
40	Rwanda	3.7
41	South Sudan	3.7
42	Yemen	3.7
43	Sierra Leone	3.6
44	Vanuatu	3.6
45	Gabon	3.5
46	Madagascar	3.5
47 (1)	Mayotte (France)	3.5
48	Pakistan	3.5
49	Tajikistan	3.5
50	Timor-Leste	3.4
51	Kiribati	3.3
52	Nauru	3.3
53	Namibia	3.2
54	Uzbekistan	3.2
55 (2)	French Guiana (France)	3.1
56	Kenya	3.1
57	Tonga	3.1
58	Tuvalu	3.1
59	Libya	3.0
60	Papua New Guinea	3.0
61	Algeria	2.9
62	Israel	2.9
63	Palestine (Gaza Strip and West Bank)	2.9
64	Turkmenistan	2.8
65	Botswana	2.7
66	Federated States of Micronesia	2.7
67	Syria	2.7
68	Djibouti	2.6
69	Jordan	2.6
70	Kazakhstan	2.6
71	Eswatini	2.6
72	Cambodia	2.5
73	Fiji	2.5
74	Laos	2.5
75	Lesotho	2.5
76	Egypt	2.4
77	Guyana	2.4
78	Mongolia	2.4
79	Suriname	2.4
80	Bangladesh	2.3
81	Guatemala	2.3
82	Haiti	2.3
83	Honduras	2.3
84	Saudi Arabia	2.3
	Population Replacement	2.3
85	Lebanon	2.2
86	Morocco	2.2
87	Nicaragua	2.2
88	Western Sahara	2.2
	World	2.2
89	Belize	2.1
90	Dominican Republic	2.1
91 (3)	Guadeloupe (France)	2.1
92 (4)	Guam (US)	2.1
93	Indonesia	2.1
94	Monaco	2.1
95 (5)	Réunion (France)	2.1
96	South Africa	2.1
97	Venezuela	2.1
98	India	2.0
99 (6)	New Caledonia (France)	2.0
100	Jamaica	1.9
101	Kosovo	1.9
102	Nepal	1.9
103	Oman	1.9
104	Paraguay	1.9
105	Vietnam	1.9
106	Bahrain	1.8
107	Ecuador	1.8
108	Montenegro	1.8
109	Myanmar	1.8
110	North Korea	1.8
111	Panama	1.8
112	Armenia	1.7
113	Cape Verde	1.7
114 (7)	French Polynesia (France)	1.7
115	Moldova	1.7
116	Peru	1.7
117	Philippines	1.7
118	Qatar	1.7
119	Seychelles	1.7
120	Albania	1.6
121	Antigua and Barbuda	1.6
122	Bolivia	1.6
123	Bulgaria	1.6
124	France	1.6
125	Iceland	1.6
126	Kuwait	1.6
127	Malaysia	1.6
128 (8)	Martinique (France)	1.6
129	Mexico	1.6
130	New Zealand	1.6
131	Palau	1.6
132	Serbia	1.6
133	Tunisia	1.6
134	United States	1.6
135	Australia	1.5
136	Bahamas	1.5
137	Belarus	1.5
138	Brazil	1.5
139	Brunei	1.5
140	Croatia	1.5
141	Cuba	1.5
142	Denmark	1.5
143	Dominica	1.5
144	Georgia	1.5
145	Grenada	1.5
146	Iran	1.5
147	Ireland	1.5
148	Maldives	1.5
149	Norway	1.5
150	Saint Vincent and the Grenadines	1.5
151	Slovenia	1.5
152	Trinidad and Tobago	1.5
153	Argentina	1.4
154	Azerbaijan	1.4
155	Belgium	1.4
156	Bhutan	1.4
157	Channel Islands – (9) Guernsey (UK) and (10) Jersey (UK)	1.4
158	Cyprus	1.4
159	El Salvador	1.4
160	Liechtenstein	1.4
161	Mauritius	1.4
162	Netherlands	1.4
163	North Macedonia	1.4
164	Portugal	1.4
165	Russia	1.4
166	Romania	1.4
167	Saint Lucia	1.4
168	Slovakia	1.4
169	Sweden	1.4
170	Turkey	1.4
171	United Kingdom	1.4
172	Austria	1.3
173	Canada	1.3
174	Czech Republic	1.3
-	European Union	1.3
175	Finland	1.3
176	Germany	1.3
177	Greece	1.3
178	Hungary	1.3
179	Saint Kitts and Nevis	1.3
180	Sri Lanka	1.3
181	Switzerland	1.3
182	Uruguay	1.3
183	Barbados	1.2
184	Bosnia and Herzegovina	1.2
185 (11)	Curaçao (Netherlands)	1.2
186	Estonia	1.2
187	Latvia	1.2
188	Luxembourg	1.2
189	United Arab Emirates	1.2
190	Costa Rica	1.1
191	Italy	1.1
192	Japan	1.1
193	Poland	1.1
194	Spain	1.1
195	Ukraine	1.1
196	Colombia	1.0
197	Chile	1.0
198	Malta	1.0
199	Lithuania	1.0
200	Thailand	1.0
201	China (mainland only)	0.9
202 (12)	Puerto Rico (US)	0.9
203	San Marino	0.9
204	Singapore	0.9
205	Andorra	0.8
206	South Korea	0.8
207 (13)	Hong Kong (China)	0.7
208	Taiwan	0.7
209 (14)	Macau (China)	0.6
	Sovereign States: 195	
	Dependent Territories: 14	
1	World	2.2
	Continents	
1	Africa	4.0
2	Oceania	2.0
3	Asia	1.8
4	Americas	1.6
5	Europe	1.3
	Continental Major Regions	
1	Africa	4.0
1.1	Sub-Saharan Africa	4.3
1.1.2	Middle Africa	5.1
1.1.3	Western Africa	4.6
1.1.4	Eastern Africa	4.1
1.1.5	Southern Africa	2.2
1.2	Northern Africa	2.8
2	Oceania	2.0
3	Asia	1.8
3.1	Central Asia	3.1
3.2	Western Asia	2.4
3.3	South Asia	2.2
3.4	Southeast Asia	1.9
3.5	East Asia	0.9
4	Americas	1.6
4.1	Latin America and the Caribbean	1.6
4.1.1	Caribbean	1.9
4.1.2	Central America	1.7
4.1.3	South America	1.5
4.2	Northern America	1.5
5	Europe	1.3
5.1	Northern Europe	1.4
5.2	Western Europe	1.4
5.3	Eastern Europe	1.3
5.4	Southern Europe	1.2
	Development Level	
1	Least Developed	3.9
2	Less Developed	2.3
3	More Developed	1.4
	Income	
1	Low Income	4.4
2	Middle Income	2.0
2.1	Lower Middle Income	2.7
2.2	Upper Middle Income	1.4
3	High Income	1.4
	Not Ranked	
1 (1)	Christmas Island (Australia)	-
2 (2)	Cocos (Keeling) Islands (Australia)	-
3 (3)	Falkland Islands (UK)	-
4 (4)	Faroe Islands (Denmark)	-
5	Niue	-
6 (5)	Norfolk Island (Australia)	-
7 (6)	Pitcairn Islands (UK)	-
8 (7)	Svalbard (Norway)	-
9 (8)	Tokelau (New Zealand)	-
10	Vatican City	-
	Sovereign States: 2	
	Dependent Territories: 8	

2023 list by the OWID (Our World In Data) – based on Gapminder estimates
Rank	Country	Fertility rate in 2023 (births/woman)
1	Somalia	6.13
2	Chad	6.12
3	Niger	6.06
4	DR Congo	6.05
5	Central African Republic	6.01
6	Mali	5.61
7	Angola	5.12
8	Burundi	4.88
9	Afghanistan	4.84
10	Mozambique	4.76
11	Mauritania	4.70
12	Tanzania	4.61
13	Yemen	4.59
14	Benin	4.56
15	Nigeria	4.46
16	Sudan	4.32
17	Cameroon	4.32
18	Ivory Coast	4.28
19	Uganda	4.28
20	Guinea	4.22
21	Togo	4.19
22	Burkina Faso	4.19
23	Congo	4.16
24	Zambia	4.10
25	Equatorial Guinea	4.08
26	Gambia	4.01
27	Ethiopia	3.99
28	Madagascar	3.97
29	Liberia	3.95
30	Comoros	3.88
31	South Sudan	3.86
32	Guinea-Bissau	3.84
33	Samoa	3.83
34	Senegal	3.82
35	Sierra Leone	3.79
36	Zimbabwe	3.72
37	Eritrea	3.71
38	Rwanda	3.70
39	Malawi	3.65
40	Gabon	3.65
41	São Tomé and Príncipe	3.64
42	Pakistan	3.60
43	Vanuatu	3.60
44	Solomon Islands	3.56
45	Uzbekistan	3.50
46	Ghana	3.40
47 (1)	French Guiana (France)	3.39
48	Nauru	3.33
49	Palestine (Gaza Strip and West Bank)	3.31
50	Iraq	3.25
51	Namibia	3.21
52	Kenya	3.21
53	Tuvalu	3.21
54	Kiribati	3.15
55	Tonga	3.13
56	Papua New Guinea	3.10
57	Tajikistan	3.07
58	Kazakhstan	3.01
59	Marshall Islands	2.92
60	Israel	2.83
61	Kyrgyzstan	2.80
62 (2)	Guam (US)	2.78
63	Algeria	2.77
64	Eswatini	2.75
65	Egypt	2.75
66	Federated States of Micronesia	2.75
67	Botswana	2.73
68	Syria	2.71
69	Timor-Leste	2.71
70	Lesotho	2.69
71	Turkmenistan	2.69
72	Mongolia	2.69
73	Haiti	2.66
74	Jordan	2.64
75	Djibouti	2.61
76	Cambodia	2.58
77	Bolivia	2.55
78	Oman	2.52
79	Niue (self-governing state in free association with New Zealand)	2.51
80	Honduras	2.50
81	Paraguay	2.42
82	Laos	2.42
83	Guyana	2.41
84	Libya	2.35
85 (3)	Northern Mariana Islands (US)	2.35
86	Guatemala	2.31
	Population replacement	2.30
87 (4)	American Samoa (US)	2.29
88	Fiji	2.28
89	Saudi Arabia	2.28
90	Suriname	2.25
	World	2.25
91	Dominican Republic	2.24
92 (5)	Faroe Islands (Denmark)	2.24
93	Lebanon	2.24
94	Morocco	2.23
95	Nicaragua	2.22
96	South Africa	2.22
97 (6)	Réunion (France)	2.17
98 (...1...)	Western Sahara (disputed territory between Morocco and the Sahrawi Arab Democratic Republic) ("Free Zone" is a self proclaimed and de facto sovereign state)	2.16
99	Bangladesh	2.16
100	Seychelles	2.13
101	Indonesia	2.13
102	Panama	2.12
103	Myanmar	2.12
104	Monaco	2.11
105 (7)	U.S. Virgin Islands (US)	2.09
106 (8)	Guadeloupe (France)	2.09
107	Venezuela	2.08
108	Cook Islands (self-governing country in free association with New Zealand)	2.04
109 (9)	Martinique (France)	2.01
110	Belize	2.01
111	Nepal	1.98
112 (10)	New Caledonia (France)	1.98
113	Peru	1.98
114	India	1.98
115	Sri Lanka	1.97
116 (11)	Greenland (Denmark)	1.95
117	Philippines	1.92
118	Vietnam	1.91
119	Mexico	1.91
120	Palau	1.91
121 (12)	Gibraltar (UK)	1.89
122	Tunisia	1.83
123	Bahrain	1.82
124	Ecuador	1.82
125	Georgia	1.81
126	Montenegro	1.80
127	North Korea	1.78
128	El Salvador	1.77
129	Saint Vincent and the Grenadines	1.77
130	Bulgaria	1.75
131	Brunei	1.75
132	Moldova	1.73
133	Qatar	1.73
134	Armenia	1.71
135	Romania	1.71
136	Barbados	1.71
137	Iran	1.70
138 (13)	Falkland Islands (UK)	1.69
139	Azerbaijan	1.67
140	New Zealand	1.67
141	Colombia	1.65
142	France	1.64
143	Australia	1.64
144 (14)	Saint Helena, Ascension and Tristan da Cunha (UK)	1.64
145	Turkey	1.63
146	United States	1.62
147	Brazil	1.62
148 (15)	Aruba (Netherlands)	1.60
149	Ireland	1.60
150	Antigua and Barbuda	1.58
151	Slovenia	1.58
152	Maldives	1.57
153	Slovakia	1.56
154	United Kingdom	1.56
155	Malaysia	1.55
156 (16)	Isle of Man (UK)	1.55
157	Kosovo	1.54
158	Iceland	1.54
159	Liechtenstein	1.54
160	Trinidad and Tobago	1.53
161 (17)	Cayman Islands (UK)	1.53
162	Kuwait	1.52
163	Cape Verde	1.52
164	Denmark	1.51
165	Portugal	1.51
166	Saint Kitts and Nevis	1.50
167 (18)	French Polynesia (France)	1.50
168	Argentina	1.50
169	Serbia	1.50
170	Grenada	1.49
171	Bosnia and Herzegovina	1.49
172	Hungary	1.49
173	Dominica	1.48
174 (19)	Bonaire, Sint Eustatius and Saba (Netherlands)	1.47
175	Croatia	1.47
176	North Macedonia	1.47
177 (20)	Turks and Caicos Islands (UK)	1.46
178	Bhutan	1.46
179	Russia	1.45
180	Czech Republic	1.45
181 (21)	Sint Maarten (Netherlands)	1.45
182 (22)	Montserrat (UK)	1.44
183	Germany	1.44
184	Cuba	1.44
185	Switzerland	1.43
186	Sweden	1.43
187	Netherlands	1.43
188 (23)	Wallis and Futuna (France)	1.41
189	Uruguay	1.41
190	Norway	1.41
191 (24)	Bermuda (UK)	1.40
192	Luxembourg	1.40
193	Cyprus	1.39
194	Belgium	1.38
195	Saint Lucia	1.38
196	Bahamas	1.37
197 (25)	Guernsey (UK)	1.37
198 (26)	Anguilla (UK)	1.36
199 (27)	Jersey (UK)	1.36
200	Jamaica	1.36
201	Estonia	1.35
202	Canada	1.35
203	Albania	1.35
204	Latvia	1.34
205	Greece	1.33
206	Costa Rica	1.33
207	Austria	1.32
208	Poland	1.30
209	Finland	1.28
210 (28)	Saint Pierre and Miquelon (France)	1.27
211	Mauritius	1.24
212	Spain	1.21
213	Thailand	1.21
214	Japan	1.21
215	Belarus	1.21
216	Lithuania	1.20
217	United Arab Emirates	1.20
218	Italy	1.20
219	Chile	1.17
220	San Marino	1.15
221	Malta	1.10
222	Andorra	1.08
223 (29)	Curaçao (Netherlands)	1.07
224 (30)	British Virgin Islands (UK)	1.04
225	Vatican City	1.00
226	China	1.00
227	Ukraine	0.98
228	Singapore	0.94
229 (31)	Puerto Rico (US)	0.94
230	Taiwan (Taiwan)	0.87
231 (32)	Saint Barthélemy (France)	0.80
232	South Korea	0.72
233 (33)	Hong Kong (China)	0.72
234 (34)	Macau (China)	0.66
	Sovereign states: 200	
	Dependent territories: 34	
	Disputed territory: 1	
	World	
1	World	2.25
	United Nations Continental Major Regions	
1	Africa	4.07
2	Oceania	2.14
3	Asia	1.88
4	Latin America and the Caribbean	1.81
4	Northern America	1.60
5	Europe	1.40
	Development Level	
1	Least Developed	3.94
2	Less Developed	2.36
3	Less developed regions excluding least developed countries	2.02
4	More Developed	1.45
	Income Level	
1	Low Income	4.53
2	Middle Income	2.0
2.1	Lower Middle Income	2.55
2.2	Upper Middle Income	1.48
3	High Income	1.47
	Not ranked	
1 (1)	Christmas Island (Australia)	-
2 (2)	Cocos (Keeling) Islands (Australia)	-
3 (3)	Coral Sea Islands (Australia)	-
4 (4)	England (United Kingdom)	-
-	European Union	-
5 (5)	Mayotte (France)	-
6 (6)	Norfolk Island (Australia)	-
7 (..1..)	Paracel Islands (disputed territory) (Vietnam, until 1974) (occupied by China since 1974, also claimed by Taiwan (Taiwan) and Vietnam)	-
8 (7)	Pitcairn Islands (UK)	-
9 (8)	Saint Martin (France)	-
10 (9)	Scotland (United Kingdom)	-
11 (10)	South Georgia and the South Sandwich Islands (UK)	-
12 (..2..)	Spratly Islands (disputed territory) (partially occupied by six countries - China; Taiwan (Taiwan); Philippines; Malaysia; Vietnam and Brunei)	-
13 (11)	Svalbard (Norway)	-
14 (12)	Wales (United Kingdom)	-
	Sovereign states: 0	
	Dependent territories: 12	
	Disputed territories: 2	

== See also ==
- Total fertility rate
- List of countries by past fertility rate
- List of countries by number of births
- List of countries by birth rate
- List of countries by net reproduction rate
- List of people with the most children
- List of population concern organizations
- Population growth
- Sub-replacement fertility
- Fertility and intelligence

Case studies

- Ageing of Europe
- Aging of Japan
