= Demographics of Guadeloupe =

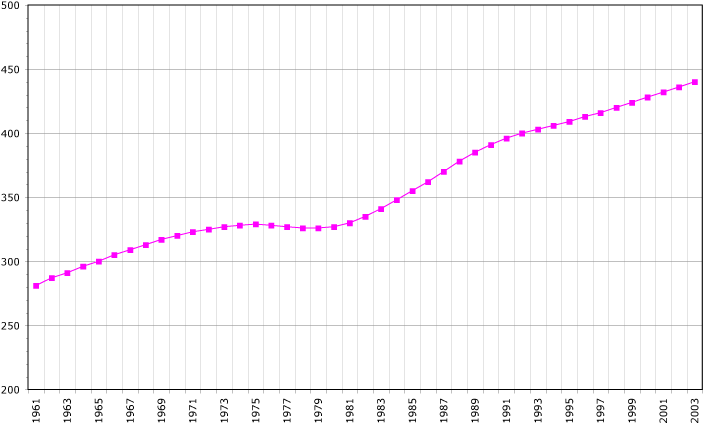
Guadeloupe's population, 1961–2003.

Guadeloupe has a population of 375,693 (2021).

== Population ==
According to INSEE Guadeloupe had an estimated population of 403,977 on 1 January 2012. Life expectancy at birth is 77.0 years for males, and 83.5 for females (figures for 2011).

=== Structure of the population ===
Structure of the population (01.01.2010) (Provisional estimates) (Excluding data for Saint Barthélemy and Saint Martin):

Age group	Male	Female	Total	%
Total	186 946	214 838	401 784	100
0–4	13 809	12 996	26 805	6.67
5–9	15 175	14 109	29 284	7.29
10–14	16 306	15 377	31 683	7.89
15–19	15 755	15 037	30 792	7.66
20–24	10 649	10 440	21 089	5.25
25–29	7 826	10 264	18 090	4.50
30–34	8 654	12 726	21 380	5.32
35–39	12 372	17 029	29 401	7.32
40–44	13 848	18 229	32 077	7.98
45–49	15 179	17 619	32 798	8.16
50–54	13 007	14 572	27 579	6.86
55–59	10 979	13 036	24 015	5.98
60–64	9 991	11 635	21 626	5.38
65–69	7 342	9 028	16 370	4.07
70–74	5 914	7 384	13 298	3.31
75–79	4 505	6 073	10 578	2.63
80–84	2 931	4 424	7 355	1.83
85–89	1 844	2 913	4 757	1.18
90–94	605	1 335	1 940	0.48
95+	255	612	867	0.22
Age group	Male	Female	Total	Percent
0–14	45 290	42 482	87 772	21.85
15–64	118 260	140 587	258 847	64.42
65+	23 396	31 769	55 165	13.73

Population by Sex and Age Group (Census 01.I.2015) (Excluding data for Saint Barthélémy and Saint Martin.):

Age group	Male	Female	Total	%
Total	183 479	214 511	397 990	100
0–4	11 292	11 118	22 410	5.63
5–9	13 707	13 062	26 769	6.73
10–14	15 004	14 790	29 794	7.49
15–19	14 731	14 269	29 000	7.29
20–24	10 153	9 731	19 884	5.00
25–29	8 227	10 039	18 266	4.59
30–34	7 926	11 600	19 526	4.91
35–39	9 201	13 111	22 312	5.61
40–44	12 518	16 630	29 148	7.32
45–49	13 926	17 434	31 360	7.88
50–54	14 748	17 227	31 975	8.03
55–59	12 884	14 790	27 674	6.95
60–64	11 204	13 431	24 635	6.19
65–69	9 336	10 991	20 327	5.11
70–74	6 850	8 503	15 353	3.86
75–79	5 315	6 642	11 957	3.00
80–84	3 359	5 193	8 552	2.15
85–89	1 891	3 472	5 364	1.35
90–94	882	1 742	2 625	0.66
95–99	268	549	817	0.21
100+	56	184	240	0.06
Age group	Male	Female	Total	Percent
0–14	40 003	38 970	78 973	19.84
15–64	115 519	138 265	253 784	63.77
65+	27 957	37 276	65 233	16.39

== Vital statistics ==
The following vital statistics include Saint Martin and Saint Barthélemy.

Census population and average annual growth rate
Year	Pop.	±% p.a.
1664	11,437	—
1789	106,593	+1.80%
1879	174,231	+0.55%
1961	276,545	+0.56%
1967	305,312	+1.66%
1974	315,848	+0.49%
1982	317,269	+0.06%
1990	353,431	+1.36%
1999	386,256	+0.99%
2009	401,554	+0.39%
The results do not include Saint Martin and Saint Barthélemy

	Population (Jan 1) (x1000)	Live births	Deaths	Natural change	Crude birth rate (per 1000)	Crude death rate (per 1000)	Natural change (per 1000)	Total fertility rate
1950	210	7 702	2 912	4 790	37.3	13.7	23.7	
1951	213	8 319	2 893	5 426	38.8	14.2	24.6	
1952	217	8 463	3 221	5 242	38.3	14.3	24.0	
1953	223	8 720	2 879	5 841	39.6	11.6	27.9	
1954	229	8 941	2 648	6 293	39.4	11.0	28.5	
1955	236	9 506	2 769	6 737	39.8	11.2	28.6	
1956	244	9 648	2 449	7 199	39.8	10.0	29.8	
1957	252	9 401	2 852	6 549	39.1	10.6	28.5	
1958	260	9 864	2 469	7 395	38.4	9.9	28.4	
1959	268	9 815	2 359	7 456	37.5	8.7	28.8	
1960	275	10 479	2 657	7 822	38.4	9.7	28.7	
1961	281	10 047	2 367	7 680	36.5	8.2	28.3	
1962	287	10 890	2 348	8 542	37.3	8.5	28.8	
1963	291	10 712	2 400	8 312	35.4	8.3	27.1	
1964	296	10 424	2 345	8 079	34.4	8.1	26.4	
1965	300	10 605	2 558	8 047	34.8	8.1	26.8	
1966	304	10 879	2 497	8 382	33.7	7.9	25.7	
1967	309	10 116	2 581	7 535	31.7	7.9	23.8	
1968	313	10 476	2 564	7 912	31.9	7.6	24.3	
1969	316	9 724	2 442	7 282	29.0	7.7	21.3	
1970	319	9 397	2 499	6 898	28.9	7.8	21.1	
1971	322	10 060	2 337	7 723	29.7	7.0	22.6	
1972	324	9 912	2 458	7 454	28.4	7.3	21.2	
1973	326	9 578	2 548	7 030	26.3	7.4	18.9	
1974	327	8 846	2 459	6 387	24.6	7.4	17.2	
1975	328	8 257	2 351	5 906	22.9	7.1	15.8	
1976	327	6 926	2 395	4 531	19.5	7.2	12.3	
1977	326	6 321	2 297	4 024	17.9	6.8	11.1	
1978	325	5 640	2 163	3 477	16.4	6.7	9.7	
1979	324	5 818	2 154	3 664	17.2	6.5	10.7	
1980	326	6 425	2 143	4 282	18.1	6.6	11.5	
1981	329	6 486	2 141	4 345	18.2	6.4	11.8	
1982	334	6 616	2 099	4 517	18.2	6.4	11.8	
1983	340	6 722	2 206	4 516	18.5	6.6	11.9	
1984	347	6 671	2 235	4 436	18.3	6.4	11.9	
1985	354	6 750	2 309	4 441	18.2	6.5	11.7	
1986	360	6 374	2 238	4 136	17.7	6.2	11.5	
1987	367	6 855	2 244	4 611	18.6	6.2	12.4	
1988	374	7 126	2 228	4 898	18.7	6.0	12.7	
1989	380	7 645	2 315	5 330	19.3	6.1	13.2	
1990	385	7 569	2 334	5 235	19.7	6.1	13.6	
1991	389	7 547	2 242	5 305	19.4	5.8	13.6	
1992	393	7 310	2 360	4 950	18.6	6.0	12.6	
1993	396	7 056	2 406	4 650	17.8	6.1	11.7	
1994	399	7 249	2 328	4 921	18.1	5.8	12.3	
1995	403	7 086	2 470	4 616	17.6	6.1	11.5	
1996	407	7 256	2 459	4 797	17.8	6.0	11.8	
1997	412	7 554	2 441	5 113	18.3	5.9	12.4	
1998	416	7 208	2 517	4 691	17.3	6.0	11.3	1.83
1999	385.609*	7 452	2 664	4 788	17.7	6.3	11.4	2.10
2000	425	7 601	2 634	4 967	17.9	6.2	11.7	2.19
2001	430	7 658	2 608	5 050	17.8	6.1	11.8	2.23
2002	433	7 032	2 765	4 267	16.2	6.4	9.8	2.07
2003	437	7 047	2 662	4 385	16.1	6.1	10.0	2.11
2004	441	7 273	2 676	4 597	16.5	6.1	10.4	2.26
2005	444	7 551	2 904	4 647	17.0	6.5	10.5	2.37
2006	447	7 193	2 902	4 291	16.1	6.5	9.6	2.33
2007	400.584	6 862	2 769	4 093	15.2	6.2	9.1	2.27
2008	401.784	6 758	2 916	3 842	14.9	6.4	8.5	2.20
2009	401.554	6 387	2 987	3 400	14.0	6.6	7.5	2.13
2010	403.355	6 242	3 095	3 147	13.6	6.7	6.9	2.12
2011	404.635	6 284	2 965	3 319	13.6	6.4	7.2	2.19
2012	403.314	6 133	3 003	3 130	13.2	6.5	6.8	2.20
2013	402.119	5 069	2 951	2 118	12.6	7.3	5.3	2.17
2014	400.186	5 001	3 290	1 711	12.5	8.2	4.3	2.19
2015	397.990	4 714	2 906	1 808	11.9	7.3	4.6	2.10
2016	394.110	4 653	3 227	1 426	11.8	8.2	3.6	2.14
2017	390.253	4 126	3 121	1 005	10.6	8.0	2.6	1.94
2018	387.629	4 249	3 258	991	11.0	8.4	2.6	2.04
2019	384.239	4 601	3 469	1 132	12.0	9.0	3.0	2.23
2020	383.559	4 678	3 742	936	12.2	9.7	2.5	2.27
2021	384.315	4 344	4 589	–245	11.3	12.0	–0.7	2.11
2022	383.569	4 218	4 041	177	11.0	10.5	0.5	2.08
2023	382.733	4 061	3 866	195	10.6	10.1	0.5	2.01
2024	381.909	3 608	3 839	–231	9.4	10.0	–0.6	1.75
2025	380.387	3 389			8.6	9.4	–0.8	

- Excluding data for Saint Barthélemy and Saint Martin

== Languages ==
French is the official language, taught in the school system. Antillean Creole French is spoken by a large part of the population, understood by nearly all, and taught in some schools. A 2007 document issued by the Organisation internationale de la Francophonie estimated the population to be 80.2% "francophone" and 14.9% "partially francophone".

== Religion ==
Figures in 2020 state that 96% of the population is Christian (of these, approximately 86% are Roman Catholic, 8% Protestant and 6% other Christian); of the other 4%, most have no religion, although there is a small number of Hindus, Baháʼís and Muslims.

== See also ==
- Demographics of France
