= Demographics of Saint Pierre and Miquelon =

This is a demography of the population of Saint Pierre and Miquelon including population density, ethnicity, education level, health of the populace, economic status, religious affiliations and other aspects of the population.

== Structure of the population ==
Population by Sex and Age Group (Census 19.I.2006):

| Age group | Male | Female | Total | % |
|---|---|---|---|---|
| Total | 3 034 | 3 091 | 6 125 | 100 |
| 0-4 | 143 | 146 | 289 | 4.72 |
| 5-9 | 211 | 206 | 417 | 6.81 |
| 10-14 | 237 | 224 | 461 | 7.53 |
| 15-19 | 188 | 178 | 366 | 5.98 |
| 20-24 | 136 | 122 | 258 | 4.21 |
| 25-29 | 166 | 167 | 333 | 5.44 |
| 30-34 | 202 | 229 | 431 | 7.04 |
| 35-39 | 294 | 274 | 568 | 9.27 |
| 40-44 | 293 | 282 | 575 | 9.39 |
| 45-49 | 246 | 225 | 471 | 7.69 |
| 50-54 | 238 | 197 | 435 | 7.10 |
| 55-59 | 231 | 201 | 432 | 7.05 |
| 60-64 | 143 | 137 | 280 | 4.57 |
| 65-69 | 115 | 128 | 243 | 3.97 |
| 70-74 | 83 | 125 | 208 | 3.40 |
| 75-79 | 42 | 86 | 128 | 2.09 |
| 80-84 | 35 | 79 | 114 | 1.86 |
| 85-89 | 19 | 56 | 75 | 1.22 |
| 90-94 | 12 | 18 | 30 | 0.49 |
| 95+ | 0 | 11 | 11 | 0.18 |
| Age group | Male | Female | Total | Percent |
| 0-14 | 591 | 576 | 1 167 | 19.05 |
| 15-64 | 2 137 | 2 012 | 4 149 | 67.74 |
| 65+ | 306 | 503 | 809 | 13.21 |

Population by Sex and Age Group (Census 01.I.2015):

| Age group | Male | Female | Total | % |
|---|---|---|---|---|
| Total | 2 940 | 3 081 | 6 021 | 100 |
| 0–4 | 142 | 172 | 315 | 5.23 |
| 5–9 | 200 | 191 | 392 | 6.51 |
| 10–14 | 197 | 194 | 392 | 6.51 |
| 15–19 | 174 | 160 | 335 | 5.56 |
| 20–24 | 117 | 88 | 205 | 3.40 |
| 25–29 | 140 | 131 | 271 | 4.50 |
| 30–34 | 172 | 205 | 378 | 6.28 |
| 35–39 | 188 | 201 | 390 | 6.48 |
| 40–44 | 219 | 233 | 452 | 7.51 |
| 45–49 | 281 | 286 | 567 | 9.42 |
| 50–54 | 273 | 258 | 531 | 8.82 |
| 55–59 | 233 | 217 | 450 | 7.47 |
| 60–64 | 198 | 179 | 377 | 6.26 |
| 65-69 | 138 | 163 | 301 | 5.00 |
| 70-74 | 101 | 112 | 214 | 3.55 |
| 75-79 | 92 | 102 | 195 | 3.24 |
| 80-84 | 38 | 96 | 134 | 2.23 |
| 85-89 | 24 | 54 | 78 | 1.30 |
| 90-94 | 8 | 25 | 33 | 0.55 |
| 95-99 | 3 | 8 | 11 | 0.18 |
| 100+ | 0 | 1 | 1 | 0.02 |
| Age group | Male | Female | Total | Percent |
| 0–14 | 539 | 557 | 1 096 | 18.20 |
| 15–64 | 1 997 | 1 738 | 3 735 | 62.03 |
| 65+ | 404 | 786 | 1 190 | 19.76 |

== CIA World Factbook demographic statistics ==
The following demographic statistics are from the CIA World Factbook, unless otherwise indicated.

=== Population ===
- 5,132 (July 2024)

=== Age structure ===
- 0-14 years: 13.1% (male 346; female 328)
- 15-64 years: 61.6% (male 1,559; female 1,600)
- 65 years and over: 25.3% (male 571, female 728; 2024 est.)

=== Population growth rate ===
- -1.21% (2024 est.)

=== Birth rate ===
- 6.4 births/1,000 population (2024 est.)

=== Death rate ===
- 11.7 deaths/1,000 population (2024 est.)

=== Net migration rate ===
- -6.8 migrant(s)/1,000 population (2024 est.)

=== Sex ratio ===
- at birth: 1.06 male(s)/female
- under 15 years: 1.05 male(s)/female
- 15-64 years: 0.97 male(s)/female
- 65 years and over: 0.78 male(s)/female
- total population: 0.93 male(s)/female (2024 est.)

=== Infant mortality rate ===
- 7.08 deaths/1,000 live births (2024 est.)

=== Life expectancy at birth ===
- total population: 81.8 years
- male: 79.5 years
- female: 84.3 years (2024 est.)

=== Total fertility rate ===
- 1.6 children born/woman (2024 est.)

=== Nationality ===
- noun: Frenchman, Frenchmen, Frenchwoman, Frenchwomen
- adjective: French

=== Ethnic groups ===
- Basques, Bretons, Normans (French fishermen), French Canadians, including descendants of Acadian refugees, and a number of descendants of Newfoundlanders.

=== Religions ===
Religions of Saint Pierre and Miquelon
| Religions | percent |
| Roman Catholic | 99% |
| Other | 1% |

=== Languages ===
- French (official)

=== Literacy ===
- definition: age 15 and over can read and write
- total population: 99%
- male: 99%
- female: 99% (1982 est.)

== See also ==
- Saint Pierre and Miquelon
- Demographics of France
