= Demographics of Mayotte =

Demographic features of the population of Mayotte include population density, ethnicity, religious affiliations and other aspects of the population.

== Population ==
Population, fertility rate and net reproduction rate, United Nations estimates

Census population and growth rate
Year	Pop.	±% p.a.
1958	23,364	—
1966	32,607	+4.25%
1978	47,246	+3.14%
1985	67,167	+5.15%
1991	94,410	+5.84%
1997	131,320	+5.65%
2002	160,265	+4.06%
2007	186,387	+3.07%
2012	212,645	+2.67%
2017	256,518	+3.82%
2023	310,022	+3.21%
Source: INSEE

Mayotte's population density went from 62 persons per square kilometer in 1958 to 829 per square kilometer in 2023. Its capital, Dzaoudzi had a population of 5,865 according to the 1985 census; the island's largest town, Mamoudzou, had 12,026 people. The population is expected to grow from its 2025 population of approximately 337 thousand, to 1.3 million by 2100, an increase of 285.76%.

=== Age structure ===
Population by Sex and Age Group (Census 05.IX.2017) (Data from the main operation):

Age group	Male	Female	Total	%
Total	122 261	134 257	256 518	100
0–4	20 359	19 946	40 305	15.71
5–9	18 523	19 126	37 649	14.68
10–14	16 910	17 392	34 302	13.37
15–19	12 391	13 234	25 625	9.99
20–24	6 959	9 583	16 542	6.45
25–29	6 882	10 211	17 093	6.66
30–34	7 252	10 307	17 559	6.85
35–39	7 561	9 469	17 030	6.64
40–44	6 723	7 574	14 297	5.57
45–49	6 064	5 443	11 507	4.49
50–54	3 823	3 653	7 476	2.91
55–59	3 142	2 921	6 063	2.36
60–64	2 231	1 981	4 212	1.64
65–69	1 540	1 344	2 884	1.12
70–74	788	842	1 630	0.64
75–79	546	600	1 146	0.45
80–84	315	318	633	0.25
85–89	143	179	322	0.13
90–94	58	63	121	0.05
95–99	30	37	67	0.03
100+	21	32	53	0.02
Age group	Male	Female	Total	Percent
0–14	55 792	56 464	112 256	43.76
15–64	63 028	74 378	137 406	53.57
65+	3 441	3 415	6 856	2.67

== Births and deaths ==
Year	Population	Live births	Deaths	Natural increase	Crude birth rate	Crude death rate	Rate of natural increase	TFR
2007	186,452	7,658	587	7,071	41.1	3.1	38.0	
2014	223,713	7,306	590	6,716	32.1	2.6	29.5	4.12
2015	232,189	8,997	636	8,361	38.0	2.7	35.3	4.87
2016	240,987	9,496	705	8,791	38.7	2.9	35.8	4.95
2017	250,143	9,762	735	9,027	38.3	2.9	35.4	4.92
2018	259,621	9,590	758	8,832	36.2	2.9	33.3	4.66
2019	269,579	9,768	777	8,991	35.6	2.8	33.8	4.58
2020	279,696	9,184	967	8,217	32.3	3.4	28.9	4.16
2021	289,039	10,613	1,144	9,469	36.1	3.9	32.2	4.65
2022	299,634	10,773	970	9,803	35.3	3.2	32.1	4.55
2023	310,199	10,278	958	9,320	32.6	3.0	29.6	4.21
2024	320,282	8,908	1,011	7,897	27.4	3.1	24.3	3.58
2025	329,282	9,072			27.0	3.0	24.0	3.50 (e)

== Languages ==
According to the 2019 survey on cultural practices in Mayotte conducted by Insee and the Ministry of Culture among a sample of more than 1,200 inhabitants aged 15 or over, 75% of the population aged 15+ declared mastering Shimaoré, 18% declared mastering Kibushi, and 81% mastered at least one of the two languages; among natives of Mayotte, this rose to 94%. French was declared mastered by only 55% of inhabitants aged 15+, with marked differences by origin: 36% among the foreign-born, 75% among natives of Mayotte, and 89% among natives of France outside Mayotte. Language mastery also varied by age and birthplace, 82% of natives of Mayotte declared mastering Shimaoré and 33% Kibushi, while Kibushi was less common among younger natives, with 24% of those aged 15–24 mastering it, among all inhabitants aged 15–24, 82% declared mastering French, compared with 29% of those aged 60 or over.

== Religions ==
Muslim 97%, Christian (mostly Roman Catholic)

Religion in Mayotte (ARDA 2020 est.)
1. Sunni (98.9%)
2. Shia (0.01%)
3. Catholic (0.15%)
4. Other Christian (0.32%)
5. None (0.18%)
6. Other (0.46%)

== See also ==
- Santé à Mayotte
- Demographics of France
