= Demographics of Palau =

Demographic features of the population of Palau include population density, ethnicity, education level, the health of the populace, economic status, religious affiliations and other aspects. About 70% of the Palauan population lives in the city of Koror on Koror Island. Koror is the former capital of the nation. The present capital is Ngerulmud, in Melekeok State on the bigger but less developed island of Babeldaob—the second-largest island in Micronesia after Guam.

== Population ==
- 21,779 (2023 est.)

=== Structure of the population ===
Population by Sex and Age Group (Census 01.IV.2020):

Age group	Male	Female	Total	%
Total	9 494	8 120	17 614	100
0–4	527	486	1 013	5.75
5–9	624	540	1 164	6.61
10–14	605	597	1 202	6.82
15–19	536	507	1 043	5.92
20–24	478	419	897	5.09
25–29	796	540	1 336	7.58
30–34	794	566	1 360	7.72
35–39	818	551	1 369	7.77
40–44	827	605	1 432	8.13
45–49	818	627	1 445	8.20
50–54	704	673	1 377	7.82
55–59	669	596	1 265	7.18
60–64	542	498	1 040	5.90
65-69	375	382	757	4.30
70-74	207	231	438	2.49
75+	174	302	476	2.70
Age group	Male	Female	Total	Percent
0–14	1 756	1 623	3 379	19.18
15–64	6 982	5 582	12 564	71.33
65+	756	915	1 671	9.49

== Vital statistics ==
Births and deaths

Year	Population	Live births	Deaths	Natural increase	Crude birth rate	Crude death rate	Rate of natural increase	TFR
1990	15,122	326	117	209	21.6	7.7	13.9	2.79
1991	15,575	347	102	245	22.4	6.5	15.9	
1992	15,969	377	116	261	23.6	7.3	16.3	
1993	16,361	355	116	239	21.7	7.1	14.6	
1994	16,744	373	129	244	22.3	7.7	14.6	
1995	17,225	399	110	289	23.2	6.4	16.8	2.33
1996	17,600	355	144	211	20.2	8.2	12.0	
1997	18,061	330	121	209	18.3	6.7	11.6	
1998	18,494	280	125	155	15.1	6.8	8.3	
1999	18,882	250	131	119	13.2	6.9	6.3	
2000	19,129	278	125	153	14.5	6.5	8.0	1.83
2001	19,626	300	138	162	15.3	7.0	8.3	
2002	19,976	259	134	125	13.0	6.7	6.3	
2003	20,304	312	136	176	15.4	6.7	8.7	
2004	20,610	259	142	117	12.6	6.9	5.7	
2005	19,907	279	134	145	14.0	6.7	7.3	2.02
2006	21,669	259	144	115	12.0	7.2	4.8	
2007	20,227	279	152	127	13.8	7.5	6.3	
2008	20,389	295	170	125	14.5	8.4	6.1	
2009	20,552	273	174	99	13.3	8.5	4.8	
2010	20,717	247	168	79	11.9	8.1	3.8	
2011	20,882	247	173	74	11.8	8.3	3.5	
2012	17,501	268	164	104	15.3	9.4	5.9	
2013	17,554	229	192	37	13.0	10.9	2.1	2.28
2014	17,607	241	167	74	13.7	9.5	4.2	2.42
2015	17,661	242	136	106	13.7	7.7	6.0	2.41
2016	17,715	212	175	37	12.0	9.9	2.1	2.09
2017	17,769	221	183	38	12.4	10.3	2.1	2.17
2018	18,302	256	143	113	14.0	7.8	6.2	2.42
2019	18,851	212	192	20	11.2	10.2	1.0	1.96
2020	17,614	213	148	65	12.1	8.4	3.7	2.063
2021	17,596	224	170	54	12.7	9.7	3.0	2.17
2022	17,579	155	201	-46	8.8	11.4	-2.6	1.52
2023	17,600	183	179	4	10.4	10.2	0.2	1.80

== Ethnic groups ==
- Palauan (Micronesian with Malayan and Melanesian admixtures) 73%
- Carolinian 2%
- Asian 21.7%
- White 1.2%,
- Other 2.1% (2020 est.)

== Languages ==
- Palauan (official) 65.2%
- English (official) 19.1%
- Filipino 9.9%
- Other Micronesian 1.9%
- Chinese 1.2%
- Other 2.8% (2015 est.)

== Religions ==
Religion in Palau
Roman Catholic	45.3%
Protestant	34.9%
Modekngei	5.7%
Islam	3%
Mormon	1.5%
Atheists/Agnostics	1.1%
Unspecified	4.4%

- Roman Catholic 45.3%
- Protestant 34.9% (includes Protestant (general) 26.4%)
- Seventh-day Adventist 6.9%,
- Other Protestant 1.6%
- Modekngei 5.7% (indigenous to Palau)
- Islam (Muslims) 3%
- Mormonism 1.5%
- Other 9.7%

(2015 est.)
