= List of countries by past fertility rate =

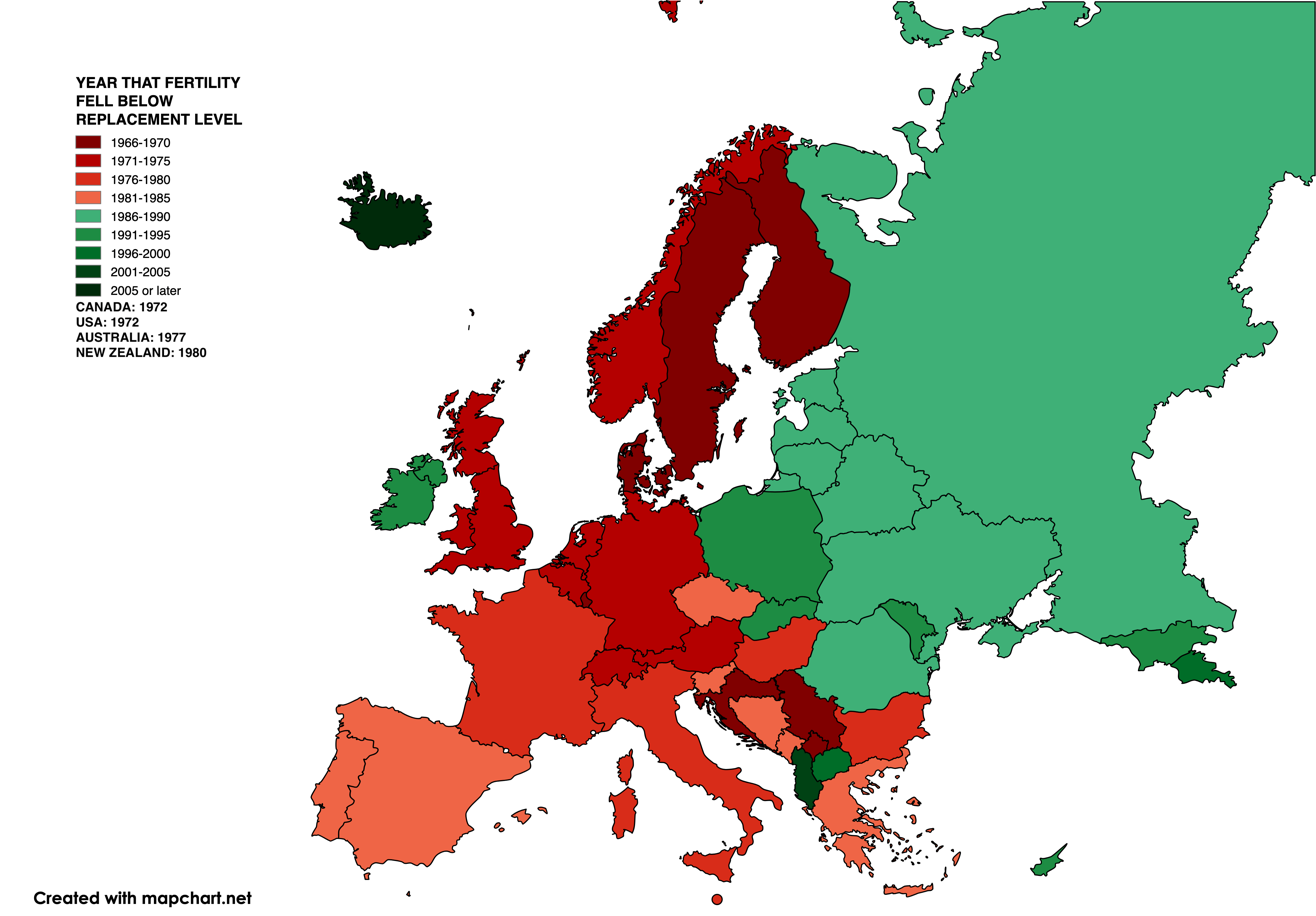
A map of when European fertility rates fell below replacement levels

This is a list of countries showing past fertility rate, ranging from 1900 to 2015 in five-year periods, as estimated by the World Population Prospects database by the United Nations Population Division and Our World in Data.

The fertility rate equals the expected number of children born per woman in her child-bearing years.

== List of countries ==
=== 1900–1950 ===
Fertility rate per woman
Country/dependent territory	1900–1905	1905–1910	1910–1915	1915–1920	1920–1925	1925–1930	1930–1935	1935–1940	1940–1945	1945–1950
Albania							3.57	4.19	4.36	5.33
Argentina	5.91	5.63	5.31	5.08	4.72	4.34	3.89	3.49	3.39	3.22
Armenia	8.03	7.98	7.93	7.88	7.83	7.50	6.74	5.98	3.00	3.75
Australia	3.56	3.38	3.48	3.16	3.06	2.80	2.28	2.19	2.44	2.96
Austria	4.26	3.90	3.44	2.81	3.13	2.55	2.09	1.99	2.37	1.87
Barbados	5.05	5.03	5.00	4.99	4.89	4.56	4.32	4.28	4.34	4.44
Belarus	5.92	5.77	5.61	5.45	5.29	5.03	4.49	3.93	3.37	2.84
Belgium	3.73	3.47	3.20	2.94	2.67	2.41	2.16	2.02	1.90	2.41
Bolivia	6.48	6.48	6.48	6.48	6.48	6.48	6.50	6.56	6.62	6.68
Brazil	5.81	5.85	5.90	5.90	5.90	5.90	5.90	5.90	5.95	6.09
Bulgaria	5.73	5.72	5.48	5.37	5.19	4.65	3.94	3.31	3.08	2.96
Canada	4.03	4.04	3.99	3.74	3.39	3.26	3.04	2.69	2.92	3.37
Chile	5.94	6.15	6.11	5.80	5.68	5.60	5.39	4.95	4.95	4.92
China	5.50	5.50	5.50	5.50	5.50	5.50	5.45	5.33	5.06	5.08
Colombia	6.23	6.33	6.35	6.36	6.42	6.43	6.25	6.14	6.13	6.34
Costa Rica	7.05	7.22	7.25	6.79	6.75	6.88	6.69	6.53	6.73	6.53
Croatia	5.38	5.18	4.98	5.19	5.20	4.77	4.26	3.75	3.24	2.89
Cuba	5.33	5.79	5.80	5.79	5.46	4.93	4.47	4.25	4.07	4.43
Cyprus	4.04	4.10	4.48	4.36	3.79	3.89	4.31	4.37	4.30	3.95
Czech Republic	4.68	4.27	3.82	3.28	2.85	2.29	1.95	1.76	2.51	2.95
Denmark	4.04	3.83	3.54	3.14	2.98	2.48	2.19	2.15	2.59	2.76
Ecuador	6.98	6.92	6.85	6.82	6.97	7.13	7.08	6.95	6.75	6.71
Egypt			5.99	6.01	6.07	6.24	6.29	5.93	5.99	6.40
El Salvador	5.87	5.85	5.94	5.84	6.19	6.29	6.22	6.10	6.07	6.07
Estonia	3.83	3.58	3.32	2.76	2.55	2.46	2.25	2.14	2.14	2.11
Finland	4.80	4.72	4.36	3.55	3.49	2.97	2.48	2.46	2.41	3.35
France	2.82	2.64	2.47	1.45	2.50	2.32	2.21	2.11	2.07	2.98
Georgia	7.65	7.26	6.88	6.50	6.11	5.73	5.13	4.22	3.56	3.27
Germany	4.82	4.41	3.67	2.58	2.49	2.04	1.74	2.17	2.07	2.08
Greece	5.22	4.60	3.97	3.34	2.77	3.87	3.97	3.56	3.13	2.55
Guatemala		6.19	6.33	6.29	6.54	6.76	6.73	6.37	6.18	6.39
Guyana	5.36	5.52	4.95	4.39	4.84	5.00	5.01	5.08	5.37	5.45
Honduras			6.18	6.10	6.33	6.32	6.12	6.05	6.10	6.32
Hungary	5.16	4.85	4.50	4.09	3.56	3.13	2.75	2.48	2.54	2.72
Iceland	4.08	3.99	3.87	3.92	3.74	3.49	3.31	2.86	3.13	3.63
India	5.72	5.72	5.71	5.71	5.77	5.82	5.88	5.93	5.92	5.91
Indonesia	6.03	6.14	6.07	5.46	5.47	5.45	5.43	5.40	5.38	5.35
Ireland	3.06	3.13	3.09	2.81	2.83	2.72	2.61	2.66	2.87	3.48
Israel						4.40	4.30	3.74	3.49	4.21
Italy	4.47	4.45	4.28	3.40	3.69	3.56	3.14	2.98	2.70	2.77
Jamaica	4.98	5.23	5.00	5.11	5.26	4.82	4.84	4.39	4.06	3.89
Japan	4.82	4.84	5.10	4.89	5.20	5.07	4.69	4.21	3.94	3.99
Kazakhstan	6.40	6.37	6.34	6.30	6.27	6.15	5.90	5.66	5.15	4.54
Kyrgyzstan									4.34	4.28
Latvia						2.84	2.53	2.41	2.39	2.15
Lithuania	4.86	4.61	4.34	4.09	3.83	3.65	3.45	3.12	3.04	2.85
Luxembourg	4.13	4.00	3.57	2.96	2.72	2.62	2.36	1.79	1.73	2.34
Malaysia							4.91	5.30	5.22	5.20
Malta	5.33	5.23	4.54	4.30	4.55	4.51	4.57	4.48	4.67	5.06
Mauritius	5.09	4.83	4.94	4.68	5.10	5.11	4.29	4.20	4.40	5.51
Mexico	6.39	6.12	5.79	5.55	5.97	5.95	5.95	5.87	6.02	6.40
Netherlands	4.44	4.17	3.86	3.53	3.62	3.12	2.80	2.57	2.82	3.45
New Zealand	3.52	3.65	3.50	3.26	3.08	2.71	2.44	2.51	3.05	3.54
Nicaragua	6.16	6.16	6.16	6.16	6.16	6.16	6.16	6.26	6.50	6.74
Norway	4.25	3.91	3.72	3.38	3.20	2.43	1.99	1.84	2.12	2.60
Panama	5.39	5.45	5.46	5.11	5.31	5.21	5.04	5.08	5.27	5.41
Peru	6.80	6.75	6.70	6.65	6.60	6.55	6.56	6.64	6.74	6.84
Philippines	6.09	5.37	5.99	5.82	5.96	6.01	5.68	5.65	5.76	6.33
Poland	5.27	5.01	4.71	3.67	4.66	4.39	3.87	3.36	3.13	3.45
Portugal	4.12	4.01	4.40	3.98	4.29	4.13	3.84	3.41	3.20	3.29
Puerto Rico (USA)			4.69	5.04	5.07	4.87	5.11	5.24	5.30	5.49
Romania	5.28	5.38	5.60	4.25	4.88	4.63	4.52	4.04	3.11	3.19
Russia	7.27	7.08	7.06	4.55	6.12	6.57	4.79	4.73	3.03	2.67
Serbia	5.40	5.08	5.16	4.92	4.70	4.48	4.26	4.05	3.84	3.68
Singapore	5.47	5.39	5.40	5.58	5.84	6.35	7.03	7.48	6.23	6.38
Slovakia	5.20	4.92	4.34	3.04	4.53	3.78	3.18	2.79	2.93	3.17
Slovenia	4.48	4.35	4.08	2.61	3.87	3.61	3.35	2.88	2.78	2.67
South Korea			5.92	5.95	5.89	5.98	6.13	6.28	6.32	5.97
Spain	4.65	4.56	4.34	4.18	4.03	3.77	3.57	2.81	2.76	2.77
Sri Lanka	5.52	5.39	5.66	5.94	5.84	6.17	5.74	5.39	5.61	5.75
Sweden	3.89	3.71	3.37	2.85	2.72	2.10	1.82	1.76	2.16	2.49
Switzerland	3.77	3.53	3.04	2.51	2.38	2.17	1.93	1.79	2.20	2.55
Taiwan		5.66	5.99	5.69	5.93	6.24	6.48	6.38	5.91	5.74
Trinidad and Tobago	4.91	4.69	4.33	4.24	4.19	4.28	4.03	4.35	4.90	5.28
Turkey								6.69	6.65	6.82
Ukraine	6.56	6.23	5.90	5.57	5.24	4.83	4.18	3.51	3.04	2.84
United Kingdom	3.44	3.18	2.92	2.22	2.57	2.06	1.83	1.79	1.93	2.37
United States	3.83	3.66	3.54	3.34	3.18	2.78	2.26	2.04	2.36	2.88
Uruguay	4.38	4.42	4.28	3.78	3.49	3.31	2.99	2.71	2.68	2.69
Venezuela	5.65	5.82	5.91	5.59	5.55	5.69	5.40	5.40	5.57	5.95
Vietnam			4.15	4.50	4.47	4.71	4.86	4.99	5.01	4.97
World	5.49	5.41	5.33	5.06	5.17	5.10	4.91	4.83	4.71	4.79

=== 1950–2015 ===
Fertility rate per woman
Country/dependent territory	1950–1955	1955–1960	1960–1965	1965–1970	1970–1975	1975–1980	1980–1985	1985–1990	1990–1995	1995–2000	2000–2005	2005–2010	2010–2015
Afghanistan	7.45	7.45	7.45	7.45	7.45	7.45	7.45	7.45	7.48	7.65	7.18	6.37	5.26
Albania	6.23	6.55	6.23	5.26	4.60	3.90	3.41	3.15	2.79	2.38	1.95	1.64	1.71
Algeria	7.28	7.38	7.65	7.65	7.57	7.18	6.32	5.30	4.12	2.88	2.38	2.72	2.96
Angola	7.30	7.35	7.60	7.60	7.60	7.60	7.40	7.35	7.10	6.75	6.55	6.35	5.95
Antigua and Barbuda	4.50	4.50	4.30	4.00	3.26	2.24	2.14	2.07	2.09	2.31	2.27	2.17	2.10
Argentina	3.15	3.13	3.09	3.05	3.15	3.44	3.15	3.05	2.90	2.63	2.52	2.40	2.34
Armenia	4.49	4.90	4.45	3.45	3.04	2.60	2.50	2.60	2.38	1.75	1.65	1.72	1.65
Aruba (Netherlands)	5.65	5.15	4.40	3.30	2.65	2.45	2.36	2.30	2.17	1.95	1.82	1.76	1.80
Australia	3.18	3.41	3.27	2.87	2.54	1.99	1.91	1.86	1.86	1.79	1.77	1.95	1.88
Austria	2.10	2.57	2.78	2.57	2.04	1.65	1.60	1.45	1.48	1.39	1.38	1.40	1.45
Azerbaijan	5.20	5.60	6.00	5.40	4.60	3.80	3.30	3.20	2.90	2.25	1.90	1.83	2.10
Bahamas	4.05	4.31	4.50	3.58	3.54	2.95	3.05	2.65	2.64	2.33	1.87	1.91	1.81
Bahrain	6.97	6.97	7.17	6.97	5.95	5.23	4.63	4.08	3.40	2.95	2.65	2.25	2.12
Bangladesh	6.36	6.62	6.80	6.92	6.91	6.63	5.98	4.98	4.06	3.43	2.94	2.48	2.22
Barbados	4.42	4.30	4.27	3.53	2.72	2.16	1.92	1.77	1.73	1.74	1.75	1.77	1.79
Belarus	2.61	2.73	2.59	2.28	2.25	2.09	2.09	2.08	1.68	1.31	1.26	1.43	1.64
Belgium	2.36	2.50	2.65	2.39	2.01	1.70	1.60	1.56	1.61	1.60	1.68	1.82	1.78
Belize	6.65	6.55	6.45	6.35	6.25	6.20	5.40	4.70	4.35	3.85	3.35	2.84	2.64
Benin	5.86	6.13	6.42	6.65	6.83	7.00	7.01	6.88	6.56	6.16	5.78	5.49	5.22
Bhutan	6.67	6.67	6.67	6.67	6.67	6.67	6.39	6.11	5.07	4.13	3.14	2.62	2.20
Bolivia	6.89	6.77	6.61	6.41	6.15	5.89	5.51	5.08	4.70	4.29	3.82	3.39	3.04
Bosnia and Herzegovina	4.82	3.97	3.68	3.14	2.73	2.27	2.02	1.86	1.70	1.68	1.32	1.31	1.31
Botswana	6.50	6.58	6.65	6.70	6.55	6.35	5.95	4.90	4.25	3.68	3.15	2.90	2.88
Brazil	6.10	6.05	6.00	5.37	4.68	4.28	3.82	3.16	2.51	2.33	2.09	1.82	1.73
Brunei	6.90	6.89	6.66	5.90	5.49	4.45	3.79	3.47	3.08	2.51	1.99	1.80	1.90
Bulgaria	2.53	2.30	2.22	2.13	2.16	2.19	2.01	1.95	1.55	1.20	1.24	1.45	1.51
Burkina Faso	6.10	6.24	6.35	6.56	6.70	7.02	7.17	7.07	6.93	6.73	6.43	6.08	5.65
Burundi	6.80	6.86	7.07	7.27	7.30	7.44	7.40	7.55	7.40	7.15	6.85	6.50	6.00
Cambodia	6.95	6.95	6.95	6.70	6.16	5.42	6.37	5.99	5.13	4.25	3.44	3.08	2.70
Cameroon	5.49	5.53	5.80	6.08	6.31	6.50	6.70	6.60	6.22	5.75	5.45	5.25	4.95
Canada	3.64	3.88	3.68	2.61	1.98	1.73	1.63	1.62	1.69	1.56	1.52	1.64	1.61
Cape Verde	6.57	6.76	6.97	6.97	6.86	6.62	6.10	5.63	4.93	4.14	3.42	2.89	2.50
Central African Republic	5.52	5.75	5.90	5.95	5.95	5.95	5.95	5.90	5.70	5.55	5.45	5.30	5.10
Chad	6.10	6.20	6.30	6.40	6.67	6.87	7.04	7.21	7.39	7.41	7.24	6.85	6.31
Guernsey and Jersey (UK)	2.06	2.22	2.56	2.36	1.86	1.52	1.44	1.45	1.46	1.40	1.41	1.42	1.46
Chile	5.15	5.17	4.95	4.44	3.58	2.95	2.70	2.64	2.43	2.21	2.03	1.94	1.82
China	6.02	5.40	6.20	6.25	4.77	3.00	2.55	2.72	1.90	1.51	1.55	1.58	1.60
Colombia	6.76	6.76	6.76	6.18	4.90	4.25	3.70	3.18	2.84	2.50	2.30	2.10	1.93
Comoros	6.00	6.60	6.91	7.05	7.05	7.05	7.05	6.70	6.10	5.60	5.20	4.90	4.60
Costa Rica	5.95	6.39	6.28	5.26	4.06	3.70	3.50	3.31	3.01	2.61	2.17	2.01	1.85
Croatia	2.73	2.38	2.22	2.00	1.98	1.90	1.87	1.72	1.52	1.62	1.41	1.52	1.49
Cuba	4.15	3.70	4.68	4.30	3.60	2.15	1.85	1.85	1.65	1.64	1.59	1.58	1.71
Curaçao (Netherlands)	5.07	5.10	4.40	3.80	2.87	2.45	2.25	2.30	2.28	2.12	2.09	1.98	2.07
Cyprus	3.70	3.50	3.44	2.80	2.49	2.29	2.45	2.43	2.33	1.89	1.59	1.48	1.38
Czech Republic	2.74	2.38	2.21	1.96	2.21	2.36	1.97	1.90	1.65	1.17	1.19	1.43	1.48
Democratic Republic of the Congo	5.98	5.98	6.04	6.15	6.29	6.46	6.60	6.71	6.77	6.77	6.72	6.63	6.40
Denmark	2.55	2.55	2.58	2.27	1.96	1.68	1.43	1.54	1.75	1.76	1.76	1.85	1.73
Djibouti	6.31	6.39	6.55	6.71	6.84	6.64	6.45	6.18	5.85	4.81	4.21	3.55	3.10
Dominican Republic	7.60	7.64	7.35	6.65	5.68	4.76	4.15	3.65	3.31	2.98	2.83	2.67	2.53
Ecuador	6.75	6.75	6.65	6.40	5.80	5.05	4.45	4.00	3.55	3.20	2.88	2.73	2.59
Egypt	6.75	6.75	6.65	6.45	6.00	5.70	5.49	5.15	4.12	3.40	3.15	2.98	3.38
El Salvador	6.36	6.60	6.67	6.36	5.95	5.44	4.75	4.17	3.78	3.34	2.72	2.40	2.17
Equatorial Guinea	5.67	5.65	5.67	5.79	5.80	5.79	5.89	5.98	5.97	5.94	5.69	5.40	4.99
Eritrea	6.96	6.96	6.82	6.70	6.62	6.62	6.70	6.51	6.20	5.60	5.10	4.80	4.40
Estonia	2.06	1.99	1.94	2.02	2.15	2.06	2.09	2.20	1.63	1.33	1.39	1.66	1.59
Eswatini (Swaziland)	6.70	6.70	6.75	6.85	6.87	6.73	6.50	6.00	5.20	4.45	4.00	3.75	3.30
Ethiopia	7.17	6.90	6.90	6.87	7.10	7.18	7.42	7.37	7.09	6.83	6.13	5.26	4.63
Federated States of Micronesia	7.20	7.00	6.90	6.90	6.90	6.40	6.00	5.20	4.79	4.53	4.05	3.62	3.33
Fiji	6.62	6.79	5.95	5.00	4.20	4.00	3.80	3.47	3.35	3.19	2.98	2.75	2.60
Finland	3.00	2.77	2.66	2.19	1.62	1.66	1.68	1.66	1.82	1.74	1.75	1.84	1.77
France	2.75	2.69	2.83	2.64	2.30	1.87	1.87	1.80	1.71	1.76	1.88	1.98	1.98
French Guiana (France)	5.00	4.92	5.02	5.00	4.18	3.30	3.58	3.73	4.05	3.93	3.72	3.64	3.45
French Polynesia (France)	6.00	5.86	5.44	5.20	4.86	4.23	3.82	3.64	3.11	2.61	2.36	2.17	2.07
Gabon	3.99	4.20	4.59	4.93	5.23	5.57	5.72	5.58	5.22	4.77	4.35	4.15	4.00
Gambia	5.29	5.46	5.70	5.96	6.20	6.34	6.29	6.14	6.08	5.99	5.90	5.76	5.62
Georgia	2.75	2.91	2.93	2.80	2.60	2.39	2.27	2.26	2.05	1.72	1.58	1.80	2.00
Germany	2.13	2.27	2.47	2.36	1.71	1.51	1.46	1.43	1.30	1.35	1.35	1.36	1.43
Ghana	6.44	6.64	6.84	6.95	6.90	6.69	6.35	5.88	5.34	5.02	5.02	4.64	4.37
Greece	2.48	2.42	2.29	2.55	2.53	2.42	2.06	1.58	1.42	1.35	1.33	1.46	1.34
Grenada	5.80	6.70	6.40	4.80	4.60	4.30	4.23	4.14	3.46	2.81	2.43	2.30	2.18
Guadeloupe (France)	5.61	5.61	5.61	5.22	4.49	3.52	2.55	2.45	2.10	2.10	2.08	2.06	2.00
Guam (USA)	5.53	5.83	6.03	4.72	4.12	3.52	3.08	3.14	2.88	2.88	2.74	2.54	2.42
Guatemala	7.12	6.99	6.80	6.70	6.58	6.46	6.16	5.58	5.31	4.83	4.33	3.62	3.19
Guinea	6.00	6.07	6.15	6.18	6.29	6.45	6.59	6.63	6.51	6.24	5.91	5.54	5.13
Guinea-Bissau	5.90	5.90	5.95	6.00	6.10	6.25	6.70	6.68	6.50	6.05	5.60	5.20	4.90
Guyana	6.04	6.45	6.15	5.70	4.99	4.06	3.64	3.13	3.08	3.05	2.95	2.73	2.60
Haiti	6.30	6.30	6.30	6.00	5.60	5.80	6.21	5.70	5.15	4.62	4.00	3.55	3.13
Honduras	7.50	7.50	7.42	7.42	7.05	6.60	6.00	5.37	4.92	4.34	3.76	3.15	2.65
Hong Kong (China)	4.44	4.72	5.05	3.64	3.01	2.23	1.72	1.36	1.26	1.06	0.95	1.04	1.20
Hungary	2.69	2.32	1.81	1.98	2.04	2.25	1.81	1.82	1.74	1.38	1.30	1.33	1.33
Iceland	3.86	4.17	3.94	3.24	2.87	2.45	2.23	2.12	2.19	2.06	1.99	2.13	1.98
India	5.90	5.90	5.89	5.72	5.41	4.97	4.68	4.27	3.83	3.48	3.14	2.80	2.44
Indonesia	5.49	5.67	5.62	5.57	5.30	4.73	4.11	3.40	2.90	2.55	2.52	2.50	2.45
Iran	6.91	6.91	6.91	6.68	6.24	6.28	6.53	5.62	3.95	2.63	1.97	1.79	1.75
Iraq	7.30	6.20	6.60	7.40	7.15	6.80	6.35	6.09	5.65	5.19	4.66	4.55	4.55
Ireland	3.42	3.58	4.06	3.76	3.82	3.24	2.76	2.18	1.90	1.94	1.96	2.00	2.00
Israel	4.28	3.89	3.85	3.78	3.81	3.47	3.13	3.07	2.93	2.93	2.91	2.93	3.04
Italy	2.36	2.29	2.50	2.50	2.32	1.89	1.52	1.35	1.27	1.22	1.30	1.42	1.43
Ivory Coast	7.45	7.62	7.76	7.90	7.93	7.81	7.31	6.85	6.41	6.05	5.68	5.40	5.14
Jamaica	4.22	5.08	5.64	5.78	5.00	4.00	3.55	3.10	2.84	2.70	2.45	2.28	2.08
Japan	2.96	2.17	2.03	2.04	2.13	1.83	1.76	1.65	1.48	1.37	1.30	1.34	1.41
Jordan	7.38	7.38	8.00	8.00	7.79	7.38	7.05	6.02	5.00	4.30	3.85	3.70	3.60
Kazakhstan	4.41	4.56	4.43	3.67	3.61	3.23	3.04	3.03	2.55	2.00	2.01	2.54	2.70
Kenya	7.48	7.78	8.06	8.11	7.99	7.64	7.22	6.54	5.65	5.35	5.00	4.65	4.10
Kiribati	6.10	6.60	6.78	6.04	5.00	5.10	5.00	4.80	4.55	4.20	3.96	3.88	3.79
Kuwait	7.20	7.20	7.30	7.40	6.75	5.60	5.00	3.65	2.55	3.00	2.60	2.40	2.05
Kyrgyzstan	4.36	5.20	5.55	5.21	5.12	4.59	4.20	4.06	3.64	2.96	2.50	2.78	3.12
Laos	5.94	5.96	5.97	5.98	5.99	6.15	6.36	6.27	5.88	4.81	3.90	3.40	2.93
Latvia	2.00	1.95	1.88	1.84	2.00	1.89	2.03	2.16	1.63	1.17	1.29	1.49	1.50
Lebanon	5.74	5.72	5.69	5.23	4.67	4.23	3.75	3.23	2.80	2.43	2.01	1.58	1.72
Lesotho	5.84	5.86	5.81	5.80	5.80	5.69	5.46	5.14	4.70	4.37	3.79	3.37	3.26
Liberia	6.27	6.35	6.47	6.59	6.80	6.93	6.96	6.72	6.27	6.05	5.68	5.23	4.83
Libya	7.14	7.20	7.30	7.99	8.10	7.67	6.68	5.71	4.22	3.20	2.64	2.43	2.40
Lithuania	2.84	2.66	2.43	2.30	2.30	2.10	2.04	2.06	1.82	1.47	1.28	1.42	1.59
Luxembourg	1.98	2.23	2.40	2.19	1.72	1.49	1.46	1.47	1.66	1.72	1.65	1.62	1.55
Macau (China)	4.39	4.81	4.41	2.74	1.79	1.41	2.06	2.00	1.40	1.12	0.83	0.94	1.19
North Macedonia	5.06	4.14	3.65	3.44	2.86	2.54	2.45	2.27	2.12	1.83	1.64	1.46	1.50
Madagascar	7.30	7.30	7.30	7.30	7.20	6.95	6.50	6.25	6.10	5.80	5.28	4.83	4.40
Malawi	6.85	6.90	7.00	7.20	7.40	7.60	7.60	7.25	6.60	6.30	6.00	5.72	4.88
Malaysia	6.35	6.38	6.36	5.38	4.72	4.20	3.97	3.67	3.44	3.13	2.45	2.22	2.11
Maldives	6.03	6.81	7.12	7.22	7.17	6.85	7.26	6.66	5.16	3.52	2.57	2.26	2.22
Mali	6.95	6.95	7.00	7.10	7.15	7.15	7.15	7.15	7.15	6.95	6.85	6.70	6.35
Malta	4.14	3.80	3.15	2.12	2.01	2.12	1.94	2.03	1.99	1.88	1.47	1.39	1.41
Martinique (France)	5.71	5.71	5.45	5.00	4.08	2.65	2.14	2.14	1.96	1.90	1.92	2.06	1.95
Mauritania	6.34	6.71	6.79	6.79	6.75	6.57	6.34	6.15	5.91	5.61	5.31	5.07	4.88
Mauritius	5.90	5.90	6.20	4.61	3.47	3.10	2.30	2.31	2.25	2.03	1.93	1.70	1.49
Mayotte (France)	7.91	7.91	7.91	7.91	7.91	7.91	7.35	6.73	5.25	5.08	4.80	4.60	4.10
Mexico	6.75	6.78	6.75	6.75	6.71	5.40	4.37	3.75	3.23	2.85	2.61	2.40	2.29
Moldova	3.50	3.44	3.15	2.66	2.56	2.44	2.55	2.64	2.11	1.70	1.24	1.27	1.27
Mongolia	5.60	6.30	7.50	7.50	7.50	6.65	5.75	4.84	3.27	2.40	2.08	2.37	2.83
Montenegro	4.35	3.80	3.42	2.89	2.62	2.31	2.21	2.11	2.04	1.91	1.85	1.82	1.71
Morocco	6.61	6.90	7.10	6.85	6.40	5.90	5.40	4.45	3.70	2.97	2.68	2.55	2.60
Mozambique	7.00	7.00	6.90	6.85	6.80	6.55	6.40	6.30	6.10	5.85	5.80	5.65	5.45
Myanmar	6.00	6.00	6.10	6.10	5.74	5.15	4.65	3.80	3.20	2.95	2.87	2.55	2.30
Namibia	6.00	6.10	6.20	6.30	6.60	6.60	6.20	5.55	4.91	4.29	3.81	3.60	3.60
Nepal	5.96	5.96	5.96	5.96	5.87	5.80	5.62	5.33	4.97	4.41	3.64	2.96	2.32
Netherlands	3.05	3.10	3.17	2.79	2.10	1.60	1.51	1.55	1.59	1.60	1.74	1.75	1.73
New Caledonia (France)	5.22	5.22	5.22	5.21	5.20	3.91	3.34	3.02	2.94	2.58	2.32	2.28	2.24
New Zealand	3.69	4.07	3.85	3.35	2.84	2.18	1.97	2.03	2.07	1.95	1.95	2.14	2.04
Nicaragua	7.20	7.50	7.10	6.95	6.79	6.35	5.85	5.00	4.20	3.40	2.84	2.56	2.32
Niger	7.30	7.40	7.50	7.55	7.60	7.75	7.90	7.80	7.75	7.70	7.65	7.55	7.40
Nigeria	6.35	6.35	6.35	6.35	6.61	6.76	6.76	6.60	6.37	6.17	6.05	5.91	5.74
North Korea	3.46	5.12	3.85	4.39	4.00	2.85	2.80	2.36	2.25	2.01	2.00	2.00	1.95
Norway	2.60	2.84	2.90	2.80	2.35	1.81	1.69	1.80	1.89	1.86	1.81	1.92	1.82
Oman	7.25	7.25	7.25	7.31	7.41	8.10	8.32	7.85	6.27	4.46	3.20	2.90	2.90
Pakistan	6.60	6.60	6.60	6.60	6.60	6.60	6.44	6.30	5.67	4.99	4.23	3.98	3.98
Palestine	7.38	7.38	8.00	8.00	7.69	7.50	7.05	6.76	6.60	5.81	5.02	4.60	4.25
Panama	5.76	5.87	5.79	5.41	4.88	4.19	3.63	3.24	2.92	2.81	2.68	2.63	2.60
Papua New Guinea	6.24	6.26	6.28	6.21	6.09	5.87	5.47	4.97	4.70	4.64	4.38	4.13	3.84
Paraguay	6.50	6.50	6.45	6.15	5.35	5.20	5.12	4.77	4.31	3.88	3.24	2.89	2.60
Peru	6.95	6.95	6.95	6.70	6.00	5.40	4.65	4.10	3.57	3.10	2.80	2.60	2.50
Philippines	7.42	7.27	6.98	6.54	5.98	5.46	4.92	4.53	4.14	3.90	3.70	3.30	3.05
Poland	3.63	3.47	2.72	2.33	2.23	2.23	2.31	2.16	1.95	1.51	1.26	1.37	1.33
Portugal	3.10	3.12	3.19	3.12	2.83	2.55	2.01	1.62	1.48	1.46	1.45	1.37	1.28
Puerto Rico (USA)	4.97	4.82	4.37	3.41	2.99	2.76	2.46	2.26	2.18	1.98	1.85	1.72	1.52
Qatar	6.97	6.97	6.97	6.97	6.75	6.10	5.45	4.40	3.74	3.46	2.95	2.23	2.00
Republic of the Congo	5.68	5.79	5.99	6.19	6.35	6.35	6.00	5.55	5.21	5.12	5.07	5.00	4.86
Romania	3.06	2.74	2.10	2.87	2.65	2.55	2.26	2.22	1.51	1.34	1.32	1.45	1.48
Russia	2.85	2.82	2.55	2.02	2.03	1.94	2.04	2.12	1.54	1.25	1.30	1.44	1.70
Rwanda	8.00	8.15	8.20	8.20	8.28	8.43	8.38	7.80	6.55	5.90	5.40	4.85	4.20
Réunion (France)	6.93	6.57	6.56	5.67	3.88	3.12	2.78	2.71	2.40	2.33	2.44	2.40	2.40
Saint Lucia	6.00	6.94	6.79	6.48	5.69	5.20	4.20	3.65	3.15	2.60	1.85	1.60	1.51
Saint Vincent and the Grenadines	7.33	7.33	7.02	6.41	5.54	4.42	3.64	3.10	2.85	2.55	2.24	2.13	2.01
Samoa	7.63	7.63	7.63	7.35	7.00	6.49	5.91	5.35	4.92	4.62	4.44	4.47	4.16
São Tomé and Príncipe	6.20	6.20	6.30	6.40	6.52	6.50	6.24	5.96	5.68	5.41	5.15	4.90	4.67
Saudi Arabia	7.18	7.18	7.26	7.26	7.30	7.28	7.02	6.22	5.55	4.40	3.65	3.22	2.72
Senegal	6.80	6.90	7.10	7.25	7.30	7.28	7.28	6.78	6.28	5.72	5.28	5.10	5.00
Serbia	3.22	2.57	2.51	2.43	2.36	2.37	2.32	2.23	1.96	1.83	1.71	1.58	1.59
Seychelles	5.00	5.00	5.59	5.92	5.38	4.27	3.51	2.94	2.57	2.18	2.20	2.30	2.38
Sierra Leone	6.03	6.03	6.25	6.41	6.56	6.65	6.72	6.72	6.69	6.48	6.11	5.57	4.84
Singapore	6.61	6.34	5.12	3.64	2.82	1.84	1.69	1.70	1.73	1.57	1.35	1.26	1.23
Slovakia	3.50	3.24	2.91	2.54	2.51	2.46	2.27	2.15	1.87	1.40	1.22	1.32	1.39
Slovenia	2.68	2.38	2.34	2.26	2.20	2.16	1.93	1.65	1.33	1.25	1.21	1.44	1.58
Solomon Islands	6.40	6.40	6.40	6.54	7.24	7.04	6.43	6.12	5.53	4.90	4.60	4.40	4.06
Somalia	7.25	7.25	7.25	7.25	7.10	7.00	7.07	7.26	7.53	7.70	7.46	7.10	6.61
South Africa	6.05	6.05	6.00	5.80	5.50	5.05	4.60	4.00	3.34	2.95	2.75	2.62	2.55
South Korea	5.65	6.33	5.60	4.65	4.00	2.92	2.23	1.57	1.68	1.50	1.21	1.17	1.23
South Sudan	6.65	6.70	6.75	6.85	6.90	6.92	6.78	6.83	6.65	6.42	6.00	5.60	5.15
Spain	2.53	2.70	2.81	2.84	2.85	2.55	1.88	1.46	1.28	1.19	1.29	1.39	1.33
Sri Lanka	5.80	5.80	5.20	4.70	4.00	3.61	3.19	2.64	2.38	2.24	2.26	2.28	2.11
Sudan	6.65	6.65	6.67	6.70	6.90	6.92	6.63	6.30	6.00	5.65	5.30	5.00	4.75
Suriname	6.56	6.56	6.75	6.86	5.29	4.20	3.70	3.36	3.19	2.96	2.77	2.59	2.46
Sweden	2.24	2.25	2.31	2.17	1.91	1.66	1.64	1.91	2.01	1.56	1.67	1.89	1.90
Switzerland	2.31	2.39	2.60	2.36	1.87	1.54	1.54	1.55	1.54	1.48	1.41	1.47	1.53
Syria	7.23	7.38	7.54	7.56	7.54	7.32	6.77	5.87	4.80	4.30	3.80	3.35	3.10
Tajikistan	5.40	6.20	6.80	7.00	6.83	5.90	5.60	5.50	4.88	4.29	3.60	3.50	3.50
Taiwan	6.72	6.14	5.35	4.38	3.33	2.74	2.23	1.77	1.76	1.67	1.32	1.05	1.11
Tanzania	6.74	6.80	6.80	6.79	6.75	6.73	6.55	6.36	6.05	5.75	5.66	5.58	5.24
Thailand	6.14	6.14	6.13	5.98	5.05	3.92	2.94	2.30	1.99	1.77	1.60	1.56	1.53
Timor-Leste	6.44	6.35	6.37	6.16	5.54	4.30	5.39	5.21	5.68	7.00	6.96	6.53	5.91
Togo	6.33	6.42	6.65	6.94	7.20	7.28	7.06	6.62	6.02	5.54	5.31	5.04	4.69
Tonga	7.30	7.30	7.30	6.50	5.50	5.50	5.50	4.74	4.62	4.29	4.23	4.03	3.79
Trinidad and Tobago	5.30	5.30	5.04	3.81	3.45	3.24	3.28	2.75	2.18	1.82	1.75	1.80	1.80
Tunisia	6.65	6.85	6.99	6.92	6.38	5.65	4.82	4.00	2.98	2.34	2.04	2.02	2.25
Turkey	6.69	6.50	6.20	5.80	5.39	4.69	4.11	3.39	2.90	2.65	2.37	2.20	2.12
Turkmenistan	5.30	6.20	6.80	6.56	6.19	5.60	4.79	4.55	4.03	3.03	2.76	2.65	3.00
Uganda	6.90	6.95	7.05	7.12	7.10	7.10	7.10	7.10	7.06	6.95	6.74	6.38	5.91
Ukraine	2.81	2.70	2.13	2.02	2.08	1.98	2.00	1.95	1.62	1.24	1.15	1.38	1.49
United Arab Emirates	6.97	6.97	6.87	6.77	6.45	5.75	5.30	4.90	3.92	2.97	2.40	1.97	1.82
United Kingdom	2.18	2.49	2.81	2.57	2.01	1.73	1.78	1.84	1.78	1.74	1.66	1.87	1.88
United States	3.31	3.58	3.23	2.54	2.03	1.77	1.80	1.91	2.03	2.00	2.04	2.05	1.88
United States Virgin Islands (USA)	5.25	5.49	5.67	5.52	4.66	3.49	2.97	3.02	2.79	2.19	2.14	2.44	2.30
Uruguay	2.73	2.83	2.90	2.80	3.00	2.89	2.57	2.53	2.49	2.30	2.20	2.12	2.04
Uzbekistan	5.30	5.90	6.50	6.40	6.16	5.46	4.80	4.40	3.95	3.10	2.51	2.49	2.38
Vanuatu	7.60	7.35	7.00	6.46	6.11	5.75	5.40	5.04	4.83	4.59	4.11	3.63	3.41
Venezuela	6.46	6.46	6.66	5.90	4.94	4.47	3.96	3.65	3.25	2.94	2.72	2.55	2.40
Vietnam	5.40	6.16	6.42	6.46	6.33	5.50	4.60	3.85	3.23	2.25	1.92	1.93	1.96
Western Sahara	6.34	6.42	6.53	6.60	6.57	6.23	5.33	4.60	4.00	3.40	2.85	2.55	2.60
Yemen	7.35	7.40	7.60	7.80	7.90	8.60	8.80	8.80	8.20	6.80	5.90	5.00	4.40
Zambia	6.70	6.95	7.25	7.30	7.40	7.25	6.90	6.60	6.30	6.10	5.95	5.60	5.20
Zimbabwe	6.80	7.00	7.30	7.40	7.40	7.30	6.74	5.66	4.77	4.20	4.00	4.00	4.00
World	4.96	4.89	5.03	4.92	4.46	3.87	3.60	3.44	3.02	2.75	2.63	2.57	2.52

=== 2015–2025 ===
Fertility rate per woman
Country/dependent territory	2015–2020	2020–2025
Afghanistan	5.39	4.90
Albania	1.48	1.35
Algeria	3.04	2.80
American Samoa	2.56	2.30
Andorra	1.11	1.07
Angola	5.57	5.17
Antigua and Barbuda	1.49	1.58
Azerbaijan	1.93	1.69
Argentina	2.05	1.53
Australia	1.72	1.63
Austria	1.49	1.38
Bahamas	1.45	1.38
Bahrain	1.96	1.83
Bangladesh	2.20	2.16
Armenia	1.60	1.70
Barbados	1.72	1.71
Belgium	1.63	1.48
Bermuda	1.42	1.41
Bhutan	1.61	1.47
Bolivia	2.76	2.57
Bosnia and Herzegovina	1.44	1.49
Botswana	2.95	2.76
Brazil	1.72	1.63
Belize	2.29	1.98
Solomon Islands	4.00	3.60
British Virgin Islands	0.98	1.02
Brunei Darussalam	1.87	1.75
Bulgaria	1.55	1.69
Myanmar	2.23	2.13
Burundi	5.43	4.93
Belarus	1.54	1.29
Cambodia	2.72	2.60
Cameroon	4.74	4.37
Canada	1.52	1.37
Cabo Verde	1.83	1.53
Cayman Islands	1.34	1.54
Central African Republic	6.11	5.98
Sri Lanka	2.04	1.98
Chad	6.51	6.15
Chile	1.54	1.20
China	1.58	1.07
Taiwan	1.10	0.90
Colombia	1.72	1.66
Comoros	4.24	3.91
Mayotte	4.57	4.53
Congo	4.47	4.19
Democratic Republic of the Congo	6.32	6.07
Cook Islands	2.16	2.05
Costa Rica	1.67	1.35
Croatia	1.45	1.51
Cuba	1.58	1.44
Cyprus	1.34	1.38
Czechia	1.70	1.60
Benin	5.08	4.60
Denmark	1.72	1.59
Dominica	1.55	1.48
Dominican Republic	2.39	2.26
Ecuador	2.10	1.86
El Salvador	1.91	1.78
Equatorial Guinea	4.56	4.17
Ethiopia	4.40	4.04
Eritrea	4.08	3.77
Estonia	1.62	1.45
Faroe Islands	2.43	2.26
Falkland Islands (Malvinas)	1.71	1.69
Fiji	2.45	2.30
Finland	1.47	1.34
France	1.85	1.71
French Guiana	3.71	3.47
French Polynesia	1.68	1.51
Djibouti	2.89	2.65
Gabon	3.90	3.68
Georgia	2.11	1.86
Gambia	4.57	4.03
State of Palestine	3.74	3.35
Germany	1.55	1.49
Ghana	3.73	3.42
Gibraltar	1.95	1.89
Kiribati	3.17	3.34
Greece	1.36	1.36
Greenland	1.96	2.04
Grenada	1.49	1.56
Guadeloupe	2.10	2.14
Guam	2.80	3.00
Guatemala	2.34	2.78
Guinea	4.26	4.74
Guyana	2.43	2.58
Haiti	2.69	2.96
Honduras	2.51	2.66
China, Hong Kong SAR	0.76	1.10
Hungary	1.53	1.52
Iceland	1.61	1.74
India	1.99	2.19
Indonesia	2.14	2.25
Iran (Islamic Republic of)	1.69	1.91
Iraq	3.29	3.67
Ireland	1.64	1.76
Israel	2.88	3.07
Italy	1.23	1.30
Côte d'Ivoire	4.32	4.70
Jamaica	1.36	1.43
Japan	1.25	1.37
Kazakhstan	3.07	2.86
Jordan	2.67	2.96
Kenya	3.24	3.57
North Korea	1.79	1.84
South Korea	0.76	1.00
Kosovo	1.55	1.62
Kuwait	1.67	2.09
Kyrgyzstan	2.85	3.17
Lao People's Democratic Republic	2.44	2.66
Lebanon	2.25	2.35
Lesotho	2.72	3.05
Latvia	1.44	1.65
Liberia	3.98	4.36
Libya	2.38	2.61
Liechtenstein	1.52	1.50
Lithuania	1.29	1.63
Luxembourg	1.39	1.39
China, Macao SAR	0.72	1.00
Madagascar	4.01	4.25
Malawi	3.69	4.09
Malaysia	1.57	1.86
Maldives	1.58	1.78
Mali	5.64	6.14
Malta	1.11	1.25
Martinique	2.01	1.99
Mauritania	4.74	5.07
Mauritius	1.28	1.36
Mexico	1.93	2.05
Monaco	2.15	2.46
Mongolia	2.74	2.96
Republic of Moldova	1.73	1.82
Montenegro	1.83	1.79
Montserrat	1.63	1.73
Morocco	2.25	2.37
Mozambique	4.80	5.10
Oman	2.53	2.83
Namibia	3.25	3.48
Nauru	3.36	3.78
Nepal	1.99	2.15
Netherlands	1.50	1.61
Curaçao	1.08	1.47
Aruba	1.62	1.77
Sint Maarten (Dutch part)	1.45	1.57
Bonaire, Sint Eustatius and Saba	1.53	1.52
New Caledonia	1.99	2.05
Vanuatu	3.63	3.85
New Zealand	1.65	1.79
Nicaragua	2.23	2.36
Niger	6.08	6.79
Nigeria	4.51	5.10
Niue	2.53	2.73
Norway	1.45	1.61
Northern Mariana Islands	2.38	2.75
Micronesia (Fed. States of)	2.78	2.94
Marshall Islands	2.92	3.05
Palau	1.92	2.00
Pakistan	3.63	3.87
Panama	2.13	2.39
Papua New Guinea	3.14	3.41
Paraguay	2.44	2.57
Peru	2.00	2.14
Philippines	1.94	2.45
Poland	1.31	1.41
Portugal	1.45	1.38
Guinea-Bissau	3.88	4.33
Timor-Leste	2.77	3.36
Puerto Rico	0.94	1.11
Qatar	1.69	1.80
Réunion	2.16	2.19
Romania	1.72	1.71
Russian Federation	1.47	1.63
Rwanda	3.74	4.04
Saint Barthélemy	0.79	0.84
Saint Helena	1.64	1.68
Saint Kitts and Nevis	1.52	1.60
Anguilla	1.37	1.38
Saint Lucia	1.39	1.44
Saint Martin (French part)	2.74	2.72
Saint Pierre and Miquelon	1.28	1.44
Saint Vincent and the Grenadines	1.79	1.95
San Marino	1.14	1.11
Sao Tome and Principe	3.67	4.05
Saudi Arabia	2.24	2.56
Senegal	3.85	4.38
Serbia	1.50	1.48
Seychelles	2.15	2.27
Sierra Leone	3.84	4.33
Singapore	0.95	0.95
Slovakia	1.58	1.52
Viet Nam	1.92	1.98
Slovenia	1.59	1.60
Somalia	6.19	6.72
South Africa	2.22	2.28
Zimbabwe	3.72	3.79
Spain	1.21	1.27
South Sudan	3.92	4.42
Sudan	4.36	4.72
Western Sahara	2.19	2.33
Suriname	2.26	2.42
Eswatini	2.78	3.00
Sweden	1.53	1.77
Switzerland	1.45	1.51
Syrian Arab Republic	2.74	2.95
Tajikistan	3.10	3.32
Thailand	1.22	1.35
Togo	4.22	4.54
Tokelau	2.64	2.81
Tonga	3.15	3.37
Trinidad and Tobago	1.54	1.59
United Arab Emirates	1.20	1.33
Tunisia	1.85	2.17
Türkiye	1.66	2.00
Turkmenistan	2.71	2.91
Turks and Caicos Islands	1.48	1.66
Tuvalu	3.22	3.31
Uganda	4.34	4.93
Ukraine	1.04	1.29
North Macedonia	1.54	1.71
Egypt	2.76	3.15
United Kingdom	1.56	1.70
Guernsey	1.36	1.38
Jersey	1.36	1.41
Isle of Man	1.56	1.66
United Republic of Tanzania	4.64	4.94
United States of America	1.63	1.73
United States Virgin Islands	2.10	2.18
Burkina Faso	4.23	5.00
Uruguay	1.43	1.76
Uzbekistan	3.36	2.73
Venezuela	2.09	2.18
Wallis and Futuna Islands	1.44	1.89
Samoa	3.87	4.17
Yemen	4.55	4.61
Zambia	4.14	4.54

== List of regions ==
=== 1900–1950 ===
Fertility rate per woman
Region	1900–1905	1905–1910	1910–1915	1915–1920	1920–1925	1925–1930	1930–1935	1935–1940	1940–1945	1945–1950
Africa			5.99	6.01	6.07	6.24	6.29	5.93	5.99	6.40
Asia	5.95	5.84	5.81	5.77	5.72	5.73	5.65	5.61	5.29	5.43
Oceania	3.54	3.51	3.49	3.21	3.07	2.76	2.36	2.35	2.74	3.25
South America	6.02	6.04	5.99	5.83	5.76	5.71	5.55	5.42	5.42	5.49
Australia/New Zealand	3.54	3.51	3.49	3.21	3.07	2.76	2.36	2.35	2.74	3.25
Western Europe	4.00	3.73	3.32	2.68	2.79	2.46	2.18	2.06	2.17	2.53
Caribbean	5.07	5.18	5.03	5.03	4.95	4.65	4.42	4.32	4.34	4.51
Eastern Europe	5.67	5.47	5.22	4.36	4.70	4.37	3.74	3.32	2.97	2.98
Europe	4.59	4.37	4.09	3.55	3.70	3.39	3.01	2.77	2.75	3.00
North America	4.75	4.61	4.44	4.21	4.18	4.00	3.75	3.53	3.77	4.22
Latin America	5.87	5.90	5.84	5.71	5.73	5.66	5.53	5.42	5.47	5.67
Eastern Asia	5.16	5.33	5.53	5.51	5.54	5.60	5.69	5.55	5.23	5.20
Central America	6.12	6.17	6.23	6.04	6.19	6.26	6.17	6.07	6.15	6.23
Southern Europe	4.88	4.68	4.47	3.99	4.14	4.09	3.87	3.49	3.39	3.46
Northern Europe	4.03	3.87	3.63	3.23	3.12	2.74	2.45	2.36	2.53	2.98
Northern Africa			5.99	6.01	6.07	6.24	6.29	5.93	5.99	6.40
Southern Asia	5.62	5.55	5.69	5.83	5.80	6.00	5.81	5.66	5.77	5.83
Southeast Asia	5.86	5.63	5.40	5.34	5.43	5.63	5.75	5.88	5.60	5.76
Central Asia	6.40	6.37	6.34	6.30	6.27	6.15	5.90	5.66	5.15	4.54

=== 1950–2015 ===
Fertility rate per woman
Region	1950–1955	1955–1960	1960–1965	1965–1970	1970–1975	1975–1980	1980–1985	1985–1990	1990–1995	1995–2000	2000–2005	2005–2010	2010–2015
Africa	6.62	6.66	6.72	6.72	6.71	6.64	6.48	6.18	5.72	5.34	5.08	4.89	4.72
Asia	5.80	5.56	5.81	5.73	5.03	4.10	3.70	3.50	2.92	2.56	2.41	2.30	2.20
Australia/New Zealand	3.27	3.53	3.38	2.96	2.59	2.02	1.92	1.89	1.90	1.82	1.80	1.99	1.91
Caribbean	5.27	5.19	5.48	5.00	4.37	3.62	3.41	3.13	2.83	2.64	2.49	2.38	2.28
Central America	6.76	6.81	6.75	6.68	6.55	5.49	4.60	3.99	3.50	3.09	2.80	2.54	2.38
Central Asia	4.86	5.32	5.57	5.16	5.02	4.51	4.13	4.00	3.57	2.89	2.51	2.66	2.71
Eastern Africa	7.05	7.05	7.11	7.11	7.14	7.10	7.02	6.80	6.41	6.12	5.76	5.35	4.89
Eastern Asia	5.56	4.98	5.53	5.53	4.36	2.86	2.48	2.59	1.87	1.51	1.52	1.56	1.59
Eastern Europe	2.92	2.82	2.43	2.15	2.14	2.07	2.08	2.09	1.63	1.30	1.26	1.42	1.57
Europe	2.66	2.66	2.57	2.37	2.17	1.98	1.88	1.81	1.57	1.43	1.43	1.55	1.60
Latin America	5.87	5.88	5.89	5.53	5.03	4.48	3.96	3.46	3.06	2.76	2.48	2.26	2.14
Melanesia	6.30	6.34	6.24	6.02	5.82	5.56	5.19	4.74	4.50	4.40	4.16	3.93	3.67
Micronesia	6.25	6.42	6.46	5.84	5.27	4.80	4.40	4.09	3.74	3.44	3.15	3.05	3.00
Middle Africa	6.08	6.11	6.24	6.35	6.50	6.65	6.73	6.76	6.67	6.52	6.39	6.24	5.94
Northern Africa	6.80	6.87	6.94	6.83	6.52	6.18	5.74	5.11	4.21	3.47	3.15	3.09	3.31
North America	3.34	3.61	3.28	2.55	2.02	1.77	1.79	1.88	2.00	1.95	1.99	2.01	1.85
Northern Europe	2.32	2.51	2.71	2.49	2.06	1.80	1.80	1.85	1.80	1.70	1.66	1.85	1.85
Oceania	3.84	4.06	3.94	3.55	3.21	2.73	2.60	2.51	2.49	2.46	2.44	2.53	2.41
Polynesia	6.78	6.86	6.82	6.39	5.74	5.23	4.79	4.37	3.96	3.55	3.32	3.17	2.97
South America	5.67	5.67	5.66	5.22	4.60	4.24	3.80	3.30	2.92	2.64	2.35	2.13	2.03
Southeast Asia	5.93	6.12	6.09	5.91	5.48	4.81	4.20	3.58	3.11	2.69	2.53	2.42	2.35
Southern Africa	6.06	6.07	6.03	5.86	5.60	5.19	4.75	4.15	3.50	3.09	2.85	2.71	2.64
Southern Asia	6.04	6.06	6.07	5.94	5.67	5.31	5.03	4.57	4.04	3.61	3.19	2.85	2.54
Southern Europe	2.68	2.62	2.70	2.68	2.56	2.24	1.83	1.56	1.42	1.34	1.37	1.44	1.42
Sub-Saharan Africa	6.57	6.60	6.67	6.70	6.77	6.78	6.70	6.49	6.16	5.90	5.65	5.40	5.10
Western Africa	6.56	6.63	6.80	6.91	6.87	6.67	6.41	6.16	5.95	5.75	5.53	5.20	4.88
Western Asia	6.15	6.00	5.73	5.36	5.00	4.51	4.03	3.60	3.23	3.02	2.90	2.74	2.61
Western Europe	2.65	2.47	1.96	1.65	1.62	1.57	1.49	1.52	1.59	1.64	1.67	1.69	1.71
