= Demographics of the Isle of Man =

Demographic features of the population of the Isle of Man include population density, ethnicity, level of education, health, economic status, and religious affiliations.

== Vital statistics ==
Year	Average population	Live births	Deaths	Natural change	Crude birth rate	Crude death rate	Natural change
Year	Average population	Live births	Deaths	Natural change	(per 1000)		
1921	52,016	808	759	49	16.5	15.5	-5.1
1934	51,000	664	768	104	13.0	15.1	-2.0
1935	51,000	666	772	106	13.1	15.1	-2.1
1936	51,000	668	807	139	13.1	15.8	-2.7
1937	51,000	644	821	177	12.6	16.1	-3.5
1938							
1939							
1940							
1941							
1942	53,000	883	820	63	16.7	15.5	1.2
1943							
1944							
1945							
1946							
1947							
1948	54,000	821	801	20	15.2	14.8	0.4
1949	54,000	840	790	50	15.6	14.6	0.9
1950	55,000	849	762	87	15.4	13.9	1.6
1951	55,000	837	867	30	15.2	15.8	-0.5
1952	54,000	806	803	3	14.9	14.9	0.1
1953	54,000	719	764	45	13.3	14.1	-0.8
1954	53,000	625	829	204	11.8	15.6	-3.8
1955	52,000	615	772	157	11.8	14.8	-3.0
1956	51,000	632	836	204	12.4	16.4	-4.0
1957	51,000	632	748	116	12.4	14.7	-2.3
1958	50,000	662	735	73	13.2	14.7	-1.5
1959	49,000	641	760	119	13.1	15.5	-2.4
1960	48,000	683	808	125	14.2	16.8	-2.6
1961	47,200	663	859	196	13.8	17.9	-4.1
1962	47,600	675	795	120	14.1	16.6	-2.5
1963	48,000	708	848	140	14.8	17.7	-2.9
1964	48,500	687	768	81	14.3	16.0	-1.7
1965	48,900	712	844	132	14.5	17.2	-2.7
1966	49,300	642	842	200	12.8	16.8	-4.0
1967	50,100	702	867	165	13.7	16.9	-3.2
1968	50,900	686	868	182	13.2	16.7	-3.5
1969	51,700	760	905	145	14.4	17.1	-2.7
1970	52,400	840	909	69	15.6	16.8	-1.3
1971	53,200	804	924	120	14.7	16.9	-2.2
1972	54,700	843	1,056	213	15.1	18.9	-3.8
1973	56,100	807	921	114	14.0	16.0	-2.0
1974	57,600	748	1,079	331	12.7	18.3	-5.6
1975	59,000	692	992	300	11.5	16.5	-5.0
1976	60,500	721	977	256	11.7	15.8	-4.1
1977	61,300	672	1,007	335	10.8	16.2	-5.4
1978	62,200	694	1,038	344	11.1	16.6	-5.5
1979	63,000	758	972	214	12.0	15.4	-3.4
1980	63,800	741	1,015	274	11.7	16.0	-4.3
1981	64,700	752	979	227	11.8	15.4	-3.6
1982	64,600	724	983	259	11.4	15.4	-4.1
1983	64,500	680	943	263	10.7	14.8	-4.1
1984	64,400	666	974	308	10.4	15.3	-4.8
1985	64,400	703	1,045	342	11.2	16.6	-5.4
1986	64,300	709	952	243	11.2	15.1	-3.8
1987	65,400	729	925	196	11.4	14.5	-3.1
1988	66,500	781	991	210	11.7	14.9	-3.1
1989	67,600	817	988	171	12.1	14.6	-2.5
1990	68,700	888	946	58	12.3	13.7	-1.4
1991	69,800	892	982	90	12.8	14.1	-1.3
1992	70,200	858	917	59	12.2	13.1	-0.8
1993	70,600	853	1,011	158	12.1	14.3	-2.2
1994	70,900	883	902	19	12.4	12.7	-0.3
1995	71,300	847	976	129	11.9	13.7	-1.8
1996	71,700	835	945	110	11.6	13.2	-1.5
1997	72,600	870	950	80	12.0	13.1	-1.1
1998	73,600	936	893	43	12.7	12.1	0.6
1999	74,500	894	983	89	12.0	13.2	-1.2
2000	75,400	831	897	66	11.0	11.9	-0.9
2001	76,400	863	955	92	11.3	12.5	-1.2
2002	77,100	903	877	26	11.7	11.4	0.3
2003	77,900	860	852	8	11.0	10.9	0.1
2004	78,600	862	798	64	11.0	10.2	0.8
2005	79,400	901	775	126	11.4	9.8	1.6
2006	80,100	905	768	137	11.3	9.6	1.7
2007	80,800	919	789	130	11.4	9.8	1.6
2008	81,600	979	843	136	12.0	10.3	1.7
2009	82,300	1,015	816	199	12.3	9.9	2.4
2010		1,032	809	223			
2011	84,522	938	816	122			
2012	84,403	890	799	91	10.5	9.4	1.1
2013	84,257	859	792	67	10.0	9.2	0.8
2014	84,052	805	787	18	9.3	9.1	0.2
2015	83,868	785	850	-65	9.0		
2016	83,862	758	852	-94	8.9	10.0	-1.1
2017	84,094	753	837	−84	9.0	10.0	−1.0
2018	84,198	717	903	−186			
2019	84,270	710	850	−140			
2020	84,259	660	938	−278	7.9	11.3	-3.4
2021	84,069	675	899	−224	8.0	10.7	−2.7
2022	84,172	586	903	−317	7.0	10.7	−3.7
2023	84,485	609	876	-267			
2024	84,757	574	925	−351			
2025	84,975	566	909	-343			

=== Structure of the population ===
Population by Sex and Age Group (Census 24.IV.2016):

Age group	Male	Female	Total	%
Total	41 269	42 045	83 314	100
0–4	2 186	1 958	4 144	4.97
5–9	2 436	2 297	4 733	5.68
10–14	2 346	2 123	4 469	5.36
15–19	2 506	2 283	4 789	5.75
20–24	2 252	2 170	4 422	5.31
25–29	2 131	2 195	4 326	5.19
30–34	2 148	2 358	4 506	5.41
35–39	2 371	2 502	4 873	5.85
40–44	2 715	2 897	5 612	6.74
45–49	3 255	3 242	6 497	7.80
50–54	3 359	3 322	6 681	8.02
55–59	2 889	2 998	5 887	7.07
60–64	2 612	2 558	5 170	6.21
65-69	2 715	2 726	5 441	6.53
70-74	2 074	2 138	4 212	5.06
75-79	1 529	1 626	3 155	3.79
80-84	958	1 171	2 129	2.56
85-89	522	858	1 380	1.66
90-94	202	473	675	0.81
95-99	53	135	188	0.23
100+	10	15	25	0.03
Age group	Male	Female	Total	Percent
0–14	6 968	6 378	13 346	16.02
15–64	26 238	26 525	52 763	63.33
65+	8 063	9 142	17 205	20.65

Population by Sex and Age Group (Census 27.I.2021):

Age group	Male	Female	Total	%
Total	41 641	42 428	84 069	100
0–4	1 756	1 727	3 483	4.14
5–9	2 198	2 047	4 245	5.05
10–14	2 449	2 337	4 786	5.69
15–19	2 339	2 109	4 448	5.29
20–24	2 240	2 069	4 309	5.13
25–29	2 208	2 156	4 364	5.19
30–34	2 320	2 421	4 741	5.64
35–39	2 375	2 579	4 954	5.89
40–44	2 590	2 652	5 242	6.24
45–49	2 808	2 990	5 798	6.90
50–54	3 351	3 297	6 648	7.91
55–59	3 389	3 324	6 713	7.99
60–64	2 855	2 914	5 769	6.86
65-69	2 460	2 438	4 898	5.83
70-74	2 526	2 630	5 156	6.13
75-79	1 739	1 932	3 671	4.37
80-84	1 142	1 347	2 489	2.96
85+	896	1 459	2 355	2.80
Age group	Male	Female	Total	Percent
0–14	6 403	6 111	12 514	14.89
15–64	26 475	26 511	52 986	63.03
65+	8 763	9 806	18 569	22.09

== Languages ==
English is spoken by the vast majority of the people. Manx, the language native to the isle, was once considered extinct, as the last native speaker died in 1974. However, in the early 21st century, the Isle of Man has seen a revival of the language: in 1991, about 0.9% of the population spoke Manx, and the same figure has increased to 2.4% by 2021.

Population of the Isle of Man by languages spoken at home, 2021 census
Languages	Number	%
English	80,781	96.09
Polish	504	0.60
Filipino	435	0.52
Bulgarian	376	0.45
Chinese	349	0.42
Portuguese	125	0.15
Afrikaans	99	0.12
Romanian	96	0.11
Spanish	79	0.09
Hungarian	77	0.09
Italian	72	0.09
Others	1,076	1.28
Total	84,069	

Population of the Isle of Man by reported skills in Manx Gaelic
Skill	2001 Census		2011 Census		2021 Census	
Skill	Number	%	Number	%	Number	%
Speak	1,527	2.00	1,662	1.97	2,023	2.41
Read	910	1.19	1,079	1.28	1,174	1.40
Write	706	0.93	796	0.94	783	0.93
All skills					702	0.84
Any skills	1,689	2.21	1,823	2.16	2,223	2.64
Total	76,315		84,497		84,069	
