= List of Arab League countries by population =

This is a list of Arab League countries and territories by population.

== Present ==
Population by Arab League country (top 10)
1. Egypt (23.8%)
2. Sudan (10.4%)
3. Algeria (9.60%)
4. Iraq (9.40%)
5. Yemen (8.20%)
6. Morocco (7.80%)
7. Saudi Arabia (6.70%)
8. Syria (4.90%)
9. Somalia (3.80%)
10. Tunisia (2.50%)
11. Other (12.9%)

Country	Projected population (9 November 2025)	Pct of total	UN Population estimates		Annual growth (Note: Population growth calculation from UN estimates for 2019 and 2020.)		Doubling time (years) (Note: At the current growth rate (halving time for negative numbers).)
Country	Projected population (9 November 2025)	Pct of total	1 July 2023	1 July 2022	Increment	Rate	Doubling time (years)
Egypt	119,190,389	23.63%	114,535,772	112,618,250	1,917,522	1.70%	41
Sudan	51,633,804	10.24%	50,042,791	49,383,346	659,445	1.34%	52
Algeria	47,826,125	9.48%	46,164,219	45,477,389	686,830	1.51%	46
Iraq	47,533,207	9.43%	45,074,049	44,070,551	1,003,498	2.28%	31
Yemen	42,289,804	8.39%	39,390,799	38,222,876	1,167,923	3.06%	23
Morocco	38,632,882	7.66%	37,712,505	37,329,064	383,441	1.03%	68
Saudi Arabia	32,475,114	6.44%	32,264,292	32,175,352	88,940	0.28%	251
Syria	26,498,000	5.25%	23,594,623	22,462,173	1,132,450	5.04%	14
Somalia	19,742,121	3.91%	18,358,615	17,801,897	556,718	3.13%	23
Tunisia	12,393,929	2.46%	12,200,431	12,119,334	81,097	0.67%	104
Jordan	11,882,739	2.36%	11,439,213	11,256,263	182,950	1.63%	43
United Arab Emirates	11,648,843	2.31%	10,642,081	10,242,086	399,995	3.91%	18
Libya	7,502,481	1.49%	7,305,659	7,223,805	81,854	1.13%	62
Lebanon	5,707,632	1.13%	5,733,493	5,744,489	−10,996	−0.19%	−362
Palestine	5,662,561	1.12%	5,409,202	5,305,270	103,932	1.96%	36
Oman	5,889,926	1.17%	5,049,269	4,730,226	319,043	6.74%	11
Mauritania	5,386,570	1.07%	5,022,441	4,875,637	146,804	3.01%	23
Kuwait	5,481,897	1.09%	4,838,782	4,589,511	249,271	5.43%	13
Qatar	3,193,893	0.63%	2,979,082	2,892,455	86,627	2.99%	23
Bahrain	1,658,518	0.33%	1,569,666	1,533,459	36,207	2.36%	30
Djibouti	1,191,217	0.24%	1,152,944	1,137,096	15,848	1.39%	50
Comoros	889,865	0.18%	850,387	834,188	16,199	1.94%	36
Total	504,311,516	100%	481,330,315	472,024,717	9,305,598	1.97%	36

== Past and future ==
Country	1950	2000	2050	2100
Egypt	21,198,000	65,159,000	137,873,000	200,802,000
Algeria	8,893,000	30,639,000	55,445,000	61,060,000
Sudan	6,468,000	27,068,000	89,130,000	165,328,000**
Iraq	5,164,000	23,129,000	76,520,000	133,905,000
Morocco	5,344,000	28,114,000	62,027,000	80,888,000
Saudi Arabia	3,860,000	21,312,000	46,817,000	47,586,000
Yemen	4,778,000	17,236,000	46,081,000	52,244,000
Syria	3,496,000	16,515,000	31,226,000	38,098,000
Tunisia	3,518,000	9,508,000	12,181,000	12,494,000
United Arab Emirates	72,000	2,458,000	8,019,000	13,389,000
Jordan	562,000	4,786,000	11,412,000	14,147,000
Lebanon	1,365,000	3,835,000	5,622,000	5,700,000
Libya	962,000	5,025,000	8,971,000	8,144,000
Palestine	1,018,000	3,111,000	7,770,000	15,516,000
Oman	489,000	2,433,000	5,402,000	5,751,000
Kuwait	145,000	1,973,000	3,864,000	6,484,000
Mauritania	1,006,000	2,501,000	6,537,000	13,059,000
Qatar	26,000	640,000	2,559,000	3,170,000
Bahrain	115,000	655,000	1,848,000	1,602,000
Somalia	5,321,987	15,123,321	20,396,987	35,196,000*
Djibouti	83,000	670,000	1,396,000	1,126,000**
Comoros	149,000	546,000	1,170,000	2,307,000
Total	75,146,000	294,814,000	599,497,000	992,152,000

== See also ==
- Arab world
- Demographics of the Arab world
- List of largest cities in the Arab world
- List of Middle Eastern countries by population
- List of African countries by population
- List of Asian countries by population
- Member states of the Arab League
