= Demographics of the Middle East and North Africa =

Population pyramid of North Africa in 2023

The demographics of the Middle East and North Africa (MENA) region show a highly populated, culturally diverse region spanning three continents. As of 2023, the population was around 501 million. The class, cultural, ethnic, governmental, linguistic and religious make-up of the region is highly variable.

Debates on which countries should be included in the Middle East are wide-ranging. The Greater Middle East and North Africa region can include the Caucasus (Georgia, Armenia and Azerbaijan), Cyprus, Afghanistan and Pakistan due to various social, religious and historic ties. The most commonly accepted countries in the MENA region are included on this page.

== Population by country ==
Population distribution of MENA countries
1. Egypt (17.2%)
2. Iran (14.4%)
3. Turkey (14.1%)
4. Sudan (7.46%)
5. Iraq (6.96%)
6. Algeria (6.79%)
7. Morocco (5.94%)
8. Other (27.1%)

The most populous country in the MENA region is Egypt with nearly 100 million people, accounting for approximately 17% of the total. The least populous country is Djibouti with a population of almost 0.9 million, accounting for about 0.15% of the total. The largest country in land area is Algeria at 2,381,740 km^{2}. The smallest country in land area is the Gaza Strip at 360 km^{2}. The average population density for the MENA region is about 39 people per square kilometer. The highest population density is in the Gaza Strip, with about 5,102 people per square kilometer. The lowest population density is in Mauritania, with 3.73 people per square kilometer.

Country	Population		Area		Population density/km^{2}
Country	Number	% of total MENA	km^{2}	% of total MENA	Population density/km^{2}
Algeria	44,700,000	6.79%	2,381,740	15.93%	17.49
Bahrain	1,442,659	0.25%	760	0.01%	1,898.24
Djibouti	1,066,809	0.15%	23,200	0.16%	38.10
Egypt	107,770,524	17.20%	1,001,450	6.70%	99.27
Eritrea	6,700,000		117,600		56.97
Gaza	1,836,713	0.32%	360	0.00%	5,101.98
Iran	86,758,304	14.37%	1,648,195	11.02%	50.37
Iraq	40,194,216	6.96%	438,317	2.93%	91.70
Israel	8,424,904	1.46%	20,770	0.14%	405.63
Jordan	10,458,413	1.81%	89,342	0.60%	117.06
Kuwait	4,277,304	0.73%	17,818	0.12%	240.06
Lebanon	6,100,075	1.06%	10,400	0.07%	586.55
Libya	6,754,507	1.17%	1,759,540	11.77%	3.84
Mauritania	3,840,429	0.66%	1,030,700	6.89%	3.73
Morocco	34,314,130	5.94%	446,550	2.99%	76.84
Oman	4,613,241	0.80%	309,550	2.07%	14.90
Qatar	2,363,569	0.41%	11,586	0.08%	204.00
Saudi Arabia	33,091,113	5.73%	2,149,690	13.52%	15.39
Somalia	17,066,000		637,657		27.2
South Sudan	11,544,905		644,329		13.33
Sudan	47,958,856	7.46%	1,861,484	12.45%	23.16
Syria	26,019,711	3.37%	185,180	1.24%	105.06
Tunisia	11,516,189	1.99%	163,610	1.09%	70.39
Turkey	84,680,273	14.06%	783,562	5.24%	103.70
United Arab Emirates	9,701,315	1.68%	83,600	0.56%	116.04
West Bank	2,798,494	0.48%	5,860	0.04%	477.56
Yemen	30,667,230	4.96%	527,968	3.53%	54.30
Total	599,676,643	100%	16,546,112	100%	39.91

== Population shifts ==
The MENA region's population is growing at an average rate of 1.56%. This is well above the global rate of 1.1% population growth. High rates of migration, high birth rates, higher life expectancy and lower infant mortality rates contribute to higher populations.

Country	Population	Population Growth Rate	Births /1000 pop.	Net migration rate /1000 pop.	Median Age
Algeria	41,657,488	1.63%	21.5	-0.9	28.3
Bahrain	1,442,659	2.19%	13.1	11.6	32.5
Djibouti	884,017	2.13%	23.3	5.5	24.2
Egypt	99,413,317	2.38%	28.8	-0.4	23.9
Gaza	1,836,713	2.25%	30.5	-5	17.4
Iran	83,024,745	1.19%	17.4	-0.2	30.8
Iraq	40,194,216	2.50%	30	-1.1	20.2
Israel	8,424,904	1.49%	17.9	2.1	30.1
Jordan	10,458,413	2.02%	23.6	0	22.8
Kuwait	2,916,467	1.38%	18.8	-2.8	29.4
Lebanon	6,100,075	-3.13%	14.4	-40.3	31.3
Libya	6,754,507	1.45%	17.2	0.9	29.4
Mauritania	3,840,429	2.14%	29.9	-0.8	20.7
Morocco	34,314,130	0.95%	17.5	-3.1	29.7
Oman	4,613,241	2.00%	23.7	-0.4	25.8
Qatar	2,363,569	1.95%	9.5	11.5	33.4
Saudi Arabia	33,091,113	1.63%	15.6	4.1	29.9
Sudan	43,120,843	2.93%	34.2	1.9	17.9
Syria	19,454,263	n/a	20.7	n/a	24.5
Tunisia	11,516,189	0.95%	17.4	-1.6	32
Turkey	81,257,239	0.49%	15.4	-4.5	31.4
United Arab Emirates	9,701,315	1.44%	9.8	6.3	37.2
West Bank	2,798,494	1.81%	26	-4.4	21.4
Yemen	28,667,230	2.17%	27.6	0.1	19.8
Total	577,845,576	1.56%	20.98	1.48	26.83

=== Migration ===
Migration rates to, from and between the MENA region are high. On average there are 1.5 migrants per 1000 in the population. This accounts for net immigration and emigration rates. The highest net immigration is in Bahrain with 11.6 immigrants per 1000 of the population. The highest net emigration is in Lebanon with 40.3 emigrants per 1000 of the population. In other words, more people are leaving Lebanon than are coming in. Migration in the Middle East has been shaped by various events and phenomena including, but not limited to, the following:

- The Israel-Palestine conflict
- The Syrian Civil War
- The Iraq War
- The Algerian Civil War (See Algerians in France)
- Post-colonial relationships
- Job prospects in oil rich states
- Political repression
- Human rights violations

Most MENA migrants go to Europe (See Immigration to Europe) or to other MENA states. There are also large populations from sub-Saharan Africa in North Africa and from South and Southeast Asia in Persian Gulf region.

=== Youth ===
The MENA region is characterized with a young average population age. The median age across the MENA region is 26.8 years old. The younger generation is growing, creating an age bulge and high rates of youth unemployment. This has also led to a brain drain, involving young and educated people leaving their home country for better job prospects in other countries.

== Most populous areas ==
The Middle East and North Africa have an average annual growth rate of 1.56% and has one of the world's most rapidly expanding populations. Urban areas have been at the center of this growth, as the urban share of the total population in the region grew from 48% in the 1980s and 60% in 2000. In 2015 it was expected to exceed 70% whereas the average growth of developing countries in 2015 was 54%. The only region which exceeds MENA's average annual growth of 4% in sub-Saharan Africa which is not as urbanized as MENA. The regions average growth per capita was 0.9% between 1980 and 2000. The growth in the region did become better after 2000 mainly because of the rise in oil prices. The growth in the MENA region did not happen under ideal circumstances, but instead it occurred during economic decline and struggle. Poverty and vulnerability are also affecting the growing urban population and in the 1990s, 20 million people were living with an income under US$2/day. This happened during a period of rapid growth but did not see any reduction in the regions poverty levels.

== Economy ==
Middle Eastern and North African economy are highly dependent and centralized around natural resources within the country. Countries in the region face different challenges depending on the commodity they have. The categorization cannot explain all the different challenges the countries face but is highly useful to categorize countries based on similar challenges.

The three categories are: Firstly, countries with a high population and low natural resources (RPLA countries), secondly, countries with a high population and high oil wealth (RRLA countries) and thirdly, countries with a high indigenous population and high oil deposits (RRLP countries). This categorization cannot be used to explain every social and political challenge faced in the region, instead, these similar challenges and constraints are used to classified the countries. Furthermore, this categorization can be used to understand development within the region. A more detailed classification of each country, their GDP, GDP per capita and oil rent can be found in the GDP table.

As can be seen on the world map the Middle East and North Africa have large reserves of gas and other natural resources.

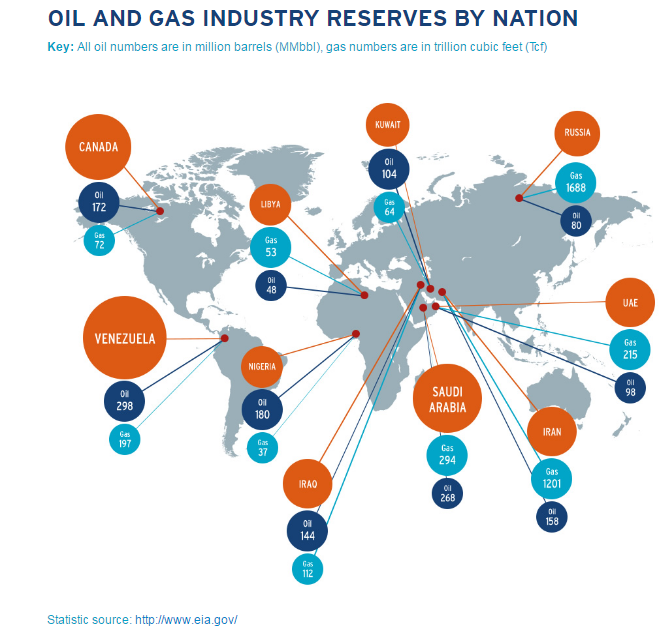

== Education ==
The Middle East and North Africa have strongly developed their education in terms of the average level of schooling, which has quadrupled since the 1960s. They have also halved the illiteracy rate in the region since the 1980s and achieved complete gender parity in primary school. Literacy in the region for adults has improved from 59% in the 1990s to 78% in 2010.

The access and enrollment in the school system have also increased in the region and all boys and girls have had access to primary education in most of the countries in the region. Enrollment in schools has increased from 86% to 94% between 2000 and 2010. It is interesting to note that the region, differently from the rest of the world, has had a reversed gender gap meaning that girls are outperforming boys in 4th-grade math and this is systematic up until the 8th grade.

Even though the region and the countries are highly invested in developing the school system and education by investing 5.3% of the GDP in the education the quality is still low and lacking and needs to be improved (can be seen on the table). There is also a difference in education and a large gap between the rich and the poor. Furthermore, the political instability in the region and the conflicts are forcing children to drop out of school. Still, school dropouts have significantly decreased in the region.

== Languages ==
The five major languages in the Middle East and North Africa are: Arabic, Hebrew, Persian, Turkish and Kurdish. There are approximately 571 million speakers of the five languages including individuals speaking the language outside of the Middle East and North Africa.

Arabic is spoken in the following countries: Algeria, Bahrain, Djibouti, Egypt, Palestine, Iraq, Israel, Jordan, Kuwait, Lebanon, Libya, Mauritania, Morocco, Oman, Qatar, Saudi Arabia, Sudan, Syria, Tunisia, United Arab Emirates, and Yemen.

Hebrew is spoken in Israel.

Persian is spoken in Iran.

Turkish is spoken in Turkey.

Kurdish is spoken in parts of Turkey, Syria, Iraq and Iran.

Syriac (Neo-Aramaic) is spoken in Iraq, Iraq, Syria and Turkey.

== Religion ==
The MENA region is home to the three main monotheistic religions: Judaism, Christianity, and Islam. Diversity in a single religion and sectarian splits have contributed to various group identities and minorities. Approximately 325 million Muslims live in the MENA region, which constitutes 20% of the global Muslim population. However, it also has the highest percentage of Muslim-majority countries. By 2010 it was estimated that 93% of the populations in the Middle East and North Africa were Muslim, although this information can vary from the availability of the sources each country provides. Even with a majority Muslim population, diverse states in the region do not proclaim Islam as the official religion. The Islamic Republic of Iran, the Islamic Republic of Afghanistan and the Islamic Republic of Pakistan, are the only countries that include religion in their formal titles.

The main division within Islam is between the Sunni and Shia sects. 80% of Muslims in the MENA region are Sunnis, being the majority group, however, their practices and interpretations of religious mandates can differ from country to country. Between 36 million and 44 million Shi’as live in the Arab region. Of the Shi'a sects, the most prominent group is the Twelvers. Minority groups are the Ismailis, Zaidis, Alevis and Alawites. Iran is home of 70 million Shi'as, which constitutes 40% of the world's total Shi’a population. Iraq counts with 12% of Shi’a worldwide population; other countries with 1 million or more of the Shi’a population are Turkey, Syria, Yemen, Saudi Arabia, and Lebanon. Groups such as the Druze and Kharijites are difficult to classify as strictly Sunni or Shi’a. Another main commonality in both Sunni and Shi’i groups is Sufism. Sufi practices have reached other African and Asian countries.

Israel is home of 5.8 million Jews. However, the Jewish population has decreased significantly in Egypt, Iraq, Morocco, Tunisia, Libya, and Syria. In Turkey and Iran, Jewish communities reach around twenty thousand each, but without significant influence. Christians groups such as the Orthodox, Roman Catholic and Protestants are spread throughout the region. In Egypt, Copts are the major Christian group, represent approximately 10% of the national population and are the largest Christian group in the region. Syria has a similar percentage of Christians. In Lebanon, the Maronite Christian make up 21% of the population. In Bahrain, Jordan, Libya, Oman, and Yemen, other minority religious groups that can be found are Hindus and Buddhists.

From 2010 to 2050, the Muslim population in the MENA countries is expected to grow 74%, from 317 million to 552 million. Muslims will remain the majority group in the region, while Christians and Jews will remain as the second and third largest groups respectively. Buddhists and Hindus are expected to double their size by 2050.

Fertility rates in the MENA region are always high. This differs among religious groups. Between 2010 and 2015 the fertility rate of Muslim women was 3 children per woman, followed by Jewish women with a rate of 2.8. In the case of the Christian women, their rate is lower than Muslims however there is no conclusive and specific data across the region. Overall, youth constitutes the largest population of the countries in the region. In 2010, the most prominent age range found was between 15 and 59 for the three main religious groups. For Muslims the median age is 23 years old, representing the youngest religious groups. By contrast, the median age for the Jewish population is 32, being the oldest religious group. Based on these projections, equal access to quality education and an increase in the number of job seekers are part of the challenges the governments currently face. The wealthy Gulf Cooperation Countries ( GCC): Bahrain, Kuwait, Oman, Qatar, Saudi Arabia, and the United Arab Emirates, tend to have higher access to literacy rates than lower-income countries, such as Egypt, Iraq, and Morocco. Concerning labor migration flows, the Gulf Cooperation Countries are expected to increase the number of foreign workers from India, Egypt, Pakistan, Bangladesh, the Philippines, and Sri Lanka. Due to these flows, by 2050 is expected the population of Hindus and Buddhist will be doubled. Christians are also expected to increase, while Muslims and Jewish populations are expected to remain without significant changes.

The following map shows the percentage of the population in each area which is Islamic.

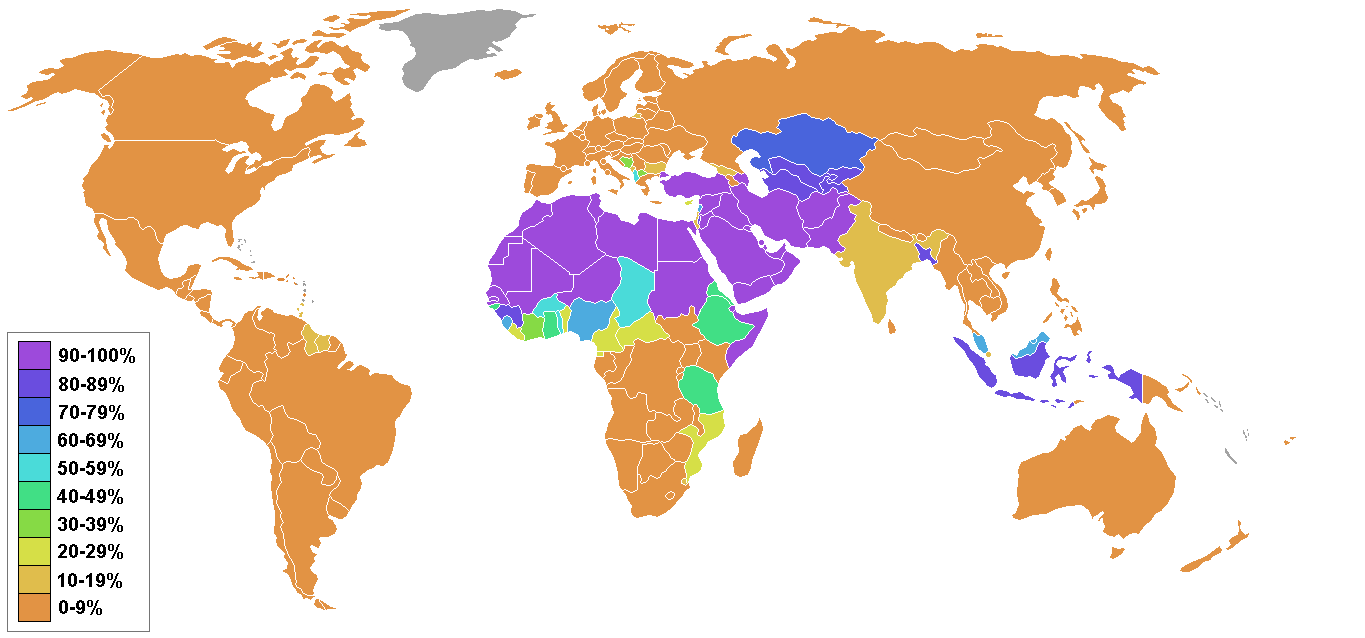
Islam population worldwide

== Ethnic composition ==
The MENA region is highly diverse and is home to many different ethnic and identity groups. Five of the largest ethnic groups in the region; Arabs, Azerbaijanis, Kurds, Persians, and Turks.

Other groups include: Arameans, Armenians, Assyrians, Balochs, Berbers, Copts, Druze, Georgians, Gilaks, Greeks, Jews, Kawliya, Lurs, Mandeans, Mazanderanis, Mhallami, Nawar, Nubians, Samaritans, Shabaks, Talishis, Tats, Turcomans, Yazidis, and Zazas.

== Human Development Index ==
The Human Development Index is a statistical indicator to obtain the average of human development in each country created by the United Nations Development Programme (UNDP). Three main dimensions are measured: Health, education, and standard of living. These dimensions are valued based on life expectancy at birth, schooling years and gross national income per capita. The 2018 Human Development Index of the Middle East and North Africa region countries range from Low to Very High category. The MENA region includes the richest oil countries in the world and the poorest such as Yemen and Djibouti. The last places of HDI in the MENA region are Sudan, Djibouti, and Yemen. Data about Palestine is not included in the HDI ranking. The table below shows the MENA countries according to their Human Development Index scores in 2018:

HDI ranking within MENA	Country	HDI	Life expectancy at birth	Expected years of schooling	Mean years of schooling	GNI per capita	HDI ranking (world)
1	Israel	0.919	82.6	16	12.8	42,700	19
2	United Arab Emirates	0.890	76.1	13.6	10.8	70,430	31
3	Saudi Arabia	0.854	74.3	16.1	9.6	49,520	40
4	Bahrain	0.852	75.8	14.5	9.4	44,250	42
5	Qatar	0.848	77.2	13.4	9.8	91,670	45
6	Turkey	0.820	78.6	14.6	7.9	27,660	54
7	Oman	0.813	77.3	13.7	8.1	26,210	60
8	Kuwait	0.806	74.8	13.3	7.3	58,550	64
9	Iran	0.783	76.2	14.8	8.8	12,950	70
10	Algeria	0.748	76.3	14.4	7.8	11,720	91
11	Lebanon	0.744	79.8	13.3	8.6	14,920	92
12	Tunisia	0.740	75.9	15.1	7.2	10,850	95
13	Jordan	0.729	74.5	13.1	10.1	10,520	102
14	Libya	0.724	72.1	13.4	7.3	16,130	105
15	Egypt	0.707	71.7	13.1	7.2	11,840	116
16	Morocco	0.686	76.1	12.1	5	7,680	121
17	Iraq	0.674	70	10.1	6.6	11,310	123
18	Syria	0.567	71	9	5.1	2,337	151
19	Mauritania	0.546	63.4	8.5	4.3	5,360	157
20	Djibouti	0.524	62.6	6.2	4.1	5,620	166
21	Sudan	0.510	64.7	7.2	3.5	3,990	170
22	Yemen	0.470	65.2	9	3	3,520	179

Israel and the Persian Gulf countries are the highest countries ranked in the region, classified as Very High Human Development. The three main countries with a notorious sudden decline in the HDI ranking were Syria, Libya, and Yemen. The ongoing conflicts and violence had caused them to fall an average of 24 places in the worldwide ranking. Lebanon, not involved directly in a violent conflict, has been affected by the increasing waves of refugees coming from Syria. Compared to other regions, the Middle East has a higher income per capita than Latin America and sub-Saharan Africa, but it does not exceed East Asia or South Asia. Concerning the literacy rates, the Middle East is far behind Latin America and East Asia, and it is positioned ahead of Sub-Saharan Africa and South Asia. Other features not included in the HDI report to take into account for measuring development in the MENA region are the political regimes, national and international economic policies, accountability and the consequences of internal and regional conflicts.

== See also ==
- Demographics of the Arab League
- Demographics of the Middle East
- Genetic history of the Middle East
- Genetic history of North Africa

Demographics of MENA countries

- Algeria
- Bahrain
- Djibouti
- Egypt
- Gaza
- Iran
- Iraq
- Israel
- Jordan
- Kuwait
- Lebanon
- Libya
- Mauritania
- Morocco
- Oman
- Qatar
- Saudi Arabia
- Sudan
- Syria
- Tunisia
- Turkey
- United Arab Emirates
- West Bank
- Yemen
