= Demographics of the Middle East =

Populations of the Middle East

The Demographics of the Middle East describes populations of the Middle East, a region covering western and northern parts of the Asian and African continents respectively.

== Overview ==
Population growth
| # | | 1990 | 2008 | 2010 | 1990–2008 | 2016 | Growth % |
| | | Million | | | | 1990–2008 | 1990–2010 |
|---|---|---|---|---|---|---|---|
| 1 | Bahrain | 0.49 | 0.77 | 1.26 | 0.3 | 56% | 157% |
| 2 | Cyprus | 0.58 | 0.80 | 0.80 | 0.2 | 38% | 38% |
| 3 | Egypt | 57.79 | 81.53 | 81.12 | 23.7 | 41% | 40% |
| 6 | Iran | 54.40 | 71.96 | 73.97 | 17.6 | 32% | 36% |
| 5 | Iraq | 18.14 | 28.22 | 32.32 | 10.1 | 56% | 78% |
| 6 | Israel | 4.68 | 7.31 | 7.62 | 2.6 | 56% | 63% |
| 7 | Jordan | 3.17 | 5.91 | 6.05 | 2.7 | 86% | 91% |
| 8 | Kuwait | 2.13 | 2.73 | 2.74 | 0.6 | 28% | 29% |
| 9 | Lebanon | 2.97 | 4.14 | 4.23 | 1.2 | 39% | 42% |
| 10 | Oman | 1.84 | 2.79 | 2.78 | 0.9 | 51% | 51% |
| 11 | Palestine | 1.90 | 3.91 | 4.12 | 2.0 | 106% | 117% |
| 12 | Qatar | 0.47 | 1.28 | 1.76 | 0.8 | 174% | 274% |
| 13 | Saudi Arabia | 16.38 | 24.65 | 27.45 | 8.3 | 50% | 68% |
| 14 | Syria | 12.72 | 21.23 | 20.45 | 8.5 | 67% | 61% |
| 15 | Turkey | 55.12 | 71.08 | 72.85 | 16.0 | 29% | 32% |
| 16 | UAE | 1.87 | 4.37 | 7.51 | 2.5 | 134% | 302% |
| 17 | Yemen | 12.31 | 23.05 | 24.05 | 10.7 | 87% | 95% |
| x | Total | 246.96 | 355.73 | 371.08 | 66.9 | 51 % | 61% |
| x | World | 5,265.2 | 6,687.9 | 6,825 | 1,422.7 | 27 % | 30% |
Source: OECD/World Bank

Encyclopedia Britannica definition of Middle East

Encyclopedia Britannica stated in 2018 that "by the mid-20th century a common definition of the Middle East encompassed the states or territories of Turkey, Cyprus, Syria, Lebanon, Iraq, Iran, Israel, Palestine, Jordan, Egypt, Sudan, Libya, and the various states and territories of Arabia proper (Saudi Arabia, Kuwait, Yemen, Oman, Bahrain, Qatar, and the Trucial States, or Trucial Oman [now United Arab Emirates])."

== Life expectancy ==
List of countries by life expectancy at birth for 2023 according to the World Bank Group:

World Bank Group (2023)
| Countries and territories | 2023 | | | | Historical data | | | | | | | | | | | recovery from COVID-19: 2019→2023 |
| Countries and territories | All | Male | Female | Sex gap | 2014 | 2014 →2019 | 2019 | 2019 →2020 | 2020 | 2020 →2021 | 2021 | 2021 →2022 | 2022 | 2022 →2023 | 2023 | recovery from COVID-19: 2019→2023 |
|---|---|---|---|---|---|---|---|---|---|---|---|---|---|---|---|---|
| Israel | 83.20 | 81.00 | 85.50 | 4.50 | 82.15 | 0.65 | 82.80 | −0.16 | 82.65 | −0.15 | 82.50 | 0.20 | 82.70 | 0.50 | 83.20 | 0.39 |
| Kuwait | 83.19 | 82.70 | 83.70 | 1.00 | 79.08 | 2.89 | 81.97 | −3.21 | 78.76 | −0.02 | 78.74 | 1.85 | 80.59 | 2.60 | 83.19 | 1.22 |
| United Arab Emirates | 82.91 | 81.98 | 84.20 | 2.23 | 81.99 | 0.61 | 82.60 | −0.66 | 81.94 | −2.85 | 79.08 | 1.40 | 80.49 | 2.42 | 82.91 | 0.31 |
| Qatar | 82.37 | 81.61 | 83.37 | 1.76 | 81.39 | 1.55 | 82.94 | −2.54 | 80.41 | 0.67 | 81.08 | 0.77 | 81.86 | 0.51 | 82.37 | −0.58 |
| Cyprus | 81.65 | 79.64 | 83.67 | 4.03 | 81.34 | 0.12 | 81.45 | −0.22 | 81.23 | −0.66 | 80.57 | −0.14 | 80.43 | 1.21 | 81.65 | 0.19 |
| Bahrain | 81.28 | 80.67 | 81.99 | 1.31 | 80.21 | 0.26 | 80.47 | −1.79 | 78.68 | −0.60 | 78.08 | 2.91 | 80.99 | 0.29 | 81.28 | 0.81 |
| Oman | 80.03 | 78.49 | 81.88 | 3.39 | 79.03 | 0.92 | 79.95 | −2.18 | 77.76 | −1.79 | 75.97 | 1.94 | 77.91 | 2.12 | 80.03 | 0.09 |
| Saudi Arabia | 78.73 | 77.10 | 81.16 | 4.06 | 77.12 | 1.20 | 78.31 | −0.72 | 77.60 | −0.51 | 77.09 | 0.22 | 77.31 | 1.42 | 78.73 | 0.42 |
| Lebanon | 77.82 | 75.74 | 79.73 | 3.99 | 78.15 | 0.06 | 78.21 | −1.91 | 76.30 | −2.65 | 73.65 | 4.35 | 78.00 | −0.19 | 77.82 | −0.39 |
| Jordan | 77.81 | 75.71 | 80.19 | 4.48 | 74.61 | 2.26 | 76.86 | −1.28 | 75.58 | −1.38 | 74.20 | 2.88 | 77.09 | 0.73 | 77.81 | 0.95 |
| Iran | 77.65 | 75.79 | 79.63 | 3.84 | 75.64 | 1.22 | 76.86 | −2.71 | 74.14 | −0.39 | 73.75 | 3.05 | 76.80 | 0.85 | 77.65 | 0.80 |
| Turkey | 77.16 | 74.53 | 79.86 | 5.33 | 76.45 | 1.28 | 77.74 | −1.21 | 76.53 | −0.80 | 75.72 | 1.87 | 77.59 | −0.43 | 77.16 | −0.58 |
| World | 73.33 | 70.95 | 75.84 | 4.89 | 71.78 | 1.09 | 72.87 | −0.68 | 72.18 | −0.97 | 71.22 | 1.75 | 72.97 | 0.36 | 73.33 | 0.46 |
| Iraq | 72.32 | 70.43 | 74.06 | 3.63 | 69.68 | 1.57 | 71.25 | −1.59 | 69.65 | 1.05 | 70.70 | 1.33 | 72.04 | 0.29 | 72.32 | 1.08 |
| Syria | 72.12 | 69.83 | 74.41 | 4.58 | 65.49 | 5.48 | 70.97 | 0.97 | 71.94 | 0.47 | 72.42 | 0.37 | 72.79 | −0.67 | 72.12 | 1.15 |
| Egypt | 71.63 | 69.49 | 73.81 | 4.32 | 69.91 | 1.30 | 71.21 | −1.42 | 69.79 | −0.81 | 68.98 | 2.03 | 71.01 | 0.62 | 71.63 | 0.42 |
| Yemen | 69.30 | 67.23 | 71.39 | 4.15 | 68.00 | −1.44 | 66.57 | −0.13 | 66.44 | −0.42 | 66.02 | 1.93 | 67.95 | 1.34 | 69.30 | 2.73 |
| Palestine | 65.17 | 59.69 | 71.50 | 11.81 | 72.78 | 3.03 | 75.81 | −0.81 | 75.00 | −1.11 | 73.89 | 2.77 | 76.66 | −11.49 | 65.17 | −10.64 |

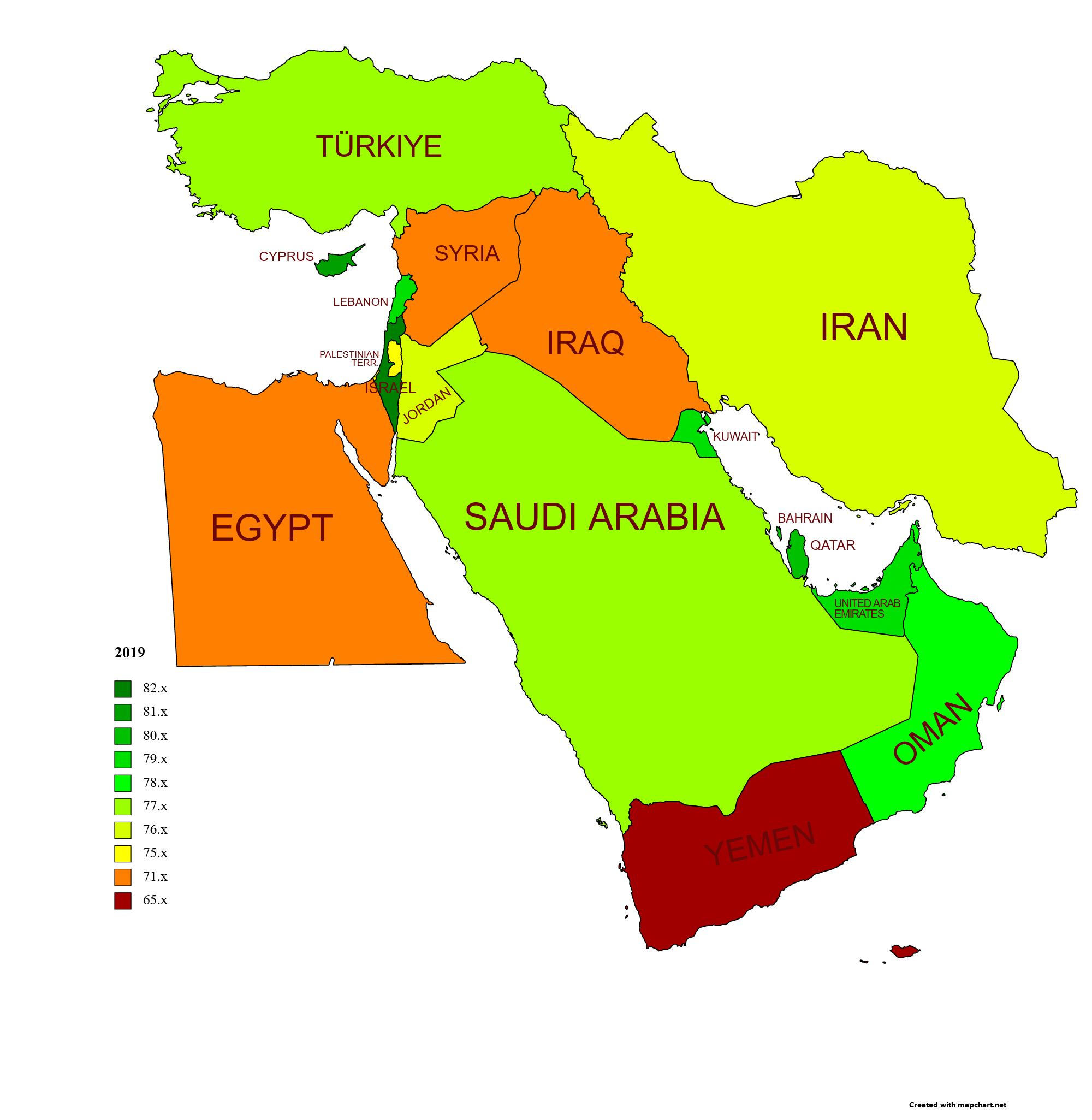
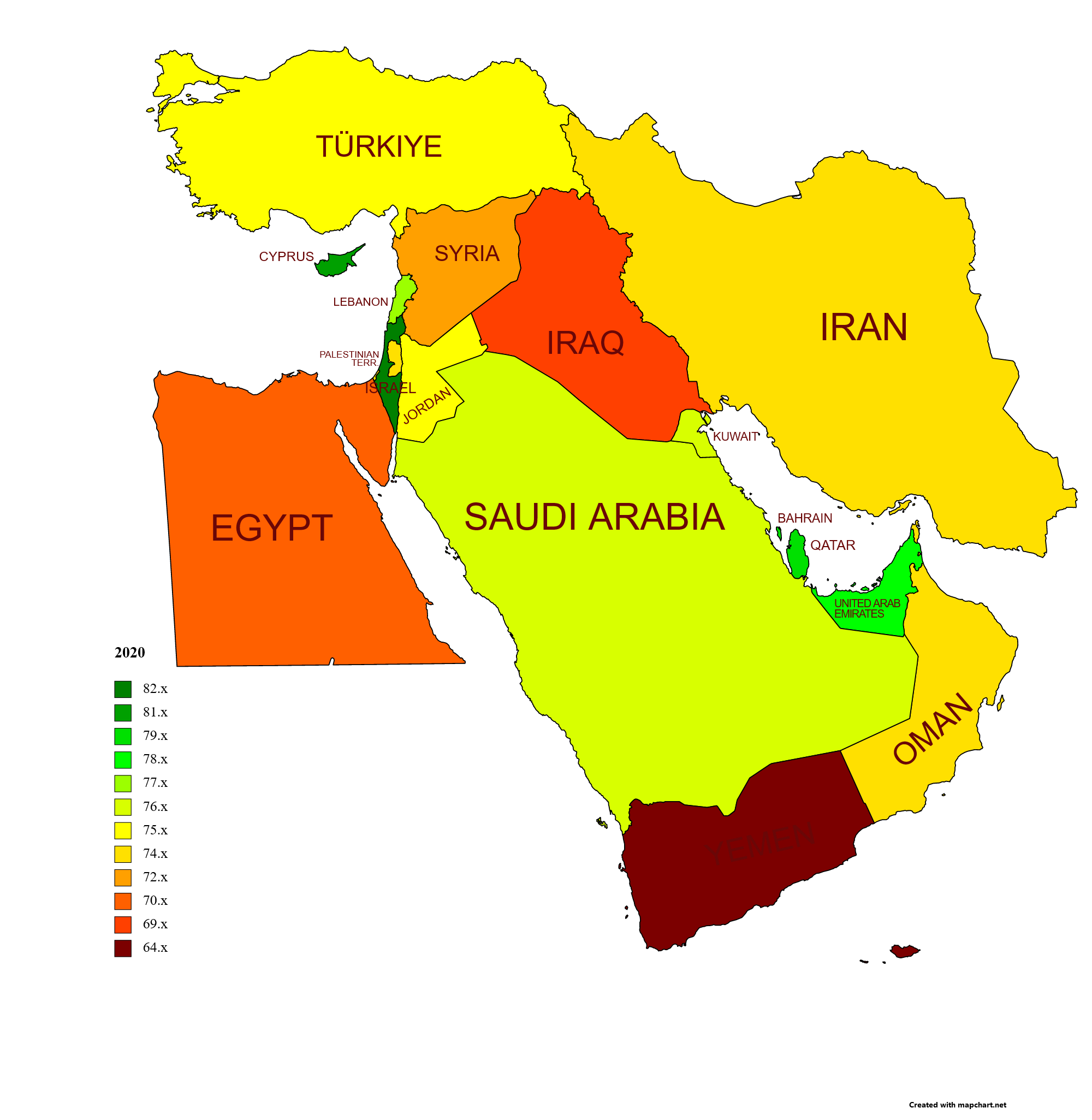
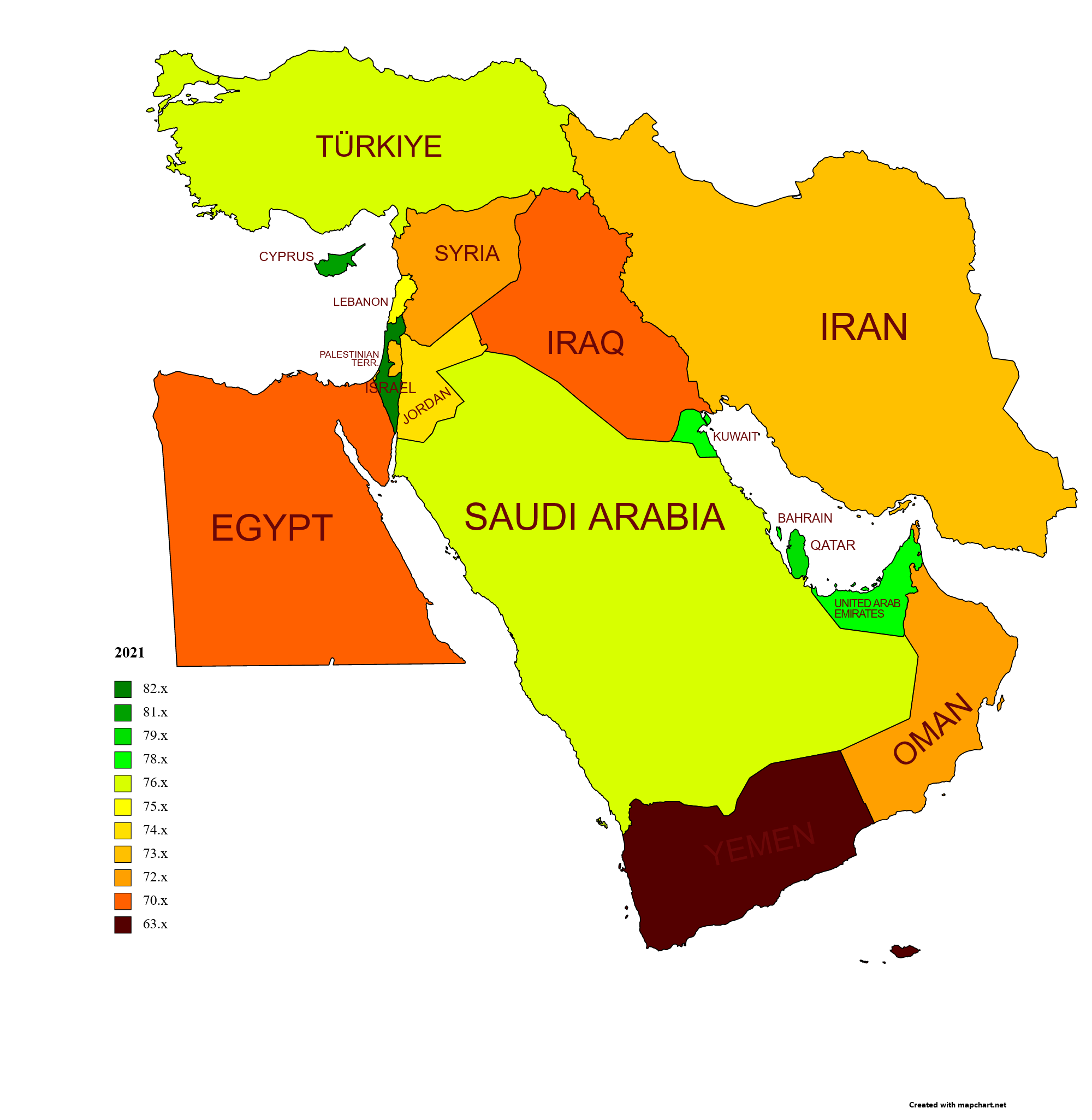
Change in life expectancy in the Middle East from 2019 to 2021

== Historical ==
In the year 1600, the population of the Middle East stood at about 18.5 million. Within modern borders:

- Anatolia - c. 6,500,000
- Iran - 4,472,000
- Yemen - 2,243,000
- Saudi Arabia - 1,809,000
- Syria - 1,175,000
- Iraq - 1,000,000
- Lebanon - 292,000
- Oman - 275,000
- Jordan - 191,000
- Palestine- 161,000
- Cyprus - 98,000
- Kuwait - 71,000
- Bahrain - 54,000
- United Arab Emirates - 35,000

In addition, the population of North Africa was 12 million, with the following breakdown within borders:

- Egypt - 5,000,000
- Algeria - 2,250,000
- Morocco - 2,250,000
- Tunisia - 2,000,000
- Libya - 500,000

== See also ==
- Demographics of the Arab League
- Demographics of the Middle East and North Africa
- Ethnic groups in the Middle East
- Genetic history of the Middle East
- Largest metropolitan areas of the Middle East
- List of Middle Eastern countries by population
