= Greater Middle East =

Term used in American foreign policy since 2004

- Variations on definitions of the Middle East and North Africa region Traditional definition of the Middle East Greater Middle East (2004 U.S. Government paper) Areas pundits sometimes associated with Middle East c. 2004
- Countries: UN members (36) and UN observer (1): Core area; Middle East; Bahrain; Cyprus; Egypt; Iran; Iraq; Israel; Jordan; Kuwait; Lebanon; Oman; Palestine; Qatar; Saudi Arabia; Syria; Turkey; United Arab Emirates; Yemen; Marginal area; North Africa; Algeria; Libya; Morocco; Sudan; Tunisia; East Africa; Comoros; Djibouti; Somalia; South Asia; Afghanistan; Pakistan; West Africa; Mauritania; Peripheral area; Caucasus; Armenia; Azerbaijan; Georgia; Central Asia; Kazakhstan; Kyrgyzstan; Tajikistan; Turkmenistan; Uzbekistan; States with limited recognition (5): Core area; Middle East; Northern Cyprus; Marginal area; East Africa; Somaliland; North Africa; Sahrawi Arab Democratic Republic; Peripheral area; Caucasus; Abkhazia; South Ossetia
- Dependencies: External (1): Core area; Middle East; Akrotiri and Dhekelia (United Kingdom); Internal (5): Core area; Middle East; Kurdistan Region (Iraq); Peripheral area; Caucasus; Adjara (Georgia); Nakhchivan (Azerbaijan); Central Asia; Gorno-Badakhshan (Tajikistan); Karakalpakstan (Uzbekistan); Occupied (5): Core area; Middle East; East Jerusalem; Gaza Strip; Golan Heights; West Bank; Marginal area; North Africa; Western Sahara; UN buffers (2): Core area; Middle East; UNBZC; UNDOF Zone
- Largest cities: 8 largest cities in the Greater Middle East (2022): # (Egypt) Cairo; 1. (Turkey) Istanbul; 2. (Iran) Tehran; 3. (Saudi Arabia) Riyadh; 4. (Iraq) Baghdad; 5. (Sudan) Khartoum; 6. (Egypt) Alexandria; 7. (Turkey) Ankara

The Greater Middle East is a geopolitical term introduced in March 2004 in a paper published by the Carnegie Endowment for International Peace as part of the United States' preparatory work for the Group of Eight summit of June 2004. The paper presented a proposal for sweeping change in the way the West deals with the Middle East and North Africa. It also denotes a vaguely defined region encompassing the Arab world, along with Afghanistan, Pakistan, Iran, Turkey, Israel, Palestine, Cyprus, and sometimes the Caucasus and Central Asia.

Adam Garfinkle of the Foreign Policy Research Institute defined the Greater Middle East as the MENA region together with the Caucasus and Central Asia.

The future of the Greater Middle East has sometimes been referred to as the "new Middle East", first so by US Secretary of State Condoleezza Rice, who presented the second-term Bush administration's vision for the region's future in June 2006 in Dubai. Rice said it would be achieved through "constructive chaos", a phrase she repeated a few weeks later during a joint press conference with Israeli prime minister Ehud Olmert when the 2006 Lebanon War had broken out; the meaning of this phrase and the Bush administration's vision have been much debated since. The efforts to achieve this new Middle East are sometimes called "The Great Middle East Project".

Former US National Security Advisor Zbigniew Brzezinski stated that a "political awakening" is taking place in this region which may be an indicator of the multipolar world that is now developing. He alluded to the Greater Middle East as the "Global Balkans", and as a control lever on an area he refers to as Eurasia. According to Andrew Bacevich's 2016 book America's War for the Greater Middle East, this region is the theater for a series of conflicts dating back to 1980, which heralded the start of the Iran–Iraq War.

== See also ==
- Middle East and North Africa (MENA)
  - Middle East / Near East / West Asia
  - North Africa
  - Demographics of the Middle East and North Africa
- Caucasus
- Central Asia
- Arab world
- Muslim world
- Indo-Mediterranean
- Great Game
- Sykes–Picot Agreement
