= List of largest cities in the Arab world =

This is a list of largest cities with a population of at least 1 million in the Arab world. The Arab world is here defined as the 22 member states of the Arab League.

== Largest cities ==
Largest cities in the Arab world by population:

Rank	Country	City	Population	Founding date	Image
1	Egypt	Cairo	23,200,000	968 CE	
2	Iraq	Baghdad	8,000,000	762 CE	
3	Saudi Arabia	Riyadh	7,900,000	1746 CE	
4	Sudan	Khartoum	7,400,000	1824 CE	
5	United Arab Emirates	Dubai	6,650,000	1833 CE	
6	Egypt	Alexandria	6,350,000	332 BCE	
7	Jordan	Amman	6,300,000	7250 BCE	
8	Kuwait	Kuwait City	4,825,000	1613 CE	
9	Morocco	Casablanca	4,500,000	7th century	
10	Algeria	Algiers	4,400,000	944 CE	
11	Syria	Damascus	4,050,000	~8,000–10,000 BCE	
12	Saudi Arabia	Jeddah	4,000,000	522 BCE	
13	Yemen	Sanaa	3,400,000	~500 BCE (possibly earlier)	
14	Saudi Arabia	Dammam	3,000,000	1923	
15	Tunisia	Tunis	2,775,000	814 BCE	
16	Saudi Arabia	Mecca	2,775,000	2nd century CE	
17	Qatar	Doha	2,700,000	1823 CE	
18	Somalia	Mogadishu	2,325,000	10th Century	
19	Morocco	Rabat	2,150,000	10th century	
20	Syria	Aleppo	2,025,000	~5,000 BCE	
21	Palestine	Gaza City	1,990,000	15th century BC	
22	Lebanon	Beirut	1,970,000	~3000 BCE (outer estimate)	
23	United Arab Emirates	Abu Dhabi	1,960,000	1761 CE	
24	Libya	Tripoli	1,930,000	7th century BC	
25	Iraq	Basra	1,750,000	636 AD	
26	Oman	Muscat	1,700,000	550 BCE	
27	Algeria	Oran	1,670,000	AD 944	
28	Bahrain	Manama	1,580,000	1345 or earlier	
29	Iraq	Mosul	1,580,000	~700 BCE	
30	Saudi Arabia	Medina	1,560,000	9th century BC	
31	Mauritania	Nouakchott	1,550,000	1903	
32	Morocco	Tangier	1,460,000	10th century BCE	
33	Somalia	Hargeisa	1,401,000	1860	
34	Morocco	Fez	1,330,000	789	
35	Morocco	Agadir	1,300,000	12th century	
36	Yemen	Taiz	1,276,000	first half of the 12th century CE	
37	Iraq	Erbil	1,240,000	~2300 BCE	
38	Tunisia	Sousse	1,200,000	800–909	
39	Iraq	Kirkuk	1,190,000	2335 BC	
40	Morocco	Marrakesh	1,150,000	1070	
41	Jordan	Irbid	1,090,000	~3,200 BCE (possibly earlier)	
42	Saudi Arabia	Hofuf	1,070,000	1871	
43	Iraq	Najaf	1,070,000	791 AD	
44	United Arab Emirates	Al Ain	1,060,000	985 CE	
45	Saudi Arabia	Khamis Mushait	1,050,000	1760s	
46	Yemen	Aden	1,021,000	8th century BC	

== See also ==
- List of largest metropolitan areas of the Middle East
- List of Arab countries by population
- List of largest cities
