= List of largest metropolitan areas in the Middle East =

This is a list of metropolitan areas in the Middle East, with their population according to different sources. The list includes metropolitan areas that have a population of over 1.5 million.

== List ==
| Rank | City | Country | Metropolitan population | City population | Image |
|---|---|---|---|---|---|
| 1 | Cairo | Egypt | 23,200,000 | 10,248,385 | |
| 2 | Tehran | Iran | 17,200,000 | 14,437,000 | |
| 3 | Istanbul | Turkey | 16,200,000 | 15,907,951 | |
| 4 | Baghdad | Iraq | 8,000,000 | 6,719,476 | |
| 5 | Riyadh | Saudi Arabia | 7,900,000 | 7,009,120 | |
| 6 | Dubai | United Arab Emirates | 6,650,000 | 3,655,000 | |
| 7 | Alexandria | Egypt | 6,350,000 | 5,546,663 | |
| 8 | Amman | Jordan | 6,300,000 | 4,642,000 | |
| 9 | Ankara | Turkey | 5,250,000 | 5,186,002 | |
| 10 | Kuwait City | Kuwait | 4,825,000 | 3,405,000 | |
| 11 | Damascus | Syria | 4,050,000 | 2,103,000 | |
| 12 | Jeddah | Saudi Arabia | 4,000,000 | 3,751,722 | |
| 13 | Mashhad | Iran | 3,525,000 | 3,372,660 | |
| 14 | Isfahan | Iran | 3,475,000 | 2,243,249 | |
| 15 | Sanaa | Yemen | 3,400,000 | 2,545,000 | |
| 16 | Tel Aviv | Israel | 3,050,000 | 1,481,400 | |
| 17 | İzmir | Turkey | 3,025,000 | 2,948,609 | |
| 18 | Dammam | Saudi Arabia | 3,000,000 | 1,532,326 | |
| 19 | Mecca | Saudi Arabia | 2,775,000 | 2,385,509 | |
| 20 | Doha | Qatar | 2,700,000 | 1,186,023 | |
| 21 | Bursa | Turkey | 2,225,000 | 2,083,698 | |
| 22 | Aleppo | Syria | 2,025,000 | 1,800,000 | |
| 23 | Tabriz | Iran | 2,000,000 | 1,773,033 | |
| 24 | Shiraz | Iran | 1,990,000 | 1,869,001 | |
| 25 | Gaza City | Palestine | 1,990,000 | 749,100 | |
| 26 | Beirut | Lebanon | 1,970,000 | 1,650,000 | |
| 27 | Abu Dhabi | United Arab Emirates | 1,960,000 | 1,750,000 | |
| 28 | Adana | Turkey | 1,790,000 | 1,779,463 | |
| 29 | Gaziantep | Turkey | 1,770,000 | 1,680,723 | |
| 30 | Basra | Iraq | 1,750,000 | 1,436,253 | |
| 31 | Muscat | Oman | 1,700,000 | 1,302,440 | |
| 32 | Mosul | Iraq | 1,580,000 | 1,438,351 | |
| 33 | Ahvaz | Iran | 1,580,000 | 1,302,591 | |
| 34 | Manama | Bahrain | 1,580,000 | 743,066 | |
| 35 | Medina | Saudi Arabia | 1,560,000 | 1,477,047 | |

== See also ==
- List of cities of the ancient Near East
- List of largest cities in the Arab world
- List of Middle Eastern countries by population
