= List of Middle Eastern countries by population =

The following is a list of countries in the Middle East sorted by projected population.

== Table ==
Rank	Country (or dependent territory)	2020 projection Note 1	% of pop.	Average annual growth		Estimated doubling time (years) Note 2	Official population figure (where available)	Date of last figure	Source
Rank	Country (or dependent territory)	2020 projection Note 1	% of pop.	% Note 3	Number Note 4	Estimated doubling time (years) Note 2	Official population figure (where available)	Date of last figure	Source
1	Egypt	113,210,388	22.53	1.94	1,981,000	31	101,045,000	April 18, 2026	
2	Iran	89,351,259	18.51	1.30	1,001,000	54	80,524,000	April 18, 2026	
3	Turkey	85,372,377	18.63	1.09	909,452	64	83,614,362	December 31, 2023	
4	Iraq	40,063,400	8.85	2.32	1,030,000	24	47,663,306	February 4, 2026	
5	Saudi Arabia	34,719,000	7.67	1.59	751,000	29	34,719,418	April 28, 2020	
6	Yemen	29,710,300	6.56	2.28	766,000	24	29,719,300	April 28, 2020	
7	Syria	17,425,600	3.85	2.45	557,000	29	21,377,000	April 28, 2020	
8	Jordan	10,185,500	2.25	1.00	183,000	26	10,248,069	2020	
9	United Arab Emirates	9,869,000	2.18	1.32	83,000	76	9,154,000	April 28, 2020	
10	Israel	9,842,000	1.91	1.60	162,000	37	9,100,000	February 11, 2024	
11	Lebanon	6,830,600	1.51	-0.44	75,000	39	6,830,600	April 28, 2020	
12	Palestine (West Bank and Gaza Strip)	5,148,249	1.14	2.41	—	24	4,816,503	2020	
13	Oman	5,081,600	1.12	2.65	204,000	14	5,051,000	April 18, 2026	
14	Kuwait	4,259,500	0.94	1.51	121,000	23	4,259,500	April 28, 2020	
15	Qatar	2,113,000	0.47	4.29	87,000	16	2,412,483	October 31, 2015	Monthly official estimate
16	Bahrain	1,690,900	0.37	3.68	122,000	10	1,701,000	April 28, 2020	
	Total	452,748,183	100.00	2.01	8,284,000	35	411,788,402	—	

Note 1: Calculated, where available, from the latest national censuses or most recent official estimates (many of which are cited in their respective column), using the exponential formula shown on the List of countries by past and future population article. This is done to normalize the different populations to a unique date, so that they are really comparable.

Note 2: Assuming continuation of the same compound annual growth rate, i.e. based on the formula: LN(2)/LN(%growth/100+1), or equivalently: LOG_{10}(2)/LOG_{10}(%growth/100+1).

Note 3: From 2019 to 2020, i.e using the formula: (100 × projection_{2020}/projection_{2019}) − 100.

Note 4: It corresponds to the calculation: projection_{2015}*annual_growth/100.

== See also ==
- Demographics of the Middle East
- List of Arab League countries by population
