= Demographics of Yemen =

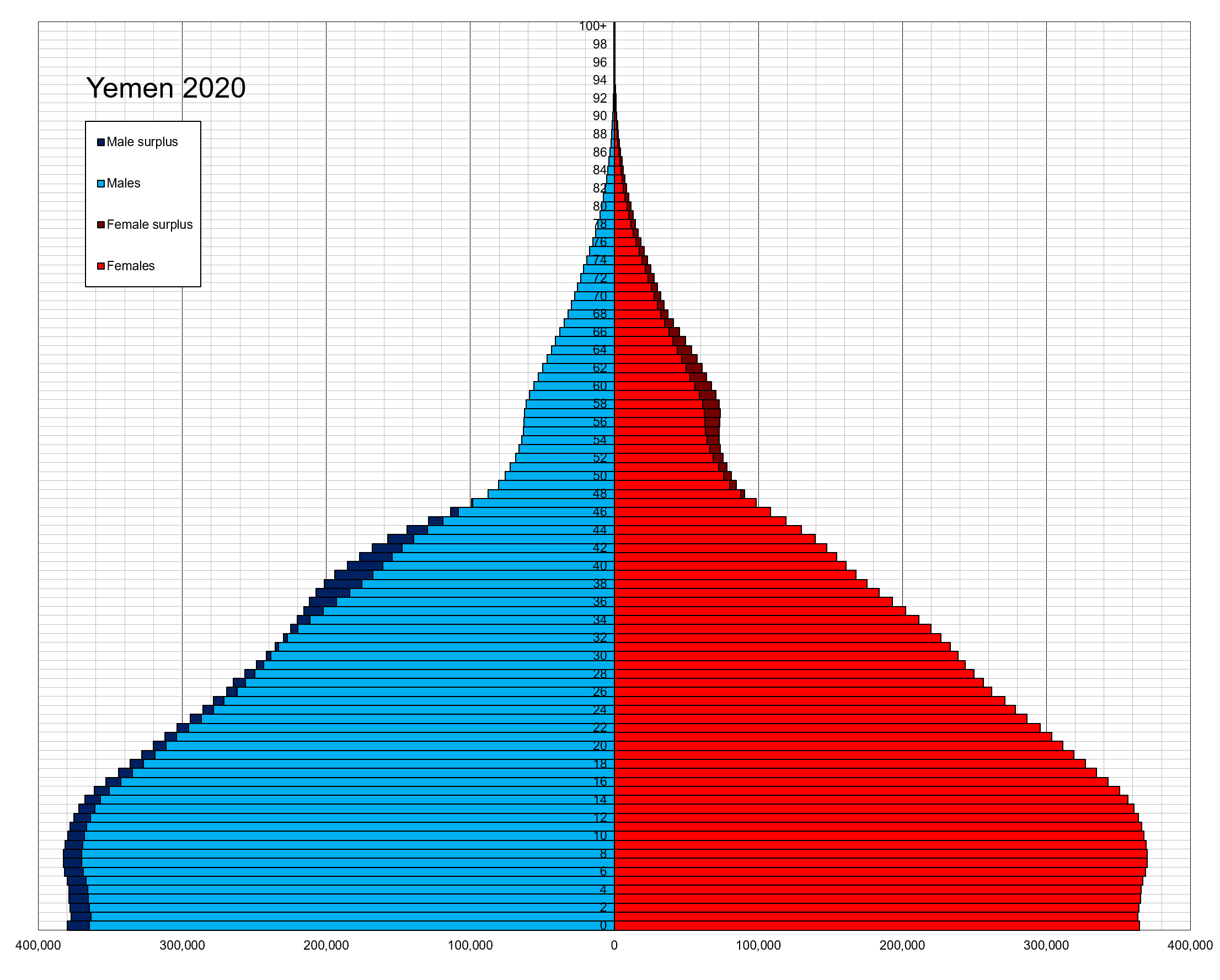
- Population pyramid of Yemen in 2020
- Population: 32,684,503 (2023 est.)
- Growth rate: 2.17% (2022 est.)
- Birth rate: 24.64 births/1,000 population (2022 est.)
- Death rate: 5.62 deaths/1,000 population (2022 est.)
- Life expectancy: 69.21 years
  - male: 65.19 years
  - female: 69.94 years
- Fertility rate: 3.01 children born/woman (2022 est.)
- Infant mortality: 46.54 deaths/1,000 live births
- Net migration rate: -0.19 migrant(s)/1,000 population (2022 est.)
- Immigrant share: 1.0% (2024)

Age structure
- 0–14 years: 39.16%
- 65 and over: 2.8%

Sex ratio
- Total: 1.02 male(s)/female (2022 est.)
- At birth: 1.05 male(s)/female
- Under 15: 1.04 male(s)/female
- 65 and over: 0.69 male(s)/female

Nationality
- Nationality: Yemeni
- Major ethnic: Arabs
- Minor ethnic: Afro-Arabs; Somalis; Mehri; Socotrans; Others

Language
- Official: Arabic

Demographic features of the population of Yemen (Arabic: سكان اليمن) include population density, ethnicity, education level, health of the populace, economic status, religious affiliations and other aspects of the population, gathered by census. The last official census in Yemen was in December 2004.

== Population ==
Historical population
Year	Pop.	±% p.a.
0	1,001,000	—
500	2,150,000	+0.15%
1000	2,250,000	+0.01%
1500	2,250,000	+0.00%
1700	2,250,000	+0.00%
1900	2,490,000	+0.05%
1950	4,316,000	+1.11%
1960	5,116,000	+1.71%
1970	6,145,000	+1.85%
1980	7,945,000	+2.60%
1990	11,948,000	+4.16%
2000	17,723,000	+4.02%
2010	24,053,000	+3.10%
2020	30,932,546	+2.55%
Source: 2020

The population of Yemen was about 33 million according to 2021 estimates, with 46% of the population being under 15 years old and 2.7% above 65 years. In 1950, it was 4.3 million. By 2050, the population is estimated to increase to about 60 million.

Yemenis are mainly of Arab ethnicity. When the former states of North and South Yemen were established, most resident minority groups departed. Yemen is still a largely tribal society. In the northern, mountainous parts of the country, there are some 400 Zaidi tribes. There are also hereditary caste groups in urban areas such as Al-Akhdam.

According to the USCRI, Yemen hosted a population of refugees and asylum seekers numbering approximately 69 in 2017. Refugees and asylum seekers living in Yemen were predominantly from Iraq, Somalia, Ethiopia, and Syria.

Yemen's historical population

=== Age structure ===
Population Estimates by Sex and Age Group (01.VII.2013) (Data refer to national projections.):

Age group	Male	Female	Total	%
Total	12 844 169	12 390 910	25 235 079	100
0–4	2 069 855	1 981 763	4 051 618	16.06
5–9	1 723 755	1 653 391	3 377 146	13.38
10–14	1 539 447	1 467 798	3 007 245	11.92
15–19	1 530 854	1 423 803	2 954 657	11.71
20–24	1 426 490	1 312 083	2 738 574	10.85
25–29	1 146 775	1 080 140	2 226 915	8.82
30–34	851 154	837 094	1 688 248	6.69
35–39	635 492	641 256	1 276 748	5.06
40–44	448 186	468 200	916 385	3.63
45–49	366 733	392 010	758 743	3.01
50–54	310 025	334 665	644 689	2.55
55–59	238 877	249 982	488 859	1.94
60–64	178 041	174 631	352 671	1.40
65–69	135 090	131 812	266 902	1.06
70–74	98 257	97 029	195 287	0.77
75–79	66 656	66 691	133 347	0.53
80+	78 482	78 565	157 047	0.62
Age group	Male	Female	Total	Percent
0–14	5 333 057	5 102 952	10 436 009	41.36
15–64	7 132 627	6 913 861	14 046 488	55.66
65+	378 485	374 097	752 582	2.98

Population Estimates by Sex and Age Group (01.VII.2017) (Data refer to national projections.):

Age group	Male	Female	Total	%
Total	14 334 126	13 836 282	28 170 408	100
0–4	2 213 674	2 118 177	4 331 851	15.38
5–9	1 992 122	1 901 034	3 893 155	13.82
10–14	1 639 285	1 573 936	3 213 221	11.41
15–19	1 529 732	1 451 328	2 981 060	10.58
20–24	1 509 363	1 398 464	2 907 826	10.32
25–29	1 367 680	1 260 306	2 627 986	9.33
30–34	1 063 494	1 010 846	2 074 340	7.36
35–39	799 595	789 413	1 589 008	5.64
40–44	577 738	587 770	1 165 508	4.14
45–49	415 599	438 461	854 059	3.03
50–54	343 155	371 721	714 875	2.54
55–59	279 808	307 024	586 832	2.08
60–64	206 651	218 537	425 188	1.51
65–69	148 672	150 710	299 382	1.06
70–74	105 257	108 159	213 416	0.76
75–79	69 010	72 586	141 596	0.50
80+	73 292	77 812	151 104	0.54
Age group	Male	Female	Total	Percent
0–14	5 845 081	5 593 147	11 438 228	40.60
15–64	8 092 814	7 833 868	15 926 682	56.54
65+	396 231	409 267	805 498	2.86

=== Urbanization ===
Urban population: 31% of total population (2008)
Rate of urbanization: 4.9% annual rate of change (2005–2010 est.)

== Vital statistics ==
In 2007 the birthrate and death rate were estimated to be 42.7 per 1,000 and 8.1 per 1,000, respectively (CIA est.). The infant mortality rate was almost 58 deaths per 1,000 live births. The rate was estimated to be higher for males than for females—more than 62 male deaths per 1,000 live births, as compared with about 53 female deaths per 1,000 live births. Despite an increase of 14 years in the last decade, life expectancy at birth in Yemen has remained low compared with other developing countries—60.6 years for males and 64.5 years for females, or 62.5 years overall. The country's fertility rate was almost 6.5 children per woman in 2007 free.

=== UN estimates ===
Year	Population	Live births per year	Deaths per year	Natural change per year	CBR^{1}	CDR^{1}	NC^{1}	TFR^{1}	IMR^{1}	Life expectancy (years)
1950	4,713,000	248,000	166,000	82,000	52.6	35.1	17.4	7.92	318.3	31.66
1951	4,783,000	252,000	166,000	86,000	52.7	34.7	17.9	7.90	317.6	31.68
1952	4,856,000	257,000	168,000	89,000	52.8	34.5	18.3	7.88	316.2	31.80
1953	4,932,000	262,000	170,000	92,000	53.1	34.3	18.7	7.90	314.8	31.93
1954	5,011,000	267,000	172,000	95,000	53.2	34.3	18.9	7.90	313.4	32.04
1955	5,092,000	272,000	175,000	98,000	53.4	34.2	19.2	7.89	312.0	32.17
1956	5,175,000	278,000	177,000	101,000	53.6	34.2	19.4	7.90	310.6	32.27
1957	5,261,000	283,000	180,000	103,000	53.7	34.2	19.5	7.89	309.2	32.36
1958	5,350,000	289,000	181,000	108,000	53.9	33.8	20.1	7.90	303.4	32.79
1959	5,444,000	295,000	182,000	113,000	54.1	33.4	20.7	7.92	298.1	33.19
1960	5,542,000	302,000	183,000	119,000	54.4	33.0	21.4	7.94	293.0	33.68
1961	5,647,000	309,000	185,000	124,000	54.7	32.7	22.0	7.96	287.8	34.10
1962	5,753,000	316,000	191,000	124,000	54.8	33.2	21.6	7.96	283.8	33.62
1963	5,860,000	323,000	197,000	125,000	54.9	33.6	21.4	7.98	280.0	33.25
1964	5,974,000	331,000	192,000	139,000	55.3	32.1	23.2	8.04	272.0	34.74
1965	6,097,000	339,000	193,000	146,000	55.4	31.5	23.9	8.07	265.0	35.37
1966	6,228,000	347,000	192,000	155,000	55.6	30.8	24.8	8.13	257.1	36.10
1967	6,368,000	355,000	192,000	164,000	55.7	30.1	25.6	8.17	248.9	36.87
1968	6,516,000	362,000	190,000	172,000	55.5	29.2	26.4	8.20	240.3	37.80
1969	6,674,000	369,000	184,000	185,000	55.2	27.5	27.6	8.22	230.3	39.47
1970	6,844,000	378,000	182,000	196,000	55.1	26.5	28.6	8.24	221.3	40.50
1971	7,024,000	387,000	180,000	207,000	55.1	25.6	29.5	8.26	212.9	41.54
1972	7,216,000	398,000	179,000	219,000	55.0	24.7	30.3	8.30	204.8	42.46
1973	7,418,000	406,000	177,000	229,000	54.7	23.9	30.8	8.30	197.1	43.35
1974	7,630,000	416,000	175,000	241,000	54.5	23.0	31.5	8.34	189.5	44.33
1975	7,856,000	430,000	174,000	256,000	54.6	22.1	32.5	8.40	181.5	45.25
1976	8,095,000	442,000	172,000	270,000	54.5	21.2	33.3	8.44	173.2	46.24
1977	8,348,000	456,000	170,000	286,000	54.5	20.3	34.2	8.50	164.8	47.29
1978	8,615,000	468,000	167,000	300,000	54.2	19.4	34.8	8.52	156.4	48.39
1979	8,900,000	488,000	166,000	322,000	54.7	18.6	36.2	8.67	147.9	49.39
1980	9,205,000	504,000	162,000	341,000	54.6	17.6	37.0	8.71	139.8	50.65
1981	9,529,000	519,000	160,000	359,000	54.4	16.7	37.6	8.75	132.0	51.71
1982	9,872,000	536,000	159,000	377,000	54.2	16.1	38.1	8.79	125.5	52.41
1983	10,237,000	554,000	154,000	400,000	54.0	15.0	39.0	8.83	118.1	53.92
1984	10,626,000	570,000	151,000	418,000	53.5	14.2	39.3	8.85	112.0	54.93
1985	11,037,000	588,000	150,000	438,000	53.2	13.6	39.7	8.86	106.5	55.69
1986	11,465,000	606,000	161,000	445,000	52.8	14.1	38.8	8.86	102.0	53.82
1987	11,916,000	625,000	149,000	476,000	52.4	12.5	39.9	8.83	97.9	57.10
1988	12,387,000	643,000	149,000	495,000	51.9	12.0	39.9	8.79	94.3	57.76
1989	12,872,000	660,000	149,000	510,000	51.2	11.6	39.6	8.71	91.4	58.22
1990	13,375,000	678,000	150,000	528,000	50.6	11.2	39.4	8.61	88.8	58.70
1991	13,896,000	696,000	151,000	544,000	50.0	10.9	39.1	8.46	86.4	59.05
1992	14,434,000	713,000	153,000	561,000	49.4	10.6	38.8	8.27	84.3	59.43
1993	14,988,000	730,000	154,000	576,000	48.7	10.2	38.4	8.05	82.5	59.86
1994	15,553,000	738,000	157,000	581,000	47.5	10.1	37.3	7.80	80.9	59.71
1995	16,103,000	743,000	156,000	588,000	46.1	9.6	36.4	7.53	79.5	60.45
1996	16,614,000	720,000	156,000	565,000	43.3	9.3	33.9	7.02	78.2	60.57
1997	17,109,000	729,000	153,000	576,000	42.5	8.9	33.6	6.83	76.4	61.12
1998	17,608,000	732,000	153,000	579,000	41.5	8.7	32.8	6.64	74.1	61.38
1999	18,115,000	746,000	151,000	596,000	41.1	8.3	32.8	6.51	71.5	61.98
2000	18,629,000	751,000	148,000	603,000	40.2	7.9	32.3	6.32	68.7	62.59
2001	19,143,000	753,000	145,000	608,000	39.2	7.6	31.7	6.11	65.9	63.22
2002	19,661,000	762,000	142,000	620,000	38.7	7.2	31.5	5.94	62.8	63.91
2003	20,189,000	780,000	140,000	641,000	38.5	6.9	31.6	5.82	59.9	64.54
2004	20,733,000	794,000	139,000	656,000	38.2	6.7	31.6	5.71	57.2	65.01
2005	21,321,000	810,000	137,000	673,000	37.9	6.4	31.5	5.58	54.8	65.54
2006	21,966,000	831,000	136,000	694,000	37.8	6.2	31.6	5.43	52.3	65.99
2007	22,642,000	842,000	135,000	707,000	37.2	6.0	31.2	5.27	50.0	66.57
2008	23,329,000	857,000	135,000	723,000	36.7	5.8	31.0	5.13	47.9	66.96
2009	24,030,000	871,000	136,000	735,000	36.2	5.7	30.5	4.99	46.4	67.20
2010	24,744,000	886,000	139,000	748,000	35.8	5.6	30.2	4.86	45.7	67.28
2011	25,476,000	905,000	142,000	763,000	35.5	5.6	29.9	4.74	45.4	67.42
2012	26,223,000	922,000	146,000	775,000	35.1	5.6	29.5	4.63	45.5	67.34
2013	26,984,000	939,000	149,000	791,000	34.8	5.5	29.3	4.53	45.4	67.55
2014	27,753,000	956,000	155,000	802,000	34.4	5.6	28.9	4.43	45.5	67.38
2015	28,517,000	968,000	175,000	793,000	33.9	6.1	27.8	4.32	46.3	65.87
2016	29,274,000	977,000	177,000	800,000	33.3	6.1	27.3	4.21	46.2	66.06
2017	30,034,000	983,000	183,000	800,000	32.7	6.1	26.6	4.11	46.1	65.96
2018	30,791,000	995,000	204,000	791,000	32.3	6.6	25.7	4.04	46.6	64.58
2019	31,547,000	1,003,000	203,000	801,000	31.8	6.4	25.4	3.96	46.5	65.09
2020	32,284,000	1,010,000	210,000	800,000	31.3	6.5	24.7	3.89	45.9	64.65
2021	32,982,000	1,009,000	226,000	783,000	30.5	6.8	23.7	3.80	46.8	63.75
^{1} CBR = crude birth rate (per 1000); CDR = crude death rate (per 1000); NC = natural change (per 1000); TFR = total fertility rate (number of children per woman); IMR = infant mortality rate per 1000 births

=== Demographic and Health Surveys ===
Total Fertility Rate (TFR) (Wanted Fertility Rate) and Crude Birth Rate (CBR):

Year	Total		Urban		Rural	
Year	CBR	TFR	CBR	TFR	CBR	TFR
1997	39.2	6.48	35.2	5.01	40.6	7.03
2013	33.4	4.4 (3,1)	27.4	3.2 (2,4)	36.2	5.1 (3,5)

Years	1925	1926	1927	1928	1929	1930	1931	1932	1933	1934
Total Fertility Rate in Yemen	6.88	6.90	6.91	6.93	6.94	6.96	6.98	6.99	7.01	7.02

Years	1935	1936	1937	1938	1939	1940	1941	1942	1943	1944
Total Fertility Rate in Yemen	7.04	7.05	7.07	7.09	7.10	7.12	7.13	7.15	7.16	7.18

Years	1945	1946	1947	1948	1949
Total Fertility Rate in Yemen	7.20	7.21	7.23	7.24	7.26

=== Life expectancy ===
Period	Life expectancy in years	Period	Life expectancy in years
1950–1955	34.7	1985–1990	56.8
1955–1960	34.7	1990–1995	58.5
1960–1965	34.7	1995–2000	59.8
1965–1970	39.1	2000–2005	61.0
1970–1975	43.3	2005–2010	62.8
1975–1980	48.1	2010–2015	64.2
1980–1985	53.0		

Source: UN World Population Prospects

== Ethnic groups ==
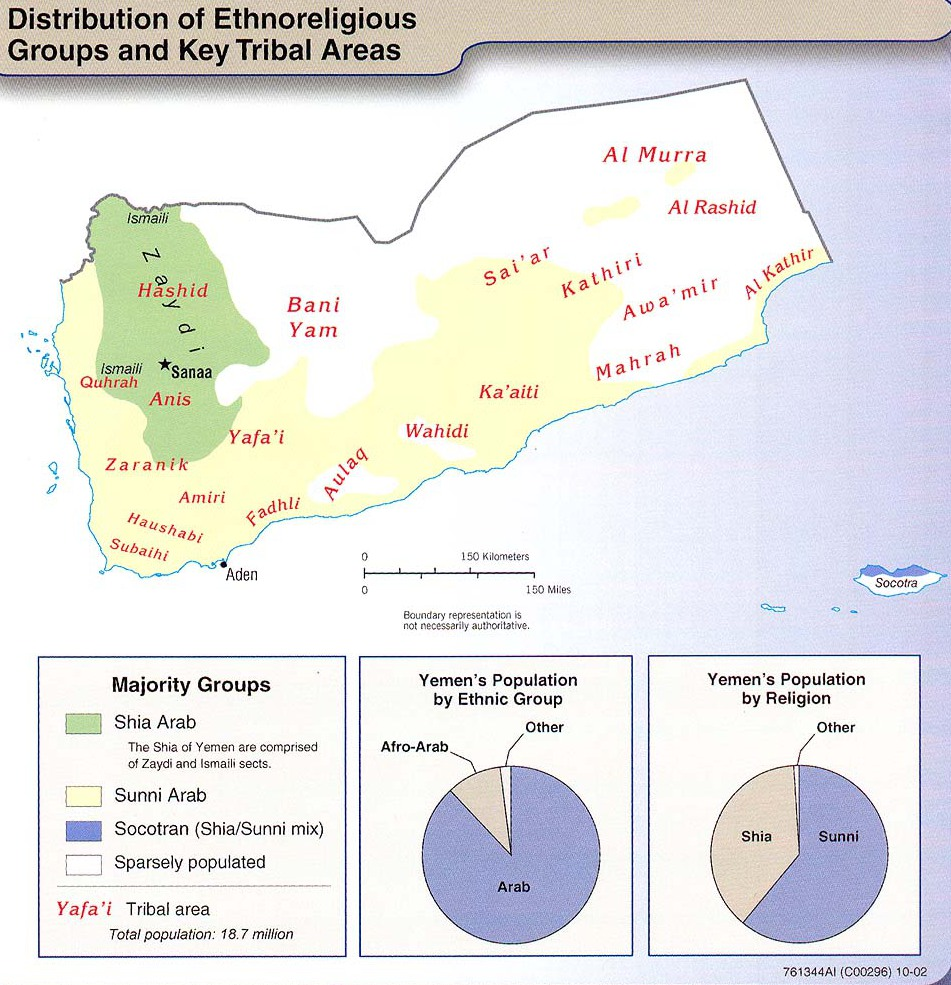
Yemen's tribal areas and Shia/Sunni regions. Shia Muslims predominant in the green area of Yemen's West, with the rest of Yemen being Sunni Muslims.

The ethnic makeup of Yemen consists predominantly of Arabs; but also includes minorities from the Horn of Africa, South Asia, and Europe. Yemen was formerly also home to a Jewish diaspora community.

== Languages ==
Arabic is the official language; English is also used in official and business circles. In the Mahra area (the extreme east), several others Arabic languages (including Mehri) are spoken. When the former states of North and South Yemen were established, most resident minority groups departed.

== Religion ==
Religions of Yemen (2010 )
Religions	percent
Islam	99.1%
Other (includes Jewish, Baháʼí Faith, and Christian)	0.9%

Religion in Yemen (2022 estimate)
1. Shafi'i Islam (65.0%)
2. Zaydi Islam (34.0%)
3. Ismaili Shia, Twelver Shi'ism, Baháʼí, Hindu, Christian or irreligious (1.00%)

Religion in Yemen consists primarily of two principal Islamic religious groups: by various sources, 53-65% of the Muslim population is Sunni and 30–44.5% is Shia. Sunnis primarily adhere to the Shafi'i school, and there are also significant followers of the Maliki and Hanbali schools. Shias are primarily Zaidi and also have significant minorities of Twelver and Ismaili Shias.

Zaidis are generally found in the interior north and northwest, and Shafi'is on the coast and in the south and southeast. There is also a small minority of Christians and Jews.

== Migration ==
=== Emigration ===
The Yemeni diaspora is largely concentrated in the United Kingdom, where between 70,000 and 80,000 Yemenis live. Over 20,000 Yemenis reside in the United States, and an additional 2,812 live in Italy. Other Yemenis also reside in Saudi Arabia, the United Arab Emirates, Qatar and Bahrain, as well as Indonesia, Malaysia, Brunei, and the former USSR. A smaller number of modern-day Pakistanis are of Yemeni descent, their original ancestors having left Yemen for the Indian subcontinent and Southeast Asia over four centuries ago. 350,000 Yemenite Jews live in Israel. In 2015, due to the conflict in Yemen, many Yemenis have migrated to the northern coasts of Djibouti and Somalia.

== See also ==
- Yemen
- Health in Yemen
- Demographics of the Middle East
- Tribes in Yemen
