= Demographics of Morocco =

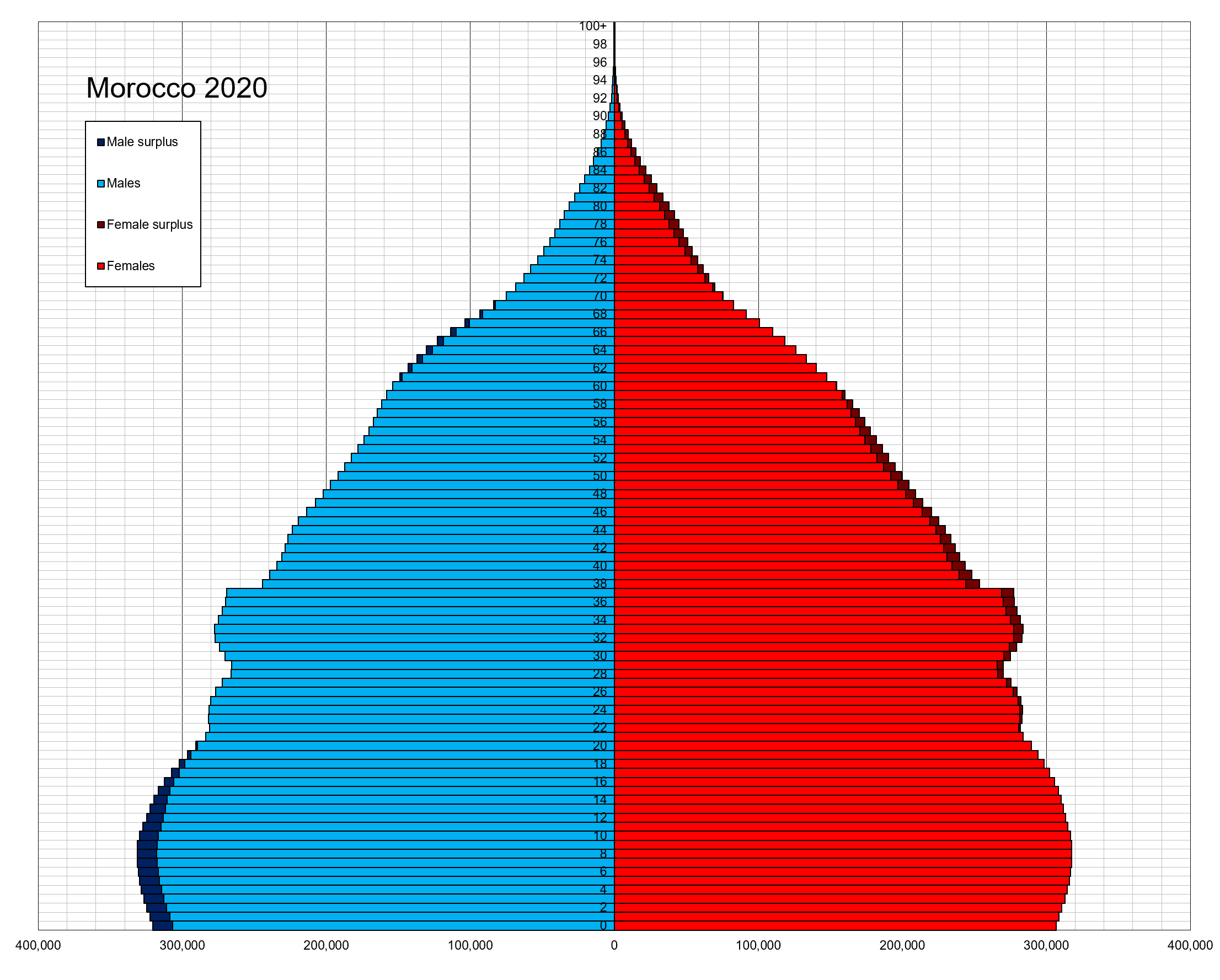
- Population pyramid of Morocco in 2020
- Population: 37,254,695 (2026 National annual projection)
- Growth rate: 0.7% (2024 estimate)
- Birth rate: 16.4 births/1,000 population (2024 est.)
- Death rate: 5.73 deaths/1,000 population (2024 est.)
- Life expectancy: 76.4 years (2024)
- Fertility rate: 1.97 children born/woman (2024 census)
- Infant mortality: 15 deaths/1,000 live births (2024)
- Net migration rate: -1.74 migrant(s)/1,000 population (2022 est.)
- Immigrant share: 0.3% (2024)

Age structure
- 0–14 years: 24.91%
- 15–64 years: 66.89%
- 65 and over: 8.20%

Sex ratio
- Total: 1 male(s)/female (2022 est.)
- At birth: 1.05 male(s)/female
- Under 15: 1.04 male(s)/female
- 65 and over: 0.81 male(s)/female

Nationality
- Nationality: Moroccan

Language
- Official: Arabic, Tamazight
- Spoken: Moroccan Arabic, Berber languages

Demographic features of the population of Morocco include population density, ethnicity, religious affiliations and other aspects of the population. All figures are from the Haut-Commissariat au Plan of Morocco or the United Nations Demographic Yearbooks, unless otherwise indicated.

The population of Morocco in 2024 was 36,828,330. Moroccans are primarily of Arab, Berber, and Morisco origins. Socially, there are two contrasting groups of Moroccans: those living in the cities and those in rural areas. Among Morocco's rural communities, several socio-economic classes have formed. The majority of the Moroccan population lives in northwestern Morocco, along the fertile coastal regions near the Mediterranean Sea.

About 99 percent of Moroccans are considered to be Sunni Muslims (either religiously or culturally). The significant and millennia-old Jewish minority has largely decreased since the creation of the State of Israel in 1948. Today there are 2,500 Moroccan Jews inside the country. Thousands of Moroccan Jews living in Europe, Israel-Palestine, and the Americas regularly visit the Morocco. There is a small minority of Moroccan Christians. In 2014, most of the 86,206 foreign residents are French, Spaniards, Algerians, and sub-Saharan African migrants.

== Population size and structure ==
Morocco Population and Housing Census
Year	Pop.	±% p.a.
1960	11,626,232	—
1971	15,321,210	+2.54%
1982	20,449,551	+2.66%
1994	26,073,717	+2.05%
2004	29,891,708	+1.38%
2014	33,762,036	+1.23%
2024	36,828,330	+0.87%

The 2024 General Population and Housing Census was conducted by the High Commission for Planning (Morocco).

=== Main populated areas ===
Most Moroccans live west and north of the Atlas Mountains, a range that insulates the country from the Sahara Desert. Casablanca is the largest city and the centre of business and industry, and has the leading seaport and airport. Rabat is the seat of government. Tangier and Nador are the two major northern seaports on the Mediterranean. Fez is a cultural, religious and industrial centre. Marrakesh and Agadir are the two major tourist centres. Oujda is the largest city of eastern Morocco. Meknes houses the military academy. Kenitra has the largest military airbase. Mohammedia has the largest oil refineries and other major industrial installations.

=== Structure of the population ===
Structure of the population (Census 2004):

Age group	Male	Female	Total	%
Total	14 640 662	15 039 407	29 680 069	100
Total(known)	14 045 137	14 783 487	28 828 624	97.13
0–4	1 488 631	1 435 833	2 924 464	9.85
5–9	1 552 440	1 502 718	3 055 158	10.29
10–14	1 666 632	1 614 368	3 281 000	11.05
15–19	1 564 900	1 583 690	3 148 590	10.61
20–24	1.426.174	1 521 526	2 947 700	9.93
25–29	1 190 111	1 292 162	2 482 273	8.36
30–34	1 054 069	1 149 302	2 203 371	7.42
35–39	897 812	993 739	1 891 551	6.37
40–44	892 083	968 391	1 860 474	6.27
45–49	758 044	731 635	1 489 679	5.02
50–54	627 433	599 755	1 227 188	4.13
55–59	370 969	388 594	759 563	2.56
60–64	340 722	400 169	740 891	2.50
65–69	261 046	274 018	535 064	1.80
70–74	236 107	267 260	503 367	1.70
75+	58 933	60 327	119 260	0.40
unknown	595 525	255 920	851 445	2.87

Age group	Male	Female	Total	Percent
0–14	4 707 703	4 552 919	9 260 622	31.20
15–64	8 781 348	9 628 963	18 410 311	62.03
65+	556 086	601 605	1 157 691	3.90

According to 2004 census

Age group	Male	Female	Total	Percent
0–14			~9 260 182	31.2
15–59			~18 164 202	61.2
60+			~2 404 086	8.1

Population Estimates by Sex and Age Group (01.VII.2013) (Based on the results of the 2004 Population Census.) :

Age group	Male	Female	Total	%
Total	16 371 475	16 578 971	32 950 445	100
0–4	1 482 899	1 421 020	2 903 919	8.81
5–9	1 453 315	1 391 847	2 845 161	8.63
10–14	1 473 231	1 420 973	2 894 204	8.78
15–19	1 547 292	1 496 243	3 043 535	9.24
20–24	1 614 483	1 564 368	3 178 851	9.65
25–29	1 477 952	1 494 267	2 972 219	9.02
30–34	1 338 558	1 409 129	2 747 687	8.34
35–39	1 106 764	1 199 802	2 306 566	7.00
40–44	975 428	1 070 441	2 045 869	6.21
45–49	862 688	947 158	1 809 846	5.49
50–54	859 927	902 421	1 762 347	5.35
55–59	704 367	670 923	1 375 290	4.17
60–64	543 733	529 913	1 073 646	3.26
65–69	314 577	348 098	662 674	2.01
70–74	276 251	333 385	609 636	1.85
75+	340 012	378 983	718 996	2.18
Age group	Male	Female	Total	Percent
0–14	4 409 445	4 233 840	8 643 285	26.23
15–64	11 031 190	11 284 665	22 315 855	67.73
65+	930 840	1 060 466	1 991 306	6.04

Structure of the population (Census 2014) :

Age group	Male	Female	Total	%
Total (known)	16 330 731	16 416 140	32 746 871	100
0–4	1 700 796	1 623 119	3 323 915	9.82
5–9	1 524 586	1 460 840	2 985 426	8.82
10–14	1 532 755	1 475 241	3 007 996	8.89
15–19	1 490 344	1 468 114	2 958 458	8.74
20–24	1 495 404	1 520 770	3 016 174	8.91
25–29	1 369 558	1 411 583	2 781 141	8.22
30–34	1 289 375	1 338 721	2 628 096	7.76
35–39	1 137 269	1 198 986	2 336 255	6.90
40–44	1 058 073	1 102 280	2 160 353	6.38
45–49	879 096	926 400	1 805 496	5.33
50–54	877 383	925 006	1 802 389	5.32
55–59	715 207	669 610	1 384 817	4.09
60–64	594 071	566 539	1 160 610	3.43
65–69	316 816	321 867	638 683	1.89
70–74	268 617	316 576	585 193	1.73
75–79	81 381	90 488	171 869	0.51
unknown			1 101 371	3.25
Age group	Male	Female	Total	Percent
0–14	4 758 137	4 559 200	9 317 337	27.53
15–64	10 905 780	11 128 009	22 033 789	65.10
65+	666 814	728 931	1 395 745	4.12

According to 2014 census

Age group	Male	Female	Total	Percent
0–14			~9 477 508	28.0%
15–59			~21 121 303	62.4%
60+			~3 249 431	9.6%

Population Estimates by Sex and Age Group (01.VII.2020) (Projections based on the results of national survey on population and health conducted between 2010 and 2011, and especially population and housing census 2014.):

Age group	Male	Female	Total	%
Total	17 906 986	18 044 671	35 591 657	100
0–4	1 492 467	1 429 285	2 921 752	8.21
5–9	1 708 600	1 633 163	3 341 763	9.39
10–14	1 559 465	1 499 301	3 058 766	8.59
15–19	1 543 022	1 476 586	3 019 608	8.48
20–24	1 485 093	1 464 748	2 949 841	8.29
25–29	1 486 386	1 512 412	2 998 798	8.43
30–34	1 375 309	1 425 420	2 800 729	7.87
35–39	1 285 134	1 341 877	2 627 011	7.38
40–44	1 151 768	1 222 974	2 374 742	6.67
45–49	1 060 816	1 114 695	2 175 511	6.11
50–54	896 058	947 784	1 843 842	5.18
55–59	870 841	911 813	1 782 654	5.01
60–64	712 857	690 587	1 403 444	3.94
65–69	571 519	554 058	1 125 577	3.16
70–74	312 752	324 624	637 376	1.79
75–79	213 596	265 028	478 624	1.34
80+	181 303	230 316	411 619	1.16
Age group	Male	Female	Total	Percent
0–14	4 760 532	4 561 749	9 322 281	26.19
15–64	11 867 284	12 108 896	23 976 180	67.36
65+	1 279 170	1 374 026	2 653 196	7.45

Population Estimates by Sex and Age Group (01.I.2023):

Age group	Male	Female	Total	%
Total	18 439 000	18 583 000	37 022 000	100
0–4	1 479 000	1 416 000	2 894 000	7.82
5–9	1 555 000	1 490 000	3 046 000	8.23
10–14	1 678 000	1 605 000	3 283 000	8.87
15–19	1 522 000	1 463 000	2 985 000	8.06
20–24	1 518 000	1 464 000	2 982 000	8.05
25–29	1 456 000	1 460 000	2 916 000	7.88
30–34	1 446 000	1 489 000	2 935 000	7.93
35–39	1 316 000	1 373 000	2 689 000	7.26
40–44	1 232 000	1 293 000	2 525 000	6.82
45–49	1 099 000	1 168 000	2 267 000	6.12
50–54	997 000	1 048 000	2 045 000	5.52
55–59	853 000	906 000	1 759 000	4.75
60–64	817 000	843 000	1 661 000	4.49
65-69	622 000	598 000	1 220 000	3.30
70-74	450 000	457 000	907 000	2.45
75-79	209 000	245 000	455 000	1.23
80+	190 000	264 000	454 000	1.23
Age group	Male	Female	Total	Percent
0–14	4 712 000	4 511 000	9 223 000	24.91
15–64	12 256 000	12 508 000	24 763 000	66.89
65+	1 471 000	1 564 000	3 036 000	8.20

View source data.
View source data.

== Vital statistics ==
	Average population	Live births	Deaths	Natural change	Crude birth rate (per 1,000)	Crude death rate (per 1,000)	Natural change (per 1,000)	Fertility rates
1960	11,626,000							
1962	12,177,000	561 360	227 710	333 650	46.1	18.7	27.4	7.20
1971	15,379,000							
1972	15,772,000							
1973	16,196,000							
1974	16,630,000							
1975	17,072,000							5.91
1976	17,521,000							
1977	17,978,000							
1978	18,440,000							
1979	18,908,000							
1980	19,380,000							
1981	19,855,000							
1982	20,419,000	756 425	215 504	540 921	37.2	10.6	26.6	5.52
1983	20,815,000							
1984	21,297,000							
1985	21,779,000							
1986	22,261,000							
1987	22,742,000							
1988	23,220,000							
1989	23,696,000							
1990	24,167,000							
1991	24,634,000							
1992	25,095,000							
1993	25,549,000							
1994	26,074,000	675 896	174 173	501 723	26.0	6.7	19.3	3.28
1995	26,435,000							
1996	26,864,000							
1997	27,282,000							
1998	27,689,000							
1999	28,084,000							
2000	28,466,000							
2001	28,833,000							
2002	29,185,000							
2003	29,520,000							
2004	29,892,000	602 768	173 073	429 696	20.2	5.8	14.4	2.47
2005	30,215,000							
2006	30,606,000							
2007	30,998,000							
2008	31,391,000							
2009	31,786,000							
2010	32,182,000	599 607	178 606	421 001	18.8	5.6	13.2	2.19
2011	32,579,000							
2012	32,978,000				18.5	5.1	13.4	
2013	33,378,000				18.3	5.1	13.2	
2014	33,848,242				18.1	5.1	13.0	2.21
2015	34,124,870				17.6	5.4	12.3	
2016	34,486,536				17.4	5.2	12.2	
2017	34,852,121	677,411			17.2	5.1	12.1	
2018	35,219,547	679,863 (623,036)	141,207	481,829	17.7	5.1	12.6	2.38
2019	35,586,616	681,606 (749,758)			21.1	5.0	16.1	
2020	35,952,000	682,984 (660,391)			18.4			
2021	37,082,000	684,121 (650,892)	228,888	422,004	17.55	6.17	11.38	
2022		684,738						2.07
2023	37,022,000	592,352	188,812	403,540	16.0	5.1	10.9	2.05
2024	36,828,330	560,000(e)			15.2			1.97
2025	36,800,000(e)	540,000(e)			14.7			1.90(e)

Source: Haut-Commissariat au Plan (HCP)

=== Demographic and Health Surveys ===
Fertility Rate (TFR) (Wanted Fertility Rate) and CBR (Crude Birth Rate):

Year	Total		Urban		Rural	
Year	CBR	TFR	CBR	TFR	CBR	TFR
1987		4,62 (3,76)		3,24 (2,55)		5,88 (4,88)
1992	28,4	4,04 (2,66)	21,5	2,54 (1,73)	33,7	5,54 (3,62)
1995	26,0	3,31 (2,24)	20,4	2,17 (1,51)	30,6	4,50 (3,01)
2003–2004	21,1	2,5 (1,8)	18,7	2,1 (1,6)	24,3	3,0 (2,2)

=== Life expectancy ===
Life expectancy in Morocco since 1950

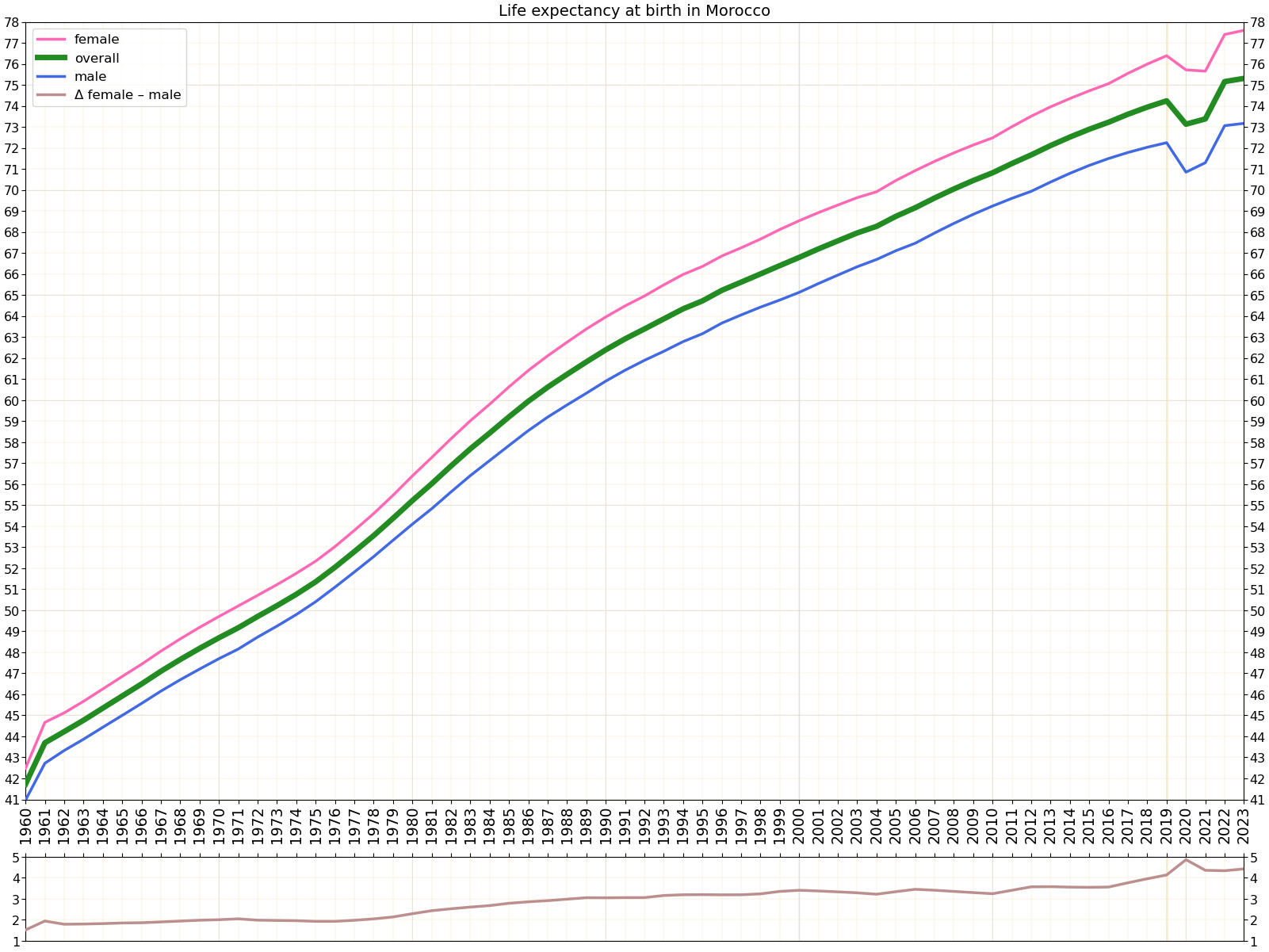
Life expectancy in Morocco since 1960 by gender

As of 2024 the life expectancy at birth in Morocco is 76.4 years , 74.7 years for men and 78.1 years for women.

== Ethnic groups ==
Moroccans are primarily of Arab, Berber, and Andalusian origins (as in other countries of the Mediterranean Maghreb). The Higher Planning Commission, the country's state statistics bureau, does not collect data on ethnic demographics, citing the historical difficulty of distinguishing between Arabs and Berbers, even among Berber speakers.

According to 2024 census data, 92.7% of the population speaks Arabic, while 24.8% regularly speak an Amazigh variety. Despite the lack of official ethnic statistics, estimates typically put the Berber population as ranging between 35–60% of the population, with some estimates as high as 70%, while estimates of the Arab population range between 40–60%.

Ethnic map of Morocco (1973)

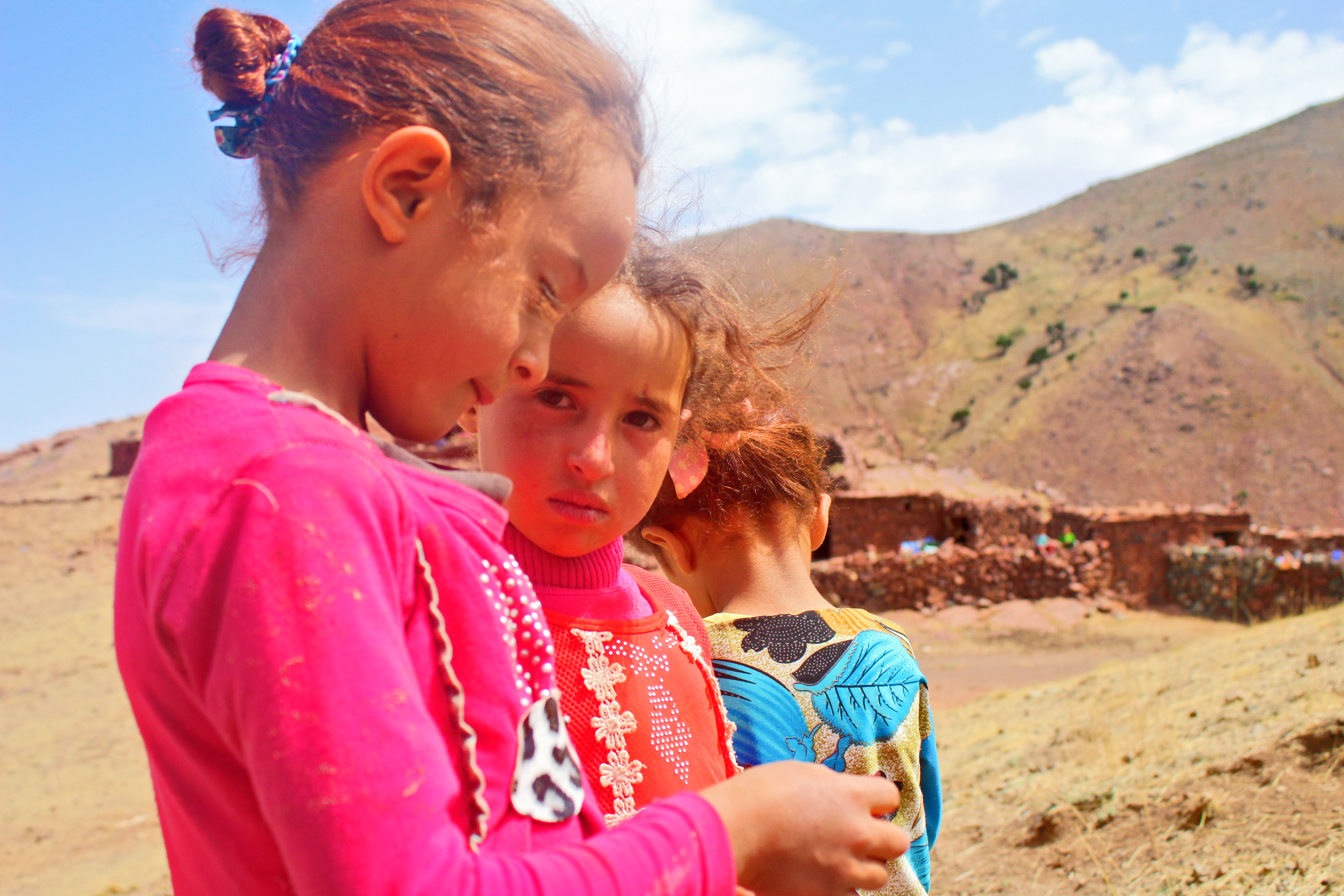
Berber girls from Morocco

The Arab population of Morocco is a result of the inflow of Arab tribes from the Arabian Peninsula and the Levant since the Muslim conquest of the Maghreb in the 7th century, with a major wave in the 11th century. During the 11th century, a major migration to the region by Arab tribes occurred as the tribes of Banu Hilal and Banu Sulaym, along with others, were sent by the Fatimids to defeat a Berber rebellion; these tribes then settled in the Maghreb. These Arab nomads displaced the indigenous Zirid and Hammadide peoples.Between the Nile and the Red Sea were Arab tribes expelled from Arabia for their turbulence, Banu Hilal and Banu Sulaym, who often plundered farming areas in the Nile Valley. According to Ibn Khaldun, whole tribes set off with women, children, ancestors, animals and camping equipment. These tribes, who arrived in the region of Morocco around the 12th-13th centuries, and later the Ma'qil in the 14th century, contributed to a more extensive ethnic, genetic, cultural, and linguistic Arabization of Morocco over time, especially beyond the major urban centres and the northern regions which had previously been the main sites of Arabization.

The Berber population mainly lives in the mountainous regions of Morocco where some preserve Berber culture, and are split into three major groups; Rifians, Shilha, Central Atlas Amazigh. other groups include Senhaja de Srair, Ghomara, Ait Iznassen, and Figuig Berbers. The Rifians inhabit the eastern Rif mountains, the Shilha inhabit the Anti-Atlas and Jbel Saghro and High Atlas mountains and the Sous valley, the Central Atlas Amazigh inhabit the Middle Atlas mountains. The Arabized Berbers who constitute about a quarter of the population are the Berbers who were Arabized mainly as a result of the Arab nomad inflow, and have adopted Arab culture and the Arabic language as their native language, especially those who sought the protection of the Bedouin. Some parts of the population are descendants of refugees who fled Spain after the Reconquista in the 15th century.

The Trans-Saharan slave trade brought a minority population of Sub-Saharan Africans to Morocco. After the founding of Israel and start of the Arab-Israeli conflict in 1948, many Jews felt compelled to leave Morocco and emigrate fled to Israel, Europe, and North America, and by 1967, 250,000 Jews left Morocco. According to a 2021 survey on 1,200 Moroccan adults, 68% were Arab, 25.6% were Berber, 3.6% were Sahrawi, and 2.7% were others.

=== Immigration ===
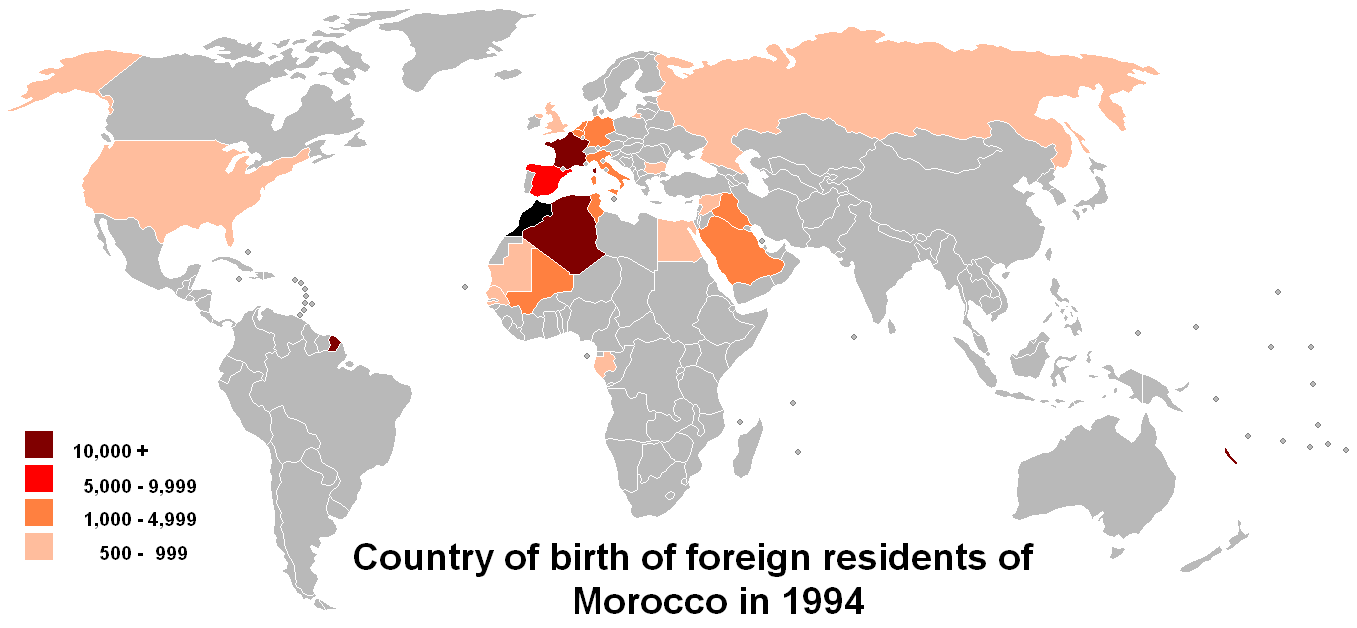
Foreign residents in Morocco by country of birth, in 1994

== Languages ==
Arabic and Berber are the official languages of Morocco. The majority spoken language in Morocco is Arabic which is spoken by 92.7% of the population and includes the dialects of Moroccan Arabic (Hilalian dialects), spoken by 91.9%, and Hassaniya Arabic, spoken by 0.8%. Berber languages are spoken by 24.8% of the population in three varieties (3.2% speak Tarifit, 14.2% speak Shilha, and 7.4% speak Tamazight). According to the 2024 Moroccan census, 99.2%, or almost the entire literate population of Morocco, could read and write in Arabic, while 1.5% of the population could read and write in Berber. The census also indicated that 80.6% of Moroccans consider Arabic to be their native language, while 18.9% regard any of the various Berber languages as their mother tongue.

French is a working-foreign language of government and enterprises, and is taught throughout school. It serves as Morocco's primary foreign language of business, economics, and scientific university education. French is also widely used in the media. Morocco is a member of La Francophonie.

Amazigh activists long-struggled for the recognition of their language as an official language of Morocco, which was achieved in July 2011. Northern Moroccans are often proficient in Spanish.

English is rapidly becoming a foreign language of choice among Moroccans. Since the State education reforms of 2002, English has been taught to Moroccan students, beginning in fourth year of primary school.
