= Demographics of Saudi Arabia =

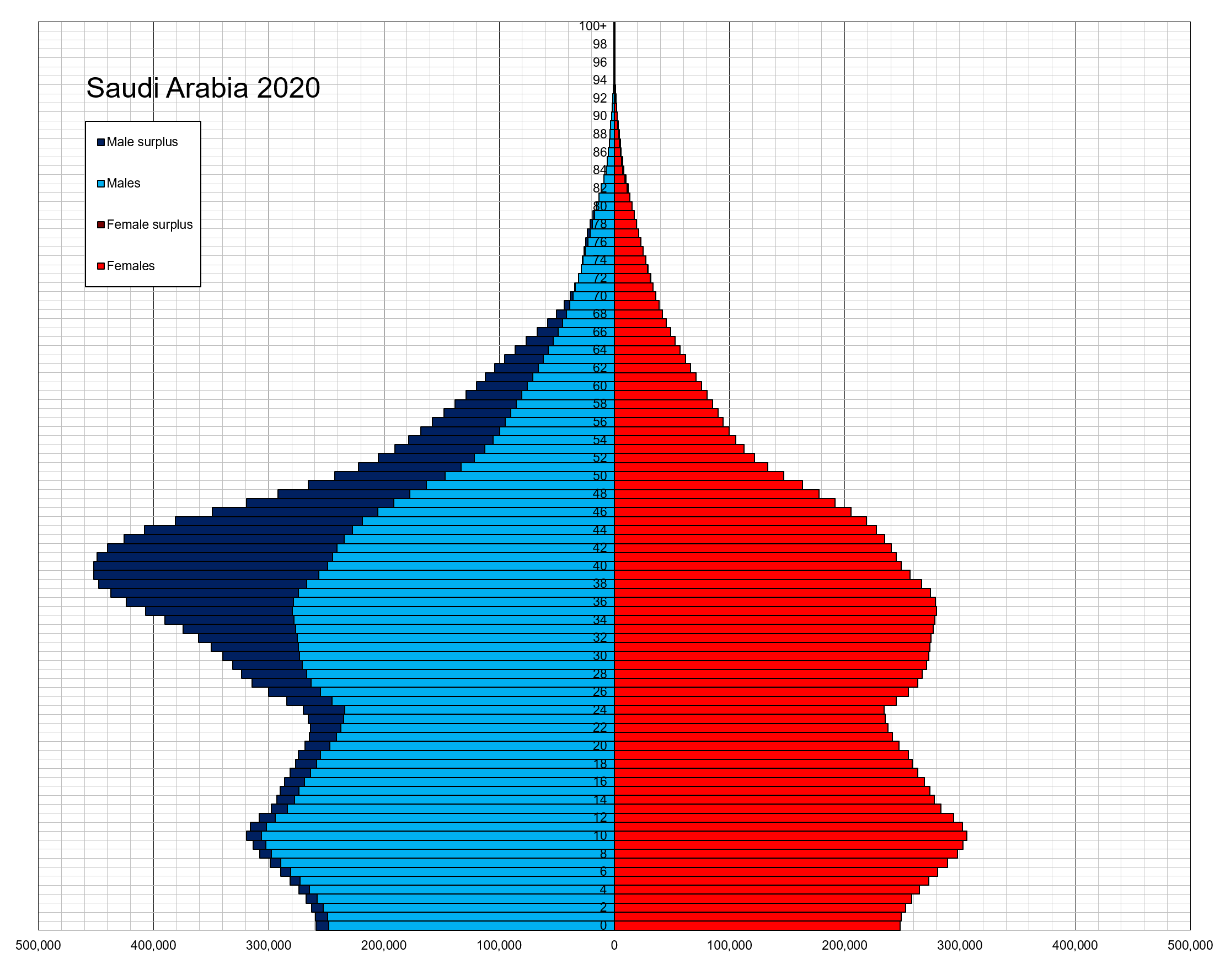
- Saudi Arabia population pyramid in 2020
- Population: 35,300,280 (Saudi Census 2024)
- Density: 14.967 people per sq. km of land (2022)
- Growth rate: 1.49% (2019)
- Birth rate: 13.9 births/1,000 population (2023)
- Death rate: 3.45 deaths/1,000 population
- Life expectancy: 76.91 years
  - male: 75.33 years
  - female: 78.56 years
- Fertility rate: 2.14 children born/woman, including 2.8 for Saudi citizens and 0.9 for non-Saudis (2022)
- Net migration rate: 590,000 (2017)
- Immigrant share: 40.3% (2024)

Age structure
- 0–14 years: 24.44%
- 15–64 years: 72.36%
- 65 and over: 3.20%

Nationality
- Nationality: Saudis
- Major ethnic: Arabs

Language
- Official: Arabic
- Spoken: Arabic

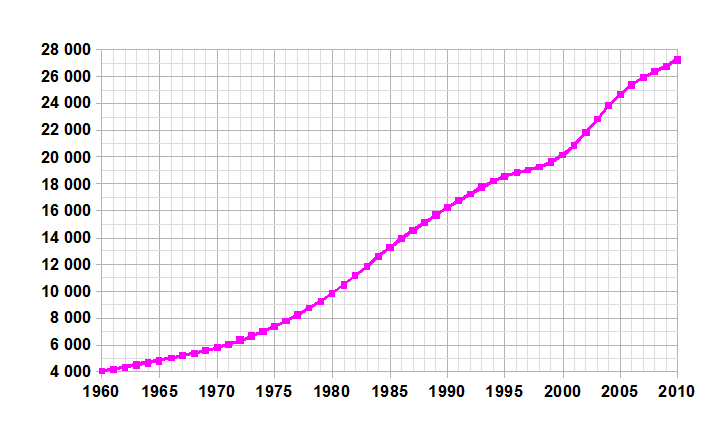
Demographics of Saudi Arabia, Data of FAO, year 2005; Number of inhabitants in thousands.

Saudi Arabia is the eight largest state in the Arab world, with a reported population of 35,300,280 as of 2024. 41.6% of inhabitants are immigrants. Saudi Arabia has experienced a population explosion in the last 40 years, and continues to grow at a rate of 1.62% per year.

Until the 1960s, most of the population was nomadic or semi-nomadic; due to rapid economic and urban growth, more than 95% of the population is now settled. 80% of Saudis live in ten major urban centers: Riyadh, Jeddah, Mecca, Medina, Hofuf, Ta'if, Buraydah, Khobar, Yanbu, Dhahran, and Dammam. Some cities and oases have densities of more than 1,000 people per square kilometer. Saudi Arabia's population is characterized by rapid growth, far more men than women, and a large cohort of youths.

Saudi Arabia hosts one of the pillars of Islam, which obliges all Muslims to make the Hajj, or pilgrimage to Mecca, at least once during their lifetime if they are able to do so. The cultural environment in Saudi Arabia is highly conservative; the country adheres to the interpretation of Islamic religious law (Sharia).

Most citizens of Saudi Arabia are ethnically Arabs, the majority of whom are tribal. However, more than 40% of Saudi Arabia's population are non-citizens. According to a random survey, most non-citizens living in Saudi Arabia come from the Indian Subcontinent and Arab countries. Many Arabs from nearby countries are employed in the country, particularly Egyptians, as the Egyptian community developed from the 1950s onwards. There also are significant numbers of Asian expatriates, mostly from India, Pakistan, Bangladesh, Indonesia, Philippines, Syria and Yemen. In the 1970s and 1980s, there was also a significant community of South Korean migrant labourers, numbering in the hundreds of thousands, but due to the rapid economic growth and development in South Korea, most have since returned home; the South Korean government's statistics showed only 1,200 of their nationals living in Saudi Arabia (most of them being professionals and business personnels) as of 2005. There are more than 100,000 Westerners in Saudi Arabia, most of whom live in private compounds in the major cities such as Riyadh, Jeddah, Yanbu and Dhahran. The government prohibits non-Muslims from entering the city of Mecca.

== Population ==
A graph showing the historical population of Saudi Arabia

Historical population
Year	Pop.	±% p.a.
0	1,000,000	—
600	2,500,000	+0.15%
1000	2,000,000	−0.06%
1500	2,000,000	+0.00%
1800	2,000,000	+0.00%
1900	2,140,000	+0.07%
1950	3,121,000	+0.76%
1960	4,041,000	+2.62%
1970	5,772,000	+3.63%
1980	9,801,000	+5.44%
1990	16,139,000	+5.11%
2000	20,045,000	+2.19%
2010	27,448,000	+3.19%
2020	32,013,414	+1.55%

As of 2022, the country had a reported population of 32,175,224.

=== Age structure ===
Population Estimates by Sex and Age Group (01.VII.2020) (Provisional Estimates):

Age Group	Male	Female	Total	%
Total	20 231 425	14 781 989	35 013 414	100%
0–4	1 477 523	1 421 656	2 899 179	8.28%
5–9	1 536 843	1 479 509	3 016 352	8.61%
10–14	1 343 659	1 297 303	2 640 962	7.54%
15–19	1 228 939	1 177 551	2 406 490	6.87%
20–24	1 429 072	1 248 976	2 678 048	7.65%
25–29	1 850 713	1 492 533	3 343 246	9.55%
30–34	2 002 357	1 393 121	3 395 478	9.70%
35–39	2 394 363	1 414 266	3 808 629	10.88%
40–44	2 181 209	1 227 215	3 408 424	9.73%
45–49	1 676 347	850 177	2 526 524	7.22%
50–54	1 208 823	549 702	1 758 525	5.02%
55–59	807 534	404 701	1 212 235	3.46%
60–64	500 209	296 964	797 173	2.28%
65–69	241 585	201 494	443 079	1.27%
70–74	153 697	140 182	293 879	0.84%
75–79	94 134	82 602	176 736	0.50%
80+	104 418	104 037	208 455	0.60%
Age group	Male	Female	Total	Percent
0–14	4 358 025	4 198 468	8 556 493	24.44%
15–64	15 279 566	10 055 206	25 334 772	72.36%
65+	593 834	528 315	1 122 149	3.20%

According to the CIA World Factbook the population of Saudi Arabia has a large young population ages 0–19 years and an increasing middle-age population ages 20–35 years. With a growing population reaching adulthood, global economists and the Saudi government have become concerned that there are more Saudis seeking jobs than are available. The nation has also seen a rise in its older population as life expectancy has risen throughout the last 40 years.

=== Density ===
Population Density: 16 people per km^{2} of land (2023).

=== Urbanization ===
The following data has been retrieved from the CIA World Factbook:

Urban population: 85% of total population (2023)

Rate of urbanization: 1.69% annual rate of change (2020–25 est.)

Historically, some of the population of Saudi Arabia followed a nomadic lifestyle, while most lived in villages and small towns run by emirs. Following the discovery of oil in the 1930s, the Kingdom became far more settled as people moved to centers of high economic activity. Significant population growth can be seen in the rise of urbanization throughout Saudi Arabia, which has grown 2 percent in the past ten years. The largest Saudi cities have become flooded with new residents as more people move to urban cities to find better employment opportunities, and overcrowding has become a major issue across the nation.

== Vital statistics ==
Births and deaths

Year	Population	Live births	Deaths	Natural change	Crude birth rate (per 1000)	Crude death rate (per 1000)	Natural change (per 1000)	Total Fertility Rate (TFR)	Saudi TFR	Non-Saudi TFR
2011	25,091,867	425,961	40,771	385,190	17.0	1.6	15.4	2.814	3.792	1.309
2012	26,168,861	430,568	42,400	388,168	16.5	1.6	14.9	2.797	3.735	1.370
2013	27,624,004	435,706	43,695	392,011	15.8	1.6	14.2	2.689	3.641	1.351
2014	28,309,273	450,239	45,263	404,976	15.9	1.6	14.3	2.695	3.625	1.380
2015	29,816,382	451,206	46,614	404,592	15.1	1.6	13.5	2.646	3.520	1.440
2016	30,954,198	457,531	49,416	408,115	14.8	1.6	13.2	2.665	3.470	1.577
2017	30,977,355	465,670	48,507	417,163	15.0	1.6	13.4	2.686	3.462	1.681
2018	30,196,281	464,287	48,201	416,086	15.4	1.6	13.8	2.683	3.383	1.659
2019	30,063,799	444,016	49,749	394,267	14.8	1.7	13.1	2.510	3.163	1.482
2020	31,552,510	430,393	50,822	379,571	13.6	1.6	12.0	2.289	2.985	1.167
2021	30,784,383	411,687	62,192	349,495	13.4	2.0	11.4	2.189	2.792	1.072
2022	32,175,224	417,155	56,799	360,356	13.0	1.8	11.2	2.135	2.798	0.905
2023	33,702,731							2.0	2.8	0.9
2024	35,300,280							2.0	2.7	0.8

Saudi Arabia is ranked 111th in comparison to the world with a birth rate of 18.51 births per 1,000 people in 2019. The nation's death rate is ranked 220th worldwide with 3.3 deaths per 1,000 people. Although birth rates have decreased in the last two decades, rates of decline fail to match the significant decline in death rates. Because of this, Saudi Arabia has experienced a population explosion in the last 40 years, and continues to grow at a rate of 1.63% per year. Saudi Arabia's population growth continues to be 0.295% higher than population growth rates in the Middle East and North Africa. Infant mortality rates have declined dramatically in the past twenty years from 25.3 deaths per 1,000 live births in 1995 to 6.3 deaths in 2017, according to the World Bank. Saudi Arabia has a substantially lower infant mortality rate in comparison to the Middle East and North Africa region, which continues to face a high of 19.3 deaths for every 1,000 live births as of 2017. This significant reduction can be attributed to rising access to modern healthcare across the country, ranking 26th worldwide for healthcare system quality. The construction of new hospitals and primary healthcare centers across the Kingdom, as well as healthcare during pregnancy and increased use of vaccinations account for a decline in infant mortality and increased life expectancy.

=== UN estimates ===
The Population Department of the United Nations prepared the following estimates. Population estimates account for under numeration in population censuses.

	Mid-year population	Live births	Deaths	Natural change	Crude birth rate (per 1000)	Crude death rate (per 1000)	Natural change (per 1000)	Crude migration rate (per 1000)	Total fertility rate (TFR)	Infant mortality (per 1000 live births)	Life expectancy (in years)
1950	3,090,000	165,000	77,000	88,000	53.3	24.8	28.5		7.58	196.4	40.99
1951	3,184,000	169,000	79,000	90,000	53.2	24.9	28.3	1.2	7.58	194.7	41.21
1952	3,279,000	174,000	80,000	93,000	52.9	24.5	28.4	0.6	7.58	191.4	41.73
1953	3,377,000	178,000	81,000	97,000	52.8	24.1	28.6	0.4	7.59	188.0	42.29
1954	3,478,000	183,000	82,000	100,000	52.5	23.7	28.8	0.2	7.59	184.7	42.84
1955	3,582,000	187,000	83,000	104,000	52.3	23.3	29.1	−0.1	7.59	181.5	43.33
1956	3,690,000	192,000	84,000	108,000	52.0	22.8	29.3	0	7.59	178.2	43.87
1957	3,802,000	197,000	85,000	112,000	51.9	22.3	29.5	0	7.60	175.0	44.41
1958	3,917,000	202,000	86,000	117,000	51.6	21.9	29.8	−0.4	7.60	171.7	44.88
1959	4,037,000	208,000	87,000	121,000	51.5	21.5	30.0	−0.3	7.62	168.5	45.34
1960	4,166,000	214,000	87,000	126,000	51.3	21.0	30.4	0.6	7.63	165.3	45.94
1961	4,306,000	220,000	88,000	132,000	51.2	20.5	30.7	1.8	7.63	162.0	46.48
1962	4,459,000	227,000	89,000	138,000	51.0	20.0	31.1	3.2	7.64	158.8	47.10
1963	4,622,000	235,000	90,000	145,000	51.0	19.5	31.5	3.8	7.65	155.4	47.61
1964	4,795,000	244,000	91,000	153,000	51.0	19.1	31.9	4.2	7.67	151.9	48.15
1965	4,979,000	252,000	92,000	160,000	50.8	18.5	32.2	4.8	7.66	148.1	48.78
1966	5,173,000	261,000	93,000	168,000	50.6	18.1	32.6	4.9	7.66	144.0	49.34
1967	5,381,000	271,000	94,000	178,000	50.6	17.5	33.1	5.6	7.66	139.5	50.05
1968	5,605,000	281,000	94,000	187,000	50.3	16.8	33.5	6.5	7.63	134.5	50.92
1969	5,845,000	291,000	94,000	198,000	50.0	16.1	33.9	7.2	7.60	129.2	51.82
1970	6,106,000	303,000	93,000	209,000	49.8	15.4	34.5	8.2	7.58	123.6	52.72
1971	6,397,000	315,000	93,000	223,000	49.6	14.6	35.0	10.5	7.56	117.8	53.77
1972	6,724,000	330,000	92,000	237,000	49.4	13.8	35.6	7.54	13	111.8	54.79
1973	7,089,000	345,000	91,000	253,000	49.0	13.0	36.0	15.5	7.48	105.6	55.93
1974	7,484,000	361,000	91,000	270,000	48.6	12.2	36.4	16.4	7.43	99.6	57.02
1975	7,898,000	378,000	90,000	287,000	48.2	11.5	36.7	15.7	7.37	94.1	58.07
1976	8,320,000	387,000	90,000	297,000	46.9	10.8	36.0	14.7	7.33	88.6	58.97
1977	8,755,000	397,000	88,000	309,000	45.7	10.1	35.6	14.1	7.30	83.5	59.95
1978	9,211,000	409,000	87,000	322,000	44.7	9.5	35.3	14.2	7.26	78.7	60.87
1979	9,682,000	422,000	86,000	336,000	43.9	8.9	35.0	13.6	7.23	74.1	61.70
1980	10,172,000	436,000	84,000	352,000	43.2	8.3	34.9	13.3	7.19	69.6	62.70
1981	10,678,000	450,000	83,000	367,000	42.5	7.8	34.6	12.8	7.13	65.4	63.47
1982	11,201,000	464,000	82,000	383,000	41.7	7.3	34.4	12.3	7.05	61.4	64.30
1983	11,746,000	478,000	81,000	398,000	41.0	6.9	34.1	12.3	6.95	57.6	65.05
1984	12,310,000	492,000	80,000	412,000	40.2	6.6	33.6	12.2	6.84	54.0	65.69
1985	12,890,000	504,000	80,000	424,000	39.3	6.2	33.1	11.9	6.70	50.6	66.33
1986	13,483,000	514,000	79,000	435,000	38.4	5.9	32.5	11.5	6.55	47.3	66.92
1987	14,090,000	523,000	79,000	444,000	37.3	5.6	31.7	11.4	6.36	44.1	67.40
1988	14,714,000	533,000	78,000	455,000	36.4	5.3	31.1	11.3	6.17	41.1	67.97
1989	15,353,000	541,000	77,000	463,000	35.4	5.1	30.4	11.2	6.00	38.3	68.49
1990	16,005,000	547,000	77,000	470,000	34.4	4.8	29.6	11.1	5.83	35.6	68.95
1991	16,654,000	554,000	77,000	477,000	33.4	4.7	28.8	10.2	5.66	33.1	69.37
1992	17,281,000	558,000	76,000	482,000	32.4	4.4	28.0	8.3	5.49	30.9	69.93
1993	17,846,000	563,000	76,000	487,000	31.5	4.3	27.3	4.4	5.32	28.8	70.30
1994	18,368,000	564,000	75,000	489,000	30.8	4.1	26.7	1.7	5.14	26.9	70.71
1995	18,889,000	566,000	75,000	491,000	30.0	4.0	26.0	1.6	4.95	25.2	71.01
1996	19,410,000	570,000	75,000	495,000	29.4	3.9	25.5	1.3	4.77	23.6	71.27
1997	19,938,000	576,000	76,000	500,000	28.9	3.8	25.1	1.4	4.59	22.1	71.48
1998	20,473,000	582,000	75,000	507,000	28.5	3.7	24.8	1.3	4.42	20.8	71.88
1999	21,010,000	588,000	75,000	513,000	28.0	3.6	24.4	1,2	4.25	19.6	72.14
2000	21,547,000	596,000	75,000	521,000	27.7	3.5	24.2	0.7	4.12	18.5	72.47
2001	22,086,000	593,000	73,000	519,000	26.9	3.3	23.5	0.9	3.91	17.5	72.97
2002	22,623,000	586,000	73,000	513,000	25.9	3.2	22.7	1	3.71	16.5	73.34
2003	23,151,000	574,000	72,000	502,000	24.8	3.1	21.7	1.1	3.50	15.6	73.63
2004	23,662,000	563,000	70,000	493,000	23.8	3.0	20.8	0.8	3.34	14.8	74.15
2005	24,398,000	557,000	70,000	487,000	23.1	2.9	20.2	10	3.24	14.0	74.59
2006	25,383,000	581,000	70,000	511,000	23.1	2.8	20.3	18.5	3.21	13.2	74.81
2007	26,400,000	608,000	71,000	537,000	23.2	2.7	20.5	18	3.18	12.5	75.05
2008	27,437,000	619,000	72,000	547,000	22.7	2.6	20.1	17.7	3.06	11.8	75.27
2009	28,484,000	630,000	73,000	557,000	22.3	2.6	19.7	17.1	2.95	11.2	75.43
2010	29,412,000	641,000	73,000	568,000	21.9	2.5	19.4	12.2	2.85	10.5	75.76
2011	30,151,000	651,000	73,000	579,000	21.6	2.4	19.2	5.3	2.81	9.8	76.23
2012	30,822,000	654,000	74,000	580,000	21.2	2.4	18.8	3	2.78	9.3	76.46
2013	31,482,000	653,000	77,000	576,000	20.8	2.4	18.3	2.7	2.74	8.8	76.63
2014	32,126,000	647,000	80,000	567,000	20.2	2.5	17.7	2.3	2.69	8.2	76.76
2015	32,750,000	639,000	83,000	556,000	19.5	2.5	17.0	2.1	2.64	7.8	76.92
2016	33,416,000	632,000	87,000	545,000	19.0	2.6	16.4	3.5	2.59	7.3	77.06
2017	34,193,000	644,000	90,000	554,000	18.9	2.6	16.3	6.4	2.58	6.9	77.16
2018	35,018,000	653,000	93,000	560,000	18.7	2.7	16.0	7.6	2.55	6.6	77.21
2019	35,827,000	659,000	95,000	564,000	18.5	2.7	15.8	6.8	2.50	6.3	77.30
2020	35,997,000	666,000	106,000	560,000	18.2	2.9	15.3	−10.6	2.47	6.0	76.24
2021	35,950,000	629,000	103,000	526,000	17.5	2.9	14.6	−15.9	2.43	5.7	76.94

View source data.
View source data.
View source data.
View source data.

=== Fertility ===
Years	1925	1926	1927	1928	1929	1930	1931	1932	1933	1934
Total Fertility Rate in Saudi Arabia	6.86	6.87	6.89	6.90	6.91	6.93	6.94	6.96	6.97	6.98

Years	1935	1936	1937	1938	1939	1940	1941	1942	1943	1944
Total Fertility Rate in Saudi Arabia	7.00	7.01	7.02	7.04	7.05	7.06	7.08	7.09	7.10	7.12

Years	1945	1946	1947	1948	1949
Total Fertility Rate in Saudi Arabia	7.13	7.15	7.16	7.17	7.19

=== Life expectancy at birth ===
Life expectancy in Saudi Arabia

The following data has been retrieved from the CIA World Factbook as of 2018.

Total population:

Male: 74.2 years.

Female: 77.3 years.

== Nationality and ethnicity ==
Ethnic makeup of Saudi citizens in Saudi Arabia
Ethnic groups
Arabs	90%
Afro-Arabs	10%

The ethnic composition of Saudi citizens is 90% Arabs and 10% Afro-Arabs, though there still are smaller numbers of Indians, Pakistanis, and Turks in Saudi Arabia. However, 38.3% of the residents (or about 13.3 million people) are non-citizens, and many of them are migrant workers.

== Languages ==
The official language of Saudi Arabia is Arabic. Saudi Sign Language is the principal language of the deaf community. The large expatriate communities also speak their own languages, the most numerous of which are Urdu (4,000,000) which after Arabic is widely used especially among the South Asian community, which makes the largest community of expatriate, Bengali (2,500,000), Indonesian (850,000), Filipino/Tagalog (700,000), Malayalam (447,000), Rohingya (400,000), Telugu (388,888), and Egyptian Arabic (300,000).

== Religion ==
Religions of Saudi Arabia (2012)
Religions	percent
Sunni Islam	90%
Shia Islam	10%

The government does not ask about religion on their census surveys. However, according to official statistics, in 2020, 85–90% of Saudi Arabian citizens were Sunni Muslims, 10–12% are Shia. The rest are other forms of Islamic minorities. Other smaller communities reside in the south, with Ismaili Shia's constituting around half of the population of the province of Nejran, and a small percentage of the Holy Islamic cities of Mecca and Medina.

In 2022, there is a Christian population in the country of approximately 2.1 million; there are also groups of Hindus, Buddhists and Sikhs in the country.

According to a poll in 2013 by WIN-Gallup International, 5% of 502 Saudi Arabians surveyed stated they were "convinced atheists". While there is no penal code in Saudi Arabia that prohibits it, apostasy (the renunciation of a religion) may be punishable by death under Saudi Sharia law.

In 2022, the Kingdom's total population was approximately 35 million; it was estimated that of these, over one-third were foreign workers.

== Migration ==
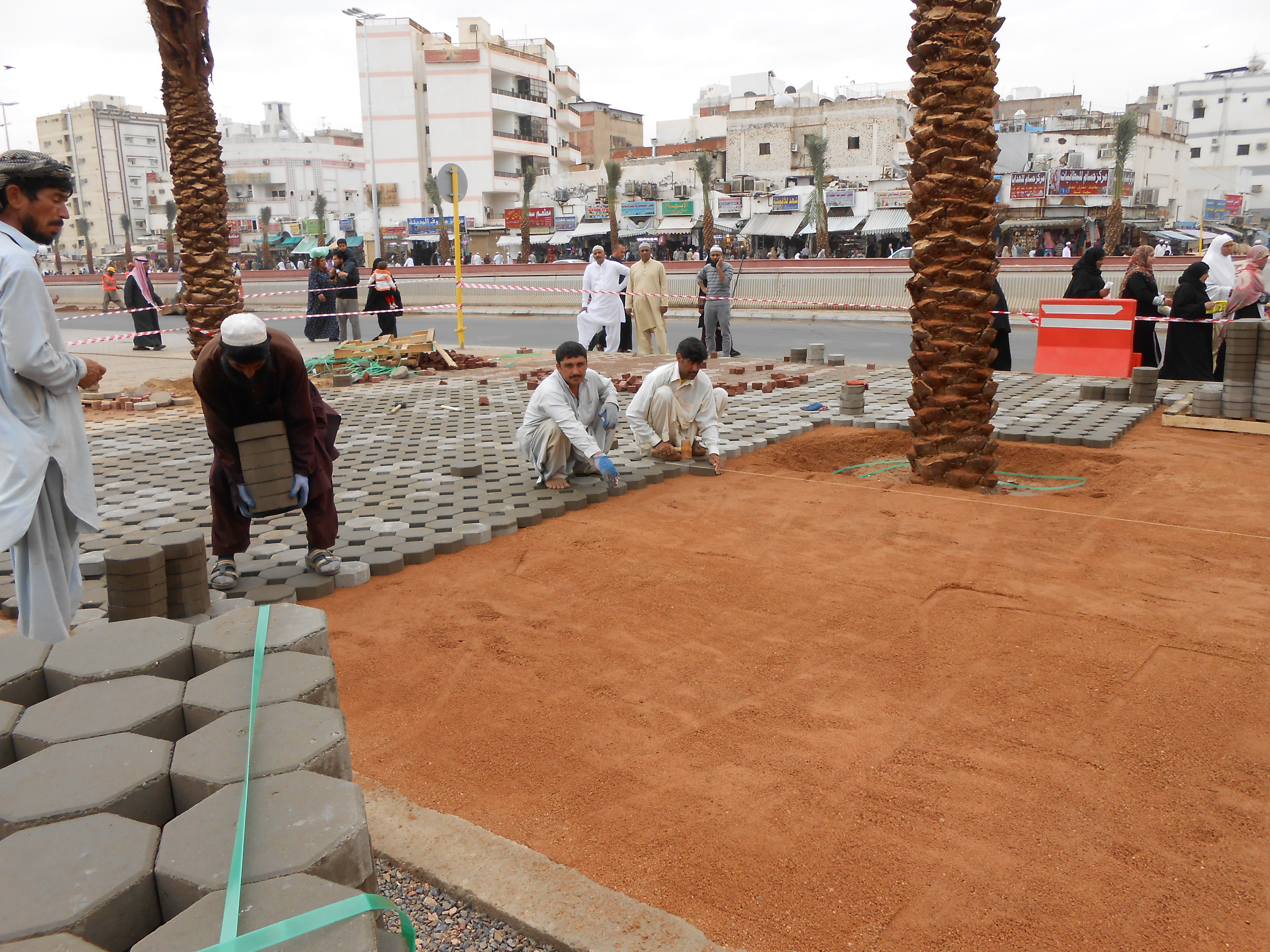
Pakistani workers at Al Masjid Nabawi (the Prophet's Mosque) in Medina

Migration is a significant part of Saudi Arabia's tradition and culture, as the nation's thriving oil economy attracts large numbers of foreign workers from an assortment of countries throughout Asia and the Arab world. Following economic diversification in response to the oil boom of the 1970s, the Saudi government encouraged skilled and semi-skilled workers to enter the Kingdom as the demand for infrastructure and development intensified. Saudi Arabia is among the top five immigrant destination countries around the world, currently hosting 5.3 million international migrants in its borders. In 2017, non-native residents accounted for 38% of the Kingdom's total population, more than twice that of the United States whose immigrants make up 15% of the nation's total population. The majority of Saudi Arabia's foreign born population are males between the ages of 25 and 45. These immigrants make up a larger percentage of the total population in this age group compared to native-born Saudis ages 25–45, according to the United Nations 2013 report. 26.3% of the total migrant population in Saudi Arabia are from India, followed by Pakistan (24.2%), Bangladesh (19.5%), Egypt (19.3%), and finally the Philippines (15.3%). Most immigrants of the Kingdom are skilled, unskilled, and service industry foreign workers. Although the living and working conditions for immigrant workers are harsh in Saudi Arabia, economic opportunity tends to be much greater than in their homelands. There are around five million illegal immigrants in Saudi Arabia, most of which come from Africa and Asia. These immigrants are planned to be deported within the next few years. There are over 118,000 Westerners in Saudi Arabia, most of whom live in compounds or gated communities.

=== Population by citizenship ===
In the 2022 Saudi Arabia Census, 41.6% of the population had a foreign background.

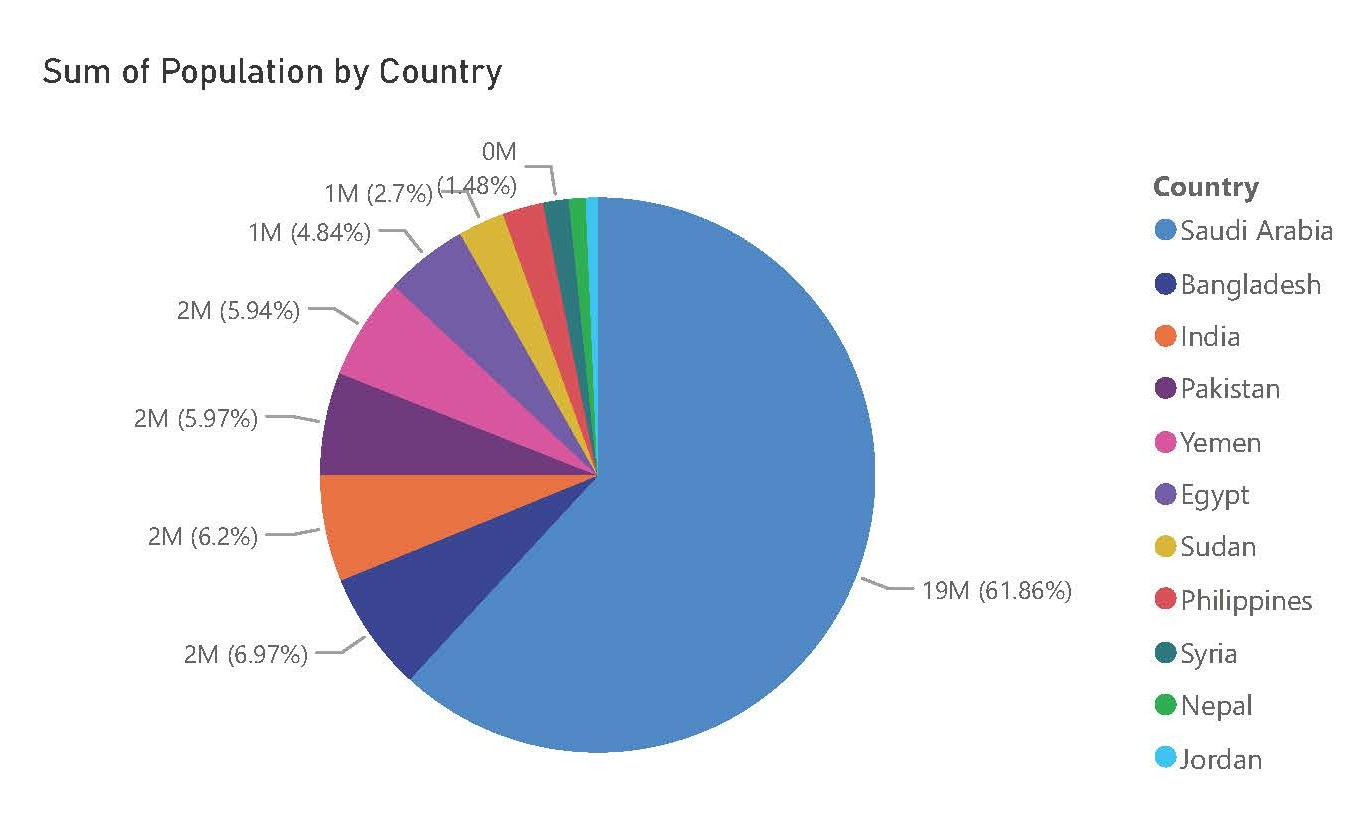
Top 10 nationalities living in Saudi Arabia

Population by citizenship (2022 Statistical Census)
Rank	Country	Population
0	Saudi Arabia	18,792,268
1	Bangladesh	2,116,200
2	India	1,884,500
3	Pakistan	1,814,700
4	Yemen	1,803,500
5	Egypt	1,471,400
6	Sudan	819,600
7	Philippines	725,900
8	Syria	449,300
9	Nepal	297,600
10	Jordan	204,200
11	Indonesia	175,300
12	Myanmar	163,700
13	Ethiopia	159,200
14	Afghanistan	132,300
15	Palestine	129,900
16	Uganda	127,900
17	Kenya	91,800
18	Sri Lanka	84,800
19	Nigeria	79,500
20	Lebanon	52,800
21	Kuwait	50,300
22	Morocco	48,800
23	Eritrea	47,300
24	Chad	46,200
25	Somalia	45,700
26	Mali	38,400
27	Niger	33,600
28	Turkey	25,800
29	Tunisia	24,800
30	United States	20,500
31	Mauritania	18,000
32	United Kingdom	17,900
33	Bahrain	16,700
34	China	14,600
35	Ghana	14,200
36	Canada	11,300
37	Algeria	9,700
38	United Arab Emirates	8,300
39	Qatar	7,100
40	Malaysia	6,700
41	Iraq	6,500
42	Thailand	6,300
43	Brunei	6,000
44	France	5,200
45	Burkina Faso	5,000
46	South Africa	4,900
47	Oman	3,700
48	Senegal	2,800
49	Vietnam	2,700
50	Australia	2,600
51	Russia	2,200
52	Spain	1,800
53	Germany	1,700
54	Djibouti	1,700
55	South Korea	1,700
56	Italy	1,500
57	Cameroon	1,400
58	Guinea	1,400
59	Ireland	1,300
60	Madagascar	1,300
61	Tanzania	1,300
62	Ivory Coast	1,100
63	Taiwan	1,000
64	Venezuela	1,000
65	Gambia	950
66	Brazil	950
67	Greece	900
68	Netherlands	850
69	Uzbekistan	800
70	Ukraine	800
71	Kyrgyzstan	750
72	Kazakhstan	700
73	Libya	700
74	Azerbaijan	600
75	Romania	600
76	Colombia	600
77	Tajikistan	600
78	Benin	550
79	Portugal	550
80	Sweden	500
	Total	32,175,224
