= Demographics of the United States Virgin Islands =

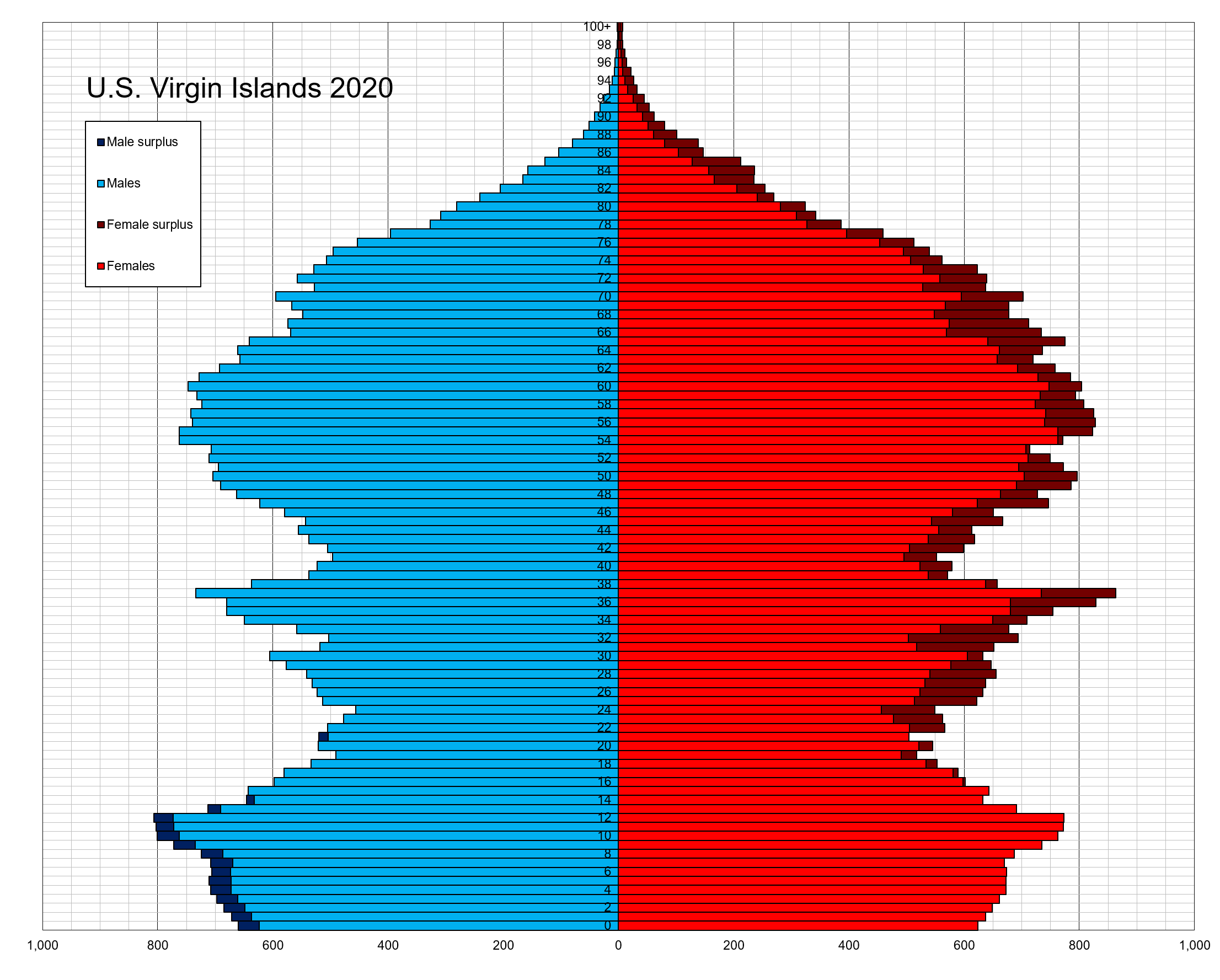
United States Virgin Islands population pyramid in 2020

This is a demography of the population of the United States Virgin Islands including population density, ethnicity, education level, health of the populace, economic status, religious affiliations and other aspects of the population.

Census population and average annual growth rate
Year	Pop.	±% p.a.
1901	30,527	—
1911	27,086	−1.19%
1917	26,051	−0.65%
1930	22,012	−1.29%
1940	24,889	+1.24%
1950	26,665	+0.69%
1960	32,099	+1.87%
1970	62,468	+6.88%
1980	96,569	+4.45%
1990	101,809	+0.53%
2000	108,612	+0.65%
2010	106,405	−0.21%
2020	87,146	−1.98%

== Population ==
According to the 2020 U.S. census, the population of the U.S. Virgin Islands was 87,146, a decrease from 106,405 in 2010. In 2020, the median age was 45.9 years, compared to 39.2 years in 2010.

=== Structure of the population ===
Population by sex and age group (Census 01.IV.2010) (including armed forces stationed in the area):

Age group	Male	Female	Total	%
Total	50 854	55 551	106 405	100
0–4	3 736	3 764	7 500	7.05
5–9	3 694	3 456	7 150	6.72
10–14	3 849	3 635	7 484	7.03
15–19	3 765	3 795	7 560	7.10
20–24	2 707	3 187	5 894	5.54
25–29	2 695	3 274	5 969	5.61
30–34	2 825	3 312	6 137	5.77
35–39	3 133	3 542	6 675	6.27
40–44	3 506	3 944	7 450	7.00
45–49	3 680	4 063	7 743	7.28
50–54	3 800	4 100	7 900	7.42
55–59	3 341	3 851	7 192	6.76
60–64	3 510	3 857	7 367	6.92
65–69	2 883	2 970	5 853	5.50
70–74	1 739	1 978	3 717	3.49
75–79	1 043	1 285	2 328	2.19
80–84	568	764	1 332	1.25
85+	380	774	1 154	1.08
Age group	Male	Female	Total	Percent
0–14	11 279	10 855	22 134	20.80
15–64	32 962	36 925	69 887	65.68
65+	6 613	7 771	14 384	13.52

== Vital statistics ==
	Average population (x 1000)	Live births	Deaths	Natural change	Crude birth rate (per 1000)	Crude death rate (per 1000)	Natural change (per 1000)	Total fertility rate
1932	23	553	454	99	24.0	19.7	4.3	
1933	23	578	481	97	25.1	20.9	4.2	
1934	23	657	419	238	28.6	18.2	10.3	
1935	24	656	492	164	27.3	20.5	6.8	
1936	24	664	471	193	27.7	19.6	8.0	
1937	24	725	498	227	30.2	20.8	9.5	
1938	24	703	488	215	29.3	20.3	9.0	
1939	25	787	460	327	31.5	18.4	13.1	
1940	25	756	553	203	30.2	22.1	8.1	
1941	26	829	468	361	31.9	18.0	13.9	
1942	26	889	483	406	34.2	18.6	15.6	
1943	27	931	389	542	34.5	14.4	20.1	
1944	27	1 059	402	657	39.2	14.9	24.3	
1945	27	984	401	583	36.4	14.9	21.6	
1946	27	917	408	509	34.0	15.1	18.9	
1947	27	876	394	482	32.4	14.6	17.9	
1948	27	826	340	486	30.6	12.6	18.0	
1949	27	886	362	524	32.8	13.4	19.4	
1950	27	894	374	520	33.4	14.0	19.4	
1951	27	953	375	578	34.9	13.7	21.2	
1952	28	862	346	516	30.8	12.4	18.4	
1953	29	871	279	592	30.4	9.8	20.7	
1954	29	879	301	578	30.2	10.3	19.9	
1955	29	913	311	602	31.1	10.6	20.5	
1956	29	977	354	623	33.1	12.0	21.1	
1957	30	1 038	324	714	35.0	10.9	24.1	
1958	30	1 129	340	789	37.6	11.3	26.3	
1959	31	1 107	320	787	35.8	10.3	25.4	
1960	33	1 180	332	848	36.2	10.2	26.0	
1961	35	1 193	326	867	33.9	9.3	24.6	
1962	39	1 375	321	1 054	35.7	8.3	27.4	
1963	42	1 513	383	1 130	35.8	9.1	26.7	
1964	46	1 762	343	1 419	38.2	7.4	30.8	
1965	50	1 998	416	1 582	40.3	8.4	31.9	
1966	53	1 956	388	1 568	37.2	7.4	29.8	
1967	55	2 272	373	1 899	41.1	6.7	34.4	
1968	58	2 350	474	1 876	40.6	8.2	32.4	
1969	61	2 529	476	2 053	41.7	7.8	33.8	
1970	64	2 920	469	2 451	45.6	7.3	38.3	
1971	68	2 909	538	2 371	42.7	7.9	34.8	
1972	73	2 881	539	2 342	39.7	7.4	32.3	
1973	77	2 667	496	2 171	34.5	6.4	28.1	
1974	82	2 584	485	2 099	31.6	5.9	25.7	
1975	86	2 561	477	2 084	29.9	5.6	24.3	
1976	89	2 530	512	2 018	28.4	5.7	22.6	
1977	92	2 513	408	2 105	27.3	4.4	22.9	
1978	94	2 524	504	2 020	26.7	5.3	21.4	
1979	96	2 389	500	1 889	24.8	5.2	19.6	
1980	98	2 504	500	2 004	25.4	5.1	20.4	
1981	100	2 442	548	1 894	24.4	5.5	18.9	
1982	102	2 509	522	1 987	24.6	5.1	19.5	
1983	103	2 600	506	2 094	25.2	4.9	20.3	
1984	104	2 452	507	1 945	23.5	4.9	18.7	
1985	105	2 402	547	1 855	22.9	5.2	17.7	
1986	105	2 288	508	1 780	21.9	4.9	17.0	
1987	104	2 375	558	1 817	22.8	5.3	17.4	
1988	104	2 315	549	1 766	22.3	5.3	17.0	
1989	103	2 418	548	1 870	23.4	5.3	18.1	
1990	103	2 401	511	1 890	23.3	4.9	18.3	
1991	104	2 511	538	1 973	24.2	5.2	19.0	
1992	104	2 613	539	2 074	25.0	5.2	19.9	
1993	105	2 529	569	1 960	24.0	5.4	18.6	
1994	106	2 468	595	1 873	23.2	5.6	17.6	
1995	107	2 170	661	1 509	20.3	6.2	14.1	
1996	108	2 001	558	1 443	18.6	5.2	13.4	
1997	108	2 124	607	1 517	19.7	5.6	14.0	
1998	108	1 913	615	1 298	17.7	5.7	12.0	
1999	108	1 671	659	1 012	15.4	6.1	9.3	
2000	109	1 564	641	923	14.4	5.9	8.5	
2001	109	1 668	617	1 051	15.4	5.7	9.7	
2002	108	1 634	617	1 017	15.1	5.7	9.4	
2003	108	1 610	615	995	14.9	5.7	9.2	
2004	108	1 672	628	1 044	15.5	5.8	9.7	
2005	108	1 686	674	1 012	15.6	6.3	9.4	
2006	107	1 687	624	1 063	15.7	5.8	9.9	
2007	107	1 697	703	994	15.8	6.6	9.3	
2008	107	1 784	749	1 035	16.7	7.0	9.7	
2009	107	1 687	675	1 012	15.8	6.3	9.5	
2010	106	1 600	715	885	15.0	6.7	8.3	
2011	106	1 491			14.0			
2012	106	1 415	723	692	13.4	6.9	6.5	
2015		1 325	673	652	12.8	6.5	6.3	2.23
2016		1 187	632	555	11.0	5.9	5.1	1.80
2020		876	701	175	8.2	6.6	1.6	1.394
2021		903	747	156	8.5	7.1	1.4	1.458
2022		868			8.2			1.427
2023		823			7.8			1.368
2024		803			7.7			1.366

The infant mortality rate as of 2010 is 7.4 deaths/1,000 live births: 8.14 deaths/1,000 live births for males and 6.63 deaths/1,000 live births for females. At birth, life expectancy is 79.61 years (76.57 for males, 82.83 for females or girls).

== Race and ethnicity ==
Race	Percent
Black or African American	71.4%
White	13.3%
Asian	1.0%
American Indian and Alaska Native	0.4%
Native Hawaiian and other Pacific Islander	0.1%
Some other race	6.3%
Two or more races	7.5%

Hispanic or Latino origin	Percent
Hispanic or Latino (of any race)	18.4%
Not Hispanic or Latino	81.6%

== Place of birth ==
As of the 2020 census: 47.0% of the population were born in the U.S. Virgin Islands; 15.5% were born in the United States; 2.6% were born in other U.S. Island area or Puerto Rico; and 34.8% were born elsewhere. Of those born elsewhere: 90.7% were born in the Caribbean; 3.4% were born in Asia; 2.4% were born in Europe; 2.0% were born in Central America; and 1.4% were born elsewhere.

Location	(more specific location)	Percentage
U.S. Virgin Islands		47.0%
United States		15.5%
Latin America and the Caribbean	St. Kitts and Nevis	5.4%
Latin America and the Caribbean	Dominica	5.1%
Latin America and the Caribbean	Dominican Republic	4.8%
Latin America and the Caribbean	Antigua and Barbuda	3.4%
Latin America and the Caribbean	St. Lucia	3.4%
Latin America and the Caribbean	Haiti	2.3%
Latin America and the Caribbean	British Virgin Islands	1.7%
Latin America and the Caribbean	Trinidad and Tobago	1.5%
Latin America and the Caribbean	Anguilla	0.8%
Latin America and the Caribbean	Jamaica	0.5%
Latin America and the Caribbean	Other Latin American and the Caribbean	2.3%
Other U.S. Island area or Puerto Rico		2.6%
Asia		1.2%
Europe		0.8%
Other		0.5%

== Religion ==
In terms of religion:

- Protestant 59%
  - Baptist 42%
  - Episcopalian 17%
- Roman Catholic Church 34%
- Other 7%

== Language ==
As of the 2020 Decennial Census of Island Areas, 69.8% of the population of the U.S. Virgin Islands (5 years and over in households) speak only English at home; 17.2% speak Spanish; 8.8% speak French, Haitian, or Cajun; and 4.2% speak a different language at home. 91.0% of residents were fluent in English.

== See also ==
- United States Virgin Islander citizenship and nationality
- Stateside Virgin Islands Americans
