= Danish nationality law =

Danish Citizenship Act Lov om dansk indfødsret

Folketing
- Citation: Lov nr. 252 af 27.05.1950
- Territorial extent: Danish Realm
- Enacted: 27 May 1950
- Assented to by: King Frederik IX
- Royal assent: 27 May 1950
- Status: Amended

The primary law governing nationality of Denmark is the Danish Citizenship Act (Danish: Lov om dansk indfødsret), which came into force on 27 May 1950. Regulations apply to the entire Danish Realm, which includes the country of Denmark itself, the Faroe Islands, and Greenland.

Denmark is a member state of the European Union (EU), and all Danish nationals are EU citizens. They are entitled to free movement rights in EU and European Free Trade Association (EFTA) countries, and may vote in elections to the European Parliament.

Danish nationality can be acquired in one of the following ways:

- Automatically at birth if either parent is a Danish citizen, regardless of birthplace, if the child was born on or after 1 July 2014.
- Automatically if a person is adopted as a child under 12 years of age
- By declaration for natural-born nationals of another Nordic country who have resided in Denmark for at least 7 years
- By naturalisation, via the Folketing passing a law declaring a person to be a Citizen (which is the only legal way to naturalise a foreigner according to Article 44 of the Constitution)

In December 2018, the law on Danish citizenship was changed so that a handshake was mandatory during the ceremony. The regulation was made in an attempt to target members of the Islamist group Hizb ut-Tahrir from receiving Danish citizenship, since many of them refuse to shake hands with individuals of the opposite sex.

== Loss of Danish nationality ==
- Automatically at age 22 if a person acquired Danish nationality by birth, but was not born in the Kingdom of Denmark unless:
  - this would render the person stateless
  - the person has lived in Finland, Iceland, Norway or Sweden for an aggregate period of no less than 7 years
  - the person stayed in Denmark continuously for 3 months while registered on the Det Centrale Personregister
  - the person visited Denmark for a total length of approximately 1 year under circumstances indicating some association with Denmark and the person has a working knowledge of the Danish language
  - an individual review of effects in relation to EU law of a loss of EU citizenship as a result of losing Danish nationality outweighs the reasons to remove Danish nationality
- By court order if a person acquired his or her Danish nationality by fraudulent conduct, for example a sham marriage
- By court order if a person is convicted of violation of one or more provisions of Parts 12 and 13 of the Danish Criminal Code (crimes against national security), unless this would render the person stateless
- By voluntary application to the Minister for Refugee, Immigration and Integration Affairs (a person who is or who desires to become a national of a foreign country may be released from his or her Danish nationality by such an application)

== Naturalisation as a Danish citizen ==
The Folketing decides who is naturalised and passes a law naming those people. The general guidelines as agreed between the political parties are:

- Applicants must have been continuously resident in Denmark for at least 9 years, of which at least the last 2 years must have been as a Permanent Resident.
  - Nordic citizens of Sweden, Norway, Finland or Iceland require 2 years of continuous residence instead of 9, and do not need to be Permanent Residents.
  - There is an exception for interrupted residence of up to 2 years in special circumstances (education, family illness).
  - Persons who are stateless or who have refugee status require 8 years of continuous residence instead of 9
  - Persons who received a substantial part of their general or professional education in Denmark require 5 years of continuous residence instead of 9
  - Each year of marriage to a Danish citizen reduces the continuous residence requirement by one year, up to a maximum reduction of 3 years.
  - Absences from the Kingdom of Denmark of longer than 2 years are permitted for applicants married to a Danish citizen subject to the following special criteria:
    - The applicants total period of continuous residence should be at least 3 years
    - The applicants total period of continuous residence must exceed the total periods of absence
    - The applicants period of marriage must be at least 2 years, or the applicants total period of residence in the Kingdom of Denmark must be at least 10 years, minus the period of marriage and further minus up to 1 extra year if the applicant and their Danish spouse lived together before marriage.
  - An applicant married to a Dane working 'for Danish interests' in a foreign country can have their period of absence while living in another country with their Spouse under these circumstances counted as if they were resident in Denmark.

Applicants may be exempted from some, or all of these requirements by the Folketing Naturalization Committee. Decisions on exemptions are considered political questions.

According to Statistics Denmark, 3,267 foreigners living in Denmark replaced their foreign citizenship with Danish citizenship in 2012. A total of 71.4% of all those who were naturalized in 2012 were from the non-Western world. Half of all new Danish citizenships in 2012 were given to people from Iraq, Afghanistan, Turkey, Somalia and Iran.

=== Crime ===
Immigrants who have committed crimes may be denied Danish citizenship. For instance, immigrants who have received a prison sentence of one year or more, or at least three months for crimes against a person cannot receive citizenship. Convictions which have resulted in a fine also carries with it a time period for immigrants, where citizenship applications are rejected up to 4.5 years after the fine. Upon several offences, the period is extended by 3 years.

In April 2021, the Mette Frederiksen Cabinet approved regulation which stops awarding citizenship to foreigners who had received a prison sentence in court which also encompassed suspended prison sentences. Previously, awarding citizenship was possible for foreigners with a prison sentence of less than a year.

== Dual citizenship ==
In October 2011, the newly elected centre-left coalition government indicated its intention to permit dual citizenship.

On 18 December 2014, Parliament passed a bill to allow Danish citizens to become foreign nationals without losing their Danish citizenship, and to allow foreign nationals to acquire Danish citizenship without renouncing their prior citizenship. A provision in the bill also allows former Danish nationals who lost their citizenship as a result of accepting another to reobtain Danish citizenship. This provision was due to expire in 2020 but has been prolonged to 1 July 2026. A separate provision, lasting until 2017, allowed current applicants for Danish citizenship who have been approved under the condition they renounce their prior citizenship to retain their prior nationality as they become Danish citizens. The law came into force on 1 September 2015.

Anyone with Danish (or other) citizenship may be required by a country of which they are also citizens to give up their other (Danish) citizenship, although this cannot be enforced outside the jurisdiction of the country in question. For example Japan does not permit multiple citizenship, while Argentina has no restrictions.

== EU citizenship ==
In 1992 Danish voters rejected the Maastricht Treaty. In 1993 Danish voters approved the four opt-outs as stipulated in the Edinburgh agreement including the opt-out for citizenship of the European Union.

=== Denmark ===
Danish citizens residing in Denmark proper are also citizens of the European Union under European Union law and thus enjoy rights of free movement and have the right to vote in elections for the European Parliament. When in a non-EU country where there is no Danish embassy, Danish citizens have the right to get consular protection from the embassy of any other EU country present in that country. Danish citizens can live and work in any country within the EU as a result of the right of free movement and residence granted in Article 21 of the EU Treaty.

=== Greenland ===
Greenland joined the European Economic Community along with Denmark proper in 1973 but left in 1985. Although Greenland is not part of the European Union, it remains associated with the EU through its OCT-status. Since Greenlanders hold Danish citizenship they enjoy the same rights as other Danish citizens regarding freedom of movement in the EU. This allows Greenlanders to move and reside freely within the EU.

=== Faroe Islands ===
The Faroe Islands have never been part of the EU or its predecessors, and EU treaties do not apply to the islands. Consequently, Danish citizens residing in the Faroe Islands are not EU citizens within the meaning of the treaties. However, they can choose between a non-EU Danish-Faroese passport (which is green and modelled on pre-EU Danish passport) or a regular Danish EU passport. Some EU member states may treat Danish citizens residing in the Faroe Islands the same as other Danish citizens and thus as EU citizens.

Concerning citizenship of the European Union as established in the Maastricht Treaty, Denmark proper obtained an opt-out in the Edinburgh Agreement, in which EU citizenship does not replace national citizenship and each member state is free to determine its nationals according to its own nationality law. The Amsterdam Treaty extends this to all EU member states, which renders the Danish opt-out de facto meaningless.

== Travel freedom of Danish citizens ==
Visa requirements for Danish citizens

Visa requirements for Danish citizens are administrative entry restrictions by the authorities of other states placed on citizens of the Kingdom of Denmark. In May 2018, Danish citizens had visa-free or visa-on-arrival access to 185 countries and territories, ranking the Danish passport 5th in the world according to the Henley visa restrictions index.

The Danish nationality is ranked fourth in The Quality of Nationality Index (QNI). This index differs from the Henley Passport Index, which focuses on external factors including travel freedom. The QNI considers, besides travel freedom, internal factors such as peace & stability, economic strength, and human development as well.

== Dual citizenship ==
Historically, the Nordic countries did not approve of dual nationality; as such, Danish citizens were historically required to renounce their citizenship before being allowed to obtain citizenship in another country, and naturalized Danish citizens were likewise required to renounce their other citizenships. While the other Nordic countries began to allow dual citizenship following the 1997 European Convention on Nationality, Denmark only followed suit following a 2014 amendment to the Citizenship Act, meaning that Danes are allowed to hold dual citizenship since 1 September 2015.

== History ==
=== 1776 law ===
The first Danish citizenship law was passed in 1776 (titled 'Indføds-Retten, according to which all public positions in his Majesty’s Kingdom are exclusively reserved for native-born subjects and those who are respected as equal to them') as an act of Indfødsret (or ius indigenatus), where public positions in the kingdoms were only accessible to native-born subjects or their equals. Prior to this, many foreigners, especially Germans, had reached high-level administrative-positions in the Danish Kingdom and therefore this law helped reduce the influence of foreigners in the Danish government. Legally, having 'native-born' status was essentially based on jus soli. Practically, however, "native-born" status was based on jus sanguinis, as only children born on Danish territory to Danish parents acquired indfødsret at birth. Children born on the territory of alien parents had to remain in the Danish kingdom in order to meet the acquisition criteria. Immigrants to the Danish Kingdom could only acquire an equal-status to native-born Danes if they were naturalized by the Danish monarch. When Denmark democratized in 1849, the Danish monarch lost their sole-right to grant naturalizations (known as indfødsret ([ius indigenatus]) on immigrants. Doing-so was now done through statute, as per the Danish constitution. During the same period, Indfødsret became more of a citizenship or nationality concept, this is because political rights became associated with this status. The 1776 law remained mostly unchanged except for who could grant naturalizations until it was replaced by the 1898 law, which was Denmark's first proper citizenship law.

=== 1898 law ===
The 1898 law, known as The Act on the Acquisition and Loss of Indfødsret, changed the basic acquisition of Danish nationality from ius soli to ius sanguinis principles. Indfødsret and citizenship were two different things at the time based on domicile, therefore the Danish government, wishing to simplify its nationality law, merged the two concepts by making the two terms equivalent in the written law by the 20th century. Since the late 1890s, Danish citizenship law had been based on Nordic cooperation, meaning the Nordic countries had very similar nationality laws.

=== 1925 law ===
In 1925, there was a reform of the citizenship law.

=== 1950 law ===
In 1950, another reform was made to the Danish citizenship law. Gender equality was introduced to the law. The current Danish nationality laws are based fundamentally on the 1950 law but there have been many amendments over the years, especially since the year 2000.

Denmark's constitution requires that aliens naturalizing to Danish nationality is done through statute, where each applicant's name is mentioned by the legislative power in acts granting citizenship.

In-contrast to neighbouring states, since 2000 Denmark has increased its barriers to naturalization rather than lessen them. This has been attributed to problems regarding globalization and immigration. The Danish nationality rules are stricter regarding general residence requirements, conduct requirements (ex. criminality), and language requirements. Meanwhile, residents of other Nordic countries have relaxed naturalization rules due to regional agreements, thus they can naturalize in Denmark after two years of residence.

Overview of the rules on automatic acquisition of Danish citizenship at birth or upon the parents' subsequent marriage
Birth period	Law	Provisions
1 January 1951 – 31 December 1978	Act No. 252 of 27 May 1950 on Danish citizenship; Consolidated Act No. 409 of 17 December 1968 on Danish citizenship	§ 1. Danish citizenship is acquired at birth if: 1. a married child whose father is Danish, 2. a child born in the Realm whose mother is Danish, if the father does not have citizenship of any country, or if the child does not acquire the citizenship of the father, 3. a child born out of wedlock whose mother is Danish. A foundling who is found here in the realm shall, until otherwise stated, be regarded as have Danish citizenship.; § 2. If a child of a Danish father and a foreign mother has not acquired Danish citizenship at birth, the child acquires Danish citizenship upon the parents' marriage. It is a prerequisite that the child at the time of the marriage is unmarried and under the age of 18.
1 January 1979 – 31 January 1999	Statutory Decree No. 155 of 6 April 1978 on Danish citizenship; Legislative Decree no. 457 of 17 June 1991 on Danish citizenship; Consolidated Act No. 757 of 14 September 1995 on Danish citizenship	§ 1. Danish citizenship is acquired at birth if: 1. a married child whose father or mother is Danish, 2. a child born out of wedlock whose mother is Danish.; Subsection 2. A foundling who is found here in the realm shall, until otherwise stated, be regarded as have Danish citizenship. § 2. If a child of a Danish father and a foreign mother has not acquired Danish citizenship at birth, the child acquires Danish citizenship upon the parents' marriage. It is a prerequisite that the child at the time of the marriage is unmarried and under the age of 18.
1 February 1999 – 30 June 2014	Consolidated Act No. 28 of 15 January 1999 on Danish citizenship; Consolidated Act No. 113 of 20 February 2003 on Danish citizenship; Legislative Decree no. 422 of 7 June 2004 on Danish citizenship	§ 1. A child acquires Danish citizenship at birth if the father or mother is Danish. If the child's parents are not married, and only the father is Danish, the child only acquires Danish citizenship if he or she is born in Denmark. Subsection 2. A foundling who is found here in the Realm shall, until otherwise stated, be deemed to have Danish citizenship. § 2. If a child of a Danish father and a foreign mother has not acquired Danish citizenship at birth, the child acquires Danish citizenship upon the parents' marriage. It is a prerequisite that the child at the time of the marriage is unmarried and under 18 years of age. From 1 July 2002: § 2 B. A marriage contracted by a person who is already married shall have no legal effects under this Act as long as both marriages subsist.
1 July 2014 – 31 January 2020	Legislative Decree no. 422 of 7 June 2004 on Danish citizenship as amended by, among others, Act No. 729 of 25 June 2014 on amendments to the Danish Citizenship Act (Acquisition of Danish citizenship at birth); Consolidated Act No. 1029 of 10 July 2018 on Danish citizenship	§ 1. A child acquires Danish citizenship at birth if the father, mother or co-mother is Danish. Subsection 2. A foundling who is found here in Kingdom shall, until otherwise stated, be regarded as having Danish citizenship.

== See also ==
- Immigration to Denmark
- Citizenship in the Danish West Indies
