= James Belcastro =

American mobster (1895–1945)

- Born: 1895
- Died: August 23, 1945 (aged 49–50); Elmhurst, Illinois, U.S.
- Other names: Mad Bomber, King of the Bombers
- Allegiance: Chicago Outfit

James "Mad Bomber" Belcastro (1895 – August 23, 1945) was a Black Hand gang member, extortionist, and later chief bomber for the Chicago Outfit during Prohibition.

== Biography ==
Known as "King of the Bombers", Belcastro was highly skilled at constructing improvised explosive devices. He used these skills to extort money from business owners in Chicago's Little Italy district during the 1910s. In the early 1920s, Johnny Torrio and Al Capone formed the Chicago Outfit and put the Black Hand gangs out of business. However, Capone invited Belcastro to join the Outfit and he soon became a prominent member. During the mid to late 1920s, Belcastro was suspected of causing over 100 deaths while bombing saloons that refused to buy alcohol from Capone.

During the 1927 Chicago primary elections – the so-called "Pineapple Primary" – Belcastro launched a bombing campaign against the opponents of Capone ally and mayor, William Hale Thompson. He primarily attacked voting stations in wards where opinion was thought to oppose Thompson, killing at least 15 people. Lawyer and activist Octavius Granady, an African American who dared to challenge Thompson's Black vote, was chased through the streets on polling day by cars of gunmen before being shot dead. Belcastro was arrested in October 1927 and charged with Granady's murder, his co-charged included four policemen; all charges were dropped after key witnesses recanted their statements. By the end of the 1920s, the Chicago Crime Commission had listed Belcastro on its famous "public enemies" list.

=== Later years ===
On January 11, 1931, Belcastro was shot five times in the head and body. An indication of the attitude of the police to Capone's organization was that they suggested the attack came because Belcastro was an independent operator. Later in 1931, Belcastro was considered a suspect in the murder of bootlegger Matt Kolb, but was never charged.

Throughout the 1930s and 1940s, Belcastro continued to rise in the Outfit and ultimately became one of its top enforcers. On August 23, 1945, James Belcastro died of heart disease (although other accounts mistakenly claim his date of death on October 13, 1933).

== In popular culture ==
Belcastro was portrayed by Peter Mamakos in the 1959 television movie The Scarface Mob as well as on The Untouchables TV series.
