= Virgin Islands Americans (stateside) =

Demographic group

Total population
- U.S. Virgin Islands origin: 15,014

Languages
- English, Virgin Islands Creole

Religion
- Predominantly Christianity

Related ethnic groups
- Caribbean

Virgin Islands Americans are a group of West Indian Americans born in the U.S. Virgin Islands or British Virgin Islands and those individuals with ancestry from either territory who live in the U.S. states.

The U.S. Virgin Islands are an unincorporated territory of the United States. Individuals born in the U.S. Virgin Islands on or after January 17, 1917 are U.S. citizens. As a result, U.S. Virgin Islanders do not go through the legal immigration procedures that most other West Indian immigrants would. However, the British Virgin Islands are a British Overseas Territory. As a result, British Virgin Islanders are required to go through legal immigration procedures when entering the United States.

== Demographics ==
Virgin Islands Americans include those with ancestry from both the U.S. Virgin Islands and British Virgin Islands. Many of them concentrate in areas with large West Indian communities, such as in New York, Florida, and Georgia.

=== Population by state ===
==== Relative to the population of each state ====
State/territory	2020 census: U.S. Virgin Islander	% (2020)	2020 census: British Virgin Islander	% (2020)
Alabama	76	0.09%	2	0.0%
Alaska	13	0.02%	n/a	n/a
Arizona	76	0.09%	0	0.0%
Arkansas	11	0.02%	n/a	n/a
California	323	0.38%	28	0.08%
Colorado	107	0.13%	3	0.0%
Connecticut	216	0.25%	10	0.03%
Delaware	46	0.06%	4	0.02%
District of Columbia	39	0.05%	1	0.0%
Florida	3,639	4.18%	155	0.42%
(Georgia (U.S. state)) Georgia	1,365	1.57%	49	0.14%
Hawaii	13	0.02%	0	0.0%
Idaho	2	0.0%	n/a	n/a
Illinois	94	0.11%	2	0.0%
Indiana	41	0.05%	3	0.0%
Iowa	15	0.02%	2	0.0%
Kansas	11	0.02%	0	0.0%
Kentucky	40	0.05%	3	0.0%
Louisiana	83	0.10%	0	0.0%
Maine	13	0.02%	0	0.0%
Maryland	455	0.53%	25	0.07%
Massachusetts	297	0.35%	40	0.11%
Michigan	79	0.10%	3	0.0%
Minnesota	39	0.05%	3	0.0%
Mississippi	8	0.0%	0	0.0%
Missouri	23	0.03%	4	0.0%
Montana	5	0.0%	0	0.0%
Nebraska	6	0.0%	n/a	n/a
Nevada	55	0.07%	n/a	n/a
New Hampshire	47	0.06%	n/a	n/a
New Jersey	403	0.47%	27	0.08%
New Mexico	13	0.02%	2	0.0%
New York	1,281	1.47%	135	0.37%
North Carolina	461	0.53%	13	0.04%
North Dakota	0	0.0%	1	0.0%
Ohio	93	0.11%	4	0.02%
Oklahoma	48	0.06%	n/a	n/a
Oregon	25	0.03%	2	0.0%
Pennsylvania	439	0.51%	12	0.04%
Puerto Rico	80	0.10%	14	0.04%
Rhode Island	44	0.06%	10	0.03%
South Carolina	86	0.10%	3	0.0%
South Dakota	4	0.0%	3	0.0%
Tennessee	69	0.08%	4	0.02%
Texas	913	1.05%	15	0.05%
Utah	7	0.0%	n/a	n/a
Vermont	8	0.0%	n/a	n/a
Virginia	391	0.45%	15	0.05%
Washington	115	0.14%	2	0.0%
West Virginia	6	0.0%	2	0.0%
Wisconsin	22	0.03%	5	0.02%
Wyoming	0	0.0%	0	0.0%
United States	11,745	13.48%	606	1.64%

=== New York ===
During the 1920s, a large influx of Virgin Islanders migrated to New York City in search of jobs and economic opportunities. In 1925, the population of native islanders in the city was 8,000 alone. However, while living in Harlem, Virgin Islanders encountered deeper racial tensions than what was felt on the islands. This led to the Harlem Renaissance, in which Casper Holstein, Hubert Harrison, Ashley Totten and Frank Crosswaith joined other Caribbean migrants to advocate for equal rights in their community. New York City is historically known to be the first stop city for Virgin Islanders, and remains so today. The 2020 census estimated that 1,281 Virgin Islanders resided in New York state.

=== Florida ===
According to the 2020 census, Florida has the highest population of Virgin Islanders in any state throughout the country. New York and Georgia rank second and third. Recent data have shown Orange County particularly Metro Orlando (248), Pine Hills (189), Oak Ridge (27), and Apopka (33) to be the most settled region for Virgin Islanders not only in Florida but the entire United States. Other regions with a large Virgin Islander population include Ft. Lauderdale and Jacksonville. Many high school students from the Virgin Islands have attended Bethune–Cookman University in Daytona Beach, and many carnival troupes take part in the Orlando Carnival activities each May.

== Notable people ==
=== Actors ===
- Wayne Brady (born 1972), actor; born in Georgia
- Lisa Canning (born 1966), television actress; born on St. Thomas
- Kelsey Grammer (born 1955), actor; born on St. Thomas
- Lawrence Hilton-Jacobs (born 1953), actor; born in New York City
- Hannah Jeter (born 1990), model and television host; born on St. Thomas
- Jasmin St. Claire (born 1972), adult film actress; born in Christiansted, St. Croix
- Joan Smalls (born 1988), model and television personality; father from St. Thomas
- Karrine Steffans (born 1978), New York Times bestselling author, former hip hop music video performer, actress; born on St. Thomas

=== Artists ===
- Fraser Kershaw, philanthropist, film artist

=== Athletes ===
- Raja Bell (born 1976), basketball player; born on St. Croix
- Tombi Bell (born 1979), basketball player, who last played for the Minnesota Lynx of the WNBA; born on St. Croix
- Aliyah Boston (born 2001), basketball player currently with the Indiana Fever of the WNBA; born on St. Thomas
- Joe Christopher (born 1935), the first Virgin Islander to play in Major League Baseball; born in Frederiksted, St. Croix
- Midre Cummings (born 1971), baseball player; born on St. Croix
- Tim Duncan (born 1976), Hall of Fame basketball player who spent his entire NBA career with the San Antonio Spurs; born in Christiansted, St. Croix
- Emile Griffith (1938–2013), boxer; born on St. Thomas
- Elrod Hendricks (1940–2005), Minor League Baseball player and coach; born in Charlotte Amalie, St. Thomas
- Julian Jackson (born 1960), boxer; born on St. Thomas
- Alex McFarlane (born 2001), Major League Baseball player; born on St. Thomas
- Calvin Pickering (born 1976), baseball player; born on St. Thomas
- J'Wan Roberts (born 2001), basketball player with Houston Cougars of the Big 12 Conference; born on St. Thomas
- Sugar Ray Seales (born 1952), 1972 Olympic gold medalist (139 lbs.) boxer; born on St. Croix
- Darnell Sweeney (born 1991), Major League Baseball player; father born in the British Virgin Islands

=== Musicians ===
- Alton Adams (1889–1987), musician, first black bandmaster in the United States Navy; born in Charlotte Amalie, St. Thomas
- Bennie Benjamin (1907–1989), composer, songwriter, philanthropist; born in Christiansted, St. Croix
- Jon Lucien, jazz musician; born on Tortola, raised on St. Thomas
- Rock City, a musical duo of composed brothers Timothy and Theron Thomas, born on St. Thomas
- Sonny Rollins, jazz musician; born in New York, of St. Thomas (mother) and St. Croix (father) descent
- Verse Simmonds, singer, rapper, and producer; born in Puerto Rico, raised on St. Thomas

=== Political leaders ===
- Judah P. Benjamin (1811–1884), Secretary of the Treasury, Confederate States of America; born in Christiansted, St. Croix
- Frank Rudolph Crosswaith (1892–1965), socialist and labor leader; born in Frederiksted, St. Croix
- Donna Christensen (born 1945), former US House delegate for the U.S. Virgin Islands; born in New Jersey
- Octavius C. Granady (1885-1928), lawyer, civil rights activist, and politician; born in Christiansted, St. Croix
- Alexander Hamilton (1755–1804), first United States Secretary of the Treasury, an American "Founding Father", economist, and political philosopher; born in Nevis, raised on St. Croix
- Hubert Henry Harrison (1883–1927), orator, political activist; born in St. Croix
- Elizabeth Anna Hendrickson (1884–1946), civil rights leader; born in St. Croix
- Casper Holstein (born 1888), humanitarian; born in St. Croix
- Roy Innis (born 1934), African-American activist, civil rights leader; born in St. Croix
- Kenneth Mapp (born 1955), former governor, lieutenant governor and senator of the U.S. Virgin Islands; born in New York City
- J. Raymond Jones (1899–1991), political leader, humanitarian; born in St. Thomas
- John de Jongh (born 1957), past governor of the U.S. Virgin Islands, former financial executive; born in St. Thomas
- Neville James, former senator of the U.S. Virgin Islands from St. Croix; born in New York City
- William Leidesdorff (1810–1848), entrepreneur; born in St. Croix
- Ruby Margaret Rouss (1921–1988) first black woman to be elected to preside over a state legislature; born in St. Croix
- Stacey Plaskett (born 1966), current US House delegate for the U.S. Virgin Islands; born in New York City
- Usie Richards (born 1956), former senator of the U.S. Virgin Islands from St. Croix; born in New York City
- Terence Todman (born 1926), ambassador; born in the U.S. Virgin Islands
- Denmark Vesey (1767–1822), slave revolt leader; born on St. Thomas
- David Levy Yulee (1810–1886), U.S. Senator; born on St. Thomas

=== Writers and intellectuals ===
- Barbara Christian (1943–2000), educator, feminist critic; born on St. Thomas
- Cadwell Turnbull (born 1987), writer; grew up in St. Thomas, parents from St. Thomas
- Tiphanie Yanique (born 1978), fiction writer, poet, essayist; born on St. Thomas

=== News media personalities ===
- Candace Owens (born 1989), conservative news commentator, Turning Point USA co-founder, YouTube personality; grandmother from St. Thomas

== See also ==
- West Indian Americans
- Stateside Puerto Ricans
