= Octavius C. Granady =

20th century Virgin Islands and Chicago politician

Octavius Cato Granady
- Born: March 1, 1885; Christiansted, St. Croix, U.S. Virgin Islands
- Died: April 10, 1928 (aged 43); Chicago, Illinois, US
- Resting place: Lincoln Cemetery (Cook County)
- Education: Saint Lawrence University Howard University
- Political party: Republican

Octavius C. Granady (March 1, 1885 - April 10, 1928) was an African American lawyer and politician, World War I veteran, and Afro-Caribbean civil rights activist for the Virgin Islands. After years of advocating for fair treatment of Virgin Islanders, he moved to the United States, where he stood as a reform candidate for committeeman in the "Bloody" Twentieth Ward of Chicago in 1928. The car chase and machine gun assassination of Granady by gangster Al Capone's men, on the day of the infamous so-called "Pineapple Primary", made national headlines. Public disapproval of the violence was followed by crushing political losses for the opposing slate supported by Capone's ally Chicago Mayor William Hale ("Big Bill") Thompson.

== Life ==
=== Early years ===
Granady was born in Saint Thomas in the U.S. Virgin Islands, to Alexander O. Granady and his wife Eliza, of Afro-Caribbean descent. He had two living sisters, Mrs. Mary E. Johnson and Julia Johnson, as well as a brother, Robert Fraser, who died in infancy. He moved to the United States at the age of 5, attended college at The Saint Lawrence University in Canton, NY, graduating in 1907 as a bachelor of laws, then graduated from Howard University School of Law in the class of 1912. During his time in New York, he also was an officer and founding member of the Roosevelt League of the Eighth Assembly District in Brooklyn, as well as several other associations such as the Cherubin Lodge and the West Indian Forum.

He passed the Chicago Bar in 1916 and returned to the Virgin Islands to practice law. He was appointed by President Woodrow Wilson to pull down the Danish flag and raise the American flag in the Virgin Islands after their cession to the U.S. During this time he organized the first class in American History taught on St. Thomas.

He served in World War I as a first lieutenant and was discharged with the rank of captain.

=== Activism ===
Granady was active in the struggle towards self-rule and civil rights in the Virgin Islands, despite persecution from the American military government.

After signing of the Treaty of the Danish West Indies, in 1917 the United States completed their purchase of the Virgin Islands from Denmark. They placed the islands under the rule of a military governor, Admiral James Harrison Oliver. Although the transition was welcomed by residents at first, discontent grew as sailors and marines from the new naval base often disrupted the peace or treated the residents with disrespect. Also, initially the residents of the islands were not given citizenship and had no access to self rule. Furthermore, the 93-95% of the population who were descended from Caribs, Arawaks, and Africans, were used to being treated with more equality by the Danes than they received from the Americans.

In January 1919, after a series of incidents involving naval personnel, an open letter, "Virgin Islanders Resent Lawlessness" was sent to Government House, newspapers in the Virgin Islands, Puerto Rico, and the United States. This open letter protested "an outrage on our defenceless people hitherto unknown on this island" perpetrated by U.S. sailors and marines in the Virgin Islands. Granady, along with notable Virgin Islands activists Rothschild Francis, Charles A. Emanuel, and Randolph A. Innin, were the four signatories.

According to the angry and embarrassed Governor Oliver, in a confidential letter to the Secretary of the Navy, Granady was the most likely author of the open letter. Governor Oliver suspected a previously sent anonymous letter as having been written by a "Miss A. C. Burnet" (Note: Perhaps notable attorney and educator Aminta Clarita Burnet) who was Granady's clerk. According to Oliver, Miss Burnet had given birth to Granady's child in July 1918 before leaving the island, and thus could not testify that the anonymous letter was actually penned by Granady (a self contradiction on the part of Oliver).

In the same letter, Oliver complained that Granady was using his "considerable and bad influence with the lower classes" to incite racial strife where none had existed before, and described him as "demented". From December 1917 to at least 1919, Grenady's license to practice law in the Virgin Islands was cancelled by the government on claims of fraud and "exorbitant fees for his legal advice", and he was jailed in January 1918 for same. After being freed for lack of evidence, he was denied the return of his license because of the Governor's claims that Granady was clinically insane.

In 1921, he moved to St. Croix and regained his law license, and became counsel for the St. Croix Labor Union, where he assisted Ralph de Chabert in the organization of a labor strike. Sugar planters had cut worker wages by half due to an economic downturn, and Chabert called a strike demanding $1.25 a day in wages. After 14 weeks, workers were reduced to near starvation conditions and the strike disastrously failed, to the disgust of Marcus Garvey, who took D. Hamilton Jackson's side in the animosity between the once-friends Jackson and Chabert. Granady left St. Croix after the collapse of the strike.

In March 1923, Granady was convicted of criminal trespassing and was denied the opportunity to use the testimony of a material witness in his defence and lost his license again in January 1924 when the district court of the Virgin Islands revoked the 1921 renewal. However, during a mass demonstration in April 1924, he was elected to travel to Washington, D.C. in support of Bill S2786, sponsored by Senator George McLean, requesting citizenship for the Virgin Islanders and a civil government for the US Virgin Islands in lieu of the Navy rule.

In May 1924, Granady represented St. Thomas, along with Ralph J. Bough (St. Croix), and Frederick Gurty (St. John) in a delegation to the United States Congress. He explained,

The local press and a number of mass meetings virtually repudiated the Colonial Council for its recent opposition to Senate Bill 2786 granting the islands a civil government. The people of the islands are not citizens of any country; and they are not represented in the legislature. The franchise is so limited that out of 22,000 inhabitants only 800 have the right to vote, which is granted on the basis of property and income.

The bill did not pass. However, in 1927, the Act Conferring United States Citizenship on the Virgin Islands passed, conferring U.S. citizenship on Virgin Islanders, and a limited and conditional set of U.S. voting rights and privileges on citizens resident to the islands. A civil government was not granted to the Virgin Islands until 1931.

Granady returned to Chicago in 1925 and joined the Chicago Bar Association.

== Death ==
In 1928, the Republicans of Chicago were split into two camps: that of infamously corrupt Mayor Thompson, and that of incumbent U.S. Senator Charles S. Deneen, with the positions of U.S. Senator, Governor, and State Attorney for Cook County at stake. Despite the dangers of opposing the powerful Mayor's machine, Granady joined the slate of Sen. Deneen as a reform candidate, for councilman of Chicago's Twentieth Ward, a largely African American ward. The incumbent candidate on the ballot was Thompson's supporter, Morris Eller, an "America First" leader who was associated with both North Side and South Side gangs of Chicago.

As soft-on-speakeasies Thompson was openly supported by infamous Chicago gangster Al Capone, the months before the primary were punctuated with violence, including the frequent use of hand grenades ("pineapples") to bomb the homes and localities of Deneen and supporters, and the drive-by murder of Diamond Joe Esposito.

April 10, 1928 was Primary Day, later known in history as the "Pineapple Primary". Widespread voter intimidation, ballot box stuffing, and other election fraud necessitated watchers at the polls. Eller's men roved the 20th Ward, beating and kidnapping Granady voters and poll watchers. In the morning, Granady requested additional safety measures for his supporters and Senator Deneen also pleaded for police protection, but the Chicago police denied them help. To rally the frightened voters, Granady embarked on an official tour of the ward in a car decorated with flags supporting the Deneenite slate, in the company of friends, including law student Euclid Taylor (the driver), Thomas Clark, and James Huff. However, as they approached a polling location near 13th St and Blue Island Ave, they saw a small crowd of men and decided to turn around. A man stepped forward and shot at Granady's car with pistols. Granady and his friends fled in their car, but were pursued through the Chicago streets by gunmen in a sedan festooned with banners supporting Eller.

Witnesses reported that the pursuing car was joined by a squad car, alternating in their pursuit of Granady's car. After being grazed by a bullet, Taylor lost control and they hit a curb and a tree at 13th St. and Hoyne Ave. Granady's car was disabled. The assassins used a machine gun to kill Granady and then sped off, leaving Taylor with three minor wounds and the other two passengers almost unhurt. Later it was found that Granady had been shot 30 times.

Eller went on to win the 20th Ward primary on the day that Granady was killed, 7,437 to 157.

=== Investigation ===
The identity of the assassins and their sponsors was an open secret; there were scores or even hundreds of witnesses to the car chase and murder, and the killers' vehicle was prominently identified with the Eller campaign. Newspapers breathlessly reported, "Draped with bunting and other election decorations, they bore large banners urging people to reelect Morris Eller as 20th Ward committeeman. The last thing some witnesses to the murder saw was Eller’s own face prominently pictured on the backs of the receding cars.” Furthermore, "Police revealed this morning that two volunteer poll guards, who were kidnaped [sic] Tuesday, had identified the house where they were kept prisoners and had given information which established that the kidnaping gangsters were the same who killed Granady."

Less certain was whether a second car of killers had been involved, but multiple witnesses indicated that a second car had pursued Granady's car, and that policemen were identified among the killers.

With the assassination grabbing front page headlines nationwide, local business leaders were frustrated by the inaction of the Thompson-appointed police commissioner, and anxious to clean up Chicago in time for the World's Fair. The state of Illinois called in a chief special prosecutor, legendary Chicago attorney Frank J. Loesch, vice president of the Chicago Crime Commission. Loesch, then 76 years old, brought in John Stege, the chief of detectives of Chicago, and Sheridan Alexander Bruseaux, a well-known African American private detective, to assist.

The resulting investigation eventually implicated men who were in the pay of both Morris Eller, the opposing candidate, and the backer of his slate, Al Capone. Moreover, the investigators uncovered widespread election fraud, election interference, corruption, and violence perpetrated by the faction of Chicago Mayor William Hale ("Big Bill") Thompson with the assistance of Capone.

The following arrests were made:

1. John Armondo, assistant precinct captain for the 20th, also charged with attempting to kidnap and shooting George W. Dowthard, an African-American poll worker, who survived after six weeks in hospital and identified Armondo. Armondo was arrested and indicted July 2, 1928 He was also identified by Clark and Huff as the man standing on the running board of the car and firing at them.
2. Harry Hochstein, one of the three indicted for the murder along with Armondo and Belcastro
3. James Belcastro (prosecution failed for the Granady murder, but Belcastro was later arrested as part of a bombing syndicate)
4. Louis Clementi (identified by Loesch as the man who fired the final shots that killed Grenady)
5. Thomas Somnerio (driver of the pursuing car)
6. Lt. Phillip J. Carroll (identified by over 14 witnesses)
7. Patrolman Michael B. Shannon
8. Walter F. Bailey
9. Geo. Tapling
10. Michael Loughney
11. Sammy Kaplan

Other arrests included Joseph "Peppi" Genaro, Johnny "Rocky" Fanelli, and August Lastity, who were also charged with kidnappings of poll watchers on the west side.

However, Morris Eller's son Emanuel Eller, a Cook County judge of the Superior court and acting chief justice of the criminal court, enabled the release of at least three suspects by lowering the bonds for Kaplan and Hochstein, and accepting Armondo's surety that had been rejected by the bond department for the special grand jury.

Eventually, Loesch's team was able to indict Morris Eller, his son Judge Emanuel Eller, and 15 henchmen with 23 counts of general conspiracy, as follows:

- Counts 1-7 were charges of malicious assaults on 7 victims including poll watchers and attorneys
- Count 8 was a charge of conspiracy to murder Grenady with revolvers and deadly weapons
- Counts 9-15 were charges of kidnapping of the 7 people above
- Count 16 was a general count covering the assault of election day watchers and challengers to prevent them from performing their duties
- Count 17 grouped all the assaults into a single count
- Count 18 grouped all the kidnappings
- Count 19 was a charge with intimidation of poll watchers
- Count 20 was a charge of aiding and abetting 8 men in voting multiple times illegally
- Count 21 was a charge of defrauding taxpayers by padding the Sanitary district payrolls
- Count 22 was a charge of defrauding the city by paying people for services that were not rendered, in return for election help
- Count 23 charged the conspirators with protecting vice dens such as houses of prostitution, alcohol, and gambling, in return for election help

Named as co-conspirators were: Joseph Silverman, Martin Klass (an Eller kinsman), Julius Breecher, Meyer Mackenberg, Albert Goldberg, Jesse Barnett, Joseph Schneiderman, Willie Scott, Willie Brown, Henry Watts, John Freeman, Policeman George Hartigan, Joseph T. Krison, Policeman Marshall D. Couch, and Benny Zion, alias Yanger. Zion had been murdered the week before the indictment.

Bruseaux was able to find 125 witnesses to testify before the grand jury, for which he was highly praised by Loesch.

The charges against the two Ellers were eventually dropped. When Loesch insisted on continuing the case against police Lt. Carroll against the advice of Deputy Commissioner Stege and detective Bruseaux, State Attorney Swanson pulled out of Loesch's election inquiry and cut off staff and resources.

=== Witness intimidation and murders ===
Misfortunes tended to happen to potential witnesses for the prosecution.

June 21, 1928: James Huff, a passenger in Granady's car during the murder and star witness for the grand jury against Armondo, was subject to a kidnapping attempt before being rescued by his wife, Bruseaux, and the police.

July 31, 1928: Benny Zion, an Eller man who rode in the killers' car and described by Stege as having a "gabby tongue" was found under a pile of refuse. He had been shot to death a few hours before Morris Eller was due to appear before the special grand jury.

October 17, 1928: Caesar Jones was attacked while passing an alley

October, 1928: William Sephus, a barber shop owner and an important witness for the prosecution, was "slugged" and another witness was put on a bus to St. Louis and told to flee. Mrs. Sallie Cannon, another witness, received a threatening letter and had a brick thrown through her window.

November 1, 1928: Margaret Welch, a witness against Armondo and Belcastro, was threatened with death and her younger brother kidnapped.

October 20, 1929: Shelby McDougal, a key witness against Lt. Carroll, was murdered by a love rival.

=== Trials ===
==== 1928 Trial ====
Some details of the plot to assassinate Granady were revealed during a first trial in October 1928 of 16 defendants for conspiracy to commit various acts of violence in connection with the primary election, under Judge John M. O'Connor. Witness William Cephus reported being told by Eller, "Winning this election is going to be a big job and we've got to win.You will have the police with you and a judge so you won't be bothered. If any of you boys don't have guns you can get them at Emanuel's house" (referring to his son Emanuel Eller). Cephus also testified that he overheard Reed and Klass in his barbershop saying that they "hated to kill Granady" the day after the murder.

The prosecutor also quoted Eller's speech to his ward workers the following morning, "Don't let anything stop you from winning this election and use guns if necessary"... "you can get guns at Johnny Armondo's house if you want them." Premeditation was also indicated by a witness who was told by a precinct captain, "You fellows must be crazy. Why don't you drop this Deneen stuff? Your friend, Granady, won't be here after 5 o'clock, and if you're wise, you won't come around after 4. "

Several witnesses for the defense testified that the defendants had been elsewhere during the crimes. Rev. Joseph C. McMillan also testified that the shooter he had seen was tall and then, not short like Armondo, and Bruseaux had threatened and tried to bribe him to give false testimony.

On November 23, 1928, fifteen of the sixteen defendants were found guilty and assessed fines, although none received jail time.

==== 1929 Trial ====
On October 11, 1929, Loesch was able to persuade a special grand jury to bring up charges against police Lieutenant Carroll, four of his officers, and four alleged gangsters, John Armando, Louis Clemente, Thomas Somnario, and James Belcastro, for Granady's murder. The trial began on November 18, 1929. Over the 8 days of the trial, Loesch struggled with a hostile Judge Joseph B. David, and saw his case crumble as witness after witness changed their stories.

The defense of Lt. Carroll rested on the testimony of the coroners that a shotgun was used to kill in Granady, not a police revolver. Loesch stated that it did not matter as all were chasing Granady's car and shooting at it. "In Illinois they are all accessories and all guilty of murder." Euclid Taylor, Granady's friend and the driver of the car, testified that Armondo had shot at them from 13th and Blue Island, before jumping on the running board of a squad car and continuing to fire.

On the second day of the trial, witness Joseph McMillan was somehow again called by the prosecution, and again refused to identify Armondo as the man who shot at Granady. He again accused Bruseaux of attempting to bribe him to identify Armondo, Hochstein, or Kaplan. Judge David accused State Attorney Swanson of wiretapping the room.

Bryant McDonald, a third witness, also changed his story and swore that he had seen a little man walk into the street, shoot at the car, and then get arrested by an uniformed police officer and three plain clothes detectives; but he said that none of these men were present in the courtroom; while another witness picked out Lt. Carroll with uncertainty. Yet another version of the story emerged when Julius Mayo, a state's witness, mistook one of the defense attorneys for Lt. Carroll: a cause for hilarity in the courtroom. Another witness declared that Carroll had been riding the squad car that pursued Granady, but his reliability was questioned on the grounds that the state attorney's office had bribed him to testify by finding him a job as a washroom attendant.

A police sergeant, Marshall Couch, testified that he had seen Armondo firing from the running board and that he had actually arrested another, tall, armed man, but released him upon being told by three men with badges that the shooter was a detective.

The star witness, Margaret Welch, fell to her knees, crying that she had been about to commit perjury. Defense claimed that she had been bribed with $1500 to testify; Loesch was forced to nolle prosequi his case against Belcastro and Armondo. Witness Helen Madigan became confused on the stand, and then the defense produced two witnesses, one of whom testified that Carroll and his squad did not arrive until ten minutes after the killing.

Yelling matches between Loesch and Judge Joseph B. David followed on November 26. Judge David recommended that the state enter a nolle prosse.

On November 27, Loesch made a motion to dismiss, stating that Judge David had been abusive to witnesses and counsel, and had repeatedly said he would set aside a verdict of guilty if it were returned. Judge David dismissed all charges.

None of the murder suspects received jail time.

== Public reaction and legacy ==
Despite Loesch's losses in court, most of the major candidates backed by Thompson lost the primary by a landslide. Voters appeared to be sickened by the violence and chaos, and reminded of the perpetrators by daily headlines about the murder and election conspiracy. Civic leaders and residents of Chicago contributed widely to private funds raised to further the investigations. Ultimately, none of Thompson's slate won in November 1928.

Granady's funeral at the Gaines African Methodist Episcopal church was attended by thousands of mourners, including notable politicians such as Sen. Deneen, who eulogized him fulsomely. Judge Lucius J. M. Malmin of the Virgin Islands, Daniel P. Trude and Charles W. Swanson also attended. Granady's sister, Mrs. Mary Johnson of New York, traveled to attend the service.

The pallbearers were members of the UNIA, for which he had been a counsel. He was buried in Chicago's Lincoln Cemetery in an unmarked grave.

The murder of Granady sparked a backlash among voters and business leaders to gangster violence and corruption in Chicago government, leading to the conviction of 17 Eller henchmen of ballot box stuffing. Eller and Thompson also gradually lost relevance and influence from this time onward. The Chicago general elections of November 1928 are generally agreed to have been free of corruption and election interference, as Capone took a step back from politics. Furthermore, energized by their success in breaking Eller and Thompson's hold, civic leaders raised money to fund investigators who allied with the federal Department of the Treasury, leading to Al Capone's eventual downfall.

Although not all of his initiatives succeeded in his lifetime, Granady's work towards for a civil government in the Virgin Islands, and higher wages for union workers in St. Croix were eventually fulfilled after his death. Granady's most lasting accomplishment was his advocacy for United States citizenship for Virgin Islanders, which was granted less than three years after his delegation visited Congress.

In 2010, the Fifth constitutional convention of the Virgin Islands included Granady in a list of native leaders who were persecuted by the military government, and he is mentioned in the historical section of the Proposed Virgin Islands Constitution.
