= Danish passport =

Danish passport; dansk pas
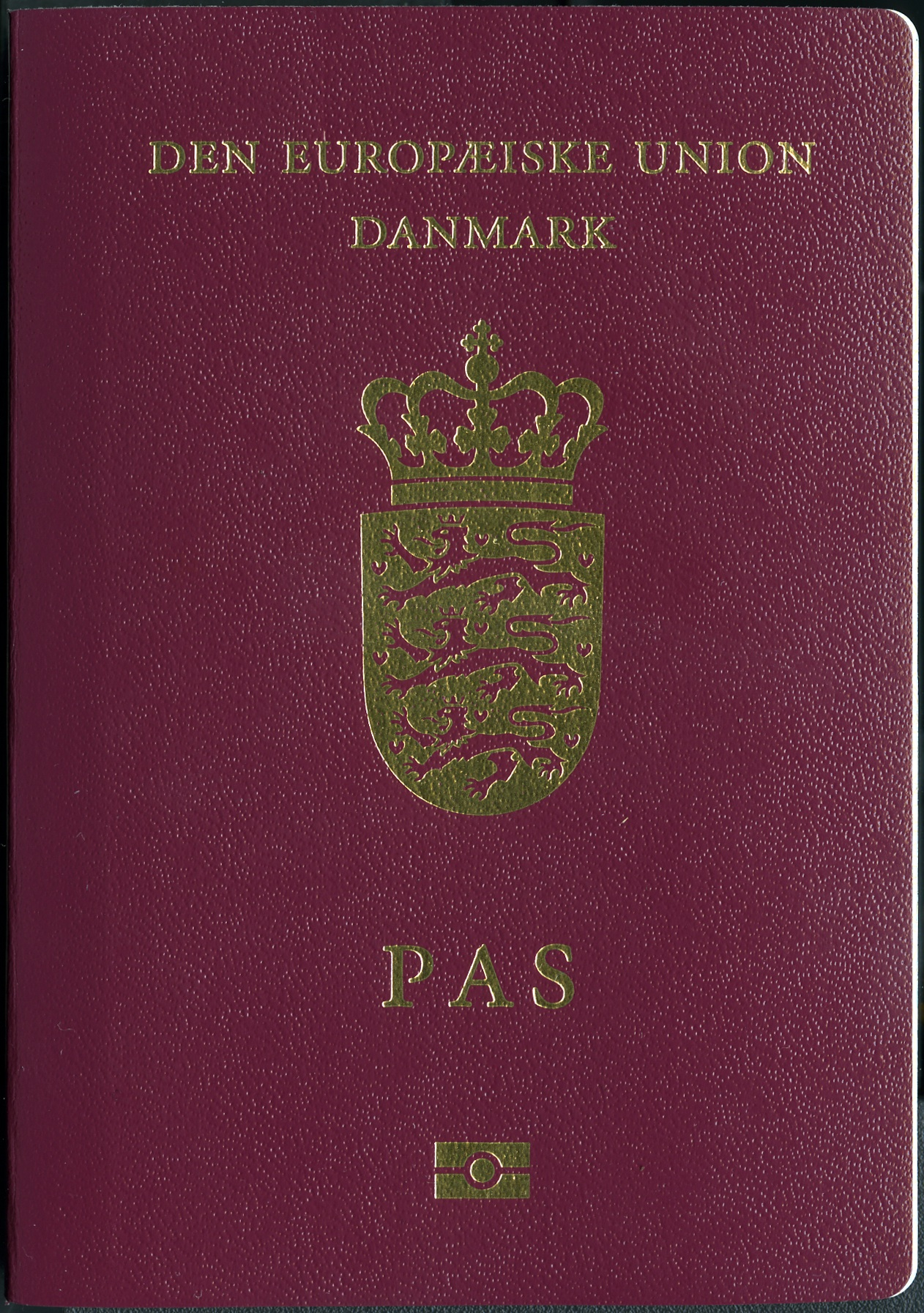
- The front cover of a contemporary Danish biometric passport
- Type: Passport
- Issued by: Local Governments in Denmark
- First issued: 1 January 1985 (first EU format); 1 August 2006 (biometric passport); 1 January 2012 (version 5); 1 October 2021 (current version)
- Purpose: Identification
- Eligibility: Citizens of the Kingdom of Denmark
- Expiration: 2 years and 4 months for children up to the age of 1; 5 years and 4 months for citizens aged 2–17; 10 years and 4 months for individuals above the age of 18 (All passports can be renewed for 1 year within 2 years of original expiration date)
- Cost: DKK 894 (age 18-64); DKK 382 (age 65+); DKK 182 (age 12-17); DKK 150 (age 0-11)

A Danish passport (Danish: dansk pas) is an identity document issued to citizens of the Kingdom of Denmark to facilitate international travel. Besides serving as proof of Danish citizenship, they facilitate the process of securing assistance from Danish consular officials abroad (or other EU consulates or Nordic missions in case a Danish consular official is absent).

Different versions exist for nationals of Denmark, Greenland, and the Faroe Islands although they do not indicate a different nationality, with all holders being Danish citizens. Danish nationals residing in Greenland can choose between the Danish—EU passport, and the sub-national Danish—Greenlandic passport.

Every Danish citizen (except for nationals residing in the Faroe Islands) is also a citizen of the European Union. The passport entitles its bearer to freedom of movement in the European Economic Area and Switzerland. For travel within the Nordic countries no identity documentation is legally required for Nordic citizens due to the Nordic Passport Union.

According to the July 2024 Visa Restrictions Index, Danish citizens can visit 192 countries without a visa or with a visa granted on arrival.

== Physical appearance ==
The Danish and Greenlandic versions of the passport have burgundy colour covers, according to the European Union's recommendations, while the Faroese-Danish version is green. All contain the National Coat of arms of Denmark emblazoned in the centre of the front cover, with the word DANMARK (Denmark) above it, and the word PAS (Passport) below. Since 1 August 2006, biometric passports are issued. Above the word DANMARK, the Danish version contains the words DEN EUROPÆISKE UNION (European Union) (as all other EU passports), while in the Greenlandic and Faroese versions the text KALAALLIT NUNAAT (Greenland) or FØROYAR (Faroe Islands) is written. Fields on the bearer's page are in Danish, English, and French, with translations in the official languages of the European Union elsewhere in the document. Instead of French, Faroese or Greenlandic are used in the Faroese and Greenlandic versions respectively. The page contains the following information:

- Photo of the passport holder
- Type (P)
- Passport No.
- Surname
- Given names
- Sex
- Nationality (Danish: Dansk, Danish, French: Danoise)
  - In a Faroe passport the following: Dansk/Danskur/Danish-Færøsk/Føroyskur/Faroese
  - In the Greenlandic passport the first page is in Greenlandic, Danish, and English, and the text on pages 1 and 2 are not in so many different languages, as in the Danish
- Height
- Date of Birth
- Personal Code Number
- Place of Birth
- Date of issue/expiry (validity is 10 years from date of issue for adults and 5 years for children)
- Authority (usually the municipality in which the holder resides)
- Holder's signature

Passports contain a machine readable strip starting with P>DNK for all types.

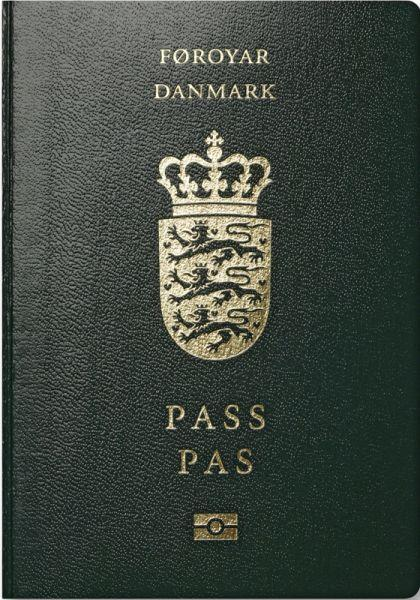
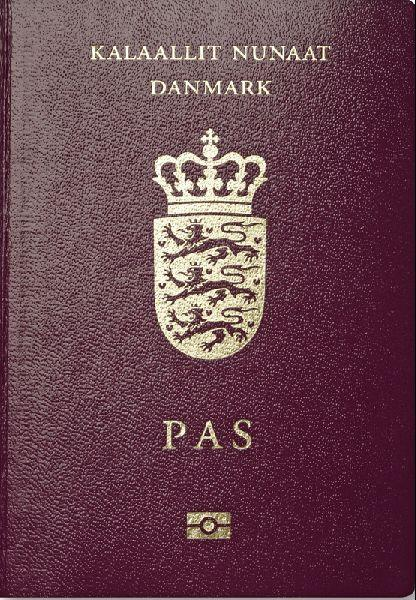
The front cover of a contemporary biometric Danish diplomatic passport, biometric Danish—Faroese passport, and biometric Danish—Greenlandic passport.

== Different spellings of the same name ==
Names containing letters not used in English (æ, ø, å) are spelled the correct way in the non-machine-readable zone, but are mapped in the machine-readable zone, æ becoming AE, ø becoming OE, and å becoming AA. This follows the international machine-readable passport standard.
For example, Gråbøl → GRAABOEL.

== Types ==
Besides the ordinary passport (with PAS on the cover), also 3 versions of blue service passports (TJENESTEPAS) and a single red diplomatic passport (DIPLOMATPAS) are issued. The latter does not bear the text DEN EUROPÆISKE UNION, KALAALLIT NUNAAT nor FØROYAR.

== Visa requirements ==
Countries and territories with visa-free entries or visas on arrival for holders of regular Danish passports Kingdom of Denmark Freedom of movement Visa not required / ESTA / eTA / eVisitor Visa on arrival eVisa Visa available both on arrival or online Visa required prior to arrival

As of 16 July 2024, Danish citizens had visa-free or visa on arrival access to 192 countries and territories, thus ranking the Danish passport fourth in the world (tied with the passports of Belgium and the United Kingdom) according to the Henley Passport Index. According to the World Tourism Organization 2016 report, the Danish passport is first in the world (tied with Finland, Germany, Italy, Luxembourg, Singapore, and the United Kingdom) in terms of travel freedom, with the mobility index of 160 (out of 215 with no visa weighted by 1, visa on arrival weighted by 0.7, eVisa by 0.5 and traditional visa weighted by 0).

As a member state of the European Union, Danish citizens enjoy freedom of movement within the European Economic Area (EEA). The Citizens’ Rights Directive defines the right of free movement for citizens of the EEA. Through bilateral agreements freedom of movement is extended to Switzerland, and all EU and EFTA nationals are not only visa-exempt but are legally entitled to enter and reside in each other's countries.

== Controversy ==
In 2010, an atheist Danish citizen filed a complaint to the Danish Ministry of Justice, due to the passport's inclusion of a picture of the crucifixion of Jesus as shown on the Jelling Stones, arguing that passports should be free of religious symbols. This argument was rejected by leading Danish politicians, arguing that Christianity is a part of Denmark's cultural history, and Christianity was not depicted exclusively, since the passport also includes an image of a dragon motif, likewise taken from the largest Jelling Stone. The passport design including images from the Jelling Stones was introduced in 1997, when the current burgundy design was introduced. Prior to Denmark's adoption of the common EU passport design and format (along with Italy and Ireland) in 1985, Danish passports had green or beige covers.

== Lack of national identity card ==
EU rules allow any citizen of a member country to travel anywhere in the EU without a passport, if they have a national identity card stating citizenship and some other standardised information. Denmark and Ireland are the only EU countries that do not issue national identity cards; however, Ireland issues passport cards which are treated by law as ID cards by some EU countries. Therefore, Denmark is the only country in the EU whose citizens cannot travel to other nations with ID cards or equivalents. There has been some political support for introducing such cards since the EU rule was introduced, but this has not yet become a reality.

== See also ==
- Visa requirements for Danish citizens
- Passports of the European Union
- Danish nationality law
- Visa policy of the Schengen Area
- Identity document#Denmark
