= United States Virgin Islander citizenship and nationality =

The United States Virgin Islands are a group of around 90 islands, islets, and cays in the Caribbean region in which inhabitants were claimed by Spain in 1493. No permanent settlements occurred in the Spanish period and the islands were colonized by Denmark in 1671. The inhabitants remained Danish nationals until 1917. From that date, islanders have derived their nationality from the United States. Nationality is the legal means in which inhabitants acquire formal membership in a nation without regard to its governance type. In addition to being United States' nationals, Virgin Islanders are both citizens of the United States and [local] citizens of the Virgin Islands.

== History of nationality in the Virgin Islands ==
=== Background and Danish period (1493–1917) ===
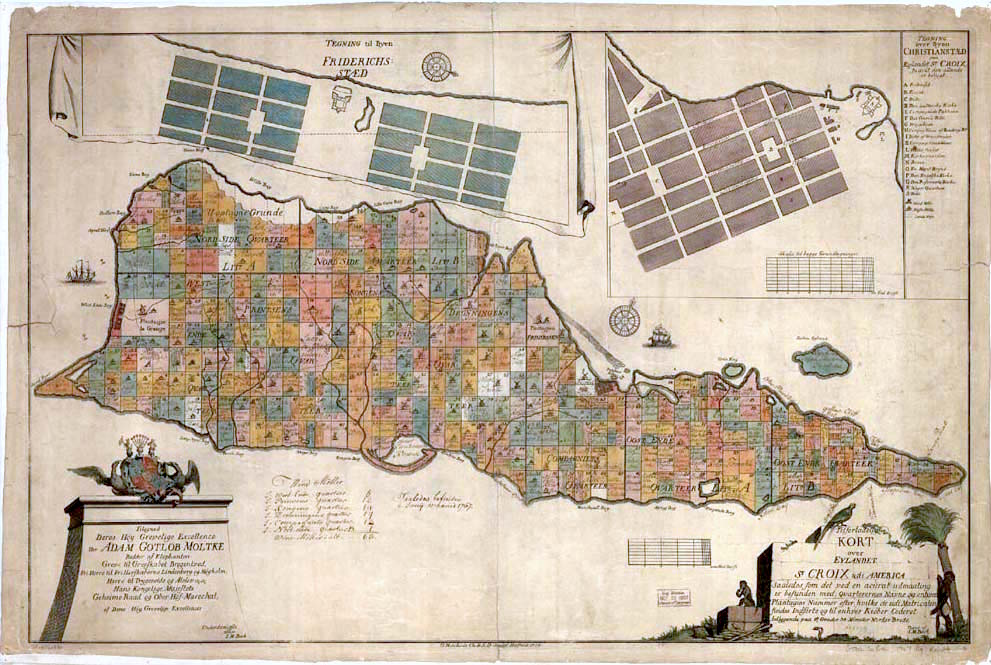
Danish map of St. Croix in 1754

Spain began exploration and mining activities in the Virgin Islands in 1493, but failed to establish permanent settlements in the area. In 1555, Charles V of Spain ordered the extermination of the native inhabitants. Having found no precious metals, Spain abandoned the islands, which became a pirate base and smuggling center for other Europeans. From 1625, Danish merchants began to take advantage of trade concessions made by the Spanish to allow European nations to do business in the West Indies. In 1670, the Danish West India Company was chartered by Christian V to establish a colony in St. Thomas and any other uninhabited island in the region. The company colonized St. Thomas in 1671, St. John in 1717, and purchased St. Croix from France in 1733. The lack of a native population at the time of colonization led to the introduction of slavery to the Danish West Indies. Instruments of Government, allowed the Danish West India Company to administer the colonies. Their governance evolved into a typical plantation society. Each planter was responsible for the maintenance and obligations of his children, slaves, and wife. There was no single code concerning the status of slaves; rather the administration passed various types of legislation as needed for local conditions. In theory, Danish laws as promulgated by the king were in force, but the company was given wide latitude in administering the colonies. Its charter said that neither Danish subjects nor foreigners could receive passports or permission to trade in the West Indies from any source other than the company.

Nationality was varied in the colonies, as settlement was based upon commercial ventures. The success of trade, being able to pay dividends and attract investors, was the primary focus of the company and there was little regard for civil or moral concerns. Official business in the colonies was conducted in English and the local population spoke Negerhollands, a creole language which was an amalgamation of African, Danish, Dutch, English, and Papiamento, with Portuguese and Spanish influences. In 1754, the crown took over the administration of the colonies and holdings of the company, establishing a special Accounts Registry Office (Danish: Renteskriverkontor) within the Treasury Department (da:Rentekammeret) for colonial affairs. In 1775, a law was passed granting freedmen equal civil rights in the islands, but it was not enforced, as Afro-Caribbean freedmen wrote to the king to complain of unequal conditions in the Danish West Indies in 1816. Governance on St. Thomas and St. John was jointly overseen by a General Council and by a separate council on St. Croix. The authority of the Governor-General was dependent upon the Danish crown and government, but members of the Burgher Councils had the authority to make proposals to him for improving the governance in the colonies. In 1760, the Accounts Registry Office was replaced by the West Indian and Guinea General Finance and Customs Office (da:Generaltoldkammeret). In the late 18th century, free people of color made up 55% of the population and a special law was passed in 1776 allowed freedmen residing in the Danish West Indies to obtain documents (Danish: fribreve) confirming their free status and granting them rights as citizens. Free Afro-Caribbean persons could not operate some types of businesses, particularly pubs or cotton plantations, were required to wear special clothing, and faced restrictions on their residence. They could however participate in civic life and duties.

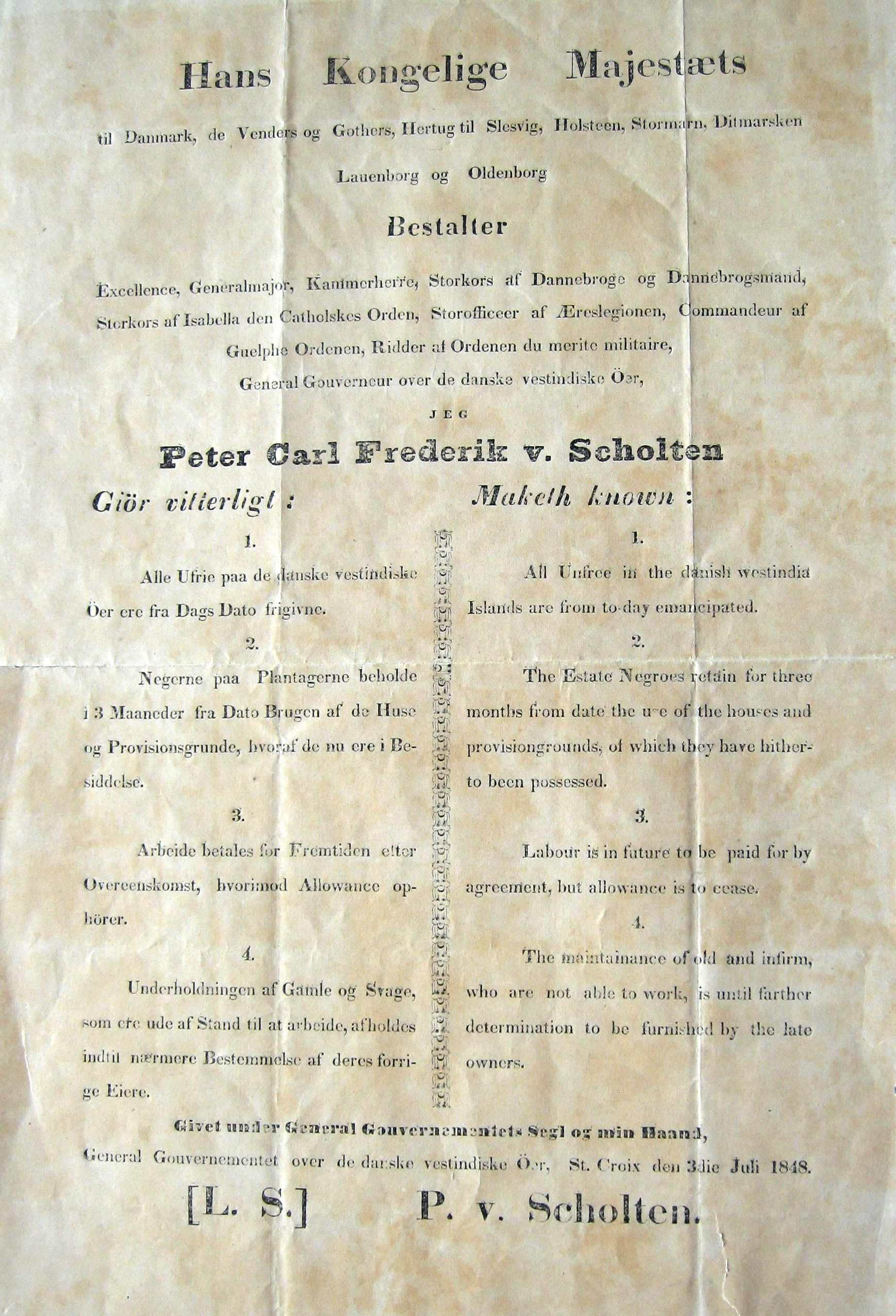
Emancipation proclamation, 1848

Trading in slaves was abolished in 1792, but with a ten-year implementation for the ban on importation. In 1827 reforms were attempted by Governor-General Peter von Scholten to improve the conditions for freedmen. Scholten was aware that free Afro-Caribbean people were obligated to perform state duties equal to other citizens but did not have the same civil rights. Changes in the status of Afro-Caribbean people, with the recent independence of Haiti, prompted the reform efforts. Under Scholten's plan, freedmen would be divided into two groups, those who carried freedom papers curtailing their civil rights and those who carried citizenship papers allowing them equal status with other Danish citizens. Under his plan, all free Afro-Caribbean persons with 1/16th-African ancestry (fusti) would automatically qualify for full and equal status as other citizens. Fully African (sort), biracial (mulat), 1/4th-African (musti), or 1/8th-African (casti) persons would remain both free and Danish, but would continue to have fewer rights. The proposal was submitted to the king in 1830, containing provisions for women and children and emancipation of slaves, as well. A married woman was required to hold the same status as her husband, an unmarried woman's civil status was to be determined by the Governor-General based upon her social and educational position, and children derived their status from their mother. Slaves were encouraged to work for their own manumission and if they paid their own fees, the cost of freedom was significantly lower. The plan was approved by the king in 1830 and went into effect when it was published in the Danish West Indies in 1831.

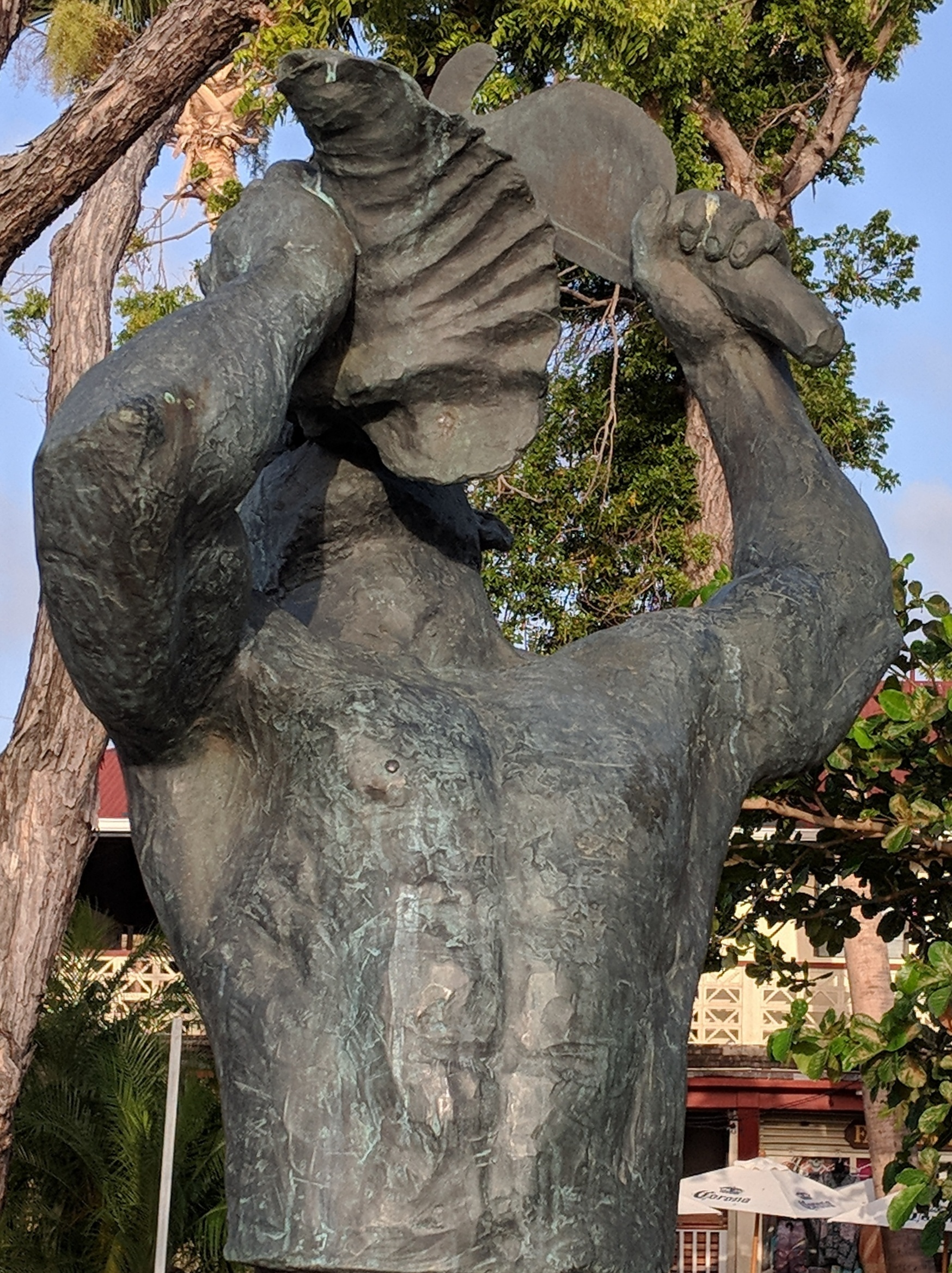
The conch blower in the "Freedom Statue" depicts the slaves' call to action in 1848

Scholten's Plan was immediately met with resistance by the islanders and was modified in 1834 to grant all free people of color equal status with whites, except newly released freedmen. Within the first three years of freedom, this transition class would be on probation and gradually earn civil rights. At the end of three years, the police superintendent or a priest, would determine if adequate progression had been made for full civil rights. That year he also proposed an emancipation plan, spurred because of Britain's abolition plan in the British West Indies. Under this plan, slaves received Sunday and an additional day off per week, which they could use to earn an independent livelihood, were given some property and inheritance rights, and were allowed to marry. Slavery was allowed to continue in the colonies until 1847, when a new law gave newborns immediate freedom, but required other slaves to work for their masters for twelve years to gain their freedom. The following year, after a protest by 8,000 slaves at the government headquarters, full emancipation was granted. Emancipation of the slaves necessitated new legislation to address new social conditions. Few inhabitants in the islands were Danish citizens or spoke Danish and there was little desire to give them representation in the Rigsdag, the first Danish legislature, created in 1849. Limited suffrage in the colonies for male citizens aged 25 years or more who met property qualifications was established in 1849. Danish law at that time did not define who were citizens, but since 1776, those entitled to certain rights were assumed to be indfødsret (indigenous, entitled to birthrights), either born in the territory or born abroad to native-born parents. The Colonial Law of 1852, extended all the laws of Denmark to the West Indies possessions and provided the authority for the two Councils to advise on ordinances for local conditions, subject to approval of the Danish crown and legislature.

In 1863 a new Colonial Law was created, requiring that in addition to meeting property requirements, male inhabitants were eligible to have franchise if they had Danish birthrights. In 1871, Act No. 54 provided that Danish persons could lose their birthrights if they took another nationality. To repatriate, they could reestablish residence in Denmark and if that was insufficient to release them from the other nationality, after a two-year residency could notify the Minister of the Interior that they chose to be released from foreign nationality and to be reinstated as Danish. At that time, there was no specific naturalization scheme in Denmark, but establishing a permanent residence entitled them to be considered Danish subjects, without birthrights. The confusion regarding status, as well as the need for international cooperation, necessitated the passage in 1898 of Act No. 42, Acquisition and Loss of Birthright. The law established that legitimate children of Danish fathers and illegitimate children of Danish mothers acquired birthright nationality. Children born in Denmark to non-Danish parents acquired nationality upon reaching majority at the age of nineteen, if they had no other nationality and had not made a declaration that they did not want to be Danish. A married woman was required to derive her nationality from their husband. If a couple had children together prior to marriage, later married, and the husband was a foreigner, the children lost their nationality along with their mother upon marriage. (Note: Governance documents for the Danish West Indies confirm that all the laws of Denmark applied to Danish possessions, but there is no indication in the Danish National Archives that the Constitution of 1849 or the Penal Code Revision of 1866 were extended to the colonies. Historian Rosalyn Terborg-Penn also confirmed that when Danish women gained the right to vote in 1915, no effort was made to extend the franchise to women in the colonies.) The Colonial Law was revised in 1906, but changed little from the earlier version. Those entitled to vote were males of good character, born in the Danish West Indies or having resided there for five years, who were at a minimum 25 years old and met property requirements. It also reiterated that the common law and statutory laws of Denmark were applicable in the colonies.

=== United States period (1917–present) ===
==== Establishing nationality for the Virgin Islands (1917–1952) ====
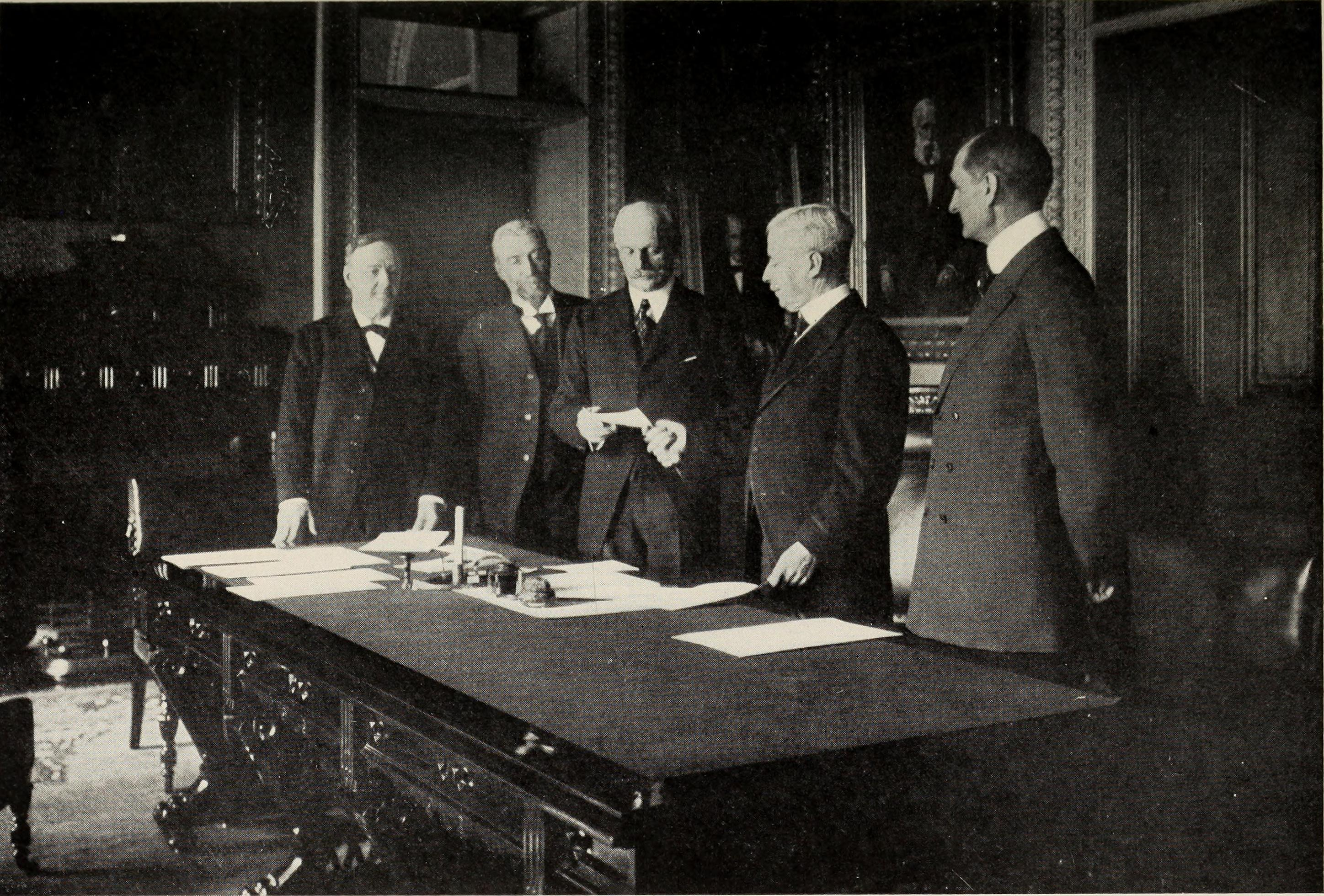
1917 money transfer after the Treaty of the Danish West Indies

In 1917, the United States, purchased the islands to establish a naval safety net for the Panama Canal and prevent German acquisition of the islands. Under terms of the Treaty of the Danish West Indies, island residents were given the option to retain their Danish nationality by declaring within one year their desire to keep it. Failure to make such declaration would be interpreted as an acceptance of US nationality. Language in the treaty reserved the right for the US Congress to determine the civil and political rights of the inhabitants. In 1920, a letter clarifying the status of Virgin Islanders written by the Acting US Secretary of State, Frank L. Polk, confirmed that they were non-citizen nationals, under the protection of the United States. In 1922, the Cable Act was passed, partially repealing provisions for married women to derive nationality from a husband, if the husband was eligible for US nationality. Ineligible husbands included those that were racially excluded, anarchists, or practitioners of polygamy and wives were still excluded from individual nationality, if the husband was barred for any reason.

In 1927, the Act Conferring United States Citizenship on the Virgin Islands (44 Stat. 1234) collectively naturalized all persons who had renounced Danish nationality by failure to declare a desire to retain it, all natives of the islands who were not nationals of any foreign nation, all natives of the islands residing in the continental United States who were not nationals of any foreign nation, and all persons born in the Virgin Islands on or after 1917 who were US non-citizen nationals. The Act required that the persons had been residing in the Virgin Islands both on January 17, 1917, and on February 25, 1927, or had been residing in the Virgin Islands on the former date and were residing in the continental United States or Puerto Rico on the later date. It granted island natives who had been outside the Virgin Islands, but in the United States, on January 17, 1917, and February 25, 1927, to naturalize within one year by petition. It also established a District Court in the Virgin Islands which had the authority of naturalizing aliens and granted statutory federal citizenship to Virgin Islanders.

The 1927 Act omitted provisions for native Virgin Islanders residing anywhere other than the islands or continental United States on January 17, 1917; the United States, Puerto Rico or the Virgin Islands on February 25, 1927; or regardless of when they were born did not reside in the United States, Puerto Rico or the Virgin Islands on either date. Other problems with the Act were that married women, who had lost their nationality because of marriage with a foreigner, even if they met the residency requirements on the specified dates and were native Virgin Islanders, did not qualify for the collective naturalization and the Act was silent on the matter of children born after the effective date of the Act. Because of these discrepancies, an Act of June 28, 1932 (47 Stat. 336), provided that any Virgin Islanders or their children born after January 17, 1917, who were as of the date of the Act residing in the continental US, the Panama Canal Zone, Puerto Rico, the Virgin Islands or any other insular possession of the United States who had not otherwise acquired US nationality with statutory citizenship were naturalized and for a two-year period those residing in foreign countries could be naturalized without being classed as non-quota immigrants upon admission to the United States. Revisions to the Cable Act, codified in the Equal Nationality Act of 1934 allowed children born abroad from that date to derive nationality from their US-national mother, if she had resided in US territory before the child's birth. Children born before 1934 were excluded from deriving nationality from their mother; however, for the first time foreign husbands of US-national women were granted preferential requirements for naturalization.

Amendments to the Cable Act and nationality laws continued until 1940, when married women were granted individual nationality without restrictions based upon their spouse. The Nationality Act of 1940 codified into a single federal statute, all the various laws and decisions by the Supreme Court of the United States concerning nationality. It clarified the status of non-citizen nationals confirming that they owed allegiance to the United States but did not necessarily acquire all the rights and responsibilities of citizenship. Because the 1940 Act omitted a section on birth in the Virgin Islands in Chapter II – Nationality at Birth, as it did for Puerto Rico (Section 202) and the Canal Zone (Section 203), confusion continued. Failure to mention the 1927 or 1932 Acts in the 1940 Act, resulted in the denial of nationality by immigration officials for Virgin Islanders seeking a Certificate of Derivative Citizenship in the United States, under provisions of Section 339 of the 1940 Act. Subsequently, the Immigration and Nationality Act of 1952, codified under Title 8 of the United States Code, rectified the confusion, adding in 8 U.S.C. § 1406 language confirming that Virgin Islanders born on or after January 17, 1917, and prior to February 25, 1927, were naturalized and became statutory citizens as of the latter date, and anyone born after February 25, 1927, in the Virgin Islands acquired nationality and statutory citizenship at birth.

==== Establishing citizenship for the Virgin Islands (1917–1981) ====
Based on various rulings by the US Supreme Court in the Insular Cases (1901–1922), nationals residing in unincorporated territories and insular possessions of the United States, who were not on a path toward statehood, were not automatically extended all rights of the US Constitution. Rights could be extended as determined by the US Congress. The Congressional Act of March 3, 1917 did not provide for a civilian government, but instead allowed the establishment of a military governor and retention of the Danish Colonial Law of 1906. Naval officers governed the territory between 1917 and 1931. On February 27, 1931, Executive Order 5566, issued by President Herbert Hoover to establish a civilian government, organized under the supervision of the United States Secretary of the Interior.

In 1936, the first Organic Act was passed for the Virgin Islands establishing its constitutional documents. A territorial legislature was established, which would remove the income and property prerequisites for voting. Universal suffrage was approved in the Virgin Islands in 1938. In 1952, hearings began for proposals to increase self-governance in the islands and in 1954, the Organic Act was revised. In 1964, further revisions were unsuccessfully proposed, but in subsequent years legislation was passed for the election of the governor and lieutenant governor (1968), for sending a representative to the US Congress (1972), and for the drafting of a constitution (1976). In 1976, the US Congress passed Public Law 94-584, authorizing the Virgin Islands to draft their own constitution. Referendums on drafts were held in 1979 and 1981, but did not gain majority support.

== Current system ==
=== Nationality acquisition and federal citizenship ===
Because of the various laws passed concerning the Virgin Islands' nationality and citizenship, Virgin Islanders have acquired nationality and federal citizenship by various means. These include by birth in one of the fifty states or District of Columbia; becoming naturalized; under the terms of the Treaty of the Danish West Indies; under provisions of the Citizenship Act of 1927, as amended in 1932; and since 1952, by birth in the Virgin Islands. Likewise, federal statutory citizenship has been acquired through the Citizenship Act of 1927 and its various amendments through time, and shaped by the US Congress and Supreme Court rulings. Because federal citizenship is derived by statute, rather than the constitution, citizens of the Virgin Islands have no representation in the US Senate, though they have a non-voting delegate in the US House of Representatives; are unable to vote in the Electoral College, and do not have full protection under the US Constitution. They are required by the Naval Appropriations Act of 1921 to pay the equivalent of federal income taxes into the Virgin Islands Treasury, rather than directly paying federal income tax. The amount of federal assistance available to island citizens through programs like Temporary Assistance for Needy Families, Medicaid, and Supplemental Security Income is less than that available to US citizens in the continental United States.

In the twenty-first century, territorial citizens have challenged the limits to their federal citizenship in a series of lawsuits. In 2015, residents of the Virgin Islands, joined residents of Guam and Puerto Rico as plaintiffs in Segovia v. Board of Election Commissioners (201 F. Supp. 3d 924, 939, N.D. Ill., 2016) to challenge discrepancies in the application of the Uniformed and Overseas Citizens Absentee Voting Act among unincorporated territories. Though they lost their case and the United States Court of Appeals for the Seventh Circuit dismissed an appeal based on lack of standing, ahead of the 2020 elections, citizens from the Virgin Islands and Guam, who had formerly lived in Hawaii, instituted a similar action, Reeves v. United States, challenging their lack of voting rights.

=== Domestic citizenship ===
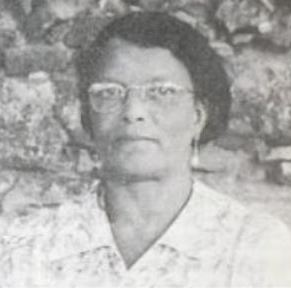
Suffragist Boschulte

Most of the population of the US Virgin Islands were disenfranchised under the Danish Colonial Law of 1906. By the middle of the 1930s less than 1,500 people of the 20,000 inhabitants could vote. Once a civilian government was established, women began to press for the right to vote. Local business women and teachers like Bertha C. Boschulte, Ella Gifft, Eulalie Stevens, and Edith L. Williams, aware of developments in Puerto Rico and the United States, began actively pursuing suffrage on St. Thomas. The St. Thomas Teachers' Association filed a lawsuit in the United States District Court for the Virgin Islands claiming that omitting qualified women from voting contravened the Nineteenth Amendment to the United States Constitution. Judge Albert Levitt ruled in their favor in November 1935. Williams attempted to register to vote the following month, followed by other women. The Board of Elections rejected their registrations, and the St. Thomas Teachers' Association selected Williams, Eulalie Stevens, and Anna M. Vessup, each of whom met the voting restrictions qualifications except in regard to gender, to petition the same court for a Writ Of Mandamus, a type of court order requiring a public duty to be performed, compelling the election officers to register women. Levitt again ruled in their favor, and the women were allowed to vote in the 1936 election. Their success led to activism for women to register to vote in St. Croix and St. John.

The governance of the Virgin Islands remains grounded in the 1954 Revised Organic Act of the Virgin Islands. Five Constitutional Conventions have been held and none has successfully resulted in the adoption of a Constitution. The most recent attempt was the Fifth Constitutional Convention of the U.S. Virgin Islands, which convened in 2007 and passed a draft constitution in 2009 that was rejected by the US Congress in 2010. In 2020, the Virgin Islands Senate passed a resolution to hold another Constitutional Convention. Public opinion was divided as to whether an attempt should be made to draft another constitution, or whether the Revised Organic Act of 1954 should be adopted and amended as the constitution.

== See also ==
- Demographics of the United States Virgin Islands
