= Visa requirements for Danish citizens =

Administrative entry restrictions

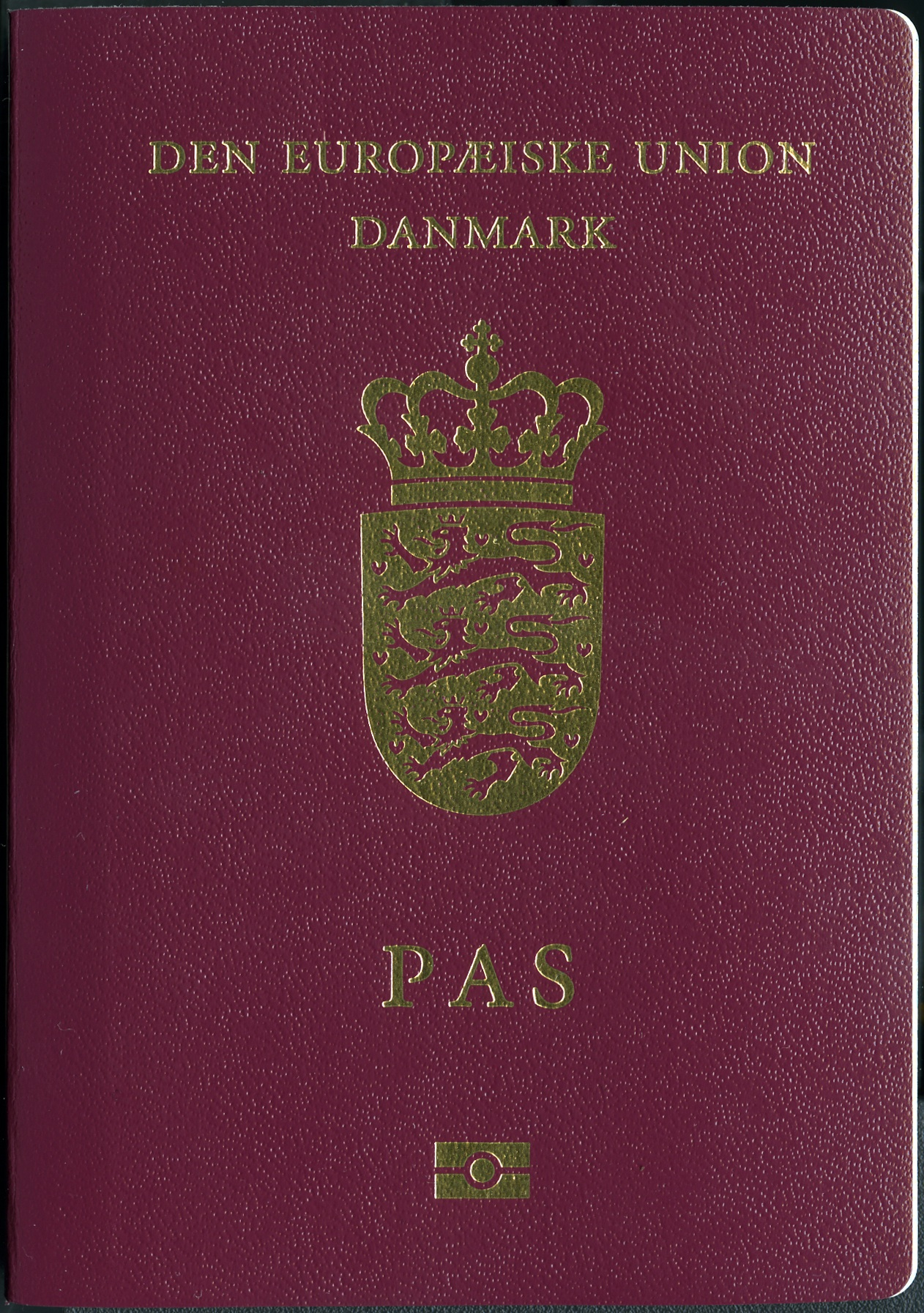
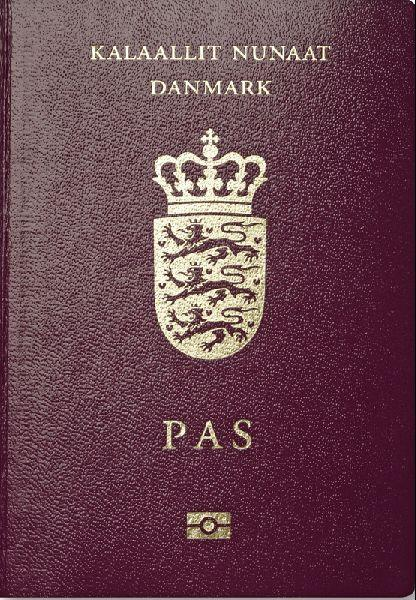
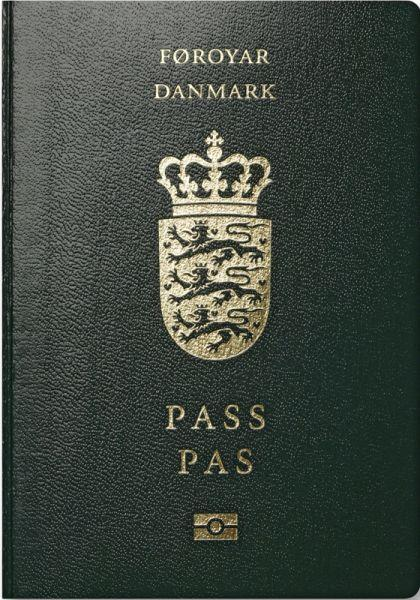
The front cover of the contemporary biometric Danish passport, Greenlandic passport and the Faroese passport for citizens of the Kingdom.

Visa requirements for Danish citizens are administrative entry restrictions by the authorities of other states placed on citizens of the Kingdom of Denmark as a sovereign state comprising the three constituent countries: Denmark, Greenland and the Faroe Islands.

As a member state of the European Union, Danish citizens enjoy freedom of movement within the European Economic Area (EEA). The Citizens’ Rights Directive defines the right of free movement for citizens of the EEA. Through bilateral agreements freedom of movement is extended to Switzerland, and all EU and EFTA nationals are not only visa-exempt but are legally entitled to enter and reside in each other's countries.

In order to travel to another country, a Danish citizen requires a passport, except within the Nordic Passport Union, where no travel document is formally required. However, an identity document such as a driving licence is useful.

As of 2026, holders of a Danish passport may travel to 185 countries and territories without a travel visa, or with a visa on arrival. The Danish passport ranks (Note: Using dense ranking.) 4th in terms of travel freedom, according to the Henley Passport Index. It is also ranked 3rd by the Global Passport Power Rank.

== Visa requirements map ==
Visa requirements for Danish citizens holding ordinary passports Kingdom of Denmark Full freedom of movement (Nordic passport union) Freedom of movement Visa not required / ESTA / eTA / eVisitor Visa on arrival eVisa Visa available both on arrival or online Visa required

== Visa requirements ==
Country	Visa requirement	Allowed stay	Notes (excluding departure fees)
Afghanistan	eVisa	30 days	Visa is not required in case born in Afghanistan or can proof that one of their parents is a national of Afghanistan or born in Afghanistan.; e-Visa : Visitors must arrive at Kabul International (KBL).
Albania	Visa not required	90 days	
Algeria	Visa required		
Andorra	Visa not required		
Angola	Visa not required	30 days	Maximum 3 entries per calendar year; 30 days per trip, but no more than 90 days within any 1 calendar year for tourism purposes only.; Visitors must have a return/onward ticket and a hotel reservation confirmation.; An International Certificate of Vaccination is required.
Antigua and Barbuda	Visa not required	6 months	
Argentina	Visa not required	90 days	
Armenia	Visa not required	180 days	
Australia	eVisitor	90 days	90 days on each visit in 12-month period if granted.
Austria	Visa not required	Freedom of movement.	
Azerbaijan	eVisa	30 days	
Bahamas	Visa not required	8 months	
Bahrain	eVisa / Visa on arrival	14 days	
Bangladesh	Visa on arrival	30 days	
Barbados	Visa not required	90 days	
Belarus	Visa not required	30 days	Visa-free until 31 December 2024.
Belgium	Visa not required	Freedom of movement.	
Belize	Visa not required		
Benin	eVisa	30 days	Must have an international vaccination certificate.
Bhutan	eVisa		Must pay 100 USD per person per day for Sustainable Development Fee
Bolivia	Visa not required	90 days	
Bosnia and Herzegovina	Visa not required	90 days	90 days within any 6-month period.
Botswana	Visa not required	90 days	
Brazil	Visa not required	90 days	90 days within any 180 day period.
Brunei	Visa not required	90 days	
Bulgaria	Visa not required	Freedom of movement.	
Burkina Faso	eVisa	1 month	
Burundi	eVisa / Visa on arrival	1 month	
Cambodia	eVisa / Visa on arrival	30 days	
Cameroon	eVisa		
Canada	eTA / Visa not required	6 months	eTA required if arriving by air.
Cape Verde	EASE	30 days	Must register online at least five days prior to arrival.
Central African Republic	Visa required		
Chad	eVisa	90 days	
Chile	Visa not required	90 days	
China	Visa not required	30 days	Temporarily visa-free from 8 November 2024 to 31 December 2026.; 240-hour (10-day) visa-free transit to a third country or region (including Hong Kong, Macau or Taiwan) using any mode of transport. Must have a confirmed onward ticket/itinerary, and enter through 1 of 64 approved ports.; During which, may freely travel within the 24 provinces permitted for visa-free transit and engage in tourism, business, and visits.; 24-hour visa-free transit to a third country or region (including Hong Kong, Macau, and Taiwan), is available at most international airports, without leaving the airport.; Travellers who need to leave the airport may obtain a temporary entry permit from immigration.; 5-day port visa (Visa on Arrival) for Shenzhen if arriving at designated ports of entry from Hong Kong by land or sea, for stays within Shenzhen.; 3-day port visa (Visa on Arrival) if arriving in Zhuhai or Xiamen at designated ports of entry, for stays within the respective city.; 15-day visa-free entry for cruise ship passengers in tour groups, if arriving at any cruise port along China's coastline, including but not limited to Tianjin; Dalian; Shanghai; Lianyungang; Wenzhou; Zhoushan; Xiamen; Qingdao; Guangzhou; Shenzhen; Beihai; Haikou; Sanya. May further travel inland to all regions of coastal provinces (and equivalents) and Beijing.; May apply for a port visa (Visa on Arrival) if travelling for an urgent, qualified reason. Prior clearance for port visa is highly recommended or may be denied boarding by airlines.
Colombia	Visa not required	180 days	90 days - extendable up to 180-days stay within a 1-year period.
Comoros	Visa on arrival	45 days	
Republic of the Congo	Visa required		
Democratic Republic of the Congo	eVisa	7 days	
Costa Rica	Visa not required	180 days	
Côte d'Ivoire	eVisa	3 months	e-Visa can be picked up at the Port Bouet Airport in Abidjan. The eVisa is valid for 90 days and is issued within 48 hours.
Croatia	Visa not required	Freedom of movement.	
Cuba	eVisa	90 days	Can be extended up to 90 days with a fee.
Cyprus	Visa not required	Freedom of movement.	
Czech Republic	Visa not required	Freedom of movement.	
Djibouti	eVisa	90 days	
Dominica	Visa not required	90 days	90 days within any 180 day period.
Dominican Republic	Visa not required	90 days	
Ecuador	Visa not required	90 days	
Egypt	eVisa / Visa on arrival	30 days	
El Salvador	Visa not required	3 months	
Equatorial Guinea	eVisa		Must arrive via Malabo International Airport, processing fee 75 USD
Eritrea	Visa required		
Estonia	Visa not required	Freedom of movement.	
Eswatini	Visa not required	30 days	
Ethiopia	eVisa / Visa on arrival	up to 90 days	Visa on arrival is obtainable only at Addis Ababa Bole International Airport.; e-Visa holders must arrive via Addis Ababa Bole International Airport.; e-Visa is available for 30 or 90 days.
Fiji	Visa not required	4 months	
Finland	Visa not required	Freedom of movement.	
France	Visa not required	Freedom of movement.	
Gabon	eVisa	90 days	Electronic visa holders must arrive via Libreville International Airport.
Gambia	Visa not required	90 days	
Georgia	Visa not required	1 year	
Germany	Visa not required	Freedom of movement.	
Ghana	eVisa		
Greece	Visa not required	Freedom of movement.	
Grenada	Visa not required	3 months	
Guatemala	Visa not required	90 days	
Guinea	eVisa	90 days	
Guinea-Bissau	Visa on arrival	90 days	
Guyana	Visa not required	90 days	
Haiti	Visa not required	90 days	
Honduras	Visa not required	90 days	
Hungary	Visa not required	Freedom of movement.	
Iceland	Visa not required	Freedom of movement.	
India	eVisa	30 days	e-Visa holders must arrive via 32 designated airports (Note: Ahmedabad; Amritsar; Bagdogra; Bengaluru; Bhubaneswar; Chandigarh; Chennai; Coimbatore; Delhi; Gaya; Goa-Dabolim; Goa-Manohar; Guwahati; Hyderabad; Indore; Jaipur; Kannur; Kochi; Kolkata; Kozhikode; Lucknow; Madurai; Mangaluru; Mumbai; Nagpur; Port Blair; Pune; Surat; Thiruvananthapuram; Tiruchirappalli; Varanasi; Visakhapatnam) or 5 designated seaports. (Note: Chennai; Cochin; Mormugao (Goa); Mumbai; Mangalore); An Indian e-Tourist Visa may only be obtained twice within 1 calendar year.; Foreigners of Pakistani origin or who hold a Pakistani Passport are not eligible for an e-Visa. Foreigners who are not Pakistani nationals, but whose parents or grandparents (either paternal or maternal) were born in, or were permanent residents in Pakistan, are also not eligible for an e-Visa.
Indonesia	e-VOA / Visa on arrival	30 days	
Iran	eVisa	30 days	
Iraq	eVisa	60 days	
Ireland	Visa not required	Freedom of movement.	
Israel	ETA-IL	90 days	3 months for tourism only.
Italy	Visa not required	Freedom of movement.	
Jamaica	Visa not required	90 days	
Japan	Visa not required	90 days	
Jordan	eVisa / Visa on arrival	30 days	Visa can be obtained upon arrival, it will cost a total of 40 JOD, obtainable at most international ports of entry and land border crossings (except King Hussein/Allenby Bridge).
Kazakhstan	Visa not required	30 days	
Kenya	Electronic Travel Authorisation	90 days	Applications can be submitted up to 90 days prior to travel and must be submitted at least 3 days in advance.; eTA fee is 32.50 USD.; Proof of reservation at the hotel where visitors plan to stay is required (if staying with friends, an invitation letter is also acceptable).; Yellow fever vaccination certificate is required if coming from endemic countries.
Kiribati	Visa not required	90 days	90 days within any 180 day period.
North Korea	Visa required		
South Korea	Electronical Travel Authorization	90 days	Danish citizens can enter South Korea as a short term visit (e.g., tours, visiting relatives or friends, attending simple meetings) up to 90 days without a visa, though you should remain aware of the quarantine requirements. You must also have an onward or return ticket. It is illegal to work on a tourist visa, whether as a teacher or in any other capacity.; You must be in possession of a Korea Electronic Travel Authorization (K-ETA) to enter Korea visa-free. You can complete your K-ETA application up to 24 hours before boarding your flight and it will be valid for 3 years from the date of approval. There is a small, non-refundable charge.
Kuwait	eVisa / Visa on arrival	3 months	
Kyrgyzstan	Visa not required	60 days	
Laos	eVisa / Visa on arrival	30 days	18 (Note: Savannakhet Airport; Lanetoui - Mengkang (China); Meuangmom - Wan Pong (Myanmar); Banvang - Ban Khok Phai (Thailand); Namngeun - Huay Kon (Thailand); Paksan - Bueng Kan (Thailand); Paktaphan - Pak Saeng (Thailand); Pangmon - Ban Huak (Thailand); Phoudou (Thailand); Dak ta ock - Nam Giang (Vietnam); La Lai (Vietnam); Namkan (Vietnam); Namphao - Cau Treo (Vietnam); Namsoy - Na Meo (Vietnam); Naphao - Cha Lo (Vietnam); Pahang - Long Sap (Vietnam); Panghok - Tây Trang (Vietnam); Phoukeua - Bo Y (Vietnam)) of the 33 border crossings are only open to regular visa holders.; e-Visa may be used to enter Laos through the Luang Prabang, Pakse and Vientiane international airports, 3 Thai-Lao Friendship Bridges (Note: Vientiane (Friendship Bridge 1); Savannakhet (Friendship Bridge 2); Bokeo (Friendship Bridge 4)), in Boten (road and railroad), and in Vientiane (at Khamsavath railway station).; Visa on arrival is available at the Luang Prabang, Pakse and Vientiane international airports, 4 Thai-Lao Friendship Bridges (Note: Vientiane (Friendship Bridge 1); Savannakhet (Friendship Bridge 2); Khammouane (Friendship Bridge 3); Bokeo (Friendship Bridge 4)) and 7 border crossings. (Note: Nongnokkheane - Trapeang Kriel (Cambodia); Boten - Bo han (China); Golden Triangle/Samliemkham (Thailand); Khamsavath railway station (Thailand); Namheuang - Ban Na Kraseng (Thailand); Vang tao - Chongmek (Thailand); Dansavan - Lao Bảo (Vietnam))
Latvia	Visa not required	Freedom of movement.	
Lebanon	Free visa on arrival	1 month	1 month extendable for 2 additional months; Granted free of charge at Beirut International Airport or any other port of entry if there is no Israeli visa or seal, holding a telephone number, an address in Lebanon, and a non refundable return or circle trip ticket.
Lesotho	Visa not required	14 days	44 days eVisa also available
Liberia	eVisa		
Libya	eVisa		
Liechtenstein	Visa not required	Freedom of movement.	
Lithuania	Visa not required	Freedom of movement.	
Luxembourg	Visa not required	Freedom of movement.	
Madagascar	eVisa/Visa on arrival	60 days	
Malawi	eVisa / Visa on arrival	90 days	
Malaysia	Visa not required	90 days	
Maldives	Free visa on arrival	30 days	
Mali	Visa required		
Malta	Visa not required	Freedom of movement.	
Marshall Islands	Visa not required	90 days	90 days within any 180 day period
Mauritania	eVisa		Available at Nouakchott–Oumtounsy International Airport.
Mauritius	Visa not required	180 days	180 days per calendar year for tourism, 120 days per calendar year per business
Mexico	Visa not required	180 days	
Micronesia	Visa not required	90 days	90 days within any 180 day period.
Moldova	Visa not required	90 days	90 days within any 180 day period.
Monaco	Visa not required		
Mongolia	Visa not required	30 days	The Ministry of Foreign Affairs of Mongolia has exempted visas for 34 countries from January 2023 to December 2026.
Montenegro	Visa not required	90 days	
Morocco	Visa not required	90 days	
Mozambique	Visa not required	30 days	Travelers must register on the e-Visa platform at least 48 hours prior to travel and pay a processing fee of 650 MT.
Myanmar	eVisa	28 days	e-Visa holders must arrive via Yangon, Nay Pyi Taw or Mandalay airports or via land border crossings with Thailand — Tachileik, Myawaddy and Kawthaung or India — Rih Khaw Dar and Tamu.; e-Visa available for both tourism (allowed stay is 28 days) or business (allowed stay is 70 days) purposes.
Namibia	eVisa / Visa on arrival	3 months	Can be obtained online or on arrival for a fee of N$1,600 (approximately €82 / US$88).
Nauru	Visa required		
Nepal	Online Visa / Visa on arrival	90 days	
Netherlands	Visa not required	Freedom of movement.	
New Zealand	Electronic Travel Authority	3 months	International Visitor Conservation and Tourism Levy must be paid upon requesting an Electronic Travel Authority.; Holders of an Australian Permanent Resident Visa or Resident Return Visa may be granted a New Zealand Resident Visa on arrival permitting indefinite stay (pursuant to the Trans-Tasman Travel Arrangement), subject to meeting character requirements and obtaining an Electronic Travel Authority prior to departure. Such travellers are not required to pay the International Visitor Conservation and Tourism Levy.
Nicaragua	Visa not required	90 days	
Niger	Visa required		
Nigeria	eVisa	90 days	
North Macedonia	Visa not required	90 days	
Norway	Visa not required	Freedom of movement.	
Oman	Visa not required / eVisa	14 days / 30 days	
Pakistan	eVisa	90 days	
Palau	Visa not required	90 days	90 days within any 180 day period.
Panama	Visa not required	90 days	
Papua New Guinea	Easy Visitor Permit	60 days	
Paraguay	Visa not required	90 days	
Peru	Visa not required	90 days	90 days within any 6-month period.
Philippines	Visa not required	30 days	
Poland	Visa not required	Freedom of movement.	
Portugal	Visa not required	Freedom of movement.	
Qatar	Visa not required	90 days	
Romania	Visa not required	Freedom of movement.	
Russia	eVisa	30 days	
Rwanda	eVisa / Visa on arrival	30 days	
Saint Kitts and Nevis	Electronic Travel Authorisation	3 months	
Saint Lucia	Visa not required	90 days	90 days within any 180 day period.
Saint Vincent and the Grenadines	Visa not required	90 days	90 days within any 180 day period.
Samoa	Visa not required	90 days	90 days within any 180 day period.
San Marino	Visa not required		
São Tomé and Príncipe	Visa not required	15 days	
Saudi Arabia	eVisa / Visa on arrival	90 days	
Senegal	Visa not required	90 days	
Serbia	Visa not required	90 days	90 days within any 6-month period.
Seychelles	Visa not required	3 months	Application can be submitted up to 30 days before travel.; Visitors must upload a reservation confirmation(s) for each visitor's location of stay in Seychelles.; Yellow fever vaccination certificate is required if coming from endemic countries.; Payment of the fee (EUR 10) by credit or debit card.; Valid for one journey only and it expires once exit the country.
Sierra Leone	eVisa / Visa on arrival	3 months / 30 days	
Singapore	Visa not required	90 days	
Slovakia	Visa not required	Freedom of movement.	
Slovenia	Visa not required	Freedom of movement.	
Solomon Islands	Visa not required	90 days	90 days within any 180 day period.
Somalia	eVisa	30 days	Available at Berbera, Borama, Burao, Erigavo and Hargeisa airports.; 30 days, available at Bosaso Airport, Galcaio Airport and Mogadishu Airport.
South Africa	Visa not required	90 days	
South Sudan	eVisa		Obtainable online.; Printed visa authorization must be presented at the time of travel.
Spain	Visa not required	Freedom of movement.	
Sri Lanka	eVisa / Visa on arrival	60 days / 30 days	Sri Lanka introduced an ETA valid for 30 days.
Sudan	Visa required		
Suriname	Visa not required	90 days	An entrance fee of USD 50 or EUR 50 must be paid online prior to arrival.; Multiple entry e-Visa is also available.
Sweden	Visa not required	Freedom of movement.	
Switzerland	Visa not required	Freedom of movement.	
Syria	eVisa		
Tajikistan	Visa not required	30 days	
Tanzania	eVisa / Visa on arrival	90 days	
Thailand	Visa not required	60 days	Can be extended for an additional 30 days
Timor-Leste	Visa not required	90 days	90 days within any 180 day period
Togo	eVisa	15 days	
Tonga	Visa not required	90 days	90 days within any 180 day period
Trinidad and Tobago	Visa not required	90 days	90 days within any 180 day period
Tunisia	Visa not required	90 days	
Turkey	Visa not required	90 days	
Turkmenistan	eVisa		
Tuvalu	Visa not required	90 days	90 days within any 180 day period
Uganda	eVisa	3 months	
Ukraine	Visa not required	90 days	90 days within any 180 day period.
United Arab Emirates	Visa not required	90 days	90 days within any 180 day period.
United Kingdom	ETA UK	6 months	ETA UK (valid for 2 years when issued) required from 2 April 2025.; Adults can use ePassport gates.
United States	Visa Waiver Program	90 days	ESTA is valid for 2 years from the date of issuance.; ESTA is also required when entering the country by cruise ship or land.; A Form I-94 is required for entry into the United States by land. It carries a $30 fee and can be obtained either online or upon arrival.; Visa required for nationals of VWP countries who have travelled or been present in Iran, Iraq, Libya, North Korea, Somalia, Sudan, Syria or Yemen at any time on or after 1 March 2011 or Cuba at any time on or after 12 January 2021, or nationals of VWP countries who are also nationals of Iran, Iraq, North Korea, Sudan or Syria. Exceptions apply if the travel was in military or diplomatic service of the VWP country.
Uruguay	Visa not required	90 days	
Uzbekistan	Visa not required	30 days	
Vanuatu	Visa not required	90 days	90 days within any 180 day period.
Vatican City	Visa not required		
Venezuela	Visa not required	90 days	
Vietnam	Visa not required	45 days	eVisa valid for 90 days is also available.
Yemen	Visa required		
Zambia	Visa not required	90 days	Also eligible for a universal visa.
Zimbabwe	eVisa / Visa on arrival	30 days	Also eligible for a universal visa.

== Territories and disputed areas ==
Visa requirements for Danish citizens for visits to various territories, disputed areas, partially recognized countries and restricted zones:

Europe

- Abkhazia — Visa required.
- Mount Athos — Special permit required (4 days: 25 euro for Orthodox visitors, 35 euro for non-Orthodox visitors, 18 euro for students). There is a visitors' quota: maximum 100 Orthodox and 10 non-Orthodox per day and women are not allowed.
- (Belarus) Brest and Grodno — Visa not required for 10 days.
- Northern Cyprus — Visa free access for 3 months. Passport required.
- (United Nations) UN Buffer Zone in Cyprus — Access Permit is required for travelling inside the zone, except Civil Use Areas.
- Gibraltar — Visa not required.
- Guernsey – Visa not required.
- (Guernsey) Alderney – Visa not required.
- (Guernsey) Sark – Visa not required.
- Isle of Man — Visa not required.
- (Norway) Jan Mayen — permit issued by the local police required for staying for less than 24 hours and permit issued by the Norwegian police for staying for more than 24 hours.
- Jersey – Visa not required.
- Kosovo — visa free for 90 days.
- Closed cities and regions in Russia — special authorization required.
- South Ossetia — Visa free. Multiple entry visa to Russia and three-day prior notification are required to enter South Ossetia.
- Transnistria — Visa free. Registration required after 24h.

Africa

- Eritrea (outside Asmara) — visa covers Asmara only; to travel in the rest of the country, a Travel Permit for Foreigners is required (20 Eritrean nakfa).
- Sahrawi Arab Democratic Republic (Western Sahara controlled territory) — Visa not required up to 3 months.
- Somaliland — Visa issued on arrival (30 days for 30 US dollars, payable on arrival).
- Sudan — All foreigners traveling more than 25 kilometers outside of Khartoum must obtain a travel permit.
- (Sudan) Darfur — Separate travel permit is required.

Asia

- (China) Hainan — Visa not required for 30 days with an invitation letter from an accredited local tour agency, or present a confirmed hotel reservation and return/onward ticket before immigration.
- Hong Kong — Visa not required for 90 days.
- India — Protected Area Permit (PAP) required for whole states of Nagaland and Sikkim and parts of states Manipur, Arunachal Pradesh, Uttaranchal, Jammu and Kashmir, Rajasthan, Himachal Pradesh. Restricted Area Permit (RAP) required for all of Andaman and Nicobar Islands and parts of Sikkim. Some of these requirements are occasionally lifted for a year.
- Iraqi Kurdistan — You can apply for an e-Visa (30 days) to visit the Iraqi Kurdistan Region.
- Kazakhstan — Special permission required for the town of Baikonur and surrounding areas in Kyzylorda Oblast, and the town of Gvardeyskiy near Almaty.
- (Iran) Kish Island — Visitors to Kish Island do not require a visa.
- Macao — Visa not required for 90 days.
- (Malaysia) Sabah and Sarawak — These states have their own immigration authorities and passport is required to travel to them, however the same visa applies.
- Maldives — With the exception of the capital Malé, tourists are generally prohibited from visiting non-resort islands without the express permission of the Government of Maldives.
- North Korea outside Pyongyang – People are not allowed to leave the capital city, tourists can only leave the capital with a governmental tourist guide (no independent moving)
- Palestine — Visa not required. Arrival by sea to Gaza Strip not allowed.
- Taiwan — Visa not required for 90 days.
- (Tajikistan) Gorno-Badakhshan Autonomous Province — OIVR permit required (15+5 Tajikistani Somoni) and another special permit (free of charge) is required for Lake Sarez.
- Turkmenistan — A special permit, issued prior to arrival by Ministry of Foreign Affairs, is required if visiting the following places: Atamurat, Cheleken, Dashoguz, Serakhs and Serhetabat.
- (China) Tibet Autonomous Region — Tibet Travel Permit required (10 US Dollars).
- (United Nations) Korean Demilitarized Zone — restricted zone.
- (United Nations) UNDOF Zone and Ghajar — restricted zones.
- (Vietnam) Phú Quốc — can visit without a visa for up to 30 days.
- Yemen — Special permission needed for travel outside Sanaa or Aden.

Caribbean and North Atlantic

- Anguilla — Visa not required for 3 months.
- Aruba — Visa not required for 30 days.
- (Netherlands) Bonaire, St. Eustatius and Saba — Visa not required for 3 months.
- Bermuda — Visa not required for 21 days (extendable).
- British Virgin Islands — Visa not required for 1 month (extendable).
- Cayman Islands — Visa not required for 6 months.
- Colombia — Visitors arriving at San Andrés and Leticia must buy tourist cards on arrival.
- Curacao — Visa not required for 3 months.
- Montserrat — Visa not required for 6 months.
- (Venezuela) Margarita Island — All visitors are fingerprinted.
- Puerto Rico — Visa not required under the Visa Waiver Program, for 90 days on arrival from overseas for 2 years. ESTA required.
- Saint Pierre and Miquelon — Visa not required.
- Sint Maarten — Visa not required for 3 months.
- Turks and Caicos Islands — Visa not required for 90 days.
- U.S. Virgin Islands — Visa not required under the Visa Waiver Program, for 90 days on arrival from overseas for 2 years. ESTA required.

Oceania

- American Samoa — Electronic authorization for 30 days.
- (Australia) Ashmore and Cartier Islands — special authorisation required.
- (France) Clipperton Island — special permit required.
- Cook Islands — Visa free access for 31 days.
- (Fiji) Lau Province — Special permission required.
- French Polynesia — Visa not required.
- Guam — Visa not required under the Visa Waiver Program, for 90 days on arrival from overseas for 2 years. ESTA required.
- New Caledonia — Visa not required for 3 months.
- Niue — Visa on arrival valid for 30 days is issued free of charge.
- Northern Mariana Islands — Visa not required.
- Pitcairn Islands — 14 days visa free and landing fee US$35 or tax of US$5 if not going ashore.
- United States Minor Outlying Islands — special permits required for Baker Island, Howland Island, Jarvis Island, Johnston Atoll, Kingman Reef, Midway Atoll, Palmyra Atoll and Wake Island.
- Wallis and Futuna — Visa not required.

South Atlantic and Antarctica

- Falkland Islands — A visitor permit is normally issued as a stamp in the passport on arrival, The maximum validity period is 1 month.
- Saint Helena, Ascension and Tristan da Cunha
  - Ascension Island — eVisa for 3 months within any year period.
  - Saint Helena — Entry Permit (£25) for 183 days is issued on arrival.
  - Tristan da Cunha — Permission to land required for 15/30 pounds sterling (yacht/ship passenger) for Tristan da Cunha Island or 20 pounds sterling for Gough Island, Inaccessible Island or Nightingale Islands.
- South Georgia and the South Sandwich Islands — Pre-arrival permit from the Commissioner required (72 hours / 1 month for 110 / 160 pounds sterling).
- Antarctica and adjacent islands — special permits required for French Southern and Antarctic Lands, Argentine Antarctica, (Australia) Australian Antarctic Territory, (Antártica Chilena Province) Chilean Antarctic Territory, (Australia) Heard Island and McDonald Islands, (Norway) Peter I Island, (Norway) Queen Maud Land, (New Zealand) Ross Dependency.
- Arab League — Certain countries will deny access to holders of Israeli visas or passport stamps of Israel because of the Arab League boycott of Israel.

== Non-ordinary passports ==
Holders of various categories of official Danish passports have additional visa-free access to the following countries - Egypt (diplomatic or service passports), India (diplomatic or official passports), Kazakhstan (diplomatic passports), Pakistan (diplomatic or service passports) and Russia (diplomatic passports).

Holders of diplomatic or service passports of any country have visa-free access to Cape Verde, Ethiopia, Mali and Zimbabwe.

== Non-visa restrictions ==
=== Blank passport pages ===
Many countries require a minimum number of blank pages to be available in the passport being presented, typically one or two pages. Endorsement pages, which often appear after the visa pages, are not counted as being valid or available.

=== Vaccination ===
Cover of the new International Certificate of Vaccination issued by the Bureau of Quarantine in the Philippines since 2021

The African countries of Angola, Benin, Burkina Faso, Burundi, Cameroon, Central African Republic, Democratic Republic of the Congo, Republic of the Congo, Côte d'Ivoire, Gabon, Ghana, Guinea-Bissau, Mali, Niger, Sierra Leone and Togo, South Sudan and Uganda, along with French Guiana in South America, require all incoming passengers older than nine months to one year, to have a current International Certificate of Vaccination or Prophylaxis.

Some other countries require vaccination only if the passenger is coming from an infected area or has visited one recently or has transited for 12 hours in those countries: Algeria, Botswana, Cabo Verde, Chad, Djibouti, Egypt, Eswatini, Ethiopia, Gambia, Ghana, Guinea, Lesotho, Libya, Equatorial Guinea, Eritrea, Madagascar, Malawi, Mauritania, Mauritius, Mozambique, Namibia, Nigeria, Papua New Guinea, Seychelles, Somalia, South Africa, Sudan, Tunisia, Uganda, Tanzania, Zambia and Zimbabwe.

=== Passport validity length ===
Very few countries, such as Paraguay, just require a valid passport on arrival.

However many countries and groupings now require only an identity card – especially from their neighbours. Other countries may have special bilateral arrangements that depart from the generality of their passport validity length policies to shorten the period of passport validity required for each other's citizens or even accept passports that have already expired (but not been cancelled).

Some countries, such as Japan, Ireland and the United Kingdom, require a passport valid throughout the period of the intended stay.

In the absence of specific bilateral agreements, countries requiring passports to be valid for at least 6 more months on arrival include Afghanistan, Algeria, Anguilla, Bahrain, Bhutan, Botswana, British Virgin Islands, Brunei, Cambodia, Cameroon, Cape Verde, Cayman Islands, Central African Republic, Chad, Comoros, Costa Rica, Côte d'Ivoire, Curaçao, Ecuador, Egypt, El Salvador, Equatorial Guinea, Fiji, Gabon, Guinea Bissau, Guyana, Haiti, India, Indonesia, Iran, Iraq, Israel, Jordan, Kenya, Kiribati, Kuwait, Laos, Madagascar, Malaysia, Marshall Islands, Mongolia, Myanmar, Namibia, Nepal, Nicaragua, Nigeria, Oman, Palau, Papua New Guinea, Peru, Philippines, Qatar, Rwanda, Samoa, Saudi Arabia, Singapore, Solomon Islands, Somalia, Sri Lanka, Sudan, Suriname, Tanzania, Thailand, Timor-Leste, Tokelau, Tonga, Turkey, Tuvalu, Uganda, United Arab Emirates, Vanuatu, Venezuela, and Vietnam.

Countries requiring passports valid for at least 4 months on arrival include Micronesia and Zambia.

Countries requiring passports with a validity of at least 3 months beyond the date of intended departure include Azerbaijan, Bosnia and Herzegovina, Honduras, Montenegro, Nauru, Moldova and New Zealand. Similarly, the EEA countries of Iceland, Liechtenstein, Norway, all European Union countries (except Ireland) together with Switzerland also require 3 months validity beyond the date of the bearer's intended departure unless the bearer is an EEA or Swiss national.

Countries requiring passports valid for at least 3 months on arrival include Albania, North Macedonia, Panama, and Senegal.

Bermuda requires passports to be valid for at least 45 days upon entry.

Countries that require a passport validity of at least one month beyond the date of intended departure include Eritrea, Hong Kong, Lebanon, Macau, the Maldives and South Africa.

==== Maximum passport age ====
Countries of the Schengen area require non-EU passports to be less than 10 years old upon entry.

=== Criminal record ===
Some countries, including Australia, Canada, Fiji, New Zealand and the United States, routinely deny entry to non-citizens who have a criminal record, while others impose restrictions depending on the type of conviction and the length of the sentence.

=== Persona non grata ===
The government of a country can declare a diplomat persona non grata, banning them from entering the country or expelling them if they have already entered. In non-diplomatic use, the authorities of a country may also declare a foreigner persona non grata permanently or temporarily, usually because of unlawful activity.

=== Israeli stamps ===
Kuwait, Lebanon, Libya, and Yemen do not allow entry to people with passport stamps from Israel or whose passports have either a used or an unused Israeli visa, or where there is evidence of previous travel to Israel such as entry or exit stamps from neighbouring border posts in transit countries such as Jordan and Egypt.

To circumvent this Arab League boycott of Israel, the Israeli immigration services have now mostly ceased to stamp foreign nationals' passports on either entry to or exit from Israel (unless the entry is for some work-related purposes). Since 15 January 2013, Israel no longer stamps foreign passports at Ben Gurion Airport. Passports are still (as of 22 June 2017) stamped at Erez when passing into and out of Gaza.

Iran refuses admission to holders of passports containing an Israeli visa or stamp that is less than 12 months old.

=== Biometrics ===
Several countries mandate that all travellers, or all foreign travellers, be fingerprinted on arrival and will refuse admission to or even arrest travellers who refuse to comply. In some countries, such as the United States, this may apply even to transit passengers who merely wish to change planes rather than go landside.

Fingerprinting countries/regions include Afghanistan, Argentina, Brunei, Cambodia, China, Ethiopia, Ghana, Guinea, India, Japan, Kenya (both fingerprints and a photo are taken), Malaysia upon entry and departure, Mongolia, Saudi Arabia, the Schengen Area, Singapore, South Korea, Taiwan, Thailand, Uganda, the United Arab Emirates and the United States.

Many countries also require a photo be taken of people entering the country. The United States, which does not fully implement exit control formalities at its land frontiers (although long mandated by its own legislation), intends to implement facial recognition for passengers departing from international airports to identify people who overstay their visa.

Together with fingerprint and face recognition, iris scanning is one of three biometric identification technologies internationally standardised since 2006 by the International Civil Aviation Organization (ICAO) for use in e-passports and the United Arab Emirates conducts iris scanning on visitors who need to apply for a visa. The United States Department of Homeland Security has announced plans to greatly increase the biometric data it collects at US borders. In 2018, Singapore began trials of iris scanning at three land and maritime immigration checkpoints.

== Consular protection of Danish citizens abroad ==
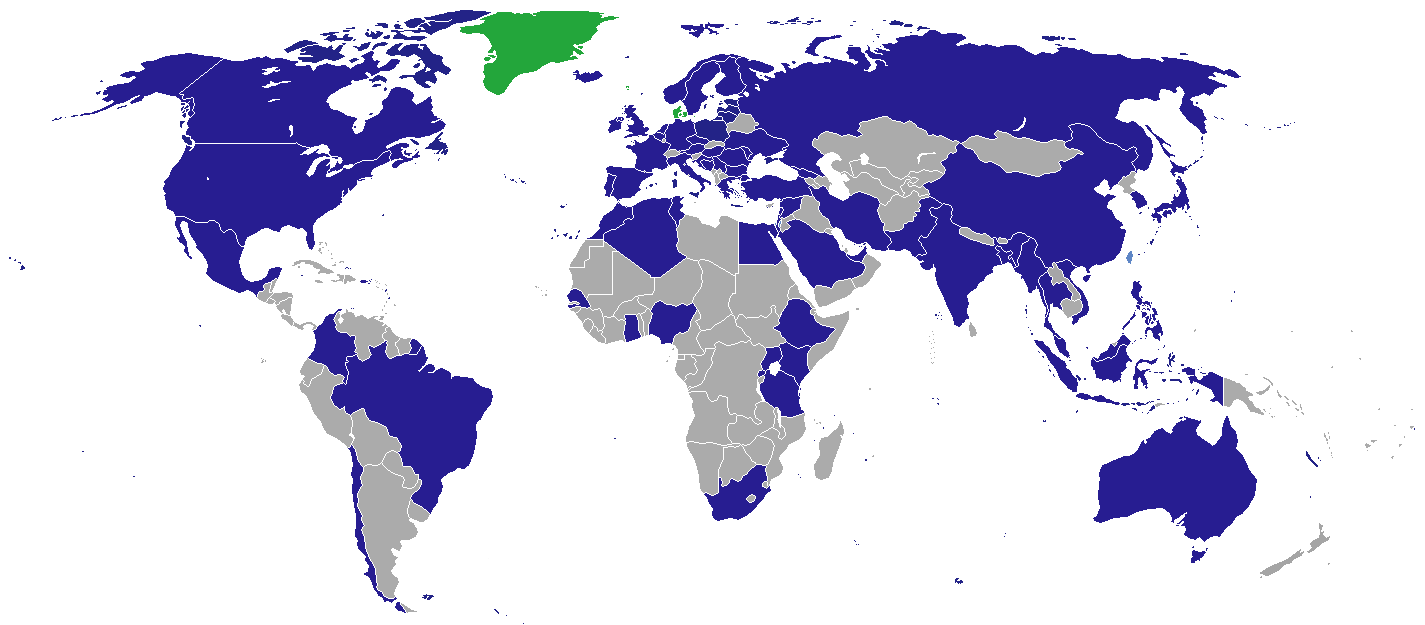
Diplomatic missions of the Kingdom of Denmark

When in a non-EU country where there is no Danish embassy, Danish citizens as EU citizens have the right to get consular protection from the embassy of any other EU country present in that country. Note that the Faroe Islands belong to the Kingdom of Denmark, but not to the EU. Greenland left the EC in 1985, but its inhabitants are regarded as EU citizens. Persons moving to and permanently living in Denmark (proper) from the other parts of the Kingdom can become "full" EU citizens.

Danish citizens may also seek assistance from public officials in the foreign services of any of the Nordic countries, when in a country with no Danish representation. This is afforded by the Helsinki Treaty which states that public officials in the foreign services of any of the Nordic countries shall assist citizens of another Nordic country if that country is not represented in the territory concerned.

== See also ==
- Visa requirements for European Union citizens
- Danish passport
