= West Island Housing Precinct =

West Island housing

- Location within Cocos (Keeling) Islands
- Location on the Cocos (Keeling) Islands

General information
- Status: Completed
- Type: Houses for government employees
- Location: Air Force Road, West Island, Cocos (Keeling) Islands, Australia
- Coordinates: 12.1923°S 96.8319°E
- Completed: 1950s; 1966 (relocation)
- Renovated: 1979
- Client: Australian Government

Technical details
- Material: Cement asbestos

Commonwealth Heritage List
- Official name: West Island Housing Precinct
- Type: Listed place (Historic)
- Designated: 22 June 2004
- Reference no.: 105223

The West Island Housing Precinct is a heritage-listed residential area at Air Force Road, West Island, Cocos (Keeling) Islands, Australia. It was added to the Australian Commonwealth Heritage List on 22 June 2004.

== Description ==
The precinct occupies the narrow strip of land between the airstrip and the ocean with the rows of housing addressing, in plan form, these two dominant factors in life on West Island.

The houses are generally constructed of asbestos cement sheeting over a timber frame. They were designed, and some prefabricated, in Australia.

The dwellings within the precinct include Government House, a number of Residence "Type 2" dwellings, several variations on the "Type 2" style (including the West Island Elevated Houses), many "T Type" - also known as "Type A" - dwellings (the Type T Houses Precinct), and two houses that were relocated from Direction Island in the 1960s.

The Direction Island houses are timber framed and modular. They have verandahs to the long sides which are screened at the rear and distinctive sloped paired posts. The houses were originally located on Direction Island as part of the signal and air rescue station. They were relocated to West Island after 1966 when the station closed.

The "Type T" houses were built during the 1950s and were upgraded in 1979. The houses have three bedrooms, kitchen, bathroom, living room and front porch. The design of the houses is in the shape of a "T" - hence the name.

The "Type 2" houses were also built during the 1950s. Several variations of the houses have been achieved by lengthening the base plan and most have distinctive raking on the end walls. The houses mainly have three bedrooms, kitchen, bathroom and living room with a large hall leading onto the front porch.

The West Island Elevated Houses are larger variations of standard "Type 2" houses and are located to the far south of the island. The Shire Clerk's house has a large added verandah to the west.

Government House was constructed c. 1953 as part of the Australian Government representation on the island. Although part of the West Island Housing Precinct, Government House is significantly different from the other Australian Government houses on the island. The site is enclosed with a white timber fence and has a formal entry. It includes a large asbestos clad residence with separate asbestos clad garage and a brick guest house. There is a formal driveway with white painted edges, a flag pole, fencing and the house is set up for entertaining.

The landscaped setting consists of a flat grassed area interspersed with palm trees and other specimen plantings of tropical vegetation. The combination of 1950s housing, located formally within a domestic cultural landscape that is free of fencing is unusual, if not unique, in an Australian context.

=== Condition ===
The Direction Island houses were relocated to West island in 1966 and rebuilt.

The Type "T" houses were upgraded in 1979 but their integrity remains high. Government House is in good condition. The Elevated Houses and Type Two houses are generally in good condition although some have been modified. The overall condition of the precinct is good.

In 2000 the overall condition of the houses was assessed to be good. A few of the houses have had verandahs and carports added and there is a programme of re-painting the houses. The garden and fencing at Government House requires some attention. It is generally considered that despite the modifications the buildings have retained their integrity.

== Heritage listing ==
The West Island Housing Precinct comprises Type "T" Houses, Government House, the former Direction Island Houses, Elevated Houses and Type Two Houses in a cohesive landscape setting. The consistent style of 1950s asbestos cement sheet housing, featuring plan forms and designs suited to local climatic conditions, unfenced allotments, open grassland and tropical specimen plantings, combine to make the West Island Housing Precinct a rare and relatively intact example of a housing precinct on the Cocos (Keeling) Islands.

The West Island Housing Precinct is significant for its association with the establishment of housing for Australian Government employees in the 1950s who administered and assisted the self determination of the Cocos Malay people. The West Island Housing Precinct is significant in the development of the West Island settlement, which grew after Government House was located on West Island in 1953.

The Type "T" Houses, located in a row adjacent to the ocean, are significant as the predominant early housing type provided for Australian personnel.

Government House, which is of a similar design to early Australian Government houses on the Cocos (Keeling) Islands, includes a formal driveway with white painted edges, fencing, a flag pole, an area for entertaining and is sited with ocean frontage.

The former Direction Island Houses are important as two pre-fabricated houses remaining from the former Direction Island signal and air rescue station which answered calls for assistance from passing ships and aircraft with sick or injured passengers and crew in the 1950s. The Houses were relocated to West Island after 1966, when the station closed. The Elevated Houses and Type Two Houses also contribute to the significance of the Precinct. The Elevated Houses are sited to the far south of West Island, near Government House, suggesting their important status on the Islands. The Type Two Houses form two separate groups within the Precinct.
