= List of Korean War memorials =

A number of memorials have been established to honour people who served in the Korean War (25 June 1950 – 27 July 1953) including :

== Australia ==
- Korean War Memorial, Canberra
- ANZAC Square, Brisbane
- Beaudesert War Memorial
- Cairns War Memorial
- Esk War Memorial
- Gair Park
- Gympie Memorial Park
- Howard War Memorial
- Oxley War Memorial
- Queensland Korean War Memorial
- Sandgate War Memorial Park
- St Andrew's Presbyterian Memorial Church, Innisfail
- Stanthorpe Soldiers Memorial
- Strathpine Honour Board
- Toogoolawah War Memorial
- Warwick War Memorial
- Yeppoon War Memorial

== Belgium ==
- Korean War Memorial, Sint-Pieters-Woluwe, Brussels

== Canada ==
- Fredericton Cenotaph
- Korean War Memorial Wall, Brampton, Ontario
- Saint John War Memorial, Saint John, New Brunswick
- Trenton Cenotaph, Trenton, Ontario
- Monument to the Canadian Fallen (Korean War Memorial), Ottawa, Ontario
- National War Memorial (Canada), Ottawa, Ontario
- "Let's Go" Statue dedicated to the fallen Canadian soldiers during the Korean War, Calgary. Alberta
- Tomb of the Unknown Soldier (Canada), Ottawa, Ontario

== France ==
- Square of the UN French Battalion in Korea, Paris, 4th arrondissement
- Garden of the UN Battalion, Paris, 4th arrondissement

== North Korea ==
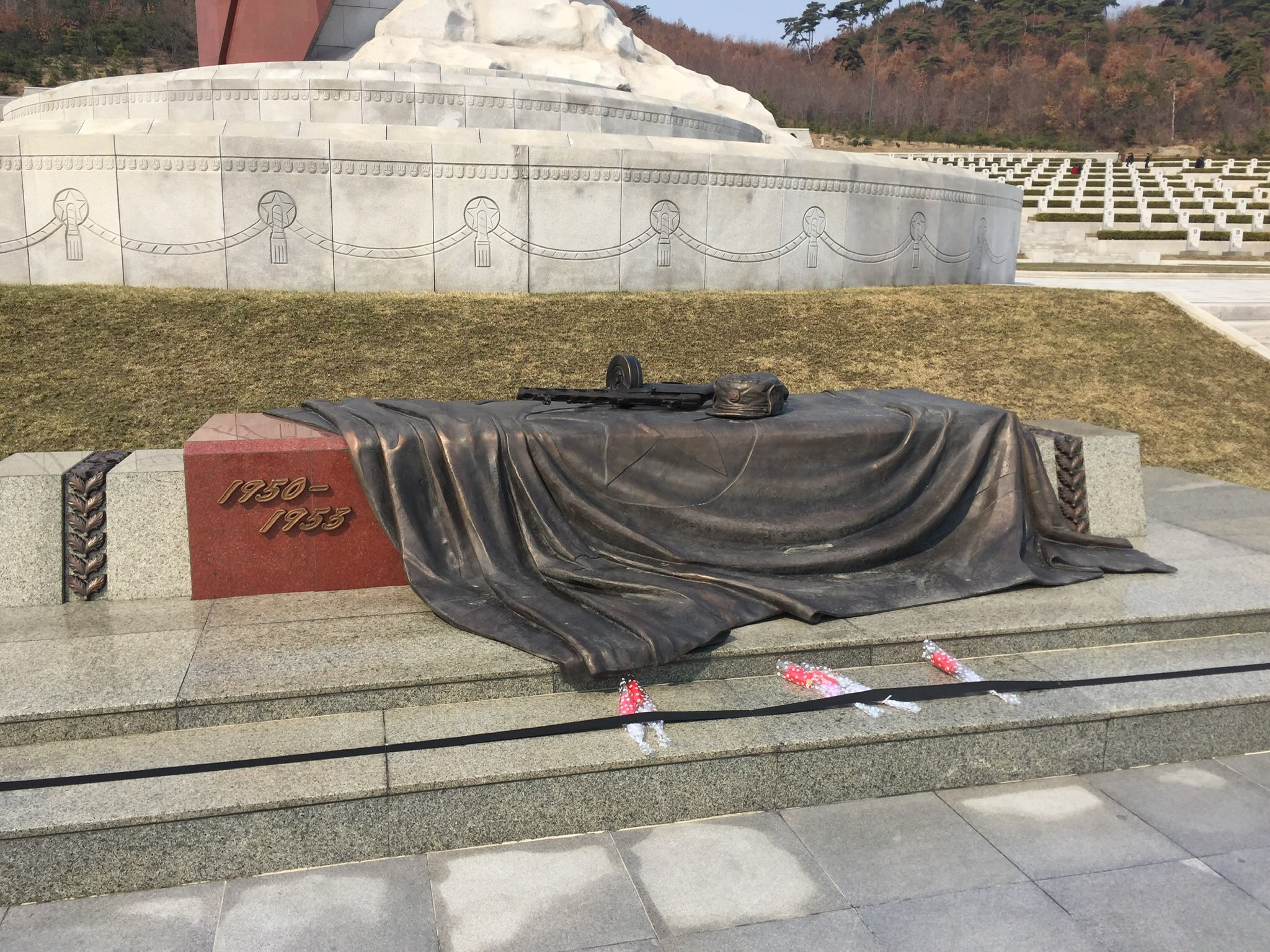
Memorial at the Cemetery of Fallen Fighters of the Korean People's Army, Pyongyang

- North Korea Peace Museum, Panmunjom

== South Korea ==
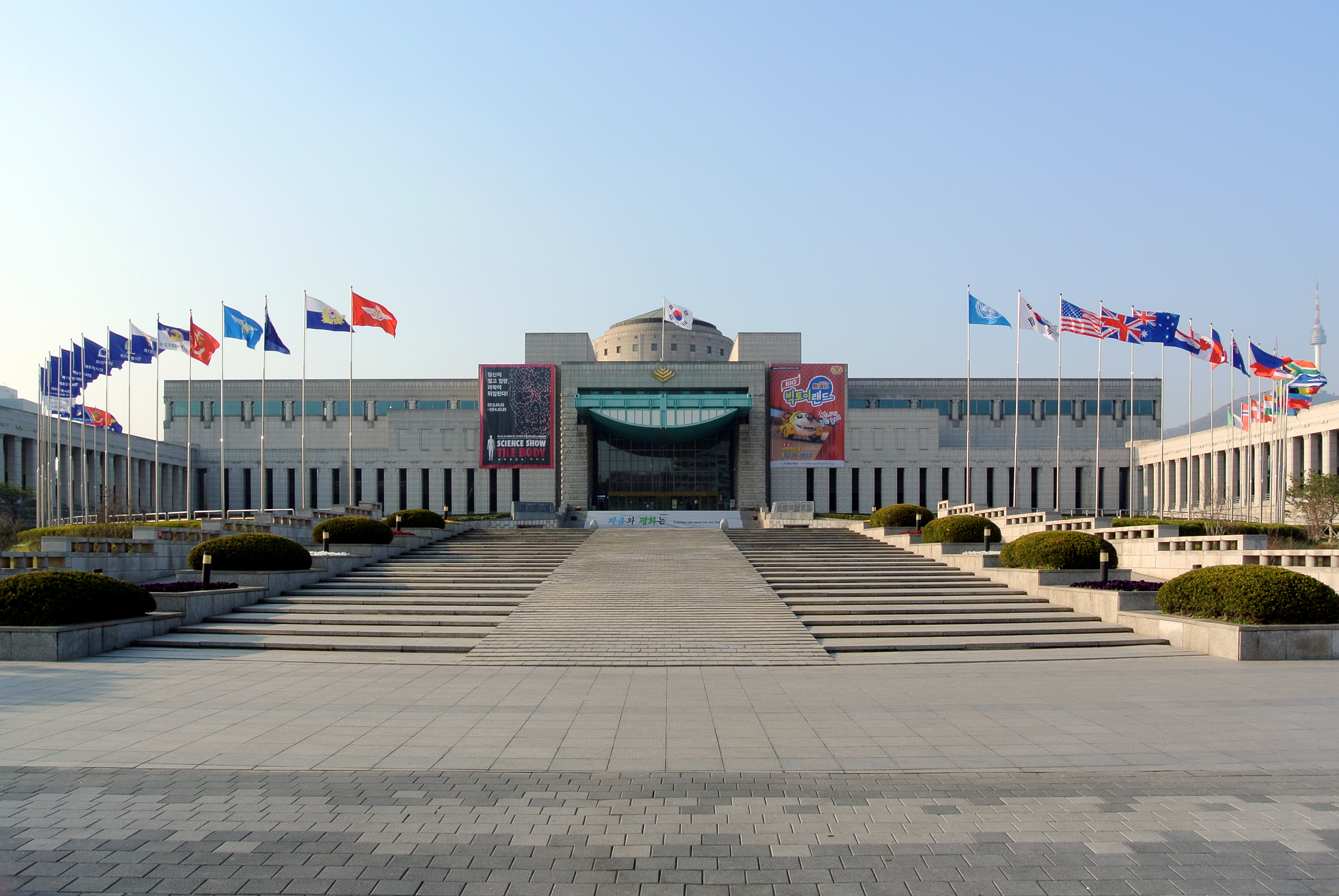
War Memorial of Korea, Seoul

- Cemetery for North Korean and Chinese Soldiers, Jajang-Ro, Papyeong-myeon, Paju
- Daejeon National Cemetery, Yuseong-gu, Daejeon
- Dabudong War Memorial Museum, Chilgok-gun Gyeongsangbuk-do
- Gapyeong Canada Monument, Gapyeong County
- Gloucester Valley Battle Monument, Jeokseong-myeon, Paju City, Gyeonggi-do
- Imjingak Memorial Park, Munsan-eup, Paju-si, Gyeonggi-do
  - Second Infantry Division Memorial
  - 187th Airborne "Rakkasans" Memorial
  - Chamorros of Guam Memorial
  - Japanese American Korean War Veterans Memorial
  - Monument to US Forces in the Korean War Memorial
- Incheon Landing Operation Memorial Hall, Ongnyeon-dong, Yeonsu-gu, Incheon
- Seoul National Cemetery, Dongjak-gu, Seoul
- United Nations Memorial Cemetery, Nam District, Busan
- War Memorial of Korea, Yongsan-dong, Seoul
- French UN Battalion memorial, Hyohaeng Park, Suwon

== Philippines ==
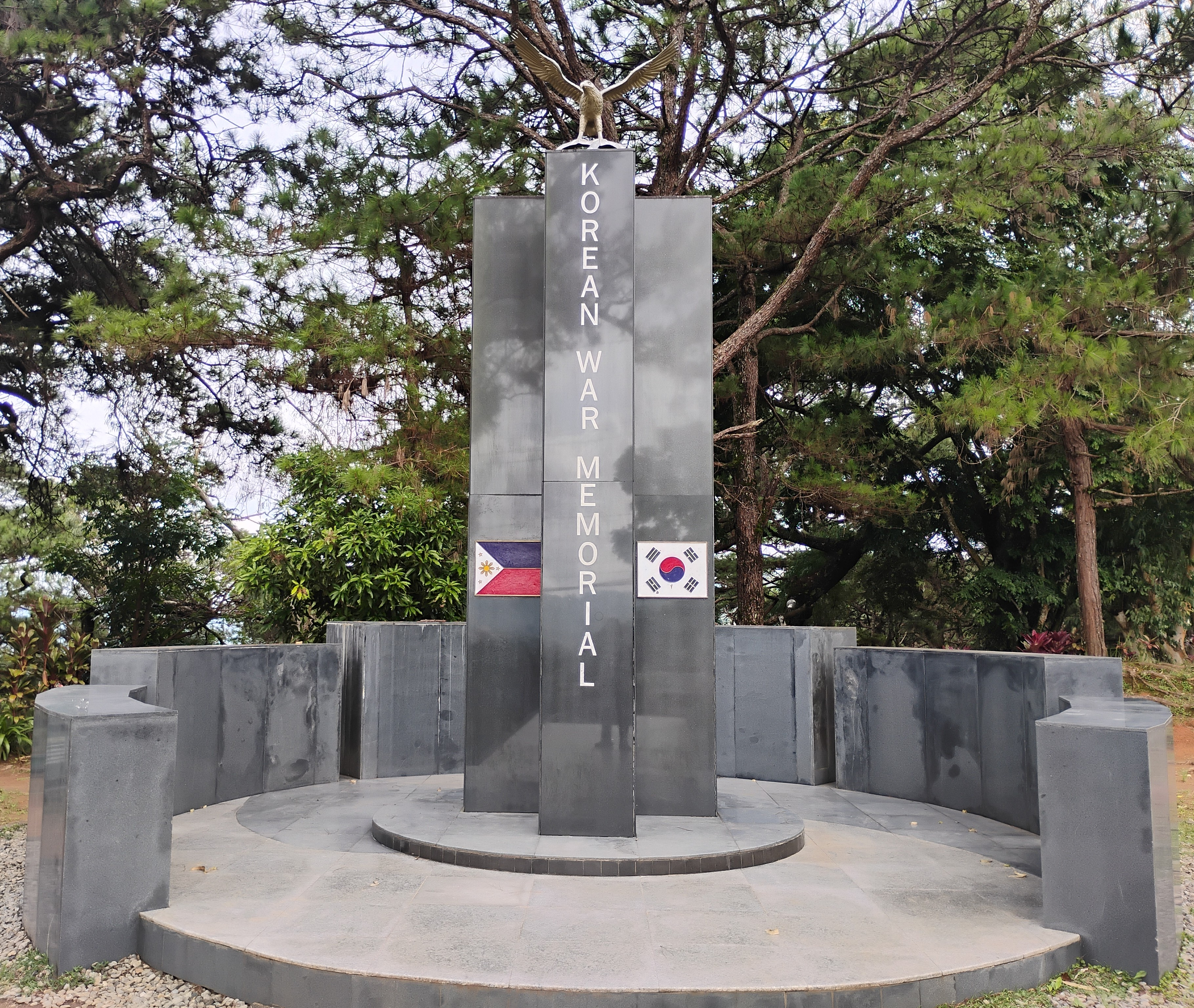
Korean War Memorial, Baguio

- Korean War Memorial Pylon, Libingan ng mga Bayani, Taguig
- Marikina-Yeongdo Friendship Park, Marikina
- Philippine Military Academy, Baguio

== United Kingdom ==
- Korean War Memorial, London
- Scottish Korean War Memorial, Beecraigs Country Park, Torpichen, West Lothian

== United States ==
Memorials

- California Korean War Veterans Memorial, San Joaquin Valley National Cemetery
- Hawaii's Korean War Memorial, Hawaii State Capitol, Honolulu, Hawaii
- Korean War Memorial, Indianapolis, Indiana
- Korean War Memorial, Salem, Oregon
- Korean War Memorial, Nashville, Tennessee
- Korean War Memorial, Olympia, Washington
- Korean War Veterans Memorial, Jersey City, New Jersey
- Korean War Veterans Memorial, Austin, Texas
- Korean War Veterans Memorial, Washington, D.C.
- Massachusetts Korean War Veterans Memorial, Charlestown Naval Shipyard, Charlestown, Massachusetts
- National Infantry Museum’s Korean War Memorial, Columbus, Georgia
- New Jersey Korean War Veterans Memorial, Atlantic City, New Jersey
- Oregon Korean War Memorial, Wilsonville, Oregon
- Philadelphia Korean War Memorial, Penn's Landing, Society Hill
- Pittsburgh Korean War Memorial, North Shore Riverfront Park
- San Francisco Korean War Memorial, Presidio
- South Boston Korean War Memorial, Castle Island
- Wisconsin Korean War Veterans Memorial, Plover, Wisconsin

Roadways dedicated as a Korean War Veterans Memorial Highway or Parkway

- Korean War Veterans Parkway, Staten Island, New York (formerly, the Richmond Parkway)
- New York State Route 59 (part)
- Delaware Route 1 (toll portion)
- Interstate 5 in Oregon
- Interstate 69 in Indiana (part)
- Interstate 70 in Maryland, Frederick County

Bridges dedicated as a Korean War Veterans Memorial Bridge

- Korean War Veterans Memorial Bridge, Nashville, Tennessee

Miscellaneous

- Museum of History in Granite, Felicity, California
- Chamorros Korean War Memorial, Hagåtña, Guam

== See also ==
- List of Union Civil War monuments and memorials
- List of Confederate monuments and memorials
