= RAAF Memorial =

RAAF Memorial may refer to:

- Royal Australian Air Force Memorial, Canberra Australia
- RAAF Memorial, West Island, Cocos (Keeling) Islands, Australia
