= Admiral Beatty Hotel =

Building in Saint John, New Brunswick, Canada

Coordinates: 45°16′22″N 66°03′30″W

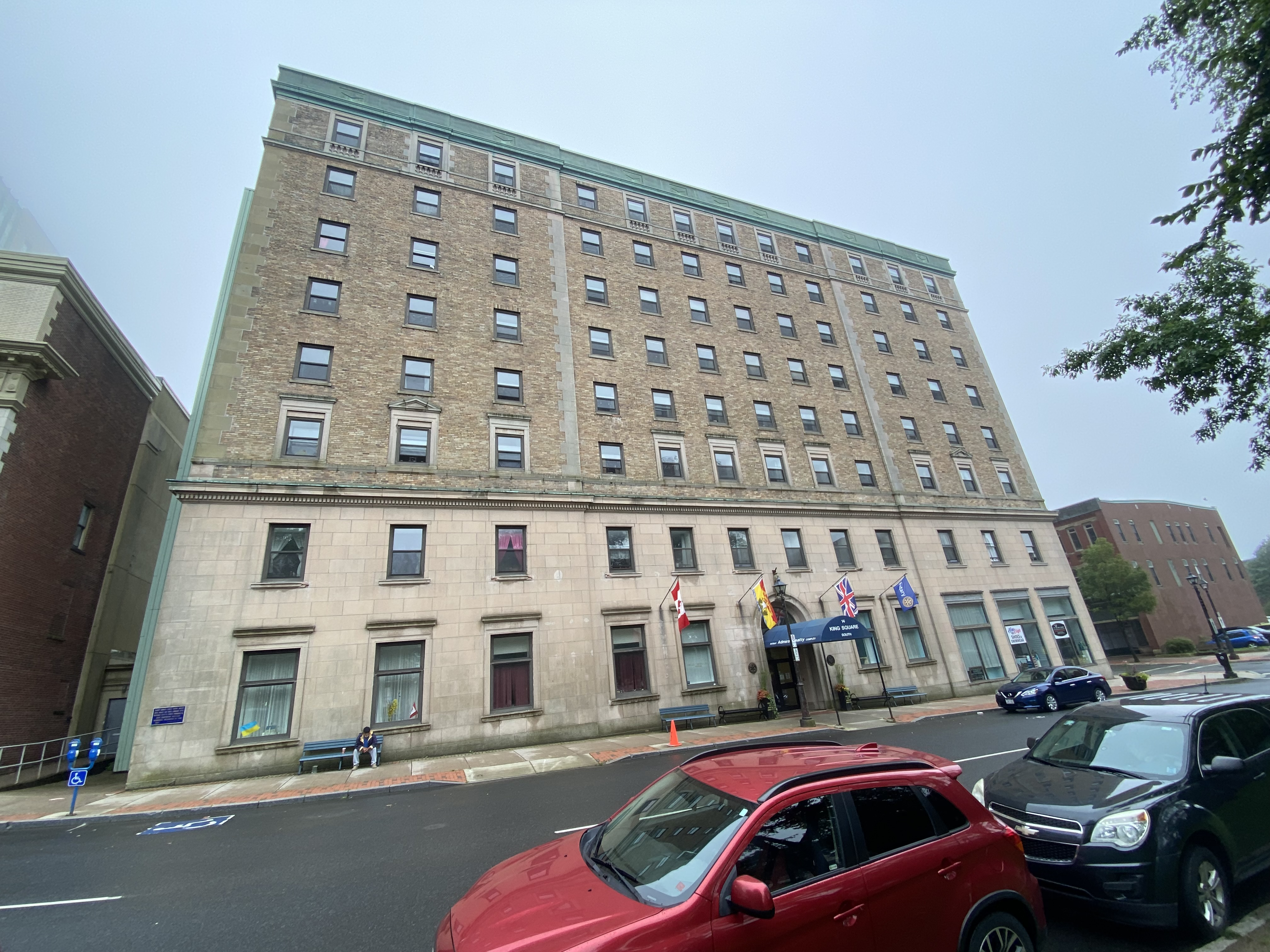
The Rotary Admiral Beatty Complex in 2023, as viewed from King's Square

The Admiral Beatty Hotel, now called the Rotary Admiral Beatty Complex, is a former luxury hotel located at King's Square in Saint John, New Brunswick, Canada. Built in 1925, the establishment was designed by Ross and Macdonald and featured eight stories. Following its permanent closure in 1982, the Admiral Beatty Hotel was converted into a senior citizen apartment building in 1986.

== Description ==
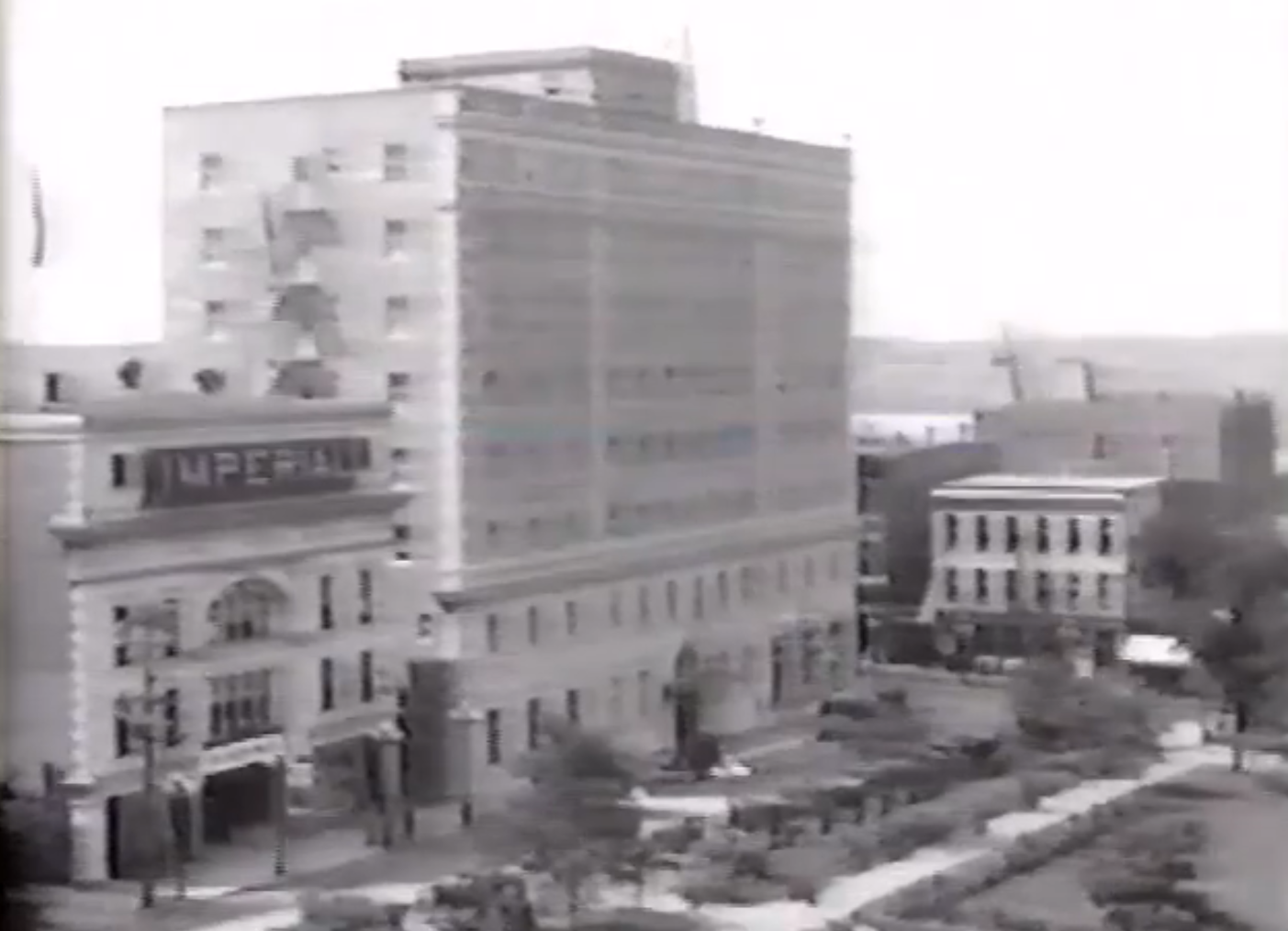
The Admiral Beatty Hotel in a 1925 tourism video, standing next to the Imperial Theatre

The Admiral Beatty Hotel stands at the intersection of King Square South and Charlotte Street, adjacent to the Imperial Theatre. According to a 1925 measurement, the building reaches a height of 148 feet (45 m). It features eight stories and, during its time as a hotel, 250 rooms. Designed by architectural firm Ross and Macdonald, the building has been described as Neoclassic, and it was built with stone and brick.

== History ==
=== Dufferin Hotel ===
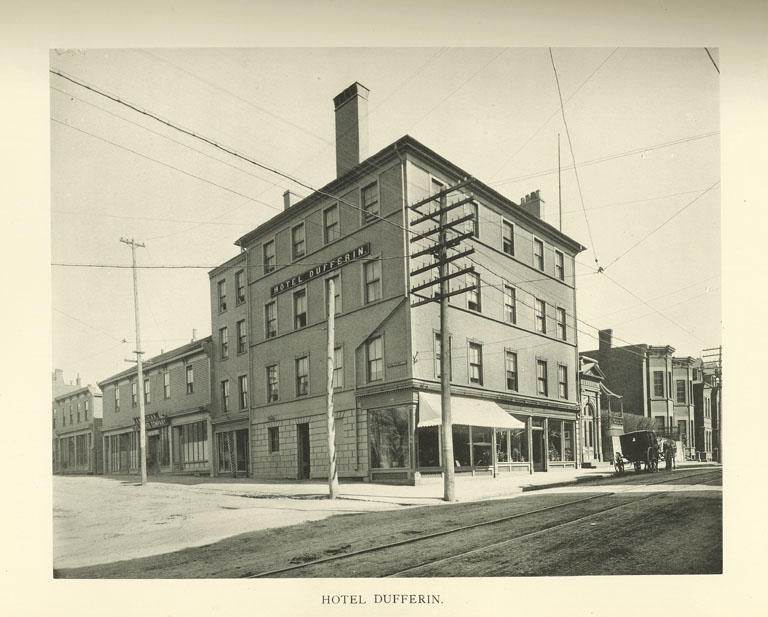
The Dufferin Hotel in 1899

Before the establishment of the Admiral Beatty Hotel, the site was occupied by the Dufferin Hotel, located at the very spot where the Admiral Beatty Hotel would eventually be constructed. It was named in honour of Frederick Hamilton-Temple-Blackwood, 1st Marquess of Dufferin and Ava, who served as the Governor General of Canada. The land on which the Dufferin Hotel was built had previously been the location of an old windmill, which, in 1807, while struggling financially as a mill, had been temporarily occupied by the Kings County Militia due to war between Great Britain and the United States. Subsequently, the mill was repurposed as a poorhouse and served in that capacity until it was destroyed by fire in 1817. The Dufferin was a hotel measuring four storeys, where it was demolished in 1924. Among those who stayed at the hotel included Harry Houdini. The Dufferin Hotel, which had been running for around 45 years at the time, publicly closed its doors on October 29, 1923. Demolition work for the Dufferin Hotel to make way for the Admiral Beatty Hotel started on January 22, 1924.

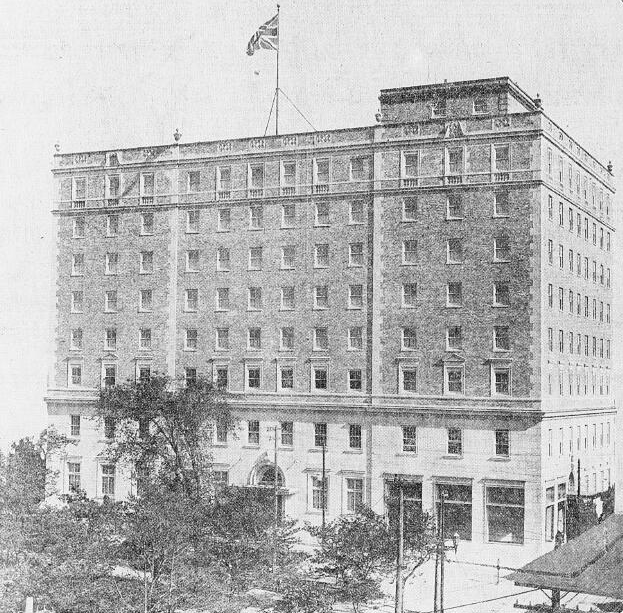
The Admiral Beatty Hotel in a 1930 newspaper excerpt

=== Establishment and use ===
The Admiral Beatty Hotel was initially planned for construction in 1923. Named in honor of Admiral of the Fleet David Beatty, Saint John saw the founding of the Admiral Beatty Hotel Company with $1.2 million in capital, with two-thirds coming from large corporations and the rest from hundreds of local donors. On July 28, 1924, the building's construction contract was signed, and the hotel's first ten guests were taken in on June 16, 1925. The hotel's opening ceremonies began on June 22, 1925. The following day, it opened its doors to over 400 Canadians at a banquet. Designed by Ross and Macdonald, the Admiral Beatty Hotel was operated by the United Hotels Company under a 30-year contract. The hotel initially featured 180 rooms, which was later upgraded to 240 in 1930 during a major renovation and expansion project, which granted the hotel the title of being the largest in the Maritimes. Upon opening, the Admiral Beatty Hotel featured amenities such as a lounge, a barber shop, a cafeteria, a main dining room, a regal suite for members of royalty or notable visitors, and a Georgian ballroom. The hotel was the operating location of multiple businesses, including CHSJ-FM, which had its inaugural broadcast from there on April 18, 1934. Following its opening, the Admiral Beatty Hotel was used to hold several meetings and events, including luncheons, conventions, as well as a meeting held by the Liberal Party in December 1925.

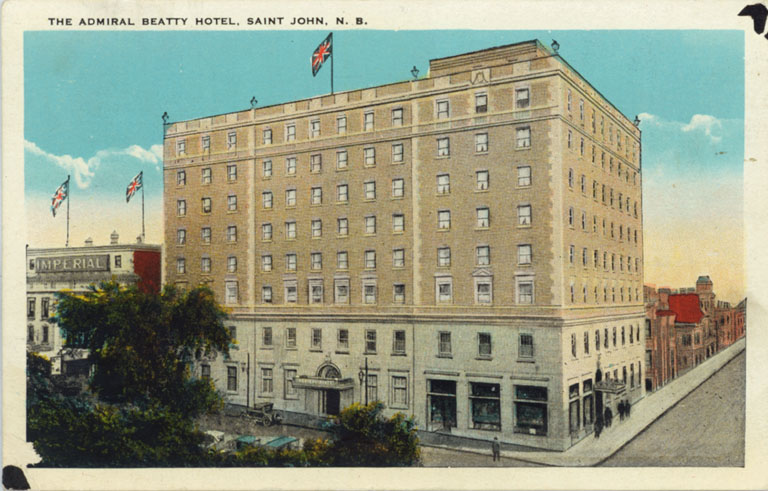
The Admiral Beatty Hotel in a c. 1930 postcard

The Admiral Beatty was also used to host several events including receptions and community events, as well as dances which were held in the hotel's ballroom. In 1926, the Canadian Chamber of Commerce's first convention took place at the Admiral Beatty Hotel.

Prior to the early 1950s, the Admiral Beatty Hotel restricted black people in Saint John from entering the hotel. While performing in Saint John, Black celebrities including Louis Armstrong and Ella Fitzgerald were even made to enter the hotel through the back door. This ban was held until Lena O'Ree, a hotel elevator worker, who was previously required to enter through the back, insisted on using the front entrance, pressuring the hotel into removing the policy. As a result, she is credited for breaking the hotel's colour barrier.

The Admiral Beatty Hotel started experiencing difficulties during the 1970s due to the city seeing newer hotel establishments. In May 1982, the Saint John Board of Trade was notified by the hotel that starting on May 28, 1982, the Board of Trade Dining Room will close down as a result of high operating costs, as well as costly food and beverages. In October 1982, the Admiral Beatty Hotel ceased operations.

=== Later usage as an apartment complex ===
The Admiral Beatty Hotel was proposed to be demolished to make way for a parking lot. In 1984, efforts were made to save the former hotel from destruction, such as through a $350,000 fundraiser led by the Rotary Club of Saint John, which played a large part in these efforts. Continued effort led to the proposition of the site being converted into apartments. On August 8, 1984, the Court of Queen's Bench granted permission for the former Admiral Beatty Hotel building to be sold. For the price of $550,000, the property was to be sold to a non-profit company to be named "Admiral Beatty Estates Ltd.", who planned to turn the former hotel into a 112-room senior-friendly apartment complex, with commercial offices on the ground floor. It had a projected cost of $6 million, and was set to complete on January 31, 1986. Following 1985's Christmas, the Admiral Beatty's first senior citizen tenants moved in. Following its re-opening as apartments, it was renamed to the Rotary Admiral Beatty Complex.

In 2021, the apartment complex's quality came into question, with a 69-year-old who lived there from 2013 to 2021 speaking out about the complex having mice chewing her belongings, as well as rain leaking in through the windows.

== Notable visitors ==
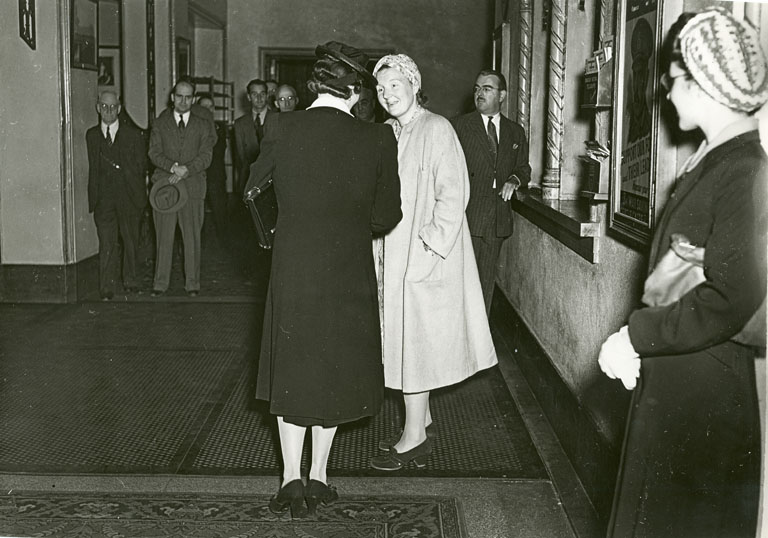
Princess Juliana of the Netherlands visiting the hotel

On May 20, 1932, the Admiral Beatty Hotel's dining room was visited by Amelia Earhart, who went there for breakfast. She stayed at the hotel the previous night after flying to Millidgeville that day. At the dining room, she met a Telegraph-Journal reporter who gave her a copy of the newspaper published that day, which featured her. Earhart took the copy on her plane, which flew to Ireland, making the copy, according to the Telegraph-Journal, "the first North American newspaper to arrive in Europe on its day of publication".

On November 6, 1951, Saint John was visited by a Royal motorcade, resulting in numerous people fainting. Members of the Canadian royal family, including Princess Elizabeth and the Duke of Edinburgh, entered the Admiral Beatty Hotel. The hotel was used to hold a reception, where Saint John mayor George E. Howard presented a gift to the royal couple on behalf of the City of Saint John. Police lines were held in front of the hotel, controlling the crowd that demanded to see Elizabeth, who would afterward look out of a window to wave at the crowd.

In 1964, American evangelist Billy Graham visited Saint John, during which he was interviewed at the Admiral Beatty Hotel.
