= Battle and theatre honours of the Royal Australian Air Force =

The Royal Australian Air Force and its forerunners have won many battle and theatre honours since their formation.

- Egypt (1915–17)
- Palestine (1917–18)
- Western Front (1917–18)
- Defence of Britain (1940–45)
- Atlantic (1939–45)
- Bismark
- English Channel and North Sea 1939–45
- Tripitz
- Baltic (1939–45)
- Fortress Europe (1940–44)
- France and Germany (1944–45)
- Biscay Ports (1940–45)
- Ruhr (1940–45)
- Berlin (1940–45)
- German Ports (1940–45)
- Normandy 1944
- Walcheren
- Rhine
- Biscay (1940–45)
- S.E. Europe (1942–45)
- Egypt and Libya (1940–43)
- El Alamein
- El Hamma
- North Africa (1942–43)
- Mediterranean (1940–43)
- Sicily 1943
- Italy (1943–45)
- Anzio and Nettuno
- Gustav Line
- Gothic Line
- Eastern Waters (1941–45)
- Arctic (1940–45)
- Russia (1941–45)
- Syria 1941
- Pacific (1941–45)
- Malaya (1941–42)
- Darwin (1941–44)
- Rabaul 1942
- Coral Sea
- New Guinea (1942–44)
- Moresby (1943–44)
- Milne Bay
- Bismark Sea
- New Britain 1943
- Markham Valley (1943–44)
- Dutch New Guinea 1944
- Morotai
- South China Sea (1944–45)
- Philippines (1944)
- Borneo 1945
- Malaya (1948–60)
- Thai-Malay (1960–66)
- Malaysia (Confrontation 1962–66)
- Ubon, Thailand (1962–66)
- East Timor (1999–2000)
- Iraq (2003)

== See also ==
- Royal Australian Air Force Memorial, Canberra
