= Korean War Veterans Memorial (Jersey City) =

Coordinates: 40°42′40″N 74°02′19″W

Korean Water Veterans Memorial
- Year: 2002
- Location: Hudson River Walkway; Jersey City, New Jersey

The Korean War Veterans Memorial in Jersey City, New Jersey is located on the Hudson River Waterfront Walkway in Paulus Hook in the Morris Canal section of Liberty State Park. It pays tribute to the Hudson County residents who died during the Korean War. Originally installed in 2002, it was renovated and completed 2015.

The memorial is based on the winning design of a competition initiated by the Stevens Institute of Technology’s Departments of Mechanical Engineering and Civil Engineering. It was crafted from imported Indian black granite. Within the center of the monument is a sculpture of two soldiers, an injured man being supported by a comrade, and three obelisks supporting flagstaffs inscribed with the 126 names of soldiers from Hudson County killed in the war. They are surrounded by two semi-circular walls with eighteen engraved depictions of the war.

The original project cost about $500,000 and was funded by donations by various groups and collection efforts by the Hudson County veterans, with about $300,000 from Jersey City corporations. The City of Jersey City donated about $70,000 and the City of Bayonne about $10,000. Local unions and contractors donated the rest in material and labor.

The memorial had been vandalized in 2014 but was restored and completed in 2015 with a funds donated by the city and a contribution of $100,000 from the city of Uijeongbu in Korea.

== See also ==
- List of public art in Jersey City, New Jersey
- List of Korean War memorials
- New Jersey Korean War Veterans Memorial
