= Korean War Memorial, Sydney =

Coordinates: 33.886844°S 151.218485°E

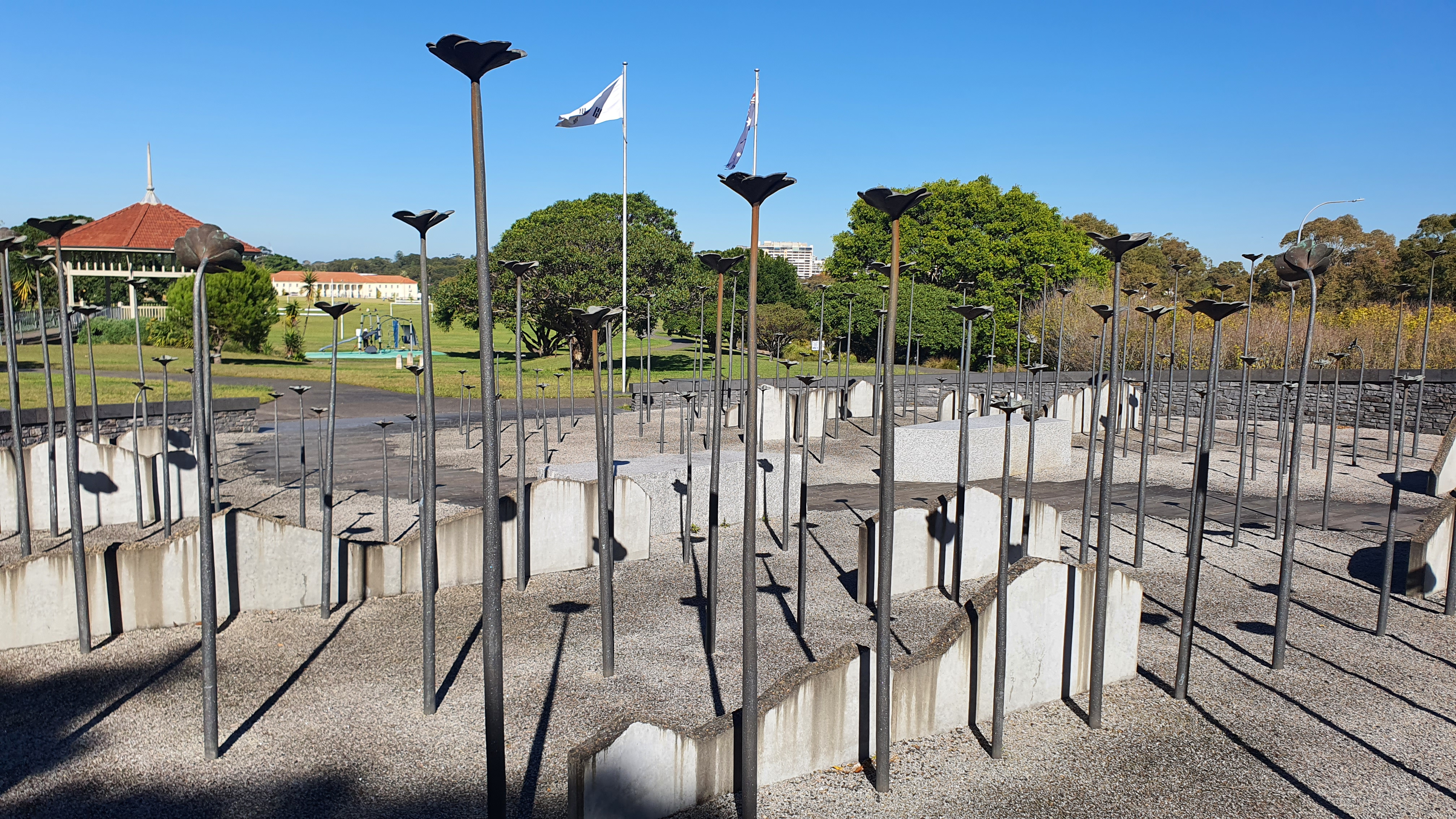

The Korean War Memorial is located in Moore Park, Sydney, New South Wales, Australia. It is a tribute to the 17,000 Australian troops who served in the United Nations contingent during the Korean War. It was dedicated in 2009. It was declared a Military Memorial of National Significance on 23 April 2013.

== History ==
The memorial is circular in plan, with a curving path through it forming the shape of the taegeuk, the symbol at the centre of the flag of South Korea. The pathway carries the names of the twenty-one countries of the UN task force. At the centre of the memorial are two granite stones quarried at the location of the Battle of Kapyong. They represent the divided Korean Peninsula. 136 steel and bronze flowers, based on the Rose of Sharon, the national flower of South Korea, represent the fallen troops from New South Wales. Eleven jagged pieces of concrete, depicting the rugged Korean landscape, carry the names of the battle in which Australians were awarded battle honours.
