= Administration Building Forecourt =

- Location within Cocos (Keeling) Islands
- 12.1884°S 96.8294°E
- Location: Morea Close, West Island, Cocos (Keeling) Islands, Australia

Commonwealth Heritage List
- Official name: Administration Building Forecourt
- Type: Listed place (Historic)
- Designated: 22 June 2004
- Reference no.: 105356

The Administration Building Forecourt is a heritage-listed garden and memorial precinct at Morea Close, West Island, Cocos (Keeling) Islands, Australia. It was added to the Australian Commonwealth Heritage List on 22 June 2004.

== Description ==
The formal front garden area to the Administration Building comprises a grassed square with a row of palms and includes an anchor and three memorials enclosed with white concrete bollards, a white chain and flagpole. The group of memorials depict various events associated with the history and strategic location of the islands: the anchor is from the Port Refuge, salvaged 1981; one plaque commemorates the action between the Sydney and the Emden in the Battle of Cocos, another commemorates Flying Officer Tom Henniken, 10 Squadron RAAF, aboard Orion A9-754, ditched 25/4/91. The plaque was unveiled by survivors in 1992. Another plaque, unveiled 1994, commemorates R Mech. P Challinor, Royal Navy, killed 1944 in a Japanese air attack, and buried nearby.

The forecourt provides a symbolic location for ceremonial events such as ANZAC Day.

In 2000 the condition was assessed as good.

== Heritage listing ==
The Administration Building Forecourt, including an anchor and three World War Two memorials has social and community significance for the people of the Cocos (Keeling) Islands as the symbolic location and focus of ceremonial events such as ANZAC Day.
