= King's Square, Saint John =

Urban park in Canada

King’s Square
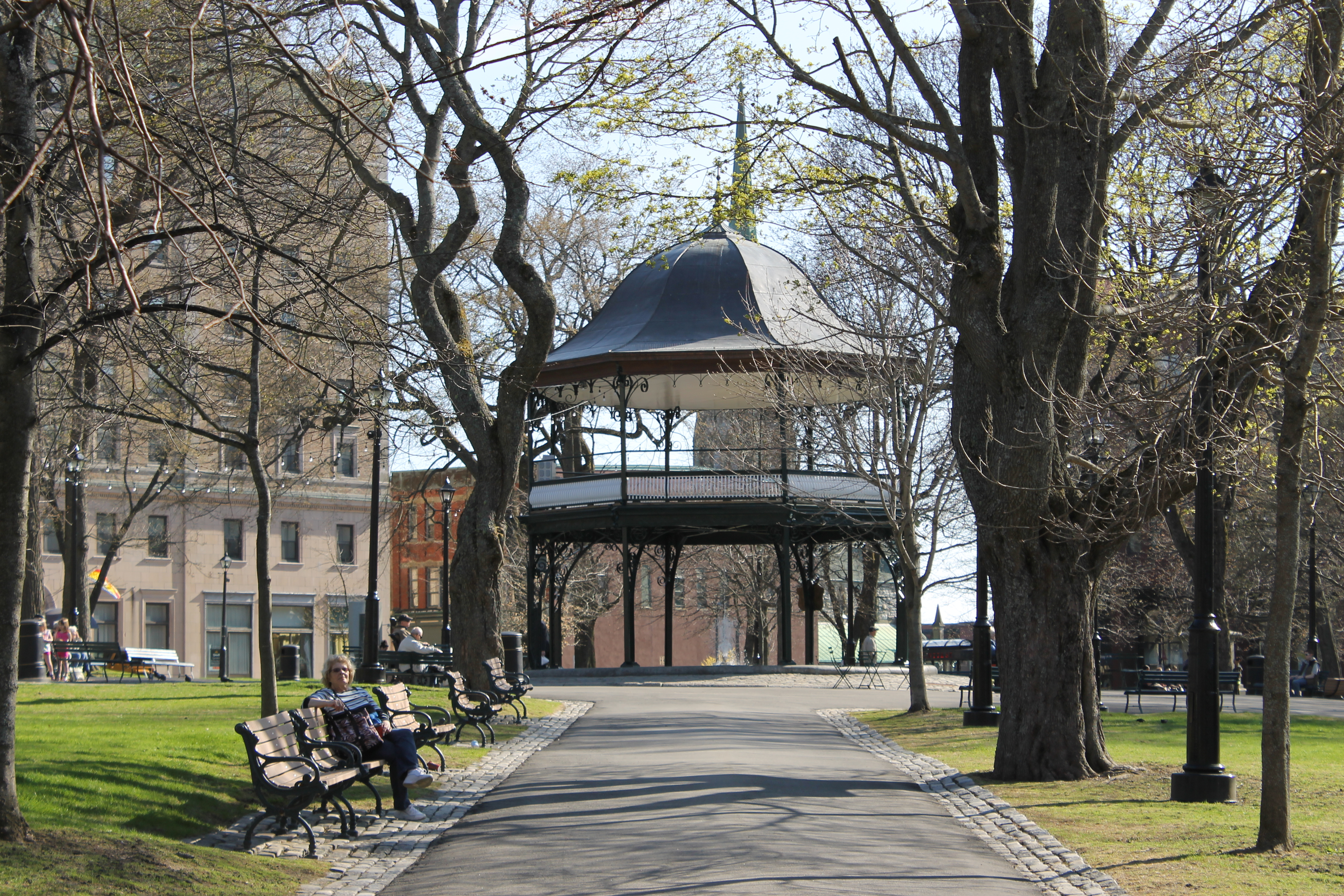
- The park in 2014
- Interactive map of King’s Square
- Type: Urban park
- Location: Saint John, New Brunswick, Canada
- Coordinates: 45°16′25″N 66°3′29″W
- Created: 1785

King's Square is a historic urban park located in Uptown Saint John, New Brunswick, Canada. The grounds of the square itself was established in 1785 when the city was granted it by charter, though it was not until 1844 when King's Square became a park. It was named after King George III. The square features multiple monuments and plaques paying tribute to individuals who have contributed to the city’s heritage. It also has several tall trees, most of which were planted during the 1883 Centennial Celebrations onto commemorate the arrival of the Loyalists in the city. At the center of the park stands a two-storey bandstand, donated in 1909 by the City Coronet Band, in honour of King Edward VII.

== Features ==
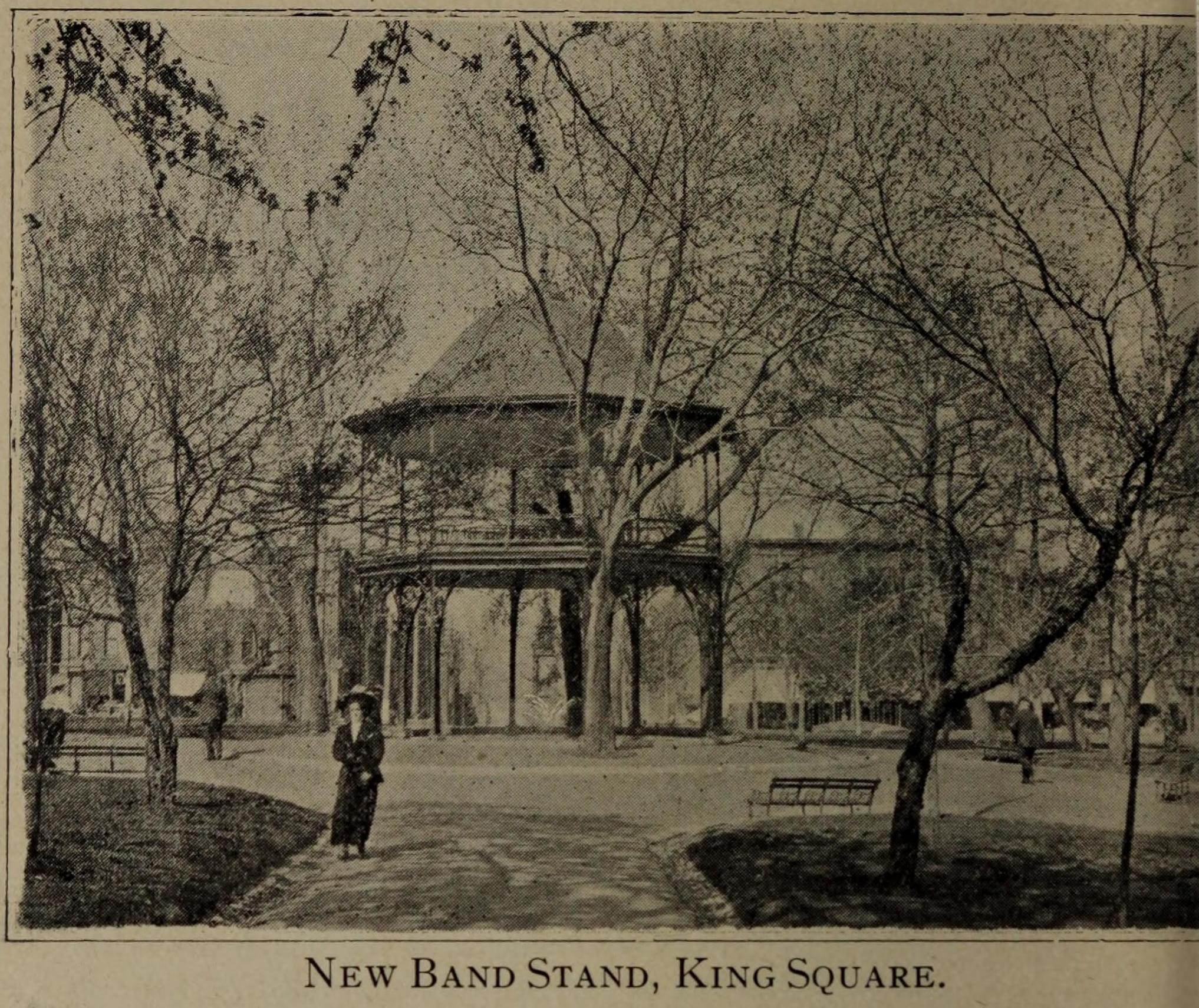
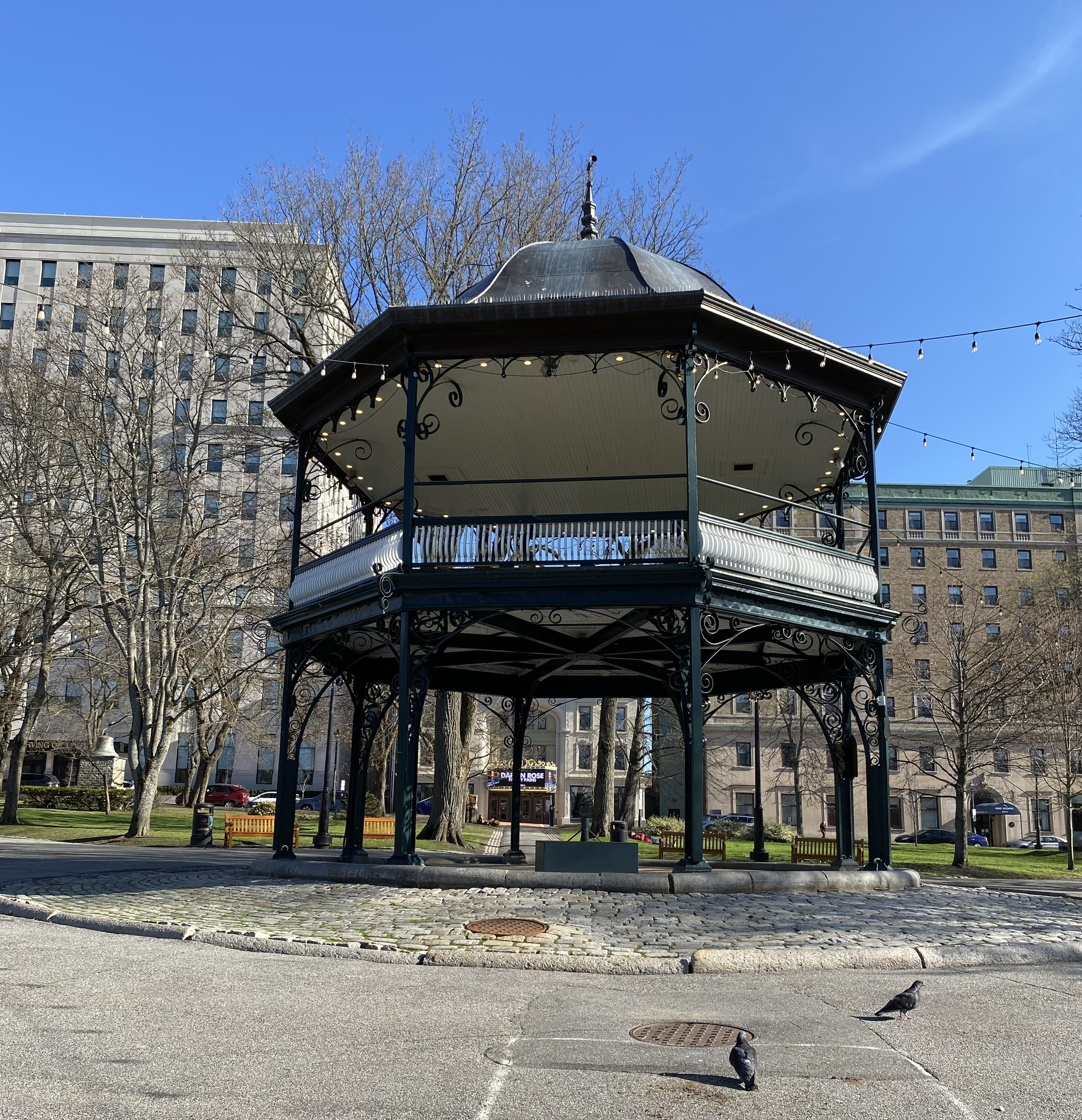
The King Edward VII Memorial Bandstand in 1910 (top) and in 2023 (bottom)

At the center of the park stands the King Edward VII Memorial Bandstand, a two-storey tall bandstand equipped with a copper roof and metal framework. It was constructed in 1908 and donated to the city in 1909 by the City Conet Band.

Adjacent to the park sits buildings such as the Saint John City Market, the Imperial Theatre, as well as the Admiral Beatty Hotel.

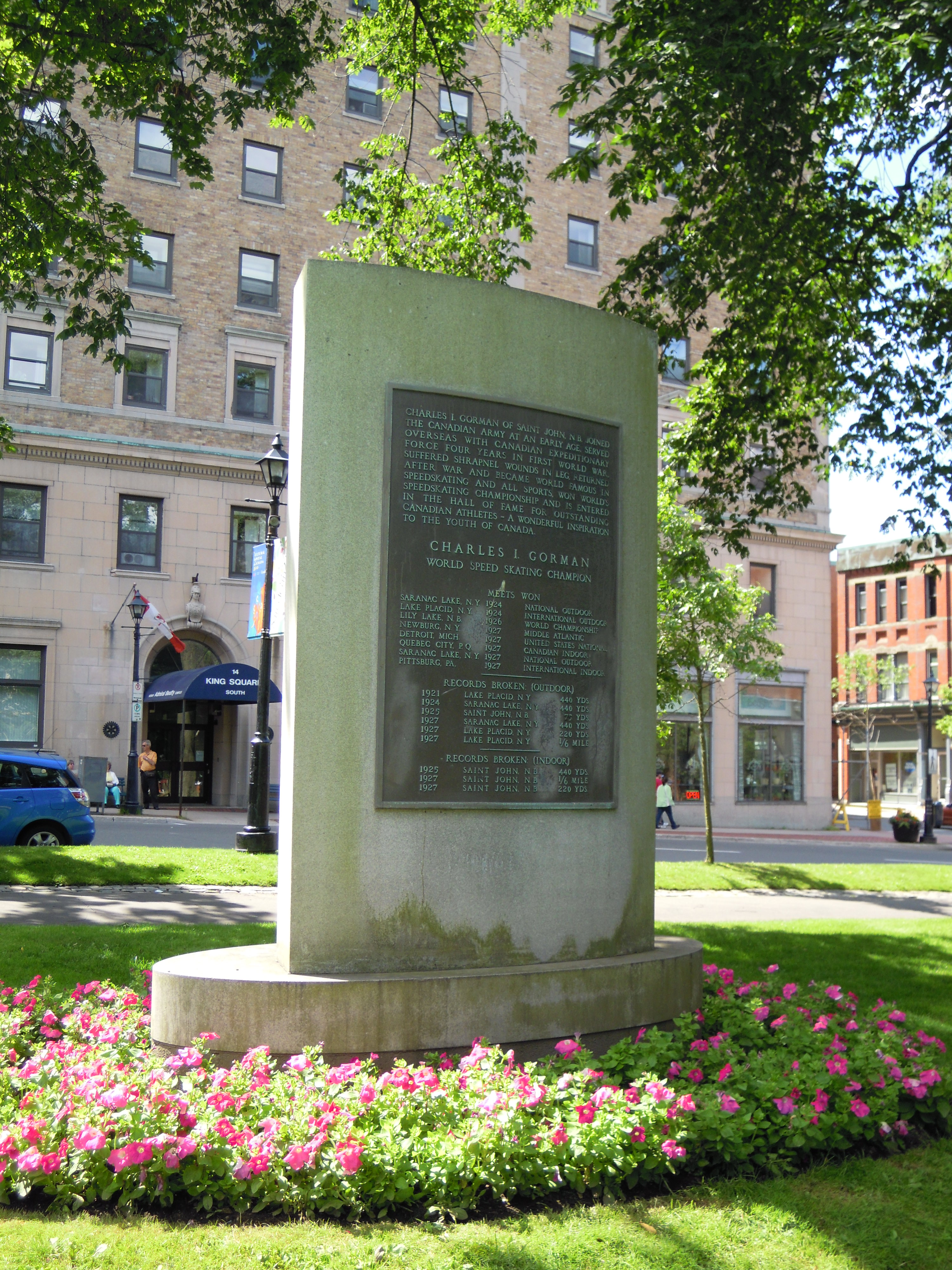
Monument to Charles Gorman

The park holds several monuments, including a marker honouring Charles Gorman, a local speed skater who competed in the 1924 and 1928 Winter Olympics. The east side of the park holds a 20’ tall monument for John Frederick Young, a 19-year-old who, on October 30, 1890, drowned while trying to rescue a 10-year-old boy in nearby waters. Another monument located at the park is “The Loyalist Cross”, a cross monument in honour of the first sellers representing the province. Constructed in 1934, it was unveiled on New Brunswick’s 150th anniversary.

== History ==
King's Square was established in 1785, being named for the reigning monarch, King George III. It was one of the four squares originally included in the town plan. In 1847, the park's site was cleared and laid out using a Union Jack flag pattern.

In 2019, Hurricane Dorian hit the city, causing damage to the park. In total, five of the nearly 200-year-old trees in the park fell to the ground. On September 15, 2021, seven new maple trees were planted to replace the fallen trees.

== See also ==
- Saint John War Memorial
