= Korean War Memorial (Salem, Oregon) =

War memorial in Salem, Oregon, U.S.

- United States
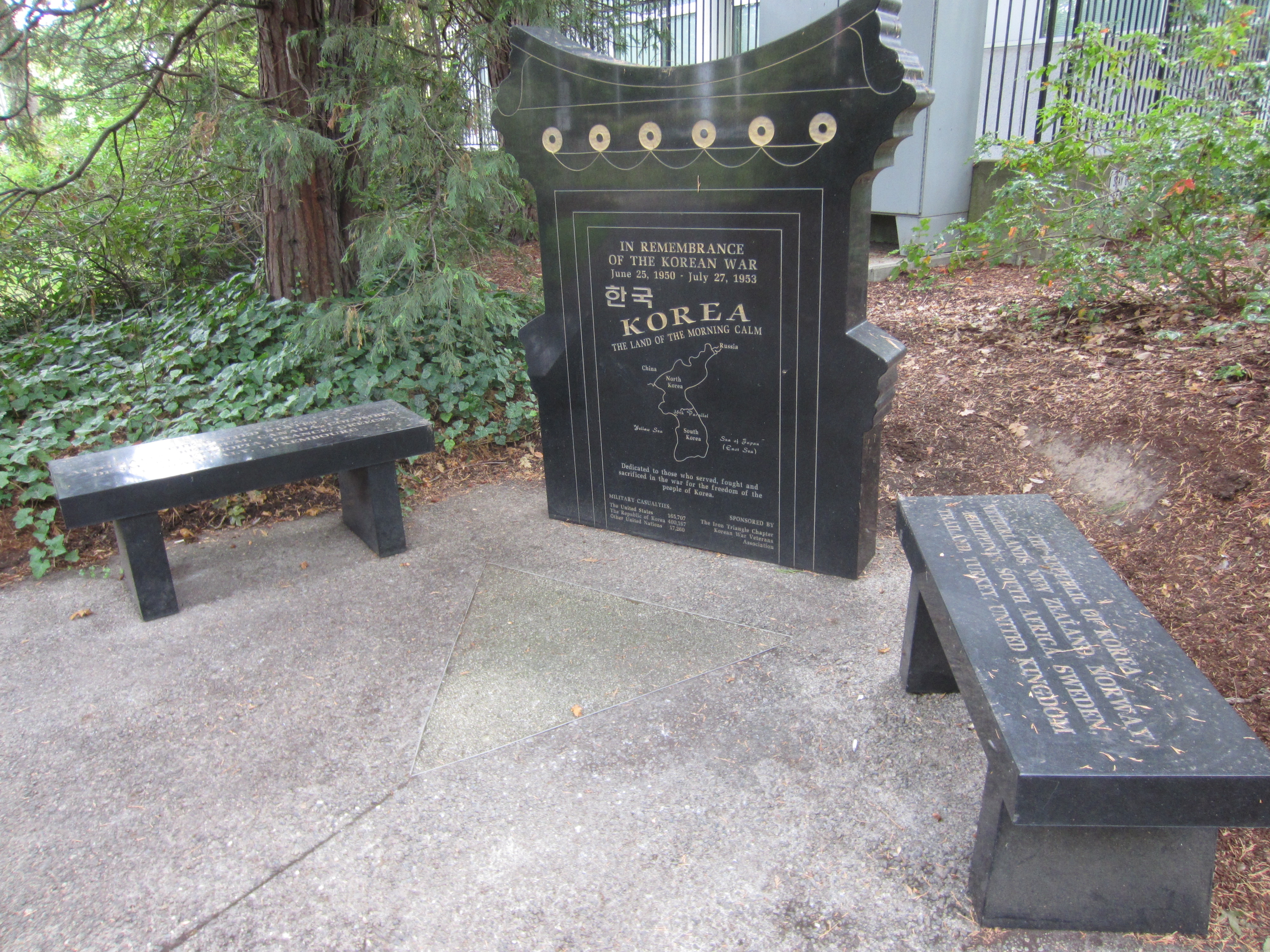
- The monument in 2018
- For Those who fought in the Korean War
- Location: 44.945000°N 123.026850°W; Veterans Building near Salem, Oregon

The Korean War Memorial is a monument commemorating those who fought in the Korean War, installed outside the Veterans Building in Salem, Oregon, United States, which houses the offices of the Oregon Department of Veterans' Affairs.

== See also ==
- List of Korean War memorials
