= New Jersey Korean War Veterans Memorial =

Memorial in Atlantic City, New Jersey

The New Jersey Korean War Veterans Memorial is a Korean War veterans memorial located at Park Place in Atlantic City, New Jersey. Its goal is to "ensure that future generations remember and honor the pride and dedication of those who served, the legacy they continued, and the freedom they preserved".

== History ==
In 1996, State Senator Louis F. Kosco established the New Jersey Korean War Veterans Memorial Committee with legislation that enabled appropriate funding for the memorial with a $25,000 seed fund. The memorial was estimated to cost $3 million. Atlantic City's Casino Reinvestment Development Authority (CRDA) contributed $1 million toward the project.

In 2000, Governor Christine Todd Whitman and other dignitaries joined approximately 1,000 other attendees to pay tribute to the 191,000 New Jerseyans who served in the war. She stated, "May this memorial forever stand both as a tribute to those who fought for freedom in Korea and as an enduring symbol of New Jerseyans' deep appreciation for the selfless, patriotic service of all our country's veterans". Also in attendance was Major General Paul J. Glazar who said, "With this very beautiful and special permanent tribute, the veterans of the Forgotten War will be forgotten no more."

== See also ==
- Korean War Veterans Memorial (Jersey City)
- List of Korean War memorials
