= Korean War Veterans Memorial (Austin, Texas) =

War memorial in Austin, Texas, U.S.

- The monument in 2018
- Interactive map of Korean War Veterans Memorial
- Location: Austin, Texas, United States
- Coordinates: 30.27645°N 97.74069°W

The Korean War Veterans Memorial is an outdoor monument by Edward L. Hankey commemorating the more than 289,000 Texans who served in the Korean War, installed on the Texas State Capitol grounds, in Austin, Texas, United States. The memorial was erected in 1999 by the Texas Lone Star Chapter of the Korean War Veterans Association. It features a star-shaped Texas Sunset Red Granite pedestal topped with a bronze sculpture of an eagle.

== See also ==
- 1999 in art
- List of Korean War memorials
