= Saint John War Memorial =

War memorial in Saint John, New Brunswick, Canada

Saint John War Monument
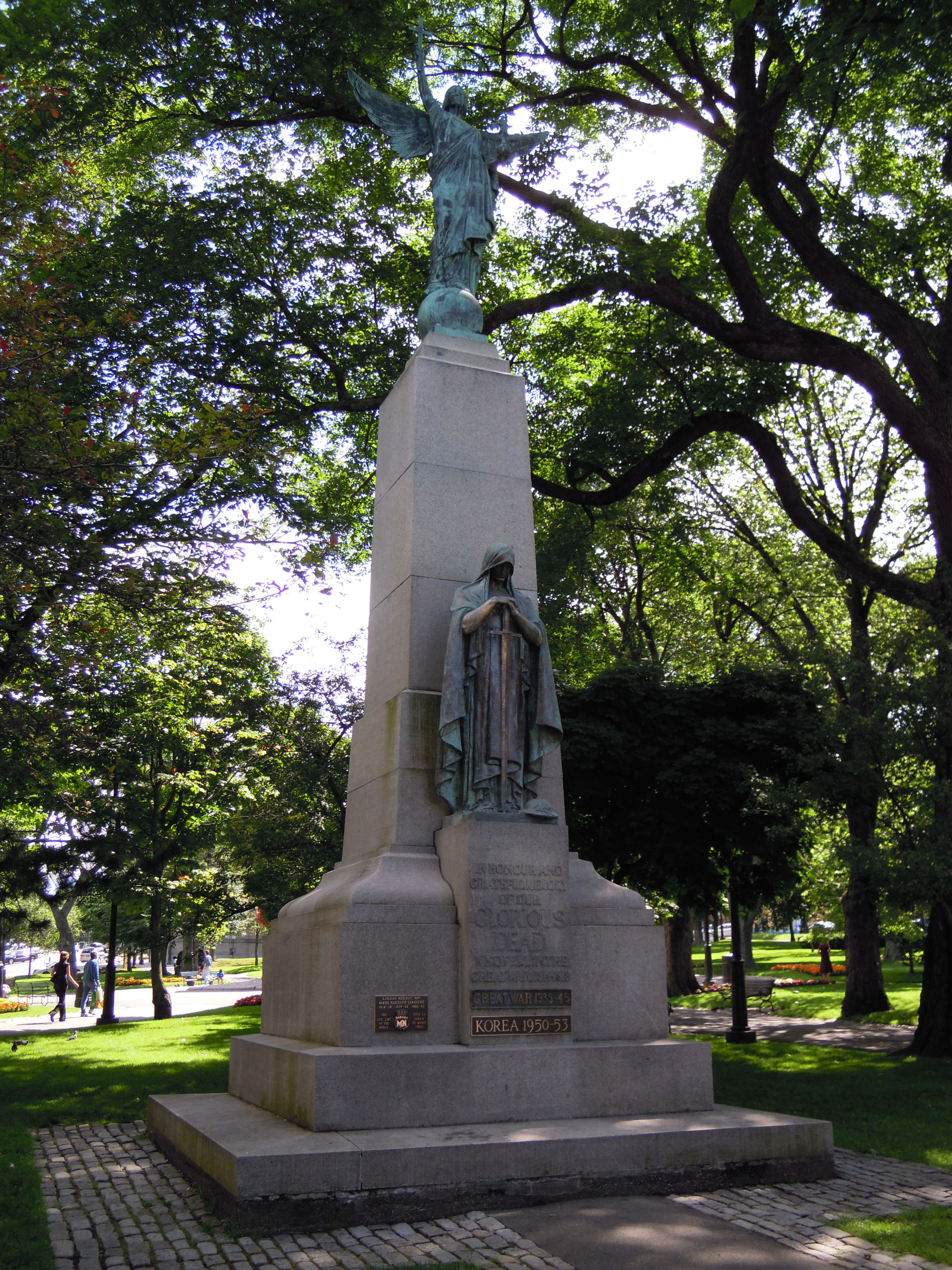
- The monument in 2010
- Interactive map of Saint John War Monument
- Location: King's Square, Saint John, New Brunswick, Canada
- Coordinates: 45°16′9″N 66°3′25″W
- Designer: Alfred Howell
- Completion date: 1925
- Dedicated date: June 10, 1925
- Dedicated to: Saint John's war dead

The Saint John War Memorial is a monument located in King's Square in Saint John, New Brunswick, Canada. It was designed by Toronto-based sculptor Alfred Howell and was dedicated in 1925 in honor of Saint John's war dead from World War I. Later additions to the monument honored war dead from World War II, the Korean War, and the War in Afghanistan.

== Description ==
The monument is located at 75 Charlotte Street in Saint John, New Brunswick, Canada. It consists of two figures. On top is a winged personification of victory, which stands atop a globe and holds a cross and a flag in its hands. Below this is a figure of a mourning figure that has its hands resting on a sword, with a soldier's helmet and a bunch of laurel leaves at its feet. The following is inscribed on the structure:

IN HONOUR AND / GRATEFUL MEMORY / OF OUR / GLORIOUS / DEAD / WHO FELL IN THE / GREAT WAR 1914-1918 / GREAT WAR 1939-45 / KOREA 1950-53 / AFGHANISTAN 2001-2014

CANADIAN MERCHANT NAVY / MARINE MARCHANDE CANADIENNE / 1914-18 1939-45 1950-53 / THE / LIFE LINE / OF THE / WORLD / POUR LA / SURVIE / DU MONDE / LIBRE

== History ==
=== Creation and dedication ===
Following the end of World War I, many municipalities across Canada began to erect war memorials to honor their community's war dead. Many of these memorials were the work of local civic groups consisting of women, including local chapters of the Imperial Order Daughters of the Empire (IODE). On May 18, 1922, local IODE chapter of Saint John, New Brunswick, held a meeting to discuss the possibility of erecting a memorial in their city, which was supported by the Great War Veterans Association. Reporting on the meeting the following day, Saint John's Globe newspaper noted that there had been several ideas put forward regarding the memorial's design (including a cenotaph, flagpole, and memorial arch) and location, with King's Square being discussed. The meeting concluded with an eight-member monument committee being formed. As was common with many monument committees at the time, records were not maintained by the group, but local newspapers widely reported on their activities.

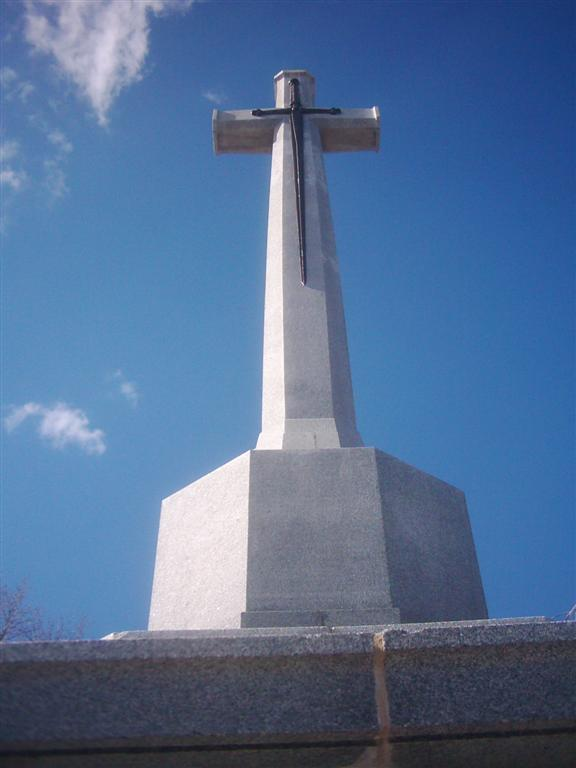
Early design considerations included a Cross of Sacrifice (Halifax, Nova Scotia, example, pictured 2013).

On May 23, the committee met with several organizations that had been involved in work for the war to request their input for the memorial's design. The committee met again in mid-June, where they voted to select King's Square as the site for the monument and to form a subcommittee to select a design and specific location in the square. By August, former Saint John Mayor Robert T. Hayes had been appointed the committee's chairman and appeared before the Saint John Common Council to solicit support. During this meeting, politician Frank L. Potts recommended that the memorial be in the form of a civic centre, though Hayes denied the request. In September, a member of the Canadian branch of the Imperial War Graves Commission visited Saint John and recommended that the memorial take the form of the Cross of Sacrifice, designed by Reginald Blomfield. At the end of the month, the committee met again and voted to allocate $500 (equivalent to $8,900 in 2025) to solicit more designs. While the idea of a memorial arch remained popular with the public, the committee rejected the idea as too expensive and favored either a Cross of Sacrifice or a column with several bronze statues. Around the same time, the city government agreed to allow the memorial to be erected in King's Square.

On December 19, the Globe reported that the committee had selected a design for the memorial submitted by Toronto-based sculptor Alfred Howell. As a reward, Howell was paid $300 ($5,400 in 2025) by the committee. By the end of 1922, several subcommittees had been formed to oversee the memorial's financing, construction, and permitting. The committee set about raising funds for the project, which was projected to cost $20,000 ($357,000 in 2025). However, fundraising proceeded slowly, with the Globe reporting on May 31, 1924, that the committee had not yet raised enough money for the monument's creation.

==== Location controversy ====
Concerning the monument's location, the committee wanted to secure permission from the city government to place the monument at the head of King's Street in King's Square. This would require the relocation of a fountain which had been erected in the 1880s by the Woman's Christian Temperance Union (WCTU) in recognition of the United Empire Loyalist settlers of the city. On June 17, 1924, a letter requesting this from the memorial committee was read at a meeting of the Saint John Common Council, with several members voicing their opposition to the proposal. At a July 2 council meeting, Hayes reiterated the committee's desire for the fountain's removal, though the council was divided on the matter and took no immediate action. In August, the committee reported to the city council that they would erect the monument in a triangular patch of grass near the fountain.

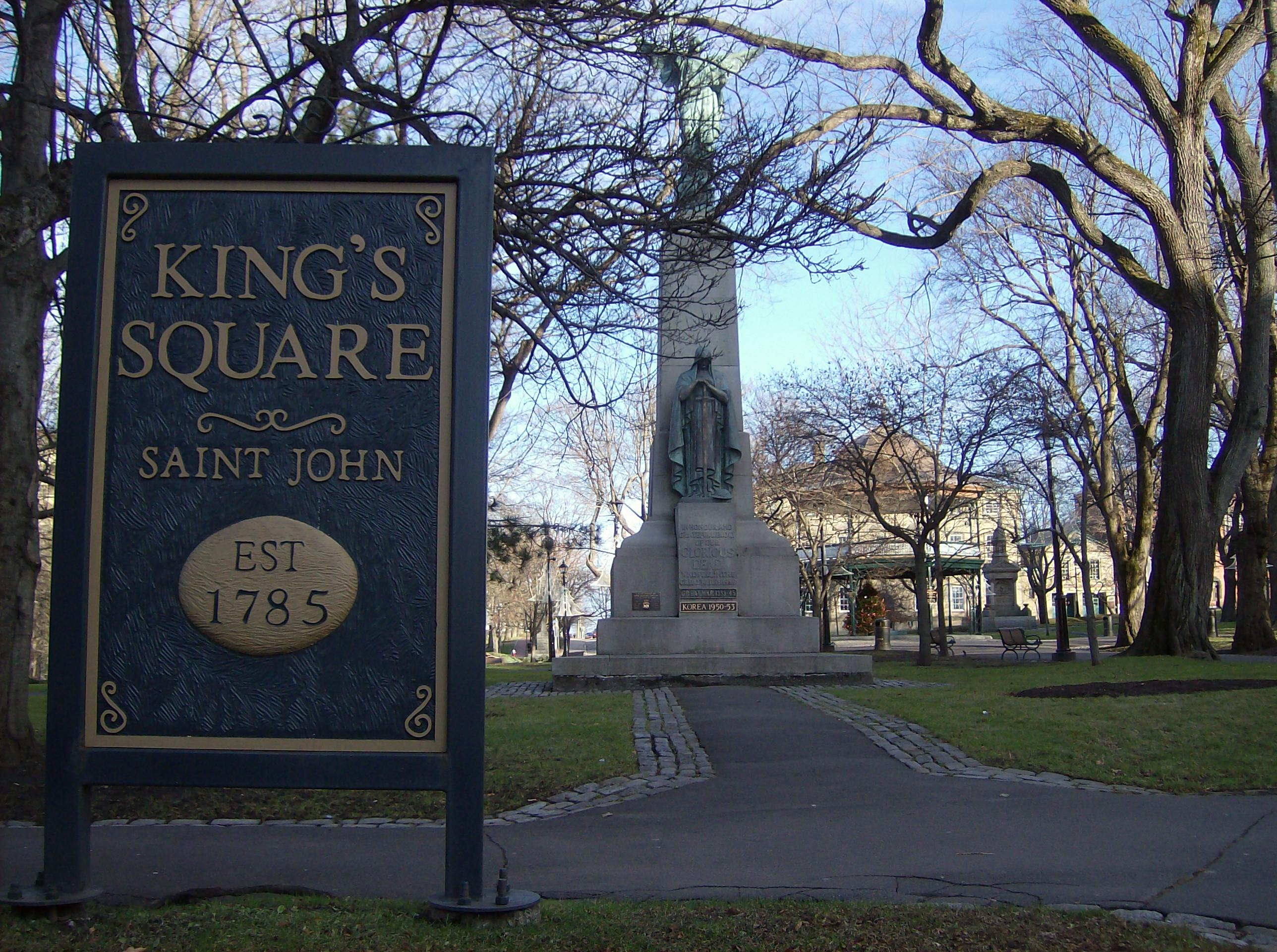
The monument's location in King's Square (pictured 2013) was the subject of controversy during its planning.

On March 17, 1925, the committee said that they still had to raise approximately $2,000 ($36,100 in 2025) and that they planned to unveil the monument in either May or June of that year. Around this same time, public support for the monument's location at the head of King's Street began to increase, with an article published by the Globe on March 27 urging a public meeting to push for the location. At the meeting, several civic groups, including the local chapter of Rotary International, voiced their support for the fountain's removal. Over the next several weeks, the Globe received numerous letters advocating in support of the location at the head of King's Street. However, city council members who remained opposed to the fountain's relocation remained adamant and cited ownership concerns regarding the local and provincial WCTU branches concerning the fountain.

On May 1, the committee voted to reach out to the city council and inform them that if the fountain was not removed to make way for the monument, then they would keep the monument in storage for a year and petition them again. However, the city council did not respond. Two weeks later, the committee held a meeting and decided that the monument would be erected in another part of the square, keeping the fountain in place. Additionally, the committee set a tentative dedication date of between June 10 and 15 and decided to invite Major General A. H. Macdonnell of the 5th Infantry Brigade and The Reverend Canon Gordon Lawrence (rector of Saint John's Trinity Anglican Church) to participate in the ceremony.

=== Dedication and later history ===
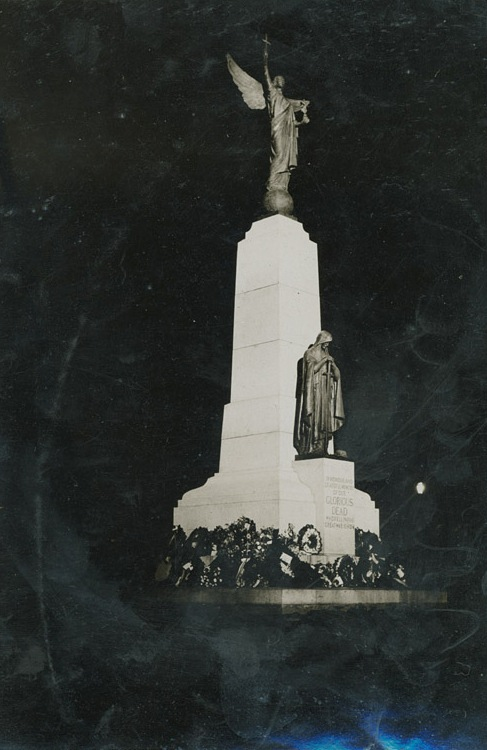
The monument in June 1925

The monument was dedicated on June 10, 1925, in a ceremony that began at 7 p.m. By that time, the monument had been in place for several days. For the event, which was attended by several thousand spectators, the lower statue was covered with a Union Jack. Macdonnell performed the monument's unveiling and gave a speech, which was followed by another speech by Hayes. During this later speech, Hayes noted that the committee still owed $2,800 ($50,500 in 2025) and asked the city council to assist them. For music, a band played "O Canada", a choir sang "Abide with Me", and several musicians performed "Last Post" and "Reveille". Lawrence then gave a dedicatory prayer and a short speech before Potts (who by this time had become mayor) spoke. The ceremony concluded with a performance of "God Save the King". On June 24, the monument was officially handed over to the city government for care.

Over the next several decades, the monument served as a focal point for Remembrance Day ceremonies in the city. Information on later Canadian conflicts was added to the monument, which included World War II, the Korean War, and the War in Afghanistan. Meanwhile, the WCTU fell into disrepair and was ultimately demolished in 1962. In June 2026, several plaques on the monument were removed in an act of vandalism, with other monuments in the area targeted as well.

== See also ==
- Canadian war memorials
- List of Korean War memorials
- List of World War I monuments and memorials

== Sources ==
- Littlewood, Thomas M. (Fall 2018). "Conflicting Commemotations: The Saint John war memorial and the Women's Christian Temperance Union fountain, 1922–1925". Journal of New Brunswick Studies. 10. Fredericton: UNB Libraries Centre for Digital Scholarship: 39–58. ISSN 2369-6591. OCLC 681584848.
