= Type T Houses Precinct =

- Location within Cocos (Keeling) Islands
- Location on the Cocos (Keeling) Islands

General information
- Status: Completed
- Type: Houses for government employees
- Location: William Keeling Crescent, West Island, Cocos (Keeling) Islands, Australia
- Coordinates: 12.1912°S 96.8310°E
- Completed: c. 1950s
- Renovated: 1979
- Client: Australian Government

Technical details
- Material: Cement asbestos

Commonwealth Heritage List
- Official name: Type T Houses Precinct
- Type: Listed place (Historic)
- Designated: 22 June 2004
- Reference no.: 105408

The Type T Houses Precinct is a heritage-listed residential area at William Keeling Crescent and Qantas Close, West Island Settlement, Cocos (Keeling) Islands, Australia. It was added to the Australian Commonwealth Heritage List on 22 June 2004.

== History ==
The "Type T" houses were built during the 1950s as part of the establishment of housing for Australian Government employees administering the Cocos (Keeling) Islands. The houses were built as part of the West Island housing settlement. Structural upgrades were completed in 1979.

== Description ==
The houses are located generally on the western side of the West Island residential area. Twenty houses were originally built and all still remain.

The elevated asbestos cement clad houses have a plan form and design suited to local climatic conditions. The houses have three bedrooms, kitchen, bathroom and living room and a front porch. The design of the houses is in the shape of a "T" - hence giving the name of Type T Houses.

In 2000 the houses were assessed as being in good condition. They were undergoing new paint to the exterior - a change from the asbestos cement sheeting.

== Heritage listing ==
The Type "T" Houses Precinct is significant for its association with the establishment of housing for Australian Government employees administering the Cocos (Keeling) Islands. The presence of the Australian Government assisted the self determination of the Cocos Malay people. The houses are significant in the development of the West Island settlement, which grew after Government House was located on West Island in 1953.

The Type "T" Houses Precinct is significant as an example of Australian Government housing on the Cocos (Keeling) Islands with a plan form and design suited to local climatic conditions. The houses are important as the predominant early housing type provided for Australian personnel.
