= Qantas Huts =

- Location within Cocos (Keeling) Islands
- Location in the Cocos (Keeling) Islands

General information
- Status: Completed
- Type: Houses for Qantas Empire Airways passengers
- Location: Sydney Highway, West Island, Cocos (Keeling) Islands, Australia
- Coordinates: 12.1888°S 96.8290°E
- Completed: c. 1960s
- Client: Qantas Empire Airways

Technical details
- Material: Cement asbestos; timber

Commonwealth Heritage List
- Official name: Qantas Huts (former)
- Type: Listed place (Historic)
- Designated: 22 June 2004
- Reference no.: 105354

The Qantas Huts are heritage-listed former accommodation huts at Sydney Highway, West Island, Cocos (Keeling) Islands, an external territory of Australia. They were added to the Australian Commonwealth Heritage List on 22 June 2004.

== History ==
By 1951, the Australian Government assumed control of the Cocos (Keeling) Islands and in the same year, amid disputes with the Clunies-Ross family over the management of the Islands, the family sold 150 hectares (370 acres) to the Australian Government for the construction of an airfield.

During World War II air travel between Australia and Asia was difficult because there were few planes which could fly between Australia and East Africa or Ceylon without stopping for fuel. In 1939, Captain Taylor demonstrated that Catalina flying boats were able to cross the Indian Ocean as long as there were stops for refuelling. During World War II the Royal Air Force squadron was formed in Ceylon. They made 824 secret journeys between the Indian Ocean and Perth, transporting personnel, official mail and patrolling the Ocean, with a non-stop flying time of 28 hours. These planes refuelled at the Cocos (Keeling) Islands when they had larger pay loads.

In the 1940s, Qantas Empire Airways maintained five Catalinas and flew to the Cocos (Keeling) Islands infrequently. The airstrip was upgraded after 1952 with capacity for the landing and take-off of Qantas Constellations and Stratocruisers. Qantas and later the South African Airways used the Islands as a transit stop between Perth and Johannesburg, South Africa.

The Cocos (Keeling) Islands became an Australian external territory in 1955. During the 1960s Indonesia declared its airspace "out of bounds" and thousands of aircraft passengers on route from Australia to South Africa stayed on West Island. The Qantas Huts provided passengers with accommodation while the larger aeroplanes were refuelled overnight.

== Description ==
The Qantas Huts are located on Sydney Highway near the intersection with Clunies Ross Avenue in the West Island Settlement.

They consist of two asbestos cement clad accommodation buildings which are timber framed and elevated on concrete stumps with verandahs to the north. These comprise six rooms within each block.

In 1996 the buildings were considered to be in fair condition.

In 2000 it was noted that a verandah had been added as well as solid double doors. The double doors are timber and are considered to be inappropriate to the style of the house.

== Heritage listing ==
The Former Qantas Huts are significant as evidence of the era in Australian aviation history where aeroplane services between Perth and Johannesburg, South Africa, required a refuelling stop at the Cocos (Keeling) Islands because of the long flying time over the Indian Ocean. Accommodation was provided for passengers in the form of huts. The Former Qantas Huts are also associated with the period in the 1960s when the Indonesian Government declared its airspace "out of bounds" to the Australian aviation industry, forcing Australian commercial and military aircraft to refuel at the Cocos (Keeling) Islands on the route to South Africa.

The Former Qantas Huts are rare examples of short term accommodation provided for travellers during aircraft refuelling on international flights over the Indian Ocean in the 1960s.
