= Royal Australian Air Force Memorial =

Coordinates: 35.287°S 149.144°E

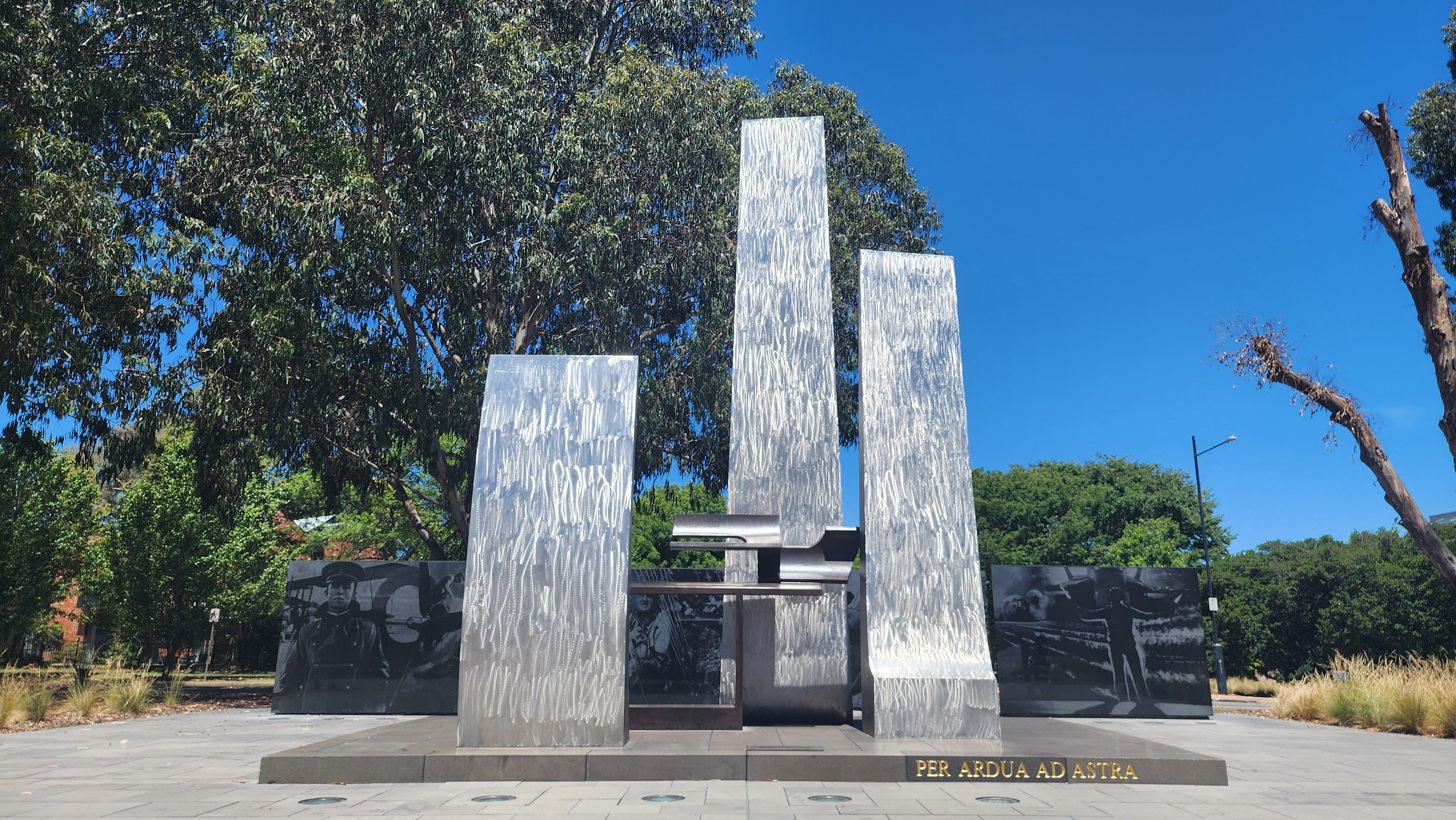
RAAF Memorial, highlighting the three stone walls with etched photographs.

The Royal Australian Air Force Memorial is on Anzac Parade, the principal ceremonial and memorial avenue of Canberra, the capital city of Australia.

The Royal Australian Air Force was formed on 31 March 1921, being preceded by the Australian Flying Corps that saw service in World War I. This memorial commemorates the 50th anniversary of the formation of the RAAF (initially as the Australian Air Force, the "Royal" prefix being added in August 1921), and the service of members of the RAAF. It was unveiled by Prince Philip, Duke of Edinburgh on 15 March 1973.

The redeveloped memorial incorporated three black granite walls and their images. It was dedicated in the presence of Peter Hollingworth AC OBE, Governor General of the Commonwealth of Australia; John Howard, Prime Minister of Australia; and Air Marshal Angus Houston AC AFC, Chief of Air Force.

== Sculpture ==
The central sculpture was designed by Inge King to commemorate the 50th anniversary of the formation of the RAAF, and was unveiled in 1973. It symbolises the aspirations and achievements of the RAAF; the three upturned wing shapes representing the endurance, strength and courage of RAAF people, while the bronze flight sculpture in the centre embodies man's struggle to conquer the elements. The RAAF motto is inscribed on the base: PER ARDUA AD ASTRA : Through struggle to the stars.

The three black granite walls at the back were designed by Robert Boynes and were unveiled in 2002. The images and the words of the poem High Flight by John Gillespie Magee Jr symbolise service and sacrifice related to all RAAF personnel and particularly the more than 14,000 who have paid the supreme sacrifice. The list of RAAF battle honours are on the back faces of the two shorter walls.

== See also ==
- RAAF Memorial, West Island
