= West Island Elevated Houses =

- Location within Cocos (Keeling) Islands
- Location on the Cocos (Keeling) Islands

General information
- Status: Completed
- Type: Houses for government employees
- Location: Orion Close, West Island, Cocos (Keeling) Islands, Australia
- Coordinates: 12.1940°S 96.8333°E
- Completed: c. 1950s
- Client: Australian Government

Technical details
- Material: Cement asbestos

Commonwealth Heritage List
- Official name: West Island Elevated Houses
- Type: Listed place (Historic)
- Designated: 22 June 2004
- Reference no.: 105359

The West Island Elevated Houses are heritage-listed houses at Orion Close, West Island, Cocos (Keeling) Islands, an external territory of Australia. It was added to the Australian Commonwealth Heritage List on 22 June 2004.

== History ==
The West Island Elevated Houses were built during the 1950s as part of the establishment of housing for Australian Government employees administering the Cocos (Keeling) Islands. The houses were built as part of the West Island housing settlement.

== Description ==
The West Island Elevated Houses are the last houses to the south of the West Island Housing Area. There are two houses clad in cement asbestos and have a plan form and design suited to local climatic conditions. Most have distinctive raking on end walls and there are several variations on the "Type 2" plan which have been achieved by lengthening the base plan. The houses mainly have three bedrooms, kitchen, bathroom and living room with a large hall leading onto the front porch. There is a separate laundry out the back of the house. The Shire Clerk's house has a large added verandah to the west.

In 2000 the condition of the houses was assessed as still being good.

== Heritage listing ==
The West Island Elevated Houses are significant for their association with the establishment of housing for Australian Government employees administering the Cocos (Keeling) Islands. The presence of the Australian Government assisted the self determination of the Cocos Malay people. The houses are significant in the development of the West Island settlement which grew after Government House was located on West Island in 1953.

The Elevated Houses are significant as examples of Australian Government housing on the Cocos (Keeling) Islands with a plan form and design suited to local climatic conditions. The two houses are larger variations of standard "Type 2" houses and their siting to the far south of West Island, near the administrator's residence, indicates their important status on the Islands.
