= Direction Island Houses =

- Location within Cocos (Keeling) Islands
- 12.1932°S 96.8330°E
- Location: Air Force Road, West Island, Cocos (Keeling) Islands, Australia

Commonwealth Heritage List
- Official name: Direction Island (DI) Houses
- Type: Listed place (Historic)
- Designated: 22 June 2004
- Reference no.: 105358

Direction Island (DI) Houses is a heritage-listed houses at Air Force Road, West Island, Cocos (Keeling) Islands, Australia. It was added to the Australian Commonwealth Heritage List on 22 June 2004.

== History ==
The two remaining Direction Island Houses were originally located on Direction Island as part of the signal and air rescue station which answered calls for assistance from passing ships and aircraft with sick or injured passengers and crew in the 1950s. Five modern bungalows, designed for local weather conditions, were pre-fabricated in Australia and shipped to Direction Island where they were erected along the lagoon shores. When the station closed in 1966 the houses were relocated to West Island.

== Description ==
The Direction Island Houses are the two most southerly houses on the western side of Air Force Drive on the southern end of West Island. There are two houses which are timber framed and modular. They have verandahs to the long sides, which are screened at the rear, and distinctive sloped paired posts. The design of the houses is unique and well suited the island's climate and they are believed to have been pre-fabricated in Australia.

In 2000 the houses were assessed to be in mainly good condition.

== Heritage listing ==
The Direction Island Houses are significant as two houses remaining from the former Direction Island signal and air rescue station which answered calls for assistance from passing ships and aircraft with sick or injured passengers and crew in the 1950s. The Houses were relocated to West Island after 1966, when the station closed.

The Houses have been surveyed as two of four surviving examples of Direction Island houses on the Cocos (Keeling) Islands. The design is well suited to the Islands' climate and the Houses are reported as having been pre-fabricated in Australia and shipped to the Islands.
