= Type 2 Residences =

- Location within Cocos (Keeling) Islands
- Location on the Cocos (Keeling) Islands

General information
- Status: Completed
- Type: Houses for government employees
- Location: Air Force Road, West Island, Cocos (Keeling) Islands, Australia
- Coordinates: 12.1928°S 96.8327°E
- Completed: c. 1950s
- Client: Australian Government

Technical details
- Material: Cement asbestos

Commonwealth Heritage List
- Official name: Type 2 Residences
- Type: Listed place (Historic)
- Designated: 22 June 2004
- Reference no.: 105357

The Type 2 Residences are six heritage-listed houses on Air Force Road, West Island, Cocos (Keeling) Islands, Australia. It was added to the Australian Commonwealth Heritage List on 22 June 2004.

== History ==
The "Type 2" houses were built during the 1950s as part of the establishment of housing for Australian Government employees administering the Cocos (Keeling) Islands. The houses were built as part of the West Island housing settlement. Originally eight were built; now only six remain.

== Description ==
The "Type 2" residences are located on the eastern side of the West Island Residential Area facing the airstrip. The elevated asbestos cement clad houses have a plan form and design suited to local climatic conditions.

Several variations of the houses have been achieved by lengthening the base plan and most have distinctive raking on the end walls. The houses mainly have three bedrooms, kitchen, bathroom and living room with a large hall leading onto the front porch. There is a separate laundry out the back of the house.

The Type 2 Residences are located on Lots 128, 191, 121 122,127 and 129 Air Force Road, West Island Settlement.

In 2000 the residences were assessed as being in good condition. Some have had alterations and small ancillary buildings such as carports, two storage sheds and other additions have been added.

== Heritage listing ==
The Type 2 Residences on West Island are significant for their association with the establishment of housing for Australian Government employees administering the Cocos (Keeling) Islands. The presence of the Australian Government assisted the self determination of the Cocos Malay people. The houses are significant in the development of the West Island settlement which grew after Government House was located on West Island in 1953.

The elevated houses are significant as examples of Australian Government housing on the Cocos (Keeling) Islands with a plan form and design suited to local climatic conditions.
