= RAAF Memorial, West Island =

RAAF Memorial
- Australia
- For Royal Australian Air Force
- Location: 12.1883°S 96.8283°E; West Island, Cocos (Keeling) Islands
- Total burials: 4

Commonwealth Heritage List
- Official name: RAAF Memorial
- Type: Listed place (Historic)
- Designated: 22 June 2004
- Reference no.: 105353

The RAAF Memorial is a heritage-listed war memorial at West Island, Cocos (Keeling) Islands, Australia. It was added to the Australian Commonwealth Heritage List on 22 June 2004.

== Description ==
The RAAF Memorial is at located adjacent to the southwestern corner of Lot 180, West Island Settlement.

It consists of four masonry memorials in a steel fence enclosure located on West Island between the road and beach. The subtext on the larger memorial reads: "The airmen lost their lives in an heroic attempt by members of 2 A.C.S. to rescue Atkinson and four members of the Royal Navy Marines who were in danger of drowning beyond the reef off this point on Sunday 6 April 1952".

In 2000 it was noted that the memorials were still in fairly good condition, but the steel fence was rusting.

== Heritage listing ==
The RAAF Memorial is significant for its association with the post-World War II development not only of the Cocos (Keeling) Islands, but of Australia as well. This was an era in which the isolation of Australia and the Cocos (Keeling) Islands was being eroded by the advent of airflight.

The quality of the RAAF Memorial and its formal presentation is evidence of the social and cultural significance of World War II to the Islands' inhabitants. The well-maintained condition is evidence that the Memorial has social value.

== See also ==
- List of Australian military memorials
- Military Memorials of National Significance in Australia
