= Imperial Theatre, Saint John =

Imperial Theatre
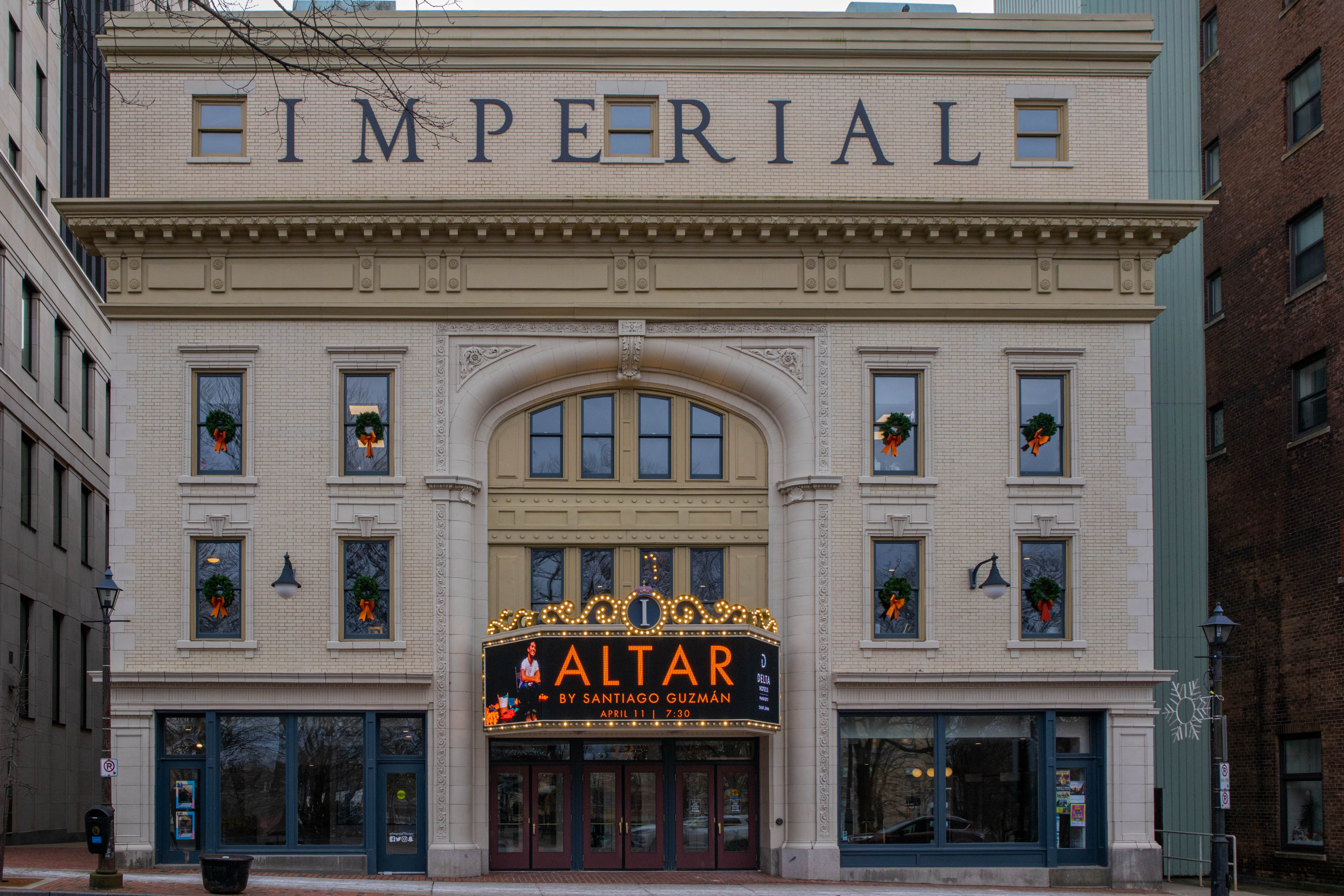
- Front façade of the Imperial Theatre
- Interactive map of Imperial Theatre
- Address: 12 King Square South; Saint John, New Brunswick; E2L 5B8
- Coordinates: 45.272727°N 66.057729°W

Construction
- Opened: 1913
- Reopened: 1994

National Historic Site of Canada
- Official name: Imperial / Bi-Capitol Theatre National Historic Site of Canada
- Designated: November 15, 1985

New Brunswick Heritage Conservation Act
- Official name: Imperial Theatre
- Type: Local Historic Place
- Designated: March 18, 1982
- Architect: Albert Westover

The Imperial Theatre is a historical theater at King's Square in Saint John, New Brunswick, Canada. It was designed by Philadelphia architect Albert Westover and built in 1912 by the Imperial Theatre by the Keith-Albee-Orpheum Corporation vaudeville chain of New York City and their Canadian subsidiary, the Saint John Amusements Company Ltd. It opened to the public on September 19, 1913.

One of Canada's first comedy troupes, The Dumbbells staged several of their first shows there. Many early stars of silent film had their films played in the Imperial, such as Charlie Chaplin, Buster Keaton, Fatty Arbuckle, Greta Garbo, and Harold Lloyd.

In 1928, the Imperial Theatre became home to Acadia Broadcasting's first commercial radio station. The theatre was designed as a modern adaptation of the Italian Renaissance, and was used both for live vaudeville acts as well as "talkies". In 1929, it was renamed the Capitol Theatre, and like most vaudeville houses across the continent, became a cinema.

From 1957 to 1982, the Imperial Theatre was used as a meeting space by the Full Gospel Assembly. In 1982 the Imperial was abandoned by the religious group.

== Renaissance of the Imperial Theatre ==
In the mid-1980s, a grass-roots campaign began to save the theatre began with a $1 down-payment (on a $1 million option to purchase the building, with the balance due within one year) by a local taxi driver. By the deadline, over $1.1 million had been raised, most of which was contributed by the citizens of Saint John. This is the reason for the high interest in the Imperial - every individual in the city owns a part of it. Seats in the theatre have the names of contributors.

The theatre has been restored to its 1913 glory, with the original mouldings and intricate plasterwork having been repaired or replicated. The interior of the Imperial has been faithfully re-created. The Imperial has been designated a National Historic Site of Canada.

== Technical details ==
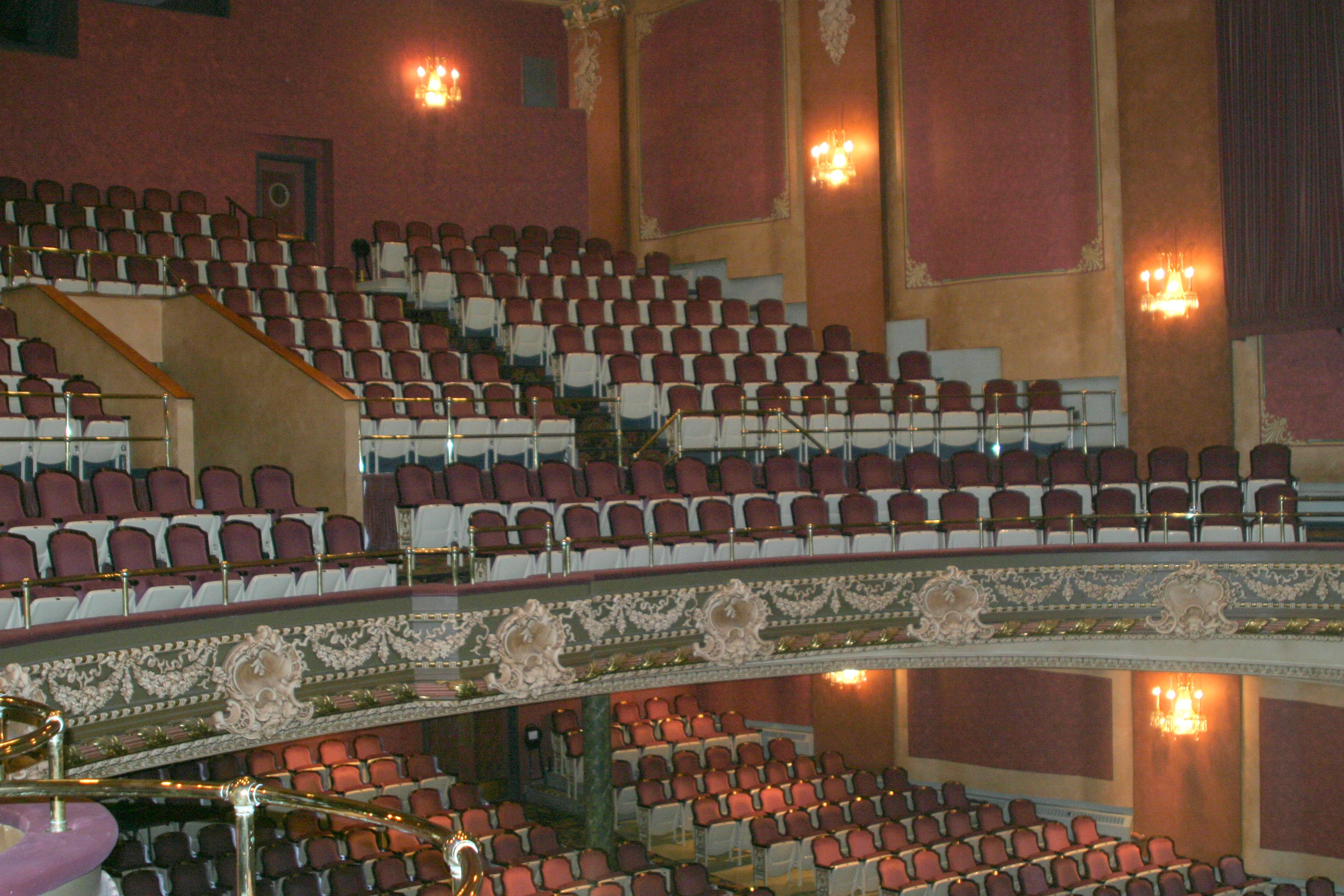
View of the balcony

Imperial Theatre is a fully restored Victorian proscenium arch-type facility.

STAGE DIMENSIONS

Proscenium arch width: 42’ - 6’ height: 26’ - 2’ (at centre line)

Curtain line to upstage wall: 42’ - 0’ downstage apron: 3’ - 0’ edge of pit elevator: 11’ - 0’

Centre-line to stage left clear: 48’ - 6’" stage right clear: 38’ - 3"

Wing free height up stage left: 21’ - 6" down stage left: 27’ - 5" stage right: 22’
