= Government House, West Island =

Government House
- Location within Cocos (Keeling) Islands
- Location on the Cocos (Keeling) Islands

General information
- Status: Completed
- Type: Official residence
- Location: Qantas Close, West Island, Cocos (Keeling) Islands, Australia
- Coordinates: 12.1937°S 96.8328°E
- Completed: c. 1953
- Client: Australian Government

Technical details
- Material: Cement asbestos
- Floor area: One

Commonwealth Heritage List
- Official name: Government House
- Type: Listed place (Historic)
- Designated: 22 June 2004
- Reference no.: 105360

Government House is a heritage-listed official residence at Qantas Close, West Island, Cocos (Keeling) Islands, Australia. It was added to the Australian Commonwealth Heritage List on 22 June 2004.

== History ==
Government House was constructed c. 1953 as part of the Australian Government representation on the Cocos (Keeling) Islands. Although part of the West Island Housing Precinct, Government House is significantly different from the other Australian Government houses on the island.

== Description ==
Government House is located on the ocean front at the southern end of the West Island housing precinct. It is set in an attractive garden landscape setting with open grasslands, palm trees and other specimen plantings of tropical vegetation.

Government House is a large single-storey asbestos elevated building clad with asbestos sheeting. There is a separate garage and a brick guest house originally an asbestos clad structure. There is a formal driveway with white painted edges, a flag pole, fencing and the house it set up for formal entertaining. The site is enclosed with a white timber fence and has a formal entry with large trees planted at the entrance.

In 2000 the condition of the house was assessed as good, although it is not currently used as a permanent residence. The garden and fence require some attention.

== Heritage listing ==
Government House, constructed in c. 1953, is an important symbol of Australian Government representation on the Cocos (Keeling) Islands.

Government House is significant as an early house constructed for the Australian Government representative on the Cocos (Keeling) Islands. The presence of the Australian Government assisted the self determination of the Cocos Malay people. The house is significant as the catalyst for the development of the West Island settlement which grew after Government House was located on West Island. After 1953 other government, administrative and hospital quarters were constructed.

Government House is a significant variant on other early Australian Government houses on the Cocos (Keeling) Islands. It features a similar design, suited to local climatic conditions and includes a formal driveway with white painted edges, fencing, a flag pole and area for entertaining. It is sited with ocean frontage.
