= Military Memorials of National Significance in Australia =

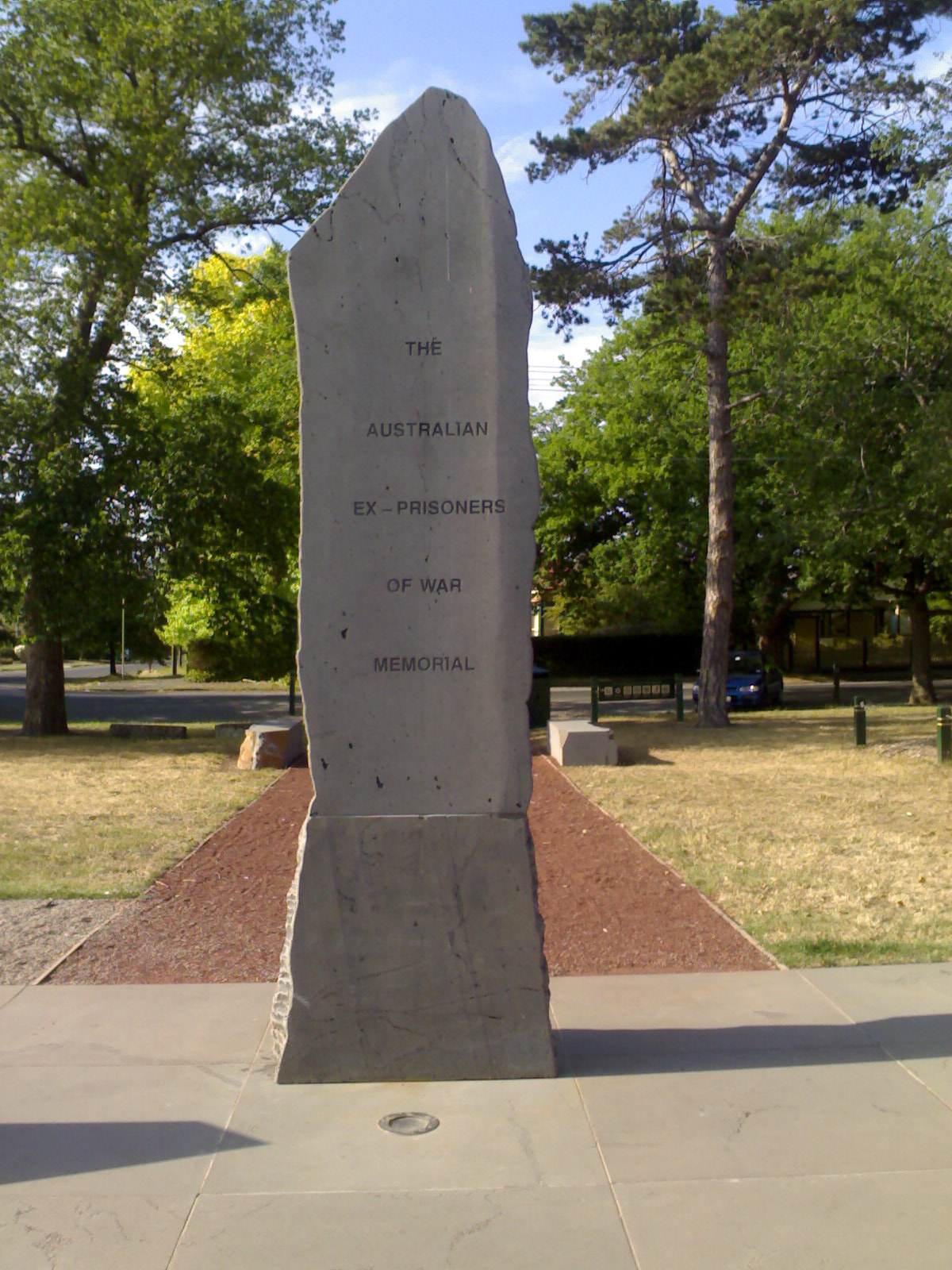
The first memorial to be declared a Military Memorial of National Significance was the Australian Ex-Prisoners of War Memorial

Military Memorials of National Significance meet a set of ten criteria laid down in the Military Memorials of National Significance Act of 2008 which received assent in the Australian Government on 12 Jul 2008. All such memorials are on public land within a State or the Northern Territory but outside the Australian Capital Territory. The Act allowed memorials outside Canberra to be recognised as National Memorials and the first to receive such recognition was the Australian Ex-Prisoners of War Memorial at Ballarat. The Member for Ballarat, Catherine King was instrumental in passing this legislation.

As of July 2017 there are eight memorials declared as Military Memorials of National Significance:

- Australian Ex-Prisoners of War Memorial, 2008
- HMAS Sydney II, 21 May 2009
- Shrine of Remembrance, 4 November 2009
- ANZAC War Memorial, 23 April 2013
- Korean War Memorial in Moore Park, Sydney, 23 April 2013
- Sydney Cenotaph, 23 April 2013
- Queensland Korean War Memorial, 25 August 2015
- Desert Mounted Corps Memorial, July 2015

== See also ==
- List of Australian military memorials
