= Direction Island Slipway and Tank =

Heritage site on Direction Island, Australia

Slipway and Tank
- Location of the Cocos (Keeling) Islands in the Indian Ocean
- Location on the Cocos (Keeling) Islands
- 12.0912°S 96.8855°E
- Type: Industrial remnants
- Location: Direction Island, Cocos (Keeling) Islands, Australia

Commonwealth Heritage List
- Official name: Slipway and Tank
- Type: Listed place (Historic)
- Designated: 22 June 2004
- Reference no.: 105221

The Direction Island Slipway and Tank are heritage-listed industrial remnants at Direction Island, Cocos (Keeling) Islands, Australia. The site was added to the Australian Commonwealth Heritage List on 22 June 2004.

== History ==
By the end of 1827 there were two groups of European settlers on the Cocos (Keeling) Islands and there was antagonism between the two settlement leaders, John Clunies-Ross and Alexander Hare. Clunies-Ross and his party first visited the Cocos (Keeling) Islands in 1825 but did not settle there until the end of 1827. A former business partner of Clunies-Ross, Alexander Hare, and his party settled on the Islands early in 1827, months before Ross' return, with a party of 40, including many women reputedly taken to the Islands against their wishes.

John Clunies-Ross was desirous of establishing a supply depot on the Islands for spices and coffee for shipment to Europe. He imposed an imperialist social and political regime on the Islands and managed them as a coconut plantation using non European labour which gave the Clunies-Ross family great power. He established a contractual arrangement between his family and the Malay and later Bantamese people, who would provide labour for the plantations and for copra production. The Clunies-Ross family provided a house and land for each family. Rates of pay were fixed at half a Java rupee for 250 husked nuts per day or reasonable services for labour. There were set rates of deduction for absences from work. The agreement bound the families and community heads to obey rules and lawful commands or quit the Islands and move elsewhere.

Initially, there was an unsuccessful revolt against Clunies-Ross by a group of Malay people but a written agreement was in force from 22 December 1837.

In the middle of the nineteenth century, convict labour was brought to the Islands from Java but indentured labour soon replaced it entirely. A few Javanese seamen joined the community and there was intermarriage between Cocos Malay women and Clunies-Ross men. There were a number of illegitimate children born in the settlement. Sometimes the children were sent to Singapore to live but more usually they were reared in the mother's house and took the name of her Malay husband.

Home Island was the location for the Clunies-Ross family and a settlement for the Cocos Malay work force. It was the site of industry where coconuts were processed into copra and coconut oil. The Island contained workshops for the production of material for use on the islands and the storage of imported food stuffs. Wharves, store houses, workshops and factories were part of the economy and the system of social control on the islands.

The dried flesh of coconut, or copra was the major export of the Cocos (Keeling) Islands. Other products for the settlement were imported.

The coconuts were husked, opened and the inside flesh was dried in the sun or later by artificial heat in purpose built furnaces. The oil was also exported. Home Island contains the remains of the storage sheds and furnaces required for copra production and export.

The wharfs and workshops were first found in the Clunies-Ross area at Lot 14 on Home Island, facing south across the lagoon, however by the 1880s a new workshop area was constructed on the western shore of the island. New buildings and a jetty to load and unload ships were erected with a series of railway tracks to move produce on the Island. The precinct remains in 1997 and is in continued use as depots, stores and workshops for the Cocos Islands community.

The Clunies-Ross family established settlements to house European and non European workers. There was strict control over movement and communications from one island to another. Official visitors were discouraged from fraternisation with the Cocos Malay people. In 1901 a telegraph station was established on Direction Island in 1901 by the Eastern Extension Telegraph Company as a link between Perth, Western Australia and stations in Rodrigues and Mauritius and to Batavia. The equipment was destroyed during the Battle of Cocos in World War I when in 1914 a German party from the cruiser Emden landed on Direction Island during World War I. The cable staff managed to send a message reporting the cruiser and HMAS Sydney arrived and a sea battle ensued.

During World War II, the Islands were occupied by the armed forces and there was open scrutiny of the working and living conditions there. A unit of the Ceylon Coastal Artillery was posted to the Islands. Two six-inch guns were located on Horsburgh Island and a company of the Ceylon Light Infantry was established on Direction Island. On South Island a regiment of Kenyan soldiers was established. In March 1942, a Japanese warship shelled Home Island. Similar air raids destroyed nearly one-tenth of the village in the months that followed. Perhaps as a consequence, and because of the islands' strategic location, the military presence was gradually increased. By the end of World War I, the population of the Island reached 1800. As a consequence, 900 people were persuaded or forced to leave the Island for Borneo, Singapore and Christmas Island.

An additional program of immigration occurred in the late 1970s at the end of the Clunies-Ross period of occupation. There was some form of agreement between the Ross family and the Islanders as late as 1978. In March 1945, units of the Royal Air Force, the Royal Indian Air Force and the Fleet Air Arm arrived and constructed an airstrip on West Island clearing thousands of coconut palms. Following the end of the War in late 1945 over 3,000 troops were evacuated. In the years after the War, the government of Singapore expressed that the paternalistic attitude of the Clunies-Ross family to the Cocos Malay workforce was unacceptable. By 1951, the Australian Government assumed control of the Islands and in the same year, amid disputes with Clunies-Ross over the management of the Islands, the family sold 150 hectares (370 acres) to the Australian Government for the construction of an airfield. There had previously been an airstrip for light aircraft in the 1940s which was used by Qantas infrequently. It was upgraded and after 1952 Qantas used the airstrip for refuelling on international flights from Australia to Europe via South Africa.

From 1944, a government administrator occupied a house on Home Island, however, Government House was located on West Island in 1953. As a consequence of these developments, the West Island community grew with government, administrative and hospital quarters for Australian government employees.

The Cocos (Keeling) Islands became an Australian external territory in 1955.

By the late 1960s the system administered by the Clunies-Ross family was a cause of concern for the Australian Government and the United Nations. There were negotiations for decolonisation and free association. After a United Nations delegation visited the islands in 1974, there were negotiations for the Australian Government to purchase the estate. By 1978 all the land, with the exception of the site of Oceania House, was completed. The people achieved self government and in 1979 a local council (the Shire of Cocos) was established and a cooperative formed to run the islands. By 1987 the copra industry was considered unprofitable and production ceased.

== Description ==
The Slipway and Tank are at the south-east point of Direction Island, at approximate UTMG point: 47LKG69906235.

The slipway was submerged with iron tracks on concrete. Directly in front, on land, is believed to be the concrete bases for the winch. The nearby water tank ruins consist of a concrete slab with the remains of the steel sides. The facility is the remaining evidence of the servicing of flying boats during World War I and possibly boats during the time of the air/sea rescue station. These were important functions in the strategic role of the islands.

In 1996 the concrete slipway was of fair condition with tracks rusted and the tank was collapsed and rusted.

== Heritage listing ==
The Slipway and Tank are significant as remaining evidence of the Islands' role in servicing flying boats during World War II and were possibly also associated with the servicing of boats during the time of the air and sea rescue station. These functions signify the important strategic location of the Cocos (Keeling) Islands in the Indian Ocean, and also indicate the former use and occupancy of Direction Island.
