= Culture of the Cocos (Keeling) Islands =

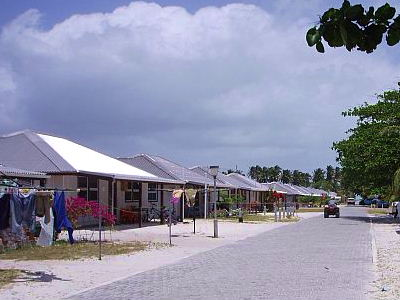
A typical street on Home Island.

Although it is an Australian External Territory, the culture of the Cocos (Keeling) Islands has extensive influences from Malaysia and Indonesia.

== Background ==
Languages, traditions, religious holidays, cuisine and customs have all been heavily influenced by the islands' large Cocos Malay population. Many of these islanders trace their descent from the original planation workers brought to the island by John Clunies-Ross. During much of their habitation, the islands were isolated, leading to the development of a unique culture derived from Malay and Islamic traditions.

When the Islands were fully integrated into Australia in 1984, it was introduced to the customs and culture of Mainland Australia, practiced predominantly by the ethnically European Australians who inhabit West Island.

All Islanders are governed by Australian law. Language, gazetted holidays, education, media and cuisine are also influenced by mainland Australia.

== Art and traditional crafts ==
The Islands have a strong history of art and traditional crafts influenced by Cocos Malay traditions and Australian surf culture. The Islands' tourism office encourages visitors to try their hand at traditional basket weaving and "learn about traditional jukong (boat) building".

== Museums ==
On Home Island, residents have established a museum dedicated to the Islands' former copra industry and an art gallery, The Big Barge Art Centre, which sells traditional artworks, modern paintings and photographic works and hosts art workshops for tourists.

The Pulu Cocos Museum was established in 1987, in recognition of the fact that the distinct culture of Home Island needed formal preservation. The site includes the displays on local culture and traditions, as well as the early history of the islands and their ownership by the Clunies-Ross family. The museum also includes displays on military and naval history, as well as local botanical and zoological items.

== Religion ==
In the 2016 census, 75% of the population was Muslim. Eid al-Fitr (at the end of Ramadan) remains the Islands' "biggest event" of the year.

The majority of the remaining population consider themselves non-religious (13.4%) with small Christian including Anglican (3.5%) and Catholic (1.5%). 6.5% of the population chose not to state their religion.

== Holidays ==
On 6 April of each year, the Islanders celebrate Self-Determination Day, marking the date in which they voted for full integration into Australia.

== See also ==
- Culture of Australia
- John Ross, King of Cocos Islands
