= South Keeling Islands =

Australian island group

Geography
- Location: Indian Ocean
- Coordinates: 12°10′N 96°52′E

Administration
- Australia

The South Keeling Islands are a group of 24 islands of the Cocos (Keeling) Islands, next to North Keeling, about 27 km (17 mi) to the north. The Australian atoll is located in the Indian Ocean about 2,930 km (1,821 mi) northwest of Perth, 3,685 km (2,290 mi) west of Darwin, 960 km (597 mi) southwest of Christmas Island and more than 1,000 km (621 mi) southwest of Java and Sumatra. Only two of the 24 islands are populated, with a total population of around 600.

== History ==
The islands are named after Captain William Keeling, who is believed to have been the first European to have visited, in 1609. The islands were not inhabited until 1826, when Alexander Hare moved his family to Home Island. The islands were ruled by John Clunies-Ross and his descendants between 1827 and 1986, even after the Cocos Islands became an Australian territory in 1955.

== Geography ==
The atoll consists of 24 islands, with the largest being West, Home, South, Direction, and Horsburgh islands. West Island is the largest in the territory, with a length of 10 km (6 mi).

The South Keeling Islands have two inhabited islands with a combined population of 600, West Island and Home Island. The capital of the Territory of Cocos (Keeling) Islands is West Island while the largest settlement is the village of Bantam, on Home Island. The other islands are not permanently inhabited. A Malay ethnic group of just over 450 people live on the islands, the Cocos Malays, who live mainly in Bantam on Home Island. There are also about 150 Australians, most of whom live on West Island.

Islets forming the South Keeling Islands atoll (clockwise from north)
	Islet (Malay name)	Translation of Malay name	English name	Area (approx.)	
	Islet (Malay name)	Translation of Malay name	English name	km^{2}	mi^{2}
1	Pulu Luar	Outer Island	Horsburgh Island	1.04	0.40
2	Pulu Tikus	Mouse Island	Direction Island		
3	Pulu Pasir	Sand Island	Workhouse Island	0.01	0.00
4	Pulu Beras	Rice Island	Prison Island	0.02	0.01
5	Pulu Gangsa	Copper Island	Closed sandbar, now part of Home Island	0.01	0.00
6	Pulu Selma		Home Island	0.95	0.37
7	Pulu Ampang Kechil	Little Ampang Island	Scaevola Islet	0.01	0.00
8	Pulu Ampang	Ampang Island	Canui Island	0.06	0.02
9	Pulu Wa-idas		Ampang Minor	0.02	0.01
10	Pulu Blekok	Reef Heron Island	Goldwater Island	0.03	0.01
11	Pulu Kembang	Flower Island	Thorn Island	0.04	0.02
12	Pulu Cheplok	Cape Gooseberry Island	Gooseberry Island	0.01	0.00
13	Pulu Pandan	Pandanus Island	Misery Island	0.24	0.09
14	Pulu Siput	Shell Island	Goat Island	0.10	0.04
15	Pulu Jambatan	Bridge Island	Middle Mission Isle	0.01	0.00
16	Pulu Labu	Pumpkin Island	South Goat Island	0.04	0.02
17	Pulu Atas	Up Wind Island	South Island	3.63	1.40
18	Pulu Kelapa Satu	One Coconut Island	North Goat Island	0.02	0.01
19	Pulu Blan		East Cay	0.03	0.01
20	Pulu Blan Madar		Burial Island	0.03	0.01
21	Pulu Maria	Maria Island	West Cay	0.01	0.00
22	Pulu Kambing	Goat Island	Keelingham Horn Island	0.01	0.00
23	Pulu Panjang	Long Island	West Island	6.23	2.41
24	Pulu Wak Bangka		Turtle Island	0.22	0.08
