= Home Island Cemetery =

Cemetery in Cocos (Keeling) Islands, Australia

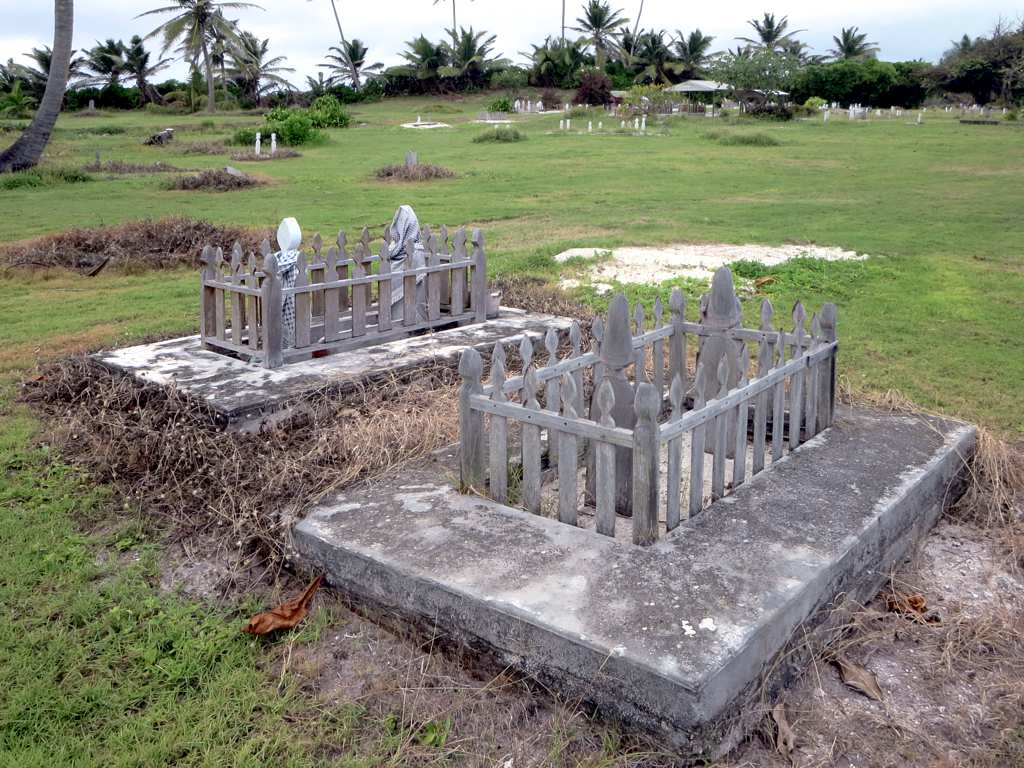
- Pulu Gangsa Cemetery, in 2015

Details
- Established: c. 1900
- Location: Pulu Gangsa, Home Island, Cocos (Keeling) Islands
- Country: Australia
- Coordinates: 12.1079°S 96.8887°E
- Type: Public
- Find a Grave: Home Island Cemetery

The Home Island Cemetery is a heritage-listed cemetery at Home Island, Cocos (Keeling) Islands, Australia. It was added to the Australian Commonwealth Heritage List on 22 June 2004.

== History ==
By the end of 1827 there were two groups of European settlers on the Cocos (Keeling) Islands and there was antagonism between the two settlement leaders, John Clunies Ross and Alexander Hare. Clunies Ross and his party first visited the Cocos (Keeling) Islands in 1825 but did not settle there until the end of 1827. A former business partner of Clunies Ross, Alexander Hare, and his party settled on the Islands early in 1827, months before Ross' return, with a party of 40, including many women reputedly taken to the Islands against their wishes.

John Clunies Ross was desirous of establishing a supply depot on the Islands for spices and coffee for shipment to Europe. He imposed an imperialist social and political regime on the Islands and managed them as a coconut plantation using non-European labour which gave the Clunies Ross family great power. He established a contractual arrangement between his family and the Malay and later Bantamese people, who would provide labour for the plantations and for copra production. The Clunies Ross family provided a house and land for each family. There was a written agreement in force from 22 December 1837 that bound the families and community heads to obey rules and lawful commands or quit the Islands and move elsewhere.

The original labourers who worked the plantations were brought primarily from Indonesia and the Malay Archipelago but also included Chinese, Indians, Africans and New Guineans. There was intermarriage between Cocos Malay women and Clunies Ross men as well a number of illegitimate children born in the settlement. Sometimes the children were sent to Singapore to live but more usually they were reared in the mother's house and took the name of her Malay husband.

Home Island was the location for the Clunies Ross family and a settlement for the Cocos Malay work force. It was the site of industry where coconuts were processed into copra and oil. The Island contained workshops for the production of material for use on the islands and the storage of imported food stuffs. Wharves, store houses, workshops and factories were part of the economy and the system of social control on the islands.

The Home Island Cemetery was originally located near the Clunies Ross area (of which some graves survive), however it was located on the far northern end of Home Island c. 1900, after a visiting doctor expressed concern about the quality of the water supply. Originally located on a separate island known as Pulu Gangsa, the island was joined onto the Northern end of Home Island in the late 1940s as part of land reclamation. The cemetery is still used by the Malay population and is an important place culturally.

== Description ==
Home Island Cemetery is at located at Pulu Gangsa, at the northern tip of Home Island (formerly a separate island, now a peninsula of Home Island).

Established c. 1900, it is an informally planned cemetery with three to four Clunies-Ross graves on the east side of a central track. On the western side is the cemetery of the Cocos Malay people, locally called Pulu Gangsa, and consists of Muslim graves.

The graves show a definite contrast in style between the two cultures represented. One of the Clunies-Ross graves has white glazed bricks and gravestones whilst the Muslim graves have wooden slats surrounding the graves instead of gravestones.

In 1996 the cemetery was found to be in generally good condition.

In 2000 the cemetery was found to be in poor condition and the significant headstones required urgent conservation. The exposed location has caused many of the graves to be damaged by wave action.

== Heritage listing ==
The Home Island Cemetery, established c. 1900, is significant as evidence of the Clunies Ross occupation of the Cocos (Keeling) Islands. It also provides evidence of the contract labour of the Cocos Malay people who developed the Islands as a coconut plantation and copra processing works from the early nineteenth century until the late 1970s.

The Home Island Cemetery is significant as a cemetery for European settlers and Cocos Malay people. It contrasts the style of graves for the two cultures represented.

The Home Island Cemetery contains graves of Clunies Ross family members and is significant for its association with the Clunies Ross family settlement on the Cocos Keeling Islands.
