= Six Inch Guns, Horsburgh Island =

Six Inch Guns
- Horsburgh Island, Cocos (Keeling) Islands in Australia

Site information
- Type: Former Artillery battery
- Owner: Australian Army
- Condition: Heavily corroded
- Facilities: Two 6-inch (15 cm) guns

Location
- Location of Cocos (Keeling) Islands in the Indian Ocean
- Coordinates: 12.0812°S 96.8438°E

Site history
- Built: c. 1941
- Materials: Steel

Garrison information
- Garrison: Ceylon Garrison Artillery; Ceylon Light Infantry

Commonwealth Heritage List
- Official name: Six Inch Guns
- Type: Listed place (Historic)
- Designated: 22 June 2004
- Reference no.: 105222

The Six Inch Guns are a heritage-listed former battery at Horsburgh Island, Cocos (Keeling) Islands, Australia. It was added to the Australian Commonwealth Heritage List on 22 June 2004.

== History ==
During World War II Horsburgh Island was occupied by armed forces. In November 1940 the Australian Army decided Cocos should guard against another Emden-type incident (Battle of Cocos) and a military presence be speedily arranged.

In 1941 Captain Koch of the Ceylon Garrison Artillery and his unit came to Horsburgh Island and installed two six-inch (fifteen-centimetre) guns to protect the atoll's main entrance and anchorage. This installation was to be supplemented by an infantry presence. The men who provided the islands' defences came from two volunteer corps, the Ceylon Light Infantry and the Ceylon Garrison Artillery under the command of British officers.

These volunteer soldiers eventually led the Cocos Islands mutiny on 8 May 1942 - the aim to hand over control of the islands to the Japanese. The mutiny went horribly wrong and resulted in one death and a few minor injuries. Four of the gunners were imprisoned and three executed. The two rusted gun emplacements remain on the southern point today as reminders of the military occupation of Horsburgh Island.

== Description ==
The guns are located at Possession Point on the south-east corner of Horsburgh Island. There are two guns, one on a steel base which has partially collapsed onto the beach. The other gun is approximately 50 metres (164 ft) inland. The barrel of the gun is detached and partially buried on the beach. There are stone and coral walls that extend into the lagoon.

The guns may be associated with World War II gun installations on Christmas Island.

=== Condition ===
In 1996, the guns were heavily rusted and parts were missing. The front gun has been undermined and the inland gun barrel has been separated.

In 2000 it was reported that due to the coastline having eroded so substantially, the barrel of the gun has been washed off into the sand further and the base now rests entirely on the beach rather than on the higher grassed lands as it once did. Several other bits of the gun are now lying exposed on the coral. All are heavily corroded. The gun mount in the grass area is also heavily corroded.

== Heritage listing ==
The Six Inch Guns, c. 1941, demonstrate the Cocos (Keeling) Islands' important strategic location in the Indian Ocean during World War II. World War II ended the relative isolation of the Islands and the military presence led to Australian and international scrutiny of the Clunies Ross family's paternalistic administration of the Cocos Malay people. This scrutiny was a catalyst for the Australian Government to assume control of the Islands in 1951.

The Six Inch Guns are surviving evidence of the armed forces occupation and impact of World War II on the Cocos (Keeling) Islands, and are the only remnant of the period when the Ceylonese Army was stationed on Horsburgh Island.
