= Ayam panggang =

Cocos (Keeling) Islands chicken dish

Ayam panggang (Minang-style roasted chicken) at Pagi Sore Babat Supat

Ayam panggang (Jawi Malay: ايم فڤݣڠ, transl. roasted chicken) (Note: The dish is sometimes translated to English as 'lemon chili chicken'.) is a variety of ayam bakar chicken dish from the cuisine of the Cocos (Keeling) Islands. The dish is differentiated from other Malay cuisine chicken dishes by the thick sauce that coats the chicken. The recipe was developed due to the living conditions of the Cocos (Keeling) Islands, giving rise to a dish much more dependent on coconut. The dish is made across the Cocos Malay diaspora, in Sabah, Malaysia as well as Western Australia.

== Preparation and consumption ==
Ayam panggang is made by marinating chicken in a thick sauce of coconut cream, candlenuts and Malay cuisine spices, such as chili peppers, coriander, turmeric and shrimp paste. The marinated chicken is then fried in coconut oil and served. Variations may include tamarind, lime or other acids.

Ayam panggang is traditionally served with nasi tumpang, a coconut and turmeric rice dish made from glutinous rice originating from Java, Indonesia. While nasi tumpang is served in various manners based on occasion in Javanese cuisine, in Cocos Malay cuisine, it is always served piled on a dish with ayam panggang put on top. The rice and chicken are then served by the head of the table while an imam prays over the dish.

Ayam panggang and nasi tumpang are served for many special occasions in the Cocos Malay community, such as for Islamic weddings, Aqiqah, Khitan, and iftar during Ramadan.

== History ==
The Cocos (Keeling) Islands were settled in the 1820s by the Cocos Malays at the behest of copra plantation owner John Clunies Ross. The native Malay cuisine of the Cocos Malay workers was heavily influenced by the isolation of the island, requiring recipes to be changed to incorporate more coconut and rely on essential ingredients from the Ross family company store, given that pay was low and only given in company scrip.
