= South Island, Cocos (Keeling) Islands =

South Island
Native name: Pulu Atas (Cocos Islands Malay)
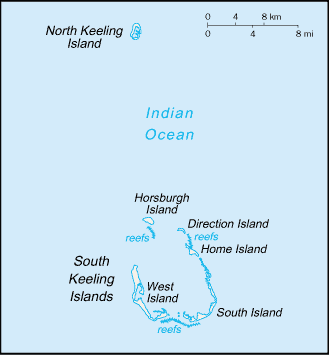

- West Island in the Indian Ocean

Geography
- Location: Indian Ocean
- Coordinates: 12°11′22″S 96°55′24″E
- Archipelago: Cocos (Keeling) Islands
- Area: 3.63 km^{2} (1.40 sq mi)
- Highest elevation: 9 m (30 ft)

Administration
- Australia
- External territory of Australia: Australian Indian Ocean Territories
- Territory: Cocos (Keeling) Islands
- Capital city: Canberra

Demographics
- Languages: English; Malay; Cocos Malay

Additional information
- Time zone: UTC+06:30

South Island (Cocos Islands Malay: Pulu Atas, lit. 'Upwind Island') is the southernmost and easternmost island of the Cocos (Keeling) Islands belonging to Australia in the eastern Indian Ocean.

The island belongs to the atoll of the South Keeling Islands. With an area of 3.63 km^{2} (1.40 sq mi), it is by far the second largest island in the archipelago after West Island. It is uninhabited. It is located 944 km (587 mi) southwest of the nearest Indonesian island, Enggano, and 1,088 km (676 mi) off the coast of Java. Christmas Island, which is also Australian, is 956 km (594 mi) in a west-northwest direction. South island is 9 m (30 ft) high, making it the highest point in the Cocos (Keeling) Islands.

South Island forms the southwestern edge of the atoll, so it is very curved. While the sea side is rather straight, consists of a beach and drops steeply after a few meters, the lagoon side is branched and only drops very gently. The island is heavily forested. Directly to the north are nine smaller islands, the first of which is Middle Mission Isle, followed by the inhabited Home Island after 4.3 km (3 mi). Numerous tiny, mostly elongated islands can be found on the lagoon side, never more than 350 metres (380 yards) from the coast. In the west there are three small islands off the coast (North Goat Island, East Cay and Burial Island), followed by a 1.2 km (1 mi) wide channel. Behind it is another small island and, a total of 2.3 km (1 mi) from South Island, the main island of West Island. Probably the only house on the island is in the north. There is a campground to the west.

Since the Cocos Islands are usually included in Asia because they are significantly closer to the coast of Indonesia than Australia, and South Island is the southernmost island in the group, it is the southernmost island of Asia and its southernmost point at 12 ° 12 ′ 32 ″ S, 96 ° 53 ′ 42 ″ E is also the southernmost point of Eurasia. If the Cocos Islands are not included in Asia, the southernmost point is on the Indonesian island of Pamana, 134 km (83 mi) farther north. If, however, the Australian Ashmore and Cartier Islands are also included in Asia, which are closer to Indonesia than to Asia, the southernmost point of Asia is 36 km (22 mi) farther south, on Cartier Island. The northernmost point of mainland Australia, Cape York, is 169 km (105 mi) farther south than South Island.
