= Early Settlers' Graves, Home Island =

Cemetery in Cocos (Keeling) Islands, Australia

Early Settlers' Graves
- Interactive map of Early Settlers' Graves

Details
- Established: c. 1890s
- Location: Jalan Kipas, Home Island, Cocos (Keeling) Islands
- Country: Australia
- Coordinates: 12.1189°S 96.8981°E

Commonwealth Heritage List
- Official name: Early Settlers Graves
- Type: Listed place (Historic)
- Designated: 22 June 2004
- Reference no.: 105362

The Early Settlers' Graves are heritage-listed burial places at Jalan Kipas, Home Island, Cocos (Keeling) Islands, Australia. The graves were added to the Australian Commonwealth Heritage List on 22 June 2004.

== History ==
The community cemetery (Home Island Cemetery) has not always been at the northern extremity of Home Island. During the late 1800s there were several other grave sites much closer to the present settlement. The decision to create a separate burial ground was made around the turn of the century after the recommendation of a visiting doctor who was concerned about the quality of the community's water supply.

A couple of these grave sites are still in evidence today. The Early Settler's Graves are located near the present school. The grave of Suma, an original settler from Alexander Hare's party, can still be seen beneath a tree at the back of the school. Suma arrived on Cocos as a small boy and went on to become an 'imam' or priest in the late nineteenth century. His leadership was praised by lone yachtsman, Joshua Slocum, who visited the islands in 1896.

== Description ==
The Early Settlers' Graves are located between the road (Jalan Kipas) and the sports field, behind the Home Island School, Home Island Settlement.

There are three graves, two with carved timber headstones that are of European style. 35 metres (115 ft) to the east there is a square stone that is flush with the ground.

In 1996 the timber headstones were beautifully weathered with the top broken off one headstone. The concrete surround was cracked. Urgent repair of the broken headstone is required to avoid loss and further damage.

== Heritage listing ==
The Early Settlers' Graves are rare examples of late nineteenth century settlers' graves on Home Island.

The Early Settlers' Graves include Suma's Grave which is significant for providing a historic link to Alexander Hare's party which settled on the Cocos (Keeling) Islands in the 1820s. Suma's Grave is also associated with the Clunies-Ross family's occupation of the Islands in the nineteenth century. Suma was a small boy who was an original member of Alexander Hare's party. He became an imam or priest in the late nineteenth century.
