= Cuisine of the Cocos (Keeling) Islands =

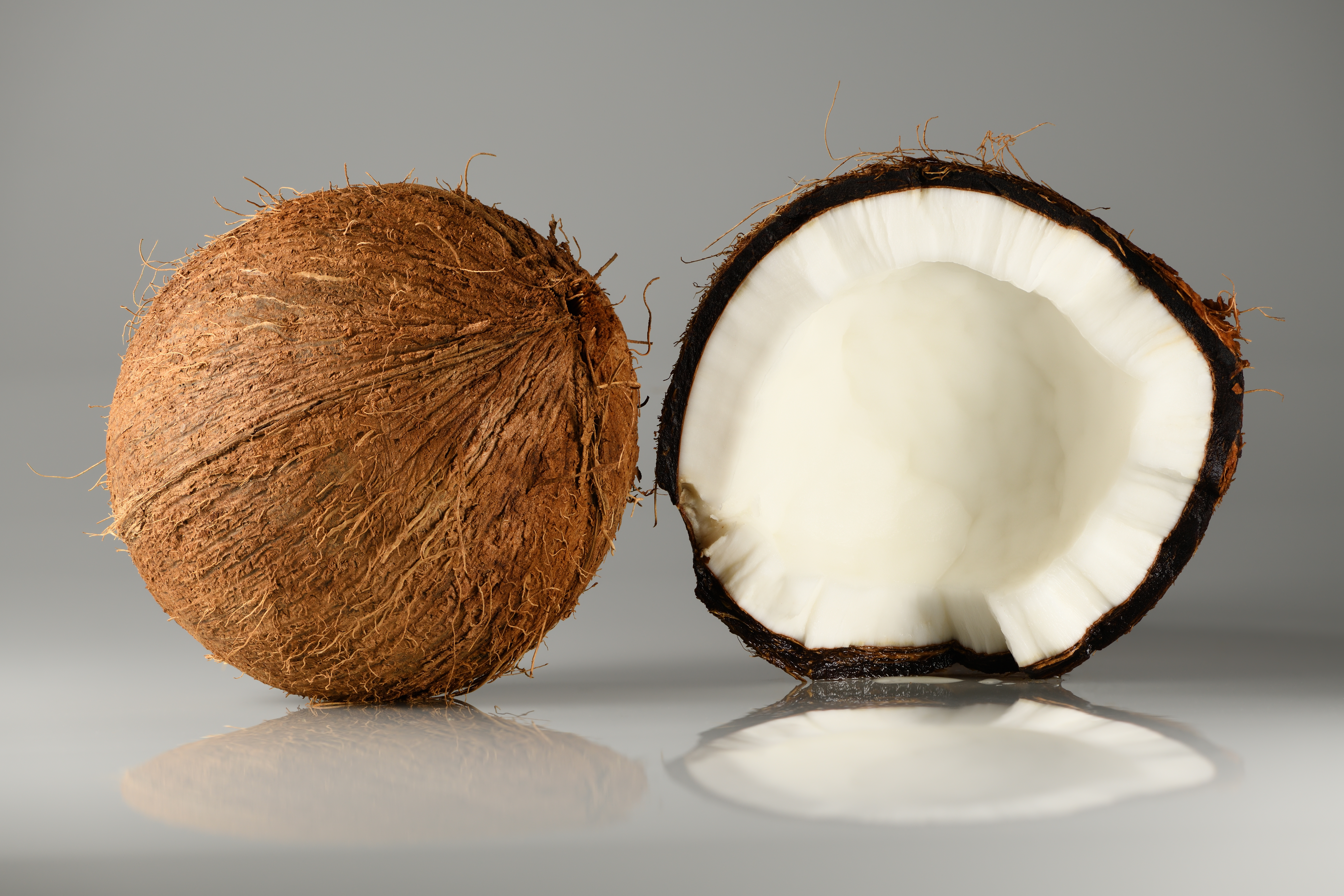
Coconut

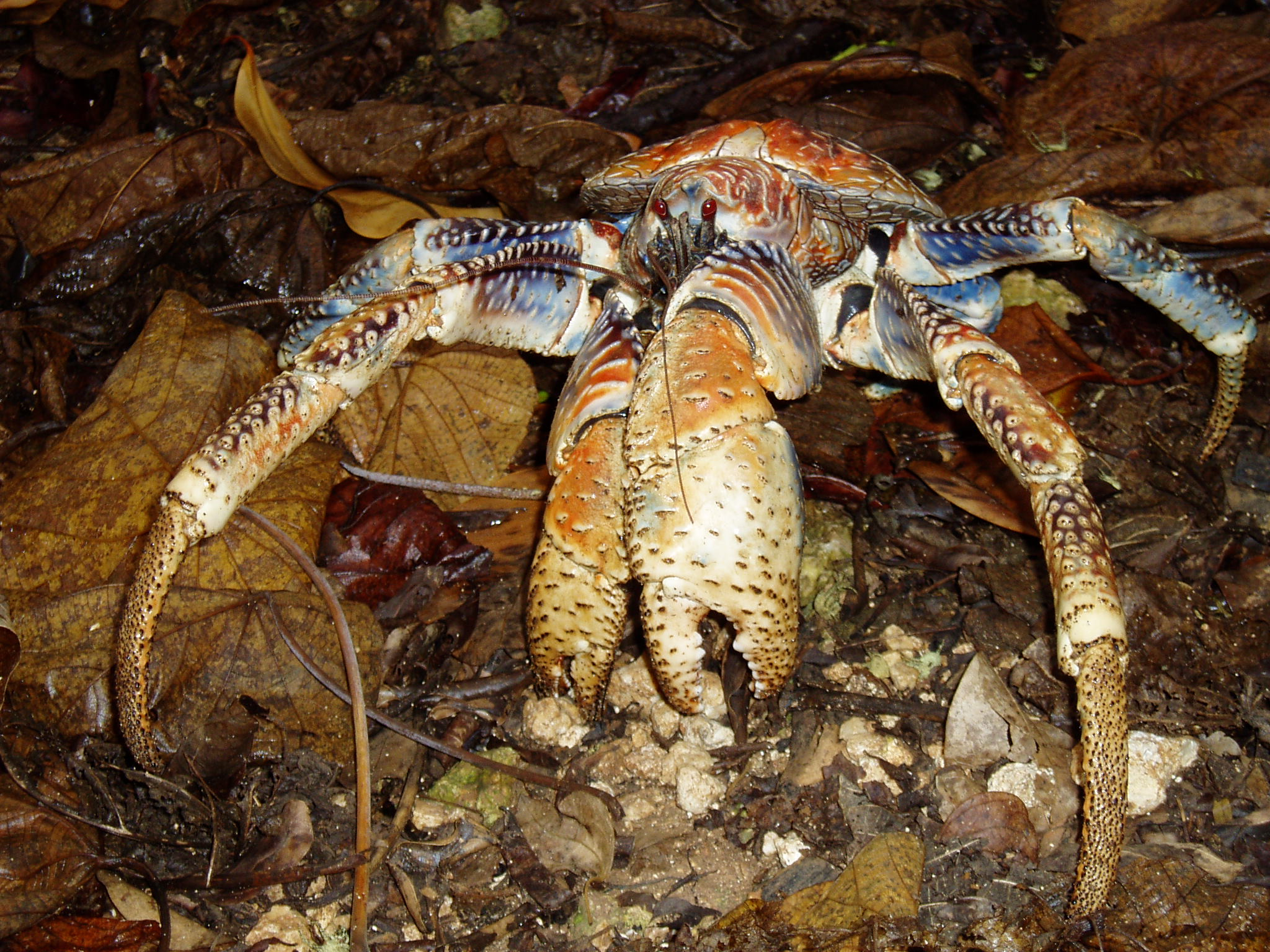
Coconut crab

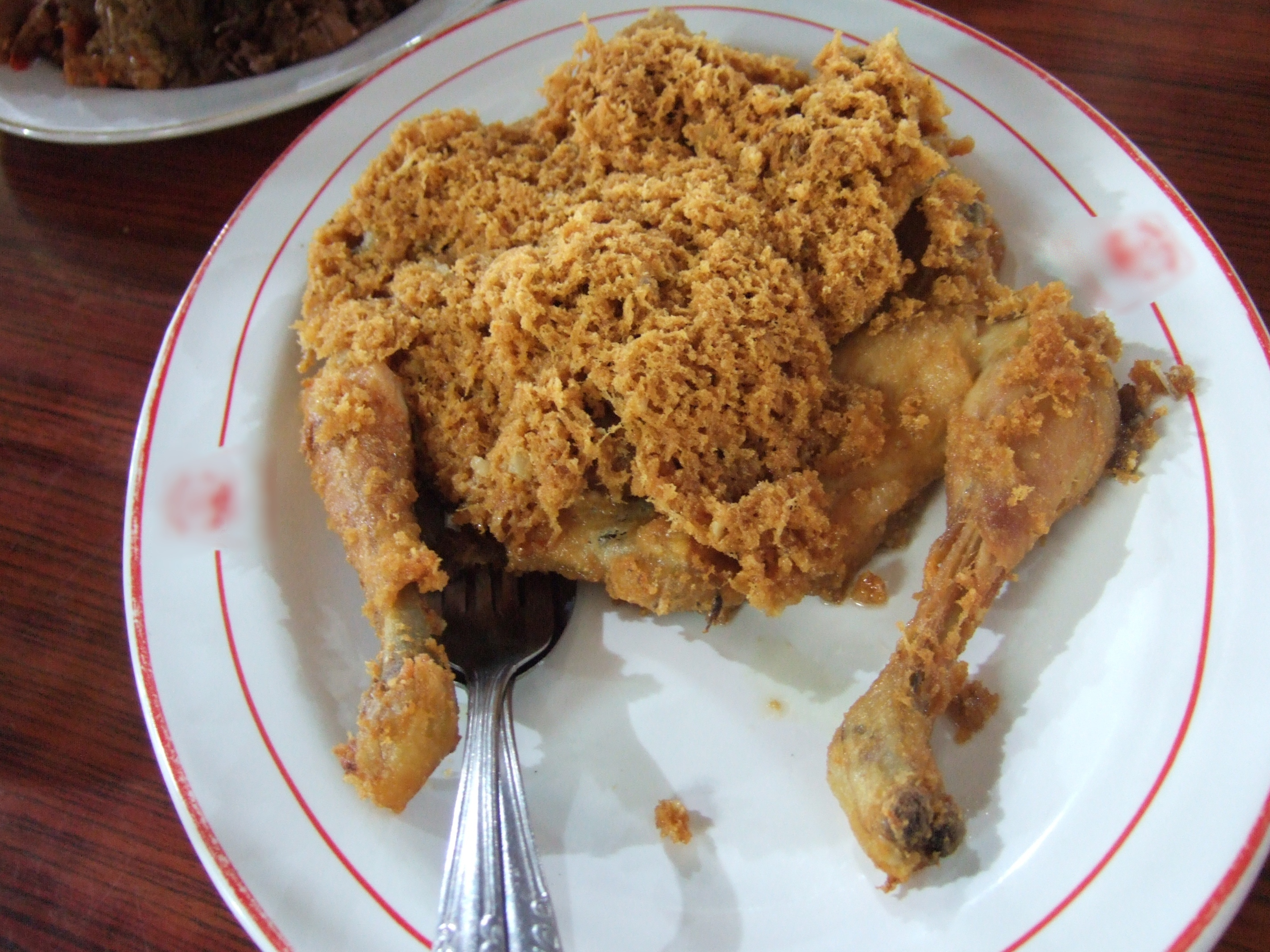
Ayam goreng

The cuisine of the Cocos (Keeling) Islands is primarily based on Malay cuisine, as the vast majority of the islands’ inhabitants are of Malay origin (Cocos Malays). However, it also has its own specific features. The influence of other Asian cuisines and Australian cuisine is also evident (since the Cocos (Keeling) Islands are part of Australia).

A very important ingredient in the cuisine of the Cocos (Keeling) Islands is the coconut (as reflected in the name of the islands). Coconut palms are cultivated on the islands, and the production of coconuts, coconut oil, and copra is a significant part of the local economy. A local specialty is also the coconut crab, a large crab that is caught for its meat. Other important ingredients on the islands include fish and seafood.

There are only a handful of restaurants, bars, fast food stalls, and supermarkets on the Cocos (Keeling) Islands, often catering to tourists.

Typical dishes of the Cocos (Keeling) Islands are mostly adapted from Malay cuisine, often simplified, as most ingredients have to be imported, and shops on the islands have not always been well-stocked historically; an example of this is ayam panggang, a Cocossian variant of an Indo-Malay chicken dish, adapted to rely on coconut. Among the most typical dishes are ayam goreng – spicy fried chicken pieces, nasi uduk – rice cooked in coconut milk, satay – grilled skewers, and ikan bakar – grilled fish.

== See also ==
- Australian cuisine
