= Home Island Foreshore =

- Location within Cocos (Keeling) Islands
- 12.1177°S 96.8937°E
- Location: Jalan Panti, Home Island, Cocos (Keeling) Islands, Australia

Commonwealth Heritage List
- Official name: Home Island Foreshore
- Type: Listed place (Historic)
- Designated: 22 June 2004
- Reference no.: 105363

The Home Island Foreshore is a heritage-listed cultural landscape at Jalan Panti, Home Island, Cocos (Keeling) Islands, Australia. It was added to the Australian Commonwealth Heritage List on 22 June 2004.

== History ==
The area referred to as the foreshore was constructed on land reclaimed by teams of village women early in the twentieth century. The area filled in was a small bay between the present jetty and Oceania House. The women carried by hand sand from two large dunes, countless coral boulders and hundreds of coconut logs. A shady avenue of trees was then planted along the waterline and this creates a buffer between the lagoon and kampong housing.

== Description ==
Home Island Foreshore is at about 0.5ha, comprising the whole of Lot 233 on the western side of Jalan Panti, but extending to Low Water in the west for the length of that lot and including a strip extending to 5m from the eastern edge of that lot, Home Island Settlement.

The reclaimed area includes an in-filled previous small bay with an avenue of shade trees. The sea wall consists of coral and demolished concrete slabs from Kampong houses.

In 1996 the condition was assessed as good.

== Heritage listing ==
The Home Island Foreshore and avenue of trees is significant for its association with the settlement of the kampong and the development of Home Island. It is also significant for its contribution to Cocos Malay settlement life providing a shady avenue linking the jetty area to Lot 14. The foreshore strip provides a buffer between the lagoon and kampong housing as well as a place to store boats and to view lagoon activities. Formerly a bay, the foreshore is part of land reclaimed by teams of village women earlier in the twentieth century. Sand from dunes, coral boulders and coconut logs were carried by hand and used to fill the bay.
