= Captain Ballard's Grave =

- Location within Cocos (Keeling) Islands
- 12.1155°S 96.8963°E
- Location: Home Island, Cocos (Keeling) Islands, Australia

Commonwealth Heritage List
- Official name: Captain Ballards Grave
- Type: Listed place (Historic)
- Designated: 22 June 2004
- Reference no.: 105361

Captain Ballards Grave is a heritage-listed burial place at Home Island, Cocos (Keeling) Islands, Australia. It was added to the Australian Commonwealth Heritage List on 22 June 2004.

== History ==
Captain Ballard is reported to have been an early settler who lived on Home Island in the mid-nineteenth century. He lived with his family on the Island. His two children, Dick and Maria were lost from the shores of the island known as Pulu Maria, which was apparently named after his daughter. Captain Ballard and his dog were buried south east of the copra sheds on Home Island.

== Description ==
There are two brick edged graves, one for a man and the other grave is that of a dog. The larger grave has a timber headstone. Captain Ballard's grave is a rare example of a Western style, late nineteenth century European settler's grave.

In 1996 the bricks of the graves were broken-up and there was vegetation growing through the plots. The timber headstones had collapsed and were decaying.

The site is hidden and hard to locate. The location should be professionally surveyed and plotted. The site should be protected from encroachment by adjacent dumping grounds. The collapsed timber headstone requires urgent retrieval and conservation before loss or further decay, brickwork edges stabilised and intruding vegetation cleared.

== Heritage listing ==
Captain Ballard's Grave is significant as evidence of the Clunies-Ross family's occupation of the Cocos (Keeling) Islands in the nineteenth century and their entrepreneurial activity in establishing a supply depot for the shipment of spices, coffee and other supplies. Captain Ballard and his family lived on Home Island in the mid-nineteenth century and were early European settlers. His two children, Dick and Maria, feature in the local history of Home Island because they were lost on the shores of the island known as Pulu Maria.
