= List of museums in the Cocos (Keeling) Islands =

Museums in the Cocos (Keeling) Islands include:

- Big Barge Arts Centre
- Home Island Visitor Centre & Museum
