= Old Co-op Shop =

- Location within Cocos (Keeling) Islands
- 12.1175°S 96.8953°E
- Location: Jalan Bunga Mawar, Home Island, Cocos (Keeling) Islands, Australia

Commonwealth Heritage List
- Official name: Old Co-op Shop (Canteen)
- Type: Listed place (Historic)
- Designated: 22 June 2004
- Reference no.: 105409

The Old Co-op Shop is a heritage-listed retail building at Jalan Bunga Mawar, Home Island, Cocos (Keeling) Islands, Australia. It was added to the Australian Commonwealth Heritage List on 22 June 2004.

== History ==
During the early 1900s the Co-op shop was originally used as a copra store - this was when industrial activity was moved away from Lot 14 to other parts of Home Island. The building is similar to other structures that were built by the Clunies-Ross family for the storage and processing of copra.

In 1979 the Cocos Islanders achieved self-government. The Cocos Islands Co-operative Society Limited was elected and they were responsible for business undertakings. Most of the working population belong to the co-operative society. The old copra store was used as the Co-op shop or supermarket and had the facilities of a cold room. In 2000 the building was no longer used due to disrepair.

== Description ==
The Co-op shop is located in the centre of the Kampong on Home Island.

The Co-op shop is rendered brick with engaged piers, corrugated iron roof and has a verandah added. It is believed to have been used a Copra Store and is similar to the Copra Store No 1 in the Home Island Industrial Precinct. There is also a asbestos cement clad building and a concrete tank at the rear associated with the period of self determination of the Cocos Malay people when the building was used as the Co-op shop.

In 1996 the early building brickwork was deteriorated; the new part of the building was in good condition.

In 2000 the original brick building was not in use and was in poor condition. The extension is in reasonably sound condition. The roof timbers of the original building are in a visual sound condition, although the connections through the top and bottom wall plates and into the footings are showing the effects of rust and moisture penetration. There is cracking in the brick along the line of the corroding lintels.

== Heritage listing ==
The Co-op Shop is significant for its use as a copra store and is evidence of the Clunies Ross occupation of the Cocos (Keeling) Islands in the nineteenth and twentieth century, and their entrepreneurial activity in establishing a supply depot for the shipment of spices, coffee and other supplies. It also provides evidence of the contract labour of the Cocos Malay people who developed the Islands as a coconut plantation and copra processing works from the early nineteenth century until the late 1970s.

Originally a store, it is important for its association with the copra industry which supported the Island's economy. The building's conversion to a Co-op Shop dates from the period when the Cocos Malay people achieved self government. In 1979 a local council was established and a co-operative formed to run the Islands.

The whitewashed walls of the Co-op Shop demonstrate a building type related only to early Clunies Ross copra storage and processing structures found on Home Island after the 1880s, when industrial activity was relocated away from Lot 14 on Home Island to other parts of the Island.
