= Pulu Cocos Museum =

Museum in Cocos (Keeling) Islands

Coordinates: 12°06′56″S 96°53′39″E

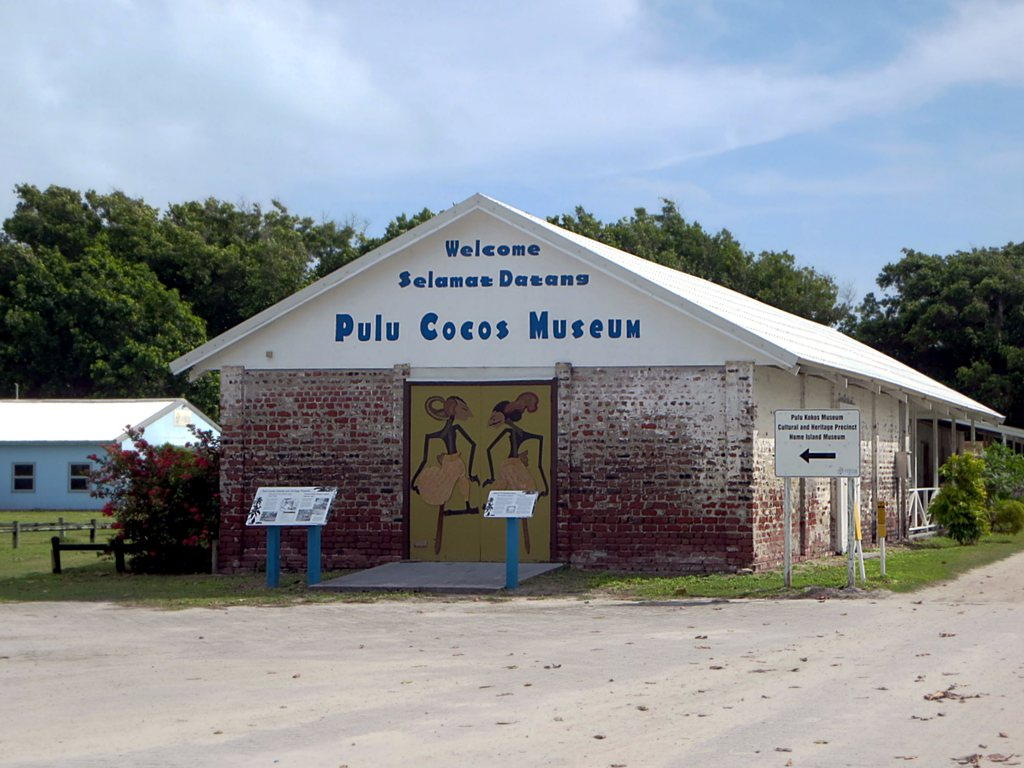
- Location: Cocos (Keeling) Islands
- Type: Heritage centre
- Collections: Military; Southeast Asian diaspora
- Website: https://www.cocoskeelingislands.com.au/visitor-centre

The Pulu Cocos Museum (Cocos Islands Malay: Muzium Pulu Kokos), also known as the Home Island Visitor Centre & Museum or simply the Cocos Museum, is a tourism office, visitor centre and museum on Home Island in the Cocos (Keeling) Islands.

== Background ==
The museum was established in 1987, in recognition of the fact that the distinct culture of Home Island needed formal preservation. The site includes the displays on local culture and traditions, as well as the early history of the islands and their ownership by the Clunies-Ross family. The museum also includes displays on military and naval history, as well as local botanical and zoological items. In February 2021 the Shire of Cocos applied for a grant in order to adapt the Tokoh/Old Workshop on Home Island into a new museum and visitor centre.

== Collections ==
The collection includes objects relating to the Malay communities who were indentured labourers under the Clunies-Ross family. Military objects in the collection include firearms cannonballs and bows and arrows. There is also a small numismatic collection. Objects include traditional Malay costumes and examples of wayang kulit, which were used in performances by Nek Ichang, the island's dalang (puppeteer) until his death in 1949. Examples of the wayang kulit from the museum's collection featured on a set of Australian $1 and $2 stamps in 2018.

Objects relating to the cultural heritage of the islands are held in overseas collections: for example the American Numismatic Association holds a complete set of the island' plastic token currency.
