= Maluka =

Former independent state on the island of Borneo

Coordinates: 3.53°S 114.68°E

- 1812–1816
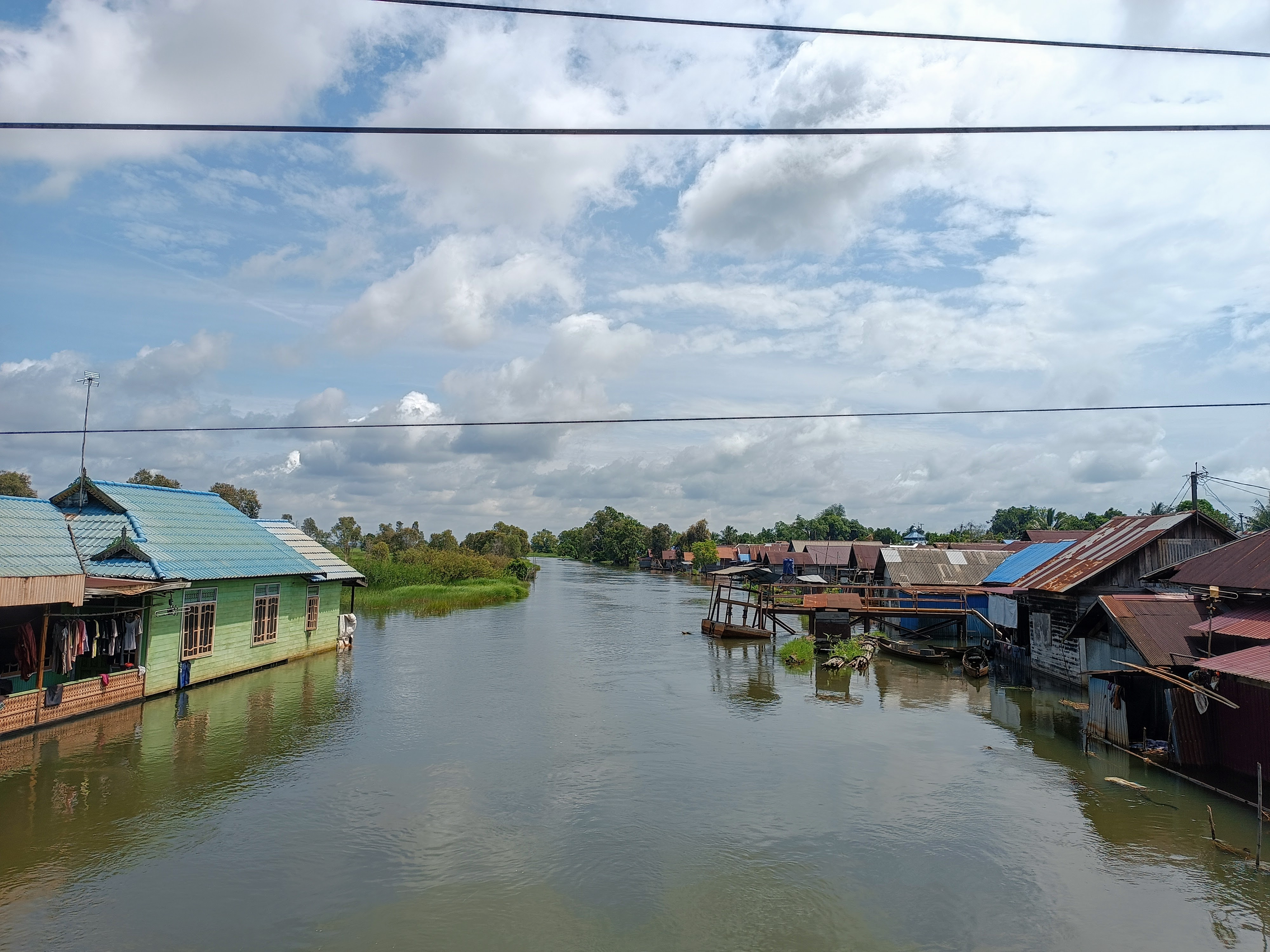
- Maluka river
- Capital: Maluka
- Government: Absolute monarchy
- Rajah
- Historical era: New Imperialism
  - Established: 1812
  - Disestablished: 1816
Preceded by	Succeeded by
Sultanate of Banjar	Dutch Empire
- Today part of: Indonesia

Maluka (or Maluko) was a small independent state located around the Sungei Maluka, southeast of Bandjermassin on the island of Borneo . It was established in a land concession acquired by an English adventurer Alexander Hare from the Sultan of Banjarmassin in 1812 and lasted 4 years until 1816.

== History ==
After the successful British invasion of the previously Dutch territory of Java in 1811 (part of the wider Napoleonic Wars of the time), Lieutenant-Governor Stamford Raffles of the British East India Company sent the private merchant Alexander Hare to the region and appointed him Resident of Banjarmasin and Commissioner of the Island of Borneo (1811–16).

Hare then acquired 1,400 square miles of land from the Sultan of Banjarmasin stretching along the coast from the mouth of the Barito River to Tanjong Selatan and inland to the north up to the Sungei Matapura. It was mostly marshland mixed with areas of grassland and some forest with a number of villages located on or near the coast. Hare established his land as an independent state which he ran as a private fiefdom, with the title of Rajah of Maluka. Maluka had a flag, issued coinage and collected customs duties. Thus he can be called the first White Rajah in Borneo, 30 years before James Brooke established his own White Rajahs dynasty in Sarawak.

Hare's activity came under great scrutiny with the British East India Company concerned about his use of company funds for the development of Maluka. There were also allegations that people had been forcibly relocated to the colony as a source of labour. A Commission of Inquiry, formed in 1816, investigated both charges, finding a great deal to complain about in terms of Hare's accounting. The Inquiry also faulted him with being aware that a number of females had been kidnapped and brought to the colony. However, the more serious charge, alleged by William Boggie, that he had enslaved over three thousand people was found to be unsupportable. William Boggie had his own grievances with Raffles, recorded in a letter written by his advocate James Simpson in 1834, and likely raised the issue as a means to discredit him—Raffles was widely known to detest the practice of slavery and if one of his appointees was found to be engaging in the practice on a massive scale it would have been extremely embarrassing. What is certain is that Hare faced a labour shortage that unless overcome would have made the development of his colony impossible. To overcome this obstacle, in 1812 he asked Raffles to have convicts from Java transported to Banjarmasin as part of their sentences as well as to encourage destitute individuals to migrate. The latter group was to be provided with assistance. Both could take their families, if they wished. However, the majority of both groups were single males and so, in order to rectify the imbalance, the authorities were enjoined to encourage female migration by offering a sum of money or release from debt.

The signing of the Anglo-Dutch Treaty of 1814, part of the aftermath of the Napoleonic Wars, was the beginning of the end for Hare's dream of an independent state. Although both Raffles and his successor as Lieutenant General, John Fendall, resisted Dutch requests for the Borneo colonies to be returned as they considered them deserted by the Dutch rather than conquered by the British and hence not falling under the terms of the treaty, this was not the position of the EIC as a whole. In January 1817, a Dutch representative signed a treaty giving them control of much territory around Banjarmasin in return for supporting the Sultan against his local and regional enemies. It is likely that Hare could have kept his estate despite this change of authority, but he antagonized the Dutch, making them feel that he was interested in using the estate as a springboard for further British intrusions on what they saw as their political and economic interests in the region. As a result, in 1818 the new Dutch government declared that Hare had no legal right to the property (the Sultan having conveniently lost the earlier treaty he had signed with Hare), ordering the local Dutch contingent to take control of the land, by force if necessary. This was done in July 1818.
