= Horsburgh Island =

Native name: Pulu Luar (Cocos Islands Malay)
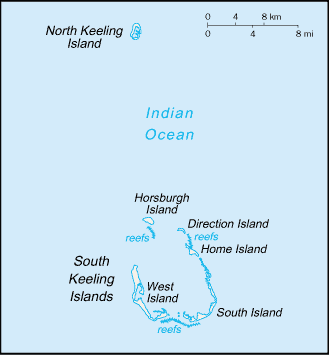
- Map of Cocos (Keeling) Islands
- Interactive map of Horsburgh Island

Geography
- Location: Indian Ocean
- Coordinates: 12.0766°S 96.8397°E
- Archipelago: South Keeling Islands
- Area: 1.061 km^{2} (0.410 sq mi)

Administration
- Australia
- Cocos (Keeling) Islands

Horsburgh Island (Cocos Islands Malay: Pulu Luar, lit. 'Outer Island') is an uninhabited islet in the South Keeling Islands atoll of the Cocos (Keeling) Islands, Australia. The island spans 1.061 km^{2} (0.410 sq mi), and is part of a marine protected area. It features a lagoon, coral reefs, and supports various seabird populations. The islands played a role in the Second World War.

== History ==
Named "Pulau Luar" in Malay language, Horsburgh Island was named after British hydrographer James Horsburgh, who charted the Cocos Islands in the early 1800s. The Clunies-Ross Family settled the islands and managed it. During the Second World War, the Ceylon Garrison Artillery installed two six-inch guns at its southern point for coastal defence. In May 1942, the Ceylon artillery garrison began the Cocos Islands Mutiny, intending to hand the islands over to the Japanese troops. The condemned mutineers were shipped back to Ceylon, and imprisoned. The six-inch guns have survived and are a historic relic, listed on the Australian Commonwealth Heritage List.

== Geography ==
Horsburgh is an uninhabited islet in the South Keeling Islands atoll of the Cocos (Keeling) Islands, Australia. The island spans 1.061 km^{2} (0.410 sq mi), and has a 4.2 km (2.6 mi) long coastline. It is located in the Australian plate in the South Indian Ocean, and is known to have occasional seismic activity. It experiences a tropical rainforest climate characterized by heavy rainfall throughout the year, high humidity, and high temperatures.

The topography is fairly flat, with most of the island located below sea level and the highest elevation on the island reaching approximately 2 m (6 ft 7 in). The island is characterized coastal lowlands with rocky gravel terrain and central flat plains.

== Flora and fauna ==
The island has a tree cover of 28%, and mostly consist of coconut trees planted during the copra extraction during the early 20th century. The island is surrounded by coral reefs, supporting aquatic life such as butterfly fish, maori wrasse, sea urchin, and sea cucumber. The surrounding lagoon and reefs form part of the Cocos Marine Conservation Area, part of the national marine park declared in 1995. Bird species recorded from the island include Pacific black duck, northern pintail, buff-banded rail, common sandpiper, brown noddy, white-tailed tropicbird, lesser frigatebird, brown booby, nankeen night heron, Asian house martin and Christmas white-eye.

== See also ==
- List of islands of Australia
