= Cocos Islands mutiny =

1942 attempted mutiny

- Part of World War II
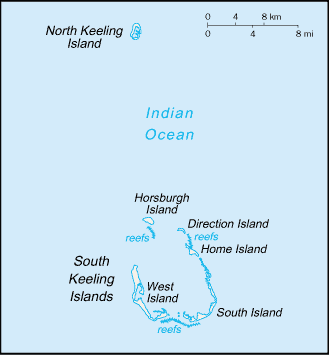
- Map of the Cocos (Keeling) Islands
Date	8 May 1942
Location	Cocos (Keeling) Islands
Result	British victory

Belligerents
United Kingdom; British Ceylon	Ceylonese mutineers

Commanders and leaders
Captain Gardiner	Gratien Fernando (executed)

Strength
26 men; 6-inch (152 mm) guns	15 men; 1 Bren light machine gun; 6-inch (152 mm); 9-inch (227 mm) guns

Casualties and losses
1 killed; 1 wounded	3 men executed; 8 imprisoned

The Cocos Islands mutiny was a mutiny by Ceylonese soldiers against British officers, on the Cocos (Keeling) Islands on 8 May 1942, during the Second World War.

The mutineers attempted to seize control of the islands and disable the British garrison. The mutineers was defeated and punished; the three ringleaders were sentenced to death, becoming the only British Commonwealth servicemen to be executed for mutiny during the Second World War.

== Background ==
Units belonging to the Ceylon Defence Force (CDF), including the Ceylon Garrison Artillery (CGA), the Ceylon Light Infantry (CLI) and the Ceylon Volunteer Medical Corps, were mobilised on 2 September 1939, the day before Britain declared war on Nazi Germany. The CGA was equipped with 6-inch (152 mm) and 9-inch (227 mm) guns. Several of them were posted to the Seychelles and the Cocos Islands, accompanied by contingents of the CLI and the Medical Corps. The full contingent of the CDF in the Cocos Islands numbered around 75 personnel. It was under the command of Captain George Gardiner, an accountant of an export firm in Colombo at the outbreak of war, he had obtained an emergency war commission. Two 6-inch guns were deployed on Horsburgh Island, Cocos Atoll, as well as a platoon of the King's African Rifles.

The sinking of Prince of Wales and Repulse and the fall of Singapore did to British and Imperial forces what the Attack on Pearl Harbor had to the Americans: compromised their ability to defend their interests north of Australia and east of India. The Japanese raids into the Indian Ocean, resulting in the loss of two cruisers and the aircraft carrier HMS Hermes, threw Allied war plans in the south-west Pacific into chaos.

With the Japanese successes, public sentiment on Ceylon increased in favour of the Japanese; encouraged by successful Japanese-trained and -directed rebellions in Indonesia and support for Japanese forces in Thailand, Sinkiang and the Philippines, many Ceylonese hoped that the Japanese would help them gain independence. J.R. Jayawardene held discussions with the Japanese with this aim in mind but this was immediately stopped by D. S. Senanayake who collaborated with the Colonial Government, being rewarded with the Premiership, being hand-picked to lead the post-colonial government after 1948.

== Mutiny ==
On the night of 8 May, 30 out of 56 personnel of the Ceylon Garrison Artillery on Horsburgh Island in the Cocos Islands mutinied, intending to hand the islands over to the Japanese. The plan was to arrest Captain Gardiner, the British Battery Commanding Officer and his deputy, Lieutenant Stephens, disarm the troops loyal to the British Empire, turn the 6-inch guns on the CLI troops on Direction Island and to signal the Japanese on Christmas Island, which the Japanese had occupied on 31 March 1942.

The mutineers proved to be poor shots with small arms. Gunner Samaris Jayasekera was killed; Lieutenant Stephens was wounded by them; and the rebels' sole Bren gun jammed at a crucial moment as Gratien Fernando, the leader of the mutiny, had it aimed at Gardiner. The rebels then attempted to turn the 6-inch guns on Direction Island but were overpowered.

Messages sent by Fernando were received in Ceylon, indicating that there was co-operation between him, the CLI troops and the Australian signallers on Direction Island. None of them took part in the mutiny and the CLI helped to put down the mutiny. He declared he had surrendered on condition that he would be tried in Colombo; it may be that he intended to give a speech from the dock to inspire his compatriots. The 15 mutineers were court-martialled on the Cocos Islands by Gardiner. Seven of the men who were found guilty were sentenced to death, with four of these sentences commuted to terms of imprisonment. Gunner Samaris Jayasekera was buried with full military honours on Horsburgh Island on the evening of 10 May and later reburied in Singapore's Kranji War Memorial.

The condemned mutineers were returned to Ceylon, imprisoned at the military jail in Flagstaff Street and then at military detention barracks at Hulftsdorp. The families of the condemned appealed to Sir Oliver Goonetilleke, the Civil Defence Commissioner and a member of the War Council to save them, H. W. Amarasuriya and Susantha de Fonseka, members of the State Council of Ceylon, also made representations to the Governor Sir Andrew Caldecott and Admiral Geoffrey Layton for clemency but their pleas failed. Fernando was defiant to the end, confidently believing that he would be remembered as a patriot, and refused a commutation of punishment. He was executed on 5 August 1942 at Welikada Prison, and two other mutineers shortly thereafter.

== Aftermath ==
The three mutineers were the only British Commonwealth troops to be executed for mutiny during the Second World War. The CDF detachment in Cocos Islands returned just before Christmas 1942. The veterans had their promotions suspended and were denied the campaign medals for war service. No Ceylonese regiment of the fighting arms was deployed by the British after the mutiny. Support units were deployed, most notably in North Africa. The defences of Ceylon were increased to three British army divisions because the island was strategically important, holding almost all the British Empire's resources of rubber that remained after the fall of Malaya. Rationing was instituted so that the Ceylonese were comparatively better fed than their Indian neighbours, to prevent disaffection among the natives.

The LSSP's anti-colonial agitation now included references to the Cocos Islands Mutiny as public opposition at British colonial rule continued to grow. Goonetilleke, the Civil Defence Commissioner claimed that Layton called him a 'black bastard'.

== Mutineers ==
The men who were convicted by court martial of mutiny were:

- Bombardier Gratien Fernando (executed 5 August 1942)
- Gunner Carlo Augustus Gauder (executed 7 August 1942)
- Gunner G. Benny de Silva (executed 8 August 1942)
- Gunner R. S. Hamilton — death sentence commuted to penal servitude for three years
- Lance Bombardier Kingsley W. J. Diasz — death sentence commuted to penal servitude for four years
- Gunner A. Joseph L. Peries — death sentence commuted to penal servitude for four years
- Gunner Gerry D. Anandappa — death sentence commuted to penal servitude for three years
- Gunner A. B. Edema — imprisonment for one year without hard labour
- Gunner M. A. Hopman — penal servitude for three years
- Gunner F. J. Daniels — penal servitude for seven years
- Gunner Kenneth R. Porritt — imprisonment for one year with hard labour
