= John Ross, King of Cocos Islands =

- Wireless Weekly 29 June 1940
- Genre: drama play
- Running time: 60 mins (8:30 pm – 9:15 pm)
- Country of origin: Australia
- Language: English
- Hosted by: ABC
- Written by: John Morgan
- Directed by: Paul O'Loughlin
- Original release: 5 July 1940

John Ross, King of Cocos Islands is a 1940 Australian radio play by John Morgan about John Ross of the Cocos (Keeling) Islands. It was the first play from Morgan, a New Zealander who lived in Sydney and worked as the manager of a firm.

It was produced as part of the 1940 Australian Radio Competition.

== Premise ==
According to ABC Weekly, "It tells the true - life story of a Scotsman who took up residence in the Cocos Islands, at that time unclaimed by any nation; challenged Alexander Hare, the self-appointed sultan of the Islands, for control; applied to the British Government for official protection. His son was appointed by Britain to govern the Islands, and today the fifth John Ross rules there as hereditary Governor."

According to Wireless Weekly, the play was "based on many versions, both official and unofficial, of the conflict between Ross and Alexander Hare, for sovereignty of the islands where John Ross the Fifth now reigns as hereditary governor. Hare was a governor of Borneo, who had to give up his position when the Dutch bought the island from Britain. Having any amount of money, he set himself up on the Cocos-Keeling group of islands, with a harem of eighty-four dancing girls, and slaves, and orchestra. Ross was appointed his trading partner. But Ross, being a monogamous. God-fearing Scot soon quarrelled, and lived with his wife on an adjacent island. A curious situation arose. Ross performing the marriage ceremony for members of Hare’s harem, who escaped with sailors and swam across to Ross’s island."
