= Shire of Cocos (Keeling) Islands =

Cocos (Keeling) Islands Shire Council
- Seats: 7

Shire of Cocos (Keeling) Islands
- Local government area
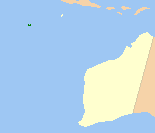
- Location of the coast of Western Australia

- Interactive map of Shire of Cocos (Keeling) Islands
- Country: Australia
- State: Australia
- Region: External territory of Australia
- Council seat: Home Island

Government
  - Mayor: Mohammed Isa Minkom (Shire President)
  - Federal division: Lingiari

Area
  - Total: 14.1 km^{2} (5.4 sq mi)

Population
  - Total: 593 (LGA 2021)
- Website: Shire of Cocos (Keeling) Islands

The Shire of Cocos (Keeling) Islands is a local government area which manages local affairs on the Australian external territory of Cocos (Keeling) Islands (12°07′S 96°54′E; post code: 6799). The island is grouped with Western Australia but is administered by the Department of Infrastructure, Regional Development and Cities and an Administrator.

The Shire covers an area of 14.1 km^{2} (5.4 sq mi) in the Indian Ocean, about 2,770 km (1,720 mi) north-west of Perth and 1,000 km (620 mi) south-west of Java in Indonesia. The current shire president is Mohammed Isa Minkom, who is serving a four-year term from 2023-2027.

== History ==
From the 19th century onwards, the islands were owned by the Clunies-Ross family, and in 1886 were granted to them in perpetuity by Queen Victoria. On 23 November 1955 the islands were transferred to Australian control under the Cocos (Keeling) Islands Act 1955. In 1978, Australia entered a form of purchase of the islands with the Clunies-Ross family, and the Cocos (Keeling) Islands Council came into existence in July 1979 as a representative of the Cocos Malay community.

== Administration ==
The islands' administrator is also the administrator of Christmas Island. These two Territories comprise Australia's Indian Ocean Territories. The Australian Government provides Commonwealth-level government services through the Indian Ocean Territories Administration and the Department of Infrastructure, Regional Development and Cities. As per the Federal Government's Territories Law Reform Act 1992, which came into force on 1 July 1992, Western Australian laws are applied to the Cocos Islands, "so far as they are capable of applying in the Territory"; non-application or partial application of such laws is at the discretion of the federal government. The Act also gives Western Australian courts judicial power over the islands. The Cocos (Keeling) Islands remain constitutionally distinct from Western Australia, however; the power of the state to legislate for the territory is a power delegated by the federal government. The kind of services typically provided by a state government elsewhere in Australia are provided by departments of the Western Australian Government, and by contractors, with the costs met by the federal government.

There also exists a unicameral Cocos (Keeling) Islands Shire Council with seven seats. A full-term lasts four years, though elections are held every two years; approximately half the members retire each two years, alternating elections of three and four members for a total of seven. The first elections to the Shire Council, established by ordinance, were held in May 1993. The shire has seven councillors and no wards.

The Shire's offices are at Jalan Bunga Kangkong, Home Island.

Federally, Cocos (Keeling) Islanders form the electorate of Lingiari with Christmas Island and outback Northern Territory.

== Members ==
There are currently seven council members, including one member serving as Shire President and another as Deputy Shire President.

Name	Office	Term
Aindil Minkom	Shire President	2021-2025
Isa Minkom	Deputy Shire President	2023-2027
Ayesha Young	Councillor	2021-2025
Tony Lacy	Councillor	2021-2025
Signa Knight	Councillor	2023-2025
Osman Sloan	Councillor	2023-2027
Azah Badlu	Councillor	2023-2027

=== 2023 election results ===
2023 Western Australian local elections: Cocos (Keeling) Islands
Party	Candidate	Votes	%	±%
Independent	Mohammed Isa Minkom (elected)	66	44.00	
Independent	Azah Badlu (elected)	49	32.67	
Independent	Osman Sloan (elected)	13	8.67	
Independent	Chloe Sykes	9	6.00	
Independent	Singa Knight (elected)	8	5.33	
Independent	Lofty Raptikan	5	3.33	
Total formal votes		150	93.17	
Informal votes		11	6.83	
Turnout		161	40.55	

== List of shire presidents ==
No.	Name	Entered office	Left office
1	Ron Grant	1993	1995
2	Radal bin Feyrel	1995	1999
3	Mohammad Said Chongkin	1999	2001
(1)	Ron Grant	2001	2007
(3)	Mohammad Said Chongkin	October 2007	2009
4	Shane Charlston	2009	October 2009
5	Balmut Pirus	October 2009	2011
6	Aindil Minkom	2011	2015
(5)	Balmut Pirus	2015	2017
7	Seri Wati Iku	2017	2019
(6)	Aindil Minkom	23 October 2019	Incumbent
