= Oceania House =

Historic house in Cocos Islands of Australia

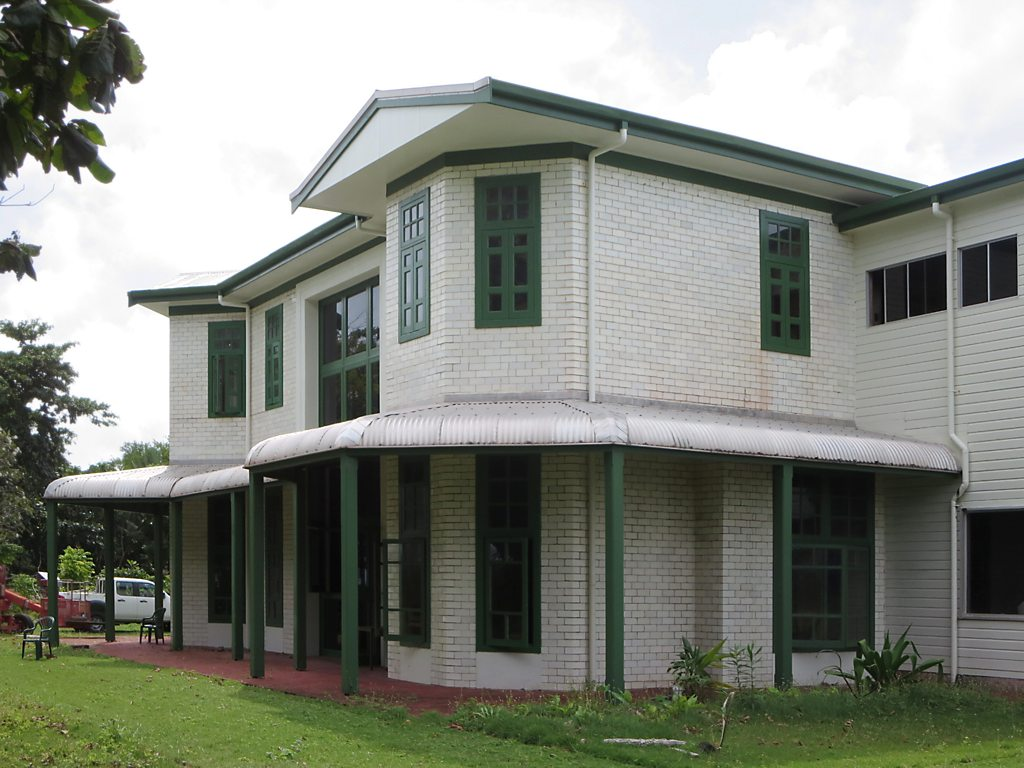
- Oceania House, 2015

- Location within Cocos (Keeling) Islands
- Location in the Cocos (Keeling) Islands

General information
- Status: Completed
- Type: House
- Architectural style: Federation
- Location: Jalan Bunga Kangkong, Home Island, Cocos (Keeling) Islands, Australia
- Coordinates: 12.1204°S 96.8947°E
- Construction started: 1887
- Completed: 1904
- Renovated: 1909; 1981
- Client: Clunies-Ross family

Technical details
- Material: Brick; weatherboard cladding; timber
- Floor count: 2
- Floor area: 930 square metres (10,000 sq ft)

Design and construction
- Architect: George Clunies Ross

Commonwealth Heritage List
- Official name: Oceania House and Surrounds
- Type: Listed place (Historic)
- Designated: 22 June 2004
- Reference no.: 105236

Oceania House is a heritage-listed house at Jalan Bunga Kangkong, Home Island, Cocos (Keeling) Islands, Australia. It was added to the Australian Commonwealth Heritage List on 22 June 2004.

== History ==
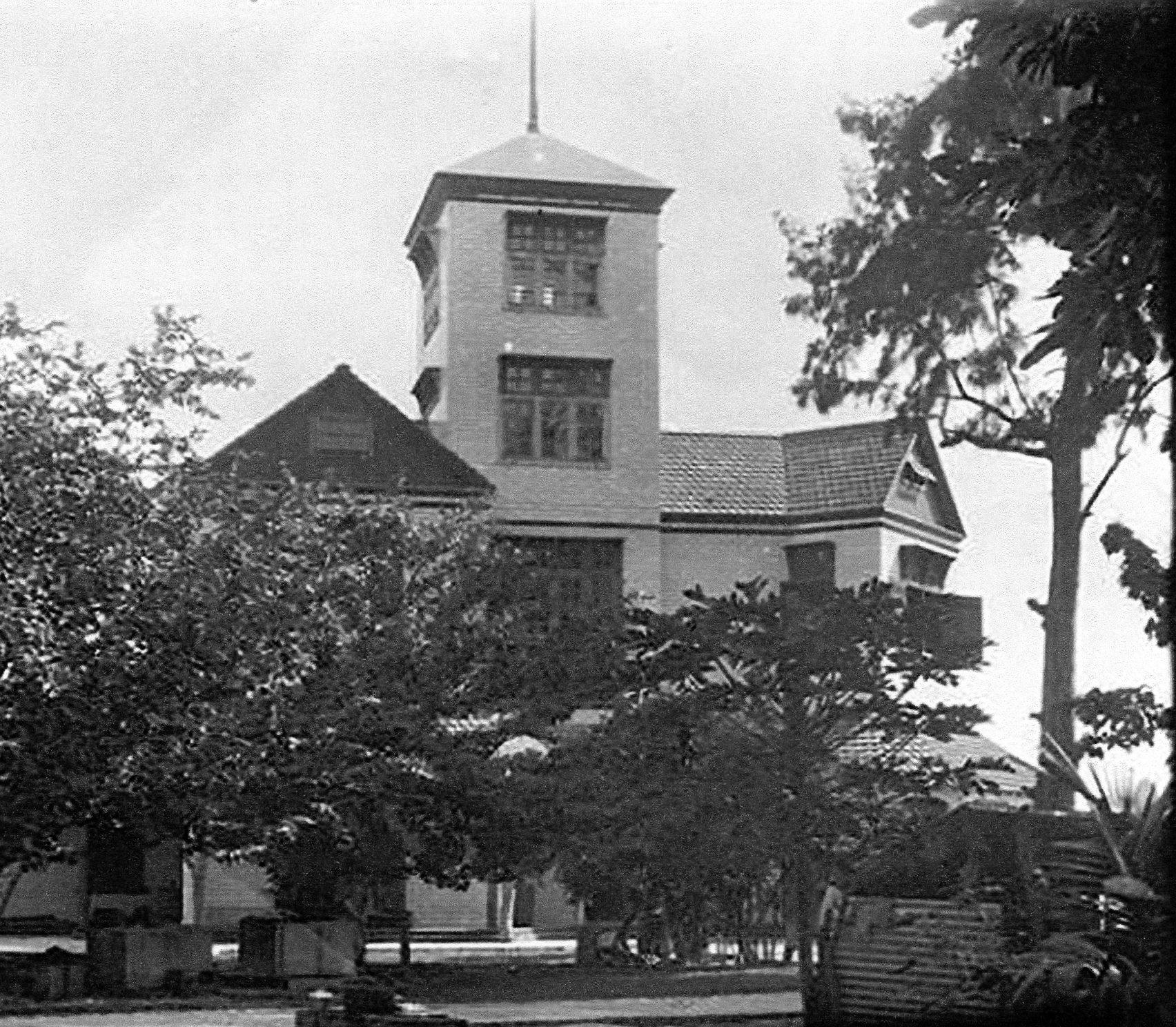
Oceania House, undated

Oceania House is the historic residence of the Clunies-Ross family, who settled the Cocos Islands in 1827 and established its coconut/copra industry. (The Islands were first settled by Alexander Hare in 1826; he left in 1831.) The copra industry was always the main economic activity; it declined in the post-World War II years and ceased in 1987. The present Cocos-Malay community, who live on Home Island adjacent to the Clunies-Ross estate, are the descendants of labourers brought to the islands by the Clunies-Ross family to work the coconut plantations. The whole of the Cocos Islands were granted to George Clunies-Ross in 1886. In 1951 the Commonwealth of Australia bought land on West Island for an airfield. In 1978 Australia bought the rest of the islands (except Oceania House) from John Cecil Clunies-Ross and transferred them to the Cocos community. Clunies-Ross retained Lot 14 until 1990.

Oceania House was built between 1887 and 1904 using local labour, with bricks imported from Scotland. Soil for the grounds was shipped from Christmas Island. It was severely damaged by a cyclone in 1909. It underwent substantial renovations in the 1940s, including the removal of a tower. In 1951, it was described as a "ten-bedroomed mansion with four bathrooms, a ballroom, billiard-room, and ten acres of garden". Oceania House hosted a "garden party" for Queen Elizabeth II during the 1954 Australian royal visit.

It has been variously altered and extended in subsequent years and was extensively altered and renovated by John Cecil Clunies-Ross senior in 1980–1981. The family lived there until the departure of J. C. Clunies-Ross in 1985. He was declared bankrupt in 1986 after a failed investment and the bankruptcy trustees took possession in 1988 before putting it up for sale in 1991. In 1992, while awaiting the sale, John George Clunies-Ross junior was living in the bungalow on the property and operating the mansion for tourists.

It was sold to the Australian Government for $1.2 million in 1993 to be turned over to the Shire of Cocos, but saw indecision about its use through the mid-1990s; in 1999 it was reported to have laid dormant for six years while hotel proposals had not proceeded. In 2000, it was put up for sale again, as neither the Australian Government nor the local community had the money to maintain it. It was later sold to Lloyd Leist, "a former taxi driver from Perth, Western Australia", and was not open to the public for several years. By 2017 it was again being used for tourist accommodation.

== Description ==
=== Oceania House ===
This is a two-story house of approximately 550 square metres (5,900 sq ft) in the older part and approximately 380 square metres (4,100 sq ft) in a recent weatherboard clad addition on the south side. Construction is cavity walls of cream brick imported from Scotland, with a corrugated iron roof. The main two store portion is almost square, with the elevations relieved by projecting corner bays; it is almost surrounded by a bull nose veranda on can feed timber posts (this replaced a former straight pitched veranda on iron pipe columns, presumably as part of the 1980–1981 renovations). Externally the building is generally austere and makes little reference to any orthodox architectural style of the time, perhaps due to the owner's isolation from the Australian mainstream and/or because of later alterations; however there is a modest Federation style influence in the projecting corner bays and the multi-paned windows with small pane toplights. Many of the openings have proportions unusual for the early twentieth century and may be the result of later alteration. The interiors were extensively renovated in 1980–1981. Brick internal walls were panelled in teak and the original bastard teak staircase was replaced with a modern design in West Australian jarrah. At this time a tower was removed. There is a single-story brick wing with hipped corrugated iron roof on the east side and a large weatherboard clad two storey wing (apparently about twenty years old) on the south side. In recent years the house has been used as tourist accommodation.

=== Old school house ===
This was built in the early twentieth century as the Clunies-Ross estate office. It was later used as the school house and is now used for storage and tourist accommodation. It is a two-storey building of brick in an unusual decorative bond similar to Flemish bond but apparently using narrow brickbats in place of headers. The gabled roof is of corrugated iron without gutters, with sheet cladding to the gable ends. There is a simple two storey timber verandah on the north side and traces of a former two storey verandah on the south side. On the south side a row of ground floor doors and two pairs of upper French doors, have been partly bricked up to make windows. The ground floor is used for storage and the upper floor has been refurbished for use as tourist units with self-contained bathrooms.

=== Former workshop and store ===
Located next to the Old School House on its west side, this is a long single storey gabled brick building apparently about sixty to eighty years old. It has a concrete floor and a metal roof. It is now disused.

=== Second former school building ===
Situated immediately east of the Old School House, this is a simple rectangular building apparently about thirty years old, consisting of concrete stumps, timber frame and floor, asbestos cement sheet cladding and metal roof. It is used for storage.

=== Garden shed ===
This is located some distance towards the northern boundary of the fenced and walled Oceania House part of the lot. It is a simple rectangular building apparently about ten to fifteen years old, with timber frame, concrete floor, fibrous sheet cladding and aluminium decramastic on top of the roof.

=== Grounds ===
Much of the grounds has been landscaped and planted with a wide range of tropical and temperate plants and trees:

- There are fresh water wells and rich soil brought from Christmas Island; other parts preserve indigenous vegetation including large ironwood trees;
- There are a number of bores in varying states of repair;
- A rainwater tank of approximately 220 imperial gallons (1,000 L; 260 US gal);
- A large brick bird loft which appears to be less than ten years old;
- A concrete or stone edged drive leading from the north-west corner of the Oceania House part of the property to the house.;
- A Celtic Cross marks the graves of several members of the Clunies-Ross family
- Remains of wall: this was built in about 1870 to protect the family from Javanese labourers It appears to have several different builds, typically of English bond brick 34 centimetres (13.5 in) thick with plain coping; but parts have decorative rendered coping; parts are badly fretted or collapsed while about a quarter of it has completely disappeared or is visible only from ground level traces.

=== Oceania House contents ===
The library of Oceania House contains many valuable books and estate records, including births, deaths and marriages records. The original wooden plaque commemorating the 1857 annexation of the Territory by Great Britain, as well as bronze busts of the first four Clunies-Ross kings of Cocos, are in the house. (1988 information).

=== Bungalow ===
The Bungalow part of the property has the following features:

1. The bungalow: this was built as a manager's house and appears to be about twenty-five to thirty years old. It is a simple timber-framed building with fibrous sheet external cladding, hardboard internal linings, concrete floors and corrugated asbestos roof;
2. Powerhouse: the building is ten to fifteen years old and is built of cream brick in stretcher bond with draped brick sills, corrugated iron roof and fibrous sheet gable fascia;
3. Outbuildings: between and near the Bungalow and the powerhouse there are three simple sheds, apparently about fifteen to twenty-five years old, of timber-frame construction with fibrous sheet cladding;
4. Grounds: there are several bores, two rainwater tanks and a small sandbag jetty opposite the bungalow.

=== Condition ===
Oceania House is in generally good condition, but the records in the library are at risk of damage from dust, dirt, mould and humidity. The brick outbuildings are in fair condition showing rising damp. The Bungalow and other outbuildings are in generally fair to good condition. The boundary wall is in fair to poor condition, with parts collapsed or badly fretted. Some of the moveable heritage has been removed from the house.

== Heritage listing ==
Historically the property is significant because of the evidence of its continuous occupation by the Clunies-Ross family since soon after they settled the Cocos Islands in 1827 and established its copra industry. It includes the remains of the security wall built in 1870, the graves of several family members and historic records associated with the Cocos settlement. The large house and spacious grounds present a great contrast to the nearby Malay Kampong and signify the status of the plantation owner and his dominant position over the Cocos-Malay community (Cocos Malays worked as servants in the house until quite recent times). Oceania House is of interest architecturally: it has an idiosyncratic style and detailing, possibly reflecting the isolation of the owners from the mainstream of British and Australian taste of the time. The property is held in high esteem by the Cocos Malay community because of its importance to their history and society.
