= Direction Island, Cocos (Keeling) Islands =

Coordinates: 12°05′16″S 096°52′55″E

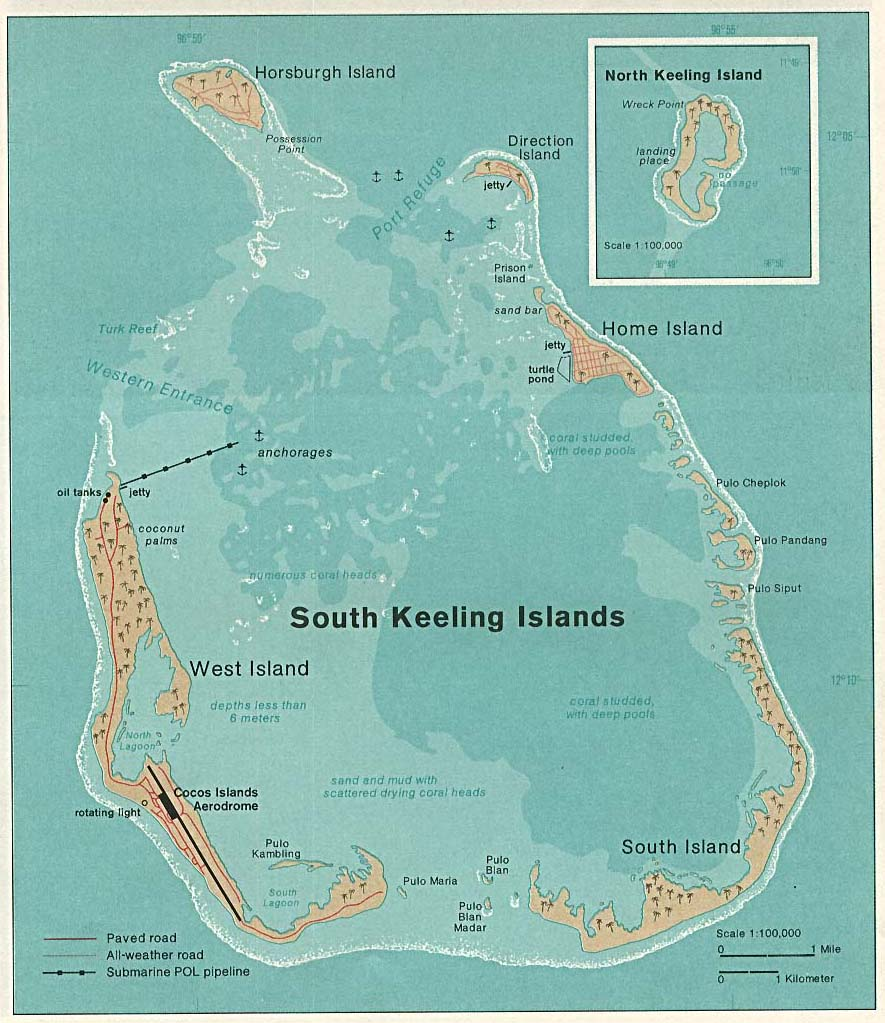
Map of Cocos (Keeling) Islands in the Indian Ocean

Direction Island (Cocos Islands Malay: Pulu Tikus, lit. 'Mouse Island') is located in the Cocos (Keeling) Islands group. It is the northeasternmost of the South Keeling Islands.

A slipway and tank associated with the flying boat and sea rescue presence on the island in the early twentieth century are listed on the Australian Commonwealth Heritage List.
