= Home Island =

Island of the Cocos (Keeling) Islands, Australia

Pulu Selma (Cocos Islands Malay)
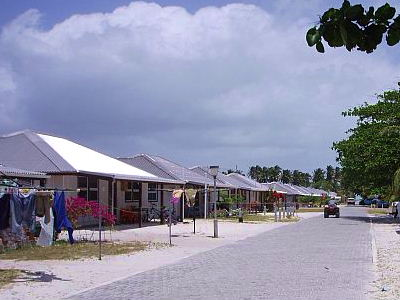

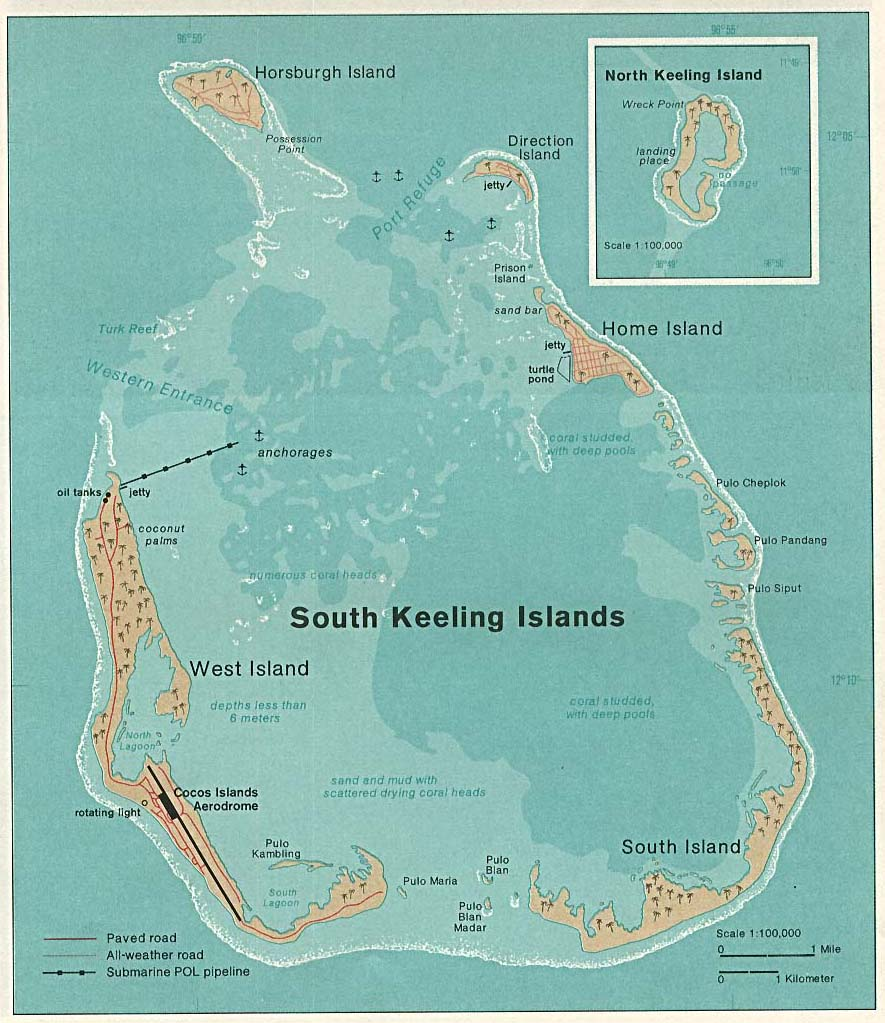
- Map of the Cocos (Keeling) Islands

- Location within Cocos (Keeling) Islands

Geography
- Coordinates: 12.1178°S 96.8975°E
- Archipelago: South Keeling Islands
- Area: 95 ha (230 acres)

Administration
- Australia
- Territory: Cocos (Keeling) Islands
- Largest settlement: Bantam

Demographics
- Population: 448 (2021)

Additional information
- Time zone: UTC+06:30

Home Island (Cocos Islands Malay: Pulu Selma) is the most populous of only two permanently-inhabited islands of the 26 islands of the South Keeling Islands of the Cocos (Keeling) Islands, an Australian external territory in the central-eastern Indian Ocean. The island contains the largest settlement of the territory, Bantam.

== Description ==
It is 95 hectares (230 acres) in area and is home to about 500 Cocos Malay people in the village of Bantam. Local attractions include a museum covering local culture and traditions, flora and fauna, Australian naval history, and the early owners of the Cocos-Keeling Islands. Bantam was formerly listed as the capital of the Cocos (Keeling) Islands by the European Union, until it was changed to West Island in 2012.

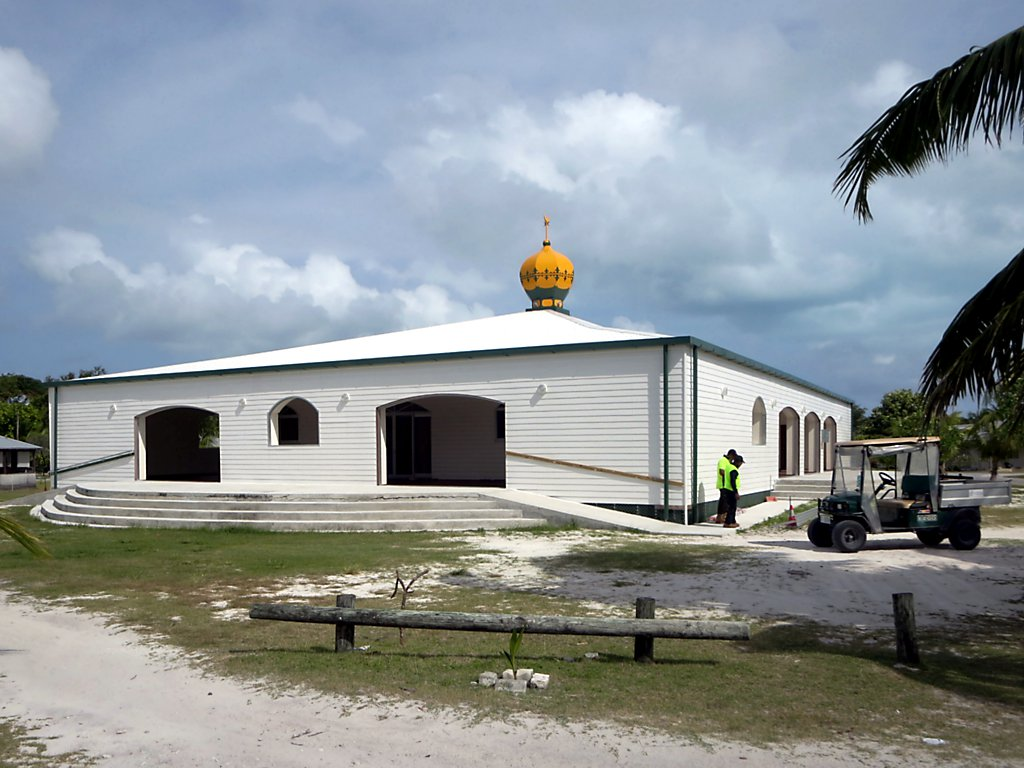
Home Island Mosque

The Home Island Mosque is one of the busiest places on the island, and the minaret is painted in territorial flag colours of green and gold.

There is also a trail leading to Oceania House, which was the ancestral home of the Clunies-Ross family, the former rulers of the Cocos-Keeling Islands and is over a century old.

== History ==
Alexander Hare and Robert Clunies-Ross established the first settlement on Home Island in 1826, with a group of slaves Cluines-Ross brought. In 1831, Cluines-Ross gained control over the island after Hare left for Batavia due to his financial problems. In 1836, Cluines-Ross went to Mauritius to seek British annexation. George Clunies-Ross and his descendants were granted the island by Queen Victoria in 1886.

27 houses on the island were destroyed by bombings in 1944.

== Education ==
Cocos Islands District High School operates a primary education centre on Home Island; most of the staff live on West Island and travel to their jobs on a daily basis. Secondary level students go to the West Island campus.

== Heritage listings ==
Home Island contains a number of heritage-listed sites, including:

- Captain Ballard's Grave
- Jalan Kipas: Early Settlers' Graves
- Home Island Cemetery
- Jalan Panti: Home Island Foreshore
- Jalan Bunga Mawar: Home Island Industrial Precinct
- Jalan Bunga Kangkong: Oceania House
- Jalan Bunga Mawar: Old Co-Op Shop
