= Cocos Malays =

Ethnic group in Asia

Cocos Malays Melayu Kokos
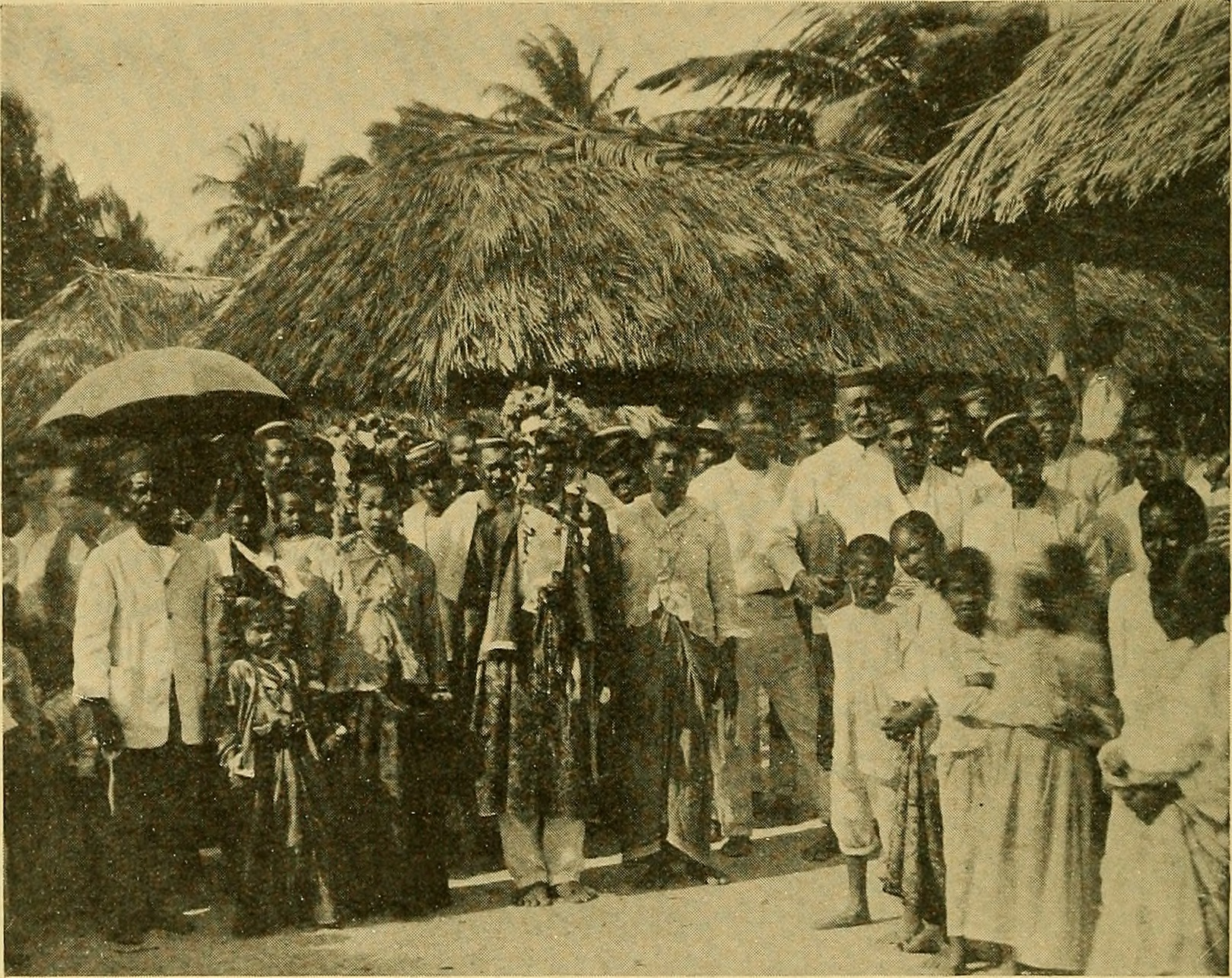
- A Malay bride and bridegroom as seen in a wedding event in the Cocos (Keeling) Islands, 1912.

Total population
- 4,000–5,000

Regions with significant populations
- Malaysia (Sabah): ~5,000; Australia (Cocos (Keeling) Islands): 400

Languages
- Cocos Malay, English and Malaysian

Religion
- Islam (mostly Sunni)

Related ethnic groups
- Bantenese, Betawi people, Javanese people, Malays

The Cocos Malays are the majority ethnic group of the Cocos (Keeling) Islands territory of Australia. Today, many of the Cocos Malays can be found on the eastern coast of Sabah, Malaysia, because of diaspora originating from the 1950s during the British colonial period. There are also established diaspora communities in Western Australia, particularly in Broome, Geraldton, Kalgoorlie, Katanning, Perth and Port Hedland.

Despite that they all have assimilated into the ethnic Malay culture, they are named in reference to the Malay race, originating from different places of the Malay Archipelago such as Bali, Bima, Celebes, Madura, Sumbawa, Timor, Sumatra, Pasir-Kutai, Malacca, Penang, Batavia, and Cirebon, as well as South Africa and New Guinea.

== History ==
=== Colonisation and governance ===
The first Malays are believed to have arrived and settled in the Islands in 1826, "when Alexander Hare, an English merchant, brought his Malay harem and slaves there." In 1827 John Clunies-Ross changed the lives of the Malay slaves when he settled the Islands with his family. The existing Malays and a large number of newly arrived Malay immigrants that Clunies-Ross brought with him were employed to assist with the harvesting of coconuts for copra. People from British Malaya and the Dutch East Indies as well as South Africa and New Guinea were brought in by Hare and by Clunies-Ross as indentured workers, slaves or convicts.

In September 1978, the Australian government forced the Clunies-Ross family to sell the Cocos Islands to them. Since then, the Chief of State has been the Monarch of Australia, represented by the current Administrator, Natasha Griggs. The President of the Islands Council is Aindil Minkom.

The descendants of the people brought to the islands by Hare and Clunies Ross are as of 2019 seeking recognition from the Australian Federal Government to be acknowledged as Indigenous Australians.

=== Cocos Malays in Malaysia ===
The Cocos Malays in Malaysia primarily reside in several villages known as Kampung Cocos in the towns of Lahad Datu and Tawau, both located in Tawau Division of Sabah state. Originally from the Cocos Islands, they settled on this area in the 1950s after being brought back by the British. The number of those who participated in the first emigration is thought to be around twenty, but it increased when they expanded their settlement in Lahad Datu. Their culture is closely related to the Malay peoples in Malaysia and their current population in Sabah is around 4,000, about eight times larger than the population remaining in the Cocos Islands. They are accorded bumiputra status by the Malaysian government and also a part of the Malaysian Malays ethnic group found in the state of Sabah.

== Religion ==
In the 2021 Australian census, 65.6% of the population of the Cocos (Keeling) Islands reported Islam as their religion, while 14.0% reported no religion and 3.5% identified as Catholic or Anglican; a further 15.3% did not state a religion.

== Dress code ==
The Cocos Malays have their own dress code — Baju Kebaya for the women and Baju Melayu for the men. Baju Kebaya consists of a loose tunic (which refers to a long collarless shirt with a short neckline that is pinned together with a brooch) and is worn over a skirt or sarong. Baju Melayu is a loose shirt (either with a collar with three or more buttons or collarless with a neckline). The Baju Kebaya and Baju Melayu of the Cocos are indistinct of the attire of typical Malay. The dress of the community is believed to be a blend of several cultures: the Javanese, the Scottish, and the English.

== Language ==
Cocos Malays have their own language variety, which is called Basa Pulu Kokos. The language is predominantly Betawi Malay, a Jakarta creole mix of Malay and Indonesian (as well as Javanese, Sundanese in which the Betawi language derived from) with local pronunciation and elements of English and Scots being mixed in.

=== Phrases/vocabulary ===
- Selamat pagi – Good morning
- Selamat ténggah hari – Good Afternoon
- Selamat soré – Evening
- Selamat malam – Good Night
- Apa Kabar? – How are you?
- Kerangkeng – Food closet
- Ke kaca – Cute
- Kenes – Cute
- Baik – Good
- Jumpa lagi – See you later (See you again)
- Korsi – Chair (in Standard Malay, Kursi or Kerusi)
- Dostor – Doctor (in Standard Malay, Doktor)
- Esbok – Fridge (from English "icebox")
- Bok – Box (in Standard Malay, Kotak)
- Epel – Apple (in Standard Malay, epal or apel)
- Jukong – Cocos Malay boat (Junk ship came from this)
- Gue – Me (Derived from Betawi Malay)
- Loh – You (Derived from Betawi Malay)
- Cimni – Chimney (from English)
- Kot – Coat (from English)
- Hiju/Hijo – Green (in Standard Malay, hijau)
- Kalo – if (in Standard Malay, kalau)
- Emak/Mak – Mother (used to address females with children)
- Pak/Ayah – Father (First term used to address males with children. Second term is father)
- Paman/Man – Uncle (used to address males without children)
- Bibik – Aunty (that is younger than the parent)
- Nek/Nenek – grandma (used to address grandparents of any sex)
- Wak – respectful term to address woman with teenage children
- Oh tuhan ku! – Oh my god!

Addressing elders:

- If Yusri is a teenager, then Mak Yusri (mother of Yusri) becomes Wak Yusri.
- When Yusri who is now Man Yusri, has a child called Mustafa, Wak Yusri becomes Nek Mustafa and Man Yusri becomes Pak Mustafa.
- If Mustafa who is Man Mustafa and a teenager, has a child called Budi, then Pak Mustafa becomes Nek Budi.

== See also ==
- Culture of the Cocos (Keeling) Islands
- Malay Australian
