= Cocos Malay =

Malay based-creole

Cocos Islands Malay
- Basa Pulu Kokos
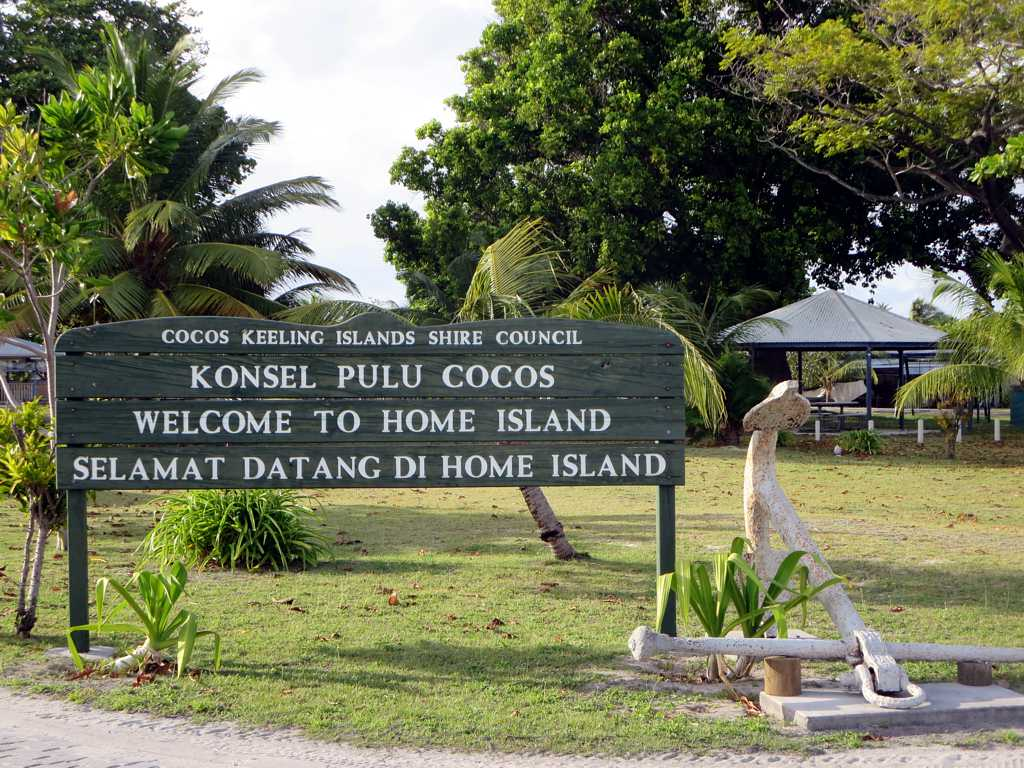
- A welcome sign on Home Island featuring Cocos Malay. Note the use of the Betawi standard form "di" instead of the common Malay "ke" to indicate location.
- Native to: Australia, Malaysia
- Region: Cocos (Keeling) Islands, Sabah
- Ethnicity: 4,000 in Malaysia (2000)
- Native speakers: (1,100 in Australia cited 1987–2012)
- Language family: Creole: Malay-based creole; Betawi; Cocos Islands Malay
- Writing system: Latin (Malay alphabet)

Language codes
- ISO 639-3: coa
- Glottolog: coco1260
- ELP: Cocos Islands Malay
- Percentage of people in each Australian Bureau of Statistics (ABS) statistical area 1 (SA1) of the Cocos (Keeling) Islands (left) and Christmas Island (right) who reported speaking Malay at home in the 2021 census. Under 10% (West Island only) 10-20% 20-30% 30-40% Over 70% (Bantam only) Uninhabited

Cocos Malay is a post-creolised variety of Malay, spoken by the Cocos Malays who predominantly inhabit the Cocos (Keeling) Islands and Christmas Island region which is a part/territory of Australia. Apart from Australia, this language is also spoken by the diaspora of Cocos Malay descendants in Sabah, Malaysia.

Linguistically, Cocos Malay derives from the Malay trade languages of the 19th century, specifically the Betawi language, with influences from Javanese and Sundanese. Malay is offered as a second language in schools, and Malaysian has prestige status; both are influencing the language, bringing it more in line with standard Malay.

There is also a growing influence of English, considering the Islands having been an Australian territory and globalization drifting modern terms into the daily parlance. In 2009, Cocos Malay students were prohibited from using their own language and failure to comply resulted in punishment in the form of "speaking tickets" which meant that they were required to carry out cleaning duties in school. However, this form of language restriction ended by 2011.

== History ==
A bilingual give way sign used on the Cocos (Keeling) Islands, in both English and Cocos Malay. It differs from the give way signs used in Malaysia.

The first Cocos Malays were slaves brought to the then uninhabited Cocos (Keeling) Islands in 1826 by Alexander Hare and John Clunies-Ross. Most Malay slaves were mainly obtained in Malacca and in Banjarmasin, but they originally came from all over Indonesia, and the language that they spoke among each other was a form of Malay. Given that Malay was the lingua franca or trade language throughout Maritime Southeast Asia at the time, it is likely that the slaves spoke some form of pidgin Malay. Between 1857 and 1910 the Clunies-Ross family also brought in a large number of Javanese labourers from Banten, Central Java, and Madura. The Java Islanders labourers were called "Bantamese" to distinguish them from the Malays who had previously inhabited the island. Nowadays, the native language spoken by their ancestors has largely been lost in the Cocos (Keeling) Islands, although some words have entered the Cocos Malay.

Over time, Cocos Malay appears to be very vulnerable considering that the number of Cocos Malay speakers is only around 500 people. In the 1950s, due to economic difficulties, many Cocos Malay-speaking people emigrated to Christmas Island and Sabah, Malaysia. Emigration continued in the 1970s, when Cocos Islanders began migrating to the Australian mainland, with one-way tickets (in accordance with Clunies-Ross's policy at the time that they were free to go but not free to return). Due to ongoing migration, the Cocos Malay speakers reside in cities across Western Australia, including Perth, Katanning, Geraldton, Kalgoorlie, and Port Hedland.

In 2009, Cocos Malay was banned from use in the education sector in the Cocos (Keeling) Islands because it was considered not in accordance with the rules of language politeness, and instead used Indonesian as the language of instruction which is considered by the Malays as a standard variant of Malay. However, the ban on the use of Cocos Malay did not last long and was finally able to be used normally again in 2011.

== Characteristics ==
It has the following characteristics:

- Javanese influence: cucut 'shark', kates 'papaya', walikat 'shoulderblade' etc.
- Hokkien-derived first-person and second-person singular gua and lu.
- Causative marker kasi.
- Progressive particle ada.
- Possessive marker punya.
- The third person indefinite form ong derived from orang 'person'

Cocos Malay exhibits lexical items and Dutch loanwords that are common in Indonesian and Betawi (Jakartan Malay) but rarely used in Malay. Therefore, Cocos Malay is considered to be a Malay-derived creole derived from Betawi, although Cocos Malay does not have strucutual features in common with Betawi as -a change to -è and transitive suffix -in.

== Vocabulary ==
Cocos Malay has strong influences from three languages: Malay, Javanese, and Betawi. Some examples of words in Cocos Malay include:

1. cucut (from Javanese: ꦕꦸꦕꦸꦠ꧀, romanized: cucut, lit. 'shark')
2. kates (from Javanese: ꦏꦠꦺꦱ꧀, romanized: katès, lit. 'papaya')
3. walikat (from Javanese: ꦮꦭꦶꦏꦠ꧀, romanized: walikat, lit. 'shoulder blade')
4. ong (from Javanese: ꦮꦺꦴꦁ, romanized: wong, lit. 'person', used as an indefinite third-person pronoun: its usage is similar to that in Betawi language, Javanese language, and Indonesian language.
5. gua (from Betawi language, used as a first-person pronoun) (Note: the word gua in Betawi language itself is a loanword from Hokkien, which is part of the Chinese language family.)
6. lu (from Betawi language, used as a second-person pronoun) (Note: the word "lu" in Betawi language itself is a loanword from Hokkien.)
7. kasi (from Betawi language, meaning 'give', used as a causative verb)
8. melendot (from Betawi language, meaning 'to cling'; to continuously hold onto someone)
9. ledes (from Betawi language, meaning 'abrasion' or 'scrape')
10. pulas (from Betawi language, meaning 'deep sleep')
11. ngaco (from Betawi language, meaning 'nonsense' or 'random talk')
12. sore (a word found in both Javanese and Betawi)
13. kuping (a word found in both Javanese and Betawi)
14. capek (a word found in both Javanese and Betawi)
15. gampang (a word found in both Javanese and Betawi)
16. ada* (from Malay, used as a progressive particle)
17. punya* (from Malay, used as a possessive verb)
18. siang* (from Malay)
19. kamu (from Malay)
20. saya* (from Malay)
21. mengapa (from Malay)
22. malam* (from Malay)
23. pagi* (from Malay)
24. di mana* (from Malay)
25. ke mana* (from Malay)
26. siapa* (from Malay)
27. bagaimana (from Malay)
28. tidak (from Malay)
29. orang* (from Malay)
30. hilang* (from Malay)
31. hendak (from Malay)
32. mau* (from Malay)

Note: "*" indicates words that exist in both Malay and Betawi.

== Phonology ==
=== Vowels ===
Vowels Table
	Front	Central	Back
High	i		u
Mid	e	ə	o
Low		a	

=== Consonants ===
Consonants Table
	Bilabial	Dental	Alveolar	Post- alveolar	Palatal	Velar	Uvular	Glottal
Plosive & affricate	p b	t̪	d	tʃ dʒ		k g		(ʔ)
Nasal	m		n		ɲ	ŋ		
Fricative			s				ʁ	(h)^{2}
Approximant	w				j			
Lateral approximant			l					

There are three ways in which Cocos Malay differs from Standard Malay and Indonesian:

1. The uvular [ʁ] which always occurs intervocalically is present in Coco Malay but not in Standard Malay or Indonesian.
2. Certain consonants, [f v ʃ z], which occur in Standard Malay are not present in Cocos Malay.
3. With regard to the [h] amongst the three languages, the [h] in Cocos Malay is often dropped, especially in word-initial position. Examples include:

Standard Malay	Cocos Malay	English Gloss
[ˈhisap˺]	[ˈisap˺]	'suck'
[ˈhuta̪ n]	[ˈuta̪ n]	'forest'
[ˈhiduŋ]	[ˈiduŋ]	'nose'
[ˈhaus]	[ˈaus]	'thirsty'

== Sample text ==
Cocos Malay:

Saban minggu orang tu kərja'an presa tu, raun tu. Kalo' aer kring bole mənyəbərang, aer bəsar bole bawa' jukung tu, ame' məngkali ada yu masu', ganggu nang di dalam situ tu, bunu tu. Itu macam-macam ikan ada situ tu. Emang dia punya pintu dua, jukung bole masu' emangnya.

Spoken Suburban Betawi (Ora Batavian):

Saban minggu tuh orang gawéannya meréksain ntu, ngider-ngiderin ntu. Kalo aér asat, bisa nyebrang; kalo aér naék, bisa naék perahu ntu. Ama kali baé ada hiu ngasup, ngerécokin nyang di dalem situ, dibunuh baé. Ntu ikan macem-macem juga ada di situ. Pantonya ada dua, perahu gé bisa ngasup.

English:

"Every week people would go and check them, they would go on a round. At low tide one could walk over, at high tide one could take a boat, in order to take out or to kill, say, a shark, who had come into the pond and was disturbing the turtles and fish inside. Because there used to be all sorts of fishes in there. There were in fact two gates: boats could come in."
