= Alexander Hare =

English colonialist merchant and politician (1775–1834)

- Born: 1775; London
- Died: 2 November 1834 (aged 58–59); Bencoolen
- Occupation: Merchant
- Known for: Polygamy; attempts at founding settlements near Banjarmasin on the island of Borneo and the Cocos-Keeling Islands

Alexander Hare (1775–1834) was an English colonialist merchant and politician, infamous for his polygamy.

According to British anthropologist Nigel Barley, "what gives Hare his enduring notoriety 200 years later is his possession of a large, multi-ethnic harem of slave women".

Hare is also known for his attempts at founding settlements in Maluka near Banjarmasin on the island of Borneo and the Cocos-Keeling Islands. Following "his brief appointment as the Commissioner of Borneo," he had a harem of 40, sometimes reported as 100, enslaved women, mostly of Malay ancestry.

== Malacca ==
Alexander Hare was born in London in 1775. The son of Janet (last name unknown) and Mr. Hare, a London watchmaker, Alexander joined a trading company in Portugal around 1800.

He moved to Calcutta, and settled as a merchant in Malacca in 1807. Among the places he traded to was Banjarmasin, on the southern coast of Borneo. Banjarmasin had a Dutch trading post, but it was abandoned in 1809 due to British naval hostilities. The Sultan, seeking a replacement for the Dutch, and having developed a good relationship with Hare, asked him to establish a British trading post. But Hare was cautious and waited until his own interests converged with the rising star of Stamford Raffles of the British East India Company (EIC) before acting. Hare had first met Raffles when the latter stopped in Malacca in 1807 and 1808 on sick-leave from Penang. A few years later, when Dutch control briefly passed to Britain (1811–16) and the EIC, Raffles, as the newly appointed Lieutenant Governor of Java, acting on Hare's request made him Resident of Banjarmasin and Commissioner of the Island of Borneo.

== Banjarmasin ==
Eventually arriving in Banjarmasin in 1812, Hare negotiated a treaty with the Sultan on behalf of the Company. The Sultan also granted him 1,400 square miles of land for his own use. This grant stretched along the coast from the mouth of the Barito River to Tanjong Selatan and inland to the north up to the Sungei Matapura. This was mostly marshland mixed with areas of grassland and some forest. A number of villages sheltered on or near the coast. Although it was technically against EIC policy for its employees to accept large gifts of land, Raffles acquiesced in order to reward Hare for his services in expanding British influence in the region. Hare established his estate as an independent polity, Maluka, which issued its own coinage, possessed its own flag and levied custom duties. Being mostly absent from his estate, Hare hired John Clunies Ross first as a ship captain in 1813 and in 1816 as overseer of the settlement. Ross was instructed to clear land for rice, sugar, coffee and pepper and build a new trading boat. He was also to build a salt works and defensive posts to ward off pirates.

The signing of the Anglo-Dutch Treaty of 1814, part of the aftermath of the Napoleonic Wars, was the beginning of the end for Hare's dream of an independent state. Although both Raffles and his successor as Lieutenant General, John Fendall, resisted Dutch requests for the Borneo colonies to be returned as they considered them deserted by the Dutch rather than conquered by the British and hence not falling under the terms of the treaty, this was not the position of the EIC as a whole. In January 1817, a Dutch representative signed a treaty giving them control of much territory around Banjarmasin in return for supporting the Sultan against his local and regional enemies. It is likely that Hare could have kept his estate despite this change of authority, but he antagonized the Dutch, making them feel that he was interested in using the estate as a springboard for further British intrusions on what they saw as their political and economic interests in the region. As a result in 1818 the new Dutch government declared that Hare had no legal right to the property (the Sultan having conveniently lost the earlier treaty he had signed with Hare), ordering the local Dutch contingent to take control of the land, by force if necessary. This was done in July 1818.

Hare's activity in Banjarmasin came under great scrutiny with the EIC concerned about his use of company funds for the development of his personal estate. There were also allegations that people had been forcibly relocated to the colony as a source of labour. A Commission of Inquiry, formed in 1816, investigated both charges, finding a great deal to complain about in terms of Hare's accounting. The Inquiry also faulted him with being aware that a number of females had been kidnapped and brought to the colony. However, the more serious charge, alleged by William Boggie, that he had enslaved over three thousand people was found to be unsupportable. William Boggie had his own grievances with Raffles, recorded in a letter written by his advocate James Simpson in 1834, and likely raised the issue as a means to discredit him—Raffles was widely known to detest the practice of slavery and if one of his appointees was found to be engaging in the practice on a massive scale it would have been extremely embarrassing. What is certain is that Hare faced a labour shortage that unless overcome would have made the development of his colony impossible. To overcome this obstacle, in 1812 he asked Raffles to have convicts from Java transported to Banjarmasin as part of their sentences as well as to encourage destitute individuals to migrate. The latter group was to be provided with assistance. Both could take their families, if they wished. However, the majority of both groups were single males and so, in order to rectify the imbalance, the authorities were enjoined to encourage female migration by offering a sum of money or release from debt.

== Batavia and Bencoolen ==
Hare left the colony two years before the Dutch takeover, moving to his estates at Pangielpingan and Kampong Mangis, near Batavia on the island of Java. He tried to resume trading with Malacca, but was harassed by the Dutch authorities who detained and seized several of his ships in 1817 and 1818. His movements were also restricted. Finally, in March 1819, he was banned from residing in the colony, although he was given a number of months in which to wrap up his affairs. He transferred the estates on Java to his son, also named Alexander, and in December embarked on a series of trips, first to the island of Lombok, to meet his brother John and transfer to a larger ship, and then to the EIC fort at Bencoolen (modern day Bengkulu) on the island of Sumatra. His plan was to settle at Cape Town, Cape Colony while the ship continued onward to England, but to do so it needed to be registered. Here he ran into difficulties because, like many other wealthy Europeans in the East Indies at the time, he had acquired slaves and concubines. In Hare's case this amounted to sixty adults and thirty children. The magistrate at Bencoolen freed these people, although Hare persuaded them to stay with him.

== Cape Town, South Africa ==
Arriving at Cape Town at the end of June he bought a farm outside of the town and settled down to a more sedentary life. However, the fact that he lived with a large number of concubines appears to have dampened his popularity within colonial society and may have been in large part responsible for his next move. In 1826 he landed on Pulo Selma, one of the uninhabited Cocos-Keeling Islands, where he proceeded to build a settlement. Later he moved to Pulo Beras and also established small outposts on many of the other islands. It appears that his long-term goal at this point was not a permanent residency, but rather a short-term base from which he could negotiate a return to his estates on Java. Unfortunately, it was a task harder than he first thought and in the meantime his former employee, John Clunies Ross, developed his own designs on the Islands, wanting to build them up as a way-station to the Indies, an idea inimical to Hare's notion of a good life. A state of conflict developed, resolving only when Hare abandoned his settlement in early 1831. It is likely that this final move in Hare's life was precipitated by dissolving of his family business interests in London—his source of funds dried up. It also meant that he could not take most of his followers and concubines, these individuals came under the control of Clunies-Ross. Hare sailed to Bencoolen where he established his residence, but died in November 1834.

== Hare's family and literary influence ==
Alexander Hare had three brothers: David (b. 1777), became a jeweller in Batavia, while John (b. 1782) and Joseph (b. 1784) were traders in colonial goods in London. The English censuses of 1851 and 1861 show Fatimah, Joseph's niece born in the East Indies, living in his London house: as she appears to have been born in 1837 she was presumably David's daughter. She married James Graham at St Peter's, Pimlico 22 May 1862 and died at London 1874.

Hare's story features in the novel The Daughter of the Pangaran by David Divine, published in 1963. Alexander Hare is central to the novel The Man Who Collected Women by Nigel Barley, published in 2020 by Monsoon Books.

He was a character in the 1940 radio play John Ross, King of Cocos Islands.
