= Clunies-Ross family =

Original settlers and rulers of the Cocos (Keeling) Islands

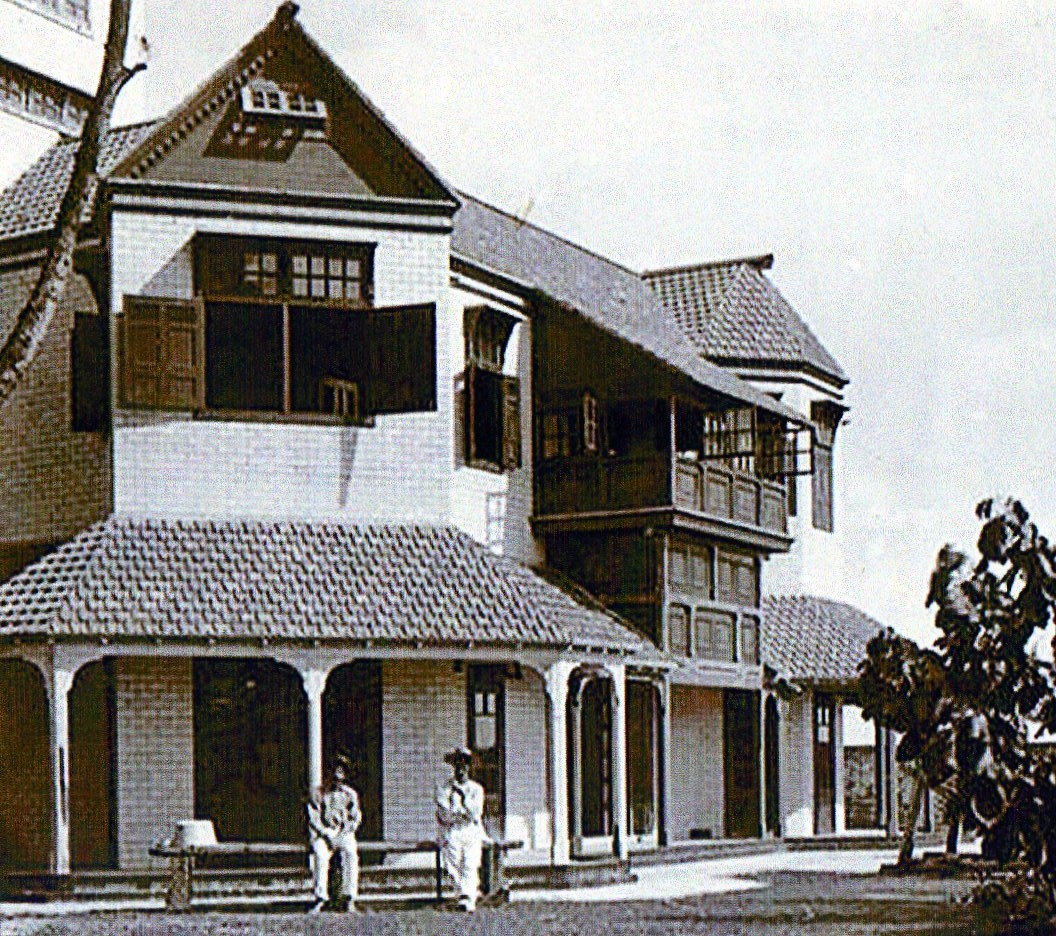
Oceania House, residence of the Clunies-Ross family

Family Crest

The Clunies-Ross family were the original settlers of the Cocos (Keeling) Islands, a small archipelago in the Indian Ocean. From 1827 to 1978, the family ruled the previously uninhabited islands as a private fiefdom, initially as terra nullius and then later under British (1857–1955) and Australian (1955–1978) sovereignty. The head of the family was usually recognised as the resident magistrate and was sometimes styled as the "King of the Cocos Islands", a title given by the press.

== History ==
=== John Clunies-Ross ===
John Clunies-Ross was a merchant born in Weisdale, Shetland on 23 August 1786. In 1813 he was at Timor as Third Mate on board the whaler Baroness Longueville when he received the opportunity to become captain of the brig Olivia, which he took. He reportedly first cruised the waters of the then uninhabited Cocos (Keeling) Islands in 1825. After surveying them he moved his family to live on one of the islands in 1827. Only Joshua Slocum used different dates, when he wrote that "John Clunis-Ross, who in 1814 touched [the island] in the ship Borneo on a voyage to India", nailed up a Union Jack with plans to settle in the future and "[...] returned 2 years later with his wife and family".

In 1823 an English adventurer, Alexander Hare, had settled on another of the islands with some runaway slaves. Hare soon departed, and Clunies-Ross alone obtained permanent rights by settlement. He planted hundreds of coconut palms and brought in Malay workers to the islands to harvest the nuts, building a business by selling copra. In the beginning, Javanese convicts were used as labourers and "crime of all kinds was rife", before "getting rid of the criminal class and obtaining a better type of Malay coolie."

According to a 1903 article in The Timaru Herald, Ross "[ran] his little colony on model lines and succeeded beyond expectation" and Charles Darwin mentioned after his 1836 visit with HMS Beagle that he "found the natives in a state of freedom". However, the article omitted the sentence that immediately followed: "but in most other points they are considered as slaves". Ross traded with Dutch vessels en route to Dutch ports on Java and Sumatra, and became a naturalised Dutch subject; he had approached both the British and the Dutch government for annexation but neither had responded. John Clunies-Ross died in 1854.

His life was dramatised in the play John Ross, King of Cocos Islands.

=== John George Clunies-Ross ===
His son John George Clunies-Ross (born 1823) took over from his father under the name of Ross II. In 1857 British Captain Stephen Grenville Fremantle visited aboard HMS Juno who "took possession of the islands in the name of the Britannic Majesty's Government". Fremantle appointed John George as superintendent of the islands and left after a 3-month vacation. The connection to Britain changed nothing in Ross's autonomous administration, and it was not until fifteen years later another British ship arrived for a complete survey of the island. Apparently, Fremantle annexed the islands by mistake, thinking he had arrived on the Coco Islands of the Andaman Islands.

John George Clunies-Ross received the Malay title of Tuan Pandai ('the learned one') due to his amateur medical knowledge and research into the natural history of the islands. The head of the family Clunies-Ross kept the title 'Tuan', a term that can be translated as 'sir'. He married S'pia Dupong, a Malay of high rank, in 1841.

=== George Clunies-Ross ===
Born on 20 June 1842 in the Cocos Islands to John George Clunies-Ross and S'pia Dupong, George Clunies-Ross was sent to Scotland where he studied engineering at Glasgow. In 1871, known as Tuan Tinggi, he became superintendent after his father died, then married Inin (1850–1889), a Malay of high-rank like his mother. It was during his administration, in 1885, that the first annual inspection by a representative of the Straits Settlements Government occurred.

In 1886 Queen Victoria granted the islands in perpetuity to the Clunies-Ross family. Representatives of the Government of the Straits Settlements were sent to the island each year and reports reflected that "members of the Clunies-Ross family are to-day in every sense of the word proprietors of the islands, for Mr George Clunies-Ross makes his own laws and interprets them, polices his little domain, provides his own coinage [...] controls the entire trade and acts as 'the universal provider' to satisfy the wants of the community". According to Chambers' Journal, there had not been any metallic coins since 1837. Six years after Inin's death, George Clunies-Ross married Ayesha, a former boi (servant) in 1895.

In 1903, the islands were annexed to the Straits Settlements and incorporated as part of the settlement of Singapore, without affecting the ownership of the territory. George Clunies-Ross died on 7 July 1910 at Ventnor, in the Isle of Wight, after going to England for medical treatment. His body was taken back to the Cocos in 1914.

=== John Sidney Clunies-Ross ===
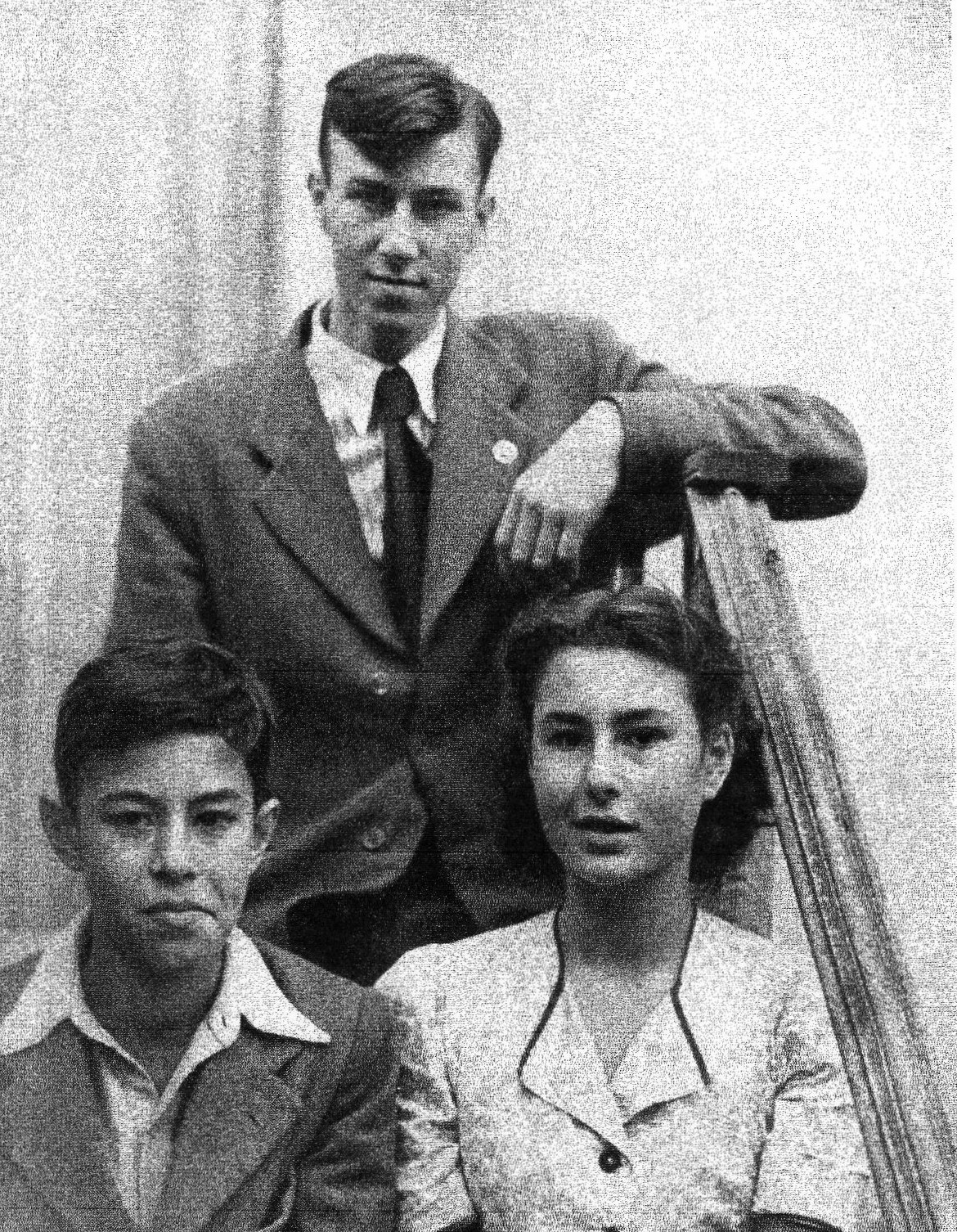
Clunies-Ross family, 1930s generation.

John Sidney Clunies-Ross was born in the Coco Islands on 13 November 1868, the son of George Clunies-Ross and Inin. Known as Tuan Ross, he inherited an economic disaster after a cyclone destroyed almost every house and coconut palm on Home Island in November 1909.

During the Second World War, the Cocos islands served as a major base for the Royal Air Force. John Sidney Clunies-Ross died of a heart attack during a Japanese bombing on the islands in August 1944. The British military took over control of Home Island until John Cecil Clunies-Ross returned to the Cocos on 6 July 1946.

=== John Cecil Clunies-Ross ===
The title to the islands was claimed by the Ross family until 1978, when John Cecil Clunies-Ross (born 29 November 1928), known as Tuan John, sold them to the Commonwealth of Australia for £2.5m ($4.75m) under threat of expropriation, with the exception of his house on Home Island, which was eventually purchased by the government in 1993. The Commonwealth had already been administering the islands since November 1955, with the proclamation of the Cocos (Keeling) Island Act 1955.

John C. Clunies-Ross eventually went bankrupt after the Australian government refused to give any business to his shipping line company. He then moved to Perth with his wife. During the 1984 referendum, he campaigned for independence but the majority of the islanders chose integration with Australia.

He died in Perth at the age of 92 on 13 September 2021.

== Legacy ==
As of 2007, John "Johnny" George Clunies-Ross (born 1957), the son of John C. Clunies-Ross, lived on the West Island, breeding Giant clams. He stated that he was initially frustrated with the 1978 transfer of the islands to Australia, but that he had changed his mind since then: "I was 21 and I'd been brought up to do the job. But even in the old man's time, it had become anachronistic. It had to change".

== List of resident magistrates ==
Resident magistrate	Regnal name	Native title	Lifespan	Took office	Left office
John Clunies-Ross	Clunies-Ross I		1786–1854	1827	1854
John George Clunies-Ross	Clunies-Ross II	Tuan Pandai	1823–1871	1854	1871
George Clunies-Ross	Clunies-Ross III	Tuan Tinggi	1842–1910	1871	1910
John Sidney Clunies-Ross	Clunies-Ross IV	Tuan Ross	1868–1944	1910	1944
John Cecil Clunies-Ross	Clunies-Ross V	Tuan John	1928–2021	1946	1978

== See also ==
- List of administrative heads of the Cocos (Keeling) Islands
- Ian Clunies Ross, prominent Australian scientist and administrator and relative of the Clunies-Ross family
- Alfred Clunies-Ross, the first non-white rugby union international player and relative of the Clunies-Ross family
- Pulu Cocos Museum
