= List of birds of the Cocos (Keeling) Islands =

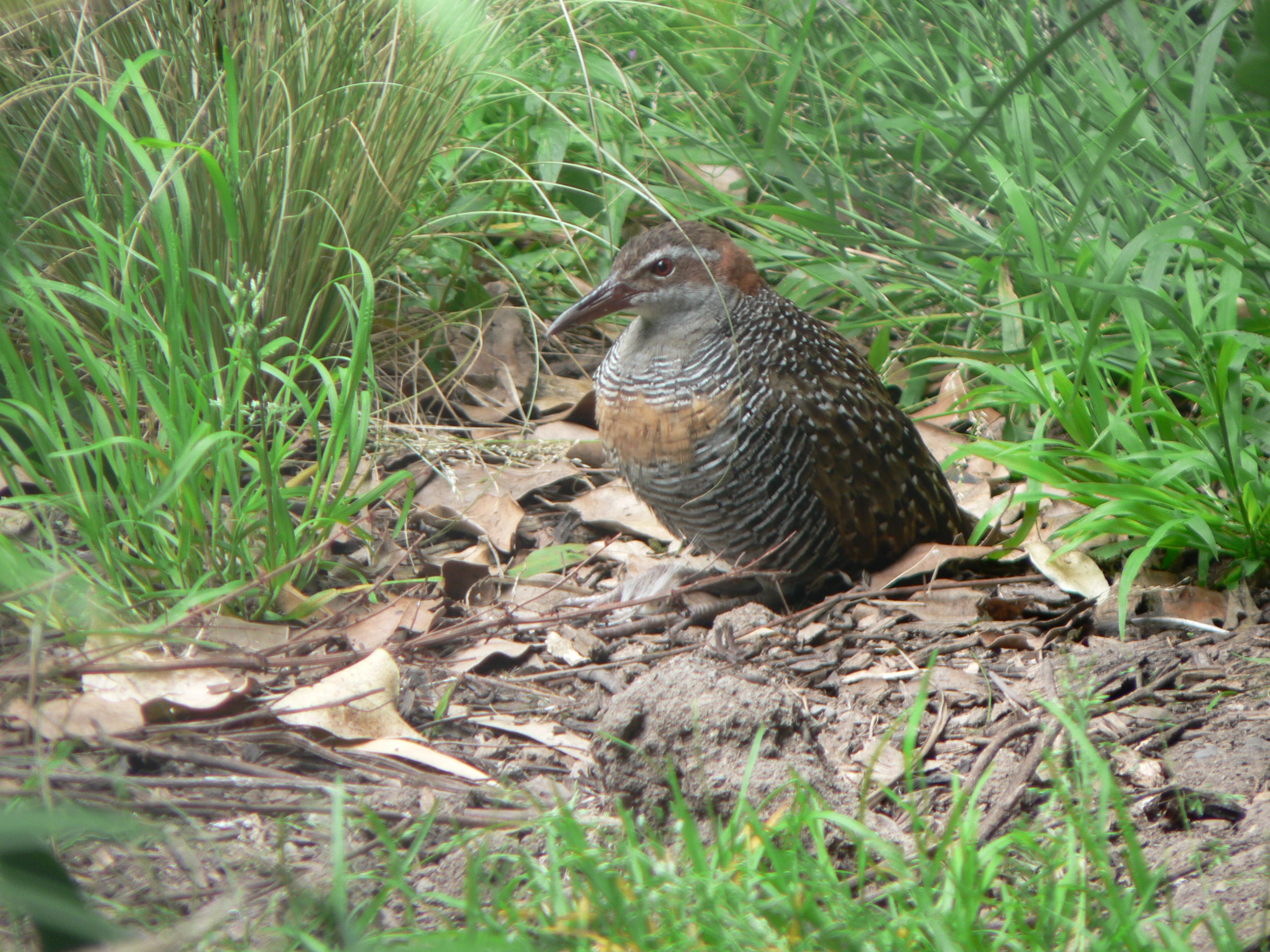
The endemic subspecies of buff-banded rail

This is a list of the bird species recorded in the Cocos (Keeling) Islands. The avifauna of the Cocos (Keeling) Islands include a total of 154 species, of which 5 have been introduced by humans.

This list's taxonomic treatment (designation and sequence of orders, families and species) and nomenclature (common and scientific names) follow the conventions of The Clements Checklist of the Birds of the World, 2022 edition. The family accounts at the beginning of each heading reflect this taxonomy, as do the species counts found in each family account. Introduced and accidental species are included in the total counts for . the Cocos (Keeling) Islands.

The following tags have been used to highlight several categories, but not all species fall into one of these categories. Those that do not are commonly occurring native species.

- (A) Accidental - a species that rarely or accidentally occurs in Cocos (Keeling) Islands
- (I) Introduced - a species introduced to Cocos (Keeling) Islands as a consequence, direct or indirect, of human actions

== Ducks, geese, and waterfowl ==
Order: Anseriformes Family: Anatidae

Anatidae includes the ducks and most duck-like waterfowl, such as geese and swans. These birds are adapted to an aquatic existence with webbed feet, flattened bills, and feathers that are excellent at shedding water due to an oily coating.

- Garganey, Spatula querquedula (A)
- Pacific black duck, Anas superciliosa (A)
- Northern pintail, Anas acuta (A)
- Green-winged teal, Anas crecca (A)
- Gray teal, Anas gracilis
- Hardhead, Aythya australis (A)

== Pheasants, grouse, and allies ==
Order: Galliformes Family: Phasianidae

The Phasianidae are a family of terrestrial birds which consists of quails, partridges, snowcocks, francolins, spurfowls, tragopans, monals, pheasants, peafowls and jungle fowls. In general, they are plump (although they vary in size) and have broad, relatively short wings.

- Red junglefowl, Gallus gallus (I)
- Green junglefowl, Gallus varius (I)

== Flamingos ==
Order: Phoenicopteriformes Family: Phoenicopteridae

Flamingos are gregarious wading birds, usually 3 to 5 feet (0.9 to 1.5 m) tall, found in both the Western and Eastern Hemispheres. Flamingos filter-feed on shellfish and algae. Their oddly shaped beaks are specially adapted to separate mud and silt from the food they consume and, uniquely, are used upside-down.

- Greater flamingo, Phoenicopterus roseus (A)

== Pigeons and doves ==
Order: Columbiformes Family: Columbidae

Pigeons and doves are stout-bodied birds with short necks and short slender bills with a fleshy cere.

- Rock pigeon, Columba livia (I)
- Oriental turtle-dove, Streptopelia orientalis (A)

== Cuckoos ==
Order: Cuculiformes Family: Cuculidae

The family Cuculidae includes cuckoos, roadrunners and anis. These birds are of variable size with slender bodies, long tails and strong legs. The Old World cuckoos are brood parasites.

- Chestnut-winged cuckoo, Clamator coromandus (A)
- Asian koel, Eudynamys scolopaceus (A)
- Horsfield's bronze-cuckoo, Chrysococcyx basalis
- Square-tailed drongo-cuckoo, Surniculus lugubris (A)
- Large hawk-cuckoo, Hierococcyx sparverioides (A)
- Hodgson's hawk-cuckoo, Hierococcyx nisicolor (A)
- Indian cuckoo, Cuculus micropterus (A)
- Oriental cuckoo, Cuculus saturatus

== Swifts ==
Order: Caprimulgiformes Family: Apodidae

Swifts are small birds which spend the majority of their lives flying. These birds have very short legs and never settle voluntarily on the ground, perching instead only on vertical surfaces. Many swifts have long swept-back wings which resemble a crescent or boomerang.

- White-throated needletail, Hirundapus caudacutus (A)
- Pacific swift, Apus pacificus (A)

== Rails, gallinules and coots ==
Order: Gruiformes Family: Rallidae

Rallidae is a large family of small to medium-sized birds which includes the rails, crakes, coots and gallinules. Typically they inhabit dense vegetation in damp environments near lakes, swamps or rivers. In general they are shy and secretive birds, making them difficult to observe. Most species have strong legs and long toes which are well adapted to soft uneven surfaces. They tend to have short, rounded wings and to be weak fliers.

- Buff-banded rail, Gallirallus philippensis
- Eurasian moorhen, Gallinula chloropus (A)
- Watercock, Gallicrex cinerea (A)
- White-breasted waterhen, Amaurornis phoenicurus
- Baillon's crake, Zapornia pusilla (A)

== Stilts and avocets ==
Order: Charadriiformes Family: Recurvirostridae

Recurvirostridae is a family of large wading birds, which includes the avocets and stilts. The avocets have long legs and long up-curved bills. The stilts have extremely long legs and long, thin, straight bills.

- Pied stilt, Himantopus leucocephalus

== Plovers and lapwings ==
Order: Charadriiformes Family: Charadriidae

The family Charadriidae includes the plovers, dotterels and lapwings. They are small to medium-sized birds with compact bodies, short, thick necks and long, usually pointed, wings. They are found in open country worldwide, mostly in habitats near water.

- Black-bellied plover, Pluvialis squatarola (A)
- Pacific golden-plover, Pluvialis fulva
- Lesser sand-plover, Charadrius mongolus (A)
- Greater sand-plover, Charadrius leschenaultii (A)
- Caspian plover, Charadrius asiaticus (A)
- Kentish plover, Charadrius alexandrinus (A)
- Oriental plover, Charadrius veredus (A)

== Sandpipers and allies ==
Order: Charadriiformes Family: Scolopacidae

Scolopacidae is a large diverse family of small to medium-sized shorebirds including the sandpipers, curlews, godwits, shanks, tattlers, woodcocks, snipes, dowitchers and phalaropes. The majority of these species eat small invertebrates picked out of the mud or soil. Variation in length of legs and bills enables multiple species to feed in the same habitat, particularly on the coast, without direct competition for food.

- Whimbrel, Numenius phaeopus (A)
- Little curlew, Numenius minutus (A)
- Far Eastern curlew, Numenius madagascariensis (A)
- Eurasian curlew, Numenius arquata (A)
- Bar-tailed godwit, Limosa lapponica (A)
- Black-tailed godwit, Limosa limosa (A)
- Ruddy turnstone, Arenaria interpres
- Great knot, Calidris tenuirostris (A)
- Red knot, Calidris canutus (A)
- Broad-billed sandpiper, Calidris falcinellus
- Sharp-tailed sandpiper, Calidris acuminata (A)
- Curlew sandpiper, Calidris ferruginea (A)
- Long-toed stint, Calidris subminuta
- Red-necked stint, Calidris ruficollis (A)
- Sanderling, Calidris alba (A)
- Little stint, Calidris minuta (A)
- Pectoral sandpiper, Calidris melanotos
- Pin-tailed snipe, Gallinago stenura (A)
- Terek sandpiper, Xenus cinereus (A)
- Red-necked phalarope, Phalaropus lobatus (A)
- Common sandpiper, Actitis hypoleucos
- Gray-tailed tattler, Tringa brevipes (A)
- Common greenshank, Tringa nebularia (A)
- Wood sandpiper, Tringa glareola
- Common redshank, Tringa totanus (A)

== Pratincoles and coursers ==
Order: Charadriiformes Family: Glareolidae

Glareolidae is a family of wading birds comprising the pratincoles, which have short legs, long pointed wings and long forked tails, and the coursers, which have long legs, short wings and long, pointed bills which curve downwards.

- Oriental pratincole, Glareola maldivarum (A)

== Gulls, terns, and skimmers ==
Order: Charadriiformes Family: Laridae

Laridae is a family of medium to large seabirds, the gulls, terns and skimmers. Gulls are typically gray or white, often with black markings on the head or wings. They have stout, longish bills and webbed feet. Terns are a group of generally medium to large seabirds typically with gray or white plumage, often with black markings on the head. Most terns hunt fish by diving but some pick insects off the surface of fresh water. Terns are generally long-lived birds, with several species known to live in excess of 30 years. Skimmers are a small family of tropical tern-like birds. They have an elongated lower mandible which they use to feed by flying low over the water surface and skimming the water for small fish.

- Lesser black-backed gull, Larus fuscus (A)
- Brown noddy, Anous stolidus
- Lesser noddy, Anous tenuirostris (A)
- White tern, Gygis alba
- Sooty tern, Onychoprion fuscatus
- Bridled tern, Onychoprion anaethetus (A)
- Little tern, Sternula albifrons
- Saunders's tern Sternula saundersi (A)
- Gull-billed tern Gelochelidon nilotica
- White-winged tern, Chlidonias leucopterus (A)
- Whiskered tern, Chlidonias hybrida (A)
- Common tern, Sterna hirundo (A)
- Great crested tern, Thalasseus bengalensis
- Lesser crested tern, Thalasseus bergii (A)

== Tropicbirds ==
Order: Phaethontiformes Family: Phaethontidae

Tropicbirds are slender white birds of tropical oceans, with exceptionally long central tail feathers. Their heads and long wings have black markings.

- White-tailed tropicbird, Phaethon lepturus
- Red-tailed tropicbird, Phaethon rubricauda

== Penguins ==
Order: Sphenisciformes Family: Spheniscidae

Penguins are a group of aquatic, flightless birds living almost exclusively in the Southern Hemisphere, especially in Antarctica. Only one species, the little penguin, breeds on the Australian coast.

- Southern rockhopper penguin, Eudyptes chrysocome (A)

== Albatrosses ==
Order: Procellariiformes Family: Diomedeidae

The albatrosses are a family of large seabird found across the Southern and North Pacific Oceans. The largest are among the largest flying birds in the world.

- Yellow-nosed albatross, Thalassarche chlororhynchos

== Southern storm-petrels ==
Order: Procellariiformes Family: Oceanitidae

The southern storm-petrels are the smallest seabirds, relatives of the petrels, feeding on planktonic crustaceans and small fish picked from the surface, typically while hovering. Their flight is fluttering and sometimes bat-like.

- Wilson's storm-petrel, Oceanites oceanicus
- Black-bellied storm-petrel, Fregetta tropica

== Shearwaters and petrels ==
Order: Procellariiformes Family: Procellariidae

The procellariids are the main group of medium-sized "true petrels", characterised by united nostrils with medium nasal septum, and a long outer functional primary flight feather.

- Herald petrel, Pterodroma arminjoniana (A)
- Barau's petrel, Pterodroma baraui (A)
- Bulwer's petrel, Bulweria bulwerii (A)
- Jouanin's petrel, Bulweria fallax (A)
- Wedge-tailed shearwater, Ardenna pacificus
- Tropical shearwater, Puffinus bailloni (A)

== Frigatebirds ==
Order: Suliformes Family: Fregatidae

Frigatebirds are large seabirds usually found over tropical oceans. They are large, black, or black-and-white, with long wings and deeply forked tails. The males have coloured inflatable throat pouches. They do not swim or walk and cannot take off from a flat surface. Having the largest wingspan-to-body-weight ratio of any bird, they are essentially aerial, able to stay aloft for more than a week.

- Lesser frigatebird, Fregata ariel
- Christmas Island frigatebird, Fregata andrewsi (A)
- Great frigatebird, Fregata minor

== Boobies and gannets ==
Order: Suliformes Family: Sulidae

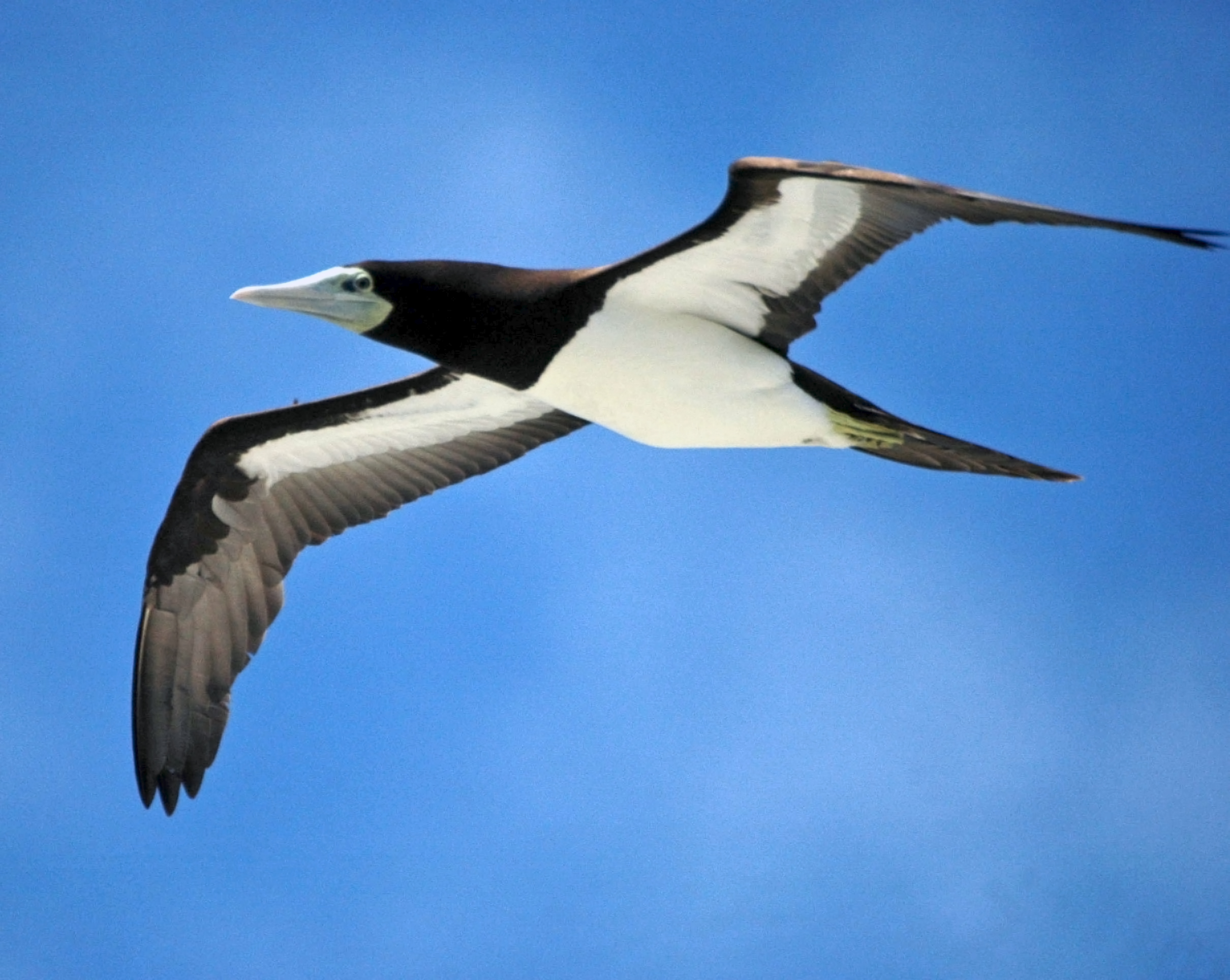
Brown booby

The sulids comprise the gannets and boobies. Both groups are medium-large coastal seabirds that plunge-dive for fish.

- Masked booby, Sula dactylatra
- Brown booby, Sula leucogaster
- Red-footed booby, Sula sula

== Cormorants and shags ==
Order: Suliformes Family: Phalacrocoracidae

Cormorants are medium-to-large aquatic birds, usually with mainly dark plumage and areas of coloured skin on the face. The bill is long, thin and sharply hooked. Their feet are four-toed and webbed, a distinguishing feature among the order Pelecaniformes.

- Little pied cormorant, Microcarbo melanoleucos (A)
- Little black cormorant, Phalacrocorax sulcirostris (A)

== Herons, egrets, and bitterns ==
Order: Pelecaniformes Family: Ardeidae

The family Ardeidae contains the bitterns, herons, and egrets. Herons and egrets are medium to large wading birds with long necks and legs. Bitterns tend to be shorter necked and more wary. Members of Ardeidae fly with their necks retracted, unlike other long-necked birds such as storks, ibises, and spoonbills.

- Yellow bittern, Ixobrychus sinensis (A)
- Schrenck's bittern, Ixobrychus eurhythmus (A)
- Cinnamon bittern, Ixobrychus cinnamomeus (A)
- Black bittern, Ixobrychus flavicollis (A)
- Great egret, Ardea alba (A)
- Intermediate egret, Ardea intermedia (A)
- White-faced heron, Egretta novaehollandiae (A)
- Little egret, Egretta garzetta (A)
- Western reef-heron, Egretta gularis
- Pacific reef-heron, Egretta sacra
- Cattle egret, Bubulcus ibis (A)
- Chinese pond-heron, Ardeola bacchus
- Javan pond-heron, Ardeola speciosa (A)
- Striated heron, Butorides striatus (A)
- Black-crowned night-heron, Nycticorax nycticorax (A)
- Nankeen night-heron, Nycticorax caledonicus
- Malayan night-heron, Gorsachius melanolophus (A)

== Ibises and spoonbills ==
Order: Pelecaniformes Family: Threskiornithidae

Threskiornithidae is a family of large terrestrial and wading birds which includes the ibises and spoonbills. They have long, broad wings with 11 primary and about 20 secondary feathers. They are strong fliers and despite their size and weight, very capable soarers.

- Glossy ibis, Plegadis falcinellus (A)

== Osprey ==
Order: Accipitriformes Family: Pandionidae

The family Pandionidae contains only one species, the osprey. The osprey is a medium-large raptor which is a specialist fish-eater with a worldwide distribution.

- Osprey, Pandion haliaetus

== Hawks, eagles, and kites ==
Order: Accipitriformes Family: Accipitridae

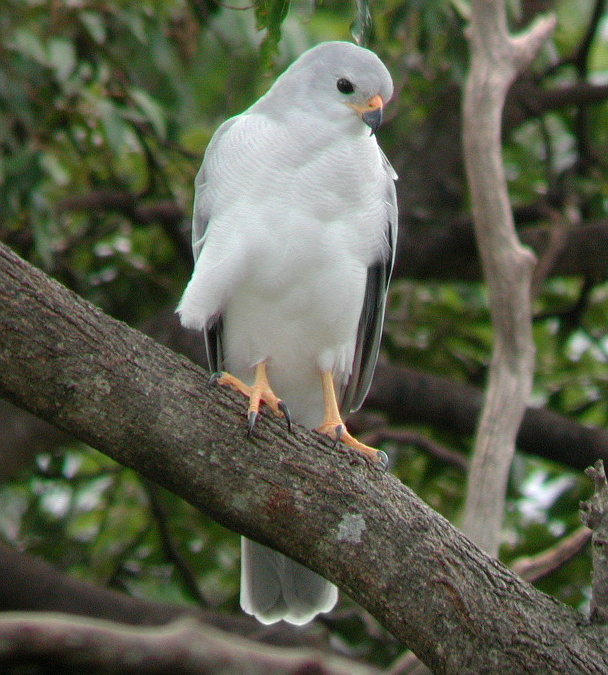
Gray goshawk

Accipitridae is a family of birds of prey, which includes hawks, eagles, kites, harriers and Old World vultures. These birds have powerful hooked beaks for tearing flesh from their prey, strong legs, powerful talons and keen eyesight.

- Oriental honey-buzzard, Pernis ptilorhynchus (A)
- Swamp harrier, Circus approximans (A)
- Chinese sparrowhawk, Accipiter soloensis (A)
- Japanese sparrowhawk, Accipiter gularis (A)

== Owls ==
Order: Strigiformes Family: Strigidae

The typical owls are small to large solitary nocturnal birds of prey. They have large forward-facing eyes and ears, a hawk-like beak, and a conspicuous circle of feathers around each eye called a facial disk.

- Buffy fish-owl, Ketupa ketupu (A)

== Kingfishers ==
Order: Coraciiformes Family: Alcedinidae

Kingfishers are medium-sized birds with large heads, long pointed bills, short legs, and stubby tails.

- Common kingfisher, Alcedo atthis (A)
- Collared kingfisher, Todiramphus chloris

== Bee-eaters ==
Order: Coraciiformes Family: Meropidae

The bee-eaters are a group of near passerine birds in the family Meropidae. Most species are found in Africa but others occur in southern Europe, Madagascar, Australia, and New Guinea. They are characterised by richly coloured plumage, slender bodies, and usually elongated central tail feathers. All are colourful and have long downturned bills and pointed wings, which give them a swallow-like appearance when seen from afar.

- Rainbow bee-eater, Merops ornatus (A)

== Rollers ==
Order: Coraciiformes Family: Coraciidae

Rollers resemble crows in size and build, but are more closely related to the kingfishers and bee-eaters. They share the colourful appearance of those groups with blues and browns predominating. The two inner front toes are connected, but the outer toe is not.

- European roller, Coracias garrulus (A)
- Dollarbird, Eurystomus orientalis (A)

== Falcons and caracaras ==
Order: Falconiformes Family: Falconidae

Falconidae is a family of diurnal birds of prey. They differ from hawks, eagles, and kites in that they kill with their beaks instead of their talons.

- Nankeen kestrel, Falco cenchroides (A)
- Amur falcon, Falco amurensis (A)
- Eurasian hobby, Falco subbuteo (A)
- Brown falcon, Falco berigora
- Peregrine falcon, Falco peregrinus

== Drongos ==
Order: Passeriformes Family: Dicruridae

The drongos are mostly black or dark grey in colour, sometimes with metallic tints. They have long forked tails, and some Asian species have elaborate tail decorations. They have short legs and sit very upright when perched, like a shrike. They flycatch or take prey from the ground.

- Crow-billed drongo, Dicrurus annectens (A)

== Shrikes ==
Order: Passeriformes Family: Laniidae

Shrikes are passerine birds known for their habit of catching other birds and small animals and impaling the uneaten portions of their bodies on thorns. A shrike's beak is hooked, like that of a typical bird of prey.

- Tiger shrike, Lanius tigrinus (A)
- Brown shrike, Lanius cristatus (A)

== Swallows ==
Order: Passeriformes Family: Hirundinidae

The family Hirundinidae is adapted to aerial feeding. They have a slender streamlined body, long pointed wings, and a short bill with a wide gape. The feet are adapted to perching rather than walking, and the front toes are partially joined at the base.

- Barn swallow, Hirundo rustica
- Tree martin, Petrochelidon nigricans
- Asian house-martin, Delichon dasypus (A)

== Leaf warblers ==
Order: Passeriformes Family: Phylloscopidae

Leaf warblers are a family of small insectivorous birds found mostly in Eurasia and ranging into Wallacea and Africa. The species are of various sizes, often green-plumaged above and yellow below, or more subdued with grayish-green to grayish-brown colors.

- Dusky warbler, Phylloscopus fuscatus (A)
- Arctic warbler, Phylloscopus borealis (A)

== White-eyes, yuhinas, and allies ==
Order: Passeriformes Family: Zosteropidae

The white-eyes are small and mostly undistinguished, their plumage above being generally some dull color like greenish-olive, but some species have a white or bright yellow throat, breast or lower parts, and several have buff flanks. As their name suggests, many species have a white ring around each eye.

- Christmas Island white-eye, Zosterops natalis (I)

== Starlings ==
Order: Passeriformes Family: Sturnidae

Starlings are small to medium-sized passerine birds. Their flight is strong and direct and they are very gregarious. Their preferred habitat is fairly open country. They eat insects and fruit. Plumage is typically dark with a metallic sheen.

- Rosy starling, Pastor roseus (A)
- Daurian starling, Agropsar sturninus (A)

== Thrushes and allies ==
Order: Passeriformes Family: Turdidae

The thrushes are a group of passerine birds that occur mainly in the Old World. They are plump, soft plumaged, small to medium-sized insectivores or sometimes omnivores, often feeding on the ground. Many have attractive songs.

- Siberian thrush, Geokichla sibirica (A)
- Eyebrowed thrush, Turdus obscurus (A)

== Old World flycatchers ==
Order: Passeriformes Family: Muscicapidae

Old World flycatchers are a large group of small passerine birds native to the Old World. They are mainly small arboreal insectivores. The appearance of these birds is highly varied, but they mostly have weak songs and harsh calls.

- Gray-streaked flycatcher, Muscicapa griseisticta (A)
- Dark-sided flycatcher, Muscicapa sibirica (A)
- Asian brown flycatcher, Muscicapa dauurica (A)
- Blue-and-white flycatcher, Cyanoptila cyanomelana (A)
- Narcissus flycatcher, Ficedula narcissina (A)
- Mugimaki flycatcher, Ficedula mugimaki (A)
- Blue rock-thrush, Monticola solitarius (A)

== Waxbills and allies ==
Order: Passeriformes Family: Estrildidae

The estrildid finches are small passerine birds of the Old World tropics and Australasia. They are gregarious and often colonial seed eaters with short thick but pointed bills. They are all similar in structure and habits, but have a wide variation in plumage colors and patterns.

- Java sparrow, Padda oryzivora (I)

== Wagtails and pipits ==
Order: Passeriformes Family: Motacillidae

Motacillidae is a family of small passerine birds with medium to long tails. They include the wagtails, longclaws and pipits. They are slender, ground feeding insectivores of open country.

- Gray wagtail, Motacilla cinerea (A)
- Eastern yellow wagtail, Motacilla tschutschensis (A)
- White wagtail, Motacilla alba (A)
- Red-throated pipit, Anthus cervinus (A)

== Old World buntings ==
Order: Passeriformes Family: Emberizidae

The emberizids are a large family of passerine birds. They are seed-eating birds with distinctively shaped bills. Many emberizid species have distinctive head patterns.

- Yellow-breasted bunting, Emberiza aureola (A)

== See also ==
- List of birds
- Lists of birds by region
