= Fauna of the Cocos (Keeling) Islands =

Native animals of the Cocos (Keeling) Islands

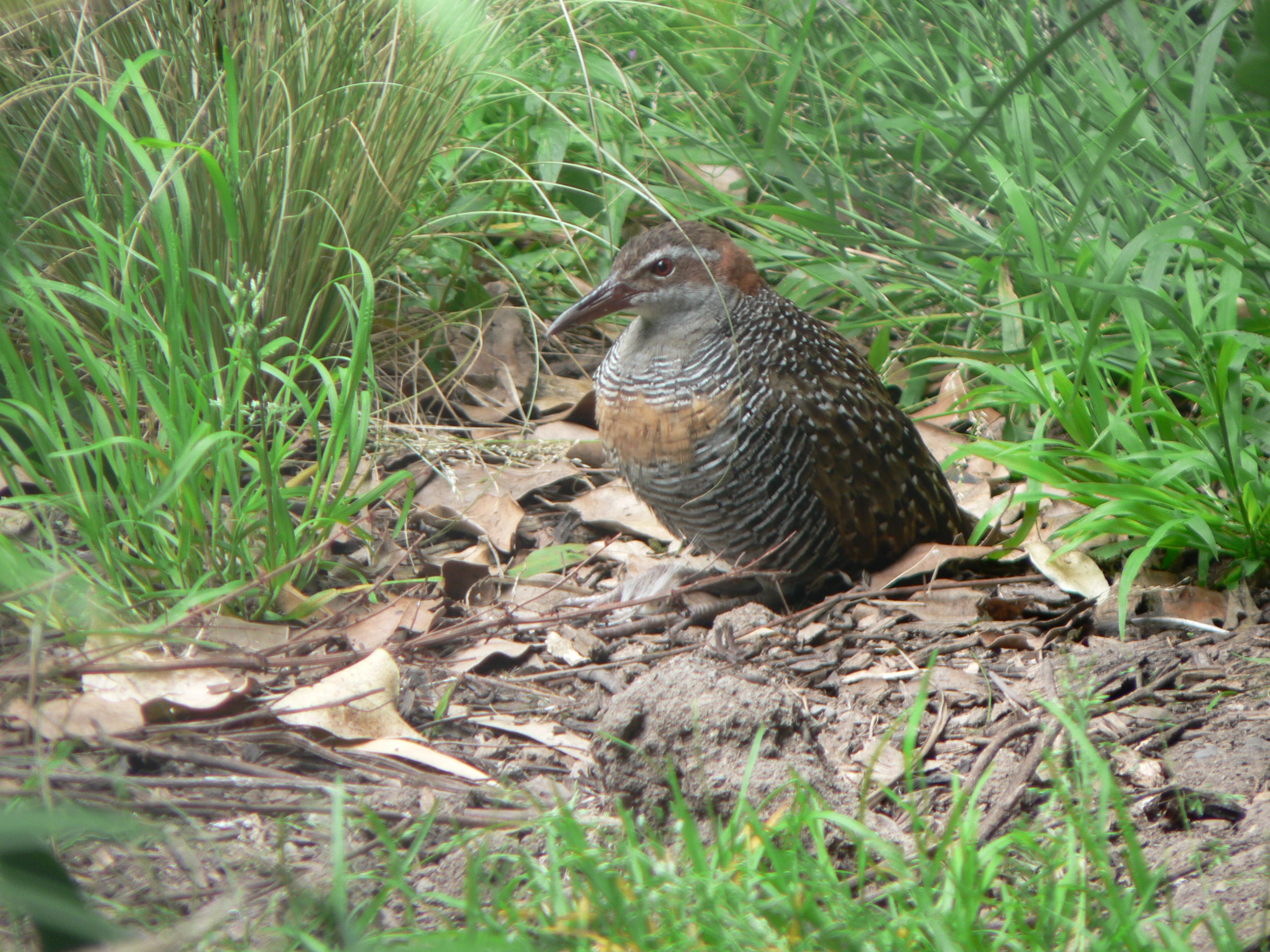
The endemic subspecies of buff-banded rail

The terrestrial fauna of the Cocos (Keeling) Islands is depauperate because of the small land area of the islands, their lack of diverse habitats, and their isolation from large land-masses. However, the fauna dependent on marine resources is much richer.

== Birds ==
As a small and isolated group of islands in two atolls 24 km (15 mi) apart in the eastern Indian Ocean, the number of species of resident landbirds (as opposed to seabirds and waders) is very small. These comprise the endemic subspecies of buff-banded rail, the introduced green junglefowl and helmeted guineafowl, the white-breasted waterhen, eastern reef egret, nankeen night heron and the introduced Christmas white-eye. Four other introduced species are now extinct in the Islands. Several other landbird species have been recorded occasionally, but none has established a breeding population.

Migratory waders recorded in the islands include some regular visitors as well as vagrants, though none of which breed on the islands. However, North Keeling is important for breeding seabirds, with sizeable numbers of red-footed boobies, great and lesser frigatebirds, common noddies and white terns. Other breeding seabirds include wedge-tailed shearwaters, masked boobies, brown boobies, red-tailed and white-tailed tropicbirds, and sooty terns. It is possible that the herald petrel breeds there as well.

Presumably, before human occupation of the islands in the 19th century, seabirds bred on both atolls. However, with the establishment of a human population and the introduction of rodents to the southern atoll, significant seabird colonies are now restricted to the northern atoll of North Keeling. Although the Cocos islanders used to visit North Keeling regularly to harvest seabirds, this practice largely ceased with the establishment of Pulu Keeling National Park in 1995.

=== List of birds ===
- Phasianidae
  - Red junglefowl, Gallus gallus - feral domestic fowl
  - Green junglefowl, Gallus varius - introduced, breeding
- Anatidae
  - Cotton pygmy-goose, Nettapus coromandelianus - vagrant
  - Australasian shoveler, Spatula rhynchotis - vagrant
  - Eurasian wigeon, Mareca penelope - regular visitor
  - Pacific black duck, Anas superciliosa - vagrant
  - Northern pintail, Anas acuta - vagrant
  - Green-winged teal, Anas crecca - vagrant
  - Grey teal, Anas gracilis - vagrant
  - Hardhead, Aythya australis - vagrant
- Procellariidae
  - Bulwer's petrel, Bulweria bulwerii - vagrant
  - Barau's petrel, Pterodroma baraui - possibly breeding
  - Wedge-tailed shearwater, Ardenna pacificus - breeding
- Diomedeidae
  - Yellow-nosed albatross, Thalassarche chlororhynchos - vagrant
- Phaethontidae
  - White-tailed tropicbird, Phaethon lepturus - breeding
  - Red-tailed tropicbird, Phaethon rubricauda - breeding
- Sulidae
  - Masked booby, Sula dactylatra - breeding
  - Brown booby, Sula leucogaster - breeding
  - Red-footed booby, Sula sula - breeding
- Phalacrocoracidae
  - Great cormorant, Phalacrocorax carbo - vagrant
  - Little black cormorant, Phalacrocorax sulcirostris - vagrant
  - Little pied cormorant, Phalacrocorax melanoleucos - vagrant
- Fregatidae
  - Christmas frigatebird, Fregata andrewsi - vagrant
  - Lesser frigatebird, Fregata ariel - breeding
  - Great frigatebird, Fregata minor - breeding
- Ardeidae
  - Eastern cattle egret, Ardea coromanda - vagrant
  - Great egret, Ardea alba - vagrant
  - Medium egret, Ardea intermedia - vagrant
  - Purple heron - Ardea purpurea - vagrant
  - Chinese pond-heron, Ardeola bacchus - vagrant
  - Javan pond-heron, Ardeola speciosa - vagrant
  - Striated heron, Butorides striatus - vagrant
  - Little egret, Egretta garzetta - vagrant
  - White-faced heron, Egretta novaehollandiae - vagrant
  - Pacific reef-heron, Egretta sacra - breeding
  - Western reef-heron, Egretta gularis
  - Malayan night-heron, Gorsachius melanolophus - vagrant
  - Nankeen night-heron, Nycticorax caledonicus - breeding
  - Black-crowned night-heron, Nycticorax nycticorax - vagrant
  - Black bittern, Ixobrychus flavicollis - vagrant
  - Cinnamon bittern, Ixobrychus cinnamomeus - vagrant
  - Schrenck's bittern, Ixobrychus eurhythmus - vagrant
  - Yellow bittern, Ixobrychus sinensis - vagrant
- Threskiornithidae
  - Glossy ibis, Plegadis falcinellus - vagrant
- Phoenicopteridae
  - Greater flamingo, Phoenicopterus ruber - vagrant
- Accipitridae
  - Oriental honey-buzzard, Pernis ptilorhynchus - vagrant
  - Swamp harrier, Circus approximans - vagrant
  - Chinese sparrowhawk, Accipiter soloensis - vagrant
  - Japanese sparrowhawk, Accipiter gularis - vagrant
- Falconidae
  - Nankeen kestrel, Falco cenchroides - vagrant
- Rallidae
  - Eurasian moorhen, Gallinula chloropus - vagrant
  - White-breasted waterhen, Amaurornis phoenicurus - breeding
  - Cocos buff-banded rail, Gallirallus philippensis andrewsi - endemic subspecies
  - Watercock, Gallicrex cinerea - vagrant
  - Baillon's crake, Zapornia pusilla - vagrant
- Scolopacidae
  - Common sandpiper, Actitis hypoleucos - regular visitor
  - Ruddy turnstone, Arenaria interpres - regular visitor
  - Sharp-tailed sandpiper, Calidris acuminata - vagrant
  - Sanderling, Calidris alba - vagrant
  - Curlew sandpiper, Calidris ferruginea - vagrant
  - Red-necked stint, Calidris ruficollis - vagrant
  - Red knot, Calidris canutus - vagrant
  - Great knot, Calidris tenuirostris - vagrant
  - Pin-tailed snipe, Gallinago stenura - vagrant
  - Bar-tailed godwit, Limosa lapponica - vagrant
  - Black-tailed godwit, Limosa limosa - vagrant
  - Little curlew, Numenius minutus - vagrant
  - Whimbrel, Numenius phaeopus - regular visitor
  - Grey-tailed tattler, Tringa brevipes - vagrant
  - Common greenshank, Tringa nebularia - regular visitor
  - Common redshank, Tringa totanus - regular visitor
  - Red-necked phalarope, Phalaropus lobatus - vagrant
- Recurvirostridae
  - Black-winged stilt, Himantopus himantopus leucocephalus - vagrant
- Charadriidae
  - Lesser sand-plover, Charadrius mongolus - vagrant
  - Greater sand-plover, Charadrius leschenaultii - vagrant
  - Caspian plover, Charadrius asiaticus - vagrant
  - Oriental plover, Charadrius veredus - vagrant
  - Pacific golden-plover, Pluvialis fulva - regular visitor
  - Black-bellied plover, Pluvialis squatarola - vagrant
- Glareolidae
  - Oriental pratincole, Glareola maldivarum - vagrant
- Laridae
  - Common noddy, Anous stolidus - breeding
  - Lesser noddy, Anous tenuirostris - vagrant
  - White-winged tern, Chlidonias leucopterus - vagrant
  - White tern, Gygis alba - breeding
  - Bridled tern, Onychoprion anaethetus - vagrant
  - Sooty tern, Onychoprion fuscatus - breeding
  - Common tern, Sterna hirundo - vagrant
  - Lesser crested tern, Thalasseus bergii - vagrant
  - Greater crested tern, Thalasseus bengalensis - vagrant
  - Saunders's tern Sternula saundersi - vagrant
- Columbidae
  - Oriental turtle-dove, Streptopelia orientalis - vagrant
  - Christmas imperial pigeon, Ducula whartoni - introduced, extinct
- Cuculidae
  - Chesnut-winged cuckoo, Clamator coromandus - vagrant
  - Asian koel, Eudynamys scolopaceus - vagrant
  - Horsfield's bronze-cuckoo, Chalcities basalis - vagrant
  - Large hawk-cuckoo, Hierococcyx sparverioides - vagrant
  - Hodgson's hawk-cuckoo, Hierococcyx nisicolor - vagrant
  - Square-tailed drongo-cuckoo, Surniculus lugubris - vagrant
  - Indian cuckoo, Cuculus micropterus - vagrant
  - Common cuckoo, Cuculus canorus - vagrant
  - Oriental cuckoo, Cuculus saturatus - vagrant
  - Asian koel, Eudynamys scolopaceus - vagrant
- Strigidae
  - Buffy fish owl, Ketupa ketupu - vagrant
- Caprimulgidae
  - Nightjar species, Caprimulgus - vagrant
- Apodidae
  - Pacific swift, Apus pacificus - vagrant
  - White-throated needletail, Hirundapus caudacutus - vagrant
- Alcedinidae
  - Collared kingfisher, Todiramphus chloris - vagrant
- Meropidae
  - Rainbow bee-eater, Merops ornatus - vagrant
- Coraciidae
  - Dollarbird, Eurystomus orientalis - vagrant
- Motacillidae
  - Grey wagtail, Motacilla cinerea - vagrant
  - Yellow wagtail, Motacilla flava - vagrant
- Passeridae
  - Java sparrow, Padda oryzivora - introduced, extinct
- Ploceidae
  - Asian golden weaver, Ploceus hypoxanthus - introduced, extinct
- Hirundinidae
  - Barn swallow, Hirundo rustica - regular visitor
  - Tree martin, Petrochelidon nigricans
  - Asian house-martin, Delichon dasypus - vagrant
- Zosteropidae
  - Christmas white-eye, Zosterops natalis - introduced, breeding
- Turdidae
  - Christmas thrush, Turdus poliocephalus erythropleurus - introduced, extinct
- Muscicapidae
  - Gray-streaked flycatcher, Muscicapa griseisticta - vagrant
  - Dark-sided flycatcher, Muscicapa sibirica - vagrant
  - Asian brown flycatcher, Muscicapa dauurica - vagrant
  - Blue-and-white flycatcher, Cyanoptila cyanomelana - vagrant
  - Narcissus flycatcher, Ficedula narcissina - vagrant
  - Mugimaki flycatcher, Ficedula mugimaki - vagrant
  - Blue rock-thrush, Monticola solitarius - vagrant
- Sturnidae
  - Rosy starling, Pastor roseus - vagrant

== Mammals ==
There are no native land mammals. Two species of rodent, the house mouse and black rat, have been introduced to the southern atoll but are absent from North Keeling. Rabbits were introduced but have become extinct. Two species of Asian deer, the Indian muntjac (Muntiacus muntjak), and Sambar (Cervus unicolor), were introduced but did not persist. Marine mammals recorded stranding on, or seen passing by, the islands include:

- Sirenia
  - Dugong, Dugong dugon – seen in the lagoon of the southern atoll
- Cetacea
  - Bottlenose dolphin, Tursiops truncatus – regularly seen
  - Common dolphin, Delphinus delphis – regularly seen
  - Pilot whale, Globicephala species
  - Humpback whale, Megaptera novaeangliae
  - Cuvier's beaked whale, Ziphius cavirostris
  - Sperm whale, Physeter macrocephalus

== Reptiles ==
Terrestrial reptiles include three geckos and a blind-snake, all of which may have been inadvertently transported to the islands by humans:

- Gekkonidae
  - Mourning gecko, Lepidodactylus lugubris
  - Four-clawed gecko, Gehyra mutilata
  - Common house gecko, Hemidactylus frenatus
- Typhlopidae
  - Brahminy blind snake, Typhlops braminus

Marine reptiles include:

- Hydrophiidae
  - Yellow-bellied sea snake, Pelamis platurus
  - Banded sea krait, Laticauda colubrina
- Chelonioidea
  - Green sea turtle, Chelonia mydas - breeding
  - Hawksbill sea turtle, Eretmochelys imbricata
  - Olive ridley sea turtle, Lepidochelys olivacea
  - Loggerhead sea turtle, Caretta caretta
  - Leatherback sea turtle, Dermochelys coriacea

== Fish ==
Over 500 species of fish have been recorded around the islands.

== See also ==
- Flora of the Cocos (Keeling) Islands
- List of mammals of Christmas Island
