= Index of Cocos (Keeling) Islands–related articles =

This article contains a list of topics related to the Cocos (Keeling) Islands.

== A ==
- Australia

== B ==
- Banknotes of the Cocos (Keeling) Islands
- Battle of Cocos

== C ==
- Cocos Buff-banded Rail
- Cocos Islands Mutiny
- Cocos (Keeling) Islands Airport

== F ==
- Fauna of the Cocos (Keeling) Islands
- Flora of the Cocos (Keeling) Islands

== K ==
- Keeling, William

== L ==
List of people on stamps of Australia

== N ==
- North Keeling

== S ==
SMS Emden (1908)

== T ==
- Transport in the Cocos (Keeling) Islands

== See also ==
- Lists of country-related topics - similar lists for other countries
