= B. andrewi =

B. andrewi may refer to:

- Brachypelma andrewi, a tarantula species of the genus Brachypelma

== See also ==
- Andrewi (disambiguation)
