= M. andrewsi =

M. andrewsi may refer to:

- Metridiochoerus andrewsi, an extinct pig species indigenous to the Pliocene and Pleistocene of Africa
- Moeritherium andrewsi, an extinct mammal species that lived during the Eocene epoch

== See also ==
- Andrewsi (disambiguation)
