= S. andrewi =

S. andrewi may refer to:

- Sinployea andrewi, a land gastropod of the genus Sinployea
- Strymon andrewi, a butterfly of the genus Strymon

== See also ==
- Andrewi (disambiguation)
