= B. andrewsi =

B. andrewsi may refer to:

- Bufo andrewsi, a toad species found in China
- Bunomys andrewsi, a rodent species

== See also ==
- Andrewsi (disambiguation)
