= North Keeling =

Island in Indian Ocean

Coordinates: 11°50′S 96°49′E

North Keeling Island
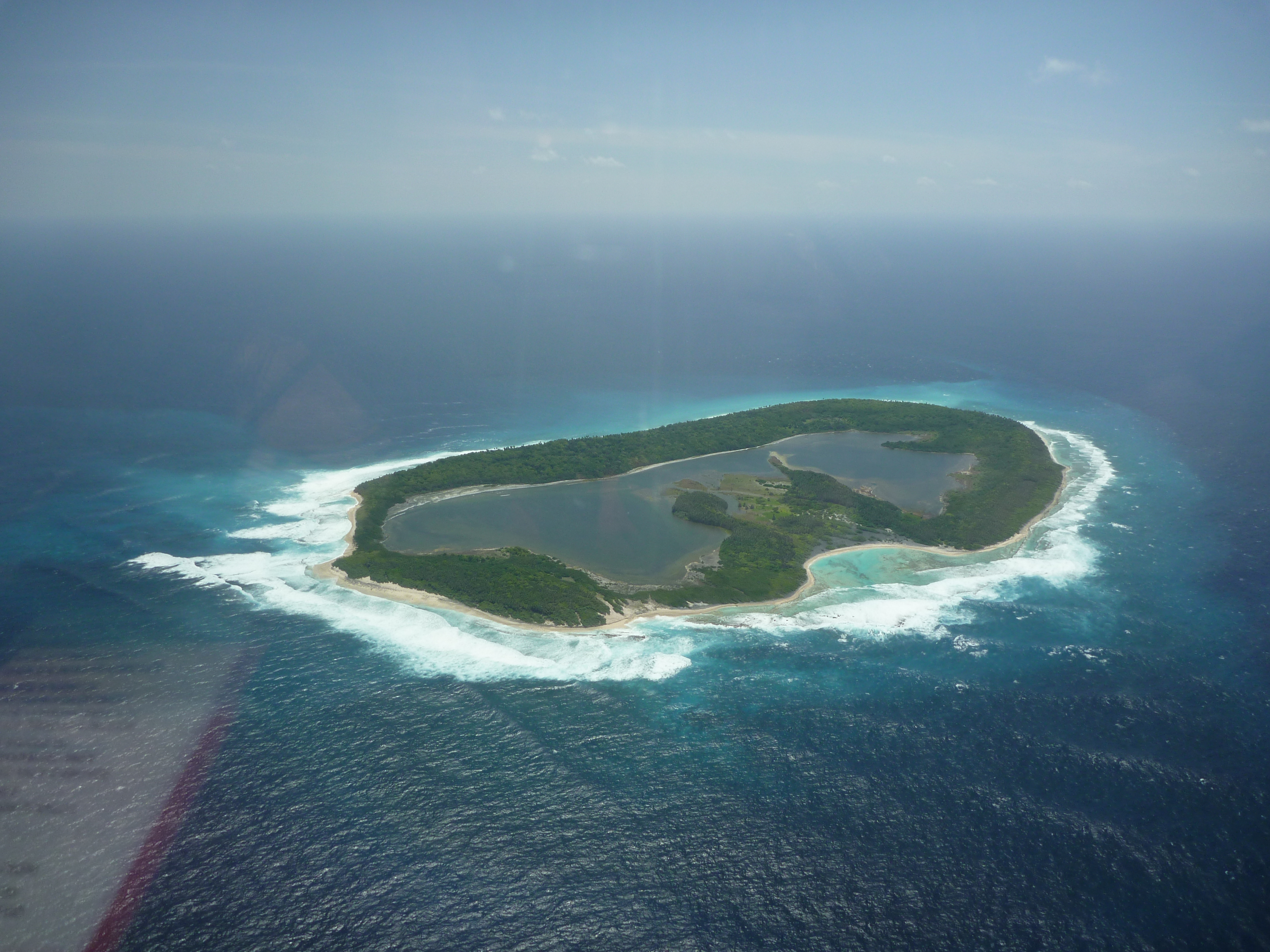

Ramsar Wetland
- Official name: Pulu Keeling National Park
- Designated: 17 March 1996
- Reference no.: 797

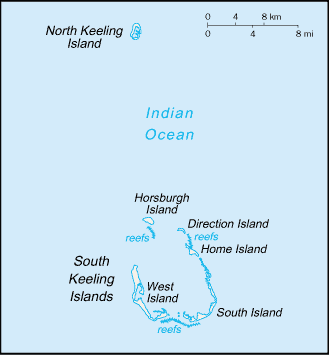
Map of the Cocos (Keeling) Islands. North Keeling is the uppermost of the islands in the group.

North Keeling is a small, uninhabited coral atoll, approximately 1.2 square kilometres (0.46 sq mi) in area, about 25 kilometres (16 mi) north of Horsburgh Island. It is the northernmost atoll and island of the Australian territory of the Cocos (Keeling) Islands. It consists of just one C-shaped island, a nearly closed atoll ring with a small opening into the lagoon, about 50 metres (160 ft) wide, on the east side. The lagoon is about 0.5 square kilometres (0.19 sq mi) in area. The island is home to the only surviving population of the endemic, and endangered, Cocos buff-banded rail, as well as large breeding colonies of seabirds. Since 1995, North Keeling Island and the surrounding sea to 1.5 kilometres (0.93 mi) from shore have been within the Pulu Keeling National Park.

== History ==
The Cocos (Keeling) Islands are believed to have first been seen by Europeans in 1609 by Captain William Keeling, after whom they are named, of the East India Company on a journey from Java in the Dutch East Indies. North Keeling was sketched by Ekeberg, a Swedish captain, in 1749, showing the presence of coconut palms. It also appears on a 1789 chart produced by British hydrographer Alexander Dalrymple.

North Keeling was visited in 1836 by Captain Robert FitzRoy and his companion Charles Darwin in HMS Beagle, who was, as with many other visitors, unable to land on the island.

In the 19th century many people suffering from Beriberi were put ashore at the island. Several graves are present, some from these people, but also from shipwrecks.

=== Battle of Cocos ===
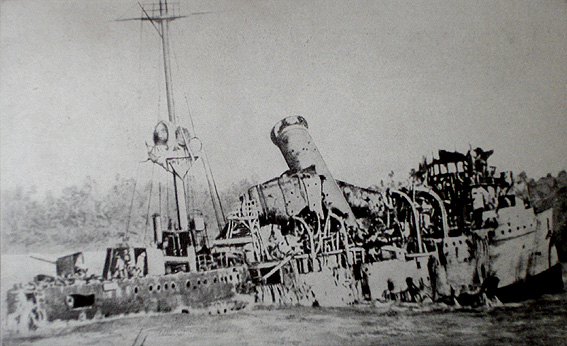
The wreck of the Emden; illustration published c. 1925

On 9 November 1914, the German cruiser SMS Emden attacked a wireless and cable station at Direction Island, attracting the attention of Australian cruiser HMAS Sydney. At 11:20, after an hour-and-a-half-long battle, the heavily damaged Emden was beached on North Keeling Island. In 1915, a Japanese company proposed that the ship be repaired and refloated, but an inspection by HMAS Protector concluded that wave damage to Emden made such an operation unfeasible. By 1919, there were reports that the wreck had almost completely broken up and disappeared.

=== Seabird hunting ===
Between the First and Second World Wars, groups of about 20 Cocos Malays were stationed on the island for up to a fortnight at a time to harvest timber, coconuts and birds to take back to Home Island. In the 1970s and 1980s, the acquisition of more efficient boats and firearms led to an increase in seabird hunting and concern about its impact on the seabird breeding colonies.

=== Pulu Keeling National Park ===
In 1986, an agreement was reached between the Australian National Parks and Wildlife Service and the Cocos Malay people to restrict and sustainably manage any further hunting on North Keeling. In 1989 Cyclone John devastated the red-footed booby colony on North Keeling and legal hunting ceased to allow the population to recover. Since then no legal hunting has taken place.

The Pulu Keeling National Park was established on 12 December 1995. It is important as a breeding island for seabirds and marine turtles. It is home to the endemic Cocos buff-banded rail, Gallirallus philippensis andrewsi and to the Cocos angelfish.

The national park was declared for the following purposes:

- the preservation of the area in its natural condition, and
- the encouragement and regulation of the appropriate use, appreciation and enjoyment of the area by the public

Access is by permit only.

=== Other protected area status ===
The island is listed as a wetland of international importance under the Ramsar Convention on 17 March 1996, as Ramsar Site 797. The island has also been identified by BirdLife International as an Important Bird Area because it supports over 1% of the world populations of red-footed boobies, lesser frigatebirds and common noddies. It has what is possibly the largest red-footed booby colony in the world as well as the second largest population of lesser frigatebirds in Australian territory.

== See also ==
- Fauna of the Cocos (Keeling) Islands
