= Andrewi =

Andrewi may refer to:

- Cape whitefish (Pseudobarbus andrewi), a ray-finned fish species in the family Cyprinidae
- Brachypelma andrewi, a tarantula species of the genus Brachypelma
- Myrmarachne andrewi, a jumping spider of the genus Myrmarachne
- Sinployea andrewi, a land gastropod of the genus Sinployea
- Strymon andrewi, a butterfly of the genus Strymon

== See also ==
- Andrew
- Andrewsi (disambiguation)
