= Andrewsi =

Andrewsi may refer to:

- Bufo andrewsi, a toad species found in China
- Bunomys andrewsi, a rodent species
- Christmas frigatebird or Christmas Island frigatebird (Fregata andrewsi), a frigatebird endemic to the Christmas Islands
- Metridiochoerus andrewsi, an extinct pig species indigenous to the Pliocene and Pleistocene of Africa
- Moeritherium andrewsi, an extinct mammal species that lived during the Eocene epoch

== See also ==
- Andrews (disambiguation)
- Andrews (surname)
- Andrewi (disambiguation)
