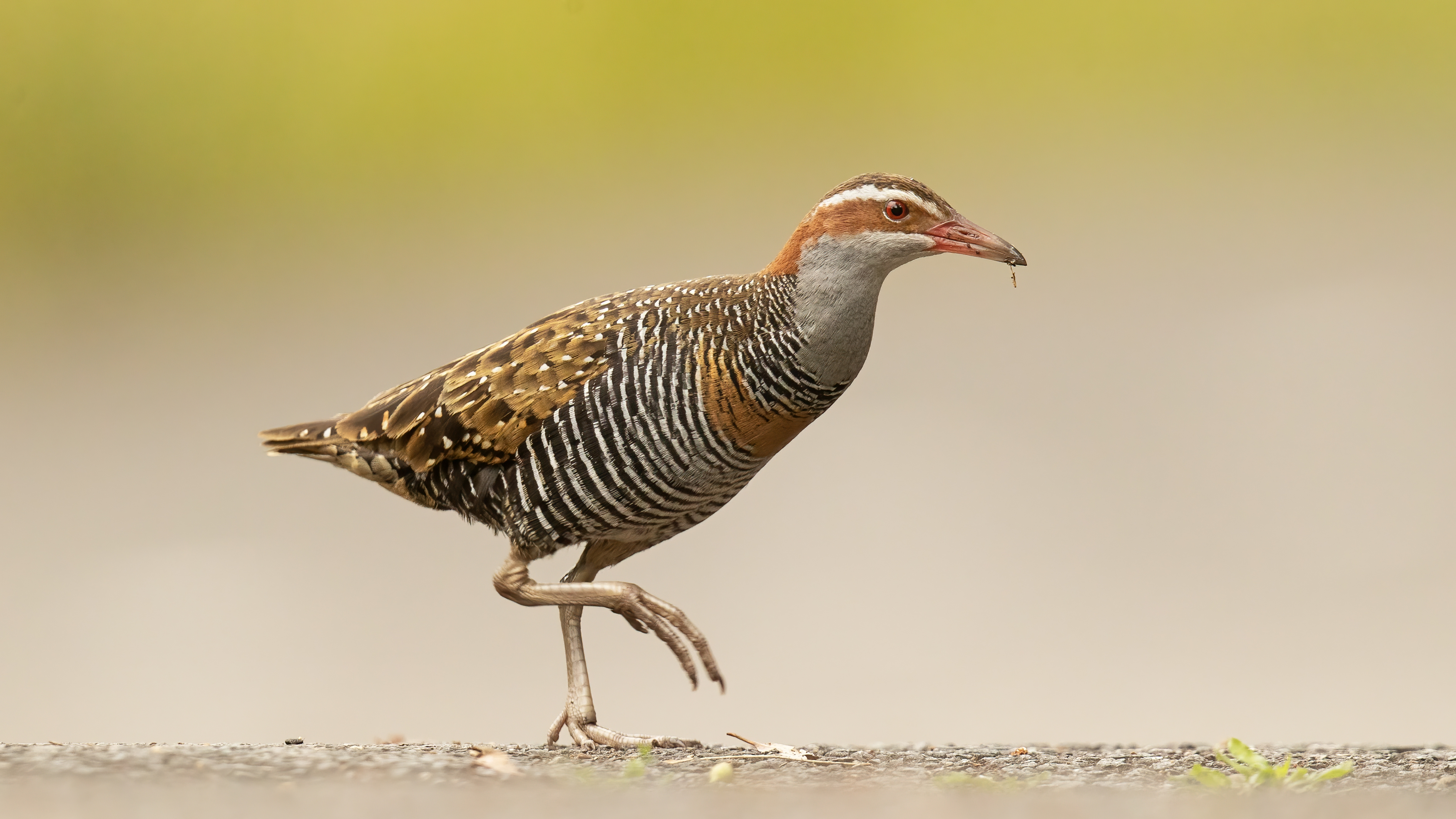

Conservation status
- Least Concern (IUCN 3.1)

Scientific classification
- Kingdom: Animalia
- Phylum: Chordata
- Class: Aves
- Order: Gruiformes
- Family: Rallidae
- Genus: Gallirallus
- Species: G. philippensis

Binomial name
- Gallirallus philippensis (Linnaeus, 1766)

Synonyms
- Rallus philippensis Linnaeus, 1766 (protonym); Hypotaenidia philippensis (Linnaeus, 1766); Gallirallus sharpei (Buttikofer, 1893)

= Buff-banded rail =

Species of bird

The buff-banded rail (Gallirallus philippensis) is a distinctively coloured, highly dispersive, medium-sized rail of the rail family, Rallidae. This species comprises several subspecies found throughout much of Australasia and the south-west Pacific region, including the Philippines (where it is known as tikling), New Guinea, Australia, New Zealand (where it is known as the banded rail, or moho-pererū in Māori), and numerous smaller islands, covering a range of latitudes from the tropics to the subantarctic. The species was formerly placed in the genus Hypotaenidia.

== Taxonomy ==
In 1760 the French zoologist Mathurin Jacques Brisson described and illustrated the buff-banded rail in his multi-volume Ornithologie based on a specimen collected in the Philippines. He used the French name Le rasle rayé des Philippines and the Latin name Rallus Philippensis Striatus. Although Brisson coined Latin names, these do not conform to the binomial system and are not recognised by the International Commission on Zoological Nomenclature. When in 1766 the Swedish naturalist Carl Linnaeus updated his Systema Naturae for the twelfth edition he added 240 species that had been previously described by Brisson in his Ornithologie. One of these was the buff-banded rail. Linnaeus included a terse description, coined the binomial name Rallus philippensis and cited Brisson's work. The buff-banded rail was formerly placed in the genus Hypotaenidia but is now placed in the genus Gallirallus that was introduced by Frédéric de Lafresnaye in 1841.

=== Subspecies ===
Numerous subspecies are recognised for the buff-banded rail because of repeated dispersion of birds to islands in the Pacific, often followed by founder effects and reduced potential for gene flow. The weka in New Zealand evolved from a lineage with common ancestry to modern buff-tailed banded rail populations, and has changed over time to become flightless.

Twenty subspecies are recognised:

- G. p. andrewsi (Mathews, 1911) – Cocos Islands (southeast Indian Ocean)
- G. p. xerophila van Bemmel & Hoogerwerf, 1940 – Gunungapi Wetar (Banda Sea)
- G. p. wilkinsoni (Mathews, 1911) – Flores (central Lesser Sunda Islands)
- G. p. philippensis (Linnaeus, 1766) – Philippines (except Palawan, and Zamboanga Peninsula through Sulu Archipelago), Borneo, Sulawesi and satellites, Bali and Lesser Sunda Islands
- G. p. pelewensis Mayr, 1933 – Palau (west Caroline Islands, west Micronesia)
- G. p. anachoretae (Mayr, 1949) – Kaniet Islands (northwest of Manus Island, Admiralty Islands, northwest Bismarck Archipelago)
- G. p. admiralitatis Stresemann, 1929 – Admiralty Islands (northwest Bismarck Archipelago)
- G. p. praedo (Mayr, 1949) – Skoki (Admiralty Islands, northwest Bismarck Archipelago)
- G. p. lesouefi (Mathews, 1911) – New Hanover Island, New Ireland, Tabar and Tanga (northeast Bismarck Archipelago)
- G. p. meyeri Hartert, EJO, 1930 – Witu and New Britain (southeast Bismarck Archipelago)
- G. p. christophori (Mayr, 1938) – Solomon Islands
- G. p. sethsmithi (Mathews, 1911) – Vanuatu and Fiji (probably extinct Viti Levu and Vanua Levu; southwest Polynesia)
- G. p. swindellsi (Mathews, 1911) – New Caledonia including Loyalty Islands
- G. p. goodsoni (Mathews, 1911) – Samoa and Niue (central south Polynesia)
- G. p. ecaudata (Miller, JF, 1783) – Tonga (central south Polynesia)
- G. p. assimilis (Gray, GR, 1843) – north North, north South and satellites of Stewart is. (New Zealand)
- G. p. macquariensis (Hutton, FW, 1879) – Macquarie Island (far southeast of Australia) (extinct)
- G. p. lacustris (Mayr, 1938) – northwest, northeast, central, southeast New Guinea and Long Island (north of northeast New Guinea)
- G. p. tounelieri (Schodde & Naurois, 1982) – Coral Sea Islands (southeast New Guinea to north New Caledonia)
- G. p. mellori (Mathews, 1912) – Moluccas, northwest, south New Guinea, Australia (except central, Tasmania) and Norfolk Island (far east of Australia)

== Description and habitat ==
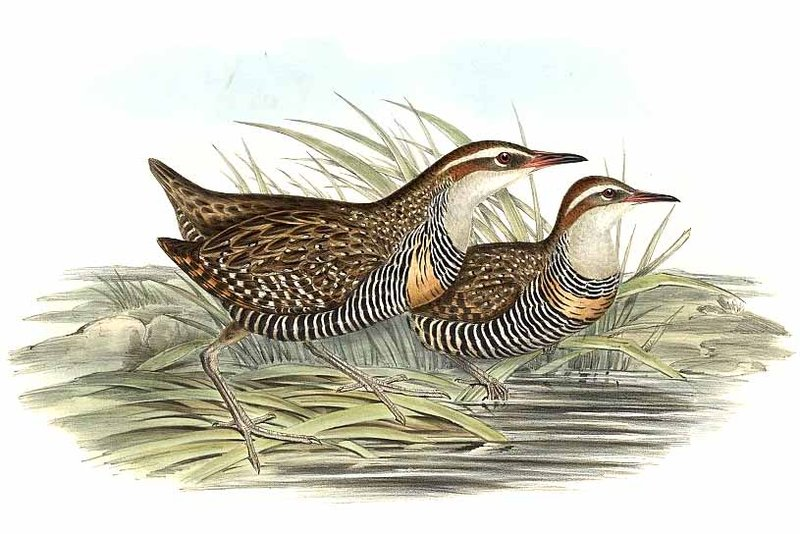
Painting by John Gould

The buff-banded rail is 25–33 cm (9.8–13.0 in) in length. It can weigh up to 303 g (10.7 oz), males average 185 g (6.5 oz) while females average 172 g (6.1 oz). Its wingspan is 40–52 cm (16–20 in).

In coloration, it has mainly brown upperparts, finely banded black and white underparts, a white eyebrow, chestnut band running from the bill round the nape, with a buff band on the breast. It utilises a range of moist or wetland habitats with low, dense vegetation for cover. It is usually quite shy but may become very tame and bold in some circumstances, such as in island resorts within the Great Barrier Reef region. It lives at elevations up to 3,600 m (11,800 ft).

== Behaviour and ecology ==
The buff-banded rail is an omnivorous scavenger which feeds on a range of terrestrial invertebrates and small vertebrates, seeds, fallen fruit and other vegetable matter, as well as carrion and refuse. Its nest is usually situated in dense grassy or reedy vegetation close to water, with a clutch size of 2–8. These eggs are incubated for 18–19 days by both parents. Chicks leave the nest soon after hatching and are cared for by both parents. Although some island populations may be threatened, or even exterminated, by introduced predators, the species as a whole appears to be safe and its conservation status is considered to be of Least Concern.

== Gallery and media ==
Lady Elliot Island, Qld, Australia

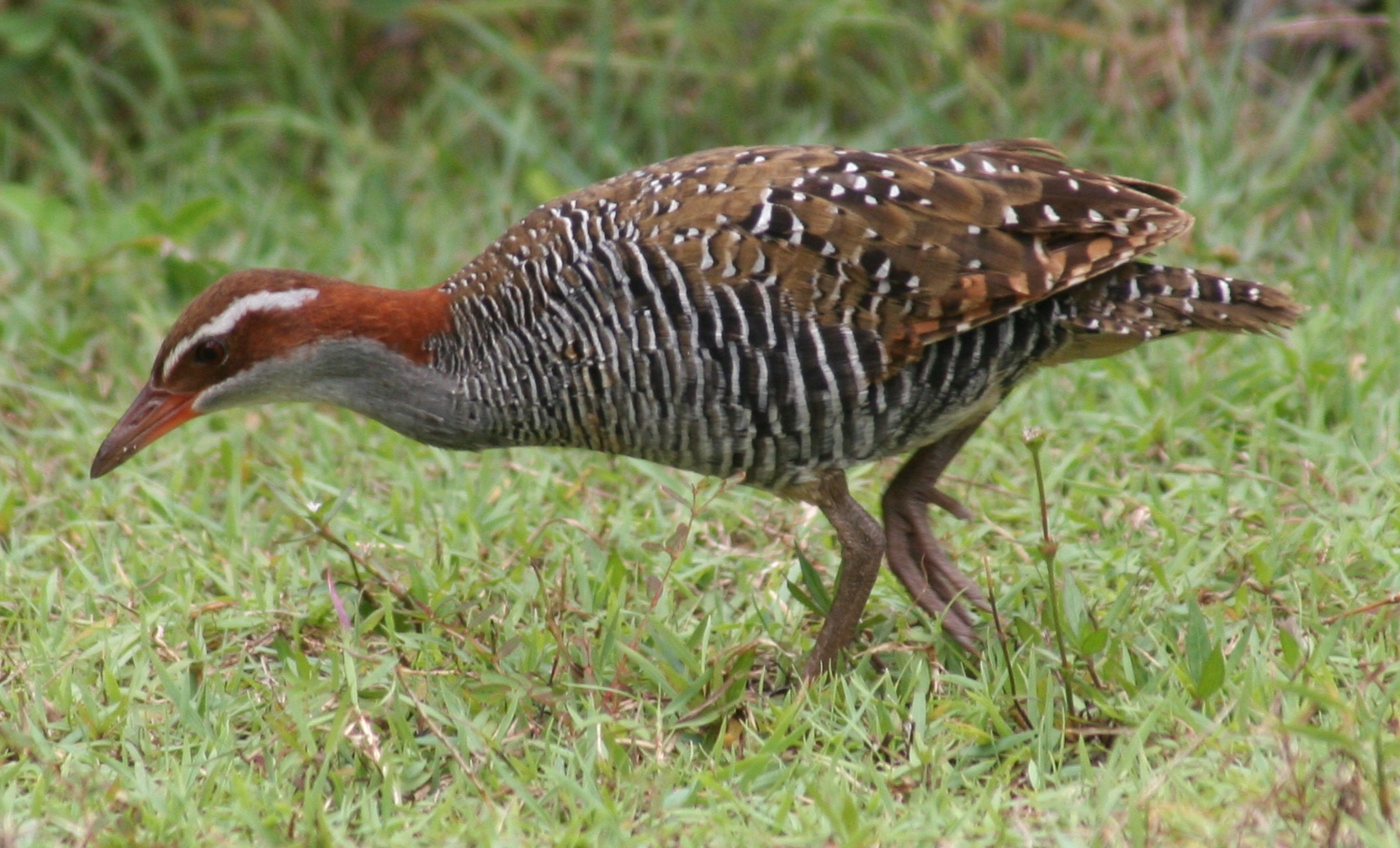
G. p. ecaudata, Fafa island, Tonga

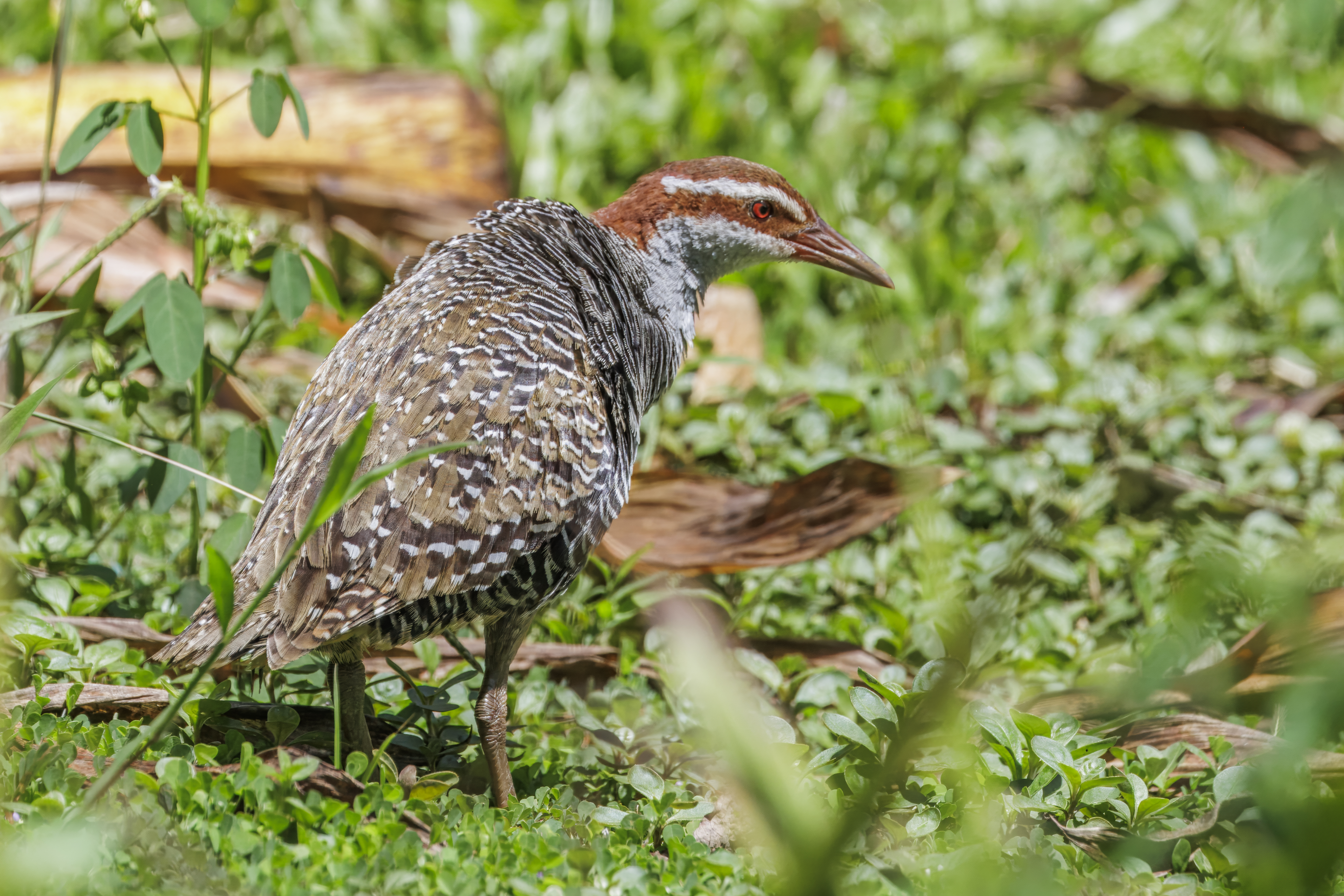
G. p. goodsoni, Samoa

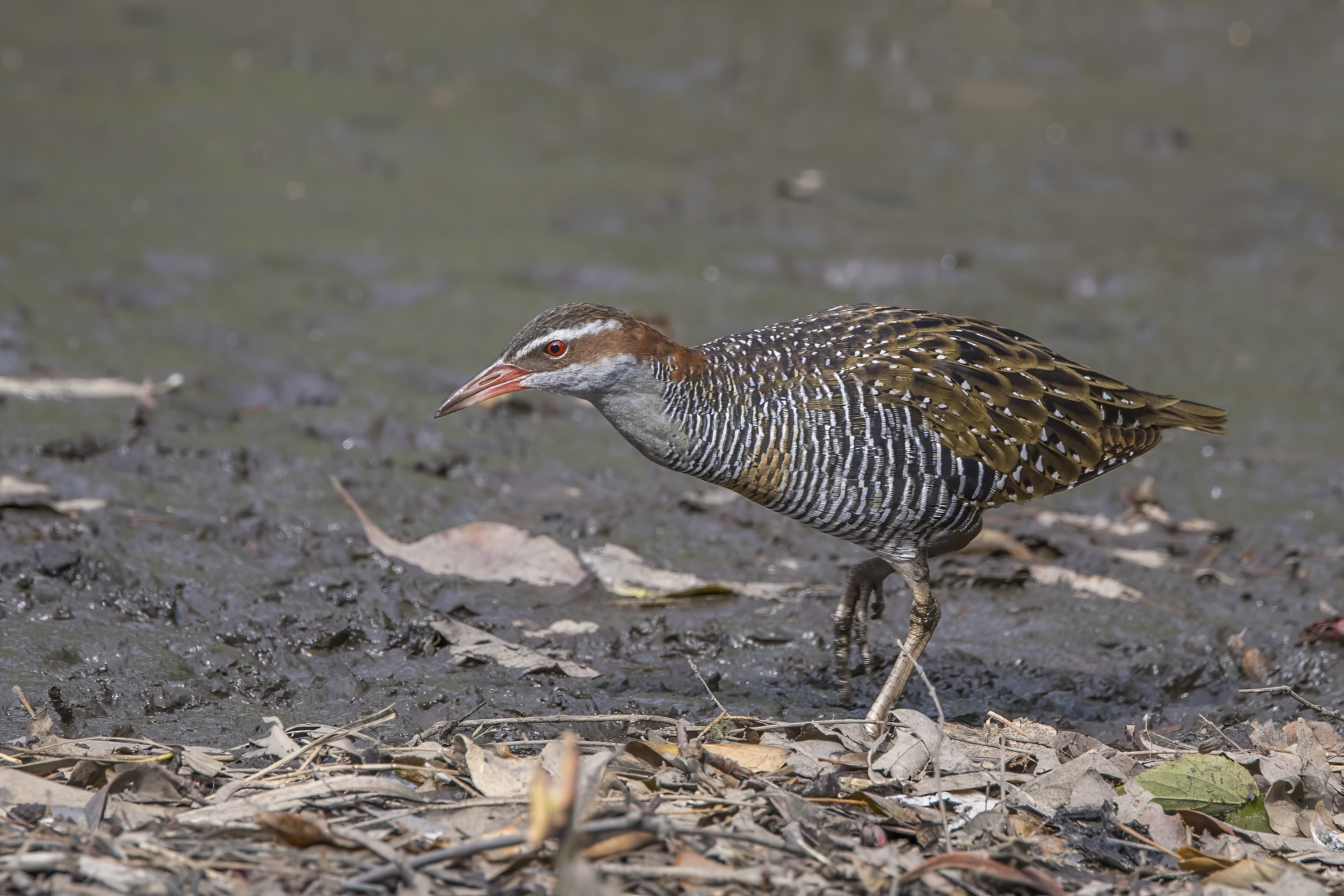
G. p. mellori, Adelaide

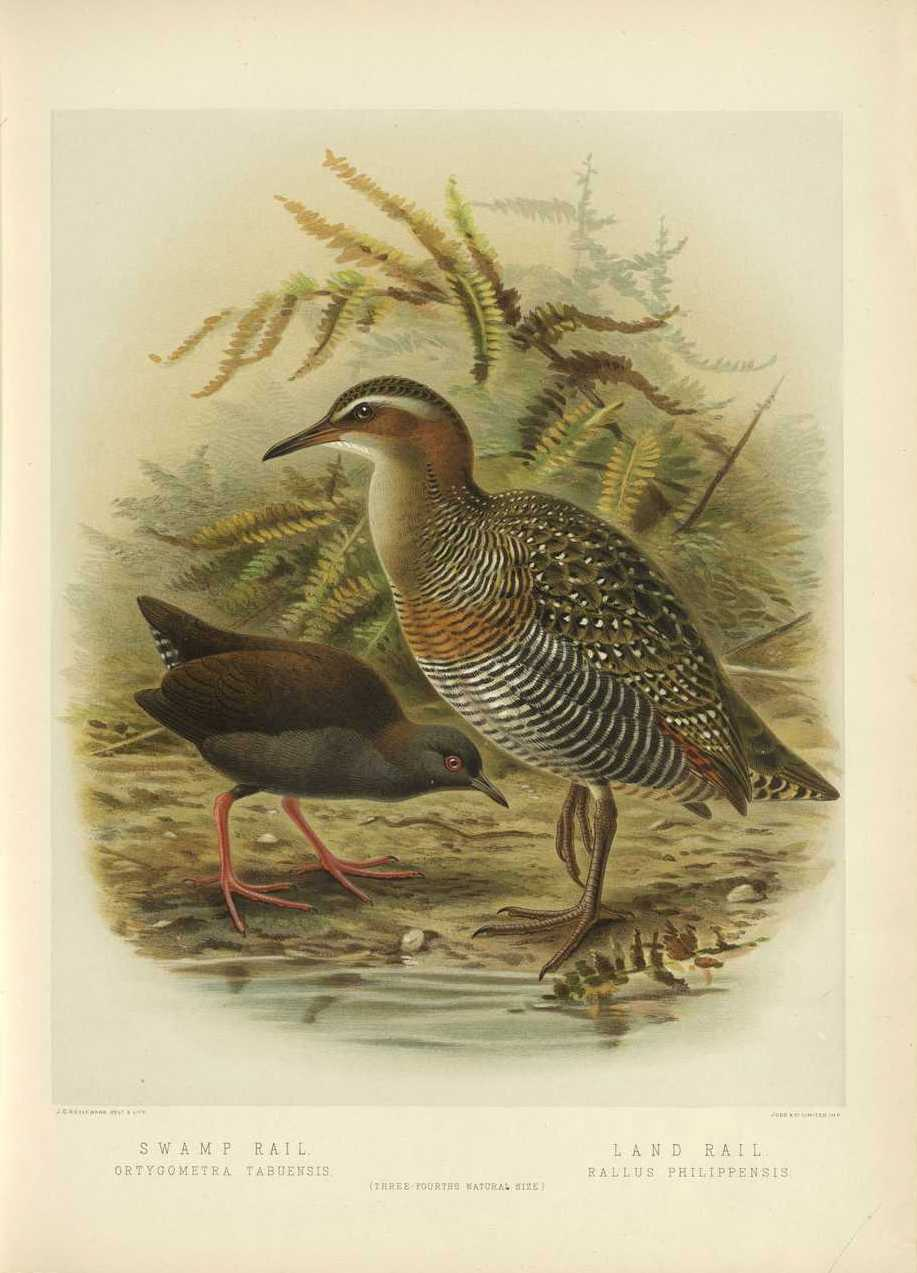
Extinct Caroline Islands rail Porzana monasa, left, with G. philippensis

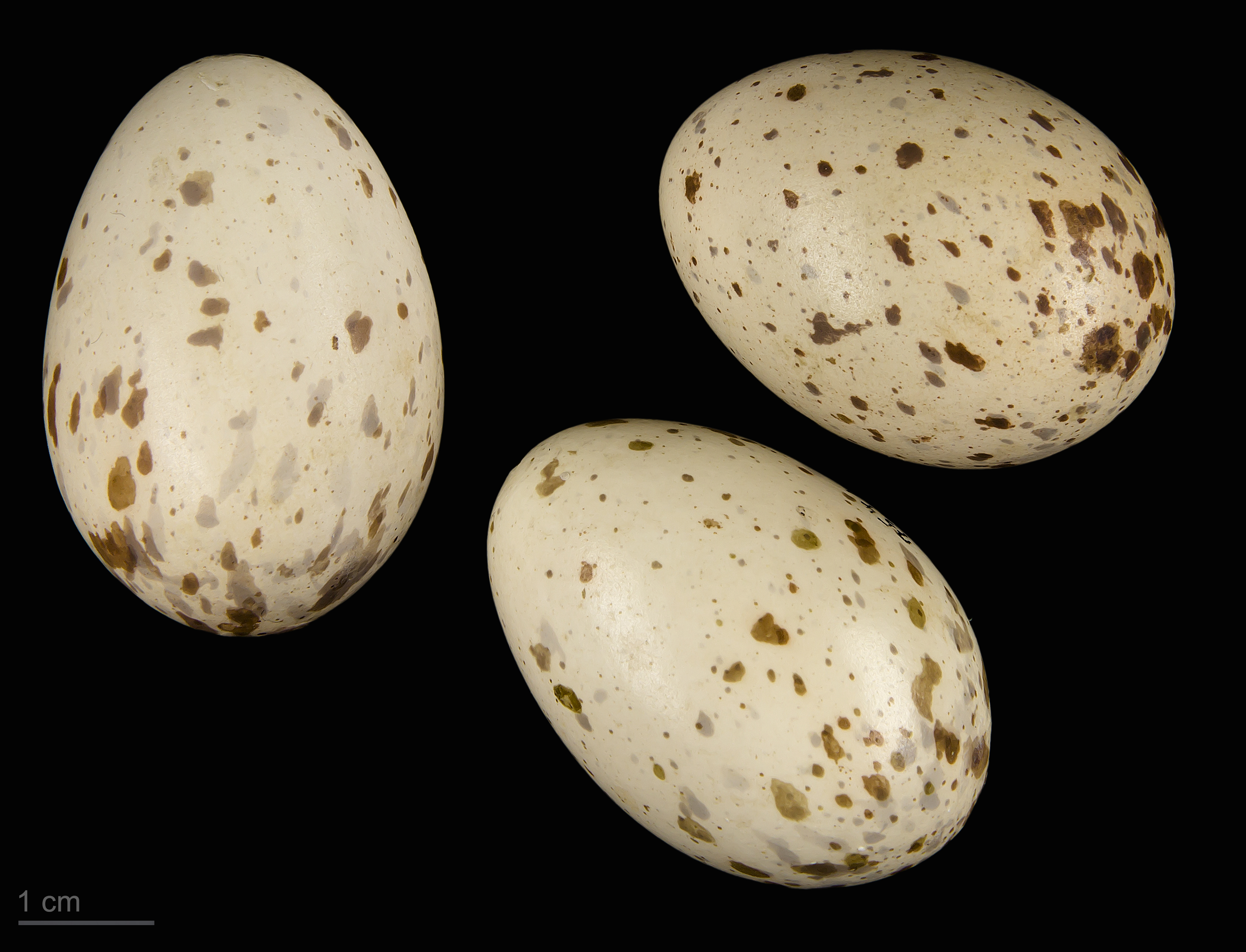
Eggs preserved in the MHNT
