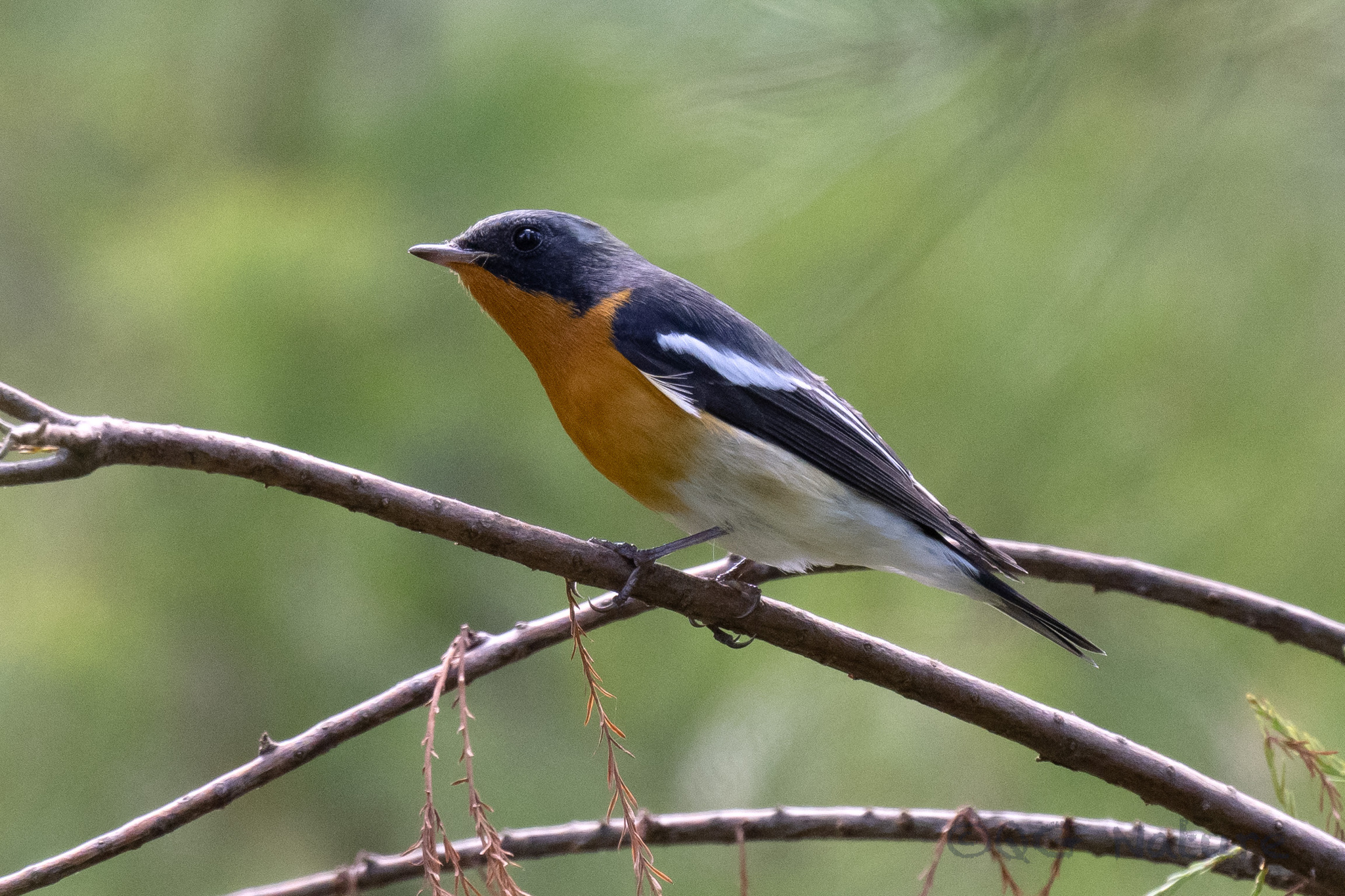

Conservation status
- Least Concern (IUCN 3.1)

Scientific classification
- Kingdom: Animalia
- Phylum: Chordata
- Class: Aves
- Order: Passeriformes
- Family: Muscicapidae
- Genus: Ficedula
- Species: F. mugimaki

Binomial name
- Ficedula mugimaki (Temminck, 1836)

= Mugimaki flycatcher =

Species of bird

The mugimaki flycatcher (Ficedula mugimaki) is a small passerine bird of eastern Asia belonging to the genus Ficedula in the Old World flycatcher family, Muscicapidae. The name "mugimaki" comes from Japanese and means "wheat-sower". The bird is also known as the robin flycatcher.

== Description ==
The mugimaki flycatcher is 13 to 13.5 centimetres long. It has a rattling call and often flicks its wings and tail. The adult male has blackish upperparts with a short white supercilium behind the eye, a white wing-patch, white edges to the tertials and white at the base of the outer tail-feathers. The breast and throat are orange-red while the belly and undertail-coverts are white. The female is grey-brown above with a pale orange-brown breast and throat. She lacks white in the tail, has one or two pale wingbars rather than a white wing-patch and has a supercilium that is either faint or absent entirely. Young males are similar to the female but have a brighter orange breast, white in the tail and a more obvious supercilium.

== Distribution and habitat ==
It breeds in eastern Siberia and north-east China. Migrating birds pass through eastern China, Korea and Japan in spring and autumn. The species winters in Southeast Asia, reaching western Indonesia and the Philippines. There is a single record of a vagrant bird in Alaska; on Shemya Island in 1985. A bird in Humberside, England in 1991 was not accepted into Category A, a wild bird, but was put in a Category D, meaning likely to be of captive origin. It was retained in Category D following a review in 2009. After a third review in 2016 the bird was placed in category E.

The main habitats are forest and woodland, particularly at higher elevations. It is also found in parks and gardens during migration. It usually occurs alone or in small groups, feeding on flying insects in the tree canopy.

== Gallery ==
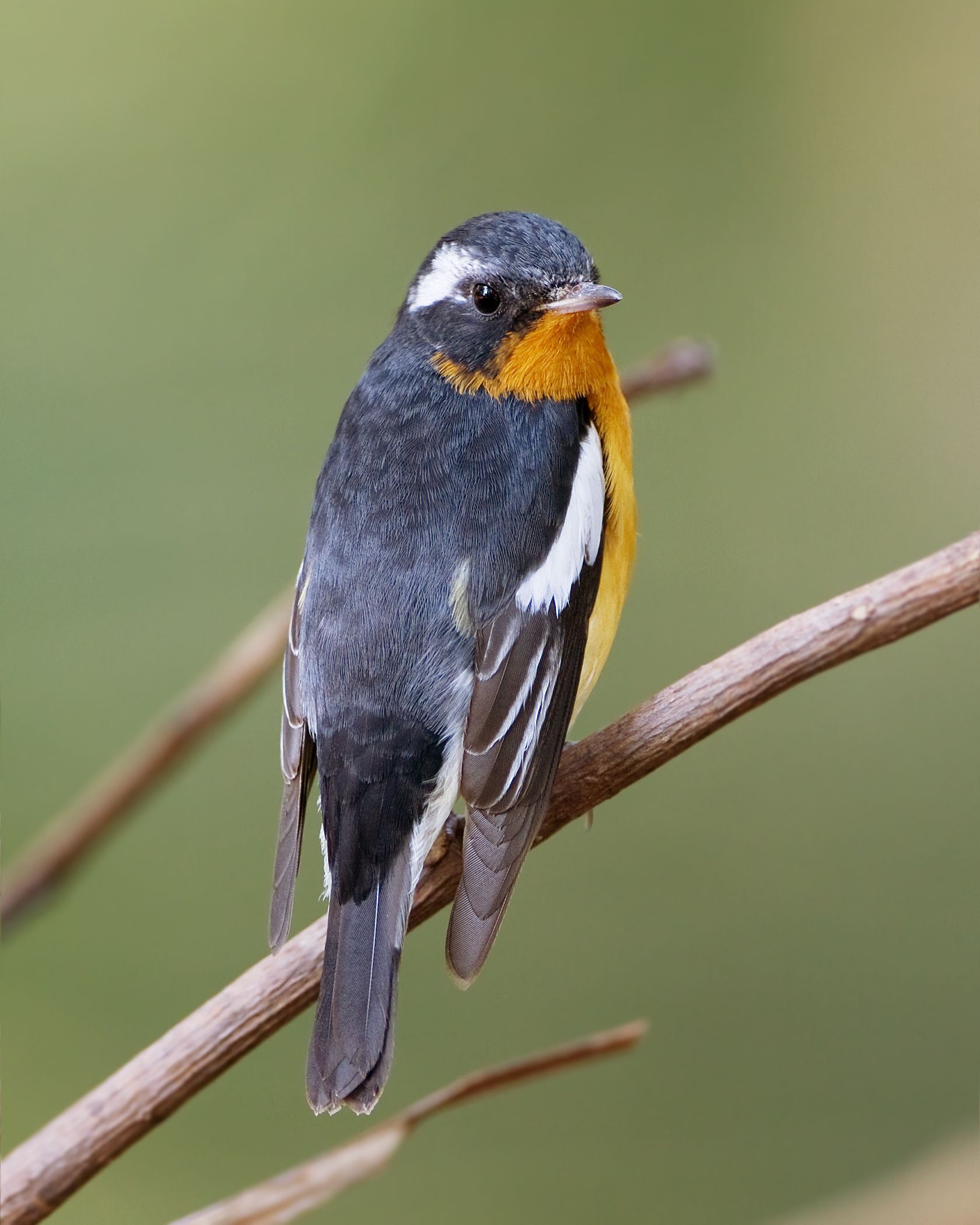

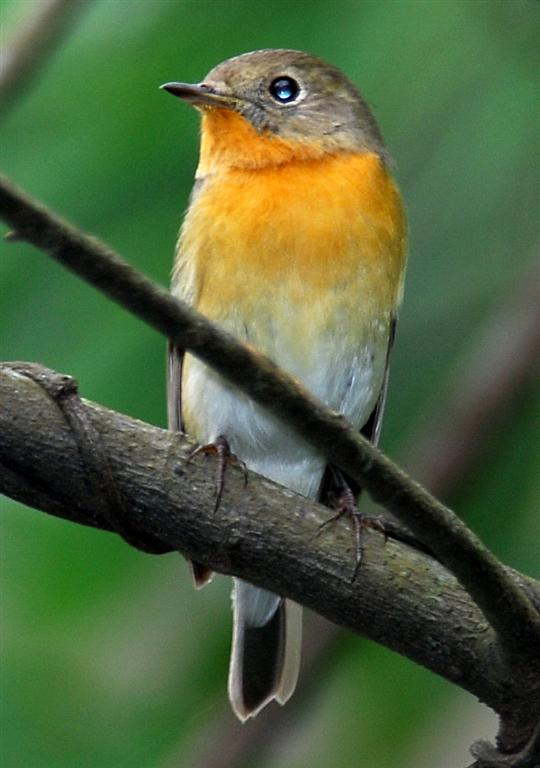
First winter male
