= Tliltocatl andrewi =

Scientific classification
- Kingdom: Animalia
- Phylum: Arthropoda
- Subphylum: Chelicerata
- Class: Arachnida
- Order: Araneae
- Infraorder: Mygalomorphae
- Family: Theraphosidae
- Genus: Tliltocatl
- Species: T. andrewi

Binomial name
- Tliltocatl andrewi (Schmidt, 1992), nomen dubium

Synonyms
- Brachypelma andrewi Schmidt, 1992

Species of spider

Tliltocatl andrewi (synonym Brachypelma andrewi) is a possible species of spider in the family Theraphosidae (tarantulas). The World Spider Catalog regards it as a nomen dubium (dubious name). Only the male has been described and its distribution is unknown.

== Description ==
Only a male preserved since 1875 has been described, initially incorrectly as Euathlus truculentus. Its body length is 55 mm; the fourth leg is longest at 67 mm. The general colour is blackish brown, with long orange-red hairs on the abdomen and legs. The femurs of the legs have bronze gold hairs. The palpal bulb has a wide embolus tapering to a point, typical of Brachypelma species (as then understood) as opposed to the long tapered embolus of Euathlus species.

== Taxonomy ==
In a study published in 1992, Andrew Smith described a specimen in the British Museum of Natural History believing it to be a male of Euathlus truculentus. He used his description to support the view held at the time that the genus Brachypelma was synonymous with Euathlus. However, shortly afterwards in 1992, Günter Schmidt realized that this specimen was not the same species as the type of Euathlus truculentus, but was in fact a new species of Brachypelma (as then understood), which he called B. andrewi after Andrew Smith. Smith accepted that he had been mistaken. As of September 2017, only this male has been described. The species was transferred to Tliltocatl, along with other species of Brachypelma, in 2020.

== Distribution ==
The label on the described specimen says "Cuba", but this is considered unlikely as its place of origin, the presumption being that it was purchased in Havana, Cuba.
