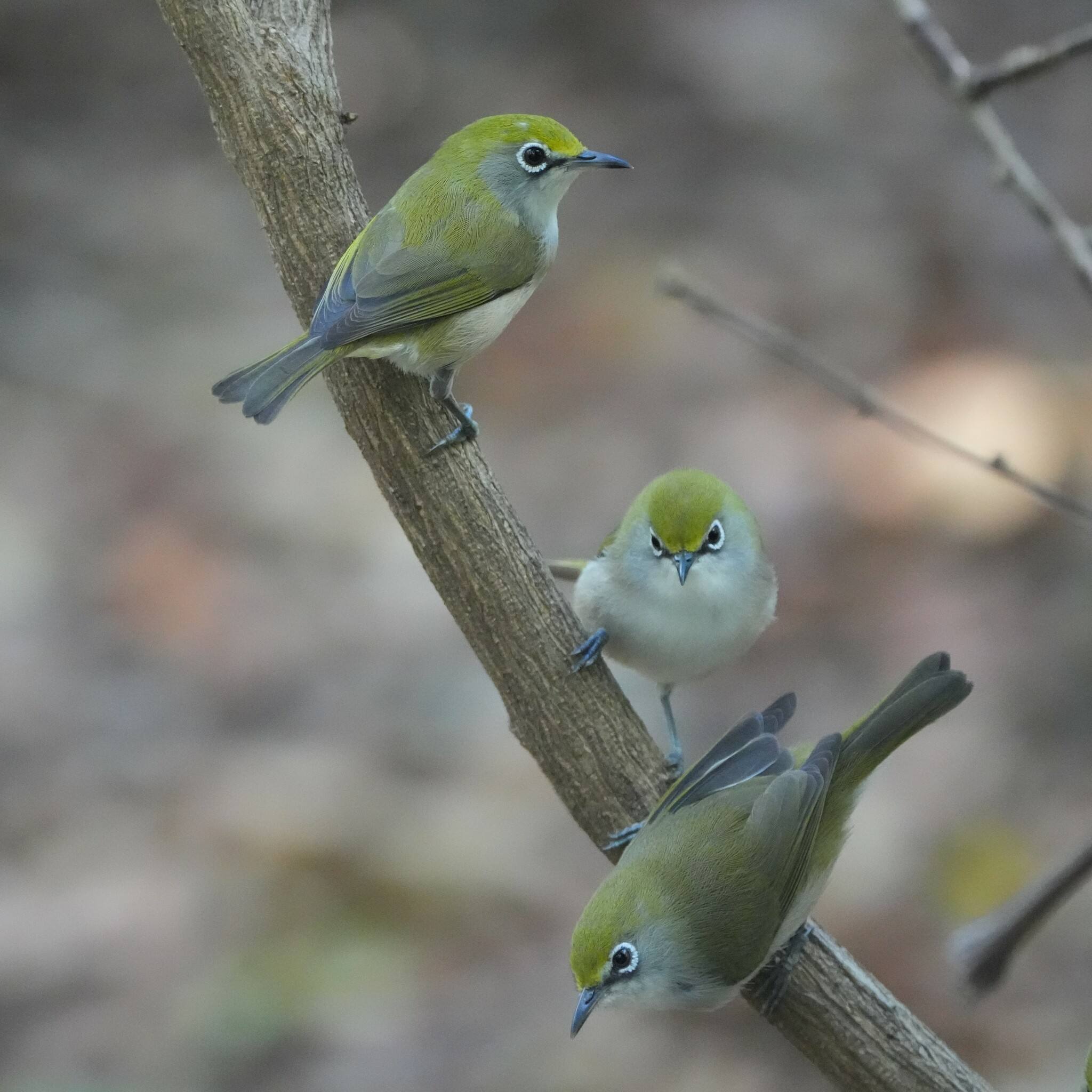

Conservation status
- Least Concern (IUCN 3.1)

Scientific classification
- Kingdom: Animalia
- Phylum: Chordata
- Class: Aves
- Order: Passeriformes
- Family: Zosteropidae
- Genus: Zosterops
- Species: Z. natalis

Binomial name
- Zosterops natalis (Lister, 1889)

= Christmas white-eye =

Species of bird

The Christmas white-eye (Zosterops natalis) is a species of bird in the family Zosteropidae. It is endemic to Christmas Island. Its natural habitats are tropical and subtropical moist broadleaf forests and subtropical or tropical moist shrubland. It is threatened by habitat destruction.

== Description ==
The Christmas white-eye has a length of between 11.7 and 13.5 cm (4.6 and 5.3 in). The upper parts are greyish-olive and the underparts whitish. There is a yellowish streak above the eye and a distinctive white feather ring surrounding the eye.

== Distribution and habitat ==
The genus Zosterops is an island specialist, with 82 of the 98 species being restricted to islands, and many species being known from only a single island. It is a highly successful group, having an unspecialised diet and a great dispersal capacity. The Christmas white-eye is endemic to Christmas Island, but it has also been successfully introduced to the Cocos (Keeling) Islands where it has become established, but mostly around human settlements. On Christmas Island it occurs in forests all over the island at altitudes up to about 360 m (1,200 ft), as well as in gardens, the vicinity of abandoned mines and weedy agricultural land.

== Behaviour ==
The Christmas white-eye has a varied diet including fruits, seeds, nectar and insects.

== Status ==
The invasive yellow crazy ant (Anoplolepis gracilipes) has had a dramatic impact on the biodiversity of Christmas Island. It has severely reduced and nearly eliminated the red land crabs and increased the presence of the stinging tree (Dendrocnide peltata) in the canopy. The increased populations of scale insects, which are tended by yellow crazy ants, have provided foraging opportunities for the white-eye and the resurgence of the ant has not deleteriously impacted the bird as was previously feared. The white-eye is a common bird with a stable population, and the International Union for Conservation of Nature has rated its conservation status as least concern. The subpopulation on the Cocos (Keeling) Islands is estimated to be about 5% of the size of the Christmas Island population, but it provides a second location which should reduce the risk that a natural disaster will cause extinction.
