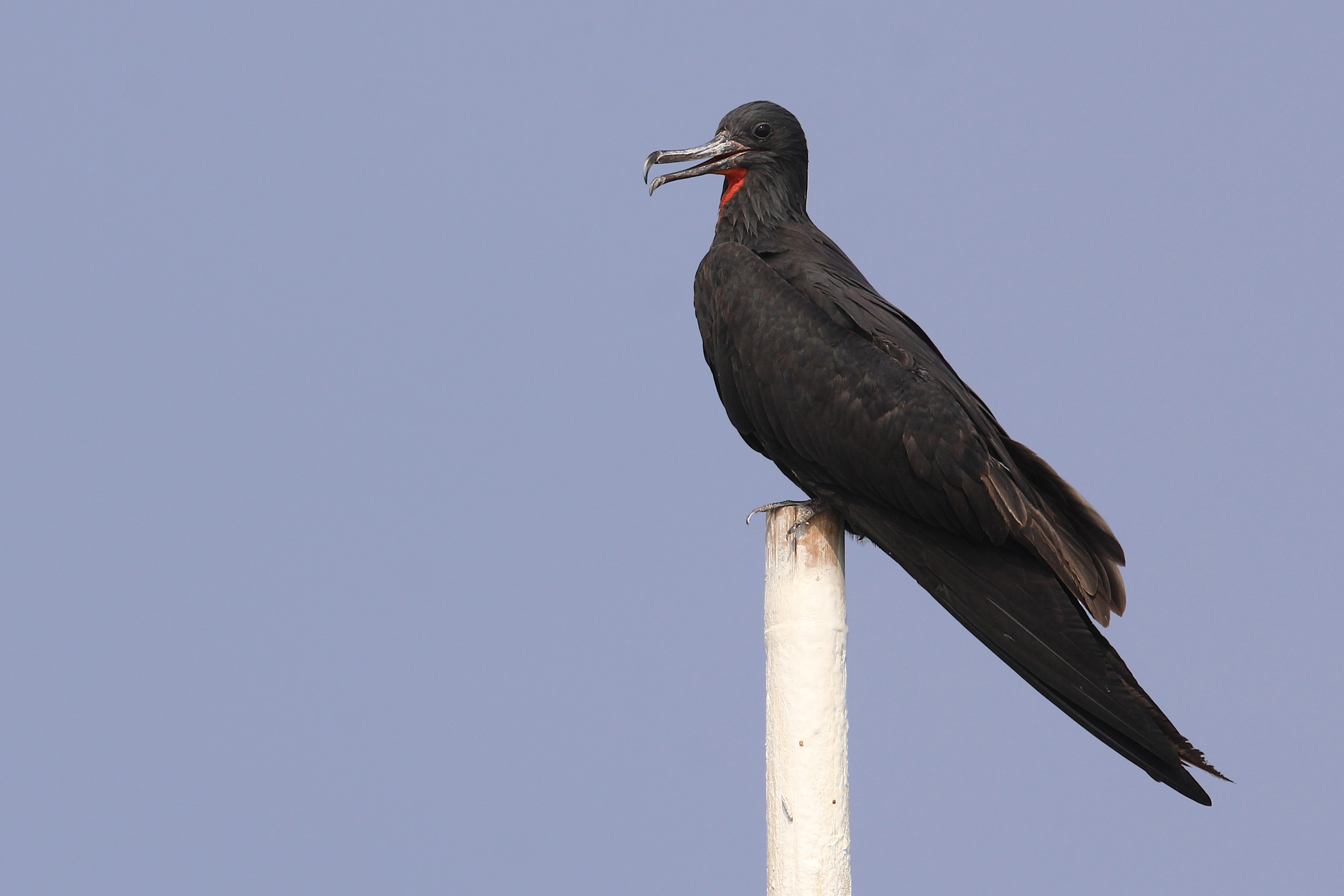

Conservation status
- Least Concern (IUCN 3.1)

Scientific classification
- Kingdom: Animalia
- Phylum: Chordata
- Class: Aves
- Order: Suliformes
- Family: Fregatidae
- Genus: Fregata
- Species: F. ariel

Binomial name
- Fregata ariel (Gray, GR, 1845)
- Range map

= Lesser frigatebird =

Species of bird

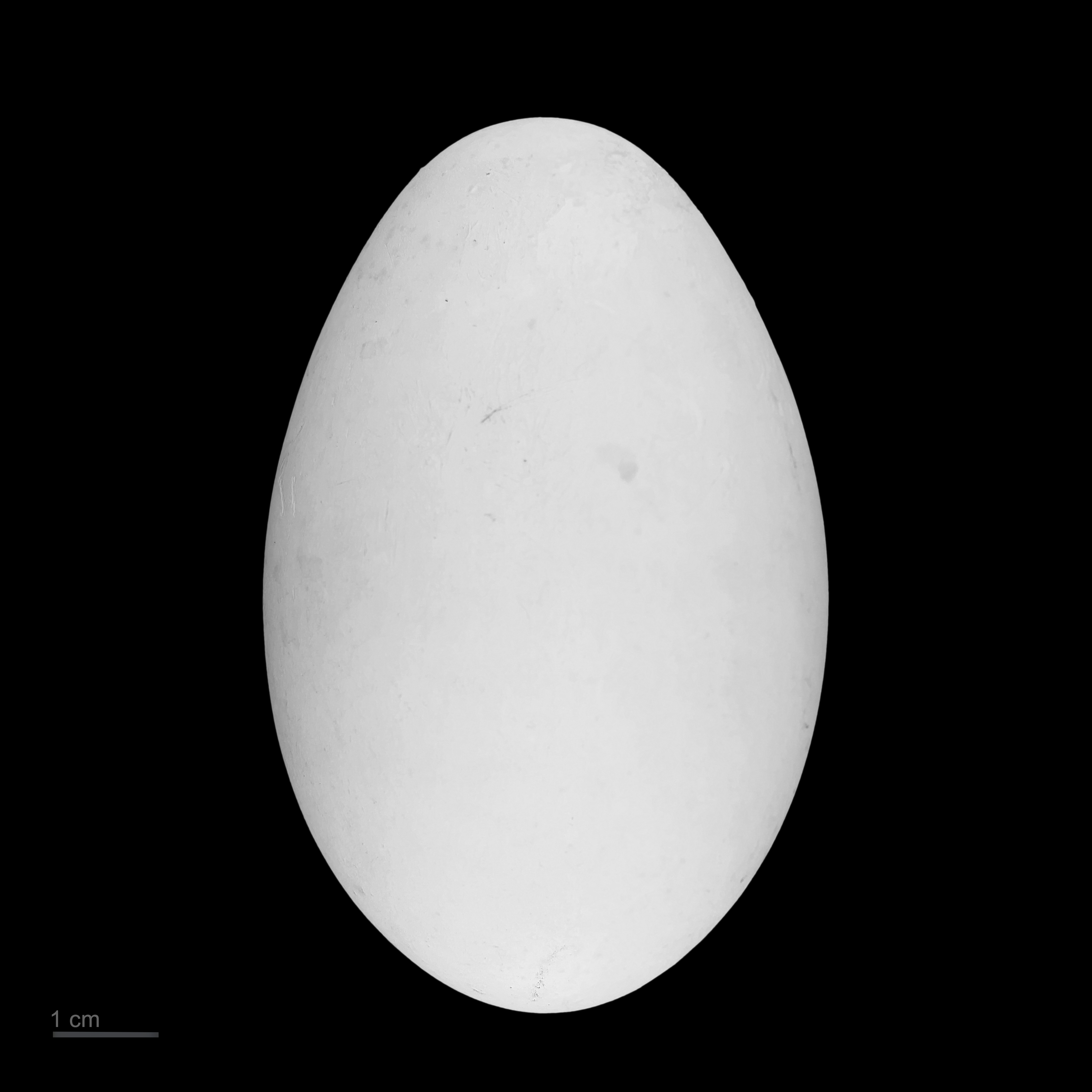
Egg of Fregata ariel - MHNT

The lesser frigatebird (Fregata ariel) is a seabird of the frigatebird family Fregatidae. Around 75 cm (30 in) in length, it is the smallest species of frigatebird. It occurs over tropical and subtropical waters across the Indian and Pacific Oceans, as well as off the Atlantic coast of Brazil.

The lesser frigatebird is a lightly built seabird with brownish-black plumage, long, narrow wings, and a deeply forked tail. The male has a striking red gular sac, which he inflates to attract a mate. The female is slightly larger than the male and has a white breast and belly. Frigatebirds feed on fish taken in flight from the ocean's surface (often flying fish), and sometimes indulge in kleptoparasitism, harassing other birds to force them to regurgitate their food.

== Taxonomy ==
The lesser frigatebird was first described as Atagen ariel by English zoologist George Gray in 1845 from a specimen collected on Raine Island, Queensland, Australia. The lesser frigatebird is one of five closely related species of the genus Fregata. The other four are the great frigatebird (F. minor), Christmas frigatebird (F. andrewsi), magnificent frigatebird (F. magnificens), and Ascension frigatebird (F. aquila). The genus is the only member of the family Fregatidae.

=== Subspecies ===
Three subspecies are recognised:

- F. a. ariel occurs in the central and eastern Indian Ocean, the seas off South East Asian, and from northern Australia to the west and central Pacific Ocean.
- F. a. iredalei named by the Australian ornithologist Gregory Mathews in 1914. It occurs in the western Indian Ocean and breeds on the Aldabra atoll.
- F. a. trinitatis was named by Brazilian zoologist Alípio de Miranda-Ribeiro in 1919. It occurs in the South Atlantic off the coast of Brazil and breeds on the Trindade Archipelago. It has disappeared as a breeding bird from the main island, but very small numbers (less than 40 breeding pairs) remain on a small offshore islet.

Some ornithologists have questioned the validity of these subspecies, as they appeared to differ only in their size. Few museum specimens of the isolated Atlantic F. a. trinitatis exist, making comparisons difficult, but a comprehensive study published in 2017 found that it differed in both color of plumage and skeletal details, leading to the recommendation of treating it as a separate species (Fregata trinitatis).

== Description ==
The lesser frigatebird is the smallest species of frigatebird and measures 66–81 cm (26–32 in) in length with a wingspan of 155–193 cm (61–76 in) and a long, forked tail. Male birds weight 625–875 g (1.378–1.929 lb). Female birds are heavier and weight 760–955 grams (1.676–2.105 lb). Like all frigatebirds, the male has a large, red sac on the front of the throat, which is inflated during courtship. Courtship display also involves a variety of calls, bill rattling, and spreading of the wings. The male is mostly all black save for a white patch on the flank that extends on to the underwing as a spur. Males also have a pale bar on the upper wing. Females have a black head and neck with a white collar and breast, as well as a spur extending on to the underwing. The female also has a narrow, red ring around the eye. Juveniles and immature birds are more difficult to differentiate, but the presence of the spurs of white in the armpits is a helpful distinguishing sign.

Frigate birds are built for flying; they rarely swim and cannot walk, but can manage to climb around the trees and bushes in which they nest. They have a very light skeleton and long, narrow wings and are masters of the air. Their name probably derives from the fact that they harass other sea birds such as boobies and tropicbirds as they return to their nests from feeding, forcing them to disgorge their catch, which is then swooped upon and caught by the frigate birds before it reaches the water below. This practice seems to be more common among females, but probably only accounts for a fairly small proportion of the diet, which mainly consists of squid and flying fish scooped up from the surface of the sea.

== Distribution ==
Lady Elliot Island, Queensland, Australia

The lesser frigatebird is said to be the most common and widespread frigatebird in Australian seas. It is common in tropical seas, breeding on remote islands, including Christmas Island in the Indian Ocean in recent years. These birds are most likely to be seen from the mainland prior to the onset of a tropical cyclone, and once this abates, they disappear again.

== Breeding ==
Breeding seems to occur between May and December in the Australian region. They nest in trees (on Christmas Island) and both sexes contribute to nest building and incubation and feeding of the young. One egg is laid which takes 6–7 weeks to hatch. Fledglings are not left alone for another seven weeks or so for fear that they may be attacked and eaten by other birds, including other frigate birds. They remain in the nest for another 6 months or so until fledged, but they are cared for and fed by their parents for quite a long time after that.

== Status ==
The total world population is estimated to be several hundred thousand birds. At least 6,000 pairs breed on the Aldabra Islands in the Indian Ocean and another 15,000 pairs breed on islands off the north coast of Australia. The largest colonies are on the Phoenix Islands and Line Islands in the central Pacific. Nests placed on the ground are very vulnerable to predation by introduced species such as feral cats. The elimination of cats from Howland, Baker, and Jarvis Islands has led to the re-establishment and growth of colonies. Baker Island had no nesting lesser frigatebirds in 1965, but after the elimination of the feral cats on the island around 1970, the birds returned, and in 2002, about 16,200 individuals were recorded.

Because of its large overall population and extended range, the species is classified by the International Union for Conservation of Nature as being of least concern. In the South Atlantic, lesser frigatebirds (subspecies F. a. trinitatis) once bred on Fernando de Noronha, Saint Helena, and Trindade. The Fernando de Noronha and Saint Helena populations disappeared in ancient times and are only known from subfossil remains, estimated to be a few hundred years old. More recently, it disappeared as a breeding bird from the main island of Trindade, effectively restricting its known breeding range to a small, rocky islet off the main island. Whether it breeds on the Martim Vaz Islands, another part of the Trindade archipelago, is unclear. The main island of Trindade was once covered in forest, but after this was destroyed, overgrazing by introduced goats prevented any recovery. A series of eradication programs in the second half of the 20th century eliminated all the introduced vertebrates other than house mice. Feral cats that had seriously depleted ground-nesting birds were finally eradicated in 1998. The islands are part of a Brazilian military area, and the human population consists only of a few Brazilian Navy personnel, limiting easy access for ornithologists. In 1975–1976, ornithologist Storrs Olson visited the island and reported seeing a small colony of 15 nests on a rocky islet just off the southern coast. Ornithologists reported sightings in 1987 in the same general area as the 1975–1976 sightings, followed by a few sightings off the northeastern coast during a 1994–2000 seabird survey, and sightings of a minimum of six individuals in 2014 at the rocky islet of the 1975–1976 sightings. Combined, these sightings suggest that the remaining South Atlantic population is tiny, possibly numbering less than 20 breeding pairs. If recognized as a separate species, as proposed in 2017, this South Atlantic endemic qualifies as critically endangered. In Brazil, it is considered critically endangered.

== Gallery ==
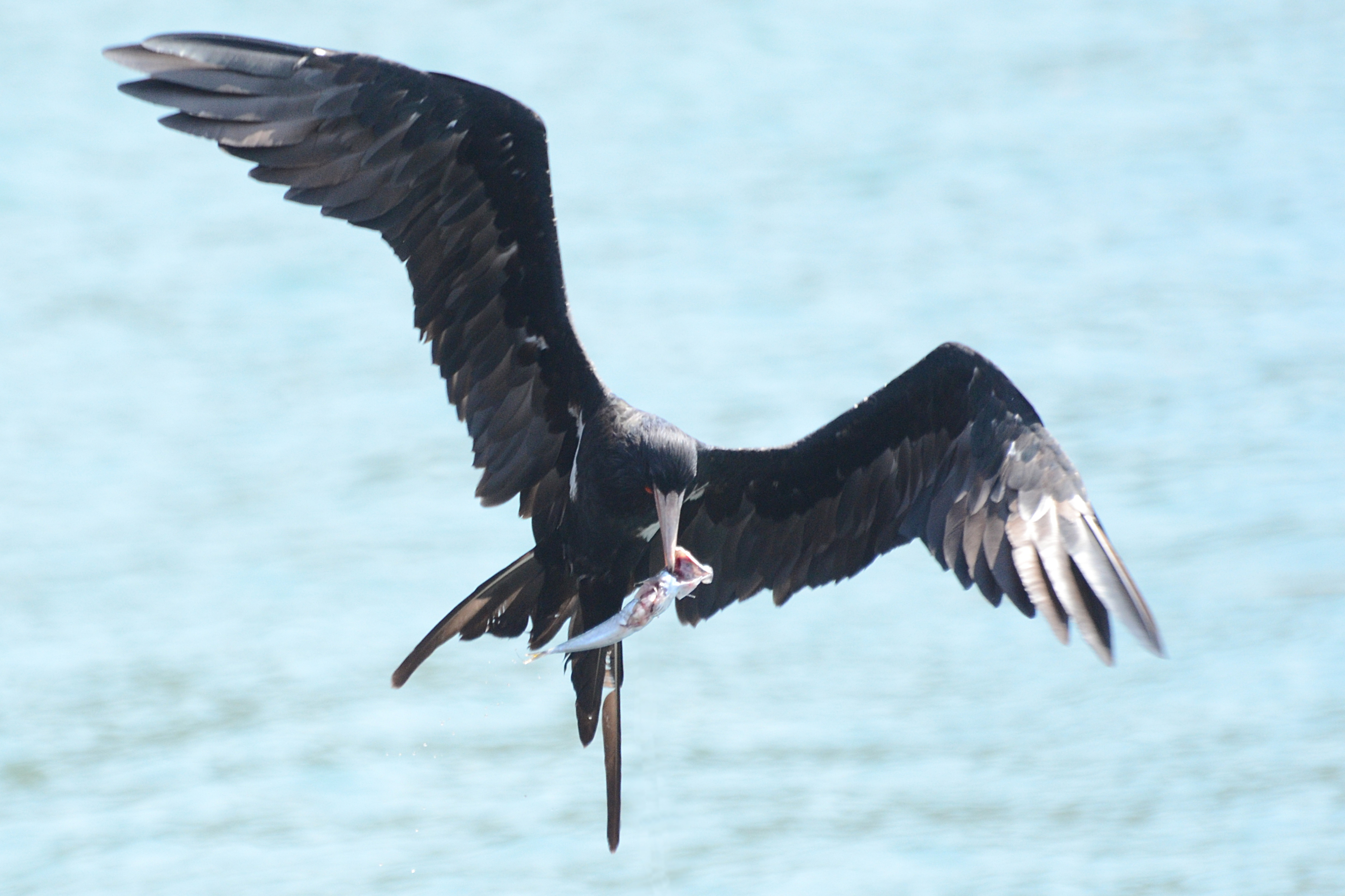

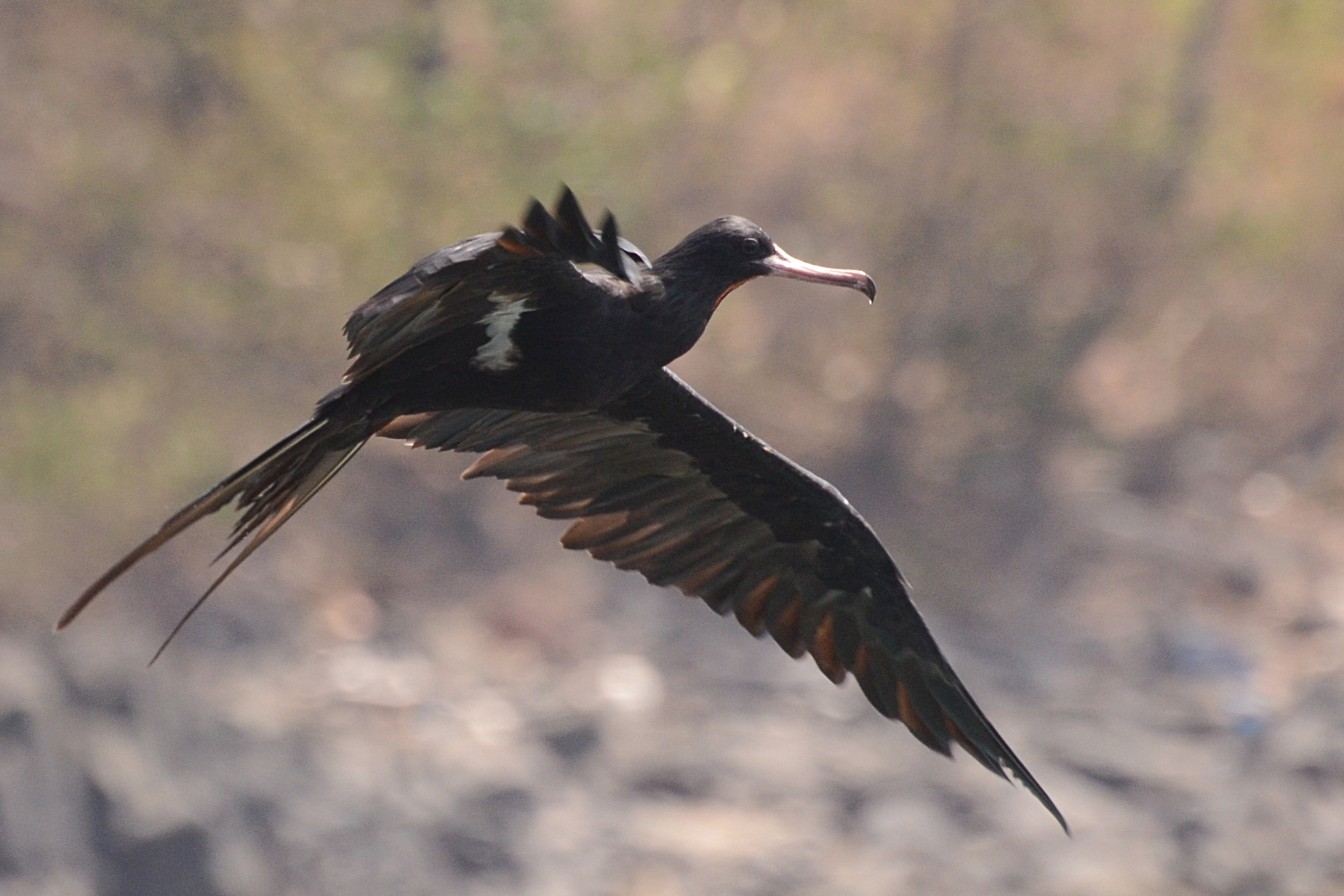

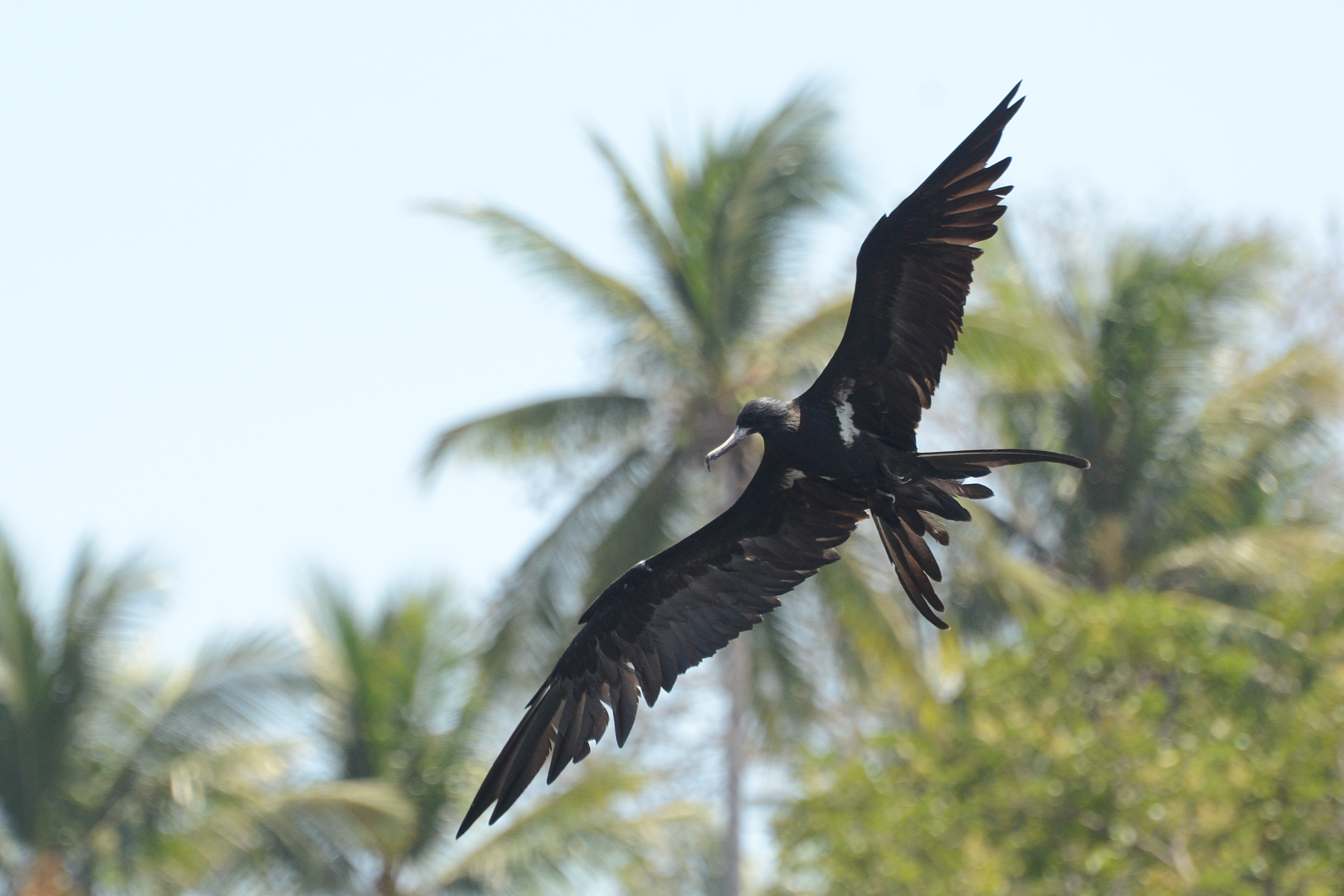

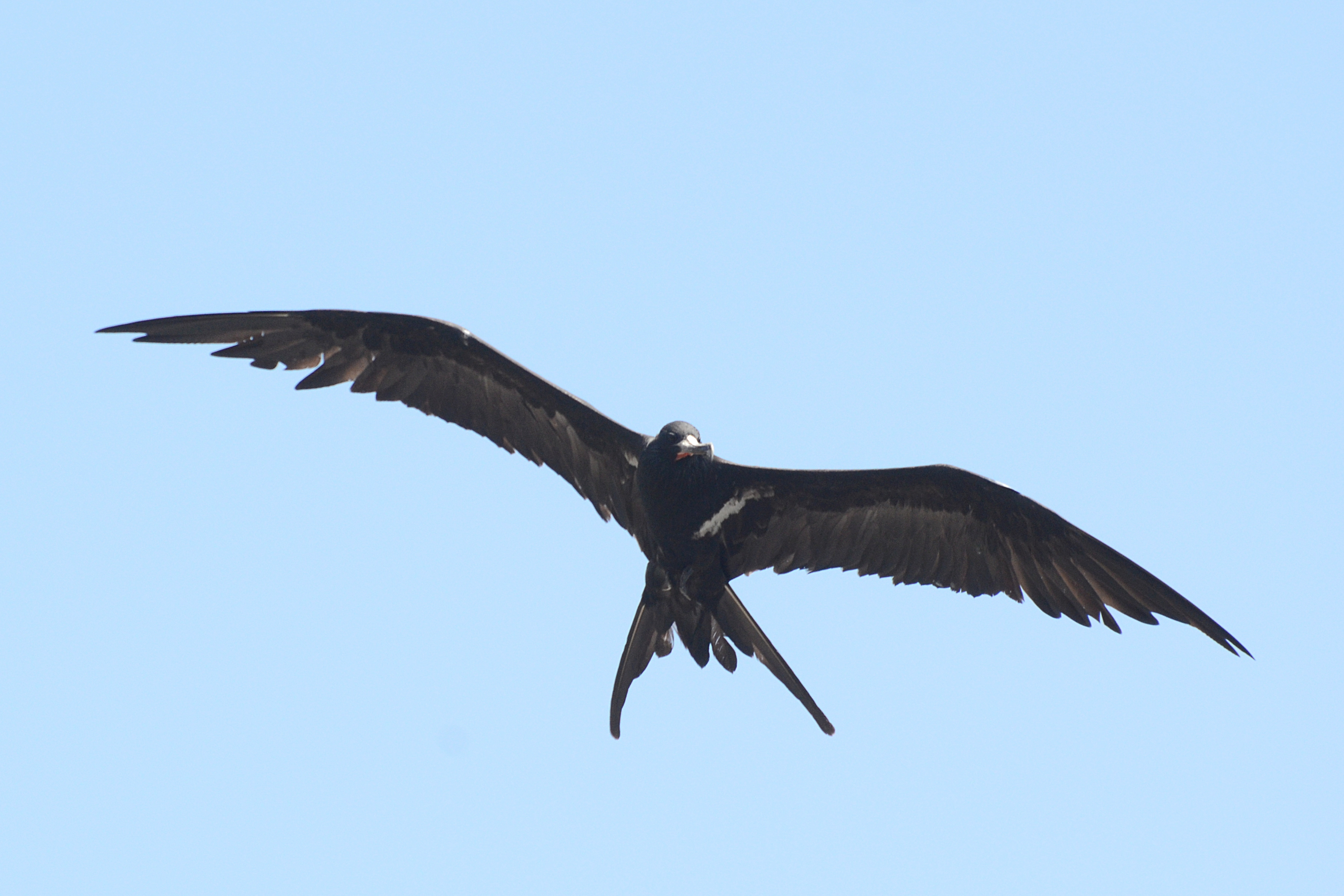
