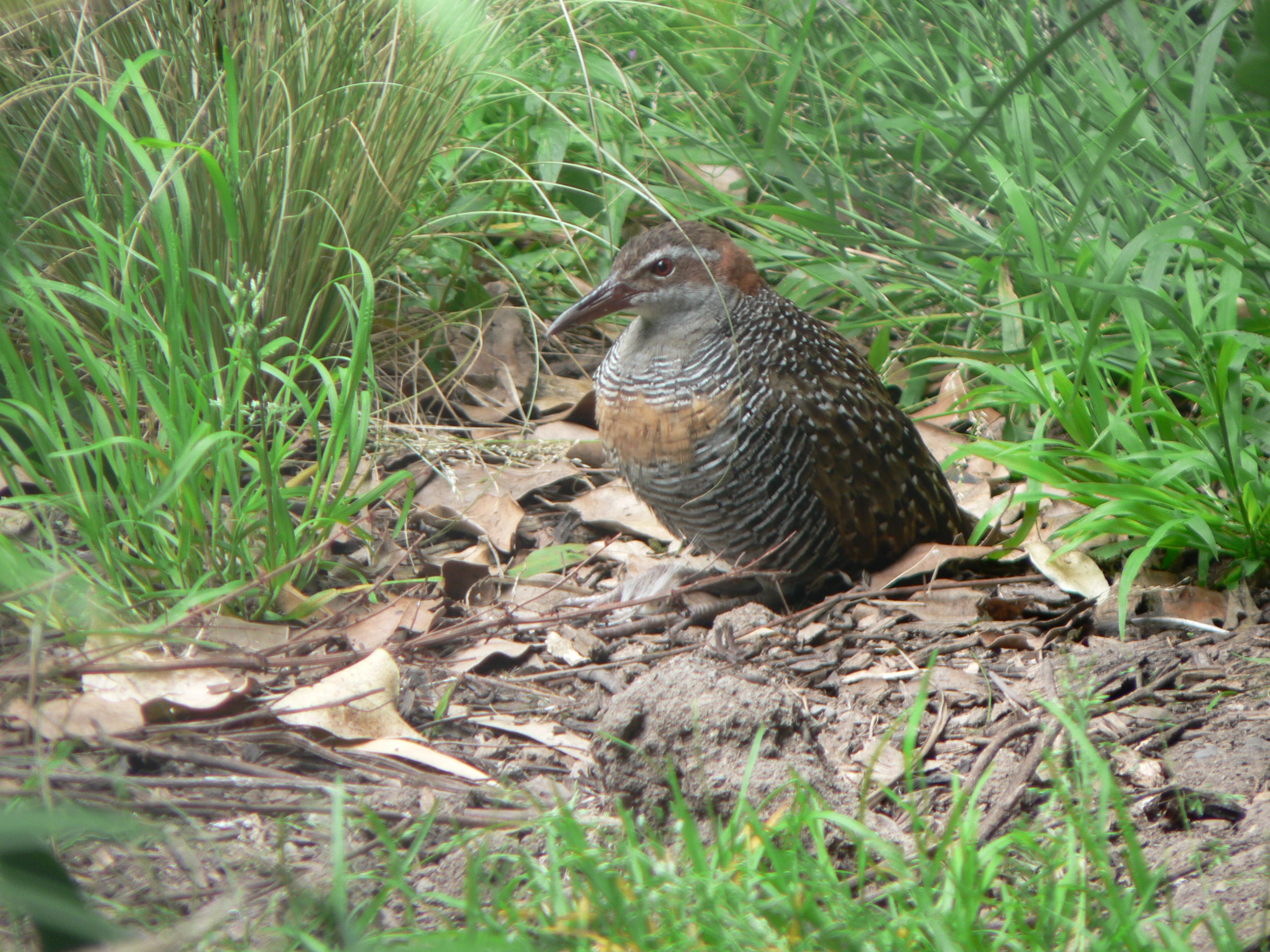

Conservation status
- Endangered (EPBC Act)

Scientific classification
- Kingdom: Animalia
- Phylum: Chordata
- Class: Aves
- Order: Gruiformes
- Family: Rallidae
- Genus: Gallirallus
- Species: G. philippensis
- Subspecies: G. p. andrewsi

Trinomial name
- Gallirallus philippensis andrewsi (Mathews, 1911)

= Cocos buff-banded rail =

Subspecies of bird

The Cocos buff-banded rail (Gallirallus philippensis andrewsi; Cocos Islands Malay: ayam hutan, lit. 'forest chicken') is an endangered subspecies of the buff-banded rail endemic to the Cocos (Keeling) Islands, an Australian Offshore Territory in the central-eastern Indian Ocean.

== Distribution and habitat ==
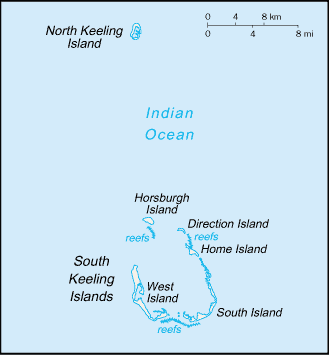
Map of Cocos (Keeling) Islands

This bird is now effectively limited to the 1.2 km² North Keeling Island. It is still occasionally reported from the 26 islands comprising the Southern Atoll of the Cocos (Keeling) Islands, where it was once common, but recent surveys have failed to find it. It is apparently extinct throughout the Southern Atoll apart from occasional vagrant birds dispersing from North Keeling, which have been unable to establish viable populations.

On North Keeling the rails occupy all the limited ground habitats, including the shore of the lagoon and the understorey vegetation of Pisonia forest and coconut palms. Population size is estimated as 850–1000 individuals, with a population density of 7–8 individuals/ha.

== Diet ==
The rails are omnivorous, foraging over the ground throughout the island and the intertidal fringe of the central lagoon for crustaceans, molluscs, insects, worms, seeds, fruits, eggs and carrion, as well as scavenging the refuse of the seabird breeding colonies.

== Conservation ==
The probable causes of extinction on the islands of the Southern Atoll are habitat clearance and predation by introduced mammals, including feral cats, black rats and humans, as well as competition with junglefowl. Threats to the only remaining breeding population on North Keeling are the introduced yellow crazy ant, the possibility of accidental introduction of terrestrial predators, and the impact of cyclones and tsunamis. North Keeling is entirely contained within the Pulu Keeling National Park, but the island is so small that reintroduction of the rail to one or more of the southern islands, after habitat preparation, is envisaged as a precautionary measure. The Cocos buff-banded rail is classified as endangered under Australia's Environment Protection and Biodiversity Conservation Act 1999.

As the only bird taxon endemic to the Territory, the Cocos buff-banded rail has featured frequently on postage stamps issued by the Australian Government for the Cocos (Keeling) Islands.
