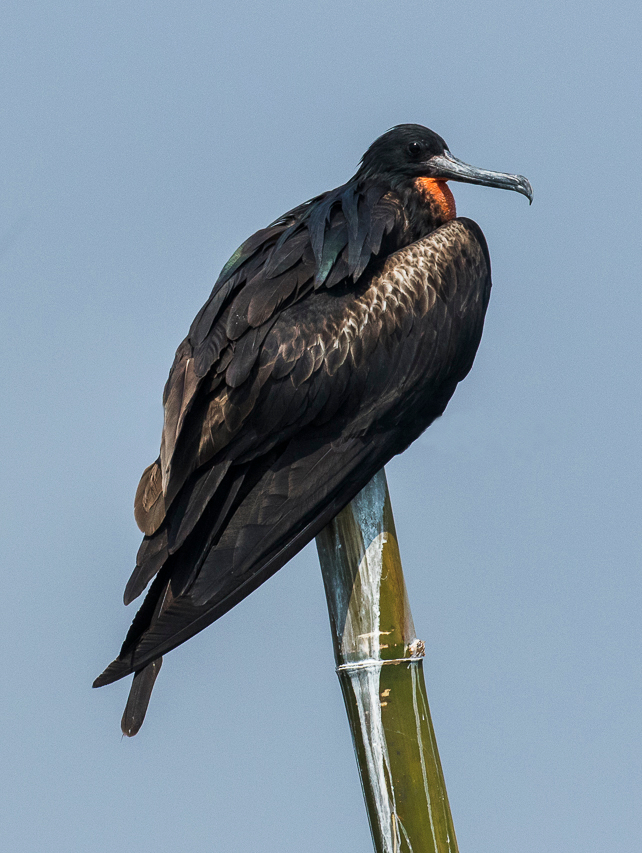
- Male at Jakarta Bay, Indonesia

Conservation status
- Vulnerable (IUCN 3.1)
- CITES Appendix I

Scientific classification
- Kingdom: Animalia
- Phylum: Chordata
- Class: Aves
- Order: Suliformes
- Family: Fregatidae
- Genus: Fregata
- Species: F. andrewsi

Binomial name
- Fregata andrewsi Mathews, 1914

= Christmas frigatebird =

Species of bird

The Christmas frigatebird (Fregata andrewsi) or Christmas Island frigatebird is a seabird of the frigatebird family Fregatidae which is an endemic breeder to Christmas Island in the Indian Ocean. Apart from the Ascension frigatebird, the three other species of frigatebird have much more widely distributed breeding locations.

The Christmas frigatebird is a large lightly built seabird with brownish-black plumage, long narrow wings and a deeply forked tail. It has a wingspan of around 2.15 m (7.1 ft). The male has an egg shaped white patch on his belly and a striking red gular sac which he inflates to attract a mate. The female is slightly larger than the male and has a white breast and belly. They feed on fish taken in flight from the ocean's surface (mostly flying fish), and sometimes indulge in kleptoparasitism, harassing other birds to force them to regurgitate their food. The species is listed as Vulnerable by the International Union for Conservation of Nature (IUCN).

== Taxonomy and systematics ==
The Christmas frigatebird was once considered to belong to the species Fregata aquila but in 1914 the Australian ornithologist Gregory Mathews proposed that the Christmas frigatebird should be considered as a separate species with the binomial name Fregata andrewsi in honour of the English paleontogist Charles Andrews. Of the four other species within the genus Fregata, genetic analysis has shown that the Christmas frigatebird is most closely related to the great frigatebird.

== Description ==
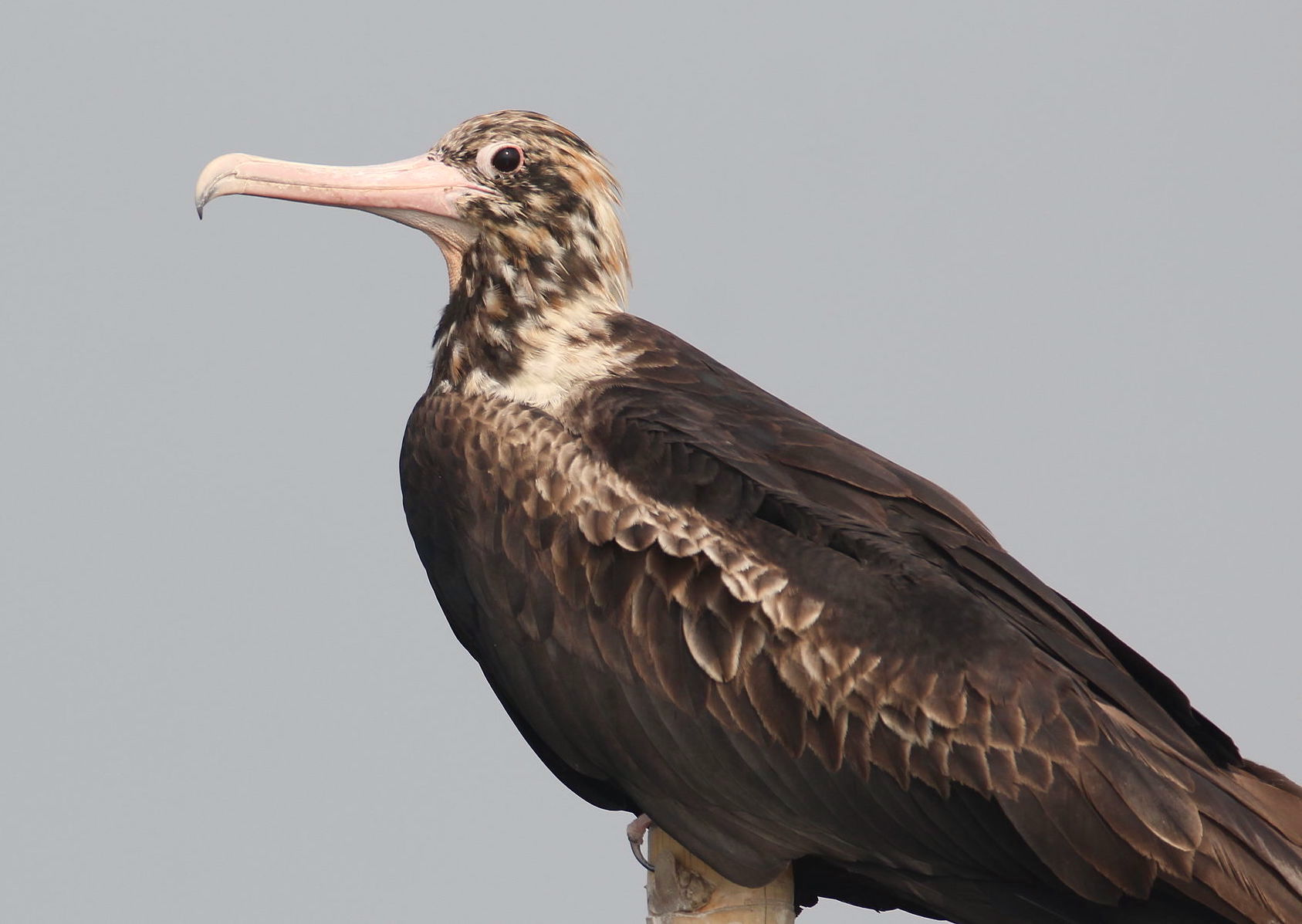
A juvenile at Jakarta Bay, Indonesia

The Christmas frigatebird measures 89–100 cm (35–39 in) in length, has a wingspan of 205–230 cm (81–91 in) and weighs around 1,550 g (3.42 lb). The adult male of this species is easily identified, since he is all black except for a white belly patch. Other plumages resemble those of the smaller lesser frigatebird, but have whiter bellies and longer white underwing spurs.

== Status ==
The Christmas frigatebird is endemic to Christmas Island and breeds in only four main nesting colonies. In 2003 there were 1,200 breeding pairs but as frigatebirds normally breed every other year, the total adult population was estimated to be between 3,600 and 7,200 individuals. The species has a small population and breeds on just one island. It was formerly listed as critically endangered by the IUCN, and is now listed as vulnerable. Populations, however, continue to decline due to persecution by fishermen, loss of breeding habitat associated with phosphate mining, marine pollution and entanglement in fishing equipment.
