= List of banks in the Cocos (Keeling) Islands =

The list of banks in Cocos (Keeling) Islands, Australia include

- Commonwealth Bank
- Investment banks:
  - ANZ Bank
  - Bank Mandiri (PT Bank Mandiri)
  - Westpac, etc.

== See also ==
- Banknotes of the Cocos (Keeling) Islands
