= Cocos Islands District High School =

School in the Cocos (Keeling) Islands, Australia

- Malay: Sekolah Tinggi Daerah Pulu Kokos

Location
- West Island and Home Island; 12°11′25″S 96°49′52″E

Information
- Type: Public co-educational combined day school
- Motto: Kerjasama dan Kejayaan ("Cooperation and Success")
- Educational authority: Western Australia Department of Education
- School code: 4157
- Principal: Kathleen Granger
- Staff: 18
- Years: K–10
- Enrollment: 102 (2021)
- Campus type: Suburban
- Website: cocosdhs.wa.edu.au.viper860.anchor.net.au/index.php

Cocos Islands District High School (Cocos Islands Malay: Sekolah Tinggi Daerah Pulu Kokos) is the only school of the Cocos (Keeling) Islands, an integrated territory of Australia. The West Island campus serves grades K–10 with separate primary and secondary wings while the Home Island campus serves grades K–6. It was founded in 1993 and falls under the jurisdiction of the Department of Education of the state of Western Australia.

== History and Demographics ==
Before the 1984 Cocos (Keeling) Islands status referendum, there was little formal education available in the Cocos (Keeling) Islands with most Cocos (Keeling) Islanders going direct into work. Even after voting for integration with Australia, most education offered on the island was limited to the first born child. Originally the school was run separately for primary and secondary students before the Western Australian Department of Education opted to merge the two campuses. As of 2019 about 80% of the pupils speak English as a second language. Most of the Home Island students are Cocos Malays; this differs in West Island since the majority of persons living there originated from the Australian continent. The school teaches in English as the medium of instruction. As of 2019 most staff reside on West Island, and those who teach on Home Island travel between the islands on a daily basis. The majority of staff live in residences owned and maintained by the Australian national government. In 2023, it was ranked as one of the poorest schools under Western Australian jurisdiction.
