= Danie Olbio =

Cocos (Keeling) Islands librarian and women's rights activist

Danie Olbio, also Nek Namira is a librarian and women's rights activist from the Cocos (Keeling) Islands. She is a librarian on Home Island and is chairperson of Kaum Ibu (Women's Group). In 2015 she was secretary of Persatuan Kebudayaan Pulu Kokos.
