= List of countries and dependencies by population =

Population distribution by country in June–July 2025:
1. India (17.3%)
2. China (17.0%)
3. United States (4.10%)
4. Indonesia (3.50%)
5. Pakistan (2.90%)
6. Nigeria (2.70%)
7. Brazil (2.60%)
8. Bangladesh (2.10%)
9. Russia (1.80%)
10. Other countries (46.0%)

As of 2026, the most populous country in the world is India, followed closely by China, with both exceeding 1.4 billion.

== Method ==
This list includes sovereign states, inhabited dependent territories and, in some cases, constituent countries of sovereign states, with inclusion within the list being primarily based on the ISO standard ISO 3166-1. For instance, the United Kingdom is considered a single entity, while the constituent countries of the Kingdom of the Netherlands are considered separately. In addition, this list includes certain states with limited recognition not found in ISO 3166-1. Also given in a percentage is each country's population compared with the world population, which the United Nations estimated at 8.232 billion as of 2025.

Figures used in this chart are based on the most up-to-date estimates or projections by the national census authority, where available, and are usually rounded off. Where updated national data are not available, figures are based on the estimates or projections for 2024 by the Population Division of the United Nations Department of Economic and Social Affairs.

Because the compiled figures are not collected at the same time in every country, or at the same level of accuracy, the resulting numerical comparisons may create misleading conclusions. Furthermore, the addition of figures from all countries may not equal the world total.

Areas that form integral parts of sovereign states, such as the countries of the United Kingdom, are counted as part of the sovereign states concerned. Not included are other entities that are not sovereign states, such as the European Union, (Note: The European Union is a sui generis supranational union whose sovereign members delegate to it by treaty certain powers that are often exercised by sovereign states. Its combined population has been estimated at 447,319,916 on 1 January 2020, and it would be ranked 3rd if it were included in the list. It has 5.4% of the world's population — see "Eurostat-Tables, Graphs and Maps Interface（TGM）table". European Commission.) and independent territories that do not have permanent populations, such as the Chagos Archipelago and various countries' claims to Antarctica.

== List ==
Note: A numbered rank is assigned to the 197 states listed as sovereign in United Nations reports and lists, which includes the 193 member states of the United Nations, plus the 2 observer states to the United Nations General Assembly (Holy See/Vatican City and Palestine) and two non-member states (Cook Islands and Niue). Dependent territories and constituent countries that are parts of sovereign states are not assigned a numbered rank. In addition, sovereign states with limited recognition are also included, but not assigned a numbered rank.

List of countries and territories by total population
Location	Population	% of world	Date	Source (official or from the United Nations)	Notes
World	8,232,000,000	100%	13 Jun 2025	UN projection	
India	1,429,404,000	17.3%	1 Jul 2026	Official projection	(Note: Includes the population of the India-administered union territories of Jammu and Kashmir, and Ladakh.)
China	1,404,890,000	17.0%	31 Dec 2025	Official estimate	(Note: Referring to Mainland China; excluding China's special administrative regions of Hong Kong and Macau, which returned to Chinese sovereignty in 1997 and 1999, respectively.)
United States	341,784,857	4.1%	1 Jul 2025	Official estimate	(Note: Includes the 50 states and the District of Columbia, but excludes the territories of the United States.)
Indonesia	290,125,073	3.5%	30 Jun 2026	National annual projection	
Pakistan	241,499,431	2.9%	1 Mar 2023	2023 census result	(Note: Excludes the population of Pakistan-administered regions of the Kashmir; Azad Kashmir and Gilgit-Baltistan, which, according to 2017 Pakistani census, had a population of 4,045,367 and 1,492,924 respectively.)
Nigeria	223,800,000	2.7%	1 Jul 2023	Official projection	
Brazil	214,211,951	2.6%	1 Jul 2026	Official estimate	
Bangladesh	169,828,911	2.1%	14 Jun 2022	2022 census result	(Note: The Bangladesh Bureau of Statistics has a projection of 181 million for 2025, but this method derives from a base year of 2011. This same projection overcounted the population for 2022 by about 4.4 million.)
Russia	146,028,325	1.8%	1 Jan 2025	Official estimate	(Note: Includes the Republic of Crimea and Sevastopol, administrative areas on the Crimean Peninsula occupied by Russia. The population does not include the four annexed Ukrainian oblasts. The Ukrainian government and most of the world's other states consider the Crimean Peninsula, Donetsk, Kherson, Luhansk, and Zaporizhzhia parts of Ukraine's territory.)
Mexico	131,231,919	1.6%	30 Jun 2026	National quarterly estimate	
Japan	122,430,000	1.5%	1 Nov 2026	Monthly national estimate	
Democratic Republic of the Congo	116,452,162	1.4%	1 Jul 2026	UN projection	
Philippines	114,849,400	1.4%	1 Jul 2026	Official projection	
Ethiopia	111,652,998	1.3%	1 Jul 2025	National annual projection	
Egypt	108,613,296	1.3%	1 Jan 2026	Official estimate	
Vietnam	102,300,000	1.2%	31 Dec 2025	Official estimate	
Iran	87,134,000	1.1%	21 Mar 2026	Official estimate	
Turkey	86,092,168	1.0%	31 Dec 2025	Official estimate	
Germany	83,298,787	1.0%	30 Jun 2026	National quarterly estimate	
Thailand	70,250,751	0.8%	2025	Preliminary census results	
Tanzania	70,038,850	0.8%	1 Jul 2026	Official projection	(Note: Including Zanzibar.)
United Kingdom	69,487,000	0.8%	30 Jun 2025	Official estimate	(Note: Excluding the three British Crown Dependencies and the 14 British Overseas Territories, listed separately. Four British Overseas Territories are not listed due to a lack of permanent population. These are the British Antarctic Territory (an Antarctic territorial claim hosting only government officials and research station staff), the British Indian Ocean Territory (a military base), South Georgia and the South Sandwich Islands (hosting only government officials and research station staff), and the Sovereign Base Areas of Akrotiri and Dhekelia (a military base where permanent residency is limited to citizens of the Republic of Cyprus).)
France	69,081,996	0.8%	1 Jan 2026	Yearly national estimate	(Note: Including the integral 18 regions of France (including five overseas regions). Excluding France's five overseas collectivities: French Polynesia, Saint Barthélemy, Saint Martin, Saint Pierre and Miquelon, and Wallis and Futuna, and the sui generis collectivity of New Caledonia, which are shown separately. Clipperton Island (an uninhabited state private property of France) and the French Southern and Antarctic Lands (including several uninhabited islands and an Antarctic territorial claim hosting only government officials and research station staff) are not listed at all due to a lack of permanent population.)
South Africa	63,522,380	0.8%	30 Jun 2026	Official estimate	
Italy	58,949,500	0.7%	31 Jul 2026	Monthly national estimate	
Kenya	54,227,015	0.7%	1 Jul 2026	Official projection	
Colombia	53,399,171	0.6%	1 Jan 2026	Official projection	
Sudan	53,282,719	0.6%	1 Jul 2026	UN projection	
Myanmar	51,375,327	0.6%	15 Oct 2024	2024 census result	(Note: Does not include the Rohingya people. Some regions were estimated by satellite.)
South Korea	51,088,284	0.6%	31 Jul 2026	Monthly national estimate	
Spain	49,935,642	0.6%	1 Oct 2026	National quarterly estimate	
Algeria	47,400,000	0.6%	1 Jan 2025	National annual projection	
Argentina	46,466,688	0.6%	1 Jul 2026	National annual projection	
Iraq	46,118,793	0.6%	21 Nov 2024	2024 census result	
Uganda	45,905,417	0.6%	10 May 2024	2024 census result	
Afghanistan	43,844,000	0.5%	1 Jul 2025	UN projection (see note)	(Note: The last census was conducted in 1979. Sources disagree about the current population: The Afghani National Statistics and Information Authority gives an estimate of 35,695,527 for 2024.; The Encyclopædia Britannica gives an estimate of 36,432,000 for 2025.; The BBC gives a figure of 38.3 million for 2023.; The CIA gives an estimate of 40,121,552 for 2024.; The US Census Bureau provides an estimate of 49,552,566 for 2025.; All figures are mid-year.)
Canada	41,798,407	0.5%	1 Jul 2026	National quarterly estimate	
Uzbekistan	39,047,321	0.5%	15 Jan 2026	2026 census result	
Angola	38,778,554	0.5%	1 Jan 2026	National estimate	
Morocco	37,254,695	0.4%	1 Jul 2026	National annual projection	(Note: Includes the regions Laâyoune-Sakia El Hamra and Dakhla-Oued Ed-Dahab, the disputed territory of Western Sahara administered by Morocco and excluding Sahrawi Arab Democratic Republic (see Western Sahara conflict).)
Poland	37,221,000	0.4%	31 Aug 2026	Monthly national estimate	
Saudi Arabia	35,300,280	0.4%	1 Jul 2024	Official estimate	
Mozambique	34,958,973	0.4%	1 Jul 2026	National annual projection	
Malaysia	34,389,400	0.4%	30 Jun 2026	National quarterly estimate	
Ghana	34,378,768	0.4%	1 Jul 2026	National annual projection	
Peru	34,157,732	0.4%	4 Aug 2025	Census 2025	
Ivory Coast	33,293,101	0.4%	1 Jul 2026	National annual projection	
Yemen	32,684,503	0.4%	1 Jul 2023	Official estimate	
Madagascar	32,658,977	0.4%	1 Jul 2026	National annual projection	
Ukraine	32,423,000	0.4%	1 Oct 2026	State migration service	(Note: Excludes the Autonomous Republic of Crimea and the city of Sevastopol, Ukraine's de jure territory which is occupied by Russia (however, includes the Donbas region, partly occupied by Russia).)
Nepal	30,034,040	0.4%	1 Jul 2026	National annual projection	
Cameroon	29,442,327	0.4%	1 Jul 2025	National annual projection	
Venezuela	28,633,711	0.3%	1 Jul 2026	UN projection	
Australia	27,921,150	0.3%	31 Mar 2026	Official projection	(Note: Excludes the external territories of Christmas Island, the Cocos (Keeling) Islands, and Norfolk Island.)
Niger	27,522,750	0.3%	1 Jul 2025	National annual projection	
Syria	26,472,497	0.3%	1 Jul 2026	Monthly estimate	
North Korea	25,950,000	0.3%	1 Jul 2024	National annual projection	
Burkina Faso	24,736,828	0.3%	1 Jul 2026	Official projection	
Mali	23,929,000	0.3%	1 Jul 2024	Official projection	
Taiwan	23,204,000	0.3%	31 Oct 2026	Official estimate	(Note: Taiwan includes Penghu, Kinmen, Matsu and other minor islands.)
Zambia	23,003,214	0.3%	1 Jul 2026	Official estimate	
Sri Lanka	21,778,000	0.3%	1 Jul 2026	Official estimate	
Malawi	21,201,635	0.3%	1 Jul 2026	National annual projection	
Kazakhstan	20,633,529	0.2%	1 Oct 2026	Official estimate	
Somalia	20,305,907	0.2%	1 Jul 2026	UN projection	(Note: Includes Somaliland.)
Chile	20,150,948	0.2%	30 Jun 2026	National annual projection	
Chad	20,031,602	0.2%	1 Jul 2026	National annual projection	
Senegal	19,575,061	0.2%	1 Jul 2026	National annual projection	
Romania	19,041,322	0.2%	1 Jan 2026	Official estimate	
Guatemala	18,312,373	0.2%	1 Jul 2026	National annual projection	
Ecuador	18,243,816	0.2%	1 Jul 2026	National annual projection	
Netherlands	18,192,693	0.2%	30 Sep 2026	Official estimate	(Note: Excludes the three constituent countries of the Kingdom of the Netherlands in the Caribbean Sea (Aruba, Curaçao, and Sint Maarten), but includes the three special municipalities of the Caribbean Netherlands (Bonaire, Sint Eustatius and Saba).)
Cambodia	17,816,143	0.2%	1 Jul 2026	Official projection	
Guinea	17,521,167	0.2%	1 Jul 2025	Census July 2025	
Zimbabwe	16,175,966	0.2%	1 Jul 2026	Official projection	
South Sudan	15,786,898	0.2%	1 Jul 2025	National annual projection	
Rwanda	14,418,145	0.2%	1 Jul 2026	National annual projection	
Benin	13,551,992	0.2%	1 Jul 2026	National annual projection	
Burundi	12,332,788	0.1%	16 Aug 2024	Preliminary census result	
United Arab Emirates	12,063,953	0.1%	31 Dec 2025	Official estimate	
Tunisia	11,992,843	0.1%	1 Jan 2026	National estimate	
Belgium	11,947,050	0.1%	1 Sep 2026	Official estimate	
Jordan	11,937,000	0.1%	31 Dec 2025	National estimate	
Haiti	11,867,032	0.1%	1 Jul 2024	National annual projection	
Portugal	11,424,031	0.1%	31 Dec 2025	Official estimate	
Bolivia	11,365,333	0.1%	23 Mar 2024	2024 census result	
Czech Republic	10,903,655	0.1%	30 Jun 2026	Official estimate	
Dominican Republic	10,771,504	0.1%	10 Nov 2022	2022 census result	
Tajikistan	10,721,000	0.1%	1 Jan 2026	Official estimate	
Sweden	10,621,725	0.1%	30 Sep 2026	Monthly national estimate	
Greece	10,372,335	0.1%	1 Jan 2025	Official estimate	
Israel	10,296,300	0.1%	30 Sep 2026	Monthly national estimate	(Note: Includes East Jerusalem and the Golan Heights. Also includes Israeli settlers within Area C of the West Bank.)
Azerbaijan	10,273,450	0.1%	1 Jul 2026	Monthly national estimate	
Honduras	10,186,738	0.1%	1 Jul 2026	National annual projection	
Papua New Guinea	10,185,363	0.1%	16 Jun 2024	2024 census result	
Hungary	9,488,428	0.1%	1 Jan 2026	Official estimate	
Cuba	9,434,593	0.1%	31 Dec 2025	Official estimate	
Sierra Leone	9,270,700	0.1%	1 Jul 2026	National annual projection	
Austria	9,228,795	0.1%	1 Oct 2026	National quarterly estimate	
Switzerland	9,154,896	0.1%	30 Jun 2026	National quarterly estimate	
Belarus	9,056,080	0.1%	1 Jan 2026	Official estimate	
Togo	8,095,498	0.10%	8 Nov 2022	2022 census result	
Laos	7,745,000	0.09%	1 Jul 2025	National annual projection	
Libya	7,539,852	0.09%	1 Jul 2026	UN projection	
Hong Kong (China)	7,518,300	0.09%	30 Jun 2026	National estimate	
Kyrgyzstan	7,404,300	0.09%	1 Jan 2026	Monthly national estimate	
Turkmenistan	7,057,841	0.09%	17 Dec 2022	2022 census result	
Nicaragua	6,874,748	0.08%	30 Jun 2024	Official estimate	
Serbia	6,532,019	0.08%	1 Jan 2026	Official estimate	(Note: Excludes Kosovo.)
Central African Republic	6,470,307	0.08%	1 Jul 2024	National annual projection	
Bulgaria	6,423,207	0.08%	31 Dec 2025	Official estimate	
Singapore	6,208,500	0.07%	30 Jun 2026	National annual projection	
Republic of the Congo	6,142,180	0.07%	17 May 2023	2023 census result	
Paraguay	6,109,644	0.07%	9 Nov 2022	2022 census result	
Denmark	6,044,001	0.07%	1 Oct 2026	Monthly national estimate	(Note: Excludes the Faroe Islands and Greenland.)
El Salvador	6,029,976	0.07%	2 May 2024	2024 census result	
Lebanon	5,895,466	0.07%	2026	Official estimate	
Finland	5,662,086	0.07%	30 Sep 2026	Monthly national estimate	(Note: Includes Åland.)
Norway	5,646,598	0.07%	30 Oct 2026	National quarterly estimate	(Note: Includes Svalbard.)
Palestine	5,557,096	0.07%	31 Dec 2025	National annual projection	(Note: Excludes East Jerusalem or Israeli settlements in the West Bank.)
Ireland	5,525,600	0.07%	1 Apr 2026	National estimate	
Oman	5,454,352	0.07%	30 Sep 2026	Monthly national estimate	
Slovakia	5,403,009	0.07%	30 Jun 2026	National quarterly estimate	
New Zealand	5,372,400	0.06%	30 Sep	National quarterly estimate	(Note: Excludes the two self-governing associated states of the Cook Islands and Niue, and the dependent territory of Tokelau.)
Liberia	5,248,621	0.06%	10 Nov 2022	2022 census result	
Costa Rica	5,217,296	0.06%	30 Jun 2026	National annual projection	
Mauritania	4,927,532	0.06%	25 Dec 2023	2023 census result	
Kuwait	4,881,254	0.06%	1 Jan 2025	Official estimate	
Panama	4,064,780	0.05%	1 Jul 2026	2023 census result	
Georgia	3,941,100	0.05%	1 Jan 2026	Official estimate	(Note: Excludes Abkhazia (242,862, census 2011) and South Ossetia (53,559, census 2015).)
Croatia	3,874,993	0.05%	1 Jul 2025	Official estimate	
Eritrea	3,682,669	0.04%	1 Jul 2026	UN projection (see note)	(Note: Eritrea has never conducted an official government census. Sources disagree about the current population: The UN gives an estimate of 3,502,000 for 2024.; The Eritrea Ministry Of Information gives an estimate of 5.8 million for 2020.; The BBC gives an estimate of 6.2 million for 2023.; The US Census Bureau gives an estimate of 6.4 million for 2025.; Encyclopedia Britannica gives an estimate of 6,416,000 for 2025.; All figures are mid-year.)
Mongolia	3,591,120	0.04%	31 Dec 2025	National annual projection	
Uruguay	3,480,601	0.04%	30 Jun 2026	National annual projection	
Bosnia and Herzegovina	3,412,000	0.04%	1 Jul 2024	Official estimate	
Qatar	3,370,611	0.04%	31 Mar 2026	Monthly national estimate	
Puerto Rico (US)	3,184,835	0.04%	1 Jul 2025	Annual projection	
Armenia	3,103,900	0.04%	1 Jan 2026	Official estimate	
Namibia	3,022,401	0.04%	24 Sep 2023	2023 Census	
Lithuania	2,890,874	0.03%	1 Nov 2026	Monthly national estimate	
Jamaica	2,774,538	0.03%	12 Sep 2022	2022 census result	
Botswana	2,515,633	0.03%	1 Jul 2026	Official estimate	
Gabon	2,469,296	0.03%	1 Jul 2025	National annual projection	
Gambia	2,422,712	0.03%	1 May 2024	Preliminary census results	
Moldova	2,365,600	0.03%	1 Jan 2026	Official estimate	(Note: Excludes Transnistria.)
Albania	2,335,930	0.03%	1 Jan 2026	Official estimate	
Slovenia	2,138,751	0.03%	1 Jul 2026	National quarterly estimate	
Lesotho	2,116,427	0.03%	2024	Official survey	
Guinea-Bissau	1,890,252	0.02%	1 Jul 2026	National annual projection	
Latvia	1,828,600	0.02%	1 Oct 2026	Monthly national estimate	
North Macedonia	1,819,074	0.02%	31 Dec 2025	Official estimate	
Equatorial Guinea	1,727,151	0.02%	1 Jul 2025	Official estimate	
Bahrain	1,603,260	0.02%	30 Jun 2025	Official estimate	
Kosovo	1,582,322	0.02%	31 Dec 2025	2024 national census	
Timor-Leste	1,409,452	0.02%	1 Jul 2026	National annual projection	
Trinidad and Tobago	1,367,764	0.02%	30 Jun 2025	Official estimate	
Estonia	1,360,745	0.02%	1 Jan 2026	Official estimate	
Mauritius	1,240,316	0.01%	30 Jun 2026	National estimate	
Eswatini	1,235,549	0.01%	1 Jul 2024	Official projection	
Djibouti	1,066,809	0.01%	20 May 2024	2024 census result	
Cyprus	996,600	0.01%	31 Dec 2025	Official estimate	(Note: Excludes Northern Cyprus.)
Guyana	956,044	0.01%	31 Dec 2024	Official estimate	
Comoros	944,388	0.01%	2026	Official estimate	
Fiji	902,623	0.01%	1 Jan 2026	National annual projection	
Bhutan	790,718	0.010%	2026	National annual projection	
Solomon Islands	750,325	0.009%	1 Jul 2024	National annual projection	
Luxembourg	690,959	0.008%	1 Jan 2026	Official estimate	
Macau (China)	686,500	0.008%	30 Jun 2026	National quarterly estimate	
Montenegro	622,902	0.008%	1 Jan 2026	Official estimate	
Suriname	616,500	0.007%	1 Jul 2021	Official estimate	
Western Sahara (disputed)	610,813	0.007%	1 Jul 2026	UN projection	
Malta	588,254	0.007%	31 Dec 2025	Official estimate	
Maldives	515,132	0.006%	13 Sep 2022	2022 census result	
Cape Verde	491,233	0.006%	16 Jun 2021	2021 census result	
Northern Cyprus	476,214	0.006%	31 Dec 2023	Official projection	(Note: De facto independent, de jure part of Cyprus.)
Brunei	458,600	0.006%	1 Jul 2025	Official estimate	
Belize	418,982	0.005%	1 Jul 2026	Official estimate	
Bahamas	398,165	0.005%	4 Apr 2022	2022 census result	
Iceland	397,710	0.005%	30 Sep 2026	National quarterly estimate	
Transnistria	367,776	0.004%	31 Mar 2024	Official estimate	(Note: De facto independent, de jure part of Moldova.)
Vanuatu	321,409	0.004%	1 Jul 2024	National annual projection	
French Polynesia (France)	279,500	0.003%	31 Dec 2025	National annual projection	
New Caledonia (France)	264,596	0.003%	1 Jan 2025	National annual projection	
Barbados	261,692	0.003%	31 Dec 2025	Official estimate	
Abkhazia	244,236	0.003%	1 Jan 2022	Official estimate	(Note: The political status of Abkhazia is disputed. Having unilaterally declared independence from Georgia in 1992, Abkhazia is formally recognised as an independent state by 4 UN member states (three other states previously recognised it but then withdrew their recognition), while the remainder of the international community recognizes it as de jure Georgian territory. Georgia continues to claim the area as its own territory, designating it as Russian-occupied territory.)
São Tomé and Príncipe	209,607	0.003%	2024	Preliminary census result	
Samoa	205,557	0.002%	6 Nov 2021	2021 Census	
Saint Lucia	184,100	0.002%	1 Jul 2023	Official estimate	
Curaçao (Netherlands)	158,006	0.002%	1 Jan 2026	Official estimate	
Guam (US)	153,836	0.002%	1 Apr 2020	2020 census result	
Seychelles	123,565	0.001%	30 Jun 2026	Official estimate	
Kiribati	120,740	0.001%	1 Jul 2021	National annual projection	
Aruba (Netherlands)	110,625	0.001%	31 Dec 2025	Official estimate	
Saint Vincent and the Grenadines	109,296	0.001%	15 Jun 2023	2023 census result	
Grenada	109,021	0.001%	2021	Preliminary Census results	
Antigua and Barbuda	106,365	0.001%	1 Jan 2026	Official estimate	
Jersey (UK)	104,540	0.001%	31 Dec 2024	2021 census result	
Tonga	100,179	0.001%	30 Nov 2021	2021 census result	
Cayman Islands (UK)	90,577	0.001%	31 Dec 2025	National annual projection	
Andorra	90,271	0.001%	31 Oct 2026	Monthly national estimate	
U.S. Virgin Islands (US)	87,146	0.001%	1 Apr 2020	2020 census result	
Isle of Man (UK)	84,975	0.001%	1 Apr 2025	Official estimate	
Micronesia	75,817	0.0009%	12 Feb 2023	2023 Census	
Dominica	65,400	0.0008%	2026	Official estimate	
Guernsey (UK)	64,781	0.0008%	31 Dec 2023	National quarterly estimate	
Bermuda (UK)	64,055	0.0008%	1 Jul 2021	National annual projection	
Greenland (Denmark)	56,945	0.0007%	1 Jul 2026	National quarterly estimate	
South Ossetia	56,520	0.0007%	31 Dec 2021	Official estimate	(Note: South Ossetia's status is disputed. It considers itself to be an independent state, but this is recognised by only a few other countries. The Georgian government and most of the world's other states consider South Ossetia de jure a part of Georgia's territory.)
Faroe Islands (Denmark)	55,616	0.0007%	1 Oct 2026	Monthly national estimate	
Turks and Caicos Islands (UK)	52,299	0.0006%	1 Jul 2025	Official estimate	
Saint Kitts and Nevis	51,320	0.0006%	2022	2022 census result	
American Samoa (US)	49,710	0.0006%	1 Apr 2020	2020 census result	
Northern Mariana Islands (US)	47,329	0.0006%	1 Apr 2020	2020 census result	
Sint Maarten (Netherlands)	42,449	0.0005%	31 Dec 2025	Official estimate	
Marshall Islands	42,418	0.0005%	30 Sep 2021	2021 Census	
Liechtenstein	41,228	0.0005%	31 Dec 2025	National estimate	
British Virgin Islands (UK)	39,471	0.0005%	1 Jul 2024	UN projection	
Monaco	38,857	0.0005%	31 Dec 2025	Census	
Gibraltar (UK)	38,196	0.0005%	14 Nov 2022	Preliminary census results	
San Marino	34,151	0.0004%	30 Sep 2026	Monthly national estimate	
Saint Martin (France)	31,496	0.0004%	1 Jan 2025	Official estimate	
Palau	16,733	0.0002%	1 Jul 2021	2021 Census	
Anguilla (UK)	16,010	0.0002%	31 Dec 2024	Official estimate	
Cook Islands	15,040	0.0002%	1 Jul 2021	2021 Census	
Nauru	11,680	0.0001%	30 Oct 2021	2021 Census	
Wallis and Futuna (France)	11,620	0.0001%	24 Jul 2023	2023 Census	
Tuvalu	10,643	0.0001%	12 Dec 2022	2022 Census	
Saint Barthélemy (France)	10,562	0.0001%	1 Jan 2025	Official estimate	
Saint Pierre and Miquelon (France)	5,819	0%	1 Jan 2025	Official estimate	
Saint Helena, Ascension and Tristan da Cunha (UK)	5,651	0%	1 Jul 2021	2021 Census	
Montserrat (UK)	4,386	0%	23 Sep 2023	2023 census result	
Falkland Islands (UK)	3,662	0%	10 Oct 2021	2021 census result	
Tokelau (New Zealand)	2,608	0%	1 Jan 2025	2025 Census	
Norfolk Island (Australia)	2,188	0%	1 Jan 2021	2021 Census	
Christmas Island (Australia)	1,692	0%	1 Jan 2021	2021 Census	
Niue	1,681	0%	11 Nov 2022	2022 Census	
Vatican City	882	0%	31 Dec 2024	Official figure	(Note: 882 residents regardless of citizenship, 618 citizens regardless of residence, 246 resident citizens.)
Cocos (Keeling) Islands (Australia)	593	0%	30 Jun 2020	2021 Census	
Pitcairn Islands (UK)	35	0%	2023	Official estimate	

== See also ==
- List of countries by population (United Nations)
- Demographics of the world
- List of countries and dependencies by area
- List of countries and dependencies by population density
- List of countries by population growth rate
- List of countries by number of births
