= No. 356 Squadron RAF =

Defunct flying squadron of the Royal Air Force

- Active: 15 January 1944 – 15 November 1945
- Country: United Kingdom
- Branch: Royal Air Force
- Role: long-range bomber
- Part of: No. 231 Group RAF, South East Asia Command
- Mottos: We bring freedom and assistance

Insignia
- Squadron Badge heraldry: A demi-tiger erased

Aircraft flown
- Bomber: Consolidated Liberator

No. 356 Squadron RAF was a short-lived long-range bomber squadron of the Royal Air Force between 1944 and 1945.

== History ==
The squadron was formed on 15 January 1944 at Salbani, Bengal, British India, as a long-range bomber unit equipped with the Consolidated Liberator.

No.356 Squadron included many personnel from the Royal Canadian Air Force (RCAF) and Canadians serving in the RAF. The main reason for this was that the main Liberator conversion unit, under the British Commonwealth Air Training Plan, was in Canada, at RCAF Boundary Bay, in British Columbia.

Wing Commander Hugo Beall DSO, a Canadian serving in the RAF, was the first CO of 356 Squadron, when it started operations in 1943. Under Beall's leadership in the early raids this squadron developed techniques for low-level bombing of the dispersed and relatively small targets in Burma and Thailand. The squadron was later led by another Canadian, RCAF Wing Commander G. N. B. (Bryan) Sparks, DSO, who commanded it until 11 August 1945.

The squadron's first operations were meteorological flights, for training purposes, in June 1944. Its first bombing mission was on 27 July 1944. From then the squadron attacked Japanese bases in South East Asia and planted mines outside enemy harbours. On 15 June 1945 the squadron together with 159 Squadron destroyed the 10,000 ton Japanese tanker, Tohu Maru in the Gulf of Siam of Koh Samui Island.

In July 1945 the squadron moved to the Cocos Islands to prepare for the invasion of Malaya.

On 23 August 1945, one of its aircraft, Serial Number KL654 flown by Flight Lieutenant John Watts, crashed at Kuala Pilah, Negeri Sembilan, Malaya after parachuting Claude Fenner, later Inspector General of Malaysian Police into Malaya. The wreck was discovered in the 1950s and again in 1996 by local tribes-people. The bodies of the crew were retrieved and buried in Cheras War Cemetery, Kuala Lumpur in 2012.

The end of the war came before the invasion was carried out and the squadron performed supply-dropping and transport duties until it was disbanded on 15 November 1945.

== Aircraft operated ==
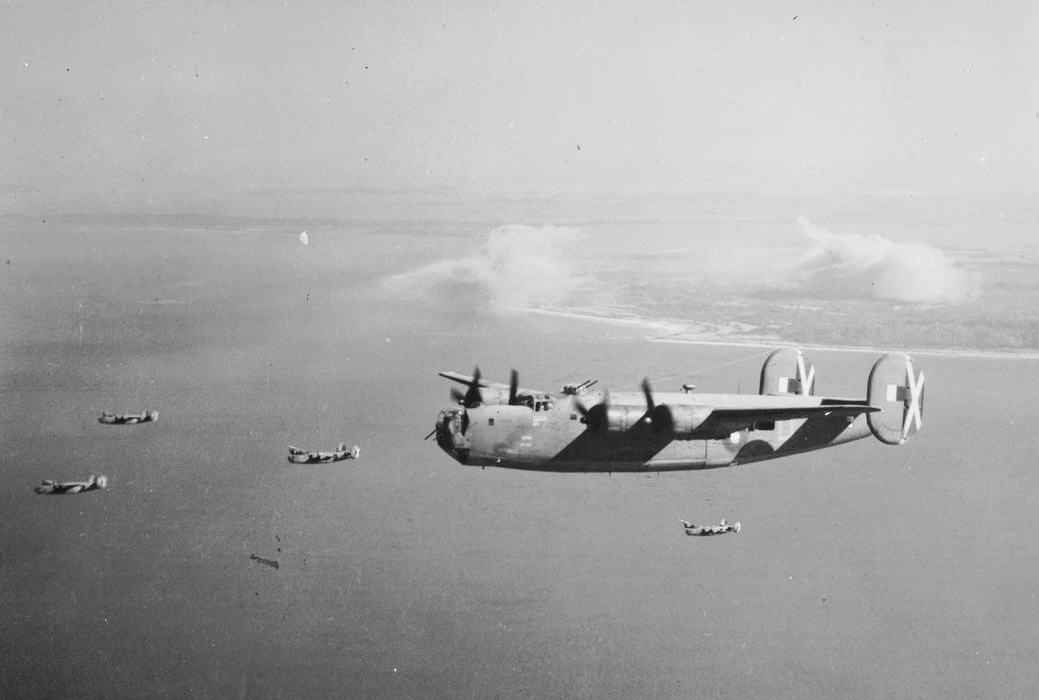
356 Sqn. Liberators after bombing Ramree Island, in 1945.

Aircraft operated by No. 356 Squadron RAF, data from
From	To	Aircraft	Version
January 1944	November 1945	Consolidated Liberator	Mk.VI

== Squadron bases ==
Bases and airfields used by No. 356 Squadron RAF, data from
From	To	Base	Remark
15 January 1944	22 July 1945	RAF Salbani, Bengal, British India	
22 July 1945	15 November 1945	Cocos Islands, Straits Settlements	

== See also ==
- List of Royal Air Force aircraft squadrons
- Tiger Force (air)
