= Salleh System =

Malaysian concept

The Salleh System (Malay: Sistem Salleh) is a concept presented by Mohamed Salleh bin Ismael, the Malaysian Inspector General of Police to increase the effectiveness of action to eradicate crime by involving the public directly. The system to prevent crime before it is not effective, and it appears when observing the increase in crime in the mid-1960s considerable concern.

Prior to the usage of this system, crime prevention was not effective owing to the increase in crimes during the 1960s.

== History ==
In September 1967, the Police Planning and Research Branch has developed and compiled a new concept called Salleh System, which as taken in conjunction with the name of the IGP Tun Salleh Ismail. To test the effectiveness of this system, it has tried to be implemented in Petaling Jaya in February 1968. This experiment appears to effectively and successfully reduce crime rate in Petaling Jaya. Instructions issued on 7 June 1968 by Police Force Order so that the system is implemented in all Contingents.

== Roles ==
The main purpose of this program is to train police officers to be more responsible and acceptable by the public as a companion. Thus the system is expected to change the pattern of police officers to realise that their services are needed and they are a law enforcement officer.

Instruction is also explained in detail goals, namely:

- foster feelings of the public through stacked with those who carry out beat to win the trust;
- provide immediate assistance to the public with the call ready to help and receive the complaint;
- easy to work with adding and improving the flow of information:
- provide an interesting system to protect or reduce the crime rate.
- inculcate the spirit of police officers in relation to their duties in a manner that integrate the knowledge available;

== Functions ==
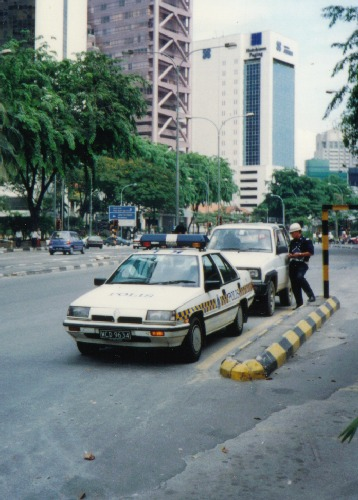
The Proton Saga patrol vehicles during a patrol duties.

This system carried out by:

- Each area is divided into patrol police station, sector, ward and zone boundary line where it is clear that the area, competitive factors, size and so on. A beat or more, or a patrol or more or a beat and a patrol may be a sector. Two or more sectors into a single ward. Two more became a ward or zone.
- The officers, members and the Junior Ranks constables are given responsibility for specific areas to enable them to understand their respective areas and are responsible for any incidents that occur as a result of police negligence.
- Each zone under the supervision of officers and members of the Lower Ranks care ward. Zone officer is responsible to the Head of District Police.
- Rank and file members and Constables elected to control and beat duties; patrol and sectors will be located at least 12 months to allow them to learn the ins-and outs of people-people.
- The officers, members and the Junior Ranks constables assigned to study, meet and communicate with the friendly people of their areas to create public confidence in them. They also strive to collect any information about their respective areas.
- If possible, officers, members and the Junior Ranks constables will be living in their area and moving in their area.
- With full knowledge of all residents in their respective areas, any incidents will be easily detected.
- With that knowledge will create confidence and security of members of police to carry out their duties.
- Experience and knowledge gained by members of the police in the area they will improve efficiency and create a sense of responsibility among members.

== Task ==
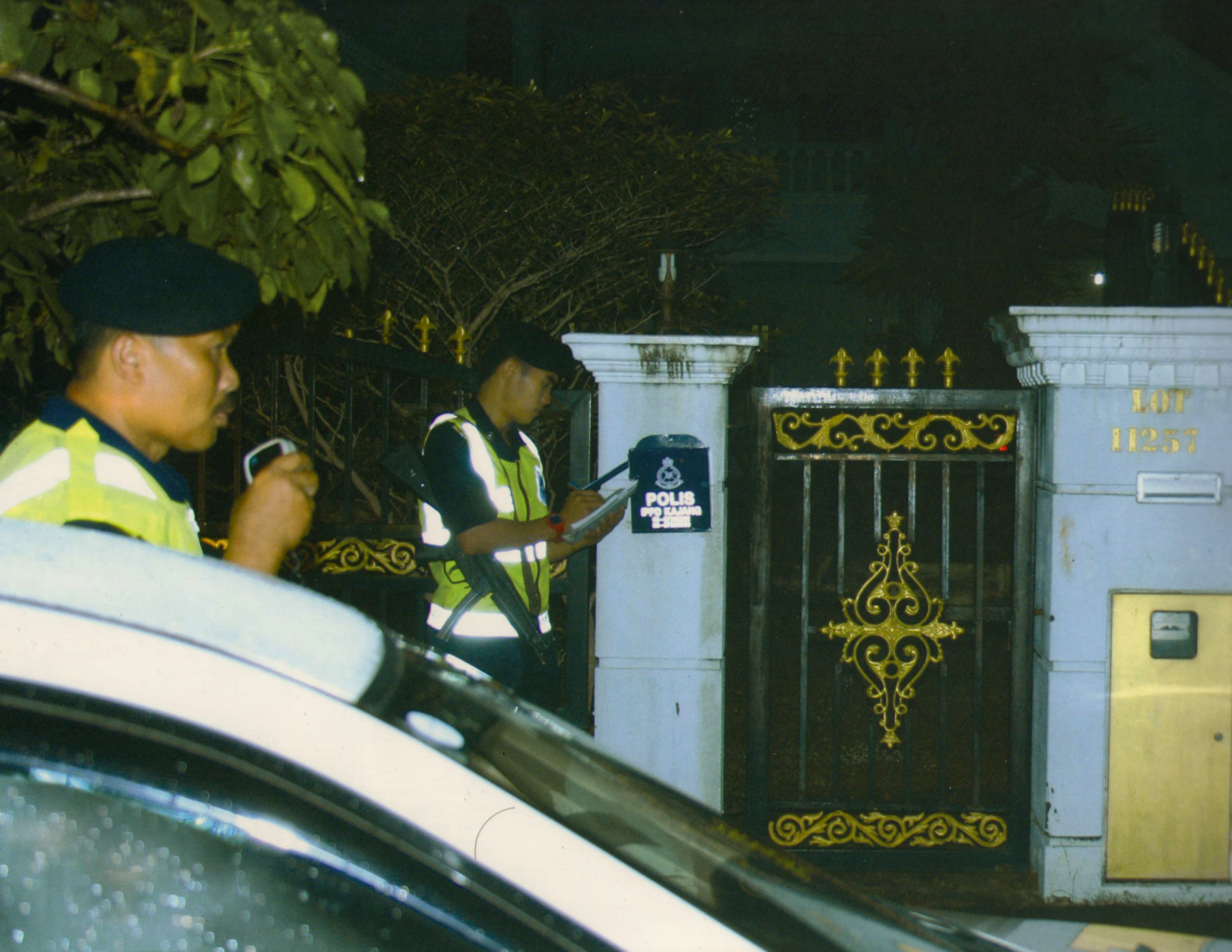
The Salleh System also used to Prevented Crimes Patrol for all patrol duties.

To create and implement the system completely, which is before the targeted areas beat, patrol, and the ward has made a careful study of the various terms of the position, size, population and the breakdown of race, crime, secret societies, maps, the sensitivity of the area history (complaints / hostilities between the parties), political situation and the activities of subversive.

Salleh System operational is streamlined with the regular beat patrols (including walking, cycling or motorcycling) and patrol cars (Mobile Patrol Vehicles). Members of a patrol is provided with Walkie-talkie to enable them to contact or to be able to move and act swiftly when place of a mishap. The Salleh system beat the established police beat posts in the city or in the villages throughout the country. Police posts was set up in areas identified as needs in the areas frequented by people, housing and selected villages. The presence of police will establish public confidence in police. The relationship between the two parties will promote mutual understanding to their own problems. That way the co-operation and support to the police, especially in crime prevention efforts can be improved from time to time.

These huts are usually led by a police member of the rank of corporals and two constables. To ensure the smooth running of this system, the information created and mobilised in each station. This room is completed with a variety of information to facilitate police patrol and beat duty, including:area maprecords of the offence, nature of the offence, modus operandi of crime, personal details of the suspect, who always places the crimes occurred, and so on.other information deemed necessary.
