= Telephone numbers in the Cocos (Keeling) Islands =

Telephone numbers in the Cocos Islands use ranges owned by Australia. The country code is +61, the area code is 08, and the first digits of the local numbers are either 41, 51, or 91.

Country Code: +61 8 9162 (partial)
International Call Prefix: 0011
Trunk Prefix: 0

Format +61 8 9162 XXXX

| Number range | Usage |
|---|---|
| +61 8 9162 | Cocos Islands |

Cocos Island numbers formerly used the +672 country code until 1994, when they were migrated to +61.

| Date | Number | Country code |
|---|---|---|
| pre-1994 | (02) 2345 | +672 |
| 1994-1997 | (091) 62 2345 | +61 |
| 1997-now | (08) 9162 2345 | +61 |
