= Islam in the Cocos (Keeling) Islands =

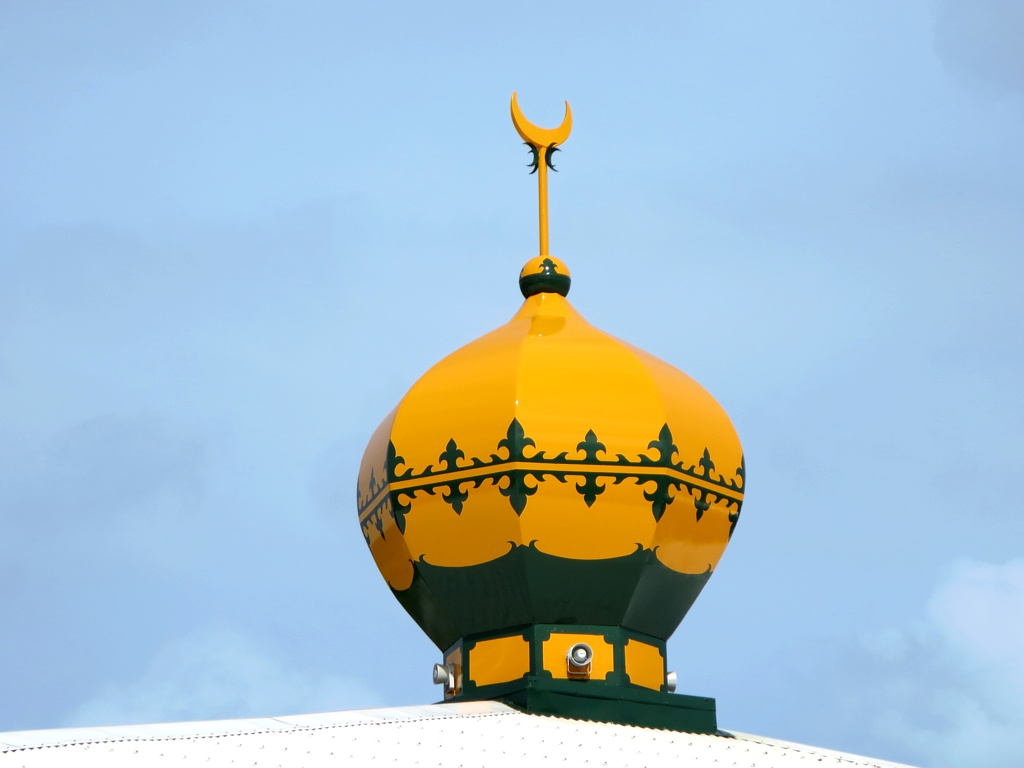
The bright yellow minaret atop the mosque on Home Island, Cocos (Keeling) Islands.

Islam in the Cocos (Keeling) Islands is the majority religion. As of the 2021 census, 65% of the population were Muslim.

The large Muslim population is due to the migration of labourers who were brought to Cocos (Keeling) Islands and to Christmas Island of ethnic Malay and Indonesian origin. The population on the two inhabited Cocos (Keeling) Islands generally is split between the ethnic Europeans on West Island (est. pop. 120) and the ethnic Malays on Home Island (est. pop. 500).

The Island's main Muslim organisation is the Islamic Council of Cocos Keeling Islands.

== Mosque ==
There are three mosques on the islands, the most recent of which is the Commonwealth Heritage-listed West Island Mosque. The Home Island Mosque is one of the most vibrant places on the island, with its minaret painted in the colours of the territorial flag: green and gold.

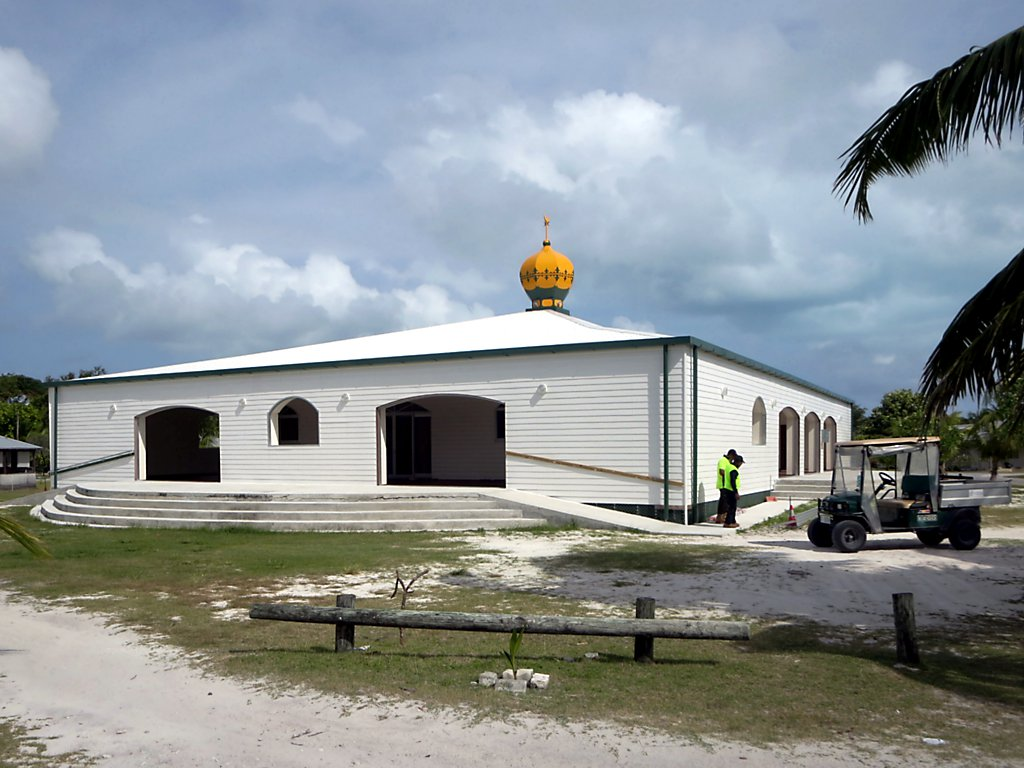
Home Island Mosque

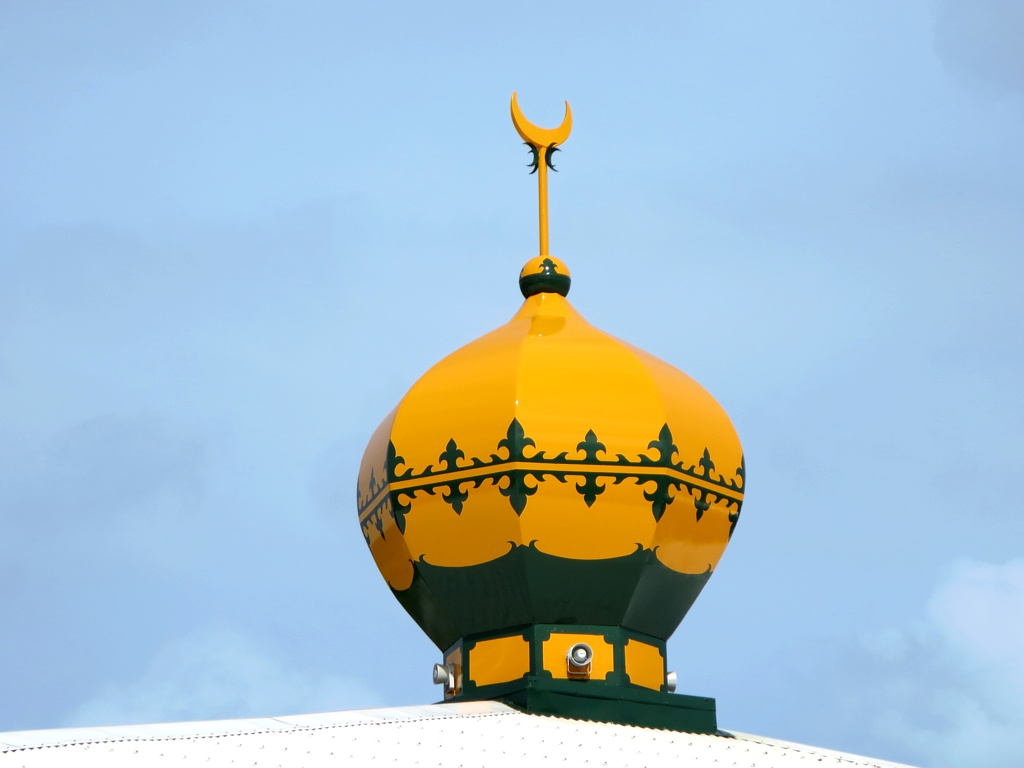
Home Island Yellow dome of the mosque

== See also ==
- Islam in Australia
- Islam in Christmas Island
- Religion in the Cocos (Keeling) Islands
