= National Police Cadet (Malaysia) =

Uniformed group in Malaysia

National Police Cadet Pasukan Kadet Polis
- Motto: Tegas, Adil dan Berhemah (Strict, Fair and Prudent)

Agency overview
- Formed: 2 March 1970
- Volunteers: 115,075 (2015)

Jurisdictional structure
- Governing body: Malaysia

Operational structure
- Parent agency: Ministry of Home Affairs; Ministry of Education

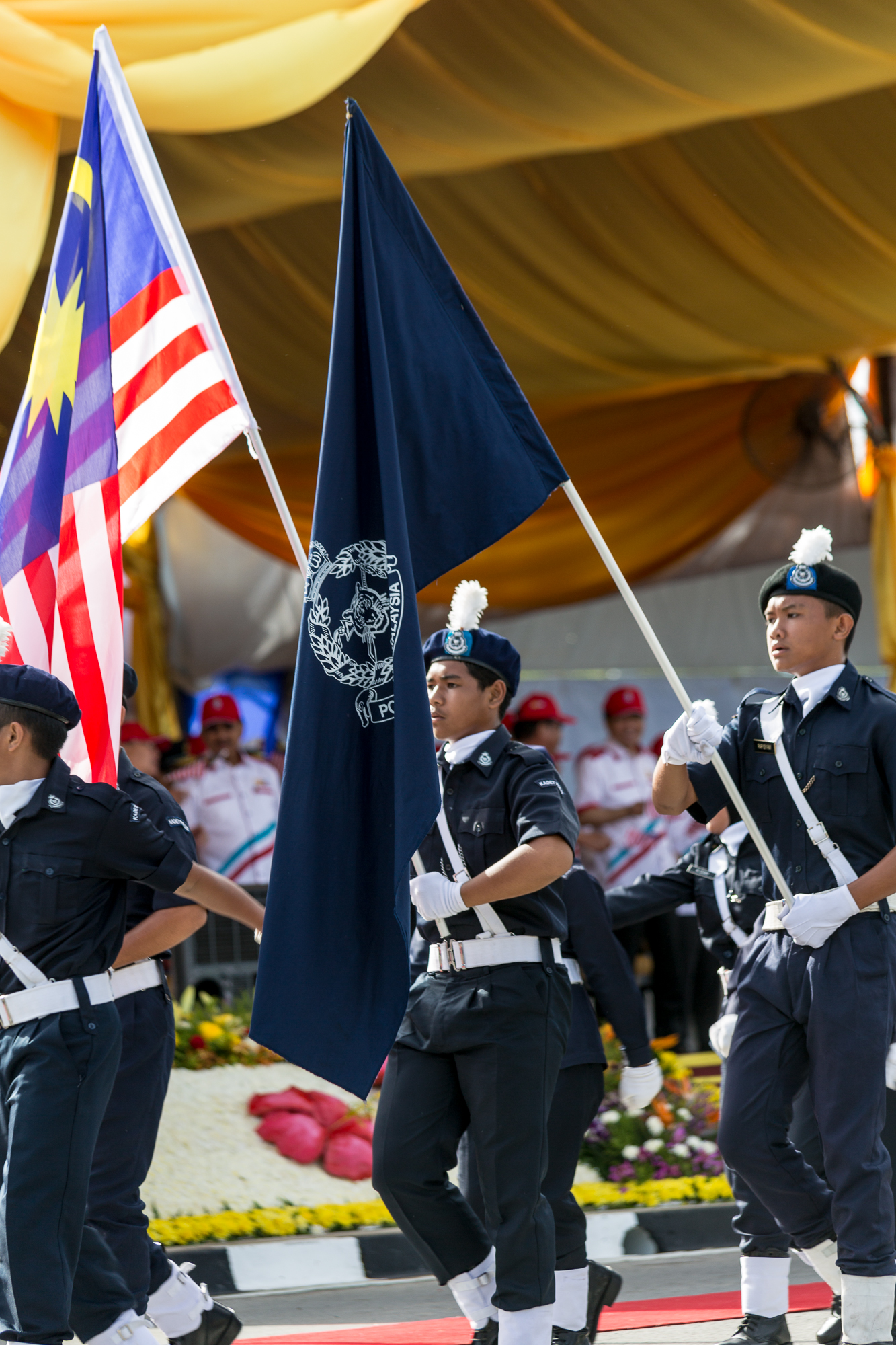
Police Cadet corps members

The National Police Cadet of Royal Malaysian Police (often abbreviated in Malay as PKP) is a uniformed body at selected high schools and colleges in Malaysia with the aim of inculcating discipline among students and helping to curb negative activities. They are available for those who are 14 years old and up to 21 years old.

The purpose of establishing the Police Cadet is to give exposure to a number of students in aspects of the role and function of policing in dealing with the problem of moral crime, drugs, and gangsterism among students who will become leaders in the future.

The National Police Cadet are often associated with the Crime Prevention And Community Safety Department, and are under the Support Resource Coordination Division of the Royal Malaysian Police.

== History ==
The idea to form a Police Cadet corps was triggered by the former Inspector-General of Police, late Tun Mohamed Salleh Ismail when launching the Police Cadet Team on 2 March 1970. He said,

The overall objective is to make the cadet a responsible citizen of the future. He must yield a strong and healthy influence among his colleagues, friends and family so that in the years ahead, there will be a new breed, of enlightened good citizens contributing to nation-building.

== Organisation ==
Police Cadet platoon (one platoon per school) members are made out of Trainee/Junior Cadets, Senior Cadets, Cadet Corporal and a Cadet Sergeant. Cadet team members and trainee cadets are picked from high school students who have passed basic interviews and physical tests. Senior Cadets are made up of those who have passed interviews at PDRM (Royal Malaysian Police HQ) and one teacher in their respective high school would be selected to become a Cadet Inspector, tasked with being the platoon advisor. A Police Cadet platoon normally comprises 35 members including three corporals, a sergeant and a senior cadet officer leading a team of 30 cadets.

=== Purposes of establishment ===
- Role Of Youth In "Nation Building"
- As part of Co-curricular activity diversification

The police corps are proven effective as records show many cadets went on to join the police force to become full-time sworn officers, whether upon completion of tertiary education or graduating from Police Undergraduate Voluntary Corps. Most had shown a high level of discipline and stayed away from social ills such as drug abuse and truancy, aligned with the objective of the cadet corps' establishment.

=== Ranks ===
Cadet

- Cadet Officers (analogous to Police Constable)
- Lance Corporal
- Corporal
- Sergeant
- Staff Sergeant

Instructors

- Sergeant Major
- Inspector
- Chief Inspector
- Assistant Superintendent of Police
- Deputy Superintendent of Police

== Training and membership ==
Open to students in high schools where Police Cadet platoons have been formed
Membership is open only to those who are healthy and capable of weekend marches and running exercises.
Selected members would be supplied with a specialised Police Cadet uniform that complies with a specific design.
Police Cadet members are usually allowed (e.g. Sekolah Aminuddin Baki, KL) to wear their PDRM name tags, black leather shoes and PDRM web belts as part of their school uniforms.

Among other topics, Police Cadets also conduct basic training and responsibilities that vary respectively. Some of the trainings is conducted at National Service Training Center or local police stations. This includes:

- Police Marching -- With an annual marching competition at the state level.
- Service -- Carrying out pure soul movements, community watch, supporting community/school projects or events. Assists law enforcement in community policing, traffic control and local activities.
- Lectures and Trainings -- History, law, police roles and responsibility, police structure, crime prevention, first aid and firearms.
- Camping -- Annual camping supported by PDRM's Polis Hutan or GOF elements. Platoon-sized tents are provided, with rations.
- Shooting -- Annual shooting competition at PULAPOL. Commonly used firearms include the Colt M16, Smith & Wesson .38 Special, Browning Hi-Power, Walther PPK, Heckler & Koch MP5 and others.
