= Mohamed Salleh Ismael =

Yang Amat Berbahagia Tun Dato' Seri Mohamed Salleh Ismael SSM PMN SPMP DIMP JMN PJK QPM
- محمد صالح إسماعيل

2nd Inspector-General of Police (Malaysia)
- In office 29 March 1966 – 31 January 1973
- Monarchs: Ismail Nasiruddin; Abdul Halim
- Prime Minister: Tunku Abdul Rahman; Abdul Razak Hussein
- Minister: Ismail Abdul Rahman; Abdul Razak Hussein
- Preceded by: Claude Fenner
- Succeeded by: Abdul Rahman Hashim

Personal details
- Born: 7 July 1917 Bukit Mertajam, Penang, Straits Settlements, British Malaya (now Malaysia)
- Died: 31 January 1973 (aged 55) Kuala Lumpur, Malaysia
- Resting place: Jalan Ampang Muslim Cemetery, Kuala Lumpur
- Spouse: Toh Puan Sa'odah @ Annie Zedah Abdul Aziz
- Children: 2

Mohamed Salleh bin Ismael (7 July 1917 – 31 January 1973) was the second inspector-general of police of Malaysia, and the first Asian and ethnic Malay to hold the position, taking office on 29 March 1966. His predecessor was Claude Fenner. His work resulted in the "Salleh System", as well as the National Police Cadets and the Police Volunteer Reserve.

Before being promoted to inspector-general, he was also Federal Police Secretary to the Commissioner of Police (from 31 August 1957), Deputy Commissioner of Police (1 April 1961 – 31 March 1962), Director of Police Affairs (1 April 1962 – 12 July 1962), Commissioner of Police, Federation of Malaya (13 July 1962 – 8 February 1966).

== Honours ==
- Malaya
  - Companion of the Order of the Defender of the Realm (JMN) (1958)
- Malaysia
  - Commander of the Order of the Defender of the Realm (PMN) – Tan Sri (1963)
  - Recipient of the Malaysian Commemorative Medal (Gold) (PPM) (1965)
  - Grand Commander of the Order of Loyalty to the Crown of Malaysia (SSM) – Tun (1973)
- Perak
  - Recipient of the Meritorious Service Medal (PJK)
  - Knight Grand Commander of the Order of the Perak State Crown (SPMP) – Dato' Seri (1970)
- Pahang
  - Knight Companion of the Order of the Crown of Pahang (DIMP) – Dato' (1970)

=== Commonwealth Honours ===
- United Kingdom
  - Recipient of the Queen's Police Medal (Q.P.M.) (1957)

=== Foreign honours ===
- South Vietnam
  - Commander of the National Order of Vietnam (1965)
