= Kaum Ibu (Women's Group) =

Women's rights organisation in the Cocos (Keeling) Islands

Kaum Ibu (Women's Group) is a women's rights organisation in the Cocos (Keeling) Islands. In 2001 and 2004 the group was part of consultations on transport and regional services, led by the Government of Australia's Joint Standing Committee on the National Capital and External Territories. The chairperson of the organisation is Danie Olbio.
