= Claude Fenner =

First Inspector-General of Police of Malaysia (1916–1978)

Yang Berbahagia Tan Sri Sir Claude Harry Fenner PMN(K) KBE CMG QPM CPM

1st Inspector-General of Police (Malaysia)
- In office 18 September 1958 – 28 February 1966
- Monarchs: Abdul Rahman; Hisamuddin; Putra; Ismail Nasiruddin
- Prime Minister: Tunku Abdul Rahman
- Preceded by: Himself as Commissioner of Police, Director of Police Affairs (1958 - 1963)
- Succeeded by: Mohamed Salleh Ismael

Personal details
- Born: 16 January 1916 Fulham, London, England
- Died: 15 May 1978 (aged 62) Kenny Hill, Kuala Lumpur, Malaysia
- Spouse: Puan Sri Lady Joan Margaret Fenner of Queensland (m. 1941; died 1978)
- Children: 1
- Education: Highgate School

Sir Claude Harry Fenner (16 January 1916 − 15 May 1978) was the first Inspector-General of Police of Malaysia, serving from 18 September 1958 to 28 February 1966.

== Background ==
Fenner was born on 16 January 1916 in Fulham, United Kingdom and died on 15 May 1978 at Kenny Hill, Kuala Lumpur, Malaysia. He was the son of Harry Fenner and Daisy Elizabeth Arnold. He was educated at Highgate School.

== Police and Military career ==
He joined the Federated Malay States Police Force as a Cadet Assistant Superintendent of Police in 1936. After the Japanese invasion of Malaya he moved to Singapore, leaving two days before it fell to the Japanese in 1942. He eventually made his way from Indonesia to Australia. That year he joined the Nigerian Police Force.

He joined the British Army and was based in India. There he volunteered to fight the Japanese in Malaya as a member of Force 136. Through 1943 he unsuccessfully attempted to land by submarine in Japanese Malaya under Operation Gustavus I. On his final attempt in November 1943 he met Chin Peng who advised him not to come at that time. He was parachuted into Malaya on a RAF 356 Squadron Liberator Snake on 23 August 1945, which then crashed in Kuala Pilah, Negeri Sembilan. By war's end he was a Lieutenant Colonel in charge of a guerrilla unit.

He continued to serve as a Lieutenant-Colonel in the British Military Administration during the disbandment of the Malayan People's Anti-Japanese Army in 1945.

Rejoining the Colonial Police Force, he was awarded the Colonial Police Medal in 1950 and the Queen's Police Medal in 1957. He became Johor Police Chief in 1955. With the granting of independence to Malaysia, he became Commissioner of Police, Director of Police Affairs, and in 1963, became Inspector-General of Police, a position he retained during the Indonesia–Malaysia confrontation. He was seconded to the Prime Minister's Office as Deputy Secretary for Security and Intelligence in 1958. In 1966 he was succeeded as Inspector-General of Police by Mohamed Salleh Ismael.

=== Transition of power and Malayanisation process ===
The police force was also involved in "Malayanisation", the process of replacing British officers serving in the Federation of Malaya Civil Service with locals. The Malayanisation of policing was initiated and implemented by Commissioner of Police W. L. R. Carbonell on 14 April 1953, assisted by Fenner, who at that time the Deputy Commissioner of Police.

=== Police Force Development and Modernization ===
Fenner's leadership era also emphasized welfare, he tried to improve the economy of the police force by making the Police Cooperative which had been created since 24 April 1928 as a cooperative that can carry out its functions more efficiently and effectively while also being able to help its members make loans and encourage them wisely. A new, more complete and perfect building was erected and officially opened on 10 January 1959. Before this, the Police Cooperative carried out its operations by boarding at the Bukit Aman Police Headquarters building.

In the early stages of his tenure as Commissioner of Police of Federation of Malaya in 1958, Fenner opened up the Cadet ASP scheme as an effort to create future senior police officers who are capable and can take over the administration of the force in the future. The scheme continued until 2006, when it was stopped by IGP Musa Hassan. Prospective applicants to the police force can now only apply to Police Constable and Probationary Inspector posts.

== Retirement ==
Fenner remained resident in Malaysia for the remainder of his life. He was special representative of the rubber growers association after his retirement from the Police. He was awarded honours by Malaysia in 1961, CMG in 1963, and KBE in 1965. He married Joan Margaret Fenner in 1941 and they had one daughter.

== Honours ==
- United Kingdom :
  - Recipient of the Colonial Police Medal (CPM) (1950)
  - Recipient of the Queen's Police Medal (QPM) (1957)
  - Companion of the Order of St Michael and St George (CMG) (1963)
  - Knight Commander of the Order of the British Empire (KBE) – Sir (1965)
- Malaya :
  - Honorary Commander of the Order of the Defender of the Realm (PMN (K)) – Tan Sri (1961)
- Malaysia :
  - Recipient of the Malaysian Commemorative Medal (Gold) (PPM) (1965)

=== Foreign honours ===
- South Vietnam :
  - Commander of the National Order of Vietnam (1965)
