= Demographics of the Cocos (Keeling) Islands =

Demographic features of the population of the Cocos (Keeling) Islands include population density, ethnicity, education level, health of the populace, economic status, religious affiliations and other aspects of the population.

== CIA World Factbook demographic statistics ==
The following demographic statistics are from the CIA World Factbook, unless otherwise indicated.

=== Population ===
- 596

=== Nationality ===
- noun: Cocos Islander(s)
- adjective: Cocos Islander

=== Ethnic groups ===
- Europeans
- Cocos Malays

=== Religions ===
Sunni Islam 80% Other 20%

=== Languages ===
- Malay (Cocos dialect)
- English

== 2021 Population census ==
=== Religions ===
Religions of Cocos (keeling) Island as for 2021
1. Sunni Islam (65.6%)
2. Non-religious (14.0%)
3. Catholic (2.00%)
4. Anglican (1.50%)
5. Unspecifie (15.3%)
6. Other (1.60%)

== Other ==
=== Racial and ethnic composition ===
Ethnic people of Cocos (keeling) Island as for 2015
1. Malays (85.0%)
2. Europeans (15.0%)

== See also ==
- Cocos (Keeling) Islands
- Cocos Malays
