= 1984 Cocos (Keeling) Islands status referendum =

Cocos (Keeling) Islands status referendum
- 6 April 1984

Results
| Integration with Australia | 88.42% |
| Free association with Australia | 8.11% |
| Independence | 3.47% |

Originally an uninhabited atoll, the Cocos (Keeling) Islands were brought into the jurisdiction of the British Empire in the mid-19th century following the populating of the islands and the emergence of a plantation economy. In 1955, the islands were transferred to Australian control. Throughout this period, a single family effectively dominated all aspects of local affairs. By the 1960s and 1970s dissatisfaction amongst the local population over living conditions and broader international attention from the United Nations led to changes in Australian policy towards the islands. This culminated in a status referendum held on 6 April 1984, where the resident population was asked to decide between three options: to become independent, to enter into free association with Australia or to integrate into Australia. All registered voters participated in the vote, with 88% choosing integration with Australia. The referendum has been described as the "smallest act of self-determination ever conducted".

== Background ==
Discovered in 1609 by William Keeling and uninhabited until 1826, the Cocos Islands were administered by the United Kingdom between 1857 and 1955, when they were transferred from the Colony of Singapore to Australia, and given the status of an external territory. However, the islands remained effectively under the control of the Clunies-Ross family, who had founded a settlement on the islands in 1827 and held power since 1831, with the head of the family becoming known as the King of the Cocos (Keeling) Islands. In 1886, Queen Victoria had granted the family possession of the islands in perpetuity.

In 1974, a United Nations (UN) mission to the islands drew attention to the territory's governance arrangements and raised concerns about the denial of basic freedoms to its residents. The UN criticised the Australian government for failing to administer the islands properly. As a result, in 1978, the Australian government purchased all lands on the islands except the Clunies-Ross house for $4.75 million (equivalent to $43.66 million in 2022). A second UN visit in 1980 reported positively on the reforms.

Although there was no pressure from the UN to hold a referendum on self-determination due to recognition of the small size of the islands, the Australian government opted to proceed with a referendum.

== Campaign ==
The island voters were given the option of integration with Australia, free association with Australia or independence. The Clunies-Ross family campaigned for the independence option, claiming that the Cocos Islanders would have to serve in the Australian Army if the islands opted for integration.

== Conduct ==
A mission from the UN observed the referendum, led by Abdul Koroma from Sierra Leone and also including representatives from Fiji, Venezuela, and Yugoslavia. Their report stated that the referendum had been "conducted in strict accordance with the pertinent electoral ordinance, resulting in a free and fair vote."

== Results ==
| Choice | Votes | % |
|---|---|---|
| Integration with Australia | 229 | 88.42 |
| Free association with Australia | 21 | 8.11 |
| Independence | 9 | 3.47 |
| Total | 259 | 100.00 |
| Valid votes | 259 | 99.23 |
| Invalid/blank votes | 2 | 0.77 |
| Total votes | 261 | 100.00 |
| Registered voters/turnout | 261 | 100.00 |
Source: United Nations

== Aftermath ==
Following the referendum, the Commonwealth Electoral Act was extended to cover all the islands, allowing Cocos residents to vote in the December 1984 Australian federal elections. The Social Security Act was also extended to cover the residents of the islands. The islands were also removed from the list of United Nations list of non-self-governing territories.
