= Iran–European Union relations =

European Union–Iran relations

- European Union: Iran

Envoy
- Kaja Kallas: Abbas Araghchi

European flag crossed with the Iranian opposition flag

European Union–Iran relations are the bilateral relations between Iran and the European Union (EU). The EU is Iran's largest trading partner, along with China and the United Arab Emirates. Trade with Iran is subject to the general EU import regime and the EU supports the goal of Iranian accession to the World Trade Organization (WTO). The EU has accused and criticised Iran for human rights violations, which led to diplomatic tensions, but both sides aim at improving and normalising relations. Should Armenia, which is planning to apply for EU membership, and Turkey, which is a candidate for EU membership, accede to the EU, Iran will be a border neighbor with the European Union.

As of 2019, the Iran–EU trade relations are stained due to the sanctions re-imposed on Iran by the United States after the US unilateral withdrawal from the multinational Joint Comprehensive Plan of Action agreement. The EU has, however, established a special Instrument in Support of Trade Exchanges to enable EU–Iran trade bypassing the US sanctions. In fact, the EU were seen to be "urging Chinese and Russian counterparts to do more to support bilateral economic ties with Iran". Nonetheless, the European Union imposed sanctions against Iranian individuals and organisations over human rights abuses in Iran in 2022. The EU also blacklisted eight drone makers and airforce commanders in response to Tehran's supply of weapons to Russia. In 2023, the European Union adopted an eighth package of sanctions on Iran, thereby significantly expanding the scope of sanctions against Tehran. In May 2024, the EU broadened its sanctions regime to cover Iran’s missile program. On 29 January 2026, the European Union designated Iran's Revolutionary Guards as a terrorist organisation in response to the violent crackdowns during the protests which resulted in the deaths of an estimated thousands of protesters. In addition they advocated for further sanctions on Iran's interior minister along with fourteen additional high-ranking officials. Iran, in turn, designated the militaries of all European Union member states as terrorist organisations.

In February 2026, the Group of Friends in Defence of the Charter of the United Nations issued a statement condemning recent actions taken by the European Union against the Islamic Republic of Iran and the Islamic Revolutionary Guard Corps (IRGC). The group rejected the EU’s designation of the IRGC as a terrorist organisation, characterising the measures as politically motivated and in violation of the principles of international law and the UN Charter. The statement reaffirmed the group’s support for Iran and criticised the use of unilateral coercive actions by the EU.

== History ==
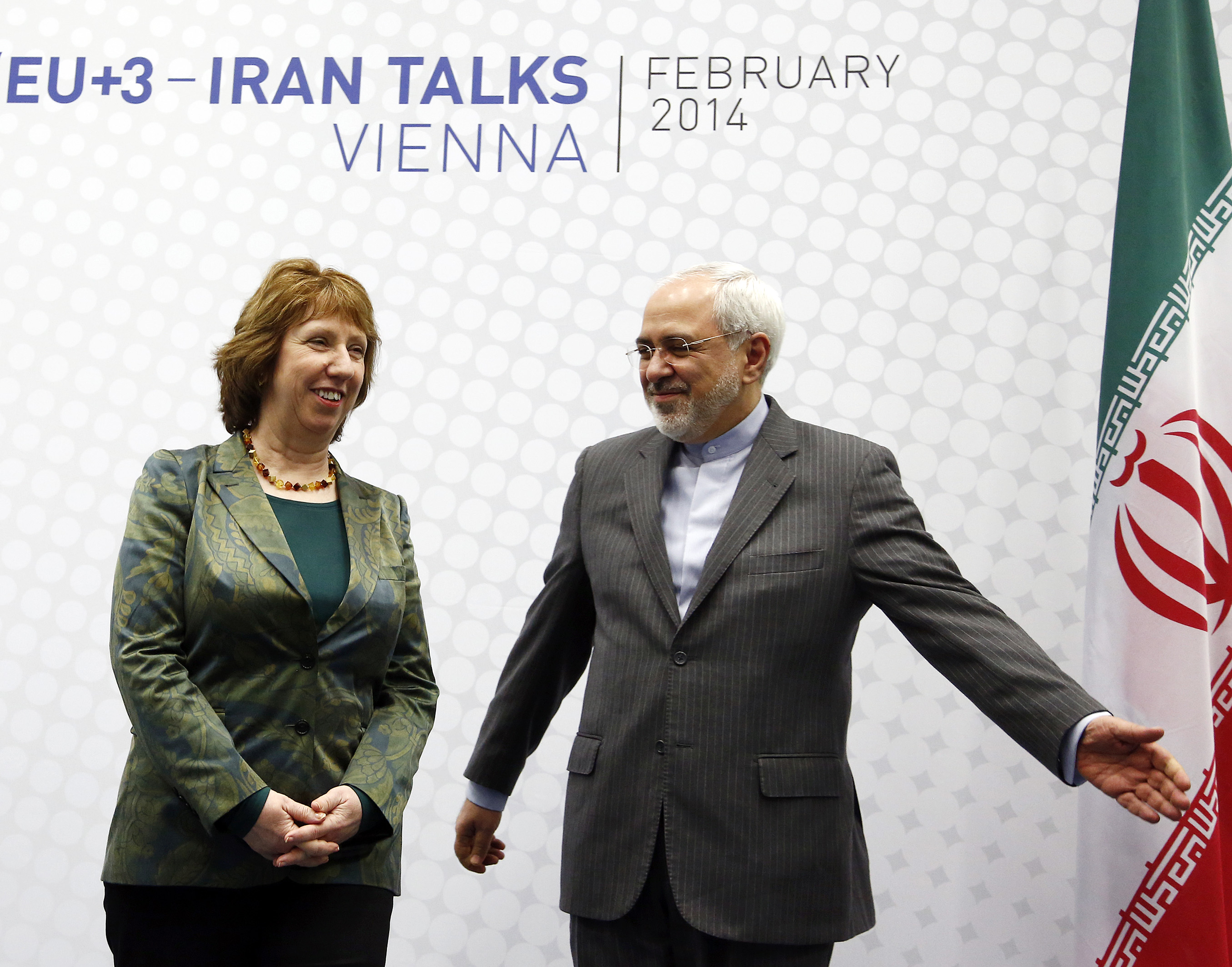
High Representative of the European Union for Foreign Affairs and Security Policy Catherine Ashton meets with Iranian Foreign Minister Mohammad Javad Zarif in Vienna, 18 February 2014

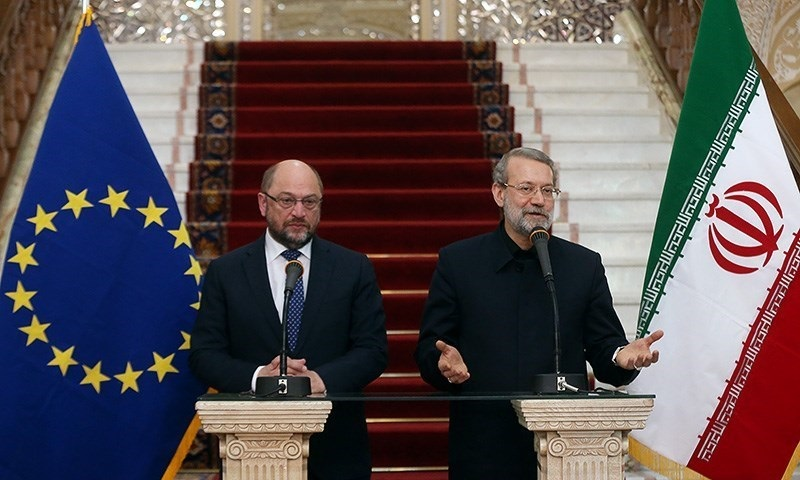
European Parliament President Martin Schulz with Iran's Parliament Speaker Ali Larijani in Tehran, November 2015

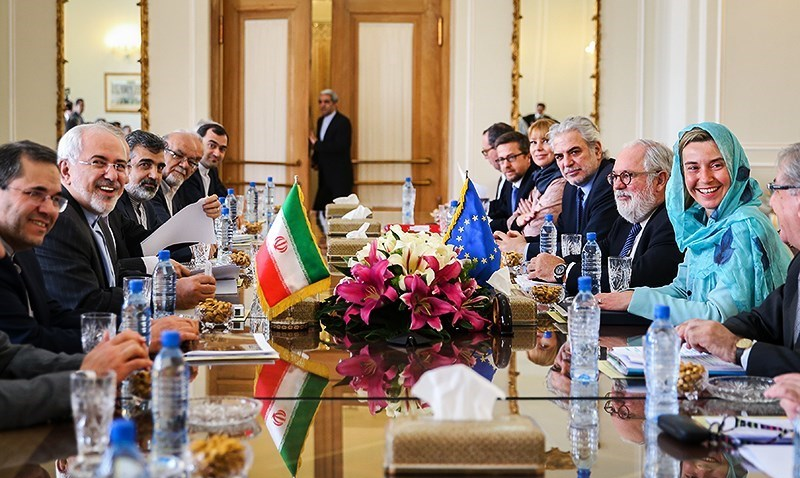
Mohammad Javad Zarif and Federica Mogherini holding talks in Tehran (April 2016)

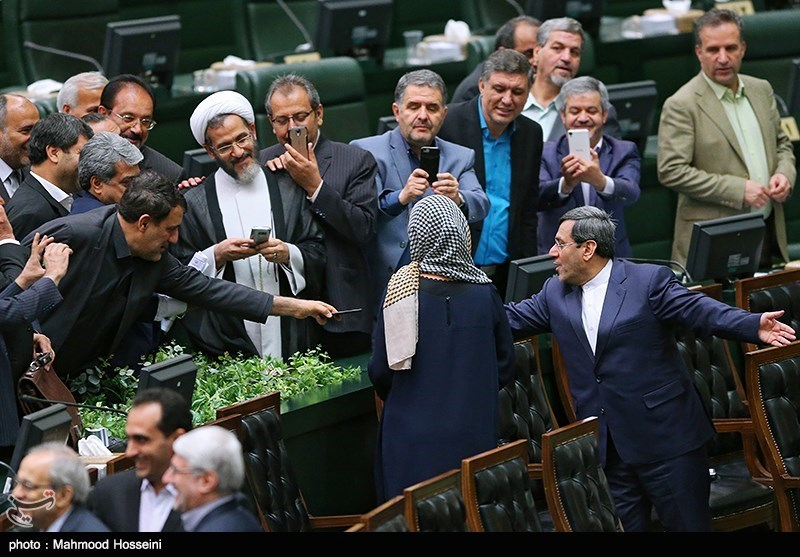
Iranian members of parliament taking selfies with Federica Mogherini, 2017

In December 2013, eight representatives of the European Parliament were on an official visit to Tehran to improve relations between Iran and the European Union. The delegation for relations with Iran was under the leadership of the Finnish politician Tarja Cronberg. A number of different talks and meetings were held, first with Fatmeh Rahbar, a conservative member and Chairman of Women Fraction of the Iranian Parliament and later with human rights lawyer Nasrin Sotoudeh and film producer Jafar Panahi, both recipients of the Sakharov Prize in 2012. The talks were however criticised by German political figures, including Markus Löning, Commissioner for Human Rights Policy and Humanitarian Aid of the German foreign ministry, due to the ongoing human rights abuses by the Iranian government and continued executions of accused criminals. The last meetings took place six years ago and several previous attempts failed to reinitiate such talks with Iranian officials and representatives of Iranian culture. Serious criticism was also voiced by the American Jewish Committee.

=== Iranian nuclear program ===
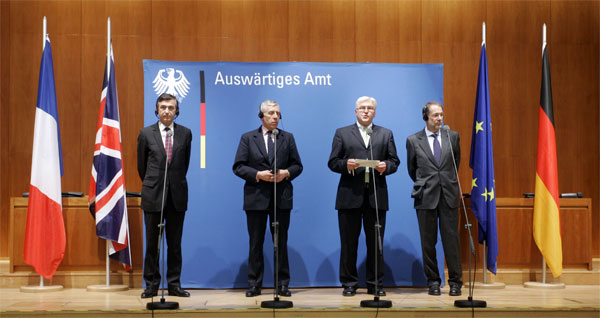
The foreign ministers from each of the EU three and former High Representative Javier Solana in 2006.

The EU supports the Treaty on the Non-Proliferation of Nuclear Weapons, which entered into force on 5 March 1970. Iran ratified this treaty assuring the international community that it will use nuclear energy for peaceful purposes.

In 2003, it was discovered by the International Atomic Energy Agency (IAEA) that Iran is conducting secret activities with nuclear materials. Iran's refusal to cooperate proactively with the IAEA and its resistance to report to the United Nations Security Council (UNSC) led to a diplomatic effort by the European Council and its three members France, Germany and the United Kingdom to resolve this issue through negotiations. They were joined in 2004 by the EU High Representative, and thus offering support by all EU members. Subsequently, in 2005 and 2006, extensive proposals to facilitate peaceful nuclear energy usage were again presented to the Iranian authorities. Even with the support of China, Russia and the United States through these proposals, Iran could not be convinced to follow the requests by the IAEA. As a result, four resolutions (N° 1696, 1737, 1747 and 1803) were put in place by the United Nations Security Council: they demanded to suspend all Uranium-235 enrichment and heavy water activities and restricted acquisition of nuclear and ballistic materials by Iran. Those policies were reiterated in 2008 by the EU.

The continuing refusal by Iranian authority to make clear declarations and to allow sufficient inspections of their nuclear facilities then convinced the EU to enforce additional sanctions on civilian goods and services such as financial activities and energy sector technologies. In 2012, an oil embargo and restrictive financial boycotts were enforced by the EU, in addition to UN sanctions against Iran. It was not until 8 December 2013, when Iranian authorities based on a historic deal reached in Geneva on 24 November 2013 with the so-called P5+1 group (Britain, China, France, Russia, the United States, and Germany) allowed UN nuclear inspectors to visit a heavy water facility after announcing that plutonium enrichment has been suspended. The deal puts Uranium enrichment by Iran on hold for at least eight months, and is paving the way for direct talks between the US and the Islamic Republic. Additionally, Iran is required to dilute existing enriched Uranium stockpiles to a concentration of 20%. While the economic boycotts and material restriction are still in place, a step-by-step reduction of these embargoes by the EU will likely be implemented.

In 2015, Iran reached the Joint Comprehensive Plan of Action agreement on the Iranian nuclear program in Vienna on 14 July 2015, with the P5+1 (the five permanent members of the United Nations Security Council—China, France, Russia, United Kingdom, United States—plus Germany), and the European Union. This enabled Iran to normalise its trade relations with the EU. in 2019, United States unilaterally abandoned observing the agreement and unilaterally reimposed sanctions against Iran, which was described by then-British Ambassador to the United States Kim Darroch as "diplomatic vandalism". The EU established the Instrument in Support of Trade Exchanges to bypass the reimposed US sanctions.

On 13 May 2022, the European Union said that it felt it had given stalled negotiations to resuscitate the 2015 Iran nuclear deal new life.

=== 2026 Israeli–United States strikes on Iran ===
Ahead of the planned U.S. and Israeli strikes on Iran on 27 February 2026, European Union member states urged their citizens to leave Iran and other Middle Eastern countries as soon as possible or to avoid travelling to these regions. On 28 February 2026, President of the European Council António Costa and President of the European Commission Ursula von der Leyen stated that the European Union was closely monitoring events in Iran and called on Iran to return to diplomacy as soon as possible.

In March 2026, Ursula von der Leyen declared the traditional 'rules-based' international order finished, advocating for a more interest-driven and realistic EU foreign policy in response to rising global instability. Addressing the U.S.-Israeli strikes on Iran, she argued 'no tears should be shed' for the Iranian regime, despite noting security risks to Europe. This rhetoric, particularly her dismissal of the rules-based framework, sparked significant criticism from several EU capitals and threats of a no-confidence motion from S&D lawmakers.

== Trade ==
In 2008, Iranian exports to the EU amounted to €11.3 billion and imports from the EU amounted to €14.1 billion. EU exports to Iran are mainly machinery and transport (54.6%), manufactured goods (16.9%) and chemicals (12.1%). In 2011, Iran ranked 7th in exporting crude oil to Europe and a Eurostat report stated that 27 European states imported 11.4 billion Euros of goods from Iran in the first nine months of 2011. There is significant room for growth, though this is hampered by the nuclear dispute. A Trade and Cooperation Agreement was installed in 2002 but has been on hold since 2005 because of the dispute. There are no bilateral treaties as Iran is not a member of the WTO. On 23 June 2016, the United Kingdom voted to leave the European Union, a move which was praised by senior Iranian officials as a potential gateway for trade expansion with Europe.

European sanctions do not affect Iran's electricity exports, which creates a loophole for Iran's natural gas reserves.

At the sixth Iran-Europe Banking and Business Forum in Tehran in April 2018, Iran's outgoing ambassador to Germany Ali Majedi announced that Middle East Bank, Saman Bank, and Sina Bank were planning to open branches in German cities to increase Iran's trade relations with Europe.

On 20 October 2018, Association of German Banks stated that exports from Germany to Iran has reduced to 1.8 billion euros since January. In 2019, the Instrument in Support of Trade Exchanges has become the main vehicle for EU–Iran trade bypassing the US sanctions.

== Iran's foreign relations with EU member states ==
- Austria
- Belgium
- Bulgaria
- Croatia
- Cyprus
- Czech Republic
- Denmark
- Estonia
- Finland
- France
- Germany
- Greece
- Hungary
- (Republic of Ireland) Ireland
- Italy
- Latvia
- Lithuania
- Luxembourg
- Malta
- Netherlands
- Poland
- Portugal
- Romania
- Slovakia
- Slovenia
- Spain
- Sweden

== See also ==
- Foreign relations of the European Union
- Foreign relations of Iran
- Foreign Direct Investment in Iran
- Human rights in Iran
- Iran–United Kingdom relations
- Iran–United States relations
- France–Iran relations
- Germany–Iran relations
- Iran–Italy relations
- Iran–Spain relations
- Iran–Netherlands relations
- Iran–Poland relations
- Bulgaria–Iran relations
- Greece–Iran relations
- Finland–Iran relations
- Turkey–European Union relations
