= Roman–Iranian relations =

Historical relationship between the Roman and Iranian empires

Relations between Ancient Rome and the empires of Ancient Iran (notably the Parthian and Sassanian empires) were defined with a political rivalry between the two great powers that would dominate much of West Asia and Europe and lead to many wars. The Roman Republic and the Parthian Empire would first establish relations c. 92 BC, and their rivalry continued through their various successor states to the seventh century AD.

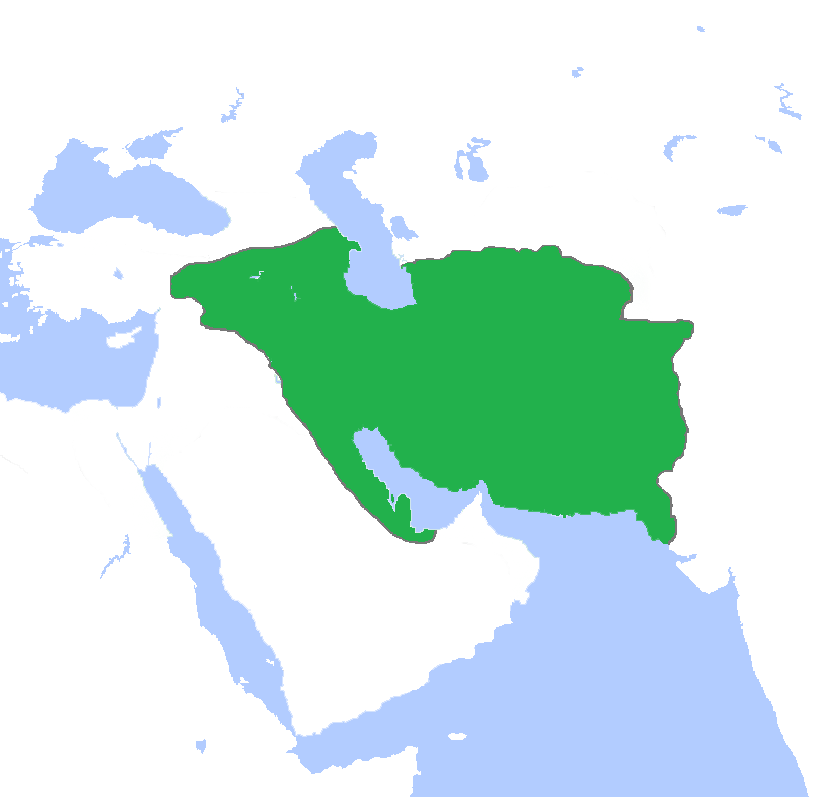
Parthia's greatest extent

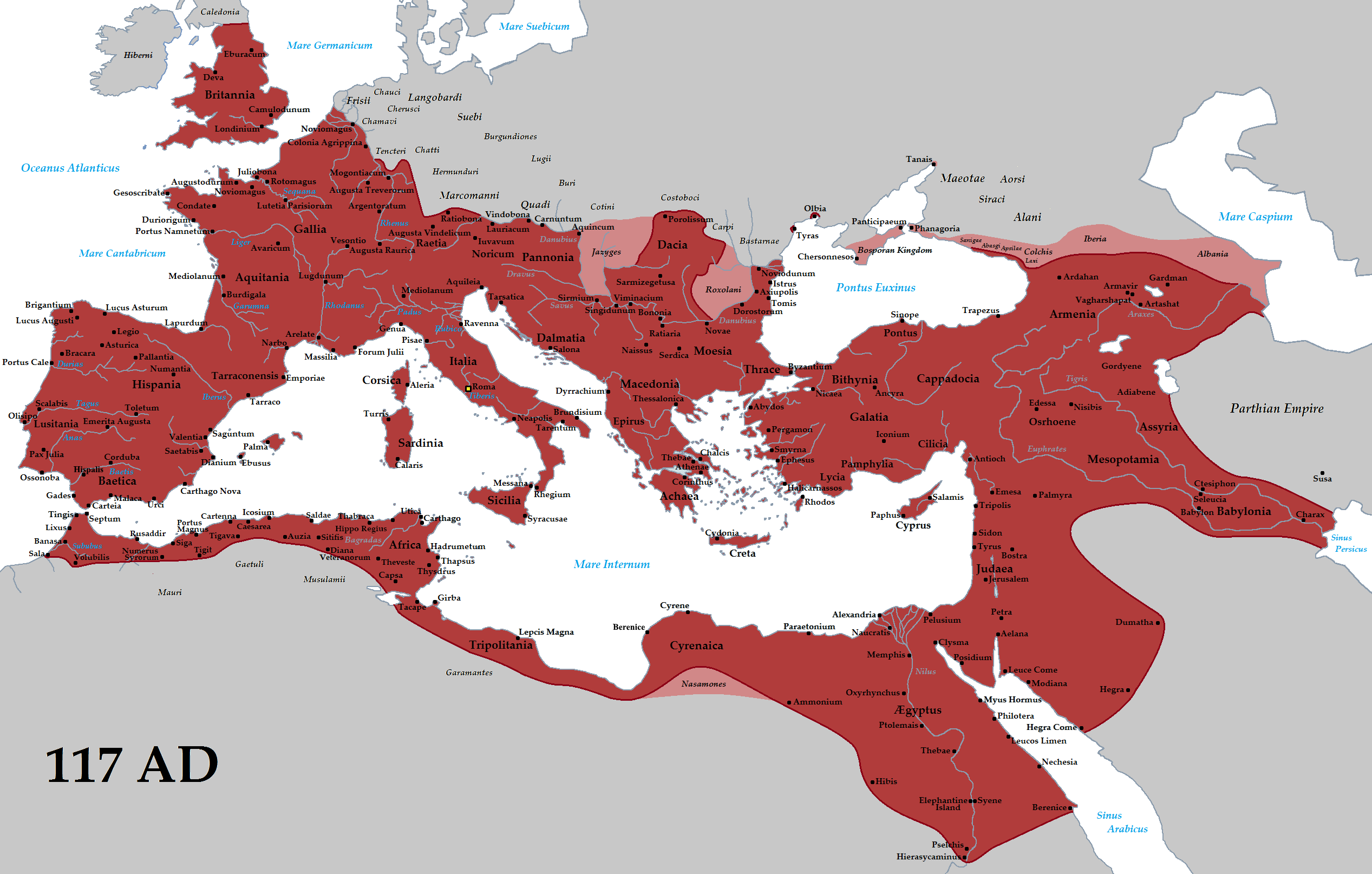
The Roman Empire's greatest extent

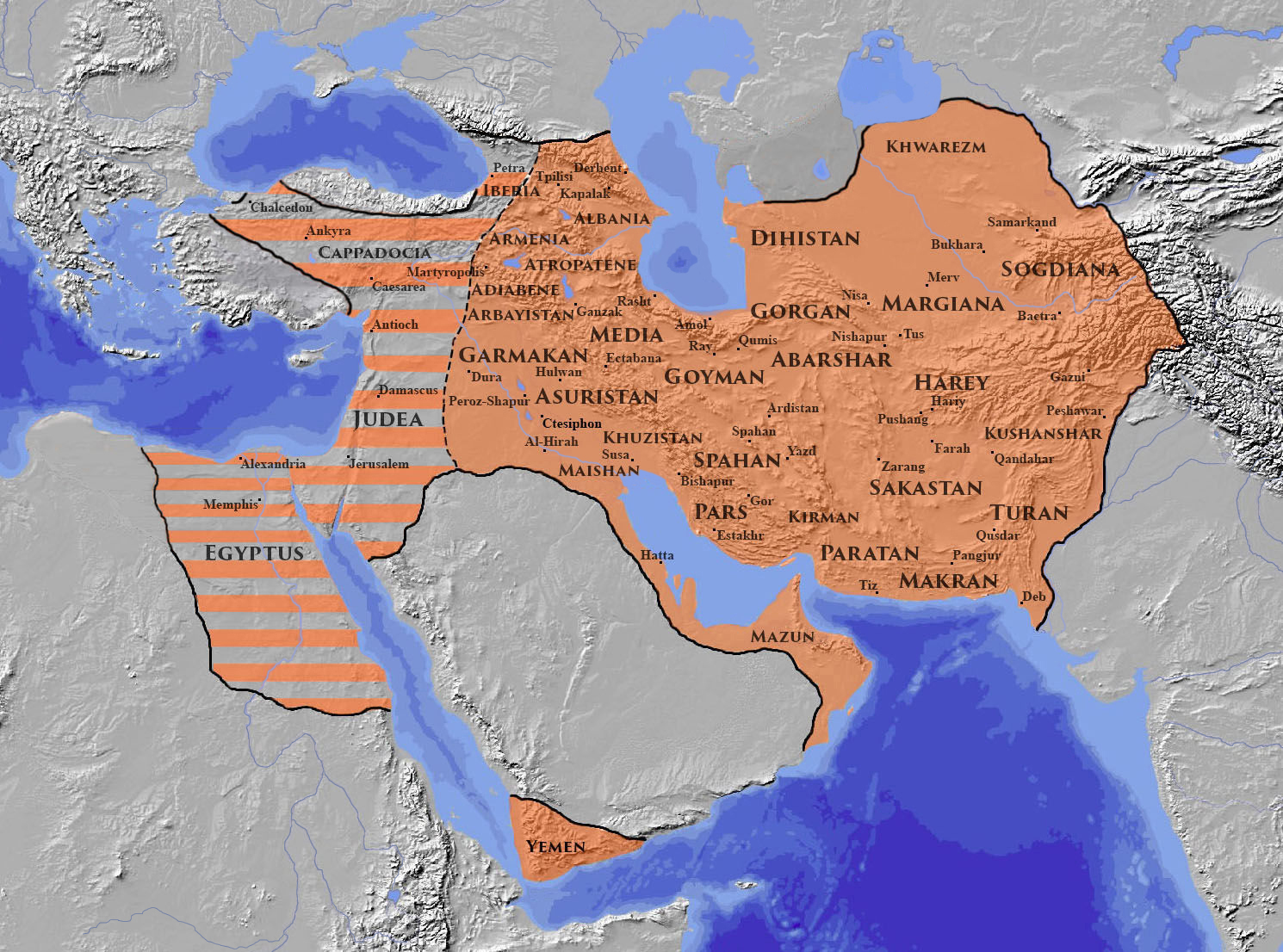
Sassanid Persia's territorial extent (and maximum extent)

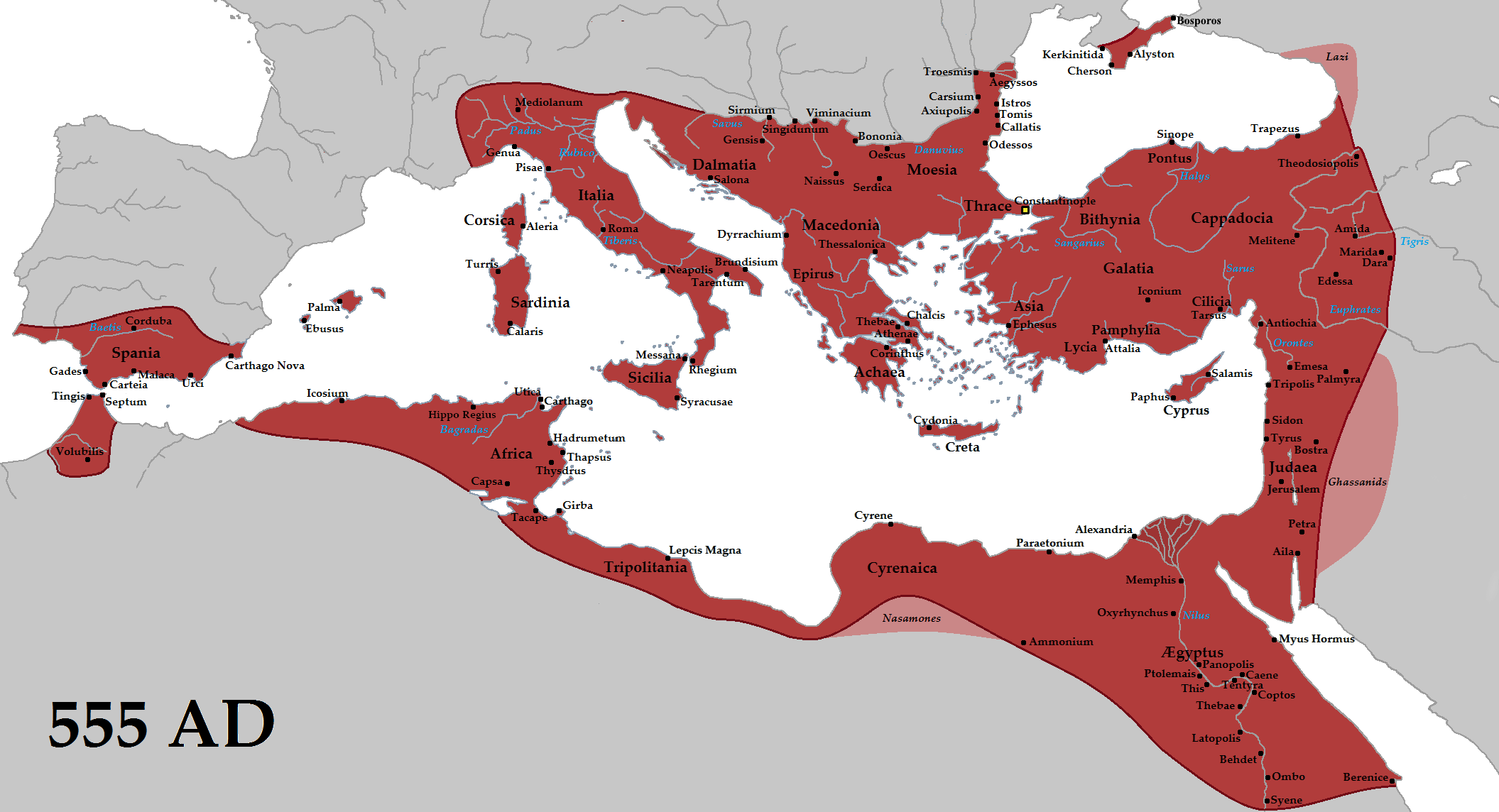
The Byzantine Empire's greatest extent under Justinian

== Relations between the Roman Republic and Parthian Empire ==
The first direct contact between the Roman Republic and the Parthians was c. 92 BC, when Lucius Cornelius Sulla, while proconsul in Cilicia, met the Parthian ambassador Orobazus. Plutarch reports that he managed to take the central seat between the Parthian Ambassador and an ambassador from Pontus, and concluded a treaty that set the Euphrates as the boundary between the two powers. Orobazus was executed on his return to Parthia for allowing Sulla to outmaneuver him, and Sulla himself later came under criticism for being too high-handed in his treatment of such a powerful nation.

The first time the Romans came into direct military contact with Parthia came when Lucullus invaded Armenia in 69 BC, leading to diplomatic friction and clashes on the frontier between Armenia and Parthia. Over the following decades both empires became entangled in each other's civil wars, perhaps beginning with Crassus’s disastrous invasion of Parthia. Parthia was later involved in the civil war after the assassination of Julius Caesar. In 42 BC, when Antony placed a legion in Syria, Cassius’ envoy Labienus joined forces with king Orodes of Parthia and, led by Pacorus, attacked the Levant and the Asia Minor. However, this was not to last as Antony successfully sent his general Publius Ventidius Bassus to recover the lost territory. After some difficulty dealing with local Parthian appointee kings, the Romans finally subdued the regained province and installed Herod the Great as king. Antony’s forces attempted a crossing of the Euphrates at the city of Zeugma but were held back by Parthian defences and had to settle for annexing the Armenian kingdom after deposing its king.

== Relations between the Roman Empire and Parthian Empire ==
=== Julio-Claudian dynasty ===
Augustus was loath to seek further conflict with Parthia. However, the coveted standards were still held by the Parthians and this was of great concern to Augustus, forcing him to regain them through a less conventional method. Augustus set up Musa of Parthia as a client Queen. Indeed Musa was an Italian servant-girl who was given to the Parthian monarch Phraates IV (r. 37 BC – 2 BC) as a gift by the Roman Emperor Augustus. Musa quickly became queen and a favourite of Phraates IV, giving birth to Phraataces (Phraates V) about 19 BC. In 2 BC, Musa had Phraates IV poisoned and made herself along with Phraates V the co-rulers of the Parthian Empire. After a short rule, the Parthian nobility, angered by Phraates V's recent acknowledgement of Roman suzerainty in Armenia and his mother's Italian descent, deposed them both from the throne in 4 AD and installed Orodes III as king. Phraates V and Musa fled to Rome, where Augustus welcomed them.

The next half century saw relations between the two nations antagonistic but not overtly hostile, with the Romans unsuccessfully supporting a series of pretender kings, including Claudius in 49 CE, indicating the extent to which Rome was attempting to influence Parthian politics for its own ends. However, during the reign of Nero, Vologases I invaded Armenia and installed his own brother on the throne, disrupting the balance of influence which had hitherto existed there. The ensuing war was ended by a compromise which allowed the Parthian prince Tiridates and his descendants to reign in Armenia on condition that he and his successors received their crown from the Roman emperor and ruled as his clients.

Strabo described the Parthian Empire as the only rival existing to Rome.

=== Relations during the Flavian dynasty ===
During Vespasian’s rule Parthia seemed to make some attempts to strengthening the ties between the two powers, such as asking to form an alliance at the Caucasus against belligerent Sarmatian tribes and offering assistance to Vespasian against the short lived emperor Vitellius once it became clear that Vespasian would rule. However, both of these Vespasian refused.

=== Relations in later antiquity ===
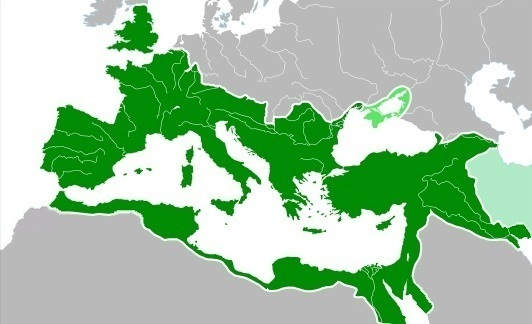
Map of the Roman empire in 116–117 AD showing the Trajan conquests in Dacia & Mesopotamia and his control with a "client state" of western Parthia (light green color)

In the 2nd century CE, the balance of power shifted emphatically in favour of the Romans. A series of invasions repeatedly overran Mesopotamia and sacked the Parthian capital of Ctesiphon, made substantial territorial gains in northern Mesopotamia and benefited from the manipulation of frequent Parthian dynastic civil wars, which eventually undermined the Parthian state.

In 113 AD, Trajan invaded Parthia, marching first on Armenia. In 114 AD, he annexed Armenia to the Roman empire, after defeating and killing Parthamasiris, relative of Osroes I of Parthia. Successively he turned south into Parthia itself, taking the cities of Babylon, Seleucia and finally the capital of Ctesiphon in 116 AD. Then Trajan declared Mesopotamia a new province of the Empire. In the process, he also captured the great city of Susa in Khuzestan. Those months of 116 and 117 saw western Parthia as a client state of the Romans.

Trajan originally planned to annex Parthia as part of the Roman Empire, but ultimately decided instead to place Parthamaspates on the throne as a Roman client, doing so in late 116 AD. After the sudden death of Trajan, his successor Hadrian decided that the Roman Empire was too much extended to the east and accepted in late 117 AD a Treaty with the Parthians in which renounced to nearly all the conquests of Trajan in the region.

War over Armenia broke out again in 161 AD, when Vologases IV defeated the Romans there, captured Edessa and ravaged Syria. But soon, in 163 AD, a Roman counter-attack under Statius Priscus defeated the Parthians in Armenia and installed a favored candidate on the Armenian throne.

The following year Avidius Cassius began an invasion of Mesopotamia, winning battles at Dura-Europos and Seleucia and sacking Ctesiphon in 165 AD.

The Antonine plague, possibly of smallpox, which was sweeping Parthia at the time now spread to the Roman army, leading to their withdrawal: the plague killed nearly half of the population in the Italian peninsula (for some months there were nearly 3000 deaths each day in the city of Rome) and the Romans' legions in the eastern territories of their empire were hampered when large numbers of troops succumbed to the disease. With the plague the Roman Empire stopped to grow and started a process of slow disintegration in the next centuries, according to historians like Theodor Mommsen.

However, under Caracalla, an interesting twist in Parthian relations occurred. After submitting a request to marry the daughter of Persian king Artabanus IV (potentially allowing an heir to assume control of both empires), Caracalla massacred the diplomatic party sent to arrange the marriage and attempted an invasion of Persia in 216 AD. This was eventually unsuccessful and the Persians soon retaliated, inflicting heavy losses upon the Romans.

== Relations between the Roman Empire/Byzantine Empire and Sassanian Empire ==
The replacement of the Parthian Empire by that of the Sassanids in 226 CE, which was more stable and effectively organised, shifted the balance of power against the Romans. The neighboring rivaling Sasanian Empire and the Roman-Byzantine Empire were recognized as the two leading world powers, for a period of more than 400 years.

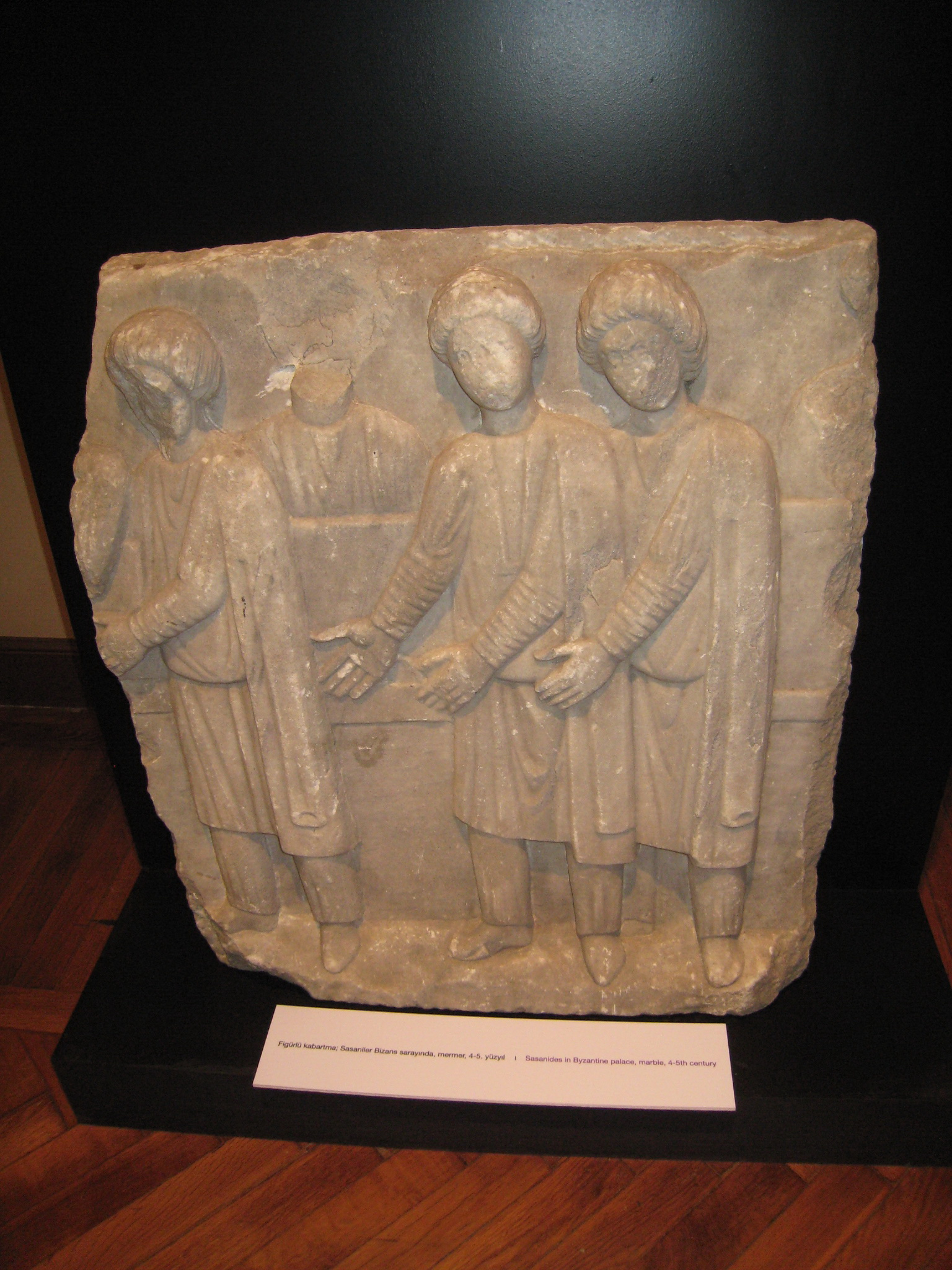
Sasanian embassy to Byzantine Empire, stone relief in Istanbul Archaeological Museums, Turkey

Frequent Persian aggression during the 3rd century placed Roman defences under severe strain, but the Romans were eventually successful in warding these off and avoiding any territorial losses. Indeed, they eventually made significant gains towards the end of the century, although these were reversed in the mid-4th century. By that time conflicts attained an added religious dimension. It is in this context that the future of Roman–Persian relations would be played out over the remaining centuries, continuing into the Byzantine era. Neither side was able to inflict a decisive and convincing military victory against the other, and the movement between hostilities and diplomacy would continue to play out between each power.

According to some sources, two years before his death, Shapur I married a daughter of Aurelian, and attempted to further Romanize the city of Gundeshapur, which was mainly populated by the Roman prisoners-of-war back then.

In 395 AD, 18,000 Roman populations of Sophene, Armenia, Mesopotamia, Syria, and Cappadocia were captured and deported by the "Huns". the prisoners were freed by the Persians as they reached Persia, and were settled in Slōk (Wēh Ardashīr) and Kōkbā (Kōkhē). The author of the text Liber Calipharum has praised the king Yazdegerd I (399–420) for his treatment of the deportees, who also allowed some to return.

In the 5th century, Romans provided a subsidy as the Sassanians requested, to construct defenses in Derbent, through which incursions from tribes of the northern steppes endangered both empires.

Due to the increase in diplomatic relations between the Empires throughout the medieval period, a visual culture of kingship grew between the Romans and the Persians in the 6th and 7th centuries. In addition, alongside the advancement of diplomatic ties, familial, often flowery and ornate, language also became a significant metaphor to describe the various features of the Romano-Persian political relationship, since it was something both Empires had substantial indigenous predecessors for. Furthermore, these Roman-Persian diplomatic relations peaked during the 6th century, due to extensive communication between Roman emperor Justinian and Persian emperor Khosrow I.

== See also ==
- Iran–Italy relations
- Greece–Iran relations
- Parthia
- Romans in Persia
- Roman Empire
- Byzantine Empire
- Roman–Persian Wars
  - Roman–Parthian Wars
- Sasanian dynasty
- Acacius of Amida
- Mithraic mysteries
