= New International Economic Order =

Proposals for ending perceived economic colonialism

The New International Economic Order (NIEO) is a set of proposals advocated by developing countries to end economic colonialism and dependency through a new interdependent economy. The main NIEO document recognized that the current international economic order "was established at a time when most of the developing countries did not even exist as independent states and which perpetuates inequality". In the spirit of "trade not aid", the NIEO called for changes in trade, industrialization, agricultural production, finance, and transfer of technology. The United Nations General Assembly adopted the "Declaration on the Establishment of a New International Economic Order" and its accompanying program of action on 1 May 1974.

== History ==
=== Antecedent international economic order ===
The United Nations' Declaration on the Establishment of a New International Economic Order (1974) argued that the international economic order then prevailing was unjust and inequitable, no longer serving the needs of either the affluent countries or the developing world. The antecedent order allocated only 30% of the world's income to the 70% of the global population who lived in the developing world, making it impossible to foster balanced development on a global basis and failed to recognise the interdependence of the affluent countries and the developing world.

=== Emergence of a proposal for change ===
The idea of a new international economic order emerged from the experiences of decolonization after the Second World War. Newly decolonized countries gained political sovereignty but "felt that their de jure political colonization ended only to be replaced by a de facto economic colonization." This mission to achieve a more equitable international system was motivated also by increasing inequality in the share of global national income between developed and underdeveloped countries, which more than doubled between 1938 and 1966. From its beginnings in 1964, the United Nations Conference on Trade and Development (UNCTAD), along with the associated Group of 77 and the Non-Aligned Movement, was the central forum for discussions of the NIEO.

Key themes of the NIEO included both sovereign equality and the right of self-determination, especially when it comes to sovereignty over natural resources. Another key theme was the need for a new commodity order through international commodity agreements and a common fund for commodity price stabilization. Restructuring international trade was also central as a means to improve developing countries' terms of trade, such as by diversifying developing economies through industrialization, integrating developing countries economies into regional free trade blocs like the Caribbean Community, reducing developed-country tariffs and other obstacles to free trade, expanding generalized trade preferences, and designing other agreements to reduce trade barriers. These proposals to restructure the international economic system also sought to reform the Bretton Woods system, which had benefited the leading states that had created it – especially the United States. This set of proposals proclaimed that facilitating the rate of economic development and market share among developing countries will fight global issues such as hunger and despair more effectively than the current focus on philanthropy and development aid. This advocacy among nations of the Non-Aligned Movement can also be understood as an extension of the decolonization movement that was present in many developing countries during that time. In this perspective, political and economic equity were perceived as a metric to measure the success of independence movements and completing the decolonization process.

In 1974, the United Nations General Assembly adopted the "Declaration for the Establishment of a New International Economic Order" along with its accompanying program of action and formalized this sentiment among nation states. A few months later the UN General Assembly adopted the "Charter of Economic Rights and Duties of States". Since then, there have been many meetings to realize the NIEO. In 2018, the United Nations General Assembly adopted the resolution "Towards a New International Economic Order", which reaffirmed "the need to continue working towards a new international economic order based on the principles of equity, sovereign equality, interdependence, common interest, cooperation and solidarity among all States."

== Principles and proposed reforms ==
The main principles of the original NIEO are:

1. The sovereign equality of all States, with non-interference in their internal affairs, their effective participation in solving world problems and the right to adopt their own economic and social systems;
2. Full sovereignty of each State over its natural resources and other economic activities necessary for development, as well as regulation of transnational corporations;
3. Just and equitable relationship between the price of raw materials and other goods exported by developing countries, and the prices of raw materials and other goods exported by the developed countries;
4. Strengthening of bilateral and multilateral international assistance to promote industrialization in the developing countries through, in particular, the provisioning of sufficient financial resources and opportunities for transfer of appropriate techniques and technologies.

The main reforms required by the original NIEO are:

1. An overhaul of the rules of international trade, especially those concerning raw materials, food, the system of preferences and reciprocity, commodity agreements, transportation, and insurance.
2. A reform of the international monetary system and other financing mechanisms to bring them into line with development needs.
3. Both financial and technology transfer incentives and assistance for industrialization projects in developing countries. This industrialization is understood as essential for the diversification of economies, which during colonization focused on a very restricted range of raw materials.
4. Promotion of cooperation among the countries of the South, with a view to greater individual and collective autonomy, broader participation and enhanced involvement in international trade. This cooperation is called Economic Cooperation among Development Countries, which replaces colonial dependence with new interrelationships among developing countries based on trade, production, and markets and builds collective self-reliance.

Renewed NIEO proposals - generated to mark the 50th anniversary of the original proposals - include additional principles such as the need to address a "rapidly changing climate".

== Legacy ==
The United States government rejected the NIEO almost immediately. Neoconservatives and libertarians criticized the NIEO and became influential in US foreign policy circles. For example, economist Harry Johnson criticized the NIEO for using central planning and monopolistic power to extort transfers of income and wealth from the developed countries. In his view, commanding prices for raw materials above their natural level usually reduces consumption and thus causes unemployment among producers, and price regulation typically gives the extra income to those in control of who is allowed to produce, e.g., to governments or land-owners. Newly elected President Ronald Reagan took these calls for market-led foreign policy to the North–South Summit in Cancun in 1981, where, according to historian Michael Franczak, "Reagan promised the attending heads of state that private investment and free markets were the surest path to development, prosperity, and, yes, democracy."

Within the context of the worldwide debt crisis in the 1980s, it was very difficult to realize the NIEO. Unrealized NIEO proposals contributed to the formulation of the "Right to Development" in 1986. From the 1980s onward, the Washington Consensus and economic globalization on terms often described as neoliberal became dominant. The economic reach of multinational corporations, rather than being circumscribed, would be expanded significantly. Trade in commodities would shift away from state-dominated cartels towards increasingly financialized markets. The formation of the World Trade Organization and the proliferation of free trade agreements would compel the reduction of barriers to trade, generally on strictly reciprocal terms.

Parts of the NIEO were realized, such as the non-legal, non-binding Restrictive Business Practice Code adopted in 1980 and the Common Fund for Commodities, which came in force in 1989. In addition, in World Trade Organization, Matsushita et al. state, "The realization of the New International Economic Order was an impetus for developing country support for the Tokyo Round of trade negotiations. Critics of the WTO continue to state that little of substance for developing countries came out of either the Tokyo or Uruguay Rounds. The adoption of the 1974 Declaration and the much more recent 2018 resolution "Towards a New International Economic Order" keeps the ideas of the NIEO visible in the policy arena.

In the 21st century, the idea of an NIEO has been endorsed by the Group of Friends in Defense of the Charter of the United Nations.

In addition, to mark the 50 year anniversary of the original NIEO proposals in 2024, Progressive International convened a global 2-year process to update the original NIEO. The renewed NIEO proposals were published in September 2024.

== See also ==
- Group of 77
- New international division of labour
- New World Information and Communication Order (New International Information Order, NIIO)
- Non-Aligned Movement
- Trade justice
- Trade Justice Movement
- United Nations Conference on Trade and Development (UNCTAD)
- Washington Consensus
