= Croatia–Iran relations =

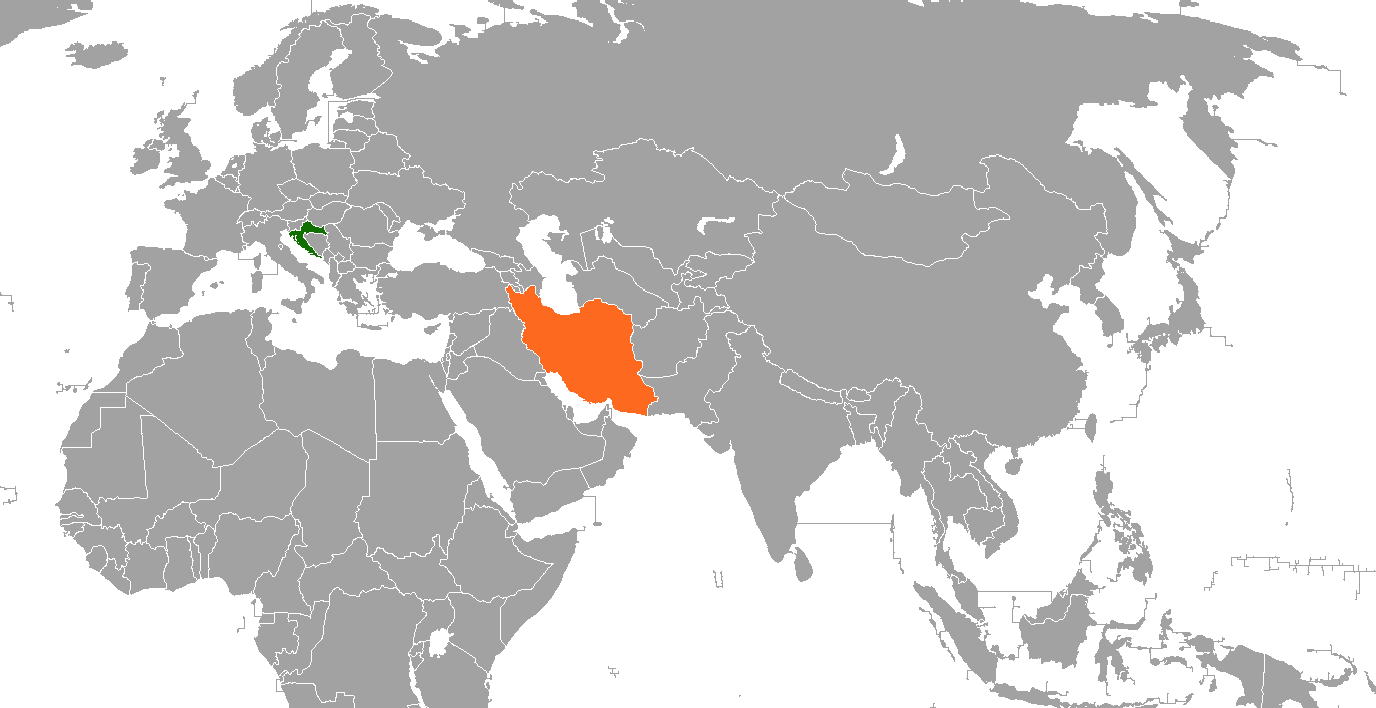

- Croatia: Iran

Diplomatic mission
- Croatian embassy in Tehran: Iranian embassy in Zagreb

Croatia and Iran established diplomatic relations on April 18, 1992 when Iran became the 7th country in the world and the first among Asian and Muslim-majority countries to recognize the newly independent Croatia. Croatia has an embassy in Tehran while Iran has an embassy and a cultural center in Zagreb. Relations between the two countries are described as good and friendly.

== Relations ==
Iranian vice-president Hassan Habibi visited Croatia in 1995 while the Iranian president Mohammad Khatami visited Zagreb in 2005. Croatian president Stjepan Mesić had a three-day state visit to Iran in 2001. In 2008 Iranian president Mahmoud Ahmadinejad called for expansion of Iran-Croatia ties. During the same year, the Croatian national oil company INA expanded actively in the Ardabil Province.

In October 2011, a senior Iranian parliamentary delegation visited Croatia and met with President Ivo Josipović and Foreign Minister Gordan Jandroković.

President of the Iranian Parliament Ali Larijani met with the President of the Croatian Parliament Josip Leko in October 2013. Both of them expressed their desire to strengthen cooperation between Iran and Croatia in the field of economy, trade, culture, science, sports, agriculture and energy, as well as to expand parliamentary cooperation. Larijani stated that "Iran and Croatia have historical ties", while Leko stated that "Iran and Croatia base their relations on friendship and understanding".

Delegation of the Croatian-Iranian inter-parliamentary friendship group visited Tehran in March 2014, emphasizing the need for further development of relations between two countries. Just before this visit, Croatian President Josipović stressed Croatian desire for expand relations with Iran in the field of politics, economy and culture.

High representative of the Iranian Parliament, Hossein Sheikholeslam visited Croatia in October 2014 at the invitation of Mladen Novak, the President of the Croatian-Iranian Friendship Group of the Croatian Parliament. Delegation met with Foreign Minister Vesna Pusić, President Ivo Josipović, and President of the Croatian Parliament Josip Leko.

In January 2015, Croatian Foreign Minister Vesna Pusić visited Iran where she met with Iranian President Hassan Rouhani, Vice President Shahindokht Molaverdi, Vice President Masoumeh Ebtekar, Speaker of Parliament Ali Larijani and Foreign Minister Mohammad Javad Zarif. Minister Pusić pointed out that the time of her visit to Iran, which occurred during the negotiations on Iran nuclear deal, was "the right time to strengthen bilateral relations between Croatia and Iran". Pusić also stated that Croatia as EU member state strongly supports the efforts made by both sides in negotiations on Iran nuclear deal in order to ensure the successful completion of the negotiations. Minister Zarif pointed out that Pusić's visit to Iran would strengthen bilateral relations between two countries and that Croatia is extremely important Iranian partner within the European Union. Vice President and Head of Department of Environment Molaverdi was talking with Minister Pusić about strengthening bilateral cooperation between Iran and Croatia in the field of environmental protection. They all emphasized the importance of continuing the fight against terrorism, extremism and violence. During the visit, delegations agreed to set up in near future a mixed commission of economic experts.

== Economic relations ==
Economic cooperation between Croatia and Iran is low due to sanctions against Iran. In 2012 Croatia exported to Iran goods worth $2.9 million and imported from it goods worth $2.19 million.

On March 22, 2012 Croatia and other 27 European Union member states banned the import, purchase and transport of oil and oil and petrochemical products from Iran. It is also prohibited for Croatian companies to provide any financing or financial assistance, insurance or re-insurance related to the import, purchase or transport of Iranian crude oil and petroleum products. In addition, all Croatian citizens who sail under the Croatian flag are banned for selling and purchasing equipment that can be used in the oil industry in Iran.

CEOs of the Tobacco factory Rovinj and the Iranian Tobacco Company signed in 2010 a contract for building a joint tobacco factory in Iran. The factory was opened in 2013 in the town of Sari and is the largest tobacco factory in the Middle East. The investment is worth 30 million euros, and the capacity of the factory is 6 billion cigarettes a year.

During the visit of the Iranian delegation to Croatia in October 2011, a contact that focuses on cooperation in shipbuilding between the Iranian provinces Kermanshah and Khozestan and Croatian Split-Dalmatia County was signed. Iran and the Croatian shipyard in Rijeka had previously cooperated. This contract was eventually terminated due to the imposition of sanctions against Iran.

Iranian ambassador to Croatia Mohammad Taherian Fard stated in an interview for Večernji list in April 2015 that he received instructions directly from the President Hassan Rouhani to strengthen political, cultural and especially economic relations with Croatia. In addition, Ambassador also stated that Iran's strategic plan is to make Croatia a distributor of Iranian gas to many European countries.

On May 18, 2016, Croatian president Kolinda Grabar-Kitarović visited Iran, and signed Agreement on Economic Cooperation.

== Cultural relations ==
The Iran national football team in recently has been heavily influenced by football doctrines of Croatia, with Croatian managers dominate Iranian football scheme.

== Resident diplomatic missions ==
- Croatia has an embassy in Tehran.
- Iran has an embassy in Zagreb.

== See also ==
- Foreign relations of Croatia
- Foreign relations of Iran
- Iran–EU relations
- Yugoslavia and the Non-Aligned Movement
- Iran–Yugoslavia relations
