= Acacius of Amida =

Bishop of Amida, Mesopotamia

Saint Acacius of Amida

Bishop and Confessor
- Born: unknown
- Died: 425; Amida, Mesopotamia (modern-day Diyarbakır, Turkey)
- Venerated in: Roman Catholic Church; Eastern Orthodox Church
- Feast: April 9 (Roman Martyrology)

Acacius or Aqaq (died 425) was bishop of Amida, Mesopotamia (modern-day Turkey) from 400 to 425, during the reign of the Eastern Roman Emperor Theodosius II. He has no extant writings, but his life is documented by Socrates Scholasticus, in the 21st chapter of the 7th book of his Church History. There, he is described as freeing thousands of slaves.

== Full description by Socrates Scholasticus ==
The following is the full account in Socrates Scholastic, Church History, Book 7, Chapter 21, which records everything known from antiquity about Acacius.

A noble action of Acacius bishop of Amida, at that time greatly enhanced his reputation among all men. As the Roman soldiery would on no consideration restore to the Persian king the captives whom they had taken, these captives, about seven thousand in number, were being destroyed by famine in devastating Azazene, and this greatly distressed the king of the Persians. Then Acacius thought such a matter was by no means to be trifled with; having therefore assembled his clergy, he thus addressed them: 'Our God, my brethren, needs neither dishes nor cups; for he neither eats nor drinks, nor is in want of anything. Since then, by the liberality of its faithful members the church possesses many vessels both of gold and silver, it behooves us to sell them, that by the money thus raised we may be able to redeem the prisoners and also supply them with food.' Having said these things and many others similar to these, he ordered the vessels to be melted down, and from the proceeds paid the soldiers a ransom for their captives, whom he supported for some time; and then furnishing them with what was needful for their journey, sent them back to their sovereign. This benevolence on the part of the excellent Acacius, astonished the king of the Persians, as if the Romans were accustomed to conquer their enemies as well by their beneficence in peace as their prowess in war. They say also that the Persian king wished that Acacius should come into his presence, that he might have the pleasure of beholding such a man; a wish which by the emperor Theodosius' order was soon gratified. So signal a victory having through Divine favor been achieved by the Romans, many who were illustrious for their eloquence, wrote panegyrics in honor of the emperor, and recited them in public. The empress herself also composed a poem in heroic verse: for she had excellent literary taste; being the daughter of Leontius the Athenian sophist, she had been instructed in every kind of learning by her father; Atticus the bishop had baptized her a little while previous to her marriage with the emperor, and had then given her the Christian name of Eudocia, instead of her pagan one of Athenaïs. Many, as I have said, produced eulogiums on this occasion. Some, indeed, were stimulated by the desire of being noticed by the emperor; while others were anxious to display their talents to the masses, being unwilling that the attainments they had made by dint of great exertion should lie buried in obscurity.

== Life ==
At that time, there were seven thousand Persian prisoners who were captured by the Romans and held in Amida. Filled with the compassion at the sight of these men perishing from hunger and misery, Acacius resolved to help them. He assembled his clergy and addressed them in this manner:

Our God, my brethren, needs neither dishes nor cups; for He neither eats nor drinks, nor is in want of anything. Since then, by the liberality of its faithful members the Church possesses many vessels both of gold and silver, it behooves us to sell them, that by the money thus raised, we may be able to redeem the prisoners and also supply them with food.

Acacius sold all the precious golden and silver sacred vessels of his church and ransomed, clothed and fed the seven thousand. He even supported them for a while and furnished them with all that they needed to return to Persia.

When the ransomed captives returned home to Persia, they told their ruler of the great deeds performed by Acacius. His actions so impressed the Sassanid Emperor Bahram V that he is said to have ceased for a time from persecuting the Christians.

Persian Emperor Bahram V also desired to see Acacius face-to-face. Permission to do just that was given to Acacius by Emperor Theodosius II. Acacius' kindness and charity led to the termination of hostilities between the Eastern Roman Empire and the Sassanid Empire, and Christianity was able to flourish for a while in the areas then controlled by the Sassanid Persians.

Saint Acacius' feast day is celebrated on April 9 (Roman Martyrology).

== See also ==
- List of Catholic saints
- Roman-Persian Wars
- Roman relations with the Parthians and Sassanids
