= Iran–Serbia relations =

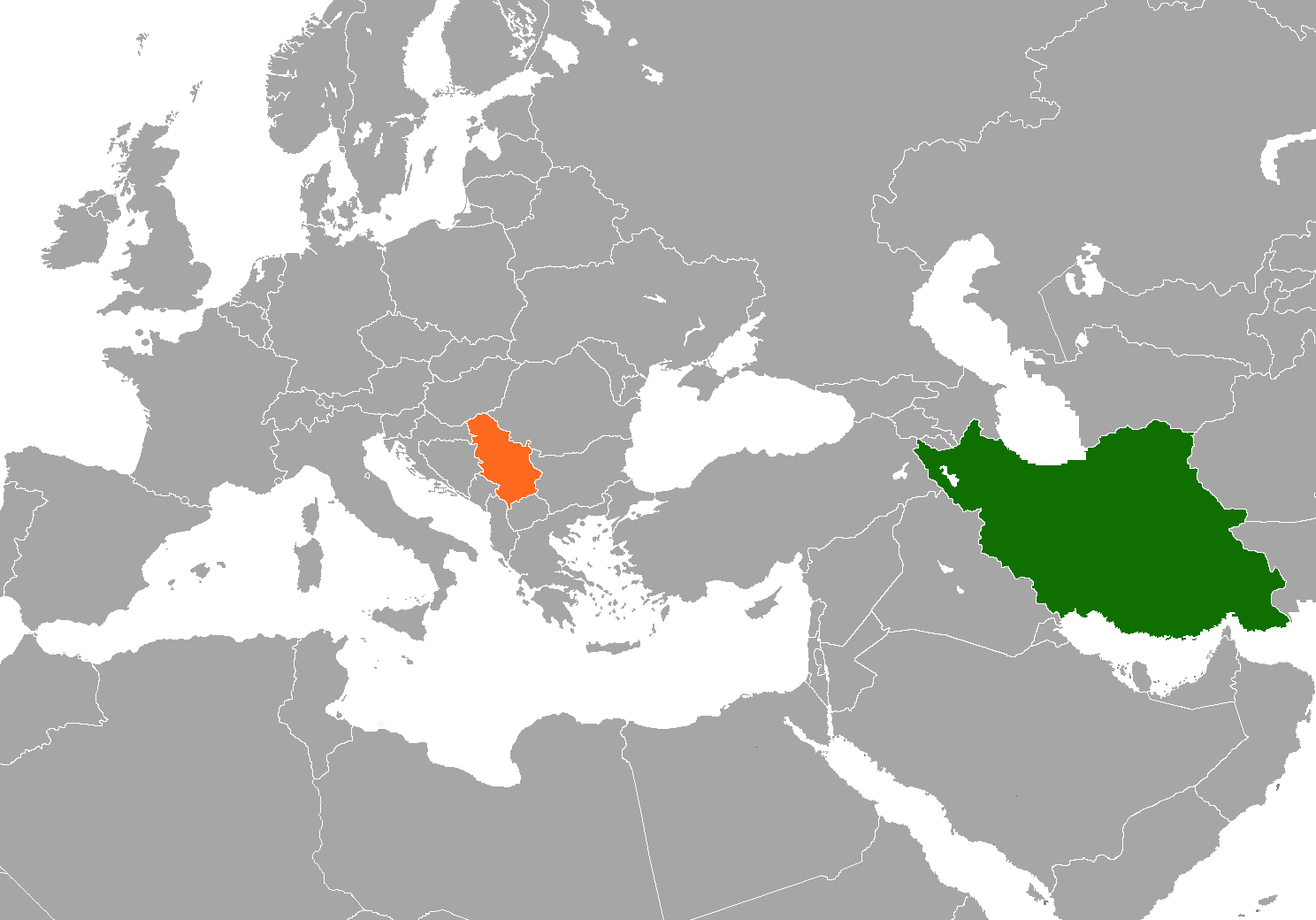

- Iran: Serbia

Diplomatic mission
- Embassy of Iran, Belgrade: Embassy of Serbia, Tehran

Iran and Serbia maintain diplomatic relations established between Iran and Kingdom of Yugoslavia in 1937. From 1937 to 2006, Iran maintained relations with the Kingdom of Yugoslavia, the Socialist Federal Republic of Yugoslavia (SFRY), and the Federal Republic of Yugoslavia (FRY) (later Serbia and Montenegro), of which Serbia is considered shared (SFRY) or sole (FRY) legal successor.

== Relations ==
=== Yugoslav Wars ===
Iran's relations with Serbia (then part of Yugoslavia) were strained during the Yugoslav Wars in which Iran supported the government of the Republic of Bosnia and Herzegovina against opposing rebel Bosnian Serb forces. According to a former Islamic Revolutionary Guard Corps (IRGC) commander, the IRGC sent 400 of its fighters to Bosnia during the war to train Bosnian mujahideen fighters. In addition to training, Iran was given the green light by the Clinton administration to supply the Army of the Republic of Bosnia and Herzegovina with an extensive array of weaponry including assault rifles, ammunition, mortars, anti-tank weapons and SAM's.

Unsubstantiated reports during the Kosovo War stated that Iran sent up to four arms shipments to the KLA.

=== Iran Air's refueling hub in Belgrade ===
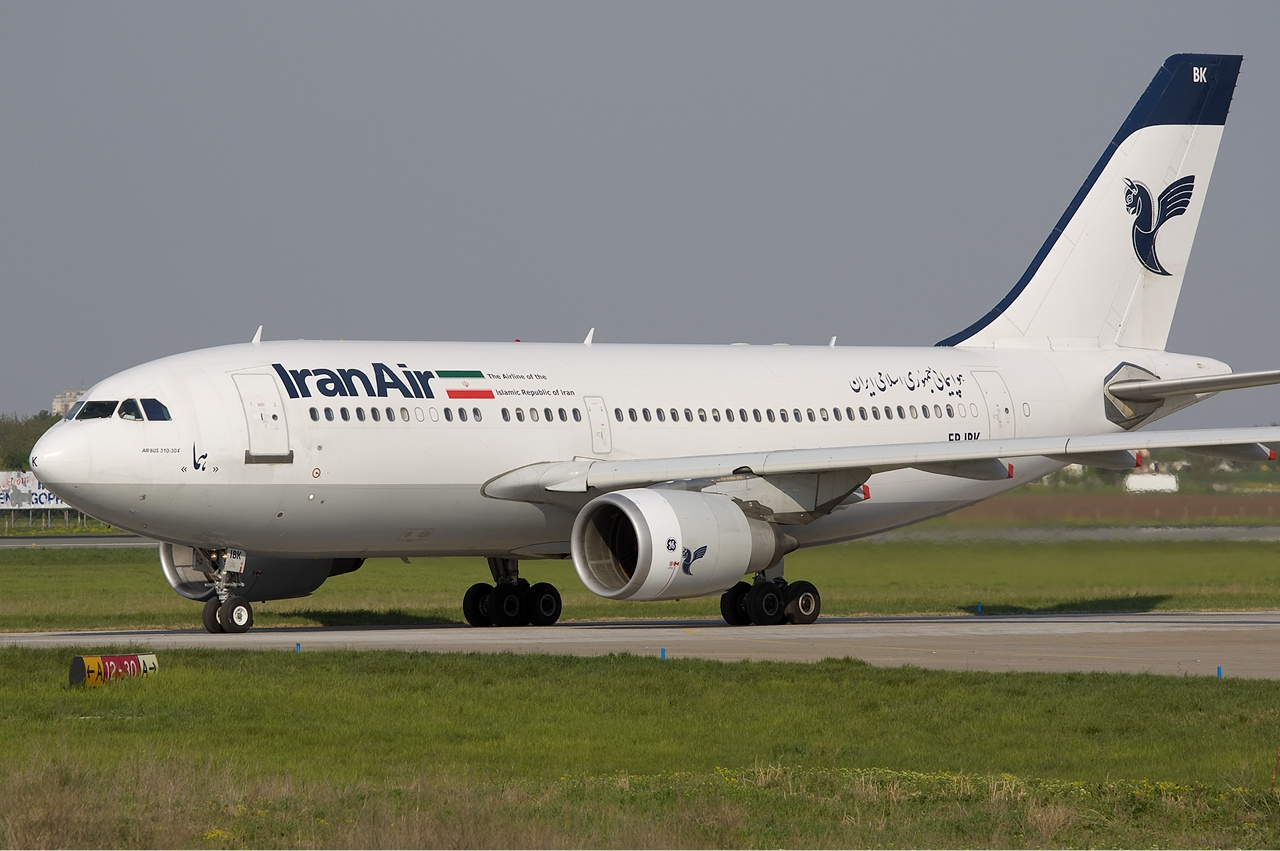
An Iran Air Airbus A310 at Belgrade Nikola Tesla Airport, 2011

In 2011, Iran Air made scheduled landings in Belgrade for fueling aircraft which had been denied kerosene in airports in the European Union. After 18 June 2011, Belgrade Nikola Tesla Airport revoked landing rights for Iran Air, citing pressure from the United States.

=== Non-Aligned Movement ===
The Imperial State of Iran and the Socialist Federal Republic of Yugoslavia were the founding members of the Non-Aligned Movement in 1961.

In 2011, the Deputy Foreign Minister of Iran, Mohammed Akondzadeh, visited Serbia during the annual Non-Aligned Movement council held in Belgrade that year, declared that Iran did not recognize Kosovo as a sovereign nation, and that he hoped friendly relations between Serbia and Iran would progress further. Less than a year later, Ivan Mrkić traveled to Tehran to represent Serbia at the 16th Summit of the Non-Aligned Movement. It was reported on 31 August 2012 that Mrkić addressed the summit participants that Serbia wishes to remain engaged with Non-Aligned Movement member states while devoting to accession to the EU.

=== Conflicting EU interest ===
Serbia put sanctions on Iran as a part of EU accession procedure, according to local media reports from 2012. The announcement of sanctions met very harsh criticism among Serbian media and political writers and reflected a divide between the actions of the Serbian government and the opinions of Serbian citizens. Professor Predrag Simić of the UB Faculty of Political Science said in an interview with S Media that Iran seemed to be tolerant of the Serbian government's accession into the EU, and inferred that it was possible that relations with Iran would not be as damaged as they are with other western nation's despite Serbia's sanctions. In 2013, Serbia's ambassador in Tehran Aleksandar Tasić met with Mahmoud Ahmadinejad; the meeting was cited by Mohammad Reza Rahimi in a note of congratulations to Serbia's state holiday on 15 February, in which it was stated that there are "no impediments" to further relations between Tehran and Belgrade.

=== Visa waiver agreement ===
In 2017, the government of Serbia announced on its website that citizens of the Islamic Republic of Iran as well as those of India can travel to Serbia without applying to obtain visas. This agreement was abolished by the Serbian government over EU pressure in 2018.

Before the agreement was abolished, three Iranian airlines maintained flights between Tehran and Belgrade. After the abolition, only Mahan Air maintains direct scheduled flights between Iran and Serbia.

=== Recent period ===
In 2016, the Serbian President Tomislav Nikolic paid a state visit to Iran, meeting different Islamic Republic officials including President Hassan Rouhani and vice president for science and technology Sorena Sattari. The Serbian president was one of several European heads of state and government who traveled to Iran once international sanctions over Tehran's nuclear program were lifted.

In 2018, after a 27-year hiatus, it was decided that direct flights would resume between the two capitals, namely Tehran and Belgrade. Iran's flag carrier Iran Air offered a direct service between the two capitals twice weekly, and the other Iranian airline Qeshm Air also expressed its interest for flying to Belgrade.

In 2021, Iran reaffirmed their support for Serbia in their dispute with Kosovo.

== Cultural relations ==
There is an Iranian cultural center in Belgrade.

== Resident diplomatic missions ==
- Iran has an embassy in Belgrade.
- Serbia has an embassy in Tehran.

== See also ==
- Foreign relations of Iran
- Foreign relations of Serbia
- Iran–Yugoslavia relations
- Yugoslavia and the Non-Aligned Movement
