= Bosnia and Herzegovina–Iran relations =

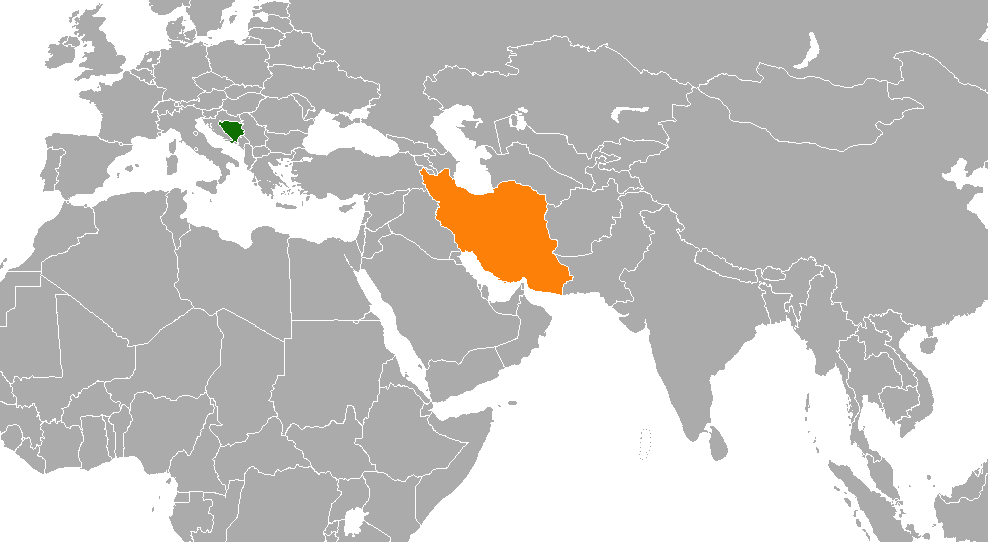

- Bosnia and Herzegovina: Iran

Bosnia and Herzegovina–Iran relations is the historical and bilateral relationship between Bosnia and Herzegovina and Iran. Iran has an embassy in Sarajevo, while Bosnia has an embassy in Tehran.

Iran was one of the main supporters of the Bosnian Muslim side during the Bosnian War (1992–95).

== Bosnian War ==
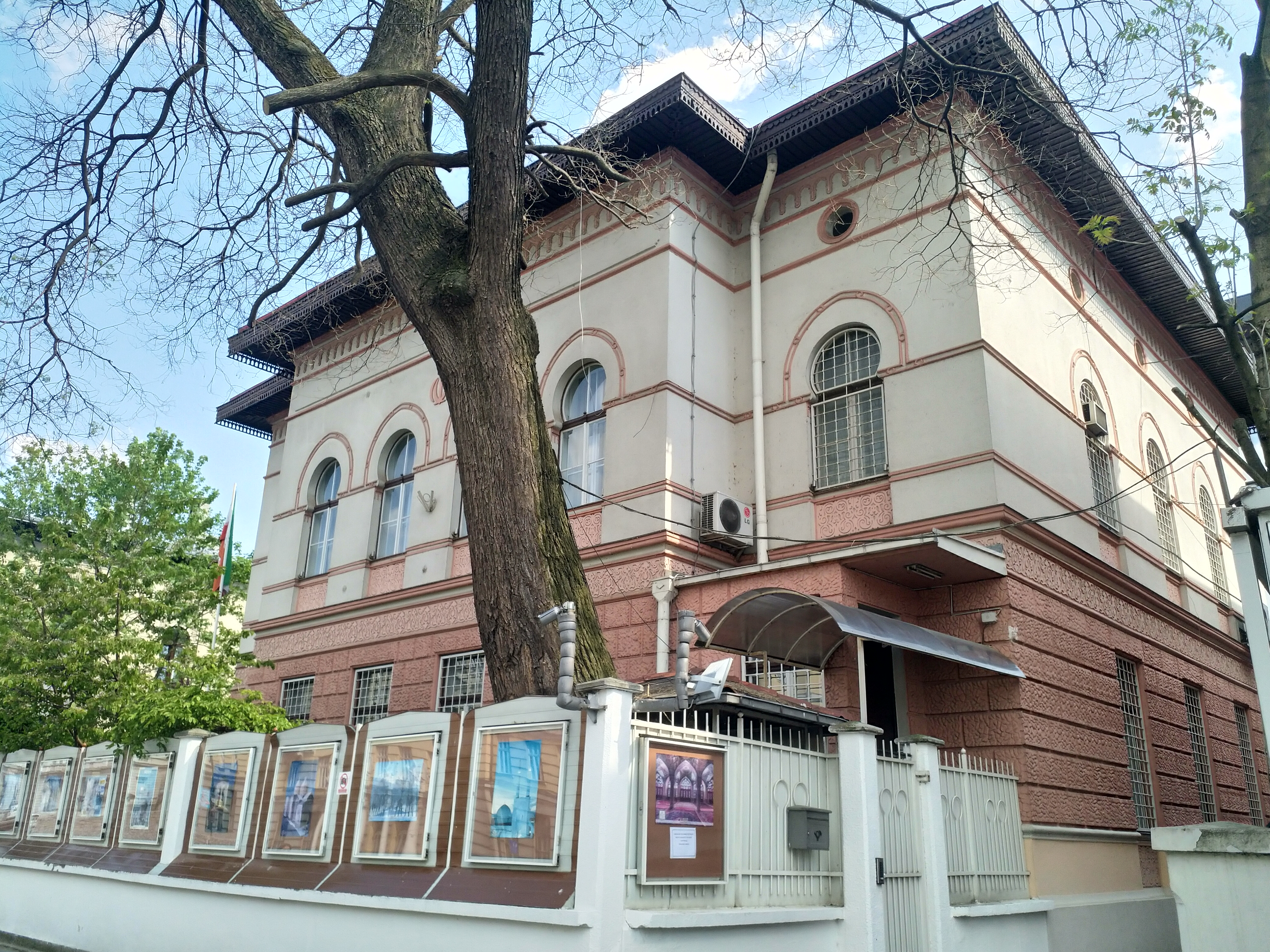
Embassy of Iran in Sarajevo

Iran, a predominantly Shia country, was one of the first Muslim countries to provide support for the Bosnian Muslims (Bosniaks, who are mainly Sunni Muslim) in the war. The Islamic Revolutionary Guard Corps (IRGC) sent more than five thousand tonnes of arms to the Bosnian Muslims. IRGC also supplied trainers and advisers for the Bosnian military and intelligence service. Several dozen Iranian intelligence experts joined the Bosnian Muslim intelligence agency. The Iranian Ministry of Intelligence-supported mujahideen units trained selected Bosnian army units. The Hezbollah (Lebanese Shia), supported by Iran, also sent fighters to the war. In 1992, Iran with the help of Turkey smuggled arms to the Bosnian Muslims. Reports of "hundreds of tons of weapons" shipped from Iran over a period of months appeared in the media in early 1995. Iranian arms were shipped through Croatia.

Robert Baer, a CIA agent stationed in Sarajevo during the war, later claimed that “In Sarajevo, the Bosnian Muslim government is a client of the Iranians . . . If it’s a choice between the CIA and the Iranians, they’ll take the Iranians any day.” By the war's end, public opinion polls showed some 86% of the Bosnian Muslim population expressed a positive attitude toward Iran.

== State visits ==
In October 2016, Bosnian President Bakir Izetbegović travelled to Tehran and met Iranian President Hassan Rouhani. During this visit, the two countries signed a memorandum of understanding to increase bilateral investment in small and medium enterprises.

On 6 December 2022, amid the Mahsa Amini protests, Iran's Foreign Minister Hossein Amir-Abdollahian met with Bosnia and Herzegovina's Foreign Minister Bisera Turković. The meeting with Iran's Foreign Minister was boycotted by the Bosnian Serb and Bosnian Croat representatives, as a protest against Iran. Turković stated that "Iran is our partner and a friend, and the only country that unequivocally supports the territorial integrity and independence of Bosnia and Herzegovina. They supported us in the time of defence and construction of Bosnia and Herzegovina, for which we remain thankful." She added that "little is told about the rights in Afghanistan and Palestine and in the end about human rights in our country". Turković criticised stereotypes in the media and said in the end "imagine me talking to you vailed like this, what would be your perception, stereotype? Human rights include a right of clothes, that everyone should wear what they want and be equally treated".

== Sports ==
Iran become the first country to play a historical football match with Bosnia and Herzegovina in 1993, the match which Iran lost 1–3 at home in Tehran. It was greeted by a congratulation from President Akbar Hashemi Rafsanjani, thus becoming a memory of Bosnia and Herzegovina, as a recognized country in the world.

== Resident diplomatic missions ==
- Bosnia and Herzegovina has an embassy in Tehran.
- Iran has an embassy in Sarajevo.

== See also ==
- Foreign relations of Bosnia and Herzegovina
- Foreign relations of Iran
- Iran–Yugoslavia relations
- Yugoslavia and the Non-Aligned Movement

== Sources ==
- Bennett, Richard (2012). Espionage: Spies and Secrets. Ebury Publishing. pp. 54–. ISBN 978-1-4481-3214-0.
- Burg, Steven L.; Shoup, Paul S. (1999). The War in Bosnia-Herzegovina: Ethnic Conflict and International Intervention. M.E. Sharpe. ISBN 978-1-56324-308-0.
- O'Hern, Steven (2012). Iran's Revolutionary Guard: The Threat That Grows While America Sleeps. Potomac Books, Inc. pp. 82–. ISBN 978-1-59797-701-2.
- Shay, Shaul (2017). Islamic Terror and the Balkans. Taylor & Francis. pp. 94–. ISBN 978-1-351-51138-4.
