= Iranians in Spain =

Total population
- 8,202 / 5,135 (2018) (Note: 8,202 is the size of the population in Spain born in Iran (including those with Spanish citizenship). 5,135 is the size of the foreign population (thus, with no Spanish citizenship) in Spain with Iranian citizenship.)

Languages
- Spanish, Persian (Azerbaijani, Armenian, Kurdish, and other languages of Iran).

Religion
- Shia Islam, Zoroastrianism, Judaism, Atheism

Iranians in Spain have a history going back for over a millennium and form a minor population in modern day. They are a part of the Iranian diaspora.

== Migration history ==
Razi wrote in the 10th century that some Iranians had already settled in Al-Andalus, and Ibn Battuta later claimed the Iranians of Al-Andalus preferred to live in Granada because of its similarity to their homeland. However, the impetus for modern Iranian immigration to Spain came largely from the 1979 Iranian Revolution, as a result of which some Iranians went to Spain as political refugees.

== Demography ==
A 1992 survey found that 31.7% worked in administrative jobs, 18.2% were professionals or technicians, 25.7% worked in trade, and another 11% worked in agriculture. The vast majority were 25–54 years of age, and only one-fifth were women. This is actually a relatively large proportion of women compared to other Muslim migrant communities in Spain, which may be attributed to the fact that most Iranians in Spain are political, rather than economic migrants.

== Notable people ==
- Don Juan of Persia, 17th century notable
- Abdol-Aziz Mirza Farmanfarmaian, Qajar prince
- Soraya Esfandiary-Bakhtiary, former Queen of Iran
- Cihangir Ghaffari, actor and producer
- Ebi (Ebrahim Hamedi), singer

== See also ==
- Iran–Spain relations
- Iranian diaspora
- Immigration to Spain
