= Iran–Yugoslavia relations =

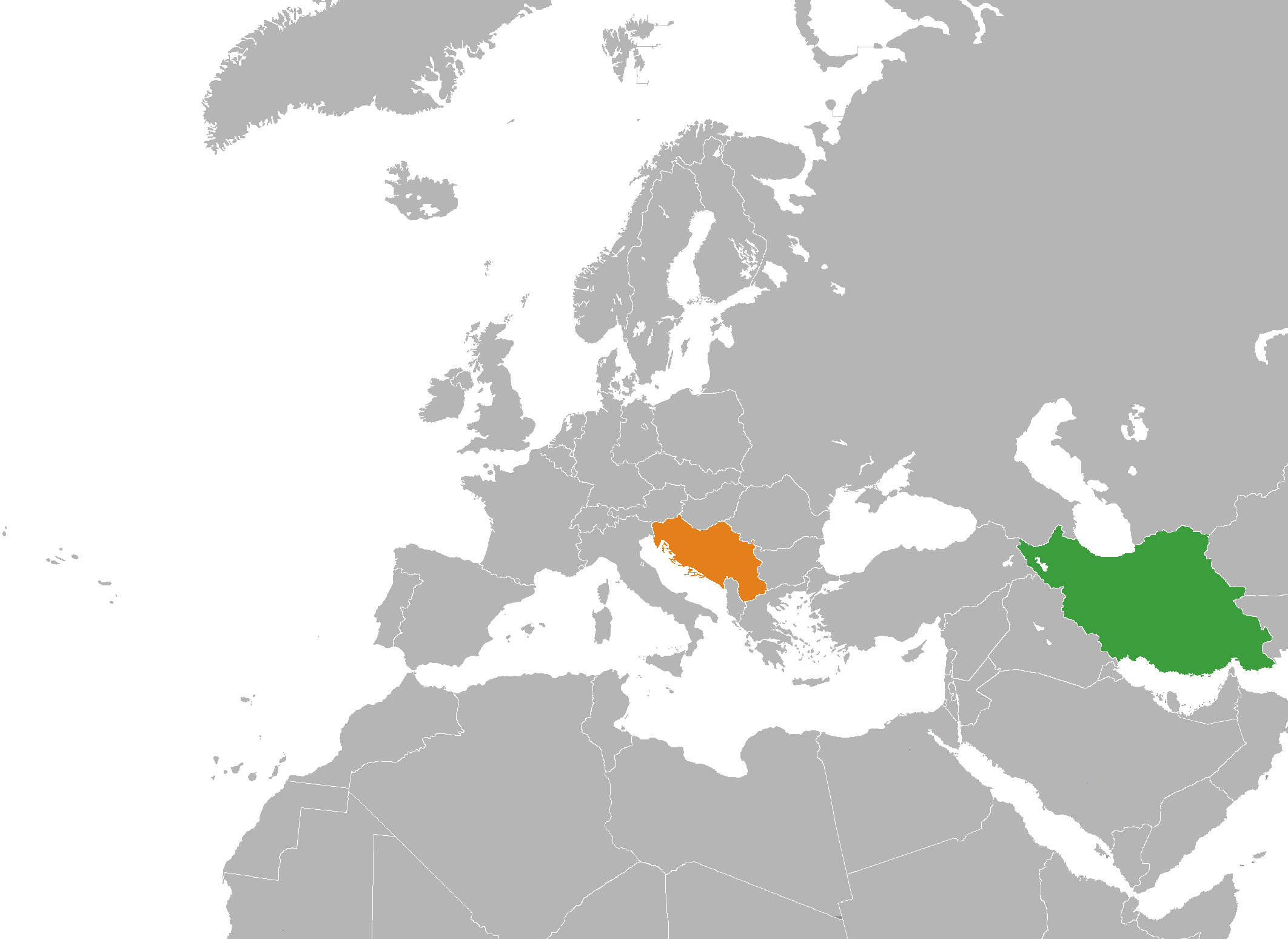

- Iran: Yugoslavia

Iran–Yugoslavia relations were historical foreign relations between Iran (Imperial State of Iran and contemporary post-revolutionary state) and now split-up Socialist Federal Republic of Yugoslavia.

== History ==
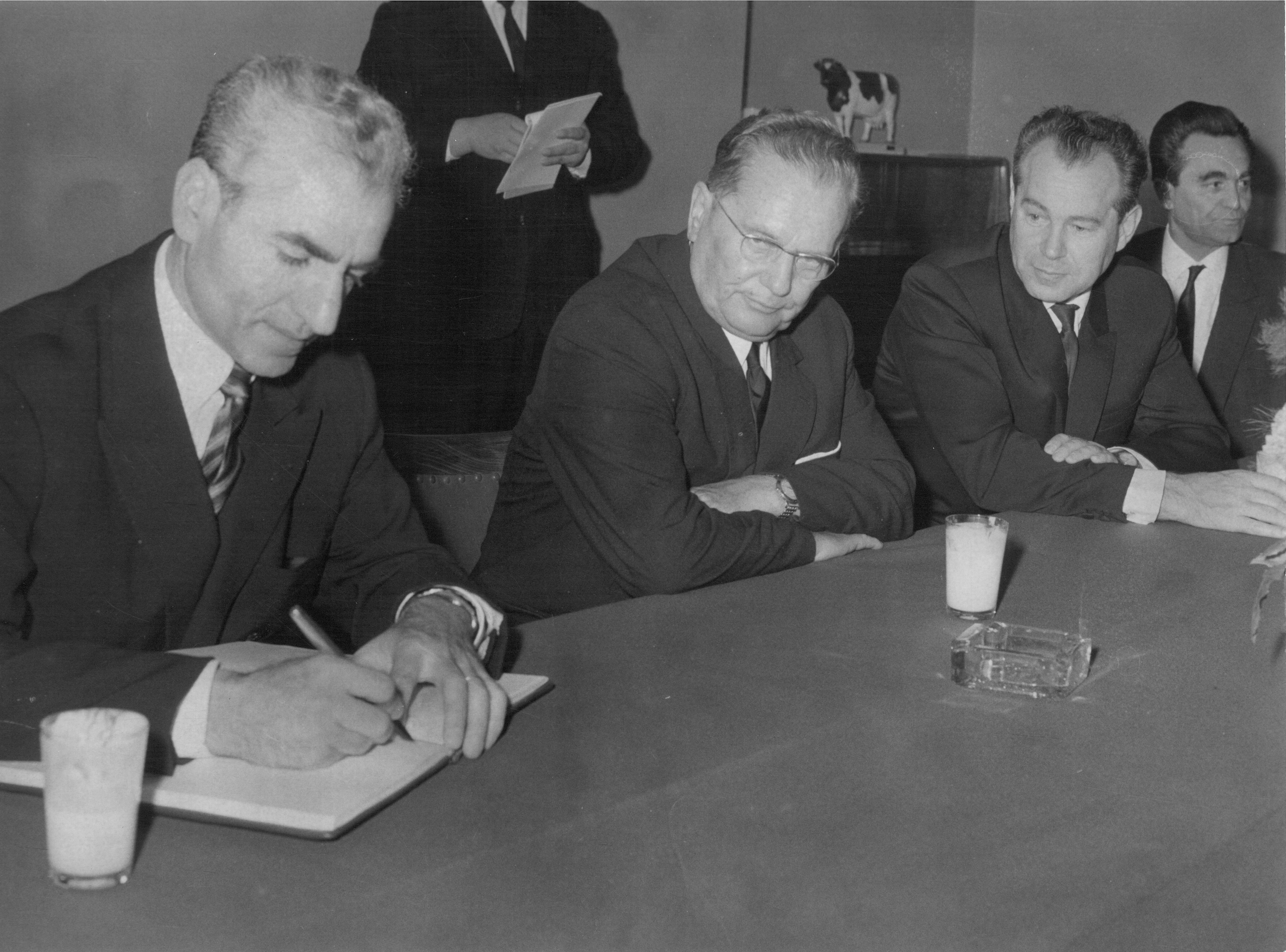
Mohammad Reza Pahlavi in Belgrade (SR Serbia) in 1973.

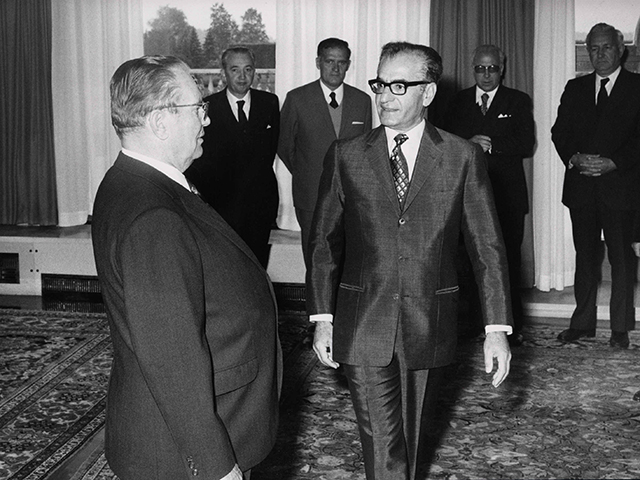
Mohammad Reza Pahlavi at the Brdo Castle near Kranj (SR Slovenia) in 1973.

Historical inter-state relations developed before the establishment of the formal bilateral relations and even before the formation of Yugoslavia. Already in 1882 Shah of Qajar Iran Naser al-Din Shah Qajar sent calligraphic greetings to the newly crowned King of Serbia Milan I of Serbia.

At the time of the Tehran Conference from 28 November to 1 December 1943 The Big Three gave full allied support to Communist-led Yugoslav Partisans while support for nationalist royalist Chetniks was suspended due to their collaborationism. This decision helped ultimate Yugoslav communist victory and led to change of government which transformed Yugoslavia from the kingdom to the federal republic.

Formal diplomatic relations between Iran and Yugoslavia were established in 1945. President of Yugoslavia Josip Broz Tito attended the 2,500-year celebration of the Persian Empire in 1971 which was one of his four visits to the country. Mohammad Reza Pahlavi visited Yugoslavia in 1960 and 1973.

Iran was one of the main Yugoslav trade partners in Asia and reached up to 800 million USD annually, volume which dropped significantly after the breakup of Yugoslavia. Minister of Foreign Affairs of Iran Sadegh Ghotbzadeh attended the state funeral of Josip Broz Tito in 1980. Yugoslav foreign policy, with its prominent role in the Non-Aligned Movement, perceived Iran–Iraq War to be highly delicate issue due to conflicting national and multilateral interests and values. Yugoslav Federal Secretary of Foreign Affairs became unusually silent on the issue as it was clear to Belgrade that Iraq was the aggressor but due to pressure from the Yugoslav People's Army circles was not ready to condemned Saddam Hussein. At the time Iraq was the biggest Yugoslav trade partner in the Third World with around 16,000 Yugoslavs citizens in the country. Ali Khamenei visited Belgrade in February 1989.

== See also ==
- Foreign relations of Iran
- Foreign relations of Yugoslavia
- Yugoslavia and the Non-Aligned Movement
- World War II in Yugoslavia
- Bosnia and Herzegovina–Iran relations
- Croatia–Iran relations
- Iran–Serbia relations
