= Iran–Italy relations =

- Iran: Italy

Diplomatic mission
- Embassy of Italy, Tehran: Embassy of Iran, Rome

Iran and Italy maintain diplomatic relations. Diplomatic ties were formally established between Qajar Iran and the Kingdom of Italy on 18 February 1886. Their relations are one of the oldest documented relationships in world history, stretching back over two thousand years with contacts between the Parthian Empire and the Roman Republic. The two powers often clashed militarily across Armenia and Mesopotamia, but they also traded extensively, influencing each other’s art, luxury goods, and political culture. Roman luxury goods such as glassware and fine metals reached Iran, while Persian silk, textiles, and horses were prized in Rome.

Under the Sasanian and later the Byzantine Empires, this mixture of conflict and exchange continued. The relationship grew even more structured, with both sides recognizing each other as major world powers and maintaining formal diplomatic missions. After the fall of Rome, Italian city-states such as Venice, Genoa, and Florence established commercial ties with Iran. Italian merchants traveled across Iran on the Silk Road, and Persian diplomatic envoys visited Italy. The Renaissance brought a renewed European fascination with Persian culture, literature, and science, often transmitted through Italian scholars who had contact with the East.

By the Safavid era, formal diplomatic relations became more regular. Italy—divided into various states at the time—maintained contacts with the Persian court, particularly through Venice and the Papal States, both of which saw Iran as a counterweight to the Ottoman Empire. Cultural exchange deepened as well, with Persian art influencing Italian collectors and craftsmen.

In the modern era, Italy is one of Iran’s closest European partners in archaeology and cultural studies. Italy-Iran cooperation in the field of archeology dates back to 1959 and has continued since then. Italian archaeologists were among the first Western scholars studying ancient Iranian sites, and even during periods of sanctions or political strain, Italy often acted as a diplomatic bridge between Iran and the West. This long continuity made Iran–Italy relations some of the deepest between Iran and any European country.

== Overview ==
In 2005, Italy was the third largest trading partner of Iran with 7.5% of all exports to Iran. Italy was Iran's largest trading partner in the European Union in 2017.

Italy has maintained active diplomatic channels with Tehran even in periods of heightened tensions between the European Union and the Islamic Republic of Iran. Despite the severity of international sanctions that substantially reduced prospects of trade with Iran, Italian officials retained communication with Iranian counterparts on soft political issues, albeit just at low-level exchanges during the presidency of Mahmoud Ahmadinejad.

After the interim nuclear deal was agreed in 2013, Italy's Emma Bonino became the first European foreign minister to visit Tehran since the tenure of President Mohammad Khatami. In both her capacity as Italian Minister of Foreign Affairs and later as High Representative of the Union for Foreign Affairs and Security Policy, Federica Mogherini strongly backed the nuclear negotiations. She also reiterated that a breakthrough in the talks could lead to a new chapter for Iran and the West going beyond non-proliferation issues.

In 2015, during an interview with Italian broadcaster RAI, President Hassan Rouhani said that Italy was the first trade partner among European Union states for several years before the international sanctions and that Iran regards Italy as the most important country for trade and economic cooperation.

In 2026, during the 2026 Iran conflict, Italy sent air defence aid to the Gulf countries, attacked by Iran. in her statement on why Italy is sending aid to the region, Meloni said: "This ‌is not only because they are friendly nations, but above all because tens of thousands of Italians live in the region and around 2,000 Italian troops are deployed there – people we want to, and must, protect,".

== Historical relations ==
=== Antiquity ===
The relations between Iran and Italy have ancient origins. The relationship between the two countries dates back to when the Parthian Empire and the Roman Empire shared borders in the Eastern Mediterranean.

=== Medieval era ===
Since the 12th century to the Pahlavi era, a small percent of Italian traders, workers, and Catholics settled in Iran. Cities such as Venice and Genoa were major trading powers, and their merchants sought valuable goods from the East, such as silk, spices, precious stones, and carpets. Persia, strategically located along the Silk Road, became an important destination for Italian merchants, with cities such as Tabriz serving as key trading hubs. Italian traders established trading posts in Tabriz and other Persian cities, conducting business with local merchants and travelers from across Asia and the Middle East.

While some Italian traders traveled back and forth between Europe and Persia, others settled more permanently, engaging with local communities and marrying into Persian families. Italian merchants brought European goods, art, and ideas to Persia, while taking back luxury items such as Persian silk, carpets, and spices to European markets, enhancing trade relations between the two regions. Over time, the influence of Italian traders in Persia declined with the rise of other European powers such as the Portuguese, Dutch, and British, who developed direct sea routes to the East, diminishing the importance of the overland routes through Persia.

=== Early Modern era ===
After the unification of Italy in 1861, they signed a friendship agreement and a commercial treaty in 1873. During the Second World War, the alliance was interrupted momentarily, but it was picked up again at the end of the conflict. Moreover, part of the Iranian intellectual elite of the late 19th century, who were modernist and open to the western world, found refuge in Italy during the political turmoil of the 20th century until the constitutional revolution of 1906.

=== Modernity ===
A friendship agreement between Iran and Italy was signed by the Iranian Foreign Minister Mohsen Rais and Italy's ambassador to Iran, Alberto Rossi Longhi, in Tehran on 24 September 1950.

In 1977 the President of the Republic, Giovanni Leone made a state trip to Tehran, as the head of a high-level political and economic delegation to normalize the relations between the states, especially in the economic sphere. After the Iranian Revolution in 1979, Italian public opinion, led by the leftist parties sustained Iran. Meanwhile, the Italian government was aligned with the American position in favour of economic sanctions against Iran. During the Iran–Iraq War, when Iraq, led by Saddam Hussein, fought against Iran, Italy declared its neutrality.

Following the war and the election of Mohammad Khatami as president of the Islamic republic, relations improved. In 1999 Khatami visited Rome to meet with the Italian government, and he remarked on the start of a new phase of reconstruction, in which Italian energy companies tried to carve out a role in projects concerning infrastructures, energy, and technology. In the years of Mahamoud Ahmadinejad's presidency, who belonged to the conservative sphere, diplomatic relations improved because Iran regarded Italy as one of its major western allies.

Enrico Mattei, the founder of ENI, concluded a favourable agreement in 1957 for the Iranian government, pulling ENI away from the Seven Sisters' influence. Mattei took advantage of the Suez crisis and contacted the Shah of Persia, Mohammad Reza Pahlavi. He proposed an agreement that marked a structural innovation in the world of oil companies. The deal included a company that was 50% owned by the Iranian state. What remained would be divided between Eni and NIOC, granting Iran a total share of 75%. On 14 March 1957 a deal between Eni and NIOC was signed and in the same year, on 8 September the SIRIP, Società Irano-Italienne des Pétroles, was born. The agreement failed and Mattei died in 1962 in an aeroplane crash.

Italy was the first commercial partner of Iran from 2006 to 2012. In those same years, since Iran decided to keep pursuing its plan to develop and use nuclear energy, the US and the EU imposed economic and financial sanctions on some key sectors for Iran. Those penalties weighed on its trade with Italy. In 2013 Hassan Rouhani, the seventh President of the Islamic Republic of Iran considered Italy as the door to establish the relations with the rest of the EU. Until the sanctions imposed by the Security Council on Iran for the enrichment of depleted uranium, Iranian oil reserves covered 90% of Italy's oil needs. The embargo was revoked only in January 2014, followed by an Interim Deal between UE+3 and Iran, established in 2013. The following year, after the conclusion of the deal on nuclear energy oil, an Italian delegation guided by Carlo Calenda, consisting in Confindustria's leaders and CEI that represented 180 small-medium companies and 12 banks, arrived in Iran. The goal was to prepare the state for the removal of penalties imposed in 2006 for the nuclear program.

After the entry into force of the JCPOA in 2015 and the interruption of the sanctions, Rouhani chose Italy for his first state trip. On this occasion, the memorandum of understanding for a total of twenty billion euros was signed. Among the most important groups involved there were Pessina, Saipem, Danieli, Fincantieri, Gavio Group, COET, Vitali, SEA, Enel, Belleli, Stefano Boeri Architetti, Itway, Italtel, Marcegaglia, Fata Spa, IMQ, and so on.

Many agreements never materialized, due to the primary sanctions imposed by the US, but also secondary sanctions not related to the nuclear problem. Large banking groups, due to their links with the US market, could not make transactions to the Iran market. They risked incurring US Treasury sanctions. Part of this problem was addressed in January 2018 by the Ministry of Economic Development with the proposal of a Master Credit Agreement. It intended to regulate any future financing agreement concluded between Invitalia Global Investment and Iranian banks for a total amount of five billion euros and was covered by a sovereign guarantee issued by the Iranian state. The agreement, however, is still waiting for the transformation into a decree-law to become effective.

Towards the end of 2024 the relations were significantly impacted following the arrest of Mohammad Abedini Najafabadi, a Swiss-Iranian businessman, arrested in Milan on 16 December 2024, at the request of the United States. In response, Iran arrested 29-year-old Italian journalist Cecilia Sala in Tehran on 19 December, allegedly for the "violation of the Islamic Republic's laws". The escalation caused the Italian Foreign Ministry to issue a verbal note to the Iranian government, demanding "total guarantees" regarding the detention conditions of Sala and her immediate release. Italian officials, including Prime Minister Giorgia Meloni and Foreign Minister Antonio Tajani, are actively engaged in efforts to resolve the situation. Italy's Foreign Ministry summoned the Iranian Ambassador to demand Sala's immediate release in January 2025. On 8 January 2025, Italian Prime Minister Giorgia Meloni announced that Sala had been released from prison by Iran. Mohammed Abedini remains in custody in Milan.

== Economic relations ==
Italy has been and is significantly present in Iran's foreign relations. Although the economic and commercial relations between the two countries have experienced ups and downs over time, Italy has ranked at the top in Europe in terms of volume of trade with the Islamic Republic of Iran. In 2010, the volume of trade relations between the two countries exceeded seven billion euros. In 2015 with the imposition of severe sanctions on Iran, the volume of trade fell to less than two billion euros. With the signing of the Nuclear Agreement and subsequently the exchange of visits by the President of the Islamic Republic of Iran and the then Prime Minister of Italy to Rome and Tehran respectively, agreements and MoUs for a value of 30 billion euro were signed for economic and commercial collaborations between the two countries, as well as the opening of a credit line (MCA) which had laid the foundations for an important leap forward in bilateral relations.

Economic relations between the two countries have had an evolution after the signing of the nuclear agreement. Economic operators and political parties in both countries, through a precise understanding of mutual national interests, have been able to create the conditions for the development of relations. Therefore, the significant decrease in the volume of economic relations between the two countries in 2021 is mainly due to external factors and in the last year in particular with two main elements: the US threats against Iran's economic partners in Italy and the coronavirus epidemic.

== Cultural relations ==
In accordance with a Treaty on cultural cooperation between Italy and Iran from 1958, and the following Executive Protocols, the Embassy of Italy in Iran enhances bilateral cultural relations in the fields of the development and spread of the Italian language, musical, artistic, theatrical, cinematographic and scientific heritage. The Treaty was signed by Amintore Fanfani, President of the Council and Minister of Foreign Affairs, and His Majesty The Shahanshah of Iran. The Treaty was at the basis of the following treaties between the two countries.

Following the Treaty of 1958 between 1978 and 1979 a Cultural exchange program was developed between the Italian republic government and the imperial government of Iran. A cultural exchange program for the years 1996–1999 also made it possible to further develop exchanges in the field of culture and education and thus contribute to the friendship between the two countries.

Important is the Memorandum of Understanding between the two countries signed by the Minister of Industry, Trade and Crafts with the task of Tourism Pierluigi Bersani and the Minister of Culture and Islamic Orientation Ataollah Mahajerani on 10 November 1999.

In 2000, a further Executive program of cultural collaboration was signed for the years 2000–2004 on the basis of which the two countries committed to cooperate in the university field and language teaching (thanks to the stipulation of agreements and conventions between the individual universities and the exchange of educational and scientific activities), in the cultural and art field (music, theater, cinema, festivals, cultural events), cultural heritage, scientific cooperation, in the radio and television and information field, sport and tourism.

The movie "Soraya", directed by Lodovico Gasparini, was released in 2003, depicting the story of Soraya Esfandiary-Bakhtiary. Anna Valle played the leading role of the Persian Princess who was forced to divorce from the Shah of Iran after failing to give him an heir to the Sun Throne. The film was released in Italy on Rai Uno.

In 2004, Italian experts were working on plans to expand the National Museum of Iran beyond its current capacity, from 2,200 to 6,000.

On the occasion of the 11th Week of the Italian Language in the World, the Italian School of Tehran organized a series of events, created with the collaboration of Iranian universities that offer Italian language courses. The Week was inaugurated on Sunday 16 October 2011 with a study day dedicated to Eugenio Montale. Subsequently, some Italian films were also proposed (Il Postino, Pane e Tulipani, Benvenuti al Sud).

A further program, Executive Collaboration Program in the fields of culture, education, higher education and research, was signed in 2015 between the Ambassador of the Islamic Republic of Iran in Italy, Jahanbakhsh Mozaffari, and the Director General for the Promotion of the Country System of the Minister of Foreign Affairs and International Cooperation and Ambassador Andrea Meloni.

In November 2019, the exhibition entitled "Italy and Iran, 60 years of collaboration on cultural heritage" was inaugurated at the National Museum of Iran. The exhibition tells the 60 years of the Italian archaeological presence in Iran and the bilateral collaboration in the field of preservation and enhancement of the Iranian cultural heritage.

In December of the same year, the first phase of the "Italy-Iran cooperation project for the development of cultural heritage, tourism and handicrafts" began. The project involves the promotion and exchange of Italian and Iranian knowledge and skills in the field of management and development of the historical, artistic and cultural heritage.

== Resident diplomatic missions ==
- Iran has an embassy in Rome and a consulate-general in Milan.
- Italy has an embassy in Tehran.

== See also ==
- Foreign relations of Iran
- Foreign relations of Italy
- Iran-EU relations
- Roman–Persian relations
- Roman–Parthian Wars
