= Orobazus =

Orobazus was the ambassador of the Parthian king Mithridates II who contacted the Roman magistrate Lucius Cornelius Sulla. This was the first meeting between a Parthian and a Roman official. The results of this meeting are not clear, but it is generally known that during the meeting Sulla was sitting between the Parthian ambassador and Ariobarzanes I of Cappadocia the king of Cappadocia. The center was considered the seat of honor, and for this the Parthian king put Orobazus to death for allowing a Roman magistrate to treat a Parthian envoy arrogantly.

== Sources ==
- Dignas, Beate; Winter, Engelbert (2007). Rome and Persia in Late Antiquity: Neighbours and Rivals. Cambridge University Press. ISBN 978-0-521-84925-8.
