= Iran–Netherlands relations =

- Iran: Netherlands

Diplomatic relations between the Netherlands and Iran (Persia) have existed since the 17th century. However, the relationship changed significantly after the Iranian Revolution.

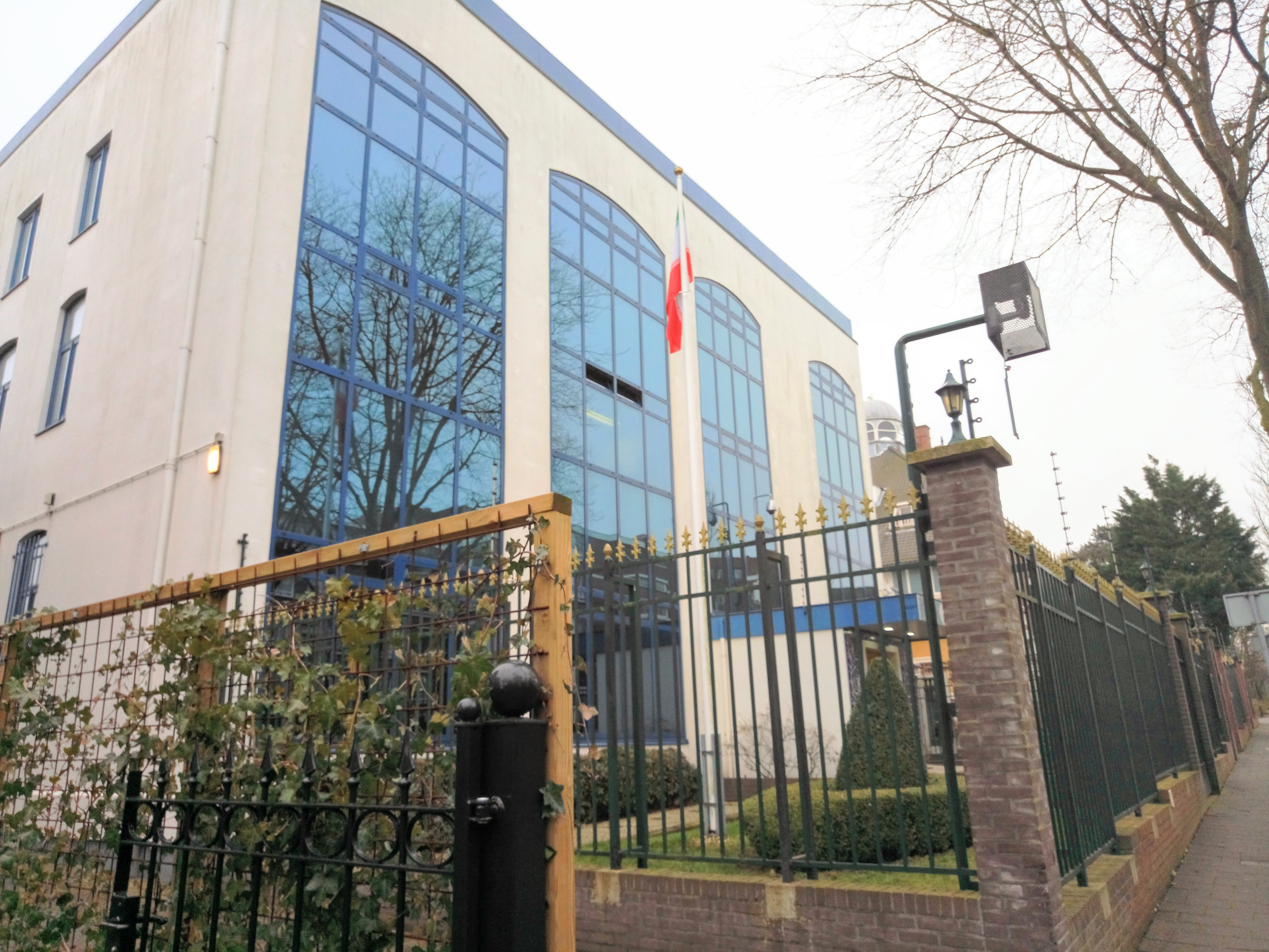
Embassy of Iran in The Hague

== Development ==
=== Beginning the relation in 17th century ===
Political relations between Persia and the Netherlands started under Shah Abbas I. In 1626, the first Persian ambassador to Holland, Mousa Beig (Persian: موسی بیگ) presented his credentials at the States-General of the Netherlands. The Dutch ambassador Jan Smidt went to Isfahan and met with Shah Safi in 1629.

=== 20th century ===
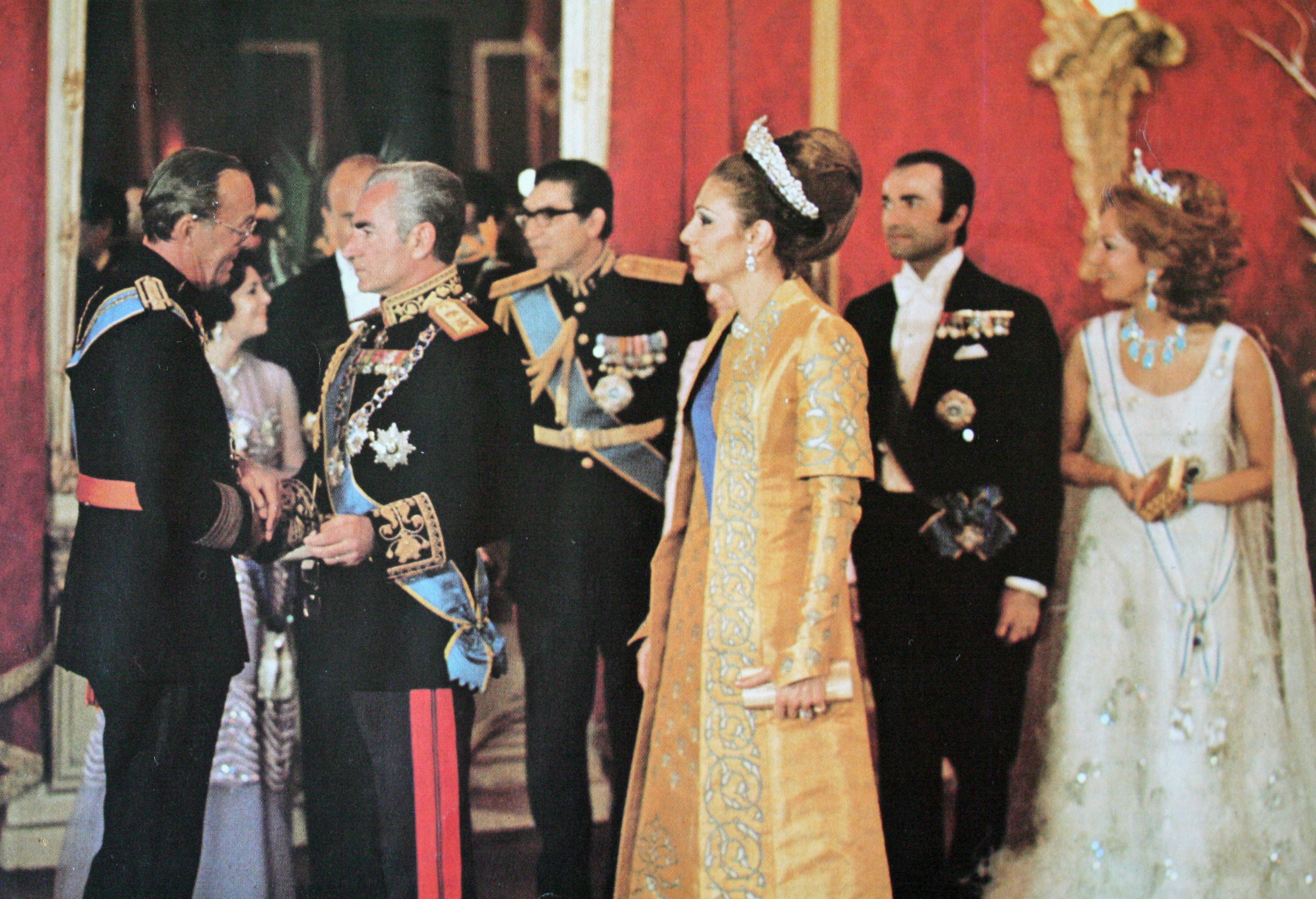
Prince Bernhard of the Netherlands together with Shah Mohammad Reza Pahlavi and Queen Farah of Iran. Tehran, 1970s

In the 1960s and 1970s, the Persian and Dutch royal families made various state visits to each other's countries.

=== Relations with the Islamic Republic ===
The Netherlands has condemned Iran over its nuclear program.

In 2011, the Dutch Foreign Minister announced the suspension of official relations between the Netherlands and Iran, after the Dutch-Iranian Zahra Bahrami was executed in Iran.

On June 7, 2018, the Netherlands expelled two Iranian diplomats accredited to the Iranian embassy. In response, Iran summoned the Dutch ambassador in July 2018.

In January 2019, the government of the Netherlands accused Iran of having arranged the assassinations of two Dutch nationals of Iranian origin: Mohammad-Reza Kolahi in 2015, and Ahmad Molla Nissi in 2017. The incident caused outcry both in the Netherlands and internationally; EU responded with sanctions against Iranian intelligence. Iranian officials in turn accused the Netherlands of supporting the People's Mujahedin of Iran with its members in western Europe, who Mohammad-Reza Kolahi is believed to be a part of.

In January 2024, the Dutch government summoned the Iranian ambassador to the Netherlands following the death of a Dutch baby in an attack by Iran on Erbil.

On January 28 2026, the Iranian authorities searched the diplomatic baggage of a Dutch diplomat at the airport in Tehran in contravention of their obligations under the Vienna convention on diplomatic relations. The Iranian authorities stated that they seized Starlink ground stations and other satellite phones, which are illegal in Iran, from the baggage. On February 24 2026, after Iranian media published surveillance video of the incident, the government of The Netherlands summoned the Iranian ambassador to the Netherlands. A day later on February 25, the Iranian government summoned the Dutch ambassador in response. On e of the defendants, Mehrez A., told the court that he had traveled to the Netherlands to carry out the killing. On 12 November, the prosecutor sought sentences of up to 20 years and judgement expected 21 December.

== Trade ==
The Netherlands was formerly one of Iran's leading trade partners in Europe. At least 65 Dutch companies have economic ties with the Islamic Republic. In spite of economic sanctions imposed by the United States and the European Union, Shell, a UK-registered Anglo-Dutch oil company continues to buy billions in crude oil from Iran each year. The investigation known as "Operation Murene" was conducted by the Dutch Intelligence service and the Public Prosecution Service.

== Political-economic conflicts ==
In 1974, Iranian students occupied the Iran Embassy in Wassenaar, out of protest against suppression and executions in Iran. Considering the 100 guilder fine too low a punishment for the students, the Iranian government suspended all imports from the Netherlands for a while.

In 2008, Alaeddin Boroujerdi, head of Iran's Majlis National Security and Foreign Policy Commission, warned the Netherlands not to air Geert Wilders' anti-Muslim film Fitna.

Iran has criticized the Netherlands for funding Radio Zamaneh. During the 2009 public unrest and demonstrations in Iran, Majid Ghahremani, Iranian ambassador to the Netherlands, accused the Dutch government of interfering in Iran's internal affairs. A Dutch foreign ministry spokeswoman said subsidies to the radio station would be continued, with the aim of improving the situation of human rights in Iran.

== Cultural relations ==
In 2011, Iran established a series of cultural exhibits showing pictures featuring Iran's historical monuments and tourist attractions.

== Resident diplomatic missions ==
- Iran has an embassy in The Hague.
- the Netherlands has an embassy in Tehran.

== Notes ==
- The Dutch embassy in Iran is temporarily accredited at the embassy in Baku, Azerbaijan from March to June 2026.

== See also ==
- Foreign relations of Iran
- Foreign relations of the Netherlands
- Iranians in the Netherlands
- Anti-Iranian sentiment in the Netherlands
- 2024 Iranian operations inside Australia

== Literature ==
- Herbert, Thomas. Travels in Persia 1627-1629. Edited by Sir Williams Foster, London, 1928.
- Perzië Blokkeert Import Uit Ons Land. Nieuwsblad van het Noorden, 19-04-1974.
- Meilink, M. A. P. The earliest Relations between Persia and the Netherlands. "Persica" (Annual of the Dutch-Iranian Society), Vol. 6, 1974.
- Hotz, A. Journaal der reis van den gezant der O. I Compagnie, Joan Cunaeus naar Perzië in 1651-1652 door Cornelis Speelman. Hist. Gen., Utrecht, Amsterdam, 1980.
