= Greece–Iran relations =

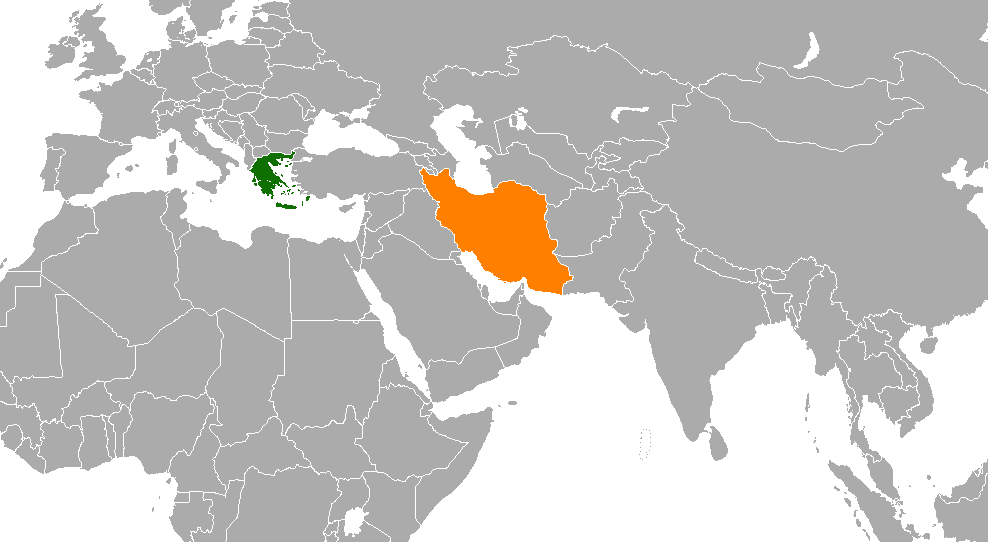

- Greece: Iran

Diplomatic mission
- Embassy of Greece, Tehran: Embassy of Iran, Athens

Greece–Iran relations were formally established between the Kingdom of Greece and Qajar Iran on 19 November 1902. Greece and Iran share one of the oldest documented relationships in world history, beginning in the Achaemenid Empire when the Persians encountered the Greeks.

Their early interactions mostly included conflict—such as the Greco-Persian Wars—but also cooperation, with Persian involvement in Greek political affairs and Greek mercenaries serving in Persian armies. After Alexander's conquest of the Achaemenid Empire, Greek and Iranian cultures fused across a vast region, producing the Hellenistic world, where Greek art, language, and philosophy blended with Iranian traditions in cities like Seleucia, Taxila, and Ai-Khanoum. Under the Parthian and Sassanid Empires, Greeks lived throughout Iran as soldiers, traders, and craftsmen, while intellectual exchange persisted in philosophy, astronomy, and medicine.

In the modern era, the two countries have had political spats and escalations on numerous occasions. Out of all European countries, Greece has had the highest level of hostilities with Iran, and it was also one of the few countries to support the assassination of Qasem Soleimani by the United States in 2020. In response, the Iranian government threatened Greece with retaliation if it allowed the American military to use Greek territory as a staging ground against Iran.

Modern Greece has been consistently among the most anti-Iranian countries in the world. In 2019, Greece expressed the highest level of support among European countries for the US canceling of JCPOA. Greece has often supported cultural cooperation with Iran, hosting exhibitions and archaeological collaborations that highlight the deep historical connection between the Hellenic and Iranian worlds.

On December 12, 2025, the Iranian Minister of Culture traveled to Athens and met with senior Greek cultural officials. Both sides announced the strengthening of cooperation in the fields of tourism, cultural heritage, and handicrafts. The Greek government officially declared its readiness to cooperate with Iran, and several agreements were reached on holding exhibitions as well as organizing visits by influencers from both countries, aimed at promoting each other’s tourist attractions.

== History ==
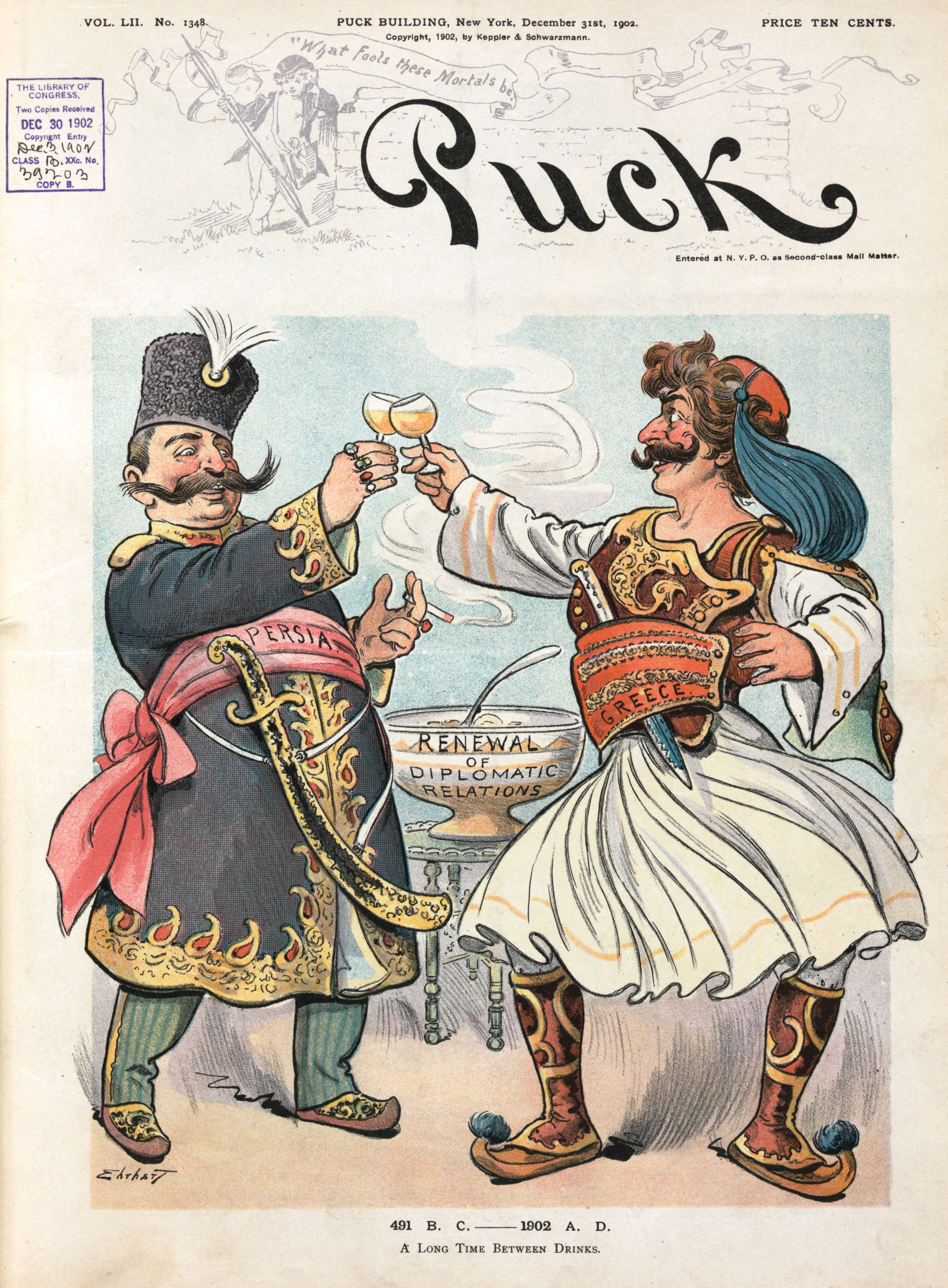
A cartoon by Puck commemorating the formal establishment of diplomatic relations between the Kingdom of Greece and the Sublime State of Iran in November 1902. It depicts a Greek and a Persian sharing a drink for the first time in 2393 years (since 491 BC), notwithstanding sustained Greek–Persian cultural interactions thereafter.

=== Ancient ===
Relations between the two sides date back from antiquity and well before the first Persian invasion of Greece. By the late 6th century BC, the Achaemenid Empire was in control of the entirety of Asia Minor (which included many ethnically Greek areas), as well as many of the Greek islands, Thrace, and Macedonia, the latter two of which make up large parts of modern-day northern Greece. There is also the report by the Greek geographer Strabo of a delegation being sent from Athens to the Achaemenid Empire in 432 BC.

While both sides were sworn rivals during the Greco-Persian Wars, they eventually developed a strong cordiality with each other, especially after the Wars of Alexander the Great. Alexander admired Persian culture and Cyrus the Great, and wanted to create a synthesis with Greek culture that would forever bind and commemorate the Greek people and the Persian people. To this end, he even arranged the Susa weddings in the hopes that having a Persian wife would prove the legitimacy of his identification as a son of both ancient Greece and ancient Persia.

This legacy of strong cordiality would thus be found back for many more centuries in various parts of the world—a harmonious blend of both Greek and Persian cultural aspects. The Kingdom of Pontus was a prime example of an entity (in Asia Minor) where Persian and Greek culture, ethnicity, language, and identity mingled.

Warfare continued between Greece and Persia in the 3rd century BC, with the Parthian dynasty reconquering the Persian mainland and also capturing Seleucia, the capital of the Seleucid Empire, thereby turning the once-great successor of Alexander's empire into a rump state.

=== Medieval ===
As the Roman Empire began to fracture along the lines of the Greek East and Latin West, and ultimately following the fall of the Western Roman Empire, the main powers in the Near East were the Greek-dominated Eastern Roman Empire (or Byzantine Empire) and the Persian Sasanian Empire. The Roman–Persian Wars, which had started between the Roman Republic and the Parthian Empire, continued intermittently between the Byzantines and the Sasanians. They were ultimately inconclusive, however, and came to an abrupt end with the rise of Islam in the Arabian Peninsula in the 7th century, as the Sasanian Empire fell to the Arab conquest of Persia and the Byzantine Empire lost a vast swath of territory to the Arab conquest of the Levant. While the Zoroastrian Sasanian Empire was annexed by the Rashidun Caliphate and subsequently Islamized, the Christian Byzantine Empire remained intact at Constantinople and in parts of Asia Minor. For the next two centuries, the Arabs maintained direct control over Iran, effectively severing contact between the Greeks and the Iranians. By the time the Iranian Intermezzo ended Arab rule in Iran, the Byzantine Empire had begun declining and later collapsed, owing to the Crusades and then to the Mongol conquests, by which Turkic tribes entered Asia Minor, eventually leading to the establishment of the Ottoman Empire and the fall of Constantinople in 1453.

=== Modern ===
There is a small Christian Greek community in Iran. In Tehran, there is a Greek Orthodox church, which opens mostly during the Greek Holy Week.

On May 24, 2012, the Iran-Greece Chamber of Commerce was founded to strengthen economic ties between Iran and Greece across various sectors such as industry, commerce, mining, agriculture, and services. Additionally, the Chamber seeks to promote bilateral exchanges and investments between the two countries. Mehdi Jahangiri is the chairman of the board of the Iran-Greece Chamber of Commerce.

In February 2016, the then Greek Prime Minister Alexis Tsipras traveled to Tehran, becoming the first Western leader to visit Iran after the Joint Comprehensive Plan of Action was signed. Tsipras met the Iranian President Hassan Rouhani and pledged that his country would become an energy, economic and trade bridge between Iran and the European Union.

In January 2020, the Greek PM Kyriakos Mitsotakis stated that "Greece supports the decision of the USA for the assassination of Qasem Soleimani" causing an official protest by Iran, while the Greek opposition condemned the killing of Soleimani.

During the COVID-19 pandemic, Greece donated 200,000 vaccines to Iran.

In May 2022, Iranian soldiers seized two Greek tankers and took the crew hostage at the Persian Gulf. This move was a punitive action after Greek authorities confiscated Iranian oil held on a Russian-operated ship docked at a port in Greece a month earlier due to European Union sanctions against Russia for the Russian invasion of Ukraine.

On June 8, 2022, a Greek court overruled an earlier court order that authorized the United States to seize part of an Iranian oil cargo aboard an Iranian-flagged tanker off the Greek coast.

On June 14, 2022, the Iranian-flagged Lana tanker ship, which was held by Greece in April, has been released and its oil cargo will be returned to its owner, according to Iran's Ports and Maritime Organization (PMO).

On July 2, 2022, an Iranian-flagged tanker that Greece seized in April, with the United States seizing some of its cargo, was being towed to the port of Piraeus.

== Resident diplomatic missions ==
- Greece has an embassy in Tehran.
- Iran has an embassy in Athens.

== See also ==
- Iran–European Union relations
- Foreign relations of Greece
- Foreign relations of Iran
- Iranians in Greece
