= Iran–Spain relations =

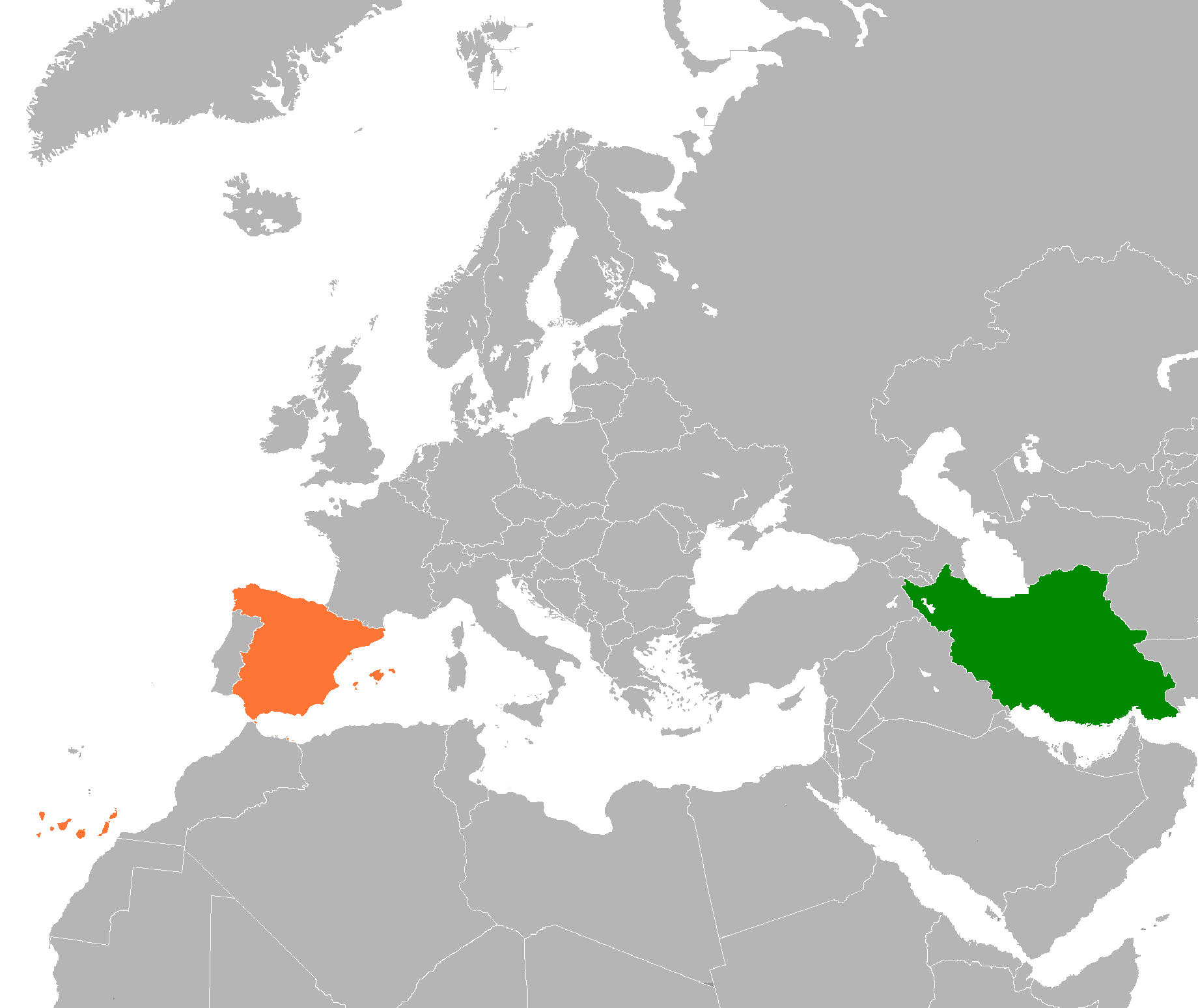

- Iran: Spain

Iran–Spain relations are the bilateral and diplomatic relations between these two countries. Iran has an embassy in Madrid, and Spain has an embassy in Tehran. Historical contacts between Persia and the Iberian Peninsula included cultural exchanges during the period of al-Andalus and diplomatic missions between Persian and Iberian rulers in the medieval and early modern periods. Persian intellectual traditions—astronomy, medicine, literature, philosophy—significantly influenced Andalusian scholarship. Many prominent scholars in Muslim Spain were of Iranian origin or trained in Persian-influenced intellectual circles. The poetic and musical heritage of Al-Andalus also absorbed Persian elements, helping shape its distinctive literary style.

The Safavid Empire established more structured contact with Europe. Spain, under the Habsburgs, viewed Safavid Iran as a strategic partner against the Ottoman Empire. Although geographic distance limited direct cooperation, both sides engaged in diplomatic exchanges, often mediated by missionaries or ambassadors traveling through Rome and Venice. Spanish Jesuits and other Catholic orders visited the Safavid court, documenting Persian society, art, and religion.

Modern diplomatic relations began in the 19th century. In the mid-1800s, Qajar Iran and the Kingdom of Spain initiated official state relations through the exchange of diplomatic missions and treaties. Iran and Spain developed stronger cultural ties, and Spain became a center for Iranology, with several institutions studying Persian history, archaeology, and literature.

== Diplomatic relations ==
Spain and Iran established diplomatic relations in April 1951. Relations subsequently developed through bilateral economic and cooperation agreements. Spain and Iran signed an Agreement on Trade and Economic Cooperation in Madrid on 11 July 1973, which entered into force on 14 July 1974.

== History ==
The Alans entered the Iberian Peninsula in 409 alongside the Sueves and Vandals. Following the overthrow of the Umayyad caliphate by the Abbasids in 750, Abd al-Rahman I fled to North Africa and later established the Emirate of Córdoba in al-Andalus in 756. Timur, the Transoxanian ruler of Iran, bestowed a high position of honor to the Castilian Ambassador in the early 15th century, an affront to the Chinese ambassador.

When the Ottomans began threatening Europe, Western kingdoms including Spain looked to Iran as a potential ally against the Ottomans; Charles, then king of Spain as Charles I, sent an envoy to the Shah of Iran in 1516–1519 with this purpose in mind. On 18 February 1529, Charles V, deeply alarmed by the Ottoman progression towards Vienna, again sent a letter from Toledo to Shah Ismail, who had died in 1524 and had been replaced by Shah Tahmasp, pleading for a military diversion. His ambassador to the Shah was the knight of Saint John de Balbi, and an alliance was made with the objective of making an attack on the Ottoman Empire in the west and the east within the following year. Tahmasp also responded by expressing his friendship to the Emperor. A decision was thus taken to attack the Ottoman Empire on both fronts, but Balbi took more than one year to return to the Iran, and by that time the situation had changed in Iran, as Iran was forced to make peace with the Ottoman Empire because of an insurrection of the Shaybanid Uzbeks. Contacts heightened with the Persian embassy to Europe (1599–1602), the final portion of which took place in Spain, where the Iranians met with king Philip III, and obtained seaborne transportation from Portugal to the Strait of Hormuz and Persia. In a final incident however, one of the members of the embassy, a religious mullah, was stabbed to death by a Spaniard in Mérida. The Iranians sent another embassy after 1609, but relations worsened when Shah Abbas seized Portuguese Hormuz.

Iran and Spain were among the only few countries to protest the 18th-century partitions of Poland.

=== 21st century ===
During the protests in Iran of 2021-2022, the Spanish government condemned the violence against peaceful protesters in Iran following the death of Mahsa Amini. It called for an independent investigation, the lifting of restrictions on communications, and an end to arbitrary arrests.

Spain's Senate Foreign Affairs approved a motion in February 2025 condemning executions and human rights violations in Iran, in addition to urging the Spanish government to apply greater diplomatic pressure on the Iranian government. The initiative received unanimous support from all parliamentary groups in the Senate Foreign Affairs Committee. The text supports the democratic aspirations of the Iranian people, including gender equality, the abolition of the death penalty, and the separation of religion and state, in line with the ten-point program of Maryam Rajavi.

==== 2026 Iran war ====
Spain and France supported the efforts of the European Union for the inclusion of the IRGC in the list of designated terrorist groups.

== Economic relations ==
Iran was among the three largest suppliers of crude oil to Spain in 2011, with almost 14% of imported oil. The situation changed radically with the approval of EU sanctions, which led to the total cessation of these imports. Spain has been the second EU country most affected after Greece and Italy.

In 2011, the last year before the sanctions, Spanish exports to Iran reached €655.3M, increasing by 33.2% against a 7.3% drop in the EU. Between 2009 and 2011, Spanish exports to Iran grew by almost 50%. In a global context, Spain accounted for 0.8% of total Iranian imports in 2011 and was the 21st supplier. For Spain, Iran was the 46th largest customer in the world, with 0.31% of total exports Spanish. According to Eurostat, trade between Iran and the European Union continued in 2024, with EU imports from Iran worth €834 million and exports to Iran worth €3.708 billion.

In 2024, the Shipping Association of Iran signed a memorandum of understanding with the Advanced Training Course in Transport and Logistics in Spain to enhance bilateral relations and improve training programs in the maritime transport sector.

== Cooperation ==
Tehran and Madrid held discussions in September 2024 to enhance cooperation between their think tanks. In a meeting with the Yazd Chamber of Commerce representatives, Spain's ambassador to Iran Antonio Sánchez-Benedito expressed his commitment to strengthening academic ties with Tehran. The Elcano Royal Institute also expressed a strong interest in working with Iranian researchers, policymakers, and think tanks on issues of mutual importance.

== Resident diplomatic missions ==
- Iran has an embassy in Madrid.
- Spain has an embassy in Tehran.
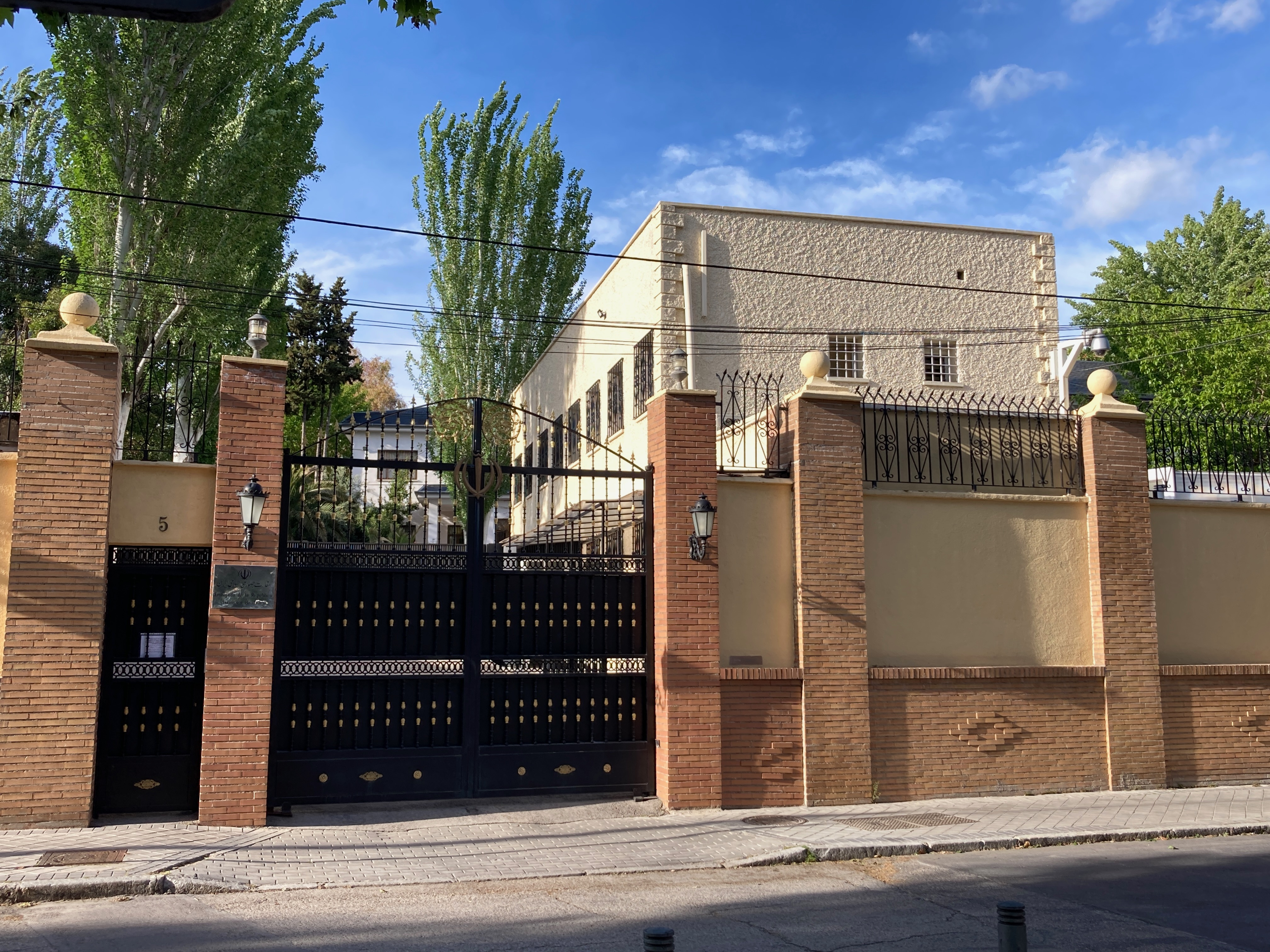
Embassy of Iran in Madrid

== See also ==
- Foreign relations of Iran
- Foreign relations of Spain
- Iranians in Spain
