= Group of Friends in Defense of the Charter of the United Nations =

Grouping within the United Nations member states

- Formation: July 6, 2021; 5 years ago
- Headquarters: 335 E 46th St; New York, NY 10017; United States
- Members: See § Membership
- Website: gof-uncharter.org

The Group of Friends in Defense of the Charter of the United Nations is a grouping at the United Nations, established in July 2021 in New York. The group was initially formed by 16 UN member states (Algeria, Angola, Belarus, Bolivia, Cambodia, China, Cuba, North Korea, Eritrea, Iran, Laos, Nicaragua, Russia, Saint Vincent and the Grenadines, Syria, and Venezuela) and one UN observer state (Palestine). Equatorial Guinea, Zimbabwe, and Mali have since joined the group, while Angola and Cambodia have withdrawn their membership, bringing the total membership of the group to 18 states.

The main goal of the grouping is to issue a message in support of the United Nations' founding treaty, commonly referred to as the UN Charter, seeking to promote multilateralism and diplomacy over the use of force against perceived violations from other UN Member States. The grouping was initiated by Venezuela.

== History ==
The March 10, 2021 concept note said "the world is seeing a growing resort to unilateralism, marked by isolationist and arbitrary actions, including the imposition of unilateral coercive measures or the withdrawal from landmark agreements and multilateral institutions, as well as by attempts to undermine critical efforts to tackle common and global challenges."In September 2022, six additional countries (Burundi, Ethiopia, Mali, Namibia, South Africa and Vietnam) participated as guests and/or observer(s) at the 3rd Ministerial Meeting of the Group of Friends, held in New York City, on the margins of the High-Level Week of the UN General Assembly.

In December 2022, the group held its First Meeting of National Coordinators in Tehran, resulting in the publication of their fifth political declaration.

The Group of Friends operates in New York, since its establishment in July 2021, and during first quarter of 2023 initiated its activities in Geneva. The Members of the Group of Friends have agreed to continue identifying other potential spaces for expanding the scope of action of the grouping, particularly to other cities that host United Nations Offices or other International Organizations.

== Membership ==
The following countries are currently members of the Group of Friends in Defense of the UN Charter, with a breakdown by continents as follows: 5 in Asia, 6 in Africa, 3 in North America, 2 in Europe, and 2 in South America.

1. Algeria
2. Belarus
3. Bolivia
4. China
5. Cuba
6. North Korea
7. Equatorial Guinea
8. Eritrea
9. Iran
10. Laos
11. Mali
12. Nicaragua
13. Palestine
14. Russia
15. Saint Vincent and the Grenadines
16. Uganda
17. Venezuela
18. Zimbabwe

=== Former members ===
1. Syria

== Political positions ==
The group advocates for a multipolar system in international relations. It stands against the practice of unilateral interventionism, and "concepts or notions that have not been internationally-agreed upon, such as the 'responsibility to protect' or a so-called 'rules-based order'". The group advocates for the lifting of sanctions and unilateral coercive measures against its members, such as Nicaragua, Iran, and Zimbabwe.

The group advocates for Palestine, endorsing its full membership of the UN and right to a capital in East Jerusalem. The group reaffirms their "firm commitment to the just cause of Palestine" and commits to "unwavering solidarity with the heroic Palestinian people in their ongoing struggle to achieve their inalienable rights, freedom and justice." They seek to support efforts "aimed at ending the Israeli occupation, which constitutes an illegal colonial occupation and apartheid regime, and at achieving the independence of the State of Palestine, with East Jerusalem as its capital."

=== Criticism ===
In response to the creation of the group, a senior European diplomat speaking on condition of anonymity to Reuters declared that "[t]hese so-called friends are the ones who have done most to breach the charter. Maybe they should start by respecting human rights and fundamental freedoms in their own countries."
