= Foreign relations of Iran =

Geography is an important factor in informing Iran's foreign policy. Following the 1979 Iranian Revolution, the newly formed Islamic Republic, under the leadership of Ayatollah Khomeini, dramatically reversed the pro-American foreign policy of the last Shah of Iran Mohammad Reza Pahlavi. Since Iran's policies then oscillated between the two opposing tendencies of revolutionary ardour to eliminate non-Muslim Western influences while promoting the Islamic revolution abroad, and pragmatism, which would advance economic development and normalization of relations, bilateral dealings can be confused and contradictory.

According to data published by RepTrak, Iran is the world's second least internationally reputable country, just ahead of Iraq, and has held that position for the three consecutive years of 2016, 2017, and 2018. Islamism and nuclear proliferation are recurring issues with Iran's foreign relations.

In a series of international polls by Pew Research in 2012, only Pakistan had the majority of its population supporting Iran's right to acquire nuclear arms; every other population polled overwhelmingly rejected a nuclear-armed Iran (90–95% opposed in the polled European, North American, and South American countries), and majorities in most of those polled nations were in favor of military action to prevent a nuclear-armed Iran from materializing. The majority of Americans, Brazilians, Japanese, Mexicans, Egyptians, Germans, Britons, French, Italians, Spaniards, and Poles (among other national groups within the poll) had majority support for "tougher sanctions" on Iran, while majorities in China, Russia, and Turkey opposed tougher sanctions.

== Background ==
Iranians have traditionally been highly sensitive to foreign interference in their country, pointing to such events as the Russian conquest of the northern parts of the country in the 19th century, the cancelled tobacco concession, the British and Russian occupations during the First and Second World Wars, and the CIA plot to overthrow Prime Minister Mohammad Mosaddegh. This suspicion manifests itself in attitudes that many foreigners might find incomprehensible, such as the "fairly common" belief that the 1979 Iranian Revolution was actually the work of a conspiracy between Iran's Shi'a clergy and the British government.

This may have been a result of the anti-Shah bias in BBC Radio's influential Persian broadcasts into Iran: a BBC report in March 2009 explained that many in Iran saw the broadcaster and the government as one, and interpreted the bias for Khomeini as evidence of weakening British government support for the Shah. It is entirely plausible that the BBC did indeed help hasten revolutionary events.

=== Significant historical treaties ===
- Treaty of Zuhab 1639, by which Iran irrevocably lost Mesopotamia (Iraq) to the Ottomans. This roughly settled the present Iran-Iraq-Turkey borders.
- Treaty of Gulistan 1813, by which Iran irrevocably lost Georgia, Dagestan, and most of Azerbaijan.
- Treaty of Turkmenchay 1828, by which Iran irrevocably lost Armenia and the remainder of the contemporary Republic of Azerbaijan (comprising the Lankaran and Nakchivan khanates).
- Treaty of Paris (1857) (by which Iran renounced claims over Herat and parts of Afghanistan)
- Treaty of Akhal 1881
- Anglo-Russian Convention 1907

== Revolutionary period under Khomeini ==
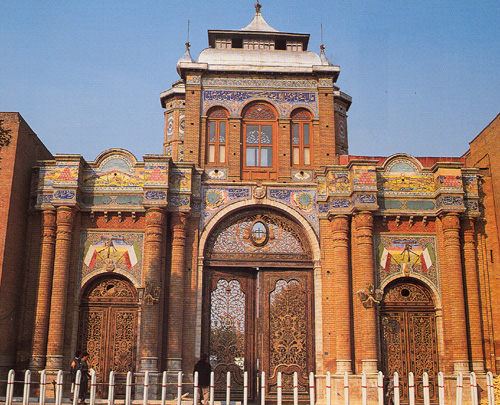
Darvazeh-e-Bagh-e-Melli: the main gates to Iran's Ministry of Foreign Affairs in Tehran.

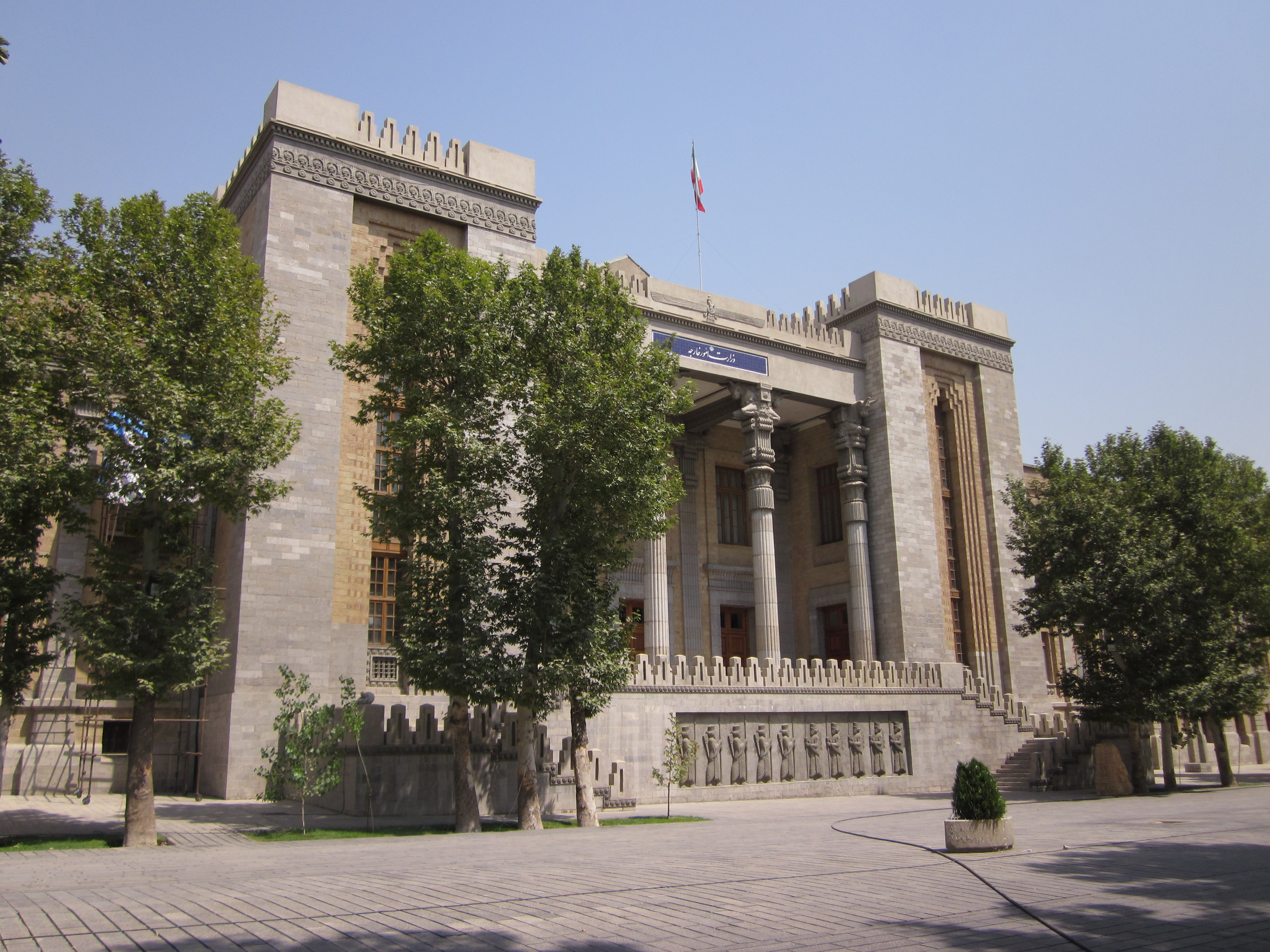
The newly renovated building of Iran's Ministry of Foreign Affairs uses pre-Islamic Persian architecture extensively in its facade.

Under Khomeini's government, Iran's foreign policy often emphasized the elimination of foreign influence and the spread of Islamic revolution over state-to-state relations or the furtherance of trade. In Khomeini's own words:

We shall export our revolution to the whole world. Until the cry "There is no God but Allah" resounds over the whole world, there will be struggle.

The Islamic Republic's effort to spread the revolution is considered to have begun in earnest in March 1982, when 380 men from more than 25 Arab and Islamic nations met at the former Tehran Hilton Hotel for a "seminar" on the "ideal Islamic government" and, less academically, the launch of a large-scale offensive to cleanse the Islamic world of the satanic Western and Communist influences that were seen to be hindering the Islamic world's progress. The gathering of militants, primarily Shi'a but including some Sunnis, "with various religious and revolutionary credentials", was hosted by the Association of Militant Clerics and the Pasdaran Islamic Revolutionary Guards.

The nerve centre of the revolutionary crusade, operational since shortly after the 1979 revolution, was located in downtown Tehran and known to outsiders as the "Taleghani Centre". Here the groundwork for the gathering was prepared: the establishment of Arab cadres, recruited or imported from surrounding countries to spread the revolution, and provision of headquarters for such groups as the Islamic Front for the Liberation of Bahrain, the Iraqi Shi'a movement, and Philippine Moro, Kuwaiti, Saudi, North African and Lebanese militant clerics.

These groups came under the umbrella of the "Council for the Islamic Revolution", which was supervised by Ayatollah Hussein Ali Montazeri, the designated heir of Ayatollah Khomeini. Most of the council's members were clerics, but they also reportedly included advisors from the Syrian and Libyan intelligence agencies. The council apparently received more than $1 billion annually in contributions from the faithful in other countries and in funds allocated by the Iranian government.

Its strategy was two-pronged: armed struggle against what were perceived as Western imperialism and its agents; and an internal purifying process to free Islamic territory and Muslim minds of non-Islamic cultural, intellectual and spiritual influences, by providing justice, services, resources to the mustazafin (weak) masses of the Muslim world. These attempts to spread its Islamic revolution strained the country's relations with many of its Arab neighbours, and the extrajudicial execution of Iranian dissidents in Europe unnerved European nations, particularly France and Germany. For example, the Islamic Republic expressed its opinion of Egypt's secular government by naming a street in Tehran after Egyptian President Anwar Sadat's killer, Khalid al-Istanbuli. At this time Iran found itself very isolated, but this was a secondary consideration to the spread of revolutionary ideals across the Persian Gulf and confrontation with the US (or "Great Satan") in the 1979-1981 hostage crisis.

=== Revolutionary influence and regional interventions ===
Arab and other Muslim volunteers who came to Iran were trained in camps run by the Revolutionary Guards. There were three primary bases in Tehran, and others in Ahvaz, Isfahan, Qom, Shiraz, and Mashhad, and a further facility, converted in 1984, near the southern naval base at Bushire.

In 1981 Iran supported an attempt to overthrow the Bahraini government, in 1983 expressed political support for Shi'ites who bombed Western embassies in Kuwait, and in 1987 Iranian pilgrims rioted at poor living conditions and treatment during the Hajj (pilgrimage) in Mecca, Saudi Arabia, and were consequently massacred. Nations with strong fundamentalist movements, such as Egypt and Algeria, also began to mistrust Iran. With the Israeli invasion of Lebanon, Iran was thought to be supporting the creation of the Hizballah organization. Iran went on to oppose the Arab–Israeli peace process, because it saw Israel as an illegal country.

=== Iran–Iraq War ===
Iranian relations with Iraq have never been good. They took a turn for the worse in 1980 when Iraq invaded Iran. The stated reason for Iraq's invasion was the contested sovereignty over the Shatt al-Arab waterway (Arvand Rud in Persian). Other unstated reasons were probably more significant: Iran and Iraq had a history of interference in each other's affairs by supporting separatist movements, although this interference had ceased since the Algiers Agreement.

Iran demanded the withdrawal of Iraqi troops from Iranian territory and the return to the status quo ante for the Shatt al-Arab, as established under the Algiers Agreement. This period saw Iran become even more isolated, with virtually no allies. Exhausted by the war, Iran signed UN Security Council Resolution 598 in July 1988, after the United States and Germany began supplying Iraq with chemical weapons. The ceasefire resulting from the UN resolution was implemented on 20 August 1988.

Neither nation had made any real gains in the war, which left one million dead and had a dramatic effect on the country's foreign policy. From this point on, the Islamic Republic recognized that it had no choice but to moderate its radical approach and rationalize its objectives. This was the beginning of what Anoushiravan Ehteshami calls the "reorientation phase" of Iranian foreign policy.

=== Pragmatism ===
Like other revolutionary states, practical considerations have sometimes led the Islamic Republic to inconsistency and subordination of such ideological concerns as pan-Islamic solidarity. One observer, Graham Fuller, has called the Islamic Republic "stunningly silent"

about [Muslim] Chechens in [non-Muslim] Russia, or Uyghurs in China, simply because the Iranian state has important strategic ties with both China and Russia that need to be preserved in the state interest. Iran has astonishingly even supported Christian Armenia in the First Nagorno-Karabakh War against Shi'ite Azerbaijan and has been careful not to lend too much support to Islamic Tajiks in Tajikistan, where the language is basically a dialect of Persian.

== Khamenei's leadership ==
=== Post-war foreign policy and regional influence ===
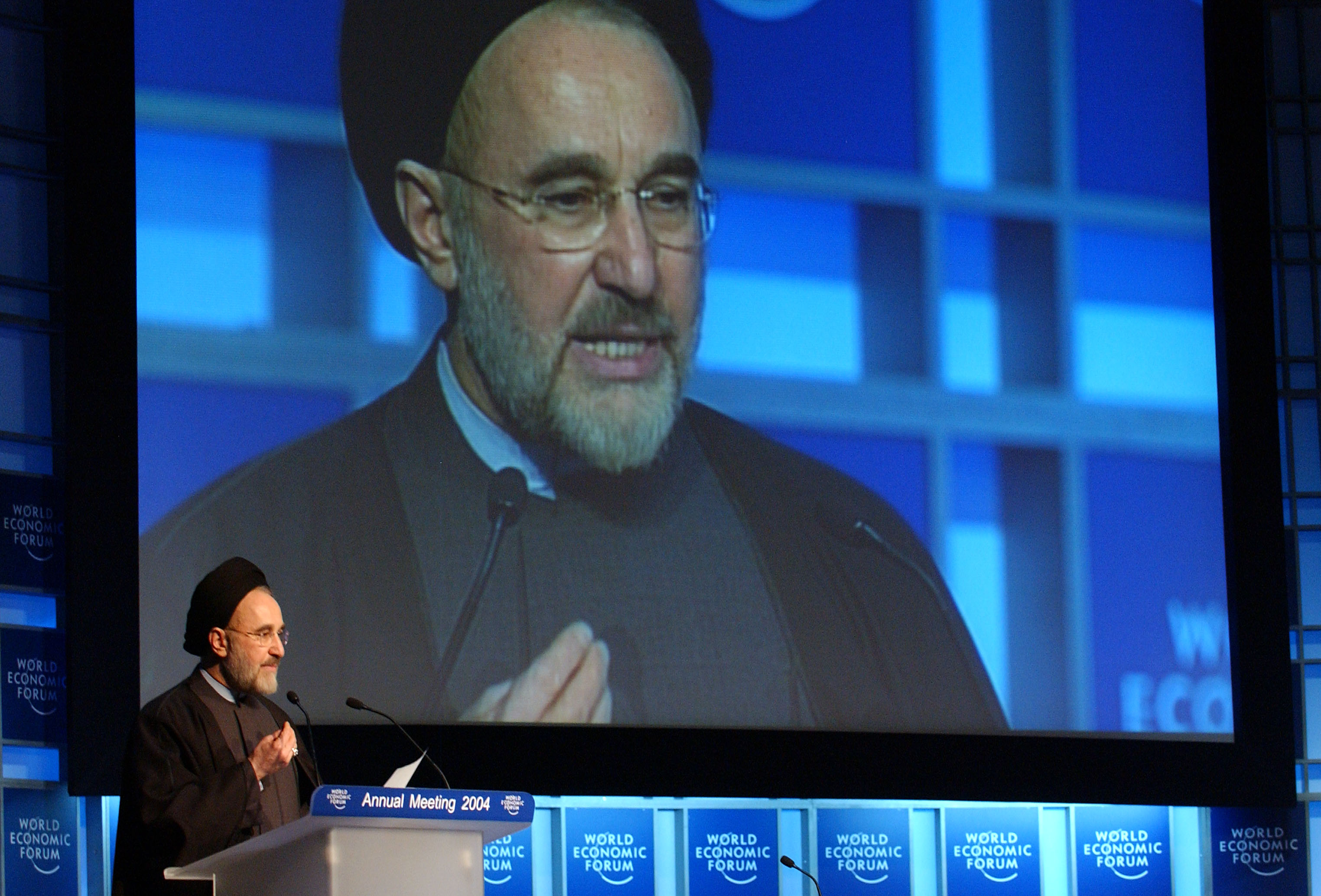
President Khatami (in office: 1997–2005) played a key role in repairing Iran's foreign relations with Europe.

Since the end of the Iran–Iraq War, Iran's new foreign policy has had a dramatic effect on its global standing. Relations with the European Union have dramatically improved, to the point where Iran is a major oil exporter and a trading partner with such countries as Italy, France, and Germany. China and Pakistan have also emerged as friends of Iran; these three countries face similar challenges in the global economy as they industrialize, and consequently find themselves aligned on a number of issues.

Iran maintains regular diplomatic and commercial relations with Russia and the former Soviet Republics. Both Iran and Russia believe they have important national interests at stake in developments in Central Asia and the Transcaucasus, particularly concerning energy resources from the Caspian Sea. The Islamic Republic of Iran accords priority to its relations with the other states in the region and with the rest of the Islamic world. This includes a strong commitment to the Organisation of Islamic Cooperation (OIC) and the Non-Aligned Movement.

Relations with the states of the Gulf Cooperation Council (GCC), especially with Saudi Arabia, are characterized by rivalry and hostility. An unresolved territorial dispute with the United Arab Emirates concerning three islands in the Persian Gulf continues to mar its relations with these states. Iran has close relations with Kuwait.

=== Isolation, sanctions, and global ambitions ===
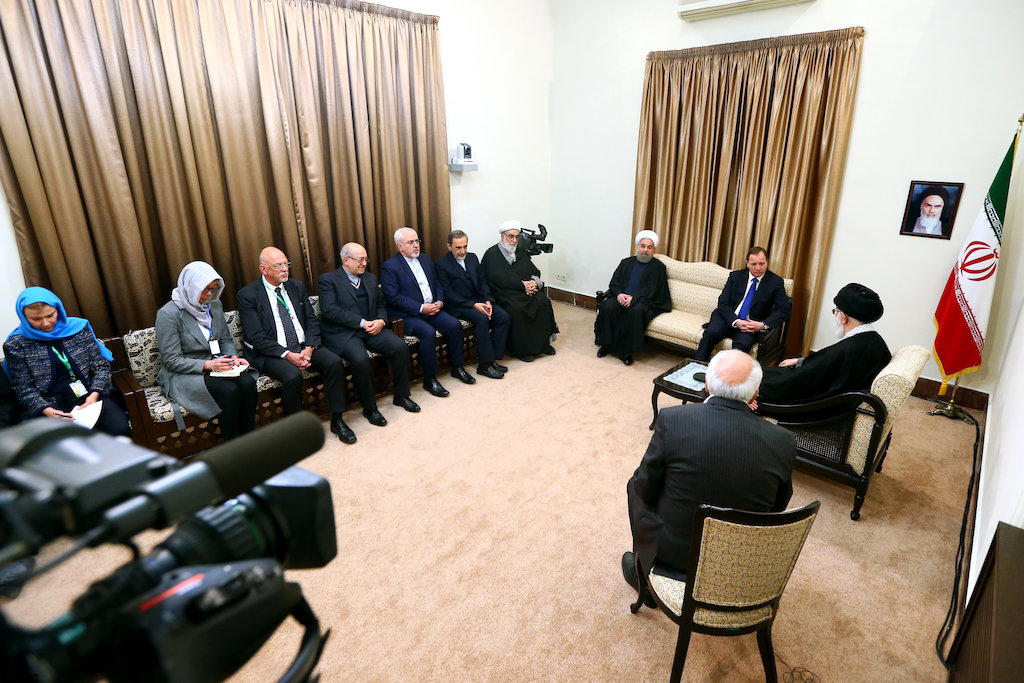
Ali Khamenei with Swedish Prime Minister Stefan Löfven, February 2017

Iran seeks new allies around the world due to its increasing political and economic isolation in the international community. This isolation is evident in the various economic sanctions and the EU oil embargo that have been implemented in response to questions that have been raised over the Iranian nuclear program.

Tehran supports the Interim Governing Council in Iraq, but it strongly advocates a prompt and full transfer of state authority to the Iraqi people. Iran hopes for stabilization in Afghanistan and supports the reconstruction effort so that the Afghan refugees in Iran (which number approximately 2.5 million.) can return to their homeland and the flow of drugs from Afghanistan can be stemmed. Iran is also pursuing a policy of stabilization and cooperation with the countries of the Caucasus and Central Asia, whereby it is seeking to capitalise on its central location to establish itself as the political and economic hub of the region.

On the international scene, it has been argued by some that Iran has become, or will become in the near future, a superpower due to its ability to influence international events. Others, such as Robert Baer, have argued that Iran is already an energy superpower and is on its way to becoming an empire. Flynt Leverett calls Iran a rising power that might well become a nuclear power in coming years—if the US does not prevent Iran from acquiring nuclear technology, as part of a grand bargain under which Iran would cease its nuclear activities in exchange for a guarantee of its borders by the US.

=== Territorial disputes ===
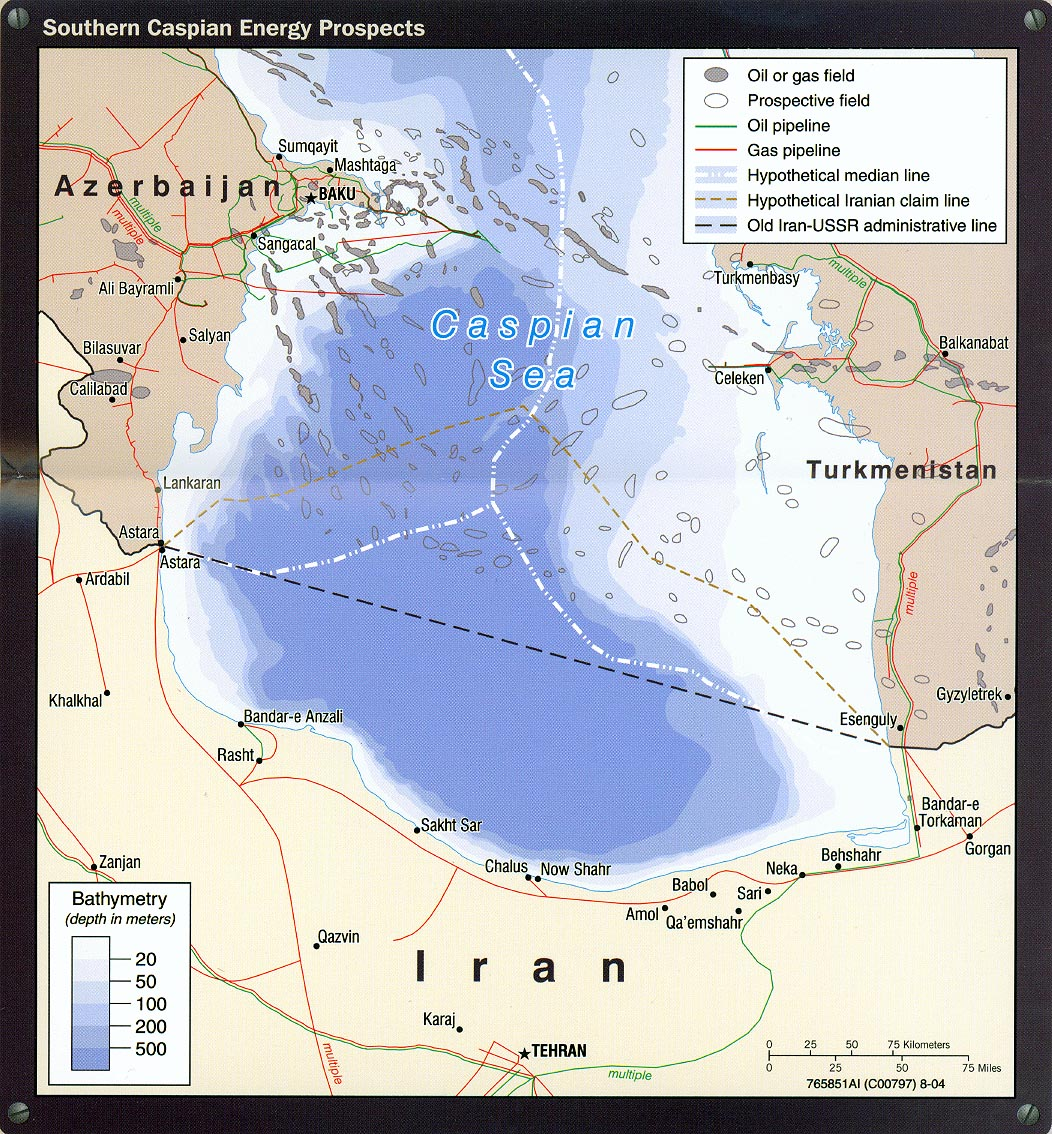
Southern Caspian Energy Prospects (portion of Iran). Country Profile 2004.

- Iran and Iraq restored diplomatic relations in 1990, but they are still trying to work out written agreements settling outstanding disputes from their eight-year war concerning border demarcation, prisoners of war, and freedom of navigation in and sovereignty over the Shatt al-Arab waterway.
- Iran governs and possesses two islands in the Persian Gulf claimed by the UAE: Lesser Tunb (which the UAE calls Tunb as Sughra in Arabic, and Iran calls Jazireh-ye Tonb-e Kuchek in Persian) and Greater Tunb (Arabic Tunb al Kubra, Persian Jazireh-ye Tonb-e Bozorg).
- Iran jointly administers with the UAE an island in the Persian Gulf claimed by the UAE (Arabic Abu Musa, Persian, Jazireh-ye Abu Musa), over which Iran has taken steps to exert unilateral control since 1992, including access restrictions.
- The Caspian Sea borders between Azerbaijan, Iran, and Turkmenistan are not yet determined, although this problem is set to be resolved peacefully in the coming years through slow negotiations. After the breakup of the USSR, the newly independent republics bordering the Caspian Sea claimed shares of territorial waters and the seabed, thus unilaterally abrogating the existing half-and-half USSR-Iran agreements which, like all other Soviet treaties, the republics had agreed to respect upon their independence. It has been suggested by these countries that the Caspian Sea should be divided in proportion to each bordering country's shoreline, in which case Iran's share would be reduced to about 13%. The Iranian side has expressed eagerness to know if this means that all Irano–Russian and –Soviet agreements are void, entitling Iran to claim territorial sovereignty over lands lost to Russia by treaties that the parties still consider vivant. Issues between Russia, Kazakhstan, and Azerbaijan were settled in 2003, but Iran does not recognize these agreements, on the premise that the international law governing open water can not be applied to the Caspian Sea, which is in fact a lake (a landlocked body of water). Iran has not pressed its Caspian territorial claims in recent years.

=== Twelve-Day War ===
Israel launched surprise attacks on key military and nuclear facilities in Iran on 13 June 2025, which started the Twelve-Day War. Israeli air and ground forces assassinated some of Iran's prominent military leaders, nuclear scientists, and politicians. and damaged or destroyed Iran's air defenses and some of its nuclear and military facilities. Iran retaliated with waves of missile and drone strikes against Israeli cities and military sites. The United States, which defended Israel against Iranian missiles and drones, took offensive action on the ninth day of the war by bombing three Iranian nuclear sites. Iran retaliated by firing missiles at a U.S. base in Qatar.

European powers, especially France, proposed a diplomatic deal offering Iran limited sanctions relief and recognition of peaceful nuclear rights in exchange for halting uranium enrichment and cutting support to regional militias. Meanwhile, Russia and China supported Iran politically, criticizing Israeli aggression, but avoided direct involvement. Gulf states like Qatar and Oman acted as neutral intermediaries, facilitating indirect communication between Iran, the United States, and Israel. G7 foreign ministers, meeting shortly afterward in The Hague on June 25, reinforced the message by urging Iran to resume cooperation with the International Atomic Energy Agency (IAEA) and return to nuclear negotiations. These combined efforts led to a fragile ceasefire on June 24. Khamenei's isolation during the war, with access restricted to his closest aides, coincided with diplomatic efforts in Geneva, which Arab officials said were complicated by him being difficult to reach.

=== Foreign policies ===
- The policy of exporting the Islamic Revolution
- Theory of Umm al-Qura
- Pattern-making of the Islamic Republic
- De-escalation
- Dialogue Among Civilizations
- Look to the East
- Axis of Resistance
- Iran Experts Initiative
- Foreign policy of the Masoud Pezeshkian administration

== Ministry of Foreign Affairs ==
The Minister of Foreign Affairs of Iran is selected by the President of Iran.

== Diplomatic relations ==
List of countries which the Islamic Republic of Iran maintains diplomatic relations with:

#	Country	Date
1	Russia	1521
2	France	13 August 1715
3	United Kingdom	5 June 1807
4	Spain	4 March 1842
5	Netherlands	5 January 1883
—	United States (suspended)	11 June 1883
6	Italy	18 February 1886
7	Belgium	27 November 1889
8	Sweden	5 September 1897
9	Bulgaria	15 November 1897
10	Romania	24 July 1902
11	Argentina	27 July 1902
12	Greece	19 November 1902
13	Brazil	17 June 1903
14	Norway	14 October 1908
15	Switzerland	4 March 1919
16	Afghanistan	2 May 1920
17	Denmark	3 February 1922
—	Egypt (suspended)	1923
18	Czech Republic	22 June 1925
19	Austria	26 July 1925
20	Hungary	1925
21	Poland	19 March 1927
22	Turkey	21 October 1928
23	Iraq	25 April 1929
24	Japan	4 August 1929
25	Saudi Arabia	24 August 1929
26	Finland	12 December 1931
27	Luxembourg	23 May 1936
28	Serbia	30 April 1937
29	Chile	6 June 1944
30	Lebanon	21 September 1944
31	Syria	12 November 1946
32	Pakistan	22 August 1947
33	Iceland	15 March 1948
34	Jordan	16 November 1949
35	India	15 March 1950
36	Indonesia	July 1950
37	Venezuela	9 August 1950
38	Ethiopia	1950
39	Germany	26 February 1952
—	Holy See	2 May 1953
—	Canada (suspended)	9 January 1955
40	Thailand	9 November 1955
41	Portugal	15 October 1956
—	Morocco (suspended)	5 November 1957
42	Tunisia	5 November 1957
43	Dominican Republic	24 October 1958
44	Kuwait	17 December 1961
45	South Korea	23 October 1962
46	Sri Lanka	1962
47	Philippines	22 January 1964
48	Algeria	23 September 1964
49	Mexico	15 October 1964
50	Nepal	14 December 1964
51	Libya	30 December 1967
52	Laos	1967
53	Myanmar	8 August 1968
54	Australia	21 September 1968
55	Eswatini	15 December 1969
56	Malaysia	16 June 1970
57	Malawi	5 April 1971
58	Guinea	26 April 1971
59	Senegal	13 May 1971
60	Mongolia	20 May 1971
—	Albania (suspended)	24 May 1971
—	Yemen (suspended)	May 1971
61	China	16 August 1971
62	Oman	26 August 1971
63	Mauritius	25 September 1971
64	Kenya	3 October 1971
65	Qatar	16 October 1971
66	Lesotho	15 December 1971
67	Nigeria	5 May 1972
68	Malta	11 May 1972
69	Chad	19 July 1972
70	Sudan	22 August 1972
71	United Arab Emirates	28 October 1972
—	Bahrain (suspended)	9 December 1972
—	Somalia (suspended)	1972
72	Democratic Republic of the Congo	11 February 1973
73	North Korea	15 April 1973
74	Zambia	7 July 1973
75	Ecuador	19 July 1973
76	Vietnam	4 August 1973
77	Singapore	6 August 1973
78	Trinidad and Tobago	September 1973
79	Mauritania	25 October 1973
—	Peru (suspended)	20 November 1973
80	New Zealand	14 December 1973
81	Haiti	16 April 1974
82	Bangladesh	21 June 1974
83	Ghana	7 July 1974
84	Uganda	12 October 1974
85	Gabon	26 November 1974
86	Panama	7 January 1975
87	Gambia	27 January 1975
88	Cuba	10 February 1975
89	Jamaica	18 February 1975
90	Cameroon	10 March 1975
91	Central African Republic	18 March 1975
92	Mali	12 April 1975
—	Colombia (suspended)	28 April 1975
93	Liberia	2 June 1975
94	Maldives	2 June 1975
95	Niger	11 June 1975
96	Costa Rica	16 June 1975
97	Ivory Coast	2 October 1975
98	Uruguay	25 November 1975
99	Ireland	17 February 1976
100	Nicaragua	29 April 1976
101	San Marino	30 July 1976
102	Seychelles	July 1976
103	Comoros	September 1976
104	Barbados	1 March 1978
105	Djibouti	4 April 1978
—	Sahrawi Arab Democratic Republic	22 June 1980
106	Tanzania	13 October 1982
107	Zimbabwe	11 February 1983
108	Mozambique	13 February 1983
109	Sierra Leone	12 March 1983
110	Madagascar	13 July 1983
111	Grenada	August 1983
112	Benin	1983
113	Burkina Faso	1 November 1984
114	Burundi	31 March 1985
115	Rwanda	October 1985
116	São Tomé and Príncipe	November 1985
117	Angola	8 January 1986
118	Guyana	6 September 1986
119	Republic of the Congo	25 November 1986
120	Cyprus	29 September 1988
121	Botswana	September 1988
—	State of Palestine	1989
122	Namibia	21 March 1990
123	Brunei	1 May 1990
124	Guinea-Bissau	22 August 1990
125	Tajikistan	9 January 1992
126	Ukraine	22 January 1992
127	Kazakhstan	29 January 1992
128	Armenia	9 February 1992
129	Turkmenistan	18 February 1992
130	Slovenia	9 March 1992
131	Azerbaijan	12 March 1992
132	Croatia	18 April 1992
133	Kyrgyzstan	10 May 1992
134	Uzbekistan	10 May 1992
135	Moldova	11 May 1992
136	Georgia	15 May 1992
137	Cambodia	5 June 1992
138	Latvia	7 July 1992
139	Estonia	18 August 1992
140	Belize	24 November 1992
141	Slovakia	1 January 1993
142	Bosnia and Herzegovina	25 January 1993
143	Guatemala	25 January 1993
144	Paraguay	19 February 1993
145	Belarus	18 March 1993
146	Lithuania	4 November 1993
147	South Africa	10 May 1994
148	Cape Verde	November 1994
149	North Macedonia	10 March 1995
—	Cook Islands	1996
150	Suriname	11 December 1997
151	Togo	January 1998
152	Equatorial Guinea	20 July 1998
153	Liechtenstein	14 August 1998
154	Timor-Leste	10 November 2003
155	Montenegro	28 July 2006
156	Eritrea	31 May 2007
157	Bolivia	8 September 2007
158	Saint Vincent and the Grenadines	13 July 2008
159	Tuvalu	2008
160	Monaco	10 May 2012
161	Fiji	29 August 2012
162	Andorra	30 September 2015
163	Antigua and Barbuda	1 October 2015
164	Dominica	2018

== Bilateral relations ==
=== Africa ===
In 2009, Foreign Minister Manouchehr Mottaki said that if Iran and Africa works together, both can largely meet each other’s interest. Some signs of disillusionment began to emerge when 20 African nations threatened to close their embassies in Tehran following what they saw as Ahmadinejad's failure to live up to the promises he made during his trips to Africa.

Country	Formal relations began	Notes
Algeria		See Algeria–Iran relations Algeria is one of the few Arab and Sunni nations that has been friendly towards Iran. Iran is also one of the only states in the Middle East to voice support for the Polisario Front, a rebel movement backed by Algeria.
Burundi	31 March 1985	See Burundi–Iran relations Both countries established diplomatic relations on 31 March 1985.
Comoros		Comoros severed diplomatic relations with Iran in January 2016, but they were reestablished by 2023.
Egypt	1939 (Diplomatic relations severed 30 April 1979)	See Egypt–Iran relations: Egypt has an interest section in Tehran.
Gambia		In November 2010, Gambia broke off diplomatic relations with Iran in reaction to a weapons shipment. The Gambian government allowed Iranians 48 hours to leave the country. Diplomatic relations were reestablished on 29 July 2024.
Ghana		Iran and Ghana maintain a historic special relationship and Iran has an embassy in Ghana and Ghana has an embassy in Tehran.
Guinea-Bissau	22 August 1990	Both countries established diplomatic relations on 22 August 1990 Both countries cooperate in various fields (education, mining, health, pharmaceuticals, agriculture, development and energy).
Libya	30 December 1967	See Iran-Libya relations Both countries established diplomatic relations on 30 December 1967. The relations between two countries began in 1967 when both countries were governed by monarchs. The relations became strained when Muammar Gaddafi seized the power on 1 September 1969 due to his alliance with other Arab leaders such as Gamal Nasser against Shah Mohammad Reza.
Morocco	(Diplomatic relations severed in May 2018)	See Iran–Morocco relations There have been several instances in which Iran and Morocco have mostly or completely severed diplomatic relations. Iran cut off diplomatic ties with Morocco in 1981 after King Hassan II gave asylum to the exiled Shah. It took almost a decade for relations to thaw; Prime Minister Abderrahmane Youssoufi of Morocco led the first Moroccan delegation to the Islamic Republic of Iran. Economic ties increased greatly in 2009. On 6 March 2009, Morocco severed diplomatic ties with Iran, offering several reasons. Morocco's Foreign Ministry said it was a result of Iran's spreading the Shi'ite variety of Islam in Sunni Morocco constituted interference in domestic affairs. On 1 May 2018, Morocco severed diplomatic ties with Iran over Tehran's support for the Polisario Front, a Western Sahara independence movement. Morocco's Foreign Minister Nasser Bourita told reporters Morocco would close its embassy in Tehran and would expel the Iranian ambassador in Rabat.
Senegal	13 May 1971	See Iran–Senegal relations Both countries established diplomatic relations on 13 May 1971. Iranian president Mahmoud Ahmadinejad and his Senegalese counterpart Abdoulaye Wade pledged to expand bilateral ties in the fields of economics, tourism and politics in addition to increased efforts to empower OIC. Iran Khodro established an assembly line to produce Iranian cars in Senegal for African markets. The company had the capacity to produce 10,000 Samand cars annually. In February 2011, Senegal severed diplomatic relations with Iran as it accused Iran of supplying weapons to rebels in the Casamance region.
South Africa	10 May 1994	See Iran–South Africa relations Both countries established diplomatic relations on 10 May 1994. South Africa and Iran share historical bilateral relations and the latter supported the South African liberation movements. It severed official relations with South Africa in 1979 and imposed a trade boycott in protest against the country's Apartheid policies. In January 1994 Iran lifted all trade and economic sanctions against South Africa and diplomatic relations were reestablished on 10 May 1994.
Sudan	22 August 1972	See Iran–Sudan relations Both countries established diplomatic relations on 22 August 1972 Owing to various cultural and historical compatibilities, Iran and Sudan have generally sought a very cordial and friendly relationship. The two nations share membership in the OIC and the Group of 77. Although they differ in ethnic identity (Iran is predominantly Persian, while Sudan is Afro-Arab) and denomination (the two nations are Muslim, but the former is mainly Shi'a, while the latter is Sunni), Iran and Sudan have a common strategic bond with both the People's Republic of China and Russia, and a common animosity towards the United States. Relations between Tehran and Khartoum have continued to grow, especially since April 2006, when then President Mahmoud Ahmadinejad voiced his opposition to the deployment in the Darfur region of Western peacekeepers from the United Nations. Sudan ardently supports Iran's nuclear program. Both countries are also firmly against Israel. On 4 January 2016, Sudan cut off all diplomatic relations with Iran due to tensions between Saudi Arabia and Iran. On 6 July 2023, Iran and Sudan agreed to restore diplomatic relations. During the ongoing Sudanese Civil War, Iran has actively backed Sudan's internationally recognized government, providing more than just diplomatic rhetoric. In October 2025, Iranian Deputy Foreign Minister Abbas Araghchi held a phone call with his Sudanese counterpart, in which he not only condemned attacks on civilians in Al-Fashir but also framed Iran’s stance as a clear rejection of any attempt to fragment Sudan. The Sudanese official briefed Araghchi on battlefield developments and explicitly thanked Tehran for its sustained political solidarity and material support for the Sudanese people. During the 2026 Iran war, pro-SAF Islamist factions openly declared solidarity with Iran, while multiple reports confirmed that Iran had supplied combat drones to the SAF — a transfer widely credited with shifting the balance of power against the Rapid Support Forces (RSF). In a major escalation of pressure, the U.S. State Department sanctioned the Sudanese Muslim Brotherhood (closely aligned with the SAF) specifically because its fighters were "receiving training and other support from Iran's Islamic Revolutionary Guard Corps (IRGC)."
Zimbabwe	11 February 1983	Both countries established diplomatic relations on 11 February 1983. There are growing economic, social and cultural ties between Iran and Zimbabwe. Relations between Iran and Zimbabwe started in 1979 when the late Vice President Simon Muzenda visited Tehran to meet leaders of the Islamic Revolution of Iran. Zimbabwe opened an embassy in Tehran in 2003. In 2005 President Mugabe confirmed the formal engagement of Iran in bilateral relations during the State visit to Zimbabwe by Iranian President Mohammad Khatami. In 2009 President Mugabe in a state TV address confirmed his support for the Iranian nuclear program and the shared struggle against "demagogues and international dictators". In 2022, Dr Auxillia Mnangagwa, First Lady of Zimbabwe, visited Iran, focusing on philanthropic work: she spoke of the shared experience of the two countries: "I appreciate the cordial relations that exist between the two countries, Zimbabwe and Iran. We are both victims of illegal sanctions [sic] therefore, we should learn from each other's experiences".

=== Americas ===
Trade between Iran and Brazil quadrupled between 2002 and 2007, and it will further increase as much as fivefold, from $2 billion to $10 billion annually. In addition to Brazil, Iran has signed dozens of economic agreements with Bolivia, Cuba, Ecuador and Nicaragua. In Nicaragua, Iran and Venezuela have agreed to invest $350 million in building a deepwater seaport off the Caribbean coast, in addition to a cross-country system of pipelines, rails and highways. Iranian firms are also planning to build two cement factories in Bolivia. Other developments include the agreement reached with Ecuador to build a cement factory as well as several other industrial cooperation MoUs (2008). In the four years after Ahmadinejad ascended to the Iranian presidency in 2005, Iran opened six new embassies in Latin America. The new embassies are located in Bolivia, Chile, Colombia, Ecuador, Nicaragua and Uruguay - in addition to the five already in operation in Argentina, Brazil, Cuba, Mexico and Venezuela.

Country	Formal relations began	Notes
Argentina	27 July 1902	See Argentina–Iran relations Both countries established diplomatic relations on 27 July 1902.: Argentina has an embassy in Tehran.; Iran has an embassy in Buenos Aires.
Brazil		See Iran–Brazil relations Brazil and Iran have enjoyed increasingly close political relations over the years, growing with the volume of bilateral trade and economic cooperation. The election of Dilma Rousseff as president of Brazil has brought a change to Brazilian policy towards Iran. Rousseff harshly criticized the human rights situation in Iran. During her electoral campaign she said that women stoning in Iran is "Medieval behavior." and after coming into office Brazil supported a resolution for nominating a U.N. special rapporteur for human rights in Iran, whose eventual report condemned Iranian rights abuses. in response Iranian President Ahmadinejad's media adviser, Ali Akbar Javanfekr, was quoted as stating that Rousseff had "destroyed years of good relations" between them Ahmadinejad did not go to Brazil while touring South America in January 2012.
Canada	1955 (Diplomatic relations severed on 7 September 2012)	See Canada–Iran relations Canadian–Iranian relations date back to 1955, up to which point Canadian consular and commercial affairs in Iran were handled by the British Embassy. A Canadian diplomatic mission was constructed in Tehran in 1959 and raised to Embassy status in 1961. Due to rocky relations after the Iranian Revolution, Iran did not establish an embassy in Canada until 1991 when its staff, which had been living in a building on Roosevelt Avenue in Ottawa's west end, moved into 245 Metcalfe Street in the Centretown neighbourhood of Ottawa and the mission was upgraded to embassy status. On 7 September 2012, Canada broke off diplomatic relations with Iran, saying "It is among the world's worst violators of human rights; and it shelters and materially supports terrorist groups." In a statement, Canadian foreign minister John Baird said "the Iranian regime has shown blatant disregard for the Vienna Convention and its guarantee of protection for diplomatic personnel. Under the circumstances, Canada can no longer maintain a diplomatic presence in Iran. Our diplomats serve Canada as civilians, and their safety is our number one priority." The announcement of embassy closure happened on the same day that the movie Argo, about the Canadian Caper, was released at the Toronto International Film Festival. Following the election of Justin Trudeau in October 2015, the new Canadian government is looking to repair diplomatic relations with Iran and lifted most of its economic sanctions, following a historic Iranian nuclear deal in July 2015. Canada engaged in sanctions against the Guidance Patrol.
Cuba	10 February 1975	See Cuba–Iran relations Both countries established diplomatic relations on 10 February 1975. Iran has a productive trade balance with Cuba and both also have good and friendly relations. The two governments signed a document to bolster cooperation in Havana in January 2006. Former President Mahmoud Ahmadinejad called relations "firm and progressive" over the past three decades.
Ecuador	19 July 1973	See Ecuador–Iran relations Both countries established diplomatic relations on 19 July 1973. In early 2010, Ecuadorian President Rafael Correa alleged his country was being sanctioned because of ties to Iran. After an attempted coup against Correa in 2010, the two countries signalled intentions to deepen ties.
Mexico	15 October 1964	See Iran–Mexico relations Both countries established diplomatic relations on 15 October 1964. The first diplomatic contacts between Mexico and Iran took place in 1889. The first agreement of friendly relationship, established the lines of cooperation and interchange between two friend nations was signed on 24 March in 1937. Mexico and Iran have enjoyed increasingly close political and economic relations over the years, growing with the volume of bilateral trade and economic cooperation. The two countries aim to expand cooperation in several sectors, sharing science and technology, particularly in the oil industry. Both countries have also shared successful experiences in cultural cooperation and exchange. In 2008, an agreement to form a Mexico-Iran parliamentary friendship group was made at the Mexican parliament.: Iran has an embassy in Mexico City.; Mexico has an embassy in Tehran.
United States	1883; Diplomatic relations severed on 7 April 1980	See Iran–United States relations Former US Secretary of State, John Kerry with Iranian Foreign Minister Mohammad Javad Zarif in Switzerland, 2015. Political relations between Iran and the United States began in the mid-to-late 19th century, but had slight importance and aroused little controversy until the post-World War II era of the Cold War and the rise of petroleum exports from the Persian Gulf. An era of close alliance between Shah Mohammad Reza Pahlavi's regime and the American government was followed by a dramatic reversal and hostility between the two countries after the 1979 Iranian Revolution. Currently, Iranian interests in the United States are handled through the Pakistani embassy. Opinions differ over what has caused the decades of poor relations. Explanations offered include a "natural and unavoidable" conflict between the Islamic Revolution on the one hand, and American arrogance and desire for global dictatorship and hegemony on the other. Other commmentators posit that Iran needs an "external bogeyman" to "furnish a pretext for domestic repression" against reformist factions, and to bind the Iranian government to its "small but loyal and heavily armed constituency".
Venezuela	9 August 1950	See Iran–Venezuela relations Both countries established diplomatic relations on 9 August 1950. Venezuela's former president, Hugo Chávez and Iran's former president Mahmoud Ahmadinejad have both described themselves on the world stage as opposed to US imperialism. Citing this commonality of opinion, they regard each other as allies, and they have embarked on a number of initiatives together. For example, on 6 January 2007, the two announced that they would use some money from a previously announced $2 billion joint fund to invest in other countries that were "attempting to liberate themselves from the imperialist yoke", in Chávez's words. The two presidents declared an "axis of unity" against "US imperialism".
Chile	May 1991	See Chile–Iran relations Both countries established diplomatic relations in May 1991.: Chile has an embassy in Tehran.; Iran has an embassy in Santiago.

=== Asia ===
Country	Formal relations began	Notes
Afghanistan	2 May 1920	See Afghanistan–Iran relations Both countries established diplomatic relations on 2 May 1920 when has been accredited first Envoy Extraordinary and Minister Plenipotentiary of Afghanistan to Persia Sardar Abdol Aziz Khan. Afghanistan's relations with Iran have fluctuated in modern times, due to the Taliban's control of the country in the 1990s, the thousands of illegal Afghan immigrants and refugees in Iran, and with occasional disputes about water rights over the Helmand River. Also, Iran has been accused of supporting the Taliban many times from legitimizing it by entertaining the Taliban's delegates to supplying them with arms and even training them. Afghan migrants and refugees have been systematically harassed, abused, and killed by the Iranian government. Iran is situated along one of the main trafficking routes for cannabis, heroin, opium and morphine produced in Afghanistan, and 'designer drugs' have also found their way into the local market in recent years. Iran's police said in April 2009 that 7,700 tonnes of opium were produced in Afghanistan in 2008, of which 3000 tonnes entered Iran, adding that the force had managed to seize 1000 tonnes of the smuggled opium.
Armenia	9 February 1992	See Armenia–Iran relations Both countries established diplomatic relations on 9 February 1992. Despite religious and ideological differences, relations between Armenia and the Islamic Republic of Iran remain cordial and both Armenia and Iran are strategic partners in the region. The two neighbouring countries share to a great extent similar history and culture, and have had relations for thousands of years, starting with the Median Empire. Both countries have Indo-European national languages, and Armenian and Persian have influenced each other. Iran only lost the territory that nowadays comprises Armenia in the course of the 19th century, by the Russo-Persian Wars, irrevocably to neighbouring Imperial Russia. There are no border disputes between the two countries and the Christian Armenian minority in Iran, amongst the largest and oldest communities in the world, and the largest in the Middle East, enjoys official recognition. Of special importance is the cooperation in the field of energy security which lowers Armenia's dependence on Russia and can in the future also supply Iranian gas to Europe through Georgia and the Black Sea.: Armenia has an embassy in Tehran.; Iran has an embassy in Yerevan and a consulate-general in Kapan.
Azerbaijan	12 March 1992	See Azerbaijan–Iran relations Both countries established diplomatic relations on 12 March 1992. The people of Azerbaijan and Iran share a long and complex relationship, resulting in deep historical, religious and cultural ties. The largest population of ethnic Azerbaijanis live in Iran and until 1813/1828, the soil of the modern-day Republic of Azerbaijan was Iranian territory, prior to being forcefully ceded to Russia by the Treaty of Gulistan of 1813 and the Treaty of Turkmenchay of 1828. Both nations are the only officially majority-Shia nations in the world as well, and have the highest and second highest Shia populations in the world by percentage. Azerbaijan has an embassy in Tehran. and a consulate-general in Tabriz. Iran has an embassy in Baku. and a consulate-general in Nakhchivan. Both countries are full members of the Economic Cooperation Organization (ECO) and the Organisation of Islamic Cooperation (OIC).
Bahrain	29 August 1971 (Diplomatic relations severed 4 January 2016)	See Bahrain–Iran relations Both countries established diplomatic relations on 29 August 1971. Bahrain severed diplomatic ties on 4 January 2016 after the attack on the Saudi diplomatic missions in Iran.
Bangladesh	21 June 1974	See Bangladesh–Iran relations Both countries established diplomatic relations on 21 June 1974 when Bangladesh an embassy was established in Iran and on 24 January 1975 Irans embassy was also established in Bangladesh. Bangladesh and Iran signed a preferential trade accord in July 2006 which removed non-tariff barriers, with a view to eventually establishing a free-trade agreement. Before the signing of the accord, bilateral trade between the countries amounted to US$100 million annually. In mid-2007, the Bangladeshi government requested Iran's help with the construction of a nuclear power plant, in order to offset the decline in the availability of gas for power generation. The Bangladeshi Minister of Power, Energy and Natural Resources also requested Iranian assistance for the construction of new oil refineries in Bangladesh.
China	16 August 1971	See China–Iran relations Both countries established diplomatic relations on 16 August 1971. Countries which signed cooperation documents related to the Belt and Road Initiative. Iran continues to align itself politically with the People's Republic of China as the European Union and United States push forward with policies to isolate Iran both politically and economically. Iran has observer status at the Shanghai Cooperation Organisation and aspires to membership in this body, in which China plays a leading role. In July 2004, Iranian parliamentary speaker Gholam Ali Haddad-Adel stressed China's support for Iran's nuclear programs. China's Foreign Minister Li Zhaoxing also said that his country opposes Iran being referred to the United Nations Security Council over its nuclear program, and claimed that the 7 April 1980 government had a very positive attitude in its cooperation with the IAEA. China and Iran have developed a friendly economic and strategic partnership. China is believed to have helped Iran militarily in the following areas: conduct training of high-level officials on advanced systems, provide technical support, supply specialty steel for missile construction, provide control technology for missile development, build a missile factory and test range. It is rumored that China is responsible for aiding in the development of advanced conventional weapons including surface-to-air missiles, combat aircraft, radar systems, and fast-attack missile vessels.
Georgia	15 May 1992	See Georgia–Iran relations, Persia–Georgia relations Both countries established diplomatic relations on 15 May 1992. Iran and Georgia have had relations for hundreds of years. Georgia, throughout its history, has several times been annexed by the Persian Empire, specifically under the Achaemenid, Parthian, Sassanid, and Safavid dynasties. Accordingly, there has been a lot of political and cultural exchange, and Georgia was often considered a part of Greater Iran. Iran and Georgia, or the Georgian kingdoms, have had relations in different forms, beginning with trade in the Achaemenid era. The relationship got more complex as the Safavids took power in Iran and attempted to maintain Iranian control of the Georgian kingdoms. This continued until the 19th century when Russia, through the Russo-Persian War (1804–13) and Russo-Persian War (1826–1828), took the Caucasus from the Qajars, and thus Iran irrevocably lost the whole region, including Georgia. In the early 20th century, Iran–Georgian relations were merged into Iran–Soviet relations. Since Georgia's independence from the Soviet Union, the two nations have cooperated in many fields including energy, transport, trade, education, and science. Iran is one of Georgia's most important trading partners and an Intergovernmental Joint Economic Commission is functioning between the two countries.
India	15 March 1950	See India–Iran relations Both countries established diplomatic relations on 15 March 1950. After the Iranian Revolution of 1979, Iran withdrew from CENTO and dissociated itself from US-friendly countries during the Cold War. The two countries currently have friendly relations in many areas. There are significant trade ties, particularly in crude-oil imports into India and diesel exports to Iran. Iran objected to Pakistan's attempts to draft anti-India resolutions at international organizations such as the OIC in 1994. Reciprocally, India supported Iran's inclusion as an observer state in the South Asian Association for Regional Cooperation. In the 1990s, India and Iran both supported the Northern Alliance in Afghanistan against the Taliban regime. India and Iran have had relations for millennia. With the growth of India's strategic and economic ties with the United States and the West in recent years, there have been instances of marked differences in diplomatic stances of the two countries on core issues. Specifically, India has twice voted against Iran in the IAEA in 2005 and 2009, calling on Iran to halt its nuclear weapons programme. as well as abstained on a key UN General Assembly resolution condemning Iran for its involvement in an alleged plot to assassinate the Saudi envoy to Washington. Although India voiced support for Iran after it attacked Jaish al Adl terrorist camps in Pakistan's Balochistan Province in January 2024.
Indonesia	1950	See Indonesia–Iran relations Both countries established diplomatic relations in 1950. Iranian Foreign Minister Mohammad Javad Zarif and his Indonesian counterpart Retno Marsudi held a meeting in the Iranian capital of Tehran. Indonesia and Iran are Muslim majority countries, despite the differences in its religious orientation. Indonesia has the largest Muslim Sunni population, while Iran is the largest Shiite nation. As Islamic countries that have among the largest Muslim populations in the world, Iran and Indonesia hold themselves responsible for promoting Islam as a peaceful religion. Diplomatic relations have continued since 1950. Indonesia has an embassy in Tehran, and Iran has an embassy in Jakarta. Both countries are full members of the World Trade Organization (WTO), The Non-Aligned Movement, Organisation of Islamic Cooperation (OIC), and Developing 8 Countries. Jakarta had offered to help mediate the Iranian nuclear dispute, Jakarta is on good terms with Iran and other Middle East countries, as well as with the West.
Iraq	25 April 1929	See Iran–Iraq relations Both countries established diplomatic relations on 25 April 1929 when Iran formally recognized Iraq and appointed a diplomatic representative to Baghdad. Iran–Iraq relations have been turbulent since the Iran–Iraq War began in 1988. They have improved since the fall of Saddam Hussein in 2003. Mahmoud Ahmadinejad was the first Iranian president to visit Iraq since Iran's 1979 Islamic revolution. Iran has an embassy in Baghdad and three consulates-general, in Sulaimaniya, Erbil, and Karbala. Iraq has an embassy in Tehran, and three Consulate-Generals in Ahwaz, Kermanshah, and Mashad.
Israel	1950 (Diplomatic relations severed in 1979)	See Iran–Israel relations, History of the Jews in Iran, Iran–Israel proxy conflict In 1947, Iran voted against the United Nations Partition Plan for Palestine and recognized Israel three years later. Under the Shah Mohammad Reza Pahlavi Iran and Israel enjoyed a high degree of diplomatic relations. Following the Iranian Revolution in 1979, the two states become hostile and the current Iranian government does not recognize the existence of Israel. The back covers of Iranian passports read: "The holder of this passport is not entitled to travel to occupied Palestine". Both countries have severed their diplomatic and commercial ties with each other. Iran does not recognize Israel and refers to it as a Zionist entity or a Zionist regime.
Japan	4 August 1929	See Iran–Japan relations Both countries established diplomatic relations on 4 August 1929 when It was stated in Teheran that the Japanese Government had decided to establish a Legation there. Throughout history, the two countries have maintained a relatively friendly and strongly strategic partnership.
Kazakhstan	29 January 1992	See Iran–Kazakhstan relations Both countries established diplomatic relations on 29 January 1992. Trade turnover between the two countries increased fivefold between 2003-2009, from $400 million in 2003 to more than $2 billion in 2009. Iran imports grain, petroleum products, and metals from Kazakhstan. Iran is a partner in joint oil and gas projects including construction of a pipeline connecting Kazakhstan and Turkmenistan with Iran's (Persian Gulf) which will give Astana access to the Asian markets. Kazakhstan is specially interested in Iranian investment in mechanical engineering, infrastructure, transport, and telecommunications.
Kuwait	17 December 1961	See Iran–Kuwait relations Both countries established diplomatic relations on 17 December 1961.: Iran has an embassy in Kuwait City.; Kuwait has an embassy in Tehran.
Kyrgyzstan	10 May 1992	See Iran–Kyrgyzstan relations Both countries established diplomatic relations on 10 May 1992. Iran and Kyrgyzstan have signed agreements on cooperation in the spheres of transport, customs, trade, and economic relations. Iran and Kyrgyzstan interact in the spheres of education, culture, travel, customs, finances, and the war on trafficking and crime in general. The two countries trade in agriculture and capital goods. In 2008, Iran promised Kyrgyzstan €200 million for some economic projects. Iranian companies participated in construction of a highway connecting Bishkek and Osh. Iran and Kyrgyzstan hope to increase their annual trade turnover to $100 million.
Lebanon	21 September 1944	See Iran–Lebanon relations Both countries established diplomatic relations on 21 September 1944. Around June 1982, Iran dispatched more than 1000 Revolutionary Guards to the predominantly Shi'ite Bekaa Valley of Lebanon. There they established themselves, taking over the Lebanese Army's regional headquarters in the Sheikh Abdullah barracks, as well as a modern clinic, renamed "Hospital Khomeini", and the Hotel Khayyam. The Pasdaran were active in many places, including schools, where they propagated Islamic doctrine. Iranian clerics, most notably Fazlollah Mahallati, supervised. From this foothold, the Islamic Republic helped organize one of its biggest successes, the Hezbollah militia, a party and social-services organization devoted to the Khomeini principle of Guardianship (i.e. rule) of the Islamic Jurists (Velayat-e-Faqih), and loyal to Khomeini as their leader. Over the next seven years Iran is estimated to have spent $5 to $10 million US per month on Hezbollah, although the organization is now said to have become more self-sufficient. In the words of Hussein Musawi, a former commander of Amal militia who joined Hezbollah: We are her [Iran's] children. We are seeking to formulate an Islamic society which in the final analysis will produce an Islamic state. ... The Islamic revolution will march to liberate Palestine and Jerusalem, and the Islamic state will then spread its authority over the region of which Lebanon is only a part. United Nations Security Council Resolution 1559 (2 September 2004) called for the "disbanding and disarmament of all Lebanese and non-Lebanese militias". The Government of Lebanon is responsible for the implementation, and for preventing the flow of armaments and other military equipment to the militias, yet including Hezbollah, from Syria, Iran, and other external sources. On August 5, 2025, a Lebanese government meeting was held in Baabda Palace focused on the disarmament of Hezbollah. At the end of the meeting the Lebanese Army was assigned to present a plan for the disarmament of Hezbollah and returning state monopoly over arms. Surrounding the discussions on the disarmament of Hezbollah, Ali Larijani met with Lebanese President Joseph Aoun in Beirut. During the meeting, Aoun insisted that only the Lebanese state had the right to bear arms, expressing that "no armed group is permitted to act outside state authority". In response, Larijani replied that Iran "respects Lebanese sovereignty", but he criticized U.S. influence on Lebanon’s disarmament push and defended Hezbollah as a legitimate resistance against Israel. After meeting with Larijani, President Aoun emphasized Lebanon’s stance on sovereignty, saying that the language from some Iranian officials is unhelpful. "We reject any interference in our internal affairs by any entity and we want Lebanon to remain safe and stable". On August 7, 2025, Iran's Foreign Minister Abbas Araghchi spoke against Lebanon’s decision to disarm Hezbollah, stating that it will surely fail, as Hezbollah is strong and has Iran’s commitment to it. Lebanese officials were outraged by his comments, causing Foreign Minister Youssef Rajji to summon Iran's ambassador making note that the comments are an unacceptable interference in Lebanon’s internal affairs. Other Lebanese politicians like MP Ghayath Yazbeck went even further, calling for a UN complaint over what they described as an attack on Lebanon’s sovereignty.
Malaysia		See Iran–Malaysia relations In January 2017, the two countries are set to pursue a free trade agreement. A memorandum of understanding (MoU) on gas field study was signed in February between National Iranian Oil Company (NIOC) and Malaysia's Bukhary International Ventures (BIV). Both countries have integrated their banking transactions and also agreed to use local currencies along with Chinese yuan and Japanese yen in their bilateral trade. As of 2015, there are around 5,000 Iranian students in Malaysia, while only 15 Malaysian students in Iran.
North Korea	15 April 1973	See Iran – North Korea relations Both countries established diplomatic relations on 15 April 1973. Iran – North Korea relations are described as being positive by official news agencies of the two countries. They have pledged cooperation in the educational, scientific, and cultural spheres. North Korea also assisted Iran in its nuclear program. Iran and North Korea have close relations due to their shared hostility towards the United States, who designated both nations as state sponsors of terrorism and part of the Axis of evil.
Oman		See Iran–Oman relations Relations between Oman and Iran date back centuries. Oman has maintained relations with Iran, and each country maintains an embassy in the other's capital. and Sultan Qaboos played a key role in the Iran nuclear deal.
Pakistan	23 August 1947	See Iran–Pakistan relations Both countries established diplomatic relations on 23 August 1947 when Pakistan and Iran have agreed to exchange diplomatic representatives. Iran was the first nation to recognize Pakistan's independence. During the Indo-Pakistani War of 1965 and Indo-Pakistani War of 1971, Iran supported Pakistan under the reign of Shah Mohammad Reza Pahlavi and opened the Iran-Pakistan border to provide fuel and arms to the Pakistani soldiers. After the 1971 war Iran tried to strengthen its ties with Pakistan's arch rival India. The Shah of Iran planned to annex the Balochistan province as Pakistan would surrender after a loss of the 1971 war. Following the Iranian revolution of 1979, Pakistan started having close relations with Saudi Arabia. Their relations are complex, driven by Pakistani geo-political aspirations, religious affiliations, Iran's relations with India, and internal and external factors.
Palestine		See Iran–Palestine relations The Islamic Republic of Iran (established after the 1979 Iranian Revolution) closed the Israeli embassy in Tehran and replaced it with a Palestinian embassy. Iran favours a Palestinian state and officially endorses the replacement of Israel with a unitary Palestinian state or whatever choice the Palestinian people decide through a democratic vote. In a 2006 interview, Mohammad Khatami said Iran has also stated its willingness to accept a two-state solution if the Palestinians find this acceptable. The Iranian government regularly sends aid to various Palestinian causes, everything from transporting injured children to hospitals to supplying the Palestinian Islamist militant groups Islamic Jihad and Hamas with arms. Streets and squares named after Palestinians crisscross the nation. Several Palestinian militant resistance groups, including Hamas, are Iranian allies. The Iranian government also gives substantial assistance to the Hamas government in Gaza, which is embargoed by Israel, and depends on outside sources for an estimated 90% of its budget. Iranian support is not unconditional. In July and August 2011 Iran cut funding to show its displeasure at "Hamas's failure to hold public rallies in support" of Syrian President Bashar al-Assad during the Syrian Civil War. In part for this reason, Hamas was unable to pay July salaries of its "40,000 civil service and security employees."
Philippines	22 January 1964	See Iran–Philippines relations Both countries established diplomatic relations on 22 January 1964. Iran has an embassy in Manila, while the Philippines has an embassy in Tehran.
Qatar	16 October 1971	See Iran–Qatar relations Both countries established diplomatic relations on 16 October 1971.: Iran has an embassy in Doha.; Qatar has an embassy in Tehran.
Saudi Arabia	24 August 1929	See Iran–Saudi Arabia relations and Iran–Saudi Arabia proxy conflict Both countries established diplomatic relations on 24 August 1929. Due to various political and cultural clashes throughout history, relations between the two nations have been greatly strained. In 1966 King Faisal of Saudi Arabia visited Iran with the aim of further strengthening the relationships between the countries. The Shah (King) of Iran reciprocated by paying an official visit to Saudi Arabia, which eventually led to a peaceful resolution of a dispute concerning the islands of Farsi and Arabi: it was agreed that Farsi would belong to Iran and Arabi would be under the control of Saudi Arabia. A unique feature of this agreement is that it assigned only territorial waters to the islands, not the continental shelf. In 1968, when Great Britain announced its withdrawal from the Persian Gulf, Iran and Saudi Arabia took the primary responsibility for peace and security in the region. During the 1970s, Saudi Arabia's main bilateral concerns were Iran's modernization of its military, which was capable of dominating the entire region, and Iran's repossession of the Islands of Big Tunb, Little Tunb and Abu Moussa in 1971, challenging the United Arab Emirates' claim to the Islands. Despite these frictions, the friendliness of Iran–Saudi Arabia relations reached a peak in the period between 1968 and 1979. After the Iranian Revolution in 1979, Khomeini and other Iranian leaders openly attacked and criticized the character and religious legitimacy of the Saudi regime. According to Le Figaro, on 5 June 2010 King Abdullah of Saudi Arabia told Hervé Morin, the Defense Minister of France, "There are two countries in the world that do not deserve to exist: Iran and Israel." On 3 January 2016, Saudi Arabia severed diplomatic relations with Iran. Iran and Saudi Arabia restored relations in 2023.
Singapore	6 August 1973	Both countries established diplomatic relations on 6 August 1973. Singapore and Iran maintain cordial relations, despite Singapore's close relationship with the United States. The island city state and Iran have conducted numerous cultural exchanges as well as a high expatriate Iranian population living in Singapore.
South Korea	23 October 1962	See Iran–South Korea relations Both countries established diplomatic relations on 23 October 1962. Iran–South Korea relations are described as being positive despite Iran's close relationship with North Korea, and South Korea's with the United States. The two countries have maintained a relatively friendly and strongly strategic partnership. South Korea is one of Iran's major commercial partners.
Sri Lanka	1961	See Iran–Sri Lanka relations Iran and Sri Lanka have had official diplomatic relations since 1961. Diplomatic relations between Iran and Sri Lanka (then known as Ceylon) began in 1961 via the Ceylonese embassy in Islamabad, which was the closest Ceylon had to a presence on Iranian soil until the opening of the Tehran embassy office in 1990. Tehran set up its Colombo office in 1975. After Mahmoud Ahmadinejad became President of Iran, Sri Lanka was the first country he visited on his inaugural Asian tour. Mahinda Rajapaksa also made ties with Iran a priority after he ascended to office.
Syria	12 November 1946	See Iran–Syria relations Both countries established diplomatic relations on 12 November 1946 when has been accredited Envoy Extraordinary and Plenipotentiary of Iran to Syria with residence in Beirut Mr. Zein-el-Abdine Rahnema. Syria was one of the few Arab countries to support Iran during the Iran–Iraq War, putting them at odds with other nations in the Arab League. Iran and Syria have had a strategic alliance ever since, partially due to their common animosity towards Saddam Hussein and coordination against the United States and Israel. Syria and Iran cooperate on arms smuggling from Iran to Hezbollah in Lebanon, which borders Israel. Iran was reported as helping Syria to suppress the anti-government protests that broke out in 2011 with training, munitions and high-tech surveillance technology. The Guardian reported in May 2011 that the Iranian Republican Guard increased its "level of technical support and personnel support" to strengthen Syria's "ability to deal with protesters", according to one diplomat in Damascus. Iran reportedly assisted the Syrian government sending it riot control equipment, intelligence monitoring techniques and oil. It also agreed to fund a large military base at Latakia airport. The Daily Telegraph has claimed in August that a former member of Syria's secret police reported "Iranian snipers" had been deployed in Syria to assist in the crackdown on protests. According to the US government, Mohsen Chizari, the Quds Force's third-in-command, has visited Syria to train security services to fight against the protestors. On 24 June 2011 The EU's official journal said the three Iranian Revolutionary Guard members now subject to sanctions had been "providing equipment and support to help the Syrian regime suppress protests in Syria". The Iranians added to the EU sanctions list were two Revolutionary Guard commanders, Soleimani and Brig Cmdr Mohammad Ali Jafari, and the Guard's deputy commander for intelligence, Hossein Taeb.
Thailand	9 November 1955	See Iran–Thailand relations Both countries established diplomatic relations on 9 November 1955.: Iran has an embassy in Bangkok.; Thailand maintains an embassy in Tehran.
Turkey	1835	See Iran–Turkey relations Both countries established diplomatic relations in 1835. A period of coolness passed after the 1979 Iranian Revolution, which caused major changes in Iran and the world's status quo. Today Iran and Turkey cooperate in a wide variety of fields that range from fighting terrorism and drug trafficking, and promoting stability in Iraq and Central Asia. Iran and Turkey also have very close trade and economic relations. Both countries are part of the Economic Cooperation Organization (ECO). Turkey receives about 2 million Iranian tourists each year, and benefits economically from Iranian tourism. Bilateral trade between the nations is increasing. In 2005, bilateral trade increased to $4 billion from $1 billion in 2000. Iran's gas exports to Turkey are likely to increase. Turkey imports about 10 billion cubic meters a year of gas from Iran, about thirty percent of its needs. Turkey plans to invest $12 billion in developing phases 22, 23, and 24 of the South Pars gas field, a senior Iranian oil official told Shana.ir. Half of this gas will be re-exported to Europe. Two-way trade is now in the range of $10 billion (2008), and both governments have announced that the figure should reach the $20 billion mark in the not-too-distant future. Turkey won the tender for privatization of the Razi Petrochemical Complex, valued at $650 million (2008). Since the 2016 Turkish coup d'état attempt, the two states began close co-operation especially on the 2017–18 Qatar diplomatic crisis.: Iran has an embassy in Ankara and consulates-general in Erzurum, Istanbul and Trabzon.; Turkey has an embassy in Tehran and consulates-general in Mashhad, Tabriz and Urmia.; If Turkey becomes a member of the European Union, Iran will become a border neighbor of the European Union.
Turkmenistan	18 February 1992	See Iran–Turkmenistan relations Both countries established diplomatic relations on 18 February 1992. Iran and Turkmenistan have had relations since the latter's separation from the former Soviet Union in 1991. Iran was the first nation to recognize Turkmenistan's independence. Since then, the two countries have enjoyed good relations and have cooperated in the economic, infrastructure, and energy sectors. Trade between the two nations surpasses $1 billion and Iranians are the second-largest buyers of Turkmen commodities, mainly natural gas. The $139-million Korpeje-Kurt Kui gas pipeline in western Turkmenistan and the $167-million Dousti ("Friendship" in Persian) Dam in the south of the country were built through a joint venture. Their Caspian Sea territorial boundaries are a cause of tension between the two countries. Iran's Islamic theocracy and Turkmenistan's secular dictatorship also prevent the development of a closer friendship.
United Arab Emirates	28 October 1972	See Iran–United Arab Emirates relations Both countries established diplomatic relations on 28 October 1972: Iran has an embassy in Abu Dhabi and a consulate-general in Dubai.; United Arab Emirates has an embassy in Tehran. The embassy is administered by a Chargés d'affaires en pied.; Iran and United Arab Emirates both claim three islands in the Persian Gulf (Abu Musa, Greater Tunb, and Lesser Tunb).
Uzbekistan	10 May 1992	See Iran–Uzbekistan relations Both countries established diplomatic relations on 10 May 1992. The two countries have deep cultural and historical ties that date back to several centuries. Iran has been especially been active in pursuing economic projects and social, cultural, and diplomatic initiatives in Uzbekistan. The two nations have also worked on overland links and other joint ventures. Although the differences between their political systems, Iran's Islamic theocracy and Uzbekistan's presidential constitutional republic, keep the two nations apprehensive, it has not deterred them from further improving relations. Iran and Uzbekistan agreed to develop cooperation in agriculture, transport, oil and gas production, construction, production of pharmaceuticals, and banking. The state visit of Uzbekistan's President Shavkat Mirziyoyev to Iran in 2023 marked the beginning of a new phase of cooperation between the two nations. During the visit, a total of 15 agreements were signed, further strengthening bilateral ties. Notably, this visit led to the establishment of direct flights between Tehran and Samarkand, facilitating enhanced connectivity and promoting closer relations between the two cities.
Vietnam	4 August 1973	See Iran–Vietnam relations Both countries established diplomatic relations on 4 August 1973.: Iran has an embassy in Hanoi.; Vietnam has an embassy in Tehran.

=== Europe ===
Country	Formal relations began	Notes
Albania	1990 (Diplomatic relations severed 7 September 2022)	See Albania–Iran relations: As for the result of Albania's alignment with the United States after the 1990s, the relations between the two countries remain poor. Albania's decision to welcome People's Mujahedin of Iran taking refuge in the country led to further deterioration of Albanian–Iranian relations.; On 7 September 2022, Albania severed diplomatic ties with Iran over cyberattacks.
Austria	4 September 1872	Both countries established diplomatic relations on 4 September 1872 when has been accredited first Envoy Extraordinary and Minister Plenipotentiary of Austria to Persia Graf Victor Dubsky.: Austria has an embassy in Tehran.; Iran has an embassy in Vienna.
Belarus	18 March 1993	See Belarus–Iran relations Both countries established diplomatic relations on 18 March 1993. Belarus has an embassy in Tehran; Iran has an embassy in Minsk. The two countries have enjoyed good relations in recent years, reflected in regular high-level meetings and various agreements. In 2008, Belarusian Foreign Minister Sergei Martynov described Iran as an important partner of his country in the region and the world. Both Iran and Belarus are allies of Russia.
Bulgaria	15 November 1897	See Bulgaria–Iran relations Both countries established diplomatic relations on 15 November 1897. Bulgaria has had an embassy in Tehran since 1939. Iran has an embassy in Sofia.
Croatia	18 April 1992	See Croatia–Iran relations Both countries established diplomatic relations on 18 April 1992. Croatia has an embassy in Tehran; Iran maintains an embassy and a cultural centre in Zagreb. Iran was the seventh country to recognize the newly independent Croatia. The Croatian national oil company INA is active in the Ardabil Province. Iranian vice-president Hassan Habibi visited Croatia in 1995. Croatian president Stipe Mesić had a three-day state visit to Iran in 2001. In 2008 Iranian president Mahmoud Ahmadinejad hailed the two countries' relations and said that their shared cultures and histories, owing to the possible Iranian origin of the Croats, would strengthen those relations.: Croatian Ministry of Foreign Affairs: list of bilateral treaties with Iran
Czech Republic	22 June 1925	See Czech Republic–Iran relations. Both countries established diplomatic relations on 22 June 1925. Czech firms mainly export machinery products, electrical goods, and other products to Iran while the bulk of imports from Iran consists of fruit and vegetables (2014).: the Czech Republic has an embassy in Tehran.; Iran has an embassy in Prague.
Denmark	3 February 1922	See Denmark–Iran relations Both countries established diplomatic relations on 3 February 1922 when has been accredited first Persian Envoy Extraordinary and Minister Plenipotentiary to Denmark with residence in Stockholm Mirza Abdol Ghaffar Khan Emad-ol-Molk. The first Iranian envoy to Denmark arrived in 1691 in order to negotiate the release of the Iranian-owned cargo of a Bengali ship seized by the Danish fleet. The Iranian diplomat had been issued with diplomatic credentials by Suleiman I of Persia (Shah 1666–1694) and opened negotiations with King Christian V of Denmark. He was unable to secure the release of the cargo. In 1933, a Danish consulate was established in Tehran, and later upgraded to an embassy. Following a state visit in 1958, Iran established an embassy in Copenhagen. The Muhammad cartoons controversy of 2006 saw the Danish embassy to Iran attacked by protesters and the Iranian Ambassador to Denmark called to Tehran, straining political and economic interaction between the two countries.: Denmark has an embassy in Tehran.; Iran has an embassy in Copenhagen.; Encyclopedia Iranica on Iran-Denmark historical relations
Finland	12 December 1931	See Finland–Iran relations Both countries established diplomatic relations on 12 December 1931.: Finland has an embassy in Tehran.; Iran has an embassy in Helsinki. In 2010 an Iranian diplomat stationed in Finland applied for political asylum in that country.
France	13 August 1715	See France–Iran relations Both countries established diplomatic relations on 13 August 1715. Iran has generally enjoyed a friendly relationship with France since the Middle Ages. The travels of Jean-Baptiste Tavernier are particularly well known to Safavid Persia. Relations soured over Iran's refusal to halt uranium enrichment and France supporting the referral of Iran to the United Nations Security Council. Relations between France and Iran remained friendly under Jacques Chirac's presidency.: France has an embassy in Tehran.
Germany	11 June 1873	See Germany–Iran relations Both countries established diplomatic relations on 11 June 1873. Official diplomatic relations between Iran and post-war Germany began in 1952 when Iran opened its first mission office in Bonn. It and Persia had prior diplomatic relations from the 19th century.: Germany has an embassy in Tehran.; Iran has an embassy in Berlin.
Greece	19 November 1902	See Greece–Iran relations Both countries established diplomatic relations on 19 November 1902 when the first Persian Ambassador to Greece was appointed: Greece has an embassy in Tehran.; Iran has an embassy in Athens.
Holy See	2 May 1953	See Holy See–Iran relations Both countries established diplomatic relations on 2 May 1953. The Holy See and Iran have had formal diplomatic relations since 1953, under the pontificate of Pius XII, which have been maintained even during the most difficult periods of the Islamic revolution.
Hungary		See Hungary–Iran relations: Hungary has an embassy in Tehran.; Iran has an embassy in Budapest.
Ireland	17 February 1976	Both countries established diplomatic relations on 17 February 1976. Iran has an embassy in Dublin; Ireland closed its embassy in Tehran along with several others due to the severity of the Irish government's financial difficulties on 23 February 2012.
Italy	18 February 1886	See Iran–Italy relations Both countries established diplomatic relations on 18 February 1886 when has been appointed first Chargé d'Affaires of Italy to Persia Alessandro De Rege Di Donato. Iran-Italy trade stood at US$2.7 billion in 2001 and €3.852 billion in 2003. In 2005, Italy was Iran's third-largest trading partner, contributing 7.5% of all exports to Iran. Italy was Iran's top European Union trading partner in early 2006. Commercial exchanges hit €6 billion in 2008. Still, Iran considers Italy one of its "important trade partners" indicated by Italy's "presence in [the] Tehran International Book Fair" and the desire of Italian companies to economically cooperate with Iran.: Iran has an embassy in Rome.; Italy has an embassy in Tehran.
Netherlands	5 January 1883	See Iran-Netherlands relations Both countries established diplomatic relations on 5 January 1883 when Mirza Jawad Khan, Persian Minister in Belgium, was also accredited to the Netherlands.: Iran has an embassy in The Hague.; the Netherlands has an embassy in Tehran.
Norway	14 October 1908	Both countries established diplomatic relations on 14 October 1908. An Iranian diplomat stationed in Norway was granted political asylum by that country in February 2010. In September 2010, an Iranian diplomat stationed in Belgium also applied for political asylum in Norway. Following the 2011 attack on the British Embassy in Iran, Norway announced that it has closed its embassy in Tehran due to security concerns, after Britain's mission was stormed. Hilde Steinfeld, a Foreign Ministry spokeswoman in Oslo, said the decision to close the embassy was taken late Tuesday, but that Norway's diplomatic staff have not been evacuated from the country. "They're still in Tehran," she said. As of early 2026, while the Norwegian government's own website lists the embassy as active, third-party directories report no Norwegian diplomatic presence in Tehran and refer to the Consulate in Yerevan, Armenia.
Poland	19 March 1927	See Iran–Poland relations Both countries established diplomatic relations on 19 March 1927.: Iran has an embassy in Warsaw.; Poland has an embassy in Tehran.
Portugal	15 October 1956	See Iran–Portugal relations Both countries established diplomatic relations on 15 October 1956 when Envoy Extraordinary and Minister Plenipotentiary of Portugal with residence in Ankara, Luís Norton de Mato, presented his credentials as non resident to Iran.: Iran has an embassy in Lisbon.; Portugal has an embassy in Tehran.
Romania	24 July 1902	See Iran–Romania relations Both countries established diplomatic relations on 24 July 1902. Iran has an embassy in Bucharest; Romania has an embassy in Tehran. They exchanged ambassadors for the first time in 1922.
Russia		See Iran–Russia relations Iran's Supreme Leader Ali Khamenei and President Ebrahim Raisi with Russian President Vladimir Putin, 19 July 2022 Relations between Russia and Persia (pre-1935 Iran) have a long history, as they officially commenced in 1521 with the Safavids in power. Past and present contact between Russia and Iran has always been complicated and multi-faceted, often wavering between collaboration and rivalry. The two nations have a long history of geographic, economic, and socio-political interaction. Their mutual relations have often been turbulent, and dormant at other times. Since 2019, their relationship has drastically improved and Russia and Iran are now strategic allies and form an axis in the Caucasus alongside Armenia. Iran has its embassy in Moscow and consulate generals in the cities of Kazan and Astrakhan. Russia has its embassy in Tehran, and consulate generals in the cities of Rasht and Isfahan. Both also supported the Assad government in Syria. Even so, on 24 August 2025, after the Twelve-Day War, Mohammad Sadr, a member of Iran’s Expediency Discernment Council, accused Russia of disclosing the locations of Iranian air defence systems to Israel, adding further that the strategic alliance with Moscow was "worthless".
Serbia	30 April 1937	See Iran–Serbia relations Both countries established diplomatic relations on 30 April 1937. Iran has an embassy in Belgrade; Serbia has an embassy in Tehran. Serbia shares the same Eastern Orthodox heritage with Russia. Historians have stated that it is remotely possible that Serbs historically originated from the early Persian tribes in the Caucasus. Iran has supported Serbia's territorial integrity by not recognizing Kosovo as a state.: Serbian Ministry of Foreign Affairs about relations with Iran
Spain	4 March 1842	See Iran–Spain relations Both countries established diplomatic relations on 4 March 1842.: Iran has an embassy in Madrid.; Spain has an embassy in Tehran.
Sweden	5 September 1897	See Iran–Sweden relations Both countries established diplomatic relations on 5 September 1897 when has been accredited first Envoy Extraordinary and Minister Plenipotentiary of Persia to Sweden with residence in St. Peterbourg Mirza Reza Khan Ar Faed-Doouleh.: Iran has an embassy in Stockholm.; Sweden has an embassy in Tehran.
Switzerland	4 March 1919	See Iran–Switzerland relations Both countries established diplomatic relations on 4 March 1919 when has been accredited first Persian Envoy Extraordinary and Minister Plenipotentiary to Switzerland Zoka-ed-Dovleh.
Ukraine	22 January 1992	See Iran–Ukraine relations Both countries established diplomatic relations on 22 January 1992.
United Kingdom	4 January 1801	See Iran–United Kingdom relations British Prime Minister Theresa May with Irani President Hassan Rouhani at a United Nations General Assembly in New York City, September 2016. Iran established diplomatic relations with the United Kingdom on 4 January 1801.: Iran maintains an embassy in London.; The United Kingdom is accredited to Iran through its embassy in Tehran.; The UK governed southern Iran from 1941 until 1946. Both countries share common membership of the United Nations. Bilaterally the two countries have an Air Transport Agreement. The Herald Tribune reported on 22 January 2006 a rise in British exports to Iran, from £296 million in 2000 to £443.8 million in 2004. A spokesperson for UK Trade and Investment was quoted to say "Iran has become more attractive because it now pursues a more liberal economic policy." In 2011, the UK together with the United States and Canada, issued sanctions on Iran following controversy over the country's nuclear program. As a result, Iranian government's Guardian Council approved a parliamentary bill expelling the British ambassador. On 29 November 2011, two compounds of the British embassy in Tehran were stormed by Iranian protesters. They smashed windows, ransacked offices, set fire to government documents, and burned a British flag. As part of the UK's response to this incident the Secretary of State for Foreign and Commonwealth Affairs, William Hague, announced on 30 November 2011 that the United Kingdom had shut the embassy in Tehran and recalled all diplomatic staff. The Iranian chargé d'affaires in London was simultaneously instructed to immediately close the Iranian embassy in London and given a 48-hour ultimatum for all staff to leave the UK. Foreign Secretary Boris Johnson with Ali Shamkhani, 10 May 2017 On Tuesday 17 June 2014 the Secretary of State for Foreign and Commonwealth Affairs, William Hague, announced that the UK embassy would re-open "as soon as practical arrangements are made". On the same day David Cameron, the UK Prime Minister said he is committed to "rebuilding" diplomatic relations with Iran but will proceed with a "clear eye and hard head". The embassy reopened on 23 August 2015.

=== Oceania ===
Country	Formal relations began	Notes
Australia	21 September 1968	See Australia–Iran relations Both countries established diplomatic relations on 21 September 1968.: Australia has an embassy in Tehran.; Iran has an embassy in Canberra.; Following the United States strikes on Iranian nuclear sites in June 2025, Australian Prime Minister Anthony Albanese and Foreign Minister Penny Wong voiced support for the operation. Albanese announced in August 2025 that he would expel Iran's ambassador, and that Australia would cease diplomatic actions in Iran after it was revealed Iran had perpetrated the Lewis Continental Kitchen attack in October 2024, as well as the December 2024 Melbourne synagogue attack. Australia also declared the Islamic Revolutionary Guard Corps as a terrorist organisation.
New Zealand	14 December 1973	See Iran–New Zealand relations Both countries established diplomatic relations on 14 December 1973.: Iran has an embassy in Wellington.; New Zealand has an embassy in Tehran.

== International organization participation ==
Iran is the member of the following organizations: ALBA (observer), BRICS, Colombo Plan, UNESCAP, ECO, FAO, GECF, G-15, G-24, G-77, IAEA, IBRD, ICC, ICAO, IDA, International Federation of Red Cross and Red Crescent Societies, IFC, IFAD, IHO, ILO, IMO, IMSO, IMF, IOC, IOM, ISO, International Red Cross and Red Crescent Movement, ITU, Interpol, IDB, NAM, OPEC, OPCW, OIC, PCA, SCO, SAARC (observer), UNESCO, UNCTAD, UNIDO, UNODC, United Nations, UPU, WCO WFTU, WHO, WMO, WTO (observer).

== Notes ==
On 1 March 2026, following Iranian attacks during the 2026 Iran War, the UAE officially severed ties with Iran, closing its embassy and withdrawing its ambassador.

== See also ==
- Axis of Resistance
- International rankings of Iran
- Iranian citizens abroad
- Geography of Iran
- Iran–Contra Affair
- Iran–Iraq War
- List of diplomatic missions in Iran
- List of diplomatic visits to Iran
- United Nations Security Council Resolution 1747
- Foreign Direct Investment in Iran
- Middle East economic integration
- Shia crescent
- Hormuz Peace Initiative
- Academic relations between Iran and the United States
- Venezuela Iran ghost flights
