= Iran–Libya relations =

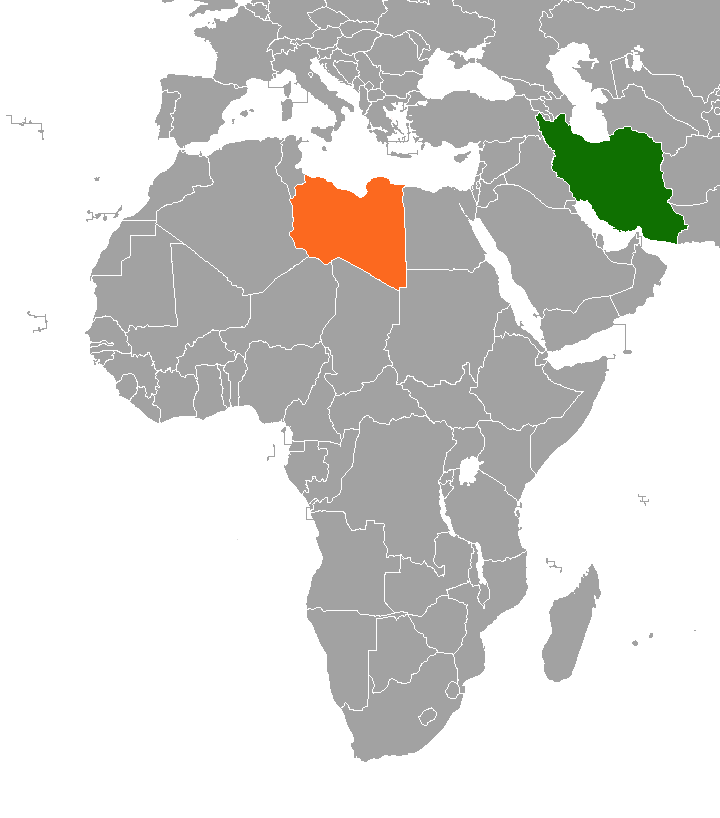

- Iran: Libya

Diplomatic mission
- Iranian embassy, Tripoli: Libyan embassy, Tehran

Iran and Libya have diplomatic relations, with embassies in each other's countries. Economic, military, and cultural relations between the two countries have varied throughout time. Ties between the two nations date back thousands of years, with the origins of the Persian Empire beginning in the modern day state of Iran and the modern day Libyan state once being an essential part of the Roman Empire.

== Pahlavi government ==
Modern Iranian-Libyan relations began in the 1960s with King Idris reigning in Libya and Shah Mohammad Reza Pahlavi reigning in Iran. Tension began between the two nations following the rise of Colonel Muammar Gaddafi in Libya. Gaddafi, along with other Arab leaders, accused the Shah of betraying his Arab neighbors' interests and supporting Israel.

== After the Iranian revolution ==
=== Before the Libyan revolution ===
The Iranian Revolution of 1979 resulted in the overthrow of the Shah and the improvement of Iranian-Libyan relations. The turning point in Iran–Libya relations came during the Iran–Iraq War, when Libya came to Iran's aid despite Western pressure to keep Iran isolated. During the war Libya and Syria were Iran's only Middle Eastern allies.

Relations, however, were strained when Musa al-Sadr, a leading Lebanese cleric (born in Iran) of Shia Islam branch, disappeared in Libya. This had forced the Iranian government since 1979 to sometimes distance itself from the Libyan regime.

Iranian-Libyan cooperation during the 1990s led to the construction of factories, roads and hospitals in both Libya and Iran. Gaddafi would even visit then Iranian president Akbar Hashemi Rafsanjani and the Supreme Leader of Iran, Ali Khamenei.

=== After the Libyan revolution ===
Iran-Libyan Arab Jamahiriya relations
- Iran: Libya

Iran supported the 2011 uprising against the Libyan government, describing it as an "Islamic awakening" and condemning the government crackdown. The Libyan ambassador to Iran later resigned due to the Arab Spring protests in his home country. Following the overthrow of Gaddafi, Iran recognized the new Libyan transitional government. Iran's ambassador would soon return to the newly formed State of Libya.

== See also ==
- Foreign relations of Iran
- Foreign relations of Libya
