= Foreign policy of the Masoud Pezeshkian administration =

Iranian foreign policy since 2024

Since 28 July 2024, the administration of Masoud Pezeshkian has shaped Iran's foreign policy, reflecting both his pre-election intentions and his condemnations of Israel while in office. Within his first 100 days, Masoud Pezeshkian's administration has made decisions regarding the assassination of Ismail Haniyeh, the Gaza war, the Israel–Hezbollah conflict, and the Operation True Promise II, among other geopolitical events. His foreign policy is led by Minister of Foreign Affairs Abbas Araghchi.

== Background ==
Following the death of Ebrahim Raisi in a helicopter crash while returning from Baku, a snap election was called in accordance with the Constitution of Iran. During the election debates, Masoud Pezeshkian emerged as a moderate candidate who favored rapprochement with the West and the removal of sanctions. He supported former President Hassan Rouhani's foreign policy regarding the initial signing of the Joint Comprehensive Plan of Action (JCPOA)—later revoked by then-U.S. President Donald Trump—and expressed a desire to expand Iranian trade relations globally. He also signaled an intent to revive the nuclear deal with the P5+1 countries.

Additionally, Pezeshkian referenced former Supreme Leader Ruhollah Khomeini's and current Supreme Leader Ayatollah Seyyed Ali Khamenei's policy of "Neither East Nor West." Specifically, he stated:

Our main problem in the country is this division. When one government is in power, FATF opposes it, but when the next government takes over, it supports it. If we want to prosper internationally, the more connections we establish, the better our standard of living. The Ministry of Foreign Affairs—or foreign policy in general—should be flexible and offer various alternatives for negotiations and trade. Do you know how much we are losing right now because of FATF and the JCPOA? We are losing several thousand billion daily. Some entities profit from sanctions. We will advance our foreign policy based on the general policies (proposed by the Leader of the Islamic Revolution) of dignity, wisdom, and expediency.

Pezeshkian was regarded by Western observers as a moderate candidate for change, and his candidacy was seen as offering an opportunity to improve Iran–United States relations as well as relations with the broader West.

== Armenia ==
Iran is one of two countries with accessible borders to Armenia. Pezeshkian declared a special level of relations with the northern neighbor. Araghchi also reaffirmed Iran's support for Armenia's "territorial integrity," particularly in the aftermath of the Second Nagorno-Karabakh War and amid concerns over the potential construction of the Zangezur corridor. This followed his predecessor's opening of a consulate in Syunik Province.

== Israel ==
On the day Pezeshkian was sworn in, Ismail Haniyeh was assassinated. A few weeks later, Iran launched Operation True Promise II, which was widely regarded as a major step in attacking Israel and as a demonstration of Iran's capacity to do so. On 1 October, Israel attacked Iran for the first time. While Iran downplayed the strikes, Pezeshkian stated that Iran had the right to self-defense, leaving open the possibility of a counter-strike.

Araghchi asserted that the United States was responsible and called for a United Nations Security Council meeting to condemn Israel. He also added that Iran had "received indications" of the attack hours before it occurred.

Hezbollah Secretary-General Hassan Nasrallah died following an Israeli airstrike on the groups headquarters in Dahieh on the evening of 27 September 2024. According to reports, he either succumbed to toxic fumes while trapped under the rubble or died from blunt force trauma sustained during the attack.

== Foreign visits ==
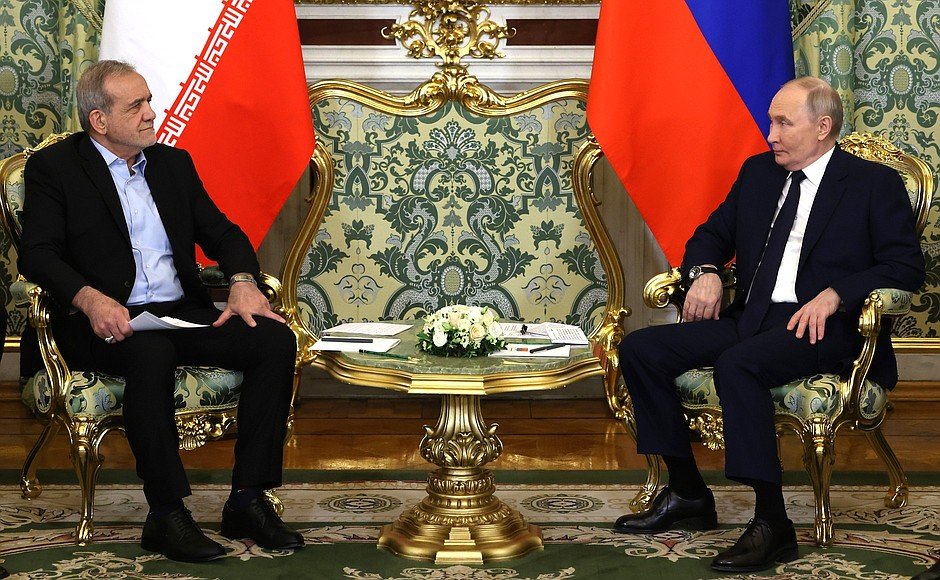
Pezeshkian and Russian President Vladimir Putin in Moscow, Russia, on 17 January 2025

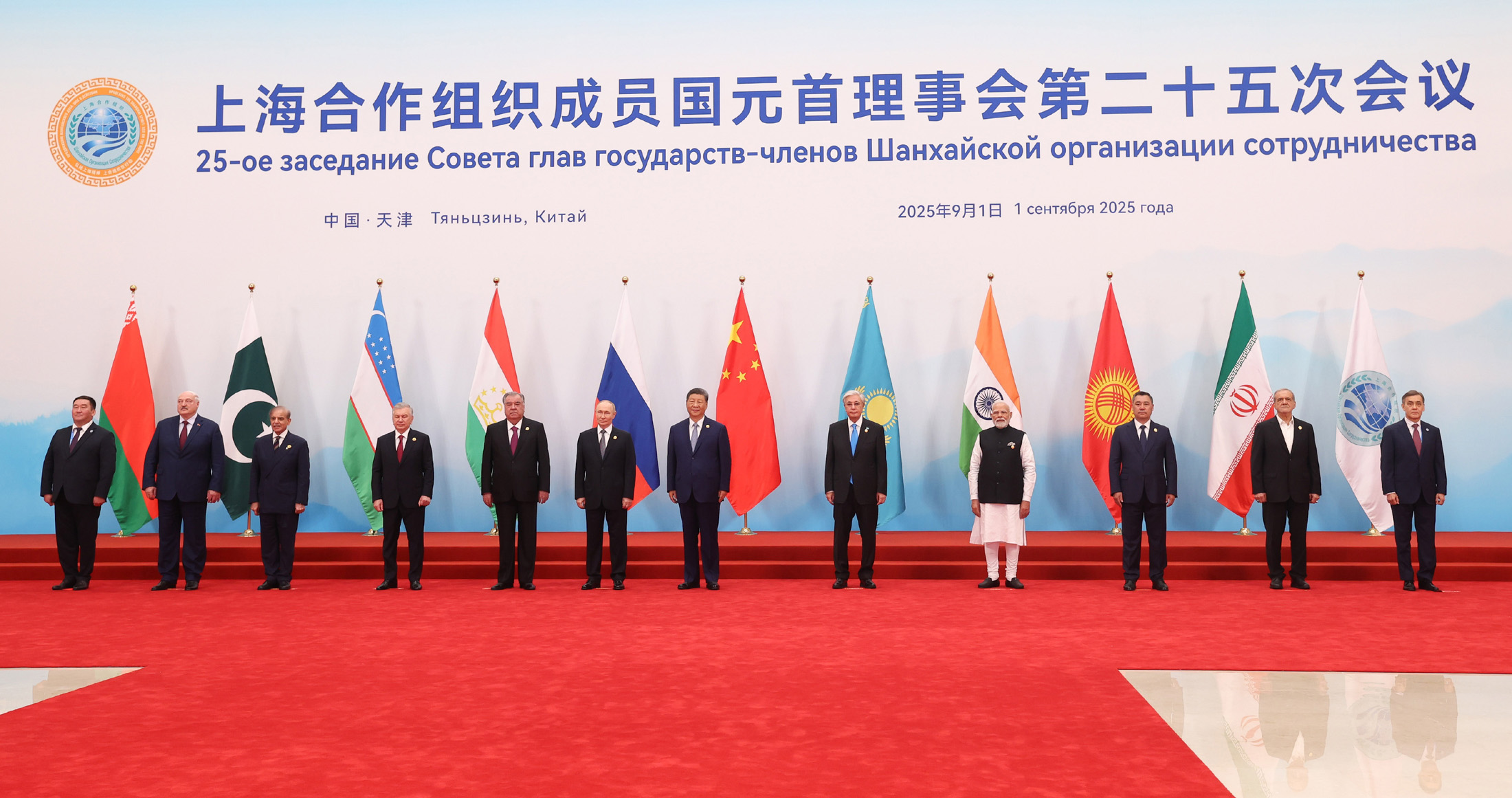
Pezeshkian at the 2025 Tianjin SCO summit in China

Following his inauguration, Pezeshkian made his first foreign trip to neighboring Iraq in line with his stated goals of alleviating sanctions and pursuing a more moderate course than some of his hardline predecessors. He also visited a monument dedicated to former Islamic Revolutionary Guard Corps General Qassem Soleimani, who was killed in a U.S. attack. Pezeshkian became the first Iranian president to visit the semi-autonomous Iraqi Kurdistan. During the opening session of the United Nations General Assembly, he visited New York City to address fellow member states. In early October, he also attended the Interrelation of Times and Civilisations—Basis of Peace and Development forum in Turkmenistan, marking his first interaction with Russian President Vladimir Putin.

For the 16th BRICS summit, held from 22 to 24 October 2024 in Kazan, Russia, Pezeshkian attended the first summit since Iran became a full member of BRICS+. There, he sought to draw the attention of other members to the wars in Gaza and Lebanon involving Israel. He also emphasized the need for cohesion on economic and financial issues among the member states. Additionally, Pezeshkian held bilateral meetings, including one with host Russian President Vladimir Putin, who pledged a future bilateral pact. He further discussed the prospect of closer relations with Armenia.

== Analysis ==
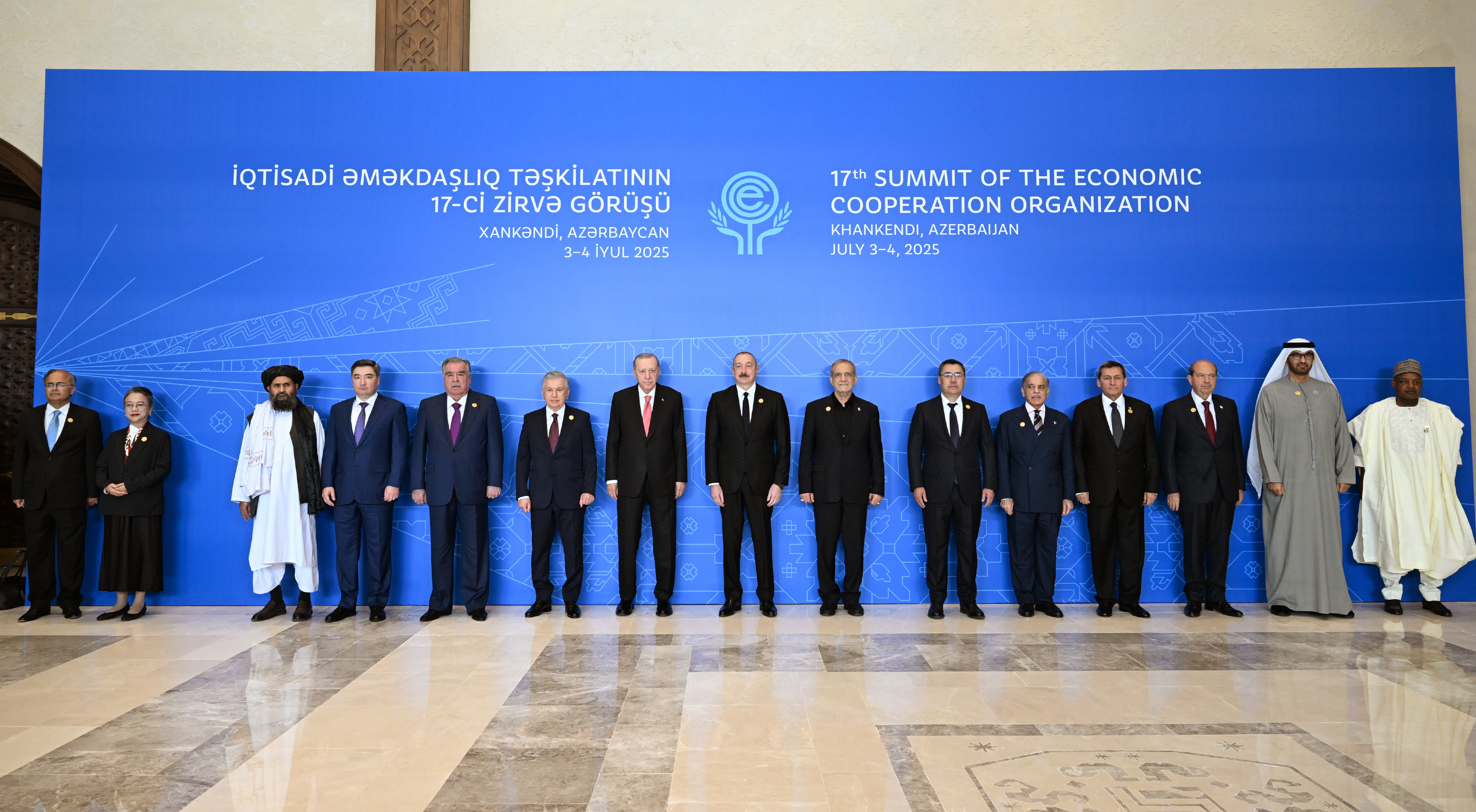
Group photo at the 17th Economic Cooperation Organization summit in Khankendi, Azerbaijan, featuring Pezeshkian, 4 July 2025

Think tank Rasanah suggested that Pezeshkian's foreign policy initiatives include prioritizing regional relations—such as those between the Arab League and Iran, particularly Iran–Saudi Arabia relations—as well as promoting dialogue with the West, supporting the Axis of Resistance to Israel, and strengthening ties with revisionist states such as Russia and China, seeking to create a multipolar world order designed to reduce U.S. dominance.

Discussion website Moon of Alabama suggested that Pezeshkian who previously pursued a moderate course shifted his foreign policy after Israel's assassinations of Ismail Haniyeh, who had attended his inauguration, and Hassan Nasrallah.

== See also ==
- Foreign policy of Iran
- 2025–2026 Iran–United States negotiations
