= De-escalation =

Decrease in severity of conflicts

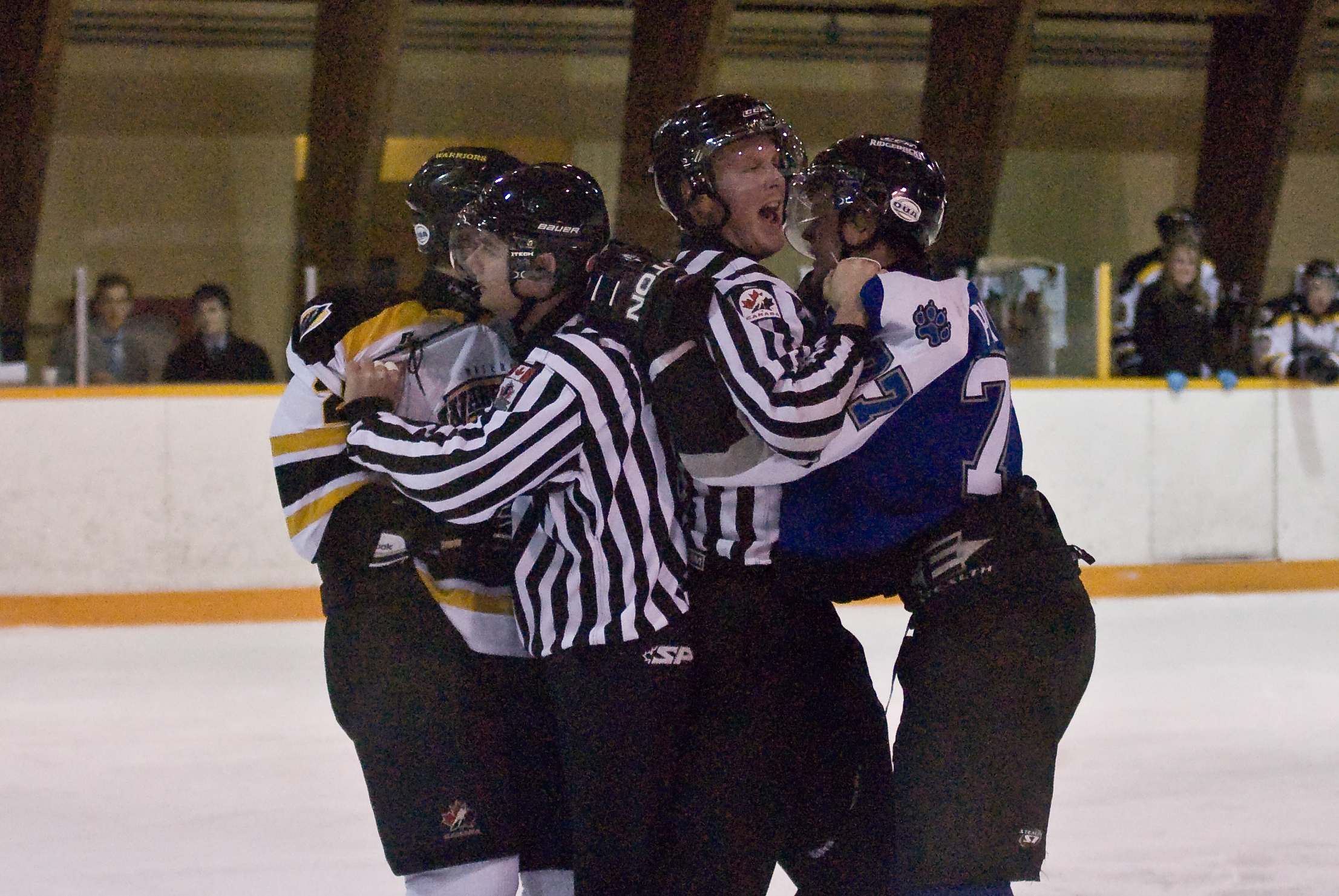
Referees intervene in a fight between ice hockey players.

De-escalation refers to the methods and actions taken to decrease the severity of a conflict, whether of physical, verbal or another nature. It is the opposite of escalation. De-escalation may also refer to approaches in conflict resolution, by which specific measures are taken to avoid behaviours that escalate conflict. De-escalation can be modelled with game theory.

== Psychology ==
=== Verbal de-escalation in psychiatric settings ===
In psychiatric settings, de-escalation is aimed at calmly communicating with an agitated client in order to understand, manage, and resolve their concerns. Ultimately, these actions are intended to reduce the client's agitation and potential for present or future aggression or violence. An insufficient or overdue intervention may leave staff needing to use coercive measures to manage an aggressive or violent client. Coercive measures, such as chemical or mechanical restraints, or seclusion, are damaging to the therapeutic relationship and harmful to clients and staff.

As of 2016, there are 19 articles in literature that define or provide a model of de-escalation. Articles converge on a number of themes (i.e. de-escalation should involve safely, calmly, and empathetically supporting the client with their concerns).

Hankin et al.'s (2011) review of four de-escalation studies reflects the somewhat unclear state of de-escalation research. Their review settles on eight goals, seven elements, 15 general techniques, and 15 other techniques divided into three subheadings.

Price & Baker (2012) identify seven themes across relevant papers: three related to staff skills (e.g. empathetic concern, calm appearance and gentle tone of voice) and four related to the process of intervention (e.g. establishing rapport, maintaining safety, problem solving and setting limits).

The available literature provides clinical descriptions of effective de-escalation based on qualitative data and professional observations. However, these thematic analyses need to be supported by more objective data; one hallmark of such objectivity would be an empirical scale or quantitative measure of de-escalation.

=== De-Escalating Aggressive Behaviour Scale (DABS) ===
An English modified version of the De-Escalating Aggressive Behaviour Scale (DABS) identifies seven qualities necessary for de-escalation:

- Valuing the client: Provides genuine acknowledgement that the client's concerns are valid, important and will be addressed in a meaningful way.
- Reducing fear: Listens actively to the client and offers genuine empathy while suggesting that the client's situation has the potential for positive future change.
- Inquiring about client's queries and anxiety: Can communicate a thorough understanding of the client's concerns, and works to uncover the root of the issue.
- Providing guidance to the client: Suggests multiple ways to help the client with their current concerns and recommends preventive measures.
- Working out possible agreements: Takes responsibility for the client's care and concludes the encounter with an agreed-upon short-term solution and a long-term action plan.
- Remaining calm: Maintains a calm tone of voice and steady pace that is appropriate to the client's feelings and behaviour.
- Risk taking: Maintains a moderate distance from the client to ensure safety, but does not appear guarded and fearful.

== Law enforcement ==
=== United States ===
Starting around 2015, after facing criticism after numerous high-profile killings of civilians by police officers, police forces in the US, including the Los Angeles Police Department and the Tempe Police Department (Arizona), adopted de-escalation training, designed to reduce the risk of confrontations turning violent or deadly for anyone involved.

The FIRST STEP Act prison reform bill, passed under the Trump administration, mandates de-escalation training, especially for "incidents that involve the unique needs of individuals who have a mental illness or cognitive deficit." Across U.S. law enforcement departments, de-escalation primarily involves slowing down encounters with offenders as well as avoiding force wherever possible, with a focus on creating distance with the offender.

==== Need for de-escalation practices in law enforcement ====
Richards (2007) states that de-escalation is the act of moving from a state of high tension to a state of reduced tension. Bell (2018) points out that the reason there is heightened tension in law enforcement today than ever before is due to technology. Media reports on the use of force, racial unrest, riots and injustice make it seem like conflicts between police and citizens are happening every day. Bell notes that because people can so readily view these conflicts between police and citizens through technology, people have become resistant to or challenging of law enforcement. In response, the police have had to become engaged in social media, ethics training, diversity training and de-escalation programs.

Bell notes that police are different from average citizens. He states that citizens have a "duty to retreat" while trained officers are expected to pursue and make arrests if need be. Sometimes officers have some discretion in how they will handle a situation such as when an encounter has the potential to become violent. It is at these times that "officers can turn to de-escalation tactics and still complete their mission to protect and serve." Oliva et al. note, "As the role of police officers continues to expand from exclusively crime fighting to encompass other service-oriented functions, they must be able to recognize the characteristics of individuals in crisis in order to provide an effective and helpful resolution to the situation while reducing liability and risk of injury" (p. 16.) Hence the need for de-escalation tactics on the part of law enforcement officers.

==== Types of de-escalation practices ====
De-escalation tactics predominantly revolved around securing the scene at hand and attempting to calmly communicate with the citizen involved. Andrew Bell describes several de-escalation practices to assist in a potentially violent situation:

- The Tactical Pause entails stepping back, pausing to allow everyone involved a brief moment to think, perhaps ending or limiting a fight-or-flight response.
- The Just-Be-Nice Tactic where the police officer speaks and gives commands in a friendly tone regardless of how the citizen is conducting themselves. Bell notes that there are occasions when the situation is not, in fact, what it appears to be, and the citizen is not committing a crime or violation. The Just-Be-Nice Tactic is particularly helpful in such cases.
- Be Aware, Understand, then React. Police need to avoid getting caught up in the moment so should take a moment to be aware, assess and understand what is going on around them before they react.

Oliva et al. suggest the following basic de-escalation techniques: securing the scene, remove distractions or disruptive people from the area. Further, "The officer should remain calm and speak slowly, in short sentences, to encourage communication. The responding officer should also present a genuine willingness to understand and help". Oliva et al. go on to outline the following specific de-escalation techniques:

- Effective Communication so that the officer and individual can understand each other.
- Active Listening Skills such as reflecting statements like "I understand that makes you angry". Use of minimal encouragers-brief responses, like saying 'OK,' that let the person know the officer is listening. Introducing oneself using "I" statements restating statements the individual says mirroring/reflecting or summarizing/paraphrasing.
- Use of Open-Ended/Closed-Ended Questions.

Oliva et al. also note behaviours that officers should avoid when attempting to de-escalate a situation which include: Not asking "why" questions as it makes the person defensive, they shouldn't rush the person, never speak too loudly, they should keep their feelings from interfering, they shouldn't challenge a person if they are having delusions or hallucinations but neither should they agree they are real.

==== Memphis Model ====
One of the most prominent de-escalation programs was developed by The Memphis Crisis Intervention Team or CIT. This program, which has come to be known as the Memphis Model, provides law enforcement with crisis intervention training to particularly help those with mental illness. This program is aimed at diverting those in a mental health crisis from ending up in jail. The goal of the program is to improve the safety of officers, family members and people in the community and to direct people with mental illness away from the judicial system and into the healthcare system. Through this program, officers are given 40 hours of comprehensive training that includes de-escalation techniques. Officers engage in role-playing various scenarios as part of this program.

According to The Memphis Crisis Intervention Team, research on the efficacy of CIT shows that it helps officers feel more confident, increases jail diversion for those with mental illness, increases the likelihood that those with mental illness get treatment, and injury to officers is significantly reduced. Compton et al. (2008) conducted a comprehensive review of the existing research on the effectiveness of the Memphis Model of the Crisis Intervention Team. While research is limited, the authors note that there is preliminary support that the Memphis Model may be helpful in connecting those with mental illness to the psychiatric services that they need. The authors further note that police officers knowledge and confidence improve with such training. Arrest rates also appear to be lower by officers trained in the CIT model.

According to PBS, the Memphis Model has expanded to approximately 3,000 law enforcement agencies across the United States. However, there are shortcomings to the research done on the effectiveness of the CIT programs such as lack of control groups and small sample sizes. The CIT programs around the country seem limited to addressing instituting de-escalation interventions with the mentally ill and not with the broader range of offenders that law enforcement officers may encounter. Furthermore, not all officers are trained in CIT; only self-selected police officers participate in this specialized training.

==== Simulation-based De-escalation Training ====
Traditional deescalation training relies on a combination of direct instruction (e.g., lectures, presentations, webinars), group discussion, and live "peer role-play" among class participants. The experiential aspect of role-play (both simulated and with live peers) has been found to be especially important for helping trainees develop core de-escalation skills and be able to deploy those skills in high-pressure situations. Accordingly, in 2023 U.S. Senators introduced S. 2637, to fund the development and distribution of a federal law enforcement training program that uses "live-action simulations and role playing to place law enforcement personnel in an interactive learning environment to replicate real-life scenarios or teach particular skills or techniques." Those skills and techniques must include situational awareness, critical decision-making and problem-solving, crisis intervention, and de-escalation.

Work in other fields (especially healthcare) has drawn into question the value of live peer role-play, over other options for interactive training. Researchers have found that this is because the live peer role-play experience can vary so greatly with the quality of the training facilitator and acting skills of one's partner in role-play exercises. Participants reported that peer role-play is generally inferior to other role-play options that are aimed at greater consistency and authenticity. This has led an increasing number of agencies and organizations in healthcare and law enforcement to adopt simulation-based de-escalation training over peer roleplay. Simulation-based training ensures a consistent and engaging experience for all trainees.

Simulation-based training follows many of the basic de-escalation approaches noted above (e.g. effective communication and assessment of the scene) but is done through screen-based or head-mounted virtual reality simulator. Notable simulation-based de-escalation training systems include FAAC's MILO Range System (a screen-based simulator) and Apex Officer's Virtual Reality Training (a head-mounted VR simulator). These training systems address a range of de-escalation situations not limited just to work with the mentally ill.

Screen-based simulators have been in use in law enforcement training for since the 1990s. While early systems were rudimentary and focused on a single domain (like marksmanship or pursuit driving), by the early 2000s they'd expanded to include de-escalation and other soft skills.

Today, screen-based simulators are generally understood to offer the broadest range of training options. They can run either computer-generated simulations, or those filmed in high-definition video using live actors. These simulations can be used for marksmanship (including live fire ), use-of-force, driving, or de-escalation/interaction/communication training by single officers, groups of officers, or teams of officers and non-law enforcement personal (such as social workers).

Head-mounted virtual reality systems like Apex Officer's Virtual Reality Training (introduced to the International Association of Chiefs of Police (IACP) at their 126th Annual Conference and Exposition in Chicago, Illinois in October 2019.) are more limited in their offerings. Despite being more immersive according to some studies, the reliance on lower-fidelity computer-generated environments and characters make such systems better suited to single-person training on decision-making and de-escalation.

== International relations ==
In the military, de-escalation is a way to prevent military conflict escalation. A historic example is the teaching harvested from the Proud Prophet war simulation of a conflict between the US and the USSR, which took place in 1983. In war-time diplomacy, de-escalation is used as an exit strategy, sometimes called an "off-ramp" or "slip road". In such cases, an alternative peaceful resolution is offered to a belligerent (i.e. nation or person engaged in war or conflict) in order to avoid further bloodshed. Restraint or appeasement against interventionism can in some cases lead to escalation instead of de-escalation. Deterrence is one strategy to decrease conflict severity. Prevention of casualties, for example through air defense, can have de-escalatory effects. In asymmetric conflicts a probabilistic escalation might be rational for one side in some situations, resulting in challenges for de-escalation. "De-escalation through escalation" strategy hopes for increased probability of a diplomatic deal or further de-escalation.

== See also ==
- Acquiescence – Legal concept
- Bargaining model of war – Transactional view of violent conflict in international relations theory
- Brinkmanship – Political and military tactic
- Ceasefire – Temporary agreement to stop a war
- Chicken (game) – Model of conflict for two players in game theory
- Conflict avoidance – Behaviors to prevent or minimize conflict
- Cost of conflict – Tool to calculate the price of human conflict
- De-escalation policy of the Islamic Republic of Iran – One of the foreign policy strategies in the Islamic Republic of Iran
- Demilitarisation – Reduction of state armed forces
- Mexican standoff – Type of confrontation
- Mediation – Dispute resolution with assistance of a moderator
- Security dilemma – Unwanted escalation of interstate tensions
- Si vis pacem, para bellum – Latin adage translated as, "If you want peace, prepare for war"
- Stability–instability paradox – International relations theory
- Right of self-defense – Right for people to use reasonable force or defensive force
- Ritualized aggression – Any social behaviour related to fighting
