= Iran–Mexico relations =

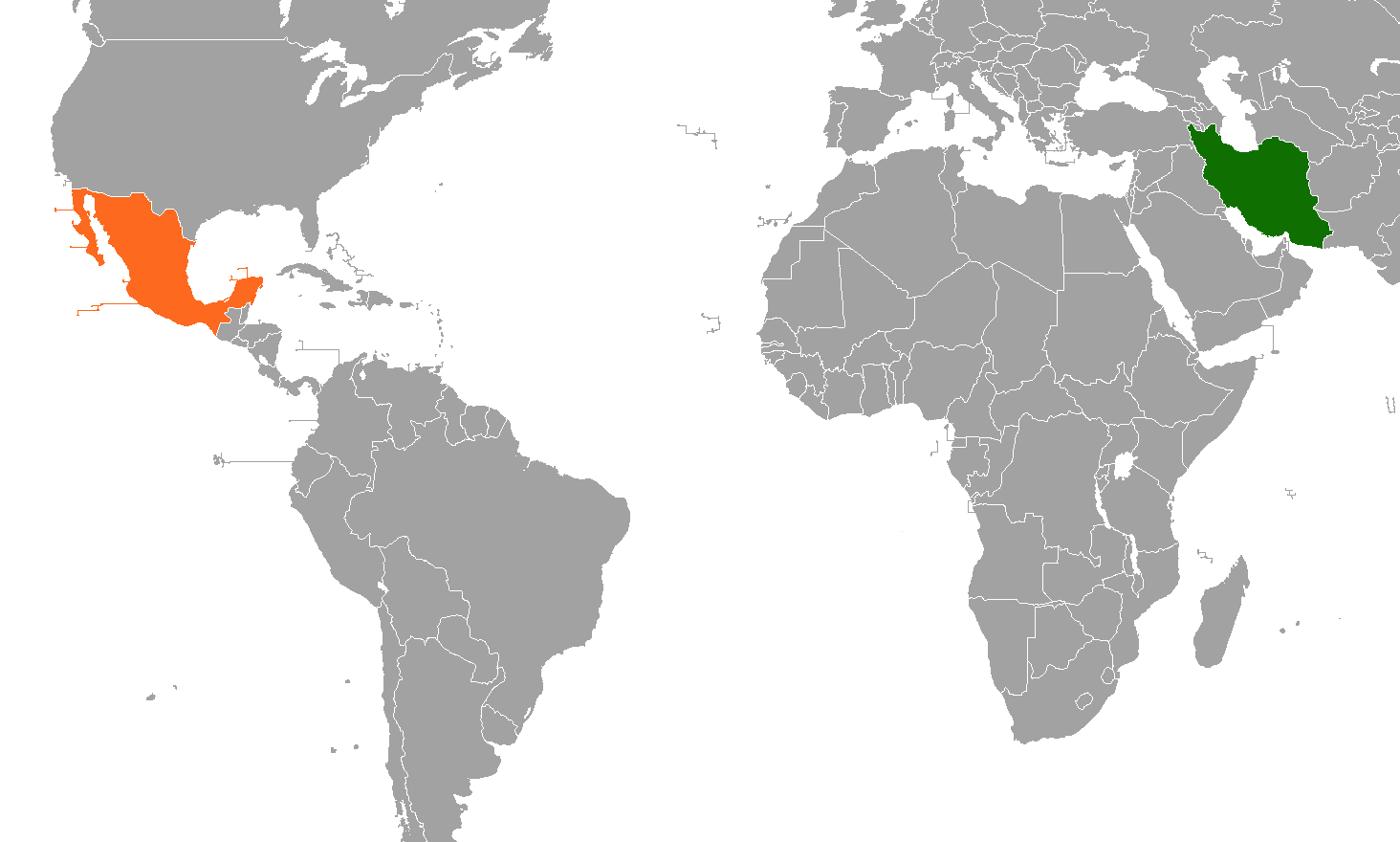

- Iran: Mexico

Diplomatic mission
- Embassy of Iran, Mexico City: Embassy of Mexico, Tehran

The nations of Iran and Mexico established diplomatic relations in 1964. Both nations are members of the Group of 15, Group of 24, and the United Nations.

== History ==
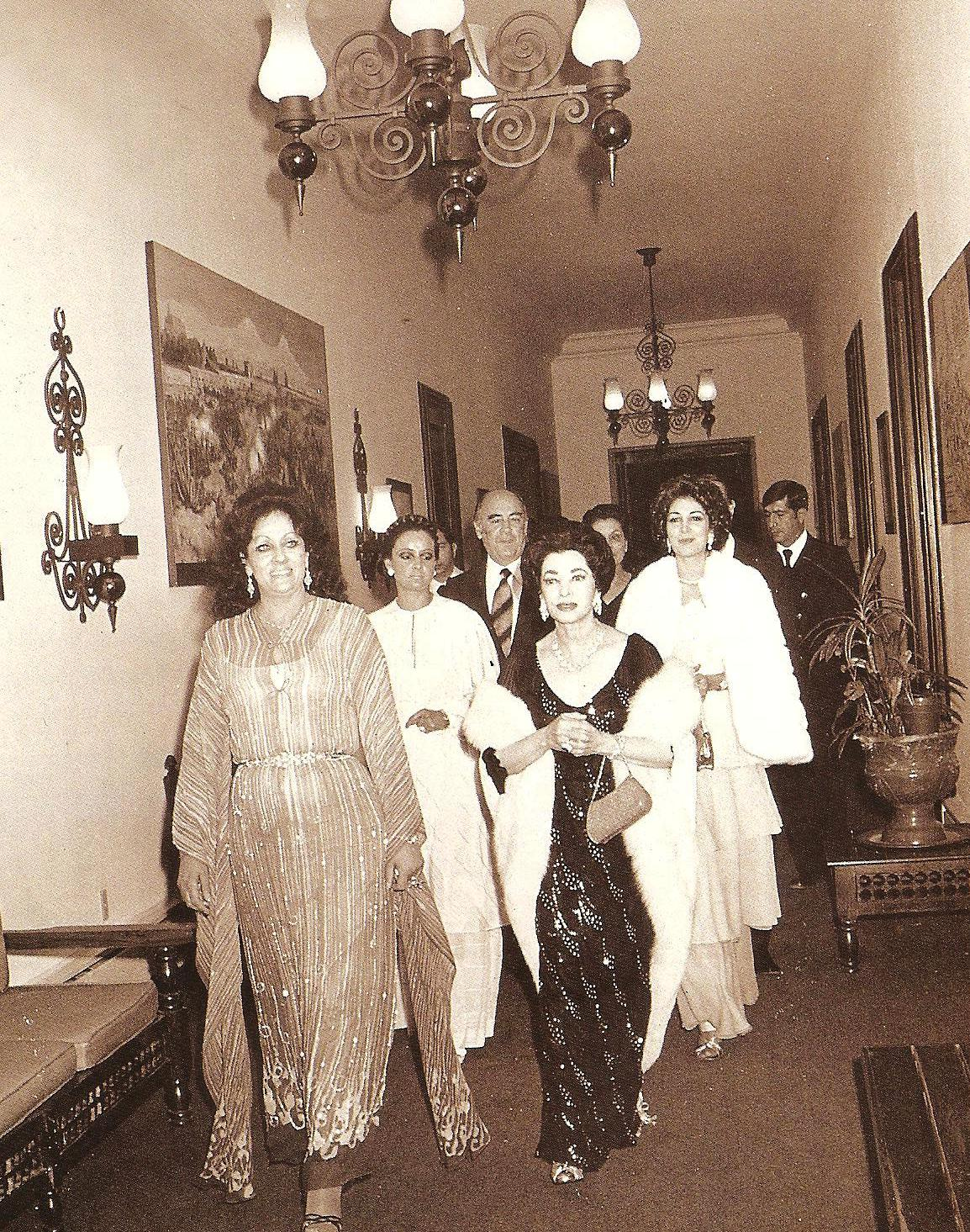
Mexican First Lady Carmen Romano and President José López Portillo accompanying Iranian Queen Consort Tadj ol-Molouk in Mexico City; 1978.

The first diplomatic contacts between Qajar Iran (then known as Persia) and Porfiriato-era Mexico took place in 1889. In May 1903, a treaty of friendship was signed between the two nations; however, it was later abolished and declared null by the Iranian government in May 1928 due to a technicality. In 1937, a new treaty was signed between the two nations and on 15 October 1964, formal diplomatic relations were established.

In May 1975, Mohammad Reza Pahlavi paid a high-level visit to Mexico where he met with President Luis Echeverría. During the Shah's visit, he and Echeverría discussed events transpiring in the Middle East at the time; both leaders agreed to strengthen their bilateral relations and to open embassies in each other's capitals. In July 1975, Echeverría paid an official visit to Iran, the first and only visit to the country by a sitting Mexican head of state.

In January 1978, anti-government demonstrations intensified in Iran, and were followed by the Islamic Revolution. The Iranian monarchy was consequently abolished and replaced with an Islamic republic while the Pahlavi dynasty fled the country into exile. After first fleeing to Egypt, Morocco, and then The Bahamas, the Pahlavi family arrived in Mexico in June 1979, where they were granted political asylum. Fearing reprisals by the Iranian people and the new government for its decision in allowing the Shah to seek asylum in Mexico; Mexico closed its embassy in Tehran that same year. As a result, Iran downgraded its diplomatic representation in Mexico to that of a chargé d'affaires. In October 1979, the Shah left Mexico and entered the United States for cancer treatment; he later succumbed to his illness in July 1980 in Cairo, Egypt.

In July 1992, Mexico re-opened its embassy in Tehran and in 1994, a joint Iran–Mexico conference was held in Tehran with the objective of strengthening bilateral relations. A second conference took place seven years later, in 2001, in Mexico City. In December 2014, an Iranian parliamentarian delegation visited Mexico to mark 50 years since the two states established diplomatic relations. In February 2018, the first meeting bilateral political consultations was held in Mexico City.

In May 2024, Mexican President Andrés Manuel López Obrador sent condolences for the death of Iranian President Ebrahim Raisi and Foreign Minister Hossein Amir-Abdollahian. In September 2026, the Azadi Tower in Tehran beamed with the colors of Mexico's flag to commemorate Mexico's Independence Day.

== High-level visits ==
From Iran to Mexico

- Shah Mohammad Reza Pahlavi (1975)
- Foreign Minister Ali Akbar Velayati (1993)
- Foreign Vice-Minister Majid Takht-Ravanchi (2015)
- Foreign Minister Mohammad Javad Zarif (2016)

From Mexico to Iran

- President Luis Echeverría (1975)
- Foreign Minister Fernando Solana Morales (1992)
- Foreign Undersecretary Carmen Moreno (2000)
- Foreign Undersecretary Carlos de Icaza (2014)

== Bilateral agreements ==
Both countries have signed some bilateral agreements such as the Friendship Agreement (1903); Agreement on Scientific and Technical Cooperation (1975); Agreement on Cultural Cooperation (1975); Joint Commission (1993); Memorandum of Understanding to Strengthen Inter-Parliamentary Links (2014); and a Memorandum of Understanding on Political Consultations (2015).

== Trade ==
In 2023, total trade between both nations amounted to US$14.9 million. Iran's main exports to Mexico include: polymers in propylene or other olefins, apparatus for protecting electrical circuits, parts and accessories for machines, hides and skins, instruments for medical equipment, fish, fruits and nuts. Mexico's main exports to Iran include: parts and accessories for machines, pharmaceutical articles, oral and dental equipment.

== Resident diplomatic missions ==
- Iran has an embassy in Mexico City.
- Mexico has an embassy in Tehran.
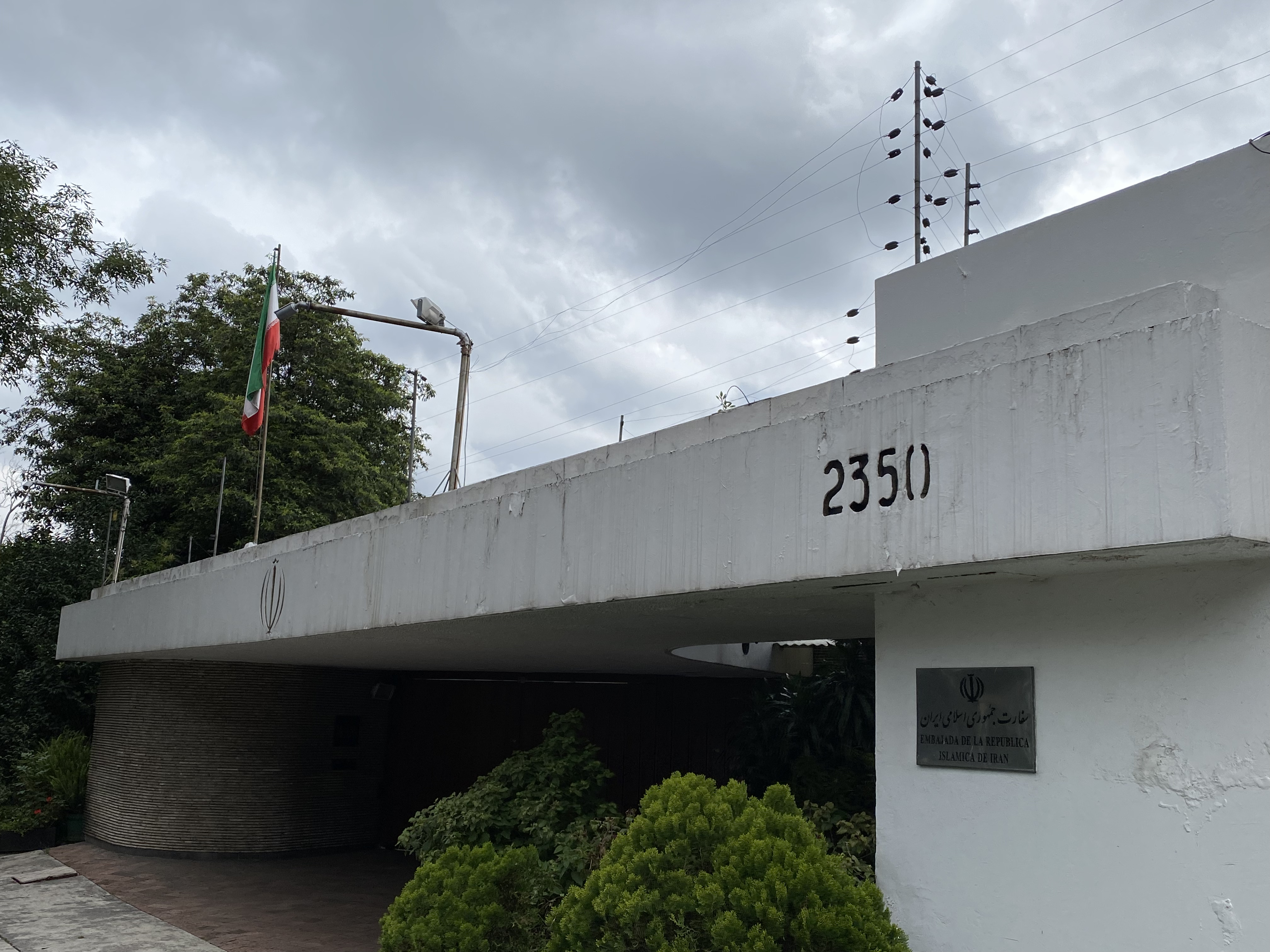
Embassy of Iran in Mexico City

== Gallery ==
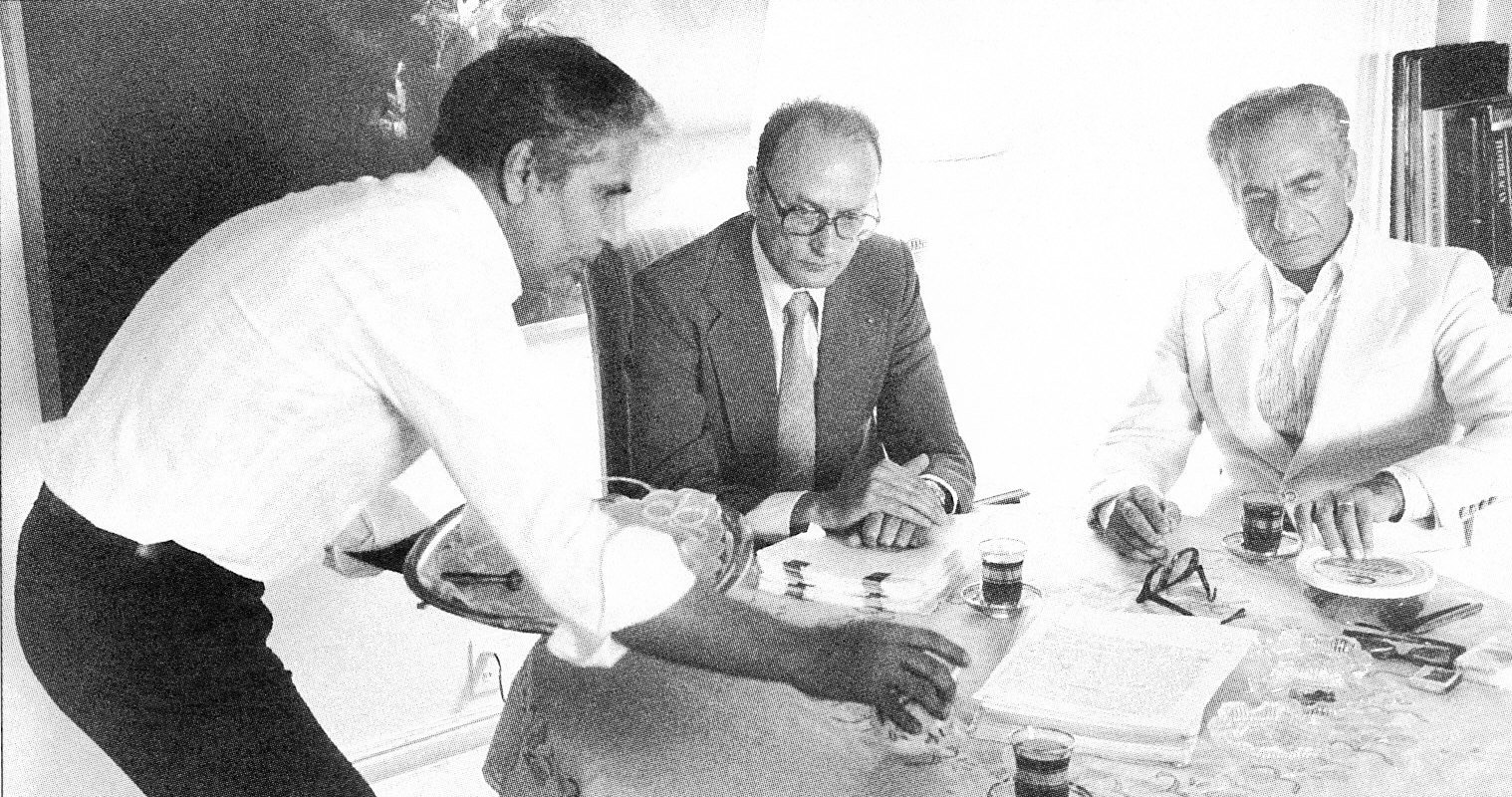
Shah of Iran in Cuernavaca, Mexico, in 1979

Front gate of the Iranian Embassy in Mexico City
