= Iran–Senegal relations =

- Iran: Senegal

Iran–Senegal relations refer to the historical and current bilateral relationship between the Islamic Republic of Iran and Senegal.

On 23 February 2011, Senegal severed diplomatic relations with Iran but relations have since then been reestablished. Relations were described as positive in 2019.

== State visits ==
Iranian president Mahmoud Ahmadinejad and his Senegalese counterpart Abdoulaye Wade had a joint press conference along with a close meeting in February 2008 in the city of Mashhad, both side pledged to expand the bilateral ties in the fields of economy, tourism and politics in addition to increase the efforts for empowering the OIC.

== Economic ties ==
Iran-based automaker Iran Khodro established an assembly line to produce cars designed in Iran in Senegal and dispatch them to the African markets directly from Dakar. This Iranian-Senegalese company has the capacity to produce 10,000 Samand cars annually.
