= De-escalation policy of the Islamic Republic of Iran =

One of the foreign policy strategies in the Islamic Republic of Iran

The De-escalation policy of the Islamic Republic of Iran is a strategy in Iran's foreign policy that began during the second term of Akbar Hashemi Rafsanjani's presidency and with the presidency of Mohammad Khatami since 1997, special attention was paid to this strategy. Hassan Rouhani (7th president of Iran) also mentioned the de-escalation policy as his top priority during his presidency.

The "De-escalation policy of the Islamic Republic of Iran" briefly states that in the face of globalization, Iran's foreign relations with other countries should be based on building trust and resolving past misunderstandings. "De-escalation policy" is based on principles such as the acceptance of political-economic pluralism, peaceful coexistence, the avoidance of ideological conflict, and the abandonment of hegemony and hegemonic policies.

According to international relations experts, the implementation of the "De-escalation policy" by Iran led to important successes, including the promotion of Iran's position in OPEC.

== Objectives and manners ==
The objectives and manners of the "De-escalation policy" in general can be summarized as follows:

- De-escalation policy is not a final solution of tensions, but an intermediate state that incorporates elements of convergence and permissive, and is typically an effort to promote cooperation and coexistence with governments and to avoid emphasizing and reducing disputes, or reducing tensions in international relations. De-escalating foreign policy typically seeks to remove international obstacles to the country's development and to attract international resources for the country's development and strength.
- De-escalation is sometimes defined as the most important principle in international relations by resorting to peaceful methods and psychological modernization at the international level and activating diplomacy through bilateral and multilateral dialogue, and its purpose is to improve the level of political and economic relations in order to achieve regional and global security.
- By adopting a policy of de-escalation with different countries of the world, success in the field of foreign policy is more likely and on the other hand, it prepare the space for improving and promoting exchanges between economic actors of countries. Moving towards a policy of de-escalation does not mean retreating from fundamental positions and backtracking from national interests.

Design and implement a set of confidence-building measures to eradicate some of the international system's common misconceptions about Iran, is the most important objective of "De-escalation policy of the Islamic Republic of Iran".

== Chronicles ==
De-escalation in the sense of rebuilding relations with conflicting international and regional countries in the foreign policy process of countries, Iran started such a process from 1988 onwards. Economic and technological needs along with strategic necessities were the cause of this formation. This process paved the way for the emergence and expansion of the trust-building discourse.

Early in the formation of the Islamic Republic of Iran, regional resistance was a reflection of Islamic ideological indicators and led to the growth of the Islamic consciousness movement. In the second decade of the revolution, manifestations of Islamic pragmatism emerged. This was organized during the presidency of Hashemi Rafsanjani. The model of Islamic pragmatism was aimed at increasing national power through international interaction. Since 1997, the ground has been created for the activation of discourse forms related to the Islamic democratic orientation. Each of these discourse forms pursued a specific national role;

However, in the first decades of the Islamic Revolution, there were signs of radicalism and Ideological orientation in Iran's foreign policy, in other words, signs of Islamic ideological discourse can be seen in foreign policy; But the change in the internal structure as well as the processes related to the international system can be considered as a factor in transforming the Islamic ideological discourse. In the modern era, manifestations of the discourse of de-escalation emerged. This discourse has been focused on cooperation with the regional and international environment.

=== The beginning ===
The "De-escalation policy of the Islamic Republic of Iran" in foreign policy began in 1988. During this period, a change have been made in the "orientation" and "national role" of Iran's foreign policy. This can be considered a reflection of economic, strategic and security needs. Based on the necessities of the new period, also a change have been made in the priorities of Iran's foreign and economic policy. The first wave of de-escalation can be considered as a factor in rebuilding Iran's relations with the countries around of the Persian Gulf and the Middle East. The second wave of de-escalation began in 1997. During this period, conditions were provided to improve the level of cooperation between Iran and European countries. The main focus of the second wave of de-escalation was on the expansion of the "confidence-building" process. Iran's economic and strategic cooperation with European countries was enhanced. During this period, extensive efforts were made for "effective participation" of Iran with other countries in the economic and strategic fields. This trend was accompanied by reversals in the 2000s.

=== The approach of relative realism ===
Building trust can be considered a continuation of the policy of de-escalation. With the design of discourse formats, a serious ideal model was formed in the Islamic Republic of Iran and signs of a democratic Islamic discourse emerged in the new atmosphere. Although there have been changes in Iran's foreign policy, it can be considered a continuation of previous discourses. After the election of Mohammad Khatami in August 1997 as the fifth president of Iran and the outline of the new president's plans, the expansion of foreign relations and the handling of foreign issues and affairs continued within the framework of the approach of relative realism. With the difference that the way of expression and the way of dealing with other countries changed and the policy of economic adjustment and government industrial development gave way to political development and in foreign relations, accepting global pluralism means rejecting unipolar system and accepting equality of other cultures. It became the main axis of foreign policy and on this basis, another wave of de-escalation in Iran's foreign policy began.

Achieving such goals was not possible in the short term; Because the general opposition of the international system regarding Iran continued. Although in Khatami's presidential term, Iran's economic policy and security behavior pattern were democratic and cooperative in nature; But evidence suggests that the international system had relatively limited flexibility with Iran. Thus, the model of confidence-building and de-escalation led to the formation of signs of a security crisis in Iran.

=== The non-aligned revisionist ===
With the election of Mahmoud Ahmadinejad as the sixth president of Iran, Iran's foreign policy continued with the slogan of de-escalation and peace in the region and the world. During this presidential term, the foreign policy of the Islamic Republic of Iran was designed based on the principles of de-escalation, justice, mutual understanding and the spread of peace and peaceful coexistence in the region and the world.

Mahmoud Ahmadinejad's foreign policy can be called a non-aligned revisionist. During his eight years, especially in his early years, he tried to fight the current unipolar system by challenging the current hegemony and order in the world system. At the same time, he had invested heavily in the "Non-Aligned Movements" and was trying to create a union among these groups to go to face with the present order. Emphasizing the inefficiency of the current order, Mahmoud Ahmadinejad sought to both challenge the superpower and call international organizations inefficient. Critics say Ahmadinejad's approach has been a source of tension in Iran's foreign policy.

=== Solve economic problems ===
After the election of Hassan Rouhani in August 2013 as the seventh president of Iran, he made de-escalation in foreign policy, especially in relation to the United States, his top priority. According to Rouhani, given the country's need for foreign investment to solve economic problems on the one hand and the US domination of world companies and economic institutions on the other hand, it is necessary for Iran's foreign policy to be directed towards de-escalation with the United States. The center of gravity and the main focus of de-escalation with Western countries, especially the United States, was considered the most important Rouhani strategic plan. Rouhani's goal in adopting a de-escalation policy is to promote security, development and normalization of Iran's foreign policy; But this policy has been fundamentally challenged by Trump's rise to power, the change of executive elites in the United States, US hostile policy toward the Islamic Republic of Iran, and the intensification of opposition activities at the national, regional, and international levels.

To solve economic problems, Rouhani sought to make Iran's foreign policy focus on relations with the United States and cooperation with that country. Rouhani is known in the West as a pragmatic politician who suspended Iran's nuclear program during Khatami's presidency. This, together with the election of Mohammad Javad Zarif as foreign minister, has led Iran's foreign policy to reduce tensions with the West, especially the United States. The election of Hassan Rouhani as president provided a good opportunity to negotiate with the United States. From Rouhani's point of view, the hostile relationship between Iran and the United States is not the right path. All of this points to his de-escalating foreign policy.
