= Burundi–Iran relations =

Bilateral relations

- Burundi: Iran

Burundi–Iran relations refers to the bilateral relations between the Republic of Burundi and the Islamic Republic of Iran. Burundi and Iran established diplomatic relations on 31 March 1985. The nations conducted little diplomacy with one another, though Burundi imported crude oil in the private sector in the following decades. In the late 2010s, the countries made minor agreements in the fields of mining, rural development, trade policy, and agriculture.

In April 2022, Ambassador of Burundi Gérard Ntahorwaroye Bikebako met with former Iranian President Ebrahim Raisi. In May that year he also met with Iran's Minister of Foreign Affairs, Hossein Amir-Abdollahian.

== Diplomatic missions ==
Burundi is represented in Iran through its embassy in Ankara. Iran is represented in Burundi through its embassy in Kampala.
