= Portuguese in Iceland =

Icelandic Portuguese
Luso-islandeses (Portuguese) "Portúgalskt fólk á Íslandi (Icelandic)
- (Iceland) (Portugal)
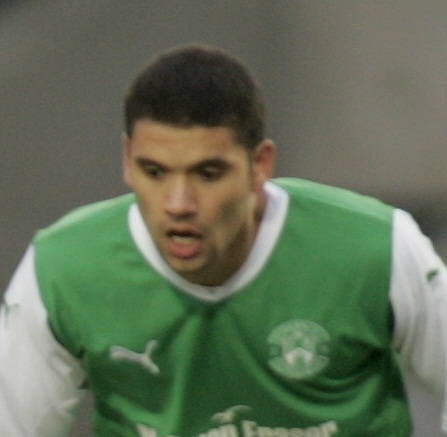
- Victor Pálsson, possibly the best known Icelander of Portuguese descent

Total population
- 1,528

Languages
- Icelandic, Portuguese

Religion
- Predominantly Christianity (Roman Catholicism), Irreligion

Related ethnic groups
- Other Portuguese people, Portuguese in Denmark, Portuguese in Finland, Portuguese in Norway, Portuguese in Sweden

Portuguese in Iceland (Icelandic: Portúgalskt fólk á Íslandi) are citizens and residents of Iceland who are of Portuguese descent.

Portuguese people in Iceland (also known as Portuguese Icelanders/ Icelandic-Portuguese Community or, in Portuguese, known as Portugueses na Islândia / Comunidade portuguesa na Islândia / Luso-islandeses) are the citizens or residents of Iceland whose ethnic origins lie in Portugal.

Portuguese Icelanders are Portuguese-born citizens with an Icelandic citizenship or Icelandic-born citizens of Portuguese ancestry or citizenship.

About 1,406 Portuguese people live in Iceland as of 2022. In addition, 122 people of Portuguese descent have acquired Icelandic citizenship since 2000, for a total of at least 1,528 people of recent Portuguese background. The Portuguese represent 0.39% of the country's population.

== History ==
The Portuguese community in the country has experienced considerable growth, especially after Brexit. Portuguese emigrants are in fact leaving the United Kingdom for Nordic countries: most of them are highly qualified and aged between 20 and 40, looking for better quality of life and economic stability. Portuguese emigration has increased particularly in the last years and in 2022 alone 360 Portuguese entered the country. The two countries maintain a strong relationship of mutual respect and are both NATO members.

== Footballers ==
In recent years many Portuguese international footballers have moved to Iceland to play for Norwegian clubs: in 2023 these included Braima Candé (Knattspyrnufélagið Ægir), Ivo Braz(Knattspyrnufélagið Ægir), Tiago Fernandes (Fram Reykjavík), Rafael Victor (Njarðvík) and Rodrigo Dias (KÁ Ásvellir).

== Remittances ==
The Portuguese community in Iceland retains strong ties with its homeland and, between 2000 and 2021, it has sent approximately 7.1 million euros (€) to Portugal in remittances. In the same timeframe, Icelanders in Portugal (numbering around 170 individuals) have sent approximately €0.97 million to Iceland.

== Portuguese language ==
As of today, the Portuguese are part of a wider Portuguese-speaking community in Iceland, comprising around 170 people from PALOP countries (the majority being from Angola or from Cape Verde), Timor-Leste or Macau and around 290 Brazilians.

People from CPLP countries thus number around 2,000 people, accounting for 0.52% of the population of Iceland. Despite being – in absolute numbers – the smallest immigrant community of people coming from CPLP countries amongst the ones found in Nordic countries, people from Portuguese-speaking countries have, in Iceland, their largest share on the total population when looking at the countries of the Nordic Council.

In Denmark there are around 11,000 CPLP nationals (0.19% of the country's population), in Finland there are a little more than 5,000 CPLP nationals (0.09% of the country's population), while in Norway there are around 25,300 CPLP nationals (0.38% of the population) and in Sweden 26,700 (0.25% of the population).

== Notable people ==
- Victor Pálsson (1991): Icelandic footballer

== See also ==
- Denmark–Portugal relations
- Finland–Portugal relations
- Iceland–Portugal relations
- Norway–Portugal relations
- Portugal–Sweden relations
- Portuguese in Denmark
- Portuguese in Finland
- Portuguese in Norway
- Portuguese in Sweden
