= Portuguese in Denmark =

Danish Portuguese
Luso-dinamarqueses (Portuguese) Dansk portugisisk (Danish)
- (Denmark) (Portugal)

Total population
- 4,476

Languages
- Danish, Portuguese

Religion
- Predominantly Christianity (Roman Catholicism), Irreligion

Related ethnic groups
- Other Portuguese people, Portuguese in Finland, Portuguese in Iceland, Portuguese in Norway, Portuguese in Sweden

Portuguese in Denmark (Danish: portugisisk i Danmark) are citizens and residents of Denmark and its dependencies who are of Portuguese descent.

Portuguese in Denmark (also known as Portuguese Danes/ Danish-Portuguese Community or, in Portuguese, known as Portugueses na Dinamarca / Comunidade portuguesa na Dinamarca / Luso-dinamarqueses) are the citizens or residents of Denmark whose ethnic origins lie in Portugal.

Portuguese Danes are Portuguese-born citizens with a Danish citizenship or Danish-born citizens of Portuguese ancestry or citizenship.

There are approximately 4,476 Portuguese people living in Denmark as of 2021. They represent 0.08% of the country's population.

== History ==
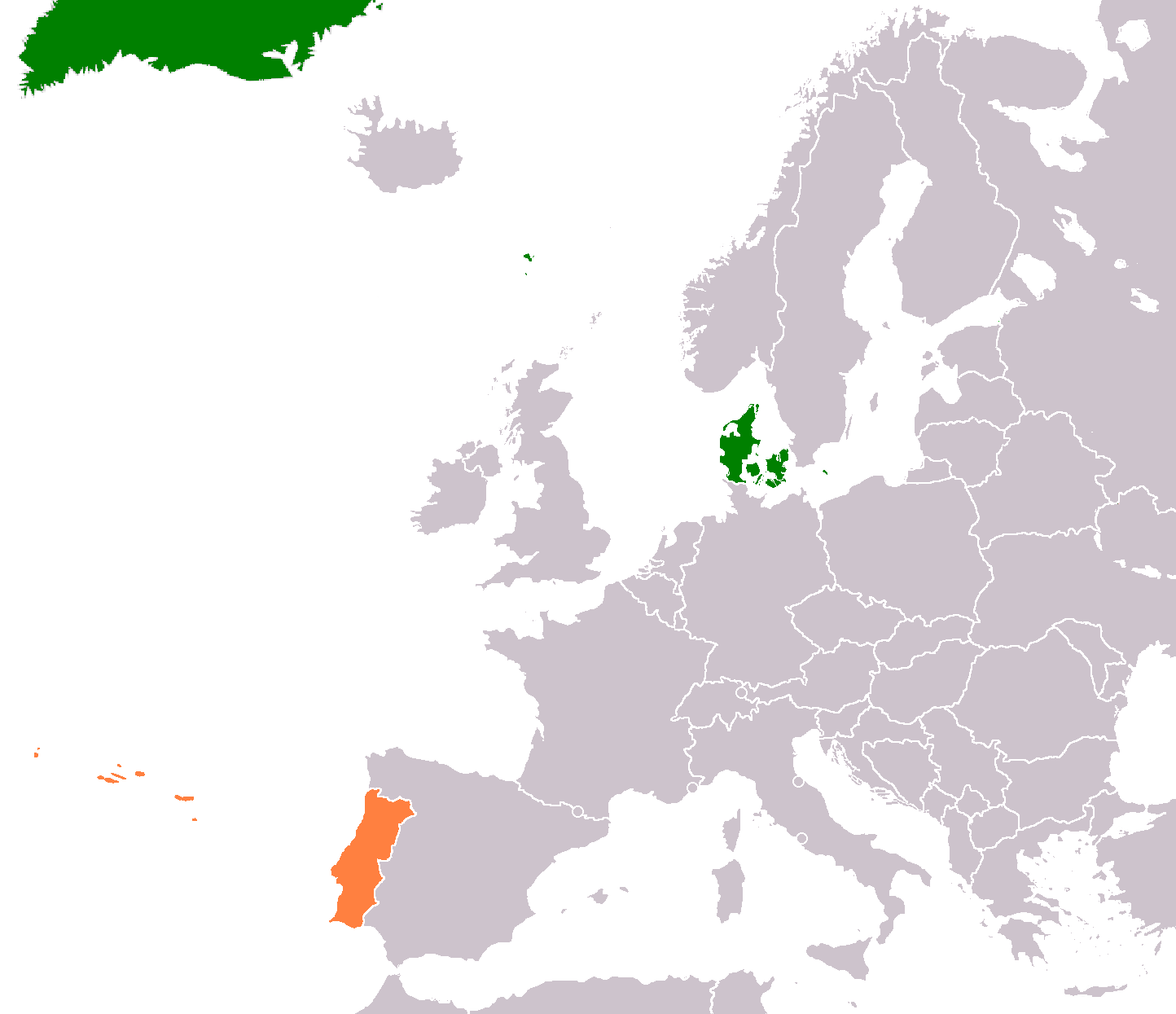
Map showing the location of the two countries within Europe

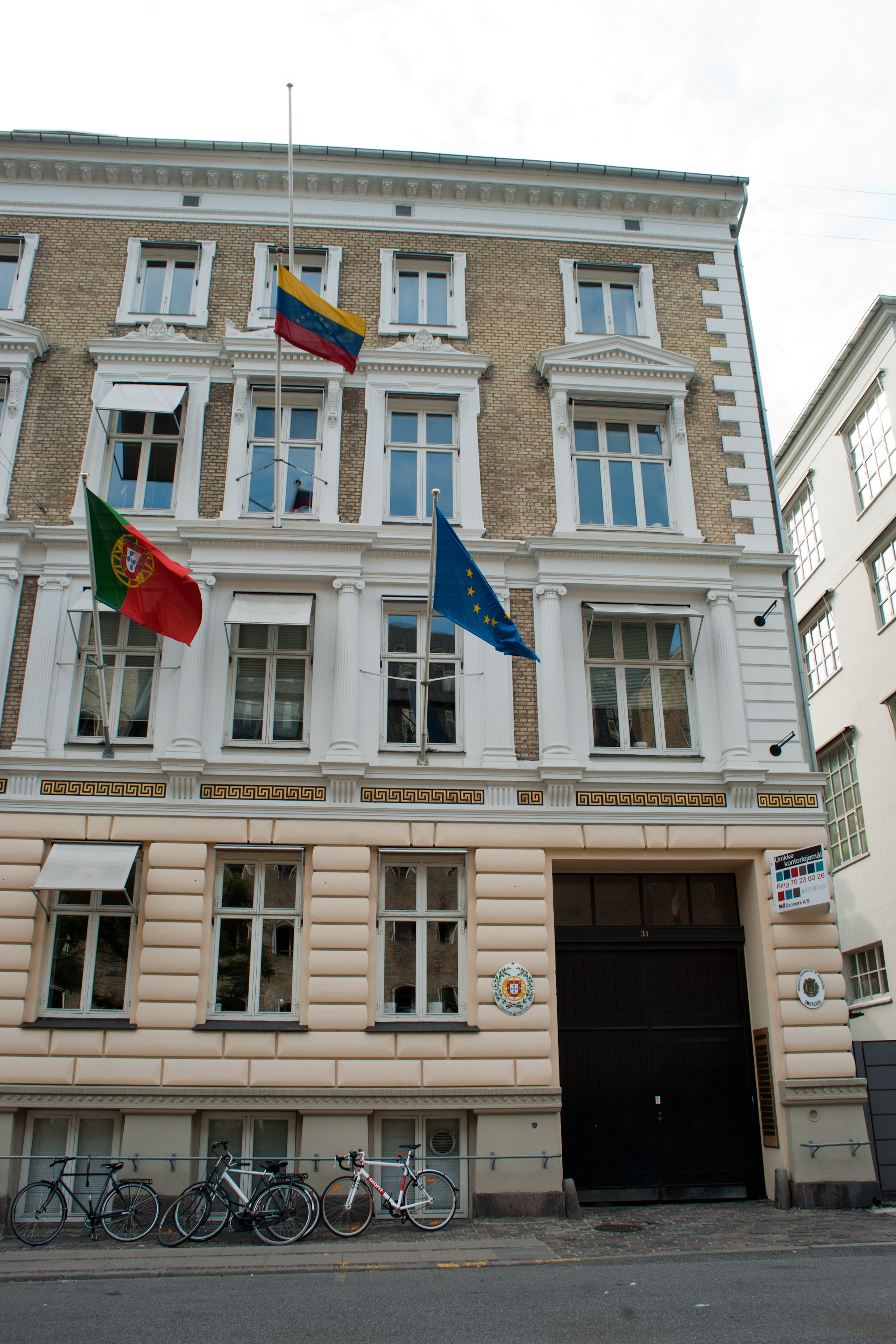
Portuguese embassy in Copenhagen

The Portuguese community in the country has experienced considerable growth, especially after Brexit. Portuguese emigrants are in fact leaving the United Kingdom for Nordic countries: most of them are highly qualified and aged between 20 and 40, looking for better quality of life and economic stability. Portuguese emigration towards Denmark didn't slow down even amidst the COVID-19 pandemic.

There are also Portuguese living in territories of the Danish Realm other than metropolitan Denmark: in 2023 there were 8 Portuguese-born residents in Faroe Islands and 10 in Greenland.

== Footballers ==
In recent years many Portuguese international footballers have moved to Denmark to play for Danish clubs. In 2023 these included: Carlos Ferreira (in the Faroe Islands, Skála ÍF), André Monteiro (Vejle), Anderson Rosso de Sena (Brabrand), Pedro Ferreira (AaB) and Diogo Gonçalves (Copenhagen).

== Remittances ==
The Portuguese community in Denmark retains strong ties with its homeland and, between 2000 and 2021, it has sent approximately 92.84 million euros (€) to Portugal in remittances. In the same timeframe, Danes in Portugal (numbering around 1,600 individuals) have sent approximately 11.13 million euros (€) to Denmark.

== Portuguese language ==
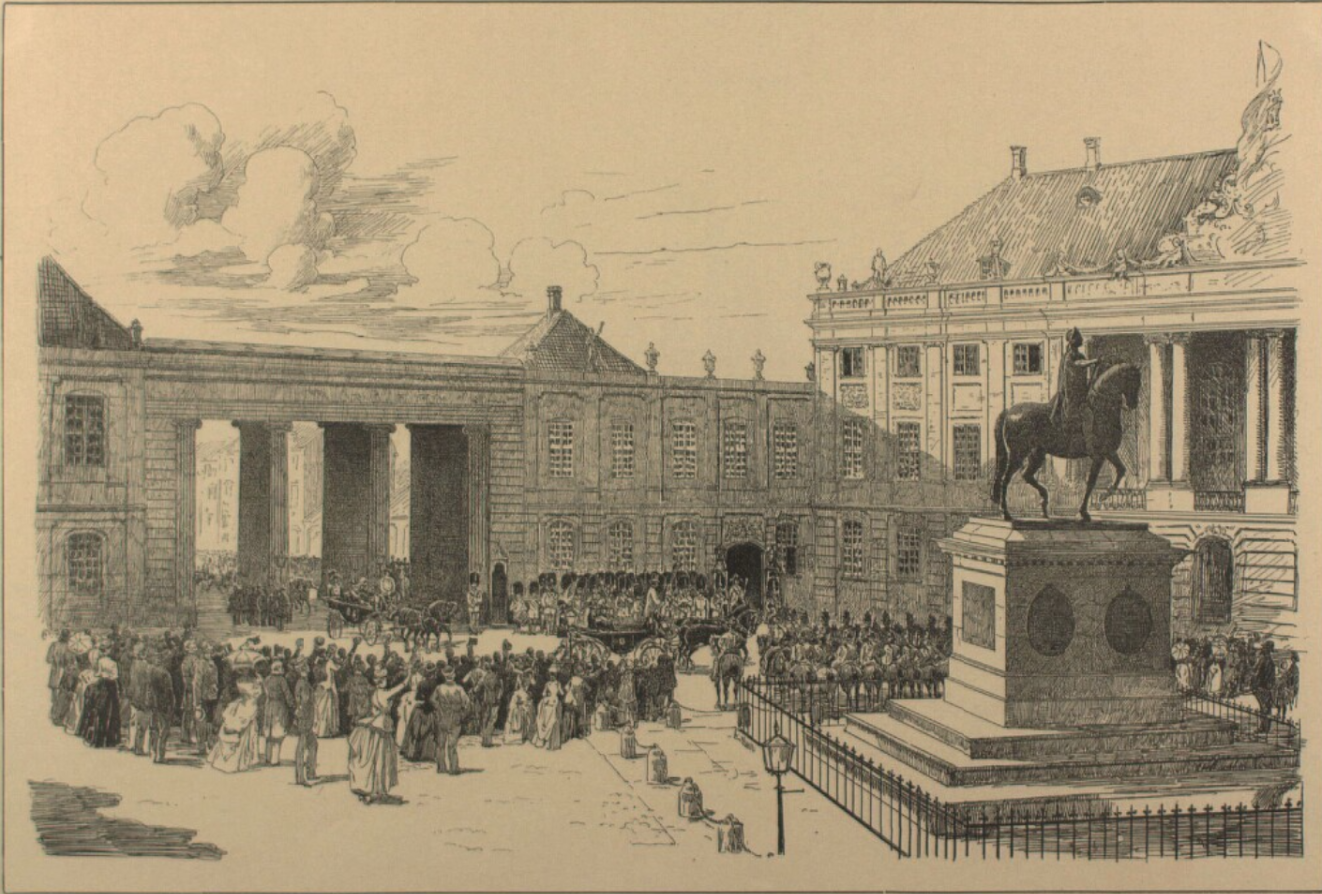
King Luís of Portugal visits Copenhagen

As of today, the Portuguese are part of a wider Portuguese-speaking community in Denmark, comprising around 720 people from PALOP countries (the overwhelming majority being from Angola or from Mozambique), Timor-Leste or Macau and 5,800 Brazilians.

People from CPLP countries thus number around 11,000 people, accounting for 0.19% of the population of Denmark. Despite being small, the immigrant community of people coming from CPLP countries in Denmark is quite visible when compared to the ones in other Nordic countries: in Finland there are a little more than 5,000 CPLP nationals (0.09% of the country's population), in Iceland there are around 2,000 CPLP nationals (0.52% of the country's population), while in Norway there are around 25,300 CPLP nationals (0.38% of the population) and in Sweden 26,700 (0.25% of the population).

== Notable people ==
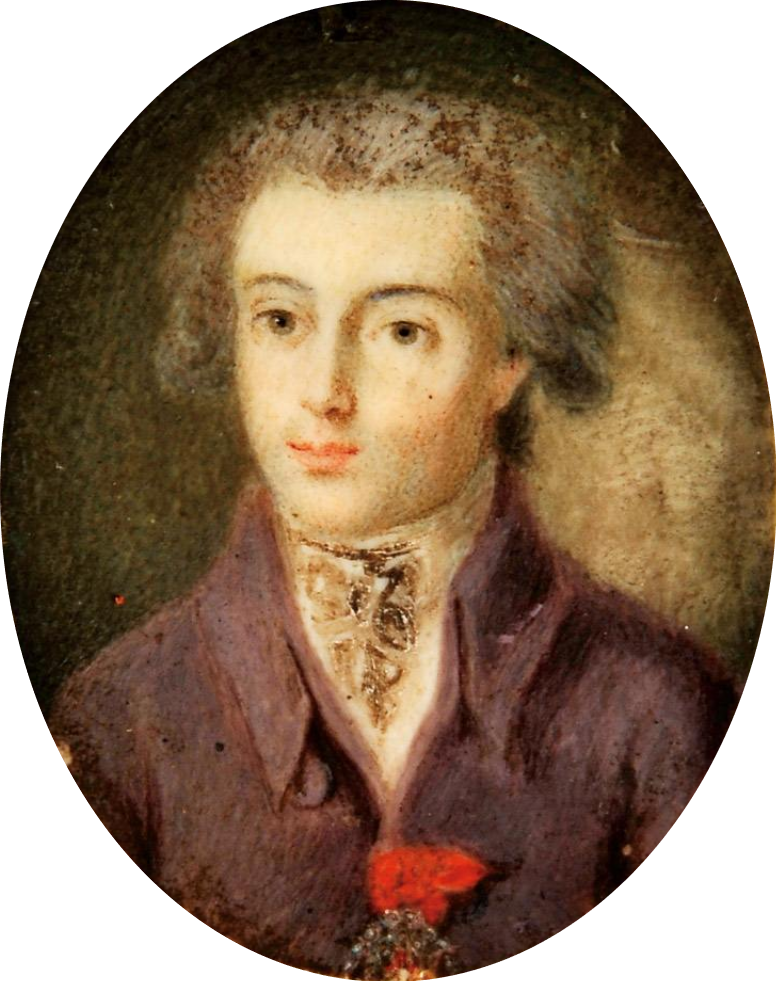
Alexandre de Sousa Holstein, Pedro de Sousa Holstein's father and Portuguese ambassador to Denmark in the 18th century.

- Berengaria of Portugal (1198–1221): Portuguese infanta (princess) and Queen of Denmark, by marriage to King Valdemar II
- Christopher I of Denmark (1219–1259): King of Denmark between 1252 and 1259. He was the son of Valdemar II of Denmark by his second wife, Berengaria of Portugal
- Christopher, Duke of Lolland (1341–1363): great-great-grandson of Christopher I of Denmark
- Eleanor of Portugal, Queen of Denmark (1211–1231): Portuguese infanta, the only daughter of Afonso II of Portugal and Urraca of Castile, Queen of Portugal. Eleanor was Queen of Denmark by marriage to Valdemar the Young
- Eric IV of Denmark (1216–1250): King of Denmark from 1241 until his death in 1250, son of Berengaria
- Erika de Casier (1990): Portuguese-Danish singer, songwriter, and record producer
- Lukas Fernandes (1993): retired Danish footballer
- Emilie da Fonseca (1803–1884): Norwegian-Danish stage actor and opera singer
- Ida Henriette da Fonseca (1802–1858): Danish opera singer and composer
- Margaret I of Denmark (1353–1412): Queen regnant of Denmark, Norway, and Sweden (which included Finland) from the late 1380s until her death, and the founder of the Kalmar Union that joined the Scandinavian kingdoms together for over a century. great-great-granddaughter of Christopher I of Denmark
- Pedro Oliveira (1971): Portuguese academic
- Camille Pissarro (1830–1903): Danish-French Impressionist and Neo-Impressionist painter

== See also ==
- Denmark-Portugal relations
- Finland-Portugal relations
- Iceland-Portugal relations
- Norway-Portugal relations
- Portugal–Sweden relations
- Portuguese in Finland
- Portuguese in Iceland
- Portuguese in Norway
- Portuguese in Sweden
- Portuguese in Germany
