= Portuguese in Sweden =

Swedish Portuguese
Luso-suecos (Portuguese) Svenskportugiser (Swedish)
- (Sweden) (Portugal)

Total population
- 5,033; 0.05% of the Swedish population (2020)

Languages
- Swedish, Portuguese

Religion
- Predominantly Christianity (Roman Catholicism), Irreligion

Related ethnic groups
- Other Portuguese people, Portuguese in Denmark, Portuguese in Finland, Portuguese in Iceland, Portuguese in Norway

Portuguese in Sweden (Swedish: Svensksportugiser) are citizens and residents of Sweden who are of Portuguese descent.

Portuguese Swedes are Portuguese-born citizens with a Swedish citizenship or Swedish-born citizens of Portuguese ancestry or citizenship.

There are approximately 5,033 Portuguese people living in Sweden as of 2022. The Portuguese represent 0.05% of the country's population.

== History ==
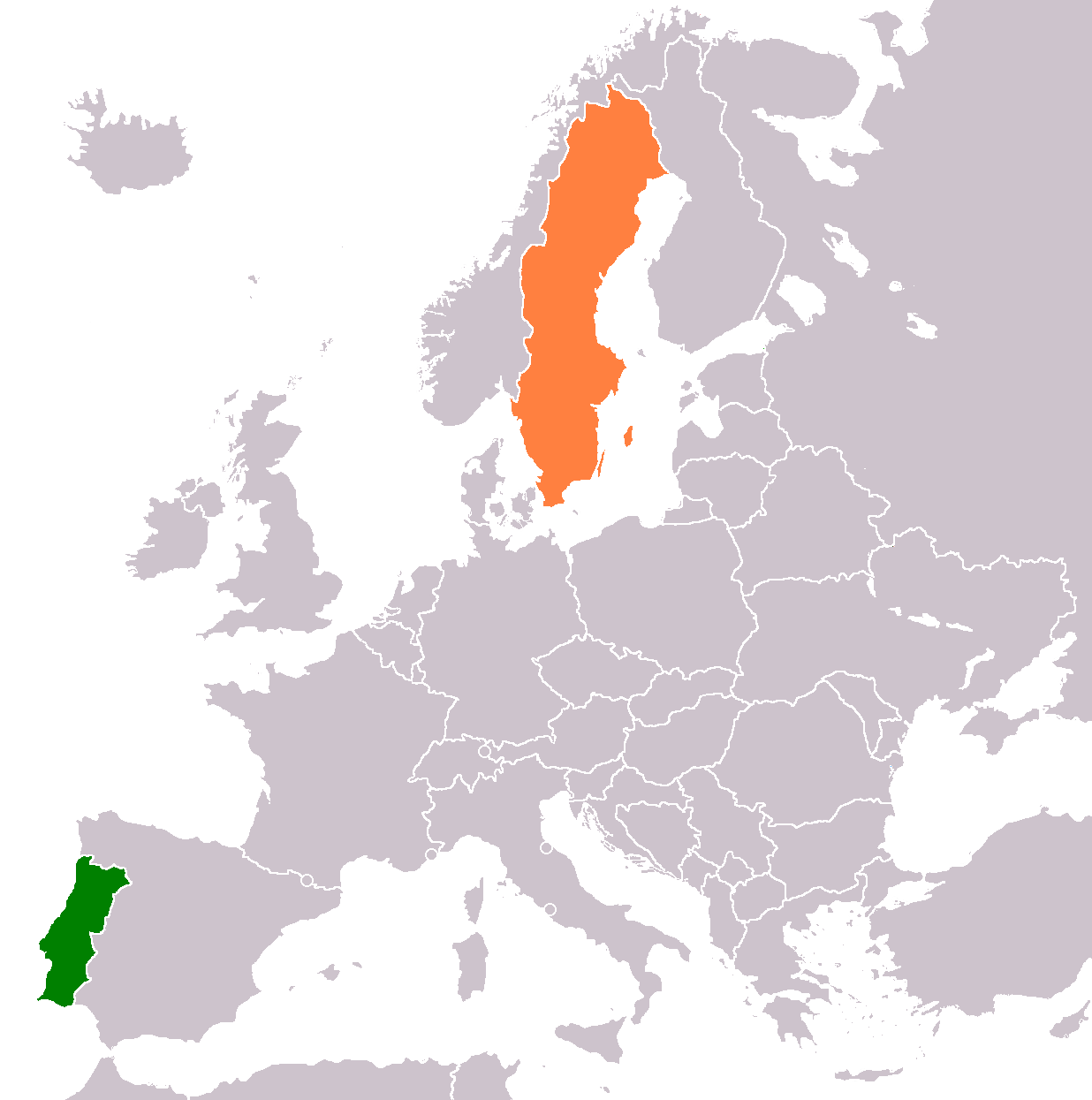
Map showing the location of the two countries within Europe

The Portuguese community in the country has experienced considerable growth, especially after Brexit. Portuguese emigrants are in fact leaving the United Kingdom for Nordic countries: most of them are highly qualified and aged between 20 and 40, looking for better quality of life and economic stability. The influx of Portuguese migrants towards the country is steadily increasing and there are 5 Portuguese associations in the country. Both countries are EU and NATO members.

== Footballers ==
In recent years many Portuguese international footballers have moved to Sweden to play for Swedish clubs. In 2023 these included: Ieltsin Camões (IK Brage), Filipe Sissé (Varbergs BoIS), Mamadu Djau (Örebro), Luís Canina (IFK Luleå) and Kevin Cerqueira (BK Häcken).

== Remittances ==
The Portuguese community in Sweden retains strong ties with its homeland and, between 2000 and 2021, it has sent about 162.5 million euros (€) to Portugal in remittances. In the same timeframe, Swedes in Portugal (numbering around 5,700 individuals) have sent approximately 19.81 million euros to Sweden.

== Portuguese language ==
Engraving of the walls and castle of the city of Lagos, in the Algarve region, in Portugal. National Archives of Sweden (Riksarkivet)

the Portuguese are part of a wider Portuguese-speaking community in Sweden, comprising around 1,920 people from PALOP countries (the majority being from Angola or from Cape Verde), Timor-Leste and Macau and around 20,000 Brazilians.

People from CPLP countries thus number around 27,000 accounting for 0.25% of the population of Sweden.

The immigrant community of people coming from CPLP countries in Sweden is the largest found among the Nordic countries: in Finland there are a little more than 5,000 CPLP nationals (0.09% of the country's population), in Denmark there are around 11,000 CPLP nationals (0.19% of the country's population) while in Iceland there are around 2,000 CPLP nationals (0.52% of the country's population), and in Norway there are around 25,300 CPLP nationals (0.38% of the population).

== Notable people ==
- Alexandra Coelho Ahndoril (1966): Swedish writer
- André (1971): Swedish-French artist best known for his work in graffiti
- Carin da Silva (1984): Swedish-Portuguese singer, professional dancer and television presenter
- Prince Carl Philip (1979): Duke of Värmland, only son and the second of three children of King Carl XVI Gustaf and Queen Silvia
- Princess Madeleine (1982): Duchess of Hälsingland and Gästrikland
- Paulo Mendonça: Swedish funk guitarist songwriter and composer
- Malin Olsson (1982): Swedish television presenter and a former singer and beauty queen
- Queen Silvia (1943): Queen of Sweden since 1976. Of Brazilian-German descent, amongst her ancestors there is also Afonso III of Portugal
- Carlos Strandberg (1996): Swedish professional footballer
- Christopher Telo (1989): Swedish footballer
- César Vidal (1970): Swedish singer and lead singer for the band Caesars
- Victoria, Crown Princess of Sweden (1977): Crown Princess of Sweden, Duchess of Västergötland and heir apparent to the Swedish throne

== See also ==
- Denmark-Portugal relations
- Finland-Portugal relations
- Iceland-Portugal relations
- Norway-Portugal relations
- Portugal–Sweden relations
- Portuguese in Denmark
- Portuguese in Finland
- Portuguese in Iceland
- Portuguese in Norway
