= Portuguese in Finland =

Finnish Portuguese
Luso-finlandeses (Portuguese) Portugalilaisia Suomessa (Finnish) Portugisiska i Finland (Swedish)
- (Finland) (Portugal)

Total population
- 1,207

Languages
- Finnish, Portuguese

Religion
- Predominantly Christianity (Roman Catholicism), Irreligion

Related ethnic groups
- Other Portuguese people, Portuguese in Denmark, Portuguese in Iceland, Portuguese in Norway, Portuguese in Sweden

Portuguese in Finland (Finnish: Portugalilaisia Suomessa) are citizens and residents of Finland who are of Portuguese descent.

Portuguese in Finland (also known as Portuguese Finns/ Finnish-Portuguese Community or, in Portuguese, known as Portugueses na Finlândia/ Comunidade portuguesa na Finlândia/ Luso-finlandeses) are the citizens or residents of Finland whose ethnic origins lie in Portugal.

Portuguese Finns are Portuguese-born citizens with a Finnish citizenship or Finnish-born citizens of Portuguese ancestry or citizenship.

There are approximately 1,033 Portuguese people living in Finland as of 2023. In addition, there are 174 people with double Portuguese-Finnish citizenship living in the country, for a total of 1,207 Portuguese citizens. The Portuguese represent 0.02% of the country's population.

== History ==
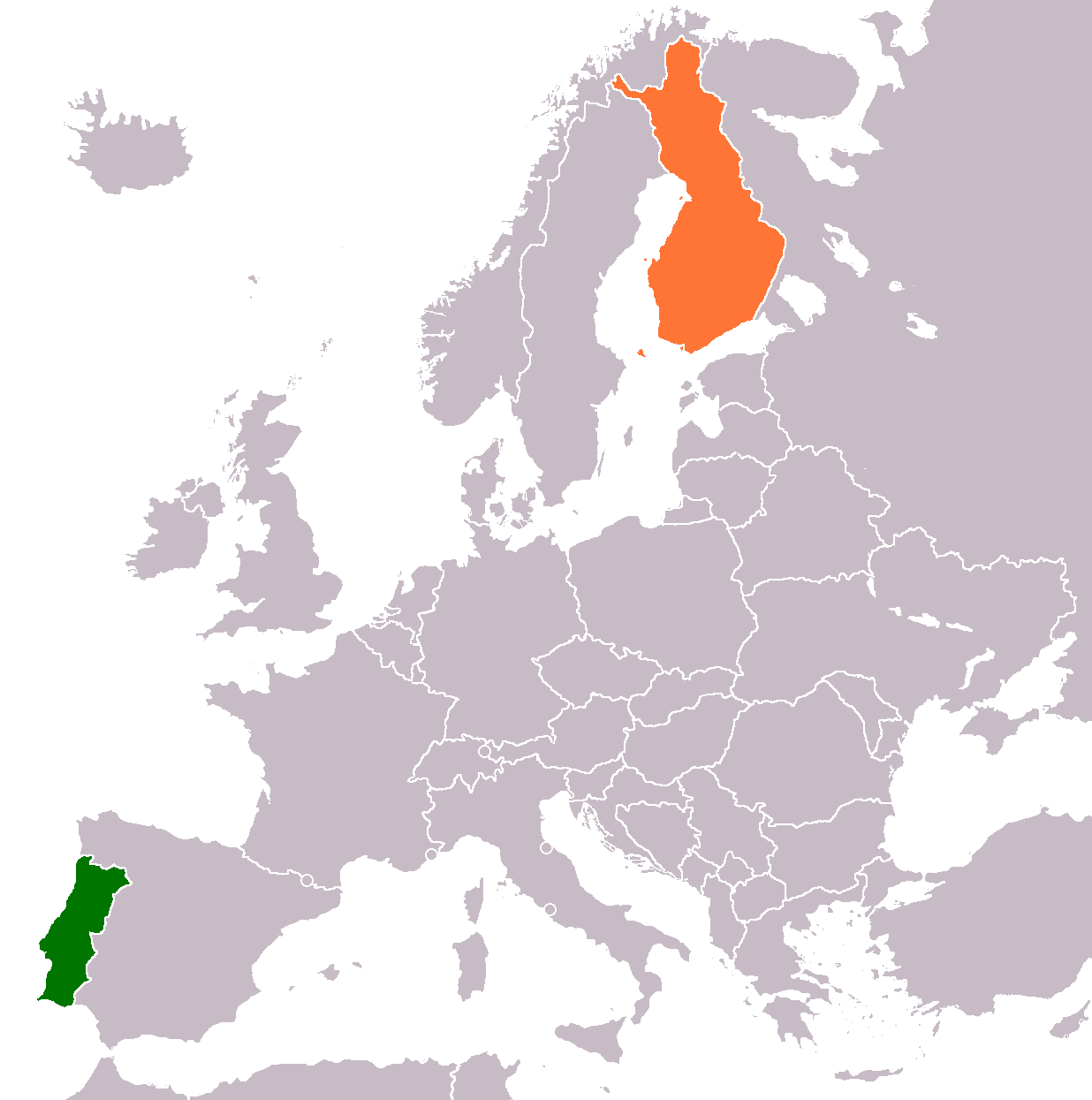
Map showing the location of the two countries within Europe

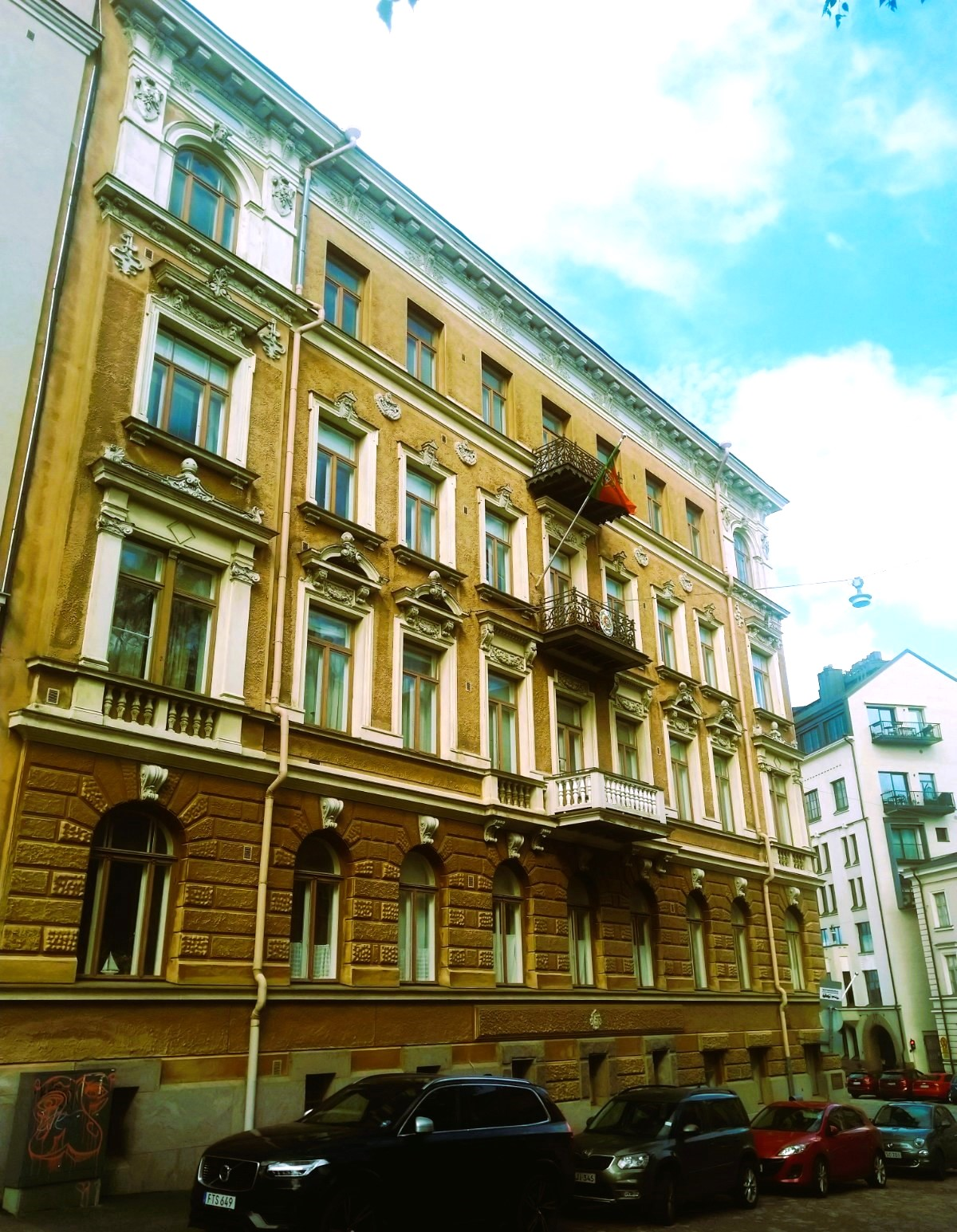
Residence of the Ambassador of Portugal in Helsinki

The Portuguese community in the country has experienced considerable growth, especially after Brexit. Portuguese emigrants are in fact leaving the United Kingdom for Nordic countries: most of them are highly qualified and aged between 20 and 40, looking for better quality of life and economic stability. Portuguese emigrants highly appreciate the country high standard of living as well as the attitude of Finns towards happiness. On the other hand, Portuguese emigrants often complain about the rigid climate of the country. Both countries are EU and NATO members.

== Footballers ==
In recent years many Portuguese international footballers have moved to Finland to play for Finnish clubs. In 2023 these included: Danny (Peimari United), Luís Freitas Jr. (HauPa), José Ferreira (Kajaanin Haka), Gerson Lima (Ekenäs), Babacar Fati (SJK), Bubacar Djaló (Lahti).

In addition, in 2023 coach Hugo Henriques was also active in Finland.

== Remittances ==
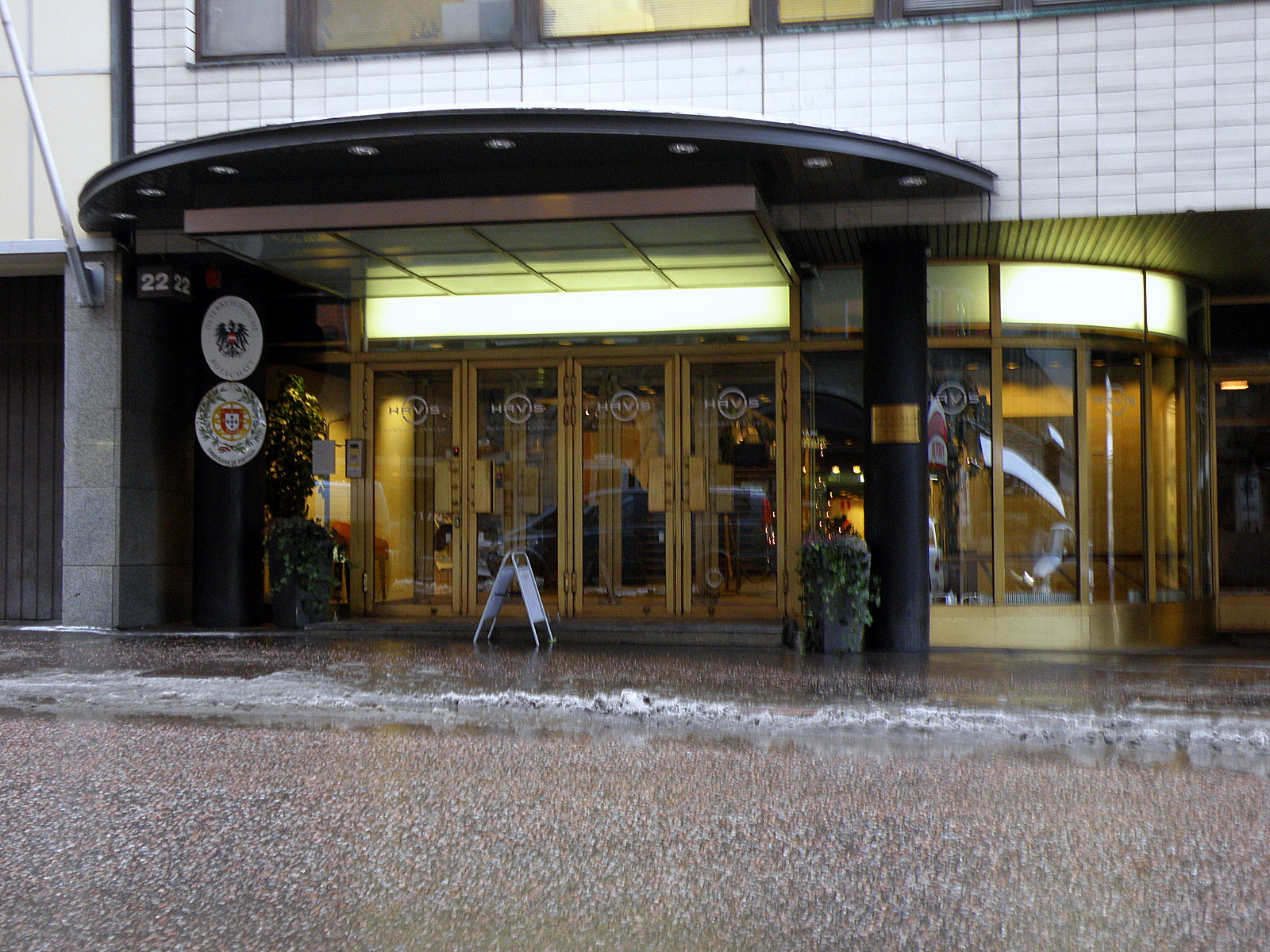
Portuguese embassy in Helsinki

The Portuguese community in Finland retains strong ties with its homeland and, between 2000 and 2021, it has sent approximately 34.06 million euros (€) to Portugal in remittances. In the same timeframe, Finns in Portugal (numbering around 1,200 individuals) have sent approximately 5.17 million euros (€) to Finland.

== Portuguese language ==
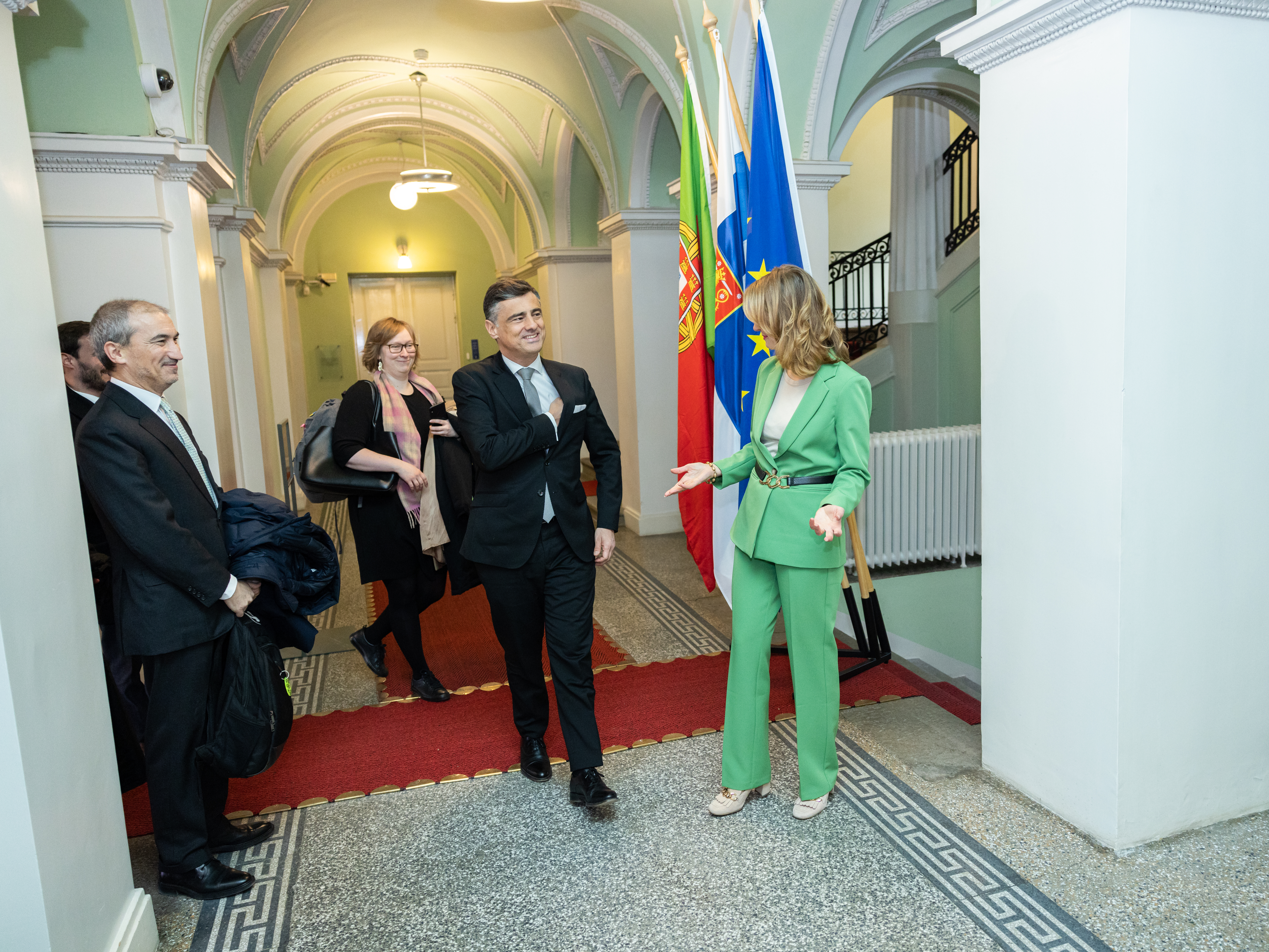
Minister Tuppurainen and Portuguese Secretary of State for European Affairs Tiago Antunes met in Helsinki in February 2023

As of today, the Portuguese are part of a wider Portuguese-speaking community in Finland, comprising around 670 people from PALOP countries (the overwhelming majority being from Angola or from Mozambique), Timor-Leste or Macau and 3,115 Brazilians.

People from CPLP countries thus number around 5,000 people, accounting for 0.09% of the population of Finland. The immigrant community of people coming from CPLP countries in Finland is amongst the smallest found in the Nordic countries and the smallest when dealing with incidence on the total population. In fact, in Denmark there are around 11,000 CPLP nationals (0.19% of the country's population), in Iceland there are around 2,000 CPLP nationals (0.52% of the country's population), in Norway there are around 25,300 CPLP nationals (0.38% of the population) and in Sweden 26,700 (0.25% of the population).

== Notable people ==
- Duarte Tammilehto (1990): Portuguese-Finnish former footballer
- Anna Abreu (1990): Portuguese-Finnish singer. She has certified record sales surpassing 190,000 copies, which places her also among the 100 best-selling music artists of all time in Finland.
- Sara Nunes (1980): Portuguese-Finnish singer
- Diogo Tomas (1997): Finnish footballer. He plays for the Finland national team.

== See also ==
- Finland–Portugal relations
- Portuguese diaspora
- Immigration to Finland
- Portuguese in Denmark
- Portuguese in Iceland
- Portuguese in Norway
- Portuguese in Sweden
