= Portuguese in Norway =

Norwegian Portuguese
Luso-noruegueses (Portuguese) portugisiske nordmenn (Norwegian)
- (Norway) (Portugal)

Total population
- 4,524 to 9,000; 0.08%-0.16% of the Norwegian population

Regions with significant populations
- Oslo

Languages
- Norwegian, Portuguese

Religion
- Predominantly Christianity (Roman Catholicism), Irreligion

Related ethnic groups
- Other Portuguese people, Portuguese in Denmark, Portuguese in Finland, Portuguese in Iceland, Portuguese in Sweden

Portuguese in Norway (Norwegian: portugisiske nordmenn) are citizens and residents of Norway and its external territories who are of Portuguese descent.

Portuguese map from the 16th century depicting Norway. National Maritime Museum, Greenwich, London

Portuguese in Norway (also known as Portuguese Norwegians/ Norwegian-Portuguese Community or, in Portuguese, known as Portugueses na Noruega / Comunidade portuguesa na Noruega / Luso-noruegueses) are the citizens or residents of Norway whose ethnic origins lie in Portugal.

Portuguese Norwegians are Portuguese-born citizens with a Norwegian citizenship or Norwegian-born citizens of Portuguese ancestry or citizenship.

== Demographics ==
According to official Portuguese estimates, 9,000 Portuguese people live in Norway as of 2020. On the other hand, according to official Norwegian estimates, there were 4,524 Portuguese in Norway in 2023. The discrepancy in numbers could be due to the fact that many Portuguese hold multiple citizenship, for instance, they are Portuguese-Brazilians or Luso-Indians. They thus represent between 0.08% and 0.16% of the country's population.

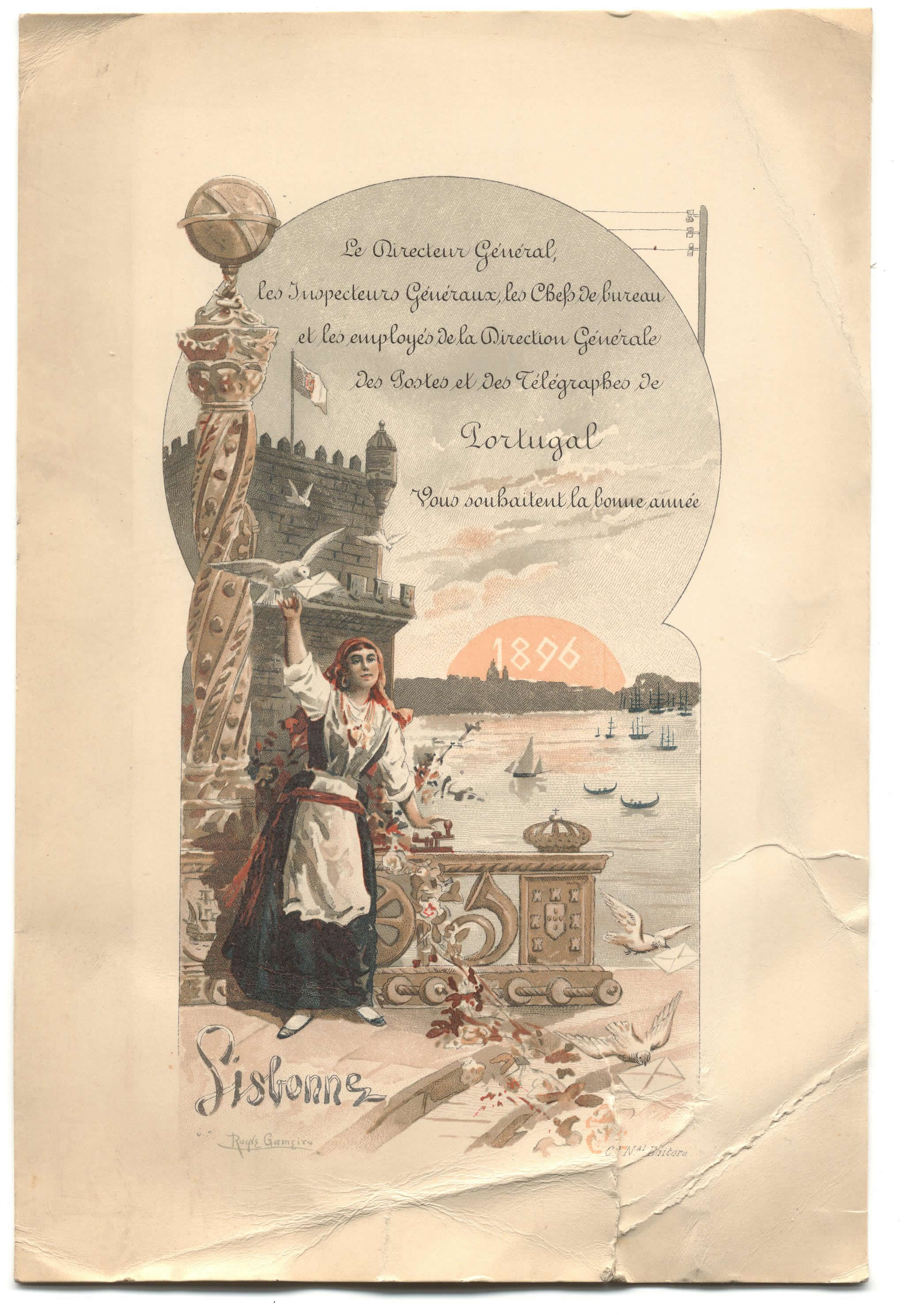
New Year card from Portugal dating from 1896. National Archives of Norway (Riksarkivet)

== History ==
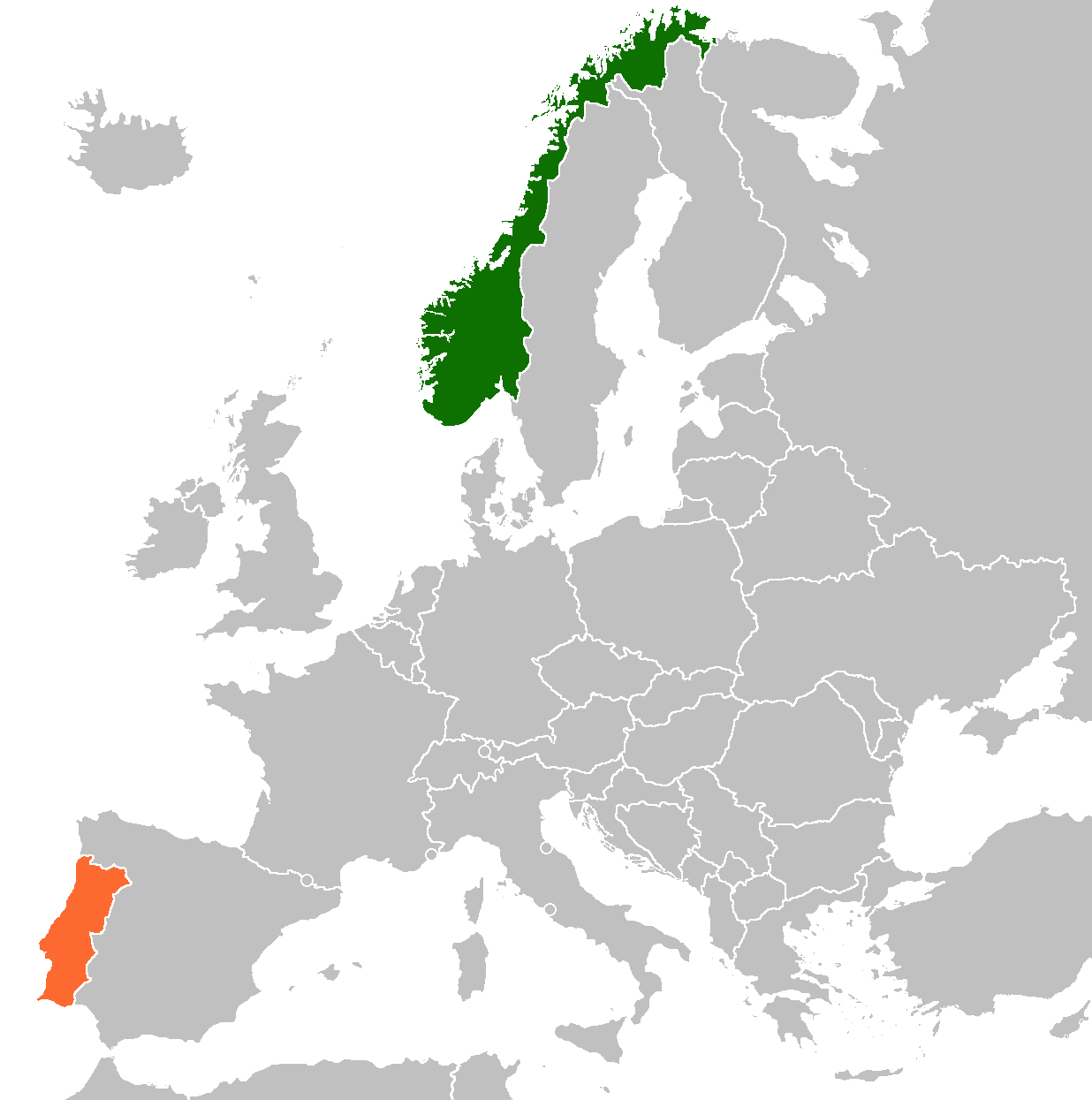
Map showing the location of the two countries within Europe

The Portuguese community in Norway has experienced considerable growth, especially after Brexit. Portuguese emigrants are in fact leaving the United Kingdom for Nordic countries: most of them are highly qualified and aged between 20 and 40, looking for better quality of life and economic stability.

Many Portuguese are opting for Norway especially after 2009, even though integration is often difficult because of cultural differences, language requirements and lack of job opportunities. Most Portuguese leaving for Norway are highly educated.

The two countries enjoy friendly relationships and mutual trust, witnessing increasing trade as well.

== Footballers ==
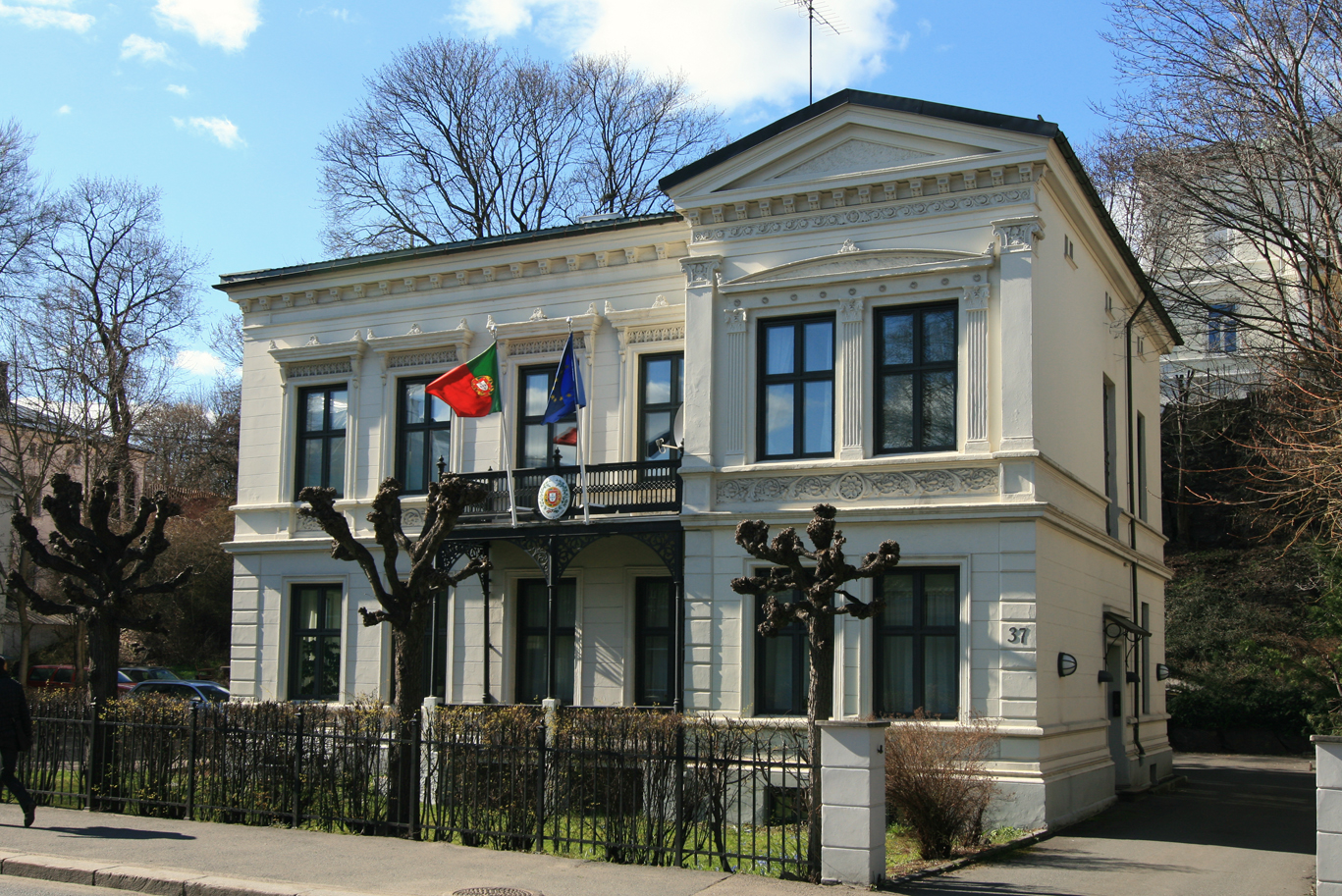
Portuguese embassy in Oslo

In recent years many Portuguese international footballers have moved to Norway to play for Norwegian clubs: in 2023 these included Nelsinho Correira (Elverum), Jorge Vieira (Fram), Rafael Veloso (Gjøvik-Lyn), Bernardo Morgado (IL Hødd), Cláudio Braga (Moss), Samuel Pedro (FK Jerv).

== Remittances ==
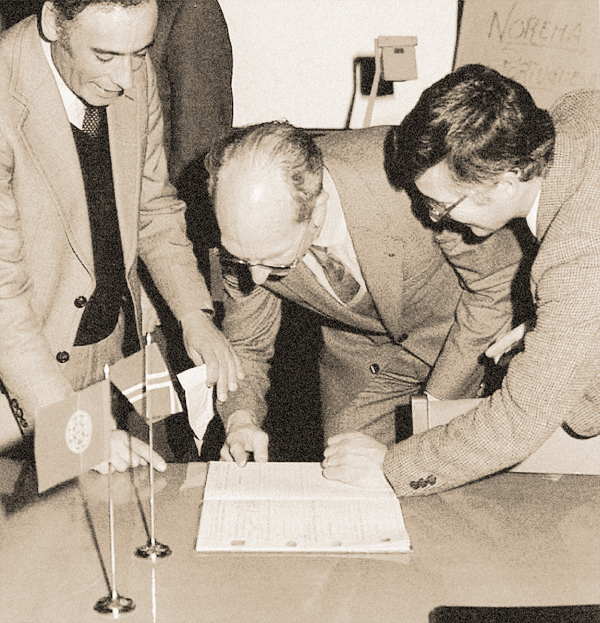
Signing of the Norema Agreements by the Portuguese State Secretary and the Norwegian Ambassador in Lisbon in 1981

The Portuguese community in Norway retains strong ties with its homeland and, between 2000 and 2021, it has sent approximately 78.43 million euros (€) to Portugal in remittances. In the same timeframe, Norwegians in Portugal (numbering around 1,100 individuals) have sent approximately €11.21 million to Norway.

== Portuguese language ==
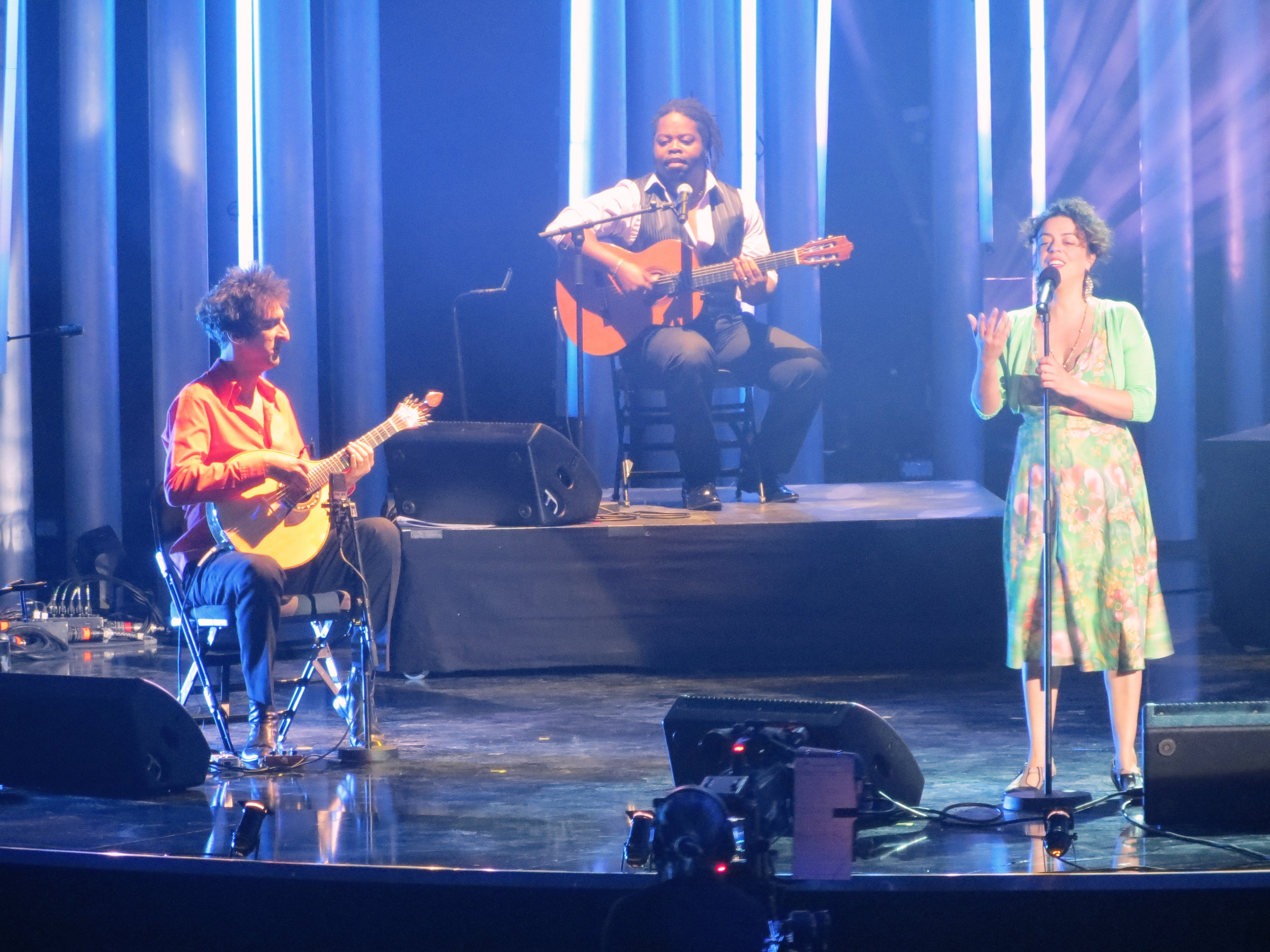
Portuguese group Oquestrada. From the Nobel Peace Prize Concert 2012, in Oslo

As of today, the Portuguese are part of a wider Portuguese-speaking community in Norway, comprising around 1,600 people from PALOP countries (the majority being from Angola and Cape Verde), Timor-Leste or Macau and around 11,060 Brazilians.

People from CPLP countries thus number around 25,300 people, accounting for 0.45% of the population of Norway.

The immigrant community of people coming from CPLP countries in Norway is the second largest found amongst the Nordic countries: in Finland there are a little more than 5,000 CPLP nationals (0.09% of the country's population), in Denmark there are around 11,000 CPLP nationals (0.19% of the country's population) while in Iceland there are around 2,000 CPLP nationals (0.52% of the country's population), and in Sweden 26,700 (0.25% of the population).

== See also ==
- Portuguese in Denmark
- Portuguese in Finland
- Portuguese in Iceland
- Portuguese in Sweden
