= Portugal–Sweden relations =

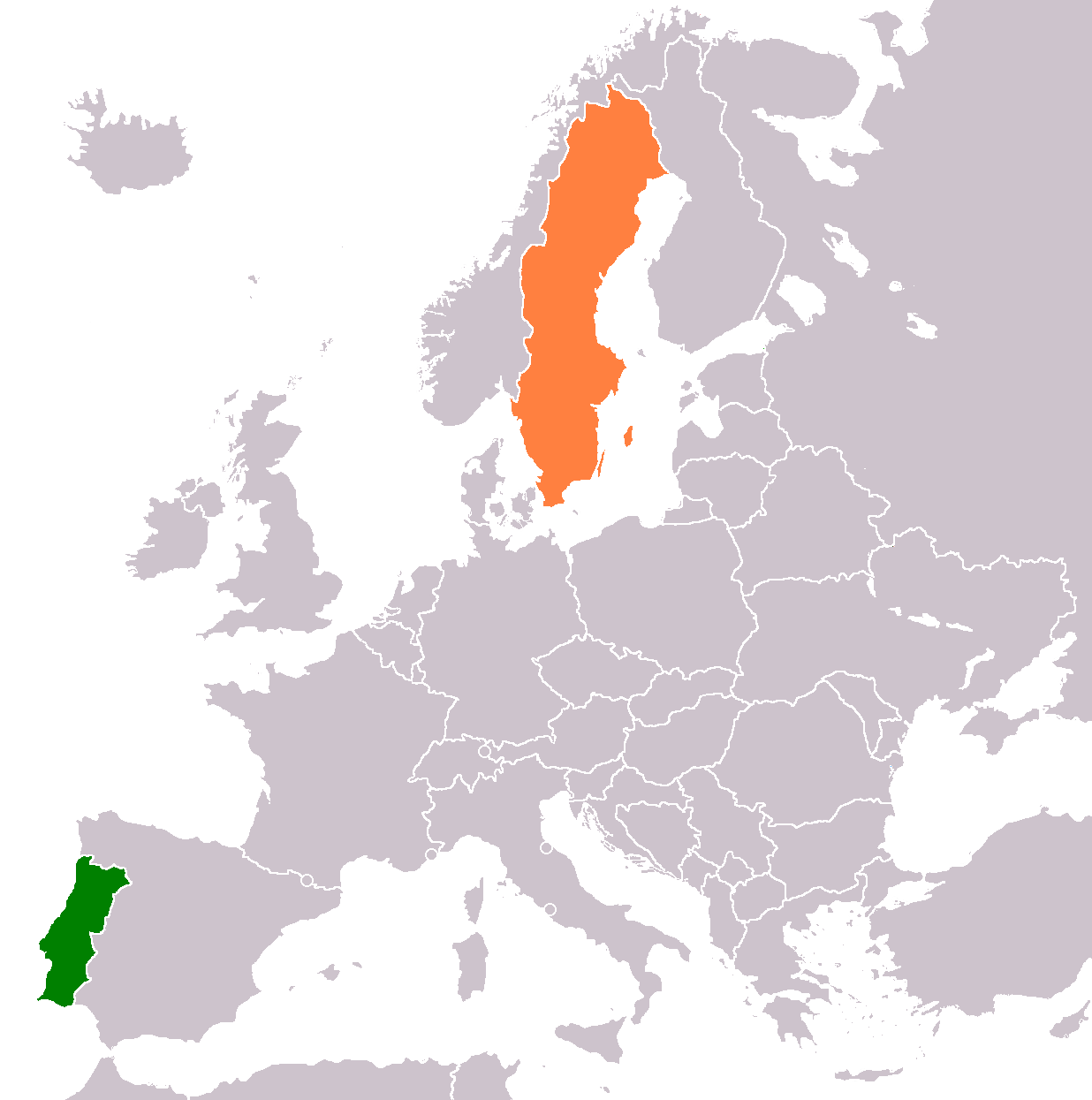
- Portugal: Sweden

Diplomatic mission
- Embassy of Portugal, Stockholm: Embassy of Sweden, Lisbon

Portugal and Sweden maintain foreign relations. Portugal has an embassy in Stockholm. Sweden has an embassy in Lisbon. Both countries are full members of the United Nations, European Union, NATO, Organization for Security and Co-operation in Europe and Council of Europe. Portugal fully supported Sweden's application to join NATO, which resulted in membership on 7 March 2024.

== History ==
=== Early history ===
Diplomatic contact between the two countries dates from 1641 when Francisco de Sousa Coutinho negotiated a treaty providing for free trade and freedom of worship. A Portuguese legation was established in Stockholm that year and diplomatic relations have not been interrupted since.

=== Second World War ===
Both states remained neutral during WWII, Portugal was tied to Britain by the Anglo-Portuguese Alliance, while Sweden's position was shaped by proximity to Germany, but each sough to keep trade open with each other. Commerce run between them largely by clearing agreements that were partly supervised by Germany and was constrained by restriction of shipping. Portuguese official regarded the clearing agreement unfavorable but unavoidable. In 1945 the two government concluded an air navigation agreement allowing the Swedish airline AB Aerotransport to use Lisbon as a stopping point on its routes to South America.

=== Portuguese Colonial War ===
Portugal and Sweden were founding members of the European Free Trade Association in 1960. The outbreak of the Portuguese Colonial War in 1961 took a tole on political relations even though commercial relations continued as usual. Sweden opposed Portuguese rule in Africa and from late 1960s provided assistance to liberation movements in the Portuguese colonies. Reports by the Portuguese secret police (PIDE) record Swedish aid to these movements as a concern of the Estado Novo government. One report from 1969 describes dockworkers in Lisbon refusing to unload a German ship carrying Swedish cargo in protest at Sweden's policy.

=== After the Carnation Revolution ===
The Swedish Social Democratic Party was one of several European social democratic parties in contact with the Portuguese Socialist Party before and during the Carnation Revolution of 1974.

=== European integration ===
Portugal's foreign policy after 1974 was directed mainly at European integration and it joined the European Economic Community in 1986. Sweden, whose policy had been one of neutrality and non-alignment, applied for membership after the end of the Cold War and joined the European Union in 1995 together with Finland and Austria.

In May 2022, the Portuguese government announced that they would fully support Sweden's NATO membership. In October 2022, Portugal fully ratified Sweden's NATO membership application.

== Economic relations ==
Portugal and Sweden are both members of the European Union single market. Trade between them is modest in standards of both countries, but it has gown considerably in recent years. According to a 2025 survey by the Swedish embassy in Lisbon Business Sweden and the Swedish-Portuguese Chamber of Commerce, Swedish imports from Portugal rose by 260% between 2014 to 2025, making Portugal one of Sweden's 30th larges trading partners. The Swedish ambassador to Portugal had said that Portuguese goods exports to Sweden grew by 130% over the five tears up to 2024.

=== Swedish investment in Portugal ===
A study by the Swedish-Portuguese Chamber of Commerce, the Swedish embassy and Business Sweden counted 260 companies in Portugal with Swedish capital or identity. It estimated that they contribute €4.2 billion in gross value added to the Portuguese economy over five years, invested more than €1.1 billion and employed 18,133 people in 2024. The largest employers were Securitas (4,470 staff), IKEA (3,200), IKEA Industry (1,752), Diaverum (1,618) and Boliden's Somincor subsidiary (1,324). Boliden Somincor made the largest single investment, at €430 million between 2020 and 2024. Swedish defence companies have also sought partnership in Portugal. Saab has signed memoranda of understanding with the Portuguese aerospace cluster AED Cluster Portugal, OGMA and Critical Software and its Gripen was among the aircraft considered to replace the Portuguese Air Force's F-16 fleet as of December 2025.

=== Taxation ===
Sweden and Portugal signed a double taxation convention at Helsingborg on 29 August 2002. Sweden terminated it unilaterally with effect from 1 January 2022. The Swedish government objected to the Portuguese Non-Habitual Resident (NHR) tax regime, under which Swedish pensions paid to retirees living in Portugal were taxed little or not at all in either country. Sweden had asked Portugal to ratify a revised convention, but Portugal did not do so. After the determination, pensions paid from Sweden to residents of Portugal became taxable in Sweden at 25%Whether they were taxed in Portugal or not.

== Resident diplomatic missions ==
- Portugal has an embassy in Stockholm.
- Sweden has an embassy in Lisbon.
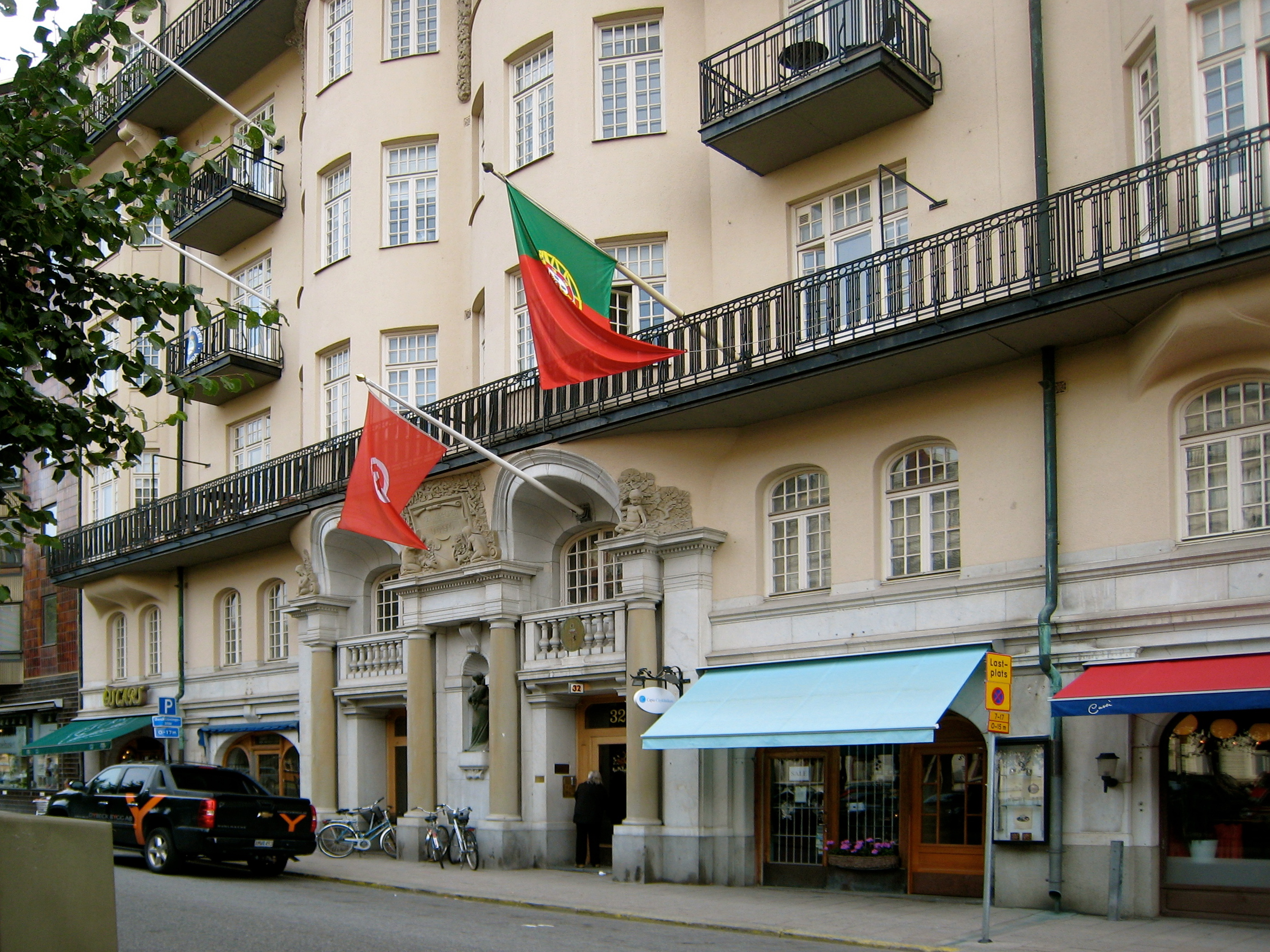
Embassy of Portugal in Stockholm

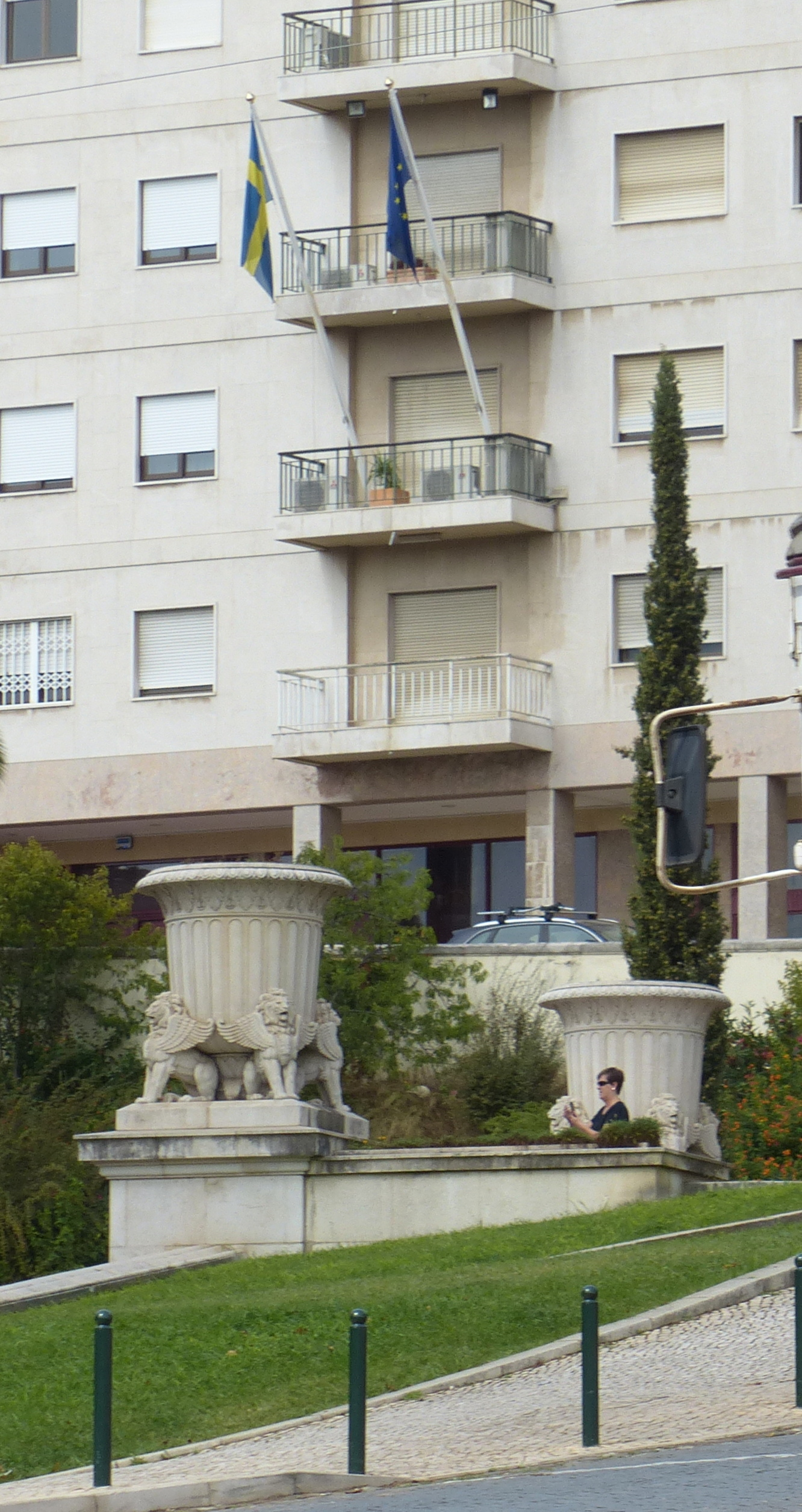
Embassy of Sweden in Lisbon

== See also ==
- Foreign relations of Portugal
- Foreign relations of Sweden
- Portuguese in Sweden
