= Finland–Portugal relations =

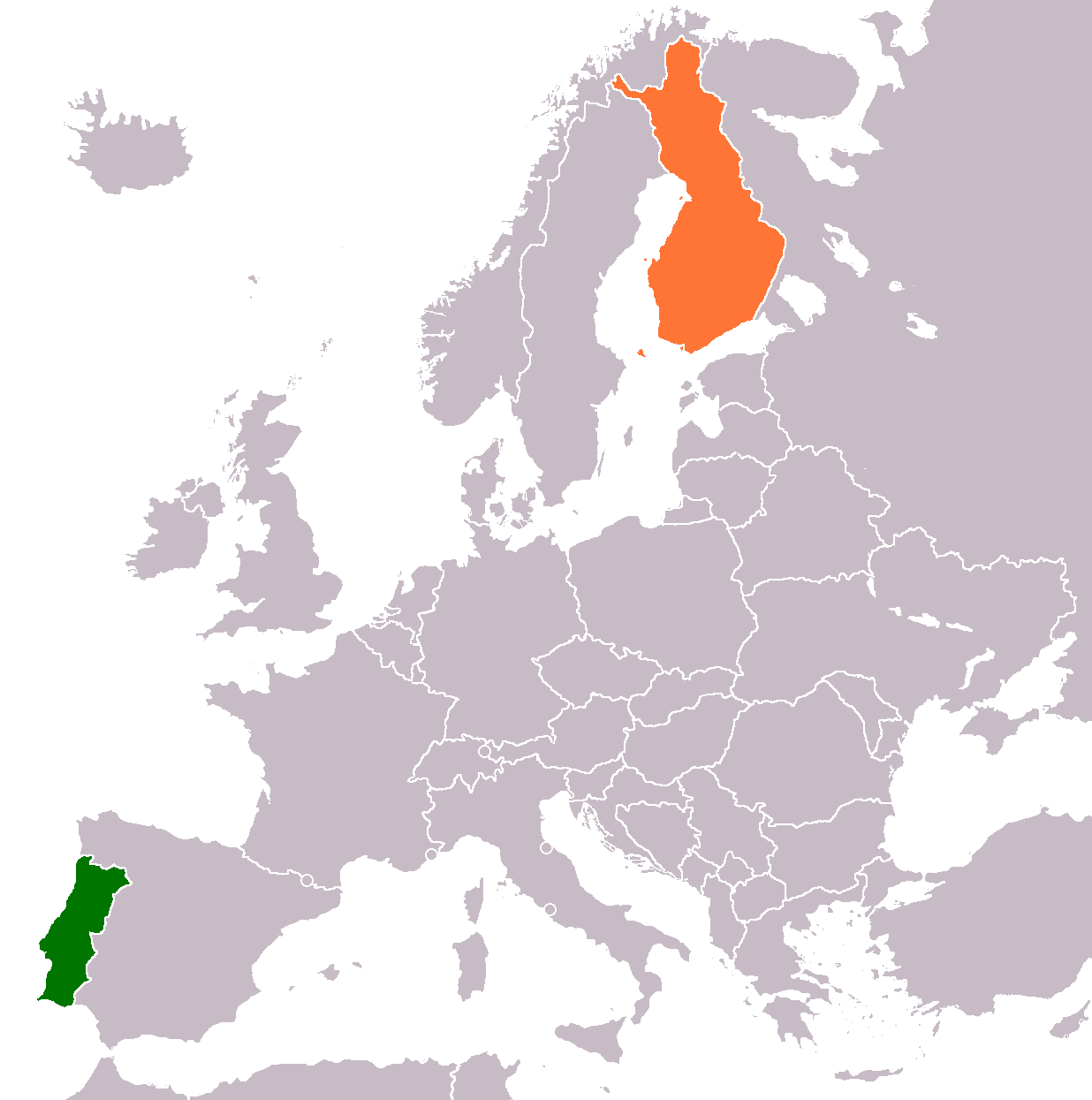
- Finland: Portugal

Diplomatic mission
- Embassy of Portugal, Helsinki: Embassy of Finland, Lisbon

Finland–Portugal relations are foreign relations between Finland and Portugal. Finland has an embassy in Lisbon. Portugal has an embassy in Helsinki. Both countries are full members of the United Nations, European Union, NATO, Organization for Security and Co-operation in Europe and Council of Europe. Portugal fully supported Finland's application to join NATO, which resulted in membership on 4 April 2023.

== History ==
In May 2022, the Portuguese government announced that they would fully support Finland's NATO membership. In October 2022, Portugal fully ratified Finland's NATO membership application.

== High level visits ==
=== High-level visits from Finland to Portugal ===
In September 2014, President Sauli Niinistö travelled to Braga met with President Aníbal Cavaco Silva

== See also ==
- Foreign relations of Finland
- Foreign relations of Portugal
