= Demographics of Iceland =

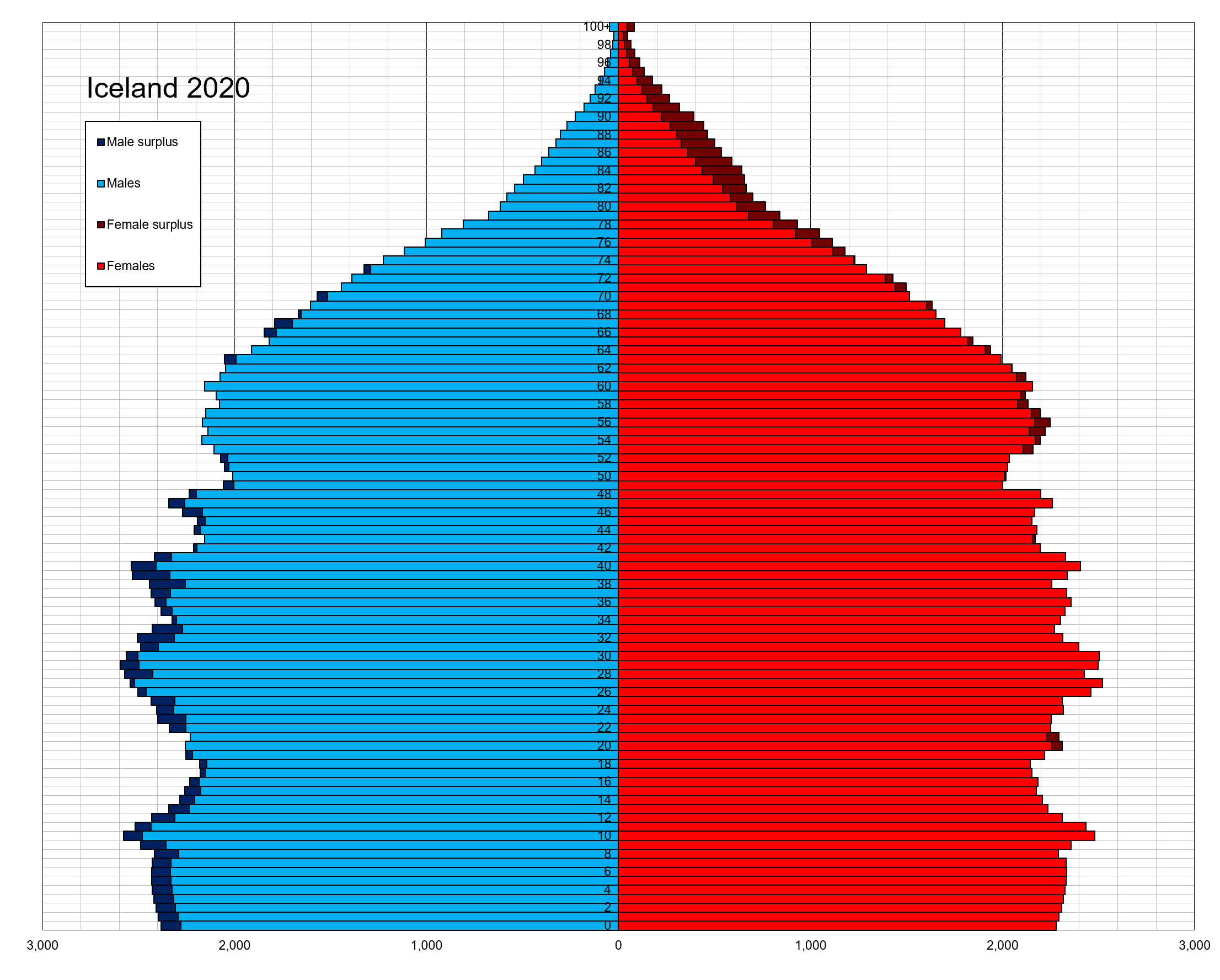
- Population pyramid of Iceland in 2020
- Population: 394,324 (2026)
- Growth rate: 0.93% (2022 est.)
- Birth rate: 12.96 births/1,000 population
- Death rate: 6.56 deaths/1,000 population
- Life expectancy: 83.64 years
  - male: 81.41 years
  - female: 85.97 years
- Fertility rate: 1.95 children
- Infant mortality: 1.65 deaths/1,000 live births
- Net migration rate: 2.89 migrant(s)/1,000 population
- Immigrant share: 25.1% (2024)

Sex ratio
- Total: 1 male(s)/female (2022 est.)
- At birth: 1.05 male(s)/female

Nationality
- Nationality: Icelandic

The demographics of Iceland include population density, education level, health of the populace, economic status, religious affiliations and other aspects of the population.

As of 2026, the Icelandic population is 394,324. In 2026, 77,226 residents (19.6%) were immigrants.

About 99% of the nation's inhabitants live in localities with populations greater than 200, and 64% live in the Capital Region.

== History ==
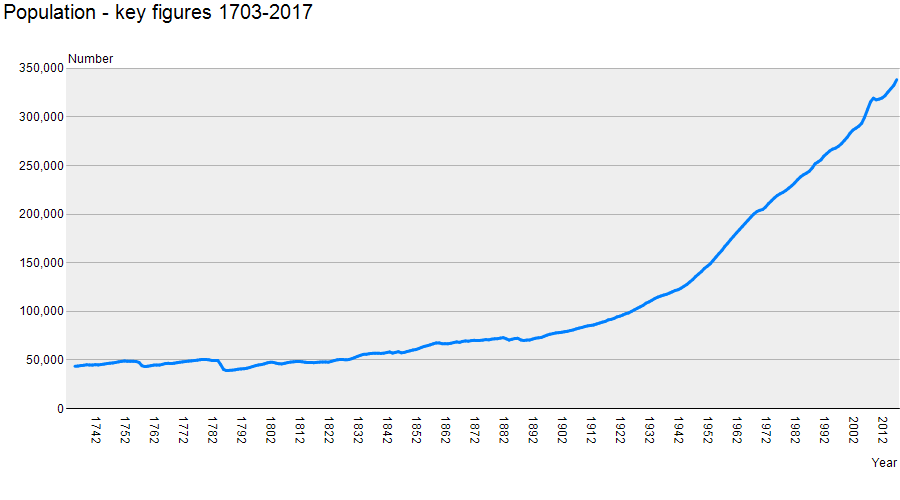
The population of Iceland from 1703 to 2017, using data from Statistics Iceland.

The population of Iceland probably wavered between about 30,000 and 80,000 for most of the time since settlement. Official statistics begin in 1703, since when the population has grown from 50,358 to 394,234 (1 January 2026).

=== Migration ===
==== Settlement ====
Most Icelandic people are descendants of Norwegian settlers, and of Gaels from Ireland and Scotland who were brought over as slaves during the settlement of Iceland in the ninth century AD. Recent DNA analysis suggests that about 66 percent of the male settler-era population was of Norse ancestry and that the female population was 60 percent Celtic. Iceland remained extremely homogenous from its settlement era until the twentieth century.

==== Emigration ====
Large numbers of Icelanders began to emigrate from Iceland in the 1850s. It has been estimated that 17,000 Icelanders migrated to North America in the period 1870–1914, and that 2,000 of them moved back to Iceland; this net loss, 15,000, was about 20% of the Icelandic population in 1887. According to historian Gunnar Karlsson, "migration from Iceland is unique in that most went to Canada, whereas from most or all other European countries the majority went to the United States. This was partly due to the late beginning of emigration from Iceland after the Canadian authorities had begun to promote emigration in cooperation with the Allan Line, which already had an agent in Iceland in 1873. Contrary to most European countries, this promotion campaign was successful in Iceland, because emigration was only just about to start from there and Icelandic emigrants had no relatives in the United States to help them take the first steps".

In the wake of the 2008 Icelandic financial crisis, many Icelanders went to work abroad.

==== Immigration ====
Before the 1990s, there was little immigration to Iceland, and most of it was from other Scandinavian countries: about 1% of Icelanders in 1900 were of Danish heritage (born either in Denmark or to Danish parents). In the mid-1990s, 95% of Icelanders had parents of Icelandic origin, and 2% of Icelanders were first-generation immigrants (born abroad with both parents and all grandparents foreign-born).

Immigration to Iceland rose rapidly in the late twentieth century, encouraged by Iceland's accession to the European Economic Area in 1994, its entry into the Schengen Agreement in 2001, and the country's economic boom in the early twenty-first century. The largest ethnic minority is Poles, who are about a third of the immigrant population. In 2017, 10.6% of the people were first-generation immigrants.

Iceland is also developing relatively small populations of religious minorities, including Catholics (about 15,000 in 2020, 4.02% of Icelanders), Baháʼís (about 400 in 2010), Jews (about 250 in 2018), Buddhists (about 1,500 in 2021), Muslims (about 1,300 in 2015), and Eastern Orthodox (about 995 in 2024).

Research on the experience of immigrants to Iceland is in its early days. There is some evidence that racism is not as acute in Iceland as in other European countries. But, while it is popularly believed in Iceland that racism does not exist there, there is evidence that in some respects immigrant populations experience prejudice and inequalities. For example, Iceland has a higher dropout rate from upper secondary school among young immigrants than the EEA average.

Iceland does not formally collect data on the ethnicity or racial identification of its citizens, but does collect data of the origin and background group by birth.

Historical population
| Year | Pop. | ±% p.a. |
|---|---|---|
| 1703 | 50,358 | — |
| 1750 | 48,241 | −0.09% |
| 1800 | 46,176 | −0.09% |
| 1850 | 59,586 | +0.51% |
| 1860 | 67,754 | +1.29% |
| 1870 | 69,463 | +0.25% |
| 1880 | 71,981 | +0.36% |
| 1890 | 70,581 | −0.20% |
| 1900 | 77,967 | +1.00% |
| 1910 | 84,528 | +0.81% |
| 1920 | 92,855 | +0.94% |
| 1930 | 106,360 | +1.37% |
| 1940 | 120,264 | +1.24% |
| 1950 | 141,042 | +1.61% |
| 1960 | 173,855 | +2.11% |
| 1970 | 204,042 | +1.61% |
| 1980 | 226,948 | +1.07% |
| 1990 | 253,785 | +1.12% |
| 2000 | 279,049 | +0.95% |
| 2010 | 317,630 | +1.30% |
| 2020 | 354,042 | +1.09% |
| 2024 | 383,726 | +2.03% |
Source: Statistics Iceland

=== Migration data ===
Net Immigration in Iceland (1961–2025)
| Year | Total Immigration | Total Emigration | Total Net Immigration | Icelandic Citizens Immigration | Icelandic Citizens Emigration | Icelandic Net Immigration | Foreign Citizens Immigration | Foreign Citizens Emigration | Foreign Citizens Net Immigration |
|---|---|---|---|---|---|---|---|---|---|
| 1961 | 1,618 | 1,689 | -71 | 1,438 | 1,568 | -130 | 180 | 121 | 59 |
| 1962 | 1,728 | 1,730 | -2 | 1,521 | 1,557 | -36 | 207 | 173 | 34 |
| 1963 | 1,524 | 1,600 | -76 | 1,308 | 1,422 | -114 | 216 | 178 | 38 |
| 1964 | 1,753 | 1,673 | 80 | 1,459 | 1,480 | -21 | 294 | 193 | 101 |
| 1965 | 1,812 | 1,781 | 31 | 1,488 | 1,536 | -48 | 324 | 245 | 79 |
| 1966 | 1,832 | 1,727 | 105 | 1,469 | 1,459 | 10 | 363 | 268 | 95 |
| 1967 | 2,146 | 1,992 | 154 | 1,633 | 1,582 | 51 | 513 | 410 | 103 |
| 1968 | 2,358 | 2,216 | 142 | 1,647 | 1,696 | -49 | 711 | 520 | 191 |
| 1969 | 2,198 | 2,077 | 121 | 1,401 | 1,476 | -75 | 797 | 601 | 196 |
| 1970 | 2,326 | 2,169 | 157 | 1,350 | 1,418 | -68 | 976 | 751 | 225 |
| 1971 | 2,136 | 2,010 | 126 | 1,184 | 1,303 | -119 | 952 | 707 | 245 |
| 1972 | 2,213 | 1,907 | 306 | 1,087 | 1,150 | -63 | 1,126 | 757 | 369 |
| 1973 | 2,705 | 2,087 | 618 | 1,163 | 1,141 | 22 | 1,542 | 946 | 596 |
| 1974 | 2,802 | 2,007 | 795 | 1,144 | 1,031 | 113 | 1,658 | 976 | 682 |
| 1975 | 2,630 | 1,890 | 740 | 1,114 | 979 | 135 | 1,516 | 911 | 605 |
| 1976 | 2,736 | 2,028 | 708 | 1,171 | 1,076 | 95 | 1,565 | 952 | 613 |
| 1977 | 2,688 | 1,971 | 717 | 1,041 | 963 | 78 | 1,647 | 1,008 | 639 |
| 1978 | 2,592 | 2,080 | 512 | 1,022 | 1,013 | 9 | 1,570 | 1,067 | 503 |
| 1979 | 2,402 | 2,146 | 256 | 1,005 | 1,012 | -7 | 1,397 | 1,134 | 263 |
| 1980 | 2,437 | 2,368 | 69 | 1,030 | 1,113 | -83 | 1,407 | 1,255 | 152 |
| 1981 | 2,195 | 2,262 | -67 | 926 | 1,001 | -75 | 1,269 | 1,261 | 8 |
| 1982 | 2,203 | 2,144 | 59 | 976 | 969 | 7 | 1,227 | 1,175 | 52 |
| 1983 | 2,073 | 2,066 | 7 | 954 | 974 | -20 | 1,119 | 1,092 | 27 |
| 1984 | 2,239 | 2,124 | 115 | 955 | 939 | 16 | 1,284 | 1,185 | 99 |
| 1985 | 2,242 | 2,243 | -1 | 942 | 972 | -30 | 1,300 | 1,271 | 29 |
| 1986 | 2,401 | 2,362 | 39 | 999 | 1,039 | -40 | 1,402 | 1,323 | 79 |
| 1987 | 2,425 | 2,484 | -59 | 980 | 1,050 | -70 | 1,445 | 1,434 | 11 |
| 1988 | 2,736 | 2,753 | -17 | 1,105 | 1,131 | -26 | 1,631 | 1,622 | 9 |
| 1989 | 3,066 | 2,777 | 289 | 1,278 | 1,182 | 96 | 1,788 | 1,595 | 193 |
| 1990 | 3,498 | 2,908 | 590 | 1,415 | 1,229 | 186 | 2,083 | 1,679 | 404 |
| 1991 | 3,052 | 2,566 | 486 | 1,305 | 1,087 | 218 | 1,747 | 1,479 | 268 |
| 1992 | 2,769 | 2,452 | 317 | 1,124 | 1,011 | 113 | 1,645 | 1,441 | 204 |
| 1993 | 3,001 | 2,644 | 357 | 1,279 | 1,137 | 142 | 1,722 | 1,507 | 215 |
| 1994 | 3,029 | 2,651 | 378 | 1,225 | 1,126 | 99 | 1,804 | 1,525 | 279 |
| 1995 | 3,154 | 2,623 | 531 | 1,169 | 1,040 | 129 | 1,985 | 1,583 | 402 |
| 1996 | 3,865 | 3,062 | 803 | 1,429 | 1,137 | 292 | 2,436 | 1,925 | 511 |
| 1997 | 4,597 | 3,404 | 1,193 | 1,770 | 1,374 | 396 | 2,827 | 2,030 | 797 |
| 1998 | 4,412 | 3,498 | 914 | 1,566 | 1,351 | 215 | 2,846 | 2,147 | 699 |
| 1999 | 4,266 | 3,445 | 821 | 1,476 | 1,245 | 231 | 2,790 | 2,200 | 590 |
| 2000 | 4,089 | 3,433 | 656 | 1,574 | 1,329 | 245 | 2,515 | 2,104 | 411 |
| 2001 | 5,002 | 4,034 | 968 | 2,487 | 2,959 | -472 | 2,515 | 1,075 | 1,440 |
| 2002 | 4,215 | 4,490 | -275 | 2,360 | 3,380 | -1,020 | 1,855 | 1,110 | 745 |
| 2003 | 3,704 | 3,837 | -133 | 2,351 | 2,964 | -613 | 1,353 | 873 | 480 |
| 2004 | 5,348 | 4,820 | 528 | 2,838 | 3,276 | -438 | 2,510 | 1,544 | 966 |
| 2005 | 7,773 | 3,913 | 3,860 | 3,093 | 2,975 | 118 | 4,680 | 938 | 3,742 |
| 2006 | 9,832 | 4,577 | 5,255 | 2,762 | 3,042 | -280 | 7,070 | 1,535 | 5,535 |
| 2007 | 12,546 | 7,414 | 5,132 | 3,228 | 3,395 | -167 | 9,318 | 4,019 | 5,299 |
| 2008 | 10,288 | 9,144 | 1,144 | 2,817 | 3,294 | -477 | 7,471 | 5,850 | 1,621 |
| 2009 | 5,777 | 10,612 | -4,835 | 2,385 | 4,851 | -2,466 | 3,392 | 5,761 | -2,369 |
| 2010 | 5,625 | 7,759 | -2,134 | 2,637 | 4,340 | -1,703 | 2,988 | 3,419 | -431 |
| 2011 | 9,457 | 10,571 | -1,114 | 6,163 | 7,521 | -1,358 | 3,294 | 3,050 | 244 |
| 2012 | 9,869 | 9,781 | 88 | 6,536 | 7,380 | -844 | 3,333 | 2,401 | 932 |
| 2013 | 11,166 | 9,402 | 1,764 | 6,778 | 6,746 | 32 | 4,388 | 2,656 | 1,732 |
| 2014 | 10,939 | 9,892 | 1,047 | 6,113 | 6,912 | -799 | 4,826 | 2,980 | 1,846 |
| 2015 | 11,629 | 10,526 | 1,103 | 6,077 | 7,194 | -1,117 | 5,552 | 3,332 | 2,220 |
| 2016 | 15,368 | 10,574 | 4,794 | 6,765 | 6,543 | 222 | 8,603 | 4,031 | 4,572 |
| 2017 | 19,045 | 11,140 | 7,905 | 6,556 | 5,977 | 579 | 12,489 | 5,163 | 7,326 |
| 2018 | 18,538 | 13,207 | 5,331 | 6,062 | 6,127 | -65 | 12,476 | 7,080 | 5,396 |
| 2019 | 16,529 | 14,065 | 2,464 | 5,800 | 6,146 | -346 | 10,729 | 7,919 | 2,810 |
| 2020 | 15,249 | 13,170 | 2,079 | 6,301 | 5,389 | 912 | 8,948 | 7,781 | 1,167 |
| 2021 | 15,416 | 11,288 | 4,128 | 5,426 | 4,679 | 747 | 9,990 | 6,609 | 3,381 |
| 2022 | 22,209 | 13,549 | 8,660 | 5,220 | 5,746 | -526 | 16,989 | 7,803 | 9,186 |
| 2023 | 21,560 | 14,771 | 6,789 | 4,939 | 5,154 | -215 | 16,621 | 9,617 | 7,004 |
| 2024 | 19,789 | 15,745 | 4,044 | 4,993 | 5,132 | -139 | 14,796 | 10,613 | 4,183 |
| 2025 | 18,674 | 15,508 | 3,166 | 4,601 | 4,947 | -346 | 14,073 | 10,561 | 3,512 |

| Background Groups | Year | | | | | | | | | | | | | |
| Background Groups | 1996 | | 2001 | | 2006 | | 2011 | | 2016 | | 2021 | | 2026 | |
| Background Groups | Number | % | Number | % | Number | % | Number | % | Number | % | Number | % | Number | % |
| Icelanders | 260,054 | 97.10% | 270,106 | 95.32% | 278,975 | 93.02% | 282,779 | 90.65% | 288,412 | 88.46% | 296,983 | 82.89% | 303,264 | 76.91% |
|---|---|---|---|---|---|---|---|---|---|---|---|---|---|---|
| Icelanders of two Icelandic parents | 251,057 | 93.74% | 259,109 | 91.44% | 265,711 | 88.60% | 267,297 | 85.72% | 270,644 | 83.01% | 276,316 | 77.12% | 279,639 | 70.92% |
| Born abroad, Icelandic background | 3,490 | 1.30% | 4,214 | 1.48% | 4,880 | 1.62% | 5,257 | 1.69% | 5,776 | 1.77% | 6,468 | 1.81% | 6,820 | 1.73% |
| Born in Iceland, one parent born abroad | 5,507 | 2.05% | 6,783 | 2.39% | 8,384 | 2.79% | 10,125 | 3.25% | 11,992 | 3.68% | 14,199 | 3.96% | 16,805 | 4.26% |
| Foreign | 7,755 | 2.90% | 13,255 | 4.67% | 20,916 | 6.97% | 29,162 | 9.35% | 37,624 | 11.54% | 61,315 | 17.11% | 91,060 | 23.09% |
| Immigrants | 5,357 | 2.00% | 10,073 | 3.55% | 16,690 | 5.56% | 23,248 | 7.46% | 29,546 | 9.06% | 50,387 | 14.06% | 77,226 | 19.58% |
| Descendants of Immigrants | 345 | 0.12% | 543 | 0.19% | 1,116 | 0.37% | 2,545 | 0.82% | 4,073 | 1.25% | 6,003 | 1.68% | 8,351 | 2.12% |
| Born abroad, one Icelandic parent | 2,053 | 0.76% | 2,639 | 0.93% | 3,110 | 1.03% | 3,369 | 1.08% | 4,005 | 1.23% | 4,925 | 1.37% | 5,483 | 1.39% |
| Total | 267,809 | 100% | 283,361 | 100% | 299,891 | 100% | 311,841 | 100% | 326,036 | 100% | 358,298 | 100% | 394,324 | 100% |

Foreign-born communities of over 300
| Country | 2010 | 2015 | 2020 | 2021 | 2024 | 2026 |
|---|---|---|---|---|---|---|
| Poland | 10,088 | 10,967 | 20,515 | 20,558 | 22,431 | 23,090 |
| Ukraine | 210 | 274 | 430 | 457 | 3,704 | 4,758 |
| Lithuania | 1,442 | 1,499 | 3,299 | 3,292 | 3,579 | 3,820 |
| Denmark | 3,236 | 3,283 | 3,644 | 3,701 | 3,792 | 3,813 |
| Romania | 205 | 400 | 1,995 | 2,117 | 2,992 | 3,388 |
| Philippines | 1,407 | 1,565 | 2,223 | 2,276 | 2,631 | 3,064 |
| United States | 1,849 | 2,019 | 2,516 | 2,680 | 2,752 | 2,903 |
| Sweden | 1,846 | 1,920 | 2,173 | 2,245 | 2,419 | 2,525 |
| Latvia | 641 | 735 | 1,965 | 2,087 | 2,229 | 2,483 |
| Germany | 1,697 | 1,649 | 2,065 | 2,180 | 2,065 | 2,095 |
| Venezuela | 36 | 39 | 229 | 391 | 1,371 | 1,973 |
| Vietnam | 479 | 613 | 885 | 988 | 1,602 | 1,876 |
| United Kingdom | 1,095 | 1,307 | 1,836 | 1,960 | 1,733 | 1,808 |
| Thailand | 1,062 | 1,196 | 1,428 | 1,465 | 1,512 | 1,565 |
| Spain | 288 | 540 | 1,076 | 1,161 | 1,345 | 1,548 |
| Portugal | 607 | 576 | 1,131 | 1,034 | 1,300 | 1,438 |
| Norway | 987 | 1,036 | 1,273 | 1,305 | 1,381 | 1,429 |
| Czech Republic | 152 | 246 | 851 | 792 | 943 | 1,204 |
| Syria | 19 | 35 | 331 | 402 | 771 | 923 |
| France | 444 | 538 | 913 | 966 | 878 | 888 |
| Italy | 218 | 260 | 556 | 607 | 770 | 866 |
| Croatia | 148 | 169 | 828 | 825 | 864 | 846 |
| Greece | 25 | 45 | 228 | 260 | 567 | 836 |
| Palestine | 0 | 6 | 42 | 74 | 492 | 826 |
| India | 272 | 305 | 387 | 439 | 746 | 788 |
| Hungary | 154 | 218 | 506 | 550 | 732 | 777 |
| China | 481 | 582 | 709 | 729 | 740 | 761 |
| Moldova | 13 | 21 | 173 | 227 | 522 | 707 |
| Russia | 294 | 364 | 502 | 515 | 634 | 649 |
| Serbia | 312 | 307 | 516 | 528 | 606 | 629 |
| Slovakia | 234 | 243 | 511 | 463 | 556 | 625 |
| Nigeria | 58 | 65 | 164 | 193 | 311 | 501 |
| Bulgaria | 135 | 240 | 550 | 551 | 491 | 490 |
| Iraq | 48 | 57 | 279 | 400 | 467 | 486 |
| Netherlands | 297 | 288 | 401 | 431 | 432 | 458 |
| Afghanistan | 6 | 11 | 141 | 178 | 367 | 453 |
| Ghana | 44 | 56 | 152 | 173 | 307 | 408 |
| Brazil | 104 | 128 | 211 | 241 | 352 | 405 |
| Iran | 35 | 58 | 184 | 223 | 332 | 402 |
| Colombia | 154 | 179 | 247 | 262 | 333 | 375 |
| Canada | 231 | 277 | 328 | 331 | 351 | 366 |
| Pakistan | 26 | 32 | 91 | 104 | 182 | 353 |
| Morocco | 152 | 161 | 246 | 267 | 314 | 331 |
| Bosnia and Herzegovina | 144 | 150 | 277 | 272 | 277 | 268 |
| Other | 7,066 | 7,489 | 8,561 | 9,014 | 11,610 | 9,332 |
| Total immigrant population | 35,121 | 39,221 | 66,767 | 68,938 | 81,795 | 89,259 |

== Patronymy ==
Most Icelandic names are based on patronymy, and consist of the given name(s) followed by the father's first given name (in the genitive case), followed by "son" or "daughter". For example, Magnús and Anna, children of a man named Pétur Jónsson, would have the full names Magnús Pétursson and Anna Pétursdóttir, respectively. Magnús's daughter Sigríður Ásta would be Sigríður Ásta Magnúsdóttir, and would remain so for the rest of her life regardless of marriage. An Icelandic patronymic is essentially only a designation of fatherhood, and is therefore redundant in Icelandic social life except to differentiate people of the same first name – the phone directory, for example, lists people by their given name first, patronymic second. Thus it has little in common with surnames in other countries except for its position after the given name. It is legally possible in Iceland to use a matronymic instead of a patronymic, using the mother's name instead of the father's. Use of the patronymic system is required by law, except for descendants of those who acquired family names before 1913 (about 10% of the population). One notable Icelander with an inherited family name is football star Eiður Smári Guðjohnsen.

== Urbanisation ==
According to University of Iceland economists Davíd F. Björnsson and Gylfi Zoega, "The policies of the colonial masters in Copenhagen delayed urbanisation. The Danish king maintained a monopoly in trade with Iceland from 1602 until 1855, which made the price of fish artificially low – the price of fish was higher in Britain – and artificially raised the price of agricultural products. Instead, Denmark bought the fish caught from Iceland at below world market prices. Although the trade monopoly ended in 1787, Icelanders could not trade freely with other countries until 1855. Following trade liberalisation, there was a substantial increase in fish exports to Britain, which led to an increase in the number of sailing ships used in fishing, introduced for the first time in 1780. The growth of the fishing industry then created demand for capital, and in 1885 Parliament created the first state bank (Landsbanki). In 1905 came the first motorised fishing vessel, which marked an important step in the development of a specialised fishing industry in Iceland. Iceland exported fresh fish to Britain and salted cod to southern Europe, with Portugal an important export market. Fishing replaced agriculture as the country’s main industry. These developments set the stage for the urbanisation that was to follow in the twentieth century."

A 2017 study looking at individuals going to the capital area for higher education found that "Only about one in three University of Iceland students from regions beyond commuting distance return after graduation, while about half remain in the capital area and others mostly emigrate." Iceland's 10 most populous urban areas:

Largest cities or towns in Iceland statice.is
| Rank | Name | Region | Pop. |
|---|---|---|---|
| 1 | Reykjavík | Capital Region | 138,722 |
| 2 | Kópavogur | Capital Region | 36,975 |
| 3 | Hafnarfjörður | Capital Region | 29,799 |
| 4 | Reykjanesbær | Southern Peninsula | 18,920 |
| 5 | Akureyri | Northeastern Region | 18,925 |
| 6 | Garðabær | Capital Region | 16,299 |
| 7 | Mosfellsbær | Capital Region | 11,463 |
| 8 | Árborg | Southern Region | 9,485 |
| 9 | Akranes | Western Region | 7,411 |
| 10 | Fjarðabyggð | Eastern Region | 5,070 |

== Religion ==
In 2016, 71.6% of the population belonged to the state church, the Evangelical Lutheran Church of Iceland, approximately 5% in free churches, 3.7% to the Roman Catholic Church, approximately 1% to the Ásatrúarfélagið (a legally recognized revival of the pre-Christian religion of Iceland), approximately 1% to Zuism, 8% in unrecognized or unspecified religious groups, and 9% do not belong to any religious group.

As of 2026, 1.5% of the population belongs to a pagan worship religious or life stance organization.

== Icelandic National Registry ==
All living Icelanders, as well as all foreign citizens with permanent residence in Iceland, have a personal identification number (kennitala) identifying them in the National Registry. This number is composed of 10 digits, whereof the first six are made up of the individual's birth date in the format DDMMYY. The next two digits are chosen at random when the kennitala is allocated, the 9th digit is a check digit, and the last digit indicates the period of one hundred years in which the individual was born (for instance, '9' for the period 1900–1999). An example would be 120192-3389. While similar, all-inclusive personal registries exist in other countries, the use of the national registry is unusually extensive in Iceland. It is worth noting that the completeness of the National Registry eliminates any need for census to be performed.

== Summary of vital statistics since 1900 ==
Data according to Statistics Iceland, which collects the official statistics for Iceland.

| Year | Average population | Live births | Deaths | Natural change | Crude birth rate (per 1000) | Crude death rate (per 1000) | Natural change (per 1000) | Total fertility rate | Tempo adjusted fertility rate |
|---|---|---|---|---|---|---|---|---|---|
| 1900 | 78,100 | 2,237 | 1,545 | 692 | 28.6 | 19.8 | 8.9 | 3.93 | |
| 1901 | 78,400 | 2,179 | 1,155 | 1,024 | 27.8 | 14.7 | 13.1 | 3.86 | |
| 1902 | 78,900 | 2,220 | 1,262 | 958 | 27.9 | 16.0 | 12.1 | 3.95 | |
| 1903 | 79,400 | 2,244 | 1,324 | 920 | 28.3 | 16.7 | 11.6 | 4.00 | |
| 1904 | 80,000 | 2,293 | 1,242 | 1,051 | 28.7 | 15.5 | 13.2 | 4.09 | |
| 1905 | 80,700 | 2,271 | 1,435 | 836 | 28.1 | 17.8 | 10.4 | 4.02 | |
| 1906 | 81,600 | 2,346 | 1,193 | 1,153 | 28.8 | 14.6 | 14.1 | 4.14 | |
| 1907 | 82,500 | 2,304 | 1,396 | 908 | 27.9 | 16.9 | 11.0 | 4.04 | |
| 1908 | 83,300 | 2,270 | 1,594 | 676 | 27.3 | 19.1 | 8.1 | 4.01 | |
| 1909 | 84,100 | 2,283 | 1,263 | 1,020 | 27.1 | 15.0 | 12.1 | 4.00 | |
| 1910 | 84,900 | 2,171 | 1,304 | 867 | 25.6 | 15.4 | 10.2 | 3.79 | |
| 1911 | 85,400 | 2,205 | 1,152 | 1,053 | 25.8 | 13.5 | 12.3 | 3.80 | |
| 1912 | 85,900 | 2,234 | 1,171 | 1,063 | 26.0 | 13.6 | 12.4 | 3.82 | |
| 1913 | 86,600 | 2,216 | 1,060 | 1,156 | 25.6 | 12.2 | 13.3 | 3.76 | |
| 1914 | 87,600 | 2,338 | 1,428 | 910 | 26.7 | 16.3 | 10.4 | 3.90 | |
| 1915 | 88,600 | 2,446 | 1,376 | 1,070 | 27.6 | 15.5 | 12.1 | 4.00 | |
| 1916 | 89,000 | 2,377 | 1,322 | 1,055 | 26.6 | 14.8 | 11.8 | 3.81 | |
| 1917 | 91,000 | 2,427 | 1,111 | 1,316 | 26.8 | 12.3 | 14.5 | 3.82 | |
| 1918 | 92,000 | 2,441 | 1,518 | 923 | 26.6 | 16.6 | 10.1 | 3.78 | |
| 1919 | 92,000 | 2,342 | 1,169 | 1,173 | 25.4 | 12.7 | 12.7 | 3.62 | |
| 1920 | 94,000 | 2,627 | 1,360 | 1,267 | 28.1 | 14.5 | 13.6 | 3.96 | |
| 1921 | 95,000 | 2,601 | 1,478 | 1,123 | 27.4 | 15.6 | 11.8 | 3.87 | |
| 1922 | 96,000 | 2,546 | 1,280 | 1,266 | 26.6 | 13.4 | 13.2 | 3.72 | |
| 1923 | 97,000 | 2,612 | 1,287 | 1,325 | 26.9 | 13.3 | 13.7 | 3.77 | |
| 1924 | 98,000 | 2,525 | 1,462 | 1,063 | 25.7 | 14.9 | 10.8 | 3.62 | |
| 1925 | 99,000 | 2,554 | 1,229 | 1,325 | 25.7 | 12.4 | 13.3 | 3.59 | |
| 1926 | 101,000 | 2,676 | 1,121 | 1,555 | 26.5 | 11.1 | 15.4 | 3.71 | |
| 1927 | 103,000 | 2,642 | 1,282 | 1,360 | 25.8 | 12.5 | 13.3 | 3.59 | |
| 1928 | 104,000 | 2,542 | 1,124 | 1,418 | 24.4 | 10.8 | 13.6 | 3.40 | |
| 1929 | 106,000 | 2,644 | 1,237 | 1,407 | 25.0 | 11.7 | 13.3 | 3.47 | |
| 1930 | 107,000 | 2,808 | 1,248 | 1,560 | 26.1 | 11.6 | 14.5 | 3.59 | |
| 1931 | 109,000 | 2,804 | 1,277 | 1,527 | 25.7 | 11.7 | 14.0 | 3.53 | |
| 1932 | 111,000 | 2,696 | 1,191 | 1,505 | 24.4 | 10.8 | 13.6 | 3.31 | |
| 1933 | 112,000 | 2,531 | 1,159 | 1,372 | 22.5 | 10.3 | 12.2 | 3.07 | |
| 1934 | 114,000 | 2,597 | 1,181 | 1,416 | 22.8 | 10.4 | 12.4 | 3.10 | |
| 1935 | 115,000 | 2,551 | 1,402 | 1,149 | 22.1 | 12.2 | 10.0 | 2.99 | |
| 1936 | 116,000 | 2,557 | 1,253 | 1,304 | 22.0 | 10.8 | 11.2 | 2.98 | |
| 1937 | 117,000 | 2,397 | 1,317 | 1,080 | 20.4 | 11.2 | 9.2 | 2.78 | |
| 1938 | 118,000 | 2,374 | 1,207 | 1,167 | 20.1 | 10.2 | 9.9 | 2.71 | |
| 1939 | 120,000 | 2,363 | 1,160 | 1,203 | 19.8 | 9.7 | 10.1 | 2.68 | |
| 1940 | 121,000 | 2,480 | 1,200 | 1,280 | 20.5 | 9.9 | 10.6 | 2.75 | |
| 1941 | 122,000 | 2,634 | 1,352 | 1,282 | 21.6 | 11.1 | 10.5 | 2.91 | |
| 1942 | 123,000 | 3,005 | 1,293 | 1,712 | 24.4 | 10.5 | 13.9 | 3.26 | |
| 1943 | 125,000 | 3,173 | 1,268 | 1,905 | 25.4 | 10.1 | 15.2 | 3.36 | |
| 1944 | 127,000 | 3,213 | 1,218 | 1,995 | 25.3 | 9.6 | 15.7 | 3.34 | |
| 1945 | 129,000 | 3,434 | 1,179 | 2,255 | 26.6 | 9.1 | 17.5 | 3.55 | |
| 1946 | 132,000 | 3,434 | 1,121 | 2,313 | 26.1 | 8.5 | 17.6 | 3.47 | |
| 1947 | 134,000 | 3,706 | 1,162 | 2,544 | 27.6 | 8.6 | 18.9 | 3.67 | |
| 1948 | 137,000 | 3,821 | 1,114 | 2,707 | 27.8 | 8.1 | 19.7 | 3.72 | |
| 1949 | 140,000 | 3,884 | 1,106 | 2,778 | 27.8 | 7.9 | 19.9 | 3.73 | |
| 1950 | 143,000 | 4,093 | 1,122 | 2,971 | 28.7 | 7.9 | 20.8 | 3.86 | |
| 1951 | 145,000 | 3,999 | 1,145 | 2,854 | 27.5 | 7.9 | 19.6 | 3.72 | |
| 1952 | 148,000 | 4,075 | 1,082 | 2,993 | 27.5 | 7.3 | 20.2 | 3.79 | |
| 1953 | 151,000 | 4,254 | 1,118 | 3,136 | 28.1 | 7.4 | 20.7 | 3.94 | |
| 1954 | 154,000 | 4,281 | 1,064 | 3,217 | 27.7 | 6.9 | 20.8 | 3.91 | |
| 1955 | 158,000 | 4,505 | 1,099 | 3,406 | 28.5 | 7.0 | 21.5 | 4.07 | |
| 1956 | 161,000 | 4,603 | 1,153 | 3,450 | 28.5 | 7.2 | 21.3 | 4.14 | |
| 1957 | 165,000 | 4,725 | 1,157 | 3,568 | 28.6 | 7.0 | 21.6 | 4.20 | |
| 1958 | 168,000 | 4,641 | 1,165 | 3,476 | 27.5 | 6.9 | 20.6 | 4.09 | |
| 1959 | 172,000 | 4,837 | 1,242 | 3,595 | 28.1 | 7.2 | 20.9 | 4.24 | |
| 1960 | 176,000 | 4,916 | 1,167 | 3,749 | 28.0 | 6.6 | 21.4 | 4.27 | |
| 1961 | 179,000 | 4,563 | 1,248 | 3,315 | 25.5 | 7.0 | 18.5 | 3.88 | |
| 1962 | 182,000 | 4,711 | 1,237 | 3,474 | 25.9 | 6.8 | 19.1 | 3.98 | |
| 1963 | 186,000 | 4,820 | 1,327 | 3,493 | 26.0 | 7.1 | 18.9 | 3.98 | |
| 1964 | 189,000 | 4,787 | 1,315 | 3,472 | 25.3 | 7.0 | 18.3 | 3.86 | |
| 1965 | 192,000 | 4,721 | 1,291 | 3,430 | 24.6 | 6.7 | 17.9 | 3.71 | |
| 1966 | 196,000 | 4,692 | 1,391 | 3,301 | 24.0 | 7.1 | 16.9 | 3.58 | |
| 1967 | 199,000 | 4,404 | 1,385 | 3,019 | 22.2 | 7.0 | 15.2 | 3.28 | |
| 1968 | 201,000 | 4,227 | 1,390 | 2,837 | 21.0 | 6.9 | 14.1 | 3.07 | |
| 1969 | 203,000 | 4,218 | 1,451 | 2,767 | 20.8 | 7.1 | 13.7 | 2.99 | |
| 1970 | 204,000 | 4,023 | 1,457 | 2,566 | 19.7 | 7.1 | 12.6 | 2.81 | |
| 1971 | 206,000 | 4,277 | 1,501 | 2,776 | 20.8 | 7.3 | 13.5 | 2.92 | |
| 1972 | 209,000 | 4,676 | 1,447 | 3,229 | 22.3 | 6.9 | 15.4 | 3.09 | |
| 1973 | 212,000 | 4,598 | 1,475 | 3,123 | 21.7 | 6.9 | 14.8 | 2.95 | |
| 1974 | 215,000 | 4,276 | 1,495 | 2,781 | 19.9 | 6.9 | 13.0 | 2.66 | |
| 1975 | 218,000 | 4,384 | 1,412 | 2,972 | 20.1 | 6.5 | 13.6 | 2.65 | |
| 1976 | 220,000 | 4,291 | 1,343 | 2,948 | 19.5 | 6.1 | 13.4 | 2.52 | |
| 1977 | 222,000 | 3,996 | 1,435 | 2,561 | 18.0 | 6.5 | 11.5 | 2.31 | |
| 1978 | 224,000 | 4,162 | 1,421 | 2,741 | 18.6 | 6.4 | 12.2 | 2.35 | |
| 1979 | 226,000 | 4,475 | 1,482 | 2,993 | 19.8 | 6.6 | 13.2 | 2.49 | |
| 1980 | 228,000 | 4,528 | 1,538 | 2,990 | 19.8 | 6.7 | 13.1 | 2.48 | |
| 1981 | 231,000 | 4,345 | 1,656 | 2,689 | 18.8 | 7.2 | 11.6 | 2.33 | |
| 1982 | 234,000 | 4,337 | 1,583 | 2,754 | 18.5 | 6.8 | 11.7 | 2.26 | |
| 1983 | 237,000 | 4,371 | 1,653 | 2,718 | 18.4 | 7.0 | 11.4 | 2.24 | |
| 1984 | 240,000 | 4,113 | 1,584 | 2,529 | 17.2 | 6.6 | 10.6 | 2.08 | |
| 1985 | 241,000 | 3,856 | 1,652 | 2,204 | 16.0 | 6.8 | 9.2 | 1.93 | |
| 1986 | 243,000 | 3,881 | 1,598 | 2,283 | 16.0 | 6.6 | 9.4 | 1.93 | |
| 1987 | 246,000 | 4,193 | 1,724 | 2,469 | 17.0 | 7.0 | 10.0 | 2.07 | |
| 1988 | 250,000 | 4,673 | 1,818 | 2,855 | 18.7 | 7.3 | 11.4 | 2.27 | |
| 1989 | 253,000 | 4,560 | 1,716 | 2,844 | 18.0 | 6.8 | 11.2 | 2.20 | |
| 1990 | 255,000 | 4,768 | 1,704 | 3,064 | 18.7 | 6.7 | 12.0 | 2.31 | |
| 1991 | 258,000 | 4,533 | 1,796 | 2,737 | 17.6 | 7.0 | 10.6 | 2.19 | |
| 1992 | 261,000 | 4,609 | 1,719 | 2,890 | 17.7 | 6.6 | 11.1 | 2.21 | |
| 1993 | 264,000 | 4,623 | 1,753 | 2,870 | 17.5 | 6.6 | 10.9 | 2.22 | |
| 1994 | 266,000 | 4,442 | 1,717 | 2,725 | 16.7 | 6.4 | 10.3 | 2.14 | |
| 1995 | 267,000 | 4,280 | 1,923 | 2,357 | 16.0 | 7.2 | 8.8 | 2.08 | |
| 1996 | 269,000 | 4,329 | 1,879 | 2,450 | 16.1 | 7.0 | 9.1 | 2.12 | |
| 1997 | 271,000 | 4,151 | 1,843 | 2,308 | 15.3 | 6.8 | 8.5 | 2.04 | |
| 1998 | 274,000 | 4,178 | 1,821 | 2,357 | 15.3 | 6.7 | 8.6 | 2.05 | |
| 1999 | 277,000 | 4,100 | 1,901 | 2,199 | 14.9 | 6.9 | 8.0 | 1.99 | |
| 2000 | 281,000 | 4,315 | 1,828 | 2,487 | 15.5 | 6.5 | 9.0 | 2.08 | |
| 2001 | 285,000 | 4,091 | 1,725 | 2,366 | 14.4 | 6.1 | 8.3 | 1.95 | |
| 2002 | 288,000 | 4,049 | 1,822 | 2,227 | 14.1 | 6.3 | 7.8 | 1.93 | |
| 2003 | 290,000 | 4,143 | 1,826 | 2,317 | 14.3 | 6.3 | 8.0 | 1.99 | |
| 2004 | 292,000 | 4,234 | 1,824 | 2,410 | 14.5 | 6.2 | 8.3 | 2.03 | |
| 2005 | 297,000 | 4,280 | 1,837 | 2,443 | 14.4 | 6.2 | 8.2 | 2.05 | |
| 2006 | 304,000 | 4,415 | 1,903 | 2,512 | 14.7 | 6.3 | 8.4 | 2.07 | |
| 2007 | 308,000 | 4,560 | 1,943 | 2,617 | 14.9 | 6.3 | 8.6 | 2.09 | |
| 2008 | 315,000 | 4,835 | 1,987 | 2,848 | 15.4 | 6.2 | 9.2 | 2.14 | |
| 2009 | 318,000 | 5,026 | 2,002 | 3,024 | 15.8 | 6.3 | 9.5 | 2.22 | |
| 2010 | 315,000 | 4,907 | 2,020 | 2,887 | 15.6 | 6.4 | 9.2 | 2.20 | 2.38 |
| 2011 | 312,000 | 4,492 | 1,986 | 2,506 | 14.4 | 6.4 | 8.0 | 2.02 | 2.24 |
| 2012 | 314,000 | 4,533 | 1,955 | 2,578 | 14.4 | 6.2 | 8.2 | 2.04 | 2.49 |
| 2013 | 318,000 | 4,326 | 2,154 | 2,172 | 13.6 | 6.8 | 6.8 | 1.93 | 2.21 |
| 2014 | 321,000 | 4,375 | 2,049 | 2,326 | 13.6 | 6.4 | 7.2 | 1.93 | 2.02 |
| 2015 | 324,500 | 4,129 | 2,178 | 1,951 | 12.7 | 6.7 | 6.0 | 1.81 | 2.16 |
| 2016 | 329,300 | 4,034 | 2,309 | 1,725 | 12.2 | 7.0 | 5.2 | 1.75 | 2.21 |
| 2017 | 337,300 | 4,071 | 2,239 | 1,832 | 12.1 | 6.6 | 5.4 | 1.71 | 2.17 |
| 2018 | 345,800 | 4,228 | 2,257 | 1,971 | 12.2 | 6.5 | 5.7 | 1.71 | 2.53 |
| 2019 | 351,800 | 4,452 | 2,277 | 2,175 | 12.7 | 6.5 | 6.2 | 1.74 | 2.11 |
| 2020 | 356,200 | 4,512 | 2,308 | 2,204 | 12.7 | 6.5 | 6.2 | 1.72 | 1.57 |
| 2021 | 361,600 | 4,879 | 2,338 | 2,541 | 13.5 | 6.5 | 7.0 | 1.82 | 1.89 |
| 2022 | 370,100 | 4,382 | 2,693 | 1,698 | 11.8 | 7.3 | 4.6 | 1.67 | 1.91 |
| 2023 | 379,500 | 4,315 | 2,571 | 1,744 | 11.4 | 6.8 | 4.6 | 1.59 | |
| 2024 | 389,500 | 4,311 | 2,620 | 1,691 | 11.1 | 6.8 | 4.3 | 1.56 | |
| 2025 | 394,530 | 4,387 | 2,658 | 1,729 | 11.1 | 6.8 | 4.3 | 1.56 | |

View source data.
View source data.

View source data.

=== Current vital statistics ===
| Period | Live births | Deaths | Natural increase |
|---|---|---|---|
| January—September 2025 | 3,290 | 1,960 | +1,330 |
| January—September 2026 | 3,540 | 1,880 | +1,660 |
| Difference | ▲ +250 (+7.6%) | ▼ –80 (-4.1%) | ▲ +330 |

=== Structure of the population ===
Population Estimates by Sex and Age Group (01.I.2020):

| Age Group | Male | Female | Total | % |
|---|---|---|---|---|
| Total | 186 941 | 177 193 | 364 134 | 100 |
| 0–4 | 11 029 | 10 333 | 21 362 | 5.87 |
| 5–9 | 11 831 | 11 396 | 23 227 | 6.38 |
| 10–14 | 12 186 | 11 444 | 23 630 | 6.49 |
| 15–19 | 11 289 | 10 954 | 22 243 | 6.11 |
| 20–24 | 13 251 | 12 519 | 25 770 | 7.08 |
| 25–29 | 16 328 | 14 239 | 30 567 | 8.39 |
| 30–34 | 14 816 | 12 572 | 27 388 | 7.52 |
| 35–39 | 13 992 | 12 081 | 26 073 | 7.16 |
| 40–44 | 12 557 | 11 454 | 24 011 | 6.59 |
| 45–49 | 12 007 | 10 958 | 22 965 | 6.31 |
| 50–54 | 11 232 | 10 795 | 22 027 | 6.05 |
| 55–59 | 10 985 | 10 980 | 21 965 | 6.03 |
| 60–64 | 10 288 | 10 145 | 20 433 | 5.61 |
| 65-69 | 8 550 | 8 431 | 16 981 | 4.66 |
| 70-74 | 6 821 | 6 796 | 13 617 | 3.74 |
| 75-79 | 4 402 | 4 871 | 9 273 | 2.55 |
| 80-84 | 2 866 | 3 272 | 6 138 | 1.69 |
| 85-89 | 1 724 | 2 430 | 4 154 | 1.14 |
| 90-94 | 667 | 1 199 | 1 866 | 0.51 |
| 95-99 | 109 | 285 | 394 | 0.11 |
| 100+ | 11 | 39 | 50 | 0.01 |
| Age group | Male | Female | Total | Percent |
| 0–14 | 35 046 | 33 173 | 68 219 | 18.73 |
| 15–64 | 126 745 | 116 697 | 243 442 | 66.86 |
| 65+ | 25 150 | 27 323 | 52 473 | 14.41 |

=== Population projection ===
Population projection (1 January)
| Year | Low | Medium | High |
|---|---|---|---|
| 2025 | 388,325 | 391,092 | 394,114 |
| 2026 | 395,362 | 399,559 | 404,183 |
| 2027 | 402,285 | 407,998 | 414,271 |
| 2028 | 409,095 | 416,366 | 424,367 |
| 2029 | 415,807 | 424,692 | 434,490 |
| 2030 | 422,420 | 432,977 | 444,675 |
| 2035 | 452,799 | 472,516 | 494,932 |
| 2040 | 478,091 | 508,125 | 543,572 |
| 2045 | 496,851 | 537,749 | 588,698 |
| 2050 | 509,107 | 561,114 | 629,815 |
| 2055 | 515,920 | 578,855 | 667,611 |
| 2060 | 517,967 | 591,498 | 702,683 |
| 2065 | 516,868 | 600,839 | 736,711 |
| 2070 | 511,417 | 605,250 | 767,775 |
| 2074 | 503,633 | 604,833 | 790,071 |

=== Life expectancy ===
Life expectancy in Iceland since 1838

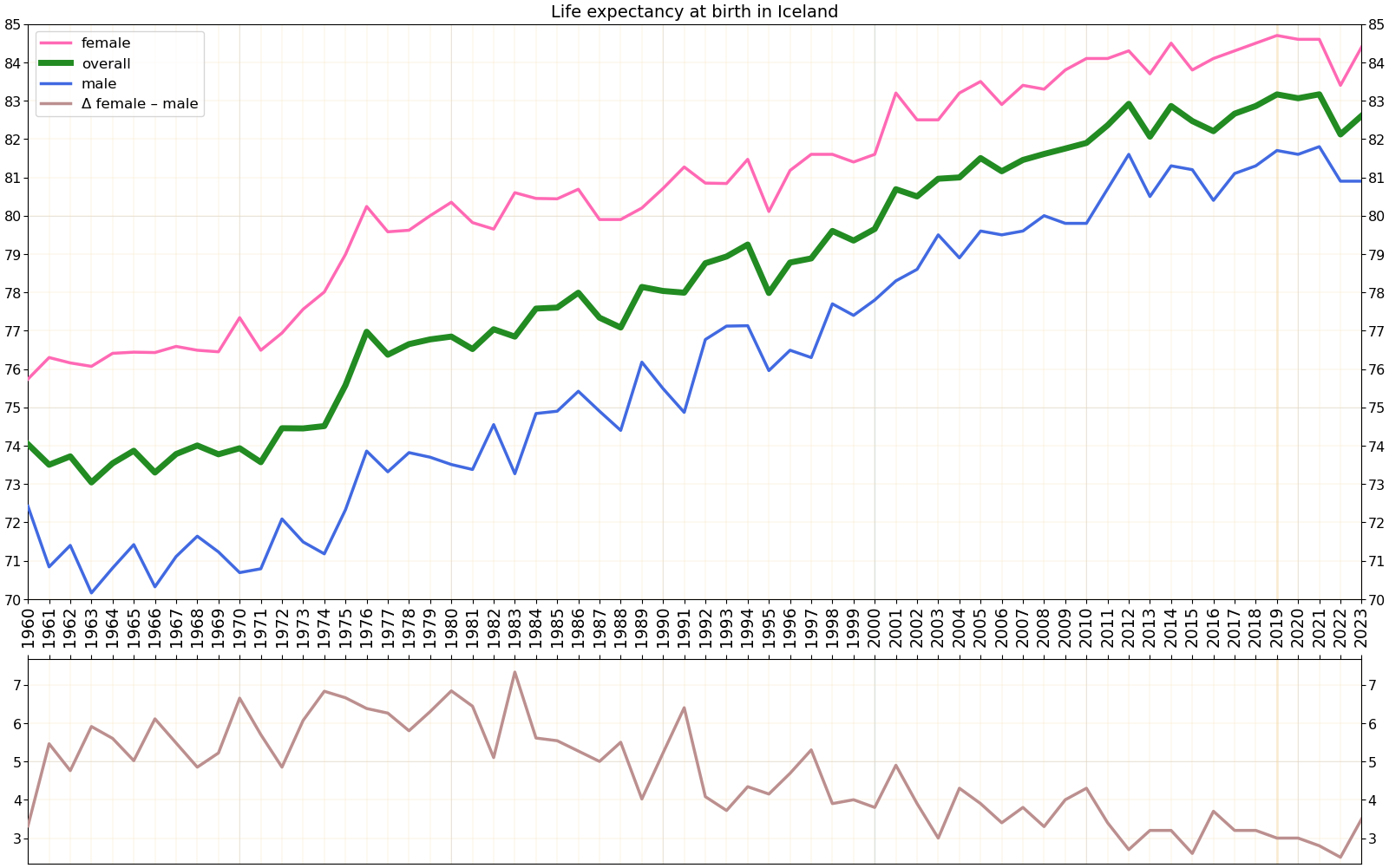
Life expectancy in Iceland since 1960 by sex

| Period | Life expectancy in Years | Period | Life expectancy in Years |
|---|---|---|---|
| 1950–1955 | 72.2 | 1985–1990 | 77.6 |
| 1955–1960 | 73.2 | 1990–1995 | 78.5 |
| 1960–1965 | 73.5 | 1995–2000 | 79.1 |
| 1965–1970 | 73.7 | 2000–2005 | 80.7 |
| 1970–1975 | 74.2 | 2005–2010 | 81.4 |
| 1975–1980 | 76.3 | 2010–2015 | 82.2 |
| 1980–1985 | 76.9 | | |

Source: UN World Population Prospects

== CIA World Factbook demographic statistics ==
The following demographic statistics are from the CIA World Factbook, unless otherwise indicated.

Age structure

0–14 years: 19.8% (male 36,692/female 35,239)
15–64 years: 63.2% (male 116,210/female 113,810)
65 years and over: 17.1% (male 29,366/female 32,719) (2024 est.)

Sex ratio

at birth: 1.05 males: 1 female
under 15 years: 1.04 males: 1 female

15–64 years: 1.02 males: 1 female
65 years and over: 0.9 males: 1 female
total population: 1 male: 1 female (2024 est.)

Maternal mortality rate

3 deaths/100,000 live births (2020 est.)

Infant mortality rate

1.6 deaths/1,000 live births (2024 est.)

Life expectancy at birth

total population: 84 years
male: 81.8 years
female: 86.3 years (2024 est.)

Health expenditures

9.6% of GDP (2020)

Physicians density

4.14 physicians/1,000 population (2019)

Obesity – adult prevalence rate

21.9% (2016)

Education expenditures

7.7% of GDP (2020 est.)

Mother's mean age at first birth

28.7 (2020 est.)

Nationality

noun: Icelander(s)
adjective: Icelandic

Ethnic groups

78.7% Icelandic, 5.8% Polish, 1% Danish, 1% Ukrainian, 13.5% other (2024 est.)

Religions

Evangelical Lutheran Church of Iceland (official) 58.6%, Roman Catholic 3.8%, Independent Congregation of Reykjavik 2.6%, Independent Congregation of Hafnarfjordur 1.9%, Pagan Worship 1.5%, Icelandic Ethical Humanist Association 1.4%, other or unspecified 18.7%, none 7.7% (2024 est.)

Languages

Icelandic (English and a second Nordic language, Danish by default, are also a part of the Icelandic compulsory education).
