= Demographics of Finland =

- Population pyramid of Finland in 2020
- Population: 5,652,881
- Growth rate: 0.3% (2025)
- Birth rate: 8.52 births/1,000 population (2026 est.)
- Death rate: 10.39 deaths/1,000 population (2026 est.)
- Life expectancy: 81.76 years
  - male: 78.86 years
  - female: 84.79 years (2023)
- Fertility rate: 1.25 children born/woman (2024)
- Infant mortality: 2.13 deaths/1,000 live births
- Net migration rate: 8.65 migrant(s)/1,000 population (2024)

Age structure
- 0–14 years: 14.3% (2025)
- 15–64 years: 61.9% (2025)
- 65 and over: 23.8% (2025)

Sex ratio
- Total: 0.97 male(s)/female (2023)
- At birth: 1.05 male(s)/female
- Under 15: 1.05 male(s)/female
- 65 and over: 0.63 male(s)/female

Nationality
- Nationality: noun: Finn(s) adjective: Finnish
- Major ethnic: Finnish (88.3% background)

Language
- Official: Finnish, Swedish
- Spoken: Finnish, Swedish, Sámi

The demographics of Finland is monitored by the Statistics Finland (Finnish: Tilastokeskus, Swedish: Statistikcentralen). Finland has a population of almost 5.7 million people, ranking it 19th out of 27 within the European Union. The average population density in Finland is 19 inhabitants per square kilometre (49/sq mi), making it the third most sparsely populated country in Europe, after Iceland and Norway. Population distribution is extremely uneven, with the majority of the population concentrated in the southern and western regions of the country. The majority of the Finnish population – approximately 73% – lives in urban areas. Approximately 1.62 million, or almost 30%, reside solely in the Helsinki Metropolitan Area. Conversely, the Arctic Lapland region contains only two inhabitants per square kilometre (5.2/sq mi).

Until recently, Finland has been mainly an ethnically homogeneous country, with native Finns being the dominant ethnic group. However, with increased immigration, the country is slowly becoming more ethnically diverse. In addition, Finland is home to significant groups of Finland-Swedish, Sámi and Roma minorities, which have long historical roots in the country. The official languages are Finnish and Swedish, of which 83.5 percent and 5.0 percent of the population respectively speak as their mother tongue. Finland was a part of the Swedish kingdom for around 500 years.

Due to recent immigration, significant populations of ethnic Estonians, Russians, Ukrainians, Iraqis, Chinese, Somalis, Filipinos, Indians and Iranians, now reside in the country.

As of 2025, Statistics Finland has published data on the foreign population using three different methods. The Finnish population includes persons of foreign origin and background, who make up 11.7% of the total population. (Note: Statistics Finland classifies a person as having a "foreign background" if both parents or the only known parent were born abroad.) In additional calculations, the proportion of persons born outside Finland is 11%. Persons with a mother tongue other than Finnish, Swedish or Sámi account for 11.4%.

In the history of Finland, the first human settlement originated approximately 11,000 BC, following the end of the Ice Age. The initial settlers of present-day Finland were presumably hunter-gatherers. They were later replaced by the Sámi, followed by Finnic populations from the east, south and west. The initial dependable population information dates back to 1749 when Swedish officials initially recorded population statistics. Finland was a part of the Swedish Kingdom until it became a Grand Duchy ruled by the Russian Empire in 1809, and finally gained its full independence in 1917.

In the late 19th and 20th centuries, significant emigration, primarily from rural areas, occurred to Sweden and North America, while Finland's primary immigrant source was other European countries. Approximately 300,000 Finnish nationals reside abroad and, according to estimates, the number of individuals of Finnish ancestry worldwide ranges from 1.6 to 2 million. Currently, Sweden, the United Kingdom, Germany, the United States, and Spain are the preferred destinations for most Finnish emigrants.

One of the primary challenges facing society in the future is adapting to demographic changes, particularly the aging of the population. The proportion of the working-age population is decreasing, resulting in projected labour shortages. However, immigration has significantly increased in recent years. If the current trend persists, the population of Finland will continue to increase and could even reach the milestone of 6 million people by 2040.

== Population ==
As of 2025, there are 5,652,881 people in Finland.

View source data.
View source data.
View source data.

=== Historical population ===
The first human settlement in Finland originated around 11,000 BC, following the end of the Ice Age. The initial inhabitants of modern-day Finland were presumably hunter-gatherers. There is no information about the language spoken by the first inhabitants. However, it is known that the Finnish and Sámi languages emerged thousands of years later. Archaeological, linguistic, and genetic studies support the notion that the country was inhabited from south to north, with a population of a few thousand during prehistoric times. The Sámi people then succeeded the previous inhabitants, followed by the influx of Finnic people from the east, west, and south who eventually replaced them. The Sámi people now number around 10,000 in Finland as a minority. Although they have lived north of the Arctic Circle for 7,000 years, they make up only 5% of the population of the province of Lapland.

The reliable population data is available from 1749, when Sweden first compiled population statistics. At that time, the population of Finland stood at 410,400 individuals. The threshold of one million inhabitants was surpassed subsequent to the Finnish War (1808–1809) in 1811, upon the annexation of the Old Finland region. The milestone of five million inhabitants was reached in 1991.

Exceeding the million population milestones:

- 1 million in 1811
- 2 million in 1879
- 3 million in 1912
- 4 million in 1950
- 5 million in 1991

Until the beginning of the 20th century, annual population growth fluctuated between 1% and 2%. There were a few exceptional years of negative growth during times of war and destruction. The significant demographic and economic transformations that took place in Finland post-World War II affected the composition of Finnish families. Over time, family sizes reduced noticeably, declining from an average of 3.6 individuals in 1950 to an average of 2.7 in 1975. Despite this change, family structures remained relatively constant during the 25-year period, with 24.4% of families consisting of a man and a woman, 61.9% comprising a couple and children, 11.8% consisting of a woman with offspring, and 1.9% consisting of a man with offspring. There were no substantial differences in percentages compared to 1950.

Nonetheless, fewer children were born per family; the average decreased from 2.24 in 1950 to 1.7 in the 1980s. Large families were infrequent, with only 2% having four or more children, while 51% had a single child; 38% had two children, and 9% had three children. Population growth declined to below 0.5% in the 1970s, and to approximately 0.2% in the 1990s. In recent years, however, population growth has recovered partially, rising to approximately 0.5%, partly due to increased immigration.

Historical population

Year	Pop.	±% p.a.
1750	421,000	—
1760	490,000	+1.53%
1770	560,000	+1.34%
1780	660,000	+1.66%
1790	706,000	+0.68%
1800	837,000	+1.72%
1810	863,000	+0.31%
1820	1,177,500	+3.16%
1830	1,372,100	+1.54%
1840	1,445,600	+0.52%

Year	Pop.	±% p.a.
1850	1,636,900	+1.25%
1860	1,746,700	+0.65%
1870	1,768,800	+0.13%
1880	2,060,800	+1.54%
1890	2,380,100	+1.45%
1900	2,655,900	+1.10%
1910	2,943,400	+1.03%
1920	3,147,600	+0.67%
1930	3,462,700	+0.96%
1940	3,695,610	+0.65%

Year	Pop.	±% p.a.
1950	4,029,800	+0.87%
1960	4,496,220	+1.10%
1970	4,598,330	+0.22%
1980	4,787,770	+0.40%
1990	4,998,480	+0.43%
2000	5,181,000	+0.36%
2010	5,375,300	+0.37%
2020	5,536,146	+0.30%

Population size prior to 1812 may be affected by changes on administrative divisions.
1990–2020 source: Statistics Finland

=== Distribution and density ===
Population densities in Finland, inhabitants per square kilometre

As of 2025, the population density of Finland was 18.6 persons per square kilometre. The region of Uusimaa was the most densely populated region with around 196 persons per square kilometre, while Lapland was the least densely populated region with only around two persons per square kilometre. The populace is heavily clustered in the west and south of Finland, where the largest urban centres are situated. There are a total of nine cities in Finland with more than 100,000 residents.

Population by region as of 2024
Area	Population	Of total population (%)
Uusimaa	1,782,300	32
Southwest Finland	494,819	9
Satakunta	211,261	4
Kanta-Häme	169,455	3
Pirkanmaa	545,406	10
Päijät-Häme	204,635	4
Kymenlaakso	157,442	3
South Karelia	125,083	2
South Savo	129,376	2
North Savo	248,815	4
North Karelia	162,091	3
Central Finland	274,112	5
South Ostrobothnia	189,929	3
Ostrobothnia	178,749	3
Central Ostrobothnia	67,723	1
North Ostrobothnia	418,331	7
Kainuu	69,639	1
Lapland	176,151	3
Åland	30,654	1

The geographical center of population (Weber point) of the Finnish population is currently located in Hauho, in the village of Sappee, now part of the town of Hämeenlinna. The coordinates of this point are 61' 17" N, 25' 07" E.

Urban-rural classification as of 2022
Area	Population	Of total population (%)
URBAN AREAS	4,044,568	73
Inner urban area	2,104,164	38
Outer urban area	1,341,122	24
Peri-urban area	599,282	11
RURAL AREAS	1,450,534	26
Local centres in rural areas	302,264	5
Rural areas close to urban areas	385,211	7
Rural heartland areas	503,590	9
Sparsely populated rural areas	259,469	5
Unknown	68,868	1

== Fertility ==
Population pyramid segmented by background. Finnish background in color, foreign background in grey.

View source data.

As of 2023, the birth rate dropped to its lowest level on record since 1776 with a total fertility rate of 1.26. A total of 43,320 children were born, and 38,179 (85%) of them were delivered by women who speak Finnish, Swedish or Sámi, the country's national languages. As of 2020, the average age of first-time mothers was 29.7 years old. The mean age of women who have given birth to a live child was 31.3 years.

Total fertility rate and gross reproduction rate by region as of 2022
Area	Total fertility rate	Gross reproduction rate
FINLAND	1.32	0.64
Uusimaa	1.26	0.61
Southwest Finland	1.27	0.62
Satakunta	1.40	0.68
Kanta-Häme	1.42	0.67
Pirkanmaa	1.23	0.61
Päijät-Häme	1.36	0.66
Kymenlaakso	1.23	0.58
South Karelia	1.28	0.61
South Savo	1.29	0.6
North Savo	1.30	0.65
North Karelia	1.19	0.57
Central Finland	1.28	0.64
South Ostrobothnia	1.57	0.78
Ostrobothnia	1.57	0.78
Central Ostrobothnia	1.73	0.83
North Ostrobothnia	1.58	0.78
Kainuu	1.37	0.67
Lapland	1.34	0.66
Åland	1.45	0.85

As of 2021, people with a foreign background in Finland had higher fertility rates than those with Finnish roots. Women of foreign descent, either born abroad (1.7) or in Finland (1.65), had the most substantial total fertility rates, averaging 1.45 for all women in Finland. Women of Finnish lineage had a slightly higher fertility rate of 1.4. For men, the total fertility rate was just above 1.3, with Finnish men slightly under the average. In contrast, men of foreign origin, whether born abroad or in Finland, exhibited a fertility rate of approximately 1.45 each. Since 2018, the most frequent countries of affiliation for women of foreign origin delivering infants have been former Soviet Union countries, Somalia, and Iraq.

=== Historical fertility rates ===
In the 18th century, Finland recorded a fertility rate of 5—6 children per woman, but population growth was hindered by high infant mortality, with approximately 1 in 5 infants dying before their first birthday. Fertility remained relatively steady in the 19th century, with occasional variations. During times of conflict, such as the Finnish war, and periods of famine, birth rates declined, but eventually normalised. Presently, some developing countries have fertility rates similar to those of Finland in the 18th and 19th centuries.

As the 19th century drew to a close, the traditional agrarian society began to crumble. Simultaneously, the industrial and service sectors witnessed a surge in job opportunities, and urban migration intensified. Manufacturing plants mushroomed in proximity to rivers. Fewer children being born played a role in the rising living standards. However, contraceptive methods were limited to the rhythm method and interrupted intercourse.

Total fertility rate (TFR) in Finland from 1776 to 1899
Years
1776	1777	1778	1779	1780	1781	1782	1783	1784	1785	1786	1787	1788	1789	1790	1791	1792	1793
5.42	5.51	5.82	5.91	5.71	5.17	5.74	5.42	5.79	5.39	5.6	5.46	4.86	4.51	4.88	4.66	5.43	5.71
1794	1795	1796	1797	1798	1799	1800	1801	1802	1803	1804	1805	1806	1807	1808	1809	1810	1811
5.41	5.18	5.05	5.2	5.08	5.09	4.92	5.07	5.23	4.78	5.24	5.21	4.84	4.97	4.16	3.69	5.1	4.66
1812	1813	1814	1815	1816	1817	1818	1819	1820	1821	1822	1823	1824	1825	1826	1827	1828	1829
4.95	4.6	4.72	4.84	4.82	4.84	4.78	4.51	4.55	5.34	4.59	5.21	4.84	4.83	4.89	4.77	5.12	4.98
1830	1831	1832	1833	1834	1835	1836	1837	1838	1839	1840	1841	1842	1843	1844	1845	1846	1847
4.85	4.58	4.47	3.96	4.75	4.57	4.17	4.17	4.32	4.47	4.59	4.56	4.96	4.77	4.64	4.76	4.39	4.46
1848	1849	1850	1851	1852	1853	1854	1855	1856	1857	1858	1859	1860	1861	1862	1863	1864	1865
4.84	4.92	4.78	5.17	4.79	4.8	5.02	4.82	4.86	4.48	4.87	4.74	4.84	5.2	5.03	4.85	5.28	4.79
1866	1867	1868	1869	1870	1871	1872	1873	1874	1875	1876	1877	1878	1879	1880	1881	1882	1883
4.46	4.47	3.4	4.52	4.86	4.95	4.87	4.97	5.12	4.95	4.97	5.19	4.81	5.14	5.01	4.79	4.99	4.96
1884	1885	1886	1887	1888	1889	1890	1891	1892	1893	1894	1895	1896	1897	1898	1899		
5.04	4.79	4.98	5.17	5.07	4.89	4.83	5.04	4.65	4.43	4.59	4.87	4.8	4.77	5.07	4.96		

The decline in fertility experienced a noteworthy acceleration in the early 20th century. In 1900, the fertility rate stood at 4.8, which plummeted to 2.3 by 1933. In the late 1930s, fertility rates experienced an uptick, but it later plummeted due to the war, particularly in 1940 as a result of the Winter War. Although the ceasefire caused a spike in births, the resumption of hostilities stalled family planning efforts. Post-war in autumn 1944, there was a resurgence in births, leading to a total fertility rate of 3.1 in 1945, reaching a peak of 3.5 in 1947–1948, a record that remains unbroken. However, fertility rates began a steady decline, dipping below the generational renewal threshold of 2.1 by 1969. Finnish fertility rates have not recovered to this level since.

The decline persisted until 1973, when it hit a historic low of 1.5 children per woman. In recent years, there have been fluctuations, with fertility rates fluctuating between 1.7 and 1.9. As of the 2020s, Finland's overall fertility rate has fallen below 1.4.

Total fertility rate (TFR) in Finland from 1900 to 2022
Years
1900	1901	1902	1903	1904	1905	1906	1907	1908	1909	1910	1911	1912	1913	1914	1915	1916	1917
4.83	4.92	4.79	4.62	4.85	4.67	4.81	4.76	4.65	4.72	4.60	4.46	4.45	4.15	4.13	3.89	3.69	3.71
1918	1919	1920	1921	1922	1923	1924	1925	1926	1927	1928	1929	1930	1931	1932	1933	1934	1935
3.60	2.87	3.76	3.58	3.43	3.44	3.22	3.17	3.02	2.92	2.92	2.83	2.75	2.59	2.46	2.27	2.33	2.37
1936	1937	1938	1939	1940	1941	1942	1943	1944	1945	1946	1947	1948	1949	1950	1951	1952	1953
2.31	2.52	2.52	2.56	2.15	2.90	2.00	2.46	2.56	3.07	3.41	3.47	3.47	3.33	3.16	3.01	3.06	2.96
1954	1955	1956	1957	1958	1959	1960	1961	1962	1963	1964	1965	1966	1967	1968	1969	1970	1971
2.93	2.93	2.91	2.86	2.68	2.75	2.71	2.65	2.66	2.66	2.58	2.46	2.41	2.32	2.15	1.94	1.83	1.70
1972	1973	1974	1975	1976	1977	1978	1979	1980	1981	1982	1983	1984	1985	1986	1987	1988	1989
1.59	1.50	1.62	1.69	1.72	1.69	1.65	1.64	1.63	1.65	1.72	1.74	1.70	1.64	1.60	1.59	1.70	1.71
1990	1991	1992	1993	1994	1995	1996	1997	1998	1999	2000	2001	2002	2003	2004	2005	2006	2007
1.78	1.79	1.85	1.81	1.85	1.81	1.76	1.75	1.70	1.73	1.73	1.73	1.72	1.76	1.80	1.80	1.84	1.83
2008	2009	2010	2011	2012	2013	2014	2015	2016	2017	2018	2019	2020	2021	2022	2023		
1.85	1.86	1.87	1.83	1.80	1.75	1.71	1.65	1.57	1.49	1.41	1.35	1.37	1.46	1.32	1.26		

The fertility rate in Finland exceeded that of neighbouring countries for the duration of the 20th century. However, since 2010, there has been a significant decline, whereas other Nordic countries have not experienced such a trend until more recently. It is a recent development that Sweden and Finland have similar social policies and incomes, however, Finland is the only country experiencing natural population decrease (excluding immigration).

=== Age ===
Life expectancy in Finland since 1755

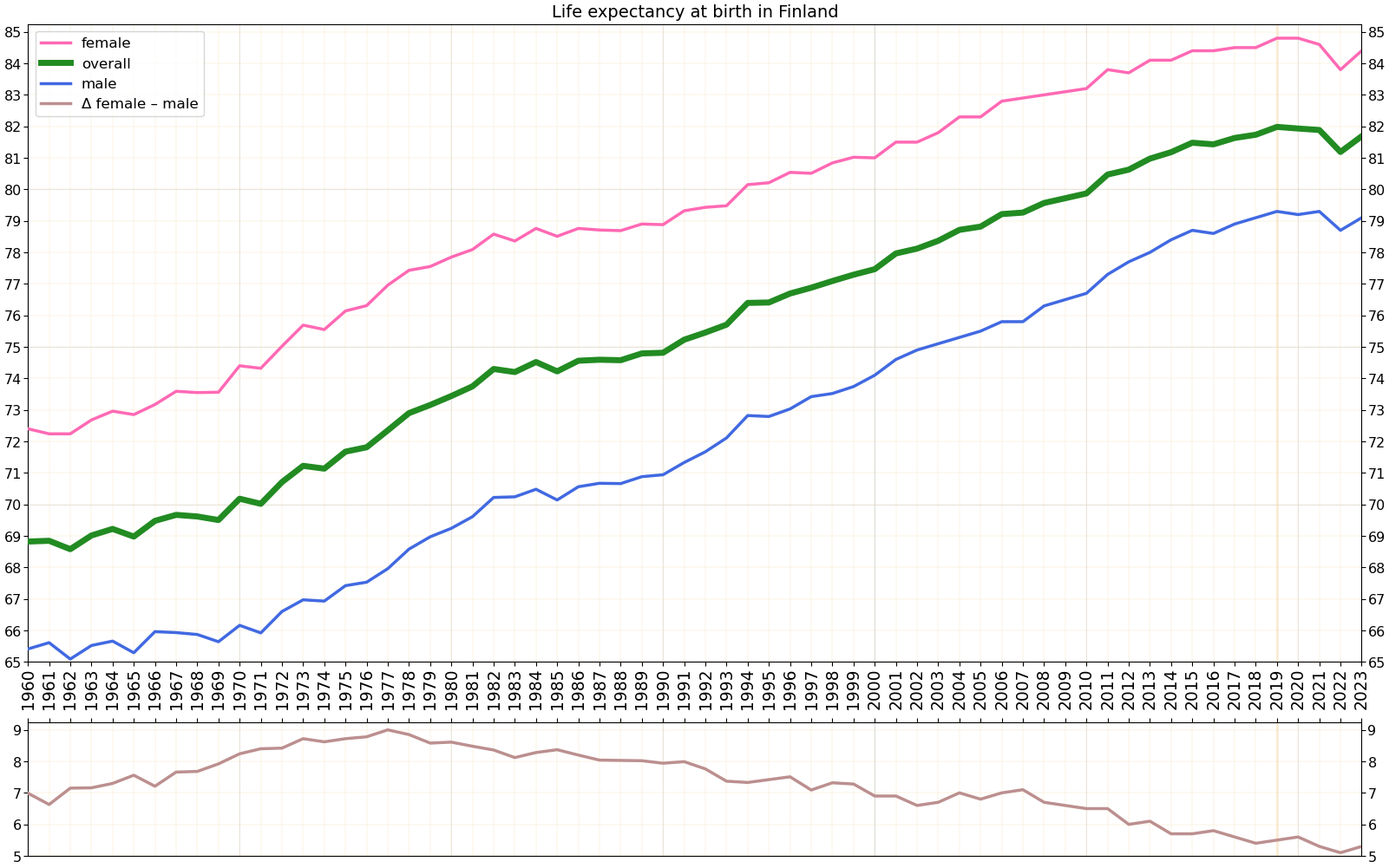
Life expectancy in Finland since 1960 by gender

Live births and deaths over time

Crude birth rate and death rate over time

The Finnish population is ageing. Life expectancy has also increased in recent decades. Population growth has mainly been driven by immigration. Furthermore, the population is increasingly concentrated in urban areas in southern and western Finland.

- As of 2025, the average age of the Finnish population was 44.1 years, with an average age of 42.7 years for men and 45.2 years for women.
- As of 2020, the average age of death was 75.3 for men and 82.1 for women, indicating a margin of 6.9 years.
- As of 2022, infant mortality was very low in Finland. There were two deaths per thousand live births, with 2.3 deaths per thousand for male infants and 1.8 deaths per thousand for female infants.

Age structure as of 2022
Age	Population	Of total population (%)
Under 4	238,282	4.3
5–9	285,852	5.1
10–14	316,194	5.7
15–19	307,960	5.5
20–24	304,385	5.5
25–29	344,950	6.2
30–34	372,101	6.7
35–39	363,619	6.5
40–44	356,657	6.4
45–49	334,702	6.0
50–54	326,045	5.9
55–59	364009	6.5
60–64	354,703	6.4
65–69	349,928	6.3
70–74	343,733	6.2
75–79	273,662	4.9
80–84	168,074	3.0
Over 85	159,114	2.9

=== Life expectancy and mortality ===
In the mid-18th century, when population statistics were initially recorded, Finland recorded an annual death rate of over 10,000, with yearly fluctuations. The overall mortality rate was at 26 and men had a life expectancy of 36.1 years during the 1750s, while women had an expectancy of 38.4 years. The gender gap in life expectancy was a few years at that time.

The rapid spread of various infectious diseases such as cholera caused mortality up until the 1870s. The war years significantly increased mortality rates in the civilian population. During this time, the highest mortality rates were recorded during the Finnish War of 1808–09 and the cholera outbreak of 1832–33, which caused the deaths of a significant portion of the population. The years 1867–68 were marked as years of high death rates, with the latter year seeing a peak of 137,700 deaths.

Life expectancy in Finland from 1755 to 1899
Years
1755	1765	1775	1785	1795	1805	1815	1825	1835	1845	1855	1865	1875	1878	1879	1880	1881	1882
37.3	34.9	39.4	33.8	37.1	31.8	35.8	38.4	34.7	40.5	35.1	32.1	41.6	39.2	44.9	39.6	37.6	40.4
1883	1884	1885	1886	1887	1888	1889	1890	1891	1892	1893	1894	1895	1896	1897	1898	1899	
42.7	42.8	41.3	40.8	45.5	45.1	44.9	44.6	42.5	39.7	43.3	45.2	47.6	46.5	48.1	48.0	44.3	

Before the turn of the 20th century, mortality rates were notably high, but they gradually decreased thereafter. During that time period, the life expectancy of a newborn saw a significant increase to 42.8 years for men and 45.7 years for women. The gender gap in life expectancy already stood at three years. Starting from the beginning of the 20th century, improvements in hygiene, prevention of communicable diseases, and advancements in vaccinations and medicines played crucial roles in accelerating the decline in mortality rates, as compared to previous decades. On the eve of World War II, life expectancy for males stood at 53.4 years and for females, 59.0 years, constituting a five-year gap between them. The life expectancy took almost two centuries to increase by 20 years since the 18th century. In contrast, the succeeding two decades only required 40 years to attain the same growth by the mid-20th century.

Life expectancy in Finland from 1900 to 1950
Years
1900	1901	1902	1903	1904	1905	1906	1907	1908	1909	1910	1911	1912	1913	1914	1915	1916	1917
41.7	42.8	46.2	46.6	47.2	46.0	47.0	46.7	46.1	48.6	48.5	48.7	49.1	49.0	49.7	49.5	48.0	46.5
1918	1919	1920	1921	1922	1923	1924	1925	1926	1927	1928	1929	1930	1931	1932	1933	1934	1935
32.8	43.1	47.5	52.4	51.9	52.5	50.2	53.4	53.8	51.8	53.7	51.3	54.5	54.9	55.8	55.4	56.0	54.4
1936	1937	1938	1939	1940	1941	1942	1943	1944	1945	1946	1947	1948	1949	1950			
56.2	57.1	57.2	54.6	46.6	46.5	54.0	56.3	48.0	57.2	60.2	60.5	62.0	61.9	64.2			

Life expectancy in Finland from 1971 to 2022
1971	1972	1973	1974	1975	1976	1977	1978	1979	1980	1981	1982	1983	1984	1985	1986	1987	1988
70.1	70.8	71.3	71.2	71.7	72.0	72.5	73.3	73.3	73.6	73.9	74.5	74.4	74.7	74.4	74.7	74.8	74.8
1989	1990	1991	1992	1993	1994	1995	1996	1997	1998	1999	2000	2001	2002	2003	2004	2005	2006
75.0	75.0	75.4	75.6	75.9	76.6	76.6	76.9	77.1	77.3	77.5	77.7	78.1	78.3	78.5	78.8	79.0	79.4
2007	2008	2009	2010	2011	2012	2013	2014	2015	2016	2017	2018	2019	2020	2021	2022*		
79.4	79.7	79.8	80.0	80.4	80.5	80.9	81.1	81.4	81.3	81.5	81.6	81.9	81.8	81.8	81.2		

== Vital statistics ==
Data from Statistics Finland, which is the official agency for the collection of statistics in Finland.. The Old Finland (Vanha Suomi) territories were incorporated into the new Grand Duchy of Finland in 1811.

Notable events in Finnish demographics:

- 1808–1809 – Finnish War and Treaty of Fredrikshamn
- 1831–1837 – Cholera years
- 1866–1868 – Finnish famine of 1866–1868
- 1918 – Finnish Civil War
- 1918–1919 – Spanish Flu
- 1939–1940 – Winter War
- 1941–1944 – Continuation War
- 1945–1950 – Post-World War II baby boom

Year	Average population	Live births	Deaths	Natural change	Crude birth rate (per 1000)	Crude death rate (per 1000)	Natural change (per 1000)	Crude migration change (per 1000)	Total fertility rate (Note: In fertility rates, 2.1 and above is a stable population and has been marked blue, 2 and below leads to an aging population and the result is that the population decreases.)
1800	832,659	31,139	21,086	10,053	37.40	25.32	12.07		4.92
1801	848,906	33,297	18,321	14,976	39.24	21.57	17.64	1.51	5.07
1802	864,695	33,650	19,132	14,518	38.93	22.13	16.79	1.48	5.23
1803	868,186	30,871	28,652	2,219	35.56	33.01	2.56	1.47	4.78
1804	881,763	34,216	21,911	12,305	38.79	24.85	13.96	1.45	5.24
1805	898,364	34,200	18,872	15,328	38.07	21.01	17.06	1.43	5.21
1806	905,607	32,191	19,765	12,426	35.55	21.82	13.72	−5.75	4.84
1807	906,787	32,787	26,424	6,363	36.17	29.14	7.02	−5.72	4.97
1808	874,772	27,110	53,942	−26,832	31.00	61.69	−30.69	−5.82	4.16
1809	854,785	24,917	51,531	−26,614	29.15	60.27	−31.12	7.66	3.69
1810	863,301	34,831	21,132	13,699	40.35	24.49	15.87	−6.03	5.10
1811	1,053,374	31,542	26,666	4,876	29.95	25.31	4.63	193.25	4.66
1812	1,069,261	41,236	25,548	15,688	38.56	23.89	14.67	0.19	4.95
1813	1,078,332	38,175	29,303	8,872	35.39	27.16	8.23	0.19	4.60
1814	1,083,230	39,703	35,004	4,699	36.65	32.31	4.34	0.18	4.72
1815	1,095,957	40,898	28,370	12,528	37.33	25.88	11.43	0.18	4.84
1816	1,114,705	42,863	25,829	17,034	38.45	23.17	15.28	1.55	4.82
1817	1,133,326	43,863	26,956	16,907	38.70	23.79	14.92	1.52	4.84
1818	1,150,654	43,918	28,304	15,614	38.17	24.61	13.57	1.50	4.78
1819	1,162,648	41,747	31,468	10,279	35.88	27.07	8.84	1.48	4.51
1820	1,177,546	42,789	29,606	13,183	36.34	25.15	11.20	1.47	4.55
1821	1,199,918	49,165	27,241	21,924	41.00	22.72	18.27	0.38	5.38
1822	1,209,729	42,898	33,535	9,363	35.47	27.72	7.74	0.37	4.59
1823	1,229,768	49,168	29,578	19,590	39.98	24.05	15.93	0.37	5.21
1824	1,243,201	46,726	33,742	12,984	37.58	27.14	10.45	0.36	4.84
1825	1,259,151	48,120	32,619	15,501	38.22	25.91	12.32	0.36	4.83
1826	1,274,744	47,675	31,934	15,741	37.41	25.05	12.35	−0.12	4.89
1827	1,294,132	47,142	27,606	19,536	36.44	21.33	15.10	−0.12	4.77
1828	1,315,779	51,261	29,466	21,795	38.96	22.38	16.56	−0.11	5.12
1829	1,332,028	51,202	34,804	16,398	38.44	26.13	12.31	−0.11	4.98
1830	1,372,077	48,964	33,968	14,996	35.69	24.76	10.93	18.53	4.85
1831	1,381,901	48,531	39,312	9,219	35.13	28.45	6.67	0.44	4.58
1832	1,383,465	47,696	46,737	959	34.47	33.78	0.69	0.44	4.47
1833	1,361,824	41,492	63,738	−22,246	30.48	46.81	−16.33	0.44	3.96
1834	1,379,842	50,238	32,825	17,413	36.42	23.80	12.63	0.44	4.75
1835	1,393,727	47,525	34,245	13,280	34.10	24.57	9.53	0.44	4.57
1836	1,392,367	43,290	44,397	−1,107	31.08	31.89	−0.80	−0.18	4.17
1837	1,396,640	44,080	39,553	4,527	31.55	28.32	3.24	−0.18	4.17
1838	1,409,445	44,652	31,593	13,059	31.68	22.41	9.27	−0.18	4.32
1839	1,427,804	47,804	29,190	18,614	33.47	20.45	13.03	−0.18	4.47
1840	1,445,626	49,794	31,717	18,077	34.45	21.94	12.51	−0.18	4.59
1841	1,463,071	49,440	32,550	16,890	33.79	22.25	11.55	0.38	4.56
1842	1,486,136	54,806	32,296	22,510	36.86	21.72	15.14	0.38	4.96
1843	1,507,010	53,597	33,278	20,319	35.56	22.09	13.47	0.37	4.77
1844	1,527,543	53,124	33,147	19,977	34.78	21.71	13.08	0.37	4.64
1845	1,547,724	54,884	35,259	19,625	35.46	22.78	12.68	0.36	4.76
1846	1,561,050	51,604	38,984	12,620	33.06	24.99	8.08	0.45	4.39
1847	1,578,436	53,211	36,531	16,680	33.71	23.16	10.56	0.45	4.46
1848	1,599,279	58,021	37,885	20,136	36.27	23.68	12.58	0.44	4.84
1849	1,620,851	60,320	39,456	20,864	37.22	24.35	12.87	0.44	4.92
1850	1,636,915	58,269	42,913	15,356	35.60	26.21	9.38	0.43	4.78
1851	1,657,610	62,955	39,107	23,848	37.98	23.59	14.39	-1.91	5.17
1852	1,662,790	58,069	49,736	8,333	34.92	29.91	5.01	−1.90	4.79
1853	1,669,191	58,398	48,844	9,554	34.97	29.26	5.72	−1.89	4.80
1854	1,685,488	62,949	43,498	19,451	37.34	25.82	11.53	−1.88	5.02
1855	1,688,705	60,370	53,998	6,372	35.74	31.98	3.77	−1.87	4.82
1856	1,693,283	61,319	57,438	3,881	36.19	33.92	2.29	0.41	4.86
1857	1,694,447	55,610	55,143	467	32.82	32.55	0.28	0.41	4.48
1858	1,706,774	62,070	50,440	11,630	36.36	29.56	6.81	0.41	4.87
1859	1,725,957	61,454	42,969	18,485	35.61	24.89	10.71	0.41	4.74
1860	1,746,725	63,183	43,113	20,070	36.17	24.68	11.49	0.40	4.84
1861	1,770,643	66,534	41,845	24,689	37.58	23.64	13.94	−0.44	5.20
1862	1,786,194	66,328	50,005	16,323	37.11	28.01	9.13	−0.43	5.03
1863	1,797,421	64,983	52,984	11,999	36.13	29.48	6.68	−0.43	4.85
1864	1,826,981	71,307	40,975	30,332	39.03	22.43	16.60	−0.43	5.28
1865	1,843,245	62,780	45,743	17,037	34.06	24.81	9.25	−0.42	4.79
1866	1,837,506	58,853	61,894	−3,041	32.03	33.70	−1.66	−1.47	4.46
1867	1,824,198	59,164	69,774	−10,610	32.45	38.27	−5.82	−1.47	4.47
1868	1,727,538	43,757	137,720	−93,963	25.33	79.72	−54.39	−1.52	3.40
1869	1,739,560	58,395	43,675	14,720	33.57	25.10	8.47	−1.56	4.52
1870	1,768,769	63,748	31,841	31,907	36.05	18.01	18.04	−1.54	4.86
1871	1,803,845	66,567	31,958	34,609	36.90	17.73	19.18	0.26	4.95
1872	1,834,611	66,189	35,889	30,300	36.09	19.57	16.52	0.26	4.87
1873	1,859,976	68,422	43,525	24,897	36.78	23.40	13.39	0.25	4.97
1874	1,886,117	70,898	45,225	25,673	37.59	23.99	13.61	0.25	5.12
1875	1,912,647	69,521	43,458	26,063	36.35	22.72	13.63	0.25	4.95
1876	1,942,656	70,759	42,151	28,608	36.43	21.70	14.73	0.73	4.97
1877	1,971,431	74,831	47,458	27,373	37.96	24.07	13.89	0.72	5.19
1878	1,994,573	70,275	47,739	22,536	35.24	23.95	11.29	0.31	4.81
1879	2,032,669	76,150	39,468	36,682	37.47	19.41	18.06	0.70	5.14
1880	2,060,782	74,784	48,857	25,927	36.30	23.71	12.59	1.07	5.01
1881	2,082,643	72,436	51,744	20,692	34.78	24.84	9.94	0.56	4.79
1882	2,113,302	76,053	46,821	29,232	36.00	22.15	13.84	0.68	4.99
1883	2,146,395	76,378	44,291	32,087	35.59	20.63	14.95	0.47	4.96
1884	2,180,547	78,147	45,204	32,943	35.84	20.74	15.10	0.56	5.04
1885	2,208,518	75,129	48,261	26,868	34.01	21.86	12.16	0.50	4.79
1886	2,238,572	78,576	49,514	29,062	35.12	22.12	12.99	0.45	4.98
1887	2,278,140	81,724	42,875	38,849	35.86	18.82	17.05	0.32	5.17
1888	2,314,179	80,172	45,417	34,755	34.63	19.63	15.01	0.56	5.07
1889	2,347,702	77,881	45,679	32,202	33.19	19.46	13.73	0.57	4.89
1890	2,380,140	77,860	46,479	31,381	32.72	19.52	13.20	0.45	4.83
1891	2,408,300	82,128	50,715	31,413	34.11	21.06	13.05	-1.36	5.04
1892	2,422,500	76,433	57,486	18,947	31.55	23.74	7.82	−1.97	4.65
1893	2,436,700	73,030	51,002	22,028	29.97	20.94	9.04	−3.2	4.43
1894	2,465,700	76,206	47,467	28,739	30.89	19.25	11.65	0.1	4.59
1895	2,499,900	81,783	44,482	37,301	32.72	17.79	14.93	−1.3	4.87
1896	2,530,900	81,656	47,061	34,595	32.27	18.60	13.67	−1.4	4.80
1897	2,567,500	82,330	45,233	37,097	32.07	17.62	14.45	−0.2	4.77
1898	2,610,300	89,106	45,751	43,355	34.15	17.53	16.62	−0.2	5.07
1899	2,635,300	88,358	53,042	35,316	33.53	20.13	13.40	−3.9	4.96
1900	2,646,000	86,339	57,915	28,424	32.6	21.9	10.7	−6.7	4.83
1901	2,667,000	88,637	56,225	32,412	33.2	21.1	12.2	−4.3	4.92
1902	2,686,000	87,082	50,999	36,083	32.4	19.0	13.4	−6.3	4.79
1903	2,706,000	85,120	49,992	35,128	31.5	18.5	13.0	−5.6	4.62
1904	2,735,000	90,253	50,227	40,026	33.0	18.4	14.7	−4.0	4.85
1905	2,762,000	87,841	52,773	35,068	31.8	19.1	12.7	−2.8	4.67
1906	2,788,000	91,401	50,857	40,544	32.8	18.2	14.5	−5.1	4.81
1907	2,821,000	92,457	53,028	39,429	32.8	18.8	14.0	−2.2	4.76
1908	2,861,000	92,146	55,305	36,841	32.2	19.3	12.9	1.3	4.65
1909	2,899,000	95,005	50,577	44,428	32.8	17.4	15.3	−2.0	4.72
1910	2,929,000	92,984	51,007	41,977	31.7	17.4	14.3	−4.0	4.60
1911	2,962,000	91,238	51,648	39,590	30.8	17.4	13.4	−2.1	4.46
1912	2,998,000	92,275	51,645	40,630	30.8	17.2	13.5	−1.3	4.45
1913	3,026,000	87,250	51,876	35,374	28.8	17.1	11.7	−2.3	4.15
1914	3,053,000	87,577	50,690	36,887	28.7	16.6	12.1	−3.2	4.13
1915	3,083,000	83,306	52,205	31,101	27.0	16.9	10.1	−0.3	3.89
1916	3,105,000	79,653	54,577	25,076	25.7	17.6	8.1	−1.0	3.69
1917	3,124,000	81,046	58,863	22,183	25.9	18.8	7.1	−1.0	3.71
1918	3,125,000	79,494	95,102	−15,608	25.4	30.4	−5.0	5.3	3.60
1919	3,117,000	63,896	62,932	964	20.5	20.2	0.3	−2.9	2.87
1920	3,133,000	84,714	53,304	31,410	27.0	17.0	10.0	−4.9	3.76
1921	3,170,000	82,165	47,361	34,804	25.9	14.9	11.0	0.8	3.58
1922	3,211,000	80,140	49,180	30,960	25.0	15.3	9.6	3.3	3.43
1923	3,243,000	81,961	47,556	34,405	25.3	14.7	10.6	−0.6	3.44
1924	3,272,000	78,057	53,442	24,615	23.9	16.3	7.5	1.4	3.22
1925	3,304,000	78,260	47,493	30,767	23.7	14.4	9.3	0.5	3.17
1926	3,339,000	76,875	47,526	29,349	23.0	14.2	8.8	1.8	3.02
1927	3,368,000	75,611	51,727	23,884	22.5	15.4	7.1	1.6	2.92
1928	3,396,000	77,523	48,713	28,810	22.8	14.3	8.5	−0.2	2.92
1929	3,424,000	76,011	54,489	21,522	22.2	15.9	6.3	1.9	2.83
1930	3,449,000	75,236	48,240	26,996	21.8	14.0	7.8	−0.5	2.75
1931	3,476,000	71,866	48,968	22,898	20.7	14.1	6.6	1.2	2.59
1932	3,503,000	69,352	46,700	22,652	19.8	13.3	6.5	1.3	2.46
1933	3,526,000	65,047	47,960	17,087	18.4	13.6	4.8	1.8	2.27
1934	3,549,000	67,713	46,318	21,395	19.1	13.1	6.0	0.5	2.33
1935	3,576,000	69,942	45,370	24,572	19.6	12.7	6.9	1.5	2.37
1936	3,601,000	68,895	49,124	19,771	19.1	13.6	5.5	0.7	2.31
1937	3,626,000	72,319	46,466	25,853	19.9	12.8	7.1	−0.2	2.52
1938	3,656,000	76,695	46,930	29,765	21.0	12.8	8.1	0.2	2.52
1939	3,686,000	78,164	52,614	25,550	21.2	14.3	6.9	1.9	2.56
1940	3,698,000	65,849	71,846	−5,997	17.8	19.4	−1.6	4.9	2.15
1941	3,702,000	89,565	73,334	16,231	24.2	19.8	4.4	−3.3	2.90
1942	3,708,000	61,672	56,141	5,531	16.6	15.1	1.5	0.1	2.00
1943	3,721,000	76,112	49,634	26,478	20.5	13.3	−3.6	7.1	2.46
1944	3,735,000	79,446	70,570	8,876	21.3	18.9	2.4	1.4	2.56
1945	3,758,000	95,758	49,046	46,712	25.5	13.1	12.4	−6.2	3.07
1946	3,806,000	106,075	44,748	61,327	27.9	11.8	16.1	−3.3	3.41
1947	3,859,000	108,168	46,053	62,115	28.0	11.9	16.1	−2.2	3.47
1948	3,912,000	107,759	43,668	64,091	27.5	11.2	16.4	−2.7	3.47
1949	3,963,000	103,515	44,501	59,014	26.1	11.2	14.9	−1.9	3.33
1950	4,009,000	98,065	40,681	57,384	24.5	10.1	14.3	−2.7	3.16
1951	4,047,000	93,063	40,386	52,677	23.0	10.0	13.0	−3.5	3.01
1952	4,090,000	94,314	39,024	55,290	23.1	9.5	13.5	−2.9	3.06
1953	4,139,000	90,866	39,925	50,941	22.0	9.6	12.3	−0.3	2.96
1954	4,187,000	89,845	37,988	51,857	21.5	9.1	12.4	−0.8	2.93
1955	4,235,000	89,740	39,573	50,167	21.2	9.3	11.8	−0.3	2.93
1956	4,282,000	88,896	38,713	50,183	20.8	9.0	11.7	−0.6	2.91
1957	4,324,000	86,985	40,741	46,244	20.1	9.4	10.7	−0.9	2.86
1958	4,360,000	81,148	38,833	42,315	18.6	8.9	9.7	−1.4	2.68
1959	4,395,000	83,253	38,827	44,426	18.9	8.8	10.1	−2.1	2.75
1960	4,430,000	82,129	39,797	42,332	18.5	9.0	9.6	−1.6	2.71
1961	4,461,000	81,996	40,616	41,380	18.4	9.1	9.3	−2.3	2.65
1962	4,491,000	81,454	42,889	38,565	18.1	9.5	8.6	−1.9	2.66
1963	4,523,000	82,251	42,010	40,241	18.2	9.3	8.9	−1.8	2.66
1964	4,549,000	80,428	42,512	37,916	17.7	9.3	8.3	−2.6	2.58
1965	4,564,000	77,885	44,473	33,412	17.1	9.7	7.3	−4.0	2.46
1966	4,581,000	77,697	43,548	34,149	17.0	9.5	7.5	−3.8	2.41
1967	4,606,000	77,289	43,790	33,499	16.8	9.5	7.3	−1.8	2.32
1968	4,626,000	73,654	45,013	28,641	15.9	9.7	6.2	−1.9	2.15
1969	4,624,000	67,450	45,966	21,484	14.6	9.9	4.6	−5.0	1.94
1970	4,606,000	64,559	44,119	20,440	14.0	9.6	4.4	−8.3	1.83
1971	4,612,000	61,067	45,876	15,191	13.2	9.9	3.3	−2.0	1.70
1972	4,640,000	58,864	43,958	14,906	12.7	9.5	3.2	2.9	1.59
1973	4,666,000	56,787	43,410	13,377	12.2	9.3	2.9	2.7	1.50
1974	4,691,000	62,472	44,676	17,796	13.3	9.5	3.8	1.6	1.62
1975	4,711,000	65,719	43,828	21,891	14.0	9.3	4.6	−0.3	1.69
1976	4,726,000	66,846	44,786	22,060	14.1	9.5	4.7	−1.5	1.72
1977	4,739,000	65,659	44,065	21,594	13.9	9.3	4.6	−1.8	1.69
1978	4,753,000	63,983	43,692	20,291	13.5	9.2	4.3	−1.3	1.65
1979	4,765,000	63,428	43,738	19,690	13.3	9.2	4.1	−1.6	1.64
1980	4,780,000	63,064	44,398	18,666	13.2	9.3	3.9	−0.8	1.63
1981	4,800,000	63,469	44,404	19,065	13.2	9.3	4.0	0.2	1.65
1982	4,827,000	66,106	43,408	22,698	13.7	9.0	4.7	0.9	1.72
1983	4,856,000	66,892	45,388	21,504	13.8	9.3	4.4	1.6	1.74
1984	4,882,000	65,076	45,098	19,978	13.3	9.2	4.1	1.3	1.70
1985	4,902,000	62,796	48,198	14,598	12.8	9.8	3.0	1.1	1.64
1986	4,918,000	60,632	47,135	13,497	12.3	9.6	2.7	0.6	1.60
1987	4,932,000	59,827	47,949	11,878	12.1	9.7	2.4	0.4	1.59
1988	4,946,000	63,316	49,063	14,253	12.8	9.9	2.9	−0.1	1.70
1989	4,964,000	63,348	49,110	14,238	12.8	9.9	2.9	0.7	1.71
1990	4,998,000	65,549	50,028	15,521	13.1	10.0	3.1	3.7	1.78
1991	5,029,000	65,395	49,294	16,101	13.1	9.8	3.3	2.9	1.79
1992	5,055,000	66,731	49,844	16,887	13.3	9.8	3.4	1.8	1.85
1993	5,078,000	64,826	50,988	13,838	12.8	10.1	2.7	1.8	1.81
1994	5,099,000	65,231	48,000	17,231	12.8	9.4	3.4	0.7	1.85
1995	5,117,000	63,067	49,280	13,787	12.3	9.6	2.7	0.8	1.81
1996	5,132,000	60,723	49,167	11,556	11.8	9.6	2.3	0.6	1.76
1997	5,147,000	59,329	49,108	10,221	11.5	9.6	2.0	0.9	1.75
1998	5,160,000	57,108	49,262	7,846	11.1	9.6	1.5	1.0	1.70
1999	5,171,000	57,574	49,345	8,229	11.1	9.6	1.6	0.5	1.73
2000	5,181,000	56,742	49,339	7,403	11.0	9.5	1.4	0.5	1.73
2001	5,195,000	56,189	48,550	7,639	10.8	9.4	1.5	1.2	1.73
2002	5,206,000	55,555	49,418	6,137	10.7	9.5	1.2	0.9	1.72
2003	5,220,000	56,630	48,996	7,634	10.9	9.4	1.5	1.2	1.76
2004	5,237,000	57,758	47,600	10,158	11.0	9.1	1.9	1.4	1.80
2005	5,256,000	57,745	47,928	9,817	11.0	9.1	1.9	1.7	1.80
2006	5,277,000	58,840	48,065	10,775	11.2	9.1	2.0	2.0	1.84
2007	5,300,000	58,729	49,077	9,652	11.1	9.3	1.8	2.6	1.83
2008	5,326,000	59,530	49,094	10,436	11.2	9.2	2.0	2.9	1.85
2009	5,351,000	60,430	49,883	10,547	11.3	9.3	2.0	2.7	1.86
2010	5,375,000	60,980	50,887	10,193	11.4	9.5	1.9	2.6	1.87
2011	5,401,000	59,961	50,585	9,376	11.1	9.4	1.7	3.1	1.83
2012	5,427,000	59,493	51,707	7,786	11.0	9.6	1.4	3.4	1.80
2013	5,451,000	58,134	51,472	6,662	10.7	9.5	1.2	3.2	1.75
2014	5,472,000	57,232	52,186	5,046	10.5	9.6	0.9	3.0	1.71
2015	5,487,000	55,472	52,492	2,980	10.1	9.6	0.5	2.2	1.65
2016	5,503,000	52,814	53,923	−1,109	9.6	9.8	−0.2	3.1	1.57
2017	5,513,000	50,321	53,722	−3,401	9.1	9.8	−0.7	2.5	1.49
2018	5,517,918	47,577	54,527	−6,950	8.6	9.9	−1.3	2.2	1.41
2019	5,525,292	45,613	53,949	−8,336	8.3	9.8	−1.5	2.8	1.35
2020	5,533,793	46,463	55,488	−9,025	8.4	10.0	−1.6	3.1	1.37
2021	5,548,241	49,594	57,659	−8,065	8.9	10.4	−1.5	4.1	1.46
2022	5,563,970	44,951	63,219	−18,268	8.1	11.3	−3.2	6.0	1.32
2023	5,603,851	43,383	61,339	−17,956	7.7	11.0	−3.3	10.4	1.26
2024	5,635,971	43,720	58,267	−14,547	7.8	10.3	−2.5	8.3	1.25
2025	5,652,881	45,832	59,209	−13,377	8.1	10.5	−2.4	6.2	1.30

=== Births by mother's background country ===
Mother's background	2004	2014	2024
total	57,758	57,232	43,720
Finland	54,799 (94.9%)	51,013 (89.1%)	35,889 (82.1%)
total foreign countries	2,959 (5.1%)	6,219 (10.9%)	7,831 (17.9%)
Europe	1,517 (2.6%)	3,044 (5.3%)	2,860 (6.5%)
Asia	724 (1.3%)	1,758 (3.1%)	3,174 (7.3%)
Africa	460 (0.8%)	1,053 (1.8%)	1,384 (3.2%)
America	95 (0.2%)	168 (0.3%)	173 (0.4%)
Oceania	7	3	11
unknown	156 (0.3%)	193 (0.3%)	229 (0.5%)

=== Current vital statistics ===
Period	Live births	Deaths	Natural increase
January—September 2025	34,224	44,128	–9,904
January—September 2026	36,246	43,270	–7,024
Difference	▲ +2,022 (+5.9%)	▼ –858 (–1.9%)	▲ +2,880

== Languages ==
=== Official and national languages ===
Languages of Finnish municipalities as of 2016. unilingually Finnish bilingual with Finnish as majority language, Swedish as minority language bilingual with Swedish as majority language, Finnish as minority language unilingually Swedish bilingual with Finnish as majority language, Sami as minority language

Finland has two official languages (national languages): Finnish and Swedish. In addition, there are other languages that are officially recognised by the authorities, but are not national languages. The Sámi languages are those of Finland's indigenous people. Indigenous languages with a long history in Finland include Finnish Romani (Kalo), Finnish Sign Language, Finnish-Swedish Sign Language and Karelian. Finnish, which belongs to the Uralic languages, is spoken by approximately 4.9 million people in Finland as a first language and by more than 0.5 million as a second language. It is also spoken in Sweden, Norway, Eastern Karelia, Ingria (Russia), the USA and Australia, with various dialects. Written Finnish dates back 500 years.

Swedish, an Indo-European language within the North Germanic branch, is spoken by approximately 9 million people worldwide, including 284,611 (2025) speakers in Finland. Finland Swedish is a regional variety that aims to remain similar to the Swedish spoken in Sweden. The Sámi languages, which are indigenous to Europe and closely related to the Finnic languages, have approximately 60,000-100,000 speakers, of whom 10,000 live in Finland. There are three Sámi languages in Finland: Inari Sámi, Skolt Sámi and Northern Sámi, each with its own written form. Since 1992 they have had official status in certain areas of Lapland.

Karelian, spoken in Finland and Russia, is the closest linguistic relative of Finnish. There are fewer than 100,000 speakers of Karelian, with approximately 5,000 in Finland. Romani, an Indo-European language, belongs to the Indo-Aryan subgroup of the Indo-Iranian branch. Finnish Romani is one of the Northern Romani dialects and has been spoken in Finland for approximately 450 years. Efforts to preserve it as a literary language began in the 1970s. Finnish Sign Language serves as the primary language for 4,000-5,000 deaf Finns and is used as a first or second language by 6,000-9,000 hearing Finns. Finnish-Swedish Sign Language, on the other hand, is endangered, with only 90 users left.

All mainland municipalities are monolingual in Finnish or bilingual in Finnish and Swedish. None is monolingual Swedish. However, Swedish is the only official language on the autonomous island of Åland.

=== First languages of the foreign population ===
Population by
mother tongue (2025)
1. Finnish (83.5%)
2. Swedish (5.00%)
3. Russian (1.80%)
4. Estonian (0.90%)
5. Ukrainian (0.80%)
6. Arabic (0.80%)
7. English (0.70%)
8. Other (6.50%)

As of 2025, 646,392 people, or 11.4%, live in Finland with a first language other than Finnish, Swedish or Sámi. More than 150 foreign languages are spoken in Finland. However, most of them have only few speakers. Historically, Finland has been a bilingual country where only Finnish or Swedish was spoken. This is slowly changing as the rate of immigration has increased in last three decades. The majority of the Finnish population is able to communicate in English. However, the foreign population is expected to study and speak Finnish or Swedish if they want to integrate into Finnish society.

As of 2025, the most common foreign languages are Russian (1.8%), Estonian (0.9%), Ukrainian (0.8%), Arabic (0.8%), English (0.7%), Somali (0.5%) and Persian (0.4%). Approximately 70% of the country's foreign speakers live in Finland's six largest cities.

Population of Finland according to mother tongue (excluding Åland) 1990–2020

Mother language	Year											
Mother language	1990		1995		2000		2005		2015		2020	
Mother language	Number	%	Number	%	Number	%	Number	%	Number	%	Number	%
Finnish	4,675,223	93.5%	4,754,787	92.9%	4,788,497	92.4%	4,819,819	91.7%	4,865,628	88.7%	4,811,067	86.9%
Swedish	296,738	5.9%	294,664	5.8%	291,657	5.6%	289,675	5.5%	290,161	5.3%	287,871	5.2%
Russian	3,884	0.1%	15,872	0.3%	28,205	0.5%	39,653	0.8%	72,436	1.3%	84,190	1.5%
Estonian	1,394	0%	8,710	0.2%	10,176	0.2%	15,336	0.3%	48,087	0.9%	49,551	0.9%
Arabic	1,138	0%	2,901	0.1%	4,892	0.1%	7,117	0.1%	16,713	0.3%	34,282	0.6%
English	3,569	0.1%	5,324	0.1%	6,919	0.1%	8,928	0.2%	17,784	0.3%	23,433	0.4%
Somali	0	0%	4,057	0.1%	6,454	0.1%	8,593	0.2%	17,871	0.3%	22,794	0.4%
Kurdish	179	0%	1,381	0%	3,115	0.1%	5,123	0.1%	11,271	0.2%	15,368	0.3%
Persian	291	0%	803	0%	1,205	0%	3,165	0.1%	8,745	0.2%	15,105	0.3%
Chinese	790	0%	2,190	0%	2,907	0.1%	4,613	0.1%	10,722	0.2%	13,778	0.2%
Albanian	0	0%	2,019	0%	3,293	0.1%	5,076	0.1%	9,233	0.2%	12,664	0.2%
Vietnamese	1,643	0%	2,785	0.1%	3,588	0.1%	4,202	0.1%	8,273	0.2%	11,562	0.2%
Thai	244	0%	813	0%	1,458	0%	3,033	0.1%	8,582	0.2%	10,553	0.2%
Turkish	848	0%	1,809	0%	2,435	0%	3,595	0.1%	7,082	0.1%	9,492	0.2%
Spanish	894	0%	1,394	0%	1,946	0%	2,937	0.1%	7,025	0.1%	9,151	0.2%
German	2,427	0%	2,719	0.1%	3,298	0.1%	4,114	0.1%	6,168	0.1%	6,841	0.1%
Ukrainian	11	0%	113	0%	337	0%	611	0%		0%	5,961	0.1%
Polish	901	0%	1,129	0%	1,157	0%	1,445	0%		0%	5,695	0.1%
Romanian	94	0%	368	0%	617	0%	909	0%		0%	5,680	0.1%
French	670	0%	1,062	0%	1,585	0%	2,071	0%		0%	4,966	0.1%
Hungarian	573	0%	732	0%	1,089	0%	1,206	0%		0%		0%
Tagalog	118	0%	375	0%	568	0%	764	0%		0%		0%
Bengali	93	0%	373	0%	524	0%	920	0%		0%		0%
Italian	403	0%	574	0%	833	0%	1,177	0%		0%		0%
Portuguese	171	0%	297	0%	433	0%	865	0%		0%		0%
Urdu	79	0%	179	0%	309	0%	594	0%		0%		0%
Bulgarian	230	0%	400	0%	486	0%	629	0%		0%		0%
Bosnian	0	0%	0	0%	0	0%	1,186	0%		0%		0%
Sami	1,734	0%	1,726	0%	1,734	0%	1,752	0%		0%		0%
Hindi	147	0%	239	0%	428	0%	779	0%		0%		0%
Dutch	277	0%	408	0%	650	0%	960	0%		0%		0%
Latvian	20	0%	76	0%	169	0%	391	0%		0%		0%
Japanese	274	0%	386	0%	561	0%	798	0%		0%		0%
Lithuanian	30	0%	94	0%	166	0%	375	0%		0%		0%
Norwegian	402	0%	436	0%	471	0%	540	0%		0%		0%
Danish	290	0%	305	0%	397	0%	456	0%		0%		0%
Hebrew	165	0%	232	0%	263	0%	348	0%		0%		0%
Other	2,534	0.1%	5,084	0.1%	8,293	0.2%	11,825	0.2%	79,570	1.5%		0%

== Immigration ==
=== Net migration of Finland, 1990–present ===
Finland Migration Data
Year	Immigration to Finland	Emigration from Finland	Net migration
1990	13,558	6,477	+7,081
1991	19,001	5,984	+13,017
1992	14,554	6,055	+8,499
1993	14,795	6,405	+8,390
1994	11,611	8,672	+2,939
1995	12,222	8,957	+3,265
1996	13,294	10,587	+2,707
1997	13,564	9,854	+3,710
1998	14,192	10,817	+3,375
1999	14,744	11,966	+2,778
2000	16,895	14,311	+2,584
2001	18,955	13,153	+5,802
2002	18,112	12,891	+5,221
2003	17,838	12,083	+5,755
2004	20,333	13,656	+6,677
2005	21,355	12,369	+8,986
2006	22,451	12,107	+10,344
2007	26,029	12,443	+13,586
2008	29,114	13,657	+15,457
2009	26,699	12,151	+14,548
2010	25,636	11,905	+13,731
2011	29,481	12,660	+16,821
2012	31,278	13,845	+17,433
2013	31,941	13,893	+18,048
2014	31,507	15,486	+16,021
2015	28,746	16,305	+12,441
2016	34,905	18,082	+16,823
2017	31,797	16,973	+14,824
2018	31,106	19,141	+11,965
2019	32,758	17,263	+15,495
2020	32,898	15,084	+17,814
2021	36,364	13,459	+22,905
2022	49,998	15,635	+34,363
2023	73,236	15,322	+57,914
2024	63,965	16,914	+47,051
2025	51,121	19,888	+31,233

=== Statistics of foreign population ===
As of 2025, Statistics Finland produces statistics on foreign nationals in three different ways:

1. Origin and background country: 660,800 people or 11.7%, have a foreign background.
2. Country of birth: 614,401 people, or 10.9%, were born in a foreign country.
3. Language: 646,392 people, or 11.4%, have a first language other than Finnish, Swedish or Sámi.

No official statistics exist on ethnicities. Nonetheless, the Finnish population statistics are available according to the birth countries of the residents' parents (foreign background/origin statistics). International census recommendations define an ethnic group by the perception of its members of historical, regional, or national origin. Therefore, data on ethnic status should always be sourced from a person's own statement. Due to the fact that Finland's census is registry-based, official statistics regarding ethnic groups cannot be provided.

=== Origin and background country ===
Origin and background country – the definition used by Statistics Finland includes all individuals with at least one parent born in Finland as being of Finnish background. Individuals with both parents or only one known parent born abroad are classified as having foreign heritage. If both parents of an individual were born abroad, the mother's country of birth is primarily considered as the background country. For all individuals of Finnish heritage, the background country is Finland. (Note: In 2012, Statistics Finland implemented a classification system for determining origin and background comparable to that employed by other Nordic countries. This system utilizes data on parental birthplaces to differentiate between Finnish natives and foreign-born individuals. Data regarding individuals who passed before 1964 is unavailable in the Population Information System. Approximately 900,000 Finnish-born residents, whose parental birthplaces are unknown due to the pre-system death of their parents, are categorized as Finnish given that their native language is either Finnish, Swedish, or Sámi. Individuals with at least one parent born in Finland are classified as having a Finnish background. For those with foreign-born parents or missing parental data, a foreign background is assigned, regardless of whether they were born in Finland or abroad. In cases where both parents were born abroad, the mother's birthplace takes precedence in determining the background. If only the father's birthplace is known, it is used to determine the background. If the parental data and foreign background of a person born in Finland are unknown, their birthplace is considered their background. However, if someone is born in Finland with unknown parental information and foreign background deduction, their background remains unknown. In the case of internationally adopted children by Finnish-born parents, they are treated as having a Finnish background, with Finland as their birth country.)

Origin and background country of population in Finland by continent 1990–2020

Country or continent	Year							
Country or continent	1990		2000		2010		2020	
Country or continent	Population	%	Population	%	Population	%	Population	%
Europe	5,032,796	99.6%	5,149,522	99.1%	5,295,964	98.1%	5,318,746	95.9%
Finland	4,960,860	99.2%	5,067,870	97.8%	5,138,210	95.6%	5,089,762	92.0%
EU (excluding Finnish origin)	5,003	0.1%	9,200	0.2%	43,295	0.8%	38,753	0.7%
Other Europe	17,114	0.3%	62,269	1.2%	97,249	1.8%	191,099	3.5%
AFRICA	1,720	0.0%	11,802	0.2%	29,041	0.5%	57,496	1.0%
AMERICA	3,156	0.1%	4,457	0.1%	7,649	0.1%	13,169	0.2%
ASIA	5,250	0.1%	20,212	0.4%	54,547	1.0%	132,903	2.4%
OCEANIA	136	0.0%	359	0.0%	678	0.0%	1,042	0.0%
UNKNOWN	5,239	0.1%	4,946	0.1%	4,607	0.1%	9,569	0.2%
Total: Foreign countries	37,618	0.8%	113,245	2.2%	237,066	4.4%	444,031	8.0%
Total	4,998,478	100%	5,181,115	100%	5,375,276	100%	5,533,793	100%

=== Country of birth ===
Population pyramid of Finland by origin groups in 2021

Finnish and foreign born population pyramid in 2021

Finnish background

Foreign born

Foreign born descendants

The definition used by Statistics Finland for country of birth is based on the mother's country of permanent residence at the time of birth. Consequently, Estonian immigrants born before Estonian independence are recorded as being born in the Soviet Union, and those born in territories ceded by Finland are listed as being born in Finland, regardless of subsequent territorial changes. This information reflects the government in power at the time of birth and is devoid of subjective evaluations.

Country of birth (2025)	Population	%
Finland	5,038,480	89.1%
Soviet Union	84,504	1.5%
Estonia	45,604	0.8%
Sweden	34,577	0.6%
Ukraine	27,542	0.5%
Russia	23,530	0.4%
Iraq	23,474	0.4%
Philippines	19,418	0.3%
China	19,023	0.3%
India	18,090	0.3%
Somalia	15,362	0.3%
Vietnam	15,147	0.3%
Thailand	14,003	0.2%
Iran	13,633	0.2%
Turkey	12,975	0.2%
Bangladesh	11,752	0.2%
Afghanistan	11,437	0.2%
Nepal	10,998	0.2%
Sri Lanka	10,728	0.2%
Syria	9,611	0.2%
Yugoslavia	9,567	0.2%
Pakistan	9,229	0.2%
Germany	8,348	0.1%
United Kingdom	7,994	0.1%
United States	7,329	0.1%
Nigeria	6,763	0.1%
Poland	5,600	0.1%
Romania	5,438	0.1%
Latvia	4,295	0.1%
Italy	4,011	0.1%
Spain	3,828	0.1%
Ethiopia	3,804	0.1%
Morocco	3,731	0.1%
France	3,498	0.1%
Kenya	3,124	0.1%
Myanmar	3,090	0.1%
Hungary	2,998	0.1%
DR Congo	2,938	0.1%
Bulgaria	2,926	0.1%

== Emigration ==
Map of the Finnish diaspora in the world (includes people with Finnish ancestry or citizenship). Finland + 100,000 + 10,000 + 1,000

Historically, Finnish emigration began in the 16th century, when Finns worked in Swedish mines, and continued until the 1970s. About 100,000 Finns emigrated to Russia during the Tsarist period, mainly to St Petersburg. Large-scale emigration began in the late 19th century, with about 400,000 Finns moving to the United States and Canada by 1980. After the Second World War, many Finns emigrated to Sweden, reaching a peak in 1970 when 41,000 settled there. An estimated 250,000 to 300,000 Finns became permanent residents of Sweden after the war. However, migration slowed in the 1980s, with more Finns returning than leaving.

The impact of emigration on the Finnish labour force and birth rate has been significant. Finland has experienced two major waves of emigration: one at the beginning of the 20th century, when more than 300,000 Finns went to North America, and another from the 1950s to the 1970s, when 400,000 Finns moved to Sweden, forming large expatriate communities.

Apart from these major flows, there have been smaller migrations around the world and some Finns live in different countries. In the 21st century about 14,000 people, mostly of Finnish origin, emigrate every year. Many are well-educated and may return to Finland after a few years. About 300,000 Finnish citizens live abroad and it is estimated that about 1.5 million people of Finnish origin live overseas.

== Internal migration ==
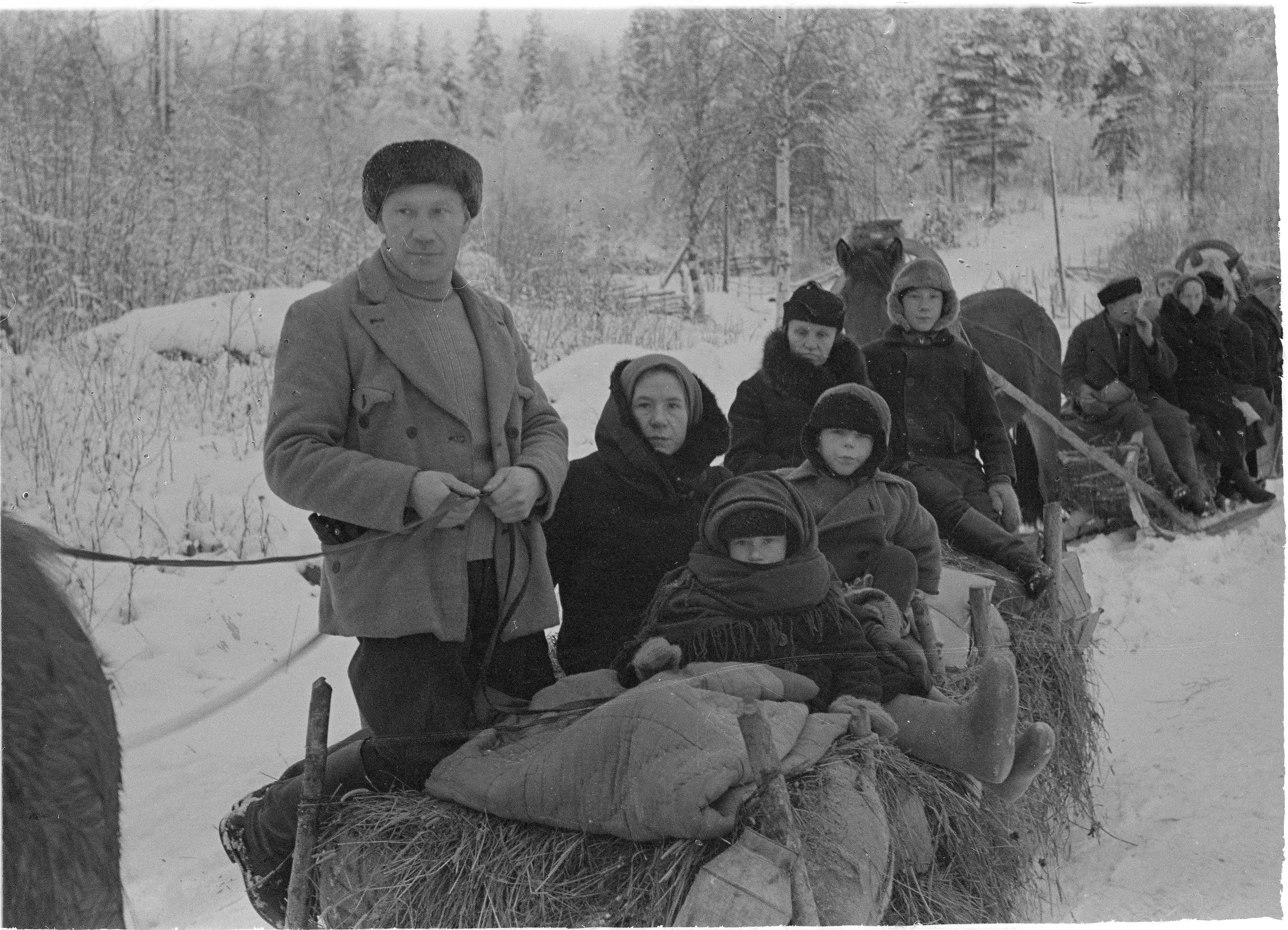
Evacuation on the Karelian Isthmus in the early days of the Winter War.

Migration has played an important role in shaping Finnish society throughout its history. Notable instances are the Forest Finns' migration to Sweden during the 15th century and the relocation of Ingrians to the present-day St Petersburg region during the 17th century. Changes in borders resulted in the formation of Finnish settlements outside its territory. Wars and political conflicts led to massive population movements, such as the Karelian evacuation during World War II, which exiled roughly 420,000 individuals within Finland's borders.

Until the 1960s, Finland was predominantly an agricultural society. However, waves of urbanization and political transitions have contributed to migration movements. Currently, urbanization continues to be a significant internal migration pattern, with growth centers and sparsely populated regions. Approximately 250,000 people, mainly young adults, make annual municipal moves, which have notable implications for regional development in the 21st century.

== Religion ==
Registered members of religions groups in Finland by the Statistics Finland (2025)
1. Evangelical Lutheran Church (61.2%)
2. Orthodox Church (1.00%)
3. Other Christian (1.00%)
4. Islam (0.50%)
5. Other Religions (0.40%)
6. Unaffiliated (35.9%)

Before Christianisation, Finnish paganism prevailed, venerating deities such as Ukko, the god of thunder and sky. Currently, most of the Finnish population consider themselves nominal Christians, though the proportion of non-religious individuals has increased since the 1980s. As of 2025, 61.2% of the population were affiliated with the Evangelical Lutheran Church, 1.0% with the Orthodox Church, 0.5% Islam and 1.4% were members of another religious group. A total of 35.9% have no religious affiliation. The Evangelical Lutheran Church and the Orthodox Church are both entitled to collect church tax. There are around 140 registered religious communities, including Catholicism, and Jehovah's Witnesses.

In Finland, there are also revival movements, which began as spiritual reform movements and are now organized and active within the Evangelical Lutheran Church of Finland. The historic Finnish revivalist movements emerged in the late 1700s and 1800s and consisted of the Prayer Movement, the Awakened Movement, the Lutheran Evangelical Movement, and the Laestadian Movement. These movements laid out an important religious and social influence on Finnish society during this period.

Religious freedom is highly valued in Finland and all residents have the right to choose and practice their faith. Religious education is mandatory in Finnish schools, customized to a student's registered denomination if there are a minimum of three pupils who profess that religion.

== Education ==
The Finnish educational framework encompasses several developmental phases, from early childhood through pre-primary, primary, and lower secondary (basic education), to gymnasium (lukio), vocational, higher, and adult education. Compulsory education is mandatory for 6 to 18-year-olds, covering pre-primary to upper secondary levels.

Upon completion of the nine-year basic education, students may opt between gymnasium, culminating in a matriculation exam, or vocational upper secondary, culminating in a vocational qualification. Higher education in Finland consists of universities and universities of applied sciences, which place emphasis on education and research. While universities are authorized to grant doctorates, universities of applied sciences offer vocational education and practical research.

In 2012 OECD survey, adults aged 16 to 65 in Finland exhibit exceptional literacy, numeracy, and problem-solving skills in technology compared to other countries surveyed. Young adults aged 16–24 have above-average literacy, whereas those aged 55–65 perform at an average level, resulting in a massive 37-point age-related gap. In contrast, foreign-language immigrants in Finland demonstrate lower literacy proficiency than native Finns, consistent with the international average.

Low literacy is correlated with poor health, with individuals reporting low literacy being twice as likely to experience health problems. Furthermore, in Finland, individuals with advanced skill sets have a significantly higher likelihood of being employed when compared to those with lower skill sets, with a difference of almost double.

== See also ==
- Ageing of Europe
- Finnish Youth Survey Series
