= Finnish Iranians =

Iranians in Finland
Iranians in Finland / Finnish Iranians Iranilaiset Suomessa / Suomen iranilaiset

Total population
- 13,633 born in Iran; 24,047 Persian speakers (2025)

Regions with significant populations
- Helsinki, Tampere and Turku regions & Jyväskylä and Oulu

Languages
- Finnish, Persian, Armenian, Azerbaijani, Kurdish, Luri (See languages of Iran)

Religion
- 97% Islam; 2% Christianity (59% Orthodoxy); 1% others

Related ethnic groups
- Norwegian Iranians, Swedish Iranians, Overseas Iranians

Iranians in Finland or Finnish Iranians (Persian: ایرانیان فنلاند) are people who originate from Iran and who live in Finland. People can be born in Iran, have Iranian ancestry and/or be citizens of Iran. As of 2025, there were 13,633 people born in Iran living in Finland. Similarly, the number of people with Iranian citizenship was 7,205. The number of people who spoke Persian as their mother tongue was 24,047.

== Migration ==
A crime organization tried to sneak illegal Iranian immigrants through the Russian border. According to the Southeast Finland Border Guard District, if they succeeded, they would be smuggling 3-6 Iranians nearly every day. 1979 Iranian Revolution also led to several Iranians moving to Finland.

== Demographics ==
Historical population
Year	Pop.	±% p.a.
1990	291	—
1995	803	+22.51%
2000	1,205	+8.46%
2005	3,165	+21.30%
2010	5,020	+9.66%
2015	8,745	+11.74%
2020	15,105	+11.55%
2025	24,047	+9.75%
Persian speakers. Source: Statistics Finland

People born in Iran and living in Finland, according to Statistics Finland.

Country of birth Iran by municipality (2024)
Municipality	Population
Whole country	12,287
Helsinki	2,401
Espoo	2,395
Turku	1,343
Tampere	1,071
Vantaa	1,070
Jyväskylä	470
Oulu	463
Vaasa	352
Lappeenranta	292
Lahti	228
Kuopio	142
Hämeenlinna	135
Raisio	100
Kerava	76
Joensuu	69
Järvenpää	68
Lieto	68
Mariehamn	68
Jakobstad	68
Mikkeli	66
Salo	65
Kaarina	63
Forssa	54
Kauniainen	53
Kirkkonummi	46
Hyvinkää	42
Kajaani	41
Kouvola	40
Rovaniemi	38
Sipoo	38
Pori	36
Valkeakoski	36
Pirkkala	35
Kotka	32
Porvoo	30
Nurmijärvi	28
Seinäjoki	26
Kokkola	25
Ylöjärvi	24
Kangasala	23
Tuusula	23
Korsholm	21
Mäntsälä	20
Lohja	19
Savonlinna	18
Kemi	17
Tornio	16
Hollola	15
Jomala	15
Karkkila	15
Heinola	14
Naantali	14
Iisalmi	13
Kurikka	13
Riihimäki	13
Uusikaupunki	13
Loimaa	11
Vihti	11

People with Iranian citizenship living in Finland according to Statistics Finland.

Citizens of Iran by municipality (2024)
Municipality	Population
Whole country	6,251
Espoo	1,311
Helsinki	1,158
Turku	715
Tampere	578
Vantaa	380
Oulu	374
Lappeenranta	273
Vaasa	197
Jyväskylä	188
Lahti	127
Kuopio	126
Hämeenlinna	81
Forssa	55
Joensuu	51
Salo	36
Valkeakoski	35
Lieto	31
Raisio	28
Mariehamn	25
Kouvola	23
Kauniainen	22
Kirkkonummi	21
Rovaniemi	21
Kajaani	20
Pori	18
Seinäjoki	17
Hyvinkää	16
Kerava	16
Sipoo	16
Järvenpää	15
Kurikka	13
Kangasala	12
Mikkeli	12
Porvoo	12
Kotka	11
Lohja	11
Nurmijärvi	10

People with Persian as mother tongue living in Finland according to Statistics Finland.

Persian speakers by municipality (2024)
Municipality	Population
Whole country	22,154
Helsinki	4,615
Espoo	3,897
Vantaa	2,545
Tampere	2,467
Turku	1,356
Jyväskylä	794
Oulu	651
Vaasa	461
Hämeenlinna	377
Lahti	369
Lappeenranta	300
Kerava	240
Kuopio	228
Järvenpää	211
Mikkeli	170
Hyvinkää	162
Jakobstad	156
Pori	148
Rovaniemi	148
Kirkkonummi	114
Raisio	112
Joensuu	104
Kotka	98
Ylöjärvi	95
Kaarina	94
Tuusula	89
Pirkkala	86
Kauniainen	83
Nokia	82
Salo	72
Kouvola	70
Lohja	68
Iisalmi	67
Kajaani	66
Seinäjoki	65
Forssa	63
Nurmijärvi	63
Sipoo	61
Uusikaupunki	59
Kangasala	53
Mariehamn	52
Savonlinna	51
Valkeakoski	50
Kokkola	47
Mäntsälä	46
Porvoo	46
Kemi	42
Pieksämäki	36
Karkkila	32
Lieto	30
Tornio	30
Jämsä	28
Lempäälä	27
Raahe	27
Rauma	26
Riihimäki	26
Loimaa	25
Heinola	23
Äänekoski	20
Korsholm	19
Naantali	19
Kurikka	18
Hollola	16
Imatra	16
Pudasjärvi	16
Raseborg	14
Hirvensalmi	13
Huittinen	13
Kiuruvesi	13
Kristinestad	13
Siilinjärvi	13
Vihti	13
Kuusamo	12
Orimattila	12
Kalajoki	11
Lapinlahti	10
Siuntio	10

== Society ==
In January 2018, there was a protest held in Central Helsinki, in which 50 Iranians participated in. They wanted Iran to kick out the president Hassan Rouhani and the supreme leader Ali Khamenei.

28% of Iranians are employed, 18% are unemployed and 53% are outside the labour force. Of those inside the labour force, 61% are employed and 39% are unemployed. There are nearly 100 Iranian entrepreneurs. 342 Iranian men are in a registered relationship with a Finnish woman, and 126 Iranian women are in a registered relationship with a Finnish man.

== Notable people ==
- Honar Abdi, footballer
- Arman Alizad, tailor, fashion columnist and a TV-personality
- Rezgar Amani, footballer
- Makwan Amirkhani, mixed martial artist
- Ana Diamond, politician and human rights activist
- Aram Hasanzada, footballer
- Reza Heidari, footballer
- Ali Jahangiri, stand-up comedian and media-presenter
- Alexis Kouros, writer, documentary-maker, director, and producer
- Mina Mojtahedi, wheelchair curler
- Evelyn Mora, entrepreneur
- Tabe Slioor, socialite, reporter, and photojournalist
- Axl Smith, former presenter and entertainer
- Teuvo Tulio, film director

== See also ==
- Finland–Iran relations
- Immigration to Finland
- Iranian diaspora
- Swedish Iranians
