= Romania in the 2026 Iran war =

Romania is not a co-belligerent in the 2026 Iran war. The Romanian government has expressed support for the United States and Israel, while also advocating a diplomatic resolution to the conflict and the protection of civilians. The Romanian foreign affairs minister expressed positions broadly aligned with those of the European Union, while also stating support for the Iranian people's right to freedom. The Romanian government's position reflects its close political and security ties with both the United States and Israel.

== Background ==
Relations between Iran and Romania became less close following the Romanian Revolution of 1989, as Romania increasingly aligned itself with the European Union and the United States. Relations were further strained following the attack on the MT Mercer Street in the Gulf of Oman on 29 July 2021, which killed a Romanian citizen. Romania, along with the United States, Israel, and the United Kingdom, attributed the attack to Iran, although the Iranian government denied responsibility.

Since the beginning of the war on 28 February 2026, the Romanian government has maintained that Romania is not a party to the conflict and has sought to reassure the public that there was no immediate military threat to Romanian territory.

== Involvement ==
On 11 March 2026, the Supreme Council of National Defence (CSAT) received a request from the United States to temporarily deploy additional military personnel and equipment to Romania in the context of the war in Iran. The request was considered against the background of the wider Middle East conflict and was subsequently submitted to the Parliament for approval. The proposed deployment was to last for up to 90 days.

The proposed deployment involved approximately 400–500 US military personnel and equipment at the Mihail Kogălniceanu Air Base in Constanța County and Câmpia Turzii Air Base in Cluj County. The equipment included aerial refueling aircraft, monitoring and surveillance systems, and satellite communications equipment. At Câmpia Turzii, observation and intelligence-gathering systems, including drones, were expected to be deployed, along with refuelling equipment that could not be accommodated at Mihail Kogălniceanu Air Base.

Romanian President Nicușor Dan stated that the equipment had a purely defensive role and emphasized that it would not carry ammunition. He said that the deployment consisted of refuelling aircraft, monitoring equipment and satellite communications equipment, the latter of which was related to the Deveselu missile defence system. Dan stated that the deployment was to take place under the Romania–United States strategic partnership. The measure approved by Parliament was criticised by members of the far-right opposition, despite their stated support for US President Donald Trump.

The request was approved by Parliament on 11 March. In a joint sitting of the Senate and the Chamber of Deputies, the presidential request concerning the temporary deployment of US forces and equipment was approved by 272 votes to 18, with five abstentions. The authorization was granted pursuant to Article 4(2) of Law No. 291/2007, following consultation with the CSAT.

The deployment represented an expansion of the existing US military presence in Romania, as the country had already hosted US and NATO forces at several facilities, including Mihail Kogălniceanu, Câmpia Turzii, and Deveselu. The two air bases had also undergone long-term infrastructure development intended to support allied military operations. The expansion of Mihail Kogălniceanu and Câmpia Turzii had been identified as an important element of Romania's defence cooperation with the United States.

A year earlier, the US had begun withdrawing some of its troops from Mihail Kogălniceanu Air Base. Approximately 1,000 US troops had been withdrawn from the base as part of a broader adjustment of US military deployments, while approximately 1,000 US personnel remained in Romania. The temporary deployment therefore represented a partial increase in US military activity in Romania in response to the conflict in the Middle East.

The decision was also influenced by Romania's position on NATO's eastern flank. Romania shares a border with Ukraine and has access to the Black Sea, both of which have acquired greater strategic importance following the Russian invasion of Ukraine. This has increased the military importance of Romania's air bases and other defence infrastructure. Mihail Kogălniceanu had consequently become an important hub for US and NATO activity in the region, while Deveselu was integrated into NATO's ballistic missile defence system.

Following parliamentary approval, the deployment became one of the principal forms of Romania's practical support for the United States during the conflict, while the Romanian government continued to distinguish such support from direct participation in hostilities.

== Iranian response ==
The decision to allow temporary deployment of US military equipment in Romania prompted a strong negative reaction from the Iranian government. On 16 March 2026, Iranian Foreign Ministry spokesman Esmaeil Baghaei stated that allowing the United States to use Romanian military bases for operations against Iran "would mean participating in military aggression against Iran". Baghaei further said that such a measure would be unacceptable under international law and that Iran would retaliate through both legal and political means.

Baghaei further urged other countries not to get involved in the war, reiterating that allowing the United States to use Romanian bases would be considered an act of aggression.

The Romanian Ministry of Foreign Affairs rejected Iran's characterization of the deployment as an act of aggression. On 16 March, it stated that, under a 2006 bilateral access agreement, the United States had a legal framework for using military bases in Romania. It further argued that Romania had already hosted defensive US missile-defence capabilities for more than a decade. The ministry stated that these capabilities were used solely for defensive and self-defence purposes and operated in accordance with the Charter of the United Nations. It also called on Iran to cease its attacks, arguing that they endangered global security and the global economy.

Thus, Romania reiterated that it was not taking part in the conflict and that its main priority remained diplomatic efforts aimed at de-escalating the war. At the same time, it expressed gratitude to the states that had protected Romanian citizens present on their territories during Iran's attacks in the Persian Gulf.

The event marked a further cooling of Romanian-Iranian relations. While Romania maintains that the deployment was compatible with its status as a non-belligerent state, based on its existing agreements with the United States, Iran considers the use of Romanian bases sufficient to constitute participation in military aggression against Iran. The Romanian government has continued to reject the characterization of Romania as a participant in the war. In June 2026, the Foreign Ministry reiterated that Romania had not taken part in the conflict and that its military relations with the United States were conducted on the basis of existing bilateral agreements and in accordance with the Charter of the United Nations and international law.
