= Norwegian Iranians =

Norwegian-Iranians
Total population
- 20.000 (2021); 0.36% of the Norwegian population

Regions with significant populations
- Oslo, Lørenskog, Skedsmo, Drammen,

Languages
- Norwegian, Persian, Azerbaijani, Kurdish, Luri, Armenian (See languages of Iran)

Religion
- Shi'a Islam, Irreligion, Christianity, Baháʼí Faith, Judaism, Sunni Islam, Zoroastrianism, Other

Related ethnic groups
- Iranians, Iranian diaspora

Norwegian-Iranians (also known as Iranian Norwegians; Persian: ایرانیان نروژی, Norwegian: Norsk-iranere) are Norwegians of Iranian descent. The first wave of Norwegian-Iranians migrated to Norway as a direct consequence of the political instability that followed the Islamic revolution in 1979. The political climate has since forced many others to seek refuge in Norway.

Iranians living in Norway come from different ethnic backgrounds, reflecting the multi-ethnic nature of Iran. The majority of Norwegian-Iranians are ethnic Persians, with sizeable ethnic minorities being Iranian Azerbaijanis, Kurd-Iranians, Arab-Iranians, Northern Iranians (Gilak & Mazandarani) and Kermanshahi Kurds and Lurs.

== Background ==
The history of Norwegian-Iranians began in the aftermath of the 1979 Islamic revolution. During the 1950s and '60s, Iran had been experiencing a process of Westernization due to a Western-influenced monarchy led by the Pahlavi dynasty. This led to public discontent, and along with the increasingly authoritarian regime, massive protests erupted which, in the end, resulted in the overthrow of the shah and the establishment of the Islamic Republic.

Immediately after the revolution, the new regime completely shut down the higher educational system in order to overhaul and Islamicize it. During this process, many students and faculty were purged, initiating the first wave of the brain drain. Many of these fled to the USA and, partially, to Europe, including Norway. Generally, the years toward the end of the 8-yearlasting post Islamic revolution war between Iraq and Iran around 1985–1987 some Persians refugees started settling in Norway.

According to at least one source, Iran had no significant emigration or brain drain to wealthier countries before the Islamic Revolution. Emigration from Iran is said by one source to have started in earnest with conscription for the Iran–Iraq War. The Islamic government's need for fresh troops and the high mortality rate of those troops led to the flight of draft-age Iranian men to other countries, including Scandinavia.

== Politics ==
Many Norwegian-Iranians have experienced successful political careers, in many different political parties, across the political spectrum. Reza Rezaee was a member of the Oslo City Council for the far-left party Red. until his death in 2022. Mazyar Keshvari was a deputy member of parliament for the Progress Party and also sat on the Oslo City Council; he is an outspoken activist for human rights in Iran.

Masud Gharahkhani is a key politician for the Labour Party, and was candidate for becoming the first non-Western mayor of a Norwegian town in 2011 but lost in the election. Gharahkani became a member of the Norwegian parliament, Storting, in 2017 and served as its president (speaker) from november 2021. His father Bijan is a notable Labour Union activist. Another Labour party politician, Farahnaz Bahrami, who fled Iran in 1990, became a Norwegian citizen in 1997 and was elected deputy member of parliament for Hedmark county in the period 2009-2013.

== Media and entertainment ==
During the 2012 Eurovision Song Contest, Norway voted singer Touraj "Tooji" Keshktar all the way to the European finals. Model and actress Negar Khan became a notable celebrity after appearing in the Norwegian version of reality TV-series Paradise Hotel, while former Miss Norway pageant Aylar Lie (née Sharareh Dianati) has long been a famous artist, glamor-model and actress on Norwegian screens.

In the news media, journalist Mina Ghabel Lunde worked for several years as a reporter for the Norwegian Broadcasting Corporation before becoming PR-chief at Warner Music Norway. She is now a reporter at Dagens Næringsliv, the Norwegian Business Daily. Mina Hadjian was a successful but controversial radio personality and talk-show host during the late 2000s. In 2023, Javad Parsa won the Photo of the Year award, conferred by the Pressefotografenes Klubb.

== Science and technology ==
Physician and neuroscientist Mahmood Amiry-Moghaddam is a medical researcher and human rights activist, as well as co-founder of the Iran Human Rights foundation which monitors human rights violations in Iran, amongst his achievements are: His Majesty the King's Gold medal for the best medical PhD at the University of Oslo, Amnesty International Norway’s human rights prize 2007 and Anders Jahre’s medical prize for young investigators 2008.

== See also ==
- Iranian diaspora
- Immigration to Norway
- Iranians in Denmark
- Iranians in Finland
- Iranians in Sweden
