= Reza Rezaee =

Norwegian-Iranian politician (1960–2022)

- رضا رضایی
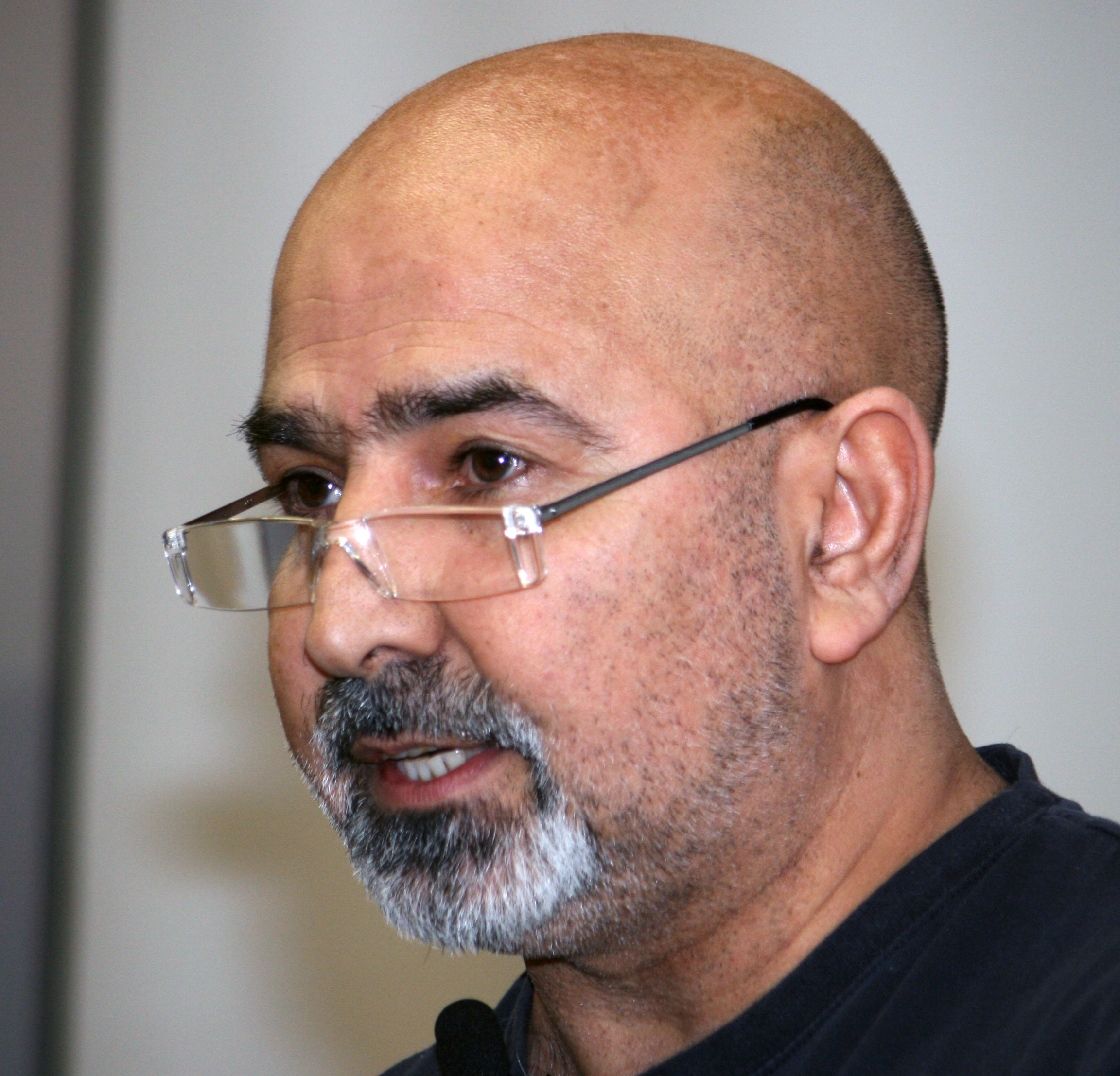
- Rezaee in 2010
- Born: 24 December 1960; Shiraz
- Died: 30 October 2022 (aged 61)
- Political party: Red

Mohammad Reza Rezaee (Persian: رضا رضایی; 24 December 1960 – 30 October 2022) was a Norwegian-Iranian politician representing the Marxist, left-wing political party Red.

== Political career ==
Born and raised in Shiraz in Iran, Rezaee was politically active since he entered politics as a 16-year-old in Iran. Due to this, he fled his homeland and arrived in Norway as a refugee in 1989, eventually settling in Oslo. He became active in the Socialist Left Party, sitting on the Central Committee. He lost his standing in the latter after publicly calling for leader Kristin Halvorsen to step down, following a controversial decision to send Norwegian combat troops to serve in the War in Afghanistan.

Rezaee left the party altogether in 2009 due to the party's support for the war while in government. He joined the revolutionary socialist party Red (Norwegian: Rødt) instead. In the 2011 local elections, he stood as the party's candidate for Mayor of Oslo. Although not elected mayor, he was elected into the Oslo City Council, along with Bjørnar Moxnes, the party's chairman.

Rezaee died on 30 October 2022, at the age of 61.

== Political views ==
=== Education ===
Rezaee supported the abolishment of school grades, as he believed it has a demoralizing effect on students. Additionally, he wanted to remove the concept of Homework, and rather focus on teaching at school. To address the acute shortage of Preschool teachers in Norway, Rezaee called for more of the unskilled employees in kindergartens to be offered continuing education to become teachers.

=== Foreign policy ===
A staunch opponent to the state of Israel, Rezaee frequently called for a national arms and trade boycott of the state. Apart from this, he was also active in the support for the Polisario Front in the Western Sahara conflict, repeatedly condemning the state of Morocco for alleged human rights violations against the Sahrawi population.
