= Finland–Iran relations =

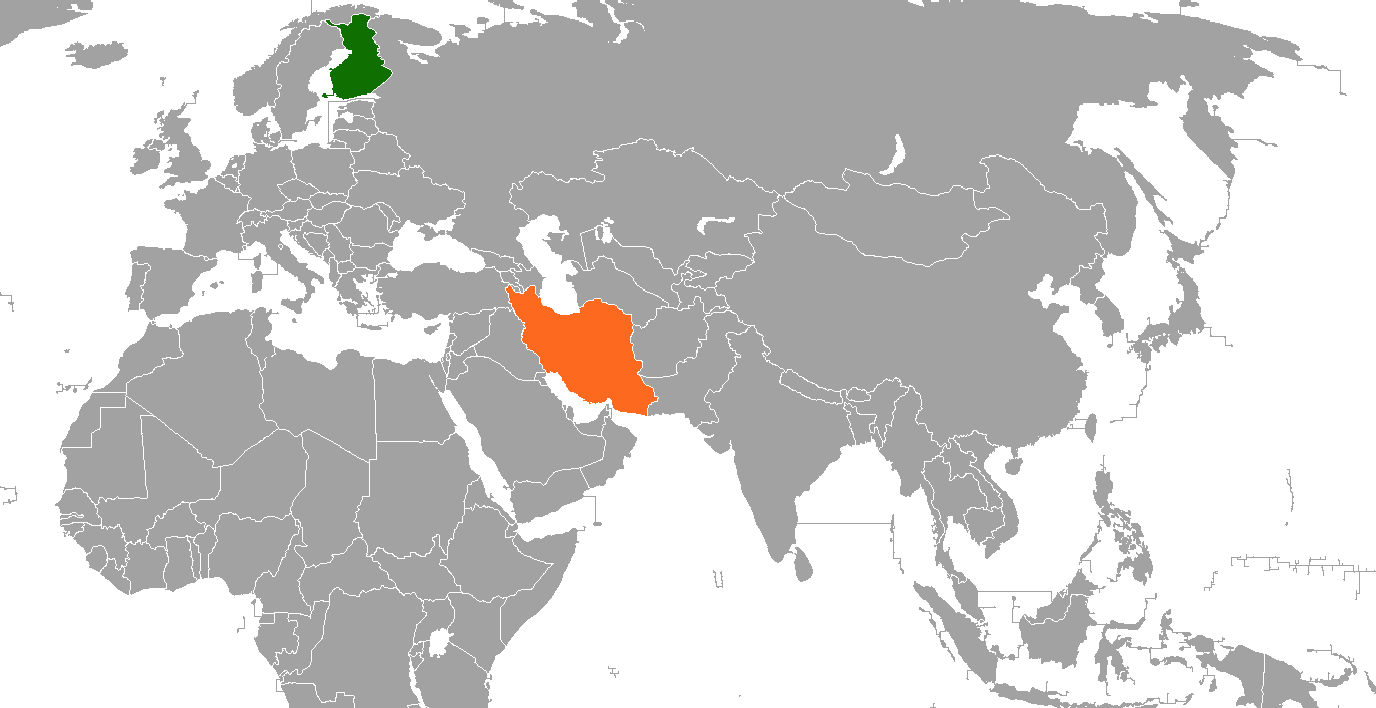

- Finland: Iran

Finland and Iran maintain diplomatic relations. Finland has an embassy in Tehran. Iran has an embassy in Helsinki.

== Nuclear Program ==
In March 2010, during the European Union (EU) Foreign Ministers' pastoral retreat, Finnish Foreign Minister Alexander Stubb said that there was consensus enough in the EU for imposing unilateral sanctions on Iran for its nuclear activity, as the United Nations (UN) resolution will likely not be ready until June 2010, with the risk that it will not even be passed at that time. He added that "failing [UN sanctions], I think there is an emerging consensus inside the European Union that we will take some unilateral measures from the EU side... What those exact measure are, have not been discussed in detail."

== Economic relations ==
In May 2008, Finnish ambassador to Iran Heikki Puurunen met with Iranian customs president Hashem Rahbari to discuss the possibility of the two countries signing an agreement memorandum that would boost their trade relations. Rahbari stated, "Iran has signed several customs trade agreements with foreign countries. If Finland is also interested in inking such an agreement, we will initiate it during the visit of the Finnish customs administration to Tehran."

== Diplomatic/Military Relationship ==
During that meeting in May 2008, Puurrunen stated, "Relations between the Islamic Republic of Iran and Europe have fallen in the past few years due to political reasons, but Finland welcomes stronger ties and higher trade volume with Iran." In April 2008 Iranian and Finnish chiefs of geology organization signed a memorandum of understanding for increased scientific and research cooperation."The two sides' geology organizations will cooperate in various fields including data analysis, exploration, petrology and training."

== Cultural relations ==
Around 10,000 Iranians live in Finland.

== Resident diplomatic missions ==
- Finland has an embassy in Tehran.
- Iran has an embassy in Helsinki.
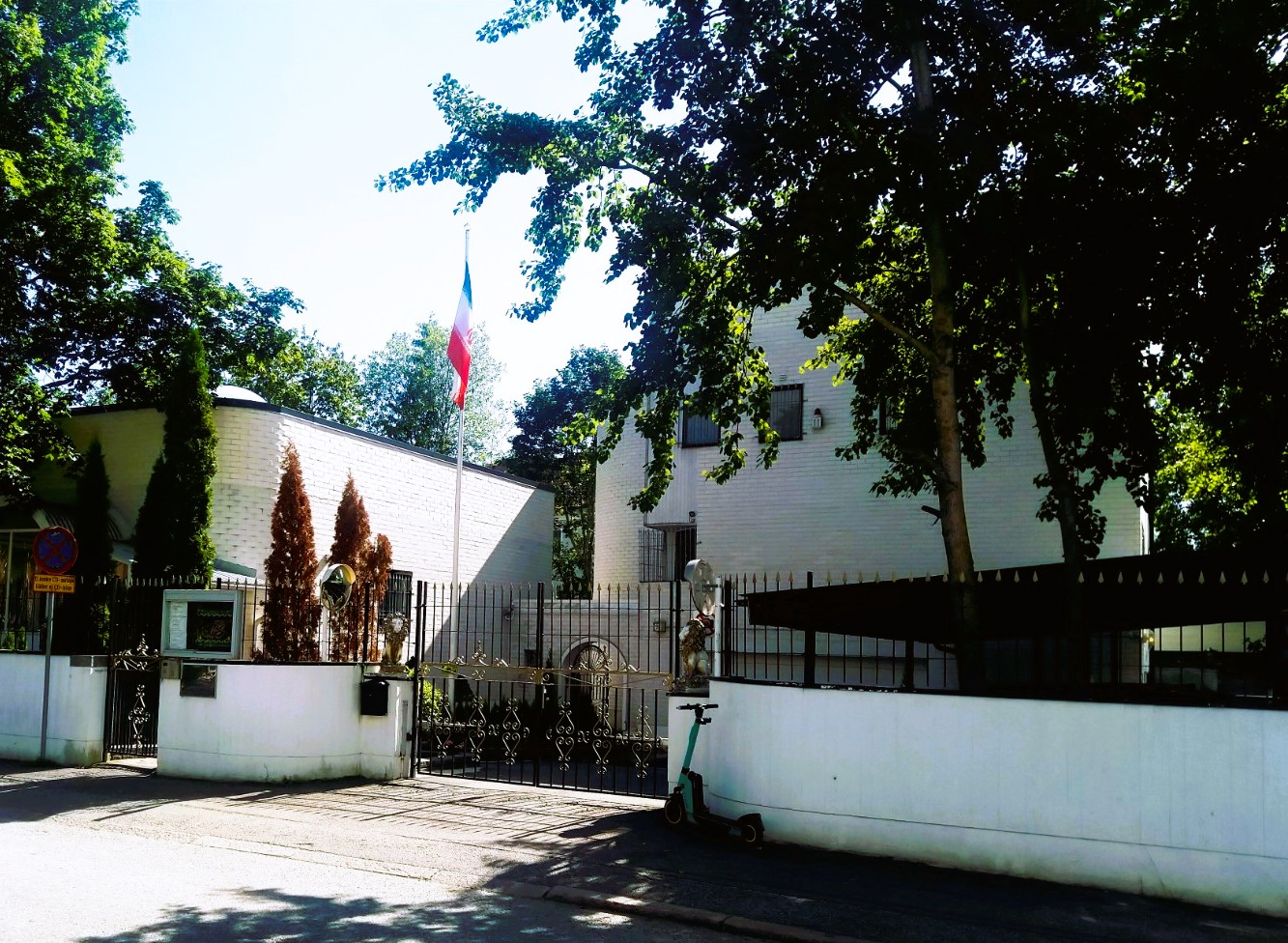
Embassy of Iran in Helsinki

== See also ==
- Foreign relations of Finland
- Foreign relations of Iran
- Iranians in Finland
