= Iranians in Romania =

Iranian immigrants in Romania

Iranian Romanians ایرانیان رومانی
Total population
- at least 2,000 (only Iranian-born, excluding descendants)

Regions with significant populations
- Bucharest

Languages
- Romanian, Persian, Azerbaijani, Armenian, Balochi, Kurdish, Mazanderani, and other languages of Iran.

Religion
- Shia Islam, Christianity, Sunni Islam, Judaism, Baháʼí Faith, Zoroastrianism, various others

Iranians in Romania are Romanian citizens of full or partial Iranian ancestry or background.

== History ==
Relations between the Iranians and Romanians go back centuries ago, when current territories of Romania were part of the Persian Empire. In modern times, Iranians started to immigrate to Romania since Communist times, mostly as students. After the fall of the Communism, Iranian businessmen came to Romania to start business. Due to the fact that Romania's workforce has decreased due to emigration, Iranian skilled workers also started to come to Romania. There is also a small but growing number of Iranian asylum seekers and refugees living in Romania. As of 2019 there are at least 2,000 Iranian-born people living in Romania.

== See also ==
- Iran–Romania relations
- Iranian diaspora
