= Iranian diaspora =

People of Iranian ancestry outside Iran

- Map of the Iranian people around the world, as of 2021

Total population
- 4,037,258 (official estimate, 2021)
- Americas: 1,905,813 (47.20%)
- Europe: 1,184,552 (29.34%)
- Other (Asia and Oceania): 1,115,572 (23.46%)

Languages
- Persian and Languages of Iran

Religion
- Shia Islam; Sunni Islam; Zoroastrianism; Christianity; Baháʼí; Judaism; Irreligion

The Iranian diaspora comprises people of Iranian origin living outside Iran, including Iranian emigrants and their descendants.

While Iranian migration has occurred historically, a significant wave of Iranians fled Iran after the 1979 Islamic Revolution due to political persecution under the new government. This trend has continued and intensified in the 2020s due to economic instability and political unrest.

In 2021, the Ministry of Foreign Affairs of Iran published statistics showing that 4,037,258 Iranians were living abroad. This figure includes people of Iranian ancestry in the United Arab Emirates, Kuwait, Israel, Turkey, and Bahrain whose families may have left Iran decades prior to the 1979 revolution, as well as those with partial ancestry. In December 2025, United Nations data indicated that there were 1.6 million Iranian asylum seekers worldwide, though most Iranians abroad are not asylum seekers.

Over one million people of Iranian descent live in the United States, with significant populations (between 100,000 and 500,000) in Australia, Canada, Germany, Israel, Sweden, Turkey, and the United Kingdom. In early 2026, the Iranian diaspora began holding rallies around the world in support of the 2025–2026 Iranian protests.

== Migration waves ==
The nation of Iran has experienced waves of emigration since 1979. The government has proposed the creation of a ministry of immigration following reports indicating critical emigration statistics, largely driven by political instability and economic sanctions.

== Statistics by country ==
Map of the Iranian diaspora as of 2021 Iran ≥ 1,000,000 ≥ 100,000 ≥ 10,000 ≥ 1,000

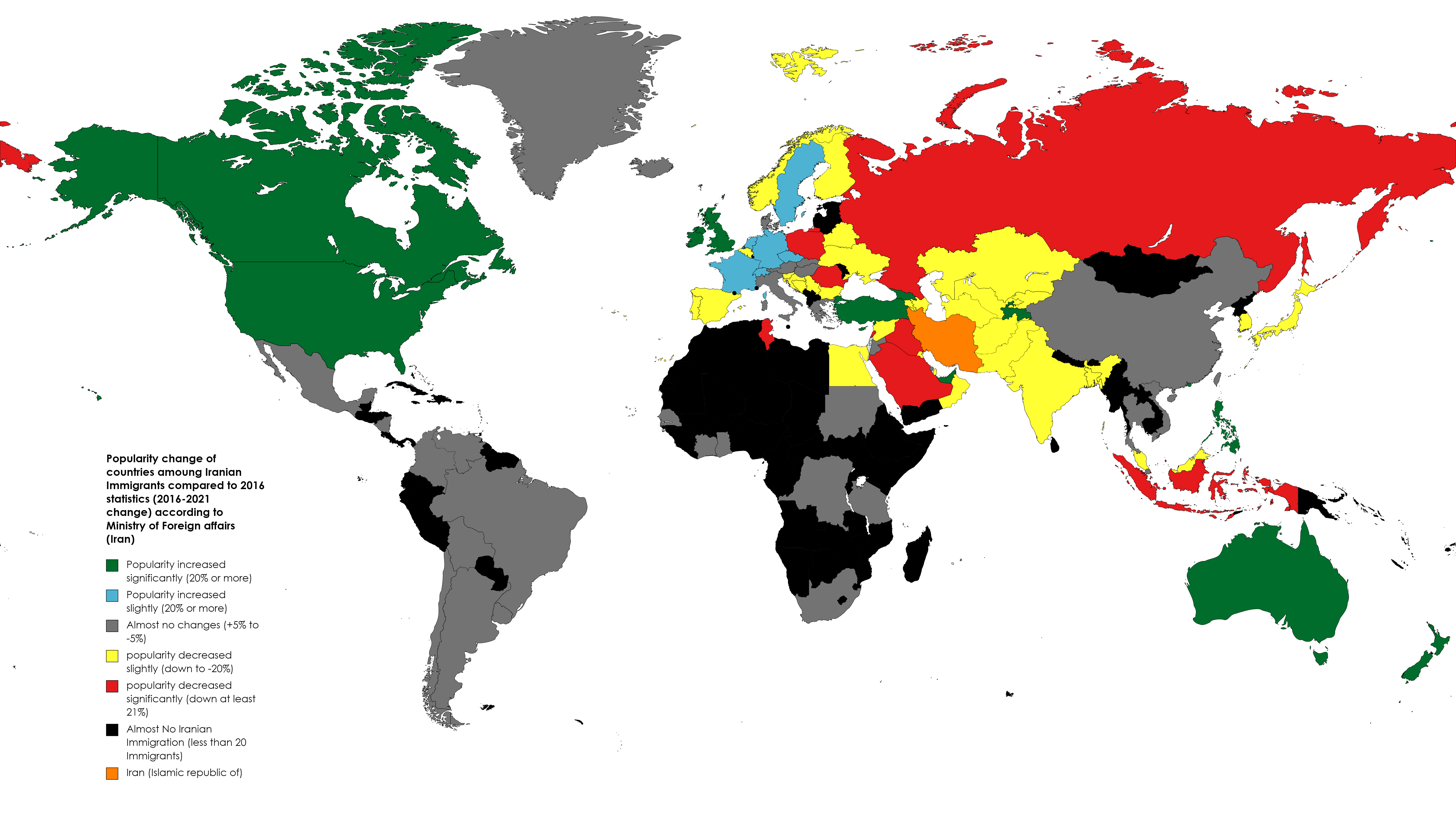
Popularity change of countries among Iranian Immigrants (2016–2021)

List of countries and territories by Iranian population
Country	Iranian diaspora (est.)	Article
United States	568,564 (2021)	Iranian Americans
Kuwait	400,000 (citizens) ▼38,000 (non-Kuwaiti, 2021)	Ajam of Kuwait
United Arab Emirates	▲357,000 (2021)	Iranians in the United Arab Emirates
Germany	▲336,000 (2023)	Iranians in Germany
Canada	▲280,805 (2021)	Iranian Canadians
Israel	250,000	Iranian Jews in Israel
Bahrain	▲225,000 (Estimated)	Ajam of Bahrain
Sweden	▲126,700 (2023)	Swedish Iranians
Turkey	▲126,640 (2021)	Immigration to Turkey
France	▲118,300 (2023)	Iranians in France
United Kingdom	▲114,432 (2021)	Iranians in the United Kingdom
Iraq	▼110,920 (2021)	Iranians in Iraq
Saudi Arabia	110,000 (2023)	
Australia	▲70,899 (2021)	Iranian Australians
Netherlands	▲52,000 (2021)	Iranians in the Netherlands
Austria	40,000 (2021)	
Denmark	32,700 (2021)	Iranians in Denmark
Italy	▲30,532(2024)	Only including Iran-born people
Malaysia	▼30,000 (2021)	Iranians in Malaysia
Norway	▼20,000 (2021)	Norwegian Iranians
Switzerland	▲20,000 (2021)	
Belgium	▼20,000 (2021)	
Qatar	▼20,000 (2021)	Iranians in Qatar
Georgia	▲16,000 (2021)	
India	▼12,760 (2021)	Demographics of India, Iranis (India), Parsis
New Zealand	▲12,000 (2021)	Iranian New Zealanders
Spain	▼12,000 (2021)	Iranians in Spain
Finland	▲10,129 (2021)	
Azerbaijan	▼10,000 (2021)	
Armenia	▼10,000 (2021)	
Syria	▼10,000 (2021)	Iranians in Syria
Oman	▼9,500 (2021)	
Tajikistan	▲8,000 (2019)	
China	▼7,780 (2021)	Iranians in China
Lebanon	▼5,000 (2021)	Iranians in Lebanon
Thailand	5,000 (2021)	Iranians in Thailand
Cyprus	▲5,000 (2021)	
South Africa	5,000 (2021)	
Japan	▼4,237 (2022)	Iranians in Japan
Ukraine	▼4,200 (2021)	
Hungary	▼4,111 (2021)	
Pakistan	▼3,950 (2021)	Iranian Pakistanis
Afghanistan	▼3,800 (2021)	
Romania	▼3,500 (2021)	Iranians in Romania
Kazakhstan	▼3,000 (2021)	
Portugal	▲2,934 (2024)	Only including foreign citizens, thus excluding, for instance, the 545 Iranians that have acquired Portuguese citizenship since 2008.
Brazil	▲2,800 (2025)	Only including Iranian-born people
Greece	2,500 (2021)	
Russia	▼2,434 (2021)	Iranians in Russia
Argentina	2,000 (2021)	
Poland	▼2,000 (2021)	
South Korea	▼1,770 (2021)	
Philippines	▲1,500 (2021)	Iranians in the Philippines
Czech Republic	▲1,487 (2025)	
Slovakia	▼1,140 (2021)	
Tanzania	1,000 (2021)	
Ireland	▲1,000 (2021)	
Mexico	500 (2021)	
Bulgaria	▼500 (2021)	
Egypt	▼500 (2021)	
Kyrgyzstan	▼500 (2021)	
Estonia	▲426 (2021)	
Hong Kong	▲410 (2021)	
Venezuela	400 (2021)	
Indonesia	▼400 (2021)	
Colombia	350 (2021)	Iranian Colombians
Chile	300 (2021)	
Belarus	▼227 (2021)	
Sudan	225 (2021)	
Singapore	200 (2021)	
Serbia	▼171 (2021)	
Bolivia	150 (2021)	
Slovenia	▼125 (2021)	
Bosnia and Herzegovina	▼110 (2021)	
Jordan	100 (2021)	
Kenya	70 (2021)	
Ghana	70 (2021)	
Uruguay	70 (2021)	
Ivory Coast	65 (2021)	
Croatia	▼60 (2021)	
Turkmenistan	▼54 (2021)	
Uganda	50 (2021)	
Tunisia	47 (2021)	
Senegal	47 (2021)	
Bangladesh	▼44 (2021)	
Mauritius	41 (2021)	
Vietnam	40 (2021)	
Nicaragua	40 (2021)	
Democratic Republic of the Congo	23 (2021)	
Brunei	21 (2021)	
Algeria	20 (2021)	
Gambia	17 (2021)	
Niger	15 (2021)	
Nigeria	15 (2021)	
Ethiopia	12 (2021)	
Madagascar	12 (2021)	
Albania	▼12 (2021)	
North Macedonia	▼11 (2021)	
Cameroon	10 (2021)	
Guinea	10 (2021)	
Namibia	10 (2021)	
Burkina Faso	6 (2021)	
Cuba	▼3 (2021)	
Mali	2 (2021)	
North Korea	1 (2021)	
West Asia and Other	▲2,433,000 (60.26%) (2021)	Anglosphere
North, Central and South America	▲1,905,813 (47.20%) (2021)	Americas
Europe	▲1,184,552 (29.34%) (2021)	Europe
Total:	▲ ~4,037,258 (2021)	List of sovereign states and dependent territories by immigrant population

== Socioeconomic status ==
Nearly 60 percent of Iranians abroad have earned at least an undergraduate degree. They have some of the highest rates of self-employment among immigrant groups. Many have founded their own companies, including Isaac Larian, the founder of MGA Entertainment, and Pierre Omidyar, who founded eBay in 1995 in San Jose, California. Iranian households in the United States earned on average $87,288 annually as of 2018, and are ranked ninth by income.

== Students abroad ==
According to the Iranian government, 55,686 Iranian students were studying abroad in 2013: 8,883 studied in Malaysia, 7,341 in the United States, 5,638 in Canada, 3,504 in Germany, 3,364 in Turkey, 3,228 in Britain, and the rest in other countries. The Iranian Ministry of Education estimated that between 350,000 and 500,000 Iranians were studying outside Iran as of 2014.

== Politics ==
In the Swedish parliament, Riksdag, after the 2022 elections, 3.4% of all incumbent seats were of people with Iranian heritage scattered in different parties. This amounts to 12 seats, the smallest party in the same Riksdag held 16 seats.

- Armenia: Hrant Markarian, Chairman of Armenian Revolutionary Federation
- Australia: Sam Dastyari, Former Senator
- United Kingdom: Seema Kennedy, Former Member of the House of Commons
- United Kingdom: Haleh Afshar, Member of the House of Lords
- United Kingdom: David Alliance, Member of the House of Lords
- Canada, Quebec: Amir Khadir, Former Member of the National Assembly of Quebec
- Canada, Ontario: Reza Moridi, Former Member of the Legislative Assembly of Ontario
- Canada, Ontario: Goldie Ghamari, Former Member of the Legislative Assembly of Ontario
- Canada: Majid Jowhari, Member of the Parliament of Canada
- Canada: Ali Ehsassi, Member of the Parliament of Canada
- France: Pouria Amirshahi, Former Member of the French National Assembly
- France: Mahmoud Khayami, founder of Iran Khodro
- France: Pierre Omidyar, investigative journalist for Honolulu Civil Beat and First Look Media, also founder of eBay
- France: Patrick Ali Pahlavi, member of the Pahlavi dynasty
- Germany: Yasmin Fahimi, Head of the German Trade Union Confederation
- Germany: Sahra Wagenknecht, Member of the Bundestag and founder of BSW
- Germany: Omid Nouripour, Member of the Bundestag, (Alliance '90/The Greens)
- Israel: Moshe Katsav, Former President of Israel
- Israel: Dan Halutz, Former Chief of General Staff
- Israel: Shaul Mofaz, Former Minister of Defense
- Kuwait: Ahmed Lari, Member of National Assembly of Kuwait
- Kuwait: Hassan Jawhar, Member of National Assembly of Kuwait
- Kuwait: Jenan Boushehri, Member of National Assembly of Kuwait
- New Zealand: Golriz Ghahraman, Former Member of New Zealand Parliament
- Netherlands: Farah Karimi, Member of the Senate, Former Member of the House of Representatives
- Norway: Masud Gharahkhani, President of the Storting
- Norway: Mazyar Keshvari, Former Member of the Storting
- Sweden: Romina Pourmokhtari, current Minister for the Environment
- Sweden: Parisa Liljestrand, current Minister for Culture
- Sweden: Nooshi Dadgostar, Leader of the Left Party
- Sweden: Ardalan Shekarabi, Member of the Riksdag, former Minister for Social Security and Minister for Civil Service Affairs
- Sweden: Hanif Bali, Municipal politician, political commentator and Former Member of the Riksdag
- Sweden: Ali Esbati, Member of the Riksdag
- Sweden: Maryam Yazdanfar, Former Member of the Riksdag
- Sweden: Reza Khelili Dylami, Former Member of the Riksdag
- Sweden: Alireza Akhondi, Member of the Riksdag
- Sweden: Rashid Farivar, Member of the Riksdag
- Sweden: Arin Karapet, Armenian-Iranian member of the Riksdag
- Sweden: Nima Gholam Ali Pour, Member of the Riksdag
- Sweden: Laila Naraghi, Member of the Riksdag
- Sweden: Azadeh Rojhan Gustafsson, Member of the Riksdag
- United States: Goli Ameri, Former Assistant Secretary of State for Educational and Cultural Affairs
- United States: Cyrus Amir-Mokri, Assistant Secretary of the Treasury for Financial Institutions
- United States: Yassamin Ansari, U.S. representative for Arizona's 3rd congressional district
- United States: Jimmy Delshad, Former Mayor of Beverly Hills, California
- United States, Washington: Cyrus Habib, Former Member of the Washington House of Representatives
- United States: Azita Raji, Former United States Ambassador to Sweden
- United States: Bob Yousefian, Former Mayor of Glendale

== Economics ==
In 2000, the Iran Press Service reported that Iranian expatriates had invested between $200 and $400 billion in the United States, Europe, and China, but almost nothing in Iran. In Dubai, Iranian expatriates have invested an estimated $200 billion (2006). Migrant Iranian workers abroad remitted less than two billion dollars home in 2006.

=== High net-worth individuals ===
Rank	Name	Citizenship	Net worth (USD)	Source(s) of wealth
1	Pierre Omidyar	Iran USA France	12.9 billion	eBay
2	Ghermezian family	Iran CAN	4.0 billion	Triple Five Group
3	Farhad Moshiri	Iran UK	2.8 billion	Metalloinvest, Everton
4	Nazarian family	Iran USA	2.0 billion	Qualcomm
5	Vincent & Robert Tchenguiz	Iran UK	1.4 billion	Real Estate
6	Manny Mashouf	Iran USA	1.3 billion	Bebe stores
7	Merage family	Iran USA	1.1 billion	Hot Pockets
8	Nasser David Khalili	Iran UK	1.0 billion	Real Estate
9	Hassan Khosrowshahi	Iran CAN	950 million	Future Shop
10	Omid Kordestani	Iran USA	900 million	Google
11	Anousheh Ansari	Iran USA	750 million	Sonus Networks
12	Isaac Larian	Iran USA	723 million	MGA Entertainment
13	Arash Ferdowsi	Iran USA	400 million	Dropbox

=== Expatriate fund ===
The fund's stated goal is to attract investment from Iranian expatriates and to use their experience in stimulating foreign investments.

== Religious affiliation ==
According to a 2008 survey by the Public Affairs Alliance of Iranian Americans (PAAIA), 42% of Iranian Americans identified as Muslim, 9% as Christian, 6% as Jewish, 5% as Zoroastrian, 7% as Baháʼí, and 31% as other or non-religious. A 2012 national telephone survey of a sample of 400 Iranian-Americans, commissioned by the PAAIA and conducted by Zogby Research Services, asked the respondents what their religions were. The responses broke down as follows: Muslim 31%, atheist/realist/humanist 11%, agnostic 8%, Baháʼí 7%, Jewish 5%, Protestant 5%, Roman Catholic 2%, Zoroastrian 2%, "Other" 15%, and "No response" 15%. The survey had a cooperation rate of 31.2%. The margin of error for the results was ± 5 percentage points, with higher margins of error for sub-groups. Notably, the number of Muslims decreased from 42% in 2008 to 31% in 2012.

== Notes ==
In the period between 1961 and 2005, the United States became the main destination of Iranian emigrants. An estimated 378,995 Iranians immigrated to the United States in that period, with California being the most common destination (158,613 Iran-born in 2000), New York (17,323), Texas (15,581), Virginia (10,889), and Maryland (9,733). The Los Angeles Metropolitan Area was estimated to be home to approximately 114,712 Iranian immigrants, earning the Westwood area of Los Angeles the nickname Tehrangeles.

The U.S. Census Bureau's decennial census form does not offer a designation for individuals of Iranian descent, and therefore it is estimated that only a fraction of the total number of Iranians are writing in their ancestry. The 2000 census estimated that the Iranian American community (including the US-born children of the Iranian foreign-born) numbers around 330,000. Studies using alternative statistical methods have estimated the actual number of Iranian Americans in the range of 691,000 to 1.2 million.

== See also ==
- Demographics of Iran
- Foreign relations of Iran
- Industrial Development and Renovation Organization of Iran
- Human capital flight from Iran
- Iranian nationality law
- Tourism in Iran
- Visa requirements for Iranian citizens
