= Iran–Romania relations =

- Iran: Romania

Iran and Romania maintain foreign, economic and cultural relations. Iran has an embassy in Bucharest. Romania has an embassy in Tehran.

== History ==
The rule of the ancient Iranian Achaemenid Empire reached the Danubian delta (modern-day Dobruja), when in 512BC King Darius I subjugated the ancient Getae people living in the area. More recently, the knight Keun of the Dutch legacy of Tehran was delegated to Persia on 16 December 1880 by the Government of Romania. In 1881 and 1887, Persia opened an honorary vice-consulate in Galați, respectively an honorary consulate in Brăila. In the year 1902, links were established at the level of links. These were interrupted between 14 October 1941 and 27 July 1946. On 25 October 1965, relations were established at the embassy level. In February 1968 a trade pact between two countries was signed in Tehran of which signatories were Gheorghe Cioară, Romanian minister of foreign trade, and Alinaghi Alikhani, Iranian minister of economy.

Romania was among the first countries to look after and recognize the administration after the Iranian Revolution, and Iran between the first countries to care and the recognition of a new leadership after the 1989 revolution.

On 29 July 2021, the oil tanker MT Mercer Street was attacked on the Gulf of Oman, killing one Romanian citizen, the captain of the ship, and one British citizen. On 2 August, the Minister of Foreign Affairs of Romania Bogdan Aurescu said that it was clear after investigations that Iran had committed the attack and condemned the country for it. He furthermore stated that "there is no justification whatsoever for deliberately attacking civilians" and that "we continue to coordinate with our partners for an appropriate response". As a result of the attack, the Iranian ambassador to Romania was urgently summoned at the Romanian ministry of foreign affairs at Bucharest. The incident was also condemned by officials from Israel, the United Kingdom and the United States.

== Resident diplomatic missions ==
- Iran has an embassy in Bucharest.
- Romania has an embassy in Tehran.

== See also ==
- Foreign relations of Iran
- Foreign relations of Romania
- Iranians in Romania
