= Finnish Youth Survey Series =

The Advisory Council for Youth Affairs (Nuora) started to produce Finnish Youth Surveys in 1994. The survey series charts attitudes and expectations of Finnish young people aged 15 – 29. Each survey contains both unique, current questions and recurring questions, which are repeated over time, enabling the study of long-term attitude changes. The main themes include attitudes to education, working life, social security, spending, drug use, and young people's willingness to participate in order to influence decision making. The data for the 2001, 2002, 2003, 2005, and 2006 are available in the Finnish Social Science Data Archive.

== Youth Survey 2006 ==
Number surveyed: 1901

Date Surveyed: March 2006

Type of Survey: Telephone Interview

Method of Data Collection : Cross-Sectional

Universe: Young People aged 15–29 in Finland

Abstract:

The youth survey focused on Finnish young people's trust in institutions, voting behaviour, views on acceptable behaviour and on causes for social exclusion, feelings of insecurity, religious affiliation, attendance and beliefs, and opinion on the Church.

First, the respondents were asked to what extent they agreed with a number of statements relating to work, working life, and commitment to work. Trust in political parties, public officials, trade unions, the Church, the Defence Forces, the police, Parliament, municipal executive council, the European Union, the President, banks, judiciary, the Government, NATO, the media and the Internet was charted. Some questions covered the respondents' voting behaviour in the presidential elections, and opinions on Finland's EU membership.

The respondents were asked to what extent they agreed with statements relating to acceptability of vandalism, demonstrations against foreigners, downloading music from the Internet without paying, tax evasion, etc. A number of statements related to sex, e.g. is it acceptable to buy or sell sex, have sex with a same-sex partner, have an abortion, etc. Views were probed on to what extent exclusion is caused by lack of education, friends, hobbies or faith in the future, own indifference, troublesome childhood home, injustice in society, etc. The respondents were asked whether they felt insecure or uncertain regarding studies, getting a job, health and safety of family members, increase in immigrant numbers, prevailing values and attitudes, etc.

The respondents' religious affiliation and attendance were surveyed. The respondents were also asked how religious they considered themselves to be, how religious their childhood home had been, and whether family members had talked about religion, attended religious services or Sunday School, or prayed before meals in their childhood home. Further questions charted how often the respondents pray and with whom they talk about religious issues. Two questions focused on beliefs about God. Attitudes towards different religions and religious groups were surveyed. The respondents were asked whether they believe in supernatural beings, ghosts, witches, UFOs, Jesus the Son of God, Holy Spirit, angels, Satan, demons, extraterrestrials, astrology, or that God created the world like it says in the Bible, that everything is predestined, etc. Feelings of life control and general satisfaction with life were charted. Views were also probed on what happens after death, and whether the Church is capable of providing good answers to moral, spiritual or social problems and needs. The respondents were asked how important they considered certain activities and services carried out by parishes to be. Voting behaviour in church elections was investigated.

Background variables included the respondent's gender, age, household composition, vocational education, and the education, age and occupation of R's parents, R's current educational or employment situation, type of employment contract, economic activity and occupational status, region and province of residence, type of municipality.

== Youth Survey 2005 ==
Number surveyed: 2000

Date Surveyed: March 2005

Type of Survey: Telephone Interview

Method of Data Collection: Cross-Sectional

Universe: Young People aged 15–29 in Finland

Abstract:

The main themes of this youth indicator survey were young Finns’ attitudes to occupational life, future expectations, sources of money, spending behaviour, financial support received from parents, attitudes to immigrants, and general values. At first, respondents were asked to what extent they agree or disagree with statements relating to commitment to a job or company, unemployment, salary, importance of education in occupational life etc. Intentions to work or study abroad, set up own business, or start a family were charted. Finnish primary and lower secondary education was evaluated.

Some questions focused on the respondent's economic situation and consumer habits: sources of money, financial support given by parents, amount of money spent on certain things (hobbies, make-up, travelling etc.). Young people's views on foreigners, different immigrant groups and cultural tolerance were surveyed. Willingness to marry or befriend an immigrant, and willingness to have a person from certain immigrant groups as the next door neighbour were studied. Respondents were asked whether they have friends who are immigrants or of immigrant origin.

Respondents’ values were charted by asking how important they considered the following to be: exciting life, self-respect, national security and traditions, religion, equality, social relations, work, own health, own appearance etc. Satisfaction with life was surveyed. Respondents were also asked how important it was to have, among other things, own family and children, close friends, permanent job, high standard of living, status, high salary, experience in politics, good physical condition by the time they were 35 years old.

Background variables included the respondent's year of birth, household composition, vocational education, main activity, institution of study if a student, type of employment contract, mother tongue, gender, province of residence, municipality type and parents’ level of education.
