= Honar Abdi =

Iranian-Finnish footballer (born 1994)

Personal information
- Date of birth: 21 June 1995 (age 31)
- Place of birth: Jyväskylä, Finland
- Height: 1.80 m (5 ft 11 in)
- Position: Right back

Youth career
- –2008: FC Blackbird
- 2009–2014: JJK

Senior career*
Years	Team	Apps	(Gls)
2014–2018	JJK	65	(0)
2019–2020	KPV	1	(0)
2020–2021	VPS	11	(0)
2022	JJK	6	(0)
- * Club domestic league appearances and goals as of 22 October 2022

Honar Abdi (Persian: هنر عبدی; born 21 June 1995) is an Iranian-Finnish footballer of Kurdish origin.

== Career ==
=== Kokkolan PV ===
On 2 January 2019, Abdi signed with Kokkolan PV.

=== Return to JJV ===
On 25 March 2022, Abdi returned to JJK for the 2022 season.

== Career statistics ==
As of 1 June 2019

Club	Division	Season	League		Cup		Other		Total	
Club	Division	Season	Apps	Goals	Apps	Goals	Apps	Goals	Apps	Goals
JJK	Ykkönen	2014	0	0	0	0	—		0	0
JJK	Ykkönen	2015	11	0	0	0	—		11	0
JJK	Ykkönen	2016	13	0	2	0	—		15	0
JJK	Veikkausliiga	2017	21	0	2	0	—		23	0
JJK	Ykkönen	2018	20	0	3	1	—		23	1
JJK	Total		65	0	7	1	—		72	1
Kokkolan PV	Veikkausliiga	2019	0	0	5	0	—		5	0
Career total			65	0	12	1	—		77	1
